= 2015–16 Wisła Kraków season =

Wisła Kraków
2015–16 season
- Chairman: Piotr Dunin-Suligostowski (From 21 December 2015); Robert Gaszyński (Until 21 December 2015)
- Manager: Dariusz Wdowczyk (From 13 March 2016); Marcin Broniszewski (Until 13 March 2016); Tadeusz Pawłowski (Until 29 February 2016); Marcin Broniszewski (Until 22 December 2015); Kazimierz Moskal (Until 30 November 2015)
- Ekstraklasa: 9th
- Polish Cup: Round of 32
- Top goalscorer: League: Paweł Brożek (14 goals); All: Paweł Brożek (14 goals)
- Highest home attendance: 23,079 (9 April vs Zagłębie Lubin, Ekstraklasa)
- Lowest home attendance: 6,497 (18 December vs Pogoń Szczecin, Ekstraklasa)
- Average home league attendance: 12,239
Home colours	Away colours	Third colours

The 2015–16 season was the 76th season of Wisła Kraków in the Ekstraklasa.

== Squad ==
Note: Flags indicate national team as defined under FIFA eligibility rules; some limited exceptions apply. Players may hold more than one non-FIFA nationality.

No.	Pos.	Nation	Player
1	GK	POL	Michał Miśkiewicz
2	DF	POL	Rafał Pietrzak
3	DF	POL	Michał Czekaj
4	DF	POL	Maciej Sadlok
5	DF	SVN	Boban Jović
6	DF	POL	Arkadiusz Głowacki ( captain)
7	MF	POL	Maciej Jankowski
7	MF	UKR	Vitaliy Balashov
8	MF	POL	Alan Uryga
9	MF	POL	Rafał Boguski
10	MF	SVN	Denis Popović
11	MF	HAI	Emmanuel Sarki
13	FW	POL	Krzysztof Drzazga
14	FW	CZE	Zdeněk Ondrášek
19	MF	POL	Tomasz Cywka
21	DF	POL	Łukasz Burliga
21	MF	CRO	Petar Brlek
22	GK	POL	Michał Buchalik

No.	Pos.	Nation	Player
23	FW	POL	Paweł Brożek
24	DF	POL	Szymon Witek
25	MF	POL	Konrad Handzlik
26	DF	HUN	Richárd Guzmics
27	MF	POL	Kamil Kuczak
27	MF	POL	Rafał Wolski
29	MF	POL	Krzysztof Mączyński
30	MF	POL	Jakub Mordec
33	GK	POL	Radosław Cierzniak
36	GK	POL	Mateusz Zając
38	DF	POL	Jakub Bartosz
40	MF	POL	Grzegorz Marszalik
42	DF	POL	Krystian Kujawa
43	DF	POL	Piotr Żemło
50	MF	BRA	Rafael Crivellaro
77	MF	HAI	Wilde-Donald Guerrier
88	MF	POL	Patryk Małecki

== Transfers ==
=== Summer transfer window ===
==== Arrivals ====
- The following players moved to Wisła.

	Name	Position	Transfer type	Previous club	Fee
	Free Transfer				
Substituted on	(Poland) Tomasz Cywka	Midfielder	3 June 2015	(England) Blackpool FC	-
Substituted on	(Poland) Radosław Cierzniak	Goalkeeper	7 June 2015	(Scotland) Dundee United	-
Substituted on	(Brazil) Rafael Crivellaro	Midfielder	26 June 2015	(United Arab Emirates) Ajman Club	-
Substituted on	(Poland) Krzysztof Mączyński	Midfielder	7 July 2015	(China) Guizhou Renhe F.C.	-
	Transfer				
Substituted on	(Slovenia) Denis Popović	Midfielder	23 June 2015	(Poland) Olimpia Grudziądz	€50,000

==== Departures ====
- The following players moved from Wisła.

	Name	Position	Transfer type	New club	Fee
	Loan Return				
Substituted off	(Poland) Mariusz Stępiński	Forward	21 June 2015	(Germany) 1. FC Nürnberg	-
	Out on loan				
Substituted off	(Poland) Mateusz Zając	Goalkeeper	21 August 2015	(Poland) Poroniec Poronin	-
	Free Transfer				
Substituted off	(Bosnia and Herzegovina) Semir Štilić	Midfielder	13 June 2015	(Cyprus) APOEL FC	-
Substituted off	(Poland) Dariusz Dudka	Defender	15 June 2015	(Poland) Lech Poznań	-
Substituted off	(Poland) Tomasz Zając	Forward	30 June 2015	(Poland) Korona Kielce	-
Substituted off	(Poland) Przemysław Lech	Midfielder	1 July 2015	(Poland) Wisła Płock	-
Substituted off	(Poland) Łukasz Garguła	Midfielder	10 July 2015	(Poland) Miedź Legnica	-
Substituted off	(Poland) Dawid Kamiński	Forward	11 July 2015	(Poland) Raków Częstochowa	-
Substituted off	(Poland) Gerard Bieszczad	Goalkeeper	16 July 2015	(Poland) Bytovia Bytów	-
Substituted off	(Brazil) Lucas Guedes	Midfielder	1 August 2015	(Poland) Lech II Poznań	-
Substituted off	(Uruguay) Jean Barrientos	Midfielder	7 August 2015	(Uruguay) Racing Club de Montevideo	-
Substituted off	(North Macedonia) Ostoja Stjepanović	Midfielder	21 August 2015	(Serbia) OFK Beograd	-

=== Winter transfer window ===
==== Arrivals ====
- The following players moved to Wisła.

	Name	Position	Transfer type	Previous club	Fee
	Free Transfer				
Substituted on	(Poland) Krzysztof Drzazga	Forward	9 December 2015	(Poland) KS Polkowice	-
Substituted on	(Czech Republic) Zdeněk Ondrášek	Forward	12 January 2016	(Norway) Tromsø IL	-
Substituted on	(Poland) Patryk Małecki	Midfielder	14 January 2016	(Poland) Pogoń Szczecin	-
Substituted on	(Ukraine) Vitaliy Balashov	Midfielder	26 January 2016	(Ukraine) FC Chornomorets Odesa	-
	Transfer				
Substituted on	(Poland) Rafał Pietrzak	Defender	20 January 2016	(Poland) GKS Katowice	€75,000
Substituted on	(Croatia) Petar Brlek	Midfielder	27 February 2016	(Croatia) NK Slaven Belupo	€400,000
	Return from loan spell				
Substituted on	(Poland) Mateusz Zając	Goalkeeper	10 February 2016	(Poland) Poroniec Poronin	-
	In on loan				
Substituted on	(Poland) Rafał Wolski	Midfielder	24 February 2016	(Belgium) KV Mechelen	-

==== Departures ====
- The following players moved from Wisła.

	Name	Position	Transfer type	New club	Fee
	Transfer				
Substituted off	(Poland) Maciej Jankowski	Midfielder	21 January 2016	(Poland) Piast Gliwice	€75,000
Substituted off	(Poland) Łukasz Burliga	Defender	18 February 2016	(Poland) Jagiellonia Białystok	€35,000
	Free transfer				
Substituted off	(Poland) Radosław Cierzniak	Goalkeeper	2 March 2016	(Poland) Legia Warsaw	-
	Out on loan				
Substituted off	(Poland) Kamil Kuczak	Midfielder	2 February 2016	(Poland) MKS Kluczbork	-

== Competitions ==
=== Friendlies ===
27 June 2015	FC VSS Košice (Slovakia)	1–0	(Poland) Wisła Kraków	Poprad, Slovakia
16:00 CEST (UTC+2)	Pavúk 63'	Report		Stadium: Národné tréningové centrum Referee: Pavol Chmura (Poprad)

4 July 2015	Wisła Kraków (Poland)	1–1	(Poland) Zagłębie Sosnowiec	Myślenice, Poland
10:00 CEST (UTC+2)	Jankowski 20'	Report	Tumicz 49'	Stadium: Sport Myślenice; Referee: Robert Marciniak (Kraków)

8 July 2015	Wisła Kraków (Poland)	2–0	(Czech Republic) MFK Karviná	Myślenice, Poland
11:00 CEST (UTC+2)	Boguski 6'; Jankowski 30'	Report		Stadium: Sport Myślenice; Referee: Paweł Kukla (Kraków)

11 July 2015	Wisła Kraków (Poland)	3–1	(Czech Republic) FC Baník Ostrava	Kalwaria Zebrzydowska, Poland
17:15 CEST (UTC+2)	Sadlok 29'; Pa. Brożek 30', 72'	Report	Narh 41'	Stadium: Ośrodek Sportu Kalwarianka; Referee: Dawid Pająk (Wadowice)

5 September 2015	Koszarawa Żywiec (Poland)	1–7	(Poland) Wisła Kraków	Żywiec, Poland
15:00 CEST (UTC+2)	Jurasz 71'	Report	Cywka 44', 51'; Crivellaro 48', 78'; Boguski 73'; Popović 75'; Jović 90'	Stadium: Stadion Koszarawy; Referee: Dawid Bukowczan (Żywiec)

10 October 2015	Wisła Kraków (Poland)	6–1	(Poland) Legendy Wisły Kraków	Kraków, Poland
15:30 CEST (UTC+2)	Cywka 8'; Pa. Brożek 34', 36'; Jović 86'; Kuczak 87'; Rajchel 88'	Report	Żurawski 75' (pen.)	Stadium: Stadion Miejski; Attendance: 15,068; Referee: Sebastian Krasny (Kraków)

22 January 2016	Wisła Kraków (Poland)	0–3	(Slovakia) MŠK Žilina	Myślenice, Poland
13:00 CET (UTC+1)		Report	Mbah 16'; Letić 67'; Káčer 74'	Stadium: Sport Myślenice; Referee: Grzegorz Jabłoński (Kraków)

26 January 2016	Ferencvárosi TC (Hungary)	2–2	(Poland) Wisła Kraków	Kadriye, Turkey
14:00 CET (UTC+1)	Varga 39'; D. Nagy 72'	Report	Balashov 27'; Drzazga 81'	Stadium: Papillon Sports Center

28 January 2016	PFC Botev Plovdiv (Bulgaria)	1–3	(Poland) Wisła Kraków	Kadriye, Turkey
15:00 CET (UTC+1)	Nedelev 21'	Report	Małecki 43'; Pa. Brożek 77', 87'	Stadium: IC Hotels Football Center

31 January 2016	HNK Hajduk Split (Croatia)	0–1	(Poland) Wisła Kraków	Belek, Turkey
14:00 CET (UTC+1)		Report	Bartosz 81'	Stadium: Sueno Hotels

5 February 2016	Wisła Kraków (Poland)	1–2	(Poland) Górnik Zabrze	Myślenice, Poland
16:40 CET (UTC+1)	Drzazga 50'	Report	Kwiek 21'; Madej 30'	Stadium: Sport Myślenice; Referee: Tomasz Musiał (Kraków)

=== Ekstraklasa ===
==== Results summary – regular season ====
Overall								Home						Away					
Pld	W	D	L	GF	GA	GD	Pts	W	D	L	GF	GA	GD	W	D	L	GF	GA	GD
30	8	13	9	45	35	+10	37	3	8	4	20	17	+3	5	5	5	25	18	+7

Last updated: 9 April 2016.
Source: 90minut

==== Results by round ====
Round	1	2	3	4	5	6	7	8	9	10	11	12	13	14	15	16	17	18	19	20	21	22	23	24	25	26	27	28	29	30
Ground	H	A	H	A	H	A	H	A	A	H	A	H	A	H	A	A	H	A	H	A	H	A	H	H	A	H	A	H	A	H
Result	D	D	W	D	D	D	W	L	W	D	L	D	W	D	W	D	L	L	L	L	L	L	D	L	D	D	W	W	W	D
Position	9	10	8	9	11	10	8	11	6	6	7	9	6	7	6	4	6	7	8	11	12	14	14	15	14	15	14	11	9	11

Updated to match(es) played on 9 April 2016. Source: 90minut
A = Away; H = Home; W = Win; D = Draw; L = Loss

==== Regular season ====
===== Matches =====
17 July 2015 1	Wisła Kraków	1–1	Górnik Zabrze	Kraków
18:00 CEST (UTC+2)	Crivellaro 24'	Report	Gergel 35'; Cupriak (yellow card) 85'	Stadium: Stadion Miejski; Attendance: 10,303; Referee: Marcin Borski (Warsaw)

24 July 2015 2	Cracovia	1–1	Wisła Kraków	Kraków
20:30 CEST (UTC+2)	Cetnarski 12'; Dąbrowski (yellow card) 58'; Wójcicki (yellow card) 90+3'	Report	Mączyński 3'; Boguski (yellow card) 42'; Burliga (yellow card) 67'; Jović (yellow card) 77'; Głowacki (yellow card) 87'	Stadium: Stadion Cracovii; Attendance: 12,933; Referee: Krzysztof Jakubik (Siedlce)

1 August 2015 3	Wisła Kraków	2–0	Lech Poznań	Kraków
20:30 CEST (UTC+2)	Boguski 7', 90+3', (yellow card) 68'	Report	Jevtić (yellow card) 66'; Trałka (yellow card) 70'	Stadium: Stadion Miejski; Attendance: 13,623; Referee: Szymon Marciniak (Płock)

9 August 2015 4	Legia Warsaw	1–1	Wisła Kraków	Warsaw
18:00 CEST (UTC+2)	Furman 44'; Rzeźniczak (yellow card) 58'; Kuciak (yellow card) 64'; Makowski (yellow card) 89'	Report	Guzmics (yellow card) 44'; Boguski (penalty missed) 59'; Guerrier 64'; Burliga (yellow card) 68'; Jankowski (yellow card) 80'	Stadium: Pepsi Arena; Attendance: 26,141; Referee: Daniel Stefański (Bydgoszcz)

16 August 2015 5	Wisła Kraków	3–3	Lechia Gdańsk	Kraków
18:00 CEST (UTC+2)	Guerrier 6', (yellow card) 36'; Jankowski 11', 58'; Burliga (yellow card) 64'; Cywka (yellow card) 73'; Głowacki (yellow card) 90+5'	Report	Wawrzyniak (yellow card) 8'; Łukasik 18', (yellow card) 31'; Mila (yellow card) 48'; Haraslín 51'; Kuświk (yellow card) 75'; Maloča 87'; Janicki (yellow card) 89'	Stadium: Stadion Miejski; Attendance: 11,115; Referee: Tomasz Kwiatkowski (Warsaw)

21 August 2015 6	Pogoń Szczecin	1–1	Wisła Kraków	Szczecin
18:00 CEST (UTC+2)	Frączczak (yellow card) 29'. (goal) 81' (pen.); Zwoliński (yellow card) 45'	Report	Crivellaro (yellow card) 11', (goal) 18' (pen.); Guzmics (yellow card) 37'; Guerrier (yellow card) 78'; Głowacki (yellow card) 79'	Stadium: Stadion im. Floriana Krygiera; Attendance: 8,897; Referee: Jarosław Przybył (Kluczbork)

28 August 2015 7	Wisła Kraków	4–2	Śląsk Wrocław	Kraków
20:30 CEST (UTC+2)	Guerrier (yellow card) 26', (goal) 58'; Pa. Brożek 29', 87'; Boguski 45'; Guzmics (yellow card) 89'	Report	Cierzniak 18' (o.g.); Zieliński (yellow card) 32'; Kiełb 67'; Pawelec (yellow card) 81'	Stadium: Stadion Miejski; Attendance: 11,503; Referee: Bartosz Frankowski (Toruń)

14 September 2015 8	Górnik Łęczna	1–0	Wisła Kraków	Łęczna
18:00 CEST (UTC+2)	Bonin 23'; Tymiński (yellow card) 53'; Świerczok (yellow card) 59'	Report	Mączyński (yellow card) 61'; Głowacki (yellow card) 66'; Crivellaro (penalty missed) 73'	Stadium: Stadion Górnika Łęczna; Attendance: 5,311; Referee: Tomasz Kwiatkowski (Warsaw)

19 September 2015 9	Podbeskidzie Bielsko-Biała	0–6	Wisła Kraków	Bielsko-Biała
18:00 CEST (UTC+2)	Janič (yellow card) 51'; Kato (yellow card) 73'	Report	Pa. Brożek 11', 33'; Popović 39'; Burliga 56'; Boguski 71'; Crivellaro 89'	Stadium: Stadion Miejski; Attendance: 6,517; Referee: Paweł Raczkowski (Warsaw)

25 September 2015 10	Wisła Kraków	0–0	Korona Kielce	Kraków
18:00 CEST (UTC+2)	Głowacki (yellow card) 4'; Mączyński (yellow card) 14'	Report	Gabovs (yellow card) 46' (yellow-red card) 80'	Stadium: Stadion Miejski; Attendance: 10,357; Referee: Daniel Stefański (Bydgoszcz)

3 October 2015 11	Piast Gliwice	1–0	Wisła Kraków	Gliwice
20:30 CEST (UTC+2)	Nešpor (yellow card) 43', (goal) 45'; Barišić (yellow card) 43'	Report	Pa. Brożek (yellow card) 43'; Sadlok (yellow card) 68'; Burliga (yellow card) 80'; Mączyński (yellow card) 84'; Jović (yellow card) 86'	Stadium: Stadion Piast; Attendance: 8,909; Referee: Jarosław Przybył (Kluczbork)

18 October 2015 12	Wisła Kraków	0–0	Termalica Bruk-Bet Nieciecza	Kraków
15:30 CEST (UTC+2)	Jankowski (yellow card) 86'; Mączyński (yellow card) 90+3'	Report	Pleva (yellow card) 31'; Kupczak (yellow card) 90+3'	Stadium: Stadion Miejski; Attendance: 10,494; Referee: Marcin Borski (Warsaw)

23 October 2015 13	Jagiellonia Białystok	1–4	Wisła Kraków	Białystok
20:30 CEST (UTC+2)	Tarasovs 23'; Mackiewicz (yellow card) 73'	Report	Jankowski (yellow card) 18', (goal) 62', 74'; Pa. Brożek 25' (pen.); Guzmics (yellow card) 36'; Guerrier 90+3'	Stadium: Stadion Miejski; Attendance: 10,120; Referee: Mariusz Złotek (Stalowa Wola)

30 October 2015 14	Wisła Kraków	0–0	Ruch Chorzów	Kraków
20:30 CEST (UTC+2)	Burliga (yellow card) 7'	Report	Szyndrowski (yellow card) 16'; Grodzicki (yellow card) 75'	Stadium: Stadion Miejski; Attendance: 13,850; Referee: Tomasz Kwiatkowski (Warsaw)

6 November 2015 15	Zagłębie Lubin	1–3	Wisła Kraków	Lubin
18:00 CET (UTC+1)	Dąbrowski (yellow card) 38'; Forenc (red card) 45'; Woźniak 83'	Report	Boguski 31'; Uryga (yellow card) 45+4'; Mączyński (yellow card) 53'; Guerrier (yellow card) 58', (goal) 88'; Todorovski 66' (o.g.)	Stadium: Stadion Zagłębia Lubin; Attendance: 4,716; Referee: Paweł Raczkowski (Warsaw)

20 November 2015 16	Górnik Zabrze	1–1	Wisła Kraków	Zabrze
20:30 CET (UTC+1)	Kopacz 51'; Danch (yellow card) 62'; Ćerimagić (yellow card) 79'; Kwiek (yellow card) 90+1'	Report	Pa. Brożek 2'; Guzmics (yellow card) 86'	Stadium: Stadion im. Ernesta Pohla; Attendance: 6,122; Referee: Paweł Gil (Lublin)

29 November 2015 17	Wisła Kraków	1–2	Cracovia	Kraków
18:00 CET (UTC+1)	Pa. Brożek 25'; Głowacki (yellow card) 45'; Sadlok (yellow card) 58'; Uryga (yellow card) 62'; Boguski (yellow card) 76'	Report	Rakels 7'; Deleu (yellow card) 18', (goal) 23'; Čovilo (yellow card) 29'; Jendrišek (yellow card) 72'; Sretenović (yellow card) 90+2'	Stadium: Stadion Miejski; Attendance: 20,094; Referee: Tomasz Kwiatkowski (Warsaw)

2 December 2015 18	Lech Poznań	2–0	Wisła Kraków	Poznań
20:30 CET (UTC+1)	Kownacki 20' (pen.); Kamiński (yellow card) 23'; Linetty (yellow card) 81'; Pawłowski 86'	Report	Sadlok (red card) 19'; Głowacki (yellow card) 66'	Stadium: INEA Stadion; Attendance: 13,279; Referee: Daniel Stefański (Bydgoszcz)

6 December 2015 19	Wisła Kraków	0–2	Legia Warsaw	Kraków
18:00 CET (UTC+1)	Guerrier (yellow card) 32'	Report	Brzyski (yellow card) 27'; Pazdan (yellow card) 73'; Nikolić 85'; Prijović 90+3'	Stadium: Stadion Miejski; Attendance: 20,100; Referee: Jarosław Przybył (Kluczbork)

12 December 2015 20	Lechia Gdańsk	2–0	Wisła Kraków	Gdańsk
18:00 CET (UTC+1)	Mi. Mak 36'; Stolarski (yellow card) 54'; Makuszewski 55', (yellow card) 90+3'	Report	Sadlok (yellow card) 27'; Boguski (yellow card) 90'; Cywka (yellow card) 90+2'	Stadium: PGE Arena Gdańsk; Attendance: 9,527; Referee: Piotr Lasyk (Bytom)

18 December 2015 21	Wisła Kraków	0–1	Pogoń Szczecin	Kraków
20:30 CET (UTC+1)	Guzmics (yellow card) 65'; Bartosz (yellow card) 79'; Burliga (yellow card) 89'	Report	Murawski 41'; Akahoshi (yellow card) 67'; Słowik (yellow card) 90'	Stadium: Stadion Miejski; Attendance: 6,497; Referee: Krzysztof Jakubik (Siedlce)

12 February 2016 22	Śląsk Wrocław	1–0	Wisła Kraków	Wrocław
20:30 CET (UTC+1)	Hateley (yellow card) 22'; Morioka (yellow card) 40'; Hołota 79'; Paraíba (yellow card) 85'; Gosztonyi (yellow card) 90'	Report	Guerrier (yellow card) 9'; Sadlok (yellow card) 11'; Guzmics (yellow card) 34'	Stadium: Stadion Miejski; Attendance: 13,916; Referee: Paweł Raczkowski (Warsaw)

22 February 2016 23	Wisła Kraków	1–1	Górnik Łęczna	Kraków
18:00 CET (UTC+1)	Guerrier 19'; Głowacki (yellow card) 34'; Guzmics (yellow card) 79'	Report	Danielewicz 76'; Bogusławski (yellow card) 85'	Stadium: Stadion Miejski; Attendance: 9,110; Referee: Jarosław Przybył (Kluczbork)

27 February 2016 24	Wisła Kraków	1–2	Podbeskidzie Bielsko-Biała	Kraków
20:30 CET (UTC+1)	Ondrášek 38'; Cywka (yellow card) 45+2'; Sadlok (yellow card) 65'	Report	Sokołowski (yellow card) 55'; Możdżeń 64' (pen.); Kowalski (yellow card) 72'; Štefánik 80'; Veratsila (yellow card) 90+3'	Stadium: Stadion Miejski; Attendance: 10,057; Referee: Tomasz Kwiatkowski (Warsaw)

4 March 2016 26	Wisła Kraków	1–1	Piast Gliwice	Kraków
20:30 CET (UTC+1)	Jović 81'; Pa. Brożek (penalty missed) 90+4'	Report	Barišić 42'; Ipša (yellow card) 90+4'	Stadium: Stadion Miejski; Attendance: 10,082; Referee: Szymon Marciniak (Płock)

8 March 2016 25	Korona Kielce	1–1	Wisła Kraków	Kielce
18:00 CET (UTC+1)	Diaw (yellow card) 56'; Cabrera 59'	Report	Popović 1' (pen.); Boguski (yellow card) 51'; Sadlok (yellow card) 85'	Stadium: Kolporter Arena; Attendance: 8,531; Referee: Tomasz Kwiatkowski (Warsaw)
Note: Original maturity 1 March 2016. Match canceled due to the poor condition of the turf.

14 March 2016 27	Termalica Bruk-Bet Nieciecza	2–4	Wisła Kraków	Nieciecza
18:00 CET (UTC+1)	Babiarz 40', (yellow card) 38'; Sołdecki 52' (pen.); Mišák (yellow card) 61'	Report	Małecki 6'; Głowacki (yellow card) 22'; Pa. Brożek 20'; Popović (yellow card) 46'; Wolski 47'; Boguski 53'	Stadium: Stadion Termaliki Bruk-Bet; Attendance: 4,595; Referee: Daniel Stefański (Bydgoszcz)

18 March 2016 28	Wisła Kraków	5–1	Jagiellonia Białystok	Kraków
20:30 CET (UTC+1)	Sadlok 24'; Pa. Brożek 34', 40'; Wolski 45'; Boguski 63'; Guzmics (yellow card) 69'	Report	Tarasovs (red card) 8'; Guti (yellow card) 12'; Świderski 70'	Stadium: Stadion Miejski; Attendance: 11,564; Referee: Paweł Raczkowski (Warsaw)

3 April 2016 29	Ruch Chorzów	2–3	Wisła Kraków	Chorzów
18:00 CEST (UTC+2)	Stępiński 25', (yellow card) 66'; Surma (yellow card) 65'; Koj (yellow card) 74', (goal) 81'; Lipski (penalty missed) 90+1'	Report	Głowacki 6', (yellow card) 22'; Ondrášek 50'; Wolski 57'	Stadium: Stadion Ruchu; Attendance: 9,300; Referee: Paweł Raczkowski (Warsaw)

9 April 2016 30	Wisła Kraków	1–1	Zagłębie Lubin	Kraków
18:00 CEST (UTC+2)	Boguski 11'; Wolski (yellow card) 42'; Popović (yellow card) 48'; Głowacki (yellow card) 51'	Report	Starzyński (yellow card) 36'; Polaček (yellow card) 51'; Todorovski (yellow card) 65'; Papadopulos 68'; Luís Carlos (yellow card) 71'	Stadium: Stadion Miejski; Attendance: 23,079; Referee: Daniel Stefański (Bydgoszcz)

===== League table =====
====== Regular season ======
Pos	Team	Pld	W	D	L	GF	GA	GD	Pts	Qualification
9	Podbeskidzie Bielsko-Biała	30	9	11	10	37	46	−9	38 (Note: Head-to-head record: Lechia 7 points, Ruch 5 points, Podbeskidzie 3 points.)	Qualification for the relegation round
10	Korona Kielce	30	9	10	11	32	37	−5	37	Qualification for the relegation round
11	Wisła Kraków (Note: Wisła Kraków were punished with a deduction of one point for failing with licensing requirements.)	30	8	13	9	45	35	+10	36	Qualification for the relegation round
12	Jagiellonia Białystok	30	10	5	15	37	54	−17	35	Qualification for the relegation round
13	Śląsk Wrocław	30	8	10	12	28	37	−9	34	Qualification for the relegation round

Source: Ekstraklasa, Soccerway
Rules for classification: 1) Points; 2) Head-to-head points; 3) Head-to-head goal difference; 4) Head-to-head goals scored; 5) Head-to-head away goals scored (only if two teams); 6) Goal difference; 7) Goals scored; 8) Fairplay ranking; 9) Draw. (Note: Head-to-head record is used only after all the matches between the teams in question have been played).

==== Results summary – relegation round ====
Overall								Home						Away					
Pld	W	D	L	GF	GA	GD	Pts	W	D	L	GF	GA	GD	W	D	L	GF	GA	GD
5	3	1	1	11	6	+5	10	2	1	0	6	3	+3	1	0	1	5	3	+2

Last updated: 6 May 2016.
Source: 90minut

==== Results by round ====
Round	1	2	3	4	5	6	7
Ground	H	A	H	A	H	H	A
Result	W	W	D	L	W	D	W
Position	9	9	9	9	9	9	9

Updated to match(es) played on 14 May 2016. Source: 90minut
A = Away; H = Home; W = Win; D = Draw; L = Loss

==== Relegation round ====
===== Matches =====
17 April 2016 31	Wisła Kraków	3–1	Górnik Zabrze	Kraków
18:00 CEST (UTC+2)	Małecki 6'; Wolski 42'; Ondrášek 80'	Report	Gergel 28'; Kopacz (yellow card) 40'; Ćerimagić (yellow card) 60'	Stadium: Stadion Miejski; Attendance: 10,471; Referee: Tomasz Kwiatkowski (Warsaw)

20 April 2016 32	Górnik Łęczna	0–3	Wisła Kraków	Łęczna
18:00 CEST (UTC+2)	Nikitović (yellow card) 72'; Sasin (yellow card) 85'	Report	Popović 68' (pen.), (yellow card) 89'; Bogusławski 75' (o.g.); Ondrášek 90+4' (pen.)	Stadium: Stadion Górnika Łęczna; Attendance: 3,632; Referee: Tomasz Wajda (Żywiec)

25 April 2016 33	Wisła Kraków	2–2	Termalica Bruk-Bet Nieciecza	Kraków
18:00 CEST (UTC+2)	Popović (yellow card) 32', (goal) 56' (pen.); Jović (yellow card) 36'; Sadlok (yellow card) 63'; Wolski (yellow card) 69'; Małecki (yellow card) 83'; Guerrier 90+2'	Report	Kędziora 71'; Plizga (yellow card) 85'; S. Nowak 90+3'	Stadium: Stadion Miejski; Attendance: 9,274; Referee: Paweł Gil (Lublin)

30 April 2016 34	Korona Kielce	3–2	Wisła Kraków	Kielce
20:30 CEST (UTC+2)	Airam Cabrera 12'; Verkhawtsow 17'; Fertovs (yellow card) 25'; Pylypchuk (yellow card) 43', (goal) 64'; Przybyła (yellow card) 90+2'	Report	Balashov (yellow card) 23'; Głowacki (yellow card) 36'; Pa. Brożek 61', 90'; Jović (yellow card) 71'	Stadium: Kolporter Arena; Attendance: 6,479; Referee: Piotr Lasyk (Bytom)

6 May 2016 35	Wisła Kraków	1–0	Jagiellonia Białystok	Kraków
20:30 CEST (UTC+2)	Pa. Brożek 25'; Bartosz (yellow card) 42'; Ondrášek (yellow card) 68'	Report	Burliga (yellow card) 27'; Grzyb (yellow card) 71'; Szymonowicz (yellow card) 78'	Stadium: Stadion Miejski; Attendance: 10,565; Referee: Jarosław Przybył (Kluczbork)

10 May 2016 36	Wisła Kraków	1–1	Śląsk Wrocław	Kraków
20:30 CEST (UTC+2)	Ondrášek 60'	Report	Gecov (yellow card) 20'; Grajciar 71'; Hołota (yellow card) 73'; Gosztonyi (yellow card) 90+3'	Stadium: Stadion Miejski; Attendance: 10,398; Referee: Łukasz Bednarek (Koszalin)

14 May 2016 37	Podbeskidzie Bielsko-Biała	3–4	Wisła Kraków	Bielsko-Biała
15:30 CEST (UTC+2)	Demjan 17'; Štefánik 28', 64'; Sloboda (yellow card) 73'	Report	Pa. Brożek 20'; Wolski (yellow card) 27'; Boguski 52'; Ondrášek 59'; Mączyński 65'	Stadium: Stadion Miejski; Attendance: 5,650; Referee: Marek Opaliński (Legnica)

====== Relegation round ======
Pos	Team	Pld	W	D	L	GF	GA	GD	Pts	Relegation
9	Wisła Kraków (Note: Wisła Kraków were punished with a deduction of one point during regular season for failing with licensing requirements.)	37	12	15	10	61	45	+16	32	
10	Śląsk Wrocław	37	12	12	13	41	46	−5	31	
11	Jagiellonia Białystok	37	13	6	18	46	62	−16	28	
12	Korona Kielce	37	10	15	12	39	45	−6	27	
13	Nieciecza	37	10	12	15	39	50	−11	26	
14	Górnik Łęczna	37	10	9	18	40	53	−13	24	
15	Górnik Zabrze (Note: Górnik Zabrze were punished with a deduction of one point during regular season for failing with licensing requirements.) (R)	37	6	18	13	38	51	−13	23	Relegation to the I liga
16	Podbeskidzie Bielsko-Biała (R)	37	9	12	16	45	63	−18	20	Relegation to the I liga

Source: Ekstraklasa, Soccerway
Rules for classification: 1) Points; 2) Points in regular season; 3) Head-to-head points in regular season; 4) Head-to-head goal difference in regular season; 5) Head-to-head goals scored in regular season; 5) Head-to-head away goals scored in regular season (if only two teams); 7) Goal difference; 8) Goals scored; 9) Fairplay ranking; 10) Play-off (only if needed to decide champion, teams for relegation or teams for UEFA competitions).
(R) Relegated

=== Polish Cup ===
13 August 2015 Round of 32	Ruch Chorzów	2–1	Wisła Kraków	Chorzów
20:00 CEST (UTC+2)	Lipski 21'; Grodzicki (yellow card) 42'; Višņakovs 88'	Report	Kujawa (yellow card) 44'; Mączyński (yellow card) 78'; Jankowski 90'	Stadium: Stadion Ruchu; Attendance: 6,504; Referee: Bartosz Frankowski (Toruń)

== Squad statistics ==
As of Match played 14 May 2016

=== Appearances and goals ===
No.	Pos	Nat	Player	Total		Ekstraklasa		Polish Cup	
No.	Pos	Nat	Player	Apps	Goals	Apps	Goals	Apps	Goals
1	GK	(Poland) POL	Michał Miśkiewicz	16	0	16+0	0	0+0	0
2	DF	(Poland) POL	Rafał Pietrzak	6	0	6+0	0	0+0	0
3	DF	(Poland) POL	Michał Czekaj	1	0	0+0	0	1+0	0
4	DF	(Poland) POL	Maciej Sadlok	27	1	27+0	1	0+0	0
5	DF	(Slovenia) SVN	Boban Jović	33	1	32+0	1	1+0	0
6	DF	(Poland) POL	Arkadiusz Głowacki	32	1	32+0	1	0+0	0
7	MF	(Poland) POL	Maciej Jankowski	19	5	13+5	4	1+0	1
7	MF	(Ukraine) UKR	Vitaliy Balashov	8	0	4+4	0	0+0	0
8	MF	(Poland) POL	Alan Uryga	25	0	21+3	0	1+0	0
9	MF	(Poland) POL	Rafał Boguski	37	9	31+5	9	1+0	0
10	MF	(Slovenia) SVN	Denis Popović	31	4	19+11	4	1+0	0
13	FW	(Poland) POL	Krzysztof Drzazga	7	0	2+5	0	0+0	0
14	FW	(Czech Republic) CZE	Zdeněk Ondrášek	16	6	16+0	6	0+0	0
19	MF	(Poland) POL	Tomasz Cywka	28	0	10+17	0	1+0	0
21	DF	(Poland) POL	Łukasz Burliga	21	1	19+1	1	1+0	0
21	MF	(Croatia) CRO	Petar Brlek	7	0	3+4	0	0+0	0
22	GK	(Poland) POL	Michał Buchalik	1	0	0+0	0	1+0	0
23	FW	(Poland) POL	Paweł Brożek	30	14	25+4	14	0+1	0
24	DF	(Poland) POL	Szymon Witek	1	0	0+1	0	0+0	0
25	MF	(Poland) POL	Konrad Handzlik	1	0	0+1	0	0+0	0
26	DF	(Hungary) HUN	Richárd Guzmics	33	0	32+1	0	0+0	0
27	MF	(Poland) POL	Kamil Kuczak	4	0	1+3	0	0+0	0
27	MF	(Poland) POL	Rafał Wolski	14	4	13+1	4	0+0	0
29	MF	(Poland) POL	Krzysztof Mączyński	25	2	22+2	2	0+1	0
30	MF	(Poland) POL	Jakub Mordec	1	0	0+1	0	0+0	0
33	GK	(Poland) POL	Radosław Cierzniak	21	0	21+0	0	0+0	0
38	DF	(Poland) POL	Jakub Bartosz	6	0	4+2	0	0+0	0
40	MF	(Poland) POL	Grzegorz Marszalik	5	0	0+4	0	0+1	0
42	DF	(Poland) POL	Krystian Kujawa	3	0	1+1	0	1+0	0
43	DF	(Poland) POL	Piotr Żemło	1	0	1+0	0	0+0	0
50	MF	(Brazil) BRA	Rafael Crivellaro	21	3	7+13	3	1+0	0
77	MF	(Haiti) HAI	Wilde-Donald Guerrier	22	7	16+6	7	0+0	0
88	MF	(Poland) POL	Patryk Małecki	14	2	12+2	2	0+0	0

=== Goalscorers ===
Place	Position	Nation	Number	Name	Ekstraklasa	Polish Cup	Total
1	FW	(Poland)	23	Paweł Brożek	14	0	14
2	MF	(Poland)	9	Rafał Boguski	9	0	9
3	MF	(Haiti)	77	Wilde-Donald Guerrier	7	0	7
4	FW	(Czech Republic)	14	Zdeněk Ondrášek	6	0	6
5	MF	(Poland)	7	Maciej Jankowski	4	1	5
6	MF	(Slovenia)	10	Denis Popović	4	0	4
6	MF	(Poland)	27	Rafał Wolski	4	0	4
8	MF	(Brazil)	50	Rafael Crivellaro	3	0	3
9	MF	(Poland)	29	Krzysztof Mączyński	2	0	2
9	MF	(Poland)	88	Patryk Małecki	2	0	2
11	DF	(Poland)	4	Maciej Sadlok	1	0	1
11	DF	(Slovenia)	5	Boban Jović	1	0	1
11	DF	(Poland)	6	Arkadiusz Głowacki	1	0	1
11	DF	(Poland)	21	Łukasz Burliga	1	0	1
				TOTALS	58	1	59

=== Assists ===
Place	Position	Nation	Number	Name	Ekstraklasa	Polish Cup	Total
1	MF	(Poland)	27	Rafał Wolski	7	0	7
2	DF	(Slovenia)	5	Boban Jović	6	1	7
3	MF	(Poland)	7	Maciej Jankowski	4	0	4
3	MF	(Poland)	9	Rafał Boguski	4	0	4
3	MF	(Poland)	88	Patryk Małecki	4	0	4
6	FW	(Czech Republic)	14	Zdeněk Ondrášek	3	0	3
6	DF	(Poland)	21	Łukasz Burliga	3	0	3
6	FW	(Poland)	23	Paweł Brożek	3	0	3
9	MF	(Poland)	29	Krzysztof Mączyński	2	0	2
10	DF	(Poland)	4	Maciej Sadlok	1	0	1
10	MF	(Slovenia)	10	Denis Popović	1	0	1
10	MF	(Poland)	19	Tomasz Cywka	1	0	1
10	DF	(Hungary)	26	Richárd Guzmics	1	0	1
10	MF	(Haiti)	77	Wilde Donald Guerrier	1	0	1
				TOTALS	41	1	42

=== Disciplinary record ===
Number	Nation	Position	Name	Ekstraklasa		Polish Cup		Total	
Number	Nation	Position	Name	Booked	Sent off (straight red)	Booked	Sent off (straight red)	Booked	Sent off (straight red)
6	(Poland)	DF	Arkadiusz Głowacki	12	0	0	0	12	0
26	(Hungary)	DF	Richárd Guzmics	8	0	0	0	8	0
4	(Poland)	DF	Maciej Sadlok	7	1	0	0	7	1
21	(Poland)	DF	Łukasz Burliga	6	0	0	0	6	0
77	(Haiti)	MF	Wilde Donald Guerrier	6	0	0	0	6	0
29	(Poland)	MF	Krzysztof Mączyński	5	0	1	0	6	0
9	(Poland)	MF	Rafał Boguski	5	0	0	0	5	0
5	(Slovenia)	DF	Boban Jović	4	0	0	0	4	0
10	(Poland)	MF	Denis Popović	4	0	0	0	4	0
19	(Poland)	MF	Tomasz Cywka	3	0	0	0	3	0
27	(Poland)	MF	Rafał Wolski	3	0	0	0	3	0
7	(Poland)	MF	Maciej Jankowski	2	0	0	0	2	0
8	(Poland)	MF	Alan Uryga	2	0	0	0	2	0
38	(Poland)	DF	Jakub Bartosz	2	0	0	0	2	0
7	(Ukraine)	MF	Vitaliy Balashov	1	0	0	0	1	0
14	(Czech Republic)	FW	Zdeněk Ondrášek	1	0	0	0	1	0
23	(Poland)	FW	Paweł Brożek	1	0	0	0	1	0
50	(Brazil)	MF	Rafael Crivellaro	1	0	0	0	1	0
88	(Poland)	MF	Patryk Małecki	1	0	0	0	1	0
42	(Poland)	MF	Krystian Kujawa	0	0	1	0	1	0
			TOTALS	73	1	2	0	75	1
