= 2014–15 Wisła Kraków season =

Wisła Kraków
2014–15 season
- Chairman: Jacek Bednarz (until 25 August 2014); Tadeusz Czerwiński (interim, from 25 August 2014 until 1 September 2014); Ludwik Miętta-Mikołajewicz (interim, from 1 September 2014 until 31 December 2014); Robert Gaszyński (from 1 January 2015)
- Manager: Franciszek Smuda (until 9 March 2015); Kazimierz Moskal (from 10 March 2015)
- Ekstraklasa: 6th
- Polish Cup: Round of 32
- Top goalscorer: League: Paweł Brożek (15); All: Paweł Brożek (15)
- Highest home attendance: 31,289 (21 September vs Legia Warsaw, Ekstraklasa)
- Lowest home attendance: 4,277 (28 July vs Piast Gliwice, Ekstraklasa)
- Average home league attendance: 12,224
Home colours	Away colours	Third colours

The 2014–15 season was the 75th season of Wisła Kraków in the Ekstraklasa.

== Squad ==
Note: Flags indicate national team as defined under FIFA eligibility rules; some limited exceptions apply. Players may hold more than one non-FIFA nationality.

No.	Pos.	Nation	Player
1	GK	POL	Michał Miśkiewicz
3	DF	POL	Michał Czekaj
4	DF	POL	Maciej Sadlok
5	DF	POL	Dariusz Dudka
6	DF	POL	Arkadiusz Głowacki (captain)
7	MF	POL	Maciej Jankowski
8	MF	URU	Jean Barrientos
9	MF	POL	Rafał Boguski
10	MF	POL	Łukasz Garguła
11	MF	HAI	Emmanuel Sarki
13	DF	SRB	Marko Jovanović
14	FW	POL	Mariusz Stępiński
17	MF	MKD	Ostoja Stjepanović
18	MF	BIH	Semir Štilić

No.	Pos.	Nation	Player
20	DF	SVN	Boban Jović
21	DF	POL	Łukasz Burliga
22	GK	POL	Michał Buchalik
23	FW	POL	Paweł Brożek
25	MF	BRA	Lucas Guedes
26	DF	HUN	Richárd Guzmics
29	FW	POL	Tomasz Zając
30	GK	POL	Gerard Bieszczad
32	MF	POL	Przemysław Lech
34	MF	POL	Alan Uryga
43	DF	POL	Piotr Żemło
49	DF	POL	Szymon Witek
77	MF	HAI	Wilde-Donald Guerrier

== Transfers ==
=== Summer transfer window ===
==== Arrivals ====
- The following players moved to Wisła.

	Name	Position	Transfer type	Previous club	Fee
	In on loan				
Substituted on	(Poland) Mariusz Stępiński	Forward	25 August 2014	(Germany) 1. FC Nürnberg II	-
	Return from loan spell				
Substituted on	(Poland) Patryk Fryc	Defender	1 July 2014	(Poland) Termalica Bruk-Bet Nieciecza	-
Substituted on	(Poland) Damian Buras	Midfielder	1 July 2014	(Poland) Siarka Tarnobrzeg	-
	Free Transfer				
Substituted on	(Poland) Maciej Sadlok	Defender	1 July 2014	(Poland) Ruch Chorzów	-
Substituted on	(Brazil) Lucas Guedes	Midfielder	1 July 2014	(Brazil) Cruzeiro EC Youth	-
Substituted on	(Poland) Maciej Jankowski	Forward	1 July 2014	(Poland) Ruch Chorzów	-
Substituted on	(Poland) Michał Buchalik	Goalkeeper	1 July 2014	(Poland) Ruch Chorzów	-
Substituted on	(Hungary) Richárd Guzmics	Defender	10 September 2014	(Hungary) Szombathelyi Haladás	-

==== Departures ====
- The following players moved from Wisła.

	Name	Position	Transfer type	New club	Fee
	Out on loan				
Substituted off	(Poland) Dominik Kościelniak	Midfielder	7 July 2014	(Poland) Chrobry Głogów	-
Substituted off	(Poland) Dawid Kamiński	Forward	16 July 2014	(Poland) Termalica Bruk-Bet Nieciecza	-
	Transfer				
Substituted off	(Poland) Michał Chrapek	Midfielder	1 July 2014	(Italy) Catania Calcio	€1,400,000
	Free Transfer				
Substituted off	(Poland) Michał Szewczyk	Forward	1 July 2014	(Poland) Ruch Chorzów	-
Substituted off	(Poland) Michał Nalepa	Defender	1 July 2014	(Hungary) Ferencvárosi TC	-
Substituted off	(Poland) Patryk Fryc	Defender	1 July 2014	(Poland) Termalica Bruk-Bet Nieciecza	-
Substituted off	(Bosnia and Herzegovina) Gordan Bunoza	Defender	1 July 2014	(Italy) Pescara Calcio	-
Substituted off	(Poland) Michał Miśkiewicz	Goalkeeper	1 July 2014	(Poland) Wisła Kraków	-
Substituted off	(Poland) Jan Kocoń	Goalkeeper	1 July 2014		-
Substituted off	(Poland) Piotr Brożek	Defender	11 July 2014	(Poland) Piast Gliwice	-
Substituted off	(Croatia) Danijel Klarić	Forward	16 July 2014	(Austria) Sturm II Graz	-
Substituted off	(Germany) Fabian Burdenski	Midfielder	22 July 2014	(Germany) FSV Frankfurt	-

=== Winter transfer window ===
==== Arrivals ====
- The following players moved to Wisła.

	Name	Position	Transfer type	Previous club	Fee
	Return from loan spell				
Substituted on	(Honduras) Osman Chávez	Defender	1 January 2015	(China) Qingdao Jonoon	-
Substituted on	(Poland) Przemysław Lech	Midfielder	2 March 2015	(Poland) Flota Świnoujście	-
	Free transfer				
Substituted on	(Poland) Michał Miśkiewicz	Goalkeeper	28 January 2015	(Poland) Wisła Kraków	-
Substituted on	(Uruguay) Jean Barrientos	Midfielder	17 February 2015	(Portugal) Vitória SC	-
Substituted on	(Slovenia) Boban Jović	Defender	23 February 2015	(Slovenia) NK Olimpija Ljubljana	€75,000

==== Departures ====
- The following players moved from Wisła.

	Name	Position	Transfer type	New club	Fee
	Out on loan				
Substituted off	(Poland) Tomasz Zając	Forward	7 January 2015	(Poland) Chrobry Głogów	-
Substituted off	(Poland) Przemysław Lech	Midfielder	19 January 2015	(Poland) Flota Świnoujście	-
	Free transfer				
Substituted off	(Honduras) Osman Chávez	Defender	24 January 2015	(Honduras) CD Platense	-
	End of career				
Substituted off	(Serbia) Marko Jovanović	Defender	24 January 2015	-	-

== Competitions ==
=== Friendlies ===
21 June 2014	Bocheński KS (Poland)	0–2	(Poland) Wisła Kraków	Bochnia, Poland
17:00 CEST (UTC+2)		Report	Boguski 19'; Pa. Brożek 35'	Stadium: Miejski Stadion Sportowy im. dr. Władysława Krupy; Referee: Tomasz Kubik

24 June 2014	Wisła Kraków (Poland)	5–0	(Slovakia) MFK Ružomberok	Myślenice, Poland
17:00 CEST (UTC+2)	Štilić 6'; Jankowski 37'; Burliga 41'; Boguski 48'; Pa. Brożek 57'	Report		Stadium: Sport Myślenice; Referee: Paweł Kukla

28 June 2014	Wisła Kraków (Poland)	1–1	(Czech Republic) MFK Karviná	Myślenice, Poland
11:00 CEST (UTC+2)	Jankowski 26'	Report	Cverna 87'	Stadium: Sport Myślenice; Referee: Grzegorz Jabłoński

2 July 2014	FK DAC 1904 Dunajská Streda (Slovakia)	0–1	(Poland) Wisła Kraków	Poprad, Slovakia
17:00 CEST (UTC+2)	Nworah (yellow card) 23'	Report	Pa. Brożek 43'; Sadlok (yellow card) 85'	Stadium: Národné tréningové centrum

5 July 2014	Wisła Kraków (Poland)	1–1	(Slovakia) MŠK Žilina	Kalwaria Zebrzydowska, Poland
17:00 CEST (UTC+2)	Pa. Brożek 20'	Report	Mihálik 34'	Stadium: Ośrodek Sportu Kalwarianka; Referee: Dawid Pająk

9 July 2014	Wisła Kraków (Poland)	6–0	(Poland) Zagłębie Sosnowiec	Myślenice, Poland
11:00 CEST (UTC+2)	Jankowski 20'; Sadlok 36'; T. Zając 49'; Wójcik 63', 87'; Czekaj (red card) 74'; Sierczyński 85' (o.g.)	Report	Zalewski (yellow card) 23'	Stadium: Sport Myślenice; Referee: Sebastian Krasny (Kraków)

12 July 2014	Soła Oświęcim (Poland)	0–3	(Poland) Wisła Kraków	Oświęcim, Poland
17:00 CEST (UTC+2)		Report	Štilić 53'; Boguski 55'; Dudka 75'	Stadium: Stadion im. Braci Kisielińskich

6 September 2014	Lechia Sędziszów Młp. (Poland)	0–6	(Poland) Wisła Kraków	Sędziszów Młp., Poland
16:00 CEST (UTC+2)		Report	Pa. Brożek 13', 30'; Garguła 73', 85'; Pukała 83' (o.g.); Sarki 87'	Stadium: Stadion Miejski; Attendance: 1,000; Referee: Witold Kwaśny (Dębica)

11 October 2014	Amator Golce (Poland)	1–4	(Poland) Wisła Kraków	Truskolasy, Poland
13:30 CEST (UTC+2)	Rokosa 73'	Report	Boguski 10', 43' (pen.); Garguła 29'; Jankowski 59'	Stadium: Stadion Olimpii; Attendance: 950; Referee: Piotr Skoczylas (Częstochowa)

12 October 2014	Podhale Nowy Targ (Poland)	2–2	(Poland) Wisła Kraków	Nowy Targ, Poland
14:25 CEST (UTC+2)	Hałgas 7'; Misiura 66'	Report	Sarki 60'; Garguła 85'	Stadium: Stadion Miejski Letni im. Józefa Piłsudskiego; Referee: Łukasz Królczyk (Nowy Targ)

21 January 2015	Wisła Kraków (Poland)	2–0	(Poland) Piast Gliwice	Myślenice, Poland
12:45 CET (UTC+1)	Garguła 67'; Burliga 82'	Report		Stadium: Sport Myślenice; Referee: Sebastian Krasny (Kraków)

24 January 2015	Wisła Kraków (Poland)	2–1	(Slovakia) MFK Ružomberok	Myślenice, Poland
12:00 CET (UTC+1)	Dudka 34'; Guerrier 84'	Report	Żemło 77' (o.g.)	Stadium: Sport Myślenice

28 January 2015	Wisła Kraków (Poland)	1–1	(Poland) Zagłębie Sosnowiec	Myślenice, Poland
12:00 CET (UTC+1)	Garguła 60'; Guerrier (red card) 69'	Report	Szatan 49'	Stadium: Sport Myślenice; Referee: Grzegorz Jabłoński (Kraków)

31 January 2015	FC Sheriff Tiraspol (Moldova)	1–1	(Poland) Wisła Kraków	Kadriye, Turkey
16:00 CET (UTC+1)	Ricardinho 20'	Report	Guerrier 33'	Stadium: Papillon Sports Center; Referee: Marcin Szczerbowicz (Poland)

1 February 2015	Guangzhou R&F (China)	3–0	(Poland) Wisła Kraków	Aksu, Turkey
16:00 CET (UTC+1)	Míchel 13', 72' (pen.); Samuel 80'	Report		Stadium: Mardan Sports Complex

5 February 2015	FC Kuban Krasnodar (Russia)	2–0	(Poland) Wisła Kraków	Belek, Turkey
16:00 CET (UTC+1)	Melgarejo 18'; Shelayev 85'	Report		Stadium: Bellis Deluxe Hotel; Referee: Olim Tolibjonov (Uzbekistan)

8 February 2015	Universitatea Craiova (Romania)	2–1	(Poland) Wisła Kraków	Belek, Turkey
16:30 CET (UTC+1)	Brandán 50'; Băluță 71'	Report	Guerrier 73'	Stadium: IC Hotel Santai

2 May 2015	Polonia Przemyśl (Poland)	0–5	(Poland) Wisła Kraków	Przemyśl, Poland
15:00 CEST (UTC+2)		Report	Witek 9'; Boguski 11'; Stępiński 15', 39'; Bangura 90'	Stadium: Stadion Polonii; Referee: Zygmunt Ziober (Przemyśl)

=== Ekstraklasa ===
==== Regular season ====
===== Results summary =====
Overall								Home						Away					
Pld	W	D	L	GF	GA	GD	Pts	W	D	L	GF	GA	GD	W	D	L	GF	GA	GD
30	11	10	9	47	39	+8	43	6	5	4	20	18	+2	5	5	5	27	21	+6

Last updated: 29 April 2015.
Source: 90minut

===== Results by round =====
Round	1	2	3	4	5	6	7	8	9	10	11	12	13	14	15	16	17	18	19	20	21	22	23	24	25	26	27	28	29	30
Ground	A	H	A	H	H	A	H	A	H	A	H	A	H	A	H	H	A	H	A	A	H	A	H	A	H	A	H	A	H	A
Result	D	D	W	D	W	W	W	W	L	L	L	W	W	L	D	W	D	L	W	L	D	L	L	D	W	D	D	D	W	L
Position	9	11	7	9	5	3	1	1	2	5	6	4	4	5	5	2	2	4	4	5	5	5	6	6	5	5	5	5	4	5

Updated to match(es) played on 29 April 2015. Source: 90minut
A = Away; H = Home; W = Win; D = Draw; L = Loss

===== Matches =====
18 July 2014 1	Górnik Łęczna	1–1	Wisła Kraków	Łęczna
20:30 CEST (UTC+2)	Nowak 28'; Bielák (yellow card) 56'	Report	Sadlok 41'; Štilić (yellow card) 59'; Głowacki (yellow card) 90+1'	Stadium: Stadion Górnika; Attendance: 5,025; Referee: Szymon Marciniak (Płock)

28 July 2014 2	Wisła Kraków	1–1	Piast Gliwice	Kraków
18:00 CEST (UTC+2)	Garguła (yellow card) 48'; Sadlok (yellow card) 61'; Jankowski 77'	Report	Polák 49'	Stadium: Stadion Miejski; Attendance: 4,277; Referee: Jarosław Przybył (Kluczbork)

3 August 2014 3	Lech Poznań	2–3	Wisła Kraków	Poznań
18:00 CEST (UTC+2)	Wołąkiewicz 59' (pen.); Wilusz (yellow card) 62'; Douglas 83'	Report	Garguła 17', 28'; Buchalik (yellow card) 59'; Burliga (yellow card) 84'; Guerrier 87'; Głowacki (yellow card) 90'	Stadium: INEA Stadion; Attendance: 16,264; Referee: Paweł Raczkowski (Warsaw)

10 August 2014 4	Wisła Kraków	2–2	Ruch Chorzów	Kraków
18:00 CEST (UTC+2)	Boguski 18' (pen.); Pa. Brożek (yellow card) 82', (goal) 84'	Report	Malinowski (yellow card) 17'; Dziwniel 43'; Efir 73'; Zieńczuk (yellow card) 85'	Stadium: Stadion Miejski; Attendance: 5,783; Referee: Daniel Stefański (Bydgoszcz)

17 August 2014 5	Wisła Kraków	3–1	Lechia Gdańsk	Kraków
18:00 CEST (UTC+2)	Głowacki (yellow card) 48'; Sadlok 51'; Štilić 56', 90'	Report	S. Vranješ 26' (pen.); Borysiuk (yellow card) 58'; T. Valente (yellow card) 90'	Stadium: Stadion Miejski; Attendance: 6,016; Referee: Paweł Gil (Lublin)

22 August 2014 6	Pogoń Szczecin	0–3	Wisła Kraków	Szczecin
20:30 CEST (UTC+2)	Golla (yellow card) 33'; Bąk (yellow card) 57'	Report	Štilić 25', (yellow card) 68'; Pa. Brożek 36', 75'; Jankowski (yellow card) 83'	Stadium: Stadion Miejski; Attendance: 8,548; Referee: Szymon Marciniak (Płock)

29 August 2014 7	Wisła Kraków	1–0	GKS Bełchatów	Kraków
20:30 CEST (UTC+2)	Boguski 24'; Uryga (yellow card) 64' (yellow-red card) 67'; Głowacki (yellow card) 85'	Report	Michał Mak (yellow card) 76'	Stadium: Stadion Miejski; Attendance: 16,832; Referee: Bartosz Frankowski (Toruń)

12 September 2014 8	Zawisza Bydgoszcz	2–4	Wisła Kraków	Bydgoszcz
18:00 CEST (UTC+2)	Kadú (yellow card) 41'; Luís Carlos 58'; Wágner 60'; Gevorgyan (yellow card) 81'; Drygas (yellow card) 89'	Report	Wójcicki 1' (o.g.); Burliga (yellow card) 40'; Czekaj (yellow card) 45'; Pa. Brożek 74'; Stępiński 79'; Štilić 89' (pen.)	Stadium: Stadion im. Zdzisława Krzyszkowiaka; Attendance: 2,653; Referee: Marcin Borski (Warsaw)

21 September 2014 9	Wisła Kraków	0–3	Legia Warsaw	Kraków
18:00 CEST (UTC+2)	Burliga (yellow card) 56'; Garguła (yellow card) 57'	Report	Broź (yellow card) 29'; Kucharczyk (yellow card) 46'; Sá 50'; Jodłowiec (yellow card) 64'; Saganowski (yellow card) 84'; Duda 90+4'; Radović 90+6'	Stadium: Stadion Miejski; Attendance: 31,289; Referee: Szymon Marciniak (Płock)

28 September 2014 10	Cracovia	1–0	Wisła Kraków	Kraków
18:00 CEST (UTC+2)	Čovilo 90+3'	Report	Sadlok (yellow card) 58'; Burliga (yellow card) 74'	Stadium: Stadion Cracovii; Attendance: 14,114; Referee: Paweł Raczkowski (Warsaw)

3 October 2014 11	Wisła Kraków	0–2	Jagiellonia Białystok	Kraków
20:30 CEST (UTC+2)	Guerrier (yellow card) 70'; Sadlok (yellow card) 84'	Report	Pazdan 53'; Piątkowski 90+3'; Modelski (yellow card) 90+4'	Stadium: Stadion Miejski; Attendance: 11,244; Referee: Krzysztof Jakubik (Siedlce)

19 October 2014 12	Górnik Zabrze	0–5	Wisła Kraków	Zabrze
18:00 CEST (UTC+2)		Report	Štilić 38', 78'; Guerrier (yellow card) 42'; Pa. Brożek 48', 61', 83'	Stadium: Stadion im. Ernesta Pohla; Attendance: 3,000; Referee: Tomasz Kwiatkowski (Warsaw)

24 October 2014 13	Wisła Kraków	3–2	Podbeskidzie Bielsko-Biała	Kraków
20:30 CEST (UTC+2)	Boguski (yellow card) 22'; Pietrasiak 62' (o.g.); Burliga 75'; Štilić 85' (pen.)	Report	Iwański 38', 55' (pen.), (yellow card) 80'; Deja (yellow card) 63', (red card) 86'; Chmiel (yellow card) 71'; Sloboda (yellow card) 74'; Tomasik (yellow card) 75' (yellow-red card) 84'	Stadium: Stadion Miejski; Attendance: 10,709; Referee: Marcin Borski (Warsaw)

31 October 2014 14	Korona Kielce	3–2	Wisła Kraków	Kielce
20:30 CET (UTC+1)	Kapo (yellow card) 26', (goal) 85'; Petrov 33'; Guzmics 61' (o.g.)	Report	Burliga 56', (red card) 73'; Sadlok (yellow card) 60'; Guerrier (yellow card) 62'; Dejmek 78' (o.g.); Garguła (yellow card) 89'	Stadium: Kolporter Arena; Attendance: 7,089; Referee: Paweł Raczkowski (Warsaw)

8 November 2014 15	Wisła Kraków	1–1	Śląsk Wrocław	Kraków
20:30 CET (UTC+1)	Pa. Brożek 68'; Dudka (yellow card) 84'	Report	F. Paixão 17' (pen.); Ostrowski (yellow card) 67'; Danielewicz (yellow card) 72'	Stadium: Stadion Miejski; Attendance: 14,242; Referee: Krzysztof Jakubik (Siedlce)

22 November 2014 16	Wisła Kraków	2–0	Górnik Łęczna	Kraków
15:30 CET (UTC+1)	Boguski 14'; Głowacki (yellow card) 49'; Sarki 90+4'	Report	Bielák (yellow card) 24' (yellow-red card) 89'; Nikitović (yellow card) 28'	Stadium: Stadion Miejski; Attendance: 10,032; Referee: Mariusz Złotek (Stalowa Wola)

28 November 2014 17	Piast Gliwice	0–0	Wisła Kraków	Gliwice
20:30 CET (UTC+1)	Klepczyński (yellow card) 25'; Hebert (yellow card) 57'; Szeliga (yellow card) 68'	Report	Boguski (yellow card) 27'; Štilić (yellow card) 53'; Uryga (yellow card) 71'; Guzmics (yellow card) 81'; Sadlok (yellow card) 84'	Stadium: Stadion Piast; Attendance: 5,450; Referee: Paweł Gil (Lublin)

7 December 2014 18	Wisła Kraków	1–2	Lech Poznań	Kraków
18:00 CET (UTC+1)	Burliga 9'; Dudka (yellow card) 34'; Guzmics (yellow card) 37'; Guerrier (red card) 61'; Sarki (yellow card) 68'	Report	Linetty (yellow card) 52'; Kędziora 54'; Trałka (yellow card) 64'; Sadayev 84', (yellow card) 90+2'	Stadium: Stadion Miejski; Attendance: 17,263; Referee: Bartosz Frankowski (Toruń)

13 December 2014 19	Ruch Chorzów	1–2	Wisła Kraków	Chorzów
15:30 CET (UTC+1)	Surma 21'; Malinowski (yellow card) 83'	Report	Pa. Brożek 16', 75'; Głowacki (yellow card) 22'; Burliga (yellow card) 72'	Stadium: Stadion Ruchu; Attendance: 6,827; Referee: Mariusz Złotek (Stalowa Wola)

13 February 2015 20	Lechia Gdańsk	1–0	Wisła Kraków	Gdańsk
20:30 CET (UTC+1)	Grzelczak (yellow card) 35', (goal) 54'; Nazário (yellow card) 90+2'	Report	Garguła (yellow card) 15'; Głowacki (yellow card) 64'	Stadium: PGE Arena Gdańsk; Attendance: 14,363; Referee: Szymon Marciniak (Płock)

20 February 2015 21	Wisła Kraków	1–1	Pogoń Szczecin	Kraków
20:30 CET (UTC+1)	Guzmics (yellow card) 19' (yellow-red card) 90+1'; Pa. Brożek 24'; Guerrier (yellow card) 62'; Sarki (yellow card) 90+3'	Report	Danielak (yellow card) 21'; Robak 43' (pen.)	Stadium: Stadion Miejski; Attendance: 9,083; Referee: Paweł Gil (Lublin)

28 February 2015 22	GKS Bełchatów	3–1	Wisła Kraków	Bełchatów
15:30 CET (UTC+1)	Piech 15', 75'; Głowacki 26' (o.g.); Baran (yellow card) 89'	Report	Głowacki 36'; Barrientos (yellow card) 71'; Sadlok (red card) 80'; Garguła (yellow card) 90'	Stadium: GIEKSA Arena; Attendance: 3,446; Referee: Bartosz Frankowski (Toruń)

7 March 2015 23	Wisła Kraków	0–1	Zawisza Bydgoszcz	Kraków
15:30 CET (UTC+1)	Burliga (yellow card) 39'; Głowacki (yellow card) 42'; Dudka (yellow card) 60'	Report	Álvarinho 12'; Drygas (yellow card) 25' (yellow-red card) 63'; Ziajka (yellow card) 39'	Stadium: Stadion Miejski; Attendance: 9,190; Referee: Paweł Raczkowski (Warsaw)

15 March 2015 24	Legia Warsaw	2–2	Wisła Kraków	Warsaw
18:00 CET (UTC+1)	Żyro 28'; Vrdoljak (yellow card) 71'; Jović 90' (o.g.)	Report	Guzmics (yellow card) 15'; Burliga 16'; Pa. Brożek 49' (pen.); Uryga (yellow card) 89'	Stadium: Pepsi Arena; Attendance: 26,527; Referee: Mariusz Złotek (Stalowa Wola)

21 March 2015 25	Wisła Kraków	2–1	Cracovia	Kraków
18:00 CET (UTC+1)	Štilić 16'; Guerrier (yellow card) 39'; Uryga (yellow card) 42'; Jović (yellow card) 51'; Garguła (yellow card) 52'; Pa. Brożek 53'; Dudka (yellow card) 70'; Burliga (yellow card) 78'	Report	Nykiel (yellow card) 39'; Budziński 54'; Polczak (yellow card) 61'; Kapustka (red card) 79'	Stadium: Stadion Miejski; Attendance: 23,307; Referee: Szymon Marciniak (Płock)

6 April 2015 26	Jagiellonia Białystok	2–2	Wisła Kraków	Białystok
18:00 CEST (UTC+2)	Tuszyński 16', 90+5'; Grzyb (yellow card) 38'; Mackiewicz (yellow card) 54'; Tymiński (yellow card) 66'; Popkhadze (yellow card) 88'	Report	Barrientos (yellow card) 28'; Štilić (yellow card) 43'; Pa. Brożek 46'; Guerrier 71', (yellow card) 78'	Stadium: Stadion Miejski; Attendance: 11,784; Referee: Krzysztof Jakubik (Siedlce)

10 April 2015 27	Wisła Kraków	1–1	Górnik Zabrze	Kraków
20:30 CEST (UTC+2)	Guerrier 5'; Boguski (yellow card) 84'	Report	Grendel 53'; Augustyn (yellow card) 74'	Stadium: Stadion Miejski; Attendance: 12,304; Referee: Tomasz Kwiatkowski (Warsaw)

17 April 2015 28	Podbeskidzie Bielsko-Biała	2–2	Wisła Kraków	Bielsko-Biała
20:30 CEST (UTC+2)	Iwański 18' (pen.); Górkiewicz 41'; Sokołowski (yellow card) 70'	Report	Uryga (yellow card) 17'; Guerrier 37', 71'	Stadium: Stadion Miejski; Attendance: 6,188; Referee: Daniel Stefański (Bydgoszcz)

26 April 2015 29	Wisła Kraków	2–0	Korona Kielce	Kraków
18:00 CEST (UTC+2)	Głowacki (yellow card) 11'; Guerrier 36'; Dudka (yellow card) 43'; Jankowski 53'	Report	Trytko (yellow card) 51'	Stadium: Stadion Miejski; Attendance: 10,079; Referee: Mariusz Złotek (Stalowa Wola)

29 April 2015 30	Śląsk Wrocław	1–0	Wisła Kraków	Wrocław
20:30 CEST (UTC+2)	Pich 68'; Danielewicz (yellow card) 82'	Report	Dudka (yellow card) 38'; Burliga (yellow card) 67'; Sadlok (yellow card) 81'	Stadium: Stadion Miejski; Attendance: 14,791; Referee: Paweł Raczkowski (Warsaw)

===== League table =====
Pos	Team	Pld	W	D	L	GF	GA	GD	Pts	Qualification or relegation
3	Jagiellonia Białystok	30	14	7	9	43	35	+8	49	Qualification to Championship round
4	Śląsk Wrocław	30	12	10	8	43	36	+7	46	Qualification to Championship round
5	Wisła Kraków	30	11	10	9	47	39	+8	43 (Note: Wisła Kraków ahead on head-to-head record; Górnik Zabrze – Wisła Kraków 0–5, Wisła Kraków – Górnik Zabrze 1–1)	Qualification to Championship round
6	Górnik Zabrze	30	11	10	9	43	43	0	43	Qualification to Championship round
7	Pogoń Szczecin	30	11	8	11	40	38	+2	41 (Note: Tied on head-to-head record, Pogoń Szczecin ahead on goal difference; Lechia Gdańsk – Pogoń Szczecin 0–1, Pogoń Szczecin – Lechia Gdańsk 0–1)	Qualification to Championship round

Source: Ekstraklasa
Rules for classification: 1) points; 2) head-to-head points; 3) head-to-head goal difference; 4) head-to-head goals scored; 5) goal difference; 6) number of goals scored; 7) Fair play table; head-to-head record is used only after all the matches between the teams in question have been played.

==== Championship round ====
===== Results summary =====
Overall								Home						Away					
Pld	W	D	L	GF	GA	GD	Pts	W	D	L	GF	GA	GD	W	D	L	GF	GA	GD
7	1	3	3	9	9	0	6	1	1	1	6	4	+2	0	2	2	3	5	−2

Last updated: 7 June 2015.

===== Results by round =====
Round	1	2	3	4	5	6	7
Ground	H	A	H	A	A	H	A
Result	W	D	D	L	L	L	D
Position	4	4	5	5	6	6	6

Updated to match(es) played on 7 June 2015. Source: 90minut.pl
A = Away; H = Home; W = Win; D = Draw; L = Loss

===== Matches =====
9 May 2015 31	Wisła Kraków	4–1	Górnik Zabrze	Kraków
20:30 CEST (UTC+2)	Boguski 5'; Garguła 46'; Burliga 50'; Pa. Brożek 66'	Report	Gergel 2'	Stadium: Stadion Miejski; Attendance: 8,724; Referee: Marcin Borski (Warsaw)

15 May 2015 32	Lechia Gdańsk	2–2	Wisła Kraków	Gdańsk
20:30 CEST (UTC+2)	Makuszewski 37'; Wojtkowiak (yellow card) 43'; Friesenbichler 73'	Report	Dudka (yellow card) 51'; Boguski 60'; Barrientos 69'; Jović (yellow card) 76'	Stadium: PGE Arena Gdańsk; Attendance: 18,032; Referee: Daniel Stefański (Bydgoszcz)

20 May 2015 33	Wisła Kraków	2–2	Pogoń Szczecin	Kraków
20:30 CEST (UTC+2)	Štilić 43', (yellow card) 73'; Dudka (yellow card) 83'; Stępiński 86'	Report	Golla (yellow card) 30'; Frączczak 58'; Matras (yellow card) 68'; Rogalski (yellow card) 79'; Murawski 90+4'	Stadium: Stadion Miejski; Attendance: 8,445; Referee: Daniel Stefański (Bydgoszcz)

23 May 2015 34	Jagiellonia Białystok	2–1	Wisła Kraków	Białystok
20:30 CEST (UTC+2)	Tuszyński 87'; Pazdan (yellow card) 89'; Pawłowski 90'	Report	Jankowski 42'	Stadium: Stadion Miejski; Attendance: 16,553; Referee: Tomasz Kwiatkowski (Warsaw)

31 May 2015 35	Legia Warsaw	1–0	Wisła Kraków	Warsaw
15:30 CEST (UTC+2)	Rzeźniczak (yellow card) 39', (goal) 60'; Brzyski (yellow card) 74'; Saganowski (yellow card) 82'	Report	Jović (yellow card) 53'; Sadlok (yellow card) 59'; Dudka (yellow card) 76'; Guerrier (yellow card) 82'	Stadium: Pepsi Arena; Attendance: 24,429; Referee: Szymon Marciniak (Płock)

3 June 2015 36	Wisła Kraków	0–1	Śląsk Wrocław	Kraków
20:30 CEST (UTC+2)	Barrientos (yellow card) 38'; Uryga (yellow card) 44'; Burliga (yellow card) 45+1'; Głowacki (yellow card) 88'	Report	Pich 78'	Stadium: Stadion Miejski; Attendance: 11,221; Referee: Paweł Raczkowski (Warsaw)

7 June 2015 37	Lech Poznań	0–0	Wisła Kraków	Poznań
18:00 CEST (UTC+2)	Arajuuri (yellow card) 30'	Report	Guzmics (yellow card) 25'; Burliga (yellow card) 38'	Stadium: INEA Stadion; Attendance: 41,556; Referee: Szymon Marciniak (Płock)

===== League table =====
Pos	Team	Pld	W	D	L	GF	GA	GD	Pts	Qualification
4	Śląsk Wrocław	37	15	13	9	50	43	+7	35	Qualification to Europa League first qualifying round (Note: Legia Warsaw qualifies for Europa League second qualifying round as winners of the 2014–15 Polish Cup and the spot for the runners-up (Europa League first qualifying round) is passed to the fourth placed team.)
5	Lechia Gdańsk	37	13	10	14	45	47	−2	29	
6	Wisła Kraków	37	12	13	12	56	48	+8	28	
7	Górnik Zabrze	37	12	11	14	50	60	−10	26	
8	Pogoń Szczecin	37	11	9	17	45	52	−7	22	

Source: Ekstraklasa
Rules for classification: 1) points; 2) points in regular season; 3) head-to-head points in regular season; 4) head-to-head goal difference in regular season; 5) head-to-head away goals scored in regular season (if only two teams); 6) head-to-head goals scored in regular season (if more than two teams); 7) goal difference; 8) number of goals scored; 9) Fair Play table.

=== Polish Cup ===
24 September 2014 Round of 32	Lech Poznań	2–0	Wisła Kraków	Poznań
20:45 CEST (UTC+2)	Jevtić (penalty missed) 38'; Pawłowski 66', 77'; Trałka (yellow card) 86'	Report		Stadium: INEA Stadion; Attendance: 10,695; Referee: Tomasz Kwiatkowski (Warsaw)

== Squad statistics ==
As of Match played 7 June 2015

=== Appearances and goals ===
No.	Pos	Nat	Player	Total		Ekstraklasa		Polish Cup	
No.	Pos	Nat	Player	Apps	Goals	Apps	Goals	Apps	Goals
1	GK	(Poland) POL	Michał Miśkiewicz	1	0	1+0	0	0+0	0
3	DF	(Poland) POL	Michał Czekaj	2	0	1+0	0	1+0	0
4	DF	(Poland) POL	Maciej Sadlok	31	2	29+2	2	0+0	0
5	DF	(Poland) POL	Dariusz Dudka	35	0	33+1	0	1+0	0
6	DF	(Poland) POL	Arkadiusz Głowacki	34	1	34+0	1	0+0	0
7	MF	(Poland) POL	Maciej Jankowski	26	3	22+4	3	0+0	0
8	MF	(Uruguay) URU	Jean Barrientos	16	1	7+9	1	0+0	0
9	FW	(Poland) POL	Rafał Boguski	36	5	30+6	5	0+0	0
10	MF	(Poland) POL	Łukasz Garguła	31	3	23+7	3	0+1	0
11	MF	(Haiti) HAI	Emmanuel Sarki	22	1	5+16	1	1+0	0
14	MF	(Poland) POL	Mariusz Stępiński	26	2	7+18	2	1+0	0
17	MF	(North Macedonia) MKD	Ostoja Stjepanović	3	0	1+2	0	0+0	0
18	MF	(Bosnia and Herzegovina) BIH	Semir Štilić	36	9	33+3	9	0+0	0
20	DF	(Slovenia) SVN	Boban Jović	16	0	16+0	0	0+0	0
21	DF	(Poland) POL	Łukasz Burliga	33	5	33+0	5	0+0	0
22	GK	(Poland) POL	Michał Buchalik	36	0	36+0	0	0+0	0
23	FW	(Poland) POL	Paweł Brożek	35	15	32+3	15	0+0	0
26	DF	(Hungary) HUN	Richárd Guzmics	22	0	20+1	0	1+0	0
27	MF	(Poland) POL	Kamil Kuczak	1	0	0+0	0	0+1	0
29	FW	(Poland) POL	Tomasz Zając	10	0	0+9	0	1+0	0
30	GK	(Poland) POL	Gerard Bieszczad	1	0	0+0	0	1+0	0
32	MF	(Poland) POL	Przemysław Lech	2	0	0+1	0	1+0	0
34	DF	(Poland) POL	Alan Uryga	32	0	29+2	0	1+0	0
38	DF	(Poland) POL	Bartłomiej Kolanko	1	0	0+0	0	0+1	0
43	DF	(Poland) POL	Piotr Żemło	4	0	1+2	0	1+0	0
77	DF	(Haiti) HAI	Wilde-Donald Guerrier	24	6	14+9	6	1+0	0

=== Goalscorers ===
Place	Position	Nation	Number	Name	Ekstraklasa	Polish Cup	Total
1	FW	(Poland)	23	Paweł Brożek	15	0	15
2	MF	(Bosnia and Herzegovina)	18	Semir Štilić	9	0	9
3	MF	(Haiti)	77	Wilde-Donald Guerrier	6	0	6
4	MF	(Poland)	9	Rafał Boguski	5	0	5
4	DF	(Poland)	21	Łukasz Burliga	5	0	5
6	MF	(Poland)	7	Maciej Jankowski	3	0	3
6	MF	(Poland)	10	Łukasz Garguła	3	0	3
8	DF	(Poland)	4	Maciej Sadlok	2	0	2
8	FW	(Poland)	14	Mariusz Stępiński	2	0	2
10	DF	(Poland)	6	Arkadiusz Głowacki	1	0	1
10	MF	(Uruguay)	8	Jean Barrientos	1	0	1
10	MF	(Haiti)	11	Emmanuel Sarki	1	0	1
				TOTALS	53	0	53

=== Assists ===
Place	Position	Nation	Number	Name	Ekstraklasa	Polish Cup	Total
1	MF	(Bosnia and Herzegovina)	18	Semir Štilić	12	0	12
2	MF	(Poland)	7	Maciej Jankowski	4	0	4
2	MF	(Poland)	9	Rafał Boguski	4	0	4
2	MF	(Poland)	10	Łukasz Garguła	4	0	4
2	DF	(Poland)	21	Łukasz Burliga	4	0	4
6	MF	(Haiti)	11	Emmanuel Sarki	3	0	3
6	DF	(Poland)	4	Maciej Sadlok	3	0	3
6	DF	(Slovenia)	20	Boban Jović	3	0	3
6	FW	(Poland)	23	Paweł Brożek	3	0	3
10	FW	(Poland)	14	Mariusz Stępiński	2	0	2
11	DF	(Poland)	5	Dariusz Dudka	1	0	1
11	MF	(Uruguay)	8	Jean Barrientos	1	0	1
11	MF	(Haiti)	77	Wilde-Donald Guerrier	1	0	1
				TOTALS	45	0	45

=== Disciplinary record ===
Number	Nation	Position	Name	Ekstraklasa		Polish Cup		Total	
Number	Nation	Position	Name	Booked	Sent off (straight red)	Booked	Sent off (straight red)	Booked	Sent off (straight red)
21	(Poland)	DF	Łukasz Burliga	11	1	0	0	11	1
6	(Poland)	DF	Arkadiusz Głowacki	10	0	0	0	10	0
5	(Poland)	DF	Dariusz Dudka	9	0	0	0	9	0
34	(Poland)	MF	Alan Uryga	8	1	0	0	8	1
4	(Poland)	DF	Maciej Sadlok	7	1	0	0	7	1
77	(Haiti)	MF	Wilde-Donald Guerrier	7	1	0	0	7	1
26	(Hungary)	DF	Richárd Guzmics	6	1	0	0	6	1
10	(Poland)	MF	Łukasz Garguła	6	0	0	0	6	0
18	(Bosnia and Herzegovina)	MF	Semir Štilić	5	0	0	0	5	0
8	(Uruguay)	DF	Jean Barrientos	3	0	0	0	3	0
9	(Poland)	MF	Rafał Boguski	3	0	0	0	3	0
20	(Slovenia)	DF	Boban Jović	3	0	0	0	3	0
11	(Haiti)	MF	Emmanuel Sarki	2	0	0	0	2	0
3	(Poland)	DF	Michał Czekaj	1	0	0	0	1	0
7	(Poland)	MF	Maciej Jankowski	1	0	0	0	1	0
22	(Poland)	GK	Michał Buchalik	1	0	0	0	1	0
23	(Poland)	FW	Paweł Brożek	1	0	0	0	1	0
			TOTALS	80	5	0	0	80	5
