= Michał Miśkiewicz =

Polish footballer (born 1989)

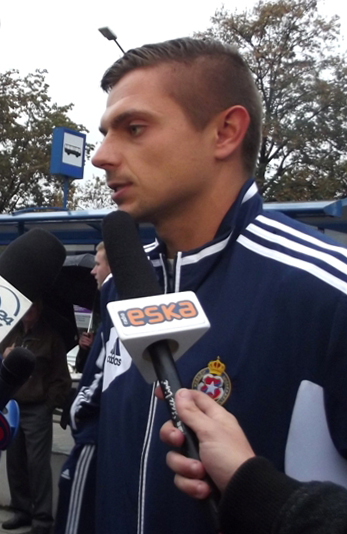
- Miśkiewicz in 2013

Personal information
- Full name: Michał Adam Miśkiewicz
- Date of birth: 20 January 1989 (age 37)
- Place of birth: Kraków, Poland
- Height: 1.94 m (6 ft 4 1/2 in)
- Position: Goalkeeper

Team information
- Current team: Wieczysta Kraków (goalkeeping coach)

Youth career
- Kmita Zabierzów
- 2007–2009: Milan

Senior career*
Years	Team	Apps	(Gls)
2009–2012	Milan	0	(0)
2009–2010	→ Chievo (loan)	0	(0)
2010–2011	→ Crociati Noceto (loan)	4	(0)
2011–2012	→ Südtirol (loan)	1	(0)
2012–2014	Wisła Kraków	45	(0)
2015–2017	Wisła Kraków	26	(0)
2015–2017	Wisła Kraków II	10	(0)
2017–2018	Feirense	2	(0)
2018–2019	Korona Kielce	8	(0)
2018–2019	Korona Kielce II	16	(0)
2019–2022	Wieczysta Kraków	26	(0)
Total		138	(0)

International career
2007	Poland U19	1	(0)
2014	Poland	1	(0)
- * Club domestic league appearances and goals

Michał Adam Miśkiewicz (born 20 January 1989) is a Polish former professional footballer who played as a goalkeeper. He currently serves as the goalkeeping coach of Ekstraklasa club Wieczysta Kraków.

== Club career ==
Born in Kraków, Miśkiewicz joined Italian Serie A club Milan from Polish Kmita Zabierzów at the beginning of the 2007–08 season. He spent two season in the club's youth system and was a member of the under-19 side who won the Campionato Berretti final in 2009, as well as playing some games for the under-20 side.

In July 2009, Miśkiewicz was sent out on loan to Chievo, but he went on to make no appearances for the first team throughout the season and instead played mainly for the youth team.

At the beginning of the 2010–11 season, Miśkiewicz was loaned out again, this time to Seconda Divisione club Crociati Noceto. He made his official debut for the club on 18 August 2010, in the second game of the Coppa Italia Lega Pro group stage against Carpi, which Crociati Noceto lost 1–0. Serving mainly as Luca Babbini's understudy, his league debut came only on 27 March 2011, in a 1–0 home loss against L'Aquila.

On June 19, 2012, he signed a two-year contract with Ekstraklasa club, Wisła Kraków.

On 13 September 2019, Miśkiewicz joined Polish club Wieczysta Kraków.

== International career ==
Miśkiewicz made one appearance for the Poland national under-19 football team which came in a 3–1 win over Russia in August 2007.

== Career statistics ==
Appearances and goals by club, season and competition
Club	Season	League			National cup (Note: Includes Coppa Italia, Polish Cup, Taça de Portugal)		Other		Total	
Club	Season	Division	Apps	Goals	Apps	Goals	Apps	Goals	Apps	Goals
Chievo (loan)	2009–10	Serie A	0	0	0	0	—		0	0
Crociati Noceto (loan)	2010–11	Lega Pro Divisione 2	4	0	3	0	—		7	0
Südtirol (loan)	2011–12	Lega Pro Divisione 1	1	0	1	0	—		2	0
Wisła Kraków	2012–13	Ekstraklasa	8	0	1	0	—		9	0
Wisła Kraków	2013–14	Ekstraklasa	37	0	2	0	—		39	0
Wisła Kraków	2014–15	Ekstraklasa	1	0	0	0	—		1	0
Wisła Kraków	2015–16	Ekstraklasa	16	0	0	0	—		16	0
Wisła Kraków	2016–17	Ekstraklasa	9	0	0	0	—		9	0
Wisła Kraków	Total		71	0	3	0	—		74	0
Wisła Kraków II	2014–15	III liga, gr. G	2	0	—		—		2	0
Wisła Kraków II	2015–16	III liga, gr. G	8	0	—		—		8	0
Wisła Kraków II	Total		10	0	—		—		10	0
Feirense	2017–18	Primeira Liga	2	0	1	0	3 (Note: Appearances in Taça da Liga)	0	6	0
Korona Kielce	2018–19	Ekstraklasa	8	0	0	0	—		8	0
Korona Kielce II	2018–19	IV liga Świętokrzyskie	16	0	—		—		16	0
Wieczysta Kraków	2019–20	Regional league Kraków II	7	0	—		—		7	0
Wieczysta Kraków	2020–21	Regional league Kraków II	16	0	—		—		16	0
Wieczysta Kraków	2021–22	IV liga Lesser Poland West	3	0	0	0	—		3	0
Wieczysta Kraków	Total		26	0	—		—		26	0
Career total			138	0	8	0	3	0	149	0

== Honours ==
Milan U19

- Campionato Berretti: 2008–09

Korona Kielce II

- IV liga Świętokrzyskie: 2018–19

Wieczysta Kraków

- IV liga Lesser Poland West: 2021–22
- Regional league Kraków II: 2020–21
- Polish Cup (Lesser Poland regionals): 2020–21
- Polish Cup (Kraków District regionals): 2020–21
- Polish Cup (Kraków regionals): 2019–20
