= Arkadiusz Głowacki =

Polish footballer (born 1979)

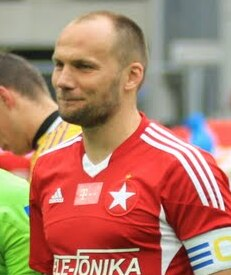
- Głowacki in 2015 with Wisła Kraków

Personal information
- Full name: Arkadiusz Rafał Głowacki
- Date of birth: 13 March 1979 (age 47)
- Place of birth: Poznań, Poland
- Height: 1.86 m (6 ft 1 in)
- Position: Defender

Youth career
- TPS Winogrady
- SKS 13 Poznań
- 1995–1997: Lech Poznań

Senior career*
Years	Team	Apps	(Gls)
1997–1999	Lech Poznań	75	(1)
2000–2010	Wisła Kraków	204	(6)
2010–2012	Trabzonspor	33	(2)
2012–2018	Wisła Kraków	156	(7)
Total		468	(16)

International career
1993–1994	Poland U15	4	(0)
1994–1995	Poland U16	17	(0)
1995–1997	Poland U17	21	(2)
1996–1998	Poland U18	23	(3)
1998	Poland U20	1	(0)
1998–2001	Poland U21	32	(5)
2002–2011	Poland	29	(0)
- * Club domestic league appearances and goals

Arkadiusz Rafał Głowacki (Polish pronunciation: [arˈkadjuʐ ɡwɔˈvat͡skʲi]; born 13 March 1979) is a Polish former professional footballer who played as a defender.

== Club career ==
Głowacki made his Ekstraklasa debut on 7 May 1997 in a match against Amica Wronki. In 2000, he moved to Wisła Kraków from Lech Poznań. In 2005 Głowacki was chosen as the new Wisła Kraków captain. He was named to the Ekstraklasa Best XI in the 2007–08 season as well as in 2009 in Polish Footballers' Association voting. In 2009, he was chosen the best defender in Poland by Ekstraklasa players. During his eleven seasons at Wisła Kraków, Głowacki won the Ekstraklasa championship six times.

On 15 June 2010, he signed a two-year contract with Turkish club Trabzonspor. Głowacki made his debut for the club in the 2010 Turkish Super Cup final, starting alongside Egemen Korkmaz in the heart of the defense. Głowacki spent two seasons at Trabzonspor, playing in the UEFA Champions League group stage in 2011–12.

== International career ==
Głowacki made his debut for the Poland national team in 2002, and subsequently he was called up to the 23-man squad for 2002 FIFA World Cup. He played regularly for the national team until 2006 when Leo Beenhakker gave up him after only one match. After Beenhakker was sacked, Głowacki received a recall to the national side for the 2010 FIFA World Cup qualifiers against the Czech Republic and Slovakia by interim Polish manager Stefan Majewski. He earned his 20th and 21st caps as a starter in both matches which saw Poland succumb to defeat, ending their World Cup qualification hopes. New manager Franciszek Smuda had also selected him to play against Romania and Canada, but he sustained an injury in club action which ruled him out for those matches.

== Career statistics ==
=== Club ===
Appearances and goals by club, season and competition
Club	Season	League			National cup (Note: Includes Polish Cup, Turkish Cup)		Europe		Other		Total	
Club	Season	Division	Apps	Goals	Apps	Goals	Apps	Goals	Apps	Goals	Apps	Goals
Lech Poznań	1996–97	Ekstraklasa	7	0	—		—		—		7	0
Lech Poznań	1997–98	Ekstraklasa	25	0	2	0	—		—		27	0
Lech Poznań	1998–99	Ekstraklasa	30	1	1	0	—		—		31	1
Lech Poznań	1999–2000	Ekstraklasa	13	0	1	0	4 (Note: Appearances in UEFA Cup)	0	0	0	18	0
Lech Poznań	Total		75	1	4	0	4	0	0	0	83	1
Wisła Kraków	1999–2000	Ekstraklasa	6	2	3	0	—		—		9	2
Wisła Kraków	2000–01	Ekstraklasa	17	0	1	0	6	0	4 (Note: Appearances in Polish League Cup)	0	28	0
Wisła Kraków	2001–02	Ekstraklasa	25	0	6	0	7 (Note: Four appearances and one goal in UEFA Champions League, three appearances in UEFA Cup)	1	2	0	40	1
Wisła Kraków	2002–03	Ekstraklasa	27	0	6	0	10	0	—		43	0
Wisła Kraków	2003–04	Ekstraklasa	14	0	0	0	2	0	—		16	0
Wisła Kraków	2004–05	Ekstraklasa	18	0	6	2	6 (Note: Four appearances in UEFA Champions League, two appearances in UEFA Cup)	0	—		30	2
Wisła Kraków	2005–06	Ekstraklasa	12	0	3	0	4 (Note: Two appearances in UEFA Champions League, two appearances in UEFA Cup)	0	—		19	0
Wisła Kraków	2006–07	Ekstraklasa	17	1	0	0	4	0	4 (Note: Appearances in Ekstraklasa Cup)	0	25	1
Wisła Kraków	2007–08	Ekstraklasa	26	0	6	0	—		2	0	34	0
Wisła Kraków	2008–09	Ekstraklasa	19	1	4	1	2 (Note: One appearance in UEFA Champions League, one appearance in UEFA Cup)	0	3	1	28	3
Wisła Kraków	2009–10	Ekstraklasa	23	2	2	0	1 (Note: Appearance in UEFA Champions League)	0	1 (Note: Appearance in Polish Super Cup)	0	27	2
Wisła Kraków	Total		204	6	37	3	42	1	16	1	299	11
Trabzonspor	2010–11	Süper Lig	15	2	4	0	1 (Note: Appearance in UEFA Europa League)	0	—		20	2
Trabzonspor	2011–12	Süper Lig	18	0	0	0	9 (Note: Two appearances in UEFA Champions League, seven appearances in UEFA Europa League)	0	—		27	0
Trabzonspor	Total		33	2	4	0	10	0	—		47	2
Wisła Kraków	2012–13	Ekstraklasa	20	0	3	0	—		—		23	0
Wisła Kraków	2013–14	Ekstraklasa	26	3	1	0	—		—		27	3
Wisła Kraków	2014–15	Ekstraklasa	34	1	0	0	—		—		34	1
Wisła Kraków	2015–16	Ekstraklasa	32	1	0	0	—		—		32	1
Wisła Kraków	2016–17	Ekstraklasa	27	2	2	0	—		—		29	2
Wisła Kraków	2017–18	Ekstraklasa	17	0	0	0	—		—		17	0
Wisła Kraków	Total		156	7	6	0	—		—		162	7
Career total			468	16	51	3	56	1	16	1	591	21

=== International ===
Appearances and goals by national team and year
National team	Year	Apps	Goals
Poland	2002	6	0
Poland	2003	5	0
Poland	2004	5	0
Poland	2005	2	0
Poland	2006	1	0
Poland	2007	0	0
Poland	2008	0	0
Poland	2009	2	0
Poland	2010	0	0
Poland	2011	8	0
Total		29	0

== Honours ==
Wisła Kraków

- Ekstraklasa: 2000–01, 2002–03, 2003–04, 2004–05, 2007–08, 2008–09
- Polish Cup: 2001–02, 2002–03
- Polish League Cup: 2000–01

Trabzonspor

- Turkish Super Cup: 2010

Individual

- Ekstraklasa Defender of the Year/Season: 2009, 2013–14
- Ekstraklasa Best XI: 2007–08, 2009
- Ekstraklasa Hall of Fame: 2024
