= Rafał Boguski =

Polish footballer (born 1984)

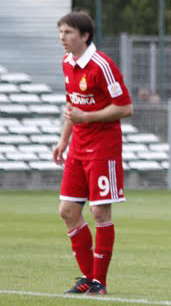
- Boguski with Wisła Kraków in 2012

Personal information
- Full name: Rafał Boguski
- Date of birth: 9 June 1984 (age 42)
- Place of birth: Ostrołęka, Poland
- Height: 1.73 m (5 ft 8 in)
- Position: Forward

Team information
- Current team: Świt Krzeszowice (player-manager)
- Number: 6

Youth career
- ŁKS Łomża

Senior career*
Years	Team	Apps	(Gls)
2000–2005	ŁKS Łomża	118	(61)
2005–2021	Wisła Kraków	335	(57)
2005–2006	→ ŁKS Łomża (loan)	14	(8)
2006–2007	→ GKS Bełchatów (loan)	20	(4)
2021–2023	Puszcza Niepołomice	38	(3)
2023–2024	Kalwarianka Kalwaria Z.	17	(6)
2024–	Świt Krzeszowice	19	(3)

International career
2007–2009	Poland	6	(3)

Managerial career
- 2024–: Świt Krzeszowice (player-manager)
- * Club domestic league appearances and goals as of 21:23, 30 June 2026 (UTC)

Rafał Boguski (born 9 June 1984) is a Polish professional footballer who is the current player-manager of V liga Lesser Poland club Świt Krzeszowice. Mainly a forward, he also plays as a second striker and as a winger.

== Club career ==
Born in Ostrołęka, Boguski began his career at ŁKS Łomża before moving to Ekstraklasa champions Wisła Kraków in 2005. In the 2006–07 season. he was loaned out to GKS Bełchatów where he contributed four goals in 20 matches for the eventual league runners-up. In the following season, he returned to Wisła Kraków and won his first Ekstraklasa title with the club.

== International career ==
He made his first appearance for the Poland national team in a friendly against Bosnia and Herzegovina on 15 December 2007. He scored his first international goal on 14 December 2008 against Serbia. Boguski scored the fastest goal in Polish history, finding the back of the net after only 23 seconds against San Marino on 1 April 2009.

== Career statistics ==
=== Club ===
As of match played 13 June 2026

Appearances and goals by club, season and competition
Club	Season	League			Polish Cup		Europe		Other		Total	
Club	Season	Division	Apps	Goals	Apps	Goals	Apps	Goals	Apps	Goals	Apps	Goals
ŁKS Łomża	2000–01	IV liga Podlasie	16 (Note: Doesn't include these matches: ŁKS Łomża - Unia Ciechanowiec 3–1, ŁKS Łomża - Pogoń Łapy 4–0, Jagiellonia Białystok II - ŁKS Łomża 2–0, ŁKS Łomża - Włókiarz Białystok 1–3)	6	—		—		—		16	6
ŁKS Łomża	2001–02	IV liga Podlasie	25 (Note: Doesn't include these matches: Panorama Mielnik - ŁKS Łomża 2–3, ŁKS Łomża - KS Stawiski 2–0, Jagiellonia Białystok II - ŁKS Łomża 2–2)	6	—		—		—		25	6
ŁKS Łomża	2002–03	IV liga Podlasie	26	19	—		—		—		26	19
ŁKS Łomża	2003–04	IV liga Podlasie	22 (Note: Doesn't include this match: ŁKS Łomża - Olimpia Zambrów 2–0)	19	—		—		—		22	19
ŁKS Łomża	2004–05	III liga, gr. I	29	11	—		—		—		29	11
ŁKS Łomża	2005–06	III liga, gr. I	14	8	—		—		—		14	8
ŁKS Łomża	Total		132	69	—		—		—		132	69
Wisła Kraków	2005–06	Ekstraklasa	2	0	0	0	0	0	—		2	0
Wisła Kraków	2007–08	Ekstraklasa	27	3	7	0	—		5 (Note: Appearance(s) in Ekstraklasa Cup)	1	39	4
Wisła Kraków	2008–09	Ekstraklasa	25	9	3	0	6 (Note: Four appearances in UEFA Champions League, two appearances in UEFA Cup)	0	1	0	35	9
Wisła Kraków	2009–10	Ekstraklasa	18	5	2	0	0	0	0	0	20	5
Wisła Kraków	2010–11	Ekstraklasa	8	1	1	0	4 (Note: Appearances in UEFA Europa League)	2	—		13	3
Wisła Kraków	2011–12	Ekstraklasa	6	1	1	0	2	0	—		9	1
Wisła Kraków	2012–13	Ekstraklasa	26	3	6	4	—		—		32	7
Wisła Kraków	2013–14	Ekstraklasa	21	1	0	0	—		—		21	1
Wisła Kraków	2014–15	Ekstraklasa	36	5	0	0	—		—		36	5
Wisła Kraków	2015–16	Ekstraklasa	36	9	1	0	—		—		37	9
Wisła Kraków	2016–17	Ekstraklasa	36	12	4	1	—		—		40	13
Wisła Kraków	2017–18	Ekstraklasa	30	4	2	0	—		—		32	4
Wisła Kraków	2018–19	Ekstraklasa	27	2	1	0	—		—		28	2
Wisła Kraków	2019–20	Ekstraklasa	26	0	1	0	—		—		27	0
Wisła Kraków	2020–21	Ekstraklasa	11	2	1	0	—		—		12	2
Wisła Kraków	Total		335	57	30	5	12	2	6	1	383	65
GKS Bełchatów (loan)	2006–07	Ekstraklasa	20	4	1	0	—		6	2	27	6
Puszcza Niepołomice	2021–22	I liga	23	2	1	0	—		—		24	2
Puszcza Niepołomice	2022–23	I liga	15	1	2	0	—		—		17	1
Puszcza Niepołomice	Total		38	3	3	0	—		—		41	3
Kalwarianka	2023–24	IV liga Lesser Poland	17	5	—		—		—		17	5
Świt Krzeszowice	2024–25	Regional league Kr. I	17	3	—		—		0	0	17	3
Świt Krzeszowice	2025–26	V liga Lesser Poland West	2	0	—		—		—		2	0
Świt Krzeszowice	Total		19	3	—		—		0	0	19	3
Career total			561	141	34	5	12	2	12	3	619	151

=== International ===
Appearances and goals by national team and year
National team	Year	Apps	Goals
Poland
Poland	2007	1	0
Poland	2008	2	1
Poland	2009	3	2
Total		6	3

Poland score listed first, score column indicates score after each Boguski goal.

List of international goals scored by Rafał Boguski
No.	Date	Venue	Opponent	Score	Result	Competition
1	14 December 2008	Mardan Sports Complex, Aksu, Turkey	Serbia	1–0	1–0	Friendly
2	1 April 2009	Stadion Miejski, Kielce, Poland	San Marino	1–0	10–0	2010 FIFA World Cup qualification
3	1 April 2009	Stadion Miejski, Kielce, Poland	San Marino	3–0	10–0	2010 FIFA World Cup qualification

== Managerial statistics ==
As of match played 13 June 2026

Managerial record by team and tenure
Team	From	To	Record							
Team	From	To	G	W	D	L	GF	GA	GD	Win %
Świt Krzeszowice (player-manager)	24 June 2024	Present	62	35	9	18	144	86	+58	56.45
Total			62	35	9	18	144	86	+58	56.45

== Honours ==
ŁKS Łomża

- IV liga Podlasie: 2003–04

Wisła Kraków

- Ekstraklasa: 2007–08, 2008–09, 2010–11

Individual

- IV liga Podlasie top goalscorer: 2003–04
