= Michał Czekaj =

Polish footballer (born 1992)

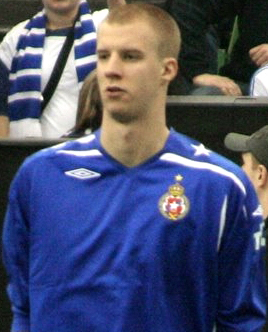
- Czekaj with Wisła Kraków in 2010

Personal information
- Full name: Michał Czekaj
- Date of birth: 13 February 1992 (age 34)
- Place of birth: Kraków, Poland
- Height: 1.95 m (6 ft 5 in)
- Position: Centre-back

Team information
- Current team: Bronowianka Kraków

Youth career
- 1998–2011: Wisła Kraków

Senior career*
Years	Team	Apps	(Gls)
2009–2016	Wisła Kraków	27	(0)
2013–2016	Wisła Kraków II	23	(1)
2017–2018	Rozwój Katowice	43	(0)
2018–2019	Garbarnia Kraków	13	(0)
2019–2021	Radunia Stężyca	35	(1)
2021–2023	Raków Częstochowa II	58	(7)
2023–2024	Garbarnia Kraków	30	(0)
2024–2025	Sparta Kazimierza Wielka	40	(2)
2026–	Bronowianka Kraków	0	(0)

International career
2008–2009	Poland U17	9	(0)
2009–2010	Poland U18	3	(0)
2009–2011	Poland U19	28	(0)
2011	Poland U20	2	(0)
- * Club domestic league appearances and goals as of 11:45, 19 October 2025 (UTC)

Michał Czekaj (born 13 February 1992) is a Polish professional footballer who plays as a centre-back for regional league club Bronowianka Kraków.

== Club career ==
Czekaj began his career when he was 6 years old at Wisła Kraków. In July 2009, he was promoted to Wisła's first team. On 2 August 2009 he played his first match for Wisła Kraków reserve team in Młoda Ekstraklasa.

He made his Ekstraklasa debut for Wisła on 20 August 2011 in a match against Korona Kielce.

== International career ==
Czekaj made his debut for the Poland U17s on 27 August 2008 in a match against Hungary. He played in all three matches in UEFA European Under-17 Championship elite round. In May 2009 he played for Poland national under-18 football team in two matches against Hungary. On 13 August 2009, he made his debut for Poland U19s.

== Career statistics ==
As of match played 13 September 2025

Appearances and goals by club, season and competition
Club	Season	League			Polish Cup		Europe		Other		Total	
Club	Season	Division	Apps	Goals	Apps	Goals	Apps	Goals	Apps	Goals	Apps	Goals
Wisła Kraków	2011–12	Ekstraklasa	11	0	4	0	2 (Note: Appearances in UEFA Europa League)	0	—		17	0
Wisła Kraków	2012–13	Ekstraklasa	8	0	2	0	—		—		10	0
Wisła Kraków	2013–14	Ekstraklasa	7	0	0	0	—		—		7	0
Wisła Kraków	2014–15	Ekstraklasa	1	0	1	0	—		—		2	0
Wisła Kraków	2015–16	Ekstraklasa	0	0	1	0	—		—		1	0
Wisła Kraków	Total		27	0	8	0	2	0	—		37	0
Wisła Kraków II	2013–14	III liga, group G	7	1	—		—		—		7	1
Wisła Kraków II	2014–15	III liga, group G	10	0	—		—		—		10	0
Wisła Kraków II	2015–16	III liga, group G	6	0	—		—		—		6	0
Wisła Kraków II	Total		23	1	—		—		—		23	1
Rozwój Katowice	2016–17	II liga	15	0	—		—		—		15	0
Rozwój Katowice	2017–18	II liga	28	0	0	0	—		—		28	0
Rozwój Katowice	Total		43	0	0	0	—		—		43	0
Garbarnia Kraków	2018–19	I liga	13	0	1	0	—		—		14	0
Radunia Stężyca	2019–20	III liga, group II	17	0	—		—		—		17	0
Radunia Stężyca	2020–21	III liga, group II	18	1	—		—		—		18	1
Radunia Stężyca	Total		35	1	—		—		—		35	1
Raków Częstochowa II	2021–22	IV liga Silesia I	30	4	—		—		—		30	4
Raków Częstochowa II	2022–23	III liga, group III	28	3	—		—		—		28	3
Raków Częstochowa II	Total		58	7	—		—		—		58	7
Garbarnia Kraków	2023–24	III liga, group IV	30	0	3	0	—		—		33	0
Sparta Kazimierza Wielka	2024–25	IV liga Świętokrzyskie	34	2	—		—		—		34	2
Sparta Kazimierza Wielka	2025–26	III liga, group IV	6	0	—		—		—		6	0
Sparta Kazimierza Wielka	Total		40	2	—		—		—		40	2
Bronowianka Kraków	2026–27	Regional league	0	0	—		—		—		0	0
Total			269	11	12	0	2	0	—		283	11

== Honours ==
Radunia Stężyca

- III liga, group II: 2020–21

Raków Częstochowa II

- IV liga Silesia I: 2021–22
- Polish Cup (Częstochowa regionals): 2021–22

Sparta Kazimierza Wielka

- IV liga Świętokrzyskie: 2024–25
