= Łukasz Garguła =

Polish footballer (born 1981)

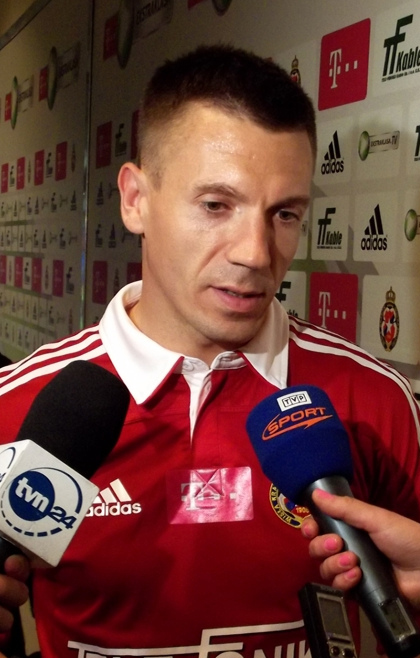
- Garguła with Wisła Kraków in 2012

Personal information
- Date of birth: 25 February 1981 (age 45)
- Place of birth: Żagań, Poland
- Height: 1.77 m (5 ft 9 1/2 in)
- Position: Midfielder

Team information
- Current team: Piast Iłowa
- Number: 6

Youth career
- Piast Iłowa
- SMS Wrocław

Senior career*
| Years | Team | Apps | (Gls) |
| 1999–2002 | Polar Wrocław | 37 | (4) |
| 2002–2009 | GKS Bełchatów | 182 | (32) |
| 2009–2015 | Wisła Kraków | 127 | (17) |
| 2015–2019 | Miedź Legnica | 95 | (10) |
| 2019–2021 | Lechia Zielona Góra | 29 | (1) |
| 2022–2023 | Piast Iłowa | 17 | (1) |
| 2023–2025 | Zorza Ochla | 50 | (12) |
| 2025– | Piast Iłowa | 30 | (2) |

International career
| 1997 | Poland U15 | 5 | (1) |
| 1997–1998 | Poland U16 | 12 | (2) |
| 1998–1999 | Poland U17 | 13 | (2) |
| 1999 | Poland U18 | 6 | (0) |
| 2000 | Poland U20 | 2 | (0) |
| 2002–2003 | Poland U21 | 14 | (3) |
| 2004–2005 | Poland B | 2 | (0) |
| 2006–2009 | Poland | 16 | (1) |
- * Club domestic league appearances and goals as of 21:28, 30 June 2026 (UTC)

Łukasz Garguła (Polish pronunciation: [ˈwukaʐ ɡarˈɡuwa]; born 25 February 1981) is a Polish professional footballer who plays as a central midfielder for IV liga Lubusz club Piast Iłowa.

== Club career ==
Garguła started his footballing career in Piast Iłowa and played a three seasons for Polar Wrocław.

GKS Bełchatów signed him in 2002 and in 2005 he managed to ascend with the team to the Ekstraklasa (the premier division in Poland). In the 06–07 season the team finished second in the league.

In 2009, he signed for Wisła Kraków. On July 1, 2015, Garguła signed a 1-year contract with Miedz Legnica and an option on a year extension.

In July 2019, Garguła joined Lechia Zielona Góra.

== International career ==
On 2 September 2006, Garguła made his international debut in a match against Finland, a match which Poland lost 1–3 and where he also scored his first and only goal for his country.

He was called up to participate at Euro 2008 by Leo Beenhakker, however he was the only Polish player, along with Górnik Zabrze defender Michał Pazdan, who did not play in the whole tournament.

== Career statistics ==
=== Club ===
As of match played 6 June 2026

Appearances and goals by club, season and competition
| Club | Season | League | | | Polish Cup | | Europe | | Other | | Total | |
| Club | Season | Division | Apps | Goals | Apps | Goals | Apps | Goals | Apps | Goals | Apps | Goals |
|---|---|---|---|---|---|---|---|---|---|---|---|---|
| Polar Wrocław | 1999–00 | II liga | 2 | 0 | — | | — | | — | | 2 | 0 |
| Polar Wrocław | 2000–01 | II liga | 3 | 0 | 1 | 0 | — | | — | | 4 | 0 |
| Polar Wrocław | 2001–02 | II liga | 32 | 4 | 2 | 0 | — | | 2 (Note: Appearances in Polish League Cup) | 1 | 36 | 5 |
| Polar Wrocław | Total | | 37 | 4 | 3 | 0 | — | | 2 | 1 | 42 | 5 |
| GKS Bełchatów | 2002–03 | II liga | 30 | 6 | 1 | 1 | — | | — | | 31 | 7 |
| GKS Bełchatów | 2003–04 | II liga | 23 | 3 | 0 | 0 | — | | — | | 23 | 3 |
| GKS Bełchatów | 2004–05 | II liga | 34 | 7 | 7 | 0 | — | | — | | 41 | 7 |
| GKS Bełchatów | 2005–06 | Ekstraklasa | 28 | 2 | 2 | 0 | — | | — | | 30 | 2 |
| GKS Bełchatów | 2006–07 | Ekstraklasa | 27 | 7 | 0 | 0 | — | | 3 (Note: Appearances in Ekstraklasa Cup) | 0 | 30 | 7 |
| GKS Bełchatów | 2007–08 | Ekstraklasa | 26 | 3 | 1 | 0 | 1 (Note: Appearance(s) in UEFA Europa League) | 0 | 0 | 0 | 28 | 3 |
| GKS Bełchatów | 2008–09 | Ekstraklasa | 14 | 4 | 0 | 0 | — | | 2 | 0 | 16 | 4 |
| GKS Bełchatów | Total | | 182 | 32 | 11 | 1 | 1 | 0 | 5 | 0 | 199 | 33 |
| Wisła Kraków | 2009–10 | Ekstraklasa | 2 | 0 | 1 | 0 | — | | 0 | 0 | 3 | 0 |
| Wisła Kraków | 2010–11 | Ekstraklasa | 14 | 0 | 4 | 0 | 2 | 0 | — | | 20 | 0 |
| Wisła Kraków | 2011–12 | Ekstraklasa | 25 | 0 | 5 | 0 | 9 (Note: Two appearances in UEFA Champions League, seven appearances and one goal in UEFA Europa League) | 1 | 0 | 0 | 39 | 1 |
| Wisła Kraków | 2012–13 | Ekstraklasa | 22 | 4 | 2 | 1 | — | | — | | 24 | 5 |
| Wisła Kraków | 2013–14 | Ekstraklasa | 34 | 10 | 1 | 2 | — | | — | | 35 | 12 |
| Wisła Kraków | 2014–15 | Ekstraklasa | 30 | 3 | 1 | 0 | — | | — | | 31 | 3 |
| Wisła Kraków | Total | | 127 | 17 | 14 | 3 | 11 | 1 | 0 | 0 | 152 | 21 |
| Miedź Legnica | 2015–16 | I liga | 29 | 5 | 2 | 0 | — | | — | | 31 | 5 |
| Miedź Legnica | 2016–17 | I liga | 30 | 2 | 1 | 0 | — | | — | | 31 | 2 |
| Miedź Legnica | 2017–18 | I liga | 24 | 2 | 2 | 2 | — | | — | | 26 | 4 |
| Miedź Legnica | 2018–19 | Ekstraklasa | 12 | 0 | 2 | 1 | — | | — | | 14 | 1 |
| Miedź Legnica | Total | | 95 | 9 | 7 | 3 | — | | — | | 102 | 12 |
| Miedź Legnica II | 2018–19 | III liga, gr. III | 2 | 0 | — | | — | | — | | 2 | 0 |
| Lechia Zielona Góra | 2019–20 | III liga, gr. III | 17 | 1 | — | | — | | — | | 17 | 1 |
| Lechia Zielona Góra | 2020–21 | III liga, gr. III | 12 | 0 | — | | — | | — | | 12 | 0 |
| Lechia Zielona Góra | Total | | 29 | 1 | — | | — | | — | | 29 | 1 |
| Piast Iłowa | 2022–23 | IV liga Lubusz | 17 | 1 | — | | — | | — | | 17 | 1 |
| Zorza Ochla | 2023–24 | Regional league ZL | 26 | 6 | — | | — | | — | | 26 | 6 |
| Zorza Ochla | 2024–25 | Regional league ZL | 24 | 6 | — | | — | | — | | 24 | 6 |
| Zorza Ochla | Total | | 50 | 12 | — | | — | | — | | 50 | 12 |
| Piast Iłowa | 2025–26 | IV liga Lubusz | 30 | 2 | — | | — | | — | | 30 | 2 |
| Career total | | | 569 | 78 | 35 | 7 | 12 | 1 | 7 | 1 | 623 | 87 |

=== International ===
Appearances and goals by national team and year
| National team | Year | Apps | Goals |
|---|---|---|---|
Poland
| Poland | 2006 | 3 | 1 |
| Poland | 2007 | 4 | 0 |
| Poland | 2008 | 7 | 0 |
| Poland | 2009 | 2 | 0 |
| Total | | 16 | 1 |

Scores and results list Poland's goal tally first, score column indicates score after each Garguła goal.

List of international goals scored by Łukasz Garguła
| No. | Date | Venue | Opponent | Score | Result | Competition |
|---|---|---|---|---|---|---|
| 1 | 2 September 2006 | Zdzisław Krzyszkowiak Stadium, Bydgoszcz, Poland | Finland | 1–3 | 1–3 | UEFA Euro 2008 qualifying |

== Honours ==
Wisła Kraków

- Ekstraklasa: 2010–11

Miedź Legnica

- I liga: 2017–18

Lechia Zielona Góra

- Polish Cup (Zielona Góra regionals): 2020–21
