= Jean Barrientos =

Uruguayan footballer (born 1990)

Personal information
- Full name: Jean Pierre Agustin Barrientos Díaz
- Date of birth: 16 September 1990 (age 36)
- Place of birth: Montevideo, Uruguay
- Height: 1.74 m (5 ft 9 in)
- Position: Midfielder

Team information
- Current team: Olympiacos Volos

Youth career
- –2009: Racing

Senior career*
Years	Team	Apps	(Gls)
2009–2011	Racing	51	(12)
2011–2015	Vitória Guimarães	69	(3)
2015–2016	Wisła Kraków	16	(1)
2015	Racing	15	(3)
2016	Club Olimpo	7	(0)
2016–2017	Melgar	35	(3)
2018–2019	Racing	22	(4)
2019–2020	Xanthi	37	(2)
2020–2024	Volos	83	(5)
2024–2025	AEL	18	(0)
2025–2026	Niki Volos	10	(1)
2026–	Olympiacos Volos	0	(0)
- * Club domestic league appearances and goals as of 21:00, 14 December 2025 (UTC)

Jean Pierre Agustin Barrientos Díaz (born 16 September 1990), commonly known as Jean Barrientos, is a Uruguayan professional footballer who plays as a midfielder.

== Career ==
Barrientos started his career playing with Racing in 2009. He made his debut on 22 August 2009, in a 1–1 away draw against Central Español. On 29 August 2009, playing his second official match, he scored his first goal in a 2–0 away win against Centro Atlético Fénix.

In June 2011, he signed a four-year contract with the Primeira Liga side Vitória de Guimarães.

On 31 July 2020, he joined Volos on a free transfer.

== Career statistics ==
As of 21 December 2013

Appearances and goals by club, season and competition
Club	Season	League		National cup		League cup		Continental		Total	
Club	Season	Apps	Goals	Apps	Goals	Apps	Goals	Apps	Goals	Apps	Goals
Racing de Montevideo	2009–10	23	3					8	0	31	3
Racing de Montevideo	2010–11	28	9							28	9
Vitória	2011–12	26	0	3	0	2	0	3	0	31	0
Vitória	2012–13	17	1	4	2	3	0			24	3
Vitória	2013–14	12	1	2	1	2	0	2	0	18	2
Career total		106	14	9	3	7	0	13	0	137	17

== Honours ==
Vitória Guimarães

- Taça de Portugal: 2012–13
