= Gerard Bieszczad =

Polish footballer

Personal information
- Full name: Gerard Bieszczad
- Date of birth: 5 February 1993 (age 33)
- Place of birth: Dębica, Poland
- Height: 1.94 m (6 ft 4 in)
- Position: Goalkeeper

Youth career
- Igloopol Dębica
- Lech Poznań

Senior career*
| Years | Team | Apps | (Gls) |
| 2010–2013 | Lech Poznań | 0 | (0) |
| 2011 | → Tur Turek (loan) | 13 | (0) |
| 2012 | → Sandecja Nowy Sącz (loan) | 6 | (0) |
| 2012 | → Warta Międzychód (loan) | | |
| 2013–2015 | Wisła Kraków | 1 | (0) |
| 2013–2015 | Wisła Kraków II | 33 | (0) |
| 2015–2017 | Bytovia Bytów | 53 | (0) |
| 2017–2019 | Zemplín Michalovce | 19 | (0) |
| 2019 | → Slavoj Trebišov (loan) | 10 | (0) |
| 2019–2025 | Stal Rzeszów | 19 | (0) |
| 2025 | Pogoń-Sokół Lubaczów | 8 | (0) |

International career
| 2008 | Poland U16 | 3 | (0) |
- * Club domestic league appearances and goals

Gerard Bieszczad (born 5 February 1993) is a Polish former professional footballer who played as a goalkeeper. He was most recently the goalkeeping coach of III liga club Pogoń-Sokół Lubaczów.

== Club career ==
Bieszczad began his career at hometown club Igloopol Dębica before moving to Lech Poznań. Subsequently, he was loaned out to Tur Turek, Sandecja Nowy Sącz and Warta Międzychód. Besides Poland, he has played in Slovakia.
