= Karol Mackiewicz =

Polish footballer

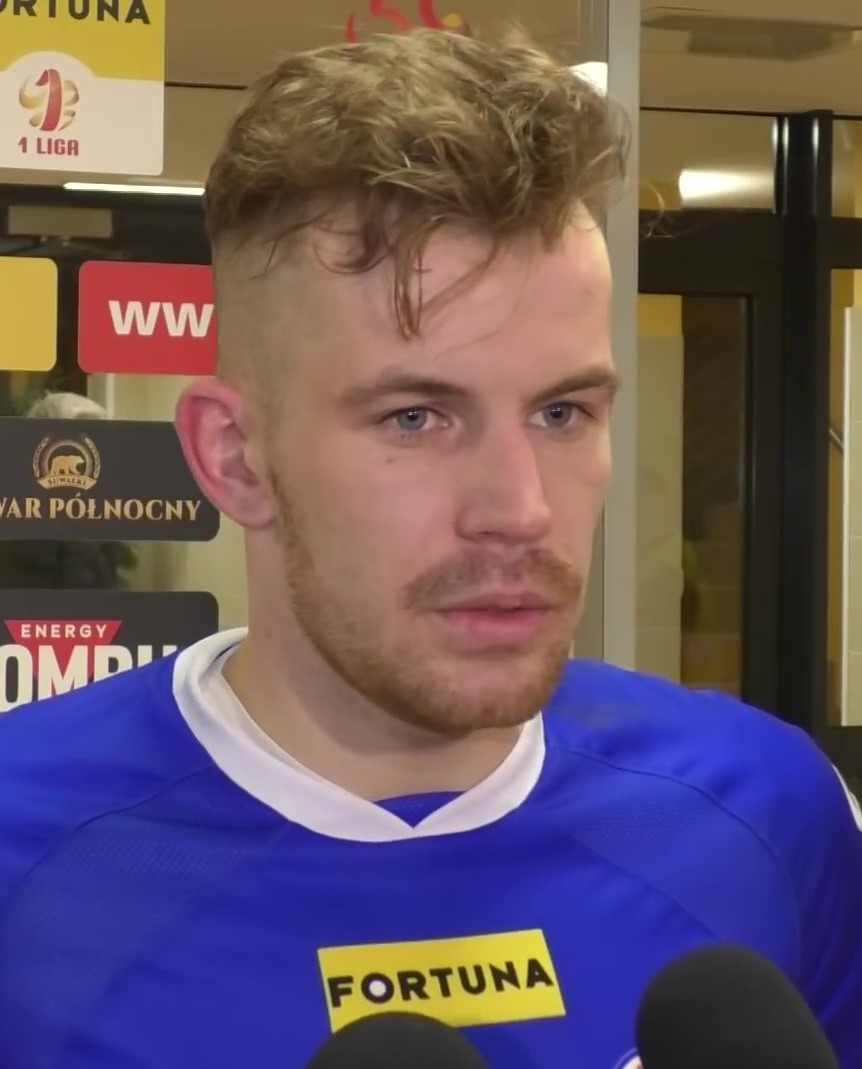
- Mackiewicz in 2019

Personal information
- Full name: Karol Mackiewicz
- Date of birth: 1 June 1992 (age 34)
- Place of birth: Białystok, Poland
- Height: 1.78 m (5 ft 10 in)
- Position: Left winger

Team information
- Current team: KS Grabówka

Youth career
- Hetman Białystok
- –2013: Jagiellonia Białystok

Senior career*
| Years | Team | Apps | (Gls) |
| 2013–2016 | Jagiellonia Białystok II | 20 | (11) |
| 2013–2019 | Jagiellonia Białystok | 57 | (2) |
| 2014–2015 | → Wigry Suwałki (loan) | 33 | (6) |
| 2017–2019 | → Wigry Suwałki (loan) | 37 | (3) |
| 2019 | Górnik Łęczna | 1 | (0) |
| 2020–2021 | Ruch Wysokie Mazowieckie | 29 | (4) |
| 2021–2022 | Olimpia Zambrów | 14 | (3) |
| 2022–2025 | Turośnianka Turośń Kościelna | 31 | (15) |
| 2026– | KS Grabówka | 0 | (0) |
- * Club domestic league appearances and goals as of 13:08, 25 July 2026 (UTC)

Karol Mackiewicz (born 1 June 1992) is a Polish professional footballer who plays as a left winger for Klasa A club KS Grabówka.

== Career ==
=== Ruch Wysokie Mazowieckie ===
Leaving Górnik Łęczna in December 2019, Mackiewicz began training with Ruch Wysokie Mazowieckie in the beginning of February 2020. Later on the month, he signed a deal with the club.

== Honours ==
Wigry Suwałki

- II liga East: 2013–14

Olimpia Zambrów

- IV liga Podlasie: 2021–22

Turośnianka Turośń Kościelna

- Regional league Podlasie: 2023–24
- Klasa A Podlasie II: 2022–23
