= Tomasz Zając =

Polish footballer (born 1995)

Personal information
- Date of birth: 14 July 1995 (age 31)
- Place of birth: Vienna, Austria
- Height: 1.70 m (5 ft 7 in)
- Position: Right winger

Team information
- Current team: Tur Milejów
- Number: 10

Youth career
- Świt Krzeszowice
- 2010–2011: Kmita Zabierzów
- 2011–2013: Wisła Kraków

Senior career*
| Years | Team | Apps | (Gls) |
| 2013–2015 | Wisła Kraków II | 40 | (17) |
| 2013–2015 | Wisła Kraków | 11 | (0) |
| 2015 | → Chrobry Głogów (loan) | 9 | (2) |
| 2015–2017 | Korona Kielce | 24 | (0) |
| 2017 | → Sandecja Nowy Sącz (loan) | 4 | (0) |
| 2017–2018 | Stomil Olsztyn | 28 | (1) |
| 2019 | Pogoń Siedlce | 9 | (0) |
| 2019 | Bałtyk Gdynia | 8 | (2) |
| 2020–2021 | Wisła Puławy | 33 | (5) |
| 2021–2024 | Avia Świdnik | 81 | (8) |
| 2024– | Tur Milejów | 55 | (40) |

International career
| 2014–2015 | Poland U20 | 5 | (1) |
- * Club domestic league appearances and goals as of 20:44, 27 June 2026 (UTC)

Tomasz Zając (born 14 July 1995) is a Polish professional footballer who plays as a right winger for IV liga Lublin club Tur Milejów.

== Honours ==
Wisła Puławy

- III liga, group IV: 2020–21
- Polish Cup (Lublin County regionals): 2020–21

Avia Świdnik

- Polish Cup (Lublin regionals): 2023–24
- Polish Cup (Lublin County regionals): 2023–24

Tur Milejów

- Regional league Lublin: 2024–25
