= Stadion Miejski (Kielce) =

Multi-purpose stadium in Kielce, Poland

Coordinates: 50°51′41″N 20°37′29″E

- EXBUD Arena
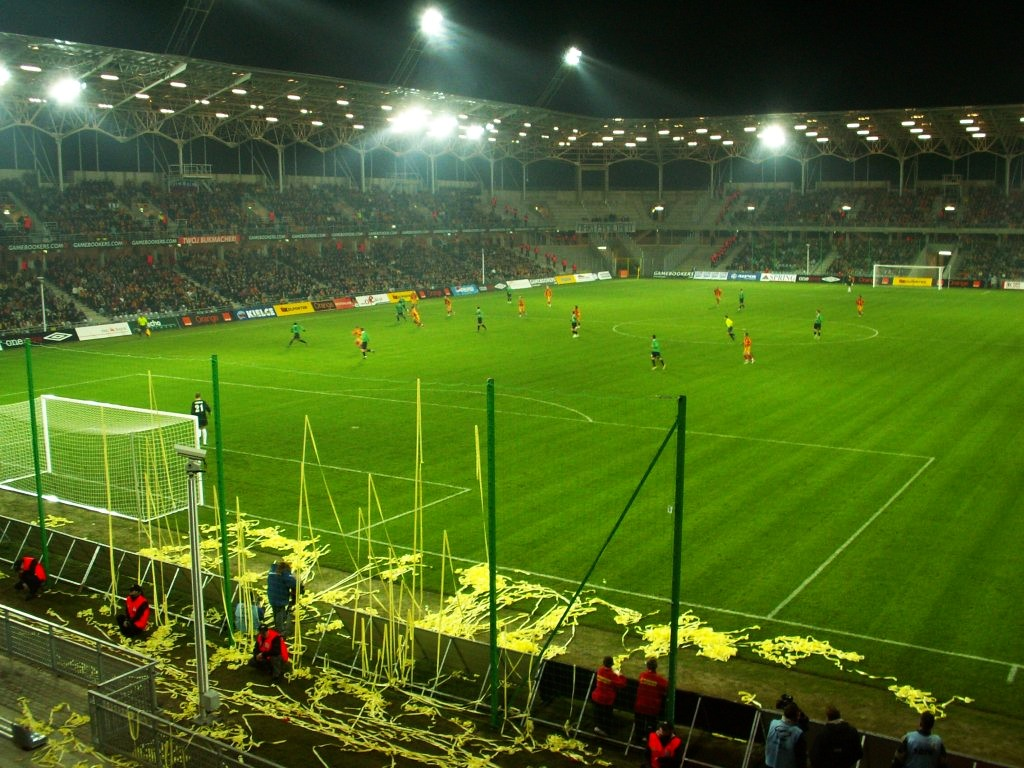
- Interactive map of Stadion Miejski
- Full name: Stadion Miejski w Kielcach
- Former names: Kolporter Arena (January 2014 - June 2018); Suzuki Arena (1 November 2018 - 24 June 2024)
- Location: Ks. P. Ściegiennego Str. 8 Kielce, Poland
- Owner: City of Kielce
- Operator: City of Kielce and Korona Kielce
- Capacity: 15,122
- Surface: Grass
- Field size: 105 m x 68 m

Construction
- Groundbreaking: 2004
- Built: 2004–2006
- Opened: 1 April 2006
- Cost: 48 mln PLN
- Architect: ATJ Architekci

Tenant
- Korona Kielce (2006–)

The Stadion Miejski (English: Municipal Stadium), named EXBUD Arena due to the sponsorship reasons, is a multi-purpose stadium in Kielce, Poland. It is currently used mostly for football matches and is the home ground of Korona Kielce. The stadium holds 15,500 spectators and was built in 2006. At the time, it was one of the most modern football stadiums in Poland.

On 1 April 2006, eighteen months to the day that construction started on the project, its inaugural match took place, an Ekstraklasa match between Korona and Zagłębie Lubin. The match finished in a 1–1 draw.

The old stadium of Korona is currently being used by Korona Kielce II (the reserve team).

== Facts ==
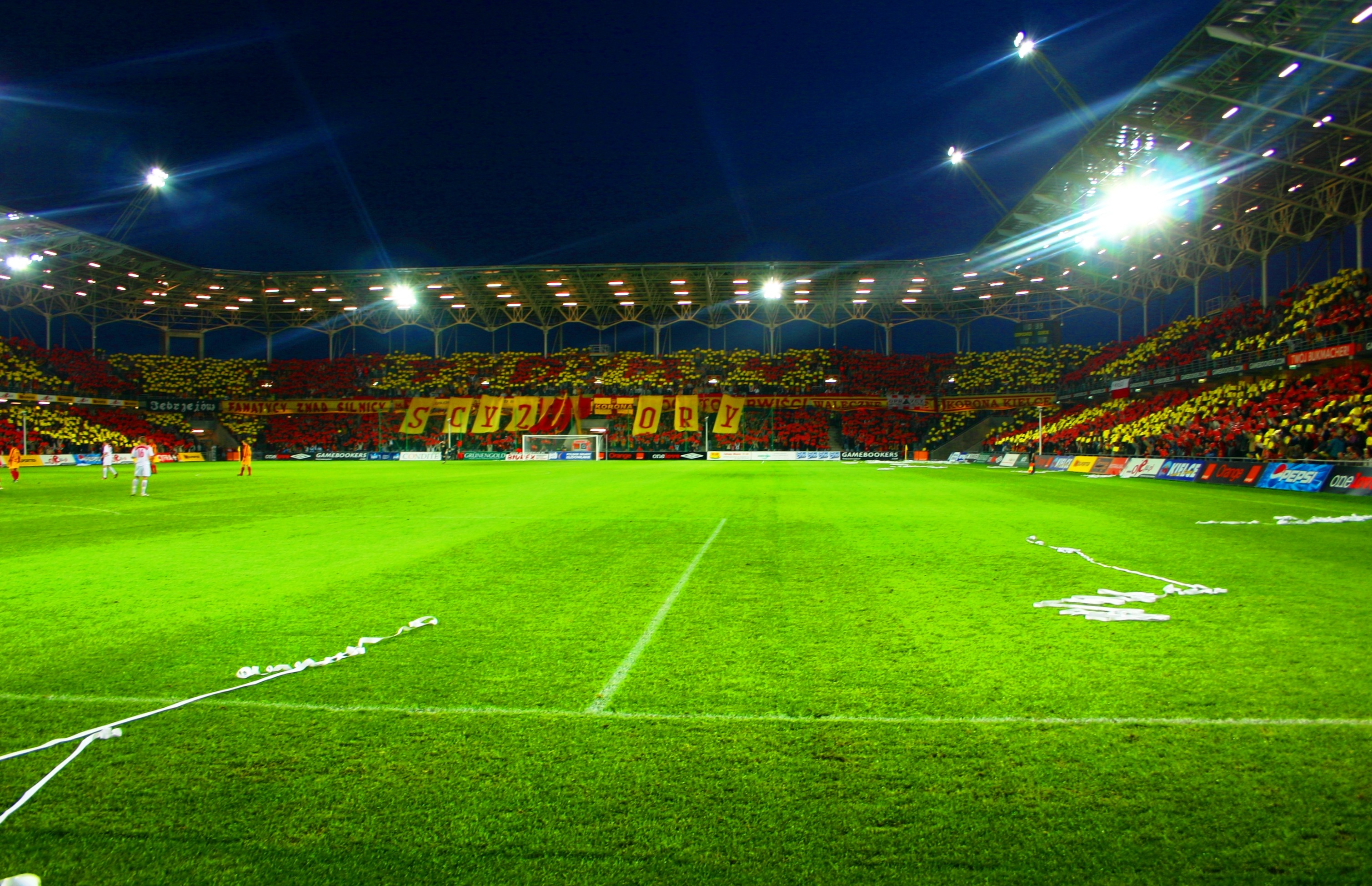
Korona Kielce–Wisła Kraków

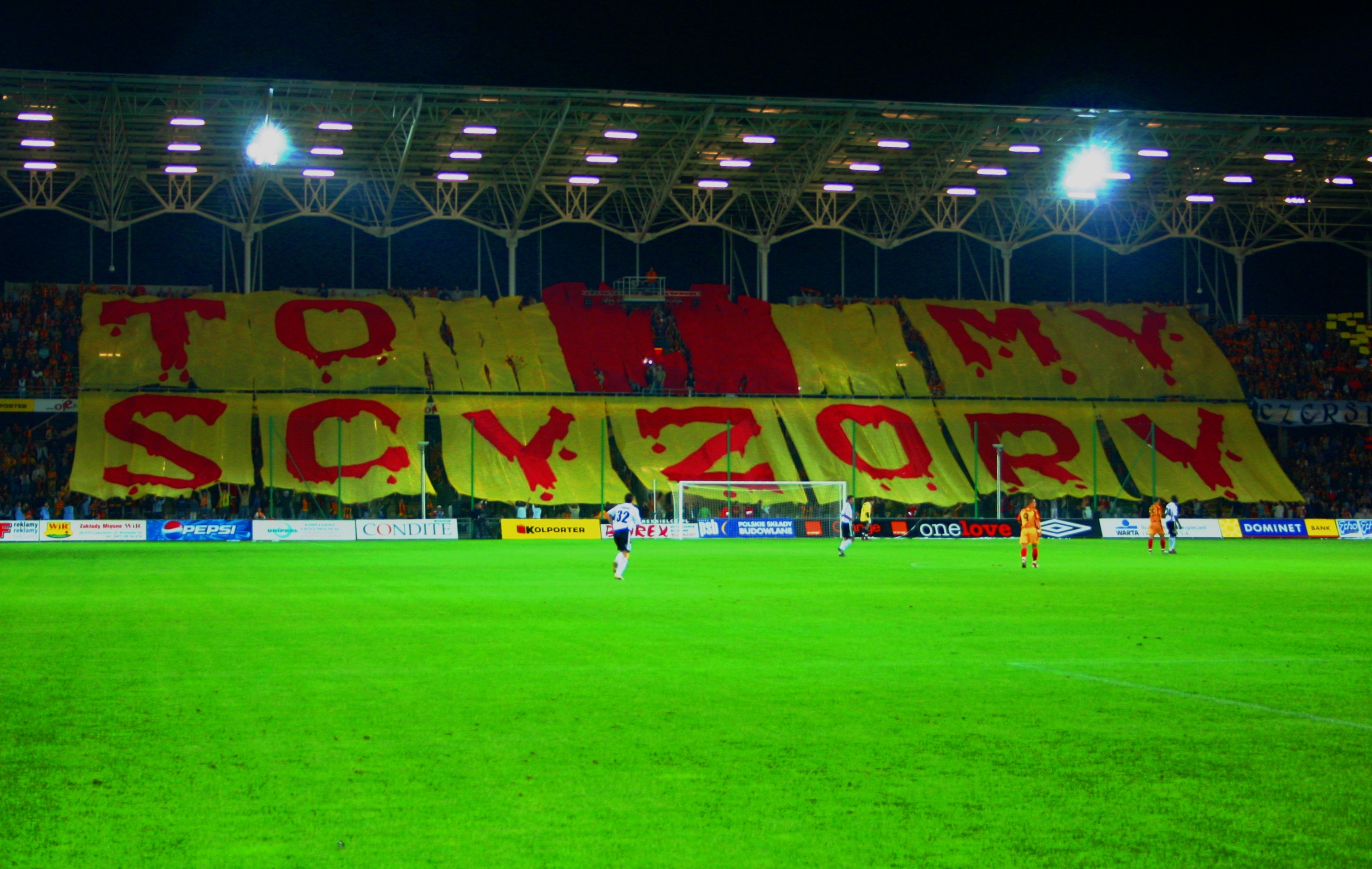
Korona Kielce–Legia Warszawa

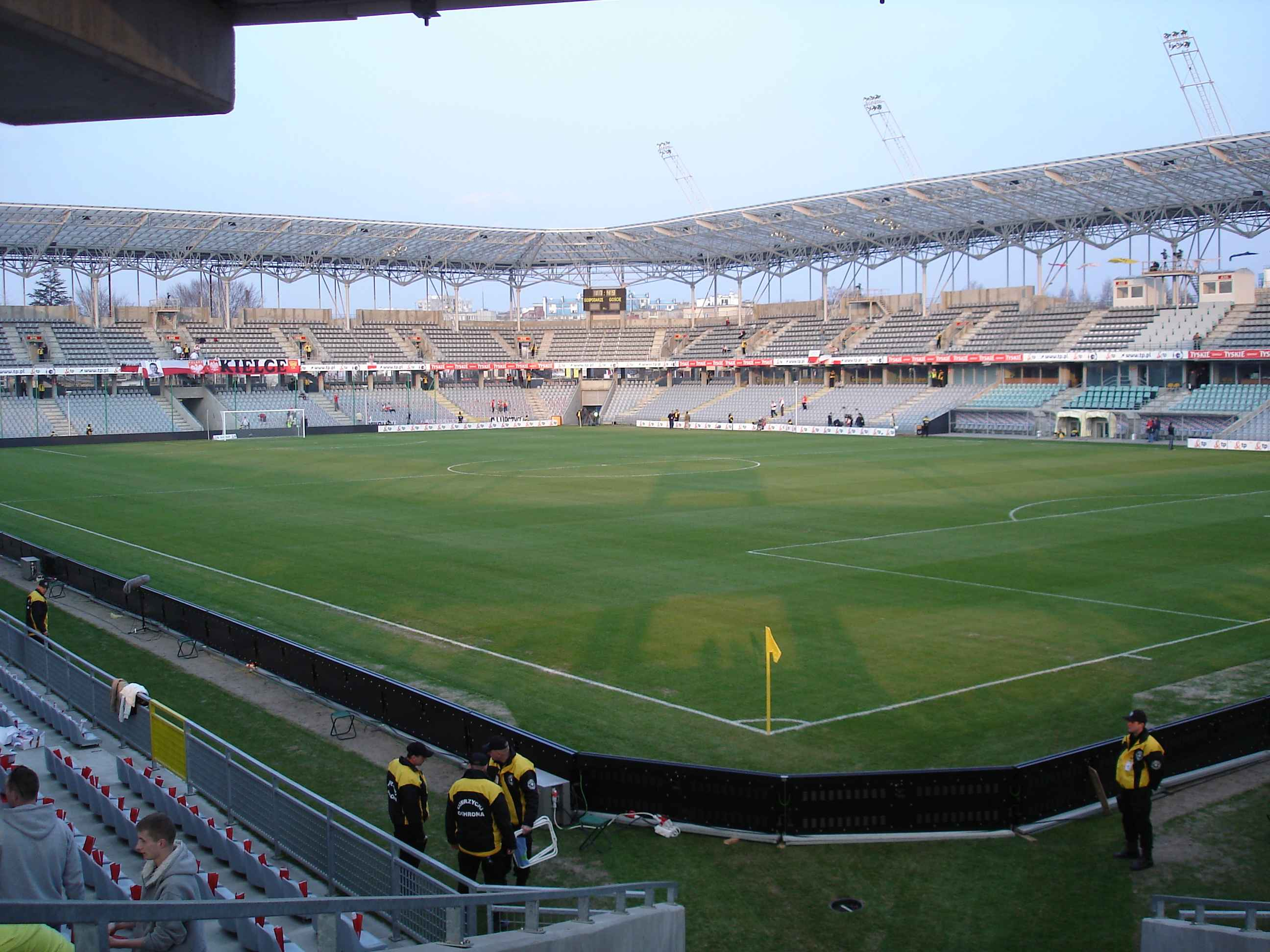
The stadium before Poland–Armenia

- Total capacity: 15 500
- Capacity on international matches: 14 525
- Sitting places: 13 823
- "Młyn": 500–1 800
- Sector for visitors: 777
- Family sector: 545
- Free admission cards: 320
- Youth teams sector: 320
- Sector for VIPs: 104
- Places for press: 54
- Club: Korona Kielce
- Illumination: 1 411 lux
- Inauguration: 01/04/2006 (Korona Kielce vs. Zagłębie Lubin 1–1)
- Record attendance: 15 500 (Korona Kielce vs. Legia Warszawa 3–1, 23/09/2006)
- Project: ATJ Architekci
- Cost: 48 million PLN
- Construction period: 22/11/2004–01/04/2006
- Address: Ściegiennego 8, Kielce
- Other: heated grass, covered

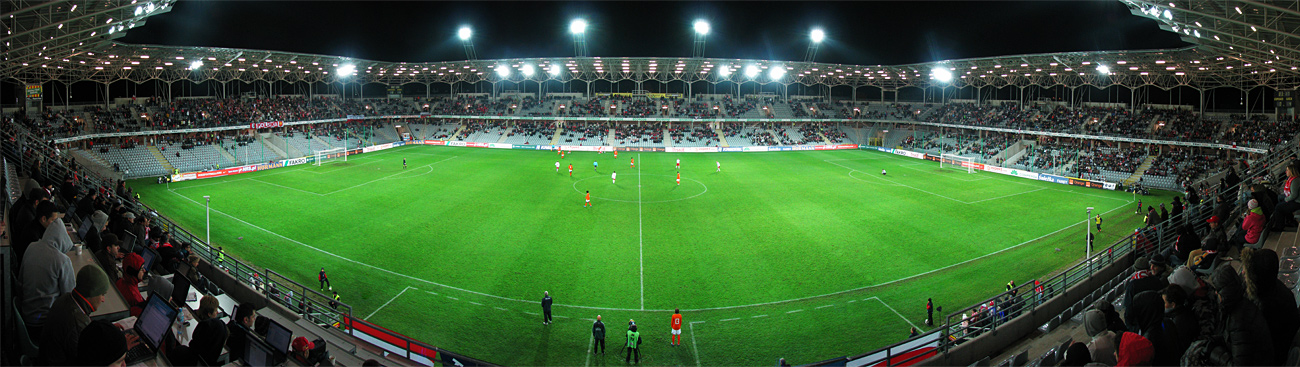
Inside The Stadium

== Matches of the Poland national team ==
So far the Poland national football team played 3 matches in the new Kielce stadium. The first was against Armenia during the qualification phase of Euro 2008. The second match was against San Marino during the qualifications for the 2010 World Cup. That game was notable for two reasons: 1) the Polish team achieved its highest victory ever, 10:0, beating its 46 years old record (a 9:0 victory against Norway in 1963). 2) Poland scored its fastest goal ever thanks to Rafał Boguski, who scored for 1-0 already in the 23rd second of the game.

A friendly match against Finland took place at the stadium on 23 May 2010.

Nr	Competition	Date	Opponent	Attendance	Result	Scorers for Poland
1	UEFA Euro 2008 qualifications	28 March 2007	Armenia	15,500	1–0 (1–0)	Maciej Żurawski
2	FIFA World Cup 2010 qualifications	1 April 2009	San Marino	15,550	10–0 (4–0)	Ebi Smolarek 3, Rafał Boguski 2, Ireneusz Jeleń, Mariusz Lewandowski, Robert Lewandowski, Marek Saganowski, Michele Marani (o.g.)
3	Friendly	29 May 2010	Finland	14,000	0–0 (0–0)	

== See also ==
- List of football stadiums in Poland
