= Michał Buchalik =

Polish footballer

Personal information
- Full name: Michał Buchalik
- Date of birth: 3 February 1989 (age 37)
- Place of birth: Rybnik, Poland
- Height: 1.90 m (6 ft 3 in)
- Position: Goalkeeper

Team information
- Current team: Radunia Stężyca
- Number: 1

Youth career
- Górnik Boguszowice
- RKP Rybnik
- Górnik Boguszowice
- 2005–2006: Energetyk ROW Rybnik

Senior career*
Years	Team	Apps	(Gls)
2006–2008	Energetyk ROW Rybnik		
2008–2011	Odra Wodzisław	29	(0)
2011–2013	Lechia Gdańsk	27	(0)
2011–2012	Lechia Gdańsk II	16	(0)
2013–2014	Ruch Chorzów	27	(0)
2013	Ruch Chorzów II	1	(0)
2014–2021	Wisła Kraków	92	(0)
2015–2016	Wisła Kraków II	10	(0)
2022–2023	Lechia Gdańsk	6	(0)
2022	Lechia Gdańsk II	3	(0)
2023–2024	Ruch Chorzów	8	(0)
2024–	Radunia Stężyca	53	(1)
- * Club domestic league appearances and goals as of 10:15, 3 July 2026 (UTC)

Michał Buchalik (born 3 February 1989) is a Polish professional footballer who played as a goalkeeper for IV liga Pomerania club Radunia Stężyca, where he also serves as a goalkeeping coach.

== Career ==
In July 2011, Buchalik joined Lechia Gdańsk on a three-year contract.

== Honours ==
Radunia Stężyca

- Regional league Gdańsk II: 2025–26
