= Maciej Jankowski =

Polish footballer (born 1990)

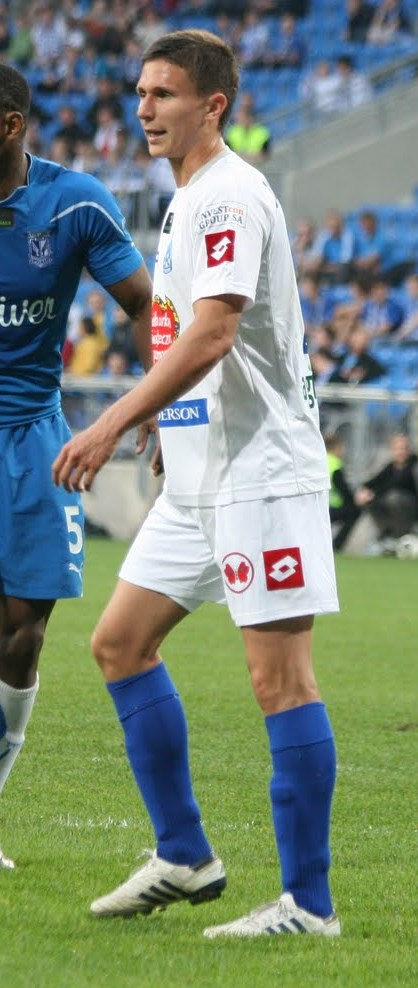
- Jankowski with Ruch Chorzów in 2011

Personal information
- Date of birth: 4 January 1990 (age 36)
- Place of birth: Warsaw, Poland
- Height: 1.81 m (5 ft 11 in)
- Position: Striker

Team information
- Current team: Ząbkovia Ząbki

Youth career
- Sarmata Warsaw
- 2003–2006: KS Piaseczno

Senior career*
Years	Team	Apps	(Gls)
2006–2010	KS Piaseczno		
2010–2014	Ruch Chorzów	111	(26)
2014–2016	Wisła Kraków	45	(7)
2016–2018	Piast Gliwice	51	(8)
2018–2020	Arka Gdynia	89	(23)
2021–2022	Stal Mielec	23	(2)
2022–2024	Wieczysta Kraków	58	(44)
2024–2026	Mazovia Mińsk Mazowiecki	41	(21)
2026–	Ząbkovia Ząbki	0	(0)

International career
2011–2012	Poland U21	2	(0)
2011	Poland	1	(0)
- * Club domestic league appearances and goals as of 21:20, 22 June 2026 (UTC)

Maciej Jankowski (born 4 January 1990) is a Polish professional footballer who plays as a striker for III liga club Ząbkovia Ząbki.

== Career ==
Jankowski started his junior career with Sarmata Warsaw, before making his first professional steps with KS Piaseczno. In summer 2010, he joined Ruch Chorzów on a three-year contract.

On 16 December 2011, Jankowski debuted for the Polish senior squad in a friendly match against Bosnia and Herzegovina.

On 13 January 2022, he signed for IV liga club Wieczysta Kraków. He was released by Wieczysta at the end of the 2023–24 season.

On 7 July 2024, Jankowski joined IV liga Masovia outfit Mazovia Mińsk Mazowiecki.

== Career statistics ==
=== Club ===
As of match played 21 June 2026

Appearances and goals by club, season and competition
Club	Season	League			Polish Cup		Europe		Total	
Club	Season	Division	Apps	Goals	Apps	Goals	Apps	Goals	Apps	Goals
KS Piaseczno	2009–10	III liga, gr. A	29	10	—		—		29	10
Ruch Chorzów	2010–11	Ekstraklasa	28	8	4	2	1 (Note: Appearance(s) in UEFA Europa League)	0	33	10
Ruch Chorzów	2011–12	Ekstraklasa	29	8	4	0	—		33	8
Ruch Chorzów	2012–13	Ekstraklasa	28	6	6	1	4	0	38	7
Ruch Chorzów	2013–14	Ekstraklasa	26	4	1	0	—		27	4
Ruch Chorzów	Total		111	26	15	3	5	0	131	29
Wisła Kraków	2014–15	Ekstraklasa	26	3	0	0	—		26	3
Wisła Kraków	2015–16	Ekstraklasa	19	4	1	1	—		20	5
Wisła Kraków	Total		45	7	1	1	—		46	8
Piast Gliwice	2015–16	Ekstraklasa	6	0	0	0	—		6	0
Piast Gliwice	2016–17	Ekstraklasa	26	7	1	0	2	0	29	7
Piast Gliwice	2017–18	Ekstraklasa	19	1	2	1	—		21	2
Piast Gliwice	Total		51	8	3	1	2	0	56	9
Arka Gdynia	2017–18	Ekstraklasa	10	2	3	0	—		13	2
Arka Gdynia	2018–19	Ekstraklasa	32	10	1	0	—		33	10
Arka Gdynia	2019–20	Ekstraklasa	30	8	0	0	—		30	8
Arka Gdynia	2020–21	I liga	17	3	2	1	—		19	4
Arka Gdynia	Total		89	23	6	1	—		95	24
Stal Mielec	2020–21	Ekstraklasa	11	2	—		—		11	2
Stal Mielec	2021–22	Ekstraklasa	12	0	1	0	—		13	0
Stal Mielec	Total		23	2	1	0	—		24	2
Wieczysta Kraków	2021–22	IV liga Les. Pol.	17	24	—		—		17	24
Wieczysta Kraków	2022–23	III liga, gr. IV	15	7	0	0	—		15	7
Wieczysta Kraków	2023–24	III liga, gr. IV	26	13	0	0	—		26	13
Wieczysta Kraków	Total		58	44	0	0	—		58	44
Mazovia Mińsk Mazowiecki	2024–25	IV liga Masovia	26	14	—		—		26	14
Mazovia Mińsk Mazowiecki	2025–26	IV liga Masovia	15	7	—		—		15	7
Mazovia Mińsk Mazowiecki	Total		41	21	—		—		41	21
Ząbkovia Ząbki	2026–27	III liga, gr. I	0	0	—		—		0	0
Career total			447	141	26	6	7	0	480	147

=== International ===
Appearances and goals by national team and year
National team	Year	Apps	Goals
Poland
Poland	2011	1	0
Total		1	0

== Honours ==
Wieczysta Kraków

- III liga, group IV: 2023–24
- IV liga Lesser Poland West: 2021–22
- Polish Cup (Lesser Poland regionals): 2021–22, 2022–23

Mazovia Mińsk Mazowiecki

- Polish Cup (Siedlce regionals): 2024–25

Individual

- Polish Newcomer of the Year: 2010
