= 2013–14 Wisła Kraków season =

Wisła Kraków
2013–14 season
- Chairman: Jacek Bednarz
- Manager: Franciszek Smuda
- Ekstraklasa: 5th
- Polish Cup: Round of 16
- Top goalscorer: League: Paweł Brożek (17); All: Paweł Brożek (18)
- Highest home attendance: 32,458 (6 October vs Legia Warsaw, Ekstraklasa)
- Lowest home attendance: 4,198 (3 May vs Pogoń Szczecin, Ekstraklasa)
- Average home league attendance: 12,267
Home colours	Away colours	Third colours

The 2013–14 season was the 74th season of Wisła Kraków in Ekstraklasa.

== Squad ==
Note: Flags indicate national team as defined under FIFA eligibility rules; some limited exceptions apply. Players may hold more than one non-FIFA nationality.

No.	Pos.	Nation	Player
1	GK	(Poland) POL	Michał Miśkiewicz
3	DF	(Bosnia and Herzegovina) BIH	Gordan Bunoza
4	DF	(Honduras) HON	Osman Chávez
5	DF	(Poland) POL	Dariusz Dudka
6	DF	(Poland) POL	Arkadiusz Głowacki (captain)
8	DF	(Poland) POL	Piotr Brożek
9	MF	(Poland) POL	Rafał Boguski
10	MF	(Poland) POL	Łukasz Garguła
11	FW	(Poland) POL	Paweł Brożek
13	DF	(Serbia) SRB	Marko Jovanović
14	DF	(Poland) POL	Patryk Fryc
15	MF	(Nigeria) NGA	Emmanuel Sarki
17	MF	(North Macedonia) MKD	Ostoja Stjepanović
18	MF	(Bosnia and Herzegovina) BIH	Semir Štilić
19	MF	(Poland) POL	Patryk Małecki
20	MF	(Poland) POL	Michał Chrapek
21	DF	(Poland) POL	Łukasz Burliga

No.	Pos.	Nation	Player
23	MF	(Germany) GER	Fabian Burdenski
25	DF	(Poland) POL	Paweł Stolarski
27	MF	(Poland) POL	Michał Nalepa
28	MF	(Poland) POL	Cezary Wilk
29	FW	(Poland) POL	Tomasz Zając
30	GK	(Poland) POL	Gerard Bieszczad
31	MF	(Poland) POL	Dominik Kościelniak
32	MF	(Poland) POL	Przemysław Lech
33	DF	(Poland) POL	Michał Czekaj
34	DF	(Poland) POL	Alan Uryga
36	GK	(Poland) POL	Jan Kocoń
42	FW	(Poland) POL	Michał Szewczyk
43	DF	(Poland) POL	Piotr Żemło
44	DF	(Poland) POL	Jakub Bartosz
54	FW	(Poland) POL	Dawid Kamiński
77	MF	(Haiti) HAI	Wilde-Donald Guerrier
99	FW	(Croatia) CRO	Danijel Klarić

== Transfers ==
=== Summer transfer window ===
==== Arrivals ====
- The following players moved to Wisła.

	Name	Position	Transfer type	Previous club	Fee
	Return from loan spell				
Substituted in	(Poland) Michał Nalepa	Defender	30 June 2013	(Poland) Termalica Bruk-Bet Nieciecza	-
	Free Transfer				
Substituted in	(Germany) Fabian Burdenski	Midfielder	13 July 2013	(Germany) 1. FC Magdeburg	-
Substituted in	(North Macedonia) Ostoja Stjepanović	Midfielder	17 July 2013	(North Macedonia) FK Vardar	-
Substituted in	(Poland) Dominik Kościelniak	Midfielder	18 July 2013	(Poland) Wisła II Kraków	-
Substituted in	(Poland) Przemysław Lech	Midfielder	18 July 2013	(Poland) Wisła II Kraków	-
Substituted in	(Poland) Paweł Brożek	Forward	30 July 2013	(Spain) Recreativo de Huelva	-
Substituted in	(Poland) Patryk Fryc	Defender	14 August 2013	(Poland) Flota Świnoujście	-
Substituted in	(Haiti) Wilde Donald Guerrier	Midfielder	27 August 2013	(Haiti) América des Cayes	-
Substituted in	(Poland) Piotr Brożek	Defender	28 October 2013	(Poland) Lechia Gdańsk	-

==== Departures ====
- The following players moved from Wisła.

	Name	Position	Transfer type	New club	Fee
	Out on loan				
Substituted off	(Poland) Damian Buras	Midfielder	23 July 2013	(Poland) Okocimski KS Brzesko	-
Substituted off	(Poland) Michał Szewczyk	Forward	30 August 2013	(Poland) Okocimski KS Brzesko	-
	Free Transfer				
Substituted off	(Bulgaria) Tzvetan Genkov	Forward	1 July 2013	(Bulgaria) Levski Sofia	-
Substituted off	(Poland) Radosław Sobolewski	Midfielder	2 July 2013	(Poland) Górnik Zabrze	-
Substituted off	(Poland) Daniel Brud	Midfielder	12 July 2013	(Poland) Okocimski KS Brzesko	-
Substituted off	(Poland) Cezary Wilk	Midfielder	6 August 2013	(Spain) Deportivo de La Coruna	-
Substituted off	(Netherlands) Kew Jaliens	Defender	15 August 2013	(Australia) Newcastle United Jets	-
Substituted off	(Estonia) Sergei Pareiko	Goalkeeper	2 September 2013	(Russia) FC Volga Nizhny Novgorod	-
Substituted off	(Austria) Daniel Sikorski	Forward	24 September 2013	(Switzerland) FC St. Gallen	-
	End of career				
Substituted off	(Serbia) Ivica Iliev	Forward	1 July 2013	-	-
Substituted off	(Poland) Kamil Kosowski	Midfielder	1 July 2013	-	-

=== Winter transfer window ===
==== Arrivals ====
- The following players moved to Wisła.

	Name	Position	Transfer type	Previous club	Fee
	Loan return				
Substituted in	(Poland) Damian Buras	Midfielder	31 December 2013	(Poland) Okocimski KS Brzesko	-
Substituted in	(Poland) Michał Szewczyk	Midfielder	31 December 2013	(Poland) Okocimski KS Brzesko	-
	Free Transfer				
Substituted in	(Bosnia and Herzegovina) Semir Štilić	Midfielder	23 January 2014	(Turkey) Gaziantepspor	-
Substituted in	(Croatia) Danijel Klarić	Forward	10 February 2014	(Austria) FC Admira Wacker Mödling	-
Substituted in	(Poland) Dariusz Dudka	Defender	17 February 2014	(England) Birmingham City FC	-
Substituted in	(Poland) Jakub Bartosz	Defender	7 March 2014	(Poland) Wisła II Kraków	-
Substituted in	(Poland) Tomasz Zając	Forward	24 April 2014	(Poland) Wisła II Kraków	-

==== Departures ====
- The following players moved from Wisła.

	Name	Position	Transfer type	New club	Fee
	Out on loan				
Substituted off	(Poland) Damian Buras	Midfielder	28 February 2014	(Poland) Siarka Tarnobrzeg	-
Substituted off	(Poland) Patryk Fryc	Defender	28 February 2014	(Poland) Termalica Bruk-Bet Nieciecza	-
Substituted off	(Honduras) Osman Chávez	Defender	28 February 2014	(China) Qingdao Jonoon	-
	Transfer				
Substituted off	(Poland) Patryk Małecki	Midfielder	3 January 2014	(Poland) Pogoń Szczecin	€150,000
Substituted off	(Poland) Paweł Stolarski	Defender	28 January 2014	(Poland) Lechia Gdańsk	€150,000
	Free Transfer				
Substituted off	(Poland) Dominik Kościelniak	Midfielder	31 December 2013	(Poland) Wisła II Kraków	-
Substituted off	(Poland) Przemysław Lech	Midfielder	31 December 2013	(Poland) Wisła II Kraków	-

== Competitions ==
=== Friendlies ===
23 June 2013	Nielba Wągrowiec (Poland)	3–4	(Poland) Wisła Kraków	Wągrowiec, Poland
17:00 CEST (UTC+2)	Goliński 52'; Nowak 63'; Gregorek 76'		Księżniakiewicz 15' (o.g.); Ignasiński 25' (o.g.); Boguski 37'; Małecki 43'	Stadium: Stadion im. Stanisława Bąka; Attendance: 2,600; Referee: Artur Kurek

27 June 2013	Zawisza Bydgoszcz (Poland)	1–1	(Poland) Wisła Kraków	Grodzisk Wielkopolski, Poland
12:15 CEST (UTC+2)	Wójcicki 26'		Boguski 53'	Stadium: Stadion Dyskobolia; Attendance: 20

30 June 2013	Wisła Kraków (Poland)	3–0	(Cyprus) AC Omonia	Opalenica, Poland
17:00 CEST (UTC+2)	Małecki 11'; Sarki 18'; Celin 62'			Stadium: Hotel Remes Sport & Spa; Referee: Piotr Idzik

3 July 2013	Lech Poznań (Poland)	3–1	(Poland) Wisła Kraków	Grodzisk Wielkopolski, Poland
16:50 CEST (UTC+2)	Hämäläinen 69'; Formella 72', 77'		Boguski 53' (pen.)	Stadium: Stadion Dyskobolia; Referee: Szymon Lizak

6 July 2013	GKS Katowice (Poland)	1–1	(Poland) Wisła Kraków	Katowice, Poland
18:20 CEST (UTC+2)	Wołkowicz 22'		Wilk 48'	Stadium: Stadion GKS Katowice

10 July 2013	Limanovia Limanowa (Poland)	2–1	(Poland) Wisła Kraków	Limanowa, Poland
18:00 CEST (UTC+2)	Komorek 43'; Piwowarczyk 82'		Celin 17'	Stadium: Stadion im. Romana Szumilasa; Attendance: 600; Referee: Agnieszka Olesiak

13 July 2013	Wisła Kraków (Poland)	0–2	(Poland) Ruch Chorzów	Kraków, Poland
18:00 CEST (UTC+2)			Malinowski 17'; Kuświk 90'	Stadium: Stadion im. Henryka Reymana; Attendance: 3,000; Referee: Tomasz Musiał

16 July 2013	Hertha BSC (Germany)	2–0	(Poland) Wisła Kraków	Berlin, Germany
17:00 CEST (UTC+2)	Schulz 2'; Langkamp 12'			Stadium: Amateurstadion

11 August 2013	Stal Mielec (Poland)	1–1	(Poland) Wisła Kraków	Mielec, Poland
18:00 CEST (UTC+2)	Łętocha 22'		Sarki 42'	Attendance: 1,000

7 September 2013	MKS Kalwarianka (Poland)	1–8	(Poland) Wisła Kraków	Kalwaria Zebrzydowska, Poland
16:00 CEST (UTC+2)	Cygal 81'		Sarki 17', 87'; Boguski 47', 51' (pen.); Małecki 52', 57'; Kamiński 74', 84'	Stadium: Ośrodek Sportu Kalwarianka; Attendance: 2,000; Referee: Sebastian Widlarz

13 October 2013	Wisła Kraków (Poland)	2–1	(Germany) VfL Wolfsburg	Kraków, Poland
15:30 CEST (UTC+2)	Guerrier 46'; Sarki 74'		Medojević 62'	Stadium: Stadion im. Henryka Reymana; Attendance: 5,398; Referee: Tomasz Musiał

15 November 2013	AS Trenčín (Slovakia)	5–0	(Poland) Wisła Kraków	Poprad, Slovakia
14:00 CET (UTC+1)	Mišák 19'; Hajradinović 22' van Kessel 43'; Bezák 60'; Ramón 64'		Małecki (penalty missed) 67'; Guerrier (yellow card) 73'	Stadium: Národné Tréningové Centrum; Referee: Miroslav Jaška

19 January 2014	Eintracht Frankfurt (Germany)	2–0	(Poland) Wisła Kraków	Frankfurt, Germany
15:00 CET (UTC+1)	Meier 15', 34' (pen.)			Stadium: Commerzbank-Arena

20 January 2014	Chrobry Głogów (Poland)	1–2	(Poland) Wisła Kraków	Grodzisk Wielkopolski, Poland
16:00 CET (UTC+1)	Sędziak 12'		Klarić (penalty missed) 35'; Burdenski 45'; Sarki 84'	Stadium: Stadion Dyskobolia

23 January 2014	Flota Świnoujście (Poland)	1–1	(Poland) Wisła Kraków	Grodzisk Wielkopolski, Poland
13:00 CET (UTC+1)	Stasiak 83'		Pa. Brożek 16' (pen.)	Stadium: Stadion Dyskobolia

25 January 2014	Chojniczanka Chojnice (Poland)	3–1	(Poland) Wisła Kraków	Grodzisk Wielkopolski, Poland
13:00 CET (UTC+1)	Rybski 56' (pen.), 77'; Mikołajczak 90'		Sarki 88'	Stadium: Boczne Boisko Dyskobolii

29 January 2014	FSV Frankfurt (Germany)	3–1	(Poland) Wisła Kraków	Belek, Turkey
14:00 CET (UTC+1)	Epstein 3' (pen.); Kauko 10'; Schlicke (red card) 42'; Wooten 84'		Garguła (penalty missed) 42'; Guerrier 42'

30 January 2014	Yonsei University FC (South Korea)	0–0	(Poland) Wisła Kraków	Kadriye, Turkey
15:30 CET (UTC+1)				Stadium: Papillon Sports Center; Referee: Tomasz Wajda

31 January 2014	FC Vaslui (Romania)	0–0	(Poland) Wisła Kraków	Kadriye, Turkey
15:30 CET (UTC+1)				Stadium: Papillon Sports Center

1 February 2014	FC Zhetysu (Kazakhstan)	2–2	(Poland) Wisła Kraków	Kadriye, Turkey
16:00 CET (UTC+1)	Tatishev 60' (pen.), 65'		Szewczyk 33'; Lucas Guedes 77'	Stadium: Papillon Sports Center

2 February 2014	FC Chornomorets Odesa (Ukraine)	2–0	(Poland) Wisła Kraków	Kadriye, Turkey
16:00 CET (UTC+1)	Antonov 52' (yellow card) 53' (yellow-red card) 84'; Léo Matos (yellow card) 55'; Gai 61' (pen.)		Burliga (yellow card) 13'; Chrapek (yellow card) 29'; Guerrier (yellow card) 55' (yellow-red card) 84'; Głowacki (yellow card) 65'; Stjepanović (yellow card) 83'	Stadium: Papillon Sports Center

3 February 2014	SK Sigma Olomouc (Czech Republic)	6–0	(Poland) Wisła Kraków	Belek, Turkey
14:30 CET (UTC+1)	Rolinc 22'; Zahradníček 31'; Plšek 45'; Ordoš 73'; Schmidt 75', 80'

8 February 2014	Zagłębie Sosnowiec (Poland)	1–2	(Poland) Wisła Kraków	Sosnowiec, Poland
11:00 CET (UTC+1)	Jankowski 44'		Pa. Brożek 14' (penalty missed) 50'; Guerrier 31'	Stadium: Stadion Ludowy

11 February 2014	Wisła Kraków (Poland)	4–0	(Poland) Poroniec Poronin	Myślenice, Poland
12:00 CET (UTC+1)	Guerrier 10'; Burliga 12'; Chrapek 26'; Pi. Brożek 89'			Stadium: Sport Myślenice

12 March 2014	Wisła Kraków (Poland)	4–0	(Poland) Puszcza Niepołomice	Myślenice, Poland
11:00 CET (UTC+1)	Stjepanović; Pa. Brożek; Štilić; Sarki			Stadium: Sport Myślenice

17 April 2014	Reprezentacja Podhala (Poland)	0–3	(Poland) Wisła Kraków	Ostrowsko, Poland
15:30 CEST (UTC+2)			Uryga 8'; Sarki 49'; Štilić 86'	Stadium: Stadion Dunajca Ostrowsko

=== Ekstraklasa ===
==== Regular season ====
===== Results summary =====
Overall								Home						Away					
Pld	W	D	L	GF	GA	GD	Pts	W	D	L	GF	GA	GD	W	D	L	GF	GA	GD
30	12	9	9	38	30	+8	45	10	2	3	23	6	+17	2	7	6	15	24	−9

Last updated: 12 April 2014.
Source: 90minut

===== Results by round =====
Round	1	2	3	4	5	6	7	8	9	10	11	12	13	14	15	16	17	18	19	20	21	22	23	24	25	26	27	28	29	30
Ground	H	A	A	H	H	A	H	A	H	A	H	A	H	H	A	A	H	H	A	A	H	A	H	A	H	A	H	A	A	H
Result	D	W	D	D	W	D	W	D	W	D	W	L	W	W	D	L	W	W	L	L	W	W	W	D	L	D	L	L	L	L
Position	11	4	7	7	4	4	3	4	2	4	3	3	3	3	2	3	3	3	3	3	3	2	2	2	3	2	3	3	4	5

Updated to match(es) played on 1 June 2014. Source: 90minut
A = Away; H = Home; W = Win; D = Draw; L = Loss

===== Matches =====
19 July 2013 1	Wisła Kraków	0–0	Górnik Zabrze	Kraków
20:30 CEST (UTC+2)	Głowacki (yellow card) 47'			Stadium: Stadion im. Henryka Reymana; Attendance: 13,244; Referee: Krzysztof Jakubik

29 July 2013 2	Korona Kielce	2–3	Wisła Kraków	Kielce
18:00 CEST (UTC+2)	Golański 33'; Sobolewski 80'		Stjepanović (yellow card) 12'; Garguła 35', 58'; Nalepa (yellow card) 44'; Chrapek 90' (pen.)	Stadium: Kielce City Stadium; Attendance: 8,971; Referee: Daniel Stefański

4 August 2013 3	Śląsk Wrocław	0–0	Wisła Kraków	Wrocław
18:00 CEST (UTC+2)	Socha (yellow card) 19'; Ostrowski (yellow card) 90'; Hołota (yellow card) 90'		Stjepanović (yellow card) 37'; Burliga (yellow card) 71'; Bunoza (yellow card) 72'; Chrapek (yellow card) 84'	Stadium: Stadion Miejski; Attendance: 13,422; Referee: Szymon Marciniak

9 August 2013 4	Wisła Kraków	1–1	Jagiellonia Białystok	Kraków
20:30 CEST (UTC+2)	Bunoza (yellow card) 30'; Chrapek (yellow card) 33'; Nalepa (yellow card) 56'; Małecki 78'; Chávez (yellow card) 90'		Piątkowski (yellow card) 30'; Baran (yellow card) 44'; Grzyb (yellow card) 59'; Quintana (yellow card) 83'; Pazdan (yellow card) 89'; Balaj 90'	Stadium: Stadion im. Henryka Reymana; Attendance: 12,310; Referee: Paweł Pskit

25 August 2013 5	Wisła Kraków	2–0	Lech Poznań	Kraków
18:00 CEST (UTC+2)	Pa. Brożek 30' (pen.); Burliga (yellow card) 32'; Garguła 45'; Stjepanović (yellow card) 75'		Możdżeń (yellow card) 87'; Ślusarski (yellow card) 90'; Trałka (yellow card) 90'	Stadium: Stadion im. Henryka Reymana; Attendance: 18,458; Referee: Szymon Marciniak

31 August 2013 6	Pogoń Szczecin	0–0	Wisła Kraków	Szczecin
18:00 CEST (UTC+2)	Ława (yellow card) 28'		Bunoza (yellow card) 40'; Nalepa (yellow card) 45'	Stadium: Stadion Miejski im. Floriana Krygiera; Attendance: 6,780; Referee: Daniel Stefański

13 September 2013 7	Wisła Kraków	3–0	Piast Gliwice	Kraków
20:30 CEST (UTC+2)	Pa. Brożek 33', 62'; Burliga (yellow card) 54'; Guerrier 82'; Stolarski (yellow card) 90'		Król (yellow card) 38'	Stadium: Stadion im. Henryka Reymana; Attendance: 13,858; Referee: Paweł Gil

21 September 2013 8	Cracovia	1–1	Wisła Kraków	Kraków
18:00 CEST (UTC+2)	Żytko (yellow card) 49'; Nowak 75'		Chrapek 31' (yellow card) 58'; Bunoza (yellow card) 87'; Stjepanović (yellow card) 89'	Stadium: Józef Piłsudski Stadium; Attendance: 14,125; Referee: Szymon Marciniak

24 September 2013 9	Wisła Kraków	3–0	Lechia Gdańsk	Kraków
20:30 CEST (UTC+2)	Chrapek 70' (yellow card) 73'; Pa. Brożek 76', 90'		Dawidowicz (yellow card) 44'; Frankowski (red card) 57'; Buzała (yellow card) 65'	Stadium: Stadion im. Henryka Reymana; Attendance: 11,189; Referee: Paweł Pskit

28 September 2013 10	Ruch Chorzów	1–1	Wisła Kraków	Chorzów
18:00 CEST (UTC+2)	Janoszka (yellow card) 49'; Starzyński 57'		Sarki (yellow card) 17'; Głowacki 28'; Nalepa (yellow card) 57'	Stadium: Stadion Miejski; Attendance: 5,000; Referee: Krzysztof Jakubik

6 October 2013 11	Wisła Kraków	1–0	Legia Warsaw	Kraków
15:30 CEST (UTC+2)	Pa. Brożek 82'; Burliga (yellow card) 89'		Żyro (yellow card) 8'; Broź (yellow card) 90'	Stadium: Stadion im. Henryka Reymana; Attendance: 32,458; Referee: Szymon Marciniak

19 October 2013 12	Zawisza Bydgoszcz	3–1	Wisła Kraków	Bydgoszcz
15:30 CEST (UTC+2)	Ziajka (yellow card) 15'; Goulon 59'; Masłowski (yellow card) 62' (yellow-red card) 90' (goal) 68'; Luís Carlos 87'; Drygas (yellow card) 90'		Bunoza (yellow card) 3' (yellow-red card) 58'; Garguła 38'; Małecki (yellow card) 78'	Stadium: Stadion im. Zdzisława Krzyszkowiaka; Attendance: 6,500; Referee: Paweł Raczkowski

26 October 2013 13	Wisła Kraków	1–0	Zagłębie Lubin	Kraków
20:30 CEST (UTC+2)	Garguła 39'; Chrapek (yellow card) 56'; Guerrier (yellow card) 68'; Burliga (yellow card) 75'		Jež (yellow card) 82'	Stadium: Stadion im. Henryka Reymana; Attendance: 10,753; Referee: Jarosław Rynkiewicz

29 October 2013 14	Wisła Kraków	3–0	Widzew Łódź	Kraków
20:30 CET (UTC+1)	Guerrier 11', 85'; Pa. Brożek 25'; Burliga (yellow card) 45'; Bunoza (yellow card) 51'; Małecki (yellow card) 73'; Stjepanović (yellow card) 90'; Pi. Brożek (yellow card) 90'		Lafrance (yellow card) 13'; E. Višņakovs (yellow card) 31'; Pérez (red card) 42'	Stadium: Stadion im. Henryka Reymana; Attendance: 10,473; Referee: Paweł Gil

4 November 2013 15	Podbeskidzie Bielsko-Biała	0–0	Wisła Kraków	Bielsko-Biała
20:30 CET (UTC+1)	Łatka (yellow card) 50'		Chrapek (yellow card) 35'	Stadium: Stadion Miejski; Attendance: 3,200; Referee: Krzysztof Jakubik

8 November 2013 16	Górnik Zabrze	3–2	Wisła Kraków	Zabrze
20:30 CET (UTC+1)	Nakoulma 55'; Łukasiewicz (yellow card) 59'; Zachara 71', 77'		Šteinbors 30' (o.g.); Guerrier 50'; Pi. Brożek (yellow card) 76'; Burliga (yellow card) 80'; Sarki (yellow card) 82'	Stadium: Stadion im. Ernesta Pohla; Attendance: 3,000; Referee: Tomasz Radkiewicz

22 November 2013 17	Wisła Kraków	1–0	Korona Kielce	Kraków
20:30 CET (UTC+1)	Burliga (yellow card) 38'; Guerrier (yellow card) 63'; Pa. Brożek 86'		Sobolewski (yellow card) 39'; Małkowski (yellow card) 49'; Dejmek (yellow card) 60'	Stadium: Stadion im. Henryka Reymana; Attendance: 12,499; Referee: Bartosz Frankowski

29 November 2013 18	Wisła Kraków	3–0	Śląsk Wrocław	Kraków
20:30 CET (UTC+1)	Garguła 17'; Guerrier (yellow card) 36'; Boguski 52'; Pa. Brożek 54'		Kaźmierczak (yellow card) 55'; Pawelec (yellow card) 64'	Stadium: Stadion im. Henryka Reymana; Attendance: 15,195; Referee: Daniel Stefański

2 December 2013 19	Jagiellonia Białystok	5–2	Wisła Kraków	Białystok
18:00 CET (UTC+1)	Grzyb 3'; Piątkowski 14', 70'; Plizga 54'; Dźwigała 88'		Stjepanović (yellow card) 11'; Głowacki (yellow card) 34' (goal) 74'; Pa. Brożek 38'; Jovanović (yellow card) 84'; Małecki (yellow card) 85'	Stadium: Stadion Miejski; Attendance: 3,376; Referee: Krzysztof Jakubik

6 December 2013 20	Lech Poznań	2–0	Wisła Kraków	Poznań
20:30 CET (UTC+1)	Douglas (yellow card) 10'; Trałka (yellow card) 45'; Henríquez 56'; Ślusarski (yellow card) 73'; Lovrencsics 82'; Możdżeń (yellow card) 85'		Garguła (yellow card) 28'; Bunoza (yellow card) 40'; Burliga (yellow card) 51'	Stadium: INEA Stadion; Attendance: 10,432; Referee: Paweł Gil

16 December 2013 21	Wisła Kraków	2–1	Pogoń Szczecin	Kraków
18:15 CET (UTC+1)	Pa. Brożek 19'; Stjepanović (yellow card) 35'; Burliga 54' (yellow card) 61'; Garguła (yellow card) 90'; Głowacki (yellow card) 90'		Akahoshi (yellow card) 59'; Robak 70' (pen.); Dąbrowski (yellow card) 89'; Golla (yellow card) 90'	Stadium: Stadion im. Henryka Reymana; Attendance: 10,854; Referee: Sebastian Jarzębak

17 February 2014 22	Piast Gliwice	0–1	Wisła Kraków	Gliwice
18:00 CET (UTC+1)	Nikiema (yellow card) 22'		Burliga (yellow card) 24'; Garguła 59' (pen.)	Stadium: Stadion Piasta; Attendance: 6,228; Referee: Marcin Borski

23 February 2014 23	Wisła Kraków	3–1	Cracovia	Kraków
15:30 CET (UTC+1)	Głowacki 33'; Štilić 39'; Burliga (yellow card) 53'; Pi. Brożek (yellow card) 85'; Garguła 87'		Ntibazonkiza 76'; Dąbrowski (yellow card) 81'	Stadium: Stadion im. Henryka Reymana; Attendance: 28,476; Referee: Szymon Marciniak

28 February 2014 24	Lechia Gdańsk	0–0	Wisła Kraków	Gdańsk
20:30 CET (UTC+1)			Głowacki (yellow card) 63'; Bunoza (yellow card) 70'	Stadium: PGE Arena; Attendance: 11,291; Referee: Paweł Pskit

8 March 2014 25	Wisła Kraków	0–1	Ruch Chorzów	Kraków
18:30 CET (UTC+1)	Dudka (yellow card) 26'; Pi. Brożek (yellow card) 48'; Bunoza (yellow card) 87'		Kuświk 52'; Stawarczyk (yellow card) 78'; Malinowski (yellow card) 86'	Stadium: Stadion im. Henryka Reymana; Attendance: 10,288; Referee: Paweł Raczkowski

16 March 2014 26	Legia Warsaw	2–2	Wisła Kraków	Warsaw
13:00 CET (UTC+1)	Radović 2'; Duda 36'; D. Júnior (yellow card) 65'		Dudka (yellow card) 25'; Głowacki (red card) 27'; Burliga (yellow card) 40'; Guerrier 66'; Štilić 82'	Stadium: Pepsi Arena; Attendance: 0 Referee: Szymon Marciniak

21 March 2014 27	Wisła Kraków	0–1	Zawisza Bydgoszcz	Kraków
20:30 CET (UTC+1)	Pi. Brożek (yellow card) 80'; Szewczyk (yellow card) 90+2'		Drygas (yellow card) 48'; Kadú 67'; Gevorgyan (yellow card) 90+2'	Stadium: Stadion im. Henryka Reymana; Attendance: 7,410; Referee: Marcin Borski

31 March 2014 28	Zagłębie Lubin	3–1	Wisła Kraków	Lubin
18:00 CEST (UTC+2)	Curto 86'; Piech 90+1'; Nalepa 90+3' (o.g.)		Nalepa (yellow card) 64'; Burliga 73'; Bunoza (yellow card) 86'; Burdenski (yellow card) 88'	Stadium: Stadion Zagłębia; Attendance: 4,776; Referee: Tomasz Kwiatkowski

5 April 2014 29	Widzew Łódź	2–1	Wisła Kraków	Łódź
18:00 CEST (UTC+2)	Rybicki 6'; Cetnarski 66'; Kasprzak (yellow card) 68'; Aléx Bruno (yellow card) 84'		Nalepa (yellow card) 24'; Bunoza (yellow card) 34'; Uryga (yellow card) 41'; Garguła 57'; Stjepanović (yellow card) 71'; Guerrier (yellow card) 88'	Stadium: Stadion Widzewa; Attendance: 6,600; Referee: Bartosz Frankowski

12 April 2014 30	Wisła Kraków	0–1	Podbeskidzie Bielsko-Biała	Kraków
18:00 CEST (UTC+2)	Uryga (yellow card) 21'; Garguła (yellow card) 45' (penalty missed) 70'; Miśkiewicz (yellow card) 45+2'; Bartosz (yellow card) 55'; Dudka (yellow card) 90+2' (yellow-red card) 90+2'		Miśkiewicz 1' (o.g.); Łatka (yellow card) 10'; Górkiewicz (yellow card) 48'; Pietruszka (yellow card) 52'; Chmiel (yellow card) 61'	Stadium: Stadion im. Henryka Reymana; Attendance: 5,772; Referee: Jarosław Przybył

===== League table =====
Pos	Team	Pld	W	D	L	GF	GA	GD	Pts	Qualification
3	Ruch Chorzów	30	14	8	8	40	38	+2	50	Qualification to Championship round
4	Pogoń Szczecin	30	11	14	5	47	38	+9	47	Qualification to Championship round
5	Wisła Kraków	30	12	9	9	38	30	+8	45	Qualification to Championship round
6	Zawisza Bydgoszcz	30	11	9	10	43	37	+6	42 (Note: ZAW 3-1 GÓR; GÓR 3-2 ZAW)	Qualification to Championship round
7	Górnik Zabrze	30	11	9	10	42	46	−4	42	Qualification to Championship round

Source: Ekstraklasa.org
Rules for classification: 1) points; 2) head-to-head points; 3) head-to-head goal difference; 4) head-to-head goals scored; 5) goal difference; 6) number of goals scored; 7) Fair Play table. Head-to-head record is used only after all the matches between the teams in question have been played

==== Championship round ====
===== Results summary =====
Overall								Home						Away					
Pld	W	D	L	GF	GA	GD	Pts	W	D	L	GF	GA	GD	W	D	L	GF	GA	GD
7	2	2	3	13	16	−3	8	2	0	1	9	4	+5	0	2	2	4	12	−8

Last updated: 1 June 2014.
Source: 90minut

===== Results by round =====
Round	1	2	3	4	5	6	7
Ground	A	H	A	A	H	A	H
Result	L	W	L	D	L	D	W
Position	5	4	4	4	6	6	5

Updated to match(es) played on 1 June 2014. Source: 90minut
A = Away; H = Home; W = Win; D = Draw; L = Loss

===== Matches =====
25 April 2014 31	Lech Poznań	3–0	Wisła Kraków	Poznań
20:30 CEST (UTC+2)	Teodorczyk 7'; Uryga 11' (o.g.); Trałka (yellow card) 69'; Hämäläinen 78'; Linetty (yellow card) 89'		Burdenski (yellow card) 44'; Guerrier (yellow card) 90+3'; Burliga (yellow card) 90+5'	Stadium: INEA Stadion; Attendance: 19,105; Referee: Paweł Raczkowski

3 May 2014 32	Wisła Kraków	5–0	Pogoń Szczecin	Kraków
20:30 CEST (UTC+2)	Pa. Brożek 6', 60', 62'; Guerrier 12'; Štilić 29'; Burliga (yellow card) 43'; Dudka (yellow card) 89'		Rudol (yellow card) 52'; Dąbrowski (yellow card) 88'	Stadium: Stadion im. Henryka Reymana; Attendance: 4,198; Referee: Paweł Gil

9 May 2014 33	Legia Warsaw	5–0	Wisła Kraków	Warsaw
20:30 CEST (UTC+2)	Żyro 20'; Kucharczyk 35'; Jodłowiec 44'; Dossa Júnior 59' (yellow card) 59'; Saganowski 79'		Nalepa (yellow card) 22'	Stadium: Pepsi Arena; Attendance: 26,403; Referee: Bartosz Frankowski

19 May 2014 34	Ruch Chorzów	2–2	Wisła Kraków	Chorzów
18:00 CEST (UTC+2)	Zieńczuk (yellow card) 25'; Starzyński 29' (pen.); Kuświk 38'; Sadlok (yellow card) 78'		Pa. Brożek 24', 45' (pen.); Štilić (yellow card) 82'	Stadium: Stadion Miejski; Attendance: 6,500; Referee: Krzysztof Jakubik

24 May 2014 35	Wisła Kraków	2–3	Górnik Zabrze	Kraków
13:00 CEST (UTC+2)	Štilić 10'; Guerrier 43'		Zachara 3'; Danch 67', 86'	Stadium: Stadion im. Henryka Reymana; Attendance: 5,371; Referee: Minoru Tōjō

28 May 2014 36	Lechia Gdańsk	2–2	Wisła Kraków	Gdańsk
20:30 CEST (UTC+2)	Sadayev (yellow card) 31'; Leković (yellow card) 42'; Vranješ 66' (pen.), 90' (pen.); Janicki (yellow card) 79'; Stolarski (yellow card) 83'		Uryga (yellow card) 14'; Štilić 19', 81' (pen.); Burdenski (yellow card) 65'; Guerrier (yellow card) 70'; Pi. Brożek (yellow card) 74'	Stadium: PGE Arena; Attendance: 12,433; Referee: Szymon Marciniak

1 June 2014 37	Wisła Kraków	2–1	Zawisza Bydgoszcz	Kraków
18:00 CEST (UTC+2)	Pa. Brożek 20'; Štilić 35'		Alvarinho 17' (yellow card) 84'; Petasz (yellow card) 21'; Hermes (yellow card) 68'; Lewczuk (yellow card) 88'; Nawotczyński (yellow card) 89'	Stadium: Stadion im. Henryka Reymana; Attendance: 4,936; Referee: Mariusz Złotek

===== League table =====
Pos	Team	Pld	W	D	L	GF	GA	GD	Pts	Qualification
3	Ruch Chorzów	37	16	11	10	47	48	−1	34	Qualification to Europa League second qualifying round
4	Lechia Gdańsk	37	13	13	11	46	41	+5	32	
5	Wisła Kraków	37	14	11	12	51	46	+5	31	
6	Górnik Zabrze	37	14	10	13	53	57	−4	31	
7	Pogoń Szczecin	37	11	17	9	50	50	0	27	

Source: Ekstraklasa.org
Rules for classification: 1) points; 2) points in regular season; 3) head-to-head points in regular season; 4) head-to-head goal difference in regular season; 5) head-to-head goals scored in regular season; 6) goal difference; 7) number of goals scored; 8) Fair Play table. Head-to-head record is used only after all the matches between the teams in question have been played

=== Polish Cup ===
16 August 2013 Round of 32	Zagłębie Sosnowiec	0–4	Wisła Kraków	Sosnowiec
18:30 CEST (UTC+2)	Jankowski (yellow card) 59'		Sarki (yellow card) 39'; Chrapek 42'; Garguła 50', 54'; Paweł Brożek 81'	Stadium: Stadion Ludowy; Attendance: 5,000; Referee: Jarosław Przybył

22 October 2013 Round of 16	Wisła Kraków	0–1	Lechia Gdańsk	Kraków
18:00 CEST (UTC+2)	Chrapek (yellow card) 34'; Guerrier (yellow card) 54'; Małecki (yellow card) 90'; Kamiński (yellow card) 90'		Buzała 74'; Zyska (yellow card) 90'	Stadium: Stadion im. Henryka Reymana; Attendance: 5,331; Referee: Bartosz Frankowski

== Squad statistics ==
As of Match played 1 June 2014

=== Appearances and goals ===
No.	Pos	Nat	Player	Total		Ekstraklasa		Polish Cup	
No.	Pos	Nat	Player	Apps	Goals	Apps	Goals	Apps	Goals
1	GK	(Poland) POL	Michał Miśkiewicz	39	0	37+0	0	2+0	0
3	DF	(Bosnia and Herzegovina) BIH	Gordan Bunoza	27	0	26+0	0	1+0	0
4	DF	(Honduras) HON	Osman Chávez	4	0	3+1	0	0+0	0
5	DF	(Poland) POL	Dariusz Dudka	12	0	11+1	0	0+0	0
6	DF	(Poland) POL	Arkadiusz Głowacki	27	3	26+0	3	1+0	0
8	DF	(Poland) POL	Piotr Brożek	22	0	16+6	0	0+0	0
9	MF	(Poland) POL	Rafał Boguski	21	1	17+4	1	0+0	0
10	MF	(Poland) POL	Łukasz Garguła	35	11	31+3	9	1+0	2
11	FW	(Poland) POL	Paweł Brożek	35	18	33+0	17	2+0	1
13	DF	(Serbia) SRB	Marko Jovanović	19	0	17+0	0	2+0	0
14	DF	(Poland) POL	Patryk Fryc	5	0	1+2	0	1+1	0
15	MF	(Nigeria) NGA	Emmanuel Sarki	37	0	19+16	0	2+0	0
17	MF	(North Macedonia) MKD	Ostoja Stjepanović	36	0	31+3	0	1+1	0
18	MF	(Bosnia and Herzegovina) BIH	Semir Štilić	16	7	16+0	7	0+0	0
19	MF	(Poland) POL	Patryk Małecki	22	1	8+12	1	2+0	0
20	MF	(Poland) POL	Michał Chrapek	35	4	32+1	3	2+0	1
21	DF	(Poland) POL	Łukasz Burliga	34	2	31+2	2	1+0	0
23	MF	(Germany) GER	Fabian Burdenski	9	0	2+6	0	0+1	0
25	DF	(Poland) POL	Paweł Stolarski	11	0	5+4	0	1+1	0
27	MF	(Poland) POL	Michał Nalepa	18	0	11+5	0	2+0	0
28	MF	(Poland) POL	Cezary Wilk	3	0	0+3	0	0+0	0
29	FW	(Poland) POL	Tomasz Zając	2	0	0+2	0	0+0	0
33	DF	(Poland) POL	Michał Czekaj	7	0	7+0	0	0+0	0
34	MF	(Poland) POL	Alan Uryga	8	0	5+3	0	0+0	0
42	MF	(Poland) POL	Michał Szewczyk	7	0	0+7	0	0+0	0
43	DF	(Poland) POL	Piotr Żemło	2	0	0+2	0	0+0	0
44	DF	(Poland) POL	Jakub Bartosz	1	0	0+1	0	0+0	0
54	FW	(Poland) POL	Dawid Kamiński	3	0	0+2	0	0+1	0
77	MF	(Haiti) HAI	Wilde Donald Guerrier	31	7	22+8	7	1+0	0
99	FW	(Croatia) CRO	Danijel Klarić	2	0	0+2	0	0+0	0

=== Top scorers ===
Place	Position	Nation	Number	Name	Ekstraklasa	Polish Cup	Total
1	FW	(Poland)	11	Paweł Brożek	17	1	18
2	MF	(Poland)	10	Łukasz Garguła	9	2	11
3	MF	(Bosnia and Herzegovina)	18	Semir Štilić	7	0	7
3	MF	(Haiti)	77	Wilde Donald Guerrier	7	0	7
5	MF	(Poland)	20	Michał Chrapek	3	1	4
6	DF	(Poland)	6	Arkadiusz Głowacki	3	0	3
7	DF	(Poland)	21	Łukasz Burliga	2	0	2
8	MF	(Poland)	9	Rafał Boguski	1	0	1
8	MF	(Poland)	19	Patryk Małecki	1	0	1
				TOTALS	50	4	54

=== Disciplinary record ===
Number	Nation	Position	Name	Ekstraklasa		Polish Cup		Total	
Number	Nation	Position	Name	Booked	Sent off (straight red)	Booked	Sent off (straight red)	Booked	Sent off (straight red)
21	(Poland)	DF	Łukasz Burliga	15	0	0	0	15	0
3	(Bosnia and Herzegovina)	DF	Gordan Bunoza	12	1	0	0	12	1
17	(North Macedonia)	MF	Ostoja Stjepanović	8	0	0	0	8	0
27	(Poland)	DF	Michał Nalepa	7	0	0	0	7	0
20	(Poland)	MF	Michał Chrapek	6	0	1	0	7	0
77	(Haiti)	MF	Wilde Donald Guerrier	6	0	1	0	7	0
8	(Poland)	DF	Piotr Brożek	6	0	0	0	6	0
5	(Poland)	DF	Dariusz Dudka	5	1	0	0	5	1
6	(Poland)	DF	Arkadiusz Głowacki	4	1	0	0	4	1
19	(Poland)	DF	Patryk Małecki	3	0	1	0	4	0
10	(Poland)	MF	Łukasz Garguła	3	0	0	0	3	0
23	(Germany)	MF	Fabian Burdenski	3	0	0	0	3	0
34	(Poland)	MF	Alan Uryga	3	0	0	0	3	0
15	(Nigeria)	MF	Emmanuel Sarki	2	0	1	0	3	0
1	(Poland)	GK	Michał Miśkiewicz	1	0	0	0	1	0
4	(Honduras)	DF	Osman Chávez	1	0	0	0	1	0
13	(Serbia)	DF	Marko Jovanović	1	0	0	0	1	0
18	(Bosnia and Herzegovina)	MF	Semir Štilić	1	0	0	0	1	0
25	(Poland)	DF	Paweł Stolarski	1	0	0	0	1	0
42	(Poland)	MF	Michał Szewczyk	1	0	0	0	1	0
44	(Poland)	DF	Jakub Bartosz	1	0	0	0	1	0
54	(Poland)	FW	Dawid Kamiński	0	0	1	0	1	0
			TOTALS	90	3	5	0	95	3
