= Burdenski =

Burdenski is a surname. Notable people with the surname include:

- Dieter Burdenski (1950–2024), German footballer, father of Fabian and son of Herbert
- Fabian Burdenski (born 1991), German footballer
- Herbert Burdenski (1922–2001), German footballer and manager
