= Dariusz Dudka =

Polish footballer (born 1983)

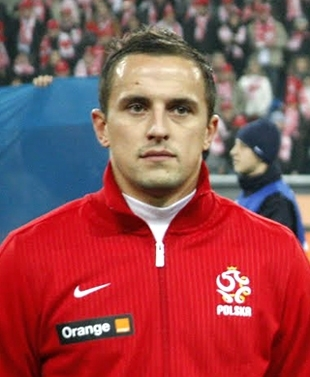
- Dudka playing for Poland

Personal information
- Full name: Dariusz Dudka
- Date of birth: 9 December 1983 (age 42)
- Place of birth: Kostrzyn nad Odrą, Poland
- Height: 1.83 m (6 ft 0 in)
- Positions: Defensive midfielder; defender

Team information
- Current team: Poland U21 (assistant)

Youth career
- Celuloza Kostrzyn

Senior career*
Years	Team	Apps	(Gls)
1999–2005	Amica Wronki	93	(0)
2005–2008	Wisła Kraków	77	(5)
2008–2012	Auxerre	110	(6)
2012–2013	Levante	3	(0)
2013	Birmingham City	2	(0)
2014–2015	Wisła Kraków	46	(0)
2014	Wisła Kraków II	1	(0)
2015–2017	Lech Poznań	9	(0)
2017–2019	Lech Poznań II	56	(10)
Total		397	(21)

International career
2004–2012	Poland	65	(2)
- * Club domestic league appearances and goals

Dariusz Dudka (Polish pronunciation: [ˈdarjuʐ ˈdutka]; born 9 December 1983) is a Polish former professional footballer. He played as a defensive midfielder or full-back and also as a centre-back. He is currently the assistant coach of the Poland U21 national team.

== Club career ==
Born in Kostrzyn nad Odrą, Dudka began his career at hometown club Celuloza Kostrzyn, before moving to Amica Wronki. He made his debut for Amica Wronki in the Ekstraklasa on 4 April 2000. In 2005, he moved to Wisła Kraków, where he made 77 league appearances. In June 2008, he joined Ligue 1 side Auxerre. After four seasons he moved to Levante on a free transfer.

After a trial, Dudka signed a two-month contract with English Championship club Birmingham City on 31 October 2013. He made two appearances, the last on 7 December, was reportedly surprised at the pace of the game in the Championship, and left the club when his contract expired.

== International career ==
Dudka represented Poland at the 2006 FIFA World Cup, Euro 2008 and Euro 2012.

== Coaching career ==
After retiring in 2019, Dudka joined Lech Poznań's academy staff. In 2020, he was appointed as assistant coach of Lech's first team, and went on to work under managers Dariusz Żuraw, Maciej Skorża, John van den Brom, Mariusz Rumak and Niels Frederiksen, focusing on set-pieces. Dudka left the club at the end of the 2024–25 season when his contract expired.

In August 2025, Dudka was appointed assistant coach of the Poland U21 national team under head coach Jerzy Brzęczek.

== Career statistics ==
=== Club ===
Appearances and goals by club, season and competition
Club	Season	League			National cup (Note: Includes Polish Cup, Coupe de France, Copa del Rey)		League cup (Note: Includes Polish League Cup, Ekstraklasa Cup, Coupe de la Ligue)		Europe		Other		Total	
Club	Season	Division	Apps	Goals	Apps	Goals	Apps	Goals	Apps	Goals	Apps	Goals	Apps	Goals
Amica Wronki	1999–2000	Ekstraklasa	2	0	0	0	0	0	—		1 (Note: Appearance in Polish Super Cup)	0	3	0
Amica Wronki	2000–01	Ekstraklasa	17	0	1	0	4	0	—		—		22	0
Amica Wronki	2001–02	Ekstraklasa	23	0	6	0	1	0	—		—		30	0
Amica Wronki	2002–03	Ekstraklasa	4	0	0	0	—		—		—		4	0
Amica Wronki	2003–04	Ekstraklasa	23	0	4	0	—		—		—		27	0
Amica Wronki	2004–05	Ekstraklasa	23	0	7	0	—		8 (Note: Appearance(s) in UEFA Cup)	0	—		38	0
Amica Wronki	2005–06	Ekstraklasa	1	0	—		—		—		—		1	0
Amica Wronki	Total		93	0	18	0	5	0	8	0	1	0	125	0
Wisła Kraków	2005–06	Ekstraklasa	29	1	4	0	—		4 (Note: Two appearances in UEFA Champions League, two appearances in UEFA Cup)	0	—		37	1
Wisła Kraków	2006–07	Ekstraklasa	28	3	2	0	2	0	7	0	—		39	3
Wisła Kraków	2007–08	Ekstraklasa	20	1	4	0	4	0	—		—		28	1
Wisła Kraków	Total		77	5	10	0	6	0	11	0	—		104	5
Auxerre	2008–09	Ligue 1	28	1	1	0	2	0	—		—		31	1
Auxerre	2009–10	Ligue 1	19	0	1	0	1	0	—		—		21	0
Auxerre	2010–11	Ligue 1	29	3	1	0	3	1	5 (Note: Appearance(s) in UEFA Champions League)	0	—		38	4
Auxerre	2011–12	Ligue 1	34	2	2	2	0	0	—		—		36	4
Auxerre	Total		110	6	5	2	6	1	5	0	—		126	9
Levante	2012–13	La Liga	3	0	1	0	—		2 (Note: Appearance(s) in UEFA Europa League)	0	—		6	0
Levante	Total		3	0	1	0	—		2	0	—		6	0
Birmingham City	2013–14	Championship	2	0	0	0	0	0	—		—		2	0
Birmingham City	Total		2	0	0	0	0	0	—		—		2	0
Wisła Kraków	2013–14	Ekstraklasa	12	0	0	0	—		—		—		12	0
Wisła Kraków	2014–15	Ekstraklasa	34	0	1	0	—		—		—		35	0
Wisła Kraków	Total		46	0	1	0	—		—		—		47	0
Wisła Kraków II	2013–14	III liga, gr. H	1	0	—		—		—		—		1	0
Lech Poznań	2015–16	Ekstraklasa	9	0	5	0	—		9 (Note: Three appearances in UEFA Champions League, six appearances in UEFA Europa League)	0	1	0	24	0
Lech Poznań	2016–17	Ekstraklasa	0	0	1	0	—		—		0	0	1	0
Lech Poznań	Total		9	0	6	0	—		9	0	1	0	25	0
Lech Poznań II	2016–17	III liga, gr. II	3	0	—		—		—		—		3	0
Lech Poznań II	2017–18	III liga, gr. II	28	5	—		—		—		—		28	5
Lech Poznań II	2018–19	III liga, gr. II	25	5	—		—		—		—		25	5
Lech Poznań II	Total		56	10	—		—		—		—		56	10
Career total			397	21	41	2	17	1	36	0	2	0	493	24

=== International ===
Appearances and goals by national team and year
National team	Year	Apps	Goals
Poland	2004	2	0
Poland	2005	3	0
Poland	2006	5	0
Poland	2007	11	2
Poland	2008	12	0
Poland	2009	10	0
Poland	2010	5	0
Poland	2011	12	0
Poland	2012	5	0
Total		65	2

Scores and results list Poland's goal tally first, score column indicates score after each Dudka goal.

List of international goals scored by Dariusz Dudka
No.	Date	Venue	Opponent	Score	Result	Competition
1	3 February 2007	Jerez de la Frontera, Spain	Estonia	1–0	4–0	Friendly
2	24 March 2007	Warsaw, Poland	Azerbaijan	2–0	5–0	UEFA Euro 2008 qualifying

== Honours ==
Amica Wronki

- Polish Super Cup: 2000

Wisła Kraków

- Ekstraklasa: 2007–08

Lech Poznań

- Polish Super Cup: 2015

Lech Poznań II

- III liga, group II: 2018–19
