= Paweł Brożek =

Polish footballer (born 1983)

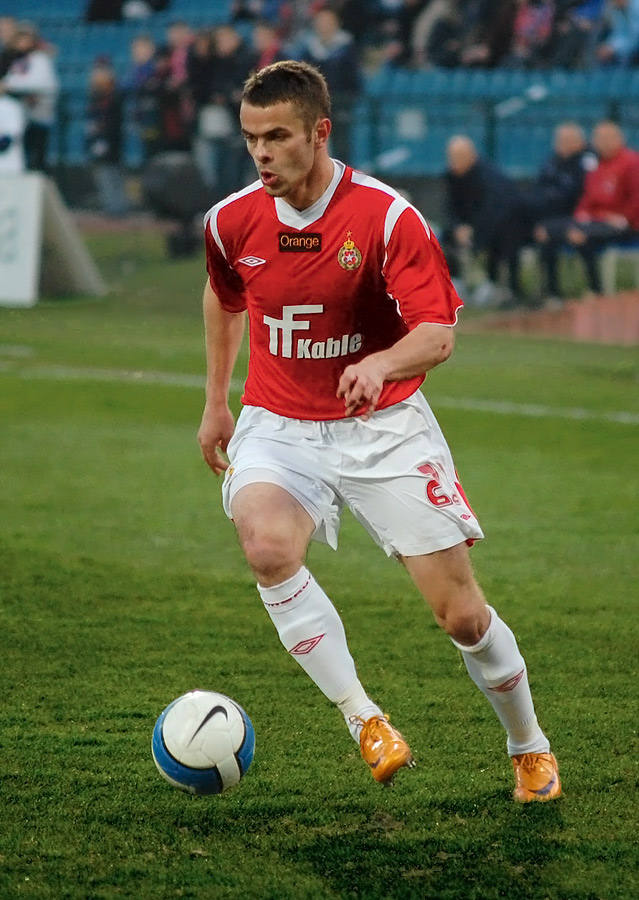
- Brożek with Wisła Kraków in 2009

Personal information
- Full name: Paweł Łukasz Brożek
- Date of birth: 21 April 1983 (age 43)
- Place of birth: Kielce, Poland
- Height: 1.80 m (5 ft 11 in)
- Position: Striker

Youth career
- 1992–1998: Polonia Białogon Kielce
- 1998: SMS Zabrze
- 1998–2000: Wisła Kraków

Senior career*
Years	Team	Apps	(Gls)
2001–2010	Wisła Kraków	178	(81)
2001–2002	→ ŁKS Łódź (loan)	8	(0)
2004–2005	→ GKS Katowice (loan)	20	(5)
2011–2012	Trabzonspor	19	(3)
2012	→ Celtic (loan)	3	(0)
2012–2013	Recreativo	18	(2)
2013–2020	Wisła Kraków	178	(63)
Total		424	(154)

International career
1999–2000	Poland U16	16	(7)
1999–2001	Poland U17	14	(7)
2000–2001	Poland U18	11	(3)
2001–2002	Poland U19	6	(3)
2003	Poland U20	7	(4)
2004–2005	Poland U21	11	(12)
2005–2014	Poland	38	(9)
Medal record
Men's football
Representing Poland
UEFA European Under-18 Championship
Winner	2001 Finland
- * Club domestic league appearances and goals

Paweł Łukasz Brożek (Polish pronunciation: [ˈpavɛw ˈbrɔʐɛk]; born 21 April 1983) is a Polish former professional footballer who played as a striker. Brożek represented various youth squads for Poland before making his debut for the senior team in 2005. He earned 38 caps, and competed at the 2006 FIFA World Cup and UEFA Euro 2012.

== Club career ==
=== Early career ===
Paweł Brożek was born in Kielce. In 1992, he began his career at Polonia Białogon Kielce, together with his twin brother Piotr. In 1998, he moved to Zabrze to play for SMS Zabrze. A half-a-year later, he joined Wisła Kraków, together with his brother.

=== Wisła Kraków ===
Brożek made his debut for Wisła Kraków in Ekstraklasa on 8 April 2001 in a match against Górnik Zabrze. On 21 April 2001, he scored his first goal in the Ekstraklasa in a match against Odra Wodzisław. In May 2001, Brożek signed a new 10-year contract with Wisła. He won the Ekstraklasa championship in 2000–01 season with Wisła Kraków. In 2002, he was loaned to ŁKS Łódź to play in the II liga. A half year later, he returned to Wisła Kraków and won with his second club Ekstraklasa title, in 2002–03 season. In 2004, he was loaned to GKS Katowice for a year and a half. He was a stand out player at GKS Katowice. In December 2004, he was invited for a trial together with his twin brother Piotr by West Ham United.

In January 2005, Brożek returned to Wisła Kraków, because the then Wisła manager Werner Lička wanted him to come back from loan. Brożek won the Ekstraklasa title in the 2004–05 season with Wisła Kraków. In the 2005–06 season, he began to play regularly for the Wisła Kraków first squad. Subsequently, he scored 13 goals in 30 matches. In 2006–07 season Brożek played very well in UEFA Cup, where he scored 4 goals in group stage matches against AS Nancy, FC Basel and Feyenoord Rotterdam. In the 2007–08 season, Brożek scored 23 goals in 27 matches and led Wisła Kraków to achieve the Ekstraklasa title. He was the league top scorer in the 2007–08 season. In the 2008–09 season, he won his sixth Ekstraklasa title with Wisła and was the Ekstraklasa top goal scorer for the second time in a row. In the following 2009–10 season, Brożek led his team in goals and assists while Wisła finished second in the league.

=== Trabzonspor ===
In January 2011, Brożek joined Turkish Süper Lig side Trabzonspor on a 2 1/2-year deal for an undisclosed fee from Wisła Kraków, along with his brother. Brożek made his debut for Trabzonspor in a Turkish Cup match against Beşiktaş on 26 January 2011, assisting Alanzinho's goal with a back-heel pass. In the 2010–11 Süper Lig season, he contributed with two goals and two assists for the eventual runners-up. In the following campaign, Brożek could not establish himself in the Trabzonspor starting line-up, blocked by Turkish international Burak Yılmaz, who played as the sole striker in the system preferred by coach Şenol Güneş.

=== Loan to Celtic ===
On 29 January 2012, Brożek agreed terms to join Scottish Premier League outfit Celtic on loan from Trabzonspor until the end of the season, subject to a medical. The following day, he signed a contract with Celtic after passing the medical exams. He was given the number 17 shirt. On 8 February 2012, he made his debut in the 4–0 win over Heart of Midlothian in a Scottish Premier League match, coming on as a second-half substitute for Scott Brown. He made three appearances in total for the eventual league champions, failing to score in any of them. At the end of his loan spell at Celtic, Brożek criticised Neil Lennon, stating that the Celtic manager "...promised me something and then another thing happened afterwards. I did not get many opportunities from him and I was left dry of games."

=== Recreativo de Huelva ===
In August 2012, Brożek joined Spanish second-tier club Recreativo de Huelva. Brożek did not play regularly and the team were nowhere near achieving promotion, eventually finishing in thirteenth place with Brożek scoring only twice in 18 league appearances. In June 2013, it was reported Brożek was leaving Recreativo.

=== Wisła Kraków ===
On 23 July 2013, it was reported that Brożek was undergoing medical tests with Wisła Kraków with a view to rejoining his previous club. Contract negotiations involved the player agreeing to lower his wages, but receive increased bonuses for wins and goals. A week later, Brożek's signing was confirmed.

On 3 May 2014, he scored a hat-trick against Pogoń Szczecin and also his 100th goal in Ekstraklasa, it took 227 appearances to achieve that.

Brożek retired from playing after the 2019–20 season.

== International career ==
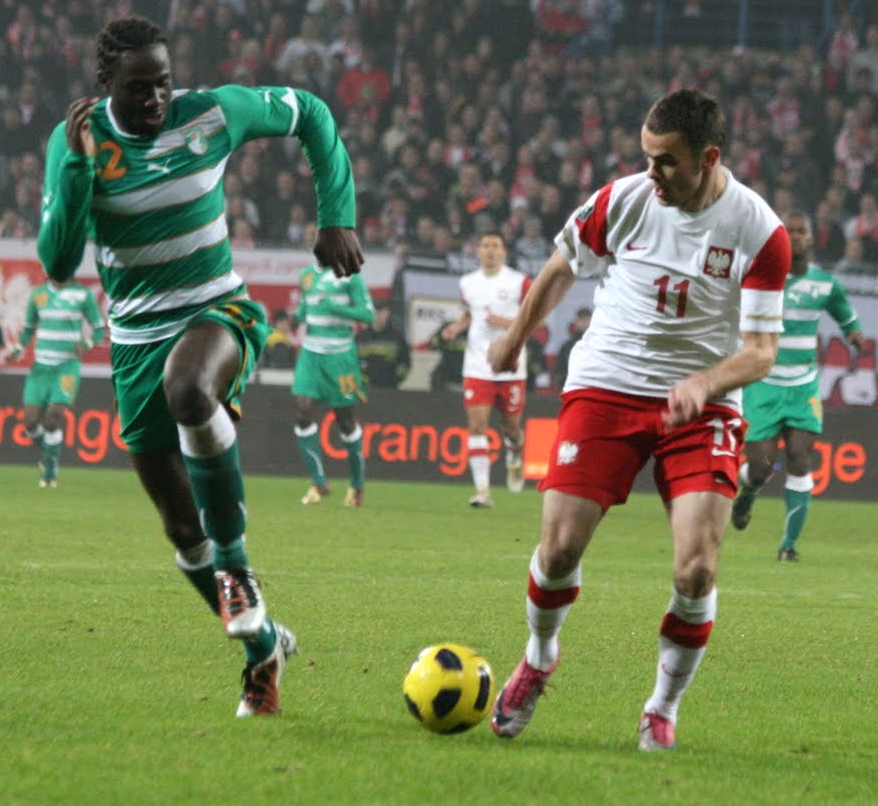
Brożek in a match against Ivory Coast

In 1999, he played at the FIFA U-17 World Championship tournament. In 2000 Brożek played at the UEFA European Under-16 Football Championship tournament. With Poland national under-17 football team Brożek won Vaclav Jezek Tournament in 2000 and was Top Goalscorer of the tournament with 6 goals. In 2001, he won UEFA European Under-18 Football Championship with Poland national under-18 football team. He played in first squad in all matches at the tournament. He was the youngest member of the team. All other under-18 team members were born in 1982, while Brożek was born in 1983. He showed a great performance in UEFA European Under-21 Championship 2004–2006 qualifying round where he scored 9 goals in 8 matches.

Brożek made his first appearance for the Poland national team against Mexico in 2005, scoring in the process. He was selected to the 23-man national squad for the 2006 FIFA World Cup finals held in Germany, where, coming on as a substitute, he nearly scored a goal against Ecuador in their 2–0 defeat, with a left foot shot that hit the post.

In May 2012, he was called up to the 23-man Poland national football team for UEFA Euro 2012. At the tournament, Brożek played in two group stage matches. Although he has not retired from international football, he has not appeared for the side since 2014.

== Personal life ==
His twin brother, Piotr, is also a former footballer.

== Career statistics ==
=== Club ===
Appearances and goals by club, season and competition
Club	Season	League			National cup (Note: Includes Polish Cup, Turkish Cup, Copa del Rey)		Europe		Other		Total	
Club	Season	Division	Apps	Goals	Apps	Goals	Apps	Goals	Apps	Goals	Apps	Goals
Wisła Kraków	1999–2000	Ekstraklasa	0	0	0	0	—		3 (Note: Appearances in Ekstraklasa Cup)	0	3	0
Wisła Kraków	2000–01	Ekstraklasa	8	1	0	0	0	0	1	0	9	1
Wisła Kraków	2001–02	Ekstraklasa	3	0	3	1	0	0	0	0	6	1
Wisła Kraków	2002–03	Ekstraklasa	5	0	3	2	1 (Note: Appearance(s) in UEFA Cup)	1	—		9	3
Wisła Kraków	2003–04	Ekstraklasa	8	2	0	0	2	0	—		10	2
Wisła Kraków	2004–05	Ekstraklasa	9	0	5	2	—		0	0	14	2
Wisła Kraków	2005–06	Ekstraklasa	30	13	4	2	4 (Note: Two appearances and one goal in UEFA Champions League, two appearances in UEFA Cup)	1	—		38	16
Wisła Kraków	2006–07	Ekstraklasa	23	7	2	1	6	4	6	3	37	15
Wisła Kraków	2007–08	Ekstraklasa	27	23	6	3	—		2	0	35	26
Wisła Kraków	2008–09	Ekstraklasa	27	19	3	2	6 (Note: Four appearances and one goal in UEFA Champions League, two appearances and one goal in UEFA Cup)	3	0	0	36	24
Wisła Kraków	2009–10	Ekstraklasa	25	10	3	0	2 (Note: Appearances in UEFA Champions League)	0	1 (Note: Appearances in Polish Super Cup)	0	31	10
Wisła Kraków	2010–11	Ekstraklasa	13	6	1	1	4 (Note: Appearances in UEFA Europa League)	3	—		18	10
Wisła Kraków	Total		178	81	30	14	25	12	13	3	246	110
ŁKS Łódź (loan)	2001–02	I liga	8	0	—		—		—		8	0
GKS Katowice (loan)	2003–04	Ekstraklasa	8	3	2	0	—		—		10	3
GKS Katowice (loan)	2004–05	Ekstraklasa	12	2	4	1	—		—		16	3
GKS Katowice (loan)	Total		20	5	6	1	—		—		26	6
Trabzonspor	2010–11	Süper Lig	12	2	1	0	—		—		13	2
Trabzonspor	2011–12	Süper Lig	7	1	0	0	4	0	—		11	1
Trabzonspor	Total		19	3	1	0	4	0	—		24	3
Celtic	2011–12	Scottish Premier League	3	0	0	0	—		—		3	0
Recreativo Huelva	2012–13	Segunda División	18	2	1	0	—		—		19	2
Wisła Kraków	2013–14	Ekstraklasa	33	17	2	1	—		—		35	18
Wisła Kraków	2014–15	Ekstraklasa	35	15	0	0	—		—		35	15
Wisła Kraków	2015–16	Ekstraklasa	29	14	1	0	—		—		30	14
Wisła Kraków	2016–17	Ekstraklasa	31	6	2	1	—		—		33	7
Wisła Kraków	2017–18	Ekstraklasa	17	1	2	0	—		—		19	1
Wisła Kraków	2018–19	Ekstraklasa	14	2	1	0	—		—		15	2
Wisła Kraków	2019–20	Ekstraklasa	19	8	0	0	—		—		19	8
Wisła Kraków	Total		178	63	8	2	—		—		186	65
Career total			424	154	46	17	29	12	13	3	512	186

=== International ===
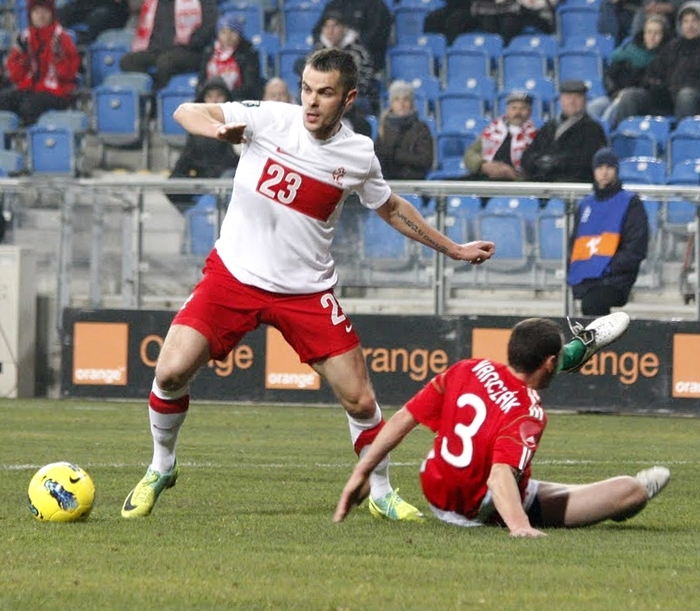
Brożek playing for Poland

Appearances and goals by national team and year
National team	Year	Apps	Goals
Poland	2005	2	1
Poland	2006	5	0
Poland	2007	2	0
Poland	2008	5	1
Poland	2009	6	1
Poland	2010	3	2
Poland	2011	9	3
Poland	2012	4	0
Poland	2013	1	0
Poland	2014	1	1
Total		38	9

Scores and results list Poland's goal tally first, score column indicates score after each Brożek goal.

List of international goals scored by Paweł Brożek
No	Date	Venue	Opponent	Score	Result	Competition
1	27 April 2005	Soldier Field, Chicago, United States	Mexico	1–1	1–1	Friendly
2	11 October 2008	Silesian Stadium, Chorzów, Poland	Czech Republic	1–0	2–1	2010 FIFA World Cup qualification
3	7 February 2009	Complexo Desportivo, Vila Real de Santo António, Portugal	Lithuania	1–0	1–1	Friendly
4	10 December 2010	Mardan Sports Complex Antalya, Turkey	Bosnia and Herzegovina	1–0	2–2	Friendly
5	10 December 2010	Mardan Sports Complex Antalya, Turkey	Bosnia and Herzegovina	2–1	2–2	Friendly
6	5 June 2011	Pepsi Arena, Warsaw, Poland	Argentina	2–1	2–1	Friendly
7	2 September 2011	Pepsi Arena, Warsaw, Poland	Mexico	1–0	1–1	Friendly
8	15 November 2011	Poznań Stadium, Poznań, Poland	Hungary	1–0	2–1	Friendly
9	20 January 2014	Zayed Sports City Stadium, Abu Dhabi, United Arab Emirates	Moldova	1–0	1–0	Friendly

== Honours ==
Wisła Kraków U19

- Polish U-19 Championship: 2000

Wisła Kraków

- Ekstraklasa: 2000–01, 2002–03, 2003–04, 2004–05, 2007–08, 2008–09, 2010–11
- Polish Cup: 2001–02, 2002–03
- Polish League Cup: 2000–01
- Polish Super Cup: 2001

Celtic

- Scottish Premier League: 2011–12

Poland U18

- UEFA European Under-18 Championship: 2001

Individual

- Ekstraklasa top scorer: 2007–08, 2008–09
- Ekstraklasa Player of the Year: 2008
- Ekstraklasa Player of the Season: 2008–09
- Ekstraklasa Player of the Month: September 2019
- Ekstraklasa Hall of Fame: 2023
