= Piotr Brożek =

Polish footballer (born 1983)

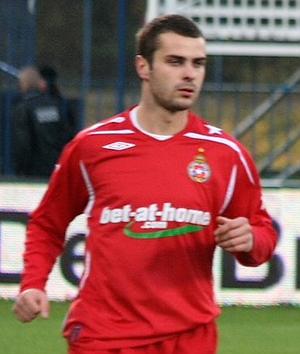
- Brożek with Wisła Kraków in 2009

Personal information
- Full name: Piotr Czesław Brożek
- Date of birth: 21 April 1983 (age 43)
- Place of birth: Kielce, Poland
- Height: 1.78 m (5 ft 10 in)
- Positions: Left-back; left winger

Team information
- Current team: Świt Krzeszowice
- Number: 14

Youth career
- 1992–1998: Polonia Białogon Kielce
- 1998: SMS Zabrze
- 1998–2001: Wisła Kraków

Senior career*
| Years | Team | Apps | (Gls) |
| 2001–2010 | Wisła Kraków | 156 | (11) |
| 2002 | → ŁKS Łódź (loan) | 5 | (0) |
| 2004–2005 | → Górnik Zabrze (loan) | 22 | (3) |
| 2011–2012 | Trabzonspor | 7 | (0) |
| 2012–2013 | Lechia Gdańsk | 24 | (1) |
| 2013–2014 | Wisła Kraków | 22 | (0) |
| 2014–2015 | Piast Gliwice | 23 | (0) |
| 2023– | Świt Krzeszowice | 80 | (47) |

International career
| 1999 | Poland U15 | 2 | (0) |
| 1999–2000 | Poland U16 | 17 | (11) |
| 1999–2001 | Poland U17 | 16 | (4) |
| 2001–2002 | Poland U19 | 5 | (2) |
| 2002–2003 | Poland U20 | 8 | (3) |
| 2003–2005 | Poland U21 | 15 | (4) |
| 2008–2010 | Poland | 5 | (1) |
- * Club domestic league appearances and goals as of 18:16, 30 June 2026 (UTC)

Piotr Czesław Brożek (born 21 April 1983) is a Polish footballer who plays as a left-back or left winger for V liga Lesser Poland club Świt Krzeszowice.

== Club career ==
Born in Kielce, Brożek was a product of the Polonia Białogon Kielce youth system, and moved to Wisła Kraków in 1998. He made his Ekstraklasa debut for Wisła Kraków on 8 September 2001, in a match against GKS Katowice.

During the 2004–05 Ekstraklasa season, Brożek was loaned to Górnik Zabrze; there he appeared in 22 games, scoring 3 goals.

Brożek won the Ekstraklasa championship four times with Wisła Kraków.

In January 2011, Brożek, together with his twin brother Paweł, joined Turkish Süper Lig side Trabzonspor on a 2 1/2-year deal for an undisclosed fee from Wisła Kraków.

== International career ==
Brożek played internationally for Poland, beginning with the Under-15 level and up to the senior national team. He made his first appearance for the Poland senior national team on 8 February 2008, in a friendly match against Finland.

== Personal life ==
His twin brother, Paweł Brożek, was also a footballer.

== Career statistics ==
=== Club ===
As of match played 13 June 2026

Appearances and goals by club, season and competition
| Club | Season | League | | | National cup (Note: Includes Polish Cup, Turkish Cup) | | Europe | | Other | | Total | |
| Club | Season | Division | Apps | Goals | Apps | Goals | Apps | Goals | Apps | Goals | Apps | Goals |
|---|---|---|---|---|---|---|---|---|---|---|---|---|
| Wisła Kraków | 2001–02 | Ekstraklasa | 1 | 0 | 1 | 0 | 0 | 0 | 1 (Note: Appearance in Polish League Cup) | 0 | 3 | 0 |
| Wisła Kraków | 2002–03 | Ekstraklasa | 9 | 0 | 6 | 0 | 3 (Note: Appearances in UEFA Cup) | 0 | — | | 18 | 0 |
| Wisła Kraków | 2003–04 | Ekstraklasa | 18 | 3 | 1 | 0 | 5 (Note: One appearance in UEFA Champions League, four appearances in UEFA Cup) | 0 | — | | 24 | 3 |
| Wisła Kraków | 2005–06 | Ekstraklasa | 18 | 1 | 2 | 0 | 0 | 0 | — | | 20 | 1 |
| Wisła Kraków | 2006–07 | Ekstraklasa | 21 | 3 | 2 | 0 | 7 | 1 | 8 (Note: Appearances in Ekstraklasa Cup) | 0 | 38 | 4 |
| Wisła Kraków | 2007–08 | Ekstraklasa | 27 | 2 | 5 | 0 | — | | 6 | 1 | 38 | 3 |
| Wisła Kraków | 2008–09 | Ekstraklasa | 27 | 0 | 3 | 0 | 5 (Note: Four appearances in UEFA Champions League, one appearance in UEFA Cup) | 0 | 3 | 1 | 38 | 1 |
| Wisła Kraków | 2009–10 | Ekstraklasa | 28 | 2 | 3 | 0 | 2 (Note: Appearances in UEFA Champions League) | 0 | 1 (Note: Appearance in Polish Super Cup) | 0 | 34 | 2 |
| Wisła Kraków | 2010–11 | Ekstraklasa | 7 | 0 | 1 | 0 | 4 (Note: Appearances in UEFA Europa League) | 2 | — | | 12 | 2 |
| Wisła Kraków | Total | | 156 | 11 | 24 | 0 | 26 | 0 | 19 | 2 | 225 | 13 |
| ŁKS Łódź (loan) | 2001–02 | II liga | 5 | 0 | — | | — | | — | | 5 | 0 |
| Górnik Zabrze (loan) | 2004–05 | Ekstraklasa | 22 | 3 | 5 | 1 | — | | — | | 27 | 4 |
| Trabzonspor | 2010–11 | Süper Lig | 7 | 0 | 1 | 0 | — | | — | | 8 | 0 |
| Trabzonspor | 2011–12 | Süper Lig | 0 | 0 | 0 | 0 | 0 | 0 | 0 | 0 | 0 | 0 |
| Trabzonspor | Total | | 7 | 0 | 1 | 0 | 0 | 0 | 0 | 0 | 8 | 0 |
| Lechia Gdańsk | 2012–13 | Ekstraklasa | 24 | 1 | 0 | 0 | — | | — | | 24 | 1 |
| Wisła Kraków | 2013–14 | Ekstraklasa | 22 | 0 | 0 | 0 | — | | — | | 22 | 0 |
| Piast Gliwice | 2014–15 | Ekstraklasa | 23 | 0 | 1 | 0 | — | | — | | 24 | 0 |
| Świt Krzeszowice | 2022–23 | Regional league Kr. I | 9 | 9 | — | | — | | — | | 9 | 9 |
| Świt Krzeszowice | 2023–24 | Regional league Kr. I | 25 | 16 | — | | — | | — | | 25 | 16 |
| Świt Krzeszowice | 2024–25 | Regional league Kr. I | 26 | 21 | — | | — | | 2 (Note: Appearances in regional league promotion play-offs) | 0 | 28 | 21 |
| Świt Krzeszowice | 2025–26 | V liga Les. Pol. West | 18 | 1 | — | | — | | — | | 18 | 1 |
| Świt Krzeszowice | Total | | 78 | 47 | — | | — | | 2 | 0 | 80 | 47 |
| Career total | | | 337 | 62 | 31 | 1 | 26 | 0 | 19 | 2 | 415 | 65 |

=== International ===
Appearances and goals by national team and year
| National team | Year | Apps | Goals |
|---|---|---|---|
| Poland | 2008 | 1 | 0 |
| Poland | 2009 | 1 | 0 |
| Poland | 2010 | 3 | 1 |
| Total | | 5 | 1 |

Scores and results list Poland's goal tally first, score column indicates score after each Brożek goal.

List of international goals scored by Piotr Brożek
| No. | Date | Venue | Opponent | Score | Result | Competition |
|---|---|---|---|---|---|---|
| 1 | 23 January 2010 | 80th Birthday Stadium, Nakhon Ratchasima, Thailand | Singapore | 4–1 | 6–1 | 2010 King's Cup |

== Honours ==
Wisła Kraków

- Ekstraklasa: 2002–03, 2003–04, 2007–08, 2008–09
- Polish Cup: 2002–03
