= Fryc =

Fryc is a surname. Notable people with the surname include:

- Patryk Fryc (born 1993), Polish footballer
- Stefan Fryc (1894–1943), Polish footballer
