= Radosław Sobolewski =

Polish footballer (born 1976)

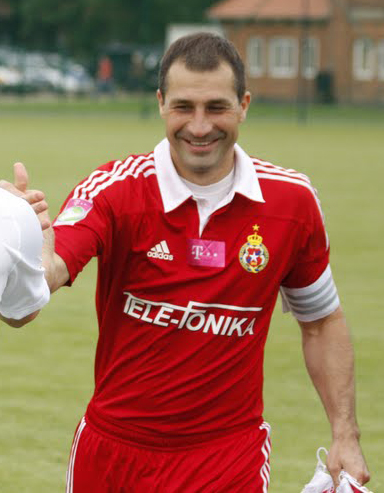
- Sobolewski captaining Wisła Kraków in 2012

Personal information
- Full name: Radosław Sobolewski
- Date of birth: 13 December 1976 (age 49)
- Place of birth: Białystok, Poland
- Height: 1.82 m (6 ft 0 in)
- Position: Midfielder

Team information
- Current team: Poland U19 (manager)

Senior career*
| Years | Team | Apps | (Gls) |
| 1994–1997 | Jagiellonia Białystok | 98 | (17) |
| 1998–2002 | Wisła Płock | 110 | (12) |
| 2003–2004 | Dyskobolia Grodzisk | 38 | (7) |
| 2005–2013 | Wisła Kraków | 186 | (14) |
| 2013–2016 | Górnik Zabrze | 80 | (10) |
| Total | | 512 | (60) |

International career
| 1994 | Poland U18 | 2 | (0) |
| 1996 | Poland U18 | 2 | (0) |
| 2004 | Poland B | 1 | (0) |
| 2003–2007 | Poland | 32 | (1) |

Managerial career
- 2016–2017: Wisła Kraków (caretaker)
- 2017: Wisła Kraków (caretaker)
- 2019–2021: Wisła Płock
- 2022–2023: Wisła Kraków
- 2024: Odra Opole
- 2025–2026: Poland U18
- 2026–: Poland U19
- * Club domestic league appearances and goals

Radosław Sobolewski (Polish pronunciation: [raˈdɔswaf sɔbɔˈlɛfskʲi]; born 13 December 1976) is a Polish professional football manager and former player who played as a defensive midfielder. He is currently the manager of the Poland national under-19 team. He played for the Poland senior team, earning 32 caps and scoring once.

== Club career ==
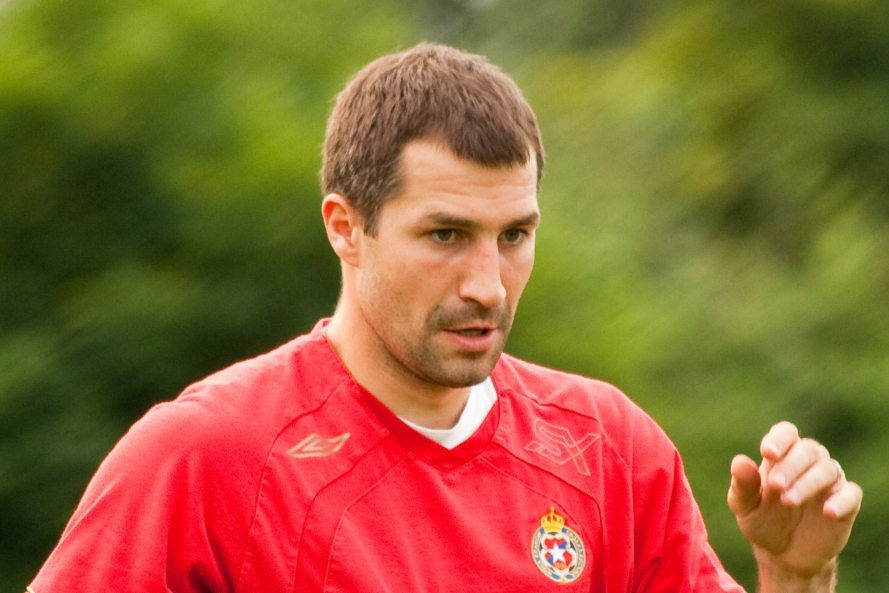
Sobolewski in 2009 with Wisła Kraków

Born in Białystok, Sobolewski started his career playing for Jagiellonia Białystok. In 1998, he was transferred to Wisła Płock, where he played for the next four years. He debuted in the top division on 7 March 1998 playing for Wisła Płock against Raków Częstochowa. In January 2003 he joined Dyskobolia Grodzisk Wielkopolski, where he stayed until December 2004. In January 2005, he moved to Wisła Kraków, helping the team win four Ekstraklasa titles, in 2004–05, 2007–08, 2008–09 and 2010–11 seasons.

During the 2005–06 winter transfer period, he was approached by English side Southampton. However, the offer was turned down by Wisła Kraków's board.

== International career ==
Sobolewski was selected to the 23-men national squad for the 2006 FIFA World Cup finals in Germany. At this tournament, he received a red card for two bookable offences in his team's second group-stage match against Germany. He was the fourth player to see red in the tournament and the first Polish player to be sent off in the World Cup.

Sobolewski retired from international football on 20 November 2007, shocking Polish football fans by doing so as it was just three days after Poland's 2–0 win over Belgium which ensured their passage to Euro 2008.

== Coaching career ==
After retiring in the summer 2016, Sobolewski became assistant manager of his former club Wisła Kraków. During his period at the club, which lasted until August 2019, Sobolewski was appointed joint-caretaker manager alongside the club's second assistant manager, Kazimierz Kmiecik, three times: The first time on 10 November 2016, when Dariusz Wdowczyk was fired until Kiko Ramírez was appointed on 5 January 2017. The second time on 10 December 2017, where Kiko Ramírez was fired again, for the rest of 2017 before Joan Carrillo was appointed manager. And the last and third time on 12 June 2018, where Carrillo was fired again, this time it lasted for only one week before a new manager was appointed.

On 7 August 2019, he was appointed manager of Wisła Płock.

On 12 April 2021, he was fired from Wisła Płock.

On 14 February 2022, Sobolewski was appointed assistant manager at Wisła Kraków after Jerzy Brzęczek became their head coach.

On 3 October 2022, following Brzęczek's dismissal, he became Wisła's new head coach. On 1 December 2023, following a 3–1 league defeat against Bruk-Bet Termalica Nieciecza, Sobolewski resigned from his post during the post-match press conference, and he left the club the following day.

On 31 May 2024, Sobolewski returned to management by taking charge of another I liga club Odra Opole, on a two-year deal. Following three straight league defeats, including a 0–5 away loss to his former club Wisła Kraków, he was dismissed on 30 September 2024.

On 11 August 2025, Sobolewski was appointed the manager of the Poland national under-18 team.

== Career statistics ==
=== Club ===
Appearances and goals by club, season and competition
| Club | Season | League | | | Polish Cup | | Europe | | Other | | Total | |
| Club | Season | Division | Apps | Goals | Apps | Goals | Apps | Goals | Apps | Goals | Apps | Goals |
|---|---|---|---|---|---|---|---|---|---|---|---|---|
| Jagiellonia Białystok | 1994–95 | I liga | 32 | 3 | 1 | 0 | — | | — | | 33 | 3 |
| Jagiellonia Białystok | 1995–96 | I liga | 27 | 1 | 2 | 0 | — | | — | | 29 | 1 |
| Jagiellonia Białystok | 1996–97 | II liga | 23 | 4 | 0 | 0 | — | | — | | 23 | 4 |
| Jagiellonia Białystok | 1997–98 | II liga | 16 | 9 | — | | — | | — | | 16 | 9 |
| Jagiellonia Białystok | Total | | 98 | 17 | 3 | 0 | — | | — | | 101 | 17 |
| Wisła Płock | 1997–98 | Ekstraklasa | 17 | 1 | — | | — | | — | | 17 | 1 |
| Wisła Płock | 1998–99 | I liga | 26 | 1 | 2 | 1 | — | | — | | 28 | 2 |
| Wisła Płock | 1999–2000 | Ekstraklasa | 28 | 1 | 3 | 0 | — | | 3 (Note: Appearance(s) in Polish League Cup) | 0 | 34 | 1 |
| Wisła Płock | 2000–01 | Ekstraklasa | 25 | 6 | 4 | 0 | — | | 1 | 0 | 30 | 6 |
| Wisła Płock | 2001–02 | I liga | 14 | 3 | 1 | 0 | — | | 4 | 0 | 19 | 3 |
| Wisła Płock | 2002–03 | II liga | 0 | 0 | 0 | 0 | — | | — | | 0 | 0 |
| Wisła Płock | Total | | 110 | 12 | 10 | 1 | — | | 8 | 0 | 128 | 13 |
| Dyskobolia | 2002–03 | Ekstraklasa | 14 | 3 | — | | — | | — | | 14 | 3 |
| Dyskobolia | 2003–04 | Ekstraklasa | 16 | 4 | 1 | 0 | 4 (Note: Appearance(s) in UEFA Cup) | 0 | — | | 21 | 4 |
| Dyskobolia | 2004–05 | Ekstraklasa | 8 | 0 | 5 | 0 | — | | — | | 13 | 0 |
| Dyskobolia | Total | | 38 | 7 | 6 | 0 | 4 | 0 | — | | 48 | 7 |
| Wisła Kraków | 2004–05 | Ekstraklasa | 12 | 1 | 5 | 0 | — | | — | | 17 | 1 |
| Wisła Kraków | 2005–06 | Ekstraklasa | 27 | 3 | 2 | 0 | 3 (Note: Two appearances and one goal in UEFA Champions League, one appearance in UEFA Cup) | 1 | — | | 32 | 4 |
| Wisła Kraków | 2006–07 | Ekstraklasa | 18 | 2 | 1 | 0 | 7 | 0 | 2 (Note: Appearance(s) in Ekstraklasa Cup) | 0 | 28 | 2 |
| Wisła Kraków | 2007–08 | Ekstraklasa | 25 | 2 | 4 | 0 | — | | 3 | 1 | 32 | 3 |
| Wisła Kraków | 2008–09 | Ekstraklasa | 28 | 3 | 2 | 0 | 5 (Note: Three appearances in UEFA Champions League, three appearances in UEFA Cup) | 0 | 3 | 0 | 38 | 3 |
| Wisła Kraków | 2009–10 | Ekstraklasa | 20 | 1 | 1 | 0 | 2 (Note: Appearance(s) in UEFA Champions League) | 0 | 1 (Note: Appearance in Polish Super Cup) | 0 | 24 | 1 |
| Wisła Kraków | 2010–11 | Ekstraklasa | 26 | 1 | 2 | 0 | 4 (Note: Appearance(s) in UEFA Europa League) | 0 | — | | 32 | 1 |
| Wisła Kraków | 2011–12 | Ekstraklasa | 11 | 0 | 0 | 0 | 8 (Note: Six appearances in UEFA Champions League, two appearances in UEFA Europa League) | 0 | — | | 19 | 0 |
| Wisła Kraków | 2012–13 | Ekstraklasa | 19 | 1 | 5 | 1 | — | | — | | 24 | 2 |
| Wisła Kraków | Total | | 186 | 14 | 22 | 1 | 29 | 1 | 9 | 1 | 246 | 17 |
| Górnik Zabrze | 2013–14 | Ekstraklasa | 33 | 7 | 4 | 1 | — | | — | | 37 | 8 |
| Górnik Zabrze | 2014–15 | Ekstraklasa | 30 | 0 | 0 | 0 | — | | — | | 30 | 0 |
| Górnik Zabrze | 2015–16 | Ekstraklasa | 17 | 3 | 0 | 0 | — | | — | | 17 | 3 |
| Górnik Zabrze | Total | | 80 | 10 | 4 | 1 | — | | — | | 84 | 11 |
| Career total | | | 512 | 60 | 45 | 3 | 33 | 1 | 17 | 1 | 607 | 65 |

=== International ===
Appearances and goals by national team and year
| National team | Year | Apps | Goals |
|---|---|---|---|
Poland
| Poland | 2004 | 4 | 1 |
| Poland | 2005 | 10 | 0 |
| Poland | 2006 | 10 | 0 |
| Poland | 2007 | 8 | 0 |
| Total | | 32 | 1 |

Scores and results list Poland's goal tally first, score column indicates score after each Sobolewski goal.

List of international goals scored by Radosław Sobolewski
| No. | Date | Venue | Opponent | Score | Result | Competition |
|---|---|---|---|---|---|---|
| 1 | 20 August 2003 | Lilleküla Stadium, Tallinn, Estonia | Estonia | 1–0 | 2–1 | Friendly |

== Managerial statistics ==
As of match played 17 November 2026

Managerial record by team and tenure
| Team | From | To | Record | | | | | | | |
| Team | From | To | G | W | D | L | GF | GA | GD | Win % |
|---|---|---|---|---|---|---|---|---|---|---|
| Wisła Kraków (caretaker) | 11 November 2016 | 5 January 2017 | 6 | 2 | 1 | 3 | 13 | 13 | +0 | 33.33 |
| Wisła Kraków (caretaker) | 10 December 2017 | 31 December 2017 | 2 | 1 | 0 | 1 | 5 | 3 | +2 | 50.00 |
| Wisła Płock | 5 August 2019 | 12 April 2021 | 62 | 22 | 17 | 23 | 74 | 86 | −12 | 35.48 |
| Wisła Kraków | 3 October 2022 | 2 December 2023 | 44 | 23 | 11 | 10 | 97 | 59 | +38 | 52.27 |
| Odra Opole | 31 May 2024 | 30 September 2024 | 11 | 3 | 2 | 6 | 14 | 20 | −6 | 27.27 |
| Poland U18 | 11 August 2025 | 23 June 2026 | 10 | 5 | 4 | 1 | 18 | 10 | +8 | 50.00 |
| Poland U19 | 23 June 2026 | Present | 5 | 4 | 0 | 1 | 12 | 3 | +9 | 80.00 |
| Total | | | 140 | 60 | 35 | 45 | 233 | 194 | +39 | 42.86 |

== Honours ==
=== Player ===
Wisła Płock

- I liga: 1998–99

Wisła Kraków

- Ekstraklasa: 2004–05, 2007–08, 2008–09, 2010–11

Individual

- Ekstraklasa Player of the Year: 2013
- Ekstraklasa Midfielder of the Year: 2005
- Ekstraklasa Player of the Month: March 2009

=== Manager ===
Individual

- Ekstraklasa Coach of the Month: September 2019, October 2019
