= Jacek Bednarz =

Polish footballer (born 1967)

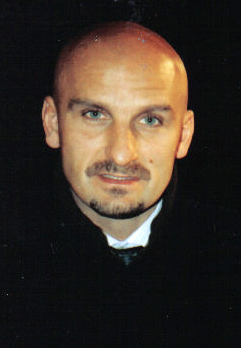
- Bednarz in 2007

Personal information
- Date of birth: 5 June 1967 (age 59)
- Place of birth: Mysłowice, Poland
- Height: 1.76 m (5 ft 9 in)
- Positions: Defender; midfielder

Team information
- Current team: Zagłębie Lubin (chairman)

Senior career*
Years	Team	Apps	(Gls)
1985–1990	AKS Chorzów		
1990–1994	Ruch Chorzów	113	(10)
1994–2000	Legia Warsaw	162	(12)
2000–2002	Pogoń Szczecin	42	(0)

International career
1993–1996	Poland	5	(0)
- * Club domestic league appearances and goals

Jacek Bednarz (born 5 June 1967) is a Polish football executive and former player. He is currently the chairman of Ekstraklasa club Zagłębie Lubin.

== Honours ==
Legia Warsaw

- Ekstraklasa: 1994–95
- Polish Cup: 1994–95, 1996–97
- Polish Super Cup: 1997
