= Emmanuel Sarki =

Haitian footballer (born 1987)

Personal information
- Date of birth: 26 December 1987 (age 38)
- Place of birth: Kaduna, Nigeria
- Height: 1.80 m (5 ft 11 in)
- Position: Winger

Team information
- Current team: Orzeł Cikowice

Youth career
- 2003–2004: Grays International
- 2004–2005: Lyn Oslo
- 2005–2006: Chelsea

Senior career*
Years	Team	Apps	(Gls)
2006–2010	Chelsea	0	(0)
2006–2010	→ Westerlo (loan)	72	(1)
2010–2011	Ashdod	31	(1)
2011–2012	Waasland-Beveren	10	(0)
2013–2016	Wisła Kraków	69	(2)
2016	AEL Limassol	5	(0)
2018	Partizán Bardejov	22	(2)
2019	Węgrzcanka Węgrzce Wielkie	0	(0)
2019–2020	Odra Wodzisław	14	(4)
2020	→ Huragan Waksmund (loan)	6	(3)
2021	MKS Myszków	15	(1)
2021	Górnik 09 Mysłowice	0	(0)
2024	Batory Wola Batorska	10	(5)
2025–	Orzeł Cikowice	0	(0)

International career
2003	Nigeria U17	3	(0)
2006–2007	Nigeria U20	4	(2)
2008	Nigeria U23	2	(0)
2014	Haiti	4	(0)
- * Club domestic league appearances and goals as of 24 December 2024

Emmanuel Sarki (born 26 December 1987) is a professional footballer who plays as a winger for Polish club Orzeł Cikowice. Born in Nigeria, he played for the Haiti national team.

== Career ==
Sarki began his career at Grays International FC, before moving to Lyn Oslo in 2004. Subsequently, he went on trial to Chelsea and trained there for a few months. In early 2006, he became a Chelsea player, but quickly was loaned out to K.V.C. Westerlo.

After his contract expired with Waasland-Beveren, he trialled with Wisła Kraków and subsequently signed a two-year deal with them with an option for a third year. He made his debut against Polonia Warsaw as a substitute in the 56th minute. He joined AEL Limassol after his contract with Wisła Kraków ran out following a knee injury which ruled him out in the 2015–16 season.

On 17 March 2019, Sarki joined Polish fifth division club Węgrzcanka Węgrzce Wielkie. Four months later, he moved to Odra Wodzisław.

== International career ==
Sarki was member of the Nigeria national under-17 football team at 2003 FIFA U-17 World Championship in Finland and 2003 African U-17 Championship. In 2007, he played for the Nigeria national under-20 football team at African U-20 Championship, where he scored two goals for the eventual runners up.

In August 2014, Sarki was called up to the Haiti national team, qualifying because his maternal grandfather was born there. At the time of this call-up, Sarki was quoted as saying that he had twice been invited to pay some money to be involved with the Nigeria national team but had declined to pay.

Sarki was involved in Haiti's third-place finish in the 2014 Caribbean Cup, making his debut against Antigua and Barbuda and assisted Kervens Belfort in a 3–0 win over Martinique.

== Honours ==
MKS Myszków

- Polish Cup (Częstochowa regionals): 2020–21
