= Dawid Kamiński =

Polish footballer

Personal information
- Full name: Dawid Kamiński
- Date of birth: 13 February 1995 (age 31)
- Place of birth: Opole, Poland
- Height: 1.76 m (5 ft 9 in)
- Position: Midfielder

Team information
- Current team: Radziszowianka Radziszów
- Number: 8

Youth career
- TOR Dobrzeń Wielki
- 2008–2012: Wisła Kraków

Senior career*
Years	Team	Apps	(Gls)
2012–2015	Wisła Kraków	3	(0)
2014–2015	→ Termalica Bruk-Bet (loan)	24	(0)
2015–2016	Raków Częstochowa	36	(4)
2017	Widzew Łódź	21	(2)
2018	KSZO Ostrowiec	16	(3)
2018	Chojniczanka Chojnice	0	(0)
2018–2019	Motor Lublin	19	(0)
2019–2021	Stal Brzeg	40	(5)
2021	Borek Kraków	11	(5)
2022–2023	Tempo Białka	35	(8)
2022	→ Słomniczanka Słomniki (loan)	16	(2)
2024–	Radziszowianka Radziszów	26	(5)
- * Club domestic league appearances and goals as of 00:30, 2 January 2025 (UTC)

Dawid Kamiński (born 13 February 1995) is a Polish footballer who plays as a midfielder for V liga Lesser Poland club Radziszowianka Radziszów.

== Club career ==
Kamiński made his debut for Wisła Kraków in the Ekstraklasa on 31 August 2012 in a match against Polonia Warsaw.

On 4 September 2018, he signed a contract with Motor Lublin.

== Honours ==
Motor Lublin

- Polish Cup (Lublin subdistrict regionals): 2018–19
