= Michał Szewczyk (footballer) =

Polish footballer (born 1992)

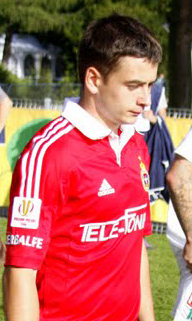

Personal information
- Date of birth: 17 October 1992 (age 34)
- Place of birth: Chorzów, Poland
- Height: 1.76 m (5 ft 9 in)
- Position: Winger

Team information
- Current team: Orzeł Ryczów
- Number: 6

Youth career
- Astra Spytkowice
- Skawa Wadowice
- Zatorzanka Zator
- 2010: Wisła Kraków

Senior career*
Years	Team	Apps	(Gls)
2010–2013	Wisła Kraków (ME)	54	(18)
2012–2014	Wisła Kraków	14	(0)
2013	→ Okocimski KS Brzesko (loan)	13	(1)
2014–2016	Ruch Chorzów	8	(0)
2016–2017	MKS Kluczbork	28	(4)
2017–2018	Bytovia Bytów	10	(0)
2018	Soła Oświęcim	8	(0)
2019	MKS Kluczbork	8	(3)
2020–2023	Unia Oświęcim	62	(36)
2023–	Orzeł Ryczów	26	(12)

International career
2012	Poland U21	1	(0)
- * Club domestic league appearances and goals as of 17:58, 17 October 2024 (UTC)

Michał Szewczyk (born 17 October 1992) is a Polish footballer who plays as a winger for Orzeł Ryczów.

== Club career ==
Szewczyk made his debut for Wisła Kraków in the Ekstraklasa on 31 August 2012 in a match against Polonia Warsaw.

He signed with Soła Oświęcim in August 2017, but left the club again at the end of 2018. On 24 January 2019, Szewczyk signed a six-month contract with MKS Kluczbork.
