= Łukasz Burliga =

Polish footballer (born 1988)

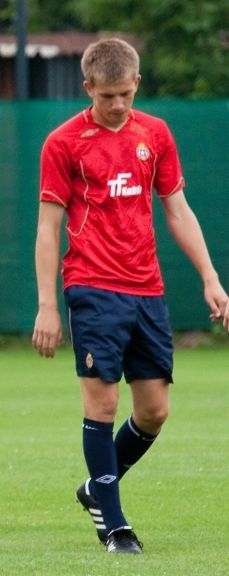
- Burliga with Wisła Kraków in 2009

Personal information
- Full name: Łukasz Burliga
- Date of birth: 10 May 1988 (age 38)
- Place of birth: Sucha Beskidzka, Poland
- Height: 1.86 m (6 ft 1 in)
- Position: Defender

Youth career
- 1996–2000: Garbarz Zembrzyce
- 2000–2006: Wisła Kraków
- → Garbarz Zembrzyce (loan)
- → Strzelec Budzów (loan)

Senior career*
Years	Team	Apps	(Gls)
2006–2007	Wisła Kraków II		
2007–2011	Wisła Kraków (MESA)	50	(16)
2008–2016	Wisła Kraków	111	(9)
2009	→ Flota Świnoujście (loan)	15	(1)
2011–2012	→ Ruch Chorzów (loan)	15	(0)
2016–2019	Jagiellonia Białystok	75	(2)
2019–2021	Wisła Kraków	46	(4)
2021–2022	Wieczysta Kraków	14	(5)
2022	Widzew Łódź II	8	(1)
2023–2024	Kalwarianka Kalwaria Z.	21	(1)

International career
2010	Poland U21	1	(0)

Managerial career
- 2023–2024: Kalwarianka Kalwaria Z. (player-manager)
- * Club domestic league appearances and goals as of 08:17, 24 June 2025 (UTC)

Łukasz Burliga (born 10 May 1988) is a Polish professional footballer who was most recently the player-manager of IV liga Lesser Poland club Kalwarianka Kalwaria Zebrzydowska.

== Career ==
In the 2007–08 season, he won the Młoda Ekstraklasa title with Wisła Kraków's youth team. During the 2008–09 season, he played 12 games and scored 12 goals in the Młoda Ekstraklasa.

During the second half of the 2008–09 season, he was loaned to I liga club Flota Świnoujście.

On 18 February 2016, he signed a three-and-a-half-year contract with Ekstraklasa side Jagiellonia Białystok. In 2019, he was signed by Wisła Kraków, and left them on 17 May 2021 to join the fifth-tier club Wieczysta Kraków.

On 26 July 2022, he terminated his contract with Wieczysta and moved to Łódź for family reasons, where he joined the reserve team of Widzew Łódź. On 8 November 2022, he left the club by mutual consent.

== Managerial statistics ==
As of match played 7 April 2024

Managerial record by team and tenure
Team	From	To	Record							
Team	From	To	G	W	D	L	GF	GA	GD	Win %
Kalwarianka Kalwaria Z. (player-manager)	9 July 2023	9 April 2024	24	9	5	10	45	43	+2	37.50
Total			24	9	5	10	45	43	+2	37.50

== Honours ==
Wisła Kraków (MESA)

- Młoda Ekstraklasa: 2007–08

Wisła Kraków

- Ekstraklasa: 2010–11

Wieczysta Kraków

- IV liga Lesser Poland West: 2021–22
- Polish Cup (Lesser Poland regionals): 2021–22
