= Danijel Klarić =

Austrian footballer

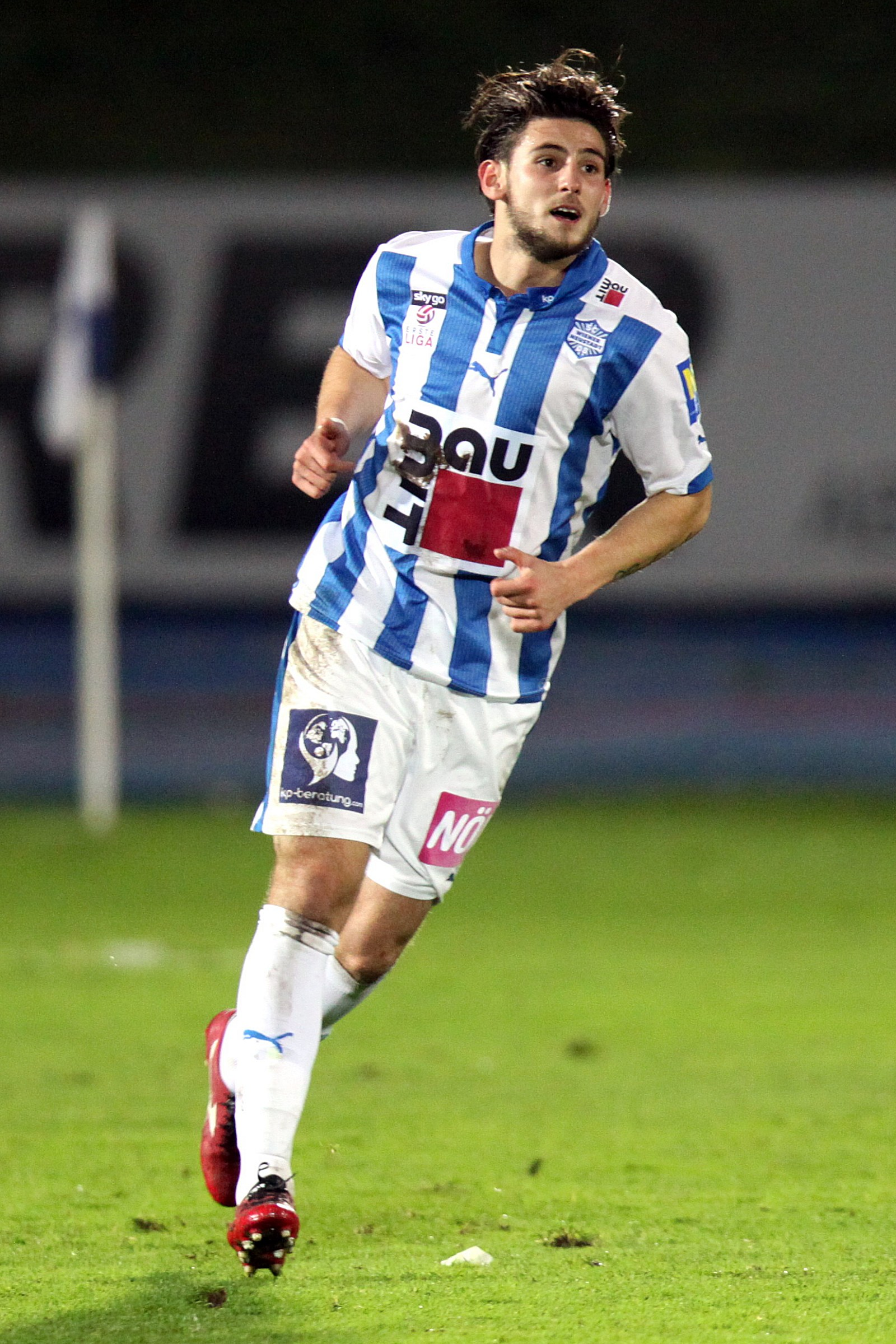

Personal information
- Full name: Danijel Klarić
- Date of birth: 19 January 1995 (age 31)
- Place of birth: Vienna, Austria
- Height: 1.77 m (5 ft 10 in)
- Position: Forward

Youth career
- 2006–2010: SK Cro-Vienna
- 2011: SK Rapid Wien
- 2011: FK Austria Wien
- 2012–2013: FC Admira Wacker Mödling

Senior career*
Years	Team	Apps	(Gls)
2014	Wisła Kraków II	8	(3)
2014	Wisła Kraków	2	(0)
2014–2016	Sturm Graz II	31	(23)
2015–2016	Sturm Graz	4	(0)
2015	→ Wiener Neustadt (loan)	10	(2)
2016–2017	Fidelis Andria	4	(0)
2017	Akragas	15	(2)
2018	FC Stadlau	21	(5)
2019	FCM Traiskirchen	10	(4)
2020–2021	Sportunion Mauer	4	(1)
2021	SV Wienerberg	3	(0)
- * Club domestic league appearances and goals

Danijel Klarić (born 19 January 1995) is an Austrian former professional footballer who played as a forward.

== Club career ==
Klarić spent most of his career with Austrian clubs in the four top levels of domestic football.
