= Dariusz Łatka =

Polish footballer

Personal information
- Full name: Dariusz Łatka
- Date of birth: 14 September 1978 (age 48)
- Place of birth: Kraków, Poland
- Height: 1.72 m (5 ft 8 in)
- Position: Midfielder

Youth career
- –1995: Wawel Kraków
- 1996–1997: Wisła Kraków

Senior career*
Years	Team	Apps	(Gls)
1997–1999	Wisła Kraków II		
1998–2002	Wisła Kraków	4	(0)
1998	→ Wawel Kraków (loan)	8	(0)
1999–2001	→ Hutnik Kraków (loan)	94	(4)
2002–2008	Jagiellonia Białystok	173	(15)
2009–2010	Korona Kielce	25	(1)
2010–2014	Podbeskidzie Bielsko-Biała	105	(1)
2014–2015	Jelgava	30	(1)
2016	Bałtyk Gdynia	14	(0)
2020–2021	Lőrinci Kitartás SE		
- * Club domestic league appearances and goals

Dariusz Łatka (born 14 September 1978) is a Polish former professional footballer who played as a midfielder.

== Honours ==
Jelgava

- Latvian Cup: 2014–15
