= Fabian Burdenski =

German footballer (born 1991)

Personal information
- Full name: Fabian-Herbert Burdenski
- Date of birth: 23 September 1991 (age 35)
- Place of birth: Bremen, Germany
- Height: 1.86 m (6 ft 1 in)
- Position: Midfielder

Team information
- Current team: Bayern Alzenau
- Number: 29

Youth career
- TSV Heiligenrode
- –2008: Brinkumer SV
- 2008–2010: Werder Bremen

Senior career*
Years	Team	Apps	(Gls)
2010–2011	FC Oberneuland	14	(1)
2011	VfB Oldenburg	15	(0)
2012–2013	1. FC Magdeburg	34	(0)
2013–2014	Wisła Kraków	8	(0)
2014–2015	FSV Frankfurt	0	(0)
2015–2016	Rot-Weiß Erfurt	1	(0)
2016–2017	FSV Frankfurt	6	(0)
2017–2018	Korona Kielce	7	(0)
2018	SSV Jeddeloh	6	(0)
2019–2022	FSV Frankfurt	64	(1)
2022–2023	Xerez Deportivo	14	(1)
2024–	Bayern Alzenau	10	(1)
- * Club domestic league appearances and goals as of 23 September 2024

Fabian-Herbert Burdenski (born 23 September 1991) is a German professional footballer who plays as a midfielder for Bayern Alzenau.

== Club career ==
On 22 July 2014, it was announced that he signed for FSV Frankfurt on a one-year deal.

In summer 2017, he transferred to Korona Kielce in the Polish Ekstraklasa.

Burdenski re-joined FSV Frankfurt on 18 December 2018.

== Personal life ==
He is the son of former German international goalkeeper Dieter Burdenski and grandchild of Herbert Burdenski who also was a German international.
