= Gordan Bunoza =

Bosnian-Herzegovinian footballer

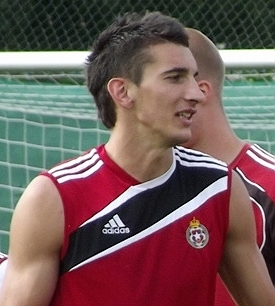
- Bunoza with Wisła Kraków

Personal information
- Full name: Gordan Bunoza
- Date of birth: 5 February 1988 (age 38)
- Place of birth: Ljubuški, SFR Yugoslavia
- Height: 1.98 m (6 ft 6 in)
- Position: Centre-back

Team information
- Current team: Karlovac 1919
- Number: 29

Youth career
- 2005: Ljubuški
- 2006: Kamen Ingrad
- 2006: ZET Zagreb
- 2007: Drava Ptuj

Senior career*
Years	Team	Apps	(Gls)
2008	Austria Lustenau Amateure	10	(1)
2008–2009	Hrvatski Dragovoljac	19	(1)
2009–2010	Karlovac	27	(1)
2010–2014	Wisła Kraków	70	(0)
2014–2016	Pescara	4	(0)
2015	→ Dinamo București (loan)	16	(1)
2016	Pandurii Târgu Jiu	13	(0)
2017–2020	Incheon United	60	(1)
2020–2021	AEL Limassol	9	(1)
2022	Arka Gdynia	10	(0)
2022-	Karlovac 1919		

International career
2004–2005	Bosnia and Herzegovina U17		
2005–2006	Bosnia and Herzegovina U19		
2009–2010	Bosnia and Herzegovina U21	9	(0)
- * Club domestic league appearances and goals as of 28 May 2022

Gordan Bunoza (born 5 February 1988) is a Bosnian-Herzegovinian professional footballer who plays as a centre-back for Croatian third-tier side Karlovac 1919.

== Club career ==
On 2 July 2010, Wisła Kraków signed him from Karlovac for an undisclosed fee. On 19 March 2011, Wisła Kraków announced that Bunoza will be out for the rest of the 2010–11 season due to an injury he suffered during the training.

Bunoza returned to Karlovac in summer 2022.

== International career ==
After several good performances for the U-21 side, the coach of the Bosnia-Herzegovina senior team, Safet Sušić, included Bunoza in the squad to face Luxembourg and France in early September 2010.

== Statistics ==
(correct as of 26 May 2022)

Club	Season	League			Cup		Continental		Other		Total	
Club	Season	Division	Apps	Goals	Apps	Goals	Apps	Goals	Apps	Goals	Apps	Goals
Austria Lustenau Amateure	2007–08	Vorarlberg-Liga	10	1	3	0	–		–		13	1
Hrvatski dragovoljac	2008–09	2. HNL	19	1	1	0	–		2	0	22	1
NK Karlovac	2009–10	1. HNL	27	1	2	0	–		–		29	1
Wisła Kraków	2010–11	Ekstraklasa	14	0	4	0	1	0	–		19	0
Wisła Kraków	2011–12	Ekstraklasa	11	0	3	1	1	0	–		15	1
Wisła Kraków	2012–13	Ekstraklasa	19	0	5	0	–		–		24	0
Wisła Kraków	2013–14	Ekstraklasa	26	0	1	0	–		–		27	0
Wisła Kraków	Total		70	0	13	1	2	0	–		85	1
Pescara	2014–15	Serie B	2	0	0	0	–		–		2	0
Pescara	2015–16	Serie B	2	0	0	0	–		–		2	0
Pescara	Total		4	0	0	0	–		–		4	0
Dinamo București (loan)	2014–15	Liga I	16	1	0	0	–		–		16	1
Pandurii Târgu Jiu	2015–16	Liga I	4	0	0	0	–		–		4	0
Pandurii Târgu Jiu	2016–17	Liga I	9	0	1	1	2	0	–		12	1
Pandurii Târgu Jiu	Total		13	0	1	1	2	0	–		16	1
Incheon United	2017	K League Classic	14	0	0	0	–		–		14	0
Incheon United	2018	K League 1	30	1	2	0	–		–		32	1
Incheon United	2019	K League 1	15	0	0	0	–		–		15	0
Incheon United	2020	K League 1	1	0	0	0	–		–		1	0
Incheon United	Total		60	1	2	0	–		–		62	1
AEL Limassol	2020–21	Cypriot First Division	9	0	1	0	–		–		10	0
Arka Gdynia	2021–22	I liga	10	0	1	0	–		–		11	0

== Honours ==
=== Club ===
Wisła Kraków

- Ekstraklasa: 2010–11
