= Dieter Burdenski =

German footballer (1950–2024)

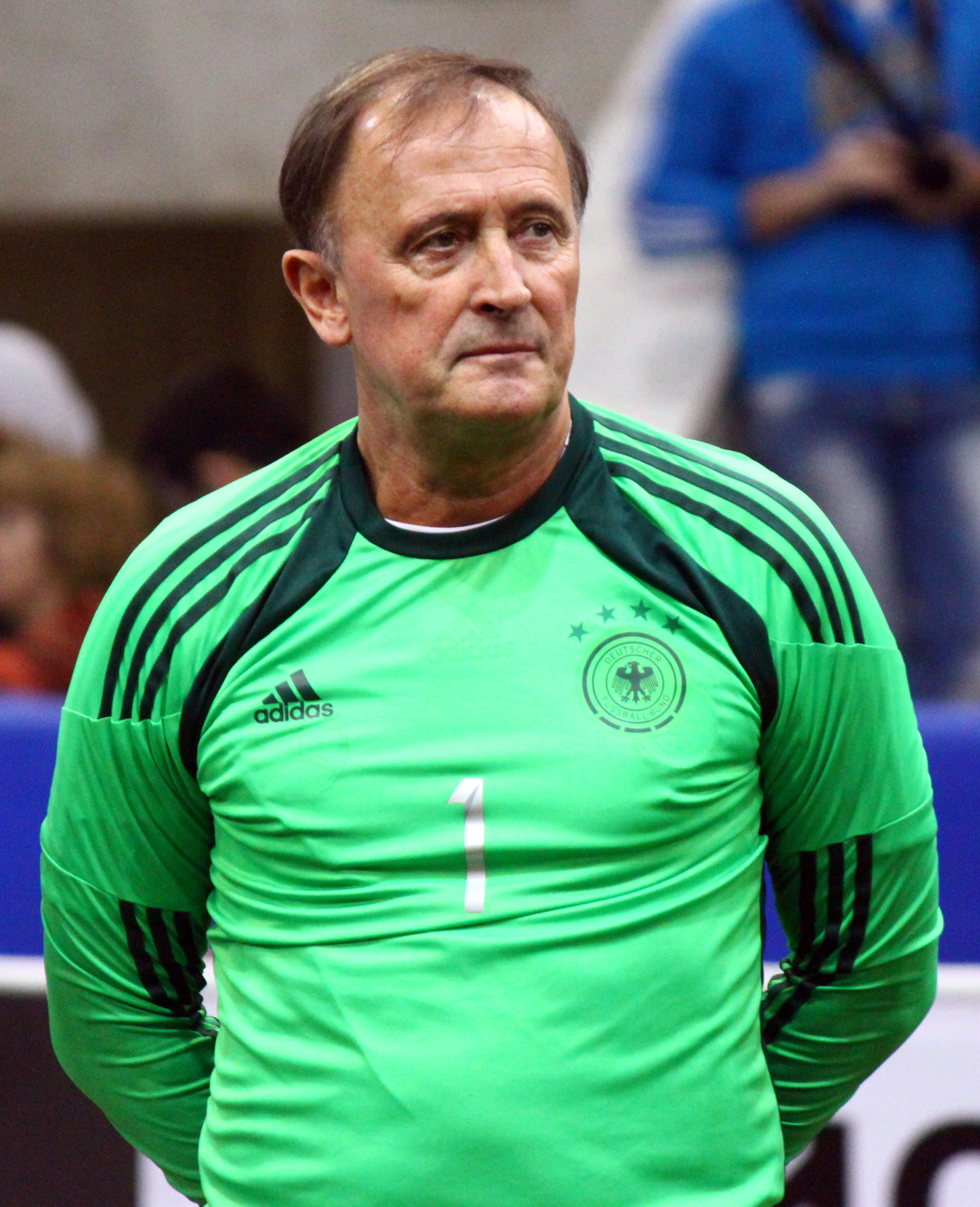
- Burdenski in 2015

Personal information
- Date of birth: 26 November 1950
- Place of birth: Bremen, West Germany
- Date of death: 9 October 2024 (aged 73)
- Place of death: Bremen, Germany
- Height: 1.81 m (5 ft 11 in)
- Position: Goalkeeper

Youth career
- 1962–1966: STV Horst-Emscher
- 1966–1969: Schalke 04

Senior career*
Years	Team	Apps	(Gls)
1969–1971	Schalke 04	3	(0)
1971–1972	Arminia Bielefeld	31	(0)
1972–1988	Werder Bremen	479	(1)
1988	AIK	1	(0)
1990–1991	Vitesse Arnhem	3	(0)
2002	Werder Bremen II	1	(0)
Total		518	(1)

International career
1977–1984	West Germany	12	(0)
- * Club domestic league appearances and goals

Dieter Burdenski (26 November 1950 – 9 October 2024) was a German professional footballer who played as a goalkeeper.

== Background ==
Burdenski was born in Bremen, Germany on 26 November 1950. He was the father of Fabian Burdenski (born 1991) and the son of Herbert Burdenski (1922–2001), who was a German international himself. An outfield player, unlike his son, Herbert Burdenski was capped five times (two goals) by Sepp Herberger, playing just two of these five games after World War II. Converting a penalty in West Germany's first post-war international (against Switzerland on 22 November 1950), Dieter Burdenski's father became the first ever goal scorer for the Federal Republic of Germany.

Burdenski died in Bremen on 9 October 2024, at the age of 73.

== Club career ==
=== Early career ===
Starting at STV Horst-Emscher, Burdenski joined Schalke 04 as a teenager to debut for the Gelsenkirchen outfit in three separate Bundesliga matches in the 1970–1971 season. One of those three, the 1–0 home defeat against Arminia Bielefeld on 17 April 1971, became later under scrutiny through the German Football Association in the match fixing Bundesligaskandal. Although Burdenski conceded the goal Bielefeld had paid Schalke 04 players for, Burdenski was able to satisfy court and the German Football Association that he was not deliberately involved in the fixing of matches. However the scandal had effects on his career. Seeking match practice, he joined scandal-shaken Arminia Bielefeld in 1971, serving as their first choice in goal until Arminia Bielefeld was punished for the clubs involvement in the scandal with relegation from the Bundesliga.

=== Werder Bremen ===
Burdenski moved on, signing for Werder Bremen with the trouble to wait one more season behind their first-choice Günter Bernard for his practice. From 1973 he succeeded Bernard, staying the regular in the goal of the North German outfit until Otto Rehhagel preferred young Oliver Reck over the then veteran shot-stopper ahead of the Bundesliga title winning campaign of Werder Bremen in 1987–88.

Making three final appearances for Werder in that season, Burdenski retired from the game in 1988 after 478 Bundesliga matches. His statistics, that also read 35 matches in the 2. Bundesliga Nord (1974–1981) in his Bremen years, feature one goal which Burdenski scored with a penalty in Bremen's 2–3 Bundesliga defeat against VfB Stuttgart in September 1979.

As Dieter Burdenski's father Herbert was also manager in the Bundesliga in the 1960s and 1970s, it came to happen that Werder Bremen brought the two Burdenski's together for the season of 1975–76. Dieter Burdenski played 22 of his 34 Bundesliga matches that season under the management of his father. In February 1976 Bremen, lying in a precarious position in the bottom-half of the Bundesliga then, sacked Herbert Burdenski to replace him with Otto Rehhagel.

=== Later career ===
Initially retired, AIK of Sweden and Dutch club SBV Vitesse managed to lure the popular goalkeeper, who was awarded the honorary captaincy of Werder Bremen in 2005, out of retirement.

At Vitesse, he replaced the suspended Raimond van der Gouw in goal for three matches. He played his first match in the Eredivisie at age 39, in November 1990. This made him the oldest player to make his debut in that league, a record Burdenski holds to this day.

Burdenski played in one match for AIK in Allsvenskan (he had been in touch with the Swedish club due to him knowing AIK's Sanny Åslund after Åslund had been his teammate at Bremen in the 1975–76) and three games for Vitesse in the Dutch Eredivisie respectively.

On 23 February 2002, the then 51-year-old made a single appearance for SV Werder Bremen II in the third German division after injuries had seen the reserves ending up short of goalkeepers. Burdenski conceded three that afternoon with SV Werder Bremen II beaten 3–1 by league rivals Chemnitzer FC.

== International career ==
Looking for decent goalkeepers to someday succeed ageing Sepp Maier in the West Germany goal, Helmut Schön turned his attention to the Werder Bremen man in 1977, handing Burdenski his first of altogether 12 caps in a friendly in Montevideo against Uruguay. He was taken with the squad to Argentina to be a benchwarmer at the 1978 FIFA World Cup, playing three times in the 1980 UEFA European Championship qualifiers (but missing out on making the 1980 UEFA European Championship squad of the West Germans), and was doing the same job on the substitution bench at the 1984 UEFA European Championship. Before that tournament he enjoyed his final appearance for his country, coming on at half-time in a friendly against Italy in Zürich on 22 May 1984.

== Style of play ==
At the height of 1.81 m, as goalkeeper, Burdenski was an athletic and has stopped lots of shots due to his reaction speed and athleticism. He was also known for his leadership qualities, he was captain of Werder Bremen many times during his long career.

== Coaching career ==
In 1997, Burdenski was re-signed by Werder Bremen for their coaching staff, working with the goalkeepers of the club until December 2005.

== Career statistics ==
=== Club ===
Appearances and goals by club, season and competition
Club	Season	League			DFB-Pokal		Continental		Europe		Total	
Club	Season	Division	Apps	Goals	Apps	Goals	Apps	Goals	Apps	Goals	Apps	Goals
Schalke 04	1970–71	Bundesliga	3	0	3	0	–		–		6	0
Arminia Bielefeld	1971–72	Bundesliga	31	0	2	0	–		–		33	0
Werder Bremen	1972–73	Bundesliga	4	0	2	0	–		3 (Note: Appearances in DFB-Ligapokal)	0	9	0
Werder Bremen	1973–74	Bundesliga	34	0	3	0	–		–		37	0
Werder Bremen	1974–75	Bundesliga	34	0	6	0	–		–		40	0
Werder Bremen	1975–76	Bundesliga	34	0	1	0	–		–		35	0
Werder Bremen	1976–77	Bundesliga	34	0	4	0	–		–		38	0
Werder Bremen	1977–78	Bundesliga	33	0	6	0	–		–		39	0
Werder Bremen	1978–79	Bundesliga	34	0	2	0	–		–		36	0
Werder Bremen	1979–70	Bundesliga	34	1	2	0	–		–		36	1
Werder Bremen	1980–81	2. Bundesliga Nord	35	0	4	0	–		–		39	0
Werder Bremen	1981–82	Bundesliga	33	0	5	0	–		–		38	0
Werder Bremen	1982–83	Bundesliga	34	0	2	0	6	0	–		42	0
Werder Bremen	1983–84	Bundesliga	34	0	5	0	4	0	–		43	0
Werder Bremen	1984–85	Bundesliga	34	0	4	0	2	0	–		40	0
Werder Bremen	1985–86	Bundesliga	31	0	3	0	2	0	–		36	0
Werder Bremen	1986–87	Bundesliga	34	0	1	0	2	0	–		37	0
Werder Bremen	1987–88	Bundesliga	3	0	0	0	–		–		3	0
Werder Bremen	Total		479	1	50	0	16	0	3	0	548	1
AIK	1988	Allsvenskan	1	0	0	0	–		–		1	0
Vitesse Arnhem	1990–91	Eredivisie	3	0	0	0	–		–		3	0
Werder Bremen II	2001–02	Regionalliga Nord	1	0	–		–		–		1	0
Career total			518	1	55	0	16	0	3	0	592	1
