= Tomáš Zahradníček =

Czech footballer

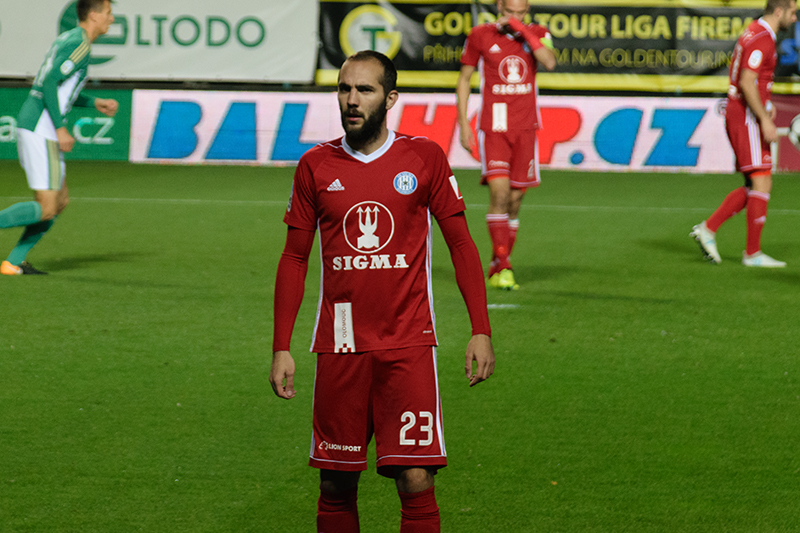

Personal information
- Date of birth: 11 August 1993 (age 33)
- Place of birth: Czech Republic
- Position: Midfielder

Team information
- Current team: SK Sigma Olomouc
- Number: 22

Senior career*
| Years | Team | Apps | (Gls) |
| 2013– | SK Sigma Olomouc | 149 | (10) |

International career^{‡}
| 2011 | Czech Republic U19 | 5 | (0) |
| 2014– | Czech Republic U21 | 1 | (0) |
- * Club domestic league appearances and goals as of 2 February 2021 ‡ National team caps and goals as of 30 January 2015

Tomáš Zahradníček (born 11 August 1993) is a professional Czech football player who currently plays for SK Sigma Olomouc.
