= Patryk Fryc =

Polish footballer (born 1993)

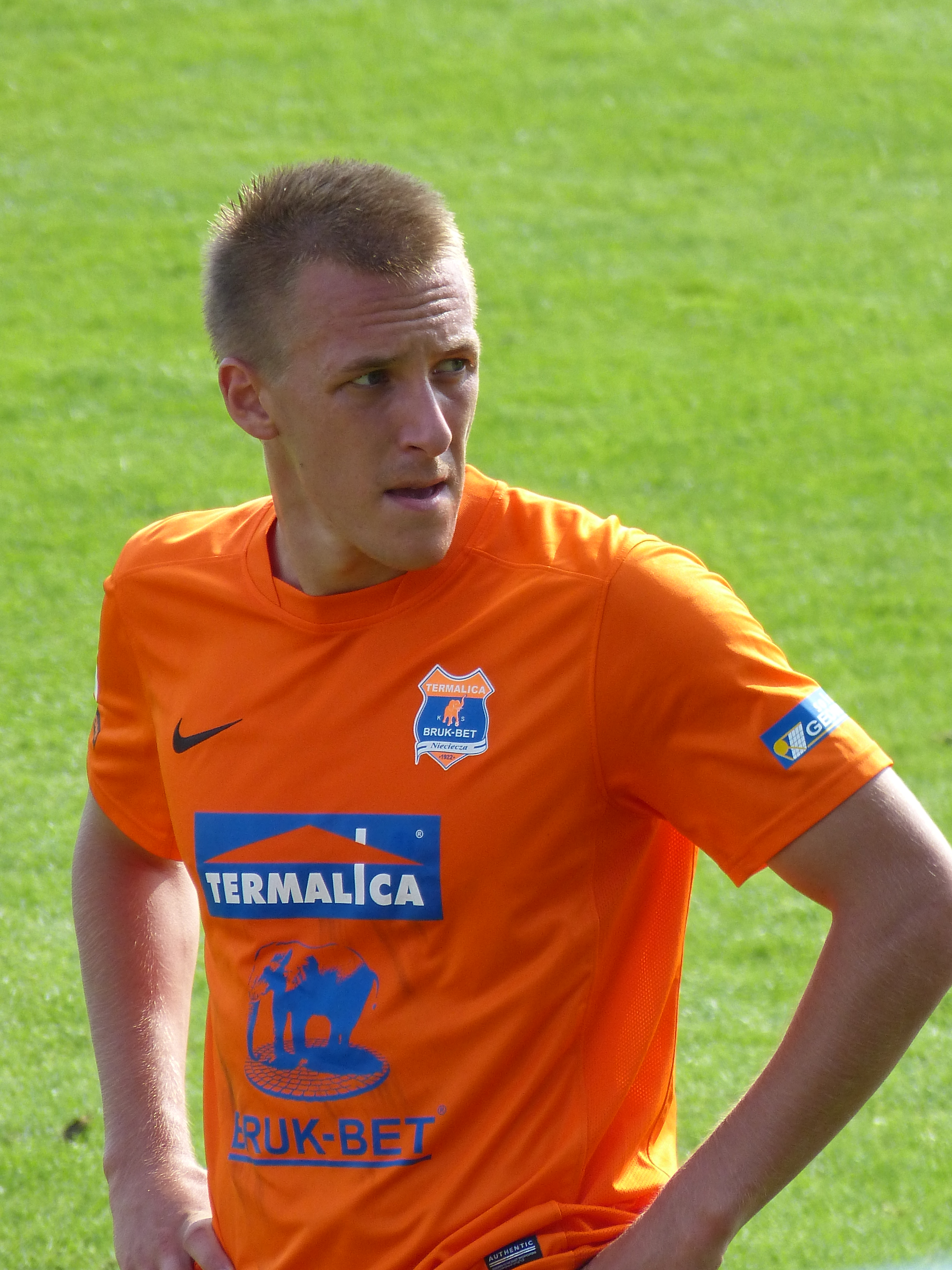
- Fryc with Termalica Nieciecza in 2014

Personal information
- Full name: Patryk Fryc
- Date of birth: 24 February 1993 (age 33)
- Place of birth: Kolbuszowa, Poland
- Height: 1.76 m (5 ft 9 1/2 in)
- Position: Right-back

Team information
- Current team: Wisłok Wiśniowa (player-assistant)
- Number: 70

Youth career
- Kolbuszowianka
- Wilga Widełka
- Stal Mielec

Senior career*
| Years | Team | Apps | (Gls) |
| 2010 | Stal Mielec | | |
| 2011 | Partyzant Targowiska | 25 | (0) |
| 2012–2013 | Flota Świnoujście | 40 | (1) |
| 2013 | Wisła Kraków | 3 | (0) |
| 2014–2018 | Termalica Nieciecza | 102 | (0) |
| 2018–2019 | Puszcza Niepołomice | 27 | (0) |
| 2019 | Olimpia Grudziądz | 7 | (0) |
| 2019 | Sokół Sieniawa | 9 | (0) |
| 2020 | Bieszczady Ustrzyki Dolne | 0 | (0) |
| 2020–2021 | Kotwica Korczyna | 17 | (3) |
| 2021–2023 | Czarni 1910 Jasło | 54 | (14) |
| 2023–2024 | Wiki Sanok | 39 | (8) |
| 2024–2025 | Partyzant Targowiska | 27 | (2) |
| 2025– | Wisłok Wiśniowa | 17 | (1) |

International career
- Poland U17
- Poland U18
- Poland U19
| 2013–2014 | Poland U20 | 6 | (0) |
- * Club domestic league appearances and goals as of 23:55, 1 February 2026 (UTC)

Patryk Fryc (born 24 February 1993) is a Polish professional footballer who plays as a right-back for IV liga Subcarpathia club Wisłok Wiśniowa, where he also serves as an assistant coach.

== Career ==
In January 2020, Fryc joined MKS Arłamów Ustrzyki Dolne.

== Honours ==
Wiki Sanok

- Klasa A Krosno I: 2022–23

Partyzant Targowiska

- Regional league Krosno: 2024–25
