= Herbert Burdenski =

German football player and manager (1922–2001)

Personal information
- Date of birth: 19 May 1922
- Place of birth: Gelsenkirchen, Germany
- Date of death: 15 September 2001 (aged 79)
- Position: Midfielder

Senior career*
Years	Team	Apps	(Gls)
1934–1935	SV Erle 08		
1935–1943	Schalke 04		
1943–1944	VfB Königsberg		
1944–1945	Eintracht Braunschweig		
1945–1946	SV Erle 08		
1946	TSV Braunschweig		
1947	SSV Buer		
1947–1949	Schalke 04		
1949–1954	Werder Bremen		

International career
1941–1951	Germany	5	(2)

Managerial career
- 1963–1964: STV Horst-Emscher
- 1969–1971: Rot-Weiß Essen
- 1972: Borussia Dortmund
- 1975–1976: Werder Bremen
- 1976: SG Union Solingen
- 1976–1978: Wuppertaler SV
- 1978–1979: Rot-Weiß Lüdenscheid
- * Club domestic league appearances and goals

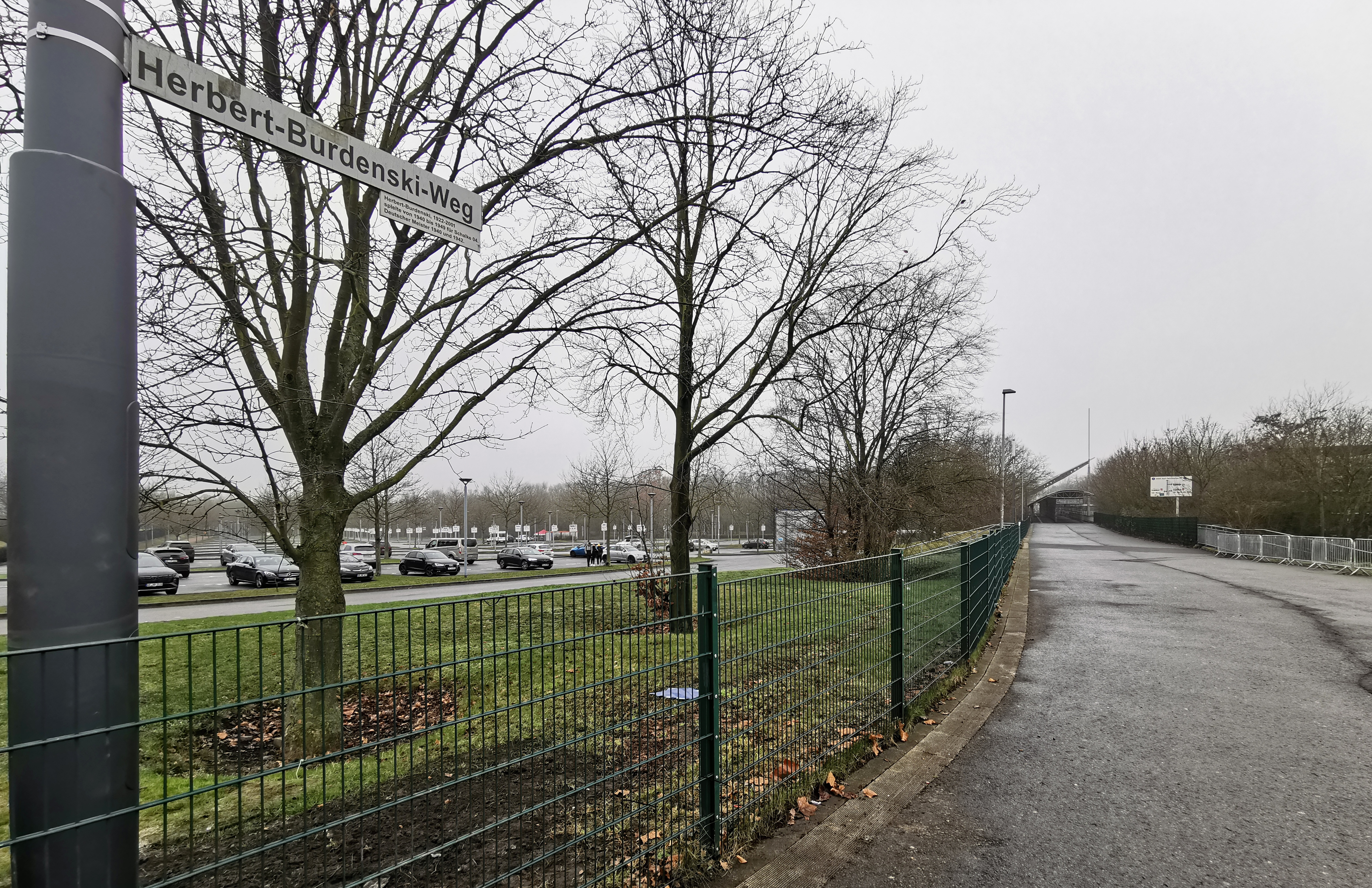
Herbert Burdenski Way.

Herbert "Budde" Burdenski (19 May 1922 – 15 September 2001), was a German football player and coach.

== Biography ==
Burdenski began his football career with the Erle 08 in Gelsenkirchen. In 1935 he was discovered playing in the local school championships by Ernst Kuzorra, who signed him to FC Schalke 04. There he became part of the Schalke team, winning the 1940 and 1942 German championship.

In 1949 Burdenski was a sports teacher in Bremen, and when the German championship returned he signed to play for Werder Bremen. It was during this time that he scored the only goal in a match against Switzerland in Stuttgart on 22 November 1950, the first international match of the West Germany national football team after the Second World War. Burdenski played five games for the national team during this second phase of his career.

After retiring from playing, Burdenski became a coach for: Rot-Weiß Essen, Borussia Dortmund, SV Werder Bremen, MSV Duisburg, STV Horst-Emscher, Wuppertaler SV, and Westfalia Herne. Essen and Dortmund were relegated from the Bundesliga under his reign.

Up to his death, Burdenski remained connected to FC Schalke, mainly to advise the supervisory board and presidency.

=== Personal life ===
Burdenski is the father of the successful Bundesliga player Dieter Burdenski. As a manager in Bundesliga in the 1960s and 1970s, it came to happen that SV Werder Bremen brought the two Burdenski's together for the season of 1975–76. Dieter Burdenski played 22 of his 34 Bundesliga matches that season under the management of his father. In February 1976, Werder, lying in a precarious position in the bottom-half of Bundesliga then, sacked Herbert to replace him with Otto Rehhagel.
