= 2003–04 Ekstraklasa =

78th season of top-tier football league in Poland

Liga
- Season: 2003–04
- Champions: Wisła Kraków; 10th Ekstraklasa title 9th Polish title
- Relegated: Górnik Polkowice; Lukullus Świt Nowy Dwór Mazowiecki; Widzew Łódź
- Top goalscorer: Maciej Żurawski (20 goals)
- Average attendance: 5,492 ▲6.8%

The 2003–04 Ekstraklasa is the 78th season of the Polish Football Championship and the 70th season of the Ekstraklasa, the top Polish professional league for association football clubs, since its establishment in 1927.

== Overview ==
14 teams competed in the 2003-04 season. Wisła Kraków won the championship.

== League table ==
Pos	Team	Pld	W	D	L	GF	GA	GD	Pts	Qualification or relegation
1	Wisła Kraków (C)	26	21	2	3	73	30	+43	65	Qualification to Champions League second qualifying round
2	Legia Warsaw	26	18	6	2	56	19	+37	60	Qualification to UEFA Cup second qualifying round
3	Amica Wronki	26	14	6	6	47	25	+22	48	Qualification to UEFA Cup second qualifying round
4	Dyskobolia Grodzisk Wielkopolski	26	13	7	6	59	31	+28	46	
5	Wisła Płock	26	10	8	8	41	39	+2	38	
6	Lech Poznań	26	10	7	9	43	34	+9	37	Qualification to UEFA Cup second qualifying round
7	Górnik Zabrze	26	8	9	9	26	33	−7	33	
8	Górnik Łęczna	26	10	3	13	22	38	−16	33	
9	Odra Wodzisław	26	8	4	14	27	40	−13	28	Qualification to Intertoto Cup first round
10	Dospel Katowice	26	6	8	12	20	42	−22	26	
11	Polonia Warsaw	26	6	7	13	25	40	−15	25	
12	Górnik Polkowice (R)	26	6	5	15	17	37	−20	23	Qualification to relegation playoffs
13	Świt Nowy Dwór Mazowiecki (R)	26	5	7	14	21	42	−21	22	Relegated to II liga
14	Widzew Łódź (R)	26	4	7	15	25	52	−27	19	Relegated to II liga

Source: 90minut.pl (in Polish)
(C) Champions; (R) Relegated

== Results ==
Home \ Away	AMC	ŚWI	KAT	GKŁ	GPK	GÓR	DSK	LPO	LEG	ODR	PWA	WID	WIS	WPK
Amica Wronki		2–2	4–0	3–2	3–0	2–0	1–0	1–0	0–1	2–1	2–0	6–0	2–0	3–2
Świt Nowy Dwór Mazowiecki	0–1		2–1	1–0	0–0	0–0	0–4	1–0	1–3	3–1	2–1	0–0	1–2	1–2
GKS Katowice	0–0	0–0		1–1	1–0	0–0	0–4	1–2	2–4	2–0	1–1	2–0	0–2	2–0
Górnik Łęczna	1–0	1–0	4–1		1–0	0–2	1–0	1–2	0–3	0–1	2–1	2–1	0–1	3–1
Górnik Polkowice	1–0	1–0	0–0	2–0		3–1	0–3	0–2	0–0	3–3	0–0	2–3	0–2	1–2
Górnik Zabrze	1–2	1–0	1–1	0–1	1–0		2–2	0–0	2–2	3–1	1–0	3–3	0–4	1–1
Dyskobolia	1–1	3–1	6–0	4–0	4–1	0–0		2–4	2–2	4–0	2–2	2–0	1–6	2–2
Lech Poznań	0–0	5–1	1–2	5–1	1–0	1–2	1–3		0–2	2–0	1–0	1–2	2–2	4–1
Legia Warsaw	3–1	3–1	1–0	0–0	3–0	2–0	1–1	2–1		2–1	7–2	6–0	4–1	2–0
Odra Wodzisław	2–2	2–2	1–0	2–0	0–1	1–2	0–2	2–0	1–1		1–0	1–0	3–2	1–2
Polonia Warsaw	1–5	1–0	1–0	3–0	0–1	2–0	3–1	1–1	0–1	1–0		2–1	2–5	0–0
Widzew Łódź	2–2	2–2	1–2	0–1	2–0	1–2	0–1	1–1	0–1	0–1	1–1		1–3	2–1
Wisła Kraków	2–1	4–0	5–0	4–0	2–1	2–0	3–2	4–2	1–0	2–1	4–1	3–1		3–1
Wisła Płock	3–1	2–0	1–1	0–0	3–0	2–1	0–1	4–4	2–1	2–0	0–0	3–1	4–4	

Source: 90minut.pl (in Polish)
Legend: Blue = home team win; Yellow = draw; Red = away team win.

== Relegation playoffs ==
The matches were played on 19 and 26 June 2004.

Team 1	Agg.	Team 2	1st leg	2nd leg
KS Cracovia	8–0	Górnik Polkowice	4–0	4–0

== Top goalscorers ==
Rank	Player	Club	Goals
1	(Poland) Maciej Żurawski	Wisła Kraków	20
2	(Poland) Ireneusz Jeleń	Wisła Płock	18
3	(Poland) Marek Saganowski	Legia Warsaw	17
4	(Poland) Piotr Włodarczyk	Widzew Łódź / Legia Warsaw	16
5	(Poland) Tomasz Frankowski	Wisła Kraków	15
6	(Poland) Piotr Reiss	Lech Poznań	13
7	(Poland) Paweł Kryszałowicz	Amica Wronki	11
8	(Poland) Grzegorz Rasiak	Dyskobolia Grodzisk	10
8	(Poland) Adrian Sikora	Górnik Zabrze / Dyskobolia Grodzisk	10
10	(Serbia and Montenegro) Stanko Svitlica	Legia Warsaw	9

== Attendances ==
Club	Average
Lech Poznań	14,846
Legia Warszawa	10,962
Wisła Kraków	9,115
Górnik Łęczna	5,846
Widzew Łódź	5,154
Wisła Płock	4,731
Górnik Zabrze	3,969
Polonia Warszawa	3,654
Dyskobolia	3,562
GKS Katowice	3,308
Odra Wodzisław Śląski	3,300
Polkowice	3,231
Świt Nowy Dwór Mazowiecki	2,731
Amica Wronki	2,477
