= 2004–05 Ekstraklasa =

79th season of top-tier football league in Poland

Idea Ekstraklasa
- Season: 2004–05
- Champions: Wisła Kraków; 11th Ekstraklasa title 10th Polish title
- Relegated: GKS Katowice
- Matches: 186
- Goals: 498 (2.68 per match)
- Top goalscorer: Tomasz Frankowski (25 goals)
- Average attendance: 5,230 ▼4.8%

The 2004–05 Ekstraklasa is the 79th season of the Polish Football Championship and the 71st season of the Ekstraklasa, the top Polish professional league for association football clubs, since its establishment in 1927.

== Overview ==
14 teams competed in the 2004-05 season. Wisła Kraków won the championship.

== League table ==
Pos	Team	Pld	W	D	L	GF	GA	GD	Pts	Qualification or relegation
1	Wisła Kraków (C)	26	19	5	2	70	23	+47	62	Qualification to Champions League third qualifying round
2	Dyskobolia Grodzisk Wielkopolski	26	16	3	7	46	28	+18	51	Qualification to UEFA Cup second qualifying round
3	Legia Warsaw	26	13	8	5	42	19	+23	47	Qualification to UEFA Cup second qualifying round
4	Wisła Płock	26	12	5	9	35	30	+5	41	Qualification to UEFA Cup second qualifying round
5	KS Cracovia	26	12	4	10	37	29	+8	40	
6	Amica Wronki	26	10	8	8	29	28	+1	38	
7	Górnik Łęczna	26	10	6	10	36	36	0	36	
8	Lech Poznań	26	10	4	12	34	40	−6	34	Qualification to Intertoto Cup first round
9	Pogoń Szczecin	26	7	10	9	34	43	−9	31	Qualification to Intertoto Cup first round
10	Polonia Warsaw	26	8	5	13	27	52	−25	29	
11	Górnik Zabrze	26	7	7	12	27	30	−3	28	
12	Zagłębie Lubin	26	6	10	10	31	41	−10	28	
13	Odra Wodzisław (O)	26	7	3	16	27	41	−14	24	Qualification to relegation playoffs
14	GKS Katowice (R)	26	4	4	18	23	58	−35	16	Relegated to II liga

Source: 90minut.pl (in Polish)
(C) Champions; (O) Play-off winners; (R) Relegated

== Results ==
Home \ Away	AMC	CRA	KAT	GKŁ	GÓR	DSK	LPO	LEG	ODR	PWA	POG	WIS	WPK	ZLU
Amica Wronki		3–2	1–0	1–0	1–1	1–3	1–0	1–1	2–2	1–0	0–0	0–1	2–1	0–2
Cracovia	0–1		2–0	0–0	0–0	2–0	2–0	1–0	2–3	2–1	4–2	0–1	4–0	1–0
GKS Katowice	1–4	1–0		4–0	1–0	1–3	0–3	0–3	0–3 (Note: Match was interrupted at 90 minutes by GKS fans at result 1–1. PZPN punished GKS and verified the result as 0–3.)	2–3	1–1	0–3	0–0	2–0
Górnik Łęczna	1–0	3–1	4–2		2–0	2–1	2–0	1–2	1–2	1–1	1–1	2–2	3–2	2–1
Górnik Zabrze	1–1	1–0	4–1	0–3		0–1	1–2	0–0	2–0	0–1	4–0	1–3	1–0	1–1
Dyskobolia	4–0	3–1	3–2	0–0	3–1		1–0	3–2	1–0	5–0	2–0	2–4	1–2	3–1
Lech Poznań	0–4	0–2	3–1	3–0	2–1	2–2		1–1	1–0	1–1	1–1 (Note: The match was stopped at 39 minutes when false information about Pope John Paul II's death was given. After three weeks, resumed at 39 min.)	3–1	4–2	2–0
Legia Warsaw	1–1	2–1	2–0	1–1	2–1	0–1	3–0		0–1	4–1	3–0	5–1	2–1	0–0
Odra Wodzisław	1–2	0–1	2–2	0–5	1–2	1–2	3–1	0–1		2–1	1–0	1–2	0–1	1–2
Polonia Warsaw	1–0	2–3	2–0	1–0	2–1	1–0	0–2	0–5	1–0		3–3	1–3	1–4	1–1
Pogoń Szczecin	1–0	1–1	4–2	2–1	0–2	1–0	3–1	1–2	4–1	1–1		0–5	2–0	1–1
Wisła Kraków	1–1	0–0	1–0	5–1	2–1	3–0	4–1	2–0	3–1	4–0	1–1		4–0	6–0
Wisła Płock	2–0	3–0	0–0	3–0	0–0	0–1	2–1	0–0	1–0	4–1	3–2	1–1		2–0
Zagłębie Lubin	1–1	2–5	7–0	1–0	1–1	1–1	2–0	0–0	1–1	3–0	2–2	1–7	0–1	

Source: 90minut.pl (in Polish)
Legend: Blue = home team win; Yellow = draw; Red = away team win.

== Relegation playoffs ==
The matches were played on 16 and 19 June 2005.

Team 1	Agg.	Team 2	1st leg	2nd leg
Widzew Łódź	2–3	Odra Wodzisław	1–3	1–0

== Top goalscorers ==
Rank	Player	Club	Goals
1	(Poland) Tomasz Frankowski	Wisła Kraków	25
2	(Poland) Maciej Żurawski	Wisła Kraków	24
3	(Poland) Marek Saganowski	Legia Warsaw	14
4	(Poland) Piotr Bania	Cracovia	12
4	(Poland) Ireneusz Jeleń	Wisła Płock	12
6	(Poland) Bartosz Ślusarski	Dyskobolia Grodzisk	10
7	(Poland) Michał Chałbiński	Górnik Zabrze	9
7	(Poland) Jacek Dembiński	Amica Wronki	9
7	(Poland) Piotr Reiss	Lech Poznań	9
7	(Poland) Sebastian Szałachowski	Górnik Łęczna	9
7	(Poland) Piotr Włodarczyk	Legia Warsaw	9

== Attendances ==
Club	Average
Pogoń Szczecin	9,846
Wisła Kraków	9,615
Lech Poznań	8,577
Legia Warszawa	7,423
Cracovia	6,323
Górnik Łęczna	5,038
Wisła Płock	4,385
Zagłębie Lubin	4,115
GKS Katowice	3,393
Górnik Zabrze	3,385
Polonia Warszawa	3,100
Dyskobolia	3,077
Amica Wronki	2,600
Odra Wodzisław Śląski	2,338
