= 2020–21 Podbeskidzie Bielsko-Biała season =

Podbeskidzie Bielsko-Biała
2020-21 season
- Chairman: Bogdan Kłys
- Manager: Krzysztof Brede (sacked) → Robert Kasperczyk
- Stadium: Stadion Miejski, Bielsko-Biała
- Ekstraklasa: 16th of 16 (relegated)
- Polish Cup: Round of 32
Home colours	Away colours	Third colours

In the 2020–21 season, Podbeskidzie Bielsko-Biała competed in Ekstraklasa. In addition, they competed in the season's Polish Cup edition, where they were eliminated by Zagłębie Lubin, following the 2–4 defeat in the round of 32.

== Players ==
As of 6 October 2020

Note: Flags indicate national team as defined under FIFA eligibility rules; some limited exceptions apply. Players may hold more than one non-FIFA nationality.

No.	Pos.	Nation	Player
1	GK	(Slovakia) SVK	Martin Polaček
2	DF	(Poland) POL	Filip Modelski
3	DF	(Poland) POL	Aleksander Komor
4	DF	(Serbia) SRB	Milan Rundić
6	MF	(Poland) POL	Tomasz Nowak
7	MF	(Poland) POL	Rafał Figiel
8	MF	(Poland) POL	Karol Danielak
9	FW	(Poland) POL	Kamil Biliński
10	MF	(Netherlands) NED	Desley Ubbink
11	MF	(Poland) POL	Łukasz Sierpina
13	GK	(Poland) POL	Rafał Leszczyński
14	FW	(Poland) POL	Filip Laskowski
15	MF	(Poland) POL	Jakub Bieroński
16	DF	(Poland) POL	Szymon Mroczko
17	MF	(Poland) POL	Mateusz Marzec

No.	Pos.	Nation	Player
19	MF	(Poland) POL	Michał Rzuchowski
20	DF	(Ukraine) UKR	Dmytro Bashlay
21	MF	(Hungary) HUN	Gergő Kocsis
22	DF	(Poland) POL	Kacper Gach
25	DF	(Poland) POL	Bartosz Jaroch
27	MF	(Poland) POL	Konrad Sieracki
28	DF	(Poland) POL	Kornel Osyra
32	FW	(Ukraine) UKR	Serhiy Myakushko
33	GK	(Poland) POL	Arkadiusz Leszczyński
42	MF	(Poland) POL	Michał Studnicki
44	MF	(Poland) POL	Dominik Frelek
50	MF	(Poland) POL	Maksymilian Sitek
77	FW	(Poland) POL	Patryk Drabik
95	FW	(Croatia) CRO	Marko Roginić
99	FW	(Spain) ESP	Iván Martín

== Competitions ==
=== Ekstraklasa ===
==== Standings ====
Pos	Team	Pld	W	D	L	GF	GA	GD	Pts	Qualification or relegation
12	Wisła Płock	30	8	9	13	37	44	−7	33 (Note: Head-to-head matches: Wisła Kraków 0–3 Wisła Płock, Wisła Płock 1–3 Wisła Kraków.)	
13	Wisła Kraków	30	8	9	13	39	42	−3	33	
14	Cracovia (Note: Cracovia was deducted 5 points for match-fixing during the 2003–04 II liga season (second tier at the time).)	30	8	13	9	28	32	−4	32	
15	Stal Mielec	30	6	11	13	31	47	−16	29	
16	Podbeskidzie Bielsko-Biała (R)	30	6	7	17	29	60	−31	25	Relegation to I liga

Source: ekstraklasa.org
Rules for classification: 1) Points; 2) Head-to-head points; 3) Head-to-head goal difference; 4) Head-to-head goals scored; 5) Head-to-head away goals scored (only if between two teams); 6) Goal difference; 7) Goals scored; 8) Number of wins; 9) Number of away wins; 10) Fairplay ranking; 11) Draw
(R) Relegated

==== Matches ====
23 August 2020 1	Górnik Zabrze	4 – 2	Podbeskidzie	Zabrze
17:30 CET	Jesús Jiménez 1' 23' (pen.) 90+1'; Krawczyk 45+1'; Hajda (yellow card) 87'	Report	Biliński (yellow card) 4' (goal) 57' 82'; Bashlay (yellow card) 22'; Michał Rzuchowski (yellow card) 48'	Stadium: Arena Zabrze; Attendance: 7,368; Referee: (Poland) Mariusz Zlotek

30 August 2020 2	Podbeskidzie	2 – 2	Cracovia	Bielsko-Biała
15:00 CET	Danielak 16'; Szymon Mroczko (yellow card) 32'; Biliński (yellow card) 55'; Komor 58'; Ubbink (yellow card) 73'	Report	Jablonský 45'; Vestenický 81'	Stadium: Stadion Miejski; Attendance: 4,308; Referee: (Poland) Jarosław Przybył

11 September 2020 3	Jagiellonia Białystok	2 – 2	Podbeskidzie	Białystok
18:00 CET	Puljić 49'; Jesús Imaz 51'	Report	Biliński 18'; Michał Rzuchowski 37'; Rafał Figiel (yellow card) 68'; Rundić (yellow card) 90'	Stadium: Stadion Miejski; Attendance: 5,065; Referee: (Poland) Szymon Marciniak

18 September 2020 4	Podbeskidzie	1 – 4	Raków Częstochowa	Bielsko-Biała
18:00 CET	Nowak 13'; Jaroch (yellow card) 45'	Report	Wilusz (yellow card) 7'; Schwarz 21' (pen.) 40' (pen.); Cebula 34'; Gutkovskis 45+1' (pen.); Petrášek (yellow card) 52'	Stadium: Stadion Miejski; Attendance: 4,397; Referee: Damian Sylwestrzak (Wrocław)

26 September 2020 5	Lechia Gdańsk	4 – 0	Podbeskidzie	Gdańsk
17:30 CET	Komor 13' (o.g.); Makowski (yellow card) 20'; Flávio Paixão 30' 42'; Kubicki (yellow card) 62'; Zwoliński 90+4'	Report	Roginić (yellow card) 34'; Biliński (yellow card) 61'; Modelski (yellow card) 81'	Stadium: Polsat Plus Arena Gdańsk; Attendance: 4,877; Referee: (Poland) Tomasz Kwiatkowski

3 October 2020 6	Podbeskidzie	1 – 0	Stal Mielec	Bielsko-Biała
15:00 CET	Biliński 32'; Gach (yellow card) 62'	Report	Tomasiewicz (yellow card) 31'	Stadium: Stadion Miejski; Attendance: 2,987; Referee: (Poland) Łukasz Szczech

19 October 2020 7	Podbeskidzie	1 – 2	Warta Poznań	Bielsko-Biała
18:00 CET	Filip Laskowski (yellow card) 50'; Maksymilian Sitek 58'; Iván Martín (yellow card) 90+3'	Report	Kuzdra (yellow card) 22'; Kuzimski (yellow card) 30' (goal) 47'; Adrian Laskowski (yellow card) 36'; Kupczak 86'	Stadium: Stadion Miejski; Attendance: 0 Referee: (Poland) Krzysztof Jakubik
Note: COVID-19 pandemic in Poland

24 October 2020 8	Wisła Kraków	3 – 0	Podbeskidzie	Kraków
15:00 CEST (UTC+2)	Jean Carlos 35' (pen.); Forbes (yellow card) 37'; Sadlok (yellow card) 56'; Chuca 61'; Frydrych (yellow card) 81'; Błaszczykowski 90+1'	Report	Sitek (yellow card) 32'; Kocsis (yellow card) 34'; Komor (red card) 72'	Stadium: Stadion Miejski; Attendance: 0 Referee: Paweł Gil (Lublin)
Note: COVID-19 pandemic in Poland

9 November 2020 10	Pogoń Szczecin	1 – 1	Podbeskidzie	Szczecin
18:00 CEST (UTC+2)	Kozłowski (yellow card) 45'; Benedyczak 72'; Gorgon (yellow card) 87'	Report	Biliński 29'; Sierpina (yellow card) 50'; Nowak (yellow card) 55'; Gach (yellow card) 76'	Stadium: Stadion Miejski im. Floriana Krygiera; Attendance: 0 Referee: (Poland) Jarosław Przybył
Note: COVID-19 pandemic in Poland

24 November 2020 9	Podbeskidzie	2 – 1	Zagłębie Lubin	Bielsko-Biała
18:00 CET (UTC+1)	Marzec 23'; Roginić (yellow card) 58'; Ubbink 74'; Komor (yellow card) 76'	Report	Guldan (yellow card) 12'; Šimić (yellow card) 46'; Sirk 71'; Dražić (yellow card) 77'	Stadium: Stadion Miejski; Attendance: 0 Referee: (Poland) Szymon Marciniak
Note: COVID-19 pandemic in Poland

28 November 2020 11	Podbeskidzie	0 – 2	Śląsk Wrocław	Bielsko-Biała
17:30 CET (UTC+1)	Roginić (yellow card) 89'; Iván Martín (yellow card) 90+3'	Report	Pich 4'; Celeban (yellow card) 55'; Zylla 66' (yellow card) 66'; Musonda (yellow card) 73'	Stadium: Stadion Miejski; Attendance: 0 Referee: (Poland) Dominik Sulikowski
Note: COVID-19 pandemic in Poland

6 December 2020 12	Lech Poznań	4 – 0	Podbeskidzie	Poznań
17:30 CET (UTC+01:00)	Rogne 31'; Ishak 44'; Tiba 47'; Ramírez 53'	Ekstraklasa; 90minut		Stadium: Stadion Miejski; Attendance: 0 Referee: Wojciech Myć (Lublin)
Note: COVID-19 pandemic in Poland

31 January 2021 15	Podbeskidzie	1 – 0	Legia Warsaw	Bielsko-Biała, Poland
17:30 CEST (UTC+2)	Janicki 48'	Report		Stadium: Stadion Miejski; Attendance: 0 Referee: Szymon Marciniak (Płock)
Note: COVID-19 pandemic in Poland

=== Polish Cup ===
15 August 2020 Round of 64	Stal Rzeszów	0–1	Podbeskidzie Bielsko-Biała	Rzeszów
16:00 CEST (UTC+02:00)		Łączy nas piłka 90minut	Danielak 33'	Stadium: Stadion Miejski; Attendance: 921; Referee: Jacek Małyszek (Lublin)

1 December 2020 Round of 32	Podbeskidzie Bielsko-Biała	2–4 (a.e.t.)	Zagłębie Lubin	Bielsko-Biała
17:40 CET (UTC+01:00)	Myakushko 63' (pen.), 102' (pen.)	Łączy nas piłka 90minut	Dražić 78' (pen.), 112' (pen.); Šimić 94'; Mráz 106'	Stadium: Stadion Miejski; Attendance: 0 Referee: Mariusz Złotek (Stalowa Wola)
Note: Match originally scheduled on 29 October 2020, 17:00 CET (UTC+01:00) was postponed due to COVID-19 disease detection in Zagłębie Lubin team.
