= 2015–16 Ekstraklasa =

90th season of top-tier football league in Poland

Ekstraklasa
- Season: 2015–16
- Champions: Legia Warsaw (11th title)
- Relegated: Górnik Zabrze; Podbeskidzie
- Champions League: Legia Warsaw
- Europa League: Piast Gliwice; Zagłębie Lubin; Cracovia
- Matches: 296
- Goals: 778 (2.63 per match)
- Top goalscorer: Nemanja Nikolić (28 goals)
- Biggest home win: Legia 5–0 Podbeskidzie (26 July 2015); Lechia 5–0 Podbeskidzie (13 February 2016)
- Biggest away win: Podbeskidzie 0–6 Wisła (19 September 2015)
- Highest scoring: Termalica 3–5 Piast (20 November 2015)
- Longest winning run: 6 matches Lech Poznań
- Longest unbeaten run: 12 matches Pogoń Szczecin
- Longest winless run: 11 matches Śląsk Wrocław; Wisła Kraków
- Longest losing run: 6 matches Wisła Kraków
- Highest attendance: 41,567; Lech 0–2 Legia (19 March 2016)
- Lowest attendance: 0 Zagłębie 0–2 Jagiellonia (1 December 2015)
- Total attendance: 2,694,673
- Average attendance: 9,104 ▲9.4%

The 2015–16 Ekstraklasa was the 82nd season of the highest level of football leagues in Poland since its establishment in 1927. A total of 16 teams were participating, 14 of which competed in the league during the 2014–15 season, while the remaining two were promoted from the I Liga. Each team played a total of 37 matches, half at home and half away.

Lech Poznań were the defending champions, having won their 7th title last season.

== Teams ==
Promotion and relegation as usual was determined by the position in the table from prior season. The bottom two teams were directly relegated to the I Liga, while the top two teams are promoted to the Ekstraklasa.

Zawisza Bydgoszcz and GKS Bełchatów finished in 15th and 16th place, respectively, and were relegated to the I Liga as a result. Zagłębie Lubin, the 2014–15 I Liga champion, returns to the top level just one year after their relegation. Runners-up Termalica Bruk-Bet Nieciecza was promoted to the Ekstraklasa for the first time.

=== Stadium and locations ===
Location of teams in 2015–16 Ekstraklasa
Location of teams in the Katowice urban area

Team	Location	Venue	Capacity
Cracovia	Kraków	Stadion im. Józefa Piłsudskiego	15,016
Górnik Łęczna	Łęczna	Stadion Górnika Łęczna	7,226
Górnik Zabrze	Zabrze	Arena Zabrze	24,413
Jagiellonia Białystok	Białystok	Stadion Jagiellonii	22,386
Korona Kielce	Kielce	Kolporter Arena	15,550
Lech Poznań	Poznań	INEA Stadion	41,609
Lechia Gdańsk	Gdańsk	Stadion Energa Gdańsk	42,105
Legia Warsaw	Warsaw	Stadion Wojska Polskiego	31,103
Piast Gliwice	Gliwice	Arena Gliwice	10,037
Podbeskidzie Bielsko-Biała	Bielsko-Biała	Stadion BBOSiR	15,292
Pogoń Szczecin	Szczecin	Stadion im. Floriana Krygiera	18,027
Ruch Chorzów	Chorzów	Stadion Ruchu Chorzów	9,300
Śląsk Wrocław	Wrocław	Stadion Wrocław	42,771
Termalica Bruk-Bet Nieciecza	Nieciecza	Stadion Bruk-Bet^{1}	5,200
Wisła Kraków	Kraków	Stadion im. Henryka Reymana	33,130
Zagłębie Lubin	Lubin	Stadion Zagłębia Lubin	16,068

1. Termalica played 7 first home games at Stadion MOSiR (cap. 6,864) in Mielec.

Cracovia	Górnik Łęczna	Górnik Zabrze	Jagiellonia	Korona	Lech
Stadion im. Marszałka Józefa Piłsudskiego	Stadion Górnika Łęczna	Arena Zabrze	Stadion Jagiellonii	Kolporter Arena	INEA Stadion
Capacity: 15,016	Capacity: 7,226	Capacity: 24,413	Capacity: 22,386	Capacity: 15,550	Capacity: 41,609
Lechia	Legia	Piast	Podbeskidzie	Pogoń	Ruch
Stadion Energa Gdańsk	Stadion Wojska Polskiego	Arena Gliwice	Stadion BBOSiR	Stadion im. Floriana Krygiera	Stadion Ruchu Chorzów
Capacity: 42,105	Capacity: 31,103	Capacity: 10,037	Capacity: 15,292	Capacity: 18,027	Capacity: 9,300
	Śląsk	Termalica	Wisła	Zagłębie	
	Stadion Wrocław	Stadion Bruk-Bet	Stadion im. Henryka Reymana	Stadion Zagłębia Lubin	
	Capacity: 42,771	Capacity: 4,595	Capacity: 33,130	Capacity: 16,068	

=== Personnel and kits ===
Team	Chairman	Head coach	Captain	Manufacturer	Sponsors
Cracovia	(Poland) Janusz Filipiak	(Poland) Jacek Zieliński	(Poland) Piotr Polczak	Legea	Comarch
Górnik Łęczna	(Poland) Artur Kapelko	(Poland) Andrzej Rybarski	(Serbia) Veljko Nikitović	Jako	Lubelski Węgiel Bogdanka
Górnik Zabrze	(Poland) Marek Pałus	(Poland) Jan Żurek	(Poland) Adam Danch	adidas	Łomża
Jagiellonia Białystok	(Poland) Cezary Kulesza	(Poland) Michał Probierz	(Poland) Rafał Grzyb	Errea	STAG SA, Wschodzący Białystok
Korona Kielce	(Poland) Marek Paprocki	(Poland) Marcin Brosz	(Poland) Kamil Sylwestrzak	hummel	Lewiatan
Lech Poznań	(Poland) Karol Klimczak	(Poland) Jan Urban	(Poland) Łukasz Trałka	Nike	STS
Lechia Gdańsk	(Poland) Adam Mandziara	(Poland) Piotr Nowak	(Poland) Sebastian Mila	Saller	Lotos
Legia Warsaw	(Poland) Bogusław Leśnodorski	(Russia) Stanislav Cherchesov	(Croatia) Ivica Vrdoljak	adidas	Fortuna
Piast Gliwice	(Poland) Adam Sarkowicz	(Czech Republic) Radoslav Látal	(Poland) Radosław Murawski	adidas	Miasto Gliwice, Kar-Tel, E-Toto
Podbeskidzie Bielsko-Biała	(Poland) Tomasz Mikołajko	(Poland) Robert Podoliński	(Poland) Marek Sokołowski	Masita	murapol.pl
Pogoń Szczecin	(Poland) Jarosław Mroczek	(Poland) Czesław Michniewicz	(Poland) Rafał Murawski	Nike	Grupa Azoty, Miasto Szczecin
Ruch Chorzów	(Poland) Dariusz Smagorowicz	(Poland) Waldemar Fornalik	(Poland) Rafał Grodzicki	adidas	Węglokoks
Śląsk Wrocław	(Poland) Paweł Żelem	(Poland) Mariusz Rumak	(Poland) Piotr Celeban	adidas	
Termalica Bruk-Bet Nieciecza	(Poland) Danuta Witkowska	(Poland) Piotr Mandrysz	(Poland) Jakub Biskup	Nike	Bruk-Bet
Wisła Kraków	(Poland) Piotr Dunin-Suligostowski	(Poland) Dariusz Wdowczyk	(Poland) Arkadiusz Głowacki	adidas	Tele-Fonika
Zagłębie Lubin	(Poland) Tomasz Dębicki	(Poland) Piotr Stokowiec	(Poland) Konrad Forenc	Nike	KGHM

=== Managerial changes ===
Team	Outgoing manager	Manner of departure	Date of vacancy	Position in table	Incoming manager	Date of appointment
Korona Kielce	(Poland) Ryszard Tarasiewicz	End of contract	30 June 2015	Pre-season	(Poland) Marcin Brosz	25 June 2015
Górnik Zabrze	(Poland) Józef Dankowski	End of contract	30 June 2015	Pre-season	(Poland) Robert Warzycha	16 July 2015
Górnik Zabrze	(Poland) Robert Warzycha	Sacked	13 August 2015	16th	(Poland) Leszek Ojrzyński	13 August 2015
Lechia Gdańsk	(Poland) Jerzy Brzęczek	Sacked	1 September 2015	12th	(Germany) Thomas von Heesen	1 September 2015
Podbeskidzie Bielsko-Biała	(Poland) Dariusz Kubicki	Sacked	19 September 2015	14th	(Poland) Robert Podoliński	20 September 2015
Legia Warsaw	(Norway) Henning Berg	Sacked	4 October 2015	4th	(Russia) Stanislav Cherchesov	6 October 2015
Lech Poznań	(Poland) Maciej Skorża	Sacked	12 October 2015	16th	(Poland) Jan Urban	12 October 2015
Wisła Kraków	(Poland) Kazimierz Moskal	Sacked	30 November 2015	7th	(Poland) Marcin Broniszewski (interim)	30 November 2015
Lechia Gdańsk	(Germany) Thomas von Heesen	Sacked	3 December 2015	14th	(Poland) Dawid Banaczek (interim)	4 December 2015
Śląsk Wrocław	(Poland) Tadeusz Pawłowski	Sacked	7 December 2015	16th	(Poland) Romuald Szukiełowicz	7 December 2015
Wisła Kraków	(Poland) Marcin Broniszewski	Caretaking spell over	22 December 2015	13th	(Poland) Tadeusz Pawłowski	22 December 2015
Lechia Gdańsk	(Poland) Dawid Banaczek	Caretaking spell over	13 January 2016	10th	(Poland) Piotr Nowak	13 January 2016
Wisła Kraków	(Poland) Tadeusz Pawłowski	Leave of absence	29 February 2016	15th	(Poland) Marcin Broniszewski	29 February 2016
Górnik Zabrze	(Poland) Leszek Ojrzyński	Sacked	3 March 2016	16th	(Poland) Jan Żurek	3 March 2016
Śląsk Wrocław	(Poland) Romuald Szukiełowicz	Sacked	9 March 2016	15th	(Poland) Mariusz Rumak	9 March 2016
Wisła Kraków	(Poland) Marcin Broniszewski	Caretaking spell over	13 March 2016	15th	(Poland) Dariusz Wdowczyk	13 March 2016
Górnik Łęczna	(Russia) Yuriy Shatalov	Resigned	6 May 2016	14th	(Poland) Andrzej Rybarski (interim)	6 May 2016

== Regular season ==
=== League table ===
Pos	Team	Pld	W	D	L	GF	GA	GD	Pts	Qualification
1	Legia Warsaw	30	17	9	4	58	28	+30	60	Qualification for the championship round
2	Piast Gliwice	30	17	7	6	49	36	+13	58	Qualification for the championship round
3	Pogoń Szczecin	30	10	16	4	36	30	+6	46	Qualification for the championship round
4	Zagłębie Lubin	30	12	9	9	41	37	+4	45 (Note: Head-to-head record: Zagłębie - Cracovia 4–2, Cracovia - Zagłębie 1–2.)	Qualification for the championship round
5	Cracovia	30	12	9	9	57	42	+15	45	Qualification for the championship round
6	Lech Poznań	30	13	4	13	37	38	−1	43	Qualification for the championship round
7	Lechia Gdańsk (Note: Lechia Gdańsk were punished with a deduction of one point for failing with licensing requirements. On 8 April 2016 the punishment was suspended by Polish Court of Arbitration for Sport. On April 11 an appeal against the original decision was withdrawn by the club.)	30	10	9	11	45	37	+8	38 (Note: Head-to-head record: Lechia 7 points, Ruch 5 points, Podbeskidzie 3 points.)	Qualification for the championship round
8	Ruch Chorzów (Note: Ruch Chorzów were punished with a deduction of one point for failing with licensing requirements.)	30	11	6	13	37	46	−9	38	Qualification for the championship round
9	Podbeskidzie Bielsko-Biała	30	9	11	10	37	46	−9	38	Qualification for the relegation round
10	Korona Kielce	30	9	10	11	32	37	−5	37	Qualification for the relegation round
11	Wisła Kraków (Note: Wisła Kraków were punished with a deduction of one point for failing with licensing requirements.)	30	8	13	9	45	35	+10	36	Qualification for the relegation round
12	Jagiellonia Białystok	30	10	5	15	37	54	−17	35	Qualification for the relegation round
13	Śląsk Wrocław	30	8	10	12	28	37	−9	34	Qualification for the relegation round
14	Nieciecza	30	8	9	13	33	43	−10	33	Qualification for the relegation round
15	Górnik Łęczna	30	8	7	15	30	43	−13	31	Qualification for the relegation round
16	Górnik Zabrze (Note: Górnik Zabrze were punished with a deduction of one point for failing with licensing requirements.)	30	4	14	12	33	46	−13	25	Qualification for the relegation round

Source: Ekstraklasa, Soccerway
Rules for classification: 1) Points; 2) Head-to-head points; 3) Head-to-head goal difference; 4) Head-to-head goals scored; 5) Head-to-head away goals scored (only if two teams); 6) Goal difference; 7) Goals scored; 8) Fairplay ranking; 9) Draw. (Note: Head-to-head record is used only after all the matches between the teams in question have been played).

=== Positions by round ===
Team ╲ Round	1	2	3	4	5	6	7	8	9	10	11	12	13	14	15	16	17	18	19	20	21	22	23	24	25	26	27	28	29	30
Legia	1	1	1	1	2	3	3	4	2	3	4	3	4	2	2	2	2	2	2	2	2	2	2	1	2	1	1	1	1	1
Piast	5	9	6	2	1	1	1	1	1	1	1	1	1	1	1	1	1	1	1	1	1	1	1	2	1	2	2	2	2	2
Pogoń	4	4	7	8	5	6	5	2	3	2	2	2	2	3	4	6	4	4	4	4	4	4	4	3	4	4	4	4	4	3
Zagłębie	7	11	10	11	10	9	6	6	4	5	5	5	8	10	12	8	5	6	6	7	8	7	8	7	6	5	6	5	5	4
Cracovia	5	5	2	5	3	2	2	5	10	4	3	4	3	4	3	3	3	3	3	3	3	3	3	4	3	3	3	3	3	5
Lech	12	7	12	11	13	14	14	15	16	16	16	16	15	15	15	14	12	10	7	5	6	5	6	8	5	5	5	6	6	6
Lechia	13	15	13	14	14	12	12	13	13	13	8	10	7	9	11	12	13	14	12	8	10	8	11	10	11	8	9	9	8	7
Ruch	15	8	4	4	7	5	9	3	7	9	13	12	10	11	7	4	6	5	5	6	5	6	5	5	7	7	7	7	7	8
Podbeskidzie	7	13	14	15	15	15	15	14	14	14	14	14	12	12	10	11	11	13	13	14	16	16	15	12	9	11	11	12	10	9
Korona	3	2	3	3	9	7	7	8	12	10	10	6	5	6	5	7	8	9	10	11	12	12	9	11	13	13	13	13	12	10
Wisła	9	10	8	9	11	10	8	11	6	6	7	9	6	7	6	5	7	8	9	12	13	14	14	15	15	14	14	11	9	11
Jagiellonia	11	6	11	7	4	4	4	10	5	7	9	11	13	13	13	13	14	12	14	9	8	11	7	6	8	10	8	8	11	12
Śląsk	16	12	9	10	6	8	10	7	11	12	12	13	14	14	14	15	15	15	16	15	14	10	12	13	14	15	15	15	14	13
Nieciecza	13	16	16	13	12	13	11	9	8	8	6	8	11	8	9	10	10	7	8	10	11	13	13	14	12	9	10	10	13	14
Górnik Ł.	2	3	4	5	7	11	13	12	9	11	11	7	9	5	8	9	9	11	11	13	9	9	10	9	10	12	12	14	15	15
Górnik Z.	9	14	15	16	16	16	16	16	15	15	15	15	16	16	16	16	16	16	15	16	15	15	16	16	16	16	16	16	16	16

=== Results ===
Home \ Away	CRA	GKŁ	GÓR	JAG	KOR	LGD	LPO	LEG	PIA	PBB	POG	RUC	ŚLĄ	NIE	WIS	ZLU
Cracovia		0–0	3–0	1–1	2–2	3–0	5–2	1–2	1–2	4–1	4–1	2–1	4–1	2–3	1–1	1–2
Górnik Łęczna	1–0		2–1	3–2	3–2	3–1	0–1	0–2	0–0	1–2	2–3	0–3	2–3	1–2	1–0	0–2
Górnik Zabrze	1–1	1–1		1–3	0–1	1–1	0–2	2–2	5–2	0–2	1–1	0–2	2–0	0–0	1–1	2–2
Jagiellonia Białystok	2–2	1–0	2–3		1–0	0–3	1–0	1–1	0–2	0–3	0–0	2–1	2–1	2–0	1–4	1–2
Korona Kielce	0–3	0–2	2–1	3–2		4–2	0–1	1–3	1–1	0–0	1–1	1–2	2–2	0–1	1–1	0–2
Lechia Gdańsk	0–1	3–1	1–1	5–1	0–0		0–1	1–3	3–1	5–0	1–1	2–0	1–0	1–1	2–0	3–1
Lech Poznań	2–1	3–1	1–1	0–2	0–0	2–1		0–2	0–1	0–1	1–2	2–2	0–1	5–2	2–0	2–0
Legia Warsaw	3–1	2–1	3–1	4–0	1–2	1–1	0–1		1–1	5–0	1–0	2–0	1–0	1–1	1–1	2–2
Piast Gliwice	2–2	3–0	3–2	2–0	0–1	2–1	2–0	2–1		3–2	0–0	3–0	1–0	1–0	1–0	2–0
Podbeskidzie Bielsko-Biała	0–1	2–0	0–0	1–1	1–1	1–1	4–1	2–2	2–2		2–3	1–1	0–1	2–0	0–6	1–2
Pogoń Szczecin	2–2	0–0	1–1	2–1	3–2	1–0	0–2	0–0	3–1	2–0		2–3	1–1	1–1	1–1	0–0
Ruch Chorzów	2–3	0–2	1–0	0–4	2–1	3–2	1–3	1–4	2–0	1–1	0–2		1–0	4–1	2–3	0–0
Śląsk Wrocław	2–1	2–1	0–0	3–1	0–1	0–0	1–1	1–4	1–2	1–1	0–0	0–0		2–0	1–0	0–2
Nieciecza	1–1	1–1	3–0	2–0	0–1	0–1	3–1	3–0	3–5	0–2	1–1	0–1	1–1		2–4	1–0
Wisła Kraków	1–2	1–1	1–1	5–1	0–0	3–3	2–0	0–2	1–1	1–2	0–1	0–0	4–2	0–0		1–1
Zagłębie Lubin	4–2	0–0	2–4	0–2	0–2	1–0	2–1	1–2	4–1	1–1	1–1	3–1	1–1	2–0	1–3	

Source: 90minut.pl
Legend: Blue = home team win; Yellow = draw; Red = away team win.

== Play-offs ==
=== Championship round ===
==== League table ====
Pos	Team	Pld	W	D	L	GF	GA	GD	Pts	Qualification
1	Legia Warsaw (C)	37	21	10	6	70	32	+38	43	Qualification for the Champions League second qualifying round (Note: Legia Warsaw qualified for the Europa League second qualifying round by winning the 2015–16 Polish Cup. However, since they already qualified for European competition based on their league position, the spot awarded to the cup winners was passed down the league.)
2	Piast Gliwice	37	20	9	8	60	45	+15	40	Qualification for the Europa League second qualifying round
3	Zagłębie Lubin	37	17	9	11	55	42	+13	38	Qualification for the Europa League first qualifying round
4	Cracovia	37	16	10	11	66	50	+16	36	Qualification for the Europa League first qualifying round
5	Lechia Gdańsk (Note: Lechia Gdańsk were punished with a deduction of one point during regular season for failing with licensing requirements. On 8 April 2016 the punishment was suspended by Polish Court of Arbitration for Sport.On 11 April 2016 an appeal against the original decision was withdrawn by the club.)	37	14	10	13	53	44	+9	32	
6	Pogoń Szczecin	37	12	17	8	43	43	0	30	
7	Lech Poznań	37	14	6	17	42	47	−5	27	
8	Ruch Chorzów (Note: Ruch Chorzów were punished with a deduction of one point during regular season for failing with licensing requirements.)	37	11	8	18	40	60	−20	21	

Source: Ekstraklasa, Soccerway
Rules for classification: 1) Points; 2) Points in regular season; 3) Head-to-head points in regular season; 4) Head-to-head goal difference in regular season; 5) Head-to-head goals scored in regular season; 5) Head-to-head away goals scored in regular season (if only two teams); 7) Goal difference; 8) Goals scored; 9) Fairplay ranking; 10) Play-off (only if needed to decide champion, teams for relegation or teams for UEFA competitions).
(C) Champions

==== Positions by round ====
Team ╲ Round	30	31	32	33	34	35	36	37
Legia	1	1	1	1	1	1	1	1
Piast	2	2	2	2	2	2	2	2
Zagłębie	4	5	6	5	4	4	3	3
Cracovia	5	4	3	4	3	3	4	4
Lechia	7	7	4	6	6	5	5	5
Pogoń	3	3	5	3	5	6	6	6
Lech	6	6	7	7	7	7	7	7
Ruch	8	8	8	8	8	8	8	8

==== Results ====
Home \ Away	LEG	PIA	POG	ZLU	CRA	LPO	LGD	RUC
Legia Warsaw		4–0	3–0		4–0	1–0		
Piast Gliwice			2–1	0–1	1–1		3–0	
Pogoń Szczecin				1–3	3–2	1–0		1–1
Zagłębie Lubin	2–0					3–0	1–2	4–1
Cracovia				1–0		2–0	2–0	
Lech Poznań		2–2					0–0	3–0
Lechia Gdańsk	2–0		2–0					2–1
Ruch Chorzów	0–0	0–3			0–1			

Source: 90minut.pl
Legend: Blue = home team win; Yellow = draw; Red = away team win.

=== Relegation round ===
==== League table ====
Pos	Team	Pld	W	D	L	GF	GA	GD	Pts	Relegation
9	Wisła Kraków (Note: Wisła Kraków were punished with a deduction of one point during regular season for failing with licensing requirements.)	37	12	15	10	61	45	+16	32	
10	Śląsk Wrocław	37	12	12	13	41	46	−5	31	
11	Jagiellonia Białystok	37	13	6	18	46	62	−16	28	
12	Korona Kielce	37	10	15	12	39	45	−6	27	
13	Nieciecza	37	10	12	15	39	50	−11	26	
14	Górnik Łęczna	37	10	9	18	40	53	−13	24	
15	Górnik Zabrze (Note: Górnik Zabrze were punished with a deduction of one point during regular season for failing with licensing requirements.) (R)	37	6	18	13	38	51	−13	23	Relegation to the I liga
16	Podbeskidzie Bielsko-Biała (R)	37	9	12	16	45	63	−18	20	Relegation to the I liga

Source: Ekstraklasa, Soccerway
Rules for classification: 1) Points; 2) Points in regular season; 3) Head-to-head points in regular season; 4) Head-to-head goal difference in regular season; 5) Head-to-head goals scored in regular season; 5) Head-to-head away goals scored in regular season (if only two teams); 7) Goal difference; 8) Goals scored; 9) Fairplay ranking; 10) Play-off (only if needed to decide champion, teams for relegation or teams for UEFA competitions).
(R) Relegated

==== Positions by round ====
Team ╲ Round	30	31	32	33	34	35	36	37
Wisła	11	9	9	9	9	9	9	9
Śląsk	13	14	12	10	12	10	10	10
Jagiellonia	12	10	11	12	11	12	12	11
Korona	10	11	10	11	10	11	11	12
Nieciecza	14	12	13	13	13	13	13	13
Górnik Ł.	15	15	15	15	14	14	14	14
Górnik Z.	16	16	16	16	15	15	15	15
Podbeskidzie	9	13	14	14	16	16	16	16

==== Results ====
Home \ Away	PBB	KOR	WIS	JAG	ŚLĄ	NIE	GKŁ	GÓR
Podbeskidzie Bielsko-Biała		1–1	3–4		1–2	0–1		
Korona Kielce			3–2	1–3	1–1		1–1	
Wisła Kraków				1–0	1–1	2–2		3–1
Jagiellonia Białystok	3–2					0–1	2–0	0–0
Śląsk Wrocław				3–1		2–1	3–2	
Nieciecza		0–0					0–2	1–1
Górnik Łęczna	5–1		0–3					0–0
Górnik Zabrze	1–0	0–0			2–1			

Source: 90minut.pl
Legend: Blue = home team win; Yellow = draw; Red = away team win.

== Season statistics ==
=== Top goalscorers ===
Rank	Player	Club	Goals
1	(Hungary) Nemanja Nikolić	Legia Warsaw	28
2	(Spain) Airam López	Korona Kielce	16
3	(Latvia) Deniss Rakeļs	Cracovia	15
3	(Poland) Mariusz Stępiński	Ruch Chorzów	15
5	(Poland) Paweł Brożek	Wisła Kraków	14
6	(Poland) Mateusz Cetnarski	Cracovia	13
6	(Slovakia) Erik Jendrišek	Cracovia	13
8	(Croatia) Josip Barišić	Piast Gliwice	11
8	(Finland) Kasper Hämäläinen	Legia Warsaw (3); Lech Poznań (8)	11
8	(Poland) Grzegorz Kuświk	Lechia Gdańsk	11
8	(Czech Republic) Martin Nešpor	Piast Gliwice	11

=== Top assists ===
Rank	Player	Club	Assists
1	(Slovakia) Patrik Mráz	Piast Gliwice	13
2	(Poland) Mateusz Cetnarski	Cracovia	12
3	(Hungary) Nemanja Nikolić	Legia Warsaw	10
3	(Poland) Tomasz Nowak	Górnik Łęczna	10
5	(Slovakia) Ondrej Duda	Legia Warsaw	9
5	(Poland) Tomasz Jodłowiec	Legia Warsaw	9
5	(Poland) Adam Mójta	Podbeskidzie Bielsko-Biała	9
5	(Poland) Rafał Murawski	Pogoń Szczecin	9
5	(Poland) Filip Starzyński	Zagłębie Lubin	9
5	(Poland) Rafał Wolski	Wisła Kraków	9

== Attendances ==
Pos	Team	Total	High	Low	Average	Change
1	Legia Warsaw	403,049	29,381	8,181	21,213	+27.8%
2	Lech Poznań	301,701	41,567	10,289	16,761	−17.3%
3	Lechia Gdańsk	230,657	22,415	8,827	12,814	−22.8%
4	Wisła Kraków	232,536	23,079	6,497	12,239	+0.7%
5	Jagiellonia Białystok	194,308	22,172	6,734	10,227	−4.9%
6	Górnik Zabrze	168,116	24,563	4,325	9,340	+215.4%
7	Śląsk Wrocław	157,339	13,916	4,282	8,741	−20.3%
8	Cracovia	156,171	14,000	6,235	8,676	+30.0%
9	Ruch Chorzów	130,396	9,300	4,785	7,244	+28.0%
10	Pogoń Szczecin	129,876	14,348	3,214	6,836	+12.0%
11	Korona Kielce	125,523	9,136	4,331	6,606	+5.1%
12	Piast Gliwice	120,821	9,523	4,058	6,359	+38.4%
13	Zagłębie Lubin	112,738	10,482	0	6,263	n/a^{1}
14	Podbeskidzie Bielsko-Biała	96,924	6,517	3,528	5,101	+28.9%
15	Górnik Łęczna	76,242	7,437	3,011	4,236	+1.7%
16	Nieciecza	58,285	4,950	1,357	3,238	n/a^{1,2}
	League total	2,694,673	41,567	0	9,104	+9.4%

Updated to games played on 24 May 2016
Source: 90minut.pl (in Polish)
Notes:
1: Team played last season in I Liga
2: Nieciecza played 7 first home games at Stadion Stali Mielec (cap. 6,864) in Mielec

== Awards ==
=== Monthly awards ===
==== Player of the Month ====
Month	Player	Club
August 2015	(Hungary) Nemanja Nikolić	Legia Warsaw
September 2015	(Hungary) Nemanja Nikolić	Legia Warsaw
October 2015	(Hungary) Nemanja Nikolić	Legia Warsaw
November 2015	(Poland) Mateusz Cetnarski	Cracovia
February 2016	(Poland) Rafał Murawski	Pogoń Szczecin
March 2016	(Poland) Filip Starzyński	Zagłębie Lubin
April 2016	(Switzerland) Aleksandar Prijović	Legia Warsaw

=== Annual awards ===
Award	Player	Club	Match
Player of the Season	(Hungary) Nemanja Nikolić	Legia Warsaw	
Goalkeeper of the Season	(Poland) Jakub Szmatuła	Piast Gliwice	
Defender of the Season	(Slovakia) Patrik Mráz	Piast Gliwice	
Midfielder of the Season	(Poland) Rafał Murawski	Pogoń Szczecin	
Forward of the Season	(Hungary) Nemanja Nikolić	Legia Warsaw	
Coach of the Season	(Czech Republic) Radoslav Látal	Piast Gliwice	
Discovery of the Season	(Poland) Bartosz Kapustka	Cracovia	
Goal of the Season	(Poland) Jarosław Fojut	Pogoń Szczecin	vs. Piast Gliwice (8th round)
Save of the Season	(Poland) Radosław Cierzniak	Wisła Kraków	vs. Lech Poznań (3rd round)
Plus of the Season	(Hungary) Nemanja Nikolić	Legia Warsaw	
Turbokozak	(Poland) Sebastian Steblecki	Górnik Zabrze	

Team of the Year
Goalkeeper	(Poland) Arkadiusz Malarz (Legia Warsaw)			
Defenders	(Poland) Michał Pazdan (Legia Warsaw)	(Poland) Patrik Mráz (Piast Gliwice)	(Poland) Tomasz Kędziora (Lech Poznań)	(Poland) Jarosław Fojut (Pogoń Szczecin)
Midfielders	(Estonia) Konstantin Vassiljev (Jagiellonia Białystok)	(Poland) Rafał Murawski (Pogoń Szczecin)		(Poland) Damian Dąbrowski (Cracovia)
Forwards	(Hungary) Nemanja Nikolić (Legia Warsaw)	(Poland) Mariusz Stępiński (Ruch Chorzów)		(Lithuania) Fedor Černych (Jagiellonia Białystok)
