= 2022–23 Korona Kielce season =

Korona Kielce
2022–23 season
- Stadium: Stadion Miejski
- Ekstraklasa: 17th
- Polish Cup: Round of 32

The 2022–23 season is Korona Kielce's 50th season in existence and the club's first season back in the top flight of Polish football. In addition to the domestic league, Korona Kielce will participate in this season's edition of the Polish Cup. The season covers the period from 1 July 2022 to 30 June 2023.

== Players ==
=== First-team squad ===
As of 28 November 2022

Note: Flags indicate national team as defined under FIFA eligibility rules; some limited exceptions apply. Players may hold more than one non-FIFA nationality.

No.	Pos.	Nation	Player
1	GK	(Poland) POL	Konrad Forenc
2	DF	(Canada) CAN	Dominick Zator
3	DF	(Spain) ESP	Roberto Corral
4	DF	(Poland) POL	Piotr Malarczyk
5	DF	(Poland) POL	Radosław Seweryś
6	MF	(Poland) POL	Jacek Podgórski
7	MF	(Poland) POL	Jakub Łukowski
8	MF	(Slovakia) SVK	Dalibor Takáč
9	FW	(Poland) POL	Adam Frączczak
10	MF	(Poland) POL	Jacek Kiełb
11	MF	(Poland) POL	Łukasz Sierpina
12	GK	(Poland) POL	Adrian Sandach
13	MF	(Romania) ROU	Ronaldo Deaconu
14	DF	(Poland) POL	Dawid Więckowski
16	MF	(Poland) POL	Janusz Nojszewski
17	MF	(Poland) POL	Dawid Błanik

No.	Pos.	Nation	Player
18	FW	(Poland) POL	Bartosz Śpiączka
20	MF	(Poland) POL	Marcin Szpakowski
22	MF	(Poland) POL	Adam Deja
23	DF	(Poland) POL	Adrian Danek
25	DF	(Poland) POL	Grzegorz Szymusik
26	MF	(Poland) POL	Oskar Sewerzyński
31	MF	(Poland) POL	Miłosz Strzeboński
33	DF	(Montenegro) MNE	Saša Balić
66	MF	(Poland) POL	Miłosz Trojak
73	GK	(Poland) POL	Marcel Zapytowski
76	FW	(Poland) POL	Hubert Szulc
87	GK	(Poland) POL	Rafał Mamla
90	DF	(Ukraine) UKR	Kyrylo Petrov
95	DF	(Croatia) CRO	Mario Zebić
99	FW	(Belarus) BLR	Yevgeniy Shikavka

=== Out on loan ===
Note: Flags indicate national team as defined under FIFA eligibility rules; some limited exceptions apply. Players may hold more than one non-FIFA nationality.

No.	Pos.	Nation	Player
77	MF	(Poland) POL	Jakub Górski

=== Other players under contract ===
Note: Flags indicate national team as defined under FIFA eligibility rules; some limited exceptions apply. Players may hold more than one non-FIFA nationality.

No.	Pos.	Nation	Player
—	MF	(Bosnia and Herzegovina) BIH	Zvonimir Petrović

== Pre-season and friendlies ==
Win Draw Loss Fixtures

== Competitions ==
=== Overview ===
Competition	First match	Last match	Starting round	Final position	Record							
Competition	First match	Last match	Starting round	Final position	Pld	W	D	L	GF	GA	GD	Win %
Ekstraklasa	15 July 2022	27 May 2023	Matchday 1		17	3	4	10	17	26	−9	17.65
Polish Cup	30 August 2022	18 October 2022	First round	Round of 32	2	0	1	1	3	4	−1	0.00
Total					19	3	5	11	20	30	−10	15.79

Last updated: July 2022
Source: Competitions

=== Ekstraklasa ===
==== League table ====
Pos	Team	Pld	W	D	L	GF	GA	GD	Pts
11	Stal Mielec	34	11	10	13	36	40	−4	43
12	Widzew Łódź	34	11	8	15	38	47	−9	41
13	Korona Kielce	34	11	8	15	39	48	−9	41
14	Jagiellonia Białystok	34	9	14	11	48	49	−1	41
15	Śląsk Wrocław	34	9	11	14	35	48	−13	38

Source: ekstraklasa.org
Rules for classification: 1) Points; 2) Head-to-head points; 3) Head-to-head goal difference; 4) Goal difference; 5) Goals scored; 6) Number of wins; 7) Number of away wins; 8) Lower number of points based on yellow and red cards (red card = 3 points, yellow card = 1 point, sending-off = 3 points - including 1 point for first yellow card); 9) Fairplay ranking; 10) Draw. (Note: Head-to-head record is used only after all the matches between the teams in question have been played)

==== Results summary ====
Overall								Home						Away					
Pld	W	D	L	GF	GA	GD	Pts	W	D	L	GF	GA	GD	W	D	L	GF	GA	GD
0	0	0	0	0	0	0	0	0	0	0	0	0	0	0	0	0	0	0	0

Last updated: July 2022.
Source: PKO Ekstraklasa

==== Results by round ====
Round	1
Ground	
Result	
Position	

Updated to match(es) played on July 2022. Source: PKO Ekstraklasa
A = Away; H = Home; W = Win; D = Draw; L = Loss

==== Matches ====
The league fixtures were announced on 1 June 2022.

July 2022 1	v
