= Borecki =

Borecki (feminine: Borecka; plural: Boreccy) is a Polish surname. Notable people with the surname include:

- Michał Borecki (born 1997), Polish footballer
- Wojciech Borecki (born 1955), Polish football manager
