= Iván Martín (footballer, born 1995) =

Spanish footballer

Personal information
- Full name: Iván Martín Gómez
- Date of birth: 4 March 1995 (age 31)
- Place of birth: Villaverde del Río, Spain
- Height: 1.83 m (6 ft 0 in)
- Position: Forward

Team information
- Current team: Manchego Ciudad Real
- Number: 10

Youth career
- 1999–2006: Villaverde
- 2006–2009: San José
- 2009–2012: Villaverde
- 2012–2014: Betis

Senior career*
Years	Team	Apps	(Gls)
2012	Brenes	8	(6)
2014–2015	Betis B	4	(0)
2014–2015	→ Alcoyano (loan)	2	(0)
2015	→ Écija (loan)	10	(0)
2015–2016	Tudelano	27	(7)
2016–2017	Valladolid B	21	(2)
2017–2018	Pontevedra	7	(3)
2018–2019	Odra Opole	26	(5)
2019–2021	Podbeskidzie	14	(2)
2021–2022	Linense	29	(1)
2022–2023	Compostela	2	(0)
2023	Pistoiese	6	(0)
2024	Manchego Ciudad Real	4	(0)
- * Club domestic league appearances and goals as of 10 March 2024

Iván Martín Gómez (born 4 March 1995) is a Spanish professional footballer who plays as a forward.

== Club career ==
Born in Villaverde del Río, Martín represented UD Villaverde, AD San José as a youth, and made his senior debut with Brenes Balompié in 2012, in Primera Andaluza. After scoring six goals in eight matches, he joined the youth setup of Real Betis in the same year. On 9 February 2014, he made his debut for the reserves in Tercera División, coming on as a substitute for Ismael César García in a 2–0 victory over La Palma CF.

On 9 September 2014, Martín was loaned out to Segunda División B club CD Alcoyano for the upcoming season. However, after struggling to get playing time, he terminated the deal and moved to Écija Balompié on loan on 5 January 2015.

On 31 August 2015, Martín switched to CD Tudelano. He scored his first goal for the club in a 2–1 win against Coruxo FC. On 2 August 2016, he moved to Real Valladolid B on a one-year contract. On 17 August 2017, he signed for Pontevedra CF.

On 12 July 2018, Martín moved abroad and joined Polish club Odra Opole on a two-year contract. Nine days later he made his debut, scoring in a 2–1 victory against GKS Tychy.
