= María Díaz Cañete =

Spanish politician (1984–2024)

María Díaz Cañete (7 February 1984 – 19 September 2024) was a Spanish journalist and politician from the People's Party of Andalusia (PPA), member of the Andalusian parliament from 2023 until her death in 2024.

== Career ==
Díaz Cañete was born on February 7, 1984 in Lora del Río, province of Sevilla.

She graduated in journalism from the University of Sevilla and got a master's degree in Institutional Business and Political Communication Management. Her work as a journalist began at Telecable Andalucía, where she worked between November 2010 and November 2016.

Between November 2016 and June 2019 she was Head of the Lora del Río Mayor's Office, and became elected city councillor in the 2019 local elections, assuming the portfolio of: Urban Planning, Finance, Personnel, Education, Citizenship and Culture, an office she held until June 2022.

Díaz Cañete became member of the Parliament of Andalusia representing Sevilla constituency in the group of Andalusian People's Party on 22 June 2023.

== Personal life and death ==
Diaz Cañete was married in 2018. She died from cancer on 19 September 2024, at the age of 40.
