= Filip Modelski =

Polish footballer (born 1992)

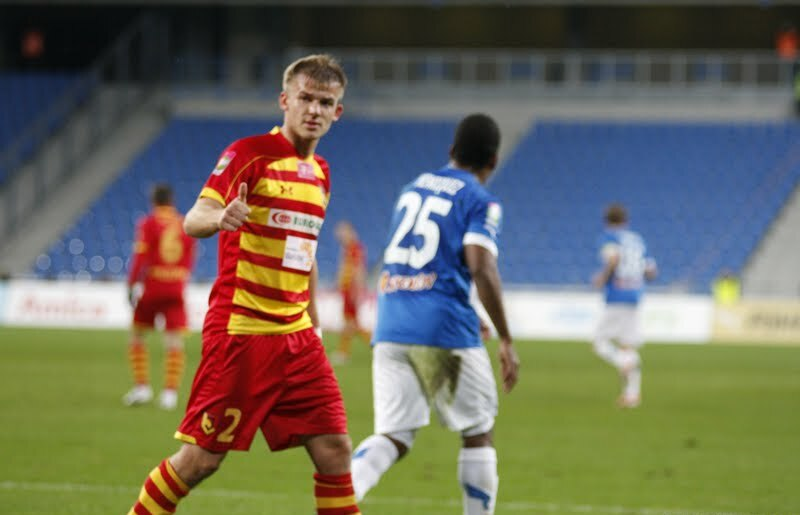
- Modelski with Jagiellonia in 2012

Personal information
- Date of birth: 28 September 1992 (age 34)
- Place of birth: Gdynia, Poland
- Height: 1.81 m (5 ft 11 in)
- Position: Full-back

Youth career
- 2006–2008: Arka Gdynia
- 2008–2009: West Ham United

Senior career*
Years	Team	Apps	(Gls)
2009–2011	West Ham United	0	(0)
2011–2012	GKS Bełchatów	20	(0)
2012–2016	Jagiellonia Białystok	65	(1)
2013–2016	Jagiellonia Białystok II	20	(0)
2016	Hibernian B		
2017–2018	Bytovia Bytów	1	(0)
2018–2021	Podbeskidzie Bielsko-Biała	72	(1)
2021–2022	Bruk-Bet Termalica	7	(0)
2022	Kotwica Kołobrzeg	3	(0)
Total		188	(2)

International career
2007–2008	Poland U16		
2007	Poland U17	1	(0)
2010	Poland U18	1	(0)
2010–2011	Poland U19	10	(0)
2011–2013	Poland U20	2	(0)
2012	Poland U21	2	(0)
2011	Poland	1	(0)
- * Club domestic league appearances and goals

Filip Modelski (born 28 September 1992) is a Polish former professional footballer who played as a full-back.

== Career ==
=== Club ===
Modelski spent three seasons at English club West Ham United between 2008 and 2011. He played youth football with the club, but did not make a senior appearance. In August 2011, Modelski joined GKS Bełchatów on a one-year contract.
