= Milan Rundić =

Serbian footballer

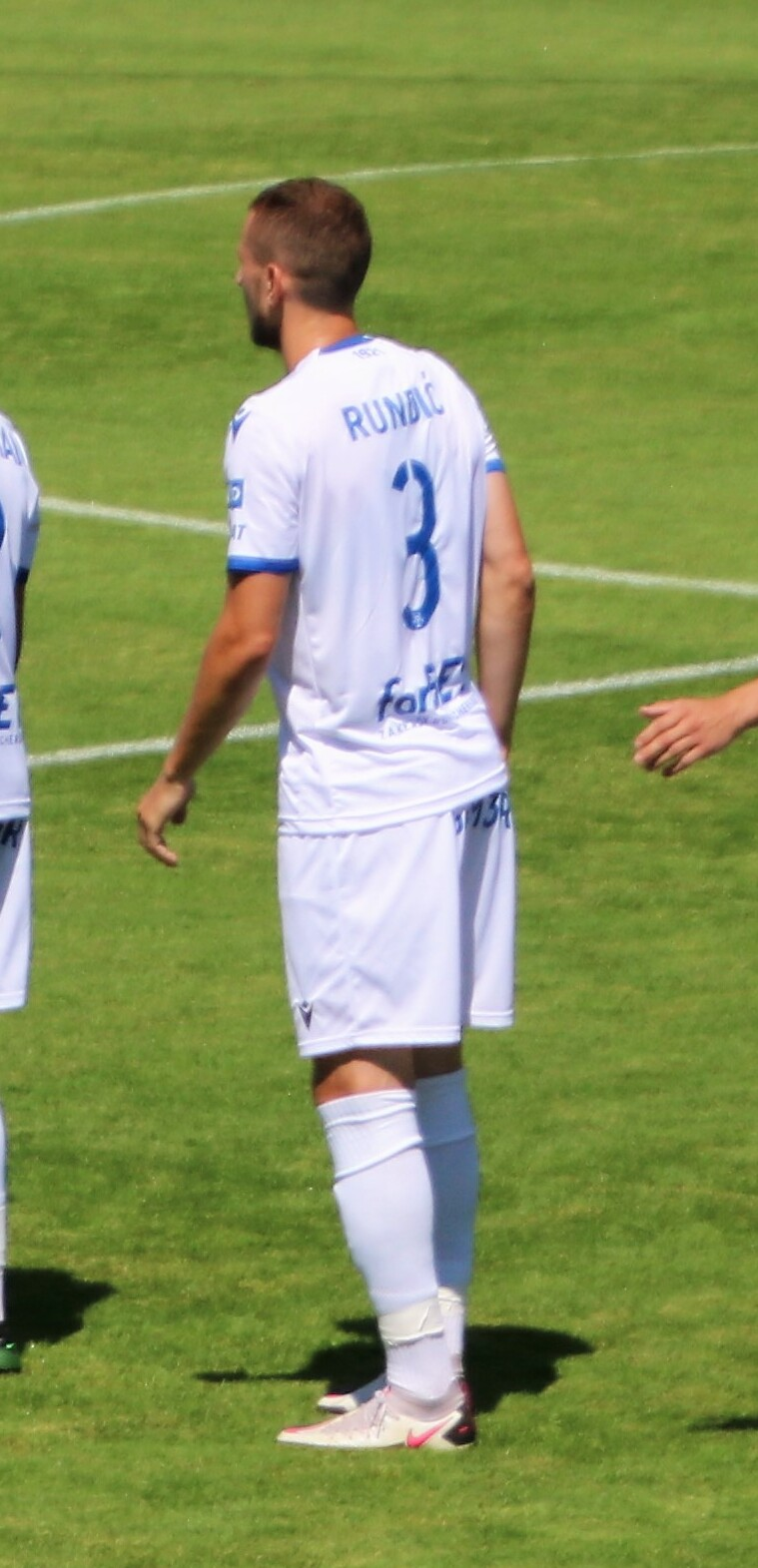
- Rundić with Raków Częstochowa in 2021

Personal information
- Date of birth: 29 March 1992 (age 34)
- Place of birth: Belgrade, SFR Yugoslavia
- Height: 1.88 m (6 ft 2 in)
- Position: Centre-back

Team information
- Current team: Slovácko
- Number: 3

Youth career
- FK Kolubara

Senior career*
Years	Team	Apps	(Gls)
2010–2013	Kolubara	45	(4)
2013	Inter Zaprešić	3	(0)
2013–2016	AS Trenčín	57	(3)
2016–2018	Slovan Bratislava	35	(2)
2019–2020	Karviná	45	(2)
2020–2021	Podbeskidzie Bielsko-Biała	21	(1)
2021–2025	Raków Częstochowa	60	(1)
2025–	Slovácko	21	(0)
2025–	Slovácko B	3	(0)

International career
2014	Serbia U21	1	(0)
- * Club domestic league appearances and goals as of 25 May 2026

Milan Rundić (born 29 March 1992) is a Serbian professional footballer who plays as a centre-back for Czech First League club Slovácko.

== Club career ==
=== AS Trenčín ===
He came to AS Trenčín in summer 2013 together with his teammate Haris Hajradinović from Croatian club Inter Zaprešić. He signed a three-year contract, as did Hajradinović. Rundić made his debut for Trenčín against Slovan Bratislava on 28 April 2013.

=== Podbeskidzie Bielsko-Biała ===
On 7 August 2020, he joined Polish club Podbeskidzie Bielsko-Biała.

=== Slovácko ===
On 20 August 2025, Rundić signed a contract with Czech First League club Slovácko until summer 2027.

== Career statistics ==
As of match played 24 May 2025

Appearances and goals by club, season and competition
Club	Season	League			National cup (Note: Includes Slovenian Cup, Slovak Cup, Czech Cup, Polish Cup)		Continental		Other		Total	
Club	Season	Division	Apps	Goals	Apps	Goals	Apps	Goals	Apps	Goals	Apps	Goals
Kolubara	2010–11	PrvaLiga	14	0	0	0	0	0	0	0	14	0
Kolubara	2011–12	PrvaLiga	18	2	1	0	0	0	0	0	19	2
Kolubara	2012–13	PrvaLiga	13	2	0	0	0	0	0	0	13	2
Kolubara	Total		45	4	1	0	0	0	0	0	46	4
Inter Zaprešić	2012–13	Croatian Football League	3	0	0	0	0	0	0	0	3	0
Trenčín	2013–14	Slovak First Football League	18	1	0	0	0	0	0	0	18	1
Trenčín	2014–15	Slovak First Football League	22	1	6	0	4 (Note: Appearances in UEFA Europa League)	0	0	0	32	1
Trenčín	2015–16	Slovak First Football League	17	1	3	0	2 (Note: Appearances in UEFA Champions League)	0	0	0	22	1
Trenčín	Total		57	3	9	0	6	0	0	0	72	3
Slovan Bratislava	2016–17	Slovak First Football League	10	1	4	1	0	0	0	0	14	2
Slovan Bratislava	2017–18	Slovak First Football League	24	1	6	0	4	0	0	0	34	1
Slovan Bratislava	2018–19	Slovak First Football League	1	0	0	0	0	0	0	0	1	0
Slovan Bratislava	Total		35	2	10	1	4	0	0	0	49	3
Karvina	2018–19	Czech First League	16	0	1	0	0	0	0	0	17	0
Karvina	2019–20	Czech First League	29	2	0	0	0	0	0	0	29	2
Karvina	Total		45	2	1	0	0	0	0	0	46	2
Podbeskidzie	2020–21	Ekstraklasa	21	1	1	0	0	0	0	0	22	1
Raków Częstochowa	2021–22	Ekstraklasa	18	1	2	0	4	0	1 (Note: Appearance in Polish Super Cup)	0	25	1
Raków Częstochowa	2022–23	Ekstraklasa	18	0	1	0	6	0	1	0	26	0
Raków Częstochowa	2023–24	Ekstraklasa	11	0	2	1	9 (Note: Four appearances in UEFA Champions League, four appearances and one goal in UEFA Europa League)	1	1	0	23	2
Raków Częstochowa	2024–25	Ekstraklasa	13	0	1	0	—		—		14	0
Raków Częstochowa	Total		60	1	6	1	19	1	3	0	88	3
Career total			266	13	28	2	29	1	3	0	326	16

== Honours ==
Trenčín

- Slovak First Football League: 2014–15, 2015–16
- Slovak Cup: 2014–15, 2015–16

Slovan Bratislava

- Slovak Cup: 2016–17, 2017–18

Raków Częstochowa

- Ekstraklasa: 2022–23
- Polish Cup: 2021–22
- Polish Super Cup: 2021, 2022
