= Adam Frączczak =

Polish footballer (born 1987)

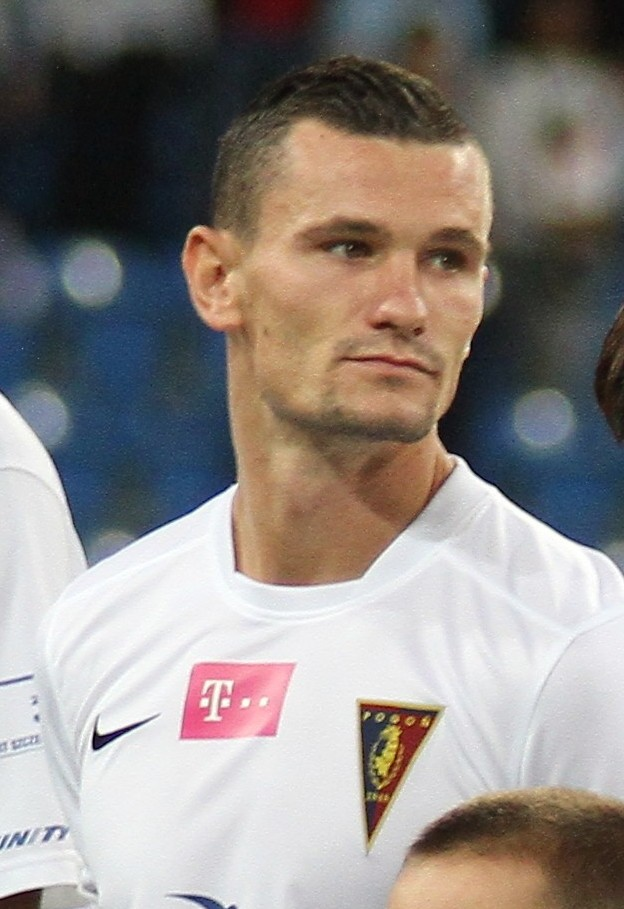
- Frączczak with Pogoń Szczecin in 2014

Personal information
- Full name: Adam Frączczak
- Date of birth: 7 August 1987 (age 39)
- Place of birth: Kołobrzeg, Poland
- Height: 1.80 m (5 ft 11 in)
- Position: Striker

Team information
- Current team: Świt Szczecin
- Number: 99

Youth career
- Żaki 94 Kołobrzeg

Senior career*
Years	Team	Apps	(Gls)
2006	Rega-Merida Trzebiatów		(1)
2006–2007	Legia Warsaw II		
2007–2008	Legia Warsaw	0	(0)
2008–2009	Dolcan Ząbki	16	(1)
2009–2011	Kotwica Kołobrzeg	43	(26)
2011–2021	Pogoń Szczecin	276	(65)
2013–2020	Pogoń Szczecin II	4	(6)
2021–2023	Korona Kielce	33	(7)
2023	Kotwica Kołobrzeg	13	(4)
2023–2026	Pogoń Szczecin II	67	(23)
2026–	Świt Szczecin	5	(2)
- * Club domestic league appearances and goals as of 15:52, 10 September 2026 (UTC)

Adam Frączczak (born 7 August 1987) is a Polish professional footballer who plays as a striker for II liga club Świt Szczecin.

== Career ==
In January 2011, he joined Pogoń Szczecin on a one-and-a-half-year contract.

== Career statistics ==
As of match played 9 May 2026

Appearances and goals by club, season and competition
Club	Season	League			Polish Cup		Other		Total	
Club	Season	Division	Apps	Goals	Apps	Goals	Apps	Goals	Apps	Goals
Legia Warsaw	2007–08	Ekstraklasa	0	0	0	0	5 (Note: Appearances in Ekstraklasa Cup)	0	5	0
Dolcan Ząbki	2008–09	I liga	16	1	0	0	—		16	1
Kotwica Kołobrzeg	2009–10	III liga, gr. D	29	16	2	2	—		31	18
Kotwica Kołobrzeg	2010–11	III liga, gr. D	14	10	0	0	—		14	10
Kotwica Kołobrzeg	Total		43	26	2	2	—		45	28
Pogoń Szczecin	2010–11	I liga	15	6	0	0	—		15	6
Pogoń Szczecin	2011–12	I liga	26	5	1	0	—		27	5
Pogoń Szczecin	2012–13	Ekstraklasa	28	5	1	0	—		29	5
Pogoń Szczecin	2013–14	Ekstraklasa	34	4	1	0	—		35	4
Pogoń Szczecin	2014–15	Ekstraklasa	34	5	1	0	—		35	5
Pogoń Szczecin	2015–16	Ekstraklasa	35	6	1	1	—		36	7
Pogoń Szczecin	2016–17	Ekstraklasa	31	12	5	3	—		36	15
Pogoń Szczecin	2017–18	Ekstraklasa	31	14	1	1	—		32	15
Pogoń Szczecin	2018–19	Ekstraklasa	8	1	—		—		8	1
Pogoń Szczecin	2019–20	Ekstraklasa	19	4	1	0	—		20	5
Pogoń Szczecin	2020–21	Ekstraklasa	15	3	0	0	—		15	3
Pogoń Szczecin	Total		276	65	12	5	—		288	70
Pogoń Szczecin II	2013–14	III liga, gr. D	1	0	—		—		1	0
Pogoń Szczecin II	2018–19	III liga, gr. II	1	3	—		—		1	3
Pogoń Szczecin II	2019–20	III liga, gr. II	1	1	—		—		1	1
Pogoń Szczecin II	2020–21	III liga, gr. II	1	2	—		—		1	2
Pogoń Szczecin II	Total		4	6	—		—		4	6
Korona Kielce	2021–22	I liga	22	4	2	0	2 (Note: Appearances in I liga promotion play-offs)	3	26	7
Korona Kielce	2022–23	Ekstraklasa	9	0	1	0	—		10	0
Korona Kielce	Total		31	4	3	0	2	3	36	7
Kotwica Kołobrzeg	2022–23	II liga	13	4	—		—		13	4
Pogoń Szczecin II	2023–24	III liga, gr. II	24	8	1	1	—		25	9
Pogoń Szczecin II	2024–25	III liga, gr. II	23	9	—		—		23	9
Pogoń Szczecin II	2025–26	III liga, gr. II	20	6	—		—		20	6
Pogoń Szczecin II	Total		67	23	1	1	—		68	24
Świt Szczecin	2026–27	II liga	0	0	—		—		0	0
Career total			450	129	18	8	7	3	475	140

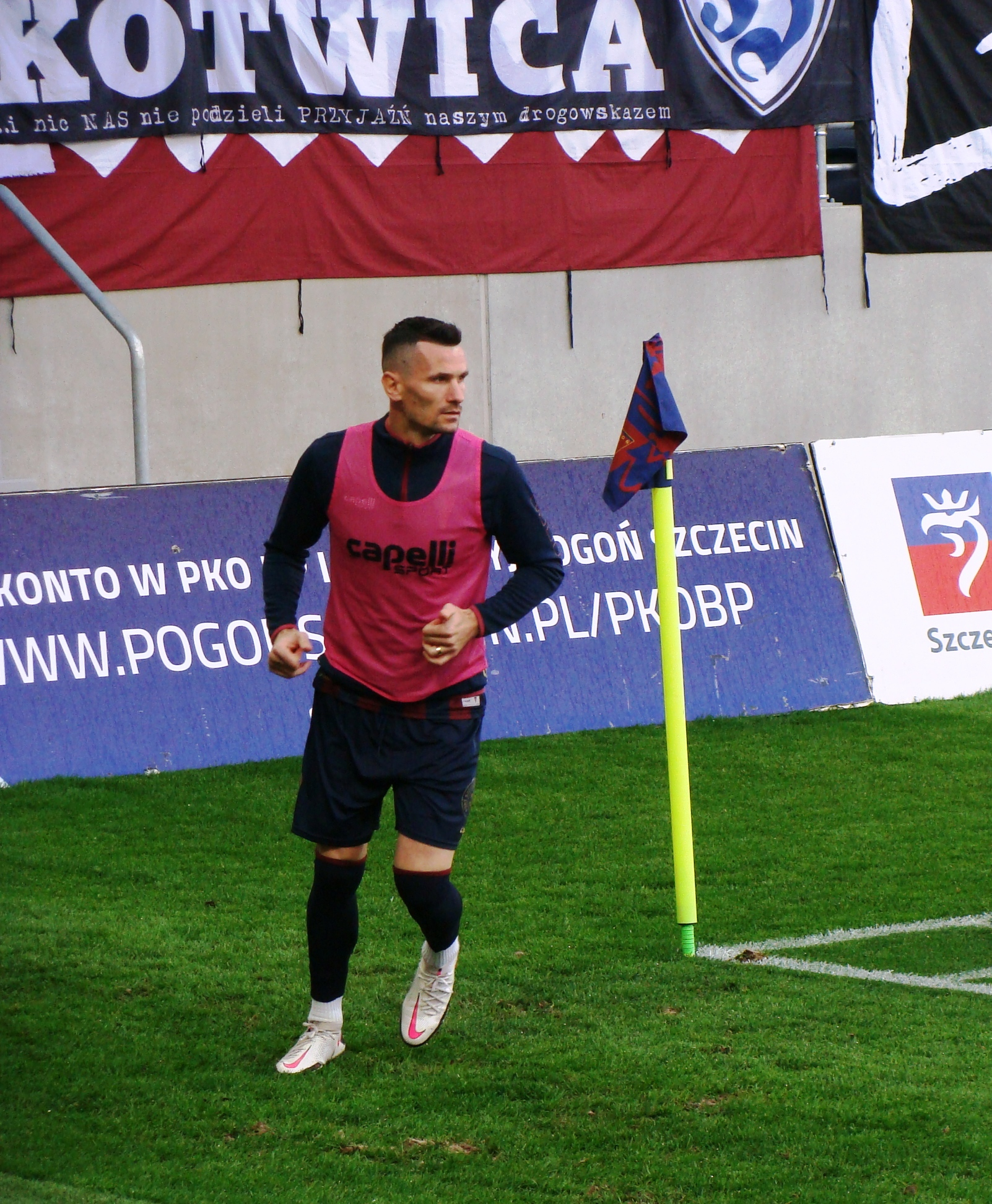
Frączczak in 2021

== Honours ==
Rega-Merida Trzebiatów

- IV liga West Pomerania: 2005–06

Individual

- Ekstraklasa Player of the Month: May 2018
