= Maksymilian Sitek =

Polish footballer (born 2000)

Personal information
- Date of birth: 4 December 2000 (age 25)
- Place of birth: Rzeszów, Poland
- Height: 1.74 m (5 ft 9 in)
- Position: Winger

Team information
- Current team: Podbeskidzie Bielsko-Biała
- Number: 7

Youth career
- –2012: Stal Rzeszów
- 2013: Resovia
- 2013–2020: Legia Warsaw

Senior career*
Years	Team	Apps	(Gls)
2018–2019	→ Siarka Tarnobrzeg (loan)	30	(2)
2019–2020	→ Puszcza Niepołomice (loan)	23	(2)
2020–	Podbeskidzie Bielsko-Biała	110	(11)
2021–2022	→ Stal Mielec (loan)	33	(3)
2024–2025	→ ŁKS Łódź (loan)	21	(1)
2024	→ ŁKS Łódź II (loan)	1	(0)

International career
2021	Poland U21	1	(0)
- * Club domestic league appearances and goals as of 14:50, 6 June 2026 (UTC)

Maksymilian Sitek (born 4 December 2000) is a Polish professional footballer who plays as a winger for I liga club Podbeskidzie Bielsko-Biała.

== Career statistics ==
As of match played 6 June 2026

Appearances and goals by club, season and competition
Club	Season	League			Polish Cup		Europe		Other		Total	
Club	Season	Division	Apps	Goals	Apps	Goals	Apps	Goals	Apps	Goals	Apps	Goals
Siarka Tarnobrzeg (loan)	2018–19	II liga	30	2	1	0	—		—		31	2
Puszcza Niepołomice (loan)	2019–20	I liga	23	2	0	0	—		—		23	2
Podbeskidzie Bielsko-Biała	2020–21	Ekstraklasa	18	1	1	0	—		—		19	1
Podbeskidzie Bielsko-Biała	2022–23	I liga	29	3	0	0	—		—		29	3
Podbeskidzie Bielsko-Biała	2023–24	I liga	31	2	2	0	—		—		33	2
Podbeskidzie Bielsko-Biała	2025–26	II liga	30	5	2	0	—		2 (Note: Appearances in II liga promotion play-offs)	0	34	5
Podbeskidzie Bielsko-Biała	Total		108	11	5	0	—		2	0	115	11
Stal Mielec (loan)	2021–22	Ekstraklasa	33	3	1	0	—		—		34	3
ŁKS Łódź (loan)	2024–25	I liga	21	1	3	0	—		—		24	1
ŁKS Łódź II (loan)	2024–25	II liga	1	0	0	0	—		—		1	0
Career total			216	19	10	0	—		2	0	228	19
