= Vega del Guadalquivir =

Comarca in the province of Seville

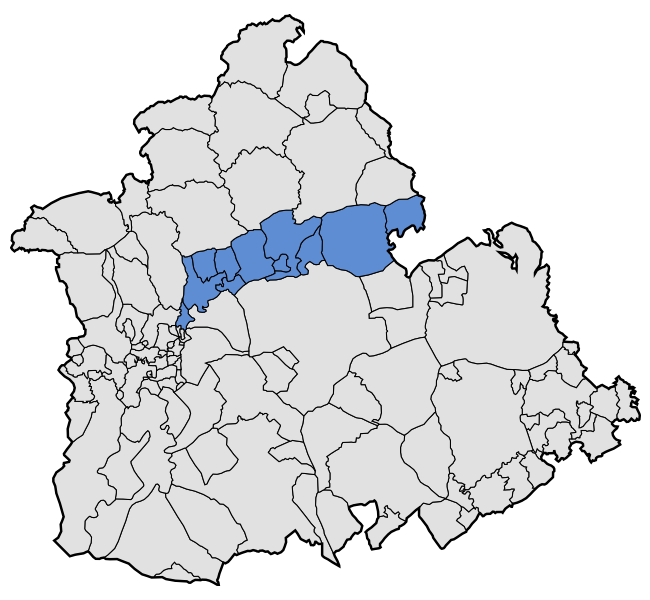

Vega del Guadalquivir is a comarca in the province of Seville. It contains the following municipalities:

- Alcalá del Río
- Alcolea del Río
- Brenes
- Burguillos
- Cantillana
- La Algaba
- Lora del Río
- Tocina
- Villanueva del Río y Minas
- Villaverde del Río
