= Villanueva del Río y Minas =

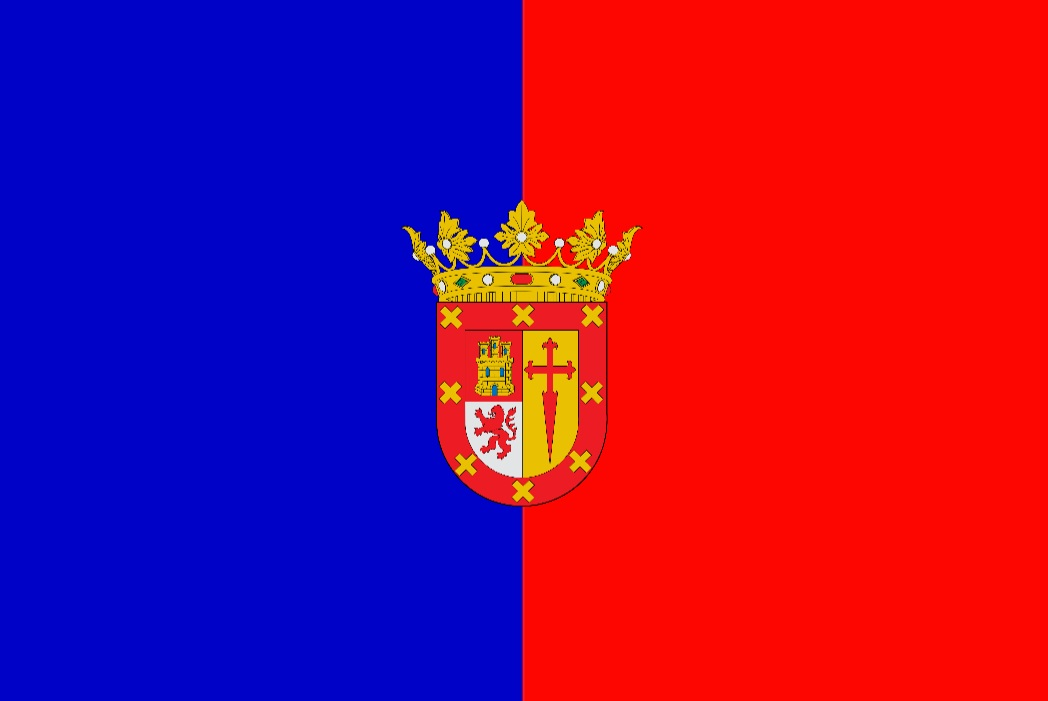
- Flag Coat of arms

- Location in Spain Villanueva del Río y Minas (Andalusia) Villanueva del Río y Minas (Spain)
- Coordinates: 37°39′N 5°42′W
- Country: Spain
- Autonomous community: Andalusia
- Province: Seville
- Comarca: Vega del Guadalquivir

Government
  - Mayor: Miguel Ángel Barrios González (PSOE)

Area
  - Total: 154 km^{2} (59 sq mi)

Population (2025-01-01)
  - Total: 5,073
  - Density: 32.9/km^{2} (85.3/sq mi)
- Time zone: UTC+1 (CET)
  - Summer (DST): UTC+2 (CEST)

Villanueva del Río y Minas is a city located in the province of Seville, Spain. According to the 2018 census (INE), the city has a population of 4096 inhabitants.

== See also ==
- List of municipalities in Seville
