= Karol Danielak =

Polish footballer

Personal information
- Date of birth: 29 September 1991 (age 35)
- Place of birth: Jarocin, Poland
- Height: 1.70 m (5 ft 7 in)
- Positions: Winger; attacking midfielder

Team information
- Current team: KKS 1925 Kalisz
- Number: 10

Youth career
- Jarota Jarocin

Senior career*
Years	Team	Apps	(Gls)
2009–2013	Jarota Jarocin	127	(11)
2014–2015	Chrobry Głogów	32	(5)
2015–2016	Pogoń Szczecin	22	(0)
2015	Pogoń Szczecin II	3	(1)
2016	Zawisza Bydgoszcz	7	(0)
2016–2018	Chrobry Głogów	59	(6)
2018–2019	Arka Gdynia	4	(0)
2019	Arka Gdynia II	13	(4)
2019–2021	Podbeskidzie	59	(14)
2021–2022	Widzew Łódź	47	(5)
2023–2025	Wieczysta Kraków	57	(11)
2025–	KKS 1925 Kalisz	30	(4)
- * Club domestic league appearances and goals as of 09:33, 31 May 2026 (UTC)

Karol Danielak (born 29 September 1991) is a Polish professional footballer who plays as a winger or attacking midfielder for III liga club KKS 1925 Kalisz.

== Career ==
=== Arka Gdynia ===
In February 2019, Danielak was demoted to the reserve team of Arka Gdynia and told to find a new club.

=== Podbeskidzie ===
On 12 June 2019, Podbeskidzie Bielsko-Biała confirmed that Danielak had joined the club on a two-year contract. He left the club at the end of his contract.

=== Widzew Łódź ===
On 2 July 2021, Danielak signed a two-year contract with Widzew Łódź. Having been put on the transfer list in late November 2022, on 9 December that year he mutually agreed to leave the club.

=== Wieczysta Kraków ===
On 20 December 2022, Danielak joined fourth division side Wieczysta Kraków on a deal until June 2025. He was released at the conclusion of the 2024–25 season.

=== KKS 1925 Kalisz ===
On 10 July 2025, Danielak signed a two-year deal with II liga club KKS 1925 Kalisz.

== Honours ==
Chrobry Głogów

- II liga West: 2013–14

Arka Gdynia

- Polish Super Cup: 2018

Wieczysta Kraków

- III liga, group IV: 2023–24
