= Marcin Włodarski =

Polish footballer and manager

Personal information
- Date of birth: 6 September 1982 (age 44)
- Place of birth: Krosno, Poland
- Height: 1.84 m (6 ft 0 in)
- Position: Midfielder

Team information
- Current team: Podbeskidzie Bielsko-Biała (manager)

Youth career
- Karpaty Krosno
- SMS Kraków
- Cracovia

Senior career*
Years	Team	Apps	(Gls)
- Wawel Kraków
- Lech Poznań II
2002	Glinik/Karpatia Gorlice		
2003–2004	Krośnianka Krosno		
2004	Błękitni Ropczyce		
2005	Tomasovia Tomaszów Lubelski		
2005	Nafta Jedlicze		
2006	Galicja Cisna		
2007–2013	Krośnianka/Karpaty Krosno		
2013–2014	Nafta Jedlicze		

Managerial career
- 2013: Karpaty Krosno (player-manager)
- 2021–2022: Poland U16 (interim)
- 2022: Poland U16
- 2022–2023: Poland U17
- 2023–2024: Poland U16
- 2023–2024: Poland U15
- 2023: Poland U17
- 2024: Poland U16
- 2024–2025: Zagłębie Lubin
- 2025–: Podbeskidzie Bielsko-Biała
- * Club domestic league appearances and goals

Marcin Włodarski (born 6 September 1982) is a Polish professional football manager and former player. He currently manages I liga club Podbeskidzie Bielsko-Biała.

== Football career ==
Marcin Włodarski began his football career in the junior team of Karpaty Krosno. He then played for SMS Kraków and Cracovia.

He began his professional career at Wawel Kraków. His subsequent clubs included Lech Poznań's reserves, Glinik/Karpatia Gorlice (2002), Krośnianka Krosno twice (2003–2004, 2007–2013 – promotion to the third league in the 2007–08 season), Błękitni Ropczyce (2004), Tomasovia Tomaszów Lubelski (2005), Nafta Jedlicze twice (2005, 2013–2014), and Galicja Cisna (2006).

== Coaching career ==
=== The beginnings ===
Włodarski, while still a football player, coached MOSiR Krosno. Then, from 20 May 2013 to 11 June 2013, he coached Karpaty Krosno.

=== Working with Poland youth teams ===
From 1 July 2018 to 30 June 2019, he served as assistant coach to Wojciech Tomaszewski at the Poland under-18 national team, to Bartłomiej Zalewski at the Poland under-15s, and to Przemysław Małecki at the Poland under-17 team.

From 1 November 2021 to 19 January 2022, he served as interim coach of the Poland under-16 national team. He led the White-and-Reds in friendly wins against the Slovenia, 4–1 and 3–1, respectively. On 19 January 2022, he was appointed coach of Poland U16. He held this position until 30 June 2022. On 1 July 2022, he took charge of the Poland U17s. He led the under-17 team to the 2023 UEFA European Under-17 Championship semi-finals, and at the 2023 FIFA U-17 World Cup.

=== Zagłębie Lubin ===
On 25 September 2024, Włodarski took up his first position in senior football, taking charge of Ekstraklasa side Zagłębie Lubin. In 2024, he was included in the list of students of the course leading to obtaining the UEFA Pro coaching license. He was dismissed on 10 March 2025.

=== Podbeskidzie Bielsko-Biała ===
On 5 November 2025, Włodarski was appointed manager of II liga club Podbeskidzie Bielsko-Biała. On 6 June 2026, Podbeskidzie, under his management, won promotion to the second division.

== Managerial statistics ==
As of match played 7 November 2026

Managerial record by team and tenure
Team	From	To	Record							
Team	From	To	G	W	D	L	GF	GA	GD	Win %
Karpaty Krosno	20 May 2013	11 June 2013	4	1	0	3	4	9	−5	25.00
Poland U16 (interim)	15 November 2021	30 June 2022	7	5	2	0	20	6	+14	71.43
Poland U17	1 July 2022	30 June 2023	17	12	0	5	55	28	+27	70.59
Poland U15	1 July 2023	30 June 2024	11	7	3	1	36	16	+20	63.64
Poland U17	1 November 2023	18 November 2023	3	0	0	3	1	9	−8	0.00
Zagłębie Lubin	25 September 2024	10 March 2025	18	5	3	10	20	27	−7	27.78
Podbeskidzie Bielsko-Biała	5 November 2025	Present	37	17	13	7	66	40	+26	45.95
Career total			97	47	21	29	202	135	+67	48.45
