= Aleksander Komor =

Polish footballer (born 1994)

Personal information
- Date of birth: 24 June 1994 (age 32)
- Place of birth: Lublin, Poland
- Height: 1.93 m (6 ft 4 in)
- Position: Centre-back

Team information
- Current team: Ruch Chorzów
- Number: 24

Youth career
- Widok Lublin

Senior career*
Years	Team	Apps	(Gls)
2012–2014	Ruch Chorzów	0	(0)
2014–2016	Motor Lublin	55	(4)
2016–2018	Górnik Łęczna	18	(0)
2018–2021	Podbeskidzie	38	(3)
2021	GKS Jastrzębie	15	(1)
2021–2023	Resovia	43	(5)
2023–2025	GKS Katowice	40	(1)
2025–	Ruch Chorzów	26	(0)
- * Club domestic league appearances and goals as of 14:51, 29 May 2026 (UTC)

Aleksander Komor (born 24 June 1994) is a Polish professional footballer who plays as a centre-back for I liga club Ruch Chorzów.

== Club career ==
=== Podbeskidzie ===
On 9 July 2018, Komor joined Polish I liga club Podbeskidzie Bielsko-Biała.

== Honours ==
Motor Lublin

- III liga Lublin–Subcarpathia: 2015–16
- Polish Cup (Lublin subdistrict regionals): 2014–15, 2015–16

GKS Katowice II

- Regional league Silesia IV: 2024–25
