= Rafał Lasocki =

Polish footballer (born 1975)

Personal information
- Full name: Rafał Lasocki
- Date of birth: 2 July 1975 (age 51)
- Place of birth: Ostrowiec Świętokrzyski, Poland
- Height: 1.83 m (6 ft 0 in)
- Position: Defender

Team information
- Current team: Poland U17 (manager)

Senior career*
| Years | Team | Apps | (Gls) |
| 1994–2002 | KSZO Ostrowiec | 45 | (4) |
| 1998 | → Świt Ćmielów (loan) | | |
| 2003–2005 | Lech Poznań | 47 | (4) |
| 2005–2006 | Dyskobolia Grodzisk | 25 | (1) |
| 2005 | → Obra Kościan (loan) | | |
| 2006 | Zawisza Bydgoszcz | 17 | (4) |
| 2007 | Śląsk Wrocław | 14 | (0) |
| 2007–2010 | Wisła Płock | 34 | (3) |
| 2008 | → Mazowsze Płock (loan) | | |
| 2010–2015 | KSZO Ostrowiec | 110 | (11) |
| 2017–2022 | Zawisza Sienno | 131 | (22) |

International career
| 2003–2004 | Poland | 3 | (1) |

Managerial career
- 2019–2022: Poland U15
- 2022–2023: Poland U16
- 2023–2024: Poland U17
- 2023–2025: Poland U15
- 2025–2026: Poland U16
- 2026–: Poland U17
- * Club domestic league appearances and goals

Rafał Lasocki (born 2 July 1975) is a Polish professional football manager and former player, currently in charge of the Poland national under-17 team.

== Career ==
Lasocki has made three appearances for the Poland national football team, scoring one goal.

== Honours ==
Lech Poznań

- Polish Cup: 2003–04
- Polish Super Cup: 2004

KSZO Ostrowiec

- IV liga Świętokrzyskie: 2012–13
