= Marcin Broniszewski =

Polish football manager

Personal information
- Date of birth: 29 August 1980 (age 46)

Team information
- Current team: Poland U20 (assistant)

Managerial career
- Years: Team
- 2008–2009: Mazur Karczew (youth)
- 2009: Zagłębie Lubin (caretaker)
- 2009–2012: Zagłębie Lubin (assistant)
- 2013: Jahn Regensburg (assistant)
- 2013–2016: Wisła Kraków (assistant)
- 2015: Wisła Kraków (caretaker)
- 2016: Wisła Kraków (caretaker)
- 2016–2017: Pogoń Siedlce
- 2017–2018: Widzew Łódź (assistant)
- 2018–2019: Górnik Łęczna (assistant)
- 2019: Górnik Łęczna
- 2020–2021: Widzew Łódź (assistant)
- 2021: Widzew Łódź
- 2021: Zagłębie Sosnowiec (assistant)
- 2023: Szturm Junikowo Poznań
- 2023–2024: Legionovia Legionowo
- 2024–2026: Mazur Karczew
- 2024–: Poland U20 (assistant)
- 2026: Wieczysta Kraków (assistant)

Marcin Broniszewski (born 29 August 1980) is a Polish professional football manager who is currently the assistant manager of the Poland national under-20 team.

== Managerial statistics ==
As of match played 22 November 2025

Managerial record by team and tenure
| Team | From | To | Record | | | | | | | |
| Team | From | To | G | W | D | L | GF | GA | GD | Win % |
|---|---|---|---|---|---|---|---|---|---|---|
| Zagłębie Lubin (caretaker) | 27 August 2009 | 31 August 2009 | 1 | 0 | 0 | 1 | 0 | 2 | −2 | 0.00 |
| Wisła Kraków (caretaker) | 30 November 2015 | 22 December 2015 | 4 | 0 | 0 | 4 | 0 | 7 | −7 | 0.00 |
| Wisła Kraków (caretaker) | 29 February 2016 | 13 March 2016 | 2 | 0 | 2 | 0 | 2 | 2 | +0 | 0.00 |
| Pogoń Siedlce | 7 December 2016 | 8 May 2017 | 10 | 2 | 2 | 6 | 11 | 20 | −9 | 20.00 |
| Górnik Łęczna | 2 April 2019 | 20 May 2019 | 8 | 2 | 1 | 5 | 10 | 13 | −3 | 25.00 |
| Widzew Łódź | 13 April 2021 | 18 June 2021 | 10 | 2 | 5 | 3 | 8 | 12 | −4 | 20.00 |
| Szturm Junikowo Poznań | 5 April 2023 | 30 June 2023 | 14 | 12 | 1 | 1 | 64 | 4 | +60 | 85.71 |
| Legionovia Legionowo | 21 August 2023 | 6 May 2024 | 27 | 9 | 4 | 14 | 40 | 50 | −10 | 33.33 |
| Mazur Karczew | 10 May 2024 | 6 January 2026 | 64 | 29 | 16 | 19 | 131 | 100 | +31 | 45.31 |
| Total | | | 140 | 56 | 31 | 53 | 266 | 210 | +56 | 40.00 |

== Honours ==
Szturm Junikowo

- Regional league Greater Poland II: 2022–23

Mazur Karczew

- V liga Masovia II: 2024–25
