= Krzysztof Brede =

Polish footballer (born 1981)

Personal information
- Full name: Krzysztof Brede
- Date of birth: 8 February 1981 (age 45)
- Place of birth: Gdynia, Poland
- Height: 1.75 m (5 ft 9 in)
- Position: Forward

Team information
- Current team: Lechia Gdańsk (assistant)

Youth career
- –2000: Lechia Gdańsk

Senior career*
Years	Team	Apps	(Gls)
2000–2002	Lech Poznań	2	(0)
2001	→ Arka Gdynia (loan)	8	(0)
2002–2003	Warmia Grajewo		
2003–2004	Gryf Wejherowo		
2004–2008	Lechia Gdańsk	83	(13)
2009	→ Olimpia Grudziądz (loan)	14	(0)
2009–2011	Olimpia Grudziądz	63	(1)
2011–2012	Lechia Gdańsk II	26	(1)
2023–2024	Tylko Lechia Gdańsk	10	(1)

Managerial career
- 2017–2018: Chojniczanka Chojnice
- 2018–2020: Podbeskidzie Bielsko-Biała
- 2022–2024: Chojniczanka Chojnice
- 2024–2025: Podbeskidzie Bielsko-Biała
- * Club domestic league appearances and goals

Krzysztof Brede (born 8 February 1981) is a Polish professional football manager and former player who played as a forward. He is currently the assistant manager of I liga club Lechia Gdańsk.

He spent most of his career playing with Lechia Gdańsk, also making appearances with Arka Gdynia, Warmia Grajewo, Gryf Wejherowo and Olimpia Grudziądz.

== Playing career ==
=== Early years ===
Brede started his career with the youth teams of Lechia Gdańsk, moving to Lech Poznań during the summer of 2000. After a season with Lechia he spent 6 months on loan at Arka Gdynia making 8 appearances in total, leaving Lech at the end of the season. He spent a season with Warmia Grajewo, with Brede playing in a memorable cup game against ŁKS Łódź, with the team securing an unlikely draw after extra time, before losing in penalties. The season after Brede played with Gryf Wejherowo.

=== Lechia Gdańsk ===
During the summer of 2004 Brede joined Lechia Gdańsk, making his debut against the Pogoń Szczecin second team on 11 September 2004. In his first season with Lechia he played 21 times, contributing 2 goals as Lechia won the league. Brede spent the next 3 seasons with Lechia in the II liga playing 62 appearances during this period. Brede made 3 appearances for Lechia as they won promotion back to the Ekstraklasa for the first time as an independent club in 20 years. With Lechia in the Ekstraklasa Brede found himself playing with the Under 21's team.

=== Later years ===
After finding himself out of the first team, Brede joined Olimpia Grudziądz during the winter transfer window. In his first season he helped Olimpia to win the III liga. In total for Olimpia Brede made 77 appearances scoring one goal. In 2011 Brede returned to Lechia, this time to play with the Lechia Gdańsk II team. After a season in which he made 26 appearances Brede retired from professional football.

== Coaching ==
=== Coaching career ===
Brede started coaching shortly after his retirement joining Lechia Gdańsk's coaching team as an assistant in June 2012. He left in March 2014, joining Jagiellonia Białystok's management staff in June the same year.

=== Managerial career ===
After three years with the Jagiellonia team Brede joined Chojniczanka Chojnice in his first managerial job. Brede was given the position as manager on a one-year contract with an extension if the team were to win promotion. After a 4th-place finish his contract was not renewed and Brede left at the end of the season. Brede was not out of employment for long, securing the role of being Podbeskidzie Bielsko-Biała's manager. In his first season with Podbeskidzie the team finished 6th.

He won promotion with Podbeskidzie to Ekstraklasa in 2020. In December 2020, his contract was terminated.

On 24 November 2022, Chojniczanka appointed Brede as manager for the second time, on a year-and-a-half contract. He left the club on 17 June 2024, after receiving an offer to return to Podbeskidzie and having his contract bought out.

Hours later, he was confirmed as the new manager of Podbeskidzie. On 5 October 2025, a day after a 2–3 home loss to Warta Poznań, Brede was dismissed.

On 3 July 2026, Brede returned to Lechia Gdańsk as an assistant manager under newly appointed Vladyslav Lupashko.

== Managerial statistics ==
As of match played 4 October 2025

Managerial record by team and tenure
Team	From	To	Record							
Team	From	To	G	W	D	L	GF	GA	GD	Win %
Chojniczanka Chojnice	10 June 2017	4 June 2018	39	19	8	12	58	41	+17	48.72
Podbeskidzie Bielsko-Biała	18 June 2018	15 December 2020	86	36	20	30	135	123	+12	41.86
Chojniczanka Chojnice	24 November 2022	17 June 2024	53	18	15	20	69	76	−7	33.96
Podbeskidzie Bielsko-Biała	17 June 2024	5 October 2025	49	20	12	17	66	57	+9	40.82
Total			227	93	55	79	328	297	+31	40.97

== Honours ==
Lechia Gdańsk

- II liga: 2007–08
- III liga (group II): 2004–05

Olimpia Grudziądz

- III liga Kuyavia-Pomerania – Greater Poland: 2008–09

Tylko Lechia Gdańsk

- Klasa B Gdańsk II: 2023–24
