= Kacper Gach =

Polish footballer (born 1998)

Personal information
- Date of birth: 11 July 1998 (age 28)
- Place of birth: Żywiec, Poland
- Height: 1.78 m (5 ft 10 in)
- Position: Left-back

Team information
- Current team: Podbeskidzie
- Number: 22

Youth career
- –2018: Podbeskidzie

Senior career*
Years	Team	Apps	(Gls)
2018–2022	Podbeskidzie	56	(3)
2021	→ Widzew Łódź (loan)	13	(0)
2022–2023	Sandecja Nowy Sącz	5	(0)
2023	Rekord Bielsko-Biała	11	(1)
2023–2024	Wikęd Luzino	20	(0)
2024–	Podbeskidzie	54	(2)
- * Club domestic league appearances and goals as of 14:45, 6 June 2026 (UTC)

Kacper Gach (born 11 July 1998) is a Polish professional footballer who plays as a left-back for I liga club Podbeskidzie Bielsko-Biała.
