= Tomasz Nowak (footballer) =

Polish footballer (born 1985)

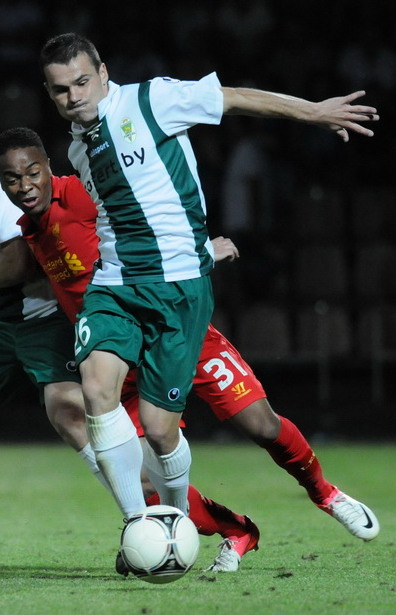
- Nowak with Gomel in 2012

Personal information
- Date of birth: 30 October 1985 (age 41)
- Place of birth: Kościan, Poland
- Height: 1.71 m (5 ft 7 in)
- Position: Midfielder

Team information
- Current team: Sarmacja Będzin
- Number: 6

Youth career
- Obra Kościan
- Amica Wronki

Senior career*
| Years | Team | Apps | (Gls) |
| 2003–2005 | Amica Wronki II | | |
| 2006 | Kania Gostyń | | |
| 2007–2010 | Korona Kielce | 56 | (1) |
| 2009–2010 | → Polonia Bytom (loan) | 30 | (1) |
| 2011 | Górnik Łęczna | 16 | (5) |
| 2011–2012 | ŁKS Łódź | 13 | (0) |
| 2012 | Gomel | 24 | (3) |
| 2013–2016 | Górnik Łęczna | 116 | (10) |
| 2016–2019 | Zagłębie Sosnowiec | 80 | (13) |
| 2019–2021 | Podbeskidzie | 30 | (5) |
| 2021 | → Rekord Bielsko-Biała (loan) | 18 | (6) |
| 2021–2025 | Rekord Bielsko-Biała | 129 | (25) |
| 2025– | Sarmacja Będzin | 23 | (8) |

International career
| 2010 | Poland | 3 | (1) |
- * Club domestic league appearances and goals as of 21:08, 30 June 2026 (UTC)

Tomasz Nowak (born 30 October 1985) is a Polish professional footballer who plays as a midfielder for regional league club Sarmacja Będzin.

== Club career ==
=== Korona Kielce ===
Nowak joined Korona Kielce in the 2006–07 winter break from Kania Gostyń. For the 2009–10 season, he was loaned to Polonia Bytom.

=== Górnik Łęczna ===
In February 2011, he joined Górnik Łęczna on a half-year deal.

=== ŁKS Łódź ===
On 13 June 2011, Nowak joined Polish Ekstraklasa side ŁKS Łódź on a free transfer from Górnik Łęczna. He signed a two-year deal.

=== Podbeskidzie ===
Ahead of the 2019–20 season, Nowak joined Podbeskidzie Bielsko-Biała.

== International career ==
Nowak was a part of Poland national team, for which he has played three times and scored one goal.

== Career statistics ==
=== International ===
Appearances and goals by national team and year
| National team | Year | Apps | Goals |
|---|---|---|---|
Poland
| Poland | 2010 | 3 | 1 |
| Total | | 3 | 1 |

== Honours ==
Rekord Bielsko-Biała

- III liga, group III: 2023–24
- Polish Cup (Silesia regionals): 2020–21, 2021–22
- Polish Cup (Bielsko-Biała regionals): 2020–21, 2021–22
