= Robert Podoliński =

Polish football manager

Personal information
- Date of birth: 8 October 1975 (age 51)
- Place of birth: Siemiatycze, Poland

Senior career*
Years	Team	Apps	(Gls)
- Cresovia Siemiatycze
- AZS-AWF Warsaw
- KS Piaseczno
- Gwardia Warsaw
- Mazowsze Grójec

Managerial career
- 2005–2006: MKS Piaseczno
- 2006–2007: Korona Góra Kalwaria
- 2007–2008: Mazur Karczew
- 2008–2009: Nida Pińczów
- 2009–2010: Bug Wyszków
- 2010–2011: Znicz Pruszków
- 2011–2014: Dolcan Ząbki
- 2014–2015: Cracovia
- 2015–2016: Podbeskidzie Bielsko-Biała
- 2017: Radomiak Radom
- * Club domestic league appearances and goals

Robert Podoliński (born 8 October 1975) is a Polish football pundit, commentator, former manager and player.
