= Dawid Banaczek =

Polish footballer (born 1979)

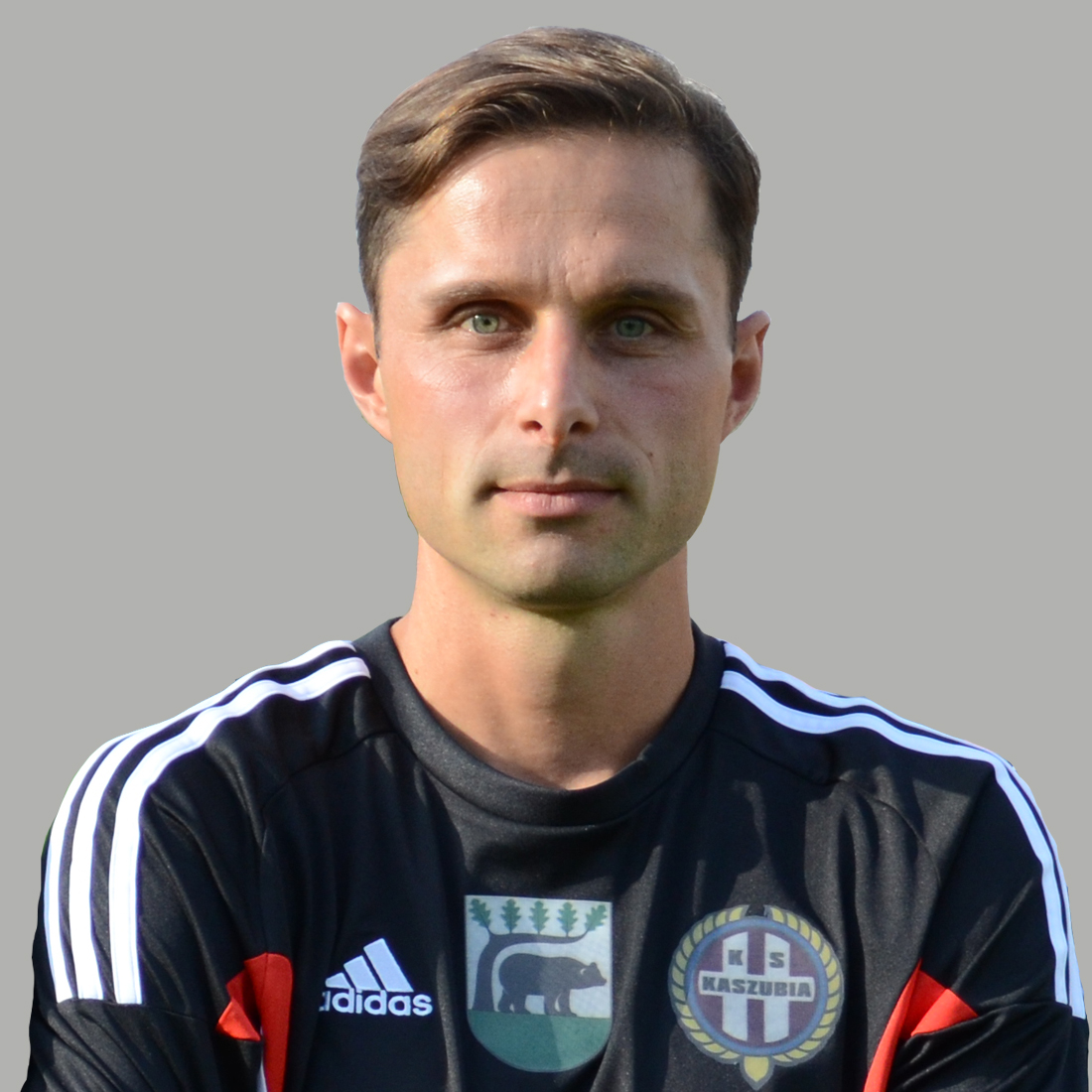

Personal information
- Date of birth: 3 June 1979 (age 47)
- Place of birth: Gdynia, Poland
- Height: 1.86 m (6 ft 1 in)
- Position: Forward

Youth career
- 1987–1996: Lechia Gdańsk

Senior career*
Years	Team	Apps	(Gls)
1996–1999	Lechia Gdańsk		
1999–2001	Bayern Munich II	46	(6)
2001	IFK Norrköping	8	(2)
2002	RKS Radomsko	12	(2)
2002–2003	IFK Norrköping	25	(2)
2003	Widzew Łódź	2	(0)
2004	FC Vaduz		
2004	Ethnikos Asteras	9	(1)
2005	Amica Wronki	5	(2)
2005–2007	Zagłębie Lubin	18	(1)
2007	Sigma Olomouc	4	(0)
2008	Viktoria Köln		
2008–2010	Kaszubia Kościerzyna	49	(16)
2010–2011	Orkan Rumia	14	(9)
2019	AS Pomorze Gdańsk		

International career
1996–2000	Poland U16–U21		

Managerial career
- 2012–2013: Lechia Gdańsk (U9)
- 2013–2014: Kaszubia Kościerzyna
- 2015: Lechia Gdańsk (U17)
- 2015–2016: Lechia Gdańsk (assistant)
- 2015–2016: Lechia Gdańsk (caretaker)
- 2016: Lechia Gdańsk (U19)
- 2016–2017: Bytovia Bytów (assistant)
- * Club domestic league appearances and goals

Dawid Banaczek (born 3 June 1979) is a Polish former professional footballer who played as an attacking midfielder or forward.

== Early life ==
Dawid was born in Gdynia and grew up in Gdańsk (both being parts of Tricity urban area in Poland). Dawid's father, Ryszard, was a rugby Polish national team player and then a rugby coach in Lechia Gdańsk, while his mother Barbara was a volleyball player. Dawid is the eldest of two boys.

== Early career ==
Banaczek made his first appearance for Lechia Gdańsk where he began his trainings in 1987. As a teenager, Banaczek represented Poland U16 to U21. In 1995, he participated in the U16 European Championships, held in Belgium.

== Playing career ==
He had played in the Lechia senior team for three seasons. In 1999, Banaczek signed a 2-year contract with Bayern Munich II. In the new club, Dawid played for two seasons for the reserves team.

In 2001, he had signed a contract with the Swedish club IFK Norrköping in which he debuted in Allsvenskan. Between 2001 and 2003, Banaczek (with a short, three-month interval in RKS Radomsko), played continuously for the IFK.

In 2005, he moved to Ekstraklasa side Amica Wronki. Under supervision of coach Maciej Skorża, he spent one round as a substitute.

He enjoyed his greatest successes as a player in Zagłębie Lubin, with whom, in the 2006–07 season, he won the championship of Poland. A year prior, Zagłębie finished the season in 3rd. Beside Zagłębie and Amica Wronki, Banaczek played in two more teams of the Ekstraklasa: RKS Radomsko and Widzew Łódź.

The last high-level stop in his football career was the Czech team Sigma Olomouc, whom he joined in 2007.

== National team ==
He was repeatedly a member of Polish youth national teams, from U15 to U21. In 1995, under coach Andrzej Zamilski, he participated in the European U16 Championship in Belgium.

== Managerial career ==
=== Lechia Gdańsk ===
In 2012, Dawid Banaczek started cooperation with Lechia Gdańsk, where he led the team of the Lechia Gdańsk Football Academy U9.

=== Kaszubia Koscierzyna ===
On 1 July 2013, Banaczek assumed the position of the head coach of the Kaszubia Kościerzyna, on a one-year deal.

=== Lechia Gdańsk ===
From July to August 2015 he was the head coach of Lechia Gdańsk's U17 team.

After 8 weeks of working with U17s, he became the assistant for Thomas von Heesen in the senior team. Following von Heesen's dismissal, he became the caretaker manager on 3 December 2015.

From 1 July 2016, he was an assistant coach of Drutex Bytovia Bytów.

== Personal life ==
Dawid is married to Anna Iga. Together they have a daughter Laura, who is an artistic gymnast in SGA Gdynia.

In 2011, Dawid Banaczek has established the Football Pro Academy. The principal goal of the academy, to be achieved within several years, is to search for talents and children with passion and enthusiasm to practice this sport, and subsequently, beginning of trainings on a more advanced level.

Banaczek speaks English and German.

== Honours ==
Vaduz

- Liechtenstein Cup: 2003–04

Zagłębie Lubin

- Ekstraklasa: 2006–07
