= Lora del Río =

- city
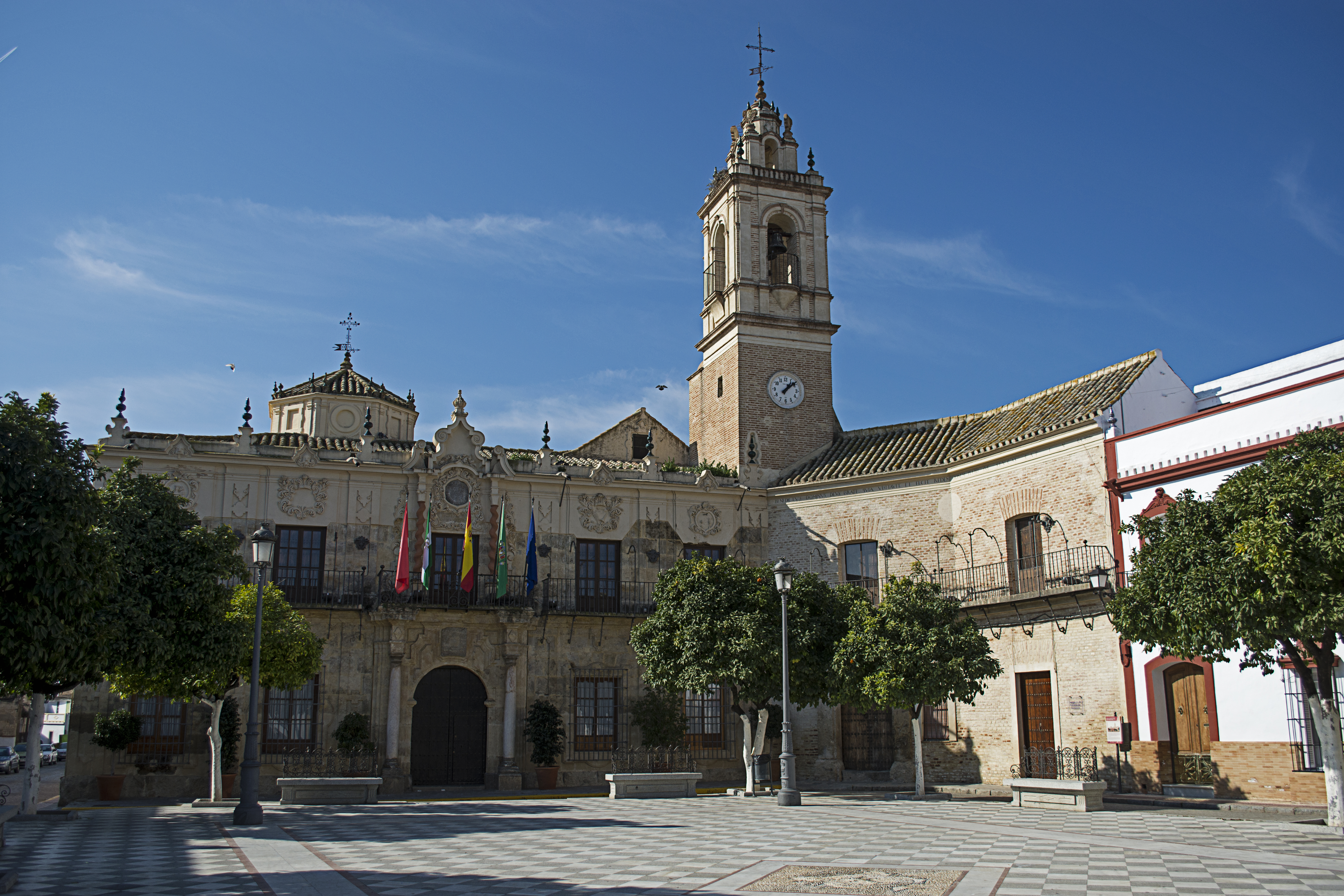
- Municipal office

- Flag Coat of arms

- Location in Spain Lora del Río (Province of Seville)
- Coordinates: 37°39′N 5°31′W
- Country: Spain
- Province: Seville
- Comarca: Vega del Guadalquivir

Area
  - Total: 292 km^{2} (113 sq mi)
- Elevation: 38 m (125 ft)

Population (2025-01-01)
  - Total: 18,122
  - Density: 62.1/km^{2} (161/sq mi)
- Time zone: UTC+1 (CET)

Lora del Río is a city and municipality located in the province of Seville, Spain. According to the 2006 census by INE, it has a population of 19,077 inhabitants.

== Geography ==
The municipality of Lora del Río (Sevilla) is one of 104 municipalities is the province of Sevilla within Guadalquivir valley, to the east of Seville, which is about 57 kilometres away.

== Notable people ==
- Juan de Cervantes (c. 1380 or 1382 – 25 November 1453) was one of the Catholic Church's cardinals
- Kevin López (born 12 June 1990) was a middle-distance runner

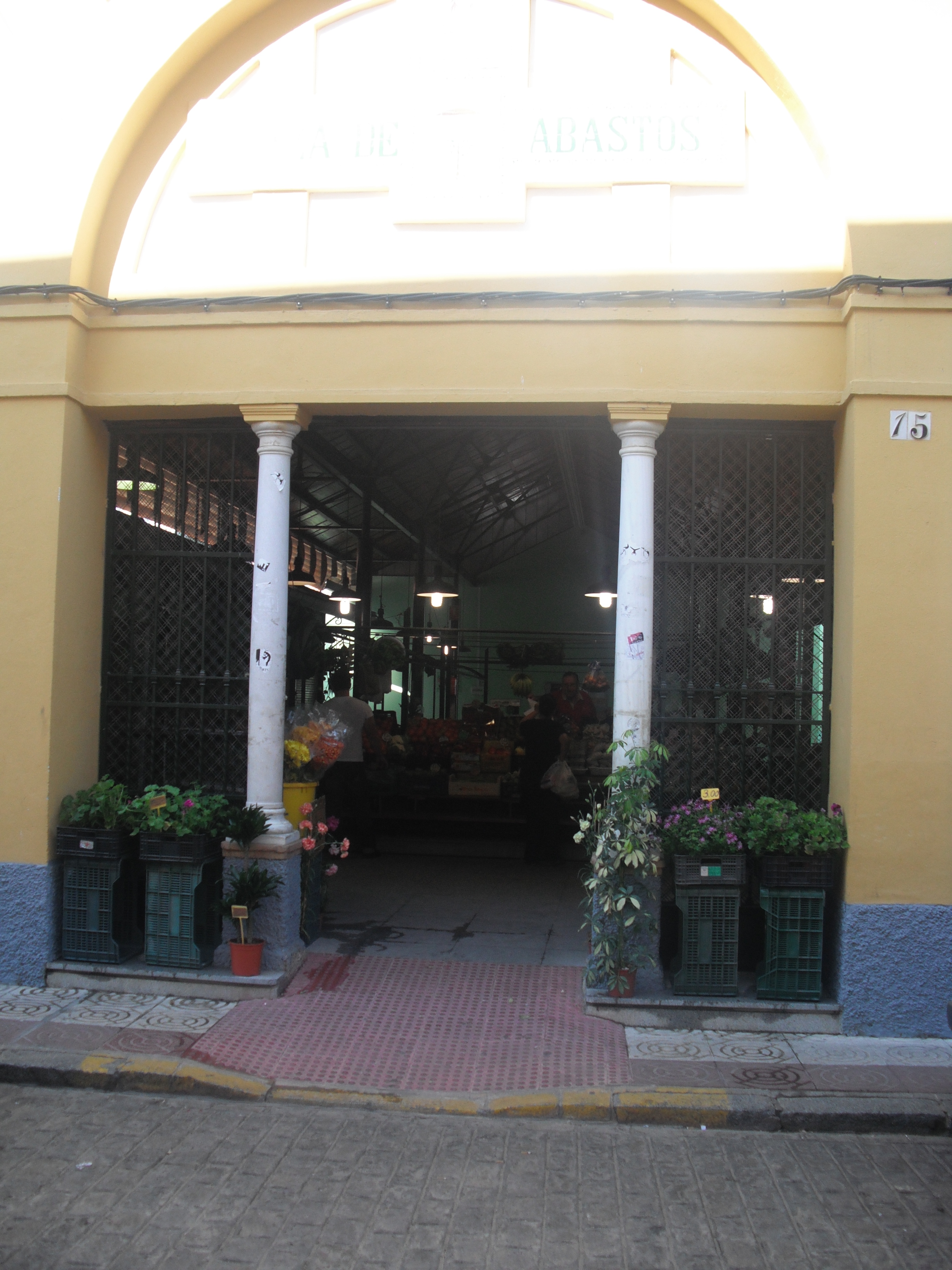
Entrance to the market hall in Lora del Río

== See also ==
- List of municipalities in Seville
