= Nemanja Nikolić =

Nemanja Nikolić may refer to:

- Nemanja Nikolić (footballer, born 1987), Serbian-Hungarian footballer
- Nemanja Nikolić (footballer, born 1988), Montenegrin footballer
- Nemanja Nikolić (footballer, born 1992), Serbian footballer
- Nemanja Nikolić (footballer, born 2001), Bosnian footballer
