= Poland national under-17 football team =

Poland Under-17
- Nickname(s): Biało-czerwoni (The White and Reds); Białe Orły (The White Eagles)
- Association: Polish Football Association (Polski Związek Piłki Nożnej)
- Confederation: UEFA (Europe)
- Head coach: Rafał Lasocki
- Most caps: Patryk Prajsnar (25)
- FIFA code: POL
First colours	Second colours

FIFA U-17 World Cup
- Appearances: 3 (first in 1993)
- Best result: Fourth place (1993)

UEFA European Under-17 Championship
- Appearances: 5 (first in 2002)
- Best result: Semi-final (2012, 2023)

The Poland national under-17 football team represents Poland in international football at this age level and is controlled by Polish Football Association.

This team is for Polish players aged 17 or under at the start of a two-year European Under-17 Football Championship campaign.

== Competitive record ==
*Denotes draws include knockout matches decided on penalty kicks.
Gold background colour indicates that the tournament was won.
Silver background colour indicates second place finish.
Bronze background colour indicates third place finish.
Red border color indicates tournament was held on home soil.

=== UEFA European U-17 Championship ===
UEFA European Under-17 Championship record
Year	Round	Pld	W	D *	L	GF	GA
(Denmark) 2002	Group stage	3	1	1	1	4	3
(Portugal) 2003	Did not qualify						
(France) 2004	Did not qualify						
(Italy) 2005	Did not qualify						
(Luxembourg) 2006	Did not qualify						
(Belgium) 2007	Did not qualify						
(Turkey) 2008	Did not qualify						
(Germany) 2009	Did not qualify						
(Liechtenstein) 2010	Did not qualify						
(Serbia) 2011	Did not qualify						
(Slovenia) 2012	Semi-finals	4	1	2	1	2	2
(Slovakia) 2013	Did not qualify						
(Malta) 2014	Did not qualify						
(Bulgaria) 2015	Did not qualify						
(Azerbaijan) 2016	Did not qualify						
(Croatia) 2017	Did not qualify						
(England) 2018	Did not qualify						
(Republic of Ireland) 2019	Did not qualify						
(Estonia) 2020	Cancelled due to COVID-19 pandemic						
(Cyprus) 2021	Cancelled due to COVID-19 pandemic						
(Israel) 2022	Group stage	3	0	1	2	3	9
(Hungary) 2023	Semi-finals	5	3	0	2	16	14
(Cyprus) 2024	Quarter-finals	4	1	1	2	7	6
(Albania) 2025	Did not qualify						
(Estonia) 2026	Did not qualify						
(Latvia) 2027	To be determined						
(Lithuania) 2028	To be determined						
(Moldova) 2029	To be determined						
Total:5/23	Semi-finals	19	6	5	8	32	34

=== FIFA U-17 World Cup ===
FIFA U-17 World Cup record
Year	Round	Pld	W	D *	L	GF	GA
(China) 1985	Did not qualify						
(Canada) 1987	Did not qualify						
(Scotland) 1989	Did not qualify						
(Italy) 1991	Did not qualify						
(Japan) 1993	Fourth place	6	3	2	1	13	7
(Ecuador) 1995	Did not qualify						
(Egypt) 1997	Did not qualify						
(New Zealand) 1999	Group stage	3	0	2	1	3	4
(Trinidad and Tobago) 2001	Did not qualify						
(Finland) 2003	Did not qualify						
(Peru) 2005	Did not qualify						
(South Korea) 2007	Did not qualify						
(Nigeria) 2009	Did not qualify						
(Mexico) 2011	Did not qualify						
(United Arab Emirates) 2013	Did not qualify						
(Chile) 2015	Did not qualify						
(India) 2017	Did not qualify						
(Brazil) 2019	Did not qualify						
(Indonesia) 2023	Group stage	3	0	0	3	1	9
(Qatar) 2025	Did not qualify						
(Qatar) 2026	Did not qualify						
(Qatar) 2027	To be determined						
(Qatar) 2028	To be determined						
(Qatar) 2029	To be determined						
Total:3/21	Fourth place	12	3	4	5	17	20

== Results and fixtures ==
The following is a list of match results from the last 12 months, as well as any future matches that have been scheduled.

Win Draw Loss Fixture

18 February 2026 Friendly	Poland	2–0	Estonia	San Pedro del Pinatar, Spain
14:00 CET (UTC+01:00)	Smyrak 20'; Zalewski 40'	Report		Stadium: Pinatar Arena; Referee: Juan Antonio Campos Salinas (Spain)

21 February 2026 Friendly	Poland	4–2	Scotland	San Pedro del Pinatar, Spain
11:00 CET (UTC+01:00)	Zalewski 34'; Płocica 38'; Kapusta 42'; Smyrak 67'	Report	Cameron; McLaughlin	Stadium: Pinatar Arena; Referee: Joaquín Béjar Caballero (Spain)

23 February 2026 Friendly	Poland	1–1	Sweden	San Pedro del Pinatar, Spain
17:00 CET (UTC+01:00)	Cecuła 54'	Report	Santos 90'	Stadium: Pinatar Arena; Referee: Fulgencio Madrid Martínez (Spain)

25 March 2026 2026 UEFA Euro Under-17 qualifying	Republic of Ireland	3–0	Poland	Brzeg, Poland
15:00 CET (UTC+01:00)	Murphy 45+1'; Byrne 48'; Sheridan 84'	Report		Stadium: MOSiR Brzeg; Attendance: 357; Referee: Yura Mahtesyan (Armenia)

28 March 2026 2026 UEFA Euro Under-17 qualifying	Slovakia	0–4	Poland	Brzeg, Poland
13:00 CET (UTC+01:00)		Report	Buchta 5'; Szywała 6', 55' (pen.); Zalewski 57'	Stadium: MOSiR Brzeg; Referee: Yura Mahtesyan (Armenia)

31 March 2026 2026 UEFA Euro Under-17 qualifying	Poland	1–1	Croatia	Opole, Poland
16:00 CEST (UTC+02:00)	Buchta 38'	Report	Dedić 73'	Stadium: Itaka Arena; Attendance: 1,657; Referee: Ioannis Christodoulou (Cyprus)

25 September 2026 2026 Syrenka Cup	Poland	4–1	Czech Republic	Grodzisk Mazowiecki, Poland
11:00 CEST (UTC+02:00)	Madej 17'; Kowalski 50'; Leśniak 82'; Brzózka 85'	Report	Cimpl 23' (pen.)	Stadium: Municipal Stadium; Referee: Damian Gawęcki (Poland)

27 September 2026 2026 Syrenka Cup	Poland	2–1	Republic of Ireland	Ząbki, Poland
11:00 CEST (UTC+02:00)	Stępniewski 8'; Putrzyński 58'	Report	Keating 20'	Stadium: Dozbud Arena; Referee: Kamil Chmielewski (Poland)

30 September 2026 2026 Syrenka Cup	Poland	3–1	Georgia	Grodzisk Mazowiecki, Poland
11:00 CEST (UTC+02:00)	Brzeziński 9'; Kowalski 82'; Madej 83'	Report	Dumbadze 30'	Stadium: Municipal Stadium; Referee: Grzegorz Kawałko (Poland)

11 November 2026 2027 UEFA Euro Under-17 qualifying	Ukraine	3–2	Poland	Burton upon Trent, England
20:00 CET (UTC+01:00)	Dzyurynets 38', 71'; Rybak 76'	Report	Leśniak 51'; Bakhno 59'	Stadium: St George's Park National Football Centre; Attendance: 72; Referee: Karl Koppel (Estonia)

14 November 2026 2027 UEFA Euro Under-17 qualifying	Poland	0–2	England	Burton upon Trent, England
15:00 CET (UTC+01:00)		Report	Blake 34'; Abe 83'	Stadium: St George's Park National Football Centre; Attendance: 185; Referee: Mateo Tozan (Slovenia)

17 November 2026 2027 UEFA Euro Under-17 qualifying	Poland	6–3	Montenegro	Burton upon Trent, England
19:30 CET (UTC+01:00)	Madej 8' (pen.), 41', 45+1' (pen.); Stępniewski 49'; Garwoliński 53', 76'	Report	Milačić 22', 82'; Vukčević 24'	Stadium: St George's Park National Football Centre; Attendance: 28; Referee: Mateo Tozan (Slovenia)

== Coaching history ==
- Andrzej Zamilski (1993–1994)
- Michał Globisz (1999–2000)
- Andrzej Zamilski 2001–2002)
- Władysław Żmuda (2009–2010)
- Marcin Dorna (2010–2013)
- Bartłomiej Zalewski (2015–2016)
- Robert Wójcik (2017)
- Bartłomiej Zalewski (2017–2018)
- Przemysław Małecki (2018–2019)
- Marcin Dorna (2019–2020)
- Maciej Stolarczyk (2020)
- Marcin Dorna (2020–2021)
- Dariusz Gęsior (2021–2022)
- Marcin Włodarski (2022–2023)
- Rafał Lasocki (2023–2024)
- Marcin Włodarski (2023)
- Dariusz Gęsior (2024–2025)
- Piotr Kobierecki (2025–2026)
- Rafał Lasocki (2026–present)

== Current squad ==
The following players were selected for the 2027 UEFA Euro Under-17 qualifying matches against Ukraine, England and Montenegro on 11, 14 and 17 November 2026.

Caps and goals updated as of 17 November 2026 after the match against Montenegro.

No.	Pos.	Player	Date of birth (age)	Caps	Goals	Club
1	GK	Antoni Miernik	24 February 2011 (age 15)	0	0	(The Football Association) Chelsea
12	GK	Antoni Fojut	12 August 2010 (age 16)	4	0	(Polish Football Association) Pogoń Szczecin
22	GK	Franciszek Golański	15 April 2010 (age 16)	2	0	(Polish Football Association) Widzew Łódź
2	DF	Bartosz Kowalski	2010 (age 15–16)	4	2	(Royal Spanish Football Federation) Espanyol
3	DF	Mateusz Grygier	20 February 2010 (age 16)	5	0	(Polish Football Association) KS Goczałkowice-Zdrój
4	DF	Adrian Jaster	10 May 2010 (age 16)	4	0	(Polish Football Association) Pogoń Szczecin
5	DF	Oskar Putrzyński	7 January 2010 (age 16)	4	1	(Polish Football Association) Legia Warsaw
7	DF	Kacper Kopijka	9 January 2010 (age 16)	4	0	(Polish Football Association) Wisła Kraków
6	MF	Przemysław Mazan	10 April 2010 (age 16)	5	0	(Polish Football Association) Śląsk Wrocław
10	MF	Jan Głąb	20 July 2010 (age 16)	6	0	(Polish Football Association) Widzew Łódź II
11	MF	Igor Brzeziński	20 January 2010 (age 16)	5	1	(Polish Football Association) Legia Warsaw
13	MF	Łukasz Zajączkowski	26 May 2010 (age 16)	1	0	(Polish Football Association) Śląsk Wrocław II
14	MF	Maciej Malecki	9 January 2010 (age 16)	3	0	(Polish Football Association) Lech Poznań
15	MF	Serafim Bakhno	6 January 2010 (age 16)	6	1	(Polish Football Association) Lech Poznań II
16	MF	Xavier Dąbkowski	2 September 2010 (age 16)	5	0	(Polish Football Association) Legia Warsaw
17	MF	Oliwier Madej	9 July 2010 (age 16)	6	5	(Polish Football Association) Stal Rzeszów
18	MF	Dawid Świątek	26 January 2010 (age 16)	5	0	(Polish Football Association) Górnik Zabrze
19	MF	Tymoteusz Leśniak	10 March 2010 (age 16)	6	2	(Polish Football Association) Legia Warsaw
20	MF	Franciszek Stępniewski	5 January 2010 (age 16)	6	2	(Polish Football Association) Legia Warsaw II
21	MF	Adam Garwoliński	21 January 2010 (age 16)	6	2	(Polish Football Association) FASE Szczecin
23	MF	Marcel Laszczyk	10 February 2010 (age 16)	5	0	(Polish Football Association) Legia Warsaw II

=== Recent call-ups ===
The following players (born in 2010 or later) have previously been called up to the Poland under-17 squad in the last 12 months and are still eligible to represent:

Pos.	Player	Date of birth (age)	Caps	Goals	Club	Latest call-up
GK	Aleks Olsztyn	23 February 2010 (age 16)	1	0	(Poland) Lech Poznań	v. Ukraine, 11 November 2026 ^{WD}
DF	Norbert Białooki	7 April 2010 (age 16)	2	0	(Poland) Polonia Warsaw	v. Georgia, 30 September 2026
MF	Kornel Brzózka	13 April 2010 (age 16)	3	1	(Poland) Jagiellonia Białystok	v. Ukraine, 11 November 2026 ^{WD}
FW	Dawid Rutkowski	10 April 2010 (age 16)	3	0	(United States) New York Red Bulls	v. Georgia, 30 September 2026
FW	Marko Gasiorowski	25 April 2010 (age 16)	0	0	(England) Bournemouth	v. Czech Republic, 25 September 2026 ^{WD}
^{WD} Withdrew from the squad.

== See also ==
- Poland national football team
- Poland Olympic football team
- Poland national under-21 football team
- Poland national under-20 football team
- Poland national under-19 football team
- Poland national under-18 football team
- Poland national under-16 football team
