= Łukasz Sierpina =

Polish footballer

Personal information
- Full name: Łukasz Sierpina
- Date of birth: 27 March 1988 (age 38)
- Place of birth: Złotoryja, Poland
- Height: 1.74 m (5 ft 9 in)
- Position: Left midfielder

Team information
- Current team: GKS Raciborowice
- Number: 11

Youth career
- –2007: Czarni Rokitki

Senior career*
Years	Team	Apps	(Gls)
2008	Proszowianka Proszowice		
2008–2011	Górnik Polkowice	72	(5)
2011–2012	Dolcan Ząbki	27	(3)
2012–2016	Korona Kielce	60	(2)
2014	→ Dolcan Ząbki (loan)	21	(3)
2016–2021	Podbeskidzie	145	(18)
2021–2023	Korona Kielce	24	(0)
2022	Korona Kielce II	2	(0)
2023	Kotwica Kołobrzeg	10	(0)
2023–2024	Karkonosze Jelenia Góra	17	(3)
2024	Korona Piaski	14	(2)
2024–2025	Legsad Kościelec	29	(34)
2025–	GKS Raciborowice	35	(20)
- * Club domestic league appearances and goals as of 08:29, 10 September 2026 (UTC)

Łukasz Sierpina (born 27 March 1988) is a Polish professional footballer who plays as a left midfielder for IV liga Lower Silesia club GKS Raciborowice.

== Honours ==
Górnik Polkowice

- III liga Lower Silesia-Lubusz: 2008–09

Legsad Kościelec

- Regional league Legnica: 2024–25

GKS Raciborowice

- Regional league Jelenia Góra: 2025–26
- Polish Cup (Jelenia Góra regionals): 2025–26
