= Wojciech Borecki =

Polish footballer

Personal information
- Date of birth: 4 April 1955 (age 71)
- Place of birth: Bielsk Podlaski, Poland

Managerial career
- Years: Team
- 1991–1994: Stal Bielsko-Biała
- 1994–1996: Beskid Skoczów
- 1996–1999: Pasjonat Dankowice
- 1999–2001: Podbeskidzie Bielsko-Biała
- 2001: Włókniarz Kietrz
- 2001–2002: Podbeskidzie Bielsko-Biała
- 2003: Podbeskidzie Bielsko-Biała
- 2003–2004: ŁKS Łódź
- 2004: GKS Katowice
- 2004: Piast Gliwice
- 2005–2006: GKS Jastrzębie
- 2006–2007: KSZO Ostrowiec Świętokrzyski
- 2007: ŁKS Łódź
- 2008–2010: Rekord Bielsko-Biała
- 2010: GKS Jastrzębie
- 2010–2011: Resovia
- 2012–2016: Podbeskidzie Bielsko-Biała (chairman)

Wojciech Borecki (born 4 April 1955) is a Polish football executive and manager.
