= Marcel Zapytowski =

Polish footballer

Personal information
- Date of birth: 8 January 2001 (age 25)
- Place of birth: Płock, Poland
- Height: 1.89 m (6 ft 2 in)
- Position: Goalkeeper

Team information
- Current team: Egersund
- Number: 1

Youth career
- –2018: Wisła Płock

Senior career*
Years	Team	Apps	(Gls)
2018–2020	Wisła Płock II	11	(0)
2018–2020	Wisła Płock	2	(0)
2020–2021	Resovia	26	(0)
2021–2024	Korona Kielce	25	(0)
2021–2025	Korona Kielce II	26	(0)
2023–2024	→ Birkirkara (loan)	25	(0)
2025–2026	ÍBV	29	(0)
2026–	Egersund	11	(0)
- * Club domestic league appearances and goals as of 14 November 2026

Marcel Zapytowski (born 8 January 2001) is a Polish professional footballer who plays as a goalkeeper for Norwegian First Division club Egersund.

== Career ==
On 3 January 2020, Zapytowski officially joined II liga club Resovia.

== Honours ==
Wisła Płock II

- Polish Cup (Płock regionals): 2018–19

Korona Kielce II

- IV liga Świętokrzyskie: 2021–22
