= Villaverde del Río =

- city
- Seal

- Location in the Province of Séville Location in Andalusia Location in Spain
- Coordinates: 37°35′17″N 5°52′24″W
- Country: Spain
- Autonomes community: Andalusia
- Province: Seville
- Comarca: Vega del Guadalquivir

Area
  - Total: 41 km^{2} (16 sq mi)
- Elevation: 17 m (56 ft)

Population (2025-01-01)
  - Total: 7,885
  - Density: 190/km^{2} (500/sq mi)
- Time zone: UTC+1 (CET)
  - Summer (DST): UTC+2 (CEST)

Villaverde del Río is a city located in the province of Seville, Spain. According to the 2005 census (INE), the city has a population of 6685 inhabitants.

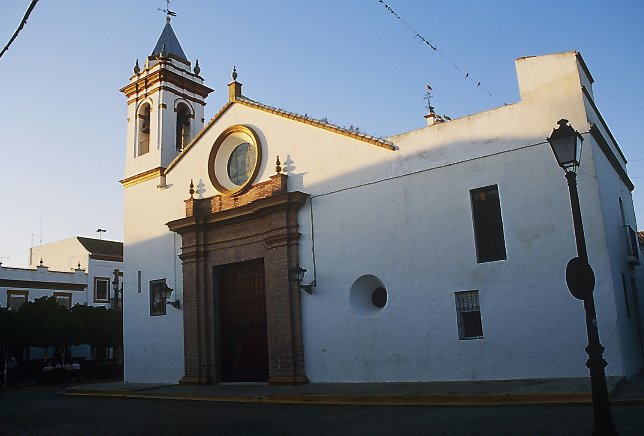
Church of Villaverde del Río, Seville, Spain.

== See also ==
- List of municipalities in Seville
