= Konrad Forenc =

Polish footballer (born 1992)

Personal information
- Date of birth: 17 July 1992 (age 34)
- Place of birth: Oława, Poland
- Height: 1.91 m (6 ft 3 in)
- Position: Goalkeeper

Team information
- Current team: Podbeskidzie
- Number: 1

Youth career
- 2006–2008: MKS Oława

Senior career*
Years	Team	Apps	(Gls)
2008–2009	MKS Oława	9	(0)
2009–2021	Zagłębie Lubin	83	(0)
2012–2013	→ Kolejarz Stróże (loan)	13	(0)
2013	→ Flota Świnoujście (loan)	3	(0)
2014	→ Calisia Kalisz (loan)	15	(0)
2021–2024	Korona Kielce	60	(0)
2024–	Podbeskidzie	56	(0)

International career
2009–2010	Poland U19	5	(0)
- * Club domestic league appearances and goals as of 14:44, 6 June 2026 (UTC)

Konrad Forenc (born 17 July 1992) is a Polish professional footballer who plays as a goalkeeper for and captains I liga club Podbeskidzie Bielsko-Biała.

== Honours ==
Zagłębie Lubin

- I liga: 2014–15

Zagłębie Lubin II

- IV liga Lower Silesia West: 2016–17

Korona Kielce II

- IV liga Świętokrzyskie: 2023–24
