= Podbeskidzie Bielsko-Biała =

Association football club in Poland

Podbeskidzie
- Full name: Towarzystwo Sportowe; Podbeskidzie Bielsko-Biała
- Nickname: Górale (The Gorals)
- Founded: 11 July 1997; 29 years ago
- Ground: Bielsko-Biała Stadium
- Capacity: 15,316
- Chairman: Krzysztof Sałajczyk
- Manager: Marcin Włodarski
- League: I liga
- 2025–26: II liga, 4th of 18 (promoted via play-offs)
- Website: www.tspodbeskidzie.pl
Home colours	Away colours

TS Podbeskidzie Bielsko-Biała (Polish pronunciation: [pɔdbɛˈskʲid͡ʑɛ ˈbjɛlskɔ ˈbjawa]) is a football club based in Bielsko-Biała, Poland. They currently compete in the I liga, after winning the II liga promotion play-offs in the 2025–26 season.

== History ==
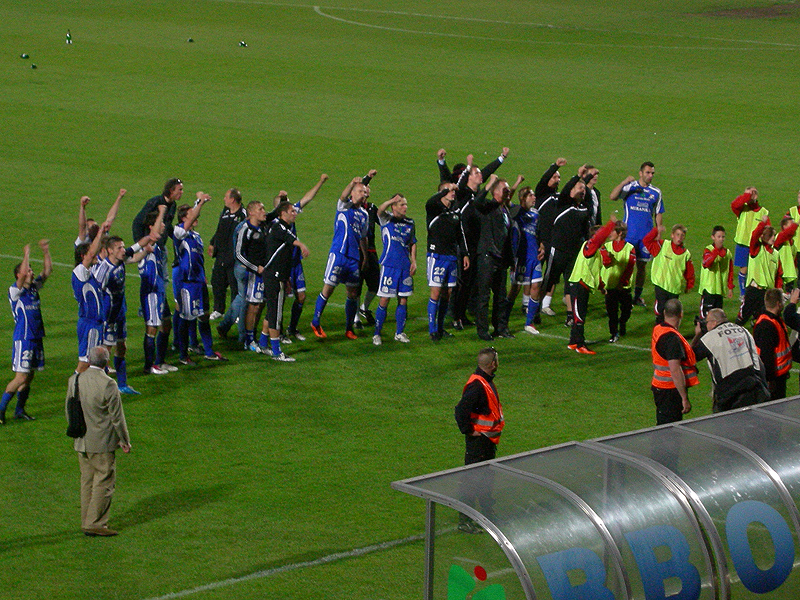
Podbeskidzie players celebrate winning promotion to the Ekstraklasa in 2011

The club was essentially founded on 11 July 1997, although it can trace its roots back to 1907. That year Bielitzer Fussball Klub (FK Bielitz) was established, in the town of Bielitz, Austria-Hungary, then dominated by ethnic Germans and so was the club. In 1911, the club was renamed to Bielitz-Bialaer Sport Verein (BBSV). Since 1920, the town, known henceforth as Bielsko, belonged to Poland, after the country regained independence. In 1936, the club changed its German name to Polish Bielsko-Bialskie Towarzystwo Sportowe Bielsko (BBTS Bielsko). In 1968, it was merged with KS Włókniarz (founded in 1911). The third ancestor, DKS Komorowice, was founded in 1995. Said clubs were merged altogether in 1997 to form TS Podbeskidzie Bielsko-Biała. From 2011 to 2016, the club performed in the top Polish football league, the Ekstraklasa, becoming the first club from Bielsko-Biała in the top-tier.

They competed in the Ekstraklasa again following their 2019–20 promotion. After the season, they were relegated back to the second-tier I liga. Despite the club's ambitions to quickly bounce back, they finished the 2023–24 I liga season second-last. This marked the end of their twenty-two-year run of competing across the top two divisions of Polish football, and a return to the third-tier for the first time since the 2001–02 season.

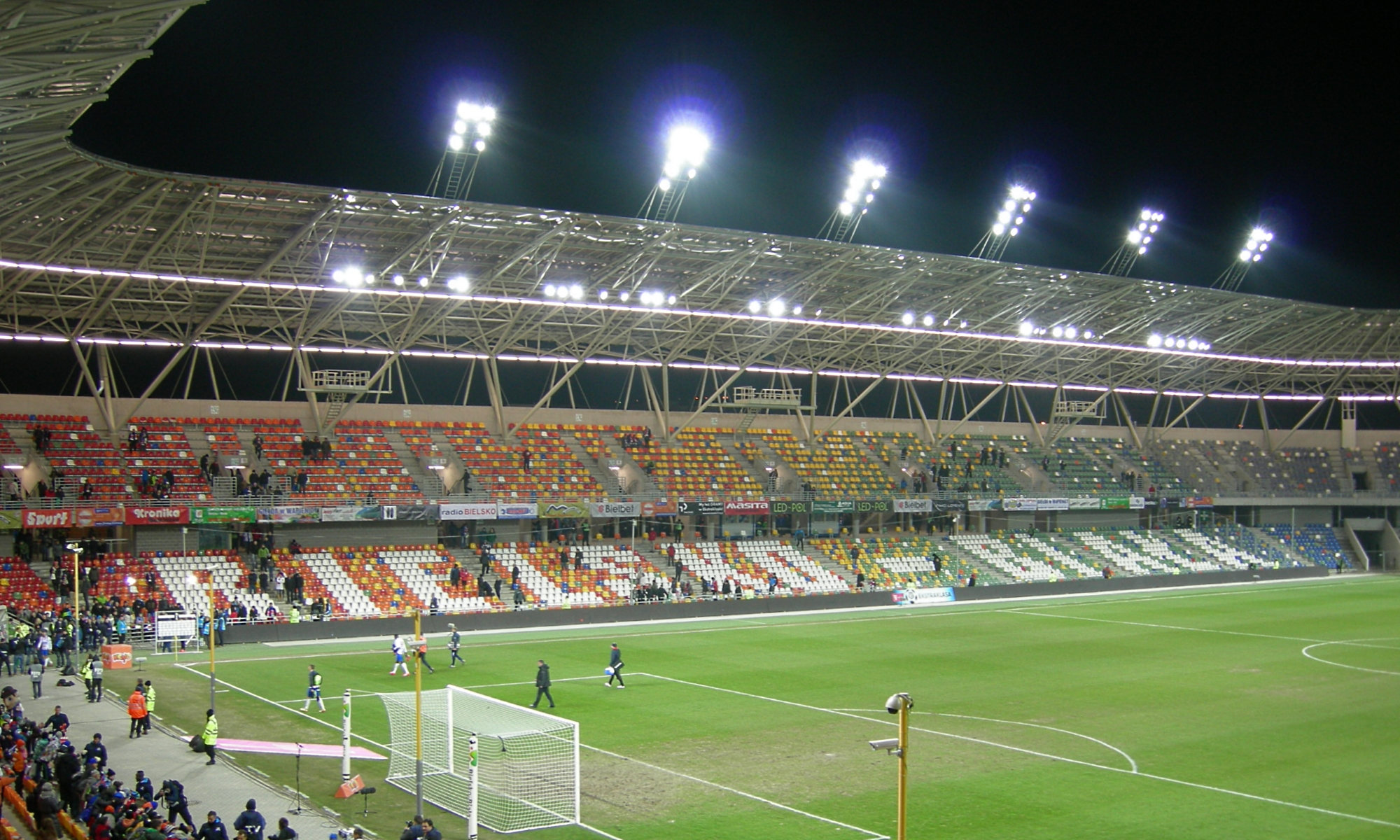
Ground: Stadion Miejski

== Honours ==
- I liga
  - Runners-up: 2010–11, 2019–20

== Players ==
=== Current squad ===
As of 15 September 2026

Note: Flags indicate national team as defined under FIFA eligibility rules; some limited exceptions apply. Players may hold more than one non-FIFA nationality.

No.	Pos.	Nation	Player
1	GK	POL	Konrad Forenc (captain)
2	DF	POL	Kamil Sochań (on loan from Zagłębie Lubin)
3	DF	POL	Arkadiusz Kasperkiewicz
4	DF	POL	Marcin Biernat
6	MF	POL	Michał Rakoczy (on loan from Górnik Zabrze)
7	MF	POL	Maksymilian Sitek
8	MF	SVK	Dalibor Takáč
9	FW	BLR	Yevgeny Shikavka
10	MF	POL	Daniel Pietraszkiewicz
11	MF	JPN	Toki Hirosawa
14	MF	POL	Marcin Urynowicz
16	MF	POL	Kacper Smoliński
17	DF	POL	Jan Majsterek
21	MF	POL	Krzysztof Kolanko
22	DF	POL	Kacper Gach

No.	Pos.	Nation	Player
24	FW	POL	Krzysztof Twardosz
26	MF	POL	Oskar Sewerzyński
27	MF	POL	Aleksander Iwańczyk
37	FW	POL	Oskar Tomczyk
44	GK	POL	Filip Majdak
47	DF	POL	Piotr Twardosz
55	GK	POL	Tomasz Lach
66	MF	POL	Filip Małkowski
71	MF	POL	Krzysztof Wiesner
79	MF	POL	Kamil Pazik
84	FW	POL	Bartosz Martosz
90	FW	POL	Lucjan Klisiewicz
91	GK	POL	Michał Matys (on loan from Zagłębie Lubin)
98	MF	POL	Wojciech Słomka
99	GK	POL	Szymon Brańczyk

=== Out on loan ===
Note: Flags indicate national team as defined under FIFA eligibility rules; some limited exceptions apply. Players may hold more than one non-FIFA nationality.

No.	Pos.	Nation	Player
—	MF	POL	Oskar Zawada (at Hutnik Kraków until 30 June 2027)
—	DF	POL	Łukasz Kabaj (at MKS Kluczbork until 30 June 2027)

== Coaching staff ==
As of 2 February 2026

Role	Name
Manager	(Poland) Marcin Włodarski
Assistant coaches	(Poland) Maciej Małkowski (Poland) Kornel Osyra (Poland) Dawid Plizga
Goalkeeping coach	(Poland) Paweł Rompa
Fitness coach	(Poland) Mateusz Surowiec
Physiotherapists	(Poland) Jan Cywiński (Poland) Sebastian Łaciak
Team doctor	(Poland) Sebastian Dominiak
Team manager	(Poland) Piotr Czak

== Managers ==
- (Poland) Zdzisław Byrdy (1997)
- (Poland) Bogdan Warzecha (1997)
- (Czech Republic) Zdeněk Dembinný (1997–98)
- (Poland) Wojciech Borecki (1 January 1999 – 16 June 2001)
- (Poland) Albin Wira (1 July 2001 – 31 December 2001)
- (Poland) Wojciech Borecki (29 August 2001 – 31 December 2002)
- (Poland) Paweł Kowalski (2003)
- (Poland) Wojciech Borecki (11 June 2003 – 15 October 2003)
- (Poland) Krzysztof Pawlak (15 October 2003 – 1 July 2004)
- (Poland) Jan Żurek (1 July 2004 – 23 August 2005)
- (Poland) Włodzimierz Małowiejski (23 August 2005 – 24 April 2006)
- (Poland) Krzysztof Tochel (2006–07)
- (Poland) Marcin Brosz (1 July 2007 – 2 November 2009)
- (Poland) Tomasz Świderski (2 November 2009 – 3 December 2009)
- (Poland) Robert Kasperczyk (4 December 2009 – 22 October 2012)
- (Poland) Andrzej Wyroba (caretaker) (22 October 2012 – 29 October 2012)
- (Poland) Marcin Sasal (29 October 2012 – 3 January 2013)
- (Poland) Dariusz Kubicki (4 January 2013 – 20 March 2013)
- (Poland) Czesław Michniewicz (22 March 2013 – 22 October 2013)
- (Poland) Leszek Ojrzyński (23 October 2013– 30 April 2015)
- (Poland) Dariusz Kubicki (4 May 2015 – 19 September 2015)
- (Poland) Robert Podoliński (20 September 2015 – 19 May 2016)
- (Poland) Dariusz Dźwigała (7 June 2016 – 11 October 2016)
- (Slovakia) Ján Kocian (11 October 2016 - 7 October 2017)
- (Poland) Adam Nocoń (7 October 2017 – 13 June 2018)
- (Poland) Krzysztof Brede (18 June 2018 – 15 December 2020)
- (Poland) Robert Kasperczyk (22 December 2020 – 25 May 2021)
- (Poland) Piotr Jawny (14 June 2021 – 26 April 2022)
- (Poland) Mirosław Smyła (26 April 2022 – 31 August 2022)
- (Poland) Dariusz Kołodziej (caretaker) (31 August 2022 – 6 September 2022)
- (Poland) Dariusz Żuraw (6 September 2022 – 3 June 2023)
- (Poland) Grzegorz Mokry (15 June 2023 – 15 November 2023)
- (Poland) Dariusz Marzec (16 November 2023 – 28 February 2024)
- (Poland) Jarosław Skrobacz (1 March 2024 – 17 June 2024)
- (Poland) Krzysztof Brede (17 June 2024 – 5 October 2025)
- (Poland) Tomasz Pawliczak (caretaker) (6 October 2025 – 5 November 2025)
- (Poland) Marcin Włodarski (5 November 2025 – present)

== See also ==
- Football in Poland
- List of football teams
