= 2017–18 Wisła Kraków season =

Wisła Kraków
2017–18 season
- Chairman: Marzena Sarapata
- Manager(s): Joan Carrillo (from 1 January 2018); Radosław Sobolewski and Kazimierz Kmiecik (from 11 December 2017 until 1 January 2018); Kiko Ramírez (until 10 December 2017)
- Ekstraklasa: 6th
- Polish Cup: Round of 16
- Top goalscorer: League: Carlitos (24 goals); All: Carlitos (24 goals)
- Highest home attendance: 33,000 (22 October vs Legia Warsaw, Ekstraklasa)
- Lowest home attendance: 4,022 (28 February vs Korona Kielce, Ekstraklasa)
- Average home league attendance: 14,074
Home colours	Away colours	Third colours

2017–18 Wisła Kraków season was the 78th season in the Ekstraklasa and the 64th season in the Polish Cup. The season was from 15 June 2017 to 14 June 2018.

On 1 January 2018 Wisła hired new manager Joan Carrillo. The season was the last for club legends Arkadiusz Głowacki and Paweł Brożek. The farewell of both players took place on 13 May 2018 during the match with Lech Poznań.

== Sponsors ==
Main Sponsor

(Poland) LV Bet

Kit manufacturer

(Germany) Adidas

Last updated: 1 July 2017.
Source: Wisła Kraków

== Transfers ==
=== Summer transfer window ===
==== Arrivals ====
- The following players moved to Wisła.

	Name	Position	Transfer type	Previous club	Fee	Ref.
	Transfer					
Substituted on	(Croatia) Zoran Arsenić	Defender	1 July 2017	(Croatia) NK Osijek	Free	
Substituted on	(Spain) Julián Cuesta	Goalkeeper	1 July 2017	(Spain) UD Almería	Free	
Substituted on	(Spain) Carlitos	Forward	1 July 2017	(Spain) Villarreal CF B	Free	
Substituted on	(Croatia) Tibor Halilović	Midfielder	1 July 2017	(Croatia) NK Lokomotiva	Free	
Substituted on	(Spain) Fran Vélez	Defender	1 July 2017	(Spain) UD Almería	Free	
Substituted on	(Poland) Kamil Wojtkowski	Midfielder	3 July 2017	(Germany) RB Leipzig	Free	
Substituted on	(Slovakia) Martin Košťál	Midfielder	10 July 2017	(Slovakia) FC Spartak Trnava	Free	
Substituted on	(Albania) Vullnet Basha	Midfielder	10 August 2017	(Spain) UCAM Murcia	Free	
Substituted on	(Spain) Jesús Imaz	Forward	31 August 2017	(Spain) Cádiz CF	Free	
Substituted on	(Croatia) Marko Kolar	Forward	6 September 2017	(Croatia) NK Lokomotiva	Free	
Substituted on	(Spain) Víctor Pérez	Midfielder	9 September 2017	(Spain) AD Alcorcón	Free	
Substituted on	(Ukraine) Denys Balanyuk	Forward	9 September 2017	(Ukraine) FC Dnipro	Free	
Substituted on	(Poland) Marcin Wasilewski	Defender	18 November 2017	(England) Leicester City FC	Free	
	In on loan					
Substituted on	(Portugal) Zé Manuel	Midfielder	9 August 2017	(Portugal) Vitória de Setúbal	Free	

==== Departures ====
- The following players moved from Wisła.

	Name	Position	Transfer type	New club	Fee	Ref.
	Transfer					
Substituted off	(Poland) Łukasz Załuska	Goalkeeper	1 July 2017	(Poland) Pogoń Szczecin	Free	
Substituted off	(Poland) Mateusz Zachara	Forward	1 July 2017	(Portugal) CD Tondela	Free	
Substituted off	(Poland) Krzysztof Mączyński	Midfielder	6 July 2017	(Poland) Legia Warsaw	€500,000	
Substituted off	(France) Hugo Vidémont	Midfielder	11 August 2017	(Belgium) AFC Tubize	Free	
Substituted off	(Poland) Michał Miśkiewicz	Goalkeeper	17 August 2017	(Portugal) CD Feirense	Free	
Substituted off	(Croatia) Petar Brlek	Midfielder	25 August 2017	(Italy) Genoa CFC	€2,200,000	
Substituted off	(Poland) Alan Uryga	Defender	4 September 2017	(Poland) Wisła Płock	Free	
Substituted off	(Bosnia and Herzegovina) Semir Štilić	Midfielder	4 September 2017	(Poland) Wisła Płock	Free	
	On loan					
Substituted off	(Poland) Krzysztof Drzazga	Forward	3 July 2017	(Poland) Chojniczanka Chojnice	Free	
Substituted off	(Poland) Piotr Żemło	Defender	11 July 2017	(Poland) Wisła Puławy	Free	
Substituted off	(Poland) Wojciech Słomka	Midfielder	11 July 2017	(Poland) GKS Katowice	Free	
	Out on loan					
Substituted off	(Colombia) Cristian Echavarría	Midfielder	30 June 2017	(Finland) Seinäjoen Jalkapallokerho	Free	
Substituted off	(Colombia) Ever Valencia	Midfielder	30 June 2017	(Colombia) Independiente Medellín	Free	

=== Winter transfer window ===
==== Arrivals ====
- The following players moved to Wisła.

	Name	Position	Transfer type	Previous club	Fee	Ref.
	Transfer					
Substituted on	(Serbia) Nikola Mitrović	Midfielder	8 January 2018	(Serbia) FK Napredak Kruševac	Free	
Substituted on	(Slovenia) Matej Palčič	Defender	23 January 2018	(Slovenia) NK Maribor	Free	
	In on loan					
Substituted on	(Croatia) Petar Brlek	Midfielder	27 February 2018	(Italy) Genoa CFC	Free	

==== Departures ====
- The following players moved from Wisła.

	Name	Position	Transfer type	New club	Fee	Ref.
	Transfer					
Substituted off	(Spain) Víctor Pérez	Midfielder	2 March 2018	(India) Bengaluru FC	Free	
	Out on loan					
Substituted off	(Poland) Rafał Pietrzak	Defender	8 January 2018	(Poland) Zagłębie Lubin	Free	
Substituted off	(Poland) Krzysztof Drzazga	Forward	23 January 2018	(Poland) Puszcza Niepołomice	Free	
Substituted off	(Poland) Jakub Bartosz	Forward	26 January 2018	(Poland) Sandecja Nowy Sącz	Free	
	End of the loan					
Substituted off	(Portugal) Zé Manuel	Forward	31 January 2018	(Portugal) CD Feirense	Free	
	End of career					
Substituted off	(Poland) Arkadiusz Głowacki	Defender	13 May 2018	-	-	

== Coaching staff ==
Coach	(Spain) Joan Carrillo (from 1 January 2018)
Coach	(Poland) Radosław Sobolewski & Kazimierz Kmiecik (from 11 December 2017 until 31 December 2017)
Coach	(Spain) Kiko Ramírez (until 10 December 2017)
Second Coach	(Poland) Radosław Sobolewski
Assistant coach	(Poland) Kazimierz Kmiecik
Assistant coach	(Portugal) Gonçalo Feio (until 26 January 2018)
Goalkeeping coach	(Poland) Artur Łaciak
Fitness coach	(Spain) Jordi Jódar
Physical Preparation Coach	(Spain) Xavier Coll Planas (from 5 January 2018)
Motor Fitness Trainer	(Poland) Daniel Michalczyk
Doctor	(Poland) Mariusz Urban (from 15 November 2017)
Doctor	(Poland) Jacek Jurka (until 15 November 2017)
Masseur	(Poland) Zbigniew Woźniak
Physiotherapist	(Poland) Marcin Bisztyga
Team manager	(Poland) Jarosław Krzoska
Analyst	(Poland) Mariusz Kondak
Analyst	(Hungary) Mátyás Czuczi (from 5 January 2018)

Last updated: 15 November 2017.
Source: Wisła Kraków

== Competitions ==
=== Preseason and friendlies ===
24 June 2017	Olimpia Wojnicz (Poland)	1–10	(Poland) Wisła Kraków	Wojnicz, Poland
11:00 CEST (UTC+2)	Kamiński 77' (pen.)	Report	Cywka 6'; Głowacki 17'; Boguski 30'; Ondrášek 37' (pen.), 42', 44'; Arsenić 40'; Carlitos 68', 74' (pen.); Strojny 72' (o.g.)	Stadium: Stadion Olimpii; Attendance: 500; Referee: Tomasz Pilarski (Tarnów)

28 June 2017	Wisła Kraków (Poland)	1–2	(Poland) Raków Częstochowa	Myślenice, Poland
17:00 CEST (UTC+2)	Boguski 57'; Štilić (penalty missed) 72'	Report	Mizgała 21'; Czerkas 27'	Stadium: Sport Myślenice; Referee: Paweł Kukla (Kraków)

1 July 2017	Wisła Kraków (Poland)	2–0	(Poland) Odra Opole	Myślenice, Poland
11:00 CEST (UTC+2)	Arsenić 14'; Košťál (yellow card) 69'; Ondrášek 82'	Report		Stadium: Sport Myślenice

4 July 2017	Wisła Kraków (Poland)	1–0	(Poland) Puszcza Niepołomice	Kalwaria Zebrzydowska, Poland
17:30 CEST (UTC+2)	Ondrášek 79'	Report		Stadium: Ośrodek Sportu Kalwarianka; Referee: Michał Bobrek (Wadowice)

7 July 2017	Zagłębie Sosnowiec (Poland)	4–1	(Poland) Wisła Kraków	Sosnowiec, Poland
18:00 CEST (UTC+2)	Nawotka 21', (yellow card) 73'; Christovão 51', 60'; Mikita 57'; Milewski (yellow card) 75'	Report	Vélez (yellow card) 19'; Carlitos 49'; Wojtkowski (yellow card) 67'; Małecki (yellow card) 73'	Stadium: Stadion Ludowy; Referee: Sławomir Smaczny (Bytom)

31 August 2017	Skawinka Skawina (Poland)	0–10	(Poland) Wisła Kraków	Skawina, Poland
17:00 CEST (UTC+2)		Report	Chrisantus 5', 23', 39'; Boguski 20'; Halilović 40', 56'; Pietrzak 45' (pen.); Zé Manuel 62'; Carlitos 71'; Plewka 87'	Stadium: Stadion Miejski; Referee: Sebastian Krasny (Kraków)

13 September 2017	Bruk-Bet Termalica Nieciecza (Poland)	1–0	(Poland) Wisła Kraków	Nieciecza, Poland
11:00 CEST (UTC+2)	Mišák 34'	Report		Stadium: Boczne boisko Termaliki

7 October 2017	Wisła Kraków (Poland)	1–0	(Poland) Bruk-Bet Termalica Nieciecza	Myślenice, Poland
11:00 CEST (UTC+2)	Boguski 31'	Report	Kogut (yellow card)	Stadium: Sport Myślenice; Referee: Sebastian Krasny (Kraków)

11 November 2017	Wisła Kraków (Poland)	0–1	(Poland) Śląsk Wrocław	Sosnowiec, Poland
12:00 CET (UTC+1)		Report	Pich 45'	Stadium: Stadion Ludowy; Referee: Daniel Kruczyński (Żywiec)

21 November 2017	Wisła Kraków (Poland)	2–3	(Poland) Puszcza Niepołomice	Myślenice, Poland
13:00 CET (UTC+1)	Halilović 28'; Wojtkowski 43'	Report	Christovão 16'; Górski 75'; Zarzecki 90'	Stadium: Sport Myślenice; Referee: Mateusz Czerwień (Kraków)

17 January 2018	Villarreal CF B (Spain)	2–1	(Poland) Wisła Kraków	Castellón de la Plana, Spain
11:10 CET (UTC+1)	Moreno 22'; Dalmau 82'	Report	Carlitos 9'	Stadium: Ciudad Deportiva Facsa

23 January 2018	Videoton FC (Hungary)	0–1	(Poland) Wisła Kraków	Benidorm, Spain
16:30 CET (UTC+1)		Report	Mitrović 45'	Stadium: Meliá Villaitana

27 January 2018	Shanghai Shenxin FC (China)	0–0	(Poland) Wisła Kraków	Benidorm, Spain
15:30 CET (UTC+1)		Report		Stadium: Estadio Municipal Guillermo Amor

3 February 2018	Wisła Kraków (Poland)	2–0	(Poland) Bruk-Bet Termalica Nieciecza	Myślenice, Poland
11:45 CET (UTC+1)	Carlitos 9'; Boguski 13'	Report		Stadium: Sport Myślenice; Referee: Paweł Kukla (Kraków)

24 March 2018	Wisła Kraków (Poland)	2–0	(Poland) Piast Gliwice	Kraków, Poland
13:00 CET (UTC+1)	Małecki 53'; Ondrášek 62'	Report		Stadium: Stadion Miejski; Referee: Michał Gurgul (Kraków)

=== Ekstraklasa ===
==== Results summary ====
===== Regular season =====
Overall								Home						Away					
Pld	W	D	L	GF	GA	GD	Pts	W	D	L	GF	GA	GD	W	D	L	GF	GA	GD
30	12	8	10	41	36	+5	44	7	3	5	21	16	+5	5	5	5	20	20	0

Last updated: 7 April 2018.
Source: 90minut

===== Championship round =====
Overall								Home						Away					
Pld	W	D	L	GF	GA	GD	Pts	W	D	L	GF	GA	GD	W	D	L	GF	GA	GD
7	3	2	2	10	6	+4	11	1	1	1	4	2	+2	2	1	1	6	4	+2

Last updated: 20 May 2018.
Source: 90minut

==== Results by round ====
===== Regular season =====
Round	1	2	3	4	5	6	7	8	9	10	11	12	13	14	15	16	17	18	19	20	21	22	23	24	25	26	27	28	29	30
Ground	A	H	A	A	H	A	H	A	H	A	H	A	H	A	H	H	A	H	H	A	H	A	H	A	H	A	H	A	H	A
Result	W	W	L	W	W	L	D	L	W	L	D	W	L	D	W	W	D	L	L	W	L	D	W	D	D	L	W	W	L	D
Position	4	1	4	2	1	3	5	6	5	7	6	5	6	7	6	3	5	6	8	6	8	9	7	6	6	8	7	6	7	7

Updated to match(es) played on 7 April 2018. Source: 90minut
A = Away; H = Home; W = Win; D = Draw; L = Loss

===== Championship Round =====
Round	1	2	3	4	5	6	7
Ground	A	H	A	A	H	H	A
Result	D	L	W	W	W	D	L
Position	8	8	8	6	6	6	6

Updated to match(es) played on 20 May 2018. Source: 90minut
A = Away; H = Home; W = Win; D = Draw; L = Loss

==== Regular season ====
14 July 2017 1	Pogoń Szczecin	1–2	Wisła Kraków	Szczecin
20:30 CEST (UTC+2)	Gyurcsó 33' (pen.); Listkowski (yellow card) 38'	Report	Carlitos 16'; Brlek 19'; González (yellow card) 31'; Vélez (yellow card) 34'	Stadium: Stadion Miejski; Attendance: 8,289; Referee: Paweł Raczkowski (Warsaw)

21 July 2017 2	Wisła Kraków	1–0	Bruk-Bet Termalica Nieciecza	Kraków
20:30 CEST (UTC+2)	Sadlok (yellow card) 40'; Małecki (yellow card) 42'; Brożek (yellow card) 52'; Głowacki (yellow card) 63'; Vélez (yellow card) 88'; Brlek 89'; Ondrášek (yellow card) 90+2'	Report	Putivtsev (yellow card) 55'; Kecskés (yellow card) 72'; Piątek (yellow card) 81'; Kupczak (yellow card) 90+2'	Stadium: Stadion Miejski; Attendance: 11,811; Referee: Jarosław Przybył (Kluczbork)

30 July 2017 3	Górnik Zabrze	3–2	Wisła Kraków	Zabrze
20:30 CEST (UTC+2)	Angulo 38', 54'; González 52' (o.g.)	Report	González (yellow card) 19'; Głowacki (yellow card) 31'; Boguski 48'; Brlek (yellow card) 61'; Vélez (yellow card) 73'; Bartosz 87'	Stadium: Arena Zabrze; Attendance: 22,708; Referee: Szymon Marciniak (Płock)

4 August 2017 4	Wisła Płock	0–1	Wisła Kraków	Płock
20:30 CEST (UTC+2)		Report	Boguski (yellow card) 20'; Głowacki (yellow card) 90+3'; Carlitos 90+5'	Stadium: Stadion im. Kazimierza Górskiego; Attendance: 5,001; Referee: Bartosz Frankowski (Toruń)

12 August 2017 5	Wisła Kraków	2–1	KS Cracovia	Kraków
20:30 CEST (UTC+2)	Carlitos 80', 89'; Zé Manuel (yellow card) 90+2'	Report	Piątek 26'; Čovilo (yellow card) 45'; Pestka (yellow card) 57' (yellow-red card) 75'	Stadium: Stadion Miejski; Attendance: 25,523; Referee: Daniel Stefański (Bydgoszcz)

21 August 2017 6	Zagłębie Lubin	3–0	Wisła Kraków	Lubin
18:00 CEST (UTC+2)	Jach 6'; Starzyński (yellow card) 32'; Świerczok 57'; Buksa 86'	Report	Llonch (yellow card) 64'	Stadium: Stadion Zagłębia Lubin; Attendance: 8,191; Referee: Krzysztof Jakubik (Siedlce)

26 August 2017 7	Wisła Kraków	1–1	Lechia Gdańsk	Kraków
20:30 CEST (UTC+2)	Carlitos 39'; Małecki (yellow card) 44'; Košťál (yellow card) 63'; Vélez (yellow card) 66'; Zé Manuel (yellow card) 76'	Report	Augustyn (yellow card) 35'; Łukasik (yellow card) 47'; M. Paixão (yellow card) 60'; Matras (yellow card) 69'; J. Oliveira 79'	Stadium: Stadion Miejski; Attendance: 9,131; Referee: Mariusz Złotek (Stalowa Wola)

8 September 2017 8	Arka Gdynia	3–1	Wisła Kraków	Gdynia
20:30 CEST (UTC+2)	Siemaszko 33', (yellow card) 49'; Kakoko 38'; Vinicius (yellow card) 49'; Piesio (yellow card) 64'; Jurado 81'; Nalepa (yellow card) 84'	Report	Małecki 5'; González (yellow card) 40'; Głowacki (yellow card) 89'	Stadium: Stadion GOSiR; Attendance: 7,718; Referee: Bartosz Frankowski (Toruń)

16 September 2017 9	Wisła Kraków	2–0	Piast Gliwice	Kraków
20:30 CEST (UTC+2)	Sadlok (yellow card) 64'; Carlitos 89' (pen.), 90+4'; Wojtkowski (yellow card) 90+2'	Report	Sedlar (yellow card) 25'; Papadopulos (yellow card) 36'; Dziczek (yellow card) 43'	Stadium: Stadion Miejski; Attendance: 10,822; Referee: Krzysztof Jakubik (Siedlce)

23 September 2017 10	Korona Kielce	2–1	Wisła Kraków	Kielce
20:30 CEST (UTC+2)	Górski 37'; Cvijanović 56'; Kovačević (yellow card) 79'	Report	Carlitos 31'; Cywka (yellow card) 69'; Arsenić (yellow card) 86'	Stadium: Kolporter Arena; Attendance: 7,651; Referee: Paweł Raczkowski (Warsaw)

30 September 2017 11	Wisła Kraków	0–0	Jagiellonia Białystok	Kraków
20:30 CEST (UTC+2)	Llonch (yellow card) 32'; Głowacki (yellow card) 42'	Report	Romanchuk (yellow card) 15'; Burliga (yellow card) 50'; Sekulski (yellow card) 60'; Runje (yellow card) 66'	Stadium: Stadion Miejski; Attendance: 11,056; Referee: Tomasz Kwiatkowski (Warsaw)

14 October 2017 12	Śląsk Wrocław	0–2	Wisła Kraków	Wrocław
20:30 CEST (UTC+2)	Chrapek (yellow card) 40'; Tarasovs (yellow card) 41'; Kosecki (yellow card) 57'; Celeban (yellow card) 69'; Riera (yellow card) 85'	Report	Głowacki (yellow card) 47'; Imaz 50'; Carlitos 70' (pen.)	Stadium: Stadion Miejski; Attendance: 21,503; Referee: Paweł Raczkowski (Warsaw)

22 October 2017 13	Wisła Kraków	0–1	Legia Warsaw	Kraków
18:00 CEST (UTC+2)	González (yellow card) 66'; Carlitos (yellow card) 70'; Llonch (yellow card) 74'	Report	Niezgoda 21'; Kucharczyk (yellow card) 53'; Astiz (yellow card) 58'; Guilherme (yellow card) 69'	Stadium: Stadion Miejski; Attendance: 33,000; Referee: Bartosz Frankowski (Toruń)

27 October 2017 14	Lech Poznań	1–1	Wisła Kraków	Poznań
20:30 CEST (UTC+2)	Gumny (yellow card) 79'; Jevtić 90+4'	Report	Carlitos 8'	Stadium: INEA Stadion; Attendance: 26,361; Referee: Daniel Stefański (Bydgoszcz)

4 November 2017 15	Wisła Kraków	3–0	Sandecja Nowy Sącz	Kraków
18:00 CET (UTC+1)	Imaz 13', (yellow card) 42'; Halilović (yellow card) 24'; Carlitos 63' (pen.); Wojtkowski (yellow card) 90+3'; Bartkowski (yellow card) 90+6'; Pérez 90+8' (pen.)	Report	Piter-Bučko (yellow card) 20'; Baran (yellow card) 63'	Stadium: Stadion Miejski; Attendance: 14,007; Referee: Krzysztof Jakubik (Siedlce)

17 November 2017 16	Wisła Kraków	1–0	Pogoń Szczecin	Kraków
20:30 CET (UTC+1)	Bartkowski 74', (yellow card) 90+6'	Report	Râpă (red card) 62'; Drygas (yellow card) 69'; Fojut (yellow card) 90+6'	Stadium: Stadion Miejski; Attendance: 11,398; Referee: Paweł Gil (Lublin)

27 November 2017 17	Bruk-Bet Termalica Nieciecza	3–3	Wisła Kraków	Nieciecza
18:00 CET (UTC+1)	Piątek 14' (pen.); Jovanović (yellow card) 49', (goal) 88'; Pawłowski 60'; Putivtsev (yellow card) 67'	Report	Imaz 10'; Pérez (yellow card) 14'; Wojtkowski 22'; Carlitos 66'	Stadium: Stadion Termaliki Bruk-Bet; Attendance: 4,510; Referee: Tomasz Kwiatkowski (Warsaw)

3 December 2017 18	Wisła Kraków	2–3	Górnik Zabrze	Kraków
18:00 CET (UTC+1)	Głowacki (yellow card) 18' (yellow-red card) 73'; Boguski 21'; Basha (yellow card) 24'; Arsenić (yellow card) 54'; Sadlok (yellow card) 54'; Carlitos 76'; Wasilewski (yellow card) 90+4'	Report	Matuszek (yellow card) 28'; Angulo 55' (pen.); Wolniewicz (yellow card) 60'; Kurzawa 63'; Żurkowski 71'; Ledecký (yellow card) 90+6'	Stadium: Stadion Miejski; Attendance: 16,808; Referee: Daniel Stefański (Bydgoszcz)

10 December 2017 19	Wisła Kraków	0–1	Wisła Płock	Kraków
15:30 CET (UTC+1)	Wasilewski (yellow card) 53'; Pérez (yellow card) 90' (yellow-red card) 90+1'	Report	Szymański (yellow card) 24', (goal) 42'	Stadium: Stadion Miejski; Attendance: 10,141; Referee: Bartosz Frankowski (Toruń)

13 December 2017 20	KS Cracovia	1–4	Wisła Kraków	Kraków
20:30 CET (UTC+1)	Fink (yellow card) 70'; Malarczyk (yellow card) 70'; Helik 89'	Report	Llonch (yellow card) 33'; Wasilewski 42'; Imaz 44', 46'; Carlitos 67'; Arsenić (yellow card) 76'; Pérez (yellow card) 89'	Stadium: Stadion Cracovii; Attendance: 14,000; Referee: Krzysztof Jakubik (Siedlce)

17 December 2017 21	Wisła Kraków	1–2	Zagłębie Lubin	Kraków
18:00 CET (UTC+1)	Carlitos 39'; Wojtkowski (yellow card) 84'	Report	Guldan 4'; Świerczok 45'	Stadium: Stadion Miejski; Attendance: 10,515; Referee: Tomasz Kwiatkowski (Warsaw)

10 February 2018 22	Lechia Gdańsk	1–1	Wisła Kraków	Gdańsk
20:30 CET (UTC+1)	Peszko 33'	Report	Carlitos 15'	Stadium: Stadion Energa; Attendance: 7,915; Referee: Daniel Stefański (Bydgoszcz)

17 February 2018 23	Wisła Kraków	3–2	Arka Gdynia	Kraków
20:30 CET (UTC+1)	Imaz 45'; Arsenić 51', 83'; Cywka (yellow card) 63'	Report	Kun 11', (yellow card) 89'; Marciniak (yellow card) 40'; Marcjanik 60'; Łukasiewicz (yellow card) 86'	Stadium: Stadion Miejski; Attendance: 10,027; Referee: Szymon Marciniak (Płock)

25 February 2018 24	Piast Gliwice	0–0	Wisła Kraków	Gliwice
15:30 CET (UTC+1)		Report	Wojtkowski (yellow card) 78'; Arsenić (red card) 90+1'	Stadium: Stadion Miejski; Attendance: 3,396; Referee: Zbigniew Dobrynin (Łódź)

28 February 2018 25	Wisła Kraków	1–1	Korona Kielce	Kraków
18:00 CET (UTC+1)	Llonch (yellow card) 17'; Boguski (yellow card) 25'; Carlitos (penalty missed) 37'; Imaz 37'; Sadlok (yellow card) 90'	Report	Kiełb 21'; Diaw (yellow card) 59' (yellow-red card) 75'; Możdżeń (yellow card) 87'	Stadium: Stadion Miejski; Attendance: 4,022; Referee: Piotr Lasyk (Bytom)

5 March 2018 26	Jagiellonia Białystok	2–0	Wisła Kraków	Białystok
18:00 CET (UTC+1)	Romanchuk (yellow card) 23'; Novikovas (yellow card) 30'; Frankowski 41'; Mitrović 77', (yellow card) 88'	Report	Carlitos (yellow card) 26'; Imaz (yellow card) 55'	Stadium: Stadion Miejski; Attendance: 7,414; Referee: Krzysztof Jakubik (Siedlce)

9 March 2018 27	Wisła Kraków	3–1	Śląsk Wrocław	Kraków
20:30 CET (UTC+1)	Carlitos 19' (pen.), 61', 78'; Sadlok (yellow card) 30'; Mitrović (yellow card) 46'; Halilović (yellow card) 86'	Report	Piech (yellow card) 18'; Augusto (yellow card) 31'; Tarasovs 37'	Stadium: Stadion Miejski; Attendance: 10,224; Referee: Daniel Stefański (Bydgoszcz)

18 March 2018 28	Legia Warsaw	0–2	Wisła Kraków	Warsaw
18:00 CET (UTC+1)	Mączyński (yellow card) 25'; Astiz (yellow card) 62'; Pasquato (yellow card) 84'	Report	Carlitos 26' (pen.); Vélez 30'; Llonch (yellow card) 67'; Brlek (yellow card) 83'; Mitrović (yellow card) 85'	Stadium: Stadion Wojska Polskiego; Attendance: 20,175; Referee: Bartosz Frankowski (Toruń)

2 April 2018 29	Wisła Kraków	1–3	Lech Poznań	Kraków
18:00 CEST (UTC+2)	Carlitos 30'; Mitrović (yellow card) 39'; Sadlok (yellow card) 54'; Arsenić (yellow card) 63'	Report	Vujadinović (yellow card) 29'; Trałka (yellow card) 37'; Gytkjær 44' (pen.), 53', 84'; Jevtić (yellow card) 82'	Stadium: Stadion Miejski; Attendance: 20,053; Referee: Jarosław Przybył (Kluczbork)

7 April 2018 30	Sandecja Nowy Sącz	0–0	Wisła Kraków	Nieciecza
18:00 CEST (UTC+2)	Krachunov (yellow card) 58'	Report	Palčič (yellow card) 54'; Bartkowski (yellow card) 69'; Llonch (yellow card) 90+8'	Stadium: Stadion Termaliki Bruk-Bet; Attendance: 1,684; Referee: Łukasz Szczech (Warsaw)

==== Championship Round ====
16 April 2018 31	Wisła Płock	2–2	Wisła Kraków	Płock
18:00 CEST (UTC+2)	Uryga 24', (yellow card) 42'; Cywka 46' (o.g.); Štilić (yellow card) 53'	Report	Bartkowski 12', (yellow card) 78'; Halilović 32'; Llonch (yellow card) 40'; Imaz (yellow card) 73'; Vélez (yellow card) 82'	Stadium: Stadion im. Kazimierza Górskiego; Attendance: 7,012; Referee: Artur Aluszyk (Szczecin)

22 April 2018 32	Wisła Kraków	0–1	Legia Warsaw	Kraków
18:00 CEST (UTC+2)	Arsenić (yellow card) 55'; Cywka (yellow card) 75'; Vélez (yellow card) 90'	Report	Pasquato 43'; Niezgoda (yellow card) 45+1' (yellow-red card) 62'; Antolić (yellow card) 52'; Rémy (yellow card) 81'	Stadium: Stadion Miejski; Attendance: 23,156; Referee: Mariusz Złotek (Stalowa Wola)

29 April 2018 33	Jagiellonia Białystok	0–1	Wisła Kraków	Białystok
18:00 CEST (UTC+2)	Bezjak (penalty missed) 61'; Romanczuk (yellow card) 75'; Runje (yellow card) 90'	Report	Arsenić (yellow card) 52', (goal) 83'; Wasilewski (yellow card) 59'; Mitrović (yellow card) 60'; Cuesta (yellow card) 90+3'	Stadium: Stadion Miejski; Attendance: 15,534; Referee: Daniel Stefański (Bydgoszcz)

6 May 2018 34	Korona Kielce	0–3	Wisła Kraków	Kielce
15:30 CEST (UTC+2)	Jukić (yellow card) 15'; Alomerović (yellow card) 36'; Kovačević (yellow card) 51'; Gardawski (yellow card) 90+3'	Report	Carlitos 5', 70'; Boguski (yellow card) 30'; Imaz 43'; Cuesta (yellow card) 81'; Halilović (yellow card) 90+3'	Stadium: Kolporter Arena; Attendance: 7,867; Referee: Łukasz Szczech (Warsaw)

9 May 2018 35	Wisła Kraków	3–0	Zagłębie Lubin	Kraków
20:30 CEST (UTC+2)	Carlitos 33', (yellow card) 61'; Arsenić (yellow card) 58'; Llonch (yellow card) 81'; Boguski 83', 90'	Report	Jagiełło (yellow card) 24'; Matuszczyk (yellow card) 29'; Tosik (yellow card) 35'	Stadium: Stadion Miejski; Attendance: 7,063; Referee: Dominik Sulikowski (Gdańsk)

13 May 2018 36	Wisła Kraków	1–1	Lech Poznań	Kraków
18:00 CEST (UTC+2)	Boguski (yellow card) 69'; Cuesta (yellow card) 90+7'; Brożek 90+10'	Report	Gumny (yellow card) 36'; Gytkjær 49'; Janicki (yellow card) 90+7'; Burić (yellow card) 90+8'; Dilaver (yellow card) 90+8'	Stadium: Stadion Miejski; Attendance: 20,823; Referee: Krzysztof Jakubik (Siedlce)

20 May 2018 37	Górnik Zabrze	2–0	Wisła Kraków	Zabrze
18:00 CEST (UTC+2)	Wieteska (yellow card) 25'; Matuszek 32', (yellow card) 80'; Bochniewicz (yellow card) 64'; Żurkowski (yellow card) 74'; Angulo 87'	Report	Basha (yellow card) 35'; Llonch (yellow card) 82'; Wojtkowski (yellow card) 88'; Brożek (yellow card) 89'	Stadium: Arena Zabrze; Attendance: 24,563; Referee: Jarosław Przybył (Kluczbork)

=== Polish Cup ===
8 August 2017 Round of 32	Wisła Kraków	2–1	Wisła Płock	Kraków
20:45 CEST (UTC+2)	Pietrzak (yellow card) 32'; Cywka (yellow card) 35'; Llonch (yellow card) 40'; González 56' (pen.), 86' (pen.), (yellow card) 58'; Brożek (yellow card) 90+4'	Report	Pîrvulescu (yellow card) 21'; Łasicki (yellow card) 42' (yellow-red card) 85'; Łukowski 49'; Michalak (yellow card) 63'; Furman (yellow card) 67'	Stadium: Stadion Miejski; Attendance: 7,827; Referee: Dominik Sulikowski (Gdańsk)

20 September 2017 Round of 16	Korona Kielce	1–0 (a.e.t.)	Wisła Kraków	Kielce
20:45 CEST (UTC+2)	Górski (yellow card) 21'; Żubrowski (yellow card) 21' (yellow-red card) 33'; Kiełb (yellow card) 36'; Rymaniak (yellow card) 67'; Diaw 92'; Możdżeń (yellow card) 97'	Report	Pérez (yellow card) 24'; Arsenić (yellow card) 101'; Sadlok (yellow card) 103'	Stadium: Kolporter Arena; Attendance: 5,072; Referee: Jarosław Przybył (Kluczbork)

== Squad and statistics ==
=== Appearances, goals and discipline ===
As of Match played 20 May 2018

No.	Pos.	Name	Nat.	Ekstraklasa		Polish Cup		Total		Discipline	
No.	Pos.	Name	Nat.	Apps	Goals	Apps	Goals	Apps	Goals	Yellow card	Red card
1	GK	Julián Cuesta	(Spain)	20	0	0	0	20	0	3	0
22	GK	Michał Buchalik	(Poland)	17+1	0	2	0	20	0	0	0
2	DF	Rafał Pietrzak	(Poland)	0	0	1	0	1	0	1	0
4	DF	Maciej Sadlok	(Poland)	28	0	1	0	29	0	7	0
5	DF	Jakub Bartkowski	(Poland)	16+1	2	0	0	17	2	4	0
6	DF	Arkadiusz Głowacki	(Poland)	16+1	0	0	0	17	0	8	1
15	DF	Zoran Arsenić	(Croatia)	30+1	3	2	0	33	3	8	1
17	DF	Jakub Bartosz	(Poland)	1+12	1	1	0	14	1	0	0
19	DF	Tomasz Cywka	(Poland)	27	0	2	0	29	0	4	0
27	DF	Marcin Wasilewski	(Poland)	15+2	1	0	0	17	1	3	0
29	DF	Matej Palčič	(Slovenia)	8	0	0	0	8	0	1	0
32	DF	Iván González	(Spain)	13	0	2	2	15	2	5	0
7	MF	Pol Llonch	(Spain)	24+1	0	1+1	0	27	0	11	0
8	MF	Tibor Halilović	(Croatia)	11+14	1	2	0	27	1	3	0
9	MF	Rafał Boguski	(Poland)	27+3	4	2	0	32	4	4	0
16	MF	Nikola Mitrović	(Serbia)	15	0	0	0	15	0	4	0
20	MF	Vullnet Basha	(Albania)	14+2	0	1	0	17	0	2	0
21	MF	Petar Brlek	(Croatia)	7+5	2	0+1	0	13	2	2	0
21	MF	Víctor Pérez	(Spain)	6+6	1	1	0	13	1	5	1
26	MF	Kamil Wojtkowski	(Poland)	6+16	1	2	0	24	1	5	0
44	MF	Fran Vélez	(Spain)	16+1	1	0	0	17	1	6	0
70	MF	Zé Manuel	(Portugal)	4+3	0	0	0	7	0	2	0
77	MF	Martin Košťál	(Slovakia)	1+3	0	0+1	0	5	0	1	0
88	MF	Patryk Małecki	(Poland)	12+9	1	0+1	0	22	1	2	0
10	FW	Carlitos	(Spain)	36	24	0	0	36	24	4	0
11	FW	Jesús Imaz	(Spain)	26+4	8	0+1	0	31	8	3	0
14	FW	Zdeněk Ondrášek	(Czech Republic)	3+4	0	0	0	7	0	1	0
23	FW	Paweł Brożek	(Poland)	6+11	1	1+1	0	19	1	3	0
24	FW	Marko Kolar	(Croatia)	1+4	0	0	0	5	0	0	0
71	FW	Denys Balanyuk	(Ukraine)	1+6	0	1	0	8	0	0	0

=== Goalscorers ===
As of Match played 20 May 2018

Rank	Pos.	No.	Player	Ekstraklasa	Polish Cup	Total
1	FW	10	(Spain) Carlitos	24	0	24
2	FW	11	(Spain) Jesús Imaz	8	0	8
3	MF	9	(Poland) Rafał Boguski	4	0	4
4	DF	15	(Croatia) Zoran Arsenić	3	0	3
5	DF	5	(Poland) Jakub Bartkowski	2	0	2
5	MF	21	(Croatia) Petar Brlek	2	0	2
5	DF	32	(Spain) Iván González	0	2	2
8	MF	8	(Croatia) Tibor Halilović	1	0	1
8	DF	17	(Poland) Jakub Bartosz	1	0	1
8	MF	21	(Spain) Víctor Pérez	1	0	1
8	FW	23	(Poland) Paweł Brożek	1	0	1
8	MF	26	(Poland) Kamil Wojtkowski	1	0	1
8	DF	27	(Poland) Marcin Wasilewski	1	0	1
8	MF	44	(Spain) Fran Vélez	1	0	1
8	MF	88	(Poland) Patryk Małecki	1	0	1
TOTALS				50	2	52

=== Disciplinary record ===
As of Match played 20 May 2018

No.	Pos.	Name	Ekstraklasa		Polish Cup		Total	
No.	Pos.	Name	Yellow card	Red card	Yellow card	Red card	Yellow card	Red card
1	GK	(Spain) Julián Cuesta	3	0	0	0	3	0
2	DF	(Poland) Rafał Pietrzak	0	0	1	0	1	0
4	DF	(Poland) Maciej Sadlok	6	0	1	0	7	0
5	DF	(Poland) Jakub Bartkowski	4	0	0	0	4	0
6	DF	(Poland) Arkadiusz Głowacki	8	1	0	0	8	1
7	MF	(Spain) Pol Llonch	10	0	1	0	11	0
8	MF	(Croatia) Tibor Halilović	3	0	0	0	3	0
9	MF	(Poland) Rafał Boguski	4	0	0	0	4	0
10	FW	(Spain) Carlitos	4	0	0	0	4	0
11	FW	(Spain) Jesús Imaz	3	0	0	0	3	0
14	FW	(Czech Republic) Zdeněk Ondrášek	1	0	0	0	1	0
15	DF	(Croatia) Zoran Arsenić	7	1	1	0	8	1
16	MF	(Serbia) Nikola Mitrović	4	0	0	0	4	0
19	DF	(Poland) Tomasz Cywka	3	0	1	0	4	0
20	MF	(Albania) Vullnet Basha	2	0	0	0	2	0
21	MF	(Croatia) Petar Brlek	2	0	0	0	2	0
21	MF	(Spain) Víctor Pérez	4	1	1	0	5	1
23	FW	(Poland) Paweł Brożek	2	0	1	0	3	0
26	MF	(Poland) Kamil Wojtkowski	5	0	0	0	5	0
27	DF	(Poland) Marcin Wasilewski	3	0	0	0	3	0
29	DF	(Slovenia) Matej Palčič	1	0	0	0	1	0
32	DF	(Spain) Iván González	4	0	1	0	5	0
44	MF	(Spain) Fran Vélez	6	0	0	0	6	0
70	MF	(Portugal) Zé Manuel	2	0	0	0	2	0
77	MF	(Slovakia) Martin Košťál	1	0	0	0	1	0
88	MF	(Poland) Patryk Małecki	2	0	0	0	2	0

Last updated: 20 May 2018.
Source: Soccerway
