= 2016–17 Wisła Kraków season =

Wisła Kraków
2016–17 season
- Chairman: Marzena Sarapata (From 26 August 2016); Piotr Dunin-Suligostowski (Until 26 August 2016)
- Manager: Kiko Ramírez (From 3 January 2017); Kazimierz Kmiecik (Until 3 January 2017); Dariusz Wdowczyk (Until 10 November 2016)
- Ekstraklasa: 6th
- Polish Cup: Quarterfinal
- Top goalscorer: League: Rafał Boguski (12 goals); All: Rafał Boguski (13 goals)
- Highest home attendance: 30,128 (31 March vs Lech Poznań, Ekstraklasa)
- Lowest home attendance: 8,483 (17 September vs Piast Gliwice, Ekstraklasa)
- Average home league attendance: 13,792
Home colours	Away colours	Third colours

The 2016–17 season was the 77th season of Wisła Kraków in the Ekstraklasa.

== Sponsors ==
Main Sponsor

(Poland) LV Bet

Kit manufacturer

(Germany) Adidas

== Transfers ==
=== Summer transfer window ===
==== Arrivals ====
- The following players moved to Wisła.

	Name	Position	Transfer type	Previous club	Fee
	Transfer				
Substituted in	(Poland) Adam Mójta	Defender	2 June 2016	(Poland) Podbeskidzie Bielsko-Biała	Free
Substituted in	(Poland) Mateusz Zachara	Forward	13 June 2016	(China) Henan Jianye F.C.	Free
Substituted in	(Poland) Łukasz Załuska	Goalkeeper	15 July 2016	(Germany) SV Darmstadt 98	Free

==== Departures ====
- The following players moved from Wisła.

	Name	Position	Transfer type	New club	Fee
	Transfer				
Substituted off	(Brazil) Rafael Crivellaro	Midfielder	18 June 2016	(Portugal) FC Arouca	Free
Substituted off	(Haiti) Wilde Donald Guerrier	Midfielder	20 July 2016	(Turkey) Alanyaspor	Free
Substituted off	(Haiti) Emmanuel Sarki	Midfielder	13 August 2016	(Cyprus) AEL Limassol	Free
Substituted off	(Ukraine) Vitaliy Balashov	Midfielder	29 June 2016	(Moldova) FC Milsami Orhei	Free
Substituted off	(Poland) Grzegorz Marszalik	Midfielder	12 August 2016	(Poland) Rozwój Katowice	Free
Substituted off	(Poland) Kamil Kuczak	Midfielder	12 August 2016	(Poland) Pelikan Łowicz	Free
Substituted off	(Poland) Michał Czekaj	Defender	12 August 2016	(Poland) Rozwój Katowice	Free
Substituted off	(Poland) Jakub Mordec	Midfielder	31 August 2016	(Poland) Karpaty Krosno	Free
	Out on loan				
Substituted off	(Poland) Rafał Wolski	Midfielder	4 July 2016	(Poland) Lechia Gdańsk	Free

=== Winter transfer window ===
==== Arrivals ====
	Name	Position	Transfer type	Previous club	Fee
	Transfer				
Substituted in	(Spain) Iván González	Defender	11 January 2017	(Spain) AD Alcorcón	Free
Substituted in	(Poland) Wojciech Słomka	Midfielder	12 January 2017	(Poland) Progres Kraków	Free
Substituted in	(Bosnia and Herzegovina) Semir Štilić	Midfielder	14 January 2017	(Cyprus) APOEL FC	Free
Substituted in	(Poland) Jakub Bartkowski	Defender	1 February 2017	(Poland) Wigry Suwałki	Free
Substituted in	(Spain) Pol Llonch	Midfielder	2 February 2017	(Spain) Granada CF B	Free
Substituted in	(France) Hugo Vidémont	Midfielder	7 February 2017	(France) AC Ajaccio	Free
Substituted in	(Croatia) Matija Špičić	Defender	7 February 2017	(Georgia (country)) Dinamo Tbilisi	Free
Substituted in	(Poland) Kacper Laskoś	Midfielder	8 February 2017	(Poland) Wisła II Kraków	Free
	In on loan				
Substituted in	(Colombia) Ever Valencia	Midfielder	16 February 2017	(Colombia) Independiente Medellín	Free
Substituted in	(Colombia) Cristian Echavarría	Midfielder	16 February 2017	(Mexico) Venados FC	Free

==== Departures ====
- The following players moved from Wisła.

	Name	Position	Transfer type	New club	Fee
	Transfer				
Substituted off	(Hungary) Richárd Guzmics	Defender	6 January 2017	(China) Yanbian Funde FC	€ 1.000.000
Substituted off	(Slovenia) Boban Jović	Defender	13 January 2017	(Turkey) Bursaspor	€ 300.000
Substituted off	(Poland) Adam Mójta	Defender	2 February 2017	(Poland) Piast Gliwice	Free
Substituted off	(Slovenia) Denis Popović	Midfielder	24 February 2017	(Russia) FC Orenburg	€ 200.000
	Out on loan				
Substituted off	(Poland) Krzysztof Drzazga	Forward	20 January 2017	(Poland) Stal Mielec	Free
Substituted off	(Poland) Piotr Żemło	Forward	8 February 2017	(Poland) Wisła Puławy	Free

== Competitions ==
=== Friendlies ===
25 June 2016	Kmita Zabierzów (Poland)	0–10	(Poland) Wisła Kraków	Zabierzów, Poland
11:00 CEST (UTC+2)		Report	Kujawa 11'; Ondrášek 20', 31'; Zachara 47', 59'; Boguski 58', 68'; Pietrzak 72', 84'; Popiela 88'	Stadium: Gminny Stadion Sportowy; Referee: Grzegorz Jabłoński (Kraków)

29 June 2016	Wisła Kraków (Poland)	3–1	(Poland) Zagłębie Sosnowiec	Myślenice, Poland
11:00 CEST (UTC+2)	Sadlok 11'; Brlek 73'; Drzazga 90'	Report	Zaradny 87'	Stadium: Sport Myślenice; Referee: Robert Marcinak (Kraków)

2 July 2016	Wisła Kraków (Poland)	1–1	(Poland) Ruch Chorzów	Myślenice, Poland
11:30 CEST (UTC+2)	Ondrášek 23' (pen.)	Report	Arak 11'	Stadium: Sport Myślenice; Referee: Grzegorz Jabłoński (Kraków)

6 July 2016	MFK Karviná (Czech Republic)	2–1	(Poland) Wisła Kraków	Karviná, Czech Republic
17:00 CEST (UTC+2)	Puchel 40'; Duda 87'	Report	Drzazga 47'	Stadium: Stadion Kovony; Referee: Jan Machálek (Czech Republic)

9 July 2016	Śląsk Wrocław (Poland)	3–3	(Poland) Wisła Kraków	Sosnowiec, Poland
11:00 CEST (UTC+2)	Dvali 25'; Mójta 41' (o.g.); Biliński 51' (pen.)	Report	Brożek 23', 80'; Boguski (penalty missed) 55'; Gonçalves 61' (o.g.)	Stadium: Stadion Ludowy

26 July 2016	Wisła Kraków (Poland)	3–3	(Israel) Hapoel Ra'anana	Gniewino, Poland
11:00 CEST (UTC+2)	Boguski 39'; Ondrášek 48'; Drzazga 74'	Report		Stadium: Stadion Gminny

2 August 2016	MKS Kalwarianka (Poland)	0–7	(Poland) Wisła Kraków	Kalwaria Zebrzydowska, Poland
17:00 CEST (UTC+2)		Report	Brożek 6'; Żemło 33'; Małecki 42'; Popović 66'; Drzaga 70'; Jović 77'; Boguski 83'	Stadium: Ośrodek Sportu Kalwarianka

7 October 2016	Bocheński KS (Poland)	0–3	(Poland) Wisła Kraków	Bochnia, Poland
15:30 CEST (UTC+2)		Report	Drzazga 2', 8'; Małecki 35'	Stadium: Miejski Stadion Sportowy im. dr. Władysława Krupy; Referee: Tomasz Kubik

19 January 2017	Wisła Kraków (Poland)	0–2	(Poland) Raków Częstochowa	Myślenice, Poland
12:00 CEST (UTC+1)		Report	Płonka 38'; Figiel 84'	Stadium: Sport Myślenice; Referee: Tomasz Musiał (Kraków)

25 January 2017	Paksi FC (Hungary)	2–1	(Poland) Wisła Kraków	Kumköy, Turkey
15:00 CET (UTC+1)	Jelena 78'; Hajdú 87'	Report	Mączyński 36'	Stadium: Limak Arcadia Golf and Sport Resort

28 January 2017	MŠK Žilina (Slovakia)	1–2	(Poland) Wisła Kraków	Kumköy, Turkey
16:00 CET (UTC+1)	Cywka 79' (o.g.)	Report	Boguski 28'; Bartosz 78'	Stadium: Limak Arcadia Golf and Sport Resort

31 January 2017	FC Steaua București (Romania)	3–4	(Poland) Wisła Kraków	Belek, Turkey
15:30 CET (UTC+1)	Tamaș 18'; Alibec 38', 53'	Report	Ondrášek 23'; Popović 72'; Brożek 89'; Małecki 90'	Stadium: Susesi Football Centre

4 February 2017	Wisła Kraków (Poland)	3–1	(Poland) Zagłębie Sosnowiec	Myślenice, Poland
12:00 CET (UTC+1)	Zachara 6', 65'; Brożek 38'	Report	Pribula 18'	Stadium: Sport Myślenice; Referee: Mateusz Czerwień (Myślenice)

24 March 2017	Wisła Kraków (Poland)	3–0	(Poland) Podhale Nowy Targ	Myślenice, Poland
16:00 CET (UTC+1)	Boguski 4'; Małecki 38'; Valencia 72'	Report		Stadium: Sport Myślenice

5 April 2017	Wisła Kraków (Poland)	2–0	(Poland) Puszcza Niepołomice	Myślenice, Poland
16:00 CET (UTC+1)	Valencia 4'; Štilić 30'	Report		Stadium: Sport Myślenice; Referee: Robert Marciniak (Kraków)

11 April 2017	Wisła Kraków (Poland)	0–1	(Poland) Puszcza Niepołomice	Myślenice, Poland
16:50 CET (UTC+1)		Report	Orłowski 40'	Stadium: Sport Myślenice

=== Wisła as Kraków Team ===
11 November 2016	Kraków (Poland)	0–4	(Ukraine) Lviv	Kraków, Poland
12:00 CET (UTC+1)		Report	Kujawa 4' (o.g.); Ksyonz 23', 72'; Chachua 59'	Stadium: Stadion Miejski; Referee: Sebastian Krasny (Kraków)
Note: Wisła Kraków unter the name Kraków, FC Karpaty Lviv unter the name Lviv

=== Ekstraklasa ===
==== Results summary ====
===== Regular season =====
Overall								Home						Away					
Pld	W	D	L	GF	GA	GD	Pts	W	D	L	GF	GA	GD	W	D	L	GF	GA	GD
30	13	5	12	45	46	−1	44	10	3	2	28	15	+13	3	2	10	17	31	−14

Last updated: 22 April 2017.
Source: 90minut

===== Championship round =====
Overall								Home						Away					
Pld	W	D	L	GF	GA	GD	Pts	W	D	L	GF	GA	GD	W	D	L	GF	GA	GD
7	1	1	5	9	11	−2	4	1	0	2	5	3	+2	0	1	3	4	8	−4

Last updated: 4 June 2017.
Source: 90minut

==== Results by round ====
===== Regular season =====
Round	1	2	3	4	5	6	7	8	9	10	11	12	13	14	15	16	17	18	19	20	21	22	23	24	25	26	27	28	29	30
Ground	H	A	A	A	H	A	H	A	H	H	A	A	H	A	H	A	H	H	H	A	H	A	H	A	A	H	H	A	H	A
Result	W	L	L	L	L	L	L	L	W	D	W	D	W	D	W	L	W	W	D	L	W	L	W	W	L	W	D	W	W	L
Position	4	9	11	13	16	16	16	16	16	16	16	16	15	13	10	13	10	8	8	10	8	9	7	7	7	6	6	5	5	5

Updated to match(es) played on 22 April 2017. Source: 90minut
A = Away; H = Home; W = Win; D = Draw; L = Loss

===== Championship Round =====
Round	1	2	3	4	5	6	7
Ground	A	H	A	A	H	A	H
Result	D	L	L	L	W	L	L
Position	5	5	5	6	6	6	6

Updated to match(es) played on 4 June 2017. Source: 90minut
A = Away; H = Home; W = Win; D = Draw; L = Loss

==== Regular season ====
16 July 2016 1	Wisła Kraków	2–1	Pogoń Szczecin	Kraków
18:00 (CEST) (UTC+2)	Brożek 3'; Pietrzak 82'	Report	Fojut (yellow card) 25', (goal) 32'; Zwoliński (yellow card) 67'; Czerwiński (yellow card) 81'	Stadium: Stadion Miejski; Attendance: 9,779; Referee: Paweł Gil (Lublin)

22 July 2016 2	Arka Gdynia	3–0	Wisła Kraków	Gdynia
20:30 (CEST) (UTC+2)	Kakoko 6'; Zjawiński 21'; Božok (yellow card) 52'; Vinicius 81' (pen.)	Report	Boguski (yellow card) 42'; Sadlok (yellow card) 77'	Stadium: Stadion GOSiR; Attendance: 10,203; Referee: Tomasz Kwiatkowski (Warsaw)

30 July 2016 3	Lechia Gdańsk	3–1	Wisła Kraków	Gdańsk
18:00 (CEST) (UTC+2)	F. Paixao (yellow card) 12', (goal) 30', 68'; Wawrzyniak (yellow card) 28'; Peszko (yellow card) 81'; M. Paixao 89', (yellow card) 90'	Report	Małecki (yellow card) 7'; Brlek (yellow card) 40'; Boguski 57'; Głowacki (yellow card) 87'	Stadium: Stadion Energa; Attendance: 15,960; Referee: Krzysztof Jakubik (Siedlce)

7 August 2016 4	Cracovia	2–1	Wisła Kraków	Kraków
20:30 (CEST) (UTC+2)	Budziński 2'; Polczak (yellow card) 35'; Szczepaniak 43'; Steblecki (yellow card) 90+4'	Report	Popović (yellow card) 49'; Sadlok (yellow card) 59'; Małecki (yellow card) 88', (goal) 89'	Stadium: Marshal Józef Piłsudski Stadium; Attendance: 14,000; Referee: Daniel Stefański (Bydgoszcz)

14 August 2016 5	Wisła Kraków	1–2	Ruch Chorzów	Kraków
18:00 (CEST) (UTC+2)	Zachara 5'; Sadlok (yellow card) 34'; Mójta (yellow card) 70'; Mączyński (yellow card) 76'	Report	Stępiński 25'; Oleksy 55'; Grodzicki (yellow card) 80'	Stadium: Stadion Miejski; Attendance: 12,703; Referee: Szymon Marciniak (Płock)

22 August 2016 6	Korona Kielce	1–0	Wisła Kraków	Kielce
18:00 (CEST) (UTC+2)	Dejmek (yellow card) 11'; Cebula (yellow card) 21'; Gabovs (yellow card) 80'; Grzelak (yellow card) 90'; Kiełb 90+3'	Report	Głowacki (yellow card) 23'; Ondrášek (yellow card) 85'	Stadium: Kolporter Arena; Attendance: 6,754; Referee: Bartosz Frankowski (Toruń)

26 August 2016 7	Wisła Kraków	1–5	Śląsk Wrocław	Kraków
20:30 (CEST) (UTC+2) (UTC+2)	Uryga (yellow card) 33'; Mójta 60' (pen.); Głowacki (yellow card) 71'; Guzmics (yellow card) 84'	Report	Biliński 45'; Kokoszka (yellow card) 62'; Morioka 69', 81'; Gonçalves 71'; Stjepanović 90+1' (pen.)	Stadium: Stadion Miejski; Attendance: 13,607; Referee: Tomasz Kwiatkowski (Warsaw)

11 September 2016 8	Jagiellonia Białystok	2–1	Wisła Kraków	Białystok
18:00 (CEST) (UTC+2)	Tomasik (yellow card) 6'; Khomchenovskyi 12', (yellow card) 37'; Vassiljev 73'	Report	Popović (yellow card) 38'; Sadlok (yellow card) 43'; Małecki (yellow card) 51', (goal) 85'; Jović (yellow card) 67'	Stadium: Stadion Miejski; Attendance: 18,646; Referee: Paweł Raczkowski (Warsaw)

17 September 2016 9	Wisła Kraków	1–0	Piast Gliwice	Kraków
20:30 (CEST) (UTC+2)	Mączyński (yellow card) 42'; Głowacki (yellow card) 55'; Guzmics (yellow card) 85'; Małecki 90'	Report	Hebert (yellow card) 63'; Masłowski (yellow card) 75'	Stadium: Stadion Miejski; Attendance: 8,483; Referee: Daniel Stefański (Bydgoszcz)

23 September 2016 10	Wisła Kraków	0–0	Legia Warsaw	Kraków
20:30 (CEST) (UTC+2)	Popović (yellow card) 17', (penalty missed) 83'; Mójta (yellow card) 84'; Jović (yellow card) 85'	Report	Pazdan (yellow card) 17'; Guilherme (yellow card) 60'; Czerwiński (yellow card) 75'; Broź (yellow card) 80'	Stadium: Stadion Miejski; Attendance: 19,477; Referee: Paweł Gil (Lublin)

1 October 2016 11	Wisła Płock	2–3	Wisła Kraków	Płock
18:00 (CEST) (UTC+2)	Furman 49' (pen.); Merebashvili 69'; Reca (yellow card) 80'	Report	Jović (yellow card) 3'; Zachara 12'; Mójta (yellow card) 29'; Guzmics 34', (yellow card) 64'; Małecki 90'	Stadium: Stadion im. Kazimierza Górskiego; Attendance: 7,558; Referee: Paweł Raczkowski (Warsaw)

16 October 2016 12	Lech Poznań	1–1	Wisła Kraków	Poznań
18:00 (CEST) (UTC+2)	Kędziora (yellow card) 9'; Jevtić 69'	Report	Mączyński (yellow card) 6'; Głowacki (yellow card) 64'; Ondrášek (yellow card) 79'; Brożek 90'	Stadium: INEA Stadion; Attendance: 20,158; Referee: Jarosław Przybył (Kluczbork)

21 October 2016 13	Wisła Kraków	2–0	Bruk-Bet Termalica Nieciecza	Kraków
20:30 (CEST) (UTC+2)	Ondrášek 26', 69' (pen.), (yellow card) 90'; Mączyński (yellow card) 46'; Sadlok (yellow card) 54'	Report	Osyra (yellow card) 68'	Stadium: Stadion Miejski; Attendance: 11,347; Referee: Paweł Raczkowski (Warsaw)

31 October 2016 14	Zagłębie Lubin	2–2	Wisła Kraków	Lubin
18:00 (CET) (UTC+1)	Janus (yellow card) 7'; Todorovski (yellow card) 29'; Woźniak 45+2', 49'	Report	Brlek 14'; Uryga (yellow card) 63'; Popović (yellow card) 67'; Bartosz 76'	Stadium: Stadion Zagłębia Lubin; Attendance: 6,281; Referee: Daniel Stefański (Bydgoszcz)

6 November 2016 15	Wisła Kraków	3–2	Górnik Łęczna	Kraków
15:30 (CET) (UTC+1)	Boguski 8', 33', 62'; Jović (yellow card) 67'; Brlek (yellow card) 77'	Report	Danielewicz 39'; Drewniak 59' (pen.), (yellow card) 72'; Piesio (yellow card) 79' (yellow-red card) 90'	Stadium: Stadion Miejski; Attendance: 10,362; Referee: Krzysztof Jakubik (Siedlce)

19 November 2016 16	Pogoń Szczecin	6–2	Wisła Kraków	Szczecin
18:00 (CET) (UTC+1)	Gyurcsó 15', 20', 25', 51'; Matras 34'; Nunes 48'; Fojut (yellow card) 74'	Report	Brlek (yellow card) 6'; Mączyński (yellow card) 35'; Bartosz 37'; Mójta 74'	Stadium: Stadion Miejski; Attendance: 6,935; Referee: Jarosław Przybył (Kluczbork)

26 November 2016 17	Wisła Kraków	5–1	Arka Gdynia	Kraków
20:30 (CET) (UTC+1)	Boguski 18', 29', 63'; Brlek 38'; Brożek 71'; Sadlok (yellow card) 72'	Report	Warcholak 5'; Sobieraj (yellow card) 49'	Stadium: Stadion Miejski; Attendance: 9,132; Referee: Jarosław Przybył (Kluczbork)

3 December 2016 18	Wisła Kraków	3–0	Lechia Gdańsk	Kraków
20:30 (CET) (UTC+1)	Głowacki 5'; Boguski 26'; Zachara 88'	Report	Peszko (yellow card) 45'; Kuświk (yellow card) 56'; M. Paixão (penalty missed) 64'	Stadium: Stadion Miejski; Attendance: 9,607; Referee: Bartosz Frankowski (Toruń)

10 December 2016 19	Wisła Kraków	1–1	KS Cracovia	Kraków
20:30 (CET) (UTC+1)	Brlek 3'; Sadlok (yellow card) 70'	Report	Steblecki (yellow card) 43'; Brzyski (yellow card) 55'; Piątek (yellow card) 70', (goal) 71'; Dąbrowski (yellow card) 77'	Stadium: Stadion Miejski; Attendance: 28,907; Referee: Tomasz Kwiatkowski (Warsaw)

16 December 2016 20	Ruch Chorzów	1–0	Wisła Kraków	Chorzów
20:30 (CET) (UTC+1)	Surma (yellow card) 63'; Niezgoda 80'; Lipski (yellow card) 86'; Kowalczyk (yellow card) 89'	Report	Guzmics (yellow card) 61'	Stadium: Stadion Ruchu; Attendance: 7,137; Referee: Paweł Gil (Lublin)

11 February 2017 21	Wisła Kraków	2–0	Korona Kielce	Kraków
18:00 (CET) (UTC+1)	Głowacki (yellow card) 6'; Małecki 12', (yellow card) 65'; Brożek (penalty missed) 79', 79'; Mączyński (yellow card) 80'	Report		Stadium: Stadion Miejski; Attendance: 10,511; Referee: Tomasz Kwiatkowski (Warsaw)

18 February 2017 22	Śląsk Wrocław	1–0	Wisła Kraków	Wrocław
18:00 (CET) (UTC+1)	Pich (yellow card) 52'; Joan Román 76'	Report	Małecki (yellow card) 50'; Głowacki (yellow card) 56'	Stadium: Stadion Miejski; Attendance: 9,667; Referee: Paweł Gil (Lublin)

25 February 2017 23	Wisła Kraków	3–1	Jagiellonia Białystok	Kraków
20:30 (CET) (UTC+1)	Brożek 21'; Małecki 35', (yellow card) 90+3'; González (yellow card) 44' (yellow-red card) 90'; Boguski 52'	Report	Runje (yellow card) 55'; Szymański 90+1'	Stadium: Stadion Miejski; Attendance: 11,210; Referee: Szymon Marciniak (Płock)

4 March 2017 24	Piast Gliwice	1–2	Wisła Kraków	Gliwice
20:30 (CET) (UTC+1)	Badía 81'	Report	Ondrášek 69'; Brlek 90'	Stadium: Stadion Miejski; Attendance: 5,447; Referee: Daniel Stefański (Bydgoszcz)

12 March 2017 25	Legia Warsaw	1–0	Wisła Kraków	Warsaw
18:00 (CET) (UTC+1)	Radović 11'; Jędrzejczyk (yellow card) 61'	Report	Małecki (yellow card) 25'	Stadium: Stadion Wojska Polskiego; Attendance: 26,870; Referee: Paweł Gil (Lublin)

17 March 2017 26	Wisła Kraków	3–2	Wisła Płock	Kraków
20:30 (CET) (UTC+1)	Brlek 24'; Llonch (yellow card) 40'; Mączyński (yellow card) 41'; Brożek (yellow card) 43'; Cywka (yellow card) 51'; González (yellow card) 52'; Štilić (yellow card) 77', (goal) 84'; Bartosz 86'	Report	Krivets 41'; Furman (yellow card) 43'; Reca (yellow card) 69'; Piątkowski 72'	Stadium: Stadion Miejski; Attendance: 12,123; Referee: Jarosław Przybył (Kluczbork)

31 March 2017 27	Wisła Kraków	0–0	Lech Poznań	Kraków
20:30 (CET) (UTC+1)		Report	Gajos (yellow card) 51'	Stadium: Stadion Miejski; Attendance: 30,128; Referee: Paweł Raczkowski (Warsaw)

8 April 2017 28	Bruk-Bet Termalica Nieciecza	2–3	Wisła Kraków	Nieciecza
20:30 (CEST) (UTC+2)	Mišák 14'; Putivtsev 51'; Mikovič (yellow card) 72'	Report	Putivtsev 12' (o.g.); Małecki (yellow card) 56'; Brlek 64', (yellow card) 76'; Llonch (yellow card) 76'; Zachara 90'	Stadium: Stadion Termaliki Bruk-Bet; Attendance: 4,595; Referee: Krzysztof Jakubik (Siedlce)

17 April 2017 29	Wisła Kraków	1–0	Zagłębie Lubin	Kraków
18:00 (CEST) (UTC+2)	González (yellow card) 60'; Małecki 63'; Sadlok (yellow card) 84'; Mączyński (yellow card) 88'	Report	Janoszka (yellow card) 58'	Stadium: Stadion Miejski; Attendance: 12,411; Referee: Szymon Marciniak (Płock)

22 April 2017 30	Górnik Łęczna	3–1	Wisła Kraków	Lublin
18:00 (CEST) (UTC+2)	Śpiączka 22', 90+3'; Bonin 79'	Report	Brlek (yellow card) 39'; Głowacki 72'	Stadium: Arena Lublin; Attendance: 5,903; Referee: Tomasz Kwiatkowski (Warsaw)

==== Championship Round ====
30 April 2017 31	Legia Warsaw	1–1	Wisła Kraków	Warsaw
18:00 (CEST) (UTC+2)	Moulin (yellow card) 49'; Jędrzejczyk 75'	Report	Brlek 58' (pen.)	Stadium: Stadion Wojska Polskiego; Attendance: 22,239; Referee: Daniel Stefański (Bydgoszcz)

6 May 2017 32	Wisła Kraków	0–1	Lechia Gdańsk	Kraków
20:30 (CEST) (UTC+2)	Cywka (yellow card) 47' (yellow-red card) 50'; Sadlok (yellow card) 80'; Głowacki (yellow card) 84'; Bartosz (yellow card) 85'	Report	Slavchev (yellow card) 55'; Haraslín 58'; Janicki (yellow card) 80'; Maloča (yellow card) 81'	Stadium: Stadion Miejski; Attendance: 16,021; Referee: Paweł Gil (Lublin)

13 May 2017 33	Jagiellonia Białystok	2–0	Wisła Kraków	Białystok
15:30 (CEST) (UTC+2)	Sheridan 27'; Góralski (yellow card) 28'; Khomchenovskyi 90'	Report	Štilić (yellow card) 53'	Stadium: Stadion Miejski; Attendance: 15,117; Referee: Jarosław Przybył (Kluczbork)

17 May 2017 34	Korona Kielce	3–2	Wisła Kraków	Kielce
18:30 (CEST) (UTC+2)	Dejmek 18'; Żubrowski (yellow card) 40'; Możdżeń 54'; Kiełb 58' (pen.); Górski (yellow card) 69'; Borjan (yellow card) 88'	Report	Brlek 6'; Mączyński 29', (yellow card) 31'; Głowacki (yellow card) 55'; González (yellow card) 57' (yellow-red card) 66'; Ondrášek (yellow card) 67'; Małecki (yellow card) 86'	Stadium: Kolporter Arena; Attendance: 9,911; Referee: Łukasz Bednarek (Koszalin)

20 May 2017 35	Wisła Kraków	4–0	Pogoń Szczecin	Kraków
20:30 (CEST) (UTC+2)	Małecki 18'; Brożek 24'; González 32'; Boguski 35'; Špičić (yellow card) 83'; Cywka (yellow card) 90+3'	Report	Râpă (yellow card) 40'; Matras (yellow card) 80'	Stadium: Stadion Miejski; Attendance: 11,588; Referee: Dominik Sulikowski (Gdańsk)

28 May 2017 36	Lech Poznań	2–1	Wisła Kraków	Poznań
18:00 (CEST) (UTC+2)	Majewski 9'; Makuszewski 21'; Kędziora (yellow card) 58'	Report	Boguski 27'; Špičić (yellow card) 34'; Bartkowski (yellow card) 43'; Głowacki (yellow card) 73'; González (yellow card) 90+1'	Stadium: INEA Stadion; Attendance: 19,373; Referee: Mariusz Złotek (Stalowa Wola)

4 June 2017 37	Wisła Kraków	1–2	Bruk-Bet Termalica Nieciecza	Kraków
18:00 (CEST) (UTC+2)	Boguski 14'; Štilić (yellow card) 16'	Report	Kędziora 47'; Mikovič 90+2'	Stadium: Stadion Miejski; Attendance: 14,149; Referee: Tomasz Musiał (Kraków)

=== Polish Cup ===
10 August 2016 Round of 32	Zagłębie Sosnowiec	3–4 (a.e.t)	Wisła Kraków	Sosnowiec
17:30 (CEST) (UTC+2)	Udovičić 22', (red card) 98'; Bartczak (yellow card) 40'; Dudek 69'; Matić 87', (yellow card) 113'	Report	Mójta 42', (yellow card) 49'; Sadlok (yellow card) 62'; Mączyński (yellow card) 64'; Pietrzak (yellow card) 72'; Drzazga 74'; Nowak 77' (o.g.); Załuska (yellow card) 88'; Popović 110' (pen.)	Stadium: Stadion Ludowy; Attendance: 2,427; Referee: Kornel Paszkiewicz (Wrocław)

27 September 2016 Round of 16	Chojniczanka Chojnice	1–2	Wisła Kraków	Chojnice
17:45 (CEST) (UTC+2)	Mikita 5'; Kosakiewicz (yellow card) 53'	Report	Boguski 3'; Ondrášek (yellow card) 49'; Mączyński 76'	Stadium: Stadion Miejski Chojniczanka 1930; Attendance: 3,272; Referee: Zbigniew Dobrynin (Łódź)

25 October 2016 Quarterfinal	Lech Poznań	1–1	Wisła Kraków	Poznań
20:45 (CEST) (UTC+2)	Trałka (yellow card) 58'; Kownacki 78'	Report	Guzmics (yellow card) 23'; Brożek 48'; Sadlok (yellow card) 51'	Stadium: INEA Stadion; Attendance: 0 Referee: Tomasz Kwiatkowski (Warsaw)

30 November 2016 Quarterfinal	Wisła Kraków	2–4	Lech Poznań	Kraków
20:30 (CET) (UTC+1)	Mączyński (yellow card) 23'; Mójta (yellow card) 27' (yellow-red card) 57'; Popović (yellow card) 32'; Brlek 51'; Małecki 66', (yellow card) 90+2'; Żemło (yellow card) 79'	Report	Robak 21' (pen.); Makuszewski 28'; Jevtić 38'; Tetteh (yellow card) 56'; Majewski 82'; Kędziora (yellow card) 90+2'	Stadium: Stadion Miejski; Attendance: 10,507; Referee: Paweł Raczkowski (Warsaw)

== Squad and statistics ==
As of Match played 4 June 2017

=== Appearances and goals ===
No.	Pos	Nat	Player	Total		Ekstraklasa		Polish Cup	
No.	Pos	Nat	Player	Apps	Goals	Apps	Goals	Apps	Goals
1	GK	(Poland) POL	Michał Miśkiewicz	9	0	9+0	0	0+0	0
2	MF	(Poland) POL	Rafał Pietrzak	11	1	4+5	1	1+1	0
3	DF	(Poland) POL	Piotr Żemło	4	0	0+2	0	1+1	0
4	DF	(Poland) POL	Maciej Sadlok	31	0	29+0	0	2+0	0
5	DF	(Slovenia) SVN	Boban Jović	16	0	12+1	0	3+0	0
5	DF	(Poland) POL	Jakub Bartkowski	2	0	1+1	0	0+0	0
6	DF	(Poland) POL	Arkadiusz Głowacki	29	2	26+1	2	2+0	0
7	MF	(Spain) ESP	Pol Llonch	16	0	14+2	0	0+0	0
8	DF	(Poland) POL	Alan Uryga	22	0	17+3	0	2+0	0
9	MF	(Poland) POL	Rafał Boguski	40	13	33+3	12	4+0	1
10	MF	(Slovenia) SVN	Denis Popović	19	1	15+1	0	3+0	1
10	MF	(Colombia) COL	Ever Valencia	2	0	0+2	0	0+0	0
11	MF	(Poland) POL	Wojciech Słomka	1	0	0+1	0	0+0	0
13	MF	(Poland) POL	Krzysztof Drzazga	8	1	3+2	0	0+3	1
14	FW	(Czech Republic) CZE	Zdeněk Ondrášek	26	3	15+9	3	2+0	0
15	MF	(Poland) POL	Adam Mójta	13	3	7+3	2	3+0	1
17	DF	(Poland) POL	Jakub Bartosz	23	3	6+15	3	0+2	0
18	MF	(Bosnia and Herzegovina) BIH	Semir Štilić	14	1	7+7	1	0+0	0
19	DF	(Poland) POL	Tomasz Cywka	28	0	20+5	0	1+2	0
20	MF	(Poland) POL	Mateusz Zachara	31	4	12+15	4	2+2	0
21	MF	(Croatia) CRO	Petar Brlek	35	9	24+7	8	3+1	1
23	FW	(Poland) POL	Paweł Brożek	33	7	25+6	6	2+0	1
24	GK	(Poland) POL	Łukasz Załuska	32	0	28+0	0	4+0	0
26	DF	(Hungary) HUN	Richárd Guzmics	13	1	11+0	1	2+0	0
29	MF	(Poland) POL	Krzysztof Mączyński	35	2	30+1	1	4+0	1
32	DF	(Spain) ESP	Iván González	16	1	16+0	1	0+0	0
33	DF	(Croatia) CRO	Matija Špičić	6	0	6+0	0	0+0	0
40	MF	(Poland) POL	Przemysław Porębski	1	0	0+1	0	0+0	0
47	MF	(Poland) POL	Kacper Laskoś	1	0	0+1	0	0+0	0
88	MF	(Poland) POL	Patryk Małecki	38	9	35+0	8	3+0	1
93	MF	(France) FRA	Hugo Vidémont	8	0	2+6	0	0+0	0

=== Goalscorers ===
Place	Position	Nation	Number	Name	Ekstraklasa	Polish Cup	Total
1	MF	(Poland)	9	Rafał Boguski	12	1	13
2	MF	(Croatia)	21	Petar Brlek	8	1	9
2	MF	(Poland)	88	Patryk Małecki	8	1	9
4	FW	(Poland)	23	Paweł Brożek	6	1	7
5	MF	(Poland)	20	Mateusz Zachara	4	0	4
6	FW	(Czech Republic)	14	Zdeněk Ondrášek	3	0	3
6	DF	(Poland)	15	Adam Mójta	2	1	3
6	DF	(Poland)	17	Jakub Bartosz	3	0	3
9	DF	(Poland)	6	Arkadiusz Głowacki	2	0	2
9	MF	(Poland)	29	Krzysztof Mączyński	1	1	2
11	MF	(Poland)	2	Rafał Pietrzak	1	0	1
11	MF	(Slovenia)	10	Denis Popović	0	1	1
11	MF	(Poland)	13	Krzysztof Drzazga	0	1	1
11	MF	(Bosnia and Herzegovina)	18	Semir Štilić	1	0	1
11	DF	(Hungary)	26	Richárd Guzmics	1	0	1
11	DF	(Spain)	32	Iván González	1	0	1
11	MF	(Poland)	o.g.	Tomasz Nowak	0	1	1
11	DF	(Ukraine)	o.g.	Artem Putivtsev	1	0	1
				TOTALS	54	9	63

=== Assists ===
Place	Position	Nation	Number	Name	Ekstraklasa	Polish Cup	Total
1	MF	(Poland)	29	Krzysztof Mączyński	6	0	6
1	DF	(Slovenia)	5	Boban Jović	3	2	5
3	MF	(Poland)	9	Rafał Boguski	4	0	4
3	FW	(Czech Republic)	14	Zdeněk Ondrášek	3	1	4
3	DF	(Poland)	19	Tomasz Cywka	4	0	4
3	FW	(Poland)	23	Paweł Brożek	3	1	4
5	DF	(Poland)	4	Maciej Sadlok	3	0	3
5	MF	(Poland)	20	Mateusz Zachara	2	1	3
5	MF	(Poland)	88	Patryk Małecki	3	0	3
5	MF	(France)	93	Hugo Vidémont	3	0	3
11	MF	(Slovenia)	10	Denis Popović	1	1	2
11	MF	(Croatia)	21	Petar Brlek	2	0	2
13	DF	(Poland)	15	Adam Mójta	1	0	1
				TOTALS	38	6	44

=== Disciplinary record ===
Number	Nation	Position	Name	Ekstraklasa		Polish Cup		Total	
Number	Nation	Position	Name	Booked	Sent off (straight red)	Booked	Sent off (straight red)	Booked	Sent off (straight red)
4	(Poland)	DF	Maciej Sadlok	9	0	2	0	11	0
29	(Poland)	MF	Krzysztof Mączyński	9	0	2	0	11	0
88	(Poland)	MF	Patryk Małecki	10	0	1	0	11	0
6	(Poland)	DF	Arkadiusz Głowacki	10	0	0	0	10	0
32	(Spain)	DF	Iván González	8	2	0	0	8	2
15	(Poland)	DF	Adam Mójta	4	0	3	1	7	1
10	(Slovenia)	MF	Denis Popović	4	0	1	0	5	0
14	(Czech Republic)	FW	Zdeněk Ondrášek	4	0	1	0	5	0
21	(Croatia)	MF	Petar Brlek	5	0	0	0	5	0
26	(Hungary)	DF	Richárd Guzmics	4	0	1	0	5	0
19	(Poland)	DF	Tomasz Cywka	4	1	0	0	4	1
5	(Slovenia)	DF	Boban Jović	4	0	0	0	4	0
18	(Bosnia and Herzegovina)	MF	Semir Štilić	3	0	0	0	3	0
7	(Spain)	MF	Pol Llonch	2	0	0	0	2	0
8	(Poland)	MF	Alan Uryga	2	0	0	0	2	0
33	(Croatia)	DF	Matija Špičić	2	0	0	0	2	0
2	(Poland)	DF	Rafał Pietrzak	0	0	1	0	1	0
3	(Poland)	DF	Piotr Żemło	0	0	1	0	1	0
5	(Poland)	DF	Jakub Bartkowski	1	0	0	0	1	0
9	(Poland)	MF	Rafał Boguski	1	0	0	0	1	0
17	(Poland)	MF	Jakub Bartosz	1	0	0	0	1	0
23	(Poland)	FW	Paweł Brożek	1	0	0	0	1	0
24	(Poland)	GK	Łukasz Załuska	0	0	1	0	1	0
			TOTALS	87	3	15	1	102	4
