= Patryk Małecki =

Polish footballer (born 1988)

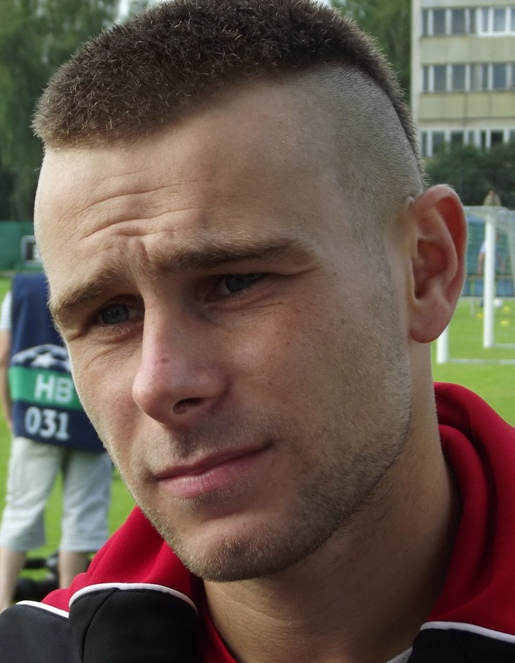
- Małecki in 2011

Personal information
- Full name: Patryk Adrian Małecki
- Date of birth: 1 August 1988 (age 38)
- Place of birth: Suwałki, Poland
- Height: 1.70 m (5 ft 7 in)
- Position: Winger

Team information
- Current team: Wisła Kraków II

Youth career
- 1994–2001: Wigry Suwałki
- 2001–2006: Wisła Kraków

Senior career*
Years	Team	Apps	(Gls)
2006–2014	Wisła Kraków	146	(24)
2007–2008	→ Zagłębie Sosnowiec (loan)	11	(2)
2012–2013	→ Eskişehirspor (loan)	5	(1)
2014–2015	Pogoń Szczecin	36	(1)
2016–2019	Wisła Kraków	75	(11)
2018–2019	→ Spartak Trnava (loan)	7	(1)
2019–2021	Zagłębie Sosnowiec	49	(6)
2021–2023	Stal Rzeszów	57	(10)
2023–2026	Avia Świdnik	74	(17)
2026–	Wisła Kraków II	0	(0)

International career
2003	Poland U15	1	(0)
2003	Poland U16	2	(1)
2005–2006	Poland U18	9	(5)
2006–2007	Poland U19	8	(0)
2007	Poland U20	4	(0)
2007–2009	Poland U21	11	(6)
2009–2011	Poland	8	(2)
- * Club domestic league appearances and goals as of 22:29, 31 May 2026 (UTC)

Patryk Adrian Małecki (Polish pronunciation: [ˈpatrɨk maˈwɛt͡skʲi]; born 1 August 1988) is a Polish professional footballer who plays as a winger for III liga club Wisła Kraków II.

== Club career ==
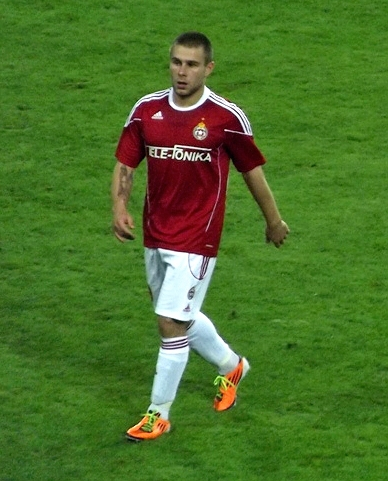
Małecki with Wisła Kraków in 2011

Małecki made his Wisła Kraków and Ekstraklasa debut on 10 September 2006 in a 0–0 draw against Pogoń Szczecin. He scored his first goal against Górnik Zabrze in the 82nd minute to make the final score 4–0 for Wisła.

He was in very good form and was expected to play alongside Paweł Brożek in the attack for Wisła. However, an injury sidelined him for the rest of the season. During the 2008–09 season, he became a regular in Wisła's starting eleven playing on the right wing, replacing Wojciech Łobodziński.

He was chosen as the revelation of the year 2009 and the most promising player for Euro 2012 by Ekstraklasa players. In the Piłka nożna magazine plebiscite, he was chosen as the 2009 Polish Newcomer of the Year.

Malecki was the first Pole to play for Spartak Trnava.

On 22 June 2019, it was announced that Małecki had been sold to Zagłębie Sosnowiec.

== International career ==
Małecki represented Poland at youth international level, including at the 2007 FIFA U-20 World Cup in Canada, where he started in all four games for Poland.

== Career statistics ==
=== Club ===
As of match played 21 March 2026

Appearances and goals by club, season and competition
Club	Season	League			National cup (Note: Includes Polish Cup, Turkish Cup, Slovak Cup)		League cup (Note: Includes Ekstraklasa Cup)		Other		Total	
Club	Season	Division	Apps	Goals	Apps	Goals	Apps	Goals	Apps	Goals	Apps	Goals
Wisła Kraków	2006–07	Ekstraklasa	5	1	0	0	6	0	1 (Note: Appearance(s) in UEFA Cup/UEFA Europa League)	0	12	1
Wisła Kraków	2007–08	Ekstraklasa	7	0	2	0	6	1	—		15	0
Wisła Kraków	2008–09	Ekstraklasa	27	5	4	0	4	0	5 (Note: Three appearances in UEFA Champions League, one appearance in UEFA Cup, one appearance in Polish Super Cup)	0	40	5
Wisła Kraków	2009–10	Ekstraklasa	29	8	3	3	—		3 (Note: Two appearances in UEFA Champions League, one appearance in Polish Super Cup)	0	35	11
Wisła Kraków	2010–11	Ekstraklasa	28	7	4	0	—		4	0	36	7
Wisła Kraków	2011–12	Ekstraklasa	16	0	3	1	—		9 (Note: Five appearances and two goals in UEFA Champions League, four appearances and one goal in UEFA Europa League)	3	28	4
Wisła Kraków	2012–13	Ekstraklasa	13	2	4	2	—		—		17	4
Wisła Kraków	2013–14	Ekstraklasa	21	1	2	0	—		—		23	1
Wisła Kraków	Total		146	24	22	6	16	1	22	3	206	34
Zagłębie Sosnowiec (loan)	2007–08	Ekstraklasa	11	2	—		—		—		11	2
Eskişehirspor (loan)	2012–13	Süper Lig	5	1	1	0	—		4	0	10	1
Pogoń Szczecin	2013–14	Ekstraklasa	13	0	—		—		—		13	0
Pogoń Szczecin	2014–15	Ekstraklasa	11	0	2	2	—		—		13	2
Pogoń Szczecin	2015–16	Ekstraklasa	18	1	0	0	—		—		18	1
Pogoń Szczecin	Total		42	1	2	2	—		—		44	3
Wisła Kraków	2015–16	Ekstraklasa	14	2	—		—		—		14	2
Wisła Kraków	2016–17	Ekstraklasa	35	8	3	1	—		—		38	9
Wisła Kraków	2017–18	Ekstraklasa	21	1	1	0	—		—		22	1
Wisła Kraków	2018–19	Ekstraklasa	5	0	0	0	—		—		5	0
Wisła Kraków	Total		75	11	4	1	—		—		79	12
Spartak Trnava (loan)	2018–19	Slovak First Football League	7	1	3	0	—		4	0	14	1
Zagłębie Sosnowiec	2019–20	I liga	29	4	0	0	—		—		29	4
Zagłębie Sosnowiec	2020–21	I liga	20	2	1	0	—		—		21	2
Zagłębie Sosnowiec	Total		49	6	1	0	—		—		50	6
Stal Rzeszów	2021–22	II liga	28	8	2	0	—		—		30	8
Stal Rzeszów	2022–23	I liga	29	2	2	0	—		—		31	2
Stal Rzeszów	Total		57	10	4	0	—		—		61	10
Avia Świdnik	2023–24	III liga, group IV	26	5	—		—		—		26	5
Avia Świdnik	2024–25	III liga, group IV	32	10	2	0	—		—		34	10
Avia Świdnik	2025–26	III liga, group IV	16	2	2	2	—		—		18	4
Avia Świdnik	Total		74	17	4	2	—		—		78	19
Wisła Kraków II	2026–27	III liga, group IV	0	0	—		—		—		0	0
Career total			466	73	41	11	16	1	30	3	553	88

=== International ===
Appearances and goals by national team and year
National team	Year	Apps	Goals
Poland
Poland	2009	2	0
Poland	2010	5	2
Poland	2011	1	0
Total		8	2

Scores and results list Poland's goal tally first, score column indicates score after each Małecki goal.

List of international goals scored by Patryk Małecki
No.	Date	Venue	Opponent	Score	Result	Competition
1	20 January 2010	80th Birthday Stadium, Nakhon Ratchasima, Thailand	Thailand	2–0	3–1	2010 King's Cup
2	23 January 2010	80th Birthday Stadium, Nakhon Ratchasima, Thailand	Singapore	5–1	6–1	2010 King's Cup

== Honours ==
Wisła Kraków

- Ekstraklasa: 2007–08, 2008–09, 2010–11

Spartak Trnava

- Slovak Cup: 2018–19

Stal Rzeszów

- II liga: 2021–22

Avia Świdnik

- III liga, group IV: 2025–26
- Polish Cup (Lublin regionals): 2023–24, 2024–25
- Polish Cup (Lublin subdistrict regionals): 2023–24, 2024–25, 2025–26

Individual

- Football Oscars' Revelation of the Year: 2009
- Polish Newcomer of the Year: 2009
