= Jakub Bartkowski =

Polish footballer (born 1991)

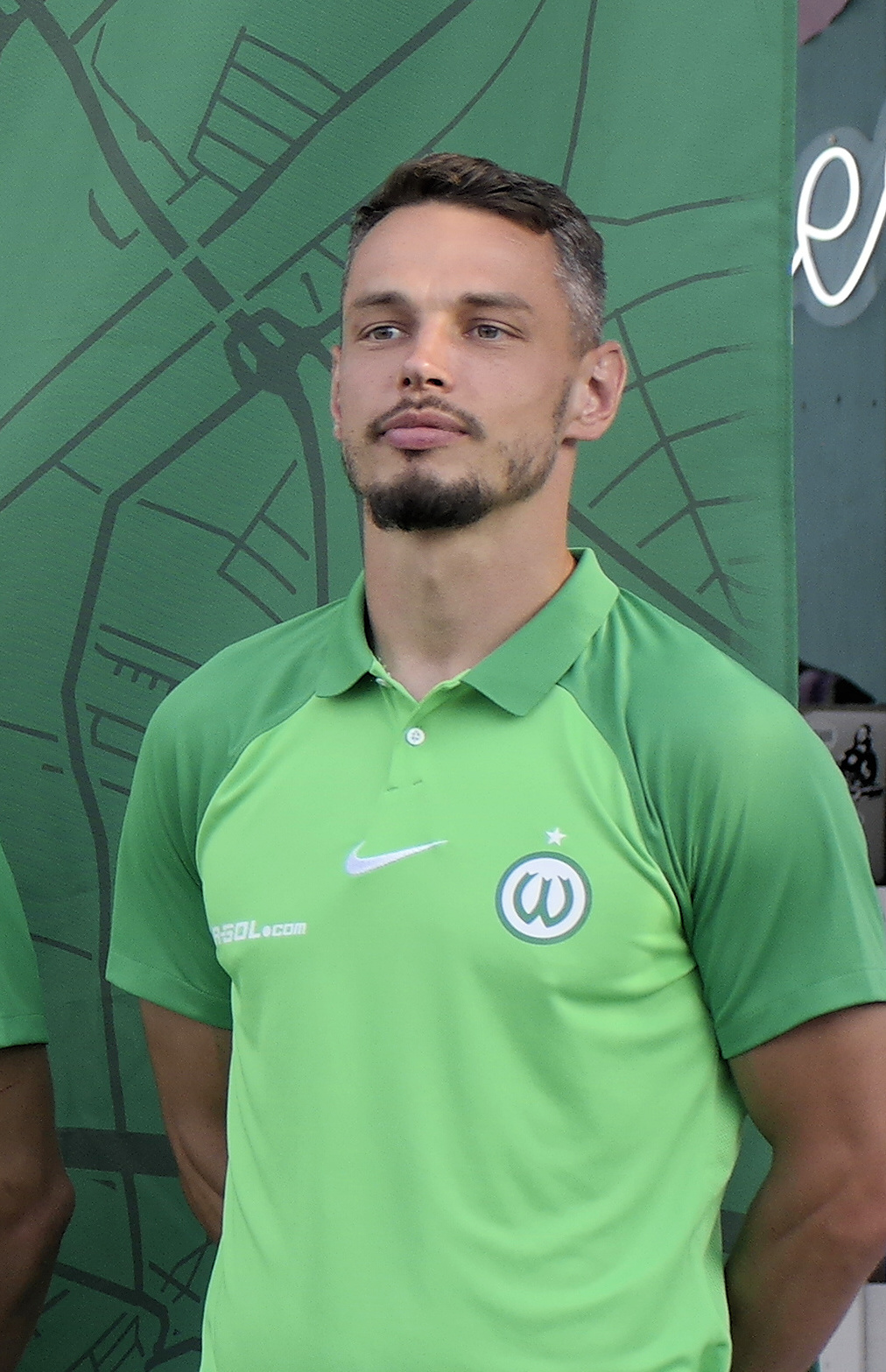
- Bartkowski with Warta Poznań in 2023

Personal information
- Full name: Jakub Bartkowski
- Date of birth: 7 November 1991 (age 35)
- Place of birth: Łódź, Poland
- Height: 1.82 m (5 ft 11 1/2 in)
- Positions: Centre-back; right-back

Team information
- Current team: Victoria Września
- Number: 4

Youth career
- LKS Różyca
- 2009–2011: Widzew Łódź

Senior career*
Years	Team	Apps	(Gls)
2011–2013	Widzew Łódź	54	(0)
2013	Widzew Łódź II	3	(0)
2014–2017	Wigry Suwałki	91	(3)
2017–2019	Wisła Kraków	37	(3)
2019–2023	Pogoń Szczecin	100	(3)
2019–2020	Pogoń Szczecin II	2	(0)
2023	Lechia Gdańsk	16	(1)
2023–2025	Warta Poznań	58	(1)
2025–	Victoria Września	32	(8)

International career
2011	Poland U20	1	(0)
2012	Poland U21	1	(0)
- * Club domestic league appearances and goals as of 22:15, 29 July 2026 (UTC)

Jakub Bartkowski (born 7 November 1991) is a Polish professional footballer who plays as a centre-back or right-back for III liga club Victoria Września. He also works as a youth coach for GES Sport Academy Poznań.

== Career statistics ==
As of match played 30 May 2026

Appearances and goals by club, season and competition
Club	Season	League			Polish Cup		Europe		Other		Total	
Club	Season	Division	Apps	Goals	Apps	Goals	Apps	Goals	Apps	Goals	Apps	Goals
Widzew Łódź	2011–12	Ekstraklasa	22	0	2	0	—		—		24	0
Widzew Łódź	2012–13	Ekstraklasa	19	0	1	0	—		—		20	0
Widzew Łódź	2013–14	Ekstraklasa	13	0	2	0	—		—		15	0
Widzew Łódź	Total		54	0	5	0	—		—		59	0
Widzew Łódź II	2013–14	III liga, gr. A	3	0	—		—		—		3	0
Wigry Suwałki	2013–14	II liga East	12	0	—		—		—		12	0
Wigry Suwałki	2014–15	I liga	31	0	3	0	—		—		34	0
Wigry Suwałki	2015–16	I liga	31	1	2	0	—		—		33	1
Wigry Suwałki	2016–17	I liga	17	2	4	0	—		—		21	2
Wigry Suwałki	Total		91	3	9	0	—		—		100	3
Wisła Kraków	2016–17	Ekstraklasa	2	0	—		—		—		2	0
Wisła Kraków	2017–18	Ekstraklasa	17	2	0	0	—		—		17	2
Wisła Kraków	2018–19	Ekstraklasa	18	1	1	0	—		—		19	1
Wisła Kraków	Total		37	1	4	1	—		—		41	2
Pogoń Szczecin	2018–19	Ekstraklasa	13	0	—		—		—		13	0
Pogoń Szczecin	2019–20	Ekstraklasa	25	0	2	0	—		—		27	0
Pogoń Szczecin	2020–21	Ekstraklasa	21	1	1	0	—		—		22	1
Pogoń Szczecin	2021–22	Ekstraklasa	27	1	1	1	2 (Note: Appearances in UEFA Europa Conference League)	0	—		30	2
Pogoń Szczecin	2022–23	Ekstraklasa	14	1	1	0	4	1	—		19	2
Pogoń Szczecin	Total		100	3	5	1	6	1	—		111	5
Pogoń Szczecin II	2019–20	III liga, gr. II	1	0	—		—		—		1	0
Pogoń Szczecin II	2020–21	III liga, gr. II	1	0	—		—		—		1	0
Pogoń Szczecin II	Total		2	0	—		—		—		2	0
Lechia Gdańsk	2022–23	Ekstraklasa	16	1	—		—		—		16	1
Warta Poznań	2023–24	Ekstraklasa	30	0	2	0	—		—		32	0
Warta Poznań	2024–25	I liga	28	1	2	0	—		—		30	1
Warta Poznań	Total		58	1	4	0	—		—		62	1
Victoria Września	2025–26	III liga, gr. II	32	8	—		—		—		32	8
Career total			393	19	24	1	6	1	0	0	423	21

== Honours ==
Wigry Suwałki

- II liga East: 2013–14
