= Zé Manuel (footballer, born 1990) =

Portuguese footballer

Personal information
- Full name: José Manuel Silva Oliveira
- Date of birth: 23 October 1990 (age 36)
- Place of birth: Braga, Portugal
- Height: 1.78 m (5 ft 10 in)
- Position: Winger

Team information
- Current team: Merelinense

Youth career
- 2003–2004: Trabalhadores Nogueirense
- 2004–2008: Merelinense
- 2008–2009: Braga

Senior career*
Years	Team	Apps	(Gls)
2008	Merelinense	7	(3)
2009	Braga	1	(0)
2009–2011	Merelinense	48	(2)
2011–2012	Vizela	28	(12)
2012–2013	Braga B	8	(0)
2013	→ Cinfães (loan)	10	(3)
2013−2016	Boavista	91	(17)
2016−2018	Porto	0	(0)
2016−2017	→ Vitória Setúbal (loan)	28	(2)
2017−2018	→ Wisła Kraków (loan)	7	(0)
2018	→ Feirense (loan)	4	(0)
2018−2020	Santa Clara	54	(12)
2020−2021	Gaz Metan Mediaș	27	(3)
2021−2024	Rio Ave	57	(7)
2022−2023	→ Nacional (loan)	29	(6)
2024–2025	Oliveirense	31	(3)
2025–2026	Varzim	11	(0)
2026–	Merelinense	1	(0)

International career
2007−2008	Portugal U18	4	(0)
- * Club domestic league appearances and goals as of 13 September 2026

José Manuel Silva Oliveira (born 23 October 1990), commonly known as Zé Manuel, is a Portuguese professional footballer who plays as a winger for Merelinense.

== Club career ==
Born in Braga, Zé Manuel finished his youth career with local club S.C. Braga. He spent the better part of his first three seasons as a senior in the third division with Merelinense FC, but also managed to appear once in the Primeira Liga with Braga, coming on as an 88th-minute substitute in a 1−1 away draw against FC Porto on 24 May 2009.

Having returned to his hometown in the summer of 2011, Zé Manuel represented exclusively F.C. Vizela (farm team, third tier) and the reserves (Segunda Liga). For the second part of the 2012–13 campaign, he was also loaned to division-three side C.D. Cinfães.

In the 2013 off-season, Zé Manuel signed with Boavista F.C. who competed in the third division, being immediately promoted to the top flight as a result of the consequences of the Apito Dourado affair. He made his debut with the club in the latter competition on 17 August 2014, featuring 60 minutes in a 3–0 loss at his former team Braga. He produced exactly the same numbers in his second and third seasons, scoring six goals in 31 matches.

On 25 June 2016, free agent Zé Manuel joined Porto on a five-year contract. He never appeared for them in competitive games, being successively loaned to Vitória de Setúbal, Wisła Kraków and C.D. Feirense.

Zé Manuel agreed to a two-year deal at newly-promoted C.D. Santa Clara in July 2018. At one point during his spell in the Azores, he was their all-time scorer in the Portuguese top tier.

In October 2020, Zé Manuel signed for CS Gaz Metan Mediaș of the Romanian Liga I. The following 2 July, he returned to his country on a two-year contract with second-division Rio Ave FC.
