= Krzysztof Drzazga =

Polish footballer (born 1995)

Personal information
- Full name: Krzysztof Drzazga
- Date of birth: 20 June 1995 (age 31)
- Place of birth: Szprotawa, Poland
- Height: 1.80 m (5 ft 11 in)
- Positions: Forward; attacking midfielder

Team information
- Current team: Odra Bytom Odrzański
- Number: 11

Youth career
- –2005: Zamet Przemków
- 2006–2007: Arkon Przemków
- 2007–2010: Zamet Przemków
- 2011–2012: KS Polkowice

Senior career*
Years	Team	Apps	(Gls)
2013–2015	KS Polkowice	50	(36)
2016–2020	Wisła Kraków	41	(5)
2016–2019	Wisła Kraków II	9	(9)
2017	→ Stal Mielec (loan)	15	(4)
2017	→ Chojniczanka Chojnice (loan)	6	(0)
2018	→ Puszcza Niepołomice (loan)	30	(9)
2020–2022	Miedź Legnica	38	(9)
2022	Miedź Legnica II	1	(0)
2022–2023	Podbeskidzie Bielsko-Biała	30	(3)
2023–2025	Miedź Legnica	46	(2)
2025	Warta Poznań	14	(1)
2025–	Odra Bytom Odrzański	32	(38)
- * Club domestic league appearances and goals as of 08:35, 26 June 2026 (UTC)

Krzysztof Drzazga (born 20 June 1995) is a Polish professional footballer who plays as a forward for III liga club Odra Bytom Odrzański.

== Club career ==
Drzazga scored his first goal for Wisła Kraków on 9 August 2016 in a Polish Cup match against Zagłębie Sosnowiec.

On 9 March 2019, he scored his first goals in the Ekstraklasa by scoring a hat-trick in a 6–2 victory against Korona Kielce. He followed that up by scoring the opening goal in a 3–2 victory over Cracovia.

On 31 July 2020, he signed a two-year contract with Miedź Legnica.

On 26 May 2022, Drzazga moved to another I liga side Podbeskidzie Bielsko-Biała on a two-year deal.

On 14 June 2023, he rejoined Miedź, signing a deal until June 2025.

On 13 January 2025, after being close to joining Stal Stalowa Wola on loan, Drzazga moved to another I liga club involved in the relegation battle, Warta Poznań, on an eighteen-month contract. On 25 June 2025, he terminated his contract with Warta by mutual consent.

On 24 July 2025, Drzazga joined fifth division club Odra Bytom Odrzański.

== Career statistics ==
As of match played 3 June 2026

Appearances and goals by club, season and competition
Club	Season	League			Polish Cup		Europe		Other		Total	
Club	Season	Division	Apps	Goals	Apps	Goals	Apps	Goals	Apps	Goals	Apps	Goals
KS Polkowice	2013–14	II liga	3	0	2	0	—		—		5	0
KS Polkowice	2014–15	IV liga Lower Silesia	29	15	1	0	—		—		30	15
KS Polkowice	2015–16	III liga, gr. E	18	21	—		—		—		18	21
KS Polkowice	Total		50	36	3	0	—		—		53	36
Wisła Kraków	2015–16	Ekstraklasa	7	0	—		—		—		7	0
Wisła Kraków	2016–17	Ekstraklasa	5	0	3	1	—		—		8	1
Wisła Kraków	2018–19	Ekstraklasa	17	5	—		—		—		17	5
Wisła Kraków	2019–20	Ekstraklasa	12	0	1	0	—		—		13	0
Wisła Kraków	Total		41	5	4	1	—		—		45	6
Wisła Kraków II	2015–16	III liga, gr. G	7	7	—		—		—		7	0
Wisła Kraków II	2016–17	III liga, gr. IV	1	2	—		—		—		1	2
Wisła Kraków II	2019–20	IV liga Les. Pol. West	1	0	—		—		—		1	0
Wisła Kraków II	Total		9	9	—		—		—		9	9
Stal Mielec (loan)	2016–17	I liga	15	4	—		—		—		15	4
Chojniczanka Chojnice (loan)	2017–18	I liga	6	0	3	0	—		—		9	0
Puszcza Niepołomice (loan)	2017–18	I liga	10	2	—		—		—		10	2
Puszcza Niepołomice (loan)	2018–19	I liga	20	7	2	3	—		—		22	10
Puszcza Niepołomice (loan)	Total		30	9	2	3	—		—		32	12
Miedź Legnica	2020–21	I liga	28	4	1	0	—		—		29	4
Miedź Legnica	2021–22	I liga	10	5	0	0	—		—		10	5
Miedź Legnica	Total		38	9	1	0	—		—		39	9
Miedź Legnica II	2022–23	III liga, gr. III	1	0	—		—		—		1	0
Podbeskidzie	2022–23	I liga	30	3	1	0	—		—		31	3
Miedź Legnica	2023–24	I liga	31	2	1	0	—		—		32	2
Miedź Legnica	2024–25	I liga	15	0	2	0	—		—		17	0
Miedź Legnica	Total		46	2	3	0	—		—		49	2
Warta Poznań	2024–25	I liga	14	1	—		—		—		14	1
Odra Bytom Odrzański	2025–26	IV liga Lubusz	32	38	1	0	—		—		33	38
Career total			312	116	18	4	0	0	0	0	330	120

== Honours ==
Miedź Legnica

- I liga: 2021–22

Odra Bytom Odrzański

- IV liga Lubusz: 2025–26

Individual

- IV liga Lubusz top scorer: 2025–26
