= Adam Mójta =

Polish footballer

Personal information
- Full name: Adam Mójta
- Date of birth: 30 June 1986 (age 40)
- Place of birth: Jelenia Góra, Poland
- Height: 1.78 m (5 ft 10 in)
- Position: Defender

Youth career
- Karkonosze Jelenia Góra

Senior career*
Years	Team	Apps	(Gls)
2003–2006	Miedź Legnica		(0)
2007–2009	Korona Kielce	1	(0)
2009	→ Pelikan Łowicz (loan)	15	(3)
2009–2010	Odra Wodzisław	8	(1)
2010–2011	Viktoria Žižkov	23	(0)
2011	Zagłębie Sosnowiec	10	(0)
2012	Warta Poznań	10	(0)
2013–2014	Sandecja Nowy Sącz	41	(7)
2014–2015	GKS Bełchatów	29	(2)
2015–2016	Podbeskidzie Bielsko-Biała	31	(7)
2016–2017	Wisła Kraków	10	(2)
2017–2019	Piast Gliwice	10	(0)
2019–2020	Pogoń Siedlce	54	(12)
2020–2021	ŁKS Łagów	21	(0)
- * Club domestic league appearances and goals

Adam Mójta (born 30 June 1986) is a Polish former professional footballer who played as a defender.

== Club career ==
On 20 August 2020, he joined III liga club ŁKS Łagów.
