= Przemysław Porębski =

Polish footballer (born 1998)

Personal information
- Date of birth: 30 June 1998 (age 28)
- Place of birth: Kraków, Poland
- Height: 1.70 m (5 ft 7 in)
- Position: Midfielder

Youth career
- –2014: Wisła Kraków

Senior career*
Years	Team	Apps	(Gls)
2014–2017	Wisła Kraków II	16	(0)
2016–2017	Wisła Kraków	1	(0)
2017–2018	MKS Trzebinia-Siersza	34	(5)
2018–2019	Miedź Legnica II	27	(4)
2019–2023	Orzeł Ryczów	83	(10)
- * Club domestic league appearances and goals as of 15:01, 27 June 2025 (UTC)

Przemysław Porębski (born 30 June 1998) is a Polish professional footballer who plays as a midfielder.

== Honours ==
Orzeł Ryczów

- Polish Cup (Wadowice subdistrict regionals): 2021–22
- Polish Cup (Wadowice County regionals): 2019–20
