= Krzysztof Mączyński =

Polish footballer (born 1987)

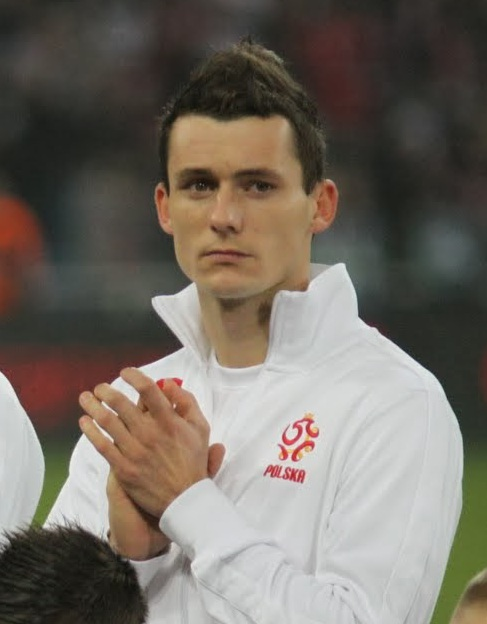

Personal information
- Date of birth: 23 May 1987 (age 39)
- Place of birth: Kraków, Poland
- Height: 1.75 m (5 ft 9 in)
- Position: Midfielder

Youth career
- –2006: Wisła Kraków

Senior career*
| Years | Team | Apps | (Gls) |
| 2006–2007 | Wisła Kraków II | | |
| 2007–2011 | Wisła Kraków | 8 | (0) |
| 2009 | → ŁKS Łódź (loan) | 13 | (1) |
| 2010–2011 | → ŁKS Łódź (loan) | 30 | (3) |
| 2011–2014 | Górnik Zabrze | 73 | (2) |
| 2014–2015 | Guizhou Renhe | 36 | (4) |
| 2015–2017 | Wisła Kraków | 55 | (3) |
| 2017–2018 | Legia Warsaw | 30 | (2) |
| 2018 | Legia Warsaw II | 3 | (1) |
| 2019–2022 | Śląsk Wrocław | 92 | (6) |
| 2022–2023 | Śląsk Wrocław II | 1 | (0) |
| Total | | 341 | (22) |

International career
| 2013–2018 | Poland | 31 | (2) |
- * Club domestic league appearances and goals

Krzysztof Mączyński (Polish pronunciation: [ˈkʂɨʂtɔf mɔnˈtʂɨɲskʲi, -ɨj̃skʲi]; born 23 May 1987) is a Polish former professional footballer who played as a midfielder.

== Club career ==
He is a trainee of Wisła Kraków. He scored his first goal for Wisła in the Ekstraklasa Cup match against Górnik Zabrze on 28 November 2007. Mączyński debuted in Ekstraklasa in the game versus Górnik Zabrze on 2 December 2007.

In August 2011, he joined Górnik Zabrze on a two-year contract.

On 8 January 2014 he signed for Guizhou Renhe.

On 7 July 2017 he signed a contract with Legia Warsaw.

== International career ==
On 15 November 2013, Mączyński made his debut for Poland national team in an international friendly against Slovakia, coming on as a substitute for Tomasz Jodłowiec in the 76th minute.

On 14 October 2014, he scored for the first time in international competition in a Euro 2016 Qualifying game against Scotland in group D, giving Poland a 1–0 lead in the 11th minute.

In May 2018 he was named in Poland's preliminary 35-man squad for the 2018 World Cup in Russia. However, he did not make the final 23.

== Career statistics ==
=== Club ===
Appearances and goals by club, season and competition
| Club | Season | League | | | National cup (Note: Includes Polish Cup, Chinese FA Cup) | | Continental | | Other | | Total | |
| Club | Season | Division | Apps | Goals | Apps | Goals | Apps | Goals | Apps | Goals | Apps | Goals |
|---|---|---|---|---|---|---|---|---|---|---|---|---|
| Wisła Kraków | 2007–08 | Ekstraklasa | 2 | 0 | 1 | 0 | 0 | 0 | 8 (Note: Appearances in Ekstraklasa Cup) | 1 | 11 | 1 |
| Wisła Kraków | 2008–09 | Ekstraklasa | 0 | 0 | 0 | 0 | 0 | 0 | 6 (Note: Five appearances in Ekstraklasa Cup, one appearance in Polish Super Cup) | 0 | 6 | 0 |
| Wisła Kraków | 2009–10 | Ekstraklasa | 6 | 0 | 2 | 0 | 0 | 0 | 0 | 0 | 8 | 0 |
| Wisła Kraków | Total | | 8 | 0 | 3 | 0 | 0 | 0 | 14 | 1 | 25 | 1 |
| ŁKS Łódź (loan) | 2009–10 | I liga | 13 | 1 | 1 | 0 | — | | — | | 14 | 1 |
| ŁKS Łódź (loan) | 2010–11 | I liga | 30 | 3 | 2 | 0 | — | | — | | 32 | 3 |
| ŁKS Łódź (loan) | Total | | 43 | 4 | 3 | 0 | — | | — | | 46 | 4 |
| Górnik Zabrze | 2011–12 | Ekstraklasa | 26 | 0 | 1 | 0 | — | | — | | 27 | 0 |
| Górnik Zabrze | 2012–13 | Ekstraklasa | 26 | 1 | 1 | 0 | — | | — | | 27 | 1 |
| Górnik Zabrze | 2013–14 | Ekstraklasa | 21 | 1 | 2 | 0 | – | | — | | 23 | 1 |
| Górnik Zabrze | Total | | 73 | 2 | 4 | 0 | — | | — | | 77 | 2 |
| Guizhou Renhe | 2014 | Chinese Super League | 27 | 3 | 0 | 0 | — | | 1 (Note: Appearance in Chinese FA Super Cup) | 0 | 28 | 3 |
| Guizhou Renhe | 2015 | Chinese Super League | 9 | 1 | 0 | 0 | — | | — | | 9 | 1 |
| Guizhou Renhe | Total | | 36 | 4 | 0 | 0 | — | | 1 | 0 | 37 | 4 |
| Wisła Kraków | 2015–16 | Ekstraklasa | 24 | 2 | 1 | 0 | — | | — | | 25 | 2 |
| Wisła Kraków | 2016–17 | Ekstraklasa | 31 | 1 | 4 | 0 | — | | — | | 35 | 1 |
| Wisła Kraków | Total | | 55 | 3 | 5 | 0 | — | | — | | 60 | 3 |
| Legia Warsaw | 2017–18 | Ekstraklasa | 26 | 1 | 3 | 1 | 6 (Note: Two appearances in UEFA Champions League, four appearances in UEFA Europa League) | 0 | 0 | 0 | 35 | 2 |
| Legia Warsaw | 2018–19 | Ekstraklasa | 4 | 1 | 0 | 0 | 6 (Note: Four appearances in UEFA Champions League, two appearances in UEFA Europa League) | 0 | 1 (Note: Appearance in Polish Super Cup) | 0 | 11 | 1 |
| Legia Warsaw | Total | | 30 | 2 | 3 | 1 | 12 | 0 | 1 | 0 | 46 | 3 |
| Legia Warsaw II | 2018–19 | III liga, gr. I | 3 | 1 | — | | — | | — | | 3 | 1 |
| Śląsk Wrocław | 2018–19 | Ekstraklasa | 15 | 0 | — | | — | | — | | 15 | 0 |
| Śląsk Wrocław | 2019–20 | Ekstraklasa | 29 | 4 | 0 | 0 | — | | — | | 29 | 4 |
| Śląsk Wrocław | 2020–21 | Ekstraklasa | 18 | 2 | 0 | 0 | — | | — | | 18 | 2 |
| Śląsk Wrocław | 2021–22 | Ekstraklasa | 30 | 0 | 1 | 0 | 6 (Note: Appearances in UEFA Europa Conference League) | 0 | — | | 37 | 0 |
| Śląsk Wrocław | Total | | 92 | 6 | 1 | 0 | 6 | 0 | — | | 99 | 6 |
| Śląsk Wrocław II | 2022–23 | II liga | 1 | 0 | 1 | 0 | — | | — | | 2 | 0 |
| Career total | | | 341 | 22 | 20 | 1 | 18 | 0 | 16 | 1 | 395 | 24 |

=== International ===
Appearances and goals by national team and year
| National team | Year | Apps | Goals |
|---|---|---|---|
| Poland | 2013 | 2 | 0 |
| Poland | 2014 | 4 | 1 |
| Poland | 2015 | 8 | 0 |
| Poland | 2016 | 8 | 0 |
| Poland | 2017 | 8 | 1 |
| Poland | 2018 | 1 | 0 |
| Total | | 31 | 2 |

Scores and results list Poland's goal tally first, score column indicates score after each Mączyński goal.

List of international goals scored by Krzysztof Mączyński
| No. | Date | Venue | Opponent | Score | Result | Competition |
|---|---|---|---|---|---|---|
| 1 | 14 October 2014 | Stadion Narodowy, Warsaw, Poland | Scotland | 1–0 | 2–2 | UEFA Euro 2016 qualifying |
| 2 | 8 October 2017 | Stadion Narodowy, Warsaw, Poland | Montenegro | 1–0 | 4–2 | 2018 FIFA World Cup qualification |

== Honours ==
Wisła Kraków

- Ekstraklasa: 2007–08

Wisła Kraków (ME)

- Młoda Ekstraklasa: 2007–08

ŁKS Łódź

- I liga: 2010–11

Guizhou Renhe

- Chinese FA Super Cup: 2014

Legia Warsaw

- Ekstraklasa: 2017–18
- Polish Cup: 2017–18
