= Cristian Echavarría =

Colombian footballer (born 1997)

Personal information
- Full name: Cristian David Echavarría Vélez
- Date of birth: 10 June 1997 (age 29)
- Place of birth: Medellín, Colombia
- Height: 1.65 m (5 ft 5 in)
- Position: Midfielder

Youth career
- Independiente Medellín

Senior career*
| Years | Team | Apps | (Gls) |
| 2016–2017 | Independiente Medellín | 0 | (0) |
| 2016 | → Venados (loan) | 1 | (0) |
| 2017 | → Wisła Kraków (loan) | 0 | (0) |
| 2017 | SJK | 0 | (0) |
| 2017 | Honka | 4 | (0) |
| 2018 | Patriotas | 9 | (0) |
| 2019–2020 | Independiente Medellín | 7 | (0) |
| 2020 | → Jaguares de Córdoba (loan) | 0 | (0) |
| Total | | 21 | (0) |
- * Club domestic league appearances and goals

Cristian David Echavarría Vélez (born 10 July 1997) is a Colombian former professional footballer who played as a midfielder.

== Career ==
He was a youth champion with Independiente Medellín.

In 2017, he was brought to Europe alongside Ever Valencia on loan from Independiente Medellín to Wisła Kraków, having already spent a few months in Mexico's Venados. Valencia had been discovered at the 2017 South American U-20 Championship squads, whereas Echavarría was brought along. The loan took a long time to formalize, and the players' acclimatization was very slow. As a result, Echavarría never played or even appeared on the bench. In addition, the two players committed a faux pas online, as they visited Auschwitz-Birkenau concentration camp and took photographs "with wide-eyed smiles, failing to maintain even the slightest pretense of seriousness", being "apparently unaware of what had happened there".

Echavarría remained in Europe, however. In June 2017, Echavarría signed for SJK.

In 2018 he played for Patriotas Boyacá, returning as a free agent to Independiente Medellín in 2019. After the 2019 season, a loan was negotiated with Jaguares de Córdoba.

== Honours ==
Independiente Medellín

- Copa Colombia: 2019
