= Kacper Laskoś =

Polish footballer

Personal information
- Full name: Kacper Laskoś
- Date of birth: 5 January 2000 (age 26)
- Place of birth: Gorlice, Poland
- Height: 1.84 m (6 ft 0 in)
- Position: Midfielder

Team information
- Current team: ÍBU Uppsveitir

Youth career
- 2008–2010: LKS Szymbark
- 2010–2011: Glinik Gorlice
- 2012–2013: Dunajec Nowy Sącz
- 2013–2014: Sandecja Nowy Sącz
- 2014–2017: Wisła Kraków

Senior career*
Years	Team	Apps	(Gls)
2017–2019	Wisła Kraków	1	(0)
2019–2020	GKS Tychy	0	(0)
2020	→ KSZO Ostrowiec (loan)	1	(0)
2020–2021	Garbarnia Kraków	31	(0)
2022	LKS Wójtowa	9	(1)
2022–2023	KS Biecz	13	(3)
2023	Pcimianka Pcim	22	(1)
2025–	PÍBU Uppsveitir		

International career
2016	Poland U16	3	(0)
2016	Poland U17	1	(0)
2017	Poland U18	3	(0)
- * Club domestic league appearances and goals as of 4 January 2024

Kacper Laskoś (born 5 January 2000) is a Polish professional footballer who plays as midfielder for Icelandic club PÍBU Uppsveitir.

== Career ==
=== GKS Tychy ===
On 13 February 2019, Laskoś joined GKS Tychy.

=== Garbarnia Kraków ===
On 13 August 2020, he signed a one-and-a-half-year contract with Garbarnia Kraków.

== International career ==
Laskoś played three games for Poland U16, one for Poland U17 and three for Poland U18.

== Honours ==
KSZO Ostrowiec Świętokrzyski

- Polish Cup (Świętokrzyskie regionals): 2019–20
