= Jakub Żubrowski =

Polish footballer

Personal information
- Full name: Jakub Żubrowski
- Date of birth: 21 March 1992 (age 34)
- Place of birth: Szczecin, Poland
- Height: 1.81 m (5 ft 11 in)
- Position: Midfielder

Team information
- Current team: Korona Kielce III (manager)

Youth career
- –2012: Korona Kielce

Senior career*
Years	Team	Apps	(Gls)
2012–2013	Korona Kielce	0	(0)
2012–2013	→ Stal Mielec (loan)	26	(0)
2013–2016	Stal Mielec	88	(6)
2017–2020	Korona Kielce	101	(2)
2020–2023	Zagłębie Lubin	45	(1)
2021–2023	Zagłębie Lubin II	3	(0)
2023–2025	Kotwica Kołobrzeg	11	(1)
Total		274	(10)

Managerial career
- 2025–: Korona Kielce III
- 2026: Korona Kielce U19
- * Club domestic league appearances and goals

Jakub Żubrowski (born 21 March 1992) is a Polish former professional footballer who played as a midfielder. He is currently in charge of Korona Kielce III.

== Club career ==
On 27 July 2020, he signed a three-year contract with Zagłębie Lubin.

== Career statistics ==
Appearances and goals by club, season and competition
Club	Season	League			Polish Cup		Europe		Other		Total	
Club	Season	Division	Apps	Goals	Apps	Goals	Apps	Goals	Apps	Goals	Apps	Goals
Stal Mielec (loan)	2012–13	III liga, group H	26	0	—		—		—		26	0
Stal Mielec	2013–14	II liga East	21	0	—		—		—		21	0
Stal Mielec	2014–15	II liga	27	1	1	0	—		—		28	1
Stal Mielec	2015–16	II liga	30	3	1	0	—		—		31	3
Stal Mielec	2016–17	I liga	10	2	3	0	—		—		13	2
Stal Mielec	Total		114	6	5	0	—		—		119	6
Korona Kielce	2016–17	Ekstraklasa	13	1	0	0	—		—		13	1
Korona Kielce	2017–18	Ekstraklasa	28	0	4	0	—		—		32	0
Korona Kielce	2018–19	Ekstraklasa	32	0	1	0	—		—		33	0
Korona Kielce	2019–20	Ekstraklasa	28	1	0	0	—		—		28	1
Korona Kielce	Total		101	2	5	0	—		—		106	2
Zagłębie Lubin	2020–21	Ekstraklasa	27	0	3	1	—		—		30	1
Zagłębie Lubin	2021–22	Ekstraklasa	16	1	1	0	—		—		17	1
Zagłębie Lubin	2022–23	Ekstraklasa	2	0	0	0	—		—		2	0
Zagłębie Lubin	Total		45	1	4	1	—		—		49	2
Zagłębie Lubin II	2021–22	III liga, group III	1	0	—		—		—		1	0
Zagłębie Lubin II	2022–23	II liga	2	0	—		—		—		2	0
Zagłębie Lubin II	Total		3	0	—		—		—		3	0
Kotwica Kołobrzeg	2023–24	II liga	11	1	0	0	—		—		11	1
Kotwica Kołobrzeg	2024–25	I liga	0	0	0	0	—		—		0	0
Kotwica Kołobrzeg	Total		11	1	0	0	—		—		11	1
Career total			274	10	14	1	—		—		288	11

== Honours ==
Stal Mielec

- II liga: 2015–16
- III liga Lublin-Subcarpathia: 2012–13

Zagłębie Lubin II

- III liga, group III: 2021–22
