= Jakub Bartosz =

Polish footballer

Personal information
- Date of birth: 13 August 1996 (age 30)
- Place of birth: Myślenice, Poland
- Height: 1.83 m (6 ft 0 in)
- Position: Right midfielder

Youth career
- Hejnał Krzyszkowice
- Karpaty Siepraw
- Wisła Kraków

Senior career*
| Years | Team | Apps | (Gls) |
| 2013–2016 | Wisła Kraków II | 54 | (11) |
| 2014–2020 | Wisła Kraków | 50 | (4) |
| 2018 | → Sandecja Nowy Sącz (loan) | 13 | (0) |
| 2020 | Stal Mielec | 6 | (0) |
| 2020–2024 | Puszcza Niepołomice | 89 | (7) |
| 2024–2026 | Odra Opole | 25 | (0) |

International career
| 2012 | Poland U17 | 1 | (0) |
| 2014 | Poland U19 | 1 | (0) |
| 2017 | Poland U20 | 3 | (0) |
| 2017–2018 | Poland U21 | 4 | (1) |
- * Club domestic league appearances and goals as of 08:30, 27 May 2026 (UTC)

Jakub Bartosz (born 13 August 1996) is a Polish professional footballer who plays as a right midfielder.

== Club career ==
On 11 August 2020, he joined Puszcza Niepołomice.

He spent four years with Puszcza before joining I liga club Odra Opole on 28 June 2024, signing a two-year contract with an option for another year.

== Honours ==
Stal Mielec

- I liga: 2019–20
