= Piotr Żemło =

Polish footballer

Personal information
- Full name: Piotr Żemło
- Date of birth: 10 July 1995 (age 31)
- Place of birth: Giżycko, Poland
- Height: 1.90 m (6 ft 3 in)
- Position: Centre back

Team information
- Current team: Stal Stalowa Wola
- Number: 6

Youth career
- –2011: Mamry Giżycko
- 2011–2013: Wisła Kraków

Senior career*
Years	Team	Apps	(Gls)
2014–2016	Wisła Kraków II	55	(5)
2014–2018	Wisła Kraków	8	(0)
2017–2018	→ Wisła Puławy (loan)	37	(1)
2018–2025	Odra Opole	138	(6)
2025–	Stal Stalowa Wola	23	(2)

International career
2013	Poland U18	2	(0)
- * Club domestic league appearances and goals as of 11:19, 31 May 2026 (UTC)

Piotr Żemło (born 10 July 1995) is a Polish professional footballer who plays as a centre back for II liga club Stal Stalowa Wola.
