= Mateusz Zachara =

Polish footballer (born 1990)

Personal information
- Full name: Mateusz Zachara
- Date of birth: 27 March 1990 (age 36)
- Place of birth: Częstochowa, Poland
- Height: 1.80 m (5 ft 11 in)
- Position: Forward

Team information
- Current team: Lot Konopiska
- Number: 9

Youth career
- Raków Częstochowa

Senior career*
Years	Team	Apps	(Gls)
2008–2010	Raków Częstochowa	85	(22)
2011–2015	Górnik Zabrze	63	(20)
2011–2012	→ Katowice (loan)	29	(7)
2015–2016	Henan Jianye	23	(4)
2016–2017	Wisła Kraków	27	(4)
2017	Tondela	4	(0)
2018–2019	Raków Częstochowa	13	(0)
2019	Pohronie	14	(2)
2020–2021	Železiarne Podbrezová	7	(3)
2021	Široki Brijeg	9	(1)
2022	ŁKS Łagów	15	(2)
2022–2024	MKS Myszków	56	(26)
2024–2025	Szombierki Bytom	25	(13)
2025–	Lot Konopiska	25	(12)

International career
2014	Poland	2	(0)
- * Club domestic league appearances and goals as of 17:26, 30 June 2026 (UTC)

Mateusz Zachara (Polish pronunciation: [maˈtɛ.uʐ zaˈxara]; (Note: In isolation, Mateusz is pronounced [maˈtɛ.uʂ].) born 27 March 1990) is a Polish professional footballer who plays as a forward for regional league club Lot Konopiska. He also played for the Poland national team.

== Club career ==
In January 2011, Zachara joined Górnik Zabrze on a three-and-a-half-year contract. In July 2011, he was loaned to GKS Katowice on a one-year deal.

On 21 January 2015, he joined Chinese Super League side Henan Jianye on a three-year contract. On 20 June 2017, Zachara signed a contract with Portuguese side Tondela. On 27 November, he returned to Raków Częstochowa. After Raków Częstochowa, he played at Slovak clubs Pohronie and Železiarne Podbrezová.

On 18 January 2021, Zachara signed a contract lasting until the end of the 2020–21 season with Bosnian Premier League club Široki Brijeg. He debuted in a league game against Olimpik on 21 March 2021. Zachara scored his first goal for Široki Brijeg on 11 April 2021, in a league game against Krupa. He left Široki Brijeg after his contract with the club expired in June 2021.

== International career ==
Zachara made two appearances for the Poland national team in 2014, appearing in January friendlies against Norway and Moldova.

== Honours ==
Raków Częstochowa

- I liga: 2018–19

Szombierki Bytom

- V liga Silesia I: 2024–25
- Polish Cup (Bytom regionals): 2024–25
