= Wojciech Słomka =

Polish footballer (born 1998)

Personal information
- Full name: Wojciech Słomka
- Date of birth: 4 November 1998 (age 28)
- Place of birth: Brzesko, Poland
- Height: 1.81 m (5 ft 11 1/2 in)
- Position: Winger

Team information
- Current team: Podbeskidzie Bielsko-Biała
- Number: 98

Youth career
- 2009–2010: Okocimski KS Brzesko
- 2010–2013: MOSiR Bochnia
- 2013–2014: Cracovia
- 2015–2017: Progres Kraków

Senior career*
Years	Team	Apps	(Gls)
2017–2019	Wisła Kraków	6	(0)
2017–2018	→ GKS Katowice (loan)	18	(1)
2019–2021	Zagłębie Sosnowiec	17	(0)
2020–2021	→ Skra Częstochowa (loan)	3	(0)
2021–2023	Garbarnia Kraków	53	(7)
2023–2024	Radunia Stężyca	21	(3)
2024–2025	Hutnik Kraków	39	(4)
2025–	Podbeskidzie Bielsko-Biała	23	(1)
- * Club domestic league appearances and goals as of 14:45, 6 June 2026 (UTC)

Wojciech Słomka (born 4 November 1998) is a Polish professional footballer who plays as a midfielder for I liga club Podbeskidzie Bielsko-Biała.

== Club career ==
On 4 September 2020, he joined II liga club Skra Częstochowa on loan.
