= Yannick Kakoko =

German footballer

Personal information
- Date of birth: 26 January 1990 (age 36)
- Place of birth: Saarbrücken, West Germany
- Height: 1.74 m (5 ft 9 in)
- Position: Midfielder

Youth career
- ESV Saarbrücken
- –2004: 1. FC Saarbrücken
- 2004: Metz
- 2004–2009: Bayern Munich

Senior career*
Years	Team	Apps	(Gls)
2009	Bayern Munich II	3	(0)
2009–2010	Greuther Fürth	1	(0)
2009–2010	Greuther Fürth II	31	(14)
2010–2011	VfR Aalen	5	(0)
2011	SV Wehen Wiesbaden II	13	(2)
2011–2012	Waldhof Mannheim	8	(1)
2012–2013	FC Homburg	27	(5)
2013–2014	FC Wohlen	29	(4)
2014–2016	Miedź Legnica	40	(3)
2016–2018	Arka Gdynia	51	(4)
2018–2019	F91 Dudelange	3	(0)
2019–2021	Titus Pétange	32	(0)
Total		243	(33)

International career
2007	Germany U-17	0	(0)
- * Club domestic league appearances and goals

Yannick Kakoko (born 26 January 1990) is a German former professional footballer who played as a midfielder.

== Career ==
Born in Saarbrücken, Kakoko began his career with ESV Saarbrücken and later 1. FC Saarbrücken. He left Saarbrücken in summer 2004, joining FC Metz, but returned to Germany after two years, joining Bayern Munich a youth contract. He made his debut in a 3. Liga match against VfR Aalen in March 2009, but had to be substituted due to injury. He left Bayern Munich II in July 2009 and signed his first professional contract with SpVgg Greuther Fürth. After one year in the Greuther Fürth reserve team, he signed a contract for VfR Aalen on 9 June 2010, but was released by the club six months later. He spent half a season playing for SV Wehen Wiesbaden II before joining SV Waldhof Mannheim in July 2011. A year later he signed for FC Homburg.

Kakoko joined Union Titus Pétange ahead of the 2019–20 season on a three-year contract.

He retired at the end of the 2020–21 season.

== International career ==
Kakoko was member of the Germany U-17 at the 2007 FIFA U-17 World Cup in South Korea.

== Personal life ==
Kakoko's father, Etepe, was also a footballer, representing Zaire (as the DR Congo was then known) at the 1974 World Cup. He also played for VfB Stuttgart, and later 1. FC Saarbrücken, whom Yannick represented as a youth.

== Honours ==
Arka Gdynia

- Polish Cup: 2016–17
- Polish SuperCup: 2017
