= Iván González (footballer, born 1988) =

Spanish footballer

Personal information
- Full name: Iván González López
- Date of birth: 15 February 1988 (age 38)
- Place of birth: Torremolinos, Spain
- Height: 1.84 m (6 ft 0 in)
- Position: Centre-back

Youth career
- 1997–2005: Torremolinos
- 2005–2007: Málaga

Senior career*
Years	Team	Apps	(Gls)
2007–2009	Málaga B	49	(2)
2009–2012	Málaga	29	(1)
2011–2012	→ Real Madrid B (loan)	21	(1)
2012–2013	Real Madrid B	29	(1)
2013–2014	Erzgebirge Aue	15	(0)
2015–2016	ASA Târgu Mureș	39	(1)
2016–2017	Alcorcón	8	(0)
2017–2018	Wisła Kraków	29	(1)
2018–2020	Recreativo	32	(2)
Total		251	(9)

International career
2010	Spain U21	1	(0)
- * Club domestic league appearances and goals

Iván González López (born 15 February 1988) is a Spanish former professional footballer who played mainly as a central defender.

== Club career ==
=== Málaga ===
Born in Torremolinos, Province of Málaga, González finished his football development at local Málaga CF, and made his first-team – and La Liga – debut on 22 November 2009, at home against Real Zaragoza, making an immediate impact as he rescued the Andalusians from defeat by scoring with his head in the 74th minute, in a 1–1 draw.

From then onwards, González became a defensive mainstay in Juan Ramón López Muñiz's side, soon attracting interest from the likes of Real Madrid, Atlético Madrid, Liverpool and Hull City.

=== Castilla ===
After the arrival of manager Manuel Pellegrini, González appeared more as a defensive midfielder than in his natural position, but was also deemed surplus to requirements in December 2010 alongside five other players – he eventually stayed at the club. However, on 28 January 2011, he was loaned to Real Madrid Castilla of Segunda División B for the rest of the season and the following, making his official debut on 6 February in a 2–0 win at Pontevedra CF.

On 11 September 2011, in a match against Coruxo FC, Iván scored his first goal for Castilla, also being sent off in the 1–1 away draw. He again received his marching orders on 16 October, now in a 1–0 away loss to Rayo Vallecano B.

González returned to Málaga after his loan stint, but his remaining one-year contract was terminated and again signed with Castilla.

=== Erzgebirge Aue ===
On 20 September 2013, González joined German 2. Bundesliga club FC Erzgebirge Aue, signing a two-year deal and being given the number 32 shirt. On 30 September 2014, his contract was terminated by mutual consent.

=== Later career ===
González moved clubs and countries again in February 2015, signing with ASA Târgu Mureș in Romania. In late June 2016, he agreed to a two-year contract at AD Alcorcón, but left the following 4 January by mutual consent.

On 11 January 2017, González switched to the Ekstraklasa with Wisła Kraków. On 8 August, he scored twice through penalties to help the hosts defeat Wisła Płock 2–1 in the round of 32 of the Polish Cup. In May 2018, it was announced he would be leaving at the end of the next month.

On 17 July 2018, González joined Recreativo de Huelva. In May 2020, he retired at the age of 32 due to injury problems.

== International career ==
On 6 August 2010, González was called up by coach Luis Milla to the Spain under-21 team, for a 2011 UEFA European Championship qualifier against Finland. Four months earlier, he had already been summoned by the previous manager Juan Ramón López Caro, but eventually did not make his debut.

== Honours ==
Real Madrid Castilla

- Segunda División B: 2011–12
