= Jacek Kiełb =

Polish footballer (born 1988)

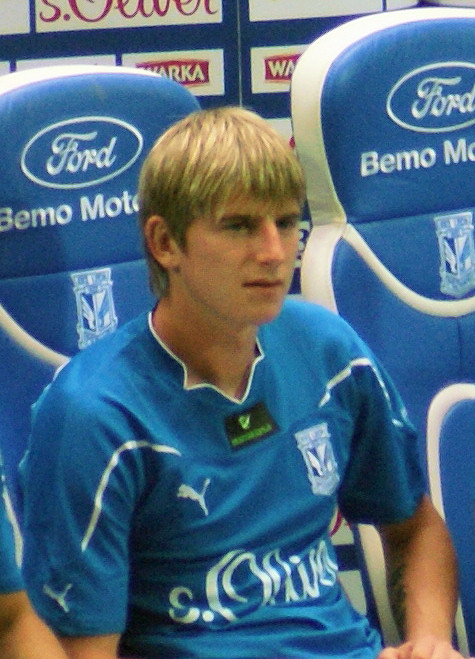
- Kiełb in 2010

Personal information
- Date of birth: 10 January 1988 (age 38)
- Place of birth: Siedlce, Poland
- Height: 1.83 m (6 ft 0 in)
- Position: Midfielder

Team information
- Current team: Orlęta Kielce
- Number: 10

Youth career
- 1994–2004: Pogoń Siedlce

Senior career*
Years	Team	Apps	(Gls)
2004–2005	Pogoń Siedlce		
2005–2010	Korona Kielce	61	(10)
2010–2013	Lech Poznań	19	(1)
2011–2012	→ Korona Kielce (loan)	19	(3)
2012–2013	→ Polonia Warsaw (loan)	15	(3)
2013–2015	Korona Kielce	62	(16)
2015–2016	Śląsk Wrocław	25	(2)
2016–2018	Korona Kielce	52	(16)
2018–2020	Termalica Nieciecza	41	(5)
2020–2023	Korona Kielce	79	(8)
2024–	Orlęta Kielce	58	(13)

International career
2006	Poland U18	2	(1)
2009–2010	Poland U21	3	(3)
2010	Poland	2	(0)
- * Club domestic league appearances and goals as of 21:06, 30 June 2026 (UTC)

Jacek Kiełb (born 10 January 1988) is a Polish footballer who plays as a midfielder for IV liga Świętokrzyskie club Orlęta Kielce. From 2023 to 2024, he was the assistant manager of his former club Korona Kielce.

== Career ==
Born in Siedlce, Kiełb began his career 2004 with Pogoń Siedlce and joined 2005 in the youth team of Korona Kielce, who made one year later his professional debut in the Ekstraklasa.

On 10 June 2010, Lech Poznań announced the signing of Kiełb on a four-year deal. In August 2011, he was loaned back to Korona for a year.

== Career statistics ==
=== Club ===
As of match played 13 June 2026

Appearances and goals by club, season and competition
Club	Season	League			Polish Cup		Europe		Other		Total	
Club	Season	Division	Apps	Goals	Apps	Goals	Apps	Goals	Apps	Goals	Apps	Goals
Korona Kielce	2005–06	Ekstraklasa	1	0	0	0	—		—		1	0
Korona Kielce	2006–07	Ekstraklasa	3	0	0	0	—		3 (Note: Appearances in Ekstraklasa Cup)	0	6	0
Korona Kielce	2007–08	Ekstraklasa	0	0	0	0	—		5	0	5	0
Korona Kielce	2008–09	I liga	31	7	0	0	—		—		31	7
Korona Kielce	2009–10	Ekstraklasa	26	3	4	2	—		—		30	5
Korona Kielce	Total		61	10	4	2	—		8	0	73	12
Lech Poznań	2010–11	Ekstraklasa	19	1	4	0	9 (Note: Three appearances in UEFA Champions League, six appearances in UEFA Europa League)	0	0	0	32	1
Lech Poznań	2011–12	Ekstraklasa	0	0	0	0	—		—		0	0
Lech Poznań	2012–13	Ekstraklasa	0	0	0	0	2 (Note: Appearances in UEFA Europa League)	0	—		2	0
Lech Poznań	Total		19	1	4	0	11	0	0	0	34	1
Korona Kielce (loan)	2011–12	Ekstraklasa	19	3	1	0	—		—		20	3
Polonia Warsaw (loan)	2012–13	Ekstraklasa	15	3	0	0	—		—		15	3
Korona Kielce	2013–14	Ekstraklasa	28	7	0	0	—		—		28	7
Korona Kielce	2014–15	Ekstraklasa	34	9	0	0	—		—		34	9
Korona Kielce	Total		62	16	0	0	—		—		62	16
Śląsk Wrocław	2015–16	Ekstraklasa	25	2	3	0	4	2	—		32	4
Korona Kielce	2016–17	Ekstraklasa	29	10	0	0	—		—		29	10
Korona Kielce	2017–18	Ekstraklasa	23	6	2	0	—		—		25	6
Korona Kielce	Total		52	16	2	0	—		—		54	16
Bruk-Bet Termalica	2018–19	I liga	27	3	3	0	—		—		30	3
Bruk-Bet Termalica	2019–20	I liga	14	2	0	0	—		—		14	2
Bruk-Bet Termalica	Total		41	5	3	0	—		—		44	5
Korona Kielce	2019–20	Ekstraklasa	14	1	—		—		—		14	1
Korona Kielce	2020–21	I liga	29	5	2	0	—		—		31	5
Korona Kielce	2021–22	I liga	15	2	0	0	—		—		15	2
Korona Kielce	2022–23	Ekstraklasa	21	0	2	1	—		—		23	1
Korona Kielce	Total		79	8	4	1	—		—		83	9
Orlęta Kielce	2024–25	IV liga Świętokrzyskie	30	7	—		—		—		30	7
Orlęta Kielce	2025–26	IV liga Świętokrzyskie	28	6	—		—		—		28	6
Orlęta Kielce	Total		58	13	—		—		—		58	13
Career total			417	73	21	3	15	2	8	0	461	78

=== International ===
Appearances and goals by national team and year
National team	Year	Apps	Goals
Poland
Poland	2010	2	0
Total		2	0
