= Ever Valencia =

Colombian footballer (born 1997)

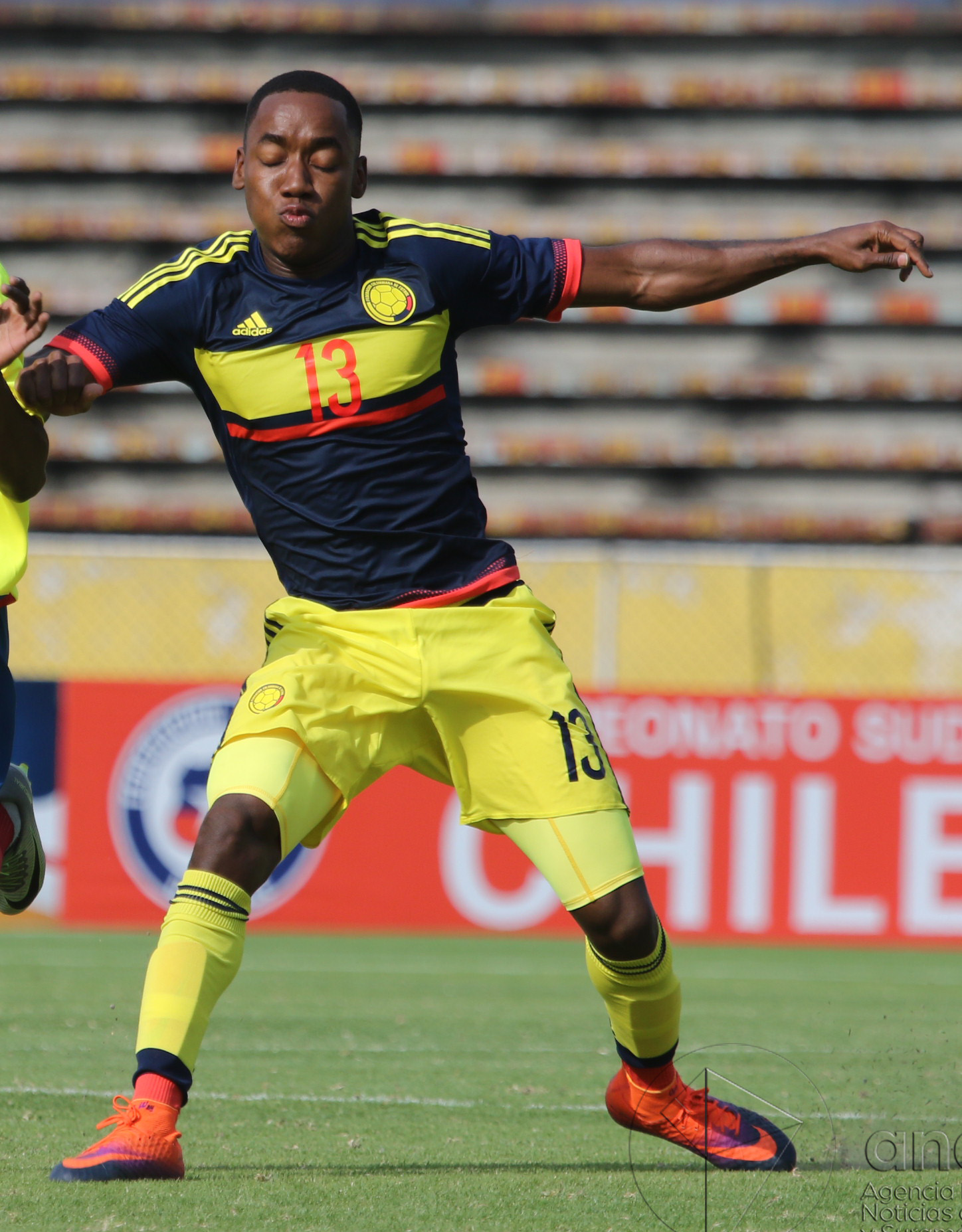

Personal information
- Full name: Ever Augusto Valencia Ruiz
- Date of birth: 23 January 1997 (age 29)
- Place of birth: Villavicencio, Colombia
- Height: 1.75 m (5 ft 9 in)
- Position: Attacking midfielder

Team information
- Current team: Deportes Tolima
- Number: 8

Senior career*
Years	Team	Apps	(Gls)
2015–2023	Independiente Medellín	55	(2)
2017	→ Wisła Kraków (loan)	2	(0)
2019	→ Cúcuta Deportivo (loan)	15	(1)
2020	→ Atlético Bucaramanga (loan)	15	(0)
2021	→ Deportivo Pereira (loan)	36	(1)
2022	→ Envigado (loan)	20	(1)
2024–	América	25	(1)
2024–	Deportes Tolima	12	(1)

International career
2017	Colombia U20	8	(3)
- * Club domestic league appearances and goals as of 16 May 2025

Ever Augusto Valencia Ruiz (born 23 January 1997) is a Colombian professional footballer who plays as an attacking midfielder for Deportes Tolima.
