= IV liga Kuyavia-Pomerania =

Part of the Polish IV liga football division

IV Liga Kuyavia-Pomerania
- Organising body: Kuyavian-Pomeranian Football Association
- Founded: 2000; 26 years ago
- Country: Poland
- Number of clubs: 18
- Level on pyramid: 5
- Promotion to: III liga, group I
- Relegation to: Liga okręgowa
- Current champions: Chemik Bydgoszcz (2nd title) (2025–26)
- Most championships: Elana Toruń (4 titles)
- Sponsor(s): Unisport

IV liga Kuyavia-Pomerania group (grupa kujawsko-pomorska), also known as Unisport IV liga K-PZPN for sponsorship reasons, is one of the groups of IV liga, the fifth level of Polish football league system. The league inaugurated with the 2000–01 season, after introducing a new administrative division of Poland. Until the end of the 2007–08 season, IV liga was placed at the fourth tier of league system, but this was changed with the formation of the Ekstraklasa as the top-level league in Poland.
The clubs from Kuyavian-Pomeranian Voivodeship compete in this group. The winner of the league is promoted to group II of the III liga. The bottom teams are relegated to the groups of Liga okręgowa from Kuyavian-Pomeranian Voivodeship. These groups are Kuyavia-Pomerania I and Kuyavia-Pomerania II.

== List of champions ==
season	club
2000–01	Polonia Bydgoszcz
2001–02	TKP Toruń
2002–03	Jagiellonka Nieszawa
2003–04	TKP Toruń (2)
2004–05	Zdrój Ciechocinek
2005–06	Victoria Koronowo
2006–07	Kujawiak Włocławek
2007–08	Zawisza Bydgoszcz
2008–09	Wda Świecie
2009–10	Unia Solec Kujawski
2010–11	Sparta/Unifreeze Brodnica
2011–12	Pogoń Mogilno
2012–13	Włocłavia Włocławek
2013–14	Sparta Brodnica (2)
2014–15	Elana Toruń (3)
2015–16	ROL.KO Konojady
2016–17	Unia Solec Kujawski (2)
2017–18	Chemik Bydgoszcz
2018–19	Unia Janikowo
2019–20	Pomorzanin Toruń
2020–21	Zawisza Bydgoszcz (2)
2021–22	Unia Solec Kujawski (3)
2022–23	Elata Toruń (4)
2023–24	Wda Świecie (2)
2024–25	Tłuchowia Tłuchowo
2025–26	Chemik Bydgoszcz (2)

== Season 2000–01 ==
IV liga is placed at 4th level of Polish football league system until the end of 2007/08 season.
Kuyavia-Pomerania group was created with the following 18 clubs:

- relegated from III liga "Gdańsk-Warszawa" group: TKP Toruń.
- moved from "Bydgoszcz-Elbląg-Toruń" group: Brda Bydgoszcz, Kasztelan Papowo Biskupie, Legia Chełmża, Pomorzanin Toruń, Pomowiec Kijewo Królewskie, Promień Kowalewo Pomorskie, Szubinianka Szubin, Wda Świecie and Zawisza Bydgoszcz.
- moved from "Konin-Płock-Skierniewice-Włocławek" group: Jagiellonka Nieszawa, Lech Rypin, Start Radziejów, Zdrój Ciechocinek and Ziemowit Osięciny.
- promoted from Liga okręgowa: Polonia Bydgoszcz ("Bydgoszcz" group), Unia Wąbrzeźno ("Toruń" group) and Włocłavia Włocławek ("Włocławek" group).

Final table:

Pos	Club	M	P	W	D	L	GF	GA	GD
1	Polonia Bydgoszcz [N]	34	82	26	4	4	84	31	53
2	TKP Toruń [R]	34	74	23	5	6	87	39	48
3	Jagiellonka Nieszawa	34	74	22	8	4	101	33	68
4	Pomorzanin Toruń	34	72	22	6	6	85	34	51
5	Włocłavia Włocławek [N]	34	59	18	5	11	84	59	25
6	Legia Chełmża	34	58	17	7	10	56	44	12
7	Unia Wąbrzeźno [N]	34	55	17	4	13	94	74	20
8	Promień Kowalewo Pomorskie	34	53	16	5	13	64	68	-4
9	Pomowiec Kijewo Królewskie	34	51	15	6	13	59	52	7
10	Start Radziejów	34	49	14	7	13	62	56	6
11	Lech Rypin	34	48	13	9	12	56	52	4
12	Wda Świecie	34	41	11	8	15	40	53	-13
13	Zdrój Ciechocinek	34	40	10	10	14	65	62	3
14	Zawisza Bydgoszcz	34	34	8	10	16	30	46	-16
15	Ziemowit Osięciny	34	24	7	3	24	44	84	-40
16	Szubinianka Szubin	34	22	4	10	20	37	74	-37
17	Kasztelan Papowo Biskupie	34	13	2	7	25	18	85	-67
18	Brda Bydgoszcz	34	10	2	4	28	24	144	-120

== Season 2001–02 ==
New clubs:

- relegated from III liga "Kuyavia/Pomerania-Greater Poland-Pomerania-West Pomerania" group: Mień Lipno (KP Zawisza Bygdoszcz was dissolved).
- promoted from Liga okręgowa: Unia Solec Kujawski and Victoria Koronowo ("Kuyavia-Pomerania I" group) and Kujawiak Włocławek ("Kuyavia-Pomerania II" group).

Final table:

Pos	Club	M	P	W	D	L	GF	GA	GD
1	TKP Toruń	34	72	23	3	8	99	47	52
2	Jagiellonka Nieszawa	34	65	19	8	7	85	41	44
3	Lech Rypin	34	61	19	4	11	51	37	14
4	Włocłavia Włocławek	34	55	16	7	11	58	55	3
5	Legia Chełmża	34	52	15	7	12	59	51	8
6	Victoria Koronowo [N]	34	52	16	4	14	65	72	-7
7	Start Radziejów	34	51	15	6	13	47	55	-8
8	Mień Lipno [R]	34	51	15	6	13	53	43	10
9	Pomowiec Kijewo Królewskie	34	50	14	8	12	51	57	-6
10	Unia Wąbrzeźno	34	49	15	4	15	61	58	3
11	Wda Świecie	34	49	14	7	13	55	53	2
12	Pomorzanin Toruń	34	46	13	7	14	48	48	0
13	Kujawiak Włocławek [N]	34	45	12	9	13	45	48	-3
14	Zawisza/Chemik Bydgoszcz	34	45	13	6	15	54	61	-7
15	Promień Kowalewo Pomorskie	34	39	11	6	17	52	70	-18
16	Zdrój Ciechocinek	34	31	8	7	19	36	66	-30
17	Ziemowit Osięciny	34	30	8	6	20	42	64	-22
18	Unia Solec Kujawski [N]	34	20	5	5	24	51	86	-35

- Zawisza Bydgoszcz merged with Chemik Bydgoszcz before the season to form Zawisza/Chemik Bydgoszcz (reserve team of Chemik/Zawisza Bydgoszcz).

== Season 2002–03 ==
League reduced to 16 teams.
New clubs:

- relegated from III liga "Kuyavia/Pomerania-Greater Poland-Pomerania-West Pomerania" group: Goplania Inowrocław.
- promoted from Liga okręgowa: Wisła Nowe ("Kuyavia-Pomerania I" group) and LTP Lubanie and Pałuczanka Żnin ("Kuyavia-Pomerania II" group).

Final table:

Pos	Club	M	P	W	D	L	GF	GA	GD
1	Jagiellonka Nieszawa	30	59	17	8	5	83	39	44
2	Kujawiak Włocławek	30	56	17	5	8	65	32	33
3	Wisła Nowe [N]	30	53	16	5	9	55	31	24
4	Start Radziejów	30	52	15	7	8	41	31	10
5	Pomowiec Kijewo Królewskie	30	46	13	7	10	41	34	7
6	Pomorzanin Toruń	30	43	12	7	11	50	47	3
7	Włocłavia Włocławek	30	42	13	3	14	50	45	5
8	Wda Świecie	30	42	12	6	12	53	45	8
9	Victoria Koronowo	30	42	13	3	14	49	50	-1
10	Pałuczanka Żnin [N]	30	42	13	3	14	42	42	0
11	Legia Chełmża	30	41	12	5	13	45	51	-6
12	Mień Lipno	30	40	10	10	10	35	34	1
13	Lech Rypin	30	38	11	5	14	43	42	1
14	Goplania Inowrocław [R]	30	37	10	7	13	38	50	-12
15	LTP Lubanie [N]	30	27	7	6	17	36	77	-41
16	Unia Wąbrzeźno	30	15	4	3	23	40	116	-76

- Jagiellonka Nieszawa refused to play in III liga. Eventually the club withdrew also from IV liga after the season.

== Season 2003–04 ==
New clubs:

- relegated from III liga "Kuyavia/Pomerania-Greater Poland-Pomerania-West Pomerania" group: Sparta Brodnica and TKP Toruń.
- promoted from Liga okręgowa: Zawisza/Chemik Bydgoszcz ("Kuyavia-Pomerania I" group), Cuiavia Inowrocław and Zdrój Ciechocinek ("Kuyavia-Pomerania II" group).

Final table:

Pos	Club	M	P	W	D	L	GF	GA	GD
1	TKP Toruń [R]	30	72	23	3	4	85	29	56
2	Zawisza Bydgoszcz [N]	30	61	19	4	7	64	33	31
3	Cuiavia Inowrocław [N]	30	53	15	8	7	55	37	18
4	Zdrój Ciechocinek [N]	30	52	15	7	8	51	31	20
5	Mień Lipno	30	48	14	6	10	43	34	9
6	Lech Rypin	30	45	13	6	11	47	54	-7
7	Legia Chełmża	30	44	13	5	12	36	39	-3
8	Pałuczanka Żnin	30	44	13	5	12	61	52	9
9	Victoria Koronowo	30	38	11	5	14	41	53	-12
10	Wisła Nowe	30	35	9	8	13	31	47	-16
11	Wda Świecie	30	33	8	9	13	30	43	-13
12	Sparta Brodnica [R]	30	33	8	9	13	35	59	-24
13	Włocłavia Włocławek	30	32	6	14	10	38	47	-9
14	Pomorzanin Toruń	30	30	8	6	16	43	51	-8
15	Start Radziejów	30	26	7	5	18	28	53	-25
16	Pomowiec Kijewo Królewskie	30	22	6	4	20	34	60	-26

- The merge between Zawisza Bydgoszcz and Chemik Bydgoszcz was dissolved before the season.
- Zawisza Bydgoszcz lost play-off to play in III liga.

== Season 2004–05 ==
New clubs:

- relegated from III liga "Kuyavia/Pomerania-Greater Poland-Pomerania-West Pomerania" group: None (Polonia Bydgoszcz was relegated to Liga okręgowa).
- promoted from Liga okręgowa: Olimpia Grudziądz ("Kuyavia-Pomerania I" group), Goplania Inowrocław and Sadownik Waganiec ("Kuyavia-Pomerania II" group).

Final table:

Pos	Club	M	P	W	D	L	GF	GA	GD
1	Zdrój Ciechocinek	30	67	20	7	3	60	20	40
2	Cuiavia Inowrocław	30	59	19	2	9	62	37	25
3	Mień Lipno	30	58	17	7	6	52	34	18
4	Victoria Koronowo	30	57	17	6	7	61	24	37
5	Sparta Brodnica	30	49	14	7	9	51	33	18
6	Goplania Inowrocław [N]	30	46	13	7	10	61	49	12
7	Legia Chełmża	30	44	13	5	12	46	53	-7
8	Lech Rypin	30	39	12	3	15	51	55	-4
9	Sadownik Waganiec [N]	30	39	10	9	11	62	60	2
10	Zawisza Bydgoszcz	30	39	12	3	15	54	48	6
11	Włocłavia Włocławek	30	38	11	5	14	52	62	-10
12	Olimpia Grudziądz [N]	30	37	11	4	15	54	66	-12
13	Pałuczanka Żnin	30	31	10	1	19	40	69	-29
14	Pomorzanin Toruń	30	29	7	8	15	31	56	-25
15	Wda Świecie	30	28	7	7	16	33	56	-23
16	Wisła Nowe	30	17	4	5	21	17	65	-48

== Season 2005–06 ==
New clubs:

- relegated from III liga "Kuyavia/Pomerania-Greater Poland-Pomerania-West Pomerania" group: None.
- promoted from Liga okręgowa: Unia Solec Kujawski ("Kuyavia-Pomerania I" group), Pogoń Mogilno and Sparta Janowiec Wielkopolski ("Kuyavia-Pomerania II" group).

Final table:

Pos	Club	M	P	W	D	L	GF	GA	GD
1	Victoria Koronowo	30	69	21	6	3	73	26	47
2	Sparta Brodnica	30	58	18	4	8	55	37	18
3	Mień Lipno	30	55	16	7	7	49	30	19
4	Zawisza Bydgoszcz	30	51	17	6	7	50	24	26
5	Unia Solec Kujawski [N]	30	48	14	6	10	58	48	10
6	Legia Chełmża	30	47	13	8	9	50	45	5
7	Cuiavia Inowrocław	30	43	12	7	11	43	32	11
8	Lech Rypin	30	40	9	13	8	46	50	-4
9	Olimpia Grudziądz	30	39	10	9	11	46	50	-4
10	Pogoń Mogilno [N]	30	38	10	8	12	41	50	-9
11	Włocłavia Włocławek	30	37	11	4	15	42	51	-9
12	Goplania Inowrocław	30	37	10	7	13	45	44	1
13	Sadownik Waganiec	30	33	8	9	13	40	45	-5
14	Sparta Janowiec Wielkopolski [N]	30	28	7	7	16	32	64	-32
15	Pomorzanin Toruń	30	23	5	8	17	40	68	-28
16	Pałuczanka Żnin	30	11	2	5	23	23	69	-46

- Zawisza Bydgoszcz lost 6 points for bribery attempts in two matches.

== Season 2006–07 ==
New clubs:

- relegated from III liga "Kuyavia/Pomerania-Greater Poland-Pomerania-West Pomerania" group: Chemik Bydgoszcz.
- promoted from Liga okręgowa: Pomorzanin Serock ("Kuyavia-Pomerania I" group), Kujawiak Włocławek and Notecianka Pakość ("Kuyavia-Pomerania II" group).

Final table:

Pos	Club	M	P	W	D	L	GF	GA	GD
1	Kujawiak Włocławek [N]	30	68	20	8	2	66	21	45
2	Goplania Inowrocław	30	65	20	5	5	62	26	36
3	Włocłavia Włocławek	30	58	18	4	8	76	40	36
4	Chemik Bydgoszcz [R]	30	49	14	7	9	45	31	14
5	Lech Rypin	30	47	14	5	11	57	40	17
6	Notecianka Pakość [N]	30	46	14	4	12	63	62	1
7	Sadownik Waganiec	30	45	13	6	11	42	42	0
8	Zawisza Bydgoszcz	30	43	12	7	11	41	26	15
9	Unia Solec Kujawski	30	38	11	5	14	34	51	-17
10	Olimpia Grudziądz	30	38	10	8	12	31	49	-18
11	Pogoń Mogilno	30	38	10	8	12	43	46	-3
12	Legia Chełmża	30	38	11	5	14	33	37	-4
13	Sparta Brodnica	30	36	10	6	14	35	42	-7
14	Mień Lipno	30	34	9	7	14	34	38	-4
15	Pomorzanin Serock [N]	30	17	4	5	21	20	71	-51
16	Cuiavia Inowrocław	30	13	3	4	23	23	83	-60

== Season 2007–08 ==
New clubs:

- promoted from Liga okręgowa: Zawisza/Gwiazda Bydgoszcz ("Kuyavia-Pomerania I" group), Kujawiak Kowal and LTP Lubanie ("Kuyavia-Pomerania II" group).

Final table:

Pos	Club	M	P	W	D	L	GF	GA	GD
1	Zawisza Bydgoszcz	30	71	21	8	1	76	13	63
2	Olimpia Grudziądz	30	71	22	5	3	85	21	64
3	Chemik Bydgoszcz	30	62	19	5	6	53	18	35
4	Goplania Inowrocław	30	59	18	5	7	80	32	48
5	Lech Rypin	30	56	17	5	8	65	39	26
6	Legia Chełmża	30	56	16	8	6	44	33	11
7	Włocłavia Włocławek	30	46	13	7	10	54	49	5
8	Mień Lipno	30	46	13	7	10	47	41	6
9	Gwiazda Bydgoszcz [N]	30	42	12	6	12	52	43	9
10	Notecianka Pakość	30	34	10	4	16	54	59	-5
11	LTP Lubanie [N]	30	28	8	4	18	43	68	-25
12	Pogoń Mogilno	30	28	7	7	16	25	55	-30
13	Sparta Brodnica	30	25	7	4	19	26	62	-36
14	Unia Solec Kujawski	30	20	5	5	20	34	90	-56
15	Kujawiak Kowal [N]	30	18	4	6	20	25	81	-56
16	Sadownik Waganiec	30	13	3	4	23	18	77	-59

- Zawisza/Gwiazda Bydgoszcz changed name into Gwiazda Bydgoszcz
- Zawisza Bydgoszcz was promoted to II liga (new third level of Polish football league system) after winning play-off.
- Teams from places 2-8 were promoted to new created III liga but in fact stayed on 4th level (Mień Lipno lost play-off but finally was promoted after withdrawing of Kujawiak Włocławek from playing in new III liga).
- Teams from places 9-15 stayed in IV liga but in fact they were moved to the 5th level.
- Sadownik Waganiec withdrew after the season.

== Season 2008–09 ==
IV liga became the fifth level of Polish football league system due to the formation of Ekstraklasa as the top-level league in Poland.

New clubs:

- promoted from Liga okręgowa: Czarni Nakło nad Notecią, Grom Osie, Promień Kowalewo Pomorskie, Unia Wąbrzeźno and Wda Świecie ("Kuyavia-Pomerania I" group), Dąb Barcin, Sparta Janowiec Wielkopolski, Start Radziejów and Ziemowit Osięciny ("Kuyavia-Pomerania II" group).

Final table:

Pos	Club	M	P	W	D	L	GF	GA	GD
1	Wda Świecie [N]	30	67	21	4	5	103	40	63
2	Notecianka Pakość	30	67	22	1	7	82	40	42
3	Unia Solec Kujawski	30	64	19	7	4	73	37	36
4	Start Radziejów [N]	30	55	17	4	9	64	55	9
5	Dąb Barcin [N]	30	51	15	6	9	72	40	32
6	Promień Kowalewo Pomorskie [N]	30	50	15	5	10	68	58	10
7	Grom Osie [N]	30	49	14	7	9	67	46	21
8	Gwiazda Bydgoszcz	30	45	13	6	11	52	48	4
9	Czarni Nakło nad Notecią [N]	30	43	13	4	13	61	70	-9
10	LTP Lubanie	30	39	12	3	15	63	62	1
11	Unia Wąbrzeźno [N]	30	39	11	6	13	48	54	-6
12	Sparta Brodnica	30	36	10	6	14	53	53	0
13	Ziemowit Osięciny [N]	30	35	10	5	15	55	70	-15
14	Pogoń Mogilno	30	18	4	6	20	39	66	-27
15	Sparta Janowiec Wielkopolski [N]	30	13	3	4	23	39	117	-78
16	Kujawiak Kowal	30	10	2	4	24	19	102	-83

== Season 2009–10 ==
New clubs:

- relegated from III liga "Kuyavia/Pomerania-Greater Poland" group: Chemik Bydgoszcz (Mień Lipno witdhrew from playing in IV liga).
- promoted from Liga okręgowa: Flisak Złotoria and Unifreeze Miesiączkowo ("Kuyavia-Pomerania I" group), Cuiavia Inowrocław and Unia Gniewkow ("Kuyavia-Pomerania II" group).

Final table:

Pos	Club	M	P	W	D	L	GF	GA	GD
1	Unia Solec Kujawski	30	65	20	5	5	68	28	40
2	Chemik Bydgoszcz [R]	30	63	18	9	3	72	21	51
3	Sparta Brodnica	30	56	16	8	6	53	32	21
4	Cuiavia Inowrocław [N]	30	51	15	6	9	55	39	16
5	Unia Wąbrzeźno	30	44	13	5	12	41	43	-2
6	Dąb Barcin	30	42	13	3	14	59	55	4
7	Flisak Złotoria [N]	30	40	9	13	8	50	48	2
8	Start Radziejów	30	38	11	5	14	40	45	-5
9	Unia Gniewkowo [N]	30	38	11	5	14	39	42	-3
10	LTP Lubanie	30	37	10	7	13	50	61	-11
11	Unifreeze Miesiączkowo [N]	30	35	10	5	15	54	56	-2
12	Gwiazda Bydgoszcz	30	34	8	10	12	33	44	-11
13	Grom Osie	30	33	9	6	15	55	60	-5
14	Promień Kowalewo Pomorskie	30	33	9	6	15	38	62	-24
15	Czarni Nakło nad Notecią	30	31	9	4	17	41	79	-38
16	Ziemowit Osięciny	30	29	8	5	17	67	100	-33

- Unifreeze Miesiączkowo withdrew after the season due to the merge with Sparta Brodnica.
- Gwiazda Bydgoszcz withdrew after the season.

== Season 2010–11 ==
New clubs:

- relegated from III liga "Kuyavia/Pomerania-Greater Poland" group: Goplania Inowrocław, Legia Chełmża and Zdrój Ciechocinek.
- promoted from Liga okręgowa: Chełminianka Chełmno and Krajna Sępólno Krajeńskie ("Kuyavia-Pomerania I" group), Noteć Łabiszyn and Pogoń Mogilno ("Kuyavia-Pomerania II" group).

Final table:

Pos	Club	M	P	W	D	L	GF	GA	GD
1	Sparta/Unifreeze Brodnica	30	77	25	2	3	67	17	50
2	Cuiavia Inowrocław	30	77	25	2	3	97	25	72
3	Flisak Złotoria	30	54	15	9	6	50	37	13
4	Pogoń Mogilno [N]	30	50	14	8	8	53	30	23
5	Chełminianka Chełmno [N]	30	46	13	7	10	54	49	5
6	Krajna Sępólno Krajeńskie [N]	30	46	13	7	10	53	36	17
7	Unia Gniewkowo	30	40	11	7	12	36	43	-7
8	Grom Osie	30	39	12	3	15	53	53	0
9	Legia Chełmża [R]	30	38	11	5	14	40	52	-12
10	Start Radziejów	30	37	10	7	13	43	53	-10
11	Noteć Łabiszyn [N]	30	35	10	5	15	53	80	-27
12	LTP Lubanie	30	32	8	8	14	49	62	-13
13	Dąb Barcin	30	32	8	8	14	44	62	-18
14	Zdrój Ciechocinek [R]	30	27	7	6	17	47	71	-24
15	Goplania Inowrocław [R]	30	26	7	5	18	28	54	-26
16	Unia Wąbrzeźno	30	16	3	7	20	36	79	-43

- Sparta Brodnica merged with Unifreeze Miesiączkowo before the season to form Sparta/Unifreeze Brodnica.

== Season 2011–12 ==
New clubs:

- relegated from III liga "Kuyavia/Pomerania-Greater Poland" group: Unia Solec Kujawski and Włocłavia Włocławek.
- promoted from Liga okręgowa: Pomorzanin Toruń and Start Warlubie ("Kuyavia-Pomerania I" group), Gopło Kruszwica and Szubinianka Szubin ("Kuyavia-Pomerania II" group).

Final table:

Pos	Club	M	P	W	D	L	GF	GA	GD
1	Pogoń Mogilno	30	72	22	6	2	82	24	58
2	Unia Solec Kujawski [R]	30	67	20	7	3	64	25	39
3	Flisak Złotoria	30	61	19	4	7	57	29	28
4	Włocłavia Włocławek [R]	30	59	17	8	5	58	24	34
5	Start Warlubie [N]	30	57	17	6	7	66	24	42
6	Grom Osie	30	49	14	7	9	61	38	23
7	Pomorzanin Toruń [N]	30	41	12	5	13	46	53	-7
8	Gopło Kruszwica [N]	30	40	11	7	12	46	47	-1
9	Szubinianka Szubin [N]	30	39	13	0	17	36	62	-26
10	Noteć Łabiszyn	30	35	11	2	17	43	75	-32
11	Krajna Sępólno Krajeńskie	30	33	9	6	15	50	54	-4
12	Unia Gniewkowo	30	32	9	5	16	40	57	-17
13	Chełminianka Chełmno	30	31	9	4	17	64	66	-2
14	LTP Lubanie	30	24	7	3	20	50	94	-44
15	Legia Chełmża	30	22	6	4	20	26	64	-38
16	Start Radziejów	30	19	5	4	21	28	81	-53

== Season 2012–13 ==
New clubs:

- relegated from III liga "Kuyavia/Pomerania-Greater Poland" group: Sparta Brodnica and Unia Janikowo.
- promoted from Liga okręgowa: Polonia Bydgoszcz and Zawisza II Bydgoszcz ("Kuyavia-Pomerania I" group), Kujawianka Izbica Kujawska and Mień Lipno ("Kuyavia-Pomerania II" group).

Final table:

Pos	Club	M	P	W	D	L	GF	GA	GD
1	Włocłavia Włocławek	30	69	22	3	5	77	31	46
2	Start Warlubie	30	68	21	5	4	88	32	56
3	Grom Osie	30	54	16	6	8	48	28	20
4	Sparta Brodnica [R]	30	53	15	8	7	50	40	10
5	Polonia Bydgoszcz [N]	30	51	14	9	7	63	49	14
6	Kujawianka Izbica Kujawska [N]	30	51	16	3	11	66	52	14
7	Gopło Kruszwica	30	48	15	3	12	62	53	9
8	Szubinianka Szubin	30	45	13	6	11	68	58	10
9	Flisak Złotoria	30	43	13	4	13	51	47	4
10	Krajna Sępólno Krajeńskie	30	41	12	5	13	63	62	1
11	Zawisza II Bydgoszcz [N]	30	39	11	6	13	53	48	5
12	Pomorzanin Toruń	30	39	11	6	13	55	74	-19
13	Mień Lipno [N]	30	27	8	3	19	39	69	-30
14	Noteć Łabiszyn	30	24	7	3	20	40	68	-28
15	Unia Gniewkowo	30	16	4	4	22	36	101	-65
16	Unia Janikowo [R]	30	3	3	4	23	22	69	-47

- Unia Janikowo lost 10 points for corruption charges in 2004/2005 season (in III liga).
- Unia Janikowo withdrew after 18th round.

== Season 2013–14 ==
New clubs:

- relegated from II liga "West" group: Lech Rypin.
- promoted from Liga okręgowa: Chełminianka Chełmno and Promień Kowalewo Pomorskie ("Kuyavia-Pomerania I" group), Piast Złotniki Kujawskie and Zdrój Ciechocinek ("Kuyavia-Pomerania II" group).

Final table:

Pos	Club	M	P	W	D	L	GF	GA	GD
1	Sparta Brodnica	30	79	26	1	3	91	19	72
2	Chełminianka Chełmno [N]	30	65	20	5	5	96	37	59
3	Lech Rypin [R]	30	60	19	3	8	81	35	46
4	Zawisza II Bydgoszcz	30	57	16	9	5	76	35	41
5	Grom Osie	30	51	16	3	11	67	54	13
6	Kujawianka Izbica Kujawska	30	50	15	5	10	68	43	25
7	Polonia Bydgoszcz	30	47	14	5	11	53	45	8
8	Piast Złotniki Kujawskie [N]	30	43	12	7	11	48	48	0
9	Flisak Złotoria	30	38	11	5	14	39	57	-18
10	Gopło Kruszwica	30	38	12	2	16	52	64	-12
11	Promień Kowalewo Pomorskie [N]	30	35	10	5	15	46	53	-7
12	Szubinianka Szubin	30	33	10	3	17	44	80	-36
13	Pomorzanin Toruń	30	33	9	6	15	43	68	-25
14	Zdrój Ciechocinek [N]	30	31	9	4	17	56	76	-20
15	Mień Lipno	30	19	5	4	21	40	97	-57
16	Krajna Sępólno Krajeńskie	30	7	2	1	27	23	112	-89

- Krajna Sępólno Krajeńskie withdrew in mid-season.

== Season 2014–15 ==
New clubs:

- relegated from III liga "Kuyavia/Pomerania-Greater Poland" group: Cuiavia Inowrocław, Elana Toruń and Notecianka Pakość.
- promoted from Liga okręgowa: Olimpia II Grudziądz and ROL.KO Konojady ("Kuyavia-Pomerania I" group), LTP Lubanie and Orlęta Aleksandrów Kujawski ("Kuyavia-Pomerania II" group).

Final table:

Pos	Club	M	P	W	D	L	GF	GA	GD
1	Elana Toruń [R]	30	74	24	2	4	86	19	67
2	Kujawianka Izbica Kujawska	30	55	16	7	7	81	48	33
3	ROL.KO Konojady [N]	30	53	15	8	7	52	36	16
4	Cuiavia Inowrocław [R]	30	53	16	5	9	67	44	23
5	Notecianka Pakość [R]	30	53	16	5	9	66	55	11
6	Grom Osie	30	47	14	5	11	58	41	17
7	Promień Kowalewo Pomorskie	30	44	13	5	12	50	59	-9
8	Lech Rypin	30	43	13	4	13	58	56	2
9	Orlęta Aleksandrów Kujawski [N]	30	43	13	4	13	55	57	-2
10	Zawisza II Bydgoszcz	30	43	13	4	13	63	56	7
11	Piast Złotniki Kujawskie	30	42	12	6	12	41	43	-2
12	LTP Lubanie [N]	30	36	11	3	16	47	64	-17
13	Olimpia II Grudziądz [N]	30	30	9	3	18	62	83	-21
14	Polonia Bydgoszcz	30	27	7	6	17	40	70	-30
15	Flisak Złotoria	30	26	6	8	16	31	62	-31
16	Gopło Kruszwica	30	12	3	3	24	42	106	-64

- Grom Osie withdrew after the season.

== Season 2015–16 ==
New clubs:

- relegated from III liga "Kuyavia/Pomerania-Greater Poland" group: Chełminianka Chełmno, Pogoń Mogilno, Unia Solec Kujawski and Włocłavia Włocławek.
- promoted from Liga okręgowa: Chemik Bydgoszcz and Naprzód Jabłonowo Pomorskie ("Kuyavia-Pomerania I" group), Łokietek Brześć Kujawski and Sadownik Waganiec ("Kuyavia-Pomerania II" group).

Final table:

Pos	Club	M	P	W	D	L	GF	GA	GD
1	ROL.KO Konojady	30	71	23	2	5	80	23	57
2	Chemik Bydgoszcz [N]	30	70	22	4	4	74	23	51
3	Unia Solec Kujawski [R]	30	63	18	9	3	72	29	43
4	Naprzód Jabłonowo Pomorskie [N]	30	52	14	10	6	48	34	14
5	Orlęta Aleksandrów Kujawski	30	51	16	3	11	66	40	26
6	Chełminianka Chełmno [R]	30	50	16	2	12	66	51	15
7	Pogoń Mogilno [R]	30	47	14	5	11	70	41	29
8	Piast Złotniki Kujawskie	30	47	13	8	9	55	42	13
9	Lech Rypin	30	47	14	5	11	65	53	12
10	Zawisza II Bydgoszcz	30	43	13	4	13	51	47	4
11	Cuiavia Inowrocław	30	39	11	6	13	39	44	-5
12	Notecianka Pakość	30	35	10	5	15	65	64	1
13	Łokietek Brześć Kujawski [N]	30	27	8	3	19	48	85	-37
14	Sadownik Waganiec [N]	30	21	5	6	19	30	71	-41
15	Promień Kowalewo Pomorskie	30	11	2	5	23	28	112	-84
16	Włocłavia Włocławek [R]	30	7	2	1	27	17	115	-98

- ROL.KO Konojady refused to play in III liga. Eventually the club withdrew also from IV liga after the season.
- Zawisza II Bydgoszcz withdrew after the season.

== Season 2016–17 ==
League expanded to 18 teams.
New clubs:

- relegated from III liga "Kuyavia/Pomerania-Greater Poland" group: Kujawianka Izbica Kujawska, Sparta Brodnica and Start Warlubie.
- promoted from Liga okręgowa: Legia Chełmża and Wisła Nowe ("Kuyavia-Pomerania I" group), Gopło Kruszwica and Unia Janikowo ("Kuyavia-Pomerania II" group).

Final table:

Pos	Club	M	P	W	D	L	GF	GA	GD
1	Unia Solec Kujawski	34	74	23	5	6	72	26	46
2	Kujawianka Izbica Kujawska [R]	34	73	22	7	5	86	35	51
3	Pogoń Mogilno	34	66	20	6	8	68	32	36
4	Lech Rypin	34	63	19	6	9	81	36	45
5	Start Warlubie [R]	34	60	17	9	8	74	46	28
6	Chełminianka Chełmno	34	58	19	1	14	73	73	0
7	Orlęta Aleksandrów Kujawski	34	58	17	7	10	64	42	22
8	Cuiavia Inowrocław	34	55	16	7	11	64	47	17
9	Legia Chełmża [N]	34	53	15	8	11	46	41	5
10	Sparta Brodnica [R]	34	50	15	5	14	58	45	13
11	Wisła Nowe [N]	34	49	14	7	13	72	52	20
12	Naprzód Jabłonowo Pomorskie	34	46	13	7	14	54	69	-15
13	Unia Janikowo [N]	34	45	11	12	11	58	60	-2
14	Notecianka Pakość	34	35	10	5	19	39	71	-32
15	Łokietek Brześć Kujawski	34	33	9	6	19	60	94	-34
16	Gopło Kruszwica [N]	34	24	7	3	24	40	80	-40
17	Piast Złotniki Kujawskie	34	17	4	5	25	33	98	-65
18	Sadownik Waganiec	34	6	2	0	32	22	117	-95

- Sadownik Waganiec withdrew in mid-season.

== Season 2017–18 ==
New clubs:

- relegated from III liga group 2: Chemik Bydgoszcz.
- promoted from Liga okręgowa: Polonia Bydgoszcz and Sokół Radomin ("Kuyavia-Pomerania I" group), Kujawiak Kowal and Lider Włocławek ("Kuyavia-Pomerania II" group).

Final table:

Pos	Club	M	P	W	D	L	GF	GA	GD
1	Chemik Bydgoszcz [R]	34	74	23	5	6	86	29	57
2	Kujawianka Izbica Kujawska	34	70	21	7	6	97	45	52
3	Polonia Bydgoszcz [N]	34	67	21	4	9	68	52	16
4	Pogoń Mogilno	34	60	19	3	12	78	53	25
5	Sparta Brodnica	34	59	17	8	9	55	40	15
6	Start Warlubie	34	52	15	7	12	58	47	11
7	Lech Rypin	34	52	17	1	16	73	61	12
8	Orlęta Aleksandrów Kujawski	34	50	16	2	16	54	49	5
9	Notecianka Pakość	34	48	14	6	14	64	56	8
10	Cuiavia Inowrocław	34	47	14	5	15	65	62	3
11	Wisła Nowe	34	47	14	5	15	66	71	-5
12	Chełminianka Chełmno	34	45	13	6	15	61	70	-9
13	Unia Janikowo	34	45	13	6	15	67	65	2
14	Legia Chełmża	34	44	13	5	16	35	53	-18
15	Kujawiak Kowal [N]	34	38	11	5	18	54	73	-19
16	Lider Włocławek [N]	34	36	11	3	20	63	87	-24
17	Sokół Radomin [N]	34	29	7	8	19	38	71	-33
18	Naprzód Jabłonowo Pomorskie	34	11	3	2	29	33	131	-98

- Start Warlubie withdrew after the season.

== Season 2018–19 ==
New clubs:

- relegated from III liga group 2: Unia Solec Kujawski.
- promoted from Liga okręgowa: BKS Bydgoszcz and Pomorzanin Toruń ("Kuyavia-Pomerania I" group), Unia Gniewkowo and Włocłavia Włocławek ("Kuyavia-Pomerania II" group).

Final table:

Pos	Club	M	P	W	D	L	GF	GA	GD
1	Unia Janikowo	34	71	21	8	5	76	30	46
2	Orlęta Aleksandrów Kujawski	34	65	19	8	7	70	38	32
3	Sparta Brodnica	34	63	18	9	7	54	36	18
4	Pogoń Mogilno	34	55	14	13	7	65	55	10
5	Cuiavia Inowrocław	34	51	15	6	13	67	56	11
6	Unia Gniewkowo [N]	34	51	14	9	11	46	51	-5
7	Kujawianka Izbica Kujawska	34	50	13	11	10	50	54	-4
8	Lech Rypin	34	50	14	8	12	72	54	18
9	Legia Chełmża	34	47	13	8	13	58	50	8
10	Włocłavia Włocławek [N]	34	47	13	8	13	53	58	-5
11	Notecianka Pakość	34	47	13	8	13	52	55	-3
12	Chełminianka Chełmno	34	45	14	3	17	57	74	-17
13	BKS Bydgoszcz [N]	34	45	13	6	15	56	55	1
14	Pomorzanin Toruń [N]	34	41	10	11	13	50	48	2
15	Polonia Bydgoszcz	34	38	11	5	18	58	64	-6
16	Kujawiak Kowal	34	33	9	6	19	51	82	-31
17	Wisła Nowe	34	26	5	11	18	49	77	-28
18	Unia Solec Kujawski [R]	34	21	5	6	23	29	76	-47

== Season 2019–20 ==
New clubs:

- relegated from III liga group 2: Chemik Bydgoszcz.
- promoted from Liga okręgowa: Sportis Łochowo and Zawisza Bydgoszcz ("Kuyavia-Pomerania I" group), Lider Włocławek and Piast Złotniki Kujawskie ("Kuyavia-Pomerania II" group).

Final table (due to COVID-19 pandemic league was ended after 17th round):

Pos	Club	M	P	W	D	L	GF	GA	GD
1	Pomorzanin Toruń	17	39	12	3	2	36	10	26
2	Lider Włocławek [N]	17	35	11	2	4	31	19	12
3	Lech Rypin	17	33	10	3	4	35	14	21
4	Sportis Łochowo [N]	17	32	10	2	5	35	23	12
5	Chemik Bydgoszcz [R]	17	32	10	2	5	37	21	16
6	Sparta Brodnica	17	30	9	3	5	29	16	13
7	Pogoń Mogilno	17	28	8	4	5	33	26	7
8	Kujawianka Izbica Kujawska	17	26	8	2	7	32	42	-10
9	BKS Bydgoszcz	17	23	6	5	6	36	29	7
10	Orlęta Aleksandrów Kujawski	17	23	7	2	8	24	31	-7
11	Włocłavia Włocławek	17	22	7	1	9	29	41	-12
12	Chełminianka Chełmno	17	22	7	1	9	36	37	-1
13	Zawisza Bydgoszcz [N]	17	21	6	3	8	29	23	6
14	Cuiavia Inowrocław	17	21	6	3	8	28	29	-1
15	Unia Gniewkowo	17	19	5	4	8	27	33	-6
16	Notecianka Pakość	17	16	5	1	11	19	33	-14
17	Legia Chełmża	17	10	2	4	11	15	31	-16
18	Piast Złotniki Kujawskie [N]	17	4	1	1	15	12	65	-53

- Notecianka Pakość withdrew after the season.
- Piast Złotniki Kujawskie withdrew after the season.

== Season 2020–21 ==
League expanded to 19 teams.

New clubs:

- promoted from Liga okręgowa: Start Pruszcz and Wda Świecie ("Kuyavia-Pomerania I" group), KS Brzoza and Kujawiak Kowal ("Kuyavia-Pomerania II" group).

Final table:
After the 18th round the clubs were divided into two groups: promotion (teams 1–7) and relegation (8-19).
In the second part of the season: the clubs in promotion group played two matches against each team in this group and the clubs in relegation group played only one match against each team in this group.

Pos	Club	M	P	W	D	L	GF	GA	GD
1	Zawisza Bydgoszcz	30	70	21	7	2	87	29	58
2	Włocłavia Włocławek	30	67	21	4	5	82	24	58
3	Chemik Bydgoszcz	30	58	17	7	6	59	30	29
4	Sportis Łochowo	30	51	15	6	9	62	41	21
5	Kujawianka Izbica Kujawska	30	49	14	7	9	55	49	6
6	Lider Włocławek	30	43	13	4	13	66	58	8
7	Pogoń Mogilno	30	35	10	5	15	46	55	-9
8	Unia Gniewkowo	29	48	14	6	9	52	50	2
9	Wda Świecie	29	47	15	2	12	68	62	6
10	Lech Rypin	29	45	13	6	10	46	48	-2
11	BKS Bydgoszcz	29	42	13	3	13	69	60	9
12	Sparta Brodnica	29	40	11	7	11	47	34	13
13	Chełminianka Chełmno	29	39	12	3	14	48	52	-4
14	Legia Chełmża	29	37	11	4	14	43	50	-7
15	Orlęta Aleksandrów Kujawski	29	35	11	2	16	40	62	-22
16	Start Pruszcz	29	34	10	4	15	50	59	-9
17	Cuiavia Inowrocław	29	32	9	5	15	44	61	-17
18	Kujawiak Kowal	29	19	5	4	20	31	69	-38
19	KS Brzoza	29	3	1	0	28	24	126	-102

- Orlęta Aleksandrów Kujawski won play-off to stay in IV liga.
- Start Pruszcz won play-off to stay in IV liga.
- Legia Chełmża withdrew after the season (so Cuiavia Inowrocław finally kept the place in IV liga).

== Season 2021–22 ==
League reduced to 18 teams.
New clubs:

- relegated from III liga group 2: Pomorzanin Toruń.
- promoted from Liga okręgowa: Unia Solec Kujawski ("Kuyavia-Pomerania I" group) and Notecianka Pakość ("Kuyavia-Pomerania II" group).

Final table:
TBA

== All-time table ==
The table that follows is accurate as of the end of the 2020–21 season. It includes the clubs that played at least one match (even annulled) in IV liga Kuyavia-Pomerania group since 2000/01 season.
Blue colour means that the club plays in IV liga in the current 2021–22 season.
Green colour means that the club plays higher than IV liga in the current 2021–22 season.
Dark grey colour means that the club does not play in any league in the current 2021–22 season.

Pos	Club	S	M	P	W	D	L	GF	GA	GD	county seat	seasons
1	Lech Rypin	16	486	767	227	86	173	927	726	201	Rypin	01-08, 14-
2	Sparta (/Unifreeze) Brodnica	15	448	744	219	87	142	759	565	194	Brodnica	04-11, 13–14, 17-
3	Włocłavia Włocławek	14	419	638	188	74	157	770	701	69	Włocławek	01-08, 12–13, 16, 19-
4	Legia Chełmża	15	456	631	181	88	187	632	694	-62	Toruń	01-08, 11–12, 17-21
5	Cuiavia Inowrocław	13	388	594	176	66	146	709	596	113	Inowrocław	04-07, 10–11, 15-
6	Pogoń Mogilno	12	359	535	152	79	128	643	533	110	Mogilno	06-09, 11–12, 16-
7	Unia Solec Kujawski	10	312	480	140	60	112	555	496	59	Bydgoszcz	02, 06–10, 12, 16–17, 19, 22-
8	Pomorzanin Toruń	11	329	436	121	73	135	527	557	-30	Toruń	01-06, 12–14, 19–20, 22-
9	Zawisza (/Chemik) Bydgoszcz	9	265	435	129	54	82	485	303	182	Bydgoszcz	01-02, 04–08, 20-21
10	Kujawianka Izbica Kujawska	8	239	424	125	49	65	535	368	167	Włocławek	13-15, 17-
11	Chemik Bydgoszcz	7	201	408	123	39	39	426	173	253	Bydgoszcz	07-08, 10, 16, 18, 20-
12	Chełminianka Chełmno	9	268	401	123	32	113	555	509	46	Chełmno	11-12, 14, 16-
13	Notecianka Pakość	9	269	381	114	39	116	504	495	9	Inowrocław	07-09, 15–20, 22-
14	Mień Lipno	9	274	378	107	57	110	392	420	-28	Lipno	02-08, 13-14
15	Start Radziejów	8	248	327	94	45	109	353	429	-76	Radziejów	01-04, 09-12
16	Orlęta Aleksandrów Kujawski	7	208	325	99	28	81	373	319	54	Aleksandrów Kuj.	15-
17	Grom Osie	7	210	322	95	37	78	409	320	89	Świecie	09-15
18	Polonia Bydgoszcz	6	192	312	93	33	66	366	311	55	Bydgoszcz	01, 13–15, 18-19
19	Wda Świecie	7	217	307	88	43	86	382	352	30	Świecie	01-05, 09, 21-
20	Elana (TKP) Toruń	4	128	292	93	13	22	357	134	223	Toruń	01-02, 04, 15
21	Goplania Inowrocław	6	180	270	78	36	66	314	255	59	Inowrocław	03, 05–08, 11
22	Promień Kowalewo Pomorskie	7	218	265	76	37	105	346	482	-136	Golub-Dobrzyń	01-02, 09–10, 14-16
23	Flisak Złotoria	6	180	262	73	43	64	278	280	-2	Toruń	10-15
24	Victoria Koronowo	5	154	258	78	24	52	289	225	64	Bydgoszcz	02-06
25	Zdrój Ciechocinek	6	188	248	69	41	78	315	326	-11	Aleksandrów Kuj.	01-02, 04–05, 11, 14
26	Unia Gniewkowo	7	200	244	68	40	92	276	377	-101	Inowrocław	10-13, 19-
27	Start Warlubie	4	128	237	70	27	31	286	149	137	Świecie	12-13, 17-18
28	Wisła Nowe	6	192	227	62	41	89	290	343	-53	Świecie	03-05, 17-19
29	LTP Lubanie	7	210	223	63	34	113	338	488	-150	Włocławek	03, 08–12, 15
30	Unia Wąbrzeźno	6	188	218	63	29	96	320	424	-104	Wąbrzeźno	01-03, 09-11
31	Jagiellonka Nieszawa	3	98	198	58	24	16	269	113	156	Aleksandrów Kuj.	01-03
32	Olimpia Grudziądz	4	120	185	53	26	41	216	186	30	Grudziądz	05-08
33	Zawisza II Bydgoszcz	4	120	182	53	23	44	243	186	57	Bydgoszcz	13-16
34	Kujawiak Włocławek	3	94	169	49	22	23	176	101	75	Włocławek	02-03, 07
35	Pomowiec Kijewo Królewskie	4	128	169	48	25	55	185	203	-18	Chełmno	01-04
36	Unia Janikowo	4	132	164	48	30	54	223	224	-1	Inowrocław	13, 17-19
37	Gopło Kruszwica	5	154	162	48	18	88	242	350	-108	Inowrocław	12-15, 17
38	Sadownik Waganiec	6	184	157	41	34	109	214	412	-198	Aleksandrów Kuj.	05-08, 16-17
39	Piast Złotniki Kujawskie	5	141	153	42	27	72	189	296	-107	Inowrocław	14-17, 20
40	Szubinianka Szubin	4	124	139	40	19	65	185	274	-89	Nakło	01, 12-14
41	Pałuczanka Żnin	4	120	128	38	14	68	166	232	-66	Żnin	03-06
42	Krajna Sępólno Krajeńskie	4	120	127	36	19	65	189	264	-75	Sepólno Kraj.	11-14
43	Dąb Barcin	3	90	125	36	17	37	175	157	18	Żnin	09-11
44	ROL.KO Konojady	2	60	124	38	10	12	132	59	73	Brodnica	15-16
45	Gwiazda Bydgoszcz	3	90	121	33	22	35	137	135	2	Bydgoszcz	08-10
46	Ziemowit Osięciny	4	128	118	33	19	76	208	318	-110	Radziejów	01-02, 09-10
47	Kujawiak Kowal	5	157	118	31	25	101	180	407	-227	Włocławek	08-09, 18–19, 21
48	Lider Włocławek	3	81	114	35	9	37	160	164	-4	Włocławek	18, 20-
49	BKS Bydgoszcz	3	80	110	32	14	34	161	144	17	Bydgoszcz	19-
50	Naprzód Jabłonowo Pomorskie	3	98	109	30	19	49	135	234	-99	Brodnica	16-18
51	Noteć Łabiszyn	3	90	94	28	10	52	136	223	-87	Żnin	11-13
52	Sportis Łochowo	2	47	83	25	8	14	97	64	33	Bydgoszcz	20-
53	Czarni Nakło nad Notecią	2	60	74	22	8	30	102	149	-47	Nakło	09-10
54	Łokietek Brześć Kujawski	2	64	60	17	9	38	108	179	-71	Włocławek	16-17
55	Sparta Janowiec Wielkopolski	2	60	41	10	11	39	71	181	-110	Żnin	06, 09
56	Unifreeze Miesiączkowo	1	30	35	10	5	15	54	56	-2	Brodnica	10
57	Start Pruszcz	1	29	34	10	4	15	50	59	-9	Świecie	21-
58	Olimpia II Grudziądz	1	30	30	9	3	18	62	83	-21	Grudziadz	15
59	Sokół Radomin	1	34	29	7	8	19	38	71	-33	Golub-Dobrzyń	18
60	Pomorzanin Serock	1	30	17	4	5	21	20	71	-51	Świecie	07
61	Kasztelan Papowo Biskupie	1	34	13	2	7	25	18	85	-67	Chełmno	01
62	Brda Bydgoszcz	1	34	10	2	4	28	24	144	-120	Bydgoszcz	01
63	KS Brzoza	1	29	3	1	0	28	24	126	-102	Bydgoszcz	21

- Zawisza Bydgoszcz lost 6 points for bribery attempts in two matches in 2005/06 season.
- Unia Janikowo lost 10 points in 2012/13 season for corruption charges in 2004/2005 season.

NOTE: County without any club in IV liga: Tuchola.

== Locations of the clubs ==
Locations of all clubs playing in IV liga Kuyavia-Pomerania group:
