= Krzysztof Kretkowski =

Polish footballer

Personal information
- Date of birth: 5 August 1977 (age 49)
- Place of birth: Inowrocław, Poland
- Height: 1.77 m (5 ft 10 in)
- Position: Forward

Senior career*
Years	Team	Apps	(Gls)
1998–2005	Goplania Inowrocław		
1999	→ Elana Toruń (loan)		
2003	→ Gopło Kruszwica (loan)		
2005–2006	Zdrój Ciechocinek		
2006	Unia Janikowo		
2006–2008	Wisła Płock	27	(4)
2008	Aias Salamina		
2008–2009	Unia Janikowo	11	(0)
2009	Lech Rypin	15	(7)
2009	Olimpia Grudziądz	8	(0)
2010	Dąb Barcin		
2010–2013	Cuiavia Inowrocław		
2013–2016	Sparta Brodnica		
2016–2017	FC Emigranci Almere		
- * Club domestic league appearances and goals

Krzysztof Kretkowski (born 5 August 1977) is a Polish former professional footballer who played as a striker.
