= Adam Kardasz =

Polish footballer

Personal information
- Date of birth: 1 November 1983 (age 42)
- Place of birth: Bydgoszcz, Poland
- Height: 1.96 m (6 ft 5 in)
- Position: Midfielder

Senior career*
Years	Team	Apps	(Gls)
2001–2004	Chemik/Zawisza Bydgoszcz		
2004–2005	Chemik Bydgoszcz		
2005–2006	Widzew Łódź	38	(0)
2006	Unia Janikowo	3	(0)
2007–2008	Victoria Koronowo	11	(4)
2008	Pelikan Łowicz	10	(0)
2008–2011	Victoria Koronowo	84	(24)
2011	Chemik Bydgoszcz	13	(4)
2012–2013	Szubinianka Szubin		
2013–2015	Chemik Bydgoszcz		
2016–2018	Polonia Bydgoszcz		
2019	Dąb Potulice	8	(7)
2023	Chemik Bydgoszcz	1	(1)
- * Club domestic league appearances and goals

Adam Kardasz (born 1 November 1983) is a Polish former professional footballer who played as a midfielder, spending the majority of his career in or in the vicinity of his hometown.

== Honours ==
Widzew Łódź

- II liga: 2005–06

Chemik Bydgoszcz

- Regional league Kuyavia–Pomerania I: 2014–15
