= Tomasz Ciesielski =

Polish footballer (born 1979)

Personal information
- Full name: Tomasz Ciesielski
- Date of birth: 2 May 1979 (age 47)
- Place of birth: Inowrocław, Poland
- Height: 1.86 m (6 ft 1 in)
- Position: Defender

Senior career*
Years	Team	Apps	(Gls)
1997–1998	Unia Janikowo		
1998–1999	Elana Toruń		
1999–2003	Polonia Warsaw	66	(1)
2002	→ Widzew Łódź (loan)	12	(0)
2003–2004	Unia Janikowo		
2005	Kujawiak Włocławek	15	(0)
2005	Zawisza Bydgoszcz (2)	2	(0)
2006–2007	Unia Janikowo	27	(0)
2007–2008	Zagłębie Sosnowiec	10	(0)
2008–2010	KSZO Ostrowiec	60	(2)
2010–2013	Dolcan Ząbki	60	(1)
2013	Siarka Tarnobrzeg	12	(0)
2013	Orlicz Suchedniów		
2013–2014	Łysica Bodzentyn	17	(2)
2015–2016	APKK Kielce		
2016	Polonia Białogon		
2018	Unia Janikowo		

International career
2002	Poland	1	(0)
- * Club domestic league appearances and goals

Tomasz Ciesielski (born 2 May 1979) is a Polish former professional footballer who played as a defender.

== Career ==
While playing for Polonia Warsaw early in his career, Cieślewicz won the league and the Polish League Cup with the team in the 1999–00 season. In the next campaign, he helped Polonia win the Polish Cup and Polish Super Cup. On 10 February 2002, he made his debut for the Poland national team in a 2–1 win against Faroe Islands.

== Honours ==
Polonia Warsaw

- Ekstraklasa: 1999–00
- Polish Cup: 2000–01
- Polish League Cup: 1999–00
- Polish Super Cup: 2000

KSZO Ostrowiec

- II liga East: 2008–09
