= Leonid Khankevich =

Belarusian footballer

Personal information
- Date of birth: 21 August 1995 (age 31)
- Place of birth: Smolevichi, Minsk Oblast, Belarus
- Height: 1.88 m (6 ft 2 in)
- Position: Forward

Youth career
- 2011–2012: Torpedo-BelAZ Zhodino

Senior career*
Years	Team	Apps	(Gls)
2012–2016	Smolevichi-STI	95	(14)
2017–2018	Luch Minsk	40	(16)
2018	→ Belshina Bobruisk (loan)	8	(3)
2019	Dnyapro Mogilev	12	(1)
2019	Gorodeya	2	(0)
2020	Smolevichi	14	(3)
2021	Smorgon	9	(0)
2021	Volna Pinsk	12	(0)
2022	Włocłavia Włocławek		
2022–2023	Kujawiak Kowal		
2023	Dynamo Toronto		

International career
2013	Belarus U17	1	(0)
- * Club domestic league appearances and goals as of 31 December 2021

Leonid Khankevich (Belarusian: Леанід Ханкевіч; Russian: Леонид Ханкевич; born 21 August 1995) is a Belarusian footballer who plays as a forward.

== Club career ==
=== Early career ===
Khankevich began his career with his native club in the country's second-tier league, Smolevichi. After four seasons with Smolevichi, he signed with division rival Luch Minsk in 2017. In his debut season in Minsk, he helped the club secure promotion to the premier league by winning the league title. He would finish second in the league's scoring charts with 15 goals.

=== Belarus ===
Despite helping Luch in securing a promotion, he would spend the first half of the 2018 season with Belshina Bobruisk on a loan spell. Following his brief stint with Belshina, he made his premier league debut with his former club Luch for the remainder of the 2018 season. In his debut season in the country's top-tier league, he appeared in 10 matches and scored 1 goal.

In 2019, he signed with league rival Dnyapro Mogilev. His tenure with Mogilev was short-lived as he would conclude the season with Gorodeya. After the conclusion of the season, he left Gorodeya. He returned to his former club Smolevichi for the 2020 season. His final season in the Belarusian first division was with Smorgon in 2021. Midway through the season he left Smorgon and returned to the second division to play with Volna Pinsk.

=== Poland ===
Khankevich was signed by Włocłavia Włocławek in the Polish IV liga in the winter of 2022. After a season in Włocławek, he played with Kujawiak Kowal in the Liga okręgowa.

=== Canada ===
In the summer of 2023, he secured another deal abroad in the Canadian Soccer League with Dynamo Toronto. He would assist the club in finishing fourth in the standings.

== Honors ==
FC Luch Minsk

- Belarusian First League: 2017
