= Marcin Tarnowski =

Polish footballer

Personal information
- Full name: Marcin Tarnowski
- Date of birth: 6 February 1985 (age 41)
- Place of birth: Mogilno, Poland
- Height: 1.79 m (5 ft 10 1/2 in)
- Position: Forward

Team information
- Current team: Pałuczanka Żnin
- Number: 5

Youth career
- –2000: Unia Janikowo

Senior career*
Years	Team	Apps	(Gls)
2000–2001	Unia Janikowo		
2002–2005	Amica Wronki	6	(0)
2006	→ Zawisza Bydgoszcz (loan)	17	(1)
2006	Amica Wronki		
2006	Jagiellonia Białystok	2	(0)
2007–2008	→ Unia Janikowo (loan)	45	(9)
2009–2011	Zawisza Bydgoszcz	58	(5)
2011	Chojniczanka Chojnice	17	(1)
2012	Lech Rypin	16	(3)
2013–2016	Wigry Suwałki	73	(2)
2016–2017	SV Petersdorf	13	(6)
2017	Elana Toruń	6	(0)
2017–2018	Dąb Barcin		
2018–2023	BOSiR Barcin		
2024–	Pałuczanka Żnin	8	(0)

International career
2002	Poland U17	1	(1)
2004	Poland U19	3	(0)
- Poland U21
- * Club domestic league appearances and goals as of 16:47, 24 June 2025 (UTC)

Marcin Tarnowski (born 6 February 1985) is a Polish footballer who plays as a forward for regional league club Pałuczanka Żnin.

== Career ==
Tarnowski was born in Mogilno. His career began in Unia Janikowo. In 2002, he moved to Amica Wronki and spent most of his time there playing for the reserve team. In 2007, he became a player of Jagiellonia Białystok, but he played only two matches there. In 2009 Tarnowski was transferred to Zawisza Bydgoszcz. In 2011, he joined Chojniczanka Chojnice.

Tarnowski represented Poland during the 2002 UEFA European Under-17 Championship and 2004 UEFA European Under-19 Championship.

== Honours ==
Lech Rypin

- III liga Kuyavian-Pomeranian–Greater Poland: 2011–12

BOSiR Barcin

- Klasa A Bydgoszcz II: 2018–19

Pałuczanka Żnin

- Klasa A Bydgoszcz II: 2023–24
