= Oskar Kubiak =

Polish footballer (born 2006)

- Kubiak in 2026 with Slavia Prague

Personal information
- Date of birth: 25 September 2006 (age 20)
- Place of birth: Inowrocław, Poland
- Height: 1.73 m (5 ft 8 in)
- Position: Winger

Team information
- Current team: Slavia Prague
- Number: 8

Youth career
- –2018: Gopło Kruszwica
- 2018–2022: Wda Świecie

Senior career*
Years	Team	Apps	(Gls)
2022–2025	Wda Świecie	86	(9)
2025–2026	Arka Gdynia	14	(3)
2025–2026	→ Sokół Kleczew (loan)	18	(14)
2026–	Slavia Prague	6	(0)

International career^{‡}
2026–	Poland U20	2	(0)
2026–	Poland	2	(0)
- * Club domestic league appearances and goals as of 13:43, 10 November 2026 (UTC) ‡ National team caps and goals as of 17 November 2026

Oskar Kubiak (born 25 September 2006) is a Polish professional footballer who plays as a winger for Czech First League club Slavia Prague and the Poland national team.

== Early life ==
Kubiak was born on 25 September 2006. Born in Poland, he is a native of Kruszwica, Poland.

== Club career ==
As a youth player, Kubiak joined the youth teams of Polish side Gopło Kruszwica. Following his stint there, he moved to Wda Świecie in 2018 and was promoted to the club's senior team in 2022, where he made 86 appearances and scored nine goals in the fourth and fifth tiers.

On 26 June 2025, Kubiak signed a three-year contract with Ekstraklasa club Arka Gdynia. Soon after, he was sent on loan to II liga side Sokół Kleczew, where he scored 14 goals in 18 appearances. After returning to Arka in January 2026, he made 14 top-flight appearances and scored three goals.

On 25 June 2026, Kubiak signed a contract with Czech side Slavia Prague, keeping him at the club until June 2030.

== International career ==
Kubiak is a Poland youth international. During the spring of 2026, he played for the Poland under-20 team in the Under 20 Elite League.

In November 2026, Kubiak received his first call-up to the Poland senior team for the UEFA Nations League games against Romania and Sweden. He made his debut as a starter in a 2–1 loss to Romania on 14 November.

== Style of play ==
Kubiak plays as a winger. Polish news website iGol.pl wrote in 2026 that he "can play both on the left wing and on both wings... can be a responsible defender... dribbling, strength, speed, and a atomic shot – all of these things are in... [his] arsenal".

== Career statistics ==
As of match played 8 November 2026

Appearances and goals by club, season and competition
Club	Season	League			National cup (Note: Includes Czech Cup)		Europe		Total	
Club	Season	Division	Apps	Goals	Apps	Goals	Apps	Goals	Apps	Goals
Wda Świecie	2022–23	IV liga Kuyavia-Pomerania	29	1	—		—		29	1
Wda Świecie	2023–24	IV liga Kuyavia-Pomerania	32	4	—		—		32	4
Wda Świecie	2024–25	III liga, group II	25	4	—		—		25	4
Wda Świecie	Total		86	9	—		—		86	9
Arka Gdynia	2025–26	Ekstraklasa	14	3	—		—		14	3
Sokół Kleczew (loan)	2025–26	II liga	18	14	—		—		18	14
Slavia Prague	2026–27	Czech First League	6	0	2	0	4 (Note: Appearances in UEFA Champions League)	0	12	0
Career total			124	26	2	0	4	0	130	26

=== International ===
As of match played 17 November 2026

Appearances and goals by national team and year
National team	Year	Apps	Goals
Poland	2026	2	0
Total		2	0

== Honours ==
Wda Świecie

- IV liga Kuyavia-Pomerania: 2023–24
