= Wojciech Jarmuż =

Polish footballer

Personal information
- Full name: Wojciech Jarmuż
- Date of birth: 5 January 1984 (age 42)
- Place of birth: Słupsk, Poland
- Height: 1.83 m (6 ft 0 in)
- Position: Defender

Team information
- Current team: Jantar Ustka
- Number: 8

Youth career
- Jantar Ustka

Senior career*
Years	Team	Apps	(Gls)
2002–2004	Jantar Ustka		
2004	Wisła Płock	0	(0)
2005	Unia Janikowo		
2006	Zdrój Ciechocinek		
2006	Unia Janikowo	13	(0)
2007–2010	Widzew Łódź	32	(0)
2010	Flota Świnoujście	8	(0)
2010–2012	GKS Bełchatów	4	(0)
2012	Pomorze Potęgowo		
2020	Jantar Ustka	1	(0)
2024–	Jantar Ustka	5	(0)
- * Club domestic league appearances and goals as of 24 October 2024

Wojciech Jarmuż (born 5 January 1984) is a Polish footballer who plays as a defender for Jantar Ustka.

== Honours ==
Widzew Łódź

- I liga: 2008–09
