= Michał Jakóbowski =

Polish footballer

Personal information
- Full name: Michał Jakóbowski
- Date of birth: 8 September 1992 (age 34)
- Place of birth: Radziejów, Poland
- Height: 1.70 m (5 ft 7 in)
- Position: Left winger

Youth career
- Start Radziejów
- Kujawiak Włocławek
- 2007–2011: Lech Poznań

Senior career*
Years	Team	Apps	(Gls)
2012–2014	Lech Poznań II	32	(9)
2012–2013	→ Warta Poznań (loan)	40	(2)
2013	Lech Poznań	3	(0)
2014–2016	Bytovia Bytów	48	(6)
2016–2017	Chojniczanka Chojnice	23	(2)
2017–2019	Bytovia Bytów	52	(9)
2019–2023	Warta Poznań	86	(9)
2023	Chojniczanka Chojnice	7	(0)
2023–2024	Polonia Środa Wielkopolska	4	(0)
2024–2025	Noteć Czarnków	2	(0)
- * Club domestic league appearances and goals as of 18:27, 18 June 2025 (UTC)

Michał Jakóbowski (born 8 September 1992) is a Polish professional footballer who plays as a left winger.
