= Chemik Bydgoszcz =

Chemik Bydgoszcz may refer to:

- Chemik Bydgoszcz (football), a Polish association football club
- Chemik Bydgoszcz (volleyball), a Polish professional volleyball team
- Chemik / Zawisza Bydgoszcz, a defunct Polish association football club created by a merger
- Chemik Bydgoszcz (sports club)
