= Andrzej Magowski =

Polish footballer (1966–2022)

Personal information
- Date of birth: 7 July 1966
- Place of birth: Bydgoszcz, Poland
- Date of death: 28 October 2022 (aged 56)
- Place of death: Bydgoszcz, Poland
- Height: 1.82 m (6 ft 0 in)
- Position: Midfielder

Senior career*
Years	Team	Apps	(Gls)
–1985	BKS Bydgoszcz		
1985–1989	Polonia Bydgoszcz		
1989–1990	Elana Toruń		
1990–1992	Olimpia Poznań	43	(0)
1993	Igloopol Dębica	14	(1)
1993–1994	Olimpia Poznań	25	(3)
1994–1995	Warta Poznań	26	(4)
1995	Olimpia Poznań	5	(0)
1995	Olimpia-Lechia Gdańsk	1	(0)
1995–1997	VfL Herzlake	41	(11)
1997–1998	VfL Osnabrück	3	(0)
1998–1999	VfL Herzlake	26	(5)
1999–2000	Pomerania Police		

Managerial career
- 2001: Mień Lipno
- 2002: Start Radziejów
- 2002–2003: Pomowiec Kijewo
- 2004–2007: Unia Solec Kujawski
- 2008: Dąb Barcin
- * Club domestic league appearances and goals

Andrzej Magowski (7 July 1966 – 28 October 2022) was a Polish footballer who played as a midfielder.

== Career ==
Magowski started his career in Bydgoszcz with BKS Bydgoszcz. It is not known how long he spent with BKS, but it is known that he moved to Polonia Bydgoszcz in 1985, aged 19. After four seasons with Polonia, Magowski joined Elana Toruń for a season, before securing a transfer to I liga side Olimpia Poznań.

During his first spell with Olimpia, he made a total of 43 top flight appearances for the club over two and a half seasons. Over the winter break he joined struggling Igloopol Dębica, but was unable to help them, being relegated in his 14 appearances for the club. As a result, Magowski was relegated with both teams he played for during the 1992–93 season, Olimpia from the I liga and Igloopol from the II liga. Magowski returned to Olimpia over the summer and spent the following season with Olimpia in the II liga, making a further 25 appearances for the club and scored 3 goals as Olimpia went on to win the league.

Despite being promoted the previous season with Olimpia, Magowski joined city rivals Warta Poznań for the start of the 1994–95 season. As the season progressed it was clear that Magowski was going to have another relegation on his record, and opted to rejoin Olimpia towards the end of the season. He made 26 appearances for Warta, and a further 5 for Olimpia that season, with Warta finishing bottom of the I liga. At the start of the 1995–96 season Olimpia Poznań were involved in a merger with Lechia Gdańsk creating the Olimpia-Lechia Gdańsk team, and with the team playing in the city of Gdańsk. Magowski made one appearance for Olimpia-Lechia before opting to move to Germany for the next four seasons.

Magowski initially joined VfL Herzlake in Germany, having an impressive first season, and finishing as the club's top goalscorer with ten goals. Despite the impressive start in Germany for Magowski, he only managed nine appearances the following season, and joined VfL Osnabrück where he struggled even more, making only three appearances the whole season. He returned to VfL Herzlake for one last season, making 26 appearances and scoring 5 goals, to take his total in Germany for the four seasons to 70 league appearances and 16 goals. He returned to Poland, playing his final season with Pomerania Police before retiring in 2000. In total he made 75 appearances in Poland's top division scoring 4 goals.

== Post-playing life and death ==
After his playing career he held roles in a managerial position with clubs such as; Start Radziejów, Pomowiec Kijewo, Mień Lipno, Unia Solec Kujawski, and Dąb Barcin. In 2013 he became a coordinator of the Kuyavian-Pomeranian Football Association.

Magowski died on 28 October 2022, at the age of 56.

== Honours ==
Olimpia Poznań

- II liga West: 1993–94
