= Željko Mrvaljević =

Montenegrin footballer

Personal information
- Date of birth: 8 April 1981 (age 45)
- Place of birth: Bar, SFR Yugoslavia
- Height: 1.88 m (6 ft 2 in)
- Position: Defender

Youth career
- Mornar

Senior career*
Years	Team	Apps	(Gls)
1997–2001	Budućnost Podgorica	35	(4)
2001	Beograd	17	(6)
2002	Bokelj	8	(0)
2002–2003	Widzew Łódź	10	(0)
2003	Kujawiak Włocławek	26	(2)
2003–2004	Mogren	4	(0)
2004	Mornar	16	(1)
2004–2005	Kujawiak Włocławek	20	(1)
2005–2007	Zawisza Bydgoszcz (2)	33	(2)
2007	Unia Janikowo	24	(2)
2008–2009	Petrovac	27	(2)
2009–2010	Vllaznia Shkodër	22	(2)
2012–2014	Petrovac	38	(2)
2014–2015	Mornar	25	(0)

International career
- U16 Yugoslavia

Managerial career
- 2019: Petrovac
- * Club domestic league appearances and goals

Željko Mrvaljević (Cyrillic: Жељко Мрваљевић; born 25 June 1979) is a Montenegrin former professional footballer who played as a defender.

== Club career ==
Beside Montenegrin clubs FK Budućnost Podgorica, FK Bokelj, FK Mogren, FK Mornar and OFK Petrovac, he also played in Serbian FK Beograd, Polish Widzew Łódź, Zawisza Bydgoszcz and Zawisza Bydgoszcz, and in Albanian KF Vllaznia Shkodër.

== Honours ==
Petrovac

- Montenegrin Cup: 2008–09
