= Mrvaljević =

Mrvaljević (Serbian Cyrillic: Мрваљевић) is a montenegrin surname, found in Montenegro, Herzegovina and Serbia. It may refer to:

- Draško Mrvaljević (born 1979), Montenegrin handballer
- Srđan Mrvaljević (born 1984), Montenegrin judoka
- Željko Mrvaljević (born 1981), Montenegrin footballer
- Zorica Mrvaljević, Montenegrin writer

== Anthropology ==
A brotherhood in Bjelice is named Mrvaljević. In the Cetinje municipality, Montenegro, the surname was found in Prediš, Malošin Do and Barjamovica (1941 source). In the 19th century, a Mrvaljević family settled in Herzegovina. There is a family that inhabits Potkubaš in Stolac and Hatelji in Berkovići. A Mrvaljević family also settled in Toplica, Serbia (1978 source).
