= Arseniy Protsyshyn =

Ukrainian footballer

Personal information
- Full name: Arseniy Olehovych Protsyshyn
- Date of birth: 29 August 1995 (age 31)
- Place of birth: Ukraine
- Height: 1.83 m (6 ft 0 in)
- Position: Right-back

Youth career
- 2008–2012: UFC Dnipro
- 2012–2014: Metalurh Donetsk

Senior career*
Years	Team	Apps	(Gls)
2014–2015	Vorskla Poltava	0	(0)
2015	Sumy	0	(0)
2015	Sokil Zolochiv	2	(1)
2016	Teplička nad Váhom	7	(0)
2016–2017	Sumy	15	(0)
2017	Rochyn Sosnivka	8	(0)
2017–2019	Cuiavia Inowrocław	24	(7)
2018–2019	→ Bytovia Bytów (loan)	17	(1)
2019	Cuiavia Inowrocław	10	(3)
2020	Bischofshofen	0	(0)
2020–2021	Kryvbas Kryvyi Rih	2	(0)
2021	LNZ Cherkasy	3	(0)
2021–2022	Krystal Kherson	15	(1)
2022–2023	Yunist Verkhnya Bilka		
2023–2024	Kulykiv-Bilka		
- * Club domestic league appearances and goals as of 29 August 2024

Arseniy Olehovych Protsyshyn (born 29 August 1995) is a Ukrainian professional footballer who plays as a right-back.

== Career ==
Protsyshyn began his career in Ukraine with UFC Dnipro and Metalurh Donetsk, featuring for both at youth level. He then moved to Vorskla Poltava, with whom he failed to make a first-team appearance but was an unused substitute on one occasion for a Ukrainian Cup victory away to Nyva Ternopil on 23 August 2014. Protsyshyn made subsequent moves to Sumy and Sokil Zolochiv prior to leaving Ukrainian football for Slovakia's Teplička nad Váhom. He featured seven times towards the end of the 2015–16 2. Liga, including his debut versus Tatran Prešov. Sumy of the Ukrainian First League resigned Protsyshyn in 2016.

Fifteen appearances followed for Protsyshyn in his second spell with Sumy, before he left to spend the rest of 2016–17 with Rochyn Sosnivka. 2017 saw Protsyshyn sign for Polish IV liga side Cuiavia Inowrocław. He netted seven goals in his first campaign. In the next season, he completed a loan up three divisions to play for Bytovia Bytów in the second tier. Protsyshyn's first appearance came in a win away to Bruk-Bet Termalica Nieciecza, which preceded his opening goal for Bytovia Bytów against GKS Tychy on 8 September 2018. Protsyshyn, after seventeen appearances for Bytovia, returned to his parent club in June 2019.

On 31 July 2019, Protsyshyn terminated his contract with Cuiavia Inowrocław. A serious injury prevented the defender from joining a new club, though FC Mynai of the Ukrainian First League allowed him to train with them during his rehabilitation period; with interest of a permanent contract. However, upon recovery, Protsyshyn rejoined Cuiavia Inowrocław and subsequently scored three goals in eleven total matches in 2019–20. He cut short his contract in December 2019, departing his second stay early by two months. Protsyshyn, soon after, agreed a move to Austrian Regionalliga team SK Bischofshofen.

== Career statistics ==
As of 3 July 2020.

Club statistics
Club	Season	League			Cup		Continental		Other		Total	
Club	Season	Division	Apps	Goals	Apps	Goals	Apps	Goals	Apps	Goals	Apps	Goals
Vorskla Poltava	2014–15	Premier League	0	0	0	0	—		0	0	0	0
Sumy	2014–15	First League	0	0	0	0	—		0	0	0	0
Teplička nad Váhom	2015–16	2. Liga	7	0	0	0	—		0	0	7	0
Sumy	2016–17	First League	15	0	0	0	—		0	0	15	0
Rochyn Sosnivka	2016–17	Amateur Championship	6	0	0	0	—		0	0	6	0
Cuiavia Inowrocław	2017–18	IV liga	24	7	0	0	—		0	0	24	7
Cuiavia Inowrocław	2018–19	IV liga	0	0	0	0	—		0	0	0	0
Cuiavia Inowrocław	Total		24	7	0	0	—		0	0	24	7
Bytovia Bytów (loan)	2018–19	I liga	17	1	0	0	—		0	0	17	1
Cuiavia Inowrocław	2019–20	IV liga	10	3	1	0	—		0	0	11	3
Career total			79	11	1	0	—		0	0	80	11
