= Dariusz Jackiewicz =

Polish footballer

Personal information
- Date of birth: 2 December 1973 (age 52)
- Place of birth: Ostróda, Poland
- Height: 1.79 m (5 ft 10 1/2 in)
- Position: Midfielder

Senior career*
Years	Team	Apps	(Gls)
1987–1988	Sokół Ostróda		
1988–1991	Gwarek Zabrze		
1992	Górnik Zabrze	5	(0)
1993	Sokół Ostróda		
1993–1995	Stomil Olsztyn		
1995–1996	Jeziorak Iława		
1996–2001	Amica Wronki	120	(13)
1999	→ Odra Wodzisław Śląski (loan)	12	(1)
2001	Stomil Olsztyn	6	(0)
2002	Dyskobolia Grodzisk Wielkopolski	24	(3)
2003–2004	Bnei Sakhnin	30	(1)
2004–2009	Zagłębie Lubin	114	(6)
2010	ŁKS Łódź	7	(0)
2010	Jeziorak Iława	13	(0)
2011–2012	Wda Świecie	14	(1)
2013–2014	Bzura Chodaków		
2019	Wda II/Tor Świecie	4	(1)

Managerial career
- 2012: Wda Świecie
- 2013–2014: Bzura Chodaków (player-manager)
- 2019–2021: Wda Świecie
- * Club domestic league appearances and goals

Dariusz Jackiewicz (born 2 December 1973) is a Polish football manager and former professional player who played as a midfielder.

== Honours ==
Amica Wronki

- Polish Cup: 1997–98
- Polish Super Cup: 1998

Bnei Sakhnin

- Israel State Cup: 2003–04

Zagłębie Lubin

- Ekstraklasa: 2006–07

Wda II/Tor Świecie

- Klasa A Bydgoszcz I: 2018–19
