= Michał Trzeciakiewicz =

Polish footballer

Personal information
- Full name: Michał Trzeciakiewicz
- Date of birth: 19 February 1984 (age 42)
- Place of birth: Olsztyn, Poland
- Height: 2.00 m (6 ft 6 1/2 in)
- Position: Midfielder

Senior career*
Years	Team	Apps	(Gls)
2002	Warmia i Mazury Olsztyn		
2003	Stomil Olsztyn	15	(0)
2003–2005	Kujawiak Włocławek		
2005–2006	Jagiellonia Białystok	26	(3)
2007–2010	Korona Kielce	8	(2)
2011	KSZO Ostrowiec Świętokrzyski	15	(1)
2011	Sandecja Nowy Sącz	2	(0)
2014–2017	Stomil Olsztyn	55	(8)
- * Club domestic league appearances and goals

Michał Trzeciakiewicz (born 19 February 1984) is a Polish former professional footballer who played as a midfielder.

== Career ==
=== Club ===
He moved from Jagiellonia Białystok to Korona Kielce during the 2006–07 winter break.

In February 2011, he joined KSZO Ostrowiec on a half year contract.

In July 2011, he moved to Sandecja Nowy Sącz on a one-year contract.
