= Zawisza Bydgoszcz (2005–2007) =

- Full name: Zawisza Bydgoszcz Spółka Akcyjna
- Nickname(s): Hydrobudowa; Kujawiak-Zawisza
- Founded: 2005
- Dissolved: 2007
- Ground: Zdzisław Krzyszkowiak Stadium
- Capacity: 20,247
- League: II liga
Home colours	Away colours	Third colours

Zawisza Bydgoszcz SA was a short-lived club that was created when Kujawiak Włocławek were moved to Bydgoszcz and renamed by Hydrobudowa, their owners, from Kujawiak/Hydrobudowa Włocławek.

The original Zawisza Bydgoszcz continued playing in the fourth division. however the new club had a very similar logo and an identical name. As a result, Kujawiak, Zawisza and supporters all over the country boycotted the relocated team. The reserve team continued to play under the name Kujawiak Włocławek in the fourth division.

The club was unofficially called a variety of names to disambiguate: Zawisza Bydgoszcz (2), Kujawiak-Zawisza, Hydrobudowa, Hydrobudowa Zawisza, Zawisza 2, Kujawiak Bydgoszcz.

The club lasted two seasons in the Second Division, before it folded in 2007 as a result of serious corruption allegations and widespread condemnation.

The fans overwhelmingly boycotted support for the club, as did other fans in solidarity. They had already previously opposed a controversial merger with Chemik Bydgoszcz in 2001, choosing to boycott the new merged club (which turned out to be hugely unsuccessful) and support the reserve team which still played under the Zawisza name. Therefore, in 2006, the fans opposed the new relocated Zawisza again opting to continue to support the original team made up of the reserve squad, just like five years earlier. When the "new Zawisza" failed to win any trophies and was embroiled in a match-fixing scandal, subsequently folding, the fans triumphantly announced victory against the media and politicians who supported it.
