= Pakość =

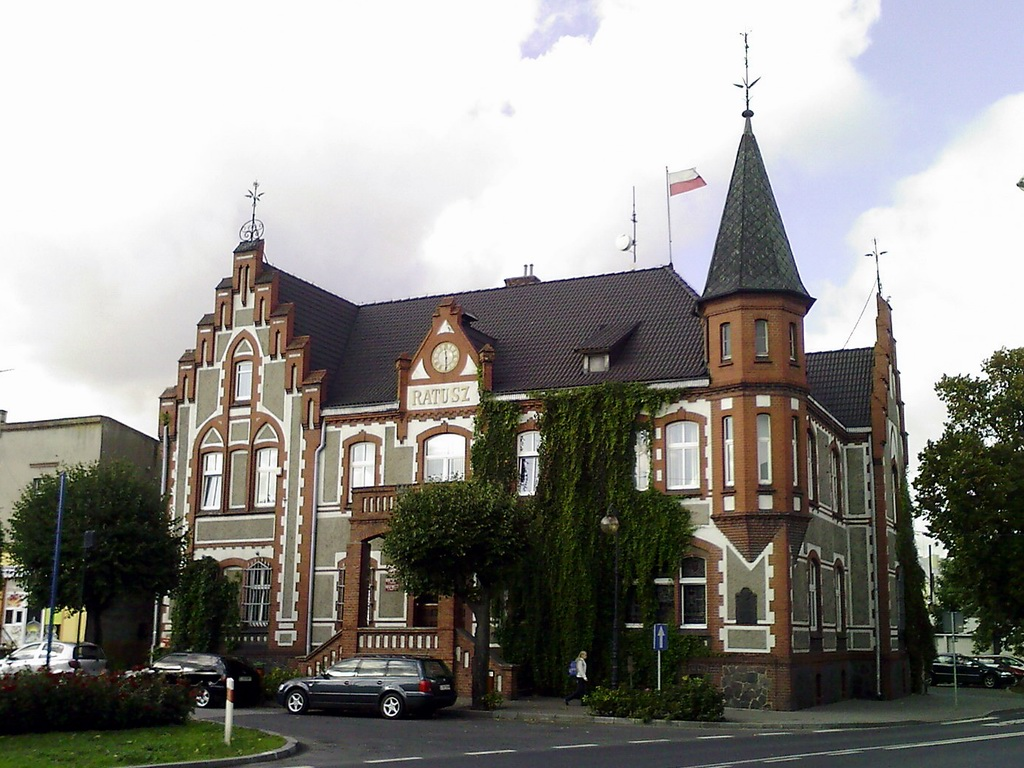
- Town hall

- Coat of arms

- Location within Poland
- Coordinates: 52°48′19″N 18°5′2″E
- Country: Poland
- Voivodeship: Kuyavian-Pomeranian
- County: Inowrocław
- Gmina: Pakość
- First mentioned: 1243
- Town rights: 1359

Area
  - Total: 3.46 km^{2} (1.34 sq mi)

Population (2010)
  - Total: 5,774
  - Density: 1,670/km^{2} (4,320/sq mi)
- Time zone: UTC+1 (CET)
  - Summer (DST): UTC+2 (CEST)
- Postal code: 88–170
- Website: http://www.pakosc.pl

Pakość [ˈpakɔɕt͡ɕ] is a town in Inowrocław County, Kuyavian-Pomeranian Voivodeship, in central Poland, with 5,774 inhabitants (2010). It is located within the historic region of Kuyavia.

The town is the main hub of trade and services in the neighbourhood area. Small industry is based here and the town is an important communication and transport hub.

Pakość is an important centre of worship of the Catholic Church because of the famous calvary – the complex of chapels resembling Jerusalem and commemorating the Passion of Christ.

== Geography ==
Pakość lies on the Noteć River. It is 12 km west of Inowrocław and 8 km north of Janikowo.

== History ==
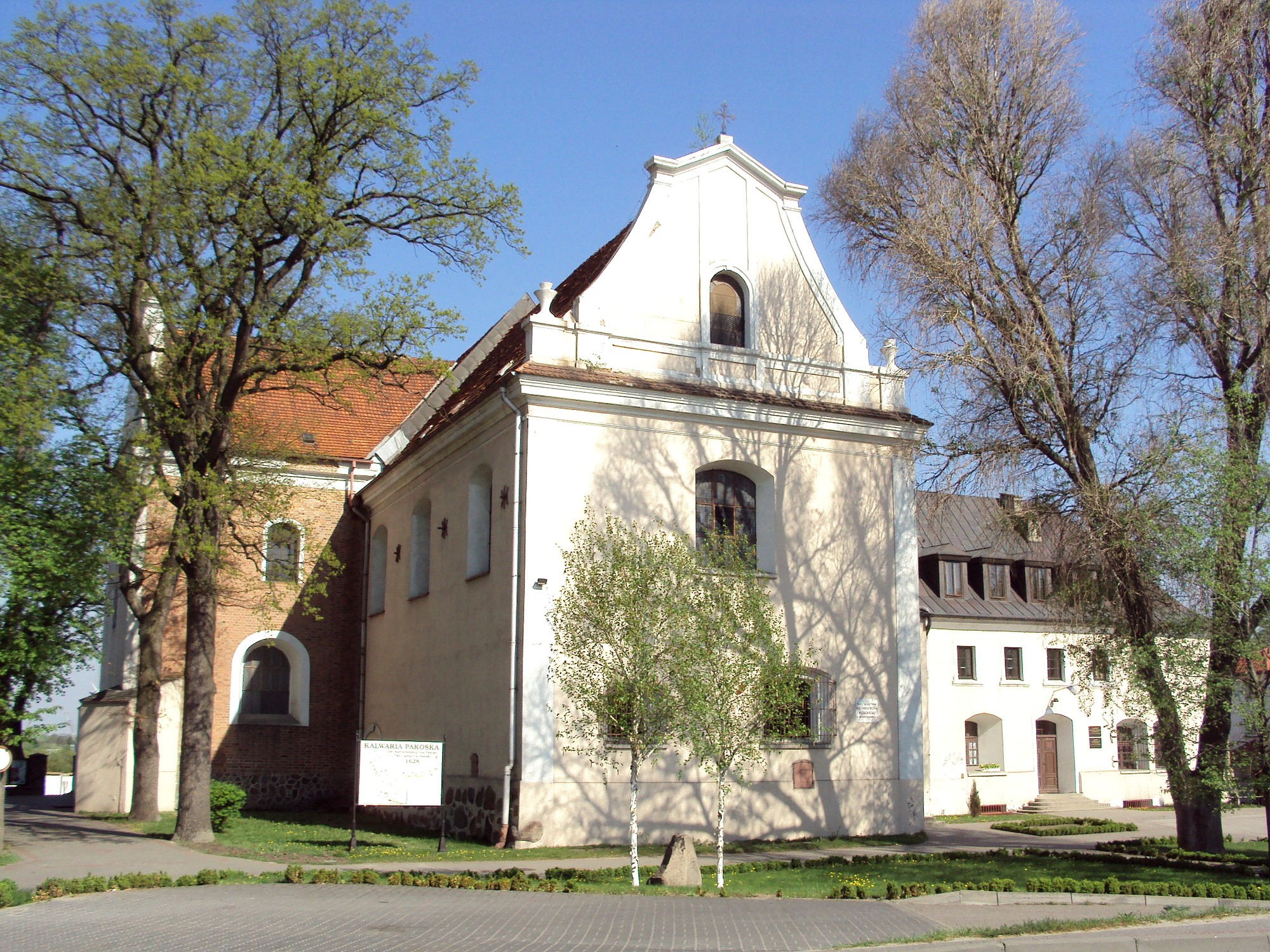
Baroque monastery

The oldest known mention of Pakość comes from 1243. In 1258 a castle was erected. Town privileges were given to Pakość on 9 February 1359. It was a private town, owned by Polish nobility, administratively located in the Inowrocław County in the Inowrocław Voivodeship in the Greater Poland Province. In the 15th and 16th centuries it was a Protestant center. The Działyński noble family founded a Baroque Catholic monastery, which remains one of the landmarks of the town.

Pakość was annexed by Prussia in the First Partition of Poland in 1772. In 1807 it became part of the short-lived Polish Duchy of Warsaw, in 1815 it was re-annexed by Prussia, and in 1871 it became part of Germany. The populace took part in the Greater Poland uprising (1918–19), and Pakość was successfully reintegrated with Poland, after the country regained independence in November 1918.

During the German occupation of Poland in World War II, the occupiers established and operated a forced labour subcamp of the Stalag XXI-D prisoner-of-war camp in the town.

== Demographics ==
Historical population

Year	Pop.	±%
1910	3,770	—
1921	3,336	−11.5%
1931	3,797	+13.8%
1939	3,926	+3.4%

Year	Pop.	±%
1950	3,517	−10.4%
1960	4,328	+23.1%
2010	5,774	+33.4%

== Gallery ==
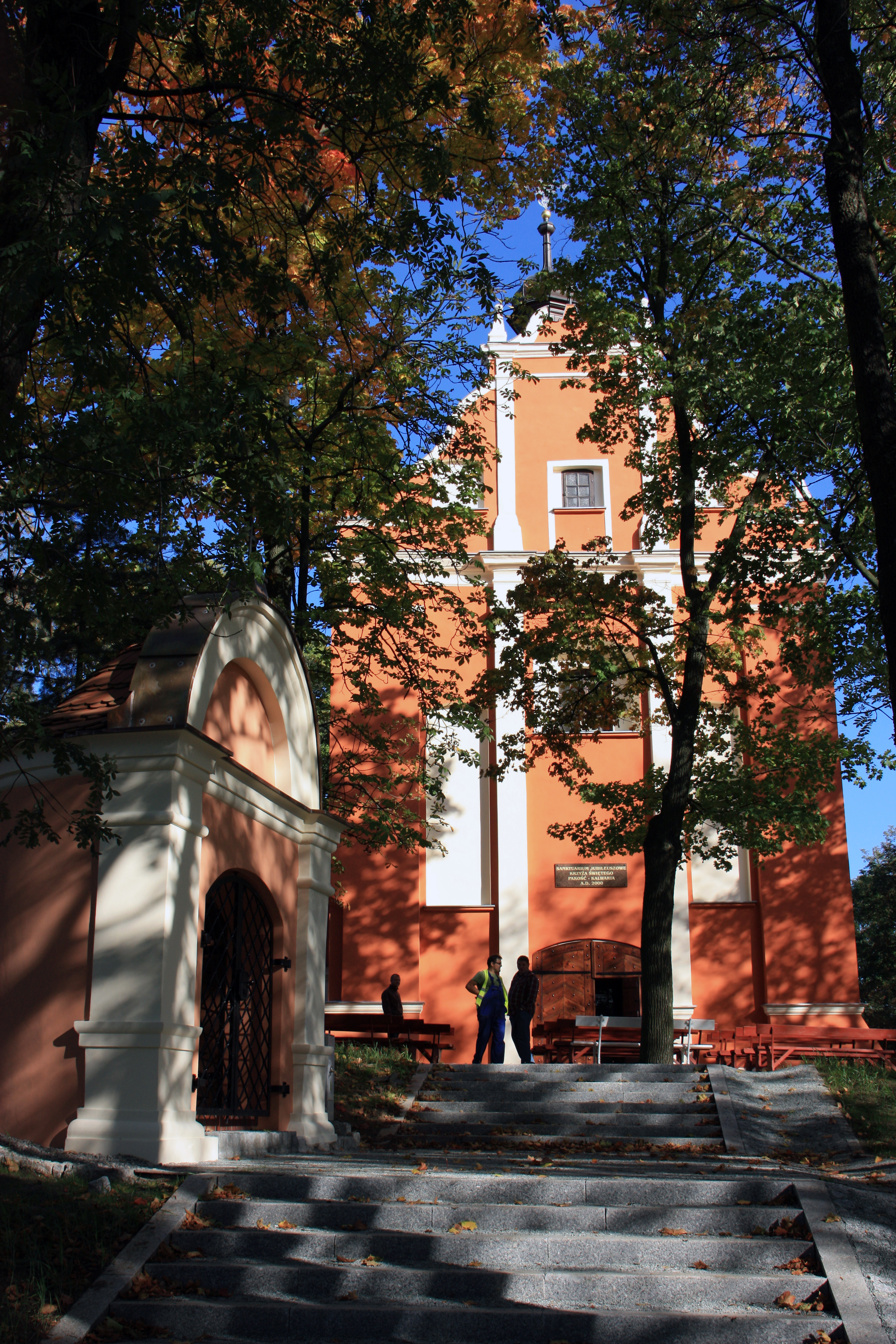
Church of the Crucifixion

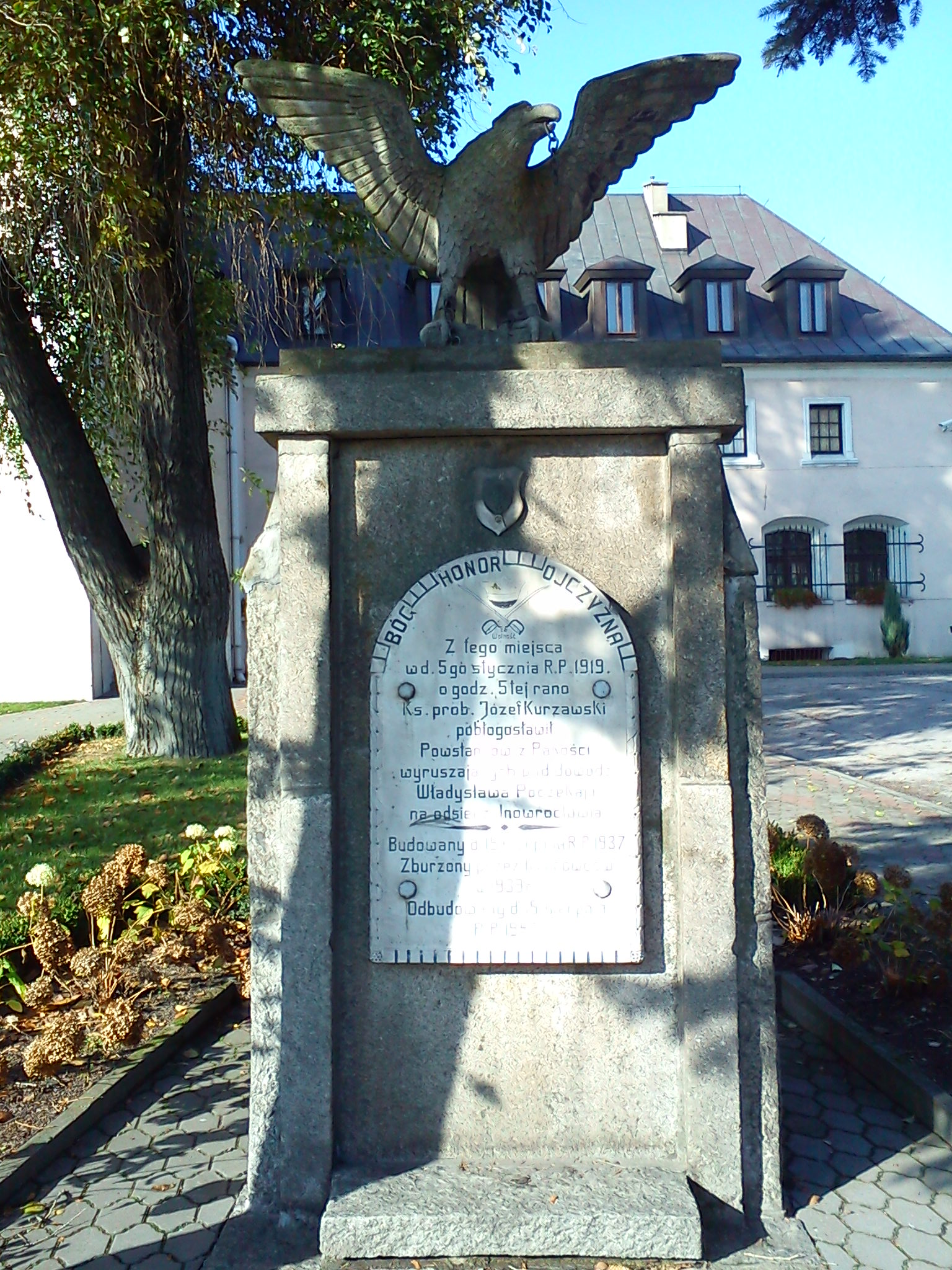
Monument of the Greater Poland uprising

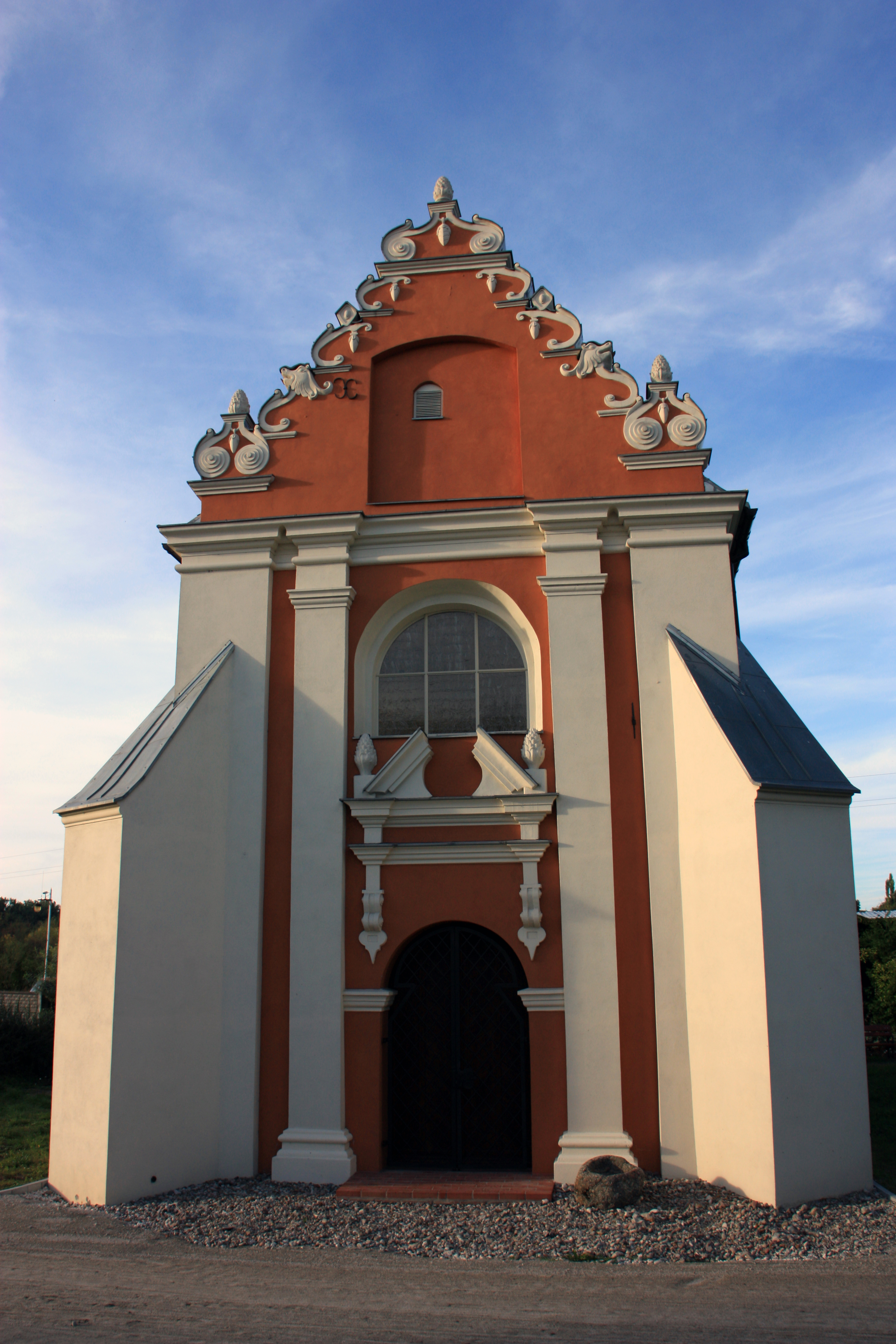
Chapel of the Assumption of Mary

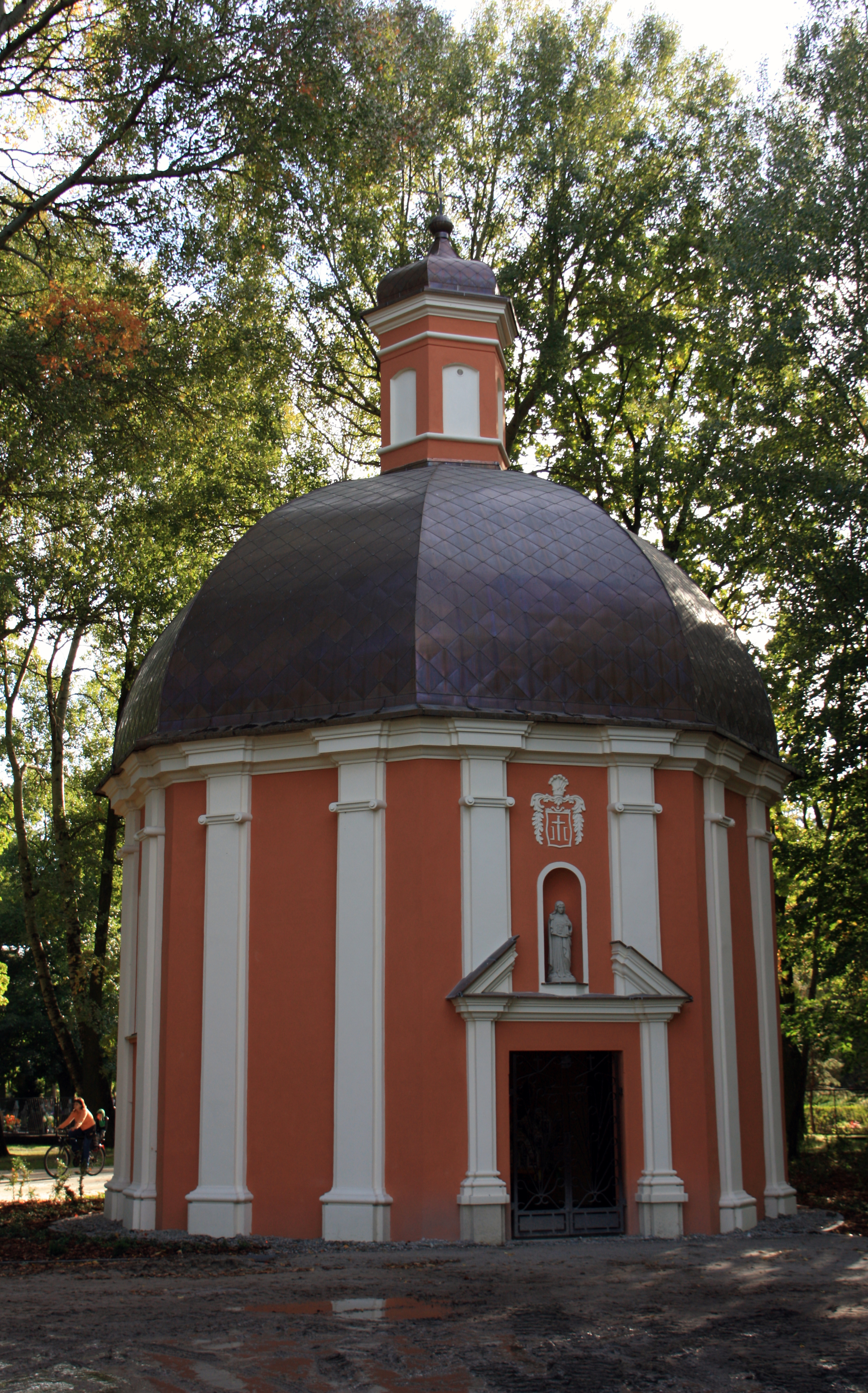
Veronica Chapel

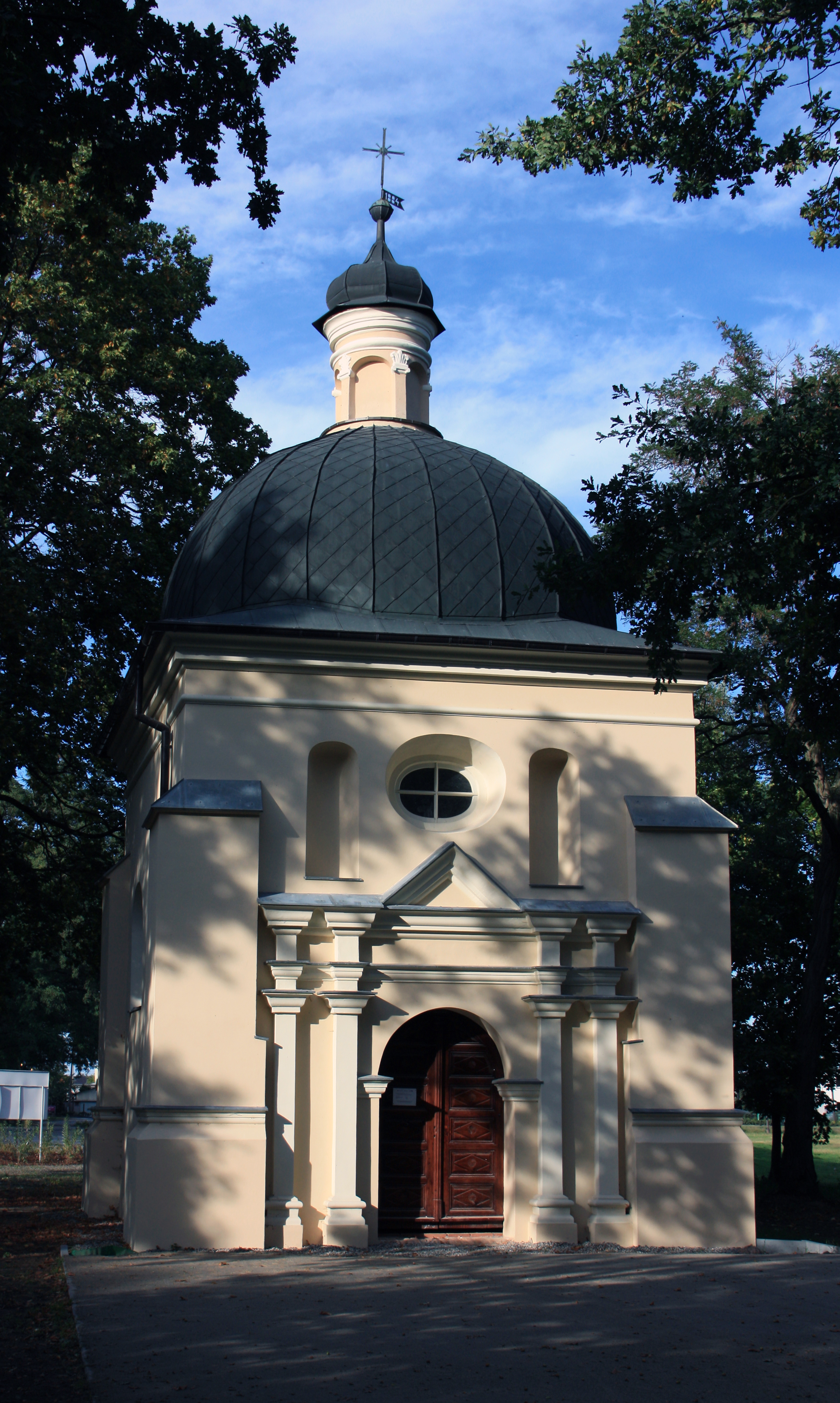
Herod's Palace chapel

== Transport ==
Pakość lies at the junction of vovoideship roads 255 and 251.

The nearest railway station is in Janikowo.

== Sport ==
- Notecianka Pakość – football club
