= Noteć Łabiszyn =

Polish football club

- Full name: Miejski Ludowy Klub Sportowy Noteć Łabiszyn
- Founded: 20 July 1974; 51 years ago
- Ground: Municipal Stadium
- Capacity: 1,000
- Chairman: Jacek Kowalski
- Manager: Jakub Grzelczak
- League: IV liga Kuyavia-Pomerania
- 2024–25: IV liga Kuyavia-Pomerania, 10th of 18

Miejski Ludowy Klub Sportowy Noteć Łabiszyn is a football club from Łabiszyn, Poland. It was founded in July 1974. They are currently playing in IV liga Kuyavia-Pomerania.
