= 2025–26 Arka Gdynia season =

Arka Gdynia
2025–26 season
- Manager: Dawid Szwarga (until 25 March); Dariusz Banasik (from 1 April)
- Stadium: Stadion GOSiR
- Ekstraklasa: 17th
- Polish Cup: Round of 32
- Top goalscorer: Edu Espiau (5)
- Biggest win: Wisła Płock 0–3 Arka Gdynia
- Biggest defeat: Zagłębie Lubin 4–0 Arka Gdynia; Jagiellonia Białystok 4–0 Arka Gdynia; Górnik Zabrze 5–1 Arka Gdynia

The 2025–26 season is the 97th in the history of Morski Związkowy Klub Sportowy Arka Gdynia and the club’s first in the Ekstraklasa since 2020. Arka Gdynia were eliminated in the round of 32 of the Polish Cup. On 25 March 2026, following a 3–0 defeat away to Korona Kielce that left the team battling relegation, head coach Dawid Szwarga departed the club by mutual consent.

== Transfers ==
=== In ===
| Pos. | Player | Transferred from | Fee | Date | Source |
|---|---|---|---|---|---|
| DF | (Poland) Dawid Abramowicz | (Poland) Puszcza Niepołomice | | 1 July 2025 | |
| MF | (Germany) Sebastian Kerk | (Poland) Widzew Łódź | | 1 July 2025 | |
| MF | (France) Aurélien Nguiamba | Unattached | | 1 July 2025 | |
| DF | (Canada) Dominick Zator | (Poland) Korona Kielce | | 1 July 2025 | |
| MF | (Spain) Luis Perea | (Spain) Racing de Ferrol | | 15 July 2025 | |
| FW | (Spain) Edu Espiau | (Spain) Burgos | | 16 July 2025 | |
| FW | (Ukraine) Nazariy Rusyn | (England) Sunderland | Loan | 2 September 2025 | |
| FW | (Poland) Patryk Szysz | (Turkey) İstanbul Başakşehir | | 2 September 2025 | |
| FW | (Latvia) Vladislavs Gutkovskis | (South Korea) Daejeon Hana Citizen | | 18 December 2025 | |
| DF | (Poland) Serafin Szota | (Poland) Śląsk Wrocław | | 18 January 2026 | |
| MF | (Poland) Oskar Kubiak | (Poland) Sokół Kleczew | Loan return | 23 January 2026 | |
| GK | (Romania) Andrei Vlad | Unattached | | 27 March 2026 | |

== Pre-season and friendlies ==
| 21 June 2025 | GKS Tychy | 2–0 | Arka Gdynia |
| 12:00 |

| 28 June 2025 | Arka Gdynia | 5–0 | Miedź Legnica |
| 11:00 |

| 2 July 2025 | Arka Gdynia | 2–0 | Pogoń Szczecin |
| 11:00 |

| 5 July 2025 | Arka Gdynia | 2–0 | Chojniczanka Chojnice |
| 12:00 |

| 12 July 2025 | Arka Gdynia | 1–2 | (Israel) Hapoel Jerusalem |
| 12:00 |

| 10 January 2026 | Arka Gdynia | 1–1 | (Romania) Csíkszereda Miercurea Ciuc |
| 13:30 |

| 15 January 2026 | Arka Gdynia | 4–0 | (South Korea) Gangwon FC |
| 13:00 |

| 20 January 2026 | Arka Gdynia | 4–1 | (Serbia) Spartak Subotica |
| 09:00 |

| 20 January 2026 | Arka Gdynia | 2–0 | (Serbia) Radnički Niš |
| 15:30 |

== Competitions ==
=== Ekstraklasa ===
| Pos | Team | Pld | W | D | L | GF | GA | GD | Pts | Qualification or relegation |
|---|---|---|---|---|---|---|---|---|---|---|
| 14 | Legia Warsaw | 30 | 8 | 13 | 9 | 34 | 36 | −2 | 37 | |
| 15 | Widzew Łódź | 30 | 10 | 6 | 14 | 36 | 37 | −1 | 36 | |
| 16 | Piast Gliwice | 29 | 10 | 6 | 13 | 35 | 39 | −4 | 36 | Relegation to I liga |
| 17 | Arka Gdynia | 29 | 9 | 7 | 13 | 30 | 50 | −20 | 34 | Relegation to I liga |
| 18 | Bruk-Bet Termalica Nieciecza | 30 | 7 | 7 | 16 | 36 | 55 | −19 | 28 | Relegation to I liga |

Updated to match(es) played on 26 April 2026. Source: ekstraklasa.org 90minut.pl
Rules for classification: 1) Points; 2) Head-to-head points; 3) Head-to-head goal difference; 4) Goal difference; 5) Goals scored; 6) Number of wins; 7) Number of away wins; 8) Lower number of points based on yellow and red cards (red card = 3 points, yellow card = 1 point, sending-off = 3 points - including 1 point for first yellow card); 9) Fairplay ranking; 10) Draw.
(Note: Head-to-head record is used only after all the matches between the teams in question have been played)

==== Results summary ====
| Overall | | | | | | | | Home | | | | | | Away | | | | | |
| Pld | W | D | L | GF | GA | GD | Pts | W | D | L | GF | GA | GD | W | D | L | GF | GA | GD |
|---|---|---|---|---|---|---|---|---|---|---|---|---|---|---|---|---|---|---|---|
| 0 | 0 | 0 | 0 | 0 | 0 | 0 | 0 | 0 | 0 | 0 | 0 | 0 | 0 | 0 | 0 | 0 | 0 | 0 | 0 |

==== Matches ====
| 20 July 2025 1 | Motor Lublin | 1–0 | Arka Gdynia |
| 17:30 |

| 25 July 2025 2 | Arka Gdynia | 1–1 | Radomiak Radom |
| 20:30 |

| 3 August 2025 3 | Legia Warsaw | 4–1 | Arka Gdynia |
| 20:15 |

| 9 August 2025 4 | Arka Gdynia | 2–1 | Pogoń Szczecin |
| 17:30 |

| 16 August 2025 5 | GKS Katowice | 4–1 | Arka Gdynia |
| 17:30 |

| 24 August 2025 6 | Lechia Gdańsk | 1–0 | Arka Gdynia |
| 17:30 |

| 29 August 2025 7 | Arka Gdynia | 1–0 | Wisła Płock |
| 18:00 |

| 14 September 2025 8 | Widzew Łódź | 2–0 | Arka Gdynia |
| 17:30 |

| 20 September 2025 9 | Arka Gdynia | 0–0 | Korona Kielce |
| 14:45 |

| 29 September 2025 10 | Zagłębie Lubin | 4–0 | Arka Gdynia |
| 18:00 |

| 4 October 2025 11 | Arka Gdynia | 2–1 | KS Cracovia |
| 20:15 |

| 18 October 2025 12 | Jagiellonia Białystok | 4–0 | Arka Gdynia |
| 17:30 |

| 25 October 2025 13 | Arka Gdynia | 2–1 | Piast Gliwice |
| 14:45 |

| 2 November 2025 14 | Górnik Zabrze | 5–1 | Arka Gdynia |
| 12:15 |

| 9 November 2025 15 | Arka Gdynia | 3–1 | Lech Poznań |
| 20:15 |

| 21 November 2025 16 | Bruk-Bet Termalica Nieciecza | 2–0 | Arka Gdynia |
| 18:00 |

| 30 November 2025 17 | Arka Gdynia | 1–4 | Raków Częstochowa |
| 14:45 |

| 6 December 2025 18 | Arka Gdynia | 1–0 | Motor Lublin |
| 12:15 |

| 30 January 2026 19 | Radomiak Radom | v | Arka Gdynia |
| 20:30 |

| 7 February 2026 20 | Arka Gdynia | 2–2 | Legia Warsaw |
| 14:45 |

| 15 February 2026 21 | Pogoń Szczecin | 1–0 | Arka Gdynia |
| 14:45 |

| 22 February 2026 22 | Arka Gdynia | 2–1 | GKS Katowice |
| 12:15 |

| 27 February 2026 23 | Arka Gdynia | 2–2 | Lechia Gdańsk |
| 20:30 |

| 5 March 2026 19 | Radomiak Radom | 3–1 | Arka Gdynia |
| 20:30 |

| 9 March 2026 24 | Wisła Płock | 0–3 | Arka Gdynia |
| 19:00 |

| 15 March 2026 25 | Arka Gdynia | 0–0 | Widzew Łódź |
| 12:15 |

| 22 March 2026 26 | Korona Kielce | 3–0 | Arka Gdynia |
| 12:15 |

| 7 April 2026 27 | Arka Gdynia | 3–1 | Zagłębie Lubin |
| 19:00 |

| 12 April 2026 28 | KS Cracovia | 2–2 | Arka Gdynia |
| 12:15 |

| 19 April 2026 29 | Arka Gdynia | 0–3 | Jagiellonia Białystok |
| 17:30 |

| 27 April 2026 30 | Piast Gliwice | v | Arka Gdynia | Gliwice |
| 19:00 | | | | Stadium: Piotr Wieczorek Municipal Stadium; Referee: Szymon Marciniak |

=== Polish Cup ===
| 25 September 2025 First round | Arka Gdynia | 1–0 (a.e.t.) | Motor Lublin |
| 20:30 |

| 30 October 2025 Round of 32 | Arka Gdynia | 1–2 | Górnik Zabrze |
| 18:00 |
