= Pogoń Mogilno =

Polish football club

- Full name: Klub Sportowy Pogoń Mogilno
- Founded: 23 May 1923; 103 years ago
- Ground: Michał Olszewski Olympic Stadium
- Capacity: 2,000
- Chairman: Iwona Kopińska
- Manager: Szymon Kmiecik
- League: IV liga Kuyavia-Pomerania
- 2025–26: IV liga Kuyavia-Pomerania, 2nd of 18
Home colours	Away colours

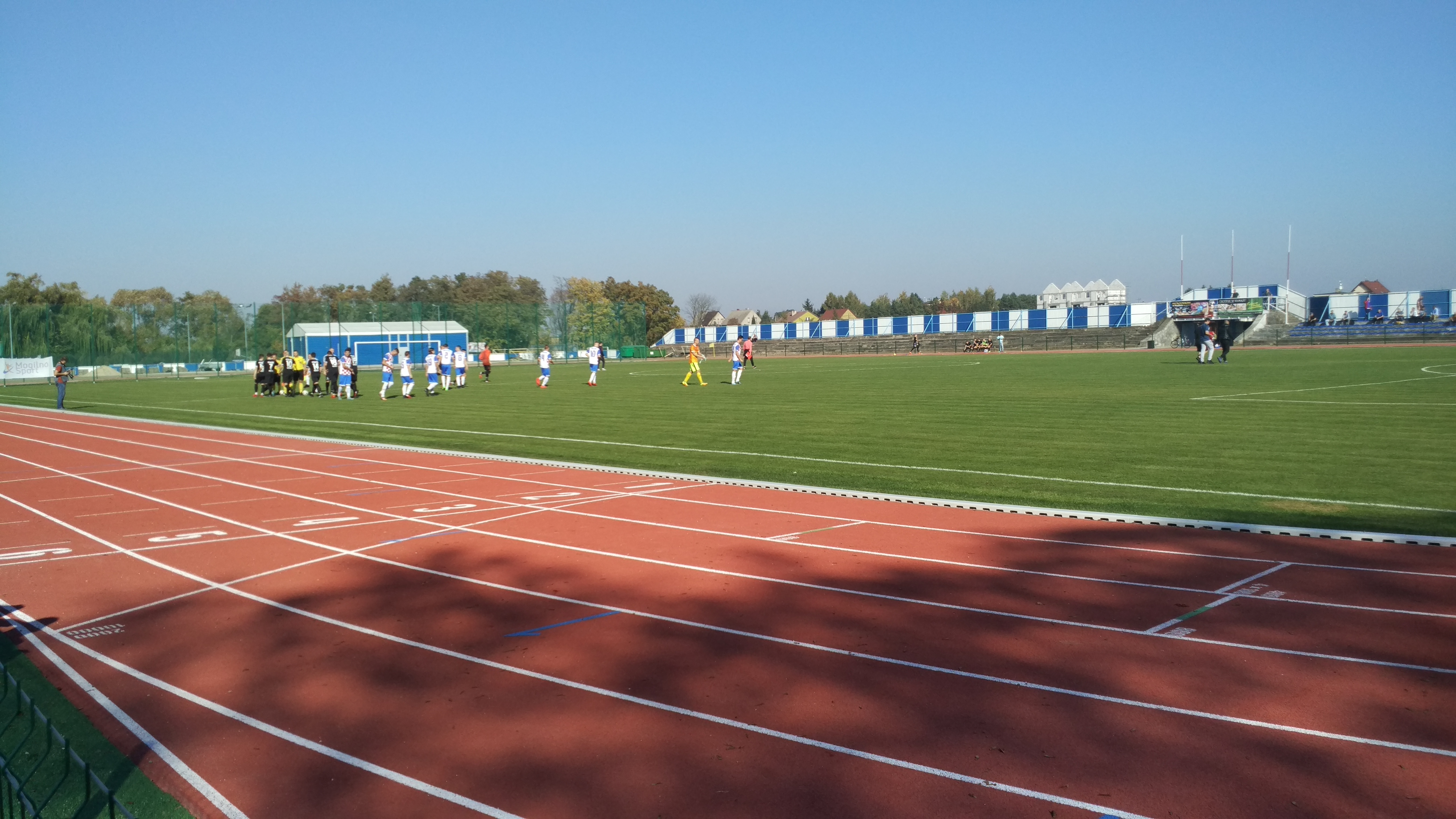
Mogilno Olympic Stadium

Klub Sportowy Pogoń Mogilno is a football club from Mogilno, Poland. It was founded in 1923. They currently play in the IV liga Kuyavia-Pomerania.
