= Marcin Klatt =

Polish footballer (born 1985)

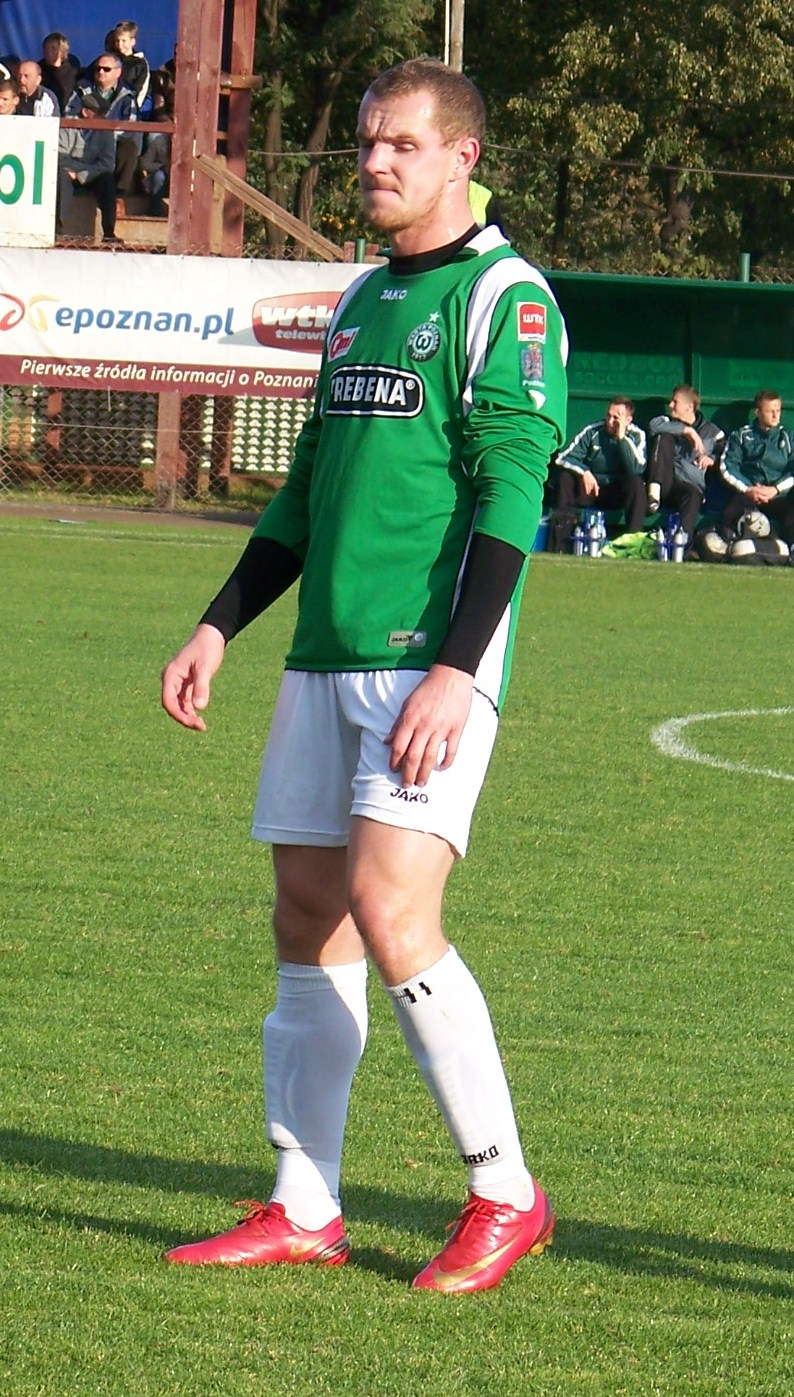

Personal information
- Date of birth: 4 May 1985 (age 41)
- Place of birth: Poznań, Poland
- Height: 1.85 m (6 ft 1 in)
- Position: Striker

Youth career
- 1993–2002: Lech Poznań

Senior career*
Years	Team	Apps	(Gls)
2002–2003	Lech Poznań	7	(0)
2003–2005	Kujawiak Włocławek		
2005–2007	Legia Warsaw	9	(4)
2006	→ Korona Kielce (loan)	3	(0)
2006–2007	→ Zawisza Bydgoszcz (loan)	5	(1)
2007–2008	ŁKS Łódź	12	(0)
2008–2009	Warta Poznań	57	(19)
2010–2013	Pogoń Szczecin	31	(6)
2011–2012	→ Warta Poznań (loan)	18	(3)
2013	Warta Poznań	5	(0)
2013	Kolejarz Stróże	2	(0)

International career
2004–2005	Poland U21		
2005	Poland B	1	(1)
- * Club domestic league appearances and goals

Marcin Klatt (born 4 May 1985) is a Polish former professional footballer who played as a striker.

== Honours ==
Legia Warsaw

- Ekstraklasa: 2005–06
