= Kujawiak Kowal =

Polish football club

- Full name: Miejsko-Gminny Klub Sportowy Kujawiak Kowal
- Founded: 1954
- Ground: Kazimierza Górskiego Municipal Stadium in Kowal (Polish: Stadion Miejski im. Kazimierza Górskiego w Kowalu); Kowal, Poland
- Capacity: 5000
- Chairman: Grzegorz Szefler
- Manager: Dawid Kwiatkowski
- League: IV liga Cuyavia-Pomerania
- Website: kkowal.futbolowo.pl
Home colours	Away colours

MGKS Kujawiak Kowal (currently known as MGKS Lumac Kujawiak Kowal for branding purposes) is a football club from Kowal, Poland. It was founded in 1954. As of the 2025/26 season the club competes in the IV liga Kuyavia-Pomerania.
