= Sparta Janowiec Wielkopolski =

Football club in Poland

- Full name: Ludowy Klub Sportowy Sparta Janowiec Wielkopolski
- Founded: 10 May 1925; 100 years ago
- Ground: Municipal Stadium
- Capacity: 1,000
- Chairman: Cezary Danke
- Manager: Robert Zacharko
- League: Klasa A Bydgoszcz II
- 2024–25: 16th of 16 (relegated)
- Website: Sparta Janowiec Wielkopolski on Facebook
Home colours

LKS Sparta Janowiec Wielkopolski is a football club in Janowiec Wielkopolski, Poland, founded in 1925. As of the 2025/26 season, they play in the Bydgoszcz IV group of the Klasa B.
