= Notecianka Pakość =

Polish football club

- Full name: Klub Sportowy; Notecianka Pakość
- Founded: 1951
- Ground: Stadion Miejski; Pakość, Poland
- Capacity: 1.000
- Chairman: (Poland) Gwidon Sudoł
- Manager: (Poland) Mirosław Milewski
- League: Klasa okręgowa: Kuyavian-Pomeranian II
- 2024/25: 8th of 16
- Website: Notecianka Pakość on Facebook
Home colours	Away colours

Notecianka Pakość is a football club based in Pakość, Poland. As of the 2025/26 season, they compete in group II of the Kuyavian-Pomeranian Klasa okręgowa.

The club played in the Poland III Liga during the 1986/87 season and returned having finishing second in the Polish IV liga in 2008–09; although the league was reorganised following the 2007–08 season, meaning they still competed in the fourth tier of Polish football.
