= Cuiavia Inowrocław =

Polish football club

- Full name: Klub Sportowy Cuiavia Inowrocław
- Founded: 1922; 103 years ago
- Ground: Stadion Miejski
- Capacity: 3,584
- Chairman: Sławomir Roszak
- Manager: Szymon Maziarz
- League: IV liga Kuyavia-Pomerania
- 2023–24: IV liga Kuyavia-Pomerania, 5th of 18
- Website: https://www.cuiavia.pl
Home colours	Away colours

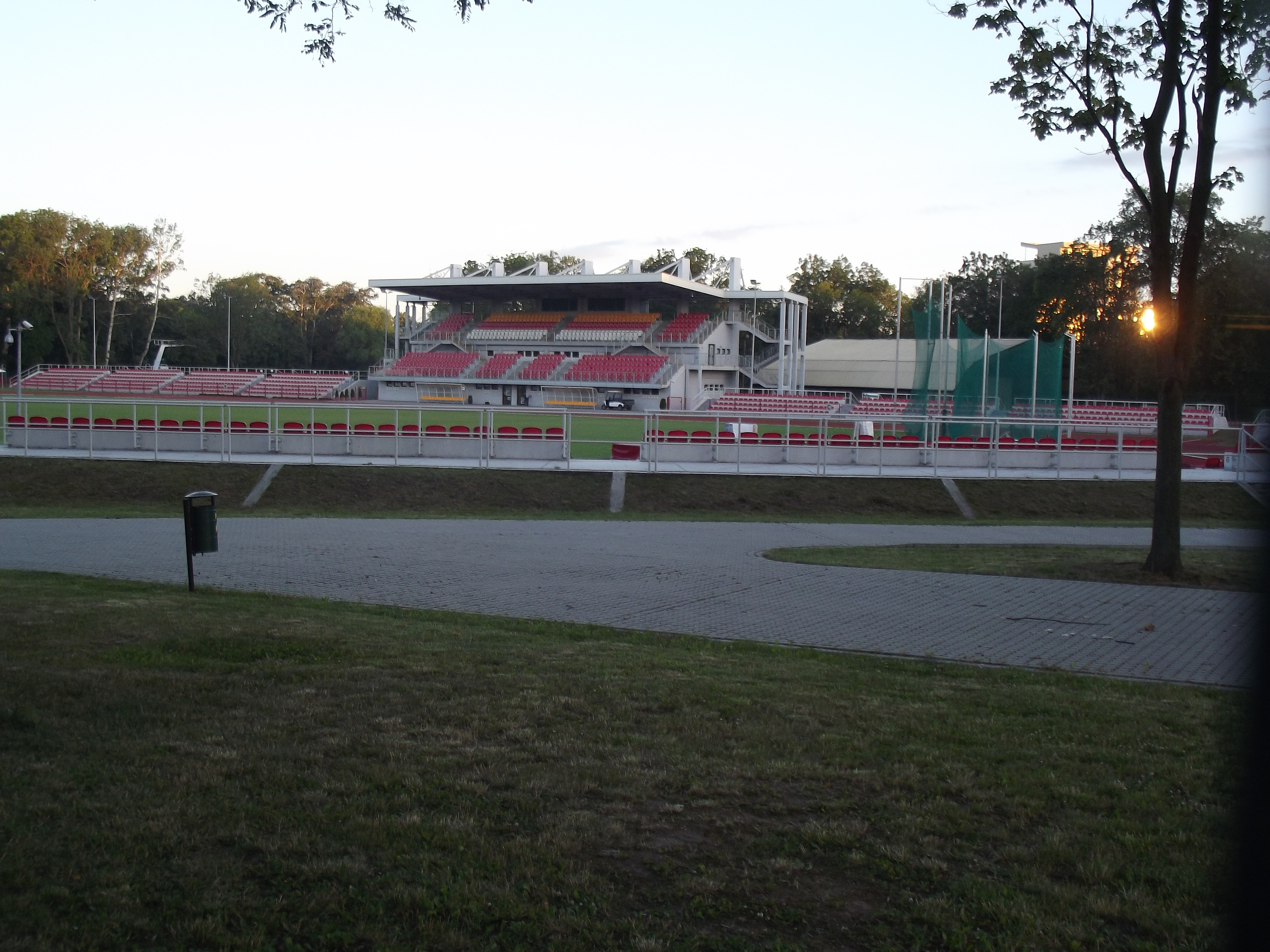
Stadion Miejski (Inowrocław)

Klub Sportowy Cuiavia Inowrocław is a football club from Inowrocław, Poland. It was founded in 1922. They currently compete in the IV liga Kuyavia-Pomerania, the fifth division of Polish football.

Cuiavia reached the second round of the 1989–90 Polish Cup, where the club lost to GKS Bełchatów.
