= Wda Świecie =

Polish football club

- Full name: Klub Sportowy Wda Świecie
- Founded: 8 March 1957; 69 years ago
- Ground: Stadion Sportowy Wda
- Capacity: 3,000
- Chairman: Krzysztof Kosecki
- Manager: Maciej Megger
- League: III liga, group II
- 2025–26: III liga, group II, 9th of 18
- Website: wda-swiecie.pl
Home colours	Away colours

The banner/flag of the sports club that is frequently flown at matches and sometimes at training.

Wda Świecie, known fully as Klub Sportowy Wda Świecie, is a Polish football club based in Świecie, founded in 1957. They currently play in group II of the III liga's fourth tier, after winning the IV liga Kuyavia-Pomerania in 2024.

Wda has participated in three editions of the Polish Cup, but has never advanced beyond the first round.
