= Szubinianka Szubin =

Polish football club

- Full name: Ludowy Klub Sportowy Szubinianka Szubin
- Founded: 29 December 1959; 65 years ago
- Ground: Szubin Municipal Stadium
- Capacity: 1,500
- Chairman: Mikołaj Kalinowski
- Manager: Patryk Jurkiewicz
- League: Klasa A Bydgoszcz II
- 2023–24: Klasa A Bydgoszcz II, 7th of 14
- Website: https://www.szubinianka.pl
Home colours

LKS Szubinianka Szubin is a Polish football club based in Szubin, founded in 1959. Its highest ever position was reaching the fourth tier in 2000. Its colours are blue and white.
