= Lech Rypin =

Polish football club

- Full name: Rypiński Klub Sportowy; Lech Rypin
- Founded: 1922; 103 years ago
- Ground: MOSiR Stadium
- Capacity: 1,233
- Chairman: Sławomir Stefański
- Manager: Szymon Moszczyński
- League: IV liga Kuyavia-Pomerania
- 2023–24: IV liga Kuyavia-Pomerania, 6th of 18
- Website: lech-rypin.pl
Home colours	Away colours

Lech Rypin is a Polish football club from Rypin. They are currently playing in the IV liga Kuyavia-Pomerania, the fifth level of the national league system. They played in the fourth division in the 1976–77, 1978–79 and 1997–98 seasons.

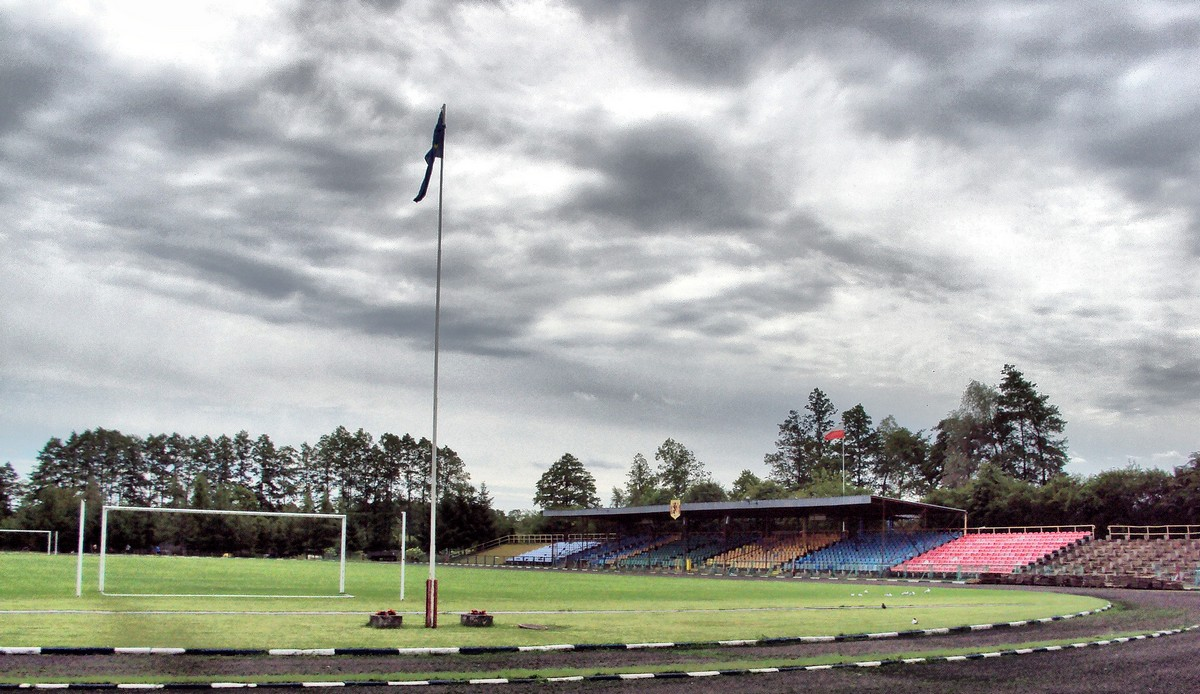
Ground: MOSiR Stadium
