= Włocłavia Włocławek =

WKP Włocłavia Włocławek
- Full name: Włocławski Klub Piłkarski Włocłavia Włocławek
- Nickname: Szlachta Kujaw (The Nobles of Kuyavia)
- Founded: 1946; 80 years ago
- Ground: OSiR Stadium
- Capacity: 4,980
- Chairman: Damian Boruczkowski
Home colours	Away colours

WKP Włocłavia Włocławek is Polish football club from Włocławek, Poland.

== History ==
The club's history is that of relative obscurity, languishing in the lower leagues usually around the 5th to 3rd tiers of football throughout its history. In the 1996–97 season, the team started to climb slightly up the leagues due to various complicated mergers with Jagiellonka and Wisła, causing various name changes such as Jagiellonka/Wisła Włocławek in 1997 for example. Despite this, as the level of football standard rose so did the attendances, reaching an all-time high of 7000 spectators for the inaugural match of their highest ever league start in I liga in 1997. Successive relegations followed, and after relegation from II liga the club was disbanded. It was however refounded under the name Włocłavia and started the 1999–00 season in the fifth tier. The club's fortunes have since improved slightly, winning the regional Polish Cup in 2013.

After finishing the 2022–23 IV liga season as runners-up of the Kuyavia-Pomerania group, Włocłavia withdrew their senior team from competition.

== Honours ==
- Polish Cup (Kuyavia-Pomerania regionals): 2012–13
- I liga participants - 1997–98

== Fans & rivalries ==
Włocłavia fans are also supporters of ŁKS Łódź. Fierce cross-town rivals Kujawiak Włocławek contest the local derby with them.
