= Gopło Kruszwica =

Polish football club

- Full name: Klub Piłkarski Gopło Kruszwica
- Founded: 1925; 100 years ago
- Ground: Municipal Stadium
- Capacity: 360
- Chairman: Marcin Borys
- Manager: Artur Polehojko
- League: Regional league Kuyavia-Pomerania II
- 2023–24: Regional league Kuyavia-Pomerania II, 10th of 16

Klub Piłkarski Gopło Kruszwica is a football club from Kruszwica, Poland. It was founded in 1925. As of the 2024–25 season, they compete in the Kuyavia-Pomerania II group of the regional league.
