= Start Radziejów =

Polish football club

MKS Start Radziejów
- Full name: Miejski Klub Sportowy Start Radziejów
- Founded: 1948; 77 years ago
- Ground: Józef Górczyński MOSiR Stadium
- Capacity: 5,000
- Chairman: Wojciech Jabłoński
- Manager: Jacek Gawinecki
- League: Klasa A Włocławek
- 2023–24: Klasa A Włocławek, 7th of 13

Miejski Klub Sportowy Start Radziejów is a football club from Radziejów, Poland. It was founded in 1948. In the 2011–12 season, it played in the IV liga, the fifth level of league competition.
