= Chemik Bydgoszcz (football) =

Polish association football club

- Full name: Bydgoski Klub Sportowy Chemik Bydgoszcz
- Founded: 1949; 77 years ago (as Koło Sportowe Wisła Łęgnowo); 1951; 75 years ago (football section, as KS Unia Łęgnowo)
- Ground: Czesław Kobus Stadium
- Capacity: 15,000 (1,000 seated)
- Chairman: Mikołaj Włoch
- Manager: Wiktor Osiński
- League: III liga, group II
- 2025–26: IV liga Kuyavia-Pomerania, 1st of 18 (promoted)
- Website: www.chemikbydgoszcz.pl
colours	colours

BKS Chemik Bydgoszcz is a Polish association football club based in Bydgoszcz as part of the multi-sports parent club.

== History ==
In 1947 the country decided to rebuild its infrastructure and re-opened the local chemical plant which manufactured explosive materials in 1947. In 1949 its employees registered a sports club under the name Koło Sportowe Wisła Łęgnowo or KS Wisła for short. The club was re-registered as Unia Łęgnowo in 1951. In the 1950s and 1960s, the club played in the lowest regional competitions. The matches were played on a grass pitch at ul. Hutnicza, near the gate of the plant of Zakłady Chemiczne Zachem.

A significant increase in the sporting level took place in the mid-1970s after the club's name was changed to BKS Chemik, incorporated into the parent multi-sports club which base was expanded to include a football stadium in Wyżyny along with a training ground complex.

In the 1976–77 season, they played for the first time in the third league, and in the 1979–80 season, they made their debut in the second league. In 1979, to celebrate the promotion of Chemik to the second tier, a friendly match was played with the West German club FC Oberrot, which was won 8–0. The match was spectated by 10,000 fans. The 1980s saw Chemik back in the third division. After obtaining sponsorship from Weltinex in 1991, they were promoted back up for two seasons (1991–1993). In the 1991–92 season, they reached the highest league pyramid position in the club's history, 5th in the second tier. Then, for 13 seasons (until 2006) they played in the third division.

In the years 2001–2004, they performed under the name of Chemik / Zawisza Bydgoszcz after a controversial merger with Zawisza Bydgoszcz. Zawisza's reserve team was initially meant to be called Zawisza-Chemik, although ultimately the reserve team remained as simply "Zawisza". The merger turned out to be very unsuccessful, and the Zawisza's senior side started anew from the bottom of the league pyramid, with the senior merged side reverting to "Chemik", leaving the reserve team in the fifth division, which subsequently became Zawisza's senior team.

After the autumn round of 2011, the team withdrew from the fourth league, falling into the district league as a result. Since 2015, the team has been promoted every year. In the 2017–18 season, the club was promoted back to the fifth division.

== Notable players ==
Internationally capped players

- Stefan Majewski
