= Zdrój Ciechocinek =

Polish football club

CKS Zdrój Ciechocinek
- Full name: Ciechociński Klub Sportowy; Zdrój Ciechocinek
- Founded: 1922; 104 years ago (as Harcerski Klub Sportowy)
- Ground: OSiR
- Capacity: 500
- Chairman: Andrzej Wiśniewski
- Manager: Krzysztof Mordziński
- League: Regional league Kuyavia-Pomerania II
- 2025–26: Regional league Kuyavia-Pomerania II, 13th of 16
- Website: https://ckszdroj.futbolowo.pl/index.php

CKS Zdrój Ciechocinek is a Polish football club based in Ciechocinek, Poland. They currently compete in the regional league.

== See also ==
- Football in Poland
