= Dąb Barcin =

Polish football club

LKS Dąb Barcin
- Full name: Ludowy Klub Sportowy Dąb Barcin
- Founded: 1963
- Dissolved: 2018 (refounded 2023)
- Ground: Park Leśny
- Capacity: 1000
- League: Klasa A, grupa: Bydgoszcz II
- 2024-25: 3rd of 14
- Website: LKS "Dąb" Barcin 1963 on Facebook
Home colours	Away colours

Dąb Barcin is a football club located in Barcin, Poland. It was originally founded in 1963, and dissolved after the 2017–18 Klasa A season.

== History ==
=== Club name ===
The club takes its name, Dąb (transl. oak), in reference to a local legend regarding an oak tree that was planted in Barcin by Władysław II Jagiełło in 1410.

=== Success ===
At the end of the 2023/4 campaign, Dąb finished 2nd in the Klasa A, but missed out on promotion to the klasa okręgowa after getting defeated by Mień Lipno in the playoffs.
