= Chemik/Zawisza Bydgoszcz =

Polish association football merger

- Full name: Chemik/Zawisza Bydgoszcz
- Founded: 2001
- Dissolved: 10 August 2004
- Ground: Stadion im. Zdzisława Krzyszkowiaka
- Manager: Bogdan Saboń, Piotr Gruszka (last)

Chemik/Zawisza Bydgoszcz refers to an unsuccessful short-lived controversial merger between Polish association football clubs Chemik Bydgoszcz and Zawisza Bydgoszcz between 2001 and 2004.

Zawisza's reserve team was initially meant to be called Zawisza-Chemik, although ultimately the reserve team remained as simply "Zawisza". The merger turned out to be very unsuccessful, and the Zawisza's senior side started anew from the bottom of the league pyramid, with the senior merged side reverting to "Chemik", leaving the reserve team in the fifth division, which subsequently became Zawisza's senior team.

Zawisza fans vehemently opposed the controversial merger, choosing to boycott the new merged club (which turned out to be hugely unsuccessful) and support the reserve team which still played under the Zawisza name.

On 10 August 2004, the club returned to the name BKS Chemik Bydgoszcz.

== See also ==
- Chemik Bydgoszcz
- Zawisza Bydgoszcz
