= Kujawiak Włocławek =

Polish sports club

- Full name: Klub Sportowy Kujawiak Włocławek
- Nicknames: Żółto-Niebiescy (The Yellow and Blues); Duma Kujaw (The Pride of Kuyavia)
- Founded: 1911; 115 years ago
- Dissolved: 2008; 18 years ago
- Ground: OSiR Stadium
- Capacity: 7,160
Home colours	Away colours

Kujawiak Włocławek was a Polish football and athletics club based in Włocławek, Poland.

Its claim to fame is that the famous Polish singer Maryla Rodowicz and international javelin thrower Zygmunt Jałoszyński used to actively train at the club. Marcin Klatt, Jerzy Engel and Rezső Patkoló has played for the football team.

They shared a rivalry with neighbours Włocłavia Włocławek.

== History ==
The club was founded in 1911 making it one of the oldest clubs in Poland. The club had a very successful period in the club's history in the 2000s. Having spent the 2004–05 season in the second flight, they enjoyed a marvellous cup run during the 2005–06 campaign, where they reached the quarter-final after beating two top-flight teams Cracovia and Pogoń Szczecin, before being eventually knocked out by another top-flight team Wisła Płock.

This golden era came to end in autumn 2005 when Zawisza Bydgoszcz SA was created, resulting to Kujawiak being moved to Bydgoszcz and renamed by their owners Hydrobudowa. The original Zawisza Bydgoszcz continued playing in the fourth division, however the new club had a very similar logo and an identical name. As a result, Kujawiak, Zawisza and supporters all over the country boycotted the relocated team. The new Kujawiak/Zawisza club folded in 2007 as a result of serious corruption allegations and widespread condemnation.

The reserve team continued to play under the name Kujawiak Włocławek in the fourth division, but withdrew from all competitions at the end the 2007–08 season.

== Honours ==
- III liga
  - Champions: 2003–04
- Polish Cup
  - Quarter-finalists: 2005–06
- Polish Cup (Kuyavia regionals)
  - Winners: 2003–04

== See also ==
- Football in Poland
