= Unia Janikowo =

Polish football club

KS Unia Janikowo
- Full name: Klub Sportowy Unia Janikowo
- Nickname: Duma Kujaw (The Pride of Kuyavia)
- Founded: 21 November 1958; 67 years ago (as MLKS Unia); 28 January 2013; 13 years ago (refounded as KS Unia)
- Dissolved: March 2023; 3 years ago
- Ground: Municipal Stadium
- Capacity: 4,500
- Website: http://ks-unia.futbolowo.pl/
Home colours	Away colours

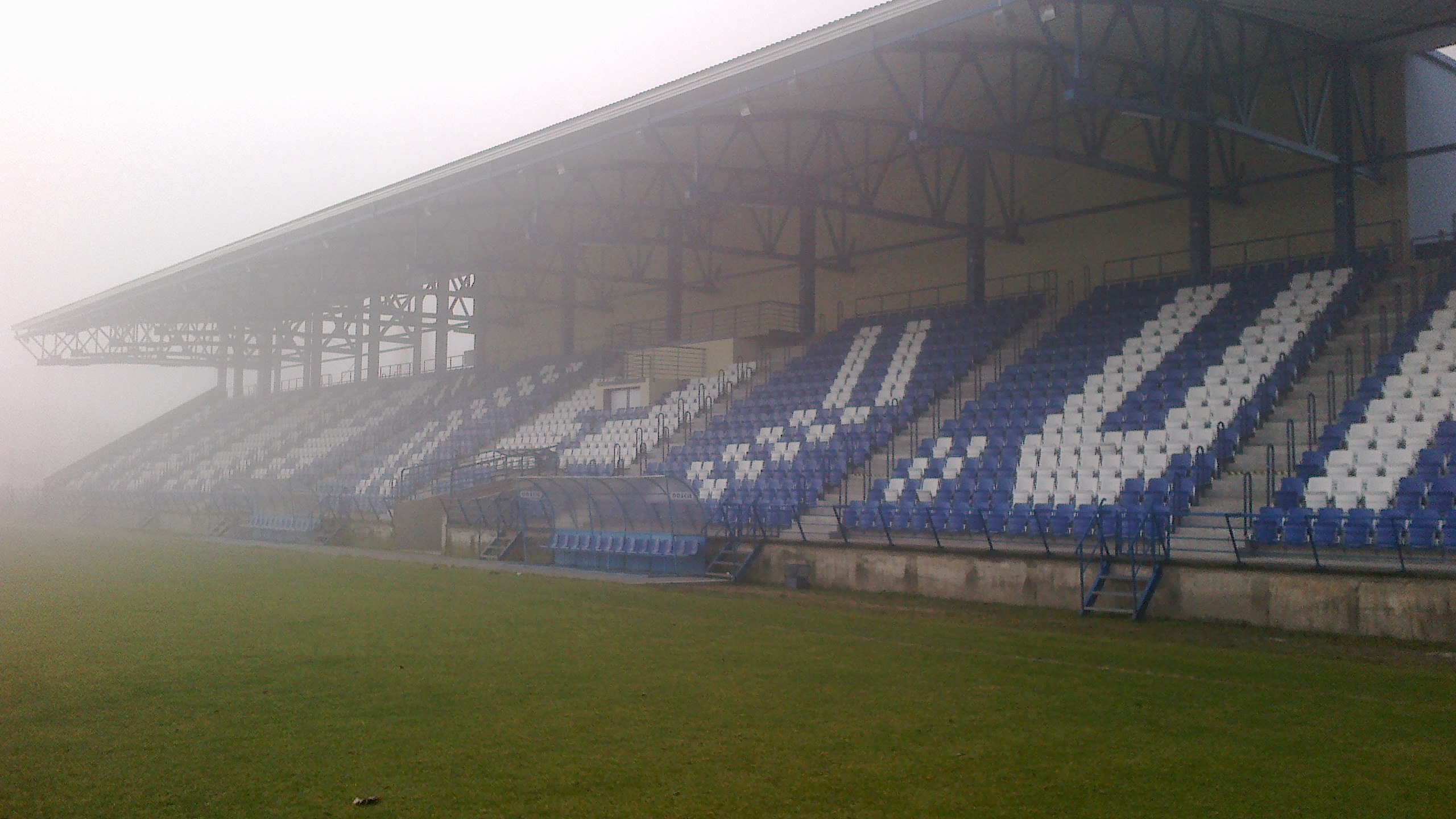
Stadion Miejski (Janikowo)

KS Unia Janikowo was a Polish football club based in Janikowo, founded in 1958.

After disbanding in 2012, they were refounded in January 2013. In March 2023, Unia withdrew from the 2022–23 III liga and ceased all activity after declaring bankruptcy.

In 2024, a phoenix club named MKS Janikowo was established. In July 2025, it was renamed to MKS Unia, and changed its crest and colours to match the dissolved Unia.
