= Balice, Kuyavian–Pomeranian Voivodeship =

Balice
- Location within Poland
- Coordinates: 52°43′7″N 18°9′12″E
- Country: Poland
- Voivodeship: Kuyavian–Pomeranian
- County: Inowrocław
- District: Janikowo

Area
  - Total: 177.29 ha (438.1 acres)
  - Urban: 2.11 ha (5.2 acres)
  - Road: 4.38 ha (10.8 acres)
  - Forest: 0.36 ha (0.89 acres)

Population (March 2011)
  - Total: 124
  - Density: 69.9/km^{2} (181/sq mi)
- Time zone: UTC+1 (CET)
  - Summer (DST): UTC+2 (CEST)
- Postal code: 21-400
- Telephone code: 52
- Vehicle registration: CIN
- SIMC: 0086349

Balice, historically also known as Balycze and Balicze, is a Polish village in Gmina Janikowo.

Owned by unknown noblemen since at least 1411, it was sold in 1464 along with nearby villages Kołuda Mała, Sielec, part of Sieczkowice and Lake Krzyte for 40 grzywnas of grosz's.

Between 1975 and 1998, it was in the Bydgoszcz Voivodeship.
