= 2005–06 Polish Basketball League =

The 2005–06 Polish Basketball League was the 78th edition of the top basketball league of Poland.

== Teams ==
Anwil Włocławek	Włocławek
Astoria Bydgoszcz	Bydgoszcz
AZS Gaz Ziemny Koszalin	Koszalin
Energa Czarni Słupsk	Słupsk
Era Śląsk Wrocław	Wrocław
Gipsar Stal Ostrów Wielkopolski	Ostrów Wielkopolski
SKK Kotwica Kołobrzeg	Kołobrzeg
Noteć Inowrocław	Inowrocław
KS Polonia SPEC Warsaw	Warsaw
Polpak Świecie	Świecie
Polpharma Starogard Gdański	Starogard Gdański
SSA Prokom Trefl Sopot	Sopot
KS Turów Zgorzelec	Zgorzelec
Unia Tarnów	Tarnów

== League table ==
Pos	Team	Pld	W	L	PF	PA	PD	GAvg	Pts
1	Prokom Trefl	26	22	4	2305	1954	+351	1.18	48
2	Anwil	26	17	9	2064	1848	+216	1.12	43
3	Polpak	26	16	10	2061	1993	+68	1.03	42
4	Energa Czarni	26	16	10	2004	1845	+159	1.09	42
5	Era Śląsk	26	15	11	1997	1944	+53	1.03	41
6	Stal	26	14	12	2108	2003	+105	1.05	40
7	BOT Turów	26	14	12	2245	2068	+177	1.09	40
8	Polpharma	26	14	12	2058	1962	+96	1.05	40
9	AZS	26	12	14	2273	2331	−58	0.98	38
10	Astoria	26	12	14	2109	2157	−48	0.98	38
11	Polonia	26	12	14	2040	2016	+24	1.01	38
12	DGP Azoty	26	10	16	2016	2171	−155	0.93	36
13	Kotwica	26	8	18	1923	2094	−171	0.92	34
14	Noteć	26	0	26	1763	2580	−817	0.68	26

== Ineligible for playoffs ==
Pos	Team	Pld	W	L	PF	PA	PD	GAvg	Pts
9	Astoria	29	15	14	2413	2427	−14	0.99	44
10	Polonia	29	14	15	2293	2269	+24	1.01	43
11	AZS	29	13	16	2567	2593	−26	0.99	42
12	DGP Azoty	29	12	17	2330	2456	−126	0.95	41
13	Kotwica	29	9	20	2169	2346	−177	0.92	38
14	Noteć	29	0	29	2033	2939	−906	0.69	29

== Playoffs ==
QUARTERFINALS
(1) Prokom Trefl Sopot 3

91:76 (April 18 18:00 Sopot)
80:60 (April 19 18:00 Sopot)
85:93 (April 22 17:00 Starogard)
(8) Polpharma Starogard Gd. 0
_______________
(4) Energa Czarni Słupsk 3
67:70 (April 18 18:10 Słupsk)
70:62 (April 19 18:10 Słupsk)
78:81 (April 23 14:35 Wrocław)
67:69 (April 24 18:10 Wrocław)
(5) Era Śląsk Wrocław 1
_______________
(2) Anwil Włocławek 3
89:66 (April 18 18:30 Włocławek)
69:62 (April 19 18:30 Włocławek)
79:81 (April 22 18:30 Zgorzelec)
(7) Turów Zgorzelec 0
_______________
(3) Polpak Świecie 3
76:73 (April 18 18:30 Grudziądz)
95:63 (April 19 18:30 Grudziądz)
78:85 (April 22 18:00 Ostrów)
(6) Stal Ostrów Wlkp. 0

SEMIFINALS
Prokom Trefl Sopot 3

80:70 (April 28 18:00 Sopot)
73:57 (April 30 18:30 Sopot)
61:77 (May 3 18:30 Słupsk)
Czarni Słupsk 0
_______________
Anwil Włocławek 3
86:58 (April 29 18:30 Włocławek)
78:61 (May 1 18:10 Włocławek)
71:87 (May 4 18:30 Grudziądz)
Polpak Świecie 0

FINAL
Prokom Trefl Sopot 4

88:72 (May 9 18:30 Sopot)
74:83 (May 11 18:15 Sopot)
64:66 (May 14 18:30 Włocławek)
53:84 (May 16 18:30 Włocławek)
89:62 (May 19 18:30 Sopot)
Anwil Włocławek 1

FOR 3RD PLACE
Polpak Świecie 0 (-16)
60:68 (May 13, 2006 18:30 Grudziądz)
79:71 (May 17, 2006 18:00 Słupsk)
Energa Czarni Słupsk 2 (+16)

1. Prokom Trefl Sopot
2. Anwil Włocławek
3. Energa Czarni Słupsk
4. KS Polpak Świecie
5. Era Śląsk Wrocław
6. Stal Ostrów Wielkopolski
7. BOT KS Turów Zgorzelec
8. Polpharma Starogard Gdański
9. Astoria Bydgoszcz
10. Polonia SPEC Warsaw
11. AZS Gaz Ziemny Koszalin
12. DGP Azoty Unia Tarnów
13. SKK Kotwica Kołobrzeg
14. Noteć Inowrocław
