= Głogowiec =

Głogowiec or Głogówiec may refer to the following places:

- Głogowiec, Kutno County in Łódź Voivodeship (central Poland)
- Głogowiec, Łęczyca County in Łódź Voivodeship (central Poland)
- Głogowiec, Łódź East County in Łódź Voivodeship (central Poland)
- Głogowiec, Poddębice County in Łódź Voivodeship (central Poland)
- Głogowiec, Subcarpathian Voivodeship (south-east Poland)
- Głogówiec, Kuyavian-Pomeranian Voivodeship (north-central Poland)
