= Balice =

Balice may refer to:

- John Paul II International Airport Kraków–Balice, airport serving Kraków, Poland
- Balice, Cuiavian-Pomeranian Voivodeship, Central Poland
- Balice, Lesser Poland Voivodeship, south Poland
- Balice, Świętokrzyskie Voivodeship, south-central Poland
- Balychi, Lviv Oblast, western Ukraine
