= The Ohio Company: Its Inner History =

1959 book by Alfred P. James

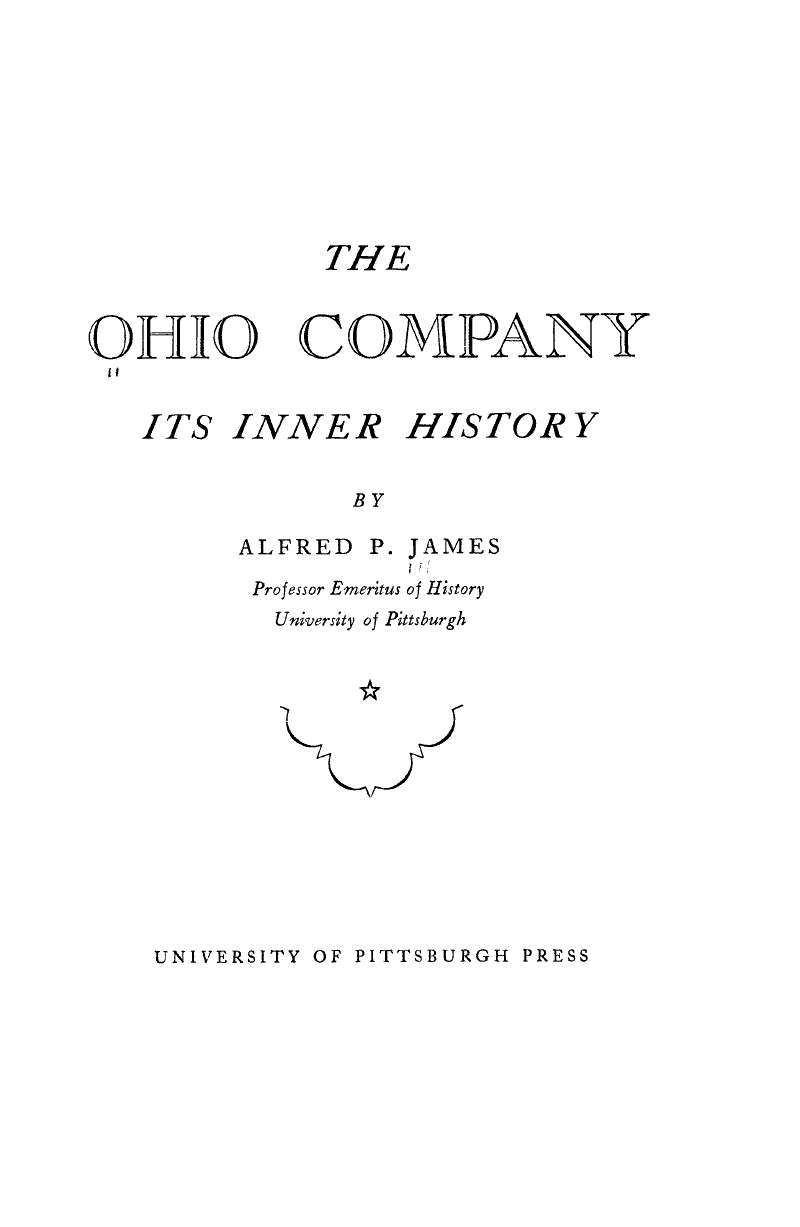
- Title page to The Ohio Company: Its Inner History, 1959
- Author: Alfred P. James
- Language: English
- Subject: The Ohio Company
- Publisher: University of Pittsburgh Press
- Publication date: 1959
- Publication place: United States
- Pages: 375
- ISBN: 978-0-8229-8354-5
- OCLC: 250855838

The Ohio Company: Its Inner History is a 1959 book by Alfred P. James that chronicles the Ohio Company of Virginia from its informal organization before October 1747 to its terminus no earlier than October 1821.

== Background ==
Though "many" documents related to the Ohio Company of Virginia burned in fires, such as that at Williamsburg, Virginia, in 1781, and at Richmond, Virginia, in 1865, documents in private ownership, institutional depositories, and those as public record survived, incorporated to works such as Berthold Fernow's 1890 The Ohio Valley in Colonial Days and Kenneth P. Bailey's 1939 The Ohio Company of Virginia. From Christopher Gists Journals with Historical, Geographical and Ethnological Notes and Biographies of his Contemporaries, readers might have implied its author, William Darlington (1782–1863), owned "important" Ohio Company papers. Darlington's descendants donated his library to the University of Pittsburgh in 1918 and his family's estate to the university in 1925. In a joint editorship, Louis Mulkearn reviewed Ohio Company papers from the Darlington estate, while James collected materials from other sources.

Between 1907–1910, James served as a Rhodes scholar before he graduated with a Bachelor and a Master of Arts from Oxford University in 1910 and 1915, respectively. Prior to his tenure at the University of Pittsburgh (1918–1956), where he received full professorship in 1924, the same year in which he earned a Doctor of Philosophy from the University of Chicago, James instructed history at Ohio Wesleyan University from 1916–1917 and taught at the University of Arkansas from 1917–1918. Prior to publishment of The Ohio Company: Its Inner History, James compiled documents related to John Forbes, published as Writings of General John Forbes, Relating to His Service in North America in 1938, and wrote on the 1758 British capture of Fort Duquesne for its bicentennial in Drums in the Forest.

== Summary ==
Traits common to human nature, desires for prestige, power, and economic security, though not instinctual, led to the formation of the Ohio Company. Specific to America, Maryland and Virginia families such as the Fairfaxes and Calverts may have provided inspiration for persons who acted in the Company. In what John Robert Seeley calls "The Second Hundred Years" between France and England, which he estimated spanned from 1689 to 1815, international questions arose, such as if seventeenth-century international law gave the discoverer of a river's mouth ownership over the basin drained by it and if Iroquois natives held land titles over the land they controlled, which "gravely affected" its policies and positions. Undeveloped American questions included trade with Indians and territorial conflicts among British colonies, and white westward expansion.

With the signature of the Treaty of Lancaster on July 2, 1744, the Iroquois renounced their claim to all lands within the Virginia colony and recognized the King of Britain's right to all lands thereto, which dangled a "tempting bait" to politicians and land speculators in Virginia. Though impossible to date, the Ohio Company formed, possibly after years of discussion, before October 20, 1747, the date on which Thomas Lee and eleven others petitioned the Governor and Council of Virginia for a grant of 200,000 acres. The colonial Virginian government, after reception of instructions for petition allocation from London, secured by John Hanbury, the company's unofficial London factor, approved the company's grant on July 12 or 13th, 1749.

== Reception ==
Clarence E. Carter of The American Historical Review summarized that "James ... centered his interest on the Company's inner history" without "neglecting other aspects", and noted James' work as the first instance to see the Ohio Company as a commercial organization in addition to a land company; similarly, Richard L. Morton of The William and Mary Quarterly stated the book presented a "new light" on the company, "especially on its business transactions".

Due to the book's restricted point of view, John D. Barnhart of The Mississippi Valley Historical Review recommended it be read in tandem with Bailey's The Ohio Company.

== Works cited ==
- Gates, Paul W. (January 1960). "The Ohio Company: Its Inner History. By Alfred P. James". Pennsylvania History: A Journal of Mid-Atlantic Studies. 27 (1): 114–116.
- Horsman, Reginald (December 1959). "Book Reviews: The Ohio Company: Its Inner History. By Alfred P. James". Indiana Magazine of History. 55 (4): 397–398. JSTOR 27788733. (subscription required)
- James, Alfred P. (1959). The Ohio Company: Its Inner History. University of Pittsburgh Press.
- Leder, Lawrence H. (Summer 1960). "The Ohio Company: Its Inner History. By Alfred P. James". The Business History Review. 34 (2): 270–271. doi:10.2307/3111565. JSTOR 3111565. (subscription required)
- Mays, David J. (January 1960). "Book Reviews: The Ohio Company: Its Inner History. By Alfred P. James". The Virginia Magazine of History and Biography. 68 (1): 113. JSTOR 4246621. (subscription required)
- Tolles, Frederick B. (October 1959). "Book Reviews: The Ohio Company: Its Inner History. By Alfred P. James". The Pennsylvania Magazine of History and Biography. 83 (4): 459–461.
