= Antoni Chruściel =

Polish military officer (1895–1960)

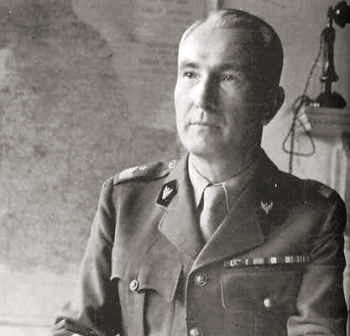
- Chruściel in the United Kingdom
- Born: 16 July 1895; Gniewczyna Łańcucka, Austria-Hungary
- Died: 30 November 1960 (aged 65); Washington, D.C., USA
- Military career
- Service years: 1914–1948
- Rank: Brigadier General
- Nickname: Monter
- Unit: Warsaw Corps of the Home Army
- Conflicts: World War I World War II: Polish Defensive War; Warsaw Uprising
- Awards: Virtuti Militari III class Virtuti Militari IV class Virtuti Militari V class Krzyż Walecznych
- Other work: Lawyer and translator

Gen. Antoni Chruściel ([anˈtɔɲi ˈxruɕt͡ɕel] nom de guerre Monter; 16 July 1895 – 30 November 1960) was a Polish military officer and a general of the Polish Army. He is best known as the de facto commander of all the armed forces of the Warsaw Uprising of 1944, as well as Home Army's chief of staff.

== Early life ==
Antoni Chruściel was born on 16 July 1895 in the village of Gniewczyna Łańcucka halfway between Łańcut and Przeworsk, to Andrzej Chruściel, a local farmer and the vogt of that village. In 1909, while still a student at a local gymnasium in Jarosław, Chruściel joined the secret scouting troop; he was also active in the Zarzewie movement. In 1914, after the outbreak of the First World War he moved to Lwów, where he joined the Eastern Legion. Soon afterwards, as a citizen of Austria-Hungary, he was drafted into the Austro-Hungarian Army. After graduating from an NCO school in May 1915 he served at various posts, including his service as a commanding officer of a company of the 90th Infantry Regiment. After the dissolution of Austria-Hungary and the chaos at the eastern front, Chruściel's regiment was the only unit in the entire Austro-Hungarian Army to return to the barracks as an organized entity and with arms. Few weeks later Chruściel, together with most of his unit, joined the newly formed Polish Army.

== Before World War II ==
During the Polish–Bolshevik War Chruściel continued his NCO career in the 14th Infantry Regiment (formed mostly of the former 90th Regiment of the Austro-Hungarian Army), as the commanding officer of the 5th company. In January 1922 he became the commanding officer of the 1st Battalion of that unit, after which in October 1922 he was transferred to the Lwów-based 42nd Infantry Regiment, where he served as the commanding officer of the 3rd and then 6th company. At the same time he studied law at the Lwów University. Transferred to the Cadet Corps, in 1931 he graduated from the Higher War School in Warsaw and became a professor in the Infantry Training Centre in Rembertów. In October 1934 he became the head of the Tactics Department of the War School in Warsaw. In January 1937 he started his service with the 40th Infantry Regiment as the deputy commanding officer. After finishing his practice with that unit, in March 1938 Chruściel became the commanding officer of the famed 82nd Siberian Infantry Regiment stationed in Brest-Litovsk as part of Gen. Cehak's 30th Infantry Division.

== World War II ==
Chruściel's regiment was secretly mobilised between 23 and 27 March 1939, and moved to the village of Szczerców where it formed a defensive line at the Widawka River. After the outbreak of the Polish Defensive War of 1939 it entered combat on 2 September. As part of the Piotrków Operational Group of the Łódź Army, Chruściel's unit retreated towards the Modlin Fortress and took part in its defence until the capitulation of the Polish units in the area. Interned in the POW camp in Działdowo, he was released in late October, already after the end of hostilities. Fearing that his release from the prison camp was a mistake, Chruściel moved to Warsaw, where he settled under a variety of false names. In June 1940 he joined the Union of Armed Struggle (ZWZ) underground organization. Initially head of the 3rd division of its staff, responsible for training and tactics, since October of that year Chruściel held the post of deputy commander of the City of Warsaw ZWZ region.

== Uprising ==
On 31 July 1944, the Polish commanders General Bór-Komorowski and Colonel Antoni Chruściel ordered full mobilization of Home Army forces for 17:00 the following day. Chruściel (codename "Monter") commanded the Polish forces in Warsaw. Initially he divided his forces into eight areas. On 20 September, they were reorganized to align with the three areas of the city held by Polish forces. The entire force, renamed the Warsaw Home Army Corps (Polish: Warszawski Korpus Armii Krajowej) and commanded by General Antoni Chruściel—promoted from Colonel on 14 September—formed into three infantry divisions (Śródmieście, Żoliborz and Mokotów). Upon the defeat of the Uprising, Chruściel was captured and sent to a German POW camp where he remained until his liberation by the Americans in May 1945.

== Post Uprising ==
After the Uprising, Antoni Chruściel was taken prisoner of war by the Germans and interned in the camps of Stalag XIII-D in Langwasser near Nuremberg and then the famous Oflag IV-C in Colditz Castle. Liberated by the Americans in May 1945, Chruściel joined the Polish II Corps and served in the Polish Army in the West until it was demobilized by the British in 1948. Although initially Chruściel planned to return to Soviet-held Poland, he was deprived of Polish citizenship by the Communist authorities of Poland and had to remain in exile. Upon demobilization he settled in London. In 1956 he moved to Washington, D.C., where he continued his work as a translator and lawyer. There he died on 30 November 1960. On the insistence of the local Polish community, he was buried in the Polish church in Doylestown, Pennsylvania.

In 1971, over 10 years after Chruściel's death, the communist government lifted their decree of 1946; the decision, however, was never made public. After the end of communist rule and the end of Soviet domination of Poland, the veterans of the Warsaw Uprising decided to bring back the ashes of their commander to Warsaw. On 30 July 2004, on the eve of the 60th anniversary of the Uprising, Antoni Chruściel and his wife Waleria were given a state funeral at Warsaw's Powązki Military Cemetery.

== Ranks ==
- Podporucznik (Second lieutenant)
- Kapitan (Captain)
- Major (Major)
- Podpułkownik (Lieutenant colonel)
- Pułkownik (Colonel)
- Generał brygady (Brigadier general)

== Honours and awards ==
- Knight's Cross of Order of Virtuti Militari (5 June 1947)
- Gold Cross (28 September 1939)
- Silver Cross (1921, No. 2371)
- Grand Cross of the Order of Polonia Restituta (posthumously August 2, 2009)
- Officer's Cross of the Order of Polonia Restituta
- Cross of Independence
- Cross of Valour – four times (1922 and 28 September 1944)
- Golden Cross of Merit
- Medal of Ten Years of Regained Independence
- Commemorative Medal for War 1918–1921
- Cross of the Home Army
- Bronze Medal for Long Service
- Golden Medal of Military Valor
- Bronze Medal of Military Valor- twice
- Yser Medal (Belgium)
- Karl Troop Cross (Austria-Hungary)
- Medal for Bravery- twice (Austria-Hungary)
