= Janikowo =

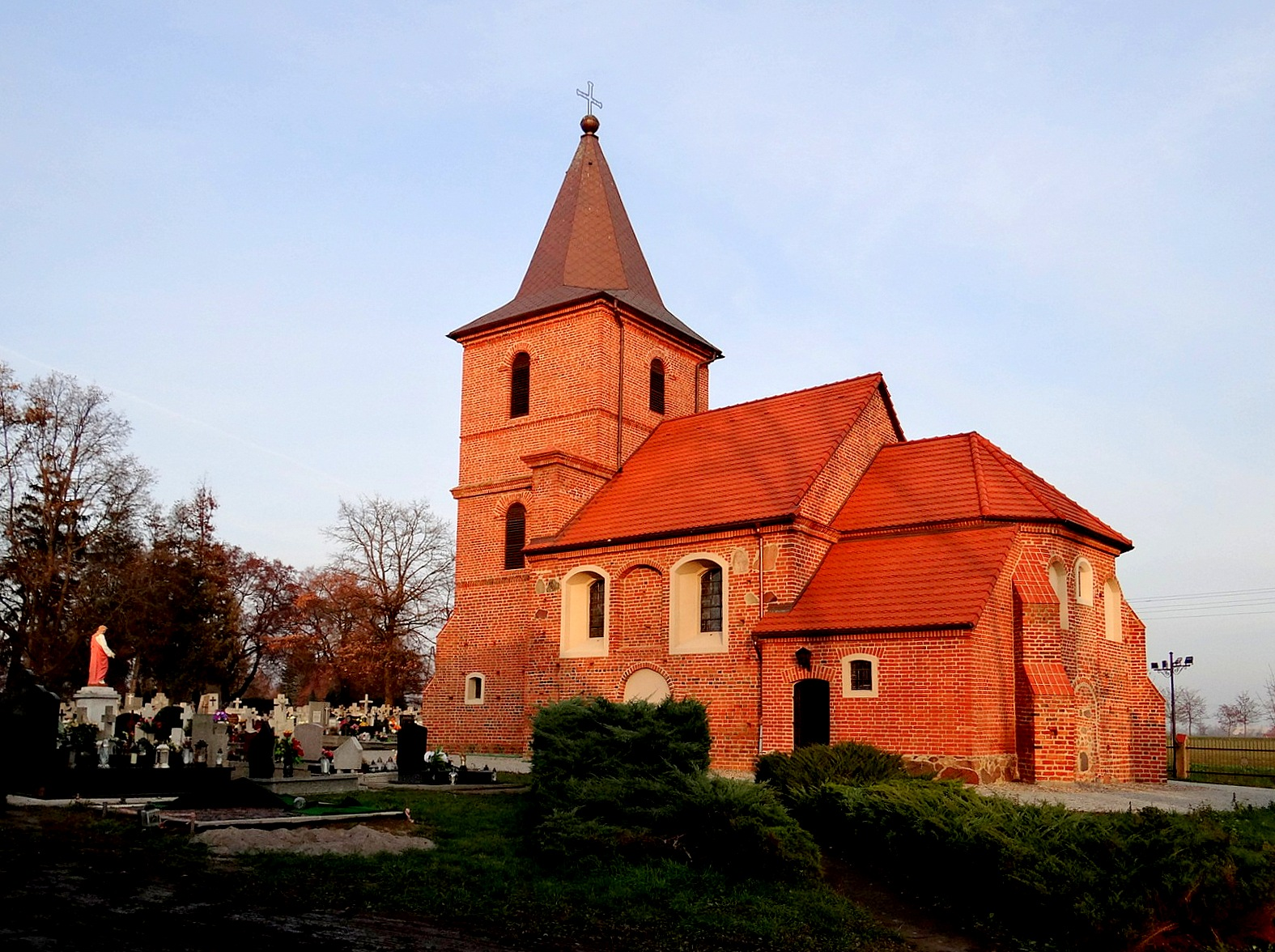
- John the Baptist Church

- Coat of arms

- Location within Poland
- Coordinates: 52°45′N 18°06′E
- Country: Poland
- Voivodeship: Kuyavian-Pomeranian
- County: Inowrocław
- Gmina: Janikowo

Area
  - Total: 9.51 km^{2} (3.67 sq mi)

Population (2025)
  - Total: 9,072
  - Density: 954/km^{2} (2,470/sq mi)
- Time zone: UTC+1 (CET)
  - Summer (DST): UTC+2 (CEST)
- Postal code: 88-160
- Vehicle registration: CIN
- Website: www.janikowo.com.pl

Janikowo [jaɲiˈkɔvɔ] (German: Amsee) is a town located in Inowrocław County, Kuyavian-Pomeranian Voivodeship, in north-central Poland. In 2004 had a population of 9,072. It is located in the historic region of Kuyavia.

== Sport ==
- Unia Janikowo - football club
