= Ludzisko =

- Village
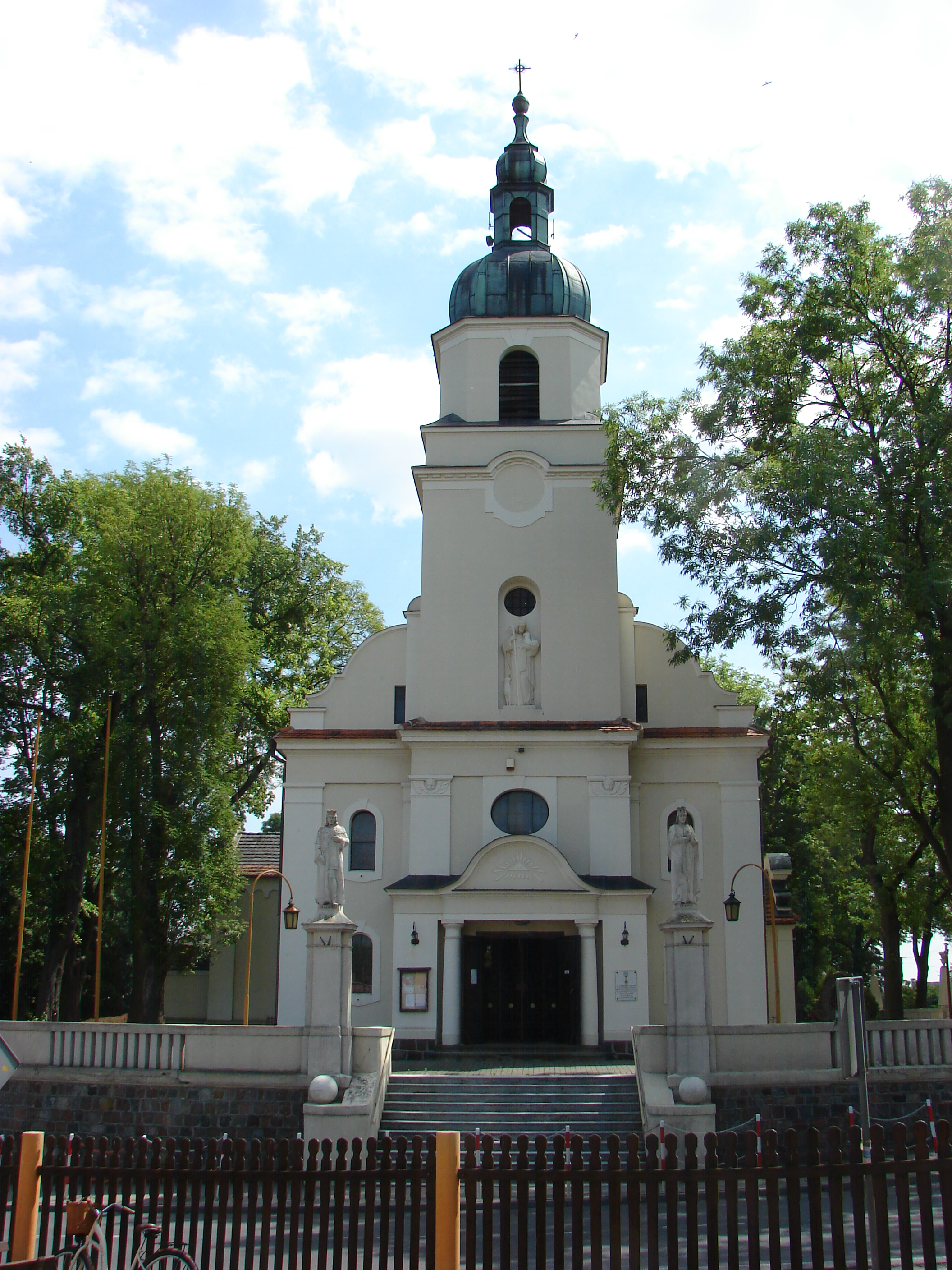
- Parish church of St Nicholas, built 1865.

- Location within Poland
- Coordinates: 52°44′N 18°10′E
- Country: Poland
- Voivodeship: Kuyavian-Pomeranian
- County: Inowrocław
- Gmina: Janikowo
- Website: LUDZISKO

Ludzisko [luˈd͡ʑiskɔ] is a village in the administrative district of Gmina Janikowo, within Inowrocław County, Kuyavian-Pomeranian Voivodeship, in north-central Poland.
