= Tryńcza =

- Village
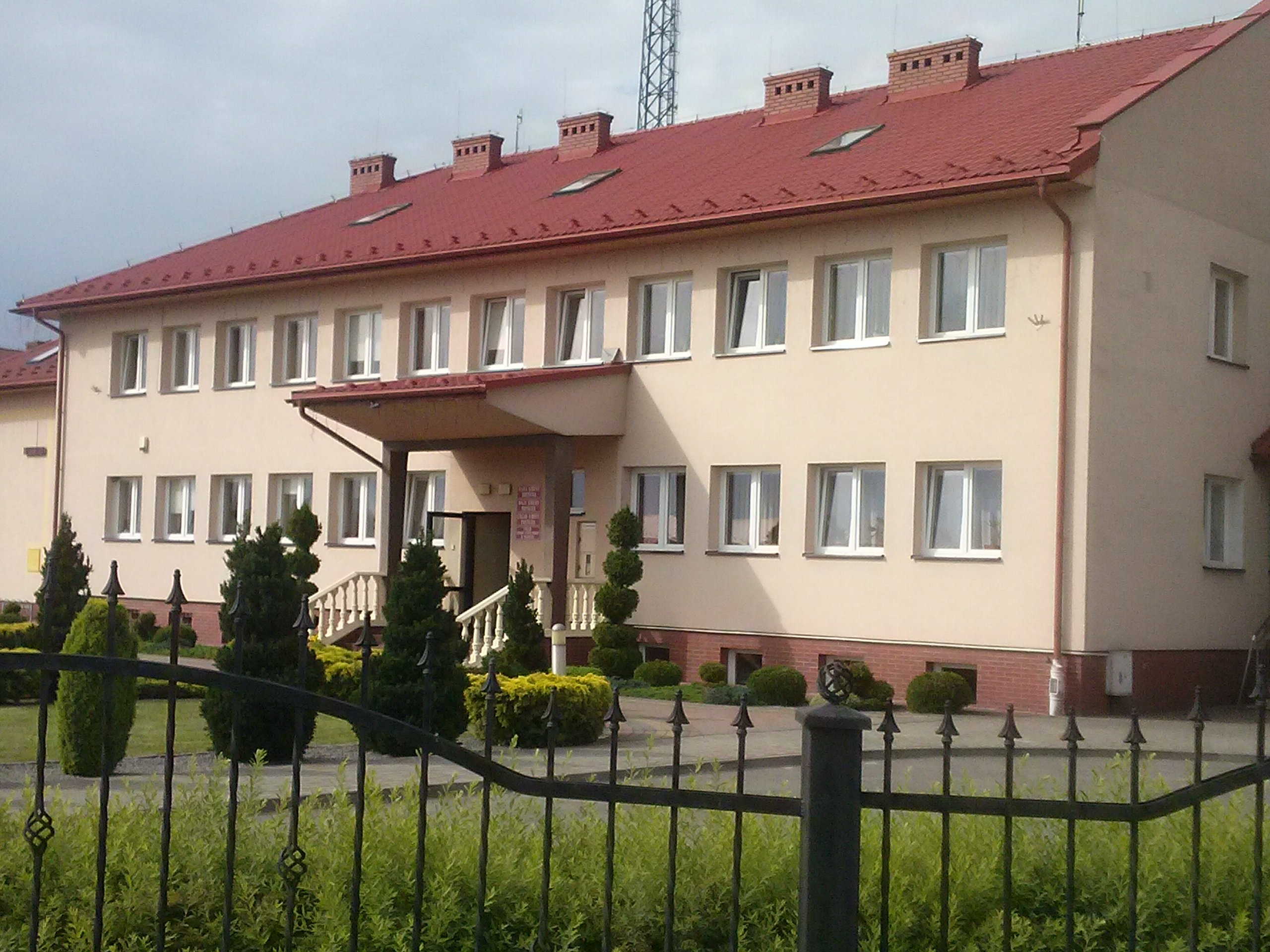
- Municipal office

- Location within Poland
- Coordinates: 50°10′N 22°34′E
- Country: Poland
- Voivodeship: Subcarpathian
- County: Przeworsk
- Gmina: Tryńcza

Population
  - Total: 1,305

Tryńcza [ˈtrɨɲt͡ʂa] is a village in Przeworsk County, Subcarpathian Voivodeship, in south-eastern Poland. It is the seat of the gmina (administrative district) called Gmina Tryńcza.
