= Gorzyce, Przeworsk County =

Gorzyce
- Village
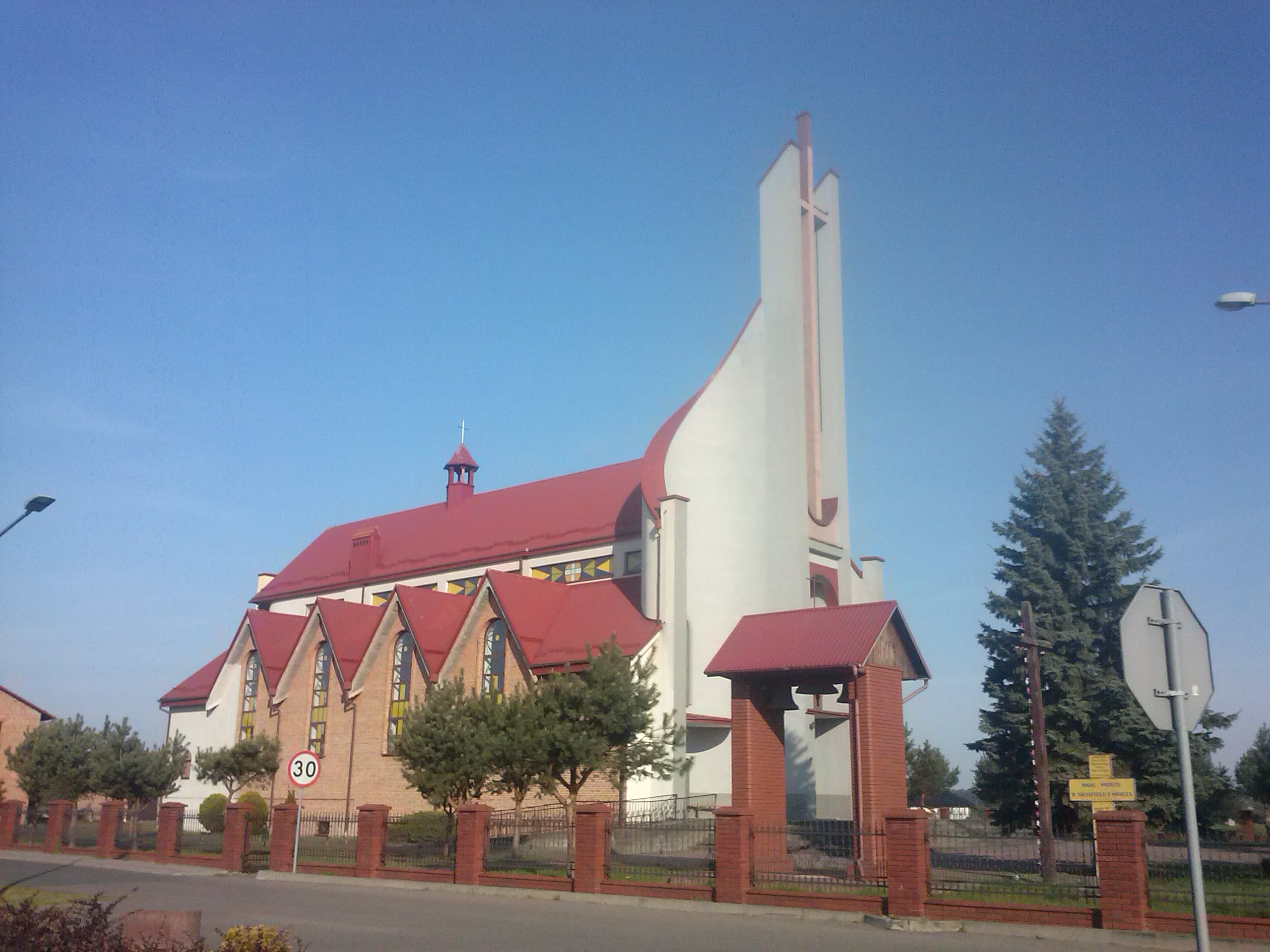
- Church of the Sacred Heart

- Location within Poland
- Coordinates: 50°7′47″N 22°34′42″E
- Country: Poland
- Voivodeship: Subcarpathian
- County: Przeworsk
- Gmina: Tryńcza

Population
  - Total: 1,282

Gorzyce [ɡɔˈʐɨt͡sɛ] is a village in the administrative district of Gmina Tryńcza, within Przeworsk County, Subcarpathian Voivodeship, in south-eastern Poland.
