= Gniewczyna Tryniecka =

- Village
- Location within Poland
- Coordinates: 50°6′N 22°30′E
- Country: Poland
- Voivodeship: Subcarpathian
- County: Przeworsk
- Gmina: Tryńcza

Gniewczyna Tryniecka ([ɡɲɛfˈt͡ʂɨna trɨˈɲɛt͡ska]) is a village in the administrative district of Gmina Tryńcza, within Przeworsk County, Subcarpathian Voivodeship, in south-eastern Poland.

== History ==
In 1942 Polish citizens of Gniewczyna Łęczycka and Gniewczyna Tryniecka detained and for several days tortured the remaining Jewish population of the village, before handing them over to the Germans for execution.
