= Ubieszyn =

- Village
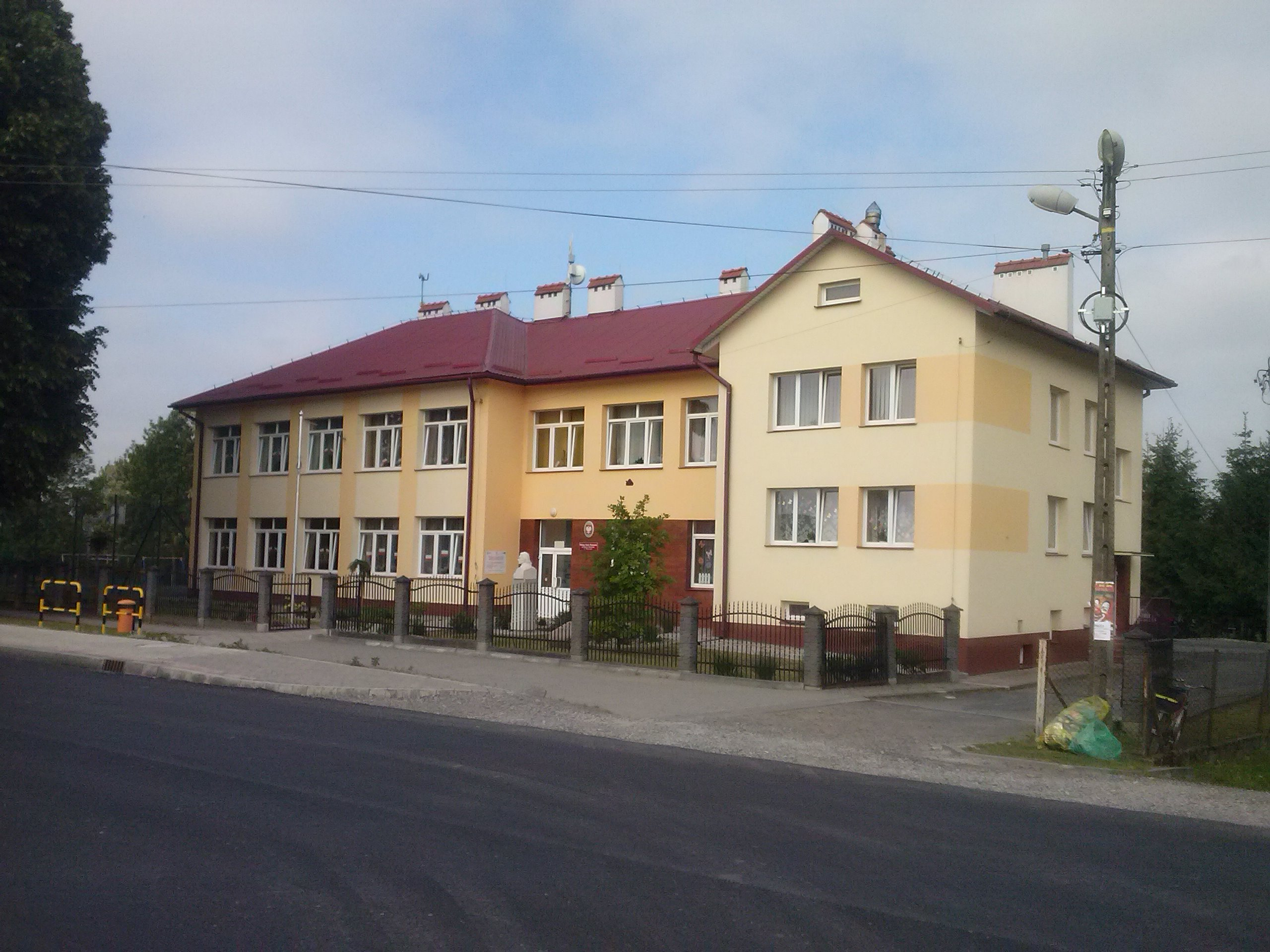
- Elementary school

- Location within Poland
- Coordinates: 50°10′N 22°35′E
- Country: Poland
- Voivodeship: Subcarpathian
- County: Przeworsk
- Gmina: Tryńcza

Ubieszyn [uˈbʲɛʂɨn] is a village in the administrative district of Gmina Tryńcza, within Przeworsk County, Subcarpathian Voivodeship, in south-eastern Poland.
