= Gmina Tryńcza =

Gmina Tryńcza Tryńcza Commune
- Gmina
- Flag Coat of arms
- Interactive map of Gmina Tryńcza
- Coordinates (Tryńcza): 50°10′N 22°34′E
- Country: Poland
- Voivodeship: Subcarpathian
- County: Przeworsk
- Seat: Tryńcza

Area
  - Total: 70.56 km^{2} (27.24 sq mi)

Population (2011)
  - Total: 8,324
  - Density: 118.0/km^{2} (305.5/sq mi)
- Website: http://www.tryncza.itl.pl

Gmina Tryńcza is a rural gmina (administrative district) in Przeworsk County, Subcarpathian Voivodeship, in south-eastern Poland. Its seat is the village of Tryńcza, which lies approximately 13 kilometres (8 mi) north-east of Przeworsk and 43 km (27 mi) east of the regional capital Rzeszów.

The gmina covers an area of 70.56 square kilometres (27.2 sq mi), and as of 2006 its total population is 8,186 (8,324 in 2011).

== Villages ==
Gmina Tryńcza contains the villages and settlements of Głogowiec, Gniewczyna Łańcucka, Gniewczyna Tryniecka, Gorzyce, Jagiełła, Tryńcza, Ubieszyn, Wólka Małkowa and Wólka Ogryzkowa.

== Neighbouring gminas ==
Gmina Tryńcza is bordered by the gminas of Białobrzegi, Grodzisko Dolne, Jarosław, Leżajsk, Przeworsk and Sieniawa.
