= Basilica Minor under the invocation of the Blessed Lady Mary in Inowrocław =

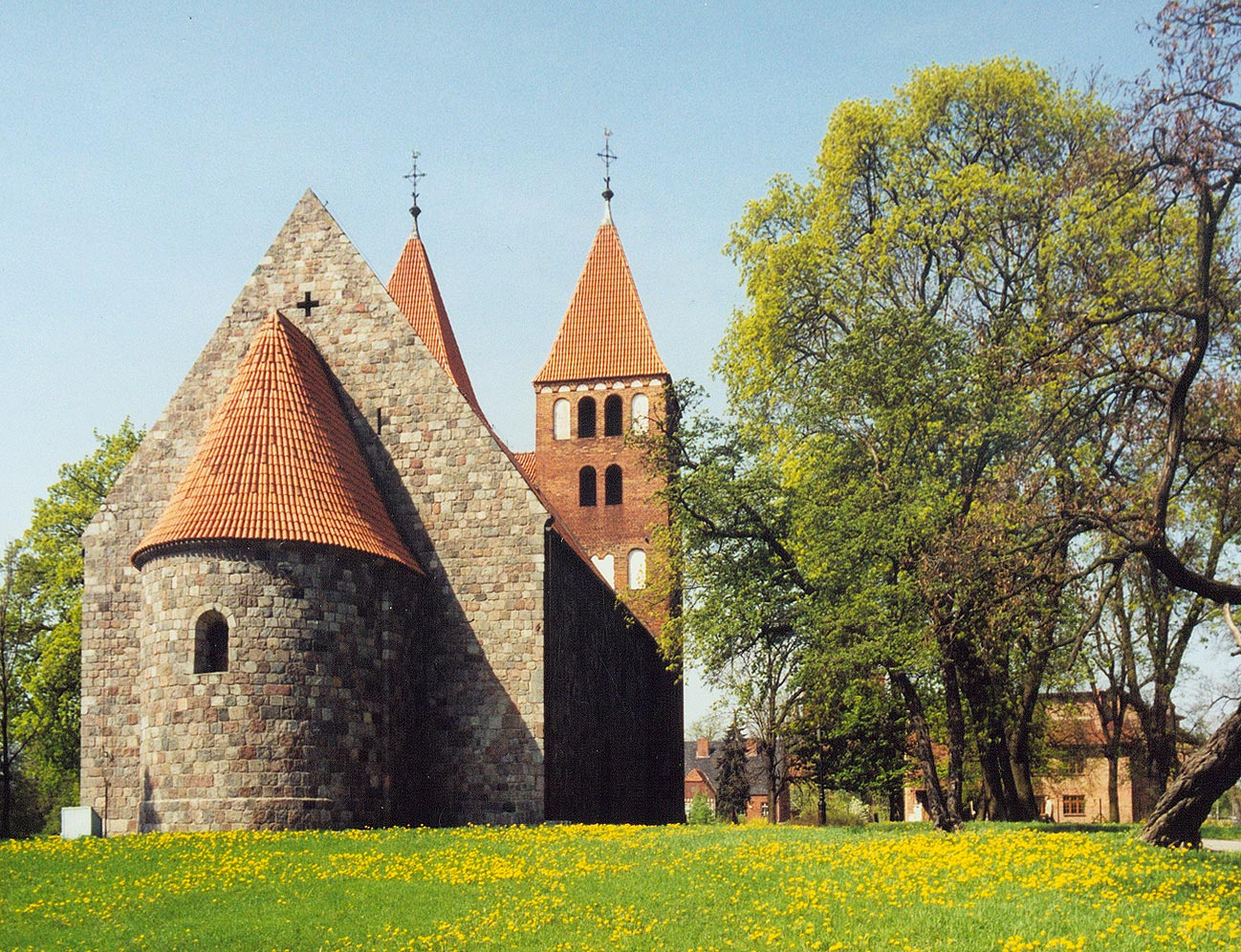
- (colloquially called 'The Ruin')
- Basilica Minor under the invocation of the Blessed Lady Mary in Inowrocław
- 52°48′0.27″N 18°15′48.77″E
- Location: Inowrocław
- Country: Poland
- Denomination: Roman catholic
- Religious institute: Catholic Church
- Website: www.imienia.pl

History
- Founded: 12th century
- Dedication: Blessed Lady Mary

Architecture
- Style: Romanesque
- Completed: 13th century

Administration
- Archdiocese: Roman Catholic Archdiocese of Gniezno

The church under the invocation of the Blessed Lady Mary in Inowrocław, so-called The Ruin – the oldest church in Inowrocław and one of the oldest in the Kuyavia region of Poland, dating back to the 12th century. It serves as a parish church. Since 2008 it holds the title of a minor basilica.

The church is under the ownership of the Parish of the invocation of the Blessed Lady Mary in Inowrocław.

== History ==
The church is standing on top of a morainic hill called Biała Góra (en. White Mountain) which holds evidence of settlement since the Roman era. It is surrounded by the remains of the oldest town cemetery (partially still intact). The emergence of the church is dated at late 12th or early 13th centuries. Neither the founder nor the exact time of building are known. The church was started being built most likely in the second half of the 12th century funded by duke Leszek, son of Bolesław IV the Curly, thanks to the salt mines profit. Rock nave and presbytery were built first. The foundations were intentionally laid on five symmetrical skeletons. Such undertaking was probably connected to the Christian relics cult intertwined with the contemporary pagan folk cult of a so-called 'building sacrifice'. Brick towers were built in the second phase of construction work at the beginning of the 13th century.

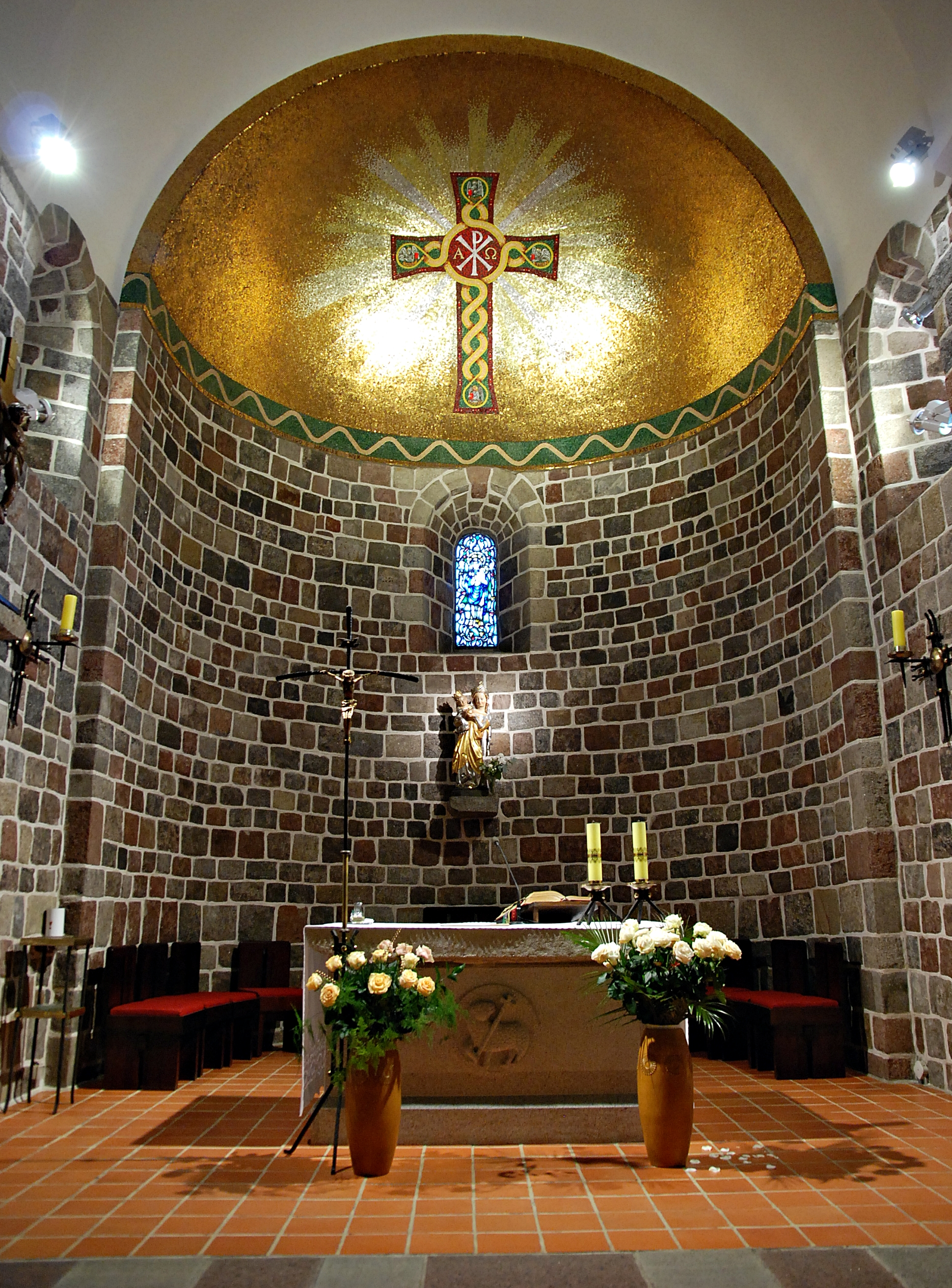
Presbytery

The biggest Central European basilica minor in the Romanesque style, oriented, made of granite bricks with higher parts of the towers made of regular brick. Aside from the religious purpose the building's defensive purpose is shown in the thickness of the walls (nearing 160cm), small highly situated windows, and shooting holes. Rectangular one nave corpus fits the small east-oriented presbytery enclosed by a semicircular apse. The western facade possesses two towers. The nave is covered by a flat wooden roof.
