= Gmina Janikowo =

Gmina Janikowo Janikowo Commune
- Gmina
- Coat of arms
- Interactive map of Gmina Janikowo
- Coordinates (Janikowo): 52°45′N 18°6′E
- Country: Poland
- Voivodeship: Kuyavian-Pomeranian
- County: Inowrocław
- Seat: Janikowo

Area
  - Total: 92.3 km^{2} (35.6 sq mi)

Population (2006)
  - Total: 13,635
  - Density: 148/km^{2} (383/sq mi)
  - Urban: 9,111
  - Rural: 4,524
- Website: https://www.janikowo.com.pl/

Gmina Janikowo is an urban-rural gmina (administrative district) in Inowrocław County, Kuyavian-Pomeranian Voivodeship, in north-central Poland. Its seat is the town of Janikowo, which lies approximately 12 kilometres (7 mi) south-west of Inowrocław, 42 km (26 mi) south of Bydgoszcz, and 47 km (29 mi) south-west of Toruń.

The gmina covers an area of 92.3 square kilometres (35.6 sq mi), and as of 2006 its total population is 13,635 (out of which the population of Janikowo amounts to 9,111, and the population of the rural part of the gmina is 4,524).

== Villages ==
Apart from the town of Janikowo, Gmina Janikowo contains the villages and settlements of Broniewice, Dobieszewice, Głogówiec, Góry, Kołodziejewo, Kołuda Mała, Kołuda Wielka, Ludzisko, Sielec and Trląg.

== Neighbouring gminas ==
Gmina Janikowo is bordered by the gminas of Dąbrowa, Inowrocław, Mogilno, Pakość and Strzelno.
