= Trląg =

- Village
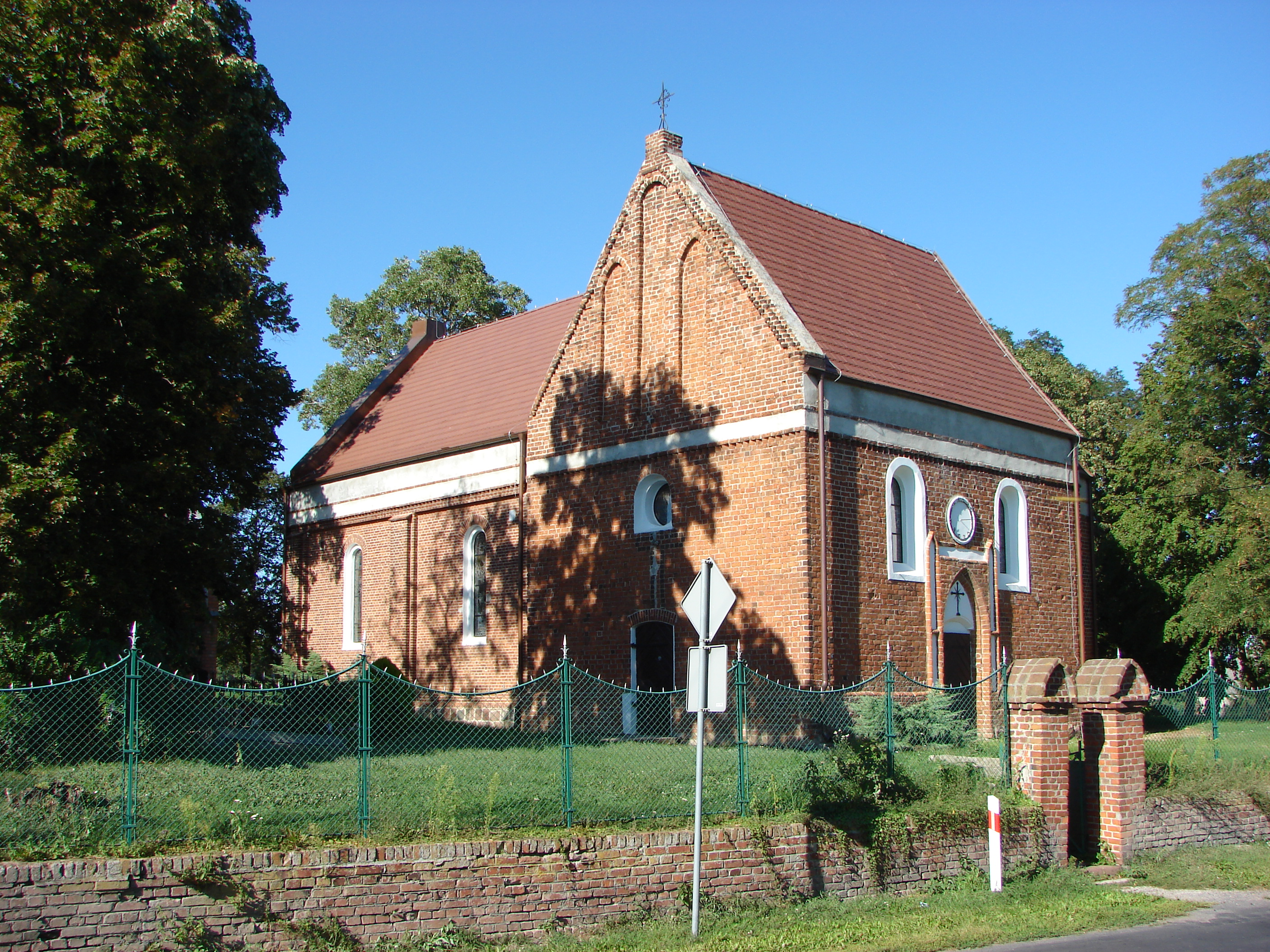
- Church of Saints Peter and Paul. Built in the second half of the 14th century.

- Location within Poland
- Coordinates: 52°43′N 18°6′E
- Country: Poland
- Voivodeship: Kuyavian-Pomeranian
- County: Inowrocław
- Gmina: Janikowo

Trląg [trlɔŋk] is a village in the administrative district of Gmina Janikowo, within Inowrocław County, Kuyavian-Pomeranian Voivodeship, in north-central Poland.
