= Dobieszewice =

- Village
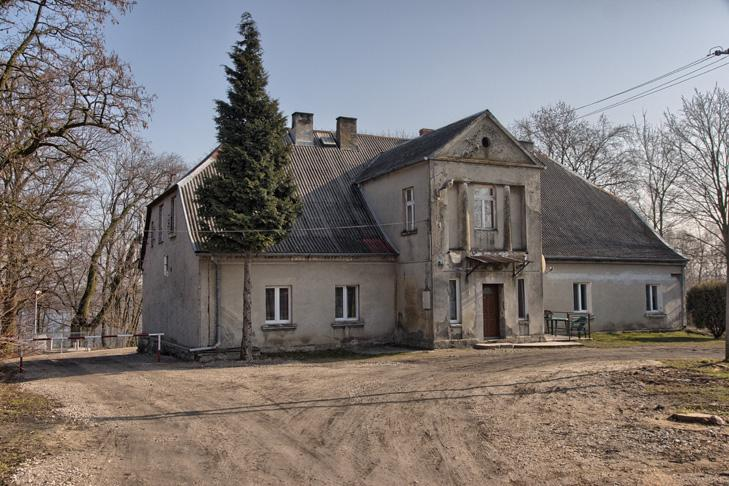

- Location within Poland
- Coordinates: 52°46′N 18°5′E
- Country: Poland
- Voivodeship: Kuyavian-Pomeranian
- County: Inowrocław
- Gmina: Janikowo

Dobieszewice [dɔbjɛʃɛˈvit͡sɛ] is a village in the administrative district of Gmina Janikowo, within Inowrocław County, Kuyavian-Pomeranian Voivodeship, in north-central Poland.
