= Góry, Kuyavian-Pomeranian Voivodeship =

Góry
- Village
- Location within Poland
- Coordinates: 52°42′N 18°8′E
- Country: Poland
- Voivodeship: Kuyavian-Pomeranian
- County: Inowrocław
- Gmina: Janikowo

Góry [ˈɡurɨ] is a village in the administrative district of Gmina Janikowo, within Inowrocław County, Kuyavian-Pomeranian Voivodeship, in north-central Poland.
