= Inowrocław Synagogue =

Destroyed synagogue in Inowrocław, Poland

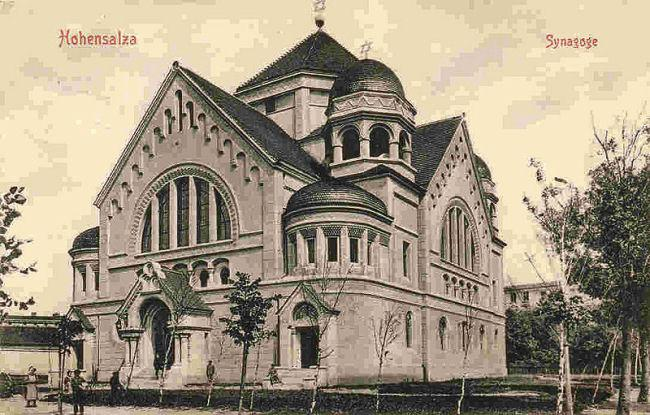
- The former synagogue, prior to 1918

- Location of the destroyed synagogue in Kuyavian-Pomeranian Voivodeship

Religion
- Affiliation: Reform Judaism (former)
- Ecclesiastical or organizational status: Synagogue (1908–1939)
- Status: Destroyed

Location
- Location: 64 Solankowa Street, Skwer Jan-Paweł II, Inowrocław, Kuyavian-Pomeranian Voivodeship
- Country: Poland
- Interactive map of Inowrocław Synagogue
- Coordinates: 52°47′42″N 18°14′46″E

Architecture
- Architect: J. Baumgarten
- Type: Synagogue architecture
- Style: Byzantine Revival
- Completed: 1908
- Destroyed: 1939

Specifications
- Dome: Five (maybe more)
- Materials: Brick

The Inowrocław Synagogue was a former Reform Jewish congregation and synagogue, that was located at 64 Solankowa Street, in what is now Skwer Jan-Paweł II, in Inowrocław, in the Kuyavian-Pomeranian Voivodeship of Poland. Designed in the Byzantine Revival style under the supervision of J. Baumgarten, and completed in 1908, the synagogue served as a house of prayer until World War II when it was destroyed by Nazis in 1939.

== History ==
The structure was built in 1908, with funds provided almost entirely by Leopold Levy. After Nazi Germany's invasion of Poland in 1939, the Nazis attempted to turn it into a bathhouse or swimming pool, but were unable to, so they destroyed the former synagogue.

"The new synagogue ... was one of the most beautiful in Europe, and maybe in the whole world. ... The emperor Wilhelm II was present at the ceremony of consecration. The synagogue stood in the most beautiful square in the city, in a beautiful garden, and was an amazing temple. The insite was rich with expensive mosaics, light, and the extraordinary ceiling, onto which the light from two high windows shone. Through one of the windows one could see the grandeur of God, through the ogher, the Star of David. The temple could be compared to the most beautiful in the world. Today, there is a rose garden in its place. The synagogue was ceremonially burnt down."

— Description from an unnamed source, 1941.

A statue of Jan Kasprowicz, a Polish literary figure who was born on the outskirts of the city in the village of Szymborze now occupies the site of the former synagogue. The adjacent square was renamed Skwer Jan-Paweł II, in honor of Pope John-Paul II.

Another synagogue in Inowrocław was located on Ulica Rzeźnicka. It was also demolished, believed to have occurred during the 1980s, and a private house now stands on the site of the former synagogue.

== See also ==
- History of the Jews in Poland
- List of active synagogues in Poland
