= Broniewice =

- Village
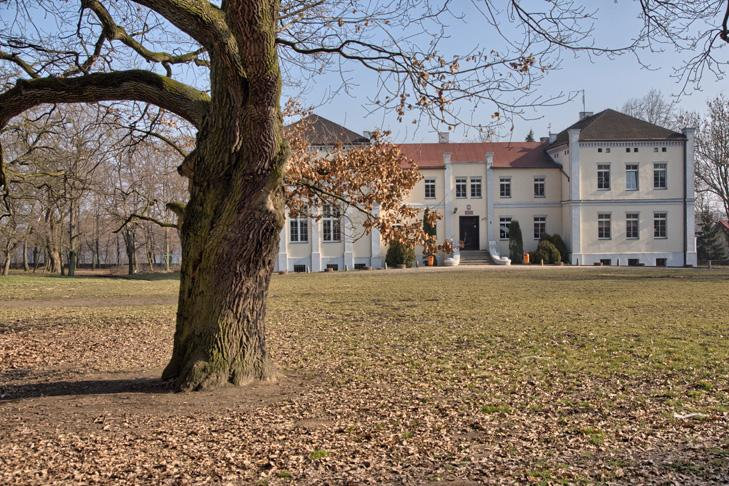
- Palace in Broniewice

- Location within Poland
- Coordinates: 52°44′40″N 18°5′4″E
- Country: Poland
- Voivodeship: Kuyavian-Pomeranian
- County: Inowrocław
- Gmina: Janikowo

Population (2022)
  - Total: 401
- Postal code: 88-160

Broniewice [brɔɲɛˈvit͡sɛ] is a village in the administrative district of Gmina Janikowo, within Inowrocław County, Kuyavian-Pomeranian Voivodeship, in north-central Poland.
