= Wólka Ogryzkowa =

- Village
- Location within Poland
- Coordinates: 50°8′N 22°34′E
- Country: Poland
- Voivodeship: Subcarpathian
- County: Przeworsk
- Gmina: Tryńcza

Wólka Ogryzkowa [ˈvulka ɔɡrɨsˈkɔva] is a village in the administrative district of Gmina Tryńcza, within Przeworsk County, Subcarpathian Voivodeship, in south-eastern Poland.
