= Kołodziejewo =

- Village
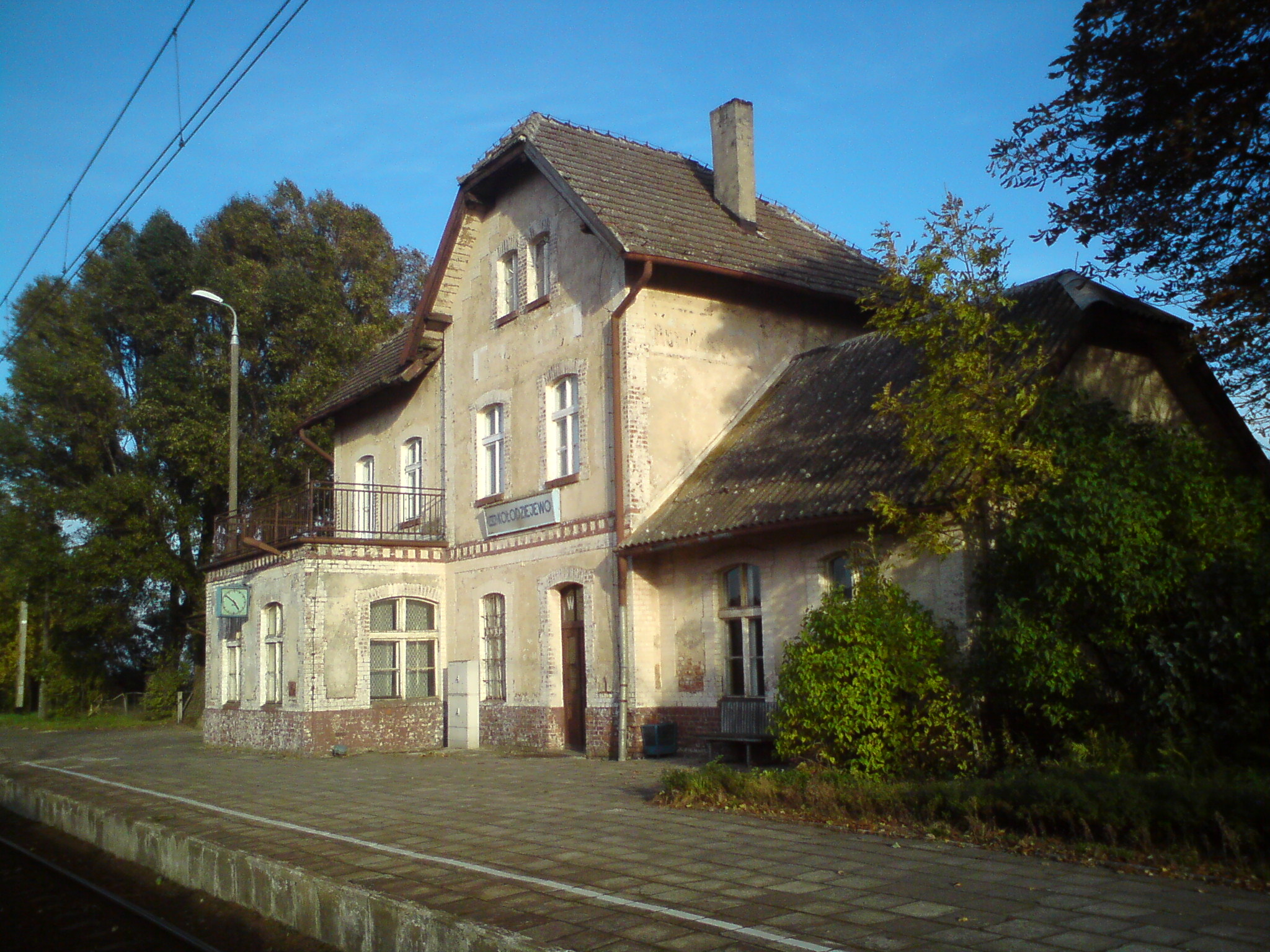

- Location within Poland
- Coordinates: 52°42′35″N 18°02′04″E
- Country: Poland
- Voivodeship: Kuyavian-Pomeranian
- County: Inowrocław
- Gmina: Janikowo
- Population: 808
- Website: http://www.janikowo.com.pl/pub/kolodziejewo

Kołodziejewo [kɔwɔd͡ʑɛˈjɛvɔ] is a village in the administrative district of Gmina Janikowo, within Inowrocław County, Kuyavian-Pomeranian Voivodeship, in north-central Poland.

== History ==
The first source mention of Kołodziejewo comes from 1379. There was a farm in the village. The town owes its development to the construction of the railway in 1872-1873. Passenger trains have stopped here since 1895. In 1905, a station was built, which still exists today and still serves its original function. The construction of the school was also completed in the same year. In 1908, an Evangelical church was built here, which now belongs to the Roman Catholic Church. From 1772 (1st partition of Poland) to March 6, 1919 and during the Nazi occupation of 1939-1945, Kołodziejewo had the German name Altraden.

== Monuments ==
According to the NID register of monuments, the manor complex, late 19th century, reg. no.: 186/A of January 15, 1986, is included in the list of monuments: manor house and park.

Additionally, in Kołodziejewo there is a church from 1908, a railway station from 1905 and residential buildings from the early 20th century.

=== Church ===
Parish of St. Joseph in Kołodziejewo.

The village lies within the boundaries of the Mogilno deanery in the Archdiocese of Gniezno.

The only church located in Kołodziejewo was built in 1908 by the German evangelical commune. It served the local population of the Evangelical denomination until the end of World War II (i.e. until 1945), when the German inhabitants left Kołodziejewo. Due to the above, the abandoned church was granted by the Commission for the Management of Abandoned Assets to the Roman Catholic parish. Saint Joseph as an "equivalent for war damage", because the construction of a separate Roman Catholic church was interrupted by the outbreak of World War II. A health center now stands on the site where a Catholic church was to be built.

The Evangelical Church after it was handed over to the parish of St. Saint Joseph has retained its original form to a large extent. Later, only some elements of the interior design changed, i.e. the canopy over the main altar was removed and the wooden pulpit located in the presbytery was removed. The interior is in neo-baroque style and presents solutions typical of the construction of evangelical churches (emporia along the nave).

The church houses a P.B. organ. Voelkner from Bydgoszcz, most likely built in the year the church was completed, i.e. in 1908. They are characterized by a decorative, gilded front with 27 pipes and 12 stops distributed between 2 manuals and a pedal, with a romantic character. The organ has a pneumatic actuation, 1 float bellows with the possibility of calibration and approximately 700 pipes.

== Economy and Communication ==
The village inhabitants live mainly from agriculture. However, since Kołodziejewo is a large village, there are also shops and companies here. In 2018, a Dino supermarket was opened in the village. The largest ones include a construction company employing several dozen people. There are also agritourism farms here.

=== Roads ===
The village is located between the towns of Mogilno and Janikowo. There is a road connecting these towns and surrounding villages. Most roads in the village have a paved surface.

=== Rail ===
Railway line No. 353 runs through Kołodziejewo with the Kołodziejewo station, connecting Poznań with Inowrocław and then Toruń and Bydgoszcz. Passenger connections are operated by POLREGIO. From the station you can reach: Bydgoszcz, Toruń, Inowrocław, Janikowo, Mogilno, Gniezno and Poznań. In 2015, the platform surfaces were replaced and the station was rebuilt to adapt it to current standards with facilities for disabled people. During the reconstruction of the station, the old buildings located next to the station building were demolished. Until August 2017, there were ticket offices in the building, but it is currently undeveloped - a general renovation and revitalization of the historic station is planned.

== Education ==
- Public Kindergarten in Kołodziejewo
- Primary School in the Name of Janusz Kusociński In Kołodziejewo

== Famous People From Kołodziejewo ==
Marian Kaiser (1933–1991) – speedway rider, team world champion in 1961 and Polish champion in 1957.

== Sport, Culture and Tourism ==
There is a football club KS "Piast" Kołodziejewo in the village. Currently he plays at the district level. The stadium in Kołodziejewo has a stand with about 150 seats (plastic chairs). The "ORLIK 2012" pitch was built here.

In Kołodziejewo, residents have sports facilities, a library and a village community center at their disposal. There are agritourism farms here. Not far from the village there is the Mieruciński forest, which is part of the Gołąbki forest district and the Mierucinek forest district.
