= Wólka Małkowa =

- Village
- Location within Poland
- Coordinates: 50°8′N 22°31′E
- Country: Poland
- Voivodeship: Subcarpathian
- County: Przeworsk
- Gmina: Tryńcza

Wólka Małkowa [ˈvulka mau̯ˈkɔva] is a village in the administrative district of Gmina Tryńcza, within Przeworsk County, Subcarpathian Voivodeship, in south-eastern Poland.
