= Jagiełła =

- Village
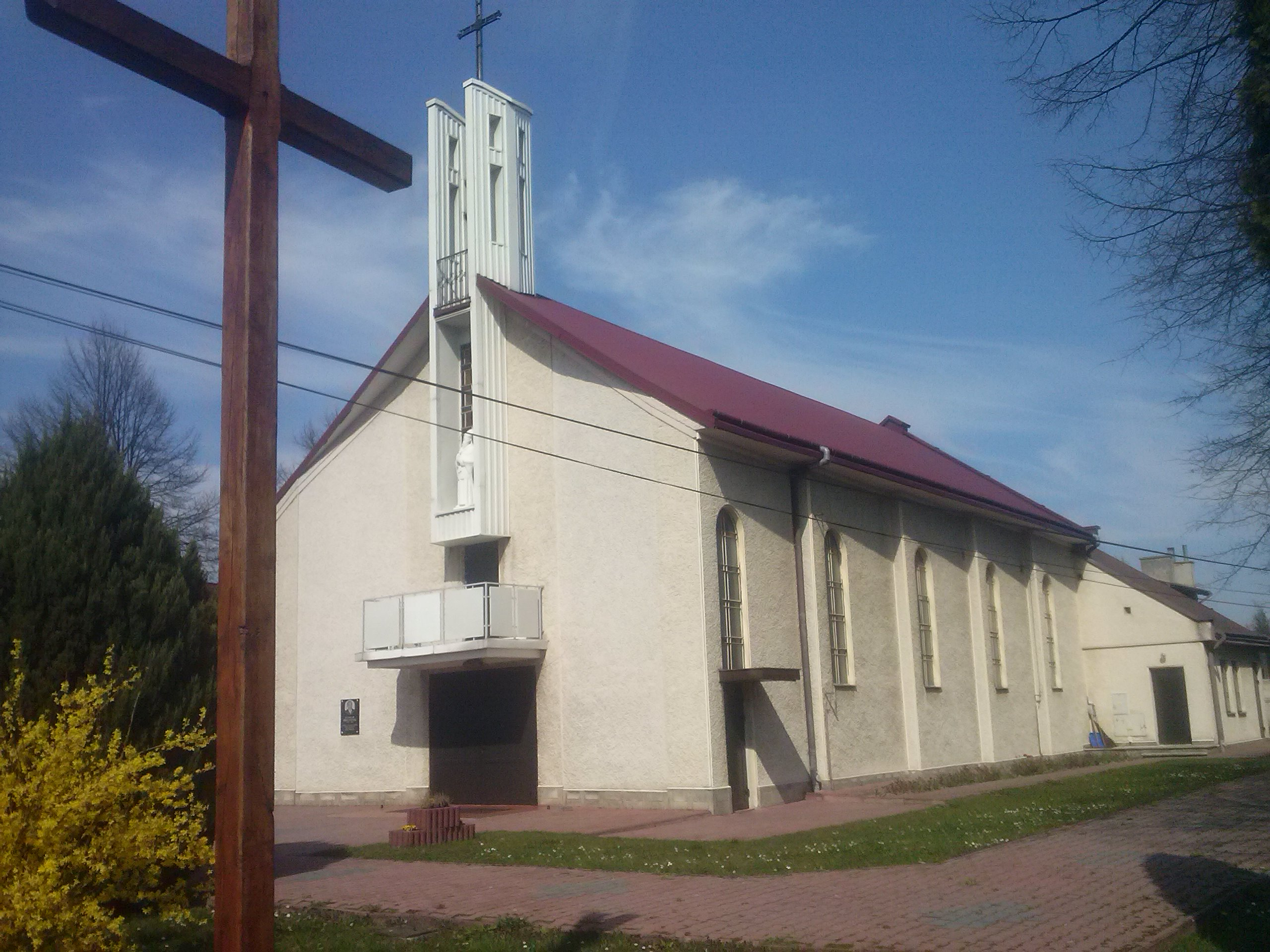
- Church of Saint Hedwig

- Location within Poland
- Coordinates: 50°6′36″N 22°34′05″E
- Country: Poland
- Voivodeship: Subcarpathian
- County: Przeworsk
- Gmina: Tryńcza

Population
  - Total: 1,114 (2,009)

Jagiełła (Polish pronunciation: [jaˈɡʲɛwwa]) is a village in the administrative district of Gmina Tryńcza, within Przeworsk County, Subcarpathian Voivodeship, in south-eastern Poland.
