= Kołuda Mała =

- Village
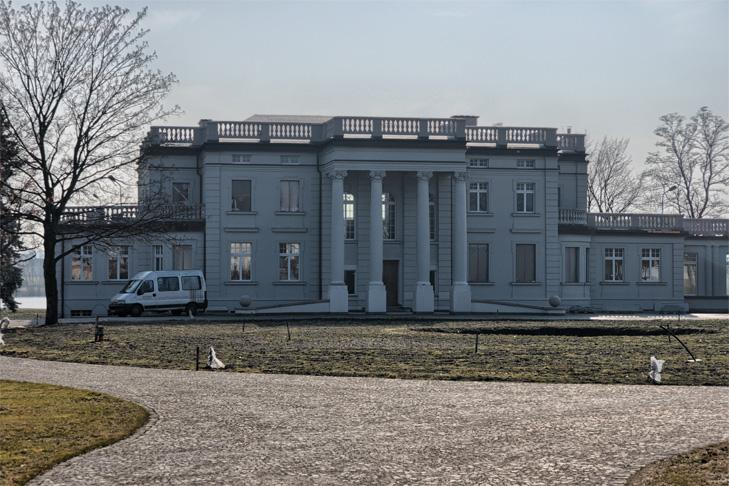

- Location within Poland
- Coordinates: 52°43′N 18°7′E
- Country: Poland
- Voivodeship: Kuyavian-Pomeranian
- County: Inowrocław
- Gmina: Janikowo

Kołuda Mała [kɔˈwuda ˈmawa] is a village in the administrative district of Gmina Janikowo, within Inowrocław County, Kuyavian-Pomeranian Voivodeship, in north-central Poland.
