= Głogowiec, Podkarpackie Voivodeship =

Głogowiec
- Village
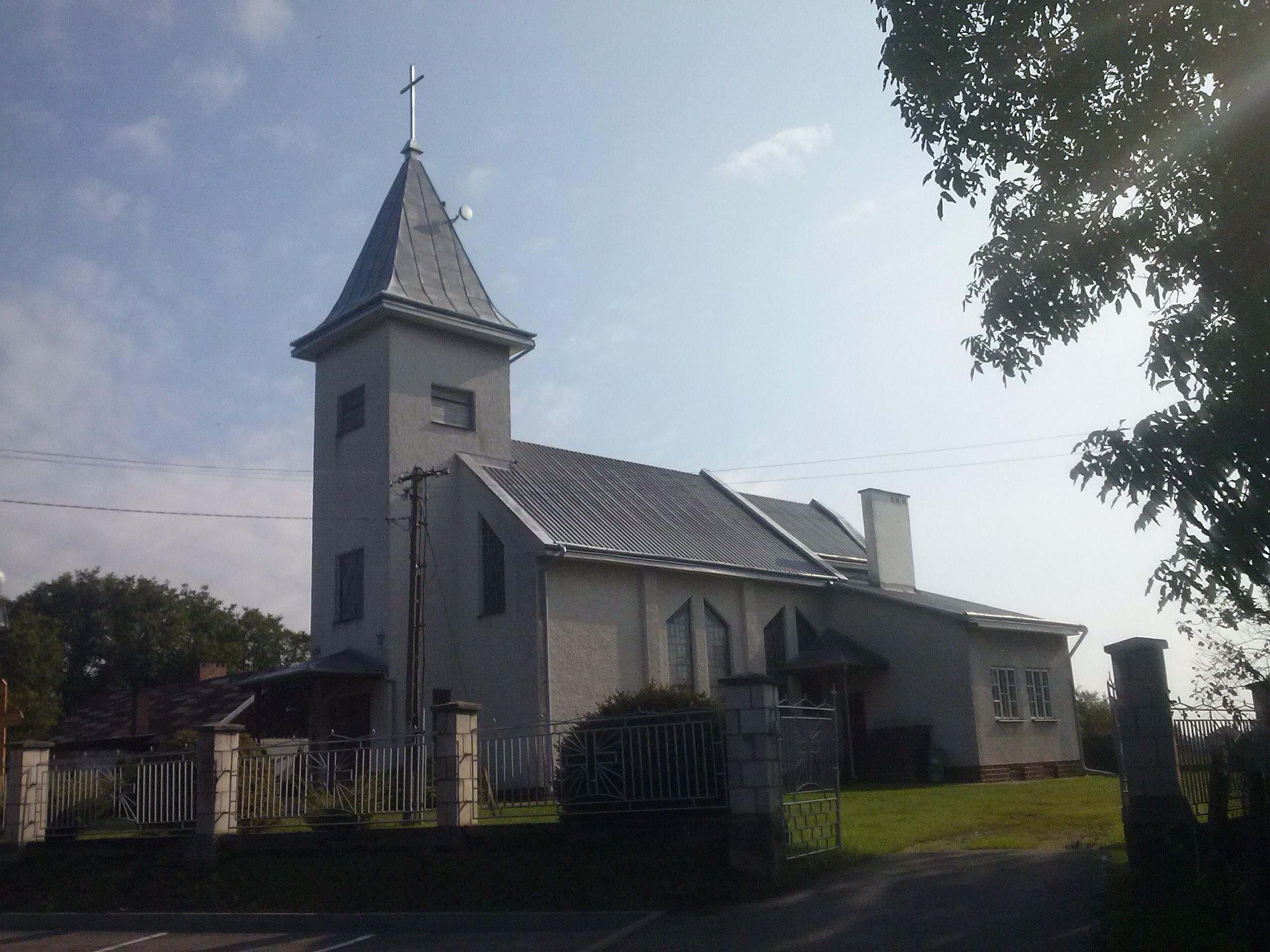
- Church of the Virgin Mary

- Location within Poland
- Coordinates: 50°11′05″N 22°33′28″E
- Country: Poland
- Voivodeship: Podkarpackie
- County: Przeworsk
- Gmina: Tryńcza

Głogowiec [ɡwɔˈɡɔvʲɛt͡s] is a village in the administrative district of Gmina Tryńcza, within Przeworsk County, Podkarpackie Voivodeship, in south-eastern Poland. It lies on the confluence of San and Wisłok rivers.
