= Głogówiec =

- Village
- Location within Poland
- Coordinates: 52°41′47″N 18°06′21″E
- Country: Poland
- Voivodeship: Kuyavian-Pomeranian
- County: Inowrocław
- Gmina: Janikowo

Głogówiec [ɡwɔˈɡuvjɛt͡s] is a village in the administrative district of Gmina Janikowo, within Inowrocław County, Kuyavian-Pomeranian Voivodeship, in north-central Poland.
