= Gniewczyna Łańcucka =

- Village
- Location within Poland
- Coordinates: 50°7′N 22°29′E
- Country: Poland
- Voivodeship: Subcarpathian
- County: Przeworsk
- Gmina: Tryńcza
- Population: 2,203

Gniewczyna Łańcucka (Polish pronunciation: [ɡɲɛfˈt͡ʂɨna waj̃ˈt͡sut͡ska]) is a village in the administrative district of Gmina Tryńcza, within Przeworsk County, Subcarpathian Voivodeship, in south-eastern Poland.

== History ==
In May 1942 Polish citizens of Gniewczyna Łęczycka and Gniewczyna Tryniecka detained and for several days tortured and raped the remaining Jewish population of the village, before handing them over to the Germans for execution. However, some local Poles also tried to shield the Jews.
