= Noteć Inowrocław =

Noteć Inowrocław is a Polish basketball team, based in Inowrocław. The team currently plays in the I Liga, the second tier in Poland.
