= Inowrocław =

City in Kuyavian-Pomeranian Voivodeship, Poland

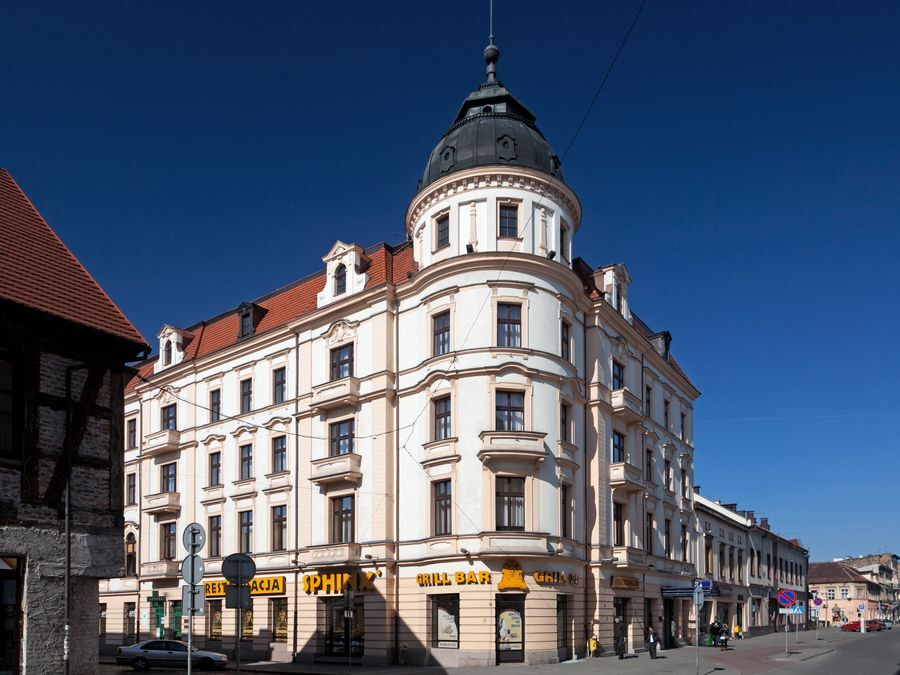
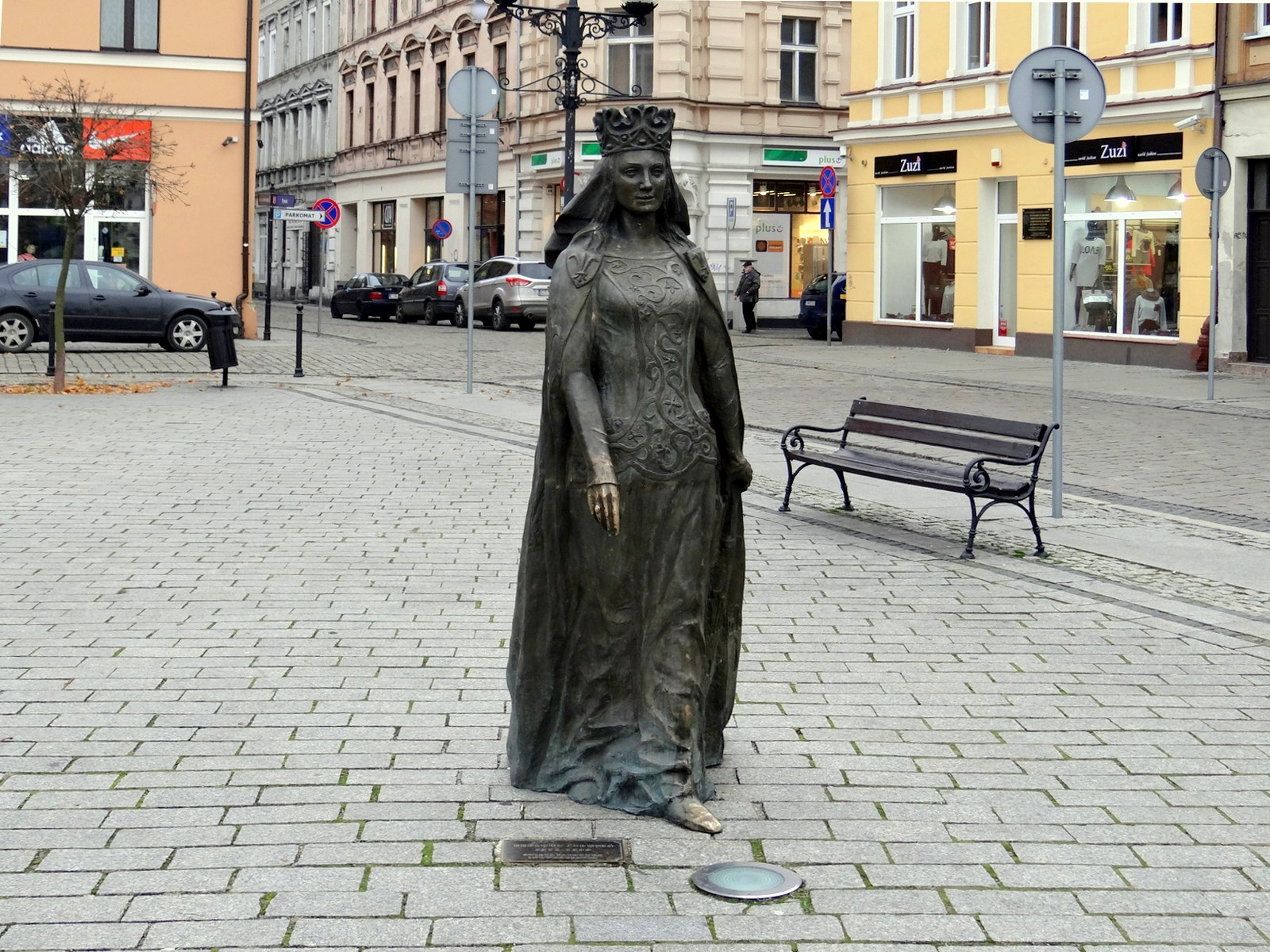
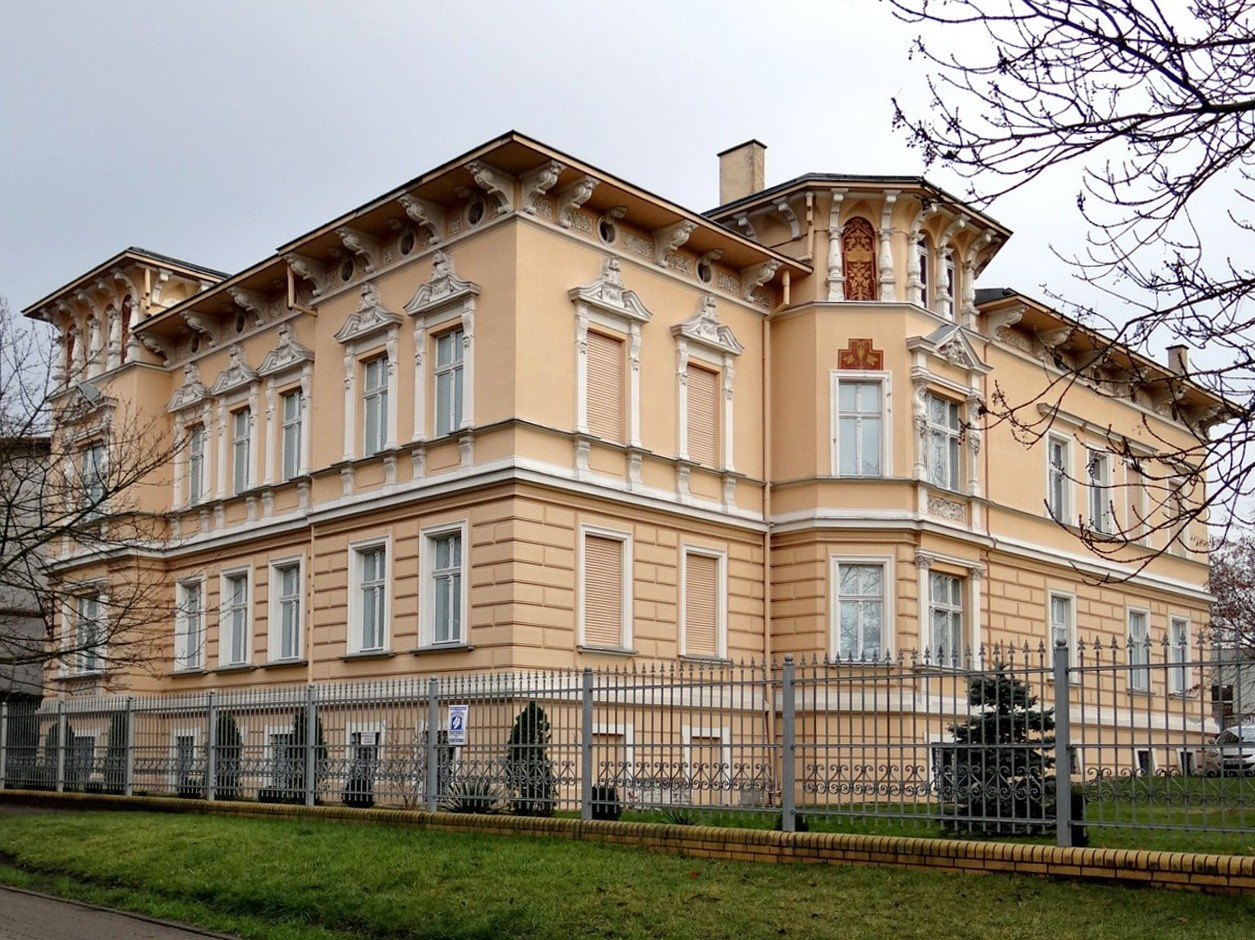
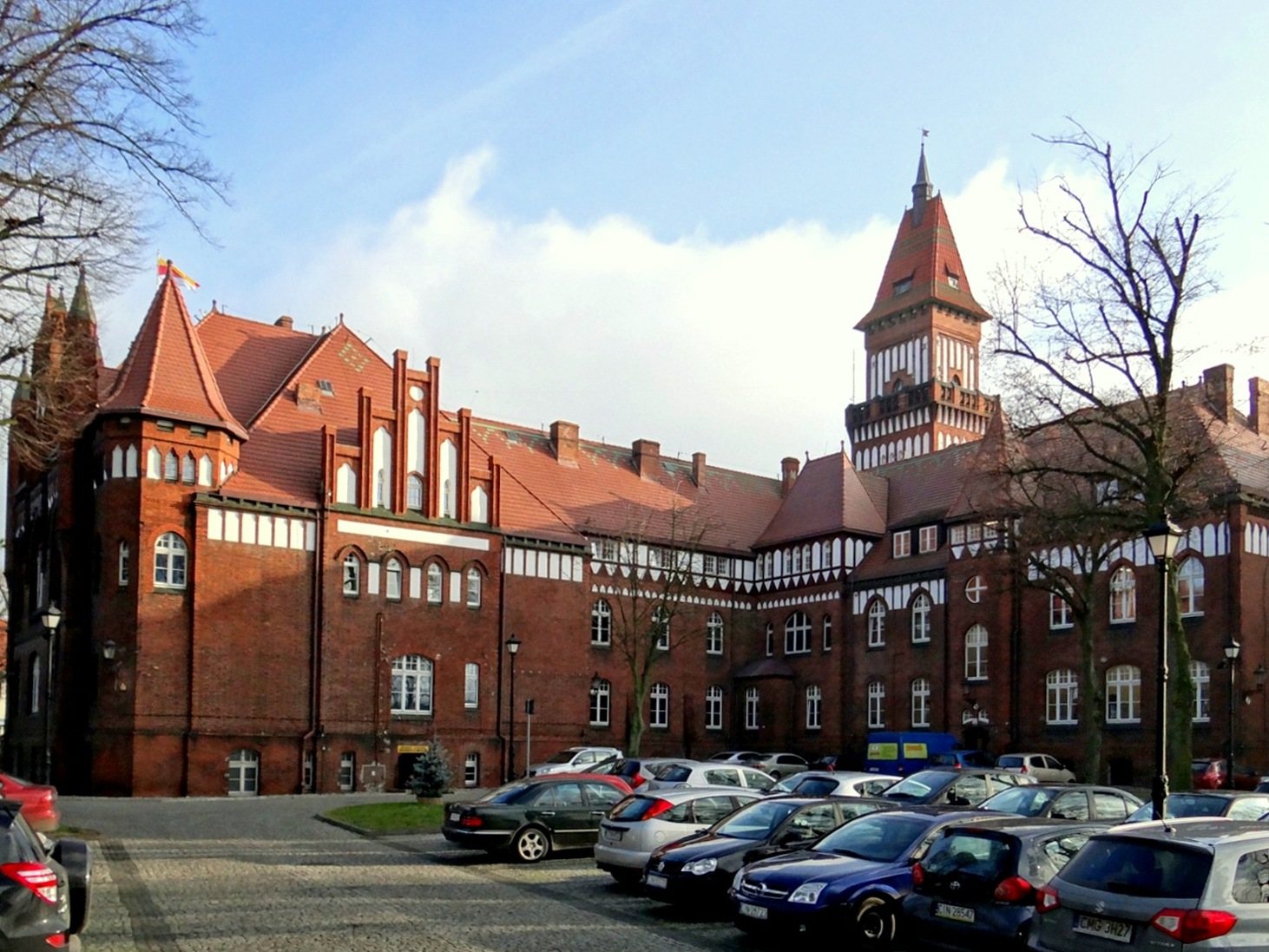
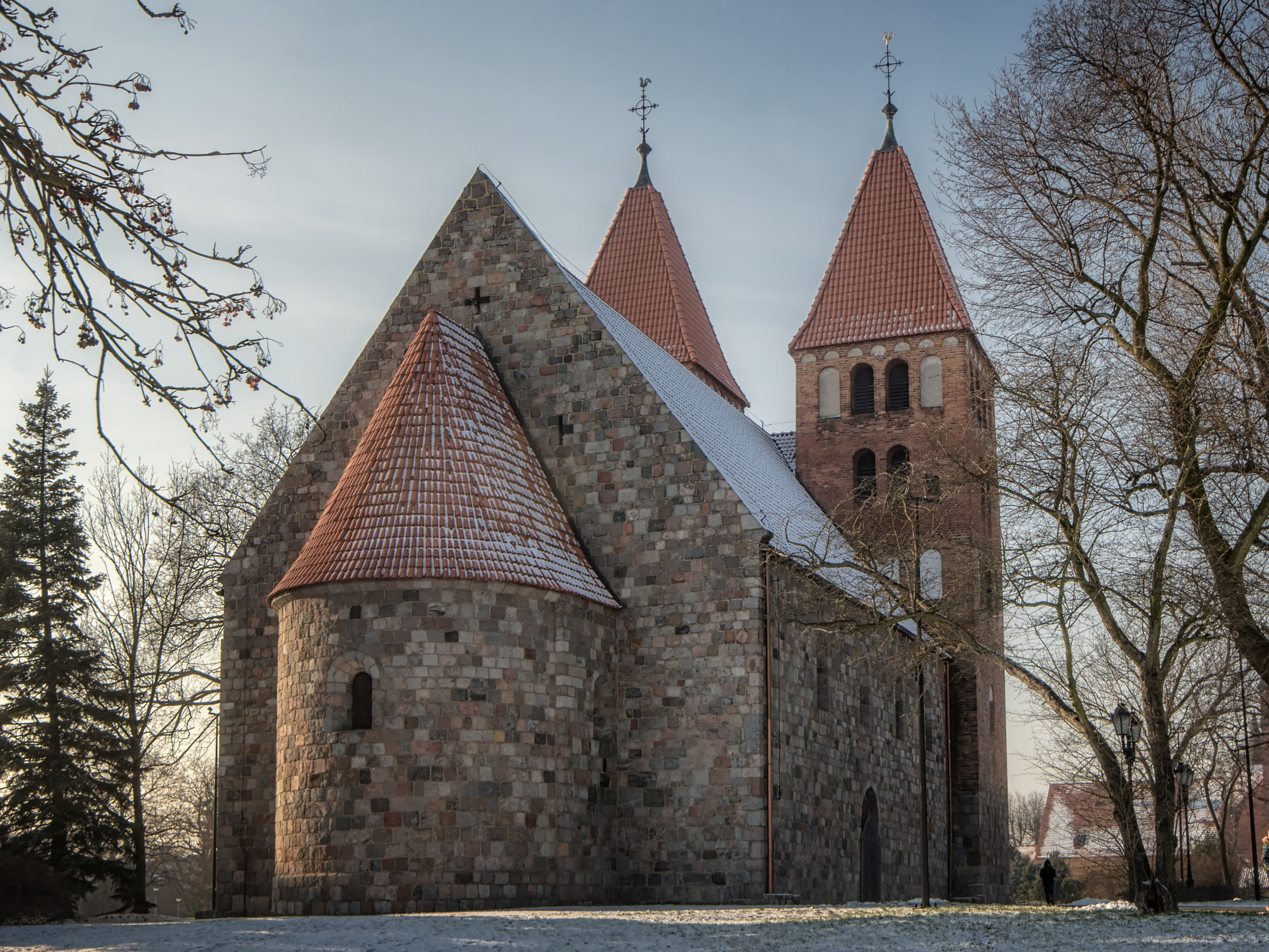
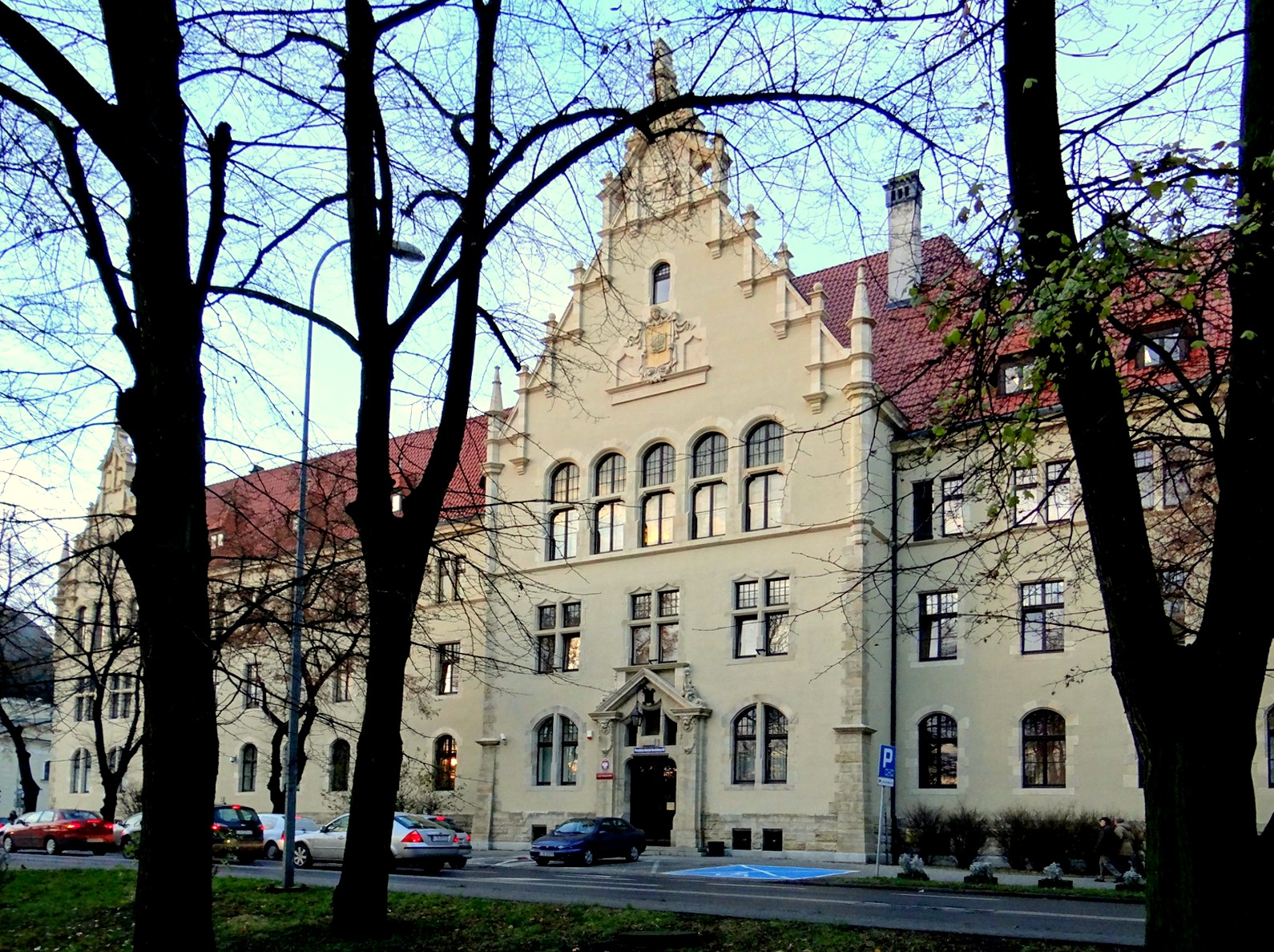
- From top, left to right: Hotel Bast; Queen Jadwiga monument at Market Square; Museum; Town Hall; Holy Name of Mary church; Courthouse

- Flag Coat of arms

- Location within Poland
- Coordinates: 52°47′35″N 18°15′40″E
- Country: Poland
- Voivodeship: Kuyavian-Pomeranian
- County: Inowrocław
- Gmina: Inowrocław (urban gmina)
- First mentioned: 1185
- Town rights: 1238

Government
  - City Mayor: Arkadiusz Fajok

Area
  - Total: 30.42 km^{2} (11.75 sq mi)
- Highest elevation: 100 m (330 ft)
- Lowest elevation: 85 m (279 ft)

Population (31 December 2022)
  - Total: 68,101
- Time zone: UTC+1 (CET)
  - Summer (DST): UTC+2 (CEST)
- Postal code: 88-100 to 88-115
- Area code: (+48) 52
- Car plates: CIN
- Website: http://www.inowroclaw.pl

Inowrocław (Note: Polish pronunciation: [inɔˈvrɔtswaf]; Latin: Novo Wladislaw or Novum Vladislav; German: Hohensalza, before 1904: Inowrazlaw, archaic: Jungleslau, Junges Leslau or Junge Leszlaw; Yiddish: לעסלא, romanized: Les(s)le.) is a city in central Poland with a total population of 68,101 (as of December 2022). It is situated in the Kuyavian-Pomeranian Voivodeship. It is one of the largest and most historically significant cities within the historic region of Kuyavia.

Inowrocław is an industrial town located about 40 kilometres (25 miles) southeast of Bydgoszcz known for its saltwater baths and salt mines. The town is the 5th largest agglomeration in its voivodeship, and is a major railway junction, where the west–east line (Poznań–Toruń) crosses the Polish Coal Trunk-Line from Chorzów to Gdynia.

== History ==
The town was first mentioned in 1185 as Novo Wladislaw, possibly in honor of Władysław I Herman or after the settlers from Włocławek. Many inhabitants of Włocławek settled in Inowrocław fleeing flooding. In 1236, the settlement was renamed Juveni Wladislawia. It was incorporated two years later by Casimir Konradowic. In medieval Latin records, the town was recorded as Juniwladislavia. As a result of the fragmentation of Poland into smaller duchies, after 1230 Inowrocław was the capital of the Duchy of Kuyavia, and from 1267 to 1364 it was the capital of the Duchy of Inowrocław, before it became part and capital of Poland's Inowrocław Voivodeship, which covered northern Kuyavia along with the Dobrzyń Land. The voivodeship later also formed part of the larger Greater Poland Province. Inowrocław was a royal city of the Kingdom of Poland. The town's development was aided by the discovery of extensive salt deposits in the vicinity during the 15th century.

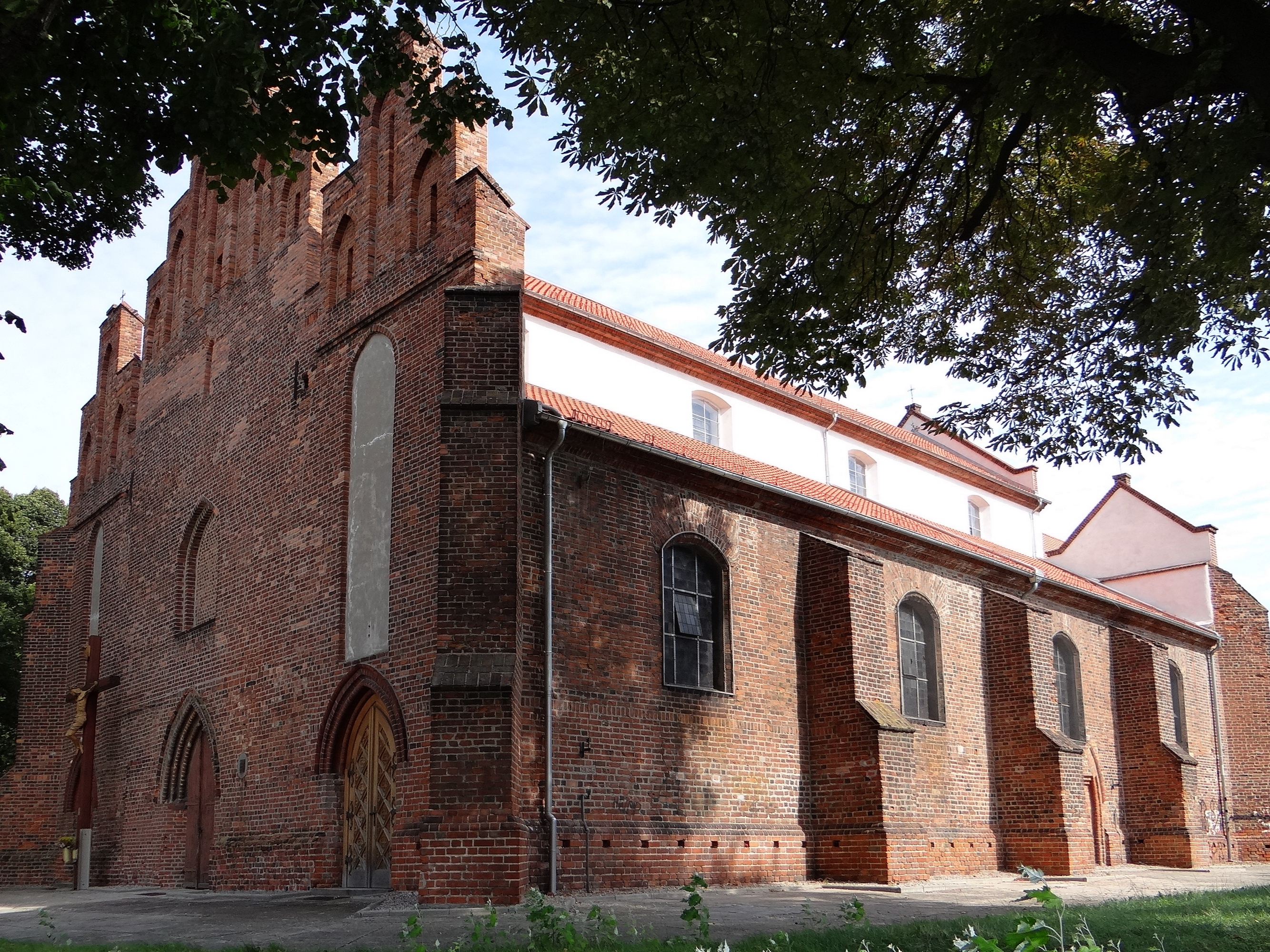
Gothic Saint Nicholas church

It was an important city of late medieval Poland. In 1321, a Polish-Teutonic trial was held in Inowrocław regarding the Teutonic occupation of Gdańsk Pomerania, while the city itself was occupied by the Teutonic Knights from 1332 to 1337. King Casimir III the Great often stayed in the city, and in 1337 he held a meeting with King John of Bohemia in the local castle. A strong garrison was located in the city during the Polish-Teutonic War (1409–1411), and it was the main base of King Władysław II Jagiełło after his victory in the Battle of Grunwald.

Inowrocław was occupied and plundered by Swedish troops during the Deluge in the 1650s, and was annexed to the Kingdom of Prussia in February 1772 during the First Partition of Poland and added to the Netze District. Following the Franco-Prussian Treaty in July 1807, Inowrocław was transferred to the newly created Duchy of Warsaw, which was a client state of the French Empire. The city was a headquarters for Napoleon Bonaparte during his 1812 invasion of Russia. Following the Congress of Vienna in 1815, Inowrocław (as first Inowraclaw and later Inowrazlaw) was transferred back to Prussia as part of the Grand Duchy of Posen. Initially, until 1838 the mayors were still Poles, then Germans. Despite Germanisation attempts, the city was an important center of the Polish resistance during the partitions. It flourished after the establishment of a railway junction in 1872 and a spa in 1875. The city and the region were given the Germanized name Hohensalza on December 5, 1904. It was electrified in 1908.

=== Interbellum ===
After the end of World War I, in November 1918, Poland regained independence and Polish insurgents re-captured the city in January 1919. Restoration to the re-established sovereign Polish state was confirmed in the Treaty of Versailles (which came into effect on January 10, 1920), and the historic name Inowrocław was restored. High unemployment resulting from trade embargoes led to violent confrontations between workers and the police in 1926 and hunger strikes killed 20 in 1930. Inowrocław was part of Poznań Voivodeship until 1925, when it became an independent urban district. This district was briefly assigned to Great Pomerania during the reform of Polish regional administration just before World War II.

=== World War II ===
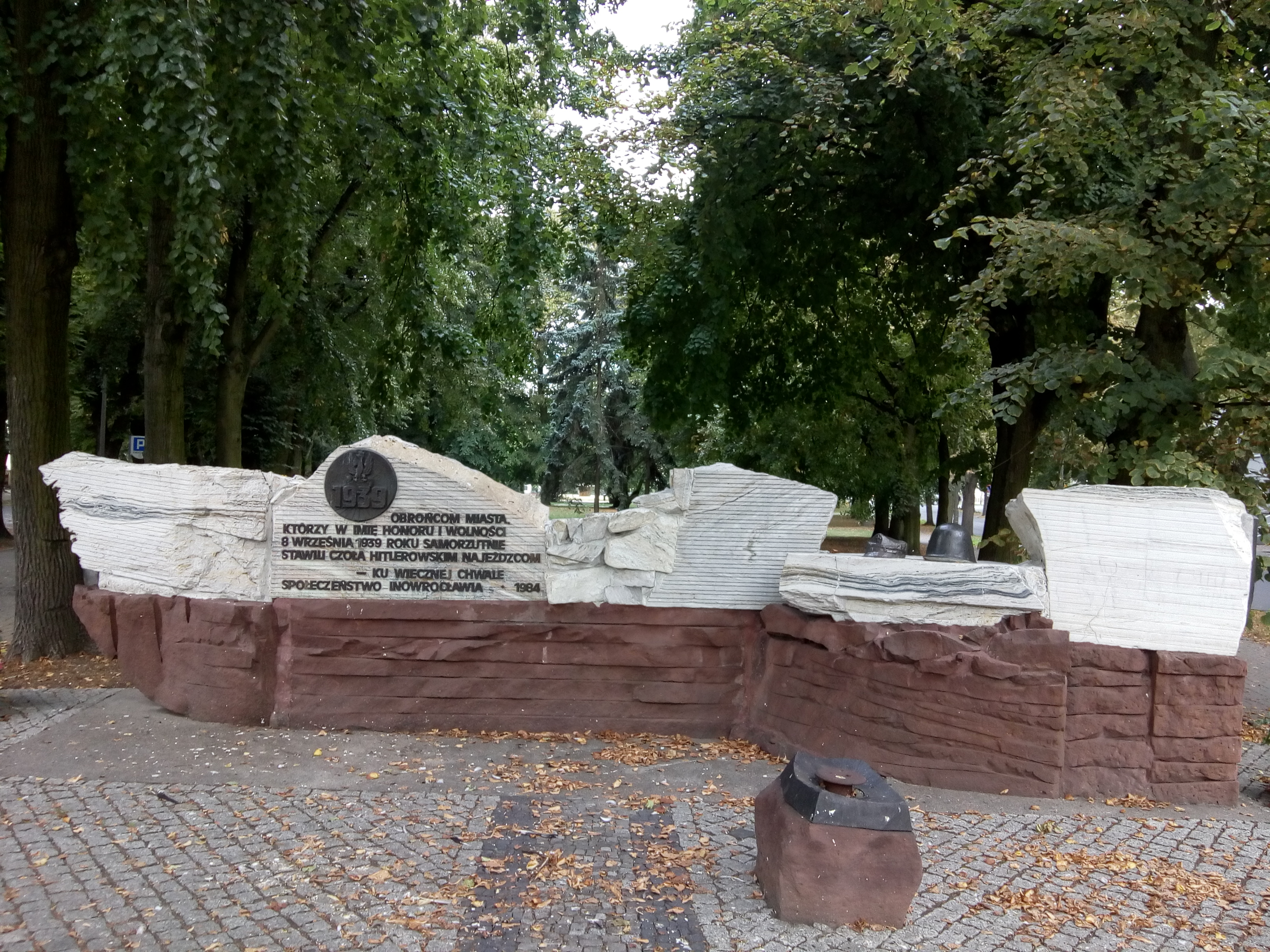
Monument to the Polish defenders of Inowrocław

Captured by the German 4th Army during the invasion of Poland on September 11, 1939, Inowrocław was again renamed Hohensalza and initially administered under the military district (Militärbezirk) of Posen before being incorporated into Nazi Germany first as part of the Reichsgau of Posen (1939) and then as part of Reichsgau Wartheland (1939–1945).

The Einsatzgruppe IV entered the city on September 12–15, 1939, to commit various atrocities against Poles. Poles arrested during the Intelligenzaktion were held in the local prison and in a transit camp, and afterwards mostly murdered in the prison or in the nearby Gniewkowo forest, while some were deported to Nazi concentration camps. In a large massacre, on the night of October 22–23, 1939, the Germans murdered 56 Poles in the prison, including numerous teachers. Families of the victims were expelled, alike local Polish activists and craftsmen, whose workshops were handed over to German colonists in accordance to the Nazi Lebensraum policy. In total, the Germans expelled a few thousand Poles from the city, including over 2,900 already in 1939. Several Poles from Inowrocław were also murdered by the Russians in the large Katyn massacre in April–May 1940.

The Polish resistance was active in Inowrocław, including the Union of Armed Struggle-Home Army and Polska Armia Powstania (Polish Uprising Army) secret military organizations. Multiple local members of the Home Army were imprisoned and murdered by the Germans in the prison camp in Żabikowo in 1944–1945.

Between 1940 and 1945, Hohensalza was used as a resettlement camp for Poles and an internment camp for Soviet, French and British prisoners of war. Germany also operated a forced labour camp in the city.

=== Recent period ===
Inowrocław returned to Poland and its original name following the arrival of the Soviet Red Army on January 21, 1945. The last German air raid occurred on April 4, 1945, when a single aircraft dropped four fragmentation bombs and fired on travelers waiting at the Inowrocław train platform. Between 1950 and 1998, the town was part of Bydgoszcz Voivodeship, but the 1999 reforms left it part of Kuyavian-Pomeranian Voivodeship.

=== Jewish community ===
The first recorded instance of Jews in Inowroclaw was in 1447. By the end of the 16th century, there was an established Jewish community with a rabbi. However, by the end of the 16th century, many of these Jews were murdered by Stefan Czarniecki's army in 1656. In 1680, John III Sobieski restored the rights of Jews in Inowroclaw that had been lost during the previous siege. By 1765, there were 980 Jews living in Inowroclaw, but in 1774 there was a fire that destroyed many Jewish homes, causing many to flee elsewhere.

The ongoing emancipation of Jews in the 18th and 19th centuries lifted restrictions on Jews. Nevertheless, the Jews of Inowroclaw remained devoted to their traditions. They were increasingly allowed into public life, and Jews were even allowed to run for seats in the Municipal Council. In the 1830s, illiteracy was abolished amongst Jewish boys in Inowroclaw as they were made to take German classes. However, there was a disparity between the young and old Jewish generations as many older Jews were interested in staying true to their traditions and did not want to be Germanized.

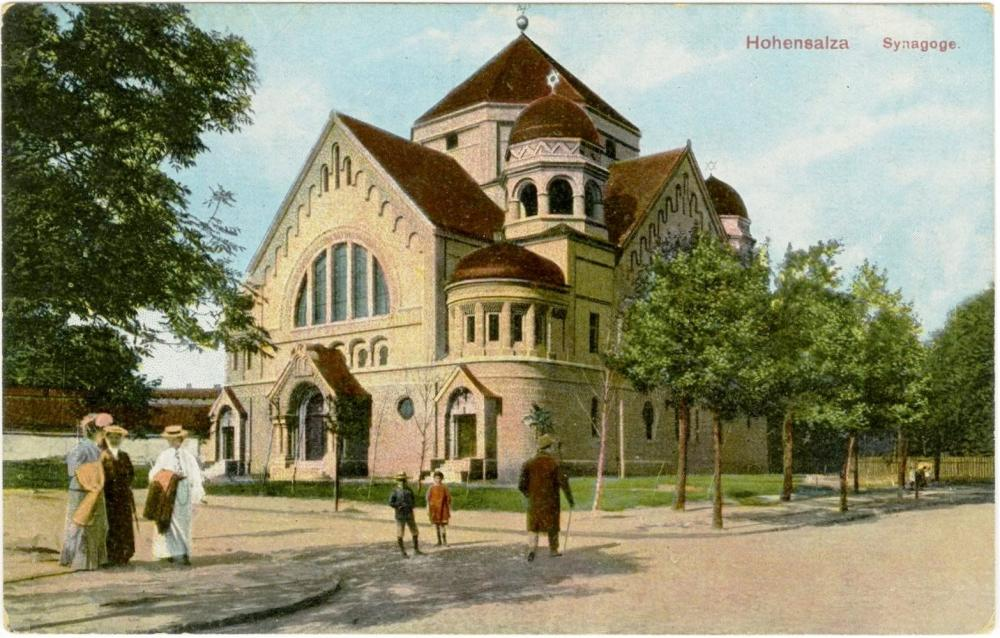
Inowroclaw synagogue

A synagogue was created on 9 September 1836. However, in 1908, this synagogue closed and was turned into a beth midrash, house of prayer, and the seat of the community administration. A new synagogue, funded by Leopold Levy, one of the wealthiest Jews in the town, was created in its place.

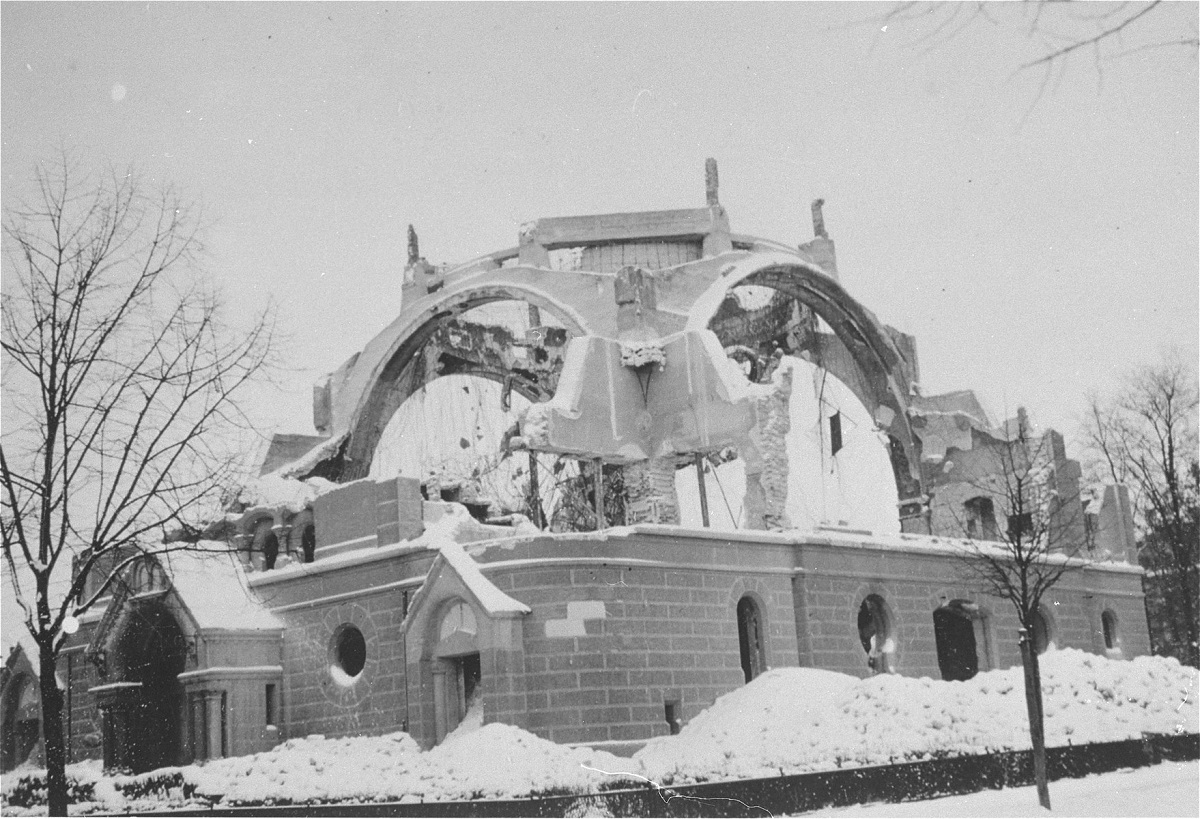
Inowroclaw synagogue after being plundered and set on fire by the Nazis

The community steadily lost its population in second half of the 19th century as many moved to Germany and the United States. In 1921, there were only 252 Jews left in the town.

On 14 September 1939, the Nazis seized Inowroclaw. The synagogue was plundered and set on fire. The next day, the Jews were ordered to stand in the synagogue, where Leopold Levy was executed. Both the old and new Jewish cemeteries were destroyed. The Inowroclaw Jews went through a selection process. The people chosen for extermination were sent to the Inowroclaw prison. In October, they were taken to the forest in Gniewkowo and shot dead. By the end of 1940, there were no Jews left in Inowroclaw, with few surviving the war. The few Jews who survived came back to Inowroclaw after the war; however, there was no attempt to re-establish a Jewish community.

=== Historical population ===
Historical population
Year	Pop.	±%
1970	54,900	—
1980	66,100	+20.4%
1990	77,700	+17.5%
2000	79,400	+2.2%
2004	77,647	−2.2%
2014	74,803	−3.7%
2019	72,561	−3.0%

== Landmarks and monuments ==
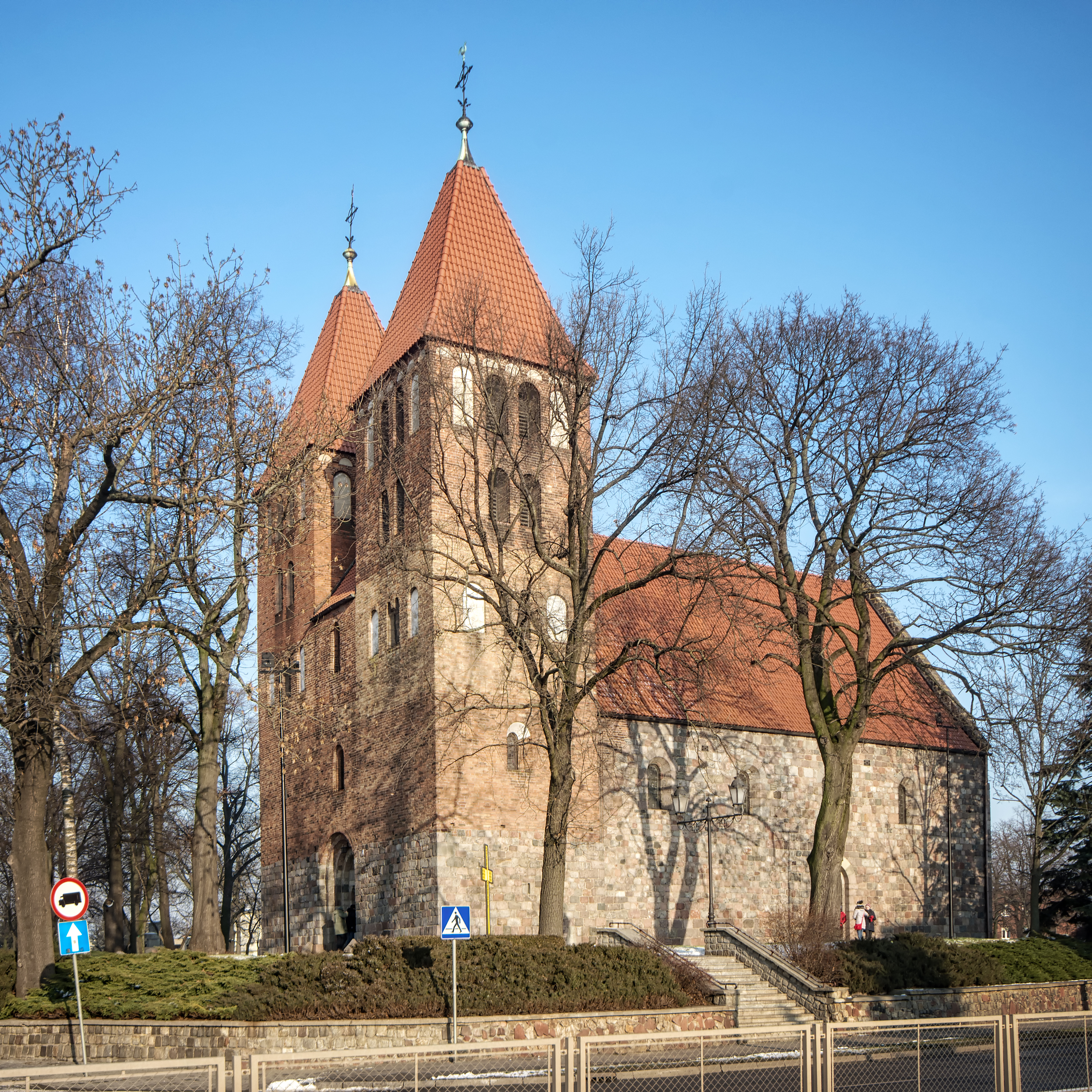
Romanesque Basilica of the Blessed Lady Mary, 12th-13th century

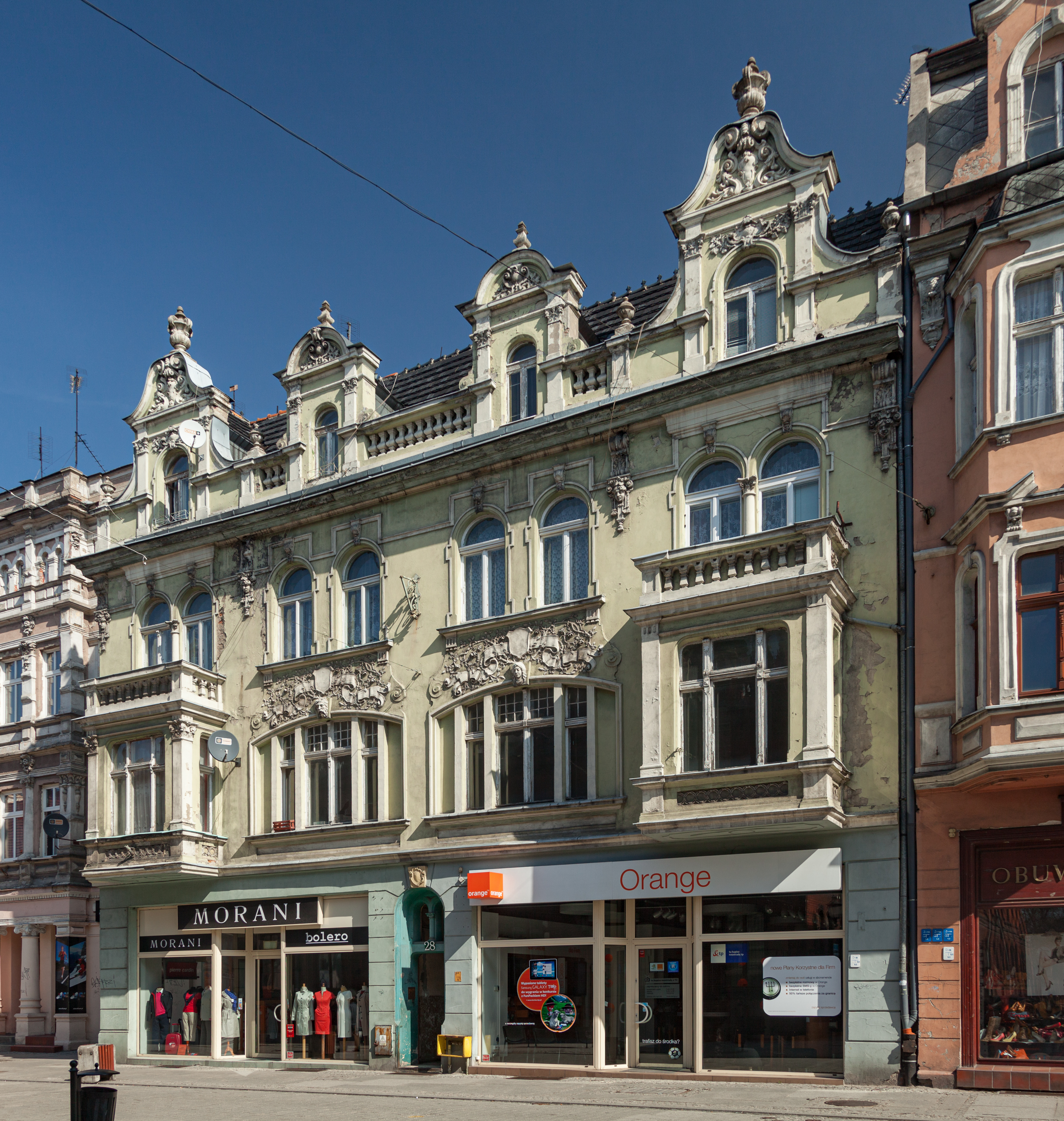
28 Królowej Jadwigi Street

- The romanesque church of the St Virgin Mary, dating back to the end of the 12th century or beginning of the 13th century, built from granite stones and brick. In 1834 it was destroyed by fire, and partially reconstructed in the 1950s. Since 13 July 2008 the St Virgin Mary's church is also the Minor Basilica (in Polish: Bazylika Mniejsza Imienia Najświętszej Maryi Panny)
- The Gothic church of St. Nicholas, first built in the middle of the 13th century, the present church was built after damage in the 15th century, and rebuilt in the 17th century
- The Neo-Romanesque church of the Annunciation to the Virgin Mary, built between 1898 and 1900, consecrated in 1902, the largest church in the city, with an imposing 77-metre-high (253 ft) tower. The north side of the transept collapsed in a construction disaster in 1909 and was not rebuilt until 1929.
- A large salt graduation tower complex. These wooden wall-like frames are stuffed with bundles of brushwood, and produce salt, as well as a saline atmosphere seen as healthy, akin to sea air. It also produces "Inowrocławianka," Poland's saltiest mineral water.
- The garrison church of St. Barbara and St. Maurice
- The house of Czabańscy family from c. 1800
- Houses, hotel "Bast" and spa buildings from the turn of the 19th and 20th centuries

== Districts and neighborhoods ==
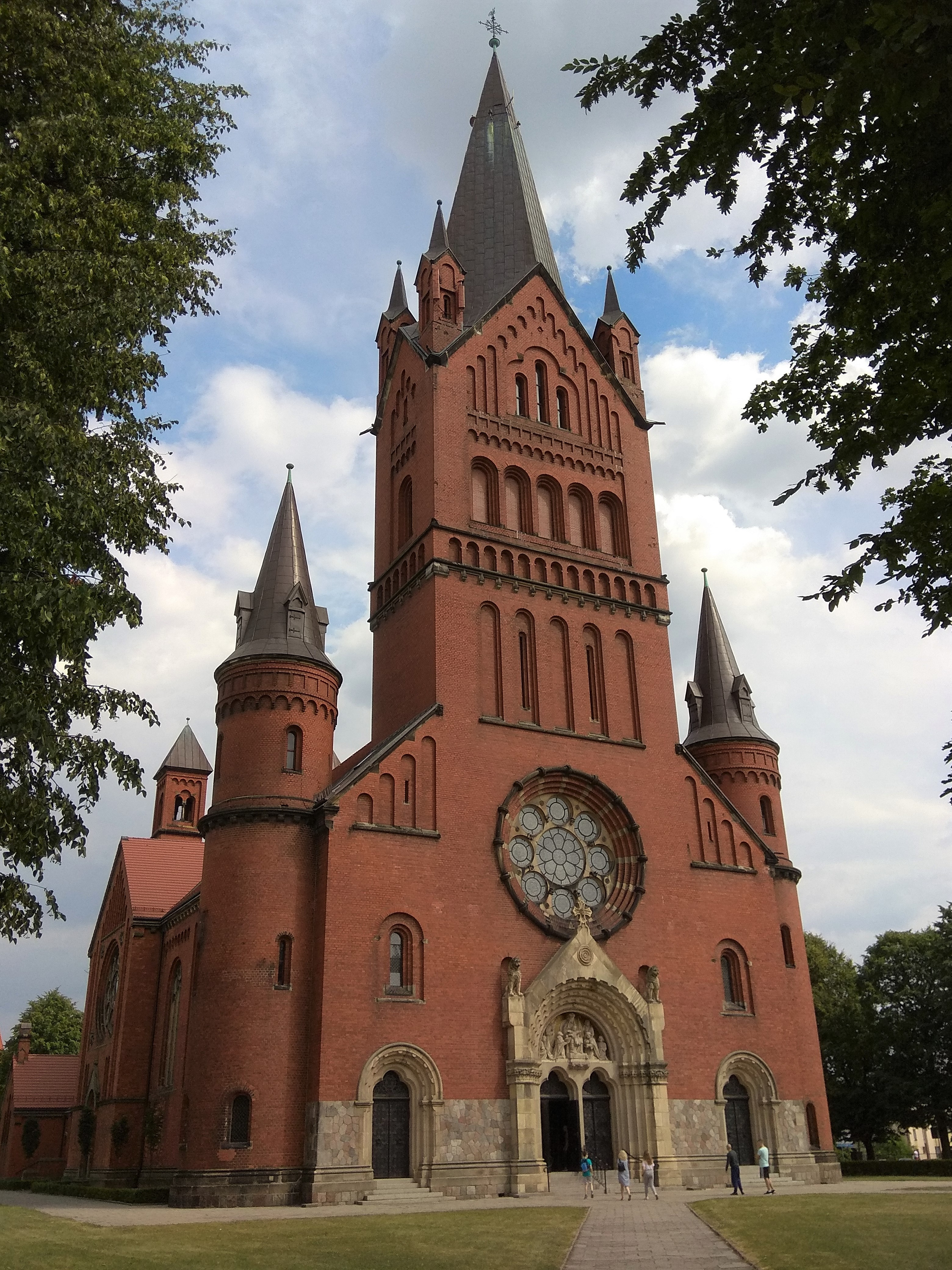
Church of the Annunciation

- Śródmieście
- Stare Miasto
- Nowe Osiedle
- Osiedle Bydgoskie
- Osiedle Toruńskie
- Osiedle Piastowskie
- Uzdrowisko
- Miechowiczki
- Osiedle Bajka
- Rąbin
- Rąbinek
- Mątwy
- Szymborze
- Solno
- Kruśliwiec
- Osiedle Zdrojowe
- Osiedle Kolejowe
- Cegielnia
- Osiedle Sady
- Osiedle Okrężek
- Osiedle Lotnicze

== Sport ==
The most popular sports in the city are basketball and football. Notable teams:

- Noteć Inowrocław – men's basketball team, formerly playing in the Polish Basketball League, the country's top division.
- Sportino Inowrocław – men's basketball team, which replaced SSA Notec, but in the 1st league.
- Goplania Inowrocław – men's football team, they are playing in 4th league.
- Cuiavia Inowrocław – men's football team, they are playing in 4th league.

== Notable people ==
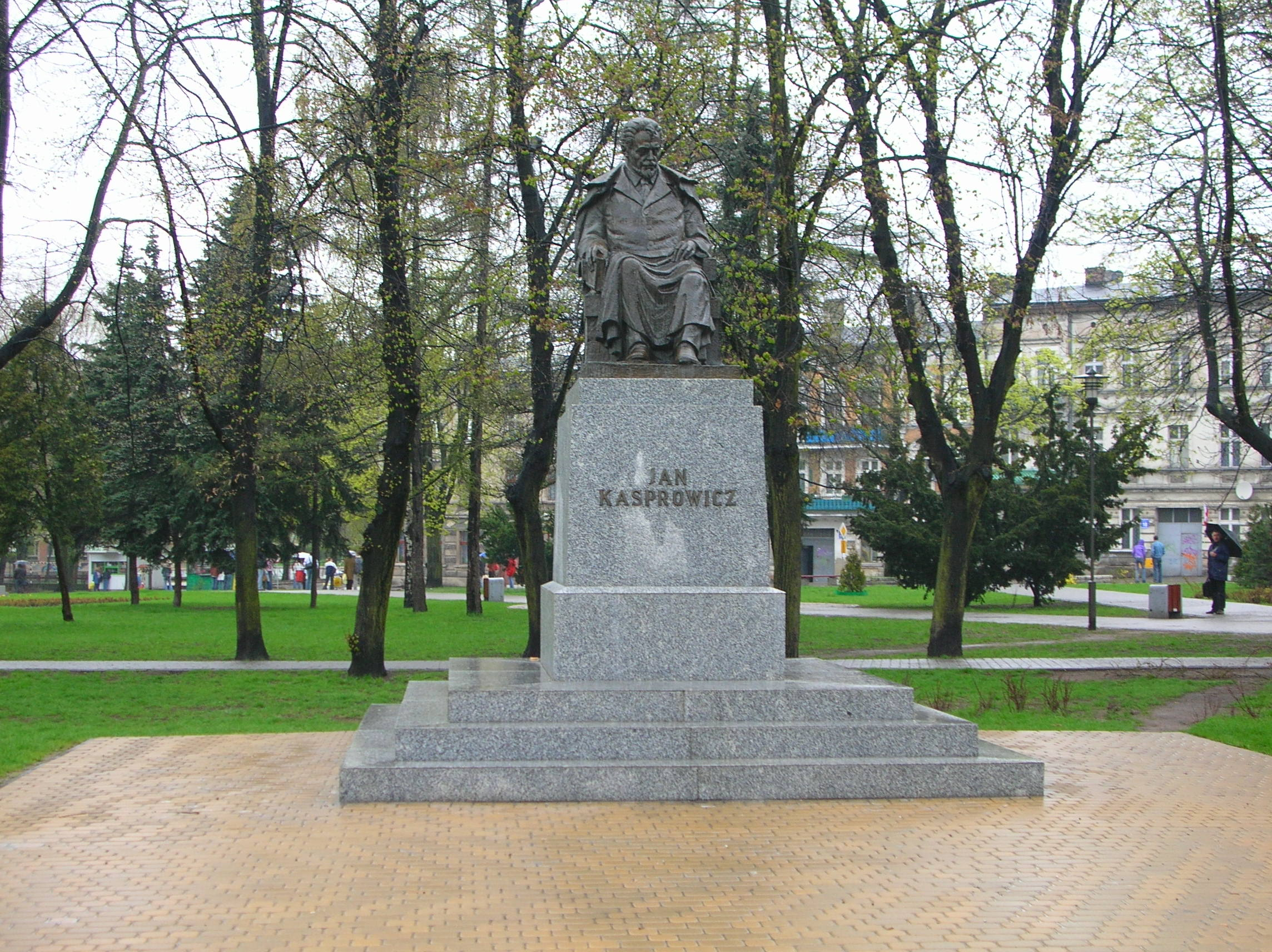
Jan Kasprowicz monument

- Adolph Salomonsohn (1831–1919), banker
- Berthold Fernow (1837–1908), historian
- Agnieszka Pachałko (1973), Miss International 1993
- Jan Kasprowicz (1860–1926), poet, playwright, critic and translator
- Leopold Loeske (1865–1935), bryologist
- Leopold Levy (1870-1939), Jewish politician, entrepreneur and lawyer
- Gus Edwards (1879–1945), musician
- Alfred Herrmann (1879–1960), politician
- Gustav Heistermann von Ziehlberg (1898–1945), German general and resistance fighter
- Hans Jeschonnek (1899–1943), Luftwaffe general
- Arthur Sodtke (1901–1944), resistance fighter
- Justus Frantz (born 1944), musician
- Wojciech Polak (born 1964), Roman Catholic archbishop
- Tomasz Wasilewski (born 1980), film director and screenwriter
- Krzysztof Szubarga (born 1984), basketball player
- Marcin Mroziński (born 1985), actor, singer
- Tomasz Ziętek (born 1989), actor
