= 2016–17 Ekstraklasa =

81st season of top-tier football league in Poland

Ekstraklasa
- Season: 2016–17
- Dates: 15 July 2016 – 4 June 2017
- Champions: Legia Warsaw (12th title)
- Relegated: Górnik Łęczna; Ruch Chorzów
- Champions League: Legia Warsaw
- Europa League: Arka Gdynia; Jagiellonia Białystok; Lech Poznań
- Matches: 296
- Goals: 812 (2.74 per match)
- Top goalscorer: Marco Paixão; Marcin Robak (18 goals)
- Biggest home win: Cracovia 6–0 Korona (2 October 2016); Śląsk 6–0 Ruch (13 May 2017); Legia 6–0 Termalica (14 May 2017)
- Biggest away win: Ruch 0–5 Lech (4 November 2016)
- Highest scoring: Pogoń 6–2 Wisła K. (19 November 2016)
- Longest winning run: 5 matches Legia Warsaw; Lech Poznań
- Longest unbeaten run: 15 matches Legia Warsaw
- Longest winless run: 11 matches Ruch Chorzów
- Longest losing run: 7 matches Wisła Kraków
- Highest attendance: 41,026; Lech 1–2 Legia (9 April 2017)
- Lowest attendance: 0 Cracovia 1–1 Ruch (20 August 2016); Ruch 0–1 Termalica (16 September 2016)
- Total attendance: 2,848,108
- Average attendance: 9,622 ▲5.7%

The 2016–17 Ekstraklasa (also known as Lotto Ekstraklasa due to its sponsorship by Totalizator Sportowy, Polish lottery) was the 83rd season of the Ekstraklasa, the top Polish professional league for association football clubs, since its establishment in 1927. The league is operated by the Ekstraklasa SA.

The season started on 15 July 2016, running to 4 June 2017. After the 20th matchday the league was on winter break between 20 December 2016 and 9 February 2017. The regular season was played in a round-robin tournament. A total of 16 teams participated, 14 of which competed in the league during the 2015–16 season, while the remaining two were promoted from the I liga. The fixtures were announced on 1 June 2016.

Each team played a total of 30 matches, half at home and half away. After 30th round (at the end of April 2017), league was split into two groups: championship round (top eight teams) and relegation round (bottom eight teams). Each team was play 7 more games (1-4 and 9-12 teams will play four times at home), starting with half the points achieved during the first phase of 30 matches. So, finally each team played a total of 37 matches. This is the fourth season to take place since the new playoff/playout rule has been introduced.

The defending champions were Legia Warsaw, who won their 11th Polish title the previous season.

== Teams ==
Sixteen teams competed in the league – the top fourteen teams from the previous season, as well as two teams promoted from the I liga. Arka Gdynia became the first team to be promoted. They return to the league after a five-season absence. Wisła Płock returns to the top level nine years after their relegation. Termalica Bruk-Bet Nieciecza changed its name to Bruk-Bet Termalica Nieciecza.

=== Stadiums ===
Note: Table lists in alphabetical order.

Team	Location	Venue	Capacity
Arka Gdynia	Gdynia	Stadion GOSiR	15,139
Bruk-Bet Termalica Nieciecza	Nieciecza	Stadion Bruk-Bet	4,666
Cracovia	Kraków	Stadion im. Józefa Piłsudskiego	15,016
Górnik Łęczna	Lublin	Arena Lublin	15,500
Jagiellonia Białystok	Białystok	Stadion Jagiellonii	22,432
Korona Kielce	Kielce	Kolporter Arena	15,550
Lech Poznań	Poznań	INEA Stadion	43,269
Lechia Gdańsk	Gdańsk	Stadion Energa Gdańsk	43,615
Legia Warsaw	Warsaw	Stadion Wojska Polskiego	31,800
Piast Gliwice	Gliwice	Arena Gliwice	10,037
Pogoń Szczecin	Szczecin	Stadion im. Floriana Krygiera	18,027
Ruch Chorzów	Chorzów	Stadion Ruchu Chorzów	9,300
Śląsk Wrocław	Wrocław	Stadion Wrocław	42,771
Wisła Kraków	Kraków	Stadion im. Henryka Reymana	33,326
Wisła Płock	Płock	Stadion im. Kazimierza Górskiego	12,800
Zagłębie Lubin	Lubin	Stadion Zagłębia	16,068

Arka	Termalica	Cracovia	Górnik Łęczna	Jagiellonia	Korona
Stadion GOSiR	Stadion Bruk-Bet	Stadion im. Józefa Piłsudskiego	Arena Lublin	Stadion Jagiellonii	Kolporter Arena
Capacity: 15,139	Capacity: 4,666	Capacity: 15,016	Capacity: 15,500	Capacity: 22,432	Capacity: 15,550
Lech	Location of teams in 2016–17 Ekstraklasa				Lechia
INEA Stadion	Location of teams in 2016–17 Ekstraklasa				Stadion Energa Gdańsk
Capacity: 43,269	Location of teams in 2016–17 Ekstraklasa				Capacity: 43,615
Legia	Location of teams in 2016–17 Ekstraklasa				Piast
Stadion Wojska Polskiego	Location of teams in 2016–17 Ekstraklasa				Arena Gliwice
Capacity: 31,800	Location of teams in 2016–17 Ekstraklasa				Capacity: 10,037
Pogoń	Ruch	Śląsk	Wisła Kraków	Wisła Płock	Zagłębie
Stadion im. Floriana Krygiera	Stadion Ruchu Chorzów	Stadion Wrocław	Stadion im. Henryka Reymana	Stadion im. Kazimierza Górskiego	Stadion Zagłębia
Capacity: 18,027	Capacity: 9,300	Capacity: 42,771	Capacity: 33,326	Capacity: 12,800	Capacity: 16,068

=== Personnel and kits ===
Team	Chairman	Head coach	Captain	Manufacturer	Sponsors
Arka Gdynia	(Poland) Wojciech Pertkiewicz	(Poland) Leszek Ojrzyński	(Slovakia) Miroslav Božok	Adidas	Gdynia
Bruk-Bet Termalica Nieciecza	(Poland) Danuta Witkowska	(Poland) Marcin Węglewski	(Poland) Bartłomiej Babiarz	Nike	Bruk-Bet
Cracovia	(Poland) Janusz Filipiak	(Poland) Jacek Zieliński	(Poland) Piotr Polczak	Legea	Comarch
Górnik Łęczna	(Poland) Artur Kapelko	(Poland) Franciszek Smuda	(Poland) Sergiusz Prusak	Jako	Lubelski Węgiel Bogdanka
Jagiellonia Białystok	(Poland) Cezary Kulesza	(Poland) Michał Probierz	(Poland) Rafał Grzyb	Errea	STAG SA, Wschodzący Białystok
Korona Kielce	(Poland) Krzysztof Zając	(Poland) Maciej Bartoszek	(Czech Republic) Radek Dejmek	Hummel	Lewiatan
Lech Poznań	(Poland) Karol Klimczak	(Croatia) Nenad Bjelica	(Poland) Łukasz Trałka	Nike	STS
Lechia Gdańsk	(Poland) Adam Mandziara	(Poland) Piotr Nowak	(Poland) Sebastian Mila	New Balance	Energa
Legia Warsaw	(Poland) Dariusz Mioduski	(Poland) Jacek Magiera	(Poland) Jakub Rzeźniczak	Adidas	Fortuna
Piast Gliwice	(Poland) Marek Kwiatek	(Poland) Dariusz Wdowczyk	(Poland) Radosław Murawski	Joma	E-Toto
Pogoń Szczecin	(Poland) Jarosław Mroczek	(Poland) Kazimierz Moskal	(Poland) Rafał Murawski	Zina	Grupa Azoty, Miasto Szczecin
Ruch Chorzów	(Poland) Janusz Paterman	(Poland) Krzysztof Warzycha	(Poland) Rafał Grodzicki	Adidas	Górny Śląsk
Śląsk Wrocław	(Poland) Michał Bobowiec	(Poland) Jan Urban	(Poland) Piotr Celeban	Adidas	Wrocław
Wisła Kraków	(Poland) Marzena Sarapata	(Spain) Kiko Ramírez	(Poland) Arkadiusz Głowacki	Adidas	LV Bet
Wisła Płock	(Poland) Jacek Kruszewski	(Poland) Marcin Kaczmarek	(Poland) Maksymilian Rogalski	Adidas	PKN Orlen, Budmat
Zagłębie Lubin	(Poland) Tomasz Dębicki	(Poland) Piotr Stokowiec	(Poland) Konrad Forenc	Nike	KGHM

=== Managerial changes ===
Team	Outgoing manager	Manner of departure	Date of vacancy	Position in table	Incoming manager	Date of appointment
Pogoń Szczecin	(Poland) Czesław Michniewicz	End of contract	30 June 2016	Pre-season	(Poland) Kazimierz Moskal	30 June 2016
Korona Kielce	(Poland) Marcin Brosz	End of contract	30 June 2016	Pre-season	(Poland) Tomasz Wilman	30 June 2016
Legia Warsaw	(Russia) Stanislav Cherchesov	Resigned	1 June 2016	Pre-season	(Kosovo) (Albania) Besnik Hasi	3 June 2016
Bruk-Bet Termalica Nieciecza	(Poland) Piotr Mandrysz	End of contract	6 June 2016	Pre-season	(Poland) Czesław Michniewicz	6 June 2016
Piast Gliwice	(Czech Republic) Radoslav Látal	Resigned	15 July 2016	Pre-season	(Czech Republic) Jiří Neček (interim)	15 July 2016
Lech Poznań	(Poland) Jan Urban	Sacked	29 August 2016	12th	(Croatia) Nenad Bjelica	30 August 2016
Piast Gliwice	(Czech Republic) Jiří Neček	Caretaking spell over	30 August 2016	14th	(Czech Republic) Radoslav Látal	1 September 2016
Legia Warsaw	(Kosovo) (Albania) Besnik Hasi	Sacked	18 September 2016	14th	(Serbia) Aleksandar Vuković (interim)	19 September 2016
Legia Warsaw	(Serbia) Aleksandar Vuković	Caretaking spell over	24 September 2016	11th	(Poland) Jacek Magiera	24 September 2016
Korona Kielce	(Poland) Tomasz Wilman	Sacked	25 October 2016	16th	(Poland) Sławomir Grzesik (interim)	25 October 2016
Wisła Kraków	(Poland) Dariusz Wdowczyk	Resigned	10 November 2016	10th	(Poland) Kazimierz Kmiecik (interim)	10 November 2016
Korona Kielce	(Poland) Sławomir Grzesik	Caretaking spell over	10 November 2016	13th	(Poland) Maciej Bartoszek	10 November 2016
Górnik Łęczna	(Poland) Andrzej Rybarski	Resigned	1 December 2016	16th	(Poland) Sławomir Nazaruk (interim)	3 December 2016
Górnik Łęczna	(Poland) Sławomir Nazaruk (interim)	Caretaking spell over	15 December 2016	15th	(Poland) Franciszek Smuda	15 December 2016
Śląsk Wrocław	(Poland) Mariusz Rumak	Resigned	19 December 2016	12th	(Poland) Jan Urban	5 January 2017
Wisła Kraków	(Poland) Kazimierz Kmiecik	Caretaking spell over	3 January 2017	10th	(Spain) Kiko Ramírez	3 January 2017
Piast Gliwice	(Czech Republic) Radoslav Látal	Sacked	2 March 2017	15th	(Poland) Dariusz Wdowczyk	3 March 2017
Bruk-Bet Termalica Nieciecza	(Poland) Czesław Michniewicz	Resigned	22 March 2017	7th	(Poland) Marcin Węglewski (interim)	27 March 2017
Arka Gdynia	(Poland) Grzegorz Niciński	Resigned	10 April 2017	13th	(Poland) Leszek Ojrzyński	10 April 2017
Ruch Chorzów	(Poland) Waldemar Fornalik	Resigned	22 April 2017	14th	(Poland) Krzysztof Warzycha	24 April 2017

== Regular season ==
=== League table ===
Pos	Team	Pld	W	D	L	GF	GA	GD	Pts	Qualification
1	Jagiellonia Białystok	30	18	5	7	56	31	+25	59	Qualification for the championship round
2	Legia Warsaw	30	17	7	6	58	30	+28	58	Qualification for the championship round
3	Lech Poznań	30	16	7	7	50	22	+28	55	Qualification for the championship round
4	Lechia Gdańsk	30	16	5	9	46	37	+9	53	Qualification for the championship round
5	Wisła Kraków	30	13	5	12	45	46	−1	44	Qualification for the championship round
6	Pogoń Szczecin	30	10	12	8	47	40	+7	42 (Note: Head-to-head record: Pogoń 5–0 Nieciecza, Nieciecza 2–0 Pogoń.)	Qualification for the championship round
7	Nieciecza	30	12	6	12	31	38	−7	42	Qualification for the championship round
8	Korona Kielce	30	12	3	15	39	55	−16	39 (Note: Head-to-head record: Korona 9 pts (8–8), Wisła P. 6 pts (7-8), Zagłębie 3 pts (7–6).)	Qualification for the championship round
9	Wisła Płock	30	10	9	11	42	44	−2	39	Qualification for the relegation round
10	Zagłębie Lubin	30	10	9	11	37	36	+1	39	Qualification for the relegation round
11	Śląsk Wrocław	30	8	10	12	34	45	−11	34	Qualification for the relegation round
12	Arka Gdynia	30	8	7	15	37	50	−13	31 (Note: Head-to-head record: Arka 1–0 Cracovia, Cracovia 1–1 Arka.)	Qualification for the relegation round
13	Cracovia	30	6	13	11	38	43	−5	31	Qualification for the relegation round
14	Ruch Chorzów (Note: Ruch Chorzów were punished with a deduction of four points due to financial problems.)	30	10	4	16	37	46	−9	30 (Note: Head-to-head record: Ruch 7 pts (7–3), Piast 5 pts (5-5), Górnik 4 pts (5–9).)	Qualification for the relegation round
15	Piast Gliwice	30	7	9	14	31	49	−18	30	Qualification for the relegation round
16	Górnik Łęczna	30	7	9	14	36	52	−16	30	Qualification for the relegation round

Source: Ekstraklasa, 90minut, Soccerway
Rules for classification: 1) Points; 2) Head-to-head points; 3) Head-to-head goal difference; 4) Head-to-head goals scored; 5) Head-to-head away goals scored (only if two teams); 6) Goal difference; 7) Goals scored; 8) Fairplay ranking; 9) Draw. (Note: Head-to-head record is used only after all the matches between the teams in question have been played).

=== Positions by round ===
Team ╲ Round	1	2	3	4	5	6	7	8	9	10	11	12	13	14	15	16	17	18	19	20	21	22	23	24	25	26	27	28	29	30
Jagiellonia	7	3	2	1	2	4	1	1	1	1	1	2	2	2	1	2	2	1	1	1	2	2	2	2	1	1	1	1	1	1
Legia	7	11	7	8	9	12	10	13	14	14	10	13	8	6	5	4	4	4	3	3	3	3	4	4	4	2	2	2	2	2
Lech	9	14	16	16	15	15	12	8	8	8	7	7	9	8	6	5	5	5	4	5	4	4	3	3	2	3	3	4	4	3
Lechia	11	6	4	5	3	1	4	2	2	2	3	1	1	1	2	1	1	2	2	2	1	1	1	1	3	4	4	3	3	4
Wisła K.	4	9	11	13	16	16	16	16	16	16	16	16	15	13	10	13	10	8	8	10	8	9	7	7	7	6	6	5	5	5
Pogoń	11	13	15	14	12	6	8	11	12	12	11	9	7	5	7	6	6	7	7	7	7	7	8	9	10	9	10	9	6	6
Bruk-Bet Termalica Nieciecza	3	2	5	3	5	5	5	3	3	3	2	3	3	4	4	3	3	3	5	4	6	6	6	6	6	7	7	10	7	7
Korona	16	15	13	9	13	9	6	4	7	7	8	12	16	16	13	10	8	10	10	9	10	8	10	8	8	8	8	6	8	8
Wisła P.	4	6	10	11	7	8	11	7	6	6	6	8	10	12	14	15	14	14	13	11	11	13	11	11	9	10	9	7	9	9
Zagłębie	2	1	1	2	1	2	2	5	4	4	4	4	4	3	3	7	7	6	6	6	5	5	5	5	5	5	5	8	10	10
Śląsk	9	12	6	6	10	11	7	10	10	9	12	10	11	9	8	8	9	11	11	12	13	11	12	13	14	13	11	11	11	11
Arka	14	5	3	7	4	3	3	6	5	5	5	5	5	7	9	9	11	9	9	8	9	10	9	10	11	11	12	13	14	12
Cracovia	1	4	8	4	6	7	9	11	11	11	9	6	6	10	11	11	13	13	14	14	12	12	13	12	12	15	15	14	12	13
Ruch	4	8	12	12	8	10	13	9	9	10	14	15	13	15	16	14	15	15	16	16	16	15	14	14	13	12	13	15	15	14
Piast	15	10	9	10	11	13	14	14	15	15	13	11	14	11	12	12	12	12	12	13	14	14	15	15	15	14	14	12	13	15
Górnik	11	16	14	15	14	14	15	15	13	13	15	14	12	14	15	16	16	16	15	15	15	16	16	16	16	16	16	16	16	16

=== Results ===
Home \ Away	ARK	NIE	CRA	GKL	JAG	KOR	LPO	LGD	LEG	PIA	POG	RUC	SLA	WIS	WPK	ZLU
Arka Gdynia	—	1–3	1–0	2–4	2–3	4–1	1–4	1–1	0–1	1–2	0–3	3–0	2–0	3–0	1–1	1–1
Nieciecza	2–0	—	3–2	2–1	0–0	1–3	0–0	1–1	2–1	1–0	2–0	0–0	1–2	2–3	0–0	0–1
Cracovia	1–1	1–3	—	1–1	1–3	6–0	1–1	0–1	1–2	5–1	1–1	1–1	1–0	2–1	1–0	1–1
Górnik Łęczna	0–0	3–0	0–0	—	0–2	4–0	1–2	1–2	1–0	1–0	2–2	0–4	0–3	3–1	2–3	0–1
Jagiellonia Białystok	4–1	1–0	0–0	5–0	—	4–1	2–1	0–1	1–4	2–0	0–0	4–1	4–1	2–1	1–2	1–2
Korona Kielce	1–0	0–1	3–0	2–1	1–2	—	4–1	2–0	2–4	1–1	4–1	1–0	1–2	1–0	4–2	2–1
Lech Poznań	0–0	3–0	2–1	0–0	0–2	1–0	—	1–0	1–2	2–0	3–1	3–0	3–0	1–1	2–0	0–2
Lechia Gdańsk	2–1	1–2	4–2	3–0	3–0	3–2	2–1	—	1–2	3–2	1–1	2–1	3–0	3–1	2–1	1–0
Legia Warsaw	1–3	1–1	2–0	5–0	1–1	0–0	2–1	3–0	—	0–0	2–0	1–3	0–0	1–0	2–2	2–3
Piast Gliwice	3–2	2–1	2–2	3–3	0–1	1–0	0–3	1–1	1–5	—	0–2	2–1	1–1	1–2	2–1	0–0
Pogoń Szczecin	5–1	5–0	1–1	1–1	0–0	1–1	0–3	3–1	3–2	2–1	—	2–1	0–2	6–2	1–1	1–1
Ruch Chorzów	1–2	0–1	0–1	2–1	1–2	4–0	0–5	2–1	0–2	0–0	1–2	—	2–0	1–0	2–2	1–2
Śląsk Wrocław	0–2	1–2	2–2	2–2	0–4	3–0	0–0	0–0	0–4	3–4	1–1	1–2	—	1–0	0–0	2–1
Wisła Kraków	5–1	2–0	1–1	3–2	3–1	2–0	0–0	3–0	0–0	1–0	2–1	1–2	1–5	—	3–2	1–0
Wisła Płock	0–0	1–0	4–1	1–2	1–0	1–2	0–3	2–1	2–3	0–0	2–0	4–3	1–1	2–3	—	2–1
Zagłębie Lubin	1–0	2–0	1–1	0–0	3–4	4–0	0–3	1–2	1–3	2–1	1–1	0–1	1–1	2–2	1–2	—

Source: 90minut.pl
Legend: Blue = home team win; Yellow = draw; Red = away team win.
For upcoming matches, an "a" indicates there is an article about the rivalry between the two participants.

== Play-offs ==
=== Championship round ===
==== League table ====
Pos	Team	Pld	W	D	L	GF	GA	GD	Pts	Qualification
1	Legia Warsaw (C)	37	21	10	6	70	31	+39	44	Qualification for the Champions League second qualifying round
2	Jagiellonia Białystok	37	21	8	8	64	39	+25	42 (Note: Regular season record: Jagiellonia 59 pts, Lech 55 pts, Lechia 53 pts.)	Qualification for the Europa League first qualifying round
3	Lech Poznań	37	20	9	8	62	29	+33	42	Qualification for the Europa League first qualifying round
4	Lechia Gdańsk	37	20	8	9	57	37	+20	42	
5	Korona Kielce	37	14	5	18	47	65	−18	28	
6	Wisła Kraków	37	14	6	17	54	57	−3	26	
7	Pogoń Szczecin	37	11	13	13	51	54	−3	25 (Note: Regular season record: Pogoń 42 pts, Nieciecza 42 pts. Head-to-head record: Pogoń 5–0 Nieciecza, Nieciecza 2–0 Pogoń.)	
8	Bruk-Bet Termalica Nieciecza	37	13	7	17	35	55	−20	25	

Source: Ekstraklasa, 90minut
Rules for classification: 1) Points; 2) Points in regular season; 3) Head-to-head points in regular season; 4) Head-to-head goal difference in regular season; 5) Head-to-head goals scored in regular season; 5) Head-to-head away goals scored in regular season (if only two teams); 7) Goal difference; 8) Goals scored; 9) Fairplay ranking; 10) Play-off (only if needed to decide champion, teams for relegation or teams for UEFA competitions).
(C) Champions

==== Positions by round ====
Team ╲ Round	30	31	32	33	34	35	36	37
Legia	2	3	3	3	1	1	1	1
Jagiellonia	1	1	1	1	2	2	2	2
Lech	3	2	2	2	3	3	3	3
Lechia	4	4	4	4	4	4	4	4
Korona	8	8	8	6	5	5	5	5
Wisła K.	5	5	5	5	6	6	6	6
Pogoń	6	6	6	7	7	7	7	7
Nieciecza	7	7	7	8	8	8	8	8

==== Results ====
Home \ Away	JAG	LEG	LPO	LGD	WIS	POG	NIE	KOR
Jagiellonia Białystok	—	0–0	2–2	—	2–0	1–0	—	—
Legia Warsaw	—	—	2–0	0–0	1–1	—	6–0	—
Lech Poznań	—	—	—	0–0	2–1	2–0	—	3–2
Lechia Gdańsk	4–0	—	—	—	—	4–0	2–0	0–0
Wisła Kraków	—	—	—	0–1	—	4–0	1–2	—
Pogoń Szczecin	—	0–2	—	—	—	—	1–1	3–0
Nieciecza	1–2	—	0–3	—	—	—	—	0–2
Korona Kielce	1–1	0–1	—	—	3–2	—	—	—

Source: 90minut.pl
Legend: Blue = home team win; Yellow = draw; Red = away team win.
For upcoming matches, an "a" indicates there is an article about the rivalry between the two participants.

=== Relegation round ===
==== League table ====
Pos	Team	Pld	W	D	L	GF	GA	GD	Pts	Qualification
9	Zagłębie Lubin	37	14	11	12	51	45	+6	34	
10	Piast Gliwice	37	12	10	15	45	54	−9	31	
11	Śląsk Wrocław	37	12	10	15	49	52	−3	29	
12	Wisła Płock	37	12	11	14	49	57	−8	28	
13	Arka Gdynia	37	10	9	18	44	60	−16	24 (Note: Regular season record: Arka 31 pts, Cracovia 31 pts. Head-to-head record: Arka 1–0 Cracovia, Cracovia 1–1 Arka.)	Qualification for the Europa League third qualifying round (Note: Arka Gdynia qualified for the Europa League third qualifying round by winning the 2016–17 Polish Cup.)
14	Cracovia	37	8	15	14	45	52	−7	24	
15	Górnik Łęczna (R)	37	9	10	18	47	63	−16	22	Relegation to I liga
16	Ruch Chorzów (R)	37	10	8	19	42	62	−20	19	Relegation to I liga

Source: Ekstraklasa, 90minut
Rules for classification: 1) Points; 2) Points in regular season; 3) Head-to-head points in regular season; 4) Head-to-head goal difference in regular season; 5) Head-to-head goals scored in regular season; 5) Head-to-head away goals scored in regular season (if only two teams); 7) Goal difference; 8) Goals scored.
(R) Relegated

==== Positions by round ====
Team ╲ Round	30	31	32	33	34	35	36	37
Zagłębie	10	10	10	10	10	9	9	9
Piast	15	15	12	14	11	11	11	10
Śląsk	11	12	14	12	14	13	12	11
Wisła P.	9	9	9	9	9	10	10	12
Arka	12	13	15	13	15	15	14	13
Cracovia	13	14	11	11	12	12	13	14
Górnik	16	11	13	15	13	14	15	15
Ruch	14	16	16	16	16	16	16	16

==== Results ====
Home \ Away	WPK	ZLU	SLA	ARK	CRA	RUC	PIA	GKL
Wisła Płock	—	1–2	0–3	—	1–1	1–1	—	—
Zagłębie Lubin	—	—	2–0	1–3	2–2	—	3–1	—
Śląsk Wrocław	—	—	—	4–1	2–0	6–0	—	0–2
Arka Gdynia	0–1	—	—	—	—	1–1	1–1	1–0
Cracovia	—	—	—	2–0	—	2–0	0–1	—
Ruch Chorzów	—	1–1	—	—	—	—	0–3	2–2
Piast Gliwice	4–0	—	2–0	—	—	—	—	2–1
Górnik Łęczna	2–3	1–3	—	—	3–0	—	—	—

Source: 90minut.pl
Legend: Blue = home team win; Yellow = draw; Red = away team win.
For upcoming matches, an "a" indicates there is an article about the rivalry between the two participants.

== Season statistics ==
=== Top goalscorers ===
Rank	Player	Club	Goals
1	(Portugal) Marco Paixão	Lechia Gdańsk	18
1	(Poland) Marcin Robak	Lech Poznań	18
3	(Estonia) Konstantin Vassiljev	Jagiellonia Białystok	13
4	(Poland) Rafał Boguski	Wisła Kraków	12
4	(Lithuania) Fiodor Černych	Jagiellonia Białystok	12
4	(Poland) Adam Frączczak	Pogoń Szczecin	12
4	(Hungary) Nemanja Nikolić	Legia Warsaw	12
4	(Poland) Krzysztof Piątek	Zagłębie Lubin (1); Cracovia (11)	12
9	(Poland) Kamil Biliński	Śląsk Wrocław	11
9	(Serbia) Miroslav Radović	Legia Warsaw	11
9	(Poland) Rafał Siemaszko	Arka Gdynia	11

=== Top assists ===
Rank	Player	Club	Assists
1	(Estonia) Konstantin Vassiljev	Jagiellonia Białystok	13
2	(Belgium) Vadis Odjidja-Ofoe	Legia Warsaw	12
3	(Hungary) Ádám Gyurcsó	Pogoń Szczecin	10
4	(Japan) Ryota Morioka	Śląsk Wrocław	9
4	(Poland) Filip Starzyński	Zagłębie Lubin	9
4	(Poland) Piotr Tomasik	Jagiellonia Białystok	9
7	(Poland) Krzysztof Janus	Zagłębie Lubin	8
7	(Switzerland) Darko Jevtić	Lech Poznań	8
7	(Poland) Radosław Majewski	Lech Poznań	8
7	(Poland) Maciej Makuszewski	Lech Poznań	8
7	(Poland) Sławomir Peszko	Lechia Gdańsk	8
7	(Serbia) Miroslav Radović	Legia Warsaw	8
7	(Poland) Rafał Wolski	Lechia Gdańsk	8

== Attendances ==
Pos	Team	Total	High	Low	Average	Change
1	Legia Warsaw	389,898	28,842	12,173	20,455	−3.4%
2	Lech Poznań	372,995	41,026	9,591	19,631	+17.1%
3	Lechia Gdańsk	329,745	37,220	10,095	17,355	+35.4%
4	Wisła Kraków	251,545	30,218	8,483	13,980	+14.2%
5	Jagiellonia Białystok	256,373	22,394	5,531	13,493	+31.9%
6	Śląsk Wrocław	172,666	22,004	4,001	9,089	+4.0%
7	Cracovia	139,281	14,000	0	7,723	−10.4%
8	Arka Gdynia	147,071	14,029	1,915	7,720	n/a^{1}
9	Korona Kielce	129,824	15,000	4,354	7,212	+9.2%
10	Zagłębie Lubin	119,701	10,892	3,827	6,300	+6.2%
11	Ruch Chorzów	109,439	9,010	0	6,053	−15.6%
12	Pogoń Szczecin	104,585	9,876	2,545	5,810	−15.0%
13	Wisła Płock	101,602	9,750	2,117	5,348	n/a^{1}
14	Piast Gliwice	91,131	8,219	3,875	5,062	−20.4%
15	Nieciecza	66,588	4,595	2,084	3,693	+14.1%
16	Górnik Łęczna	65,664	9,248	1,401	3,648	−13.9%
	League total	2,848,108	41,026	0	9,622	+5.7%

Source: 90minut.pl (in Polish)
Notes:
1: Team played last season in I liga

== Awards ==
=== Monthly awards ===
==== Player of the Month ====
Month	Player	Club
July 2016	(Estonia) Konstantin Vassiljev	Jagiellonia Białystok
August 2016	(Poland) Kamil Drygas	Pogoń Szczecin
September 2016	(Poland) Przemysław Frankowski	Jagiellonia Białystok
October 2016	(Estonia) Konstantin Vassiljev	Jagiellonia Białystok
November 2016	(Belgium) Vadis Odjidja-Ofoe	Legia Warsaw
February 2017	(Poland) Dawid Kownacki	Lech Poznań
March 2017	(Spain) Gerard Badía	Piast Gliwice
April 2017	(Republic of Ireland) Cillian Sheridan	Jagiellonia Białystok

=== Annual awards ===
Award	Player	Club
Player of the Season	(Belgium) Vadis Odjidja-Ofoe	Legia Warsaw
Goalkeeper of the Season	(Slovakia) Matúš Putnocký	Lech Poznań
Defender of the Season	(Poland) Maciej Dąbrowski	Zagłębie Lubin; Legia Warsaw
Midfielder of the Season	(Belgium) Vadis Odjidja-Ofoe	Legia Warsaw
Forward of the Season	(Poland) Marcin Robak	Lech Poznań
Coach of the Season	(Poland) Maciej Bartoszek	Korona Kielce
Top Scorers of the Season	(Poland) Marcin Robak	Lech Poznań
Top Scorers of the Season	(Portugal) Marco Paixão	Lechia Gdańsk
Discovery of the Season	(Poland) Jarosław Niezgoda	Ruch Chorzów
Turbokozak	(Poland) Radosław Majewski	Lech Poznań

Team of the Year
Goalkeeper	(Slovakia) Matúš Putnocký (Lech Poznań)			
Defenders	(Poland) Bartosz Rymaniak (Korona Kielce)	(Poland) Mateusz Wieteska (Górnik Zabrze)	(Poland) Michał Pazdan (Legia Warsaw)	(Poland) Maciej Sadlok (Wisła Kraków)
Midfielders	(Poland) Rafał Wolski (Lechia Gdańsk)	(Switzerland) Darko Jevtić (Lech Poznań)		(Poland) Rafał Kurzawa (Górnik Zabrze)
Forwards	(Spain) Carlos López (Wisła Kraków)	(Poland) Marcin Robak (Lech Poznań)		(Spain) Igor Angulo (Górnik Zabrze)

== See also ==
- 2016–17 I liga
