= Centrum Królewska =

Office building in Warsaw, Poland

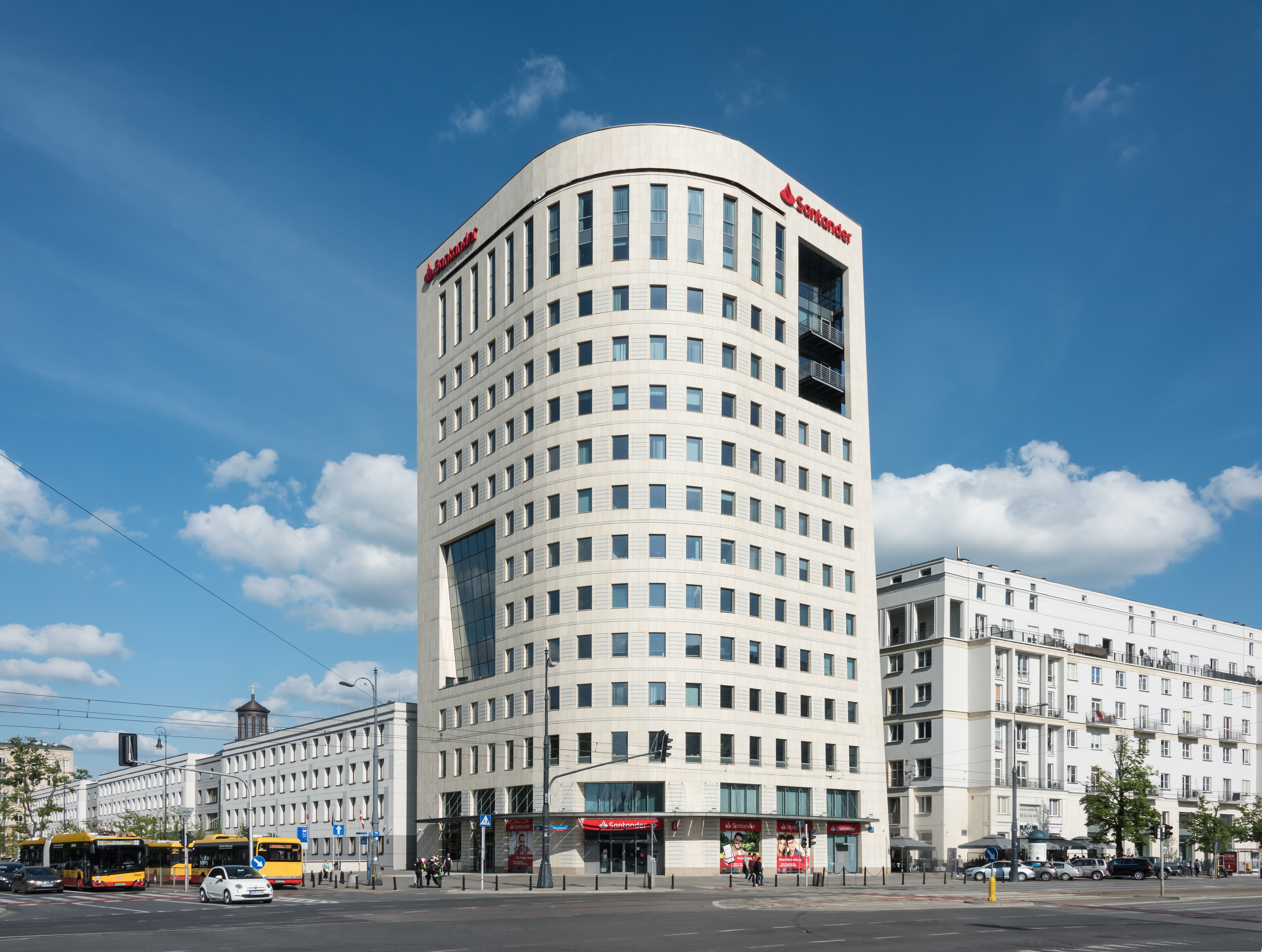
- The Centrum Królewska in 2021

General information
- Type: Office building
- Location: Warsaw, Poland, 142 Marszałkowska Street
- Coordinates: 52°14′17″N 21°00′27″E
- Construction started: 1990
- Completed: 2002
- Owner: Rezydent

Height
- Tip: 54 m (170.6 ft)

Technical details
- Floor count: 14
- Floor area: 10,964 m^{2} (118,015.51 sq ft)

Design and construction
- Architect: Stefan Kuryłowicz
- Architecture firm: Kuryłowicz & Associates
- Developer: Rezydent

Centrum Królewska (Polish: [ˈt͡sɛn.trum kruˈlɛf.ska]; lit. 'Royal Street Centre') is an office building in the city of Warsaw in Masovian Voivodeship, Poland, located at 142 Marszałkowska Street, at the crossing with Królewska Street. It was opened in 2002.

== History ==
Centrum Królewska was designed by Stefan Kuryłowicz with the architecture firm Kuryłowicz & Associates, and constructed between 1999 and 2002. It was built at 142 Marszałkowska Street, in place of the former headquarters building of the travel agency company Orbis, which was deconstructed in 1999. The building was developed and is owned by the company Rezydent. In 2018, the stone tiles on its façade were replaced with ceramic sinter tiles.

== Characteristics ==
Centrum Królewska is an office building messuring 14 storeys with a total height of 54 m (170.6 ft), and a total floor area of 10,964 m^{2} (118,015.51 sq ft). Its façade is covered with ceramic sinter tiles. The building houses the embassy of Denmark.
