= Adrian Stawski =

Polish football manager (born 1978)

Personal information
- Date of birth: 26 December 1978 (age 47)
- Place of birth: Bytów, Poland

Team information
- Current team: Zawisza Bydgoszcz (manager)

Senior career*
Years	Team	Apps	(Gls)
- Urania Udorpie

Managerial career
- 2004–2011: Urania Udorpie
- 2017–2020: Bytovia Bytów
- 2021–2022: Stomil Olsztyn
- 2024–: Zawisza Bydgoszcz
- * Club domestic league appearances and goals

Adrian Stawski (born 26 December 1978) is a Polish professional football manager and former player who is currently in charge of II liga club Zawisza Bydgoszcz.

== Career ==
Stawski started his managerial career with Polish seventh division side Urania Udorpie in 2004, helping them achieve promotion to the Polish sixth division. In 2017, Stawski was appointed manager of Bytovia Bytów in the Polish second division, where he suffered relegation to the Polish third division.

On 24 June 2021, Stawski was appointed head coach of Stomil Olsztyn on a one-year contract. On 22 March 2022, he was dismissed from his post.

In June 2024, Stawski was announced as the new manager of III liga club Zawisza Bydgoszcz ahead of the 2024–25 season. Stawski led Zawisza to winning the regional Polish Cup final against Wda Świecie on 4 May 2025, which qualified Zawisza for the next season's main competition. In the 2025–26 Polish Cup, Zawisza reached the semi-finals after defeating GKS Tychy, GKS Wikielec, Wisła Kraków and Chojniczanka Chojnice before being eliminated by eventual winners Górnik Zabrze. On 23 May 2026, Zawisza beat Wikęd Luzino 2–0 to win group II of the III liga and secure their return to the third tier of Polish football after a 15-year absence.

== Managerial statistics ==
As of match played 30 May 2026

Managerial record by team and tenure
Team	From	To	Record							
Team	From	To	G	W	D	L	GF	GA	GD	Win %
Bytovia Bytów	20 March 2017	16 December 2020	144	45	46	53	191	209	−18	31.25
Stomil Olsztyn	24 June 2021	22 March 2022	26	7	2	17	26	47	−21	26.92
Zawisza Bydgoszcz	1 July 2024	Present	81	52	15	14	189	69	+120	64.20
Total			251	104	63	84	406	325	+81	41.43

== Honours ==
Zawisza Bygdoszcz

- III liga, group II: 2025–26
- Polish Cup (Kuyavia-Pomerania regionals): 2024–25
