= Łucka City =

Skyscraper in Warsaw

Coordinates: 52.2317°N 20.9881°E

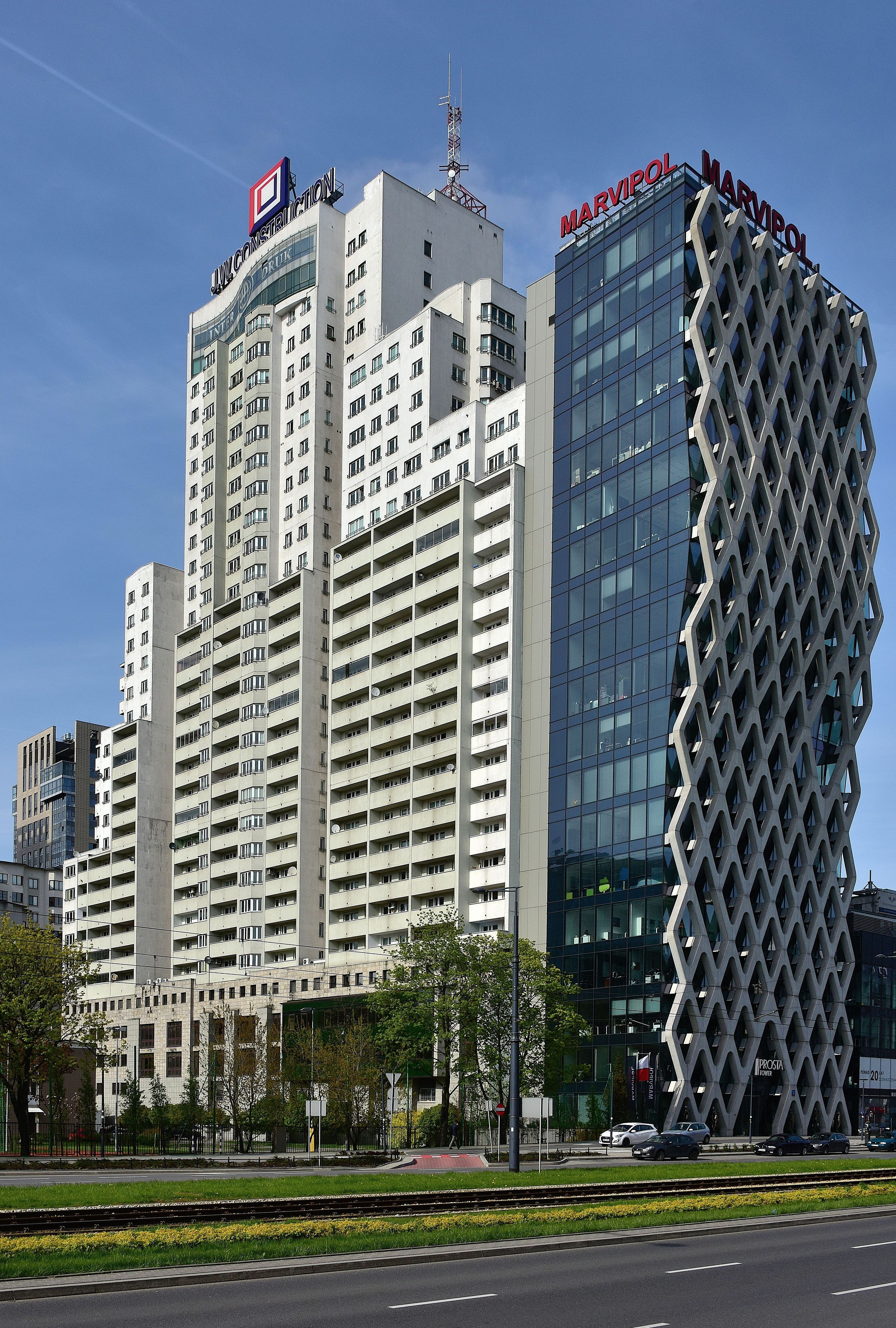
Łucka City

Łucka City is a skyscraper in Warsaw, Poland. It is 120m tall. It has been called "the ugliest skyscraper in Poland." It adjoins Prosta Tower.
