= Maciej Bartoszek =

Polish football manager

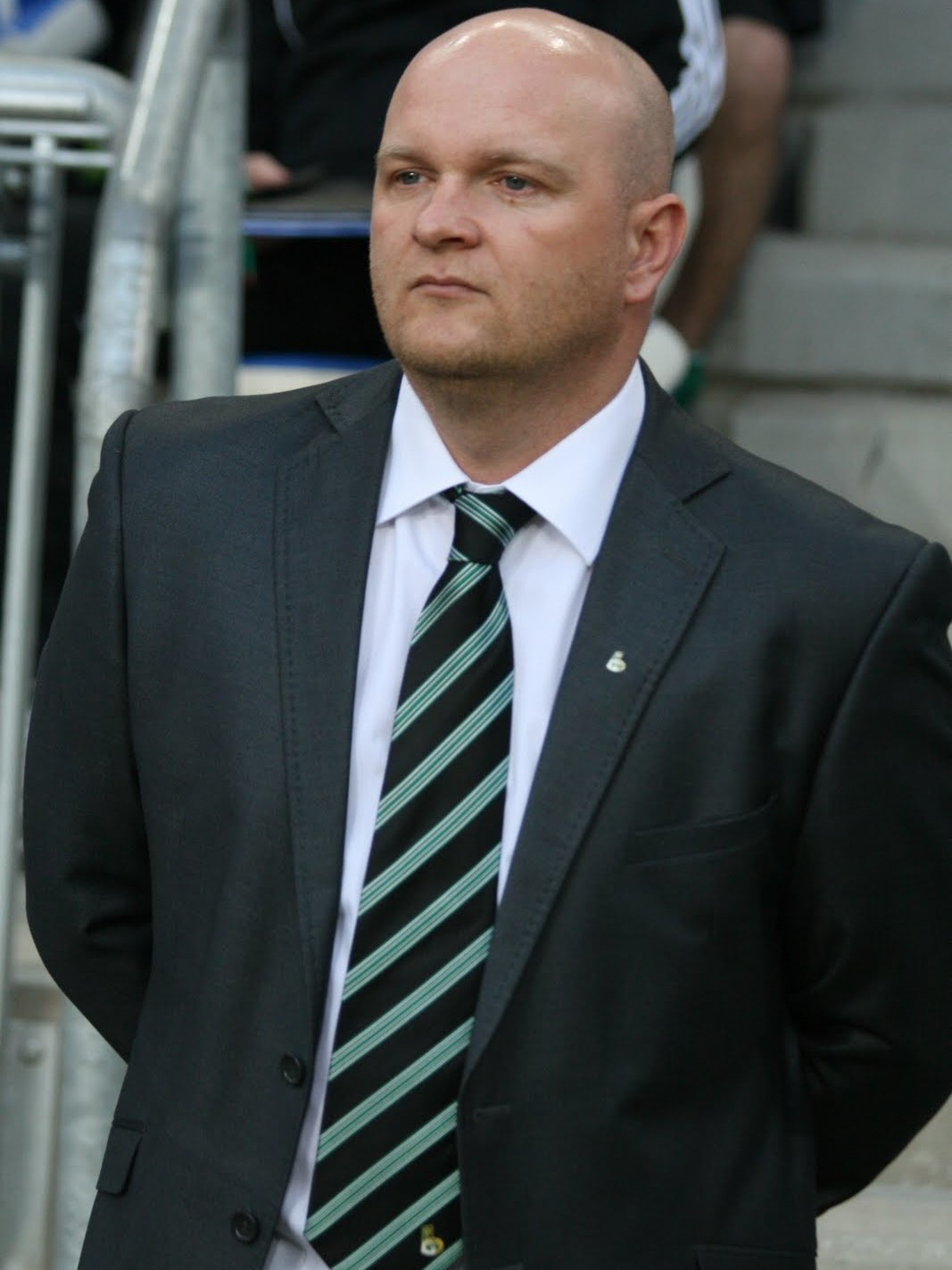
- Bartoszek as manager of GKS Bełchatów

Personal information
- Full name: Maciej Bartoszek
- Date of birth: 12 April 1977 (age 49)
- Place of birth: Włocławek, Poland

Managerial career
- Years: Team
- 2004–2006: Zdrój Ciechocinek
- 2006: Kania Gostyń
- 2006–2007: Unia Janikowo
- 2007–2008: Zdrój Ciechocinek
- 2008–2009: Legia Chełmża
- 2009: Zdrój Ciechocinek
- 2009–2010: GKS Bełchatów (ME)
- 2010–2011: GKS Bełchatów
- 2014: Pelikan Łowicz
- 2015: Legionovia Legionowo
- 2015–2016: Zawisza Bydgoszcz
- 2016: Chojniczanka Chojnice
- 2016–2017: Korona Kielce
- 2017–2018: Bruk-Bet Termalica Nieciecza
- 2018–2019: Chojniczanka Chojnice
- 2020–2021: Korona Kielce
- 2021–2022: Wisła Płock
- 2023–2024: Kotwica Kołobrzeg

Maciej Bartoszek (born 12 April 1977) is a Polish professional football manager who was most recently in charge of Kotwica Kołobrzeg.

== Honours ==
Zdrój Ciechocinek

- IV liga Kuyavia-Pomerania: 2004–05
- Polish Cup (Włocławek regionals): 2004–05

Individual

- Ekstraklasa Coach of the Season: 2016–17
