= Zawisza Bydgoszcz =

Sports club in Poland

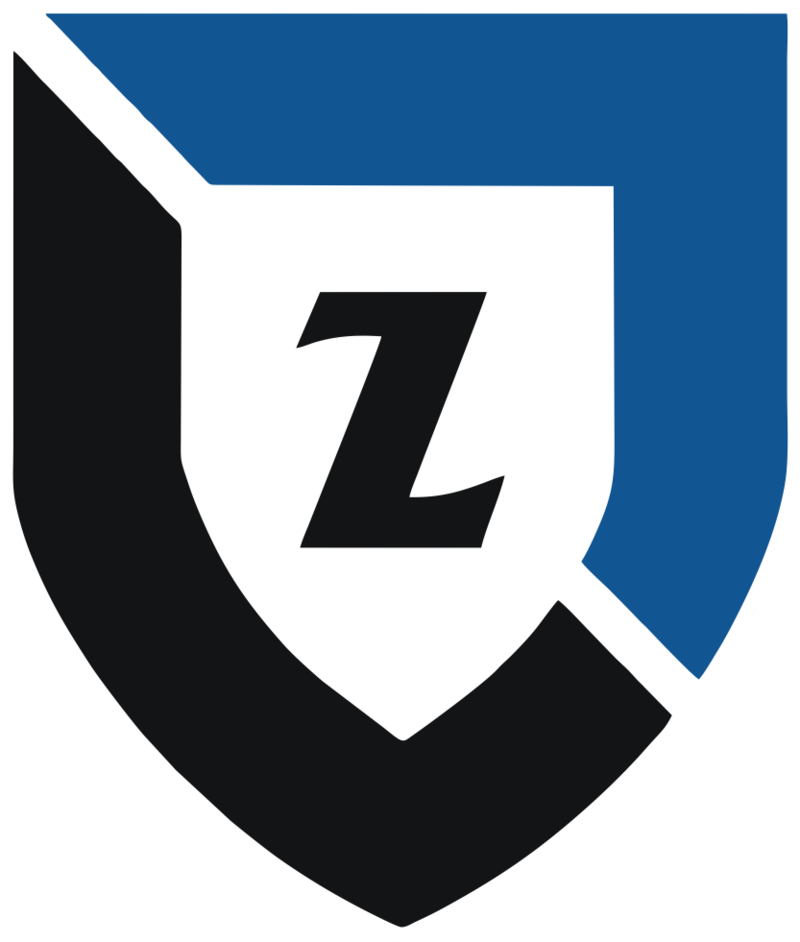
- Full name: Stowarzyszenie Piłkarskie „Zawisza” z siedzibą w Bydgoszczy
- Nicknames: Wojskowi (The Militarians); Niebiesko-Czarni (The Blue and Blacks); Rycerze Pomorza (Knights of Pomerania)
- Founded: 1946; 80 years ago
- Ground: Stadion Miejski im. Zdzisława Krzyszkowiaka
- Capacity: 20,559
- Chairman: Krzysztof Bess
- Manager: Adrian Stawski
- League: II liga
- 2025–26: III liga, group II, 1st of 18 (promoted)
- Website: zawiszabydgoszcz.pl
Home colours	Away colours

Zawisza Bydgoszcz (Polish pronunciation: [zaˈviʂa ˈbɨdɡɔʂt͡ʂ]) is a sports club from Bydgoszcz, Poland, founded in 1946. Its name commemorates a legendary Polish 15th-century knight, Zawisza Czarny (Zawisza the Black). The club holds many sections: football, track and field athletics, boxing, rowing, canoeing, weightlifting, gymnastics, shooting, and parachuting ones.

Their football team currently competes in the II liga, the third tier of national football league system.

== History ==
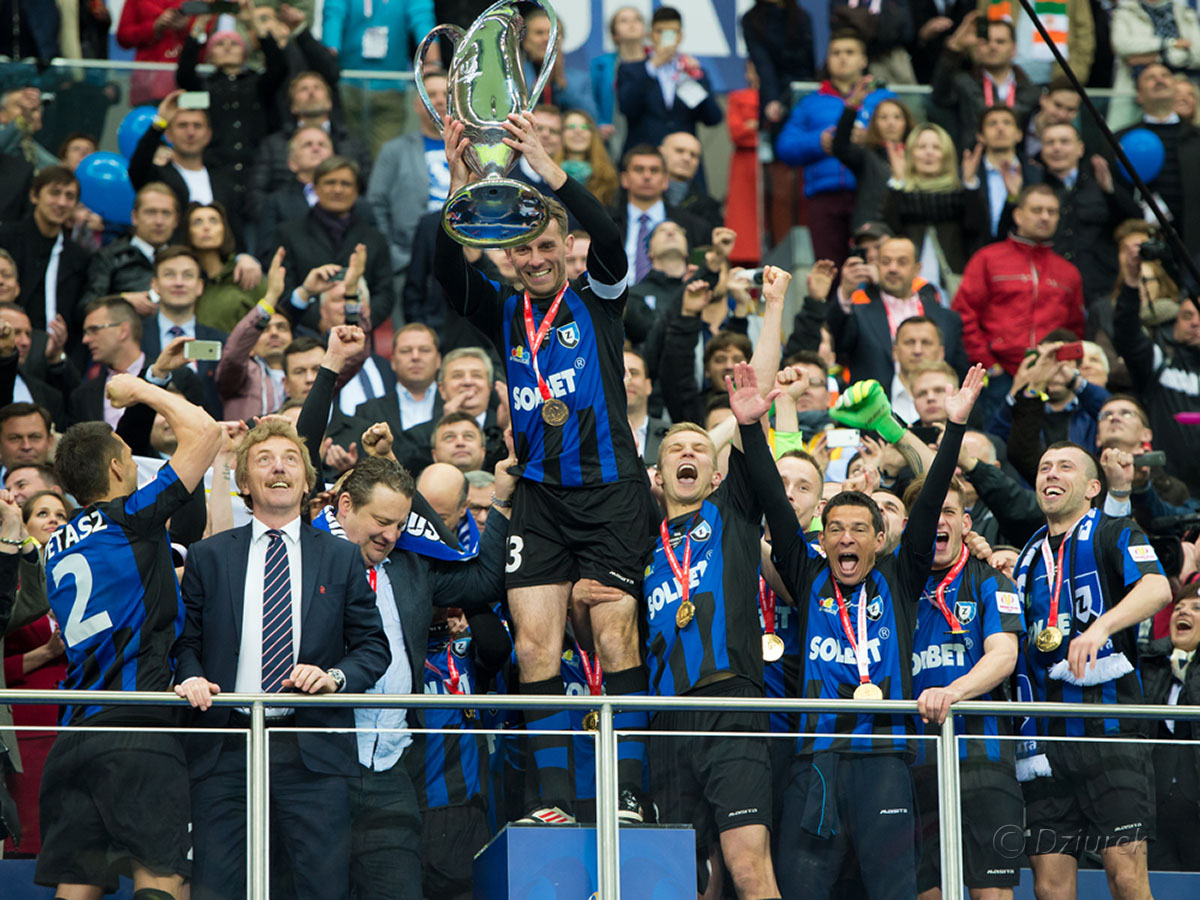
Zawisza celebrate winning the 2013–14 Polish Cup

The team was founded in 1946, as a military-sponsored club in Koszalin, although they only played friendly matches initially. When the army headquarters moved to Bydgoszcz a year later in 1947, the club followed.

The football team has achieved some successes, playing for several years in the Polish top-flight, first winning promotion in 1961. Zawisza's under-19 team won the national youth championship in 1981.

They reached the semi-finals of the Polish Cup in 1991 and competed in the 1993 Intertoto Cup.

Zawisza was relegated from the second level to the fourth in the 1997–98 season. In 2001, they controversially merged with Chemik Bydgoszcz, and played as Chemik-Zawisza, whilst the reserve team was initially meant to be called Zawisza-Chemik, although ultimately the reserve team remained as simply "Zawisza". The merger turned out to be very unsuccessful, and the senior side started anew from the bottom of the league pyramid, reverting to "Chemik" and leaving the reserve team in the fifth division, which subsequently became Zawisza's senior team.

Aside from the ongoing Hydrobudowa scandal between 2006 and 2008, the original team were promoted to the second tier after finishing first in their regional group of the III liga in the 2007–08 season. On 12 June 2011, after a 13-year absence, Zawisza was promoted to the I liga after finishing second 5 points behind Olimpia Grudziądz in the II liga West Group in the 2010–11 season. In 2013, Zawisza won the I liga and were promoted to the Ekstraklasa.

They won the Polish Cup in the 2013–14 season, 6–5 on penalties after a goalless 120 minutes against Zagłębie Lubin, and qualified for the UEFA Europa League second qualifying round.

After the club had finished 5th in 2015–16 I liga, it did not receive a license for the following season due to financial problems and dissolved. The refounded club SP Zawisza started the 2016–17 season in Klasa B, grupa Bydgoszcz III which is in the 8th tier of Polish football.

=== Hydrobudowa ===
Zawisza Bydgoszcz SA was a club that was created when Kujawiak Włocławek were moved to Bydgoszcz and renamed by Hydrobudowa, their owners. The original Zawisza Bydgoszcz continued playing in the fourth division. however the new club had a very similar logo and an identical name. As a result, Kujawiak, Zawisza and supporters all over the country boycotted the relocated team. The reserve team continued to play under the name Kujawiak Włocławek in the Fourth Polish league.

The club lasted two seasons in the second division, before it folded in 2007 as a result of serious corruption allegations and widespread condemnation.

== Crest ==
Zawisza's crest has changed several times.

Zawisza Bydgoszcz logo history
1946–50
2014–16 (minor variations over the years)

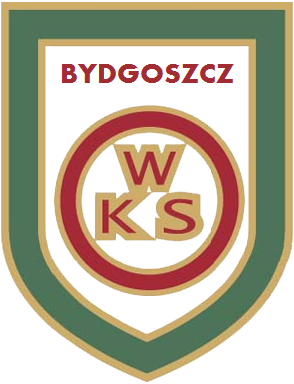
1950–54

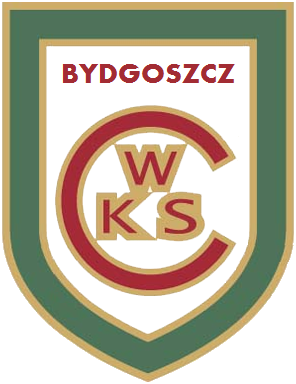
1954–57

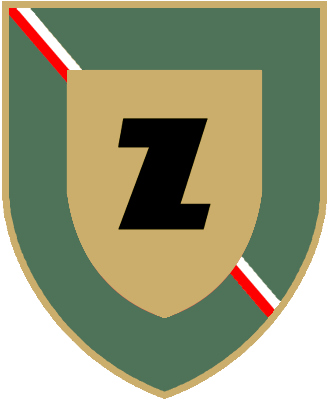
1957–76

2003–14
2016– (minor proportional variations over the years)

== Supporters ==
The fan movement at Zawisza started in the 1970s, one of the first clubs with organised support in the country. Since then club has always attracted a large support considering its relative lack of success. The club enjoys support from around Cuiavia, with fan-clubs in several other major towns, most notably in Inowrocław, Janikowo, Nakło and Mogilno, among several others.

The fans have good relations with fans of ŁKS Łódź, GKS Tychy, Zagłębie Lubin and Górnik Wałbrzych. Their arch-rivals are fellow locals Polonia Bydgoszcz, with whom they contest the Bydgoszcz Derby, and regional rivals Elana Toruń, with whom they play the Cuiavian Derby, with the Toruń and Bydgoszcz rivalry between the two cities one which goes even beyond sport.

=== Protests ===
The club's alternate logo

In the 21st century, the Zawisza fans have encountered numerous challenges from owners, city council, politicians and the media, frequently battling against them for public support.

First they opposed the controversial merger with Chemik Bydgoszcz in 2001, choosing to boycott the new merged club (which turned out to be hugely unsuccessful) and support the reserve team which still played under the Zawisza name.

In 2006, the fans opposed the new relocated Zawisza, again opting to continue to support the original team made up of the reserve squad. When the "new Zawisza" failed to win any trophies and was embroiled in a match-fixing scandal, subsequently folding, the fans triumphantly announced victory against the media and politicians who supported it.

In 2008, the fans protested against the city council which was insistent on renaming the newly rebuilt stadium as the "Municipal Stadium", with the fans claiming that to omit any link to Zawisza was unfair.

In 2014, the fans began to boycott matches after a match against Widzew Łódź. The fans claim that the police assaulted fans, when preventing Zawisza and ŁKS Łódź fans from entering the stadium. Following the incident, the fans asked to see the security footage, however, the footage was claimed to be lost due to an alleged "technical fault". The club chairman, Radosław Osuch, and a large portion of the media and public opinion, attributed the incident to football hooliganism. The players supported the chairman, sparking fury from the fans. Osuch threatened to relocate the club, and has openly declared war against the fans He changed the club crest to the similar crest used by the relocated Zawisza in 2006, further angering the fans. Since 2014, the boycott has been upheld, meaning that there has been low attendances and support during matches, including the historic Polish Cup win. In January 2015, a group of fans broke into the stadium and placed 15 coffins on the pitch, depicting 14 players and the chairman, and a banner with the words "Osuch's whore spares, you are morally dead", as a protest against the chairman and the players. The club issued a criminal investigation into the incident. In May 2015, after Górnik Łęczna keeper Sergiusz Prusak displayed a T-shirt showing his support to the Zawisza fans, the Zawisza fans decided to break their boycott for one match only to come and thank him in a match against Górnik. In order to prevent the fans from coming to Zawisza, Osuch subsequently raised the match ticket price to a very high 200zł in order to stop the fans attending. After 5 years, Osuch decided to leave the club, however upon this announcement the players and staff also all resigned. Without investment, the club was disbanded by Osuch as last act, stating that there is a poor atmosphere surrounding Polish football. The fans reformed the club and had to start the new season from the lowest level on the football pyramid.

== Ground ==
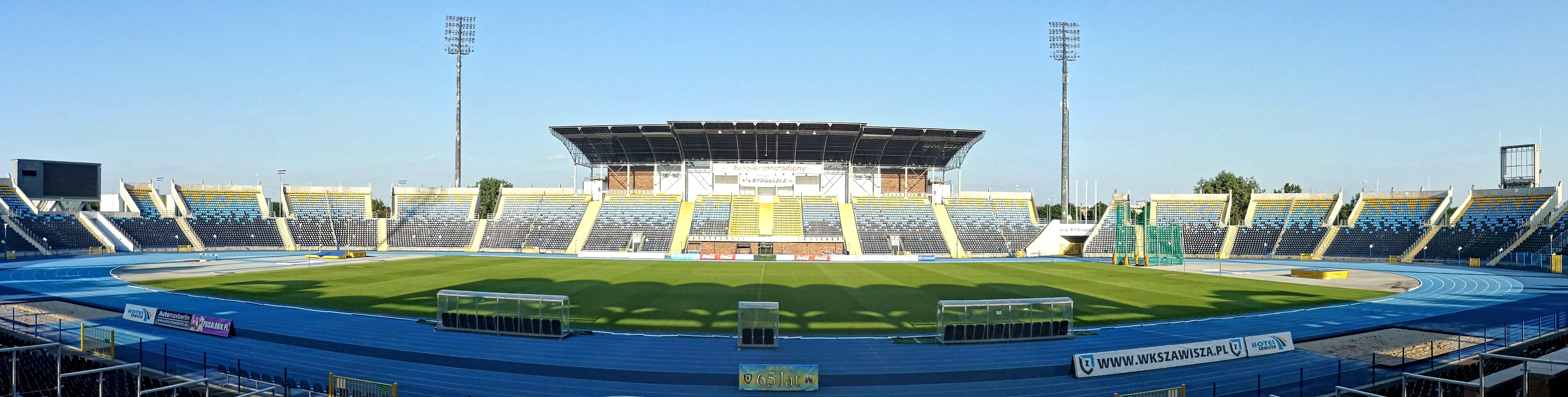
Stadion Miejski im. Zdzisława Krzyszkowiaka

== Honours ==
- Polish Cup
  - Winners: 2013–14
- Polish Super Cup
  - Winners: 2014

== European record ==
Season	Competition	Round	Opponent	Home	Away	Aggregate/Position
1993	Intertoto Cup	Group stage (Group 1)	(Austria) Rapid Wien	1–1	—N/a	2nd
1993	Intertoto Cup	Group stage (Group 1)	(Sweden) Halmstads BK	—N/a	1–2	2nd
1993	Intertoto Cup	Group stage (Group 1)	(Denmark) Brøndby IF	6–1	—N/a	2nd
1993	Intertoto Cup	Group stage (Group 1)	(Bulgaria) Yantra Gabrovo	—N/a	0–0	2nd
2014–15	UEFA Europa League	Second qualifying round	(Belgium) Zulte Waregem	1–3	1–2	2–5

== Players ==
=== Current squad ===
As of 8 October 2026

Note: Flags indicate national team as defined under FIFA eligibility rules; some limited exceptions apply. Players may hold more than one non-FIFA nationality.

No.	Pos.	Nation	Player
1	GK	POL	Michał Oczkowski
2	DF	POL	Mikołaj Dziarkowski
3	DF	POL	Mariusz Sławek
4	DF	POL	Sebastian Golak
6	MF	POL	Radosław Kanach
7	FW	POL	Michał Kalitta
8	MF	POL	Kacper Bogusiewicz
9	FW	POL	Filip Kozłowski
10	MF	POL	Maciej Kona (captain)
11	MF	POL	Sebastian Rak
13	DF	POL	Jan Juśkiewicz (on loan from Widzew Łódź II)
15	DF	POL	Krystian Brzozowski (on loan from Motor Lublin)
16	MF	POL	Gabriel Pietruszkiewicz

No.	Pos.	Nation	Player
17	MF	POL	Mateusz Stępień
21	MF	POL	Wojciech Szumilas
22	DF	POL	Marcel Strzyżewski
23	DF	POL	Kacper Nowak
24	DF	POL	Mikołaj Staniak
27	MF	POL	Bartosz Kuśmierczyk (on loan from Pogoń Szczecin II)
46	MF	POL	Tymon Wojciechowski
77	MF	POL	Michał Cywiński
90	FW	POL	Maciej Mas
99	MF	POL	Łukasz Szramowski
—	GK	POL	Ksawery Kostrzewski
—	MF	POL	Kacper Kowalkowski
—	MF	POL	Jakub Łukowski

=== Out on loan ===
Note: Flags indicate national team as defined under FIFA eligibility rules; some limited exceptions apply. Players may hold more than one non-FIFA nationality.

No.	Pos.	Nation	Player
14	MF	POL	Antoni Prałat (at Chemik Bydgoszcz until 31 December 2026)
—	MF	POL	Filip Marciniak (at Cuiavia Inowrocław until 31 December 2026)

No.	Pos.	Nation	Player
—	GK	POL	Kamil Krawczyk (at Cuiavia Inowrocław until 31 December 2026)

=== Notable players ===
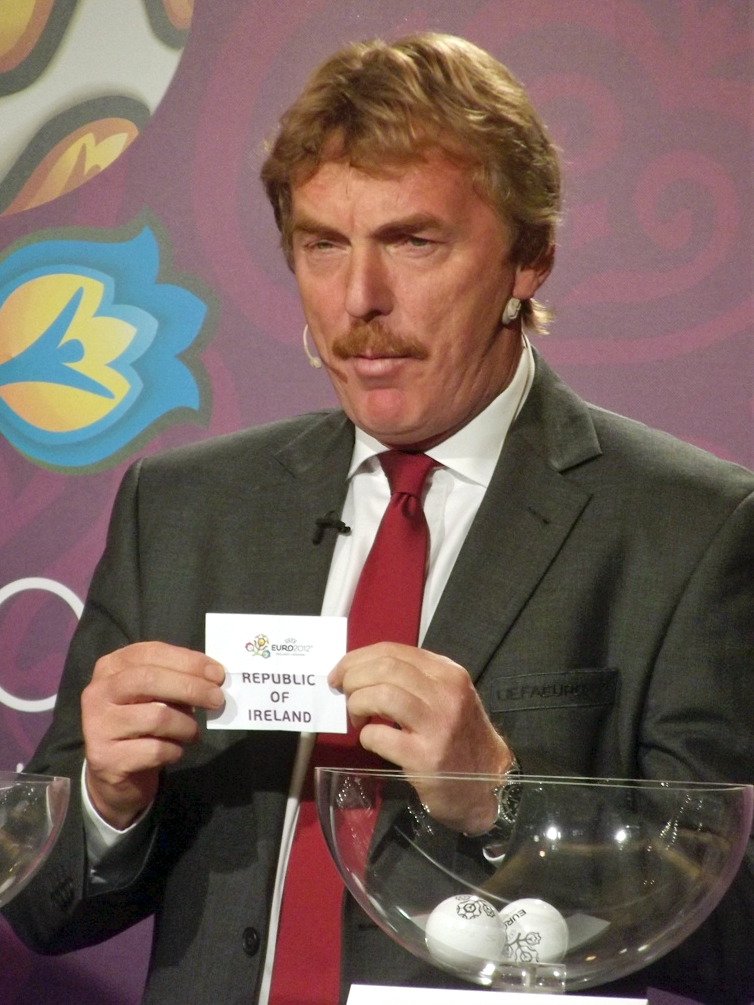
Zbigniew Boniek, former player and Polish Football Association president

Internationally capped players

- (Poland) Zbigniew Boniek
- (Poland) Paweł Kryszałowicz
- (Poland) Wojciech Łobodziński
- (Poland) Adam Majewski
- (Poland) Stefan Majewski
- (Poland) Piotr Nowak
- (Poland) Sławomir Wojciechowski
- (Poland) Michał Masłowski
- (Poland) Igor Lewczuk

== Managers ==
- (Poland) Antoni Brzeżańczyk (1 July 1957 – 30 June 1958)
- (Poland) Edward Brzozowski (1963–64)
- (Poland) Bronisław Waligóra (1971–72), (1974–75)
- (Poland) Wojciech Łazarek (1 July 1978–79)
- (Poland) Władysław Stachurski (1 April 1988 – 30 June 1990)
- (Poland) Adam Topolski (1 May 1991 – 30 June 1992)
- (Poland) Leszek Jezierski (1992)
- (Poland) Bogusław Kaczmarek (1 July 1993 – 31 Dec 1993)
- (Poland) Bronisław Waligóra (1995–96)
- (Poland) Zbigniew Franiak (1 July 1996 – 1 April 1997)
- (Poland) Ryszard Lukasik (10 Feb 2007 – 11 April 2007)
- (Poland) Piotr Tworek (11 April 2007 – 14 March 2009)
- (Poland) Mariusz Kuras (29 March 2009 – 30 June 2010)
- (Poland) Maciej Murawski (1 July 2010 – 9 April 2011)
- (Poland) Adam Topolski (14 April 2011 – 22 June 2011)
- (Poland) Janusz Kubot (22 June 2011 – 18 April 2012)
- (Ukraine) Yuriy Shatalov (19 April 2012 – 26 April 2013)
- (Poland) Ryszard Tarasiewicz (27 April 2013 – 17 June 2014)
- (Portugal) Jorge Paixão (24 June 2014 – 30 August 2014)
- (Poland) Mariusz Rumak (1 September 2014 – 8 September 2015)
- (Poland) Maciej Bartoszek (1 October 2015 – 7 January 2016)
- (Poland) Zbigniew Smółka (8 January 2016 – 12 June 2016)
- (Poland) Patryk Zarosa & Dawid Niezbecki (2016)
- (Poland) Patryk Zarosa (2017 – 30 June 2017)
- (Poland) Jacek Łukomski (1 July 2017 – 2019)
- (Poland) Przemysław Dachtera (2019 – 2021)
- (Poland) Piotr Kołc (19 January 2021 – 30 June 2024)
- (Poland) Adrian Stawski (1 July 2024 – present)
