= Prosta Tower =

Coordinates: 52°13′52″N 20°59′17″E

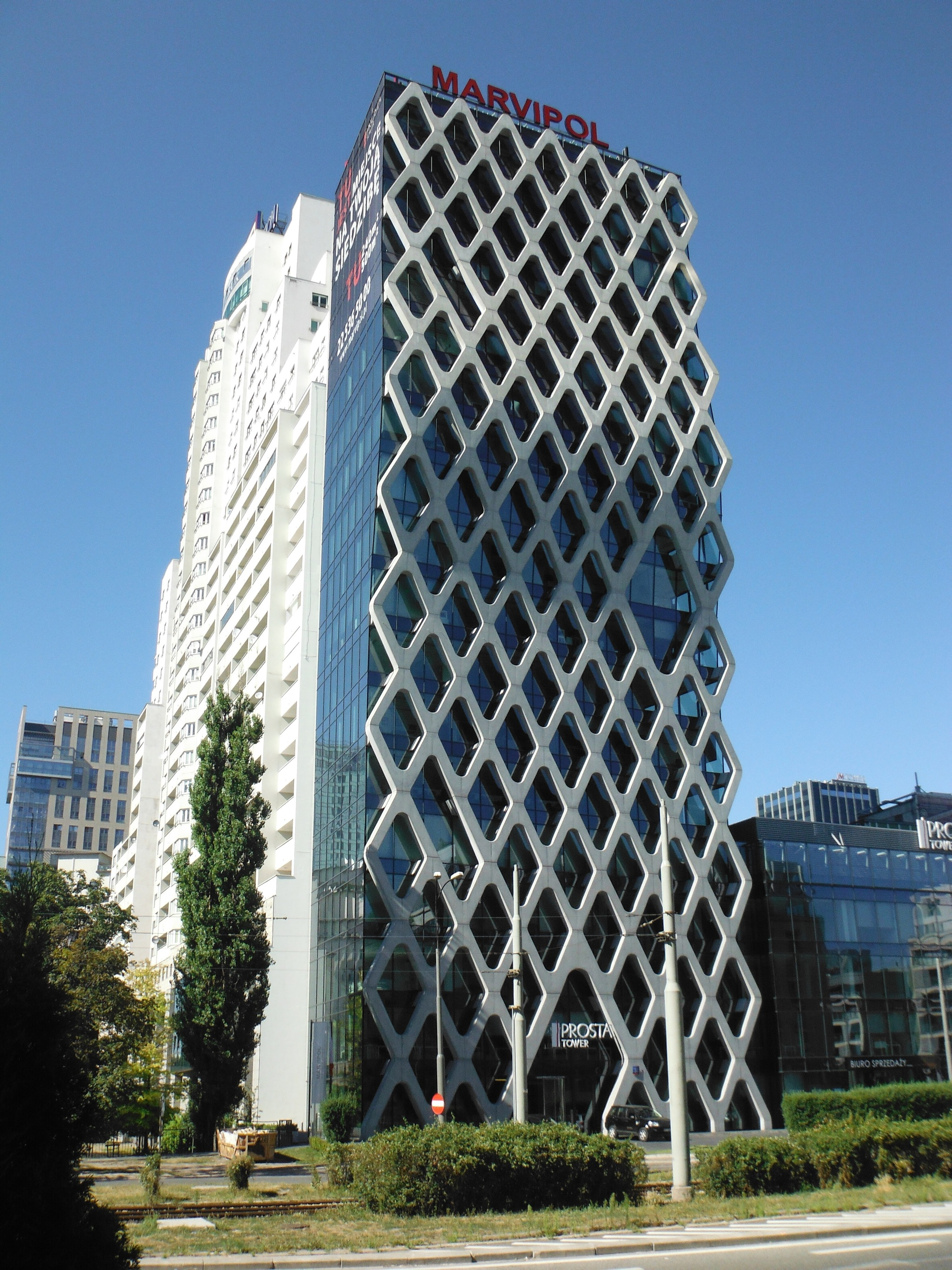
- Interactive map of the Prosta Tower area

General information
- Type: Office building
- Location: Warsaw, Poland, ul. Prosta 32
- Construction started: 2007
- Completed: 2011

Height
- Height: 70m

Technical details
- Floor count: 19+5
- Floor area: 5350m²

Design and construction
- Architecture firm: Autorska Pracownia Architektury Kuryłowicz & Associates

Prosta Tower is an office building located in Wola, Warsaw.

== History ==
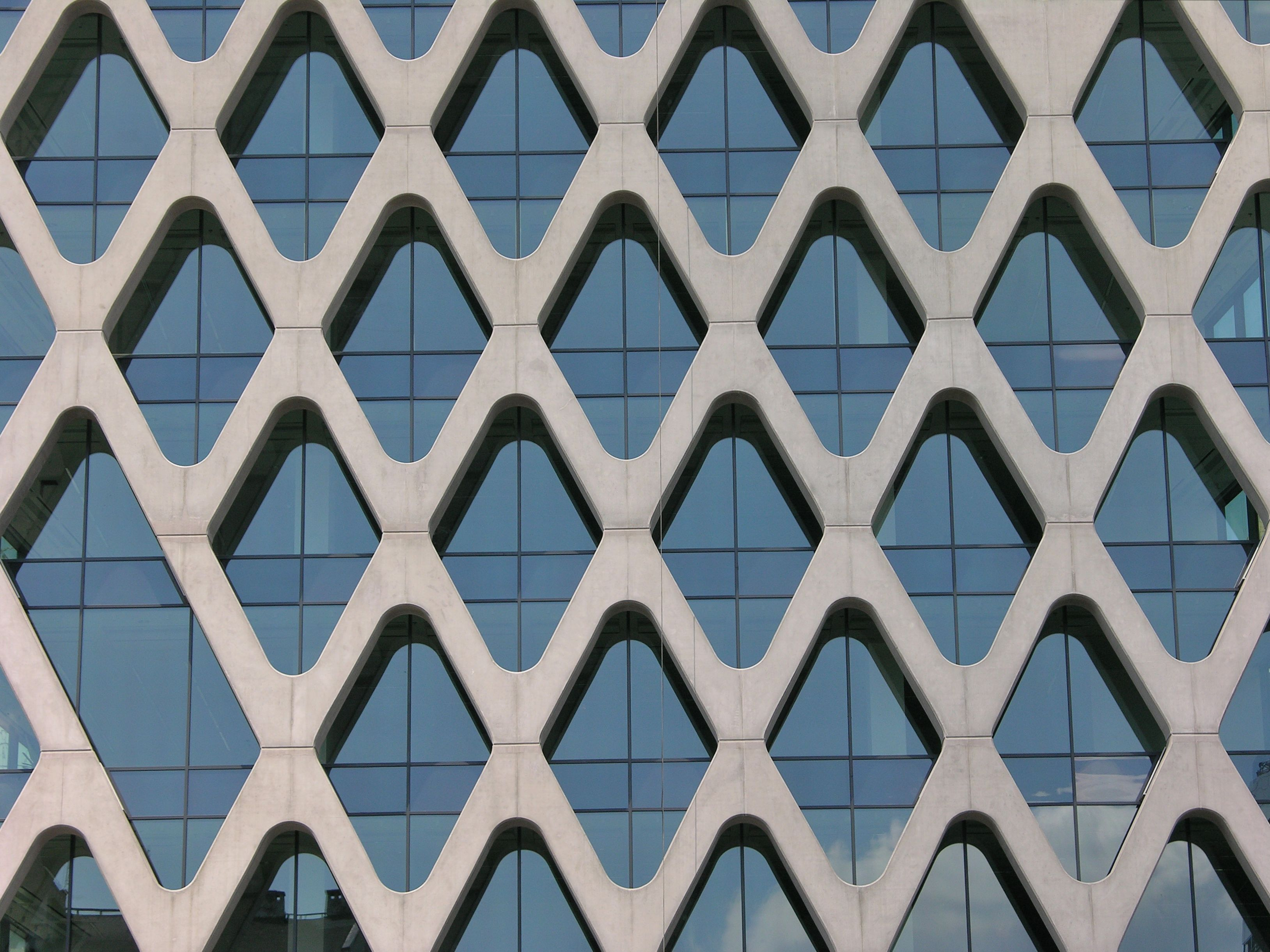
The building's facade.

Building permits were obtained in 2006, and construction began in 2007 and ended in September 2011. Prosta Tower has 19 floors above ground and has a 5 floor car park underground. It adjoins the northern side of Łucka City, which is a pairing system unique to Poland and is rarely seen elsewhere. The building was designed by Stefan Kuryłowicz. Initially, the project was a residential building, but the investor, Marvipol, made it become an office building because of the 2008 financial crisis. Because of this decision, the building gained its characteristic openwork facade, which also limits sun exposure inside the building by around 40%.
