= Sławomir Nazaruk =

Polish footballer and manager

Personal information
- Full name: Sławomir Nazaruk
- Date of birth: 6 February 1975 (age 51)
- Place of birth: Parczew, Poland
- Height: 1.74 m (5 ft 9 in)
- Position: Midfielder

Senior career*
Years	Team	Apps	(Gls)
1993	Victoria Parczew		
1993–2000	Górnik Łęczna	126	(45)
2000–2002	Śląsk Wrocław	56	(9)
2002–2003	Wisła Płock	23	(1)
2003–2004	Widzew Łódź	22	(1)
2004–2011	Górnik Łęczna	144	(24)

Managerial career
- 2011–2017: Górnik Łęczna (technical director)
- 2016: Górnik Łęczna (assistant)
- 2016: Górnik Łęczna (caretaker)
- 2017–2019: Górnik Łęczna (assistant)
- 2017–2018: Górnik Łęczna (caretaker)
- 2018: Górnik Łęczna (caretaker)
- 2019–2021: Wisła Płock (assistant)
- 2022–2023: Stal Rzeszów (assistant)
- * Club domestic league appearances and goals

Sławomir Nazaruk (born 6 February 1975) is a Polish former professional footballer who most recently served as the assistant manager of Stal Rzeszów.

== Career ==
=== Club ===
He announced his retirement on 30 May 2011.

== Honours ==
Górnik Łęczna

- III liga, gr. IV: 2007–08
