= Stefan Kuryłowicz =

Polish architect (1949–2011)

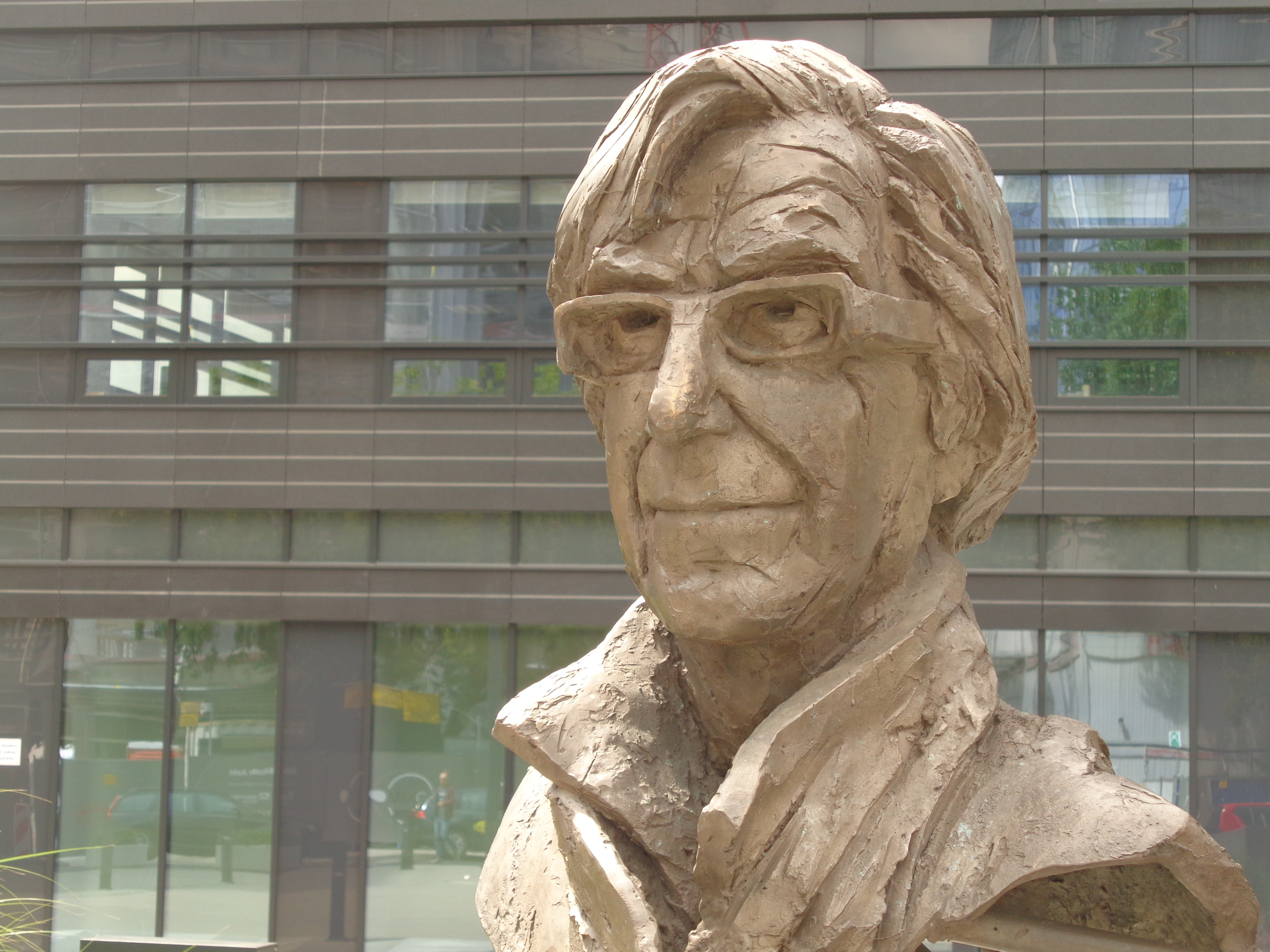
- Stefan Kuryłowicz statue in Warsaw
- Born: March 26, 1949; Warsaw, Poland
- Died: June 6, 2011 (aged 62); Asturias, Spain
- Education: Warsaw University of Technology
- Occupation: Architect
- Practice: Kuryłowicz & Associates
- Buildings: Prosta Tower; Vitkac Department Store; National Forum of Music; Białystok Municipal Stadium; Modlin Airport
- Website: apaka.com.pl

Stefan Kuryłowicz (26 March 1949 – June 6, 2011) was a Polish architect and professor who is widely credited with transforming the architecture and skyline of Warsaw, Poland, in the twenty years following the collapse of Communism in 1989. Media reports have called Kuryłowicz "one of the most influential Polish architects." He and the late architect Jacek Syropolski created the architecture company, Kurylowicz & Associates.

== Biography ==
Kuryłowicz was born in Warsaw in 1949. He earned a degree in architecture from the Warsaw University of Technology in 1972. He opened an architectural studio in 1983 during an era when the Communist-ruled government of the People's Republic of Poland openly discouraged free expression and creativity.

The end of communism in Poland in 1989 left Warsaw and other cities with littered with unimaginative, Communist-era buildings and other structures. Kuryłowicz and his associate architects began designing and constructing a series of new, modern buildings throughout Warsaw over the next two decades, largely transforming parts of Warsaw, as well as other cities, such as Gdańsk. His style of modern architecture initially attracted some criticism, but Kurylowicz's critics faded as his buildings were constructed. Kurylowicz's projects included commercial, industrial and residential buildings. His work has been credited with modernizing Warsaw during the post-Communist era. Jerzy Grochulski, the president of the Association of Polish Architects, said about Kurylowicz, "He helped shape the way Warsaw looks today." Kuryłowicz's firm is currently constructing a municipal studio in Białystok and the Wolf Bracka department store.

In addition to his architectural practice, Kuryłowicz taught architecture at Warsaw University of Technology and served as the deputy leader of the Association of Polish Architects. He was also picked as one of the international architects chosen to oversee renovations on the United Nations Headquarters in New York City.

Winner of SARP Honorary Award in 2003.

=== Death ===
Stefan Kuryłowicz died in a light airplane crash in Asturias, northern Spain, on 6 June 2011, at the age of 62. Kuryłowicz was flying in a convoy of three small airplanes en route from San Sebastián, Spain, to the Portuguese town of Vilar de Luz, near Porto, when the accident occurred. The airplanes encountered inclement weather, including rain and fog, during the flight. One airplane crashed into a parking lot at an airport in Asturias, while the second crashed into a hill near the same airport. Kurylowicz, his associate architect Jacek Syropolski, and two other people were killed in the accident. The third airplane, carrying two people, landed safely at an airport in Santander, Cantabria.

Kuryłowicz was survived by his wife Ewa Kuryłowicz, a board member of his architectural firm; and two sons.

== Examples of Kurylowicz's designs ==
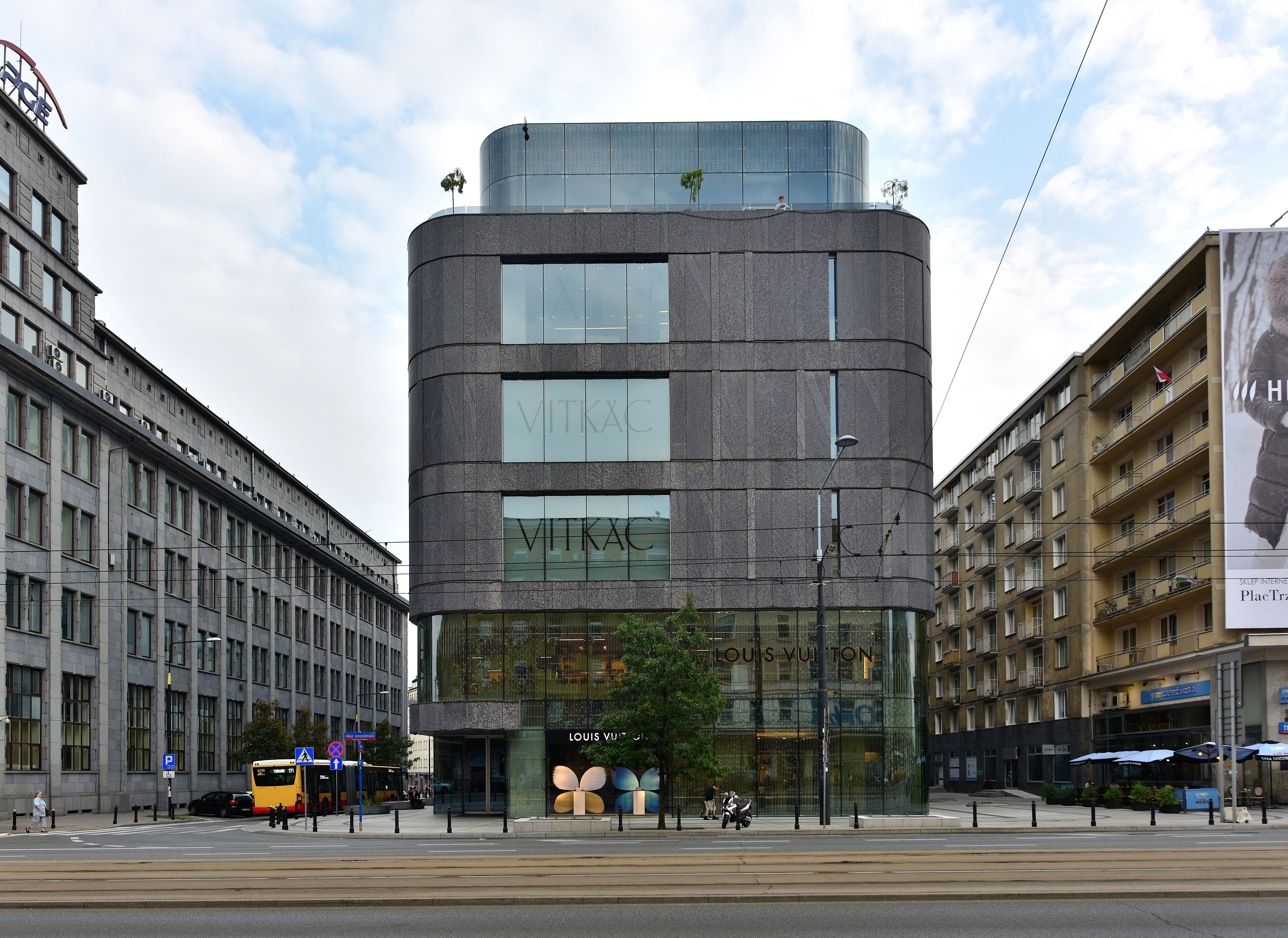
Vitkac, a luxury department store, Warsaw

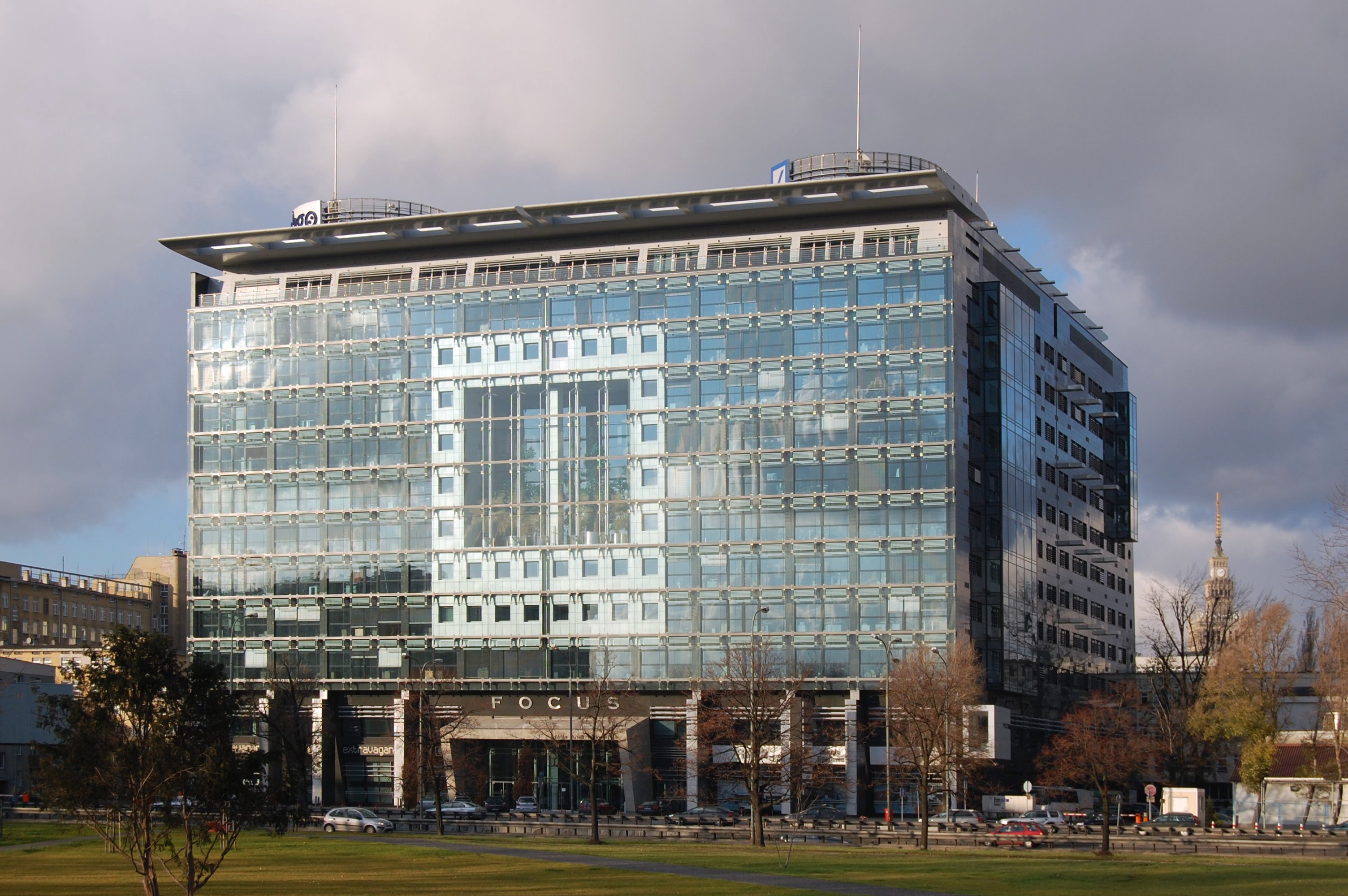
The Focus building in Warsaw

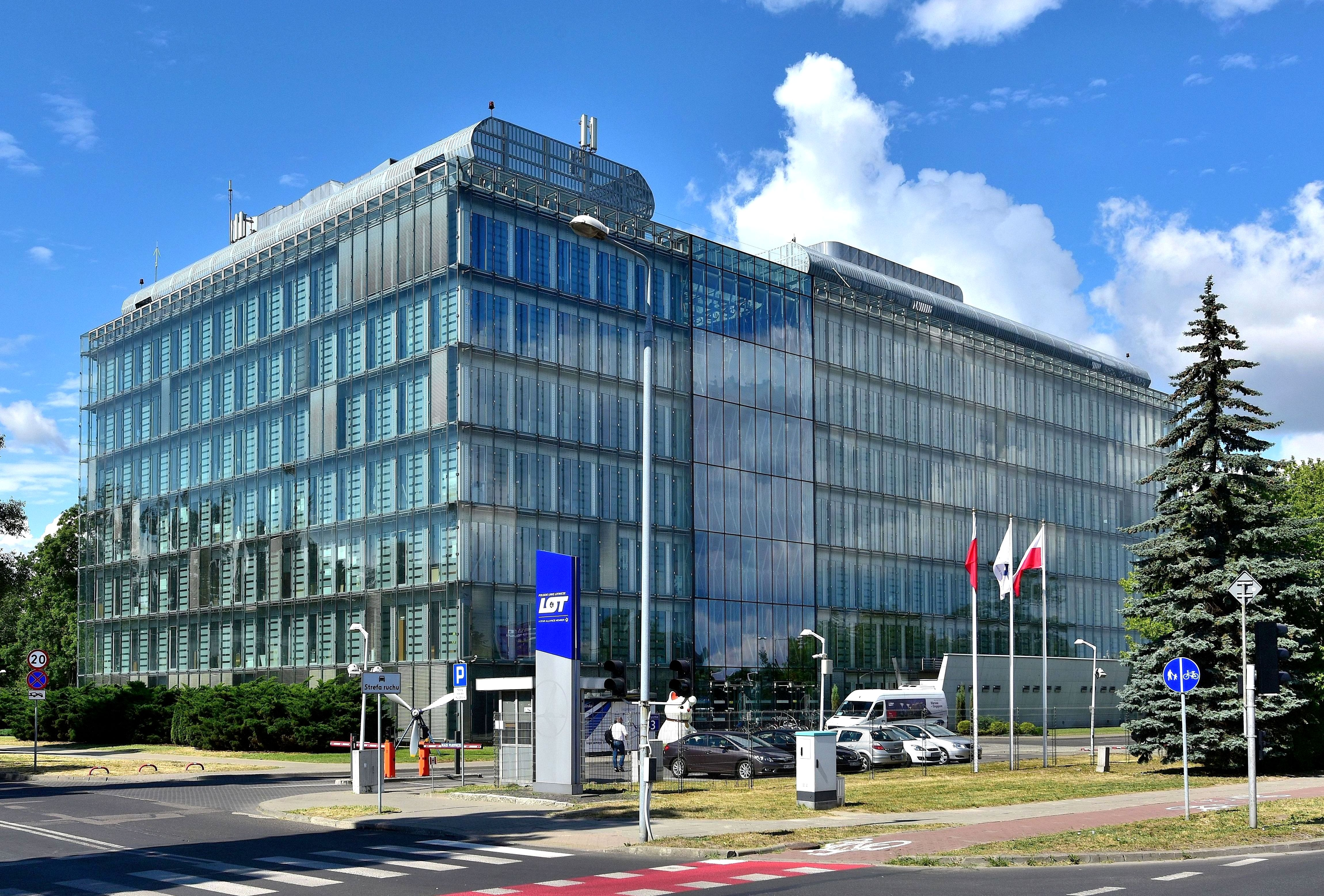
LOT Polish Airlines headquarters in Warsaw

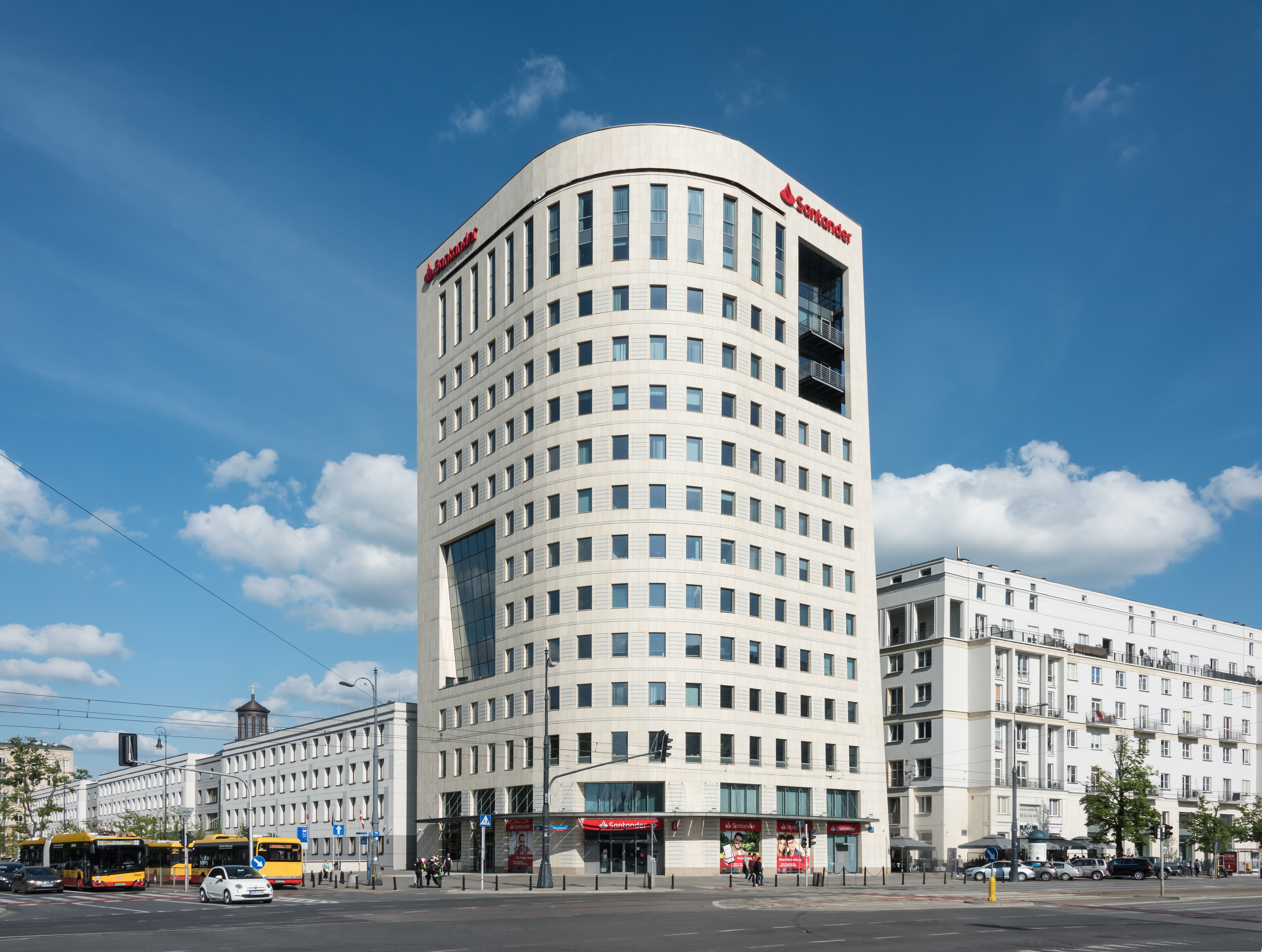
The Centrum Królewska office building

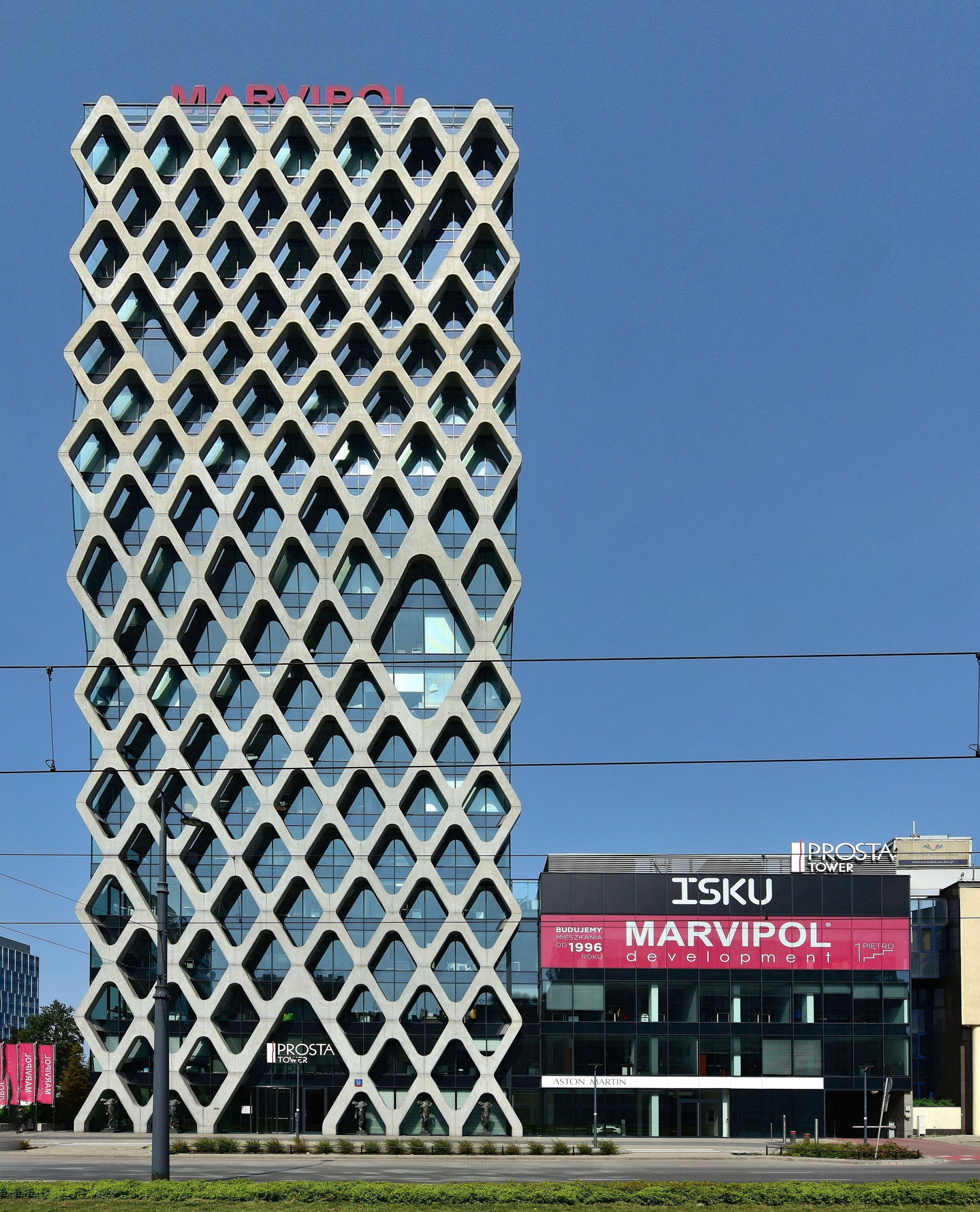
Prosta Tower, opened in November 2010

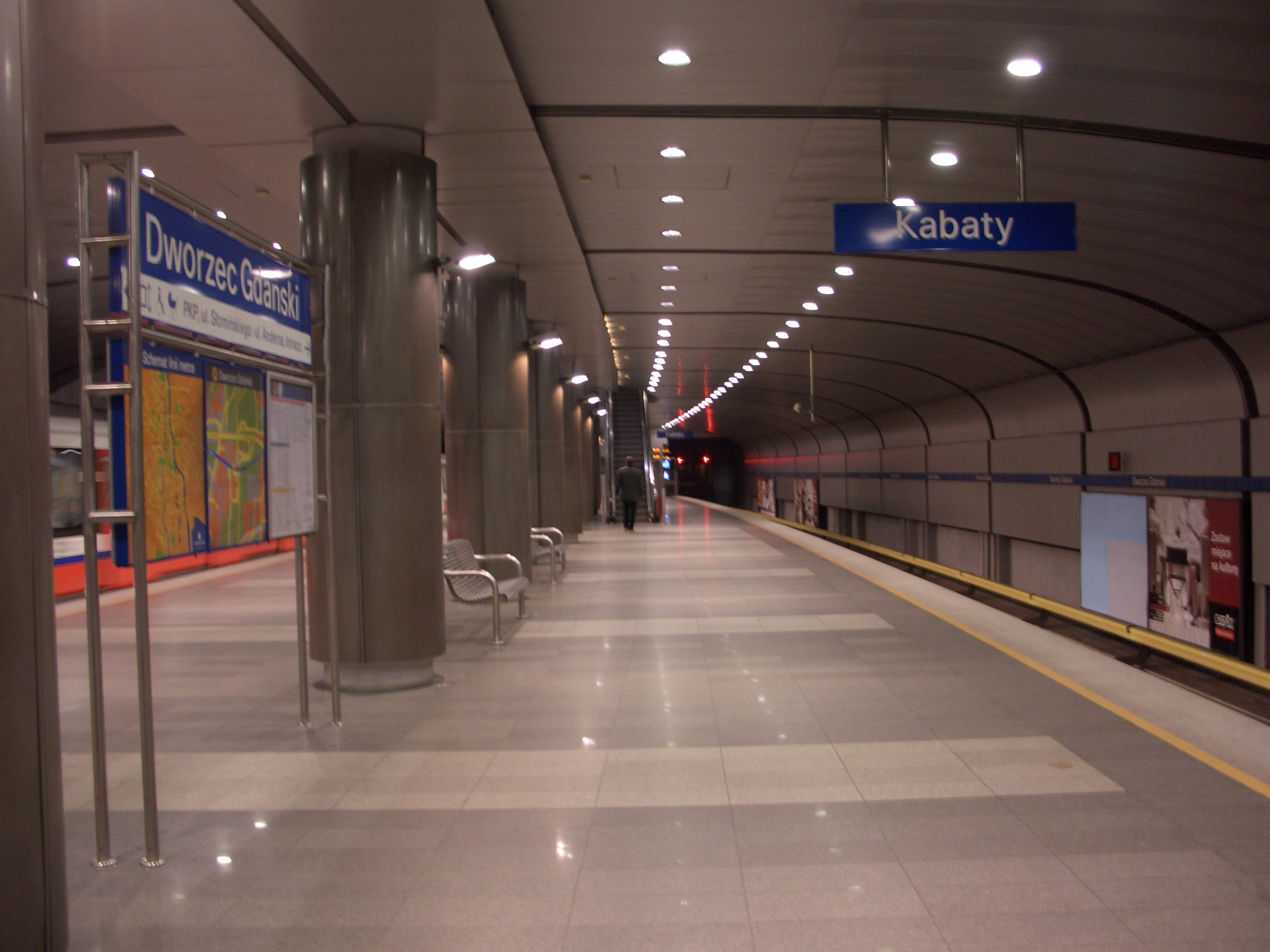
The Gdański Station in the Warsaw Metro

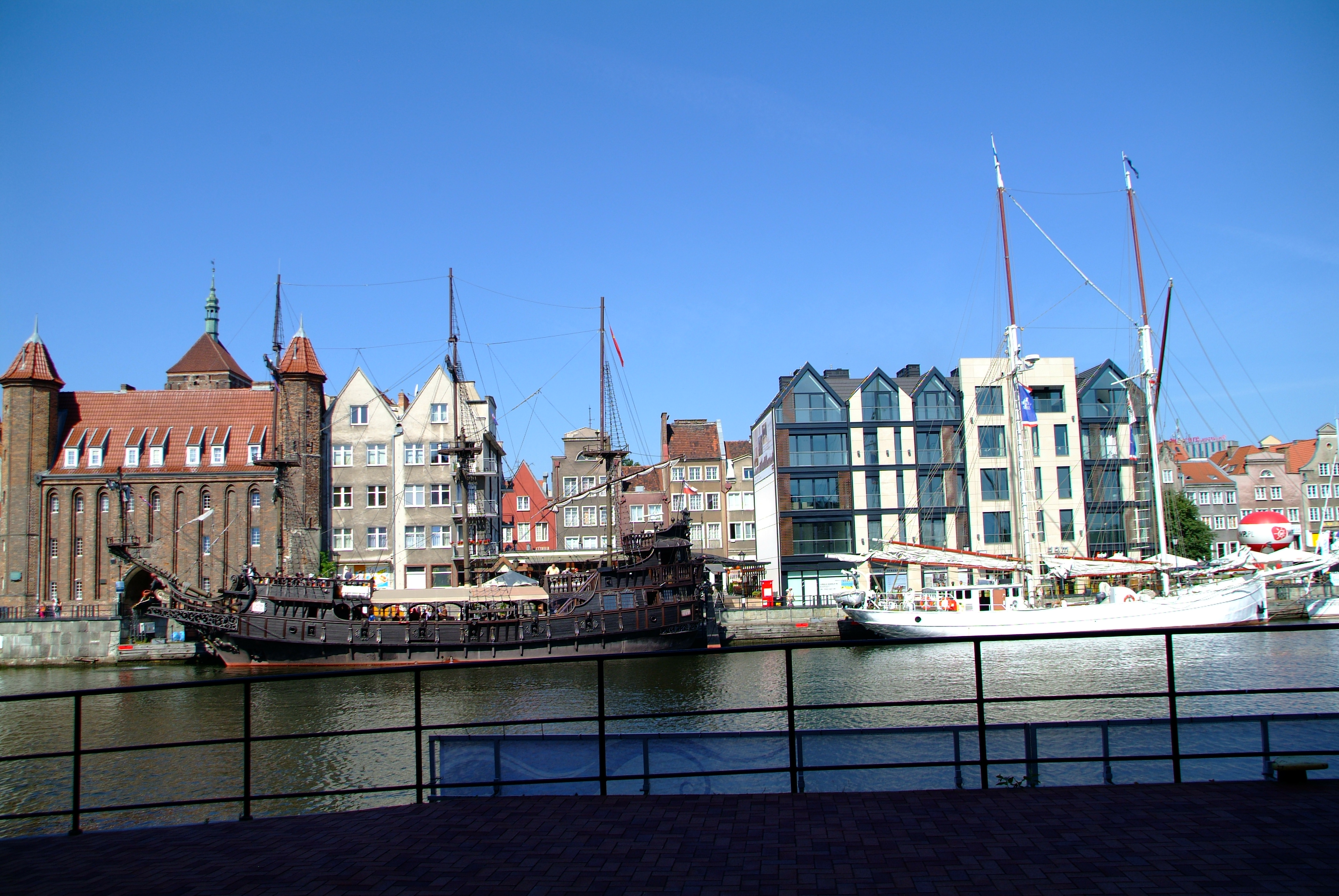
The Symfonia Residence in Gdańsk, Poland

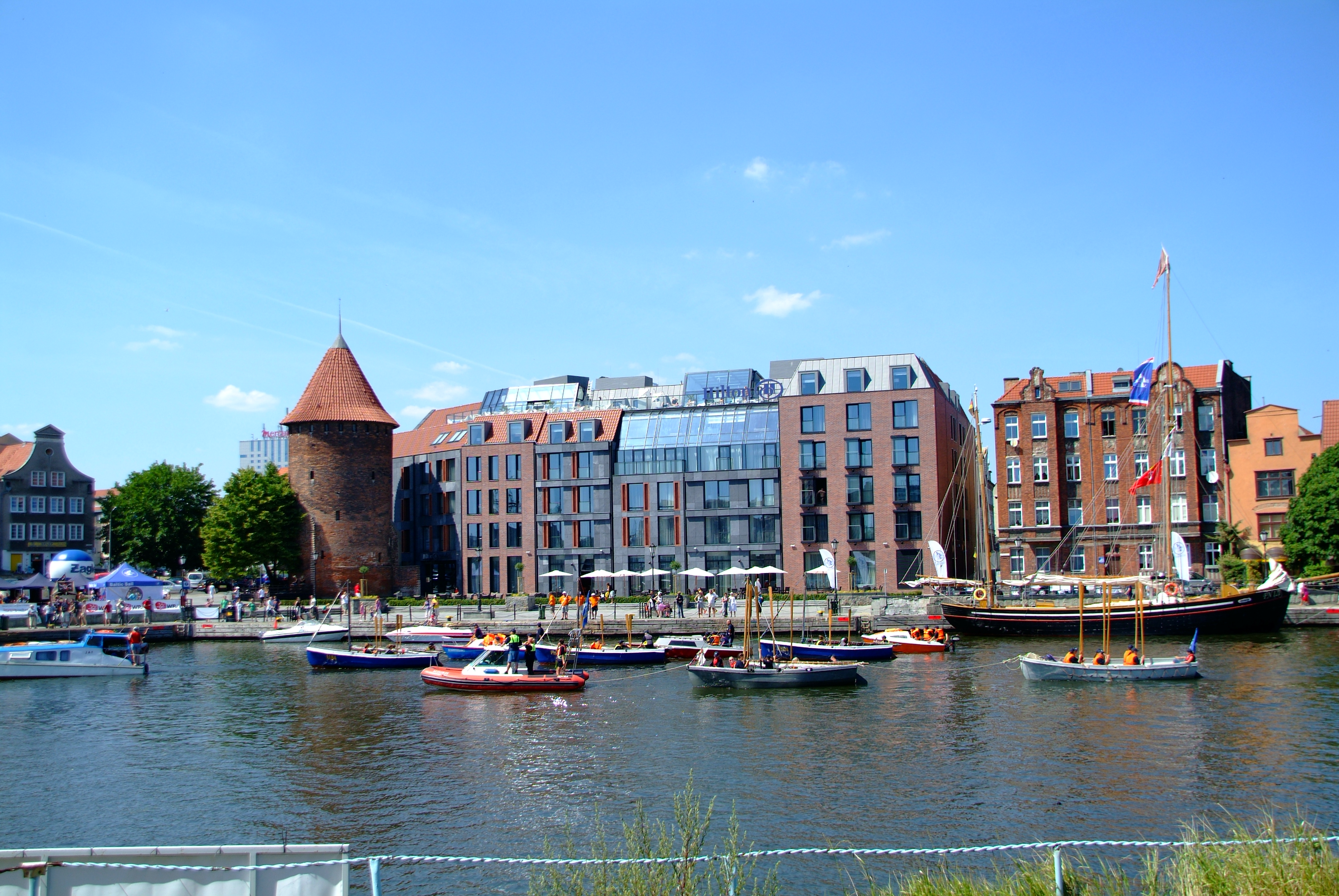
The Hilton Hotel in Gdańsk, Poland

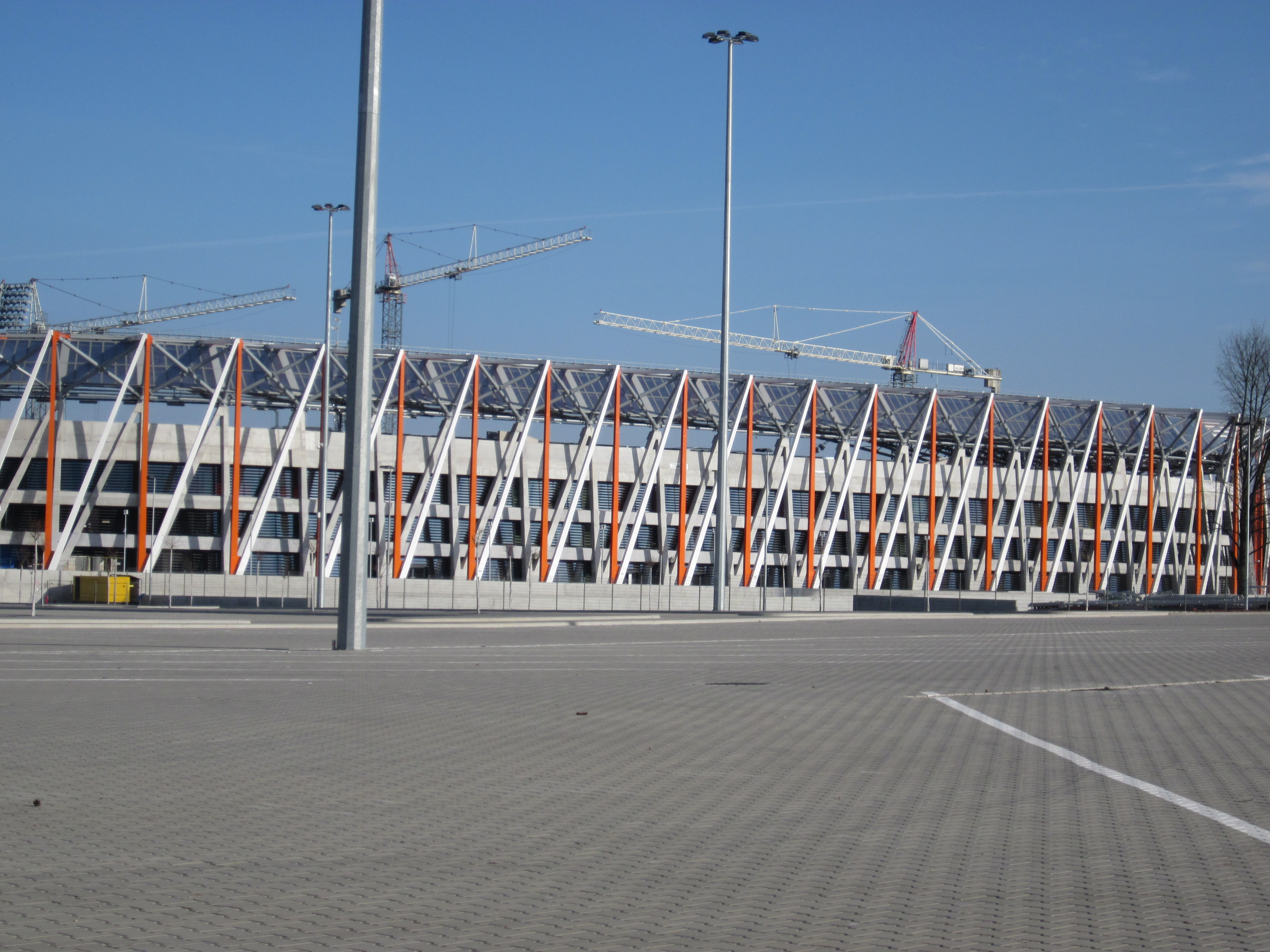
Białystok Municipal Stadium, Poland

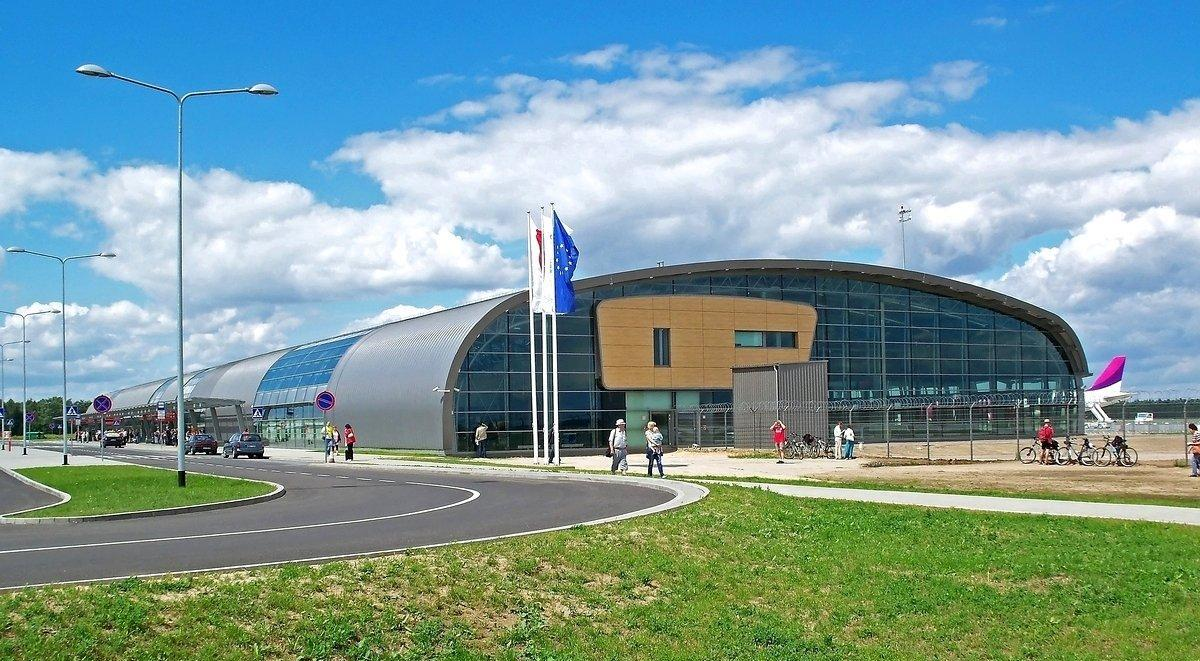
Modlin Airport, Warsaw

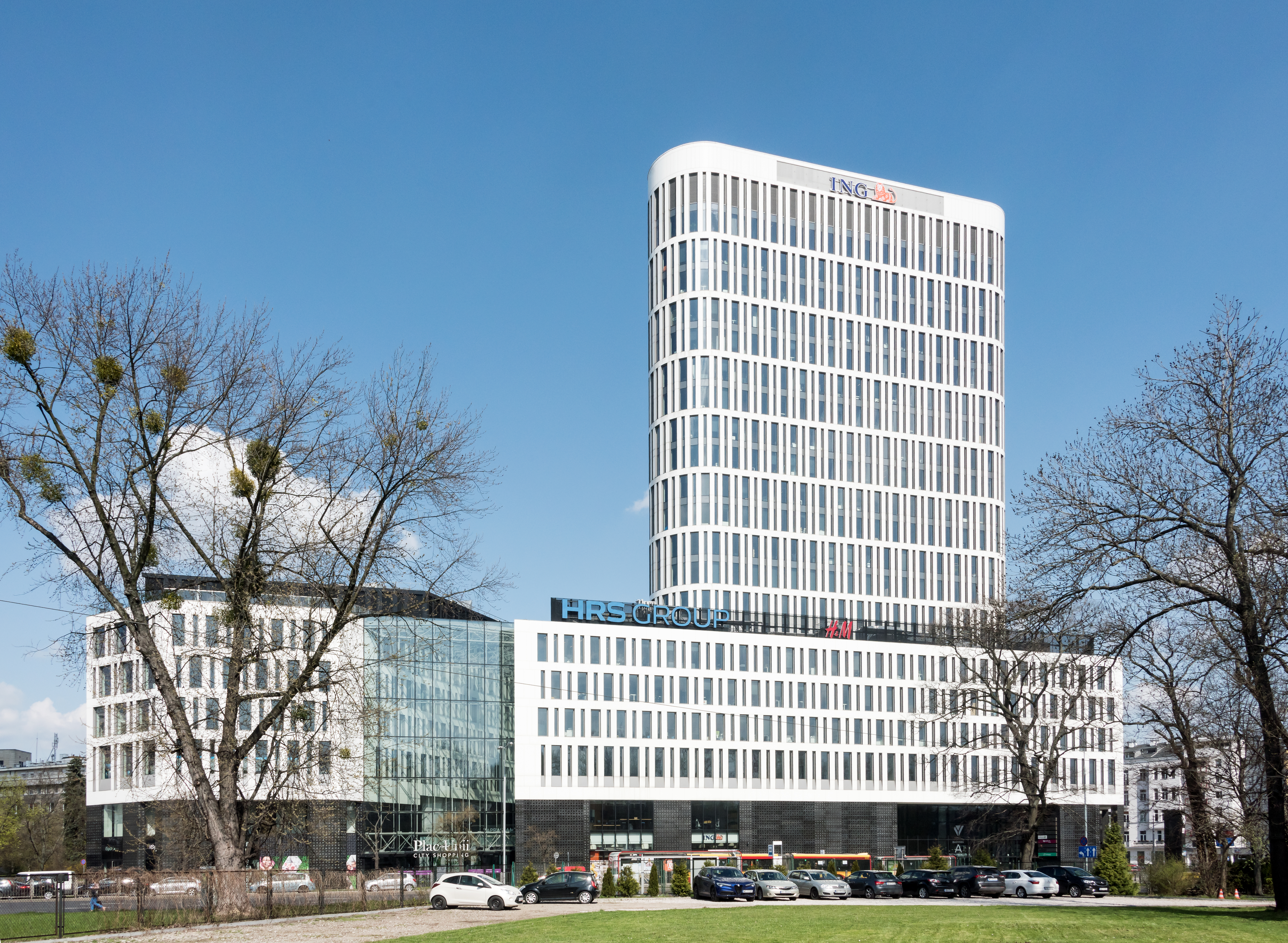
Plac Unii, Warsaw

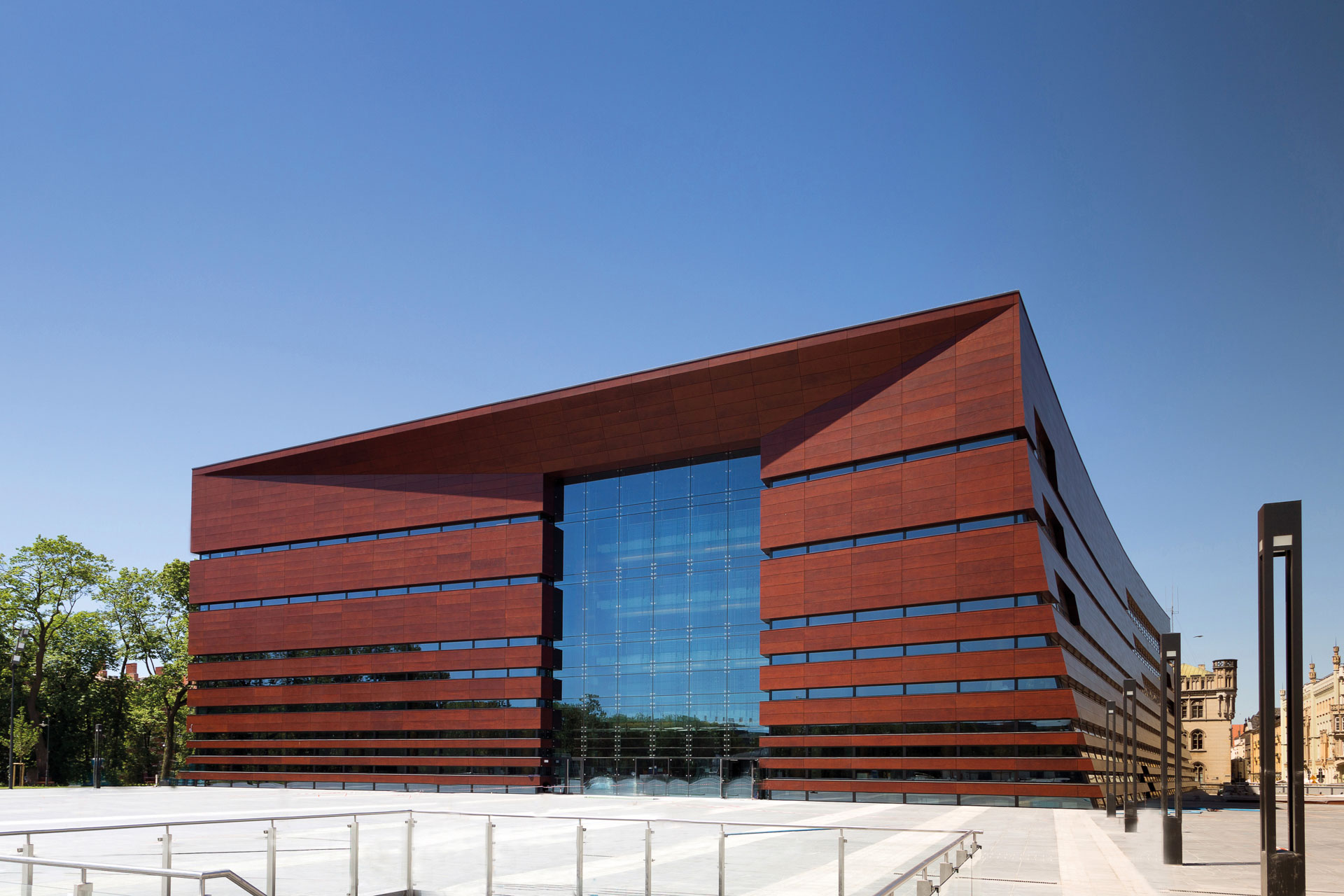
National Forum of Music, Wrocław
