= Sergiusz Prusak =

Polish footballer

Personal information
- Full name: Sergiusz Prusak
- Date of birth: 1 May 1979 (age 47)
- Place of birth: Pleszew, Poland
- Height: 1.93 m (6 ft 4 in)
- Position: Goalkeeper

Team information
- Current team: LKS Biskupice; Górnik Łęczna (goalkeeping coach)
- Number: 74

Youth career
- Czarni Dobrzyca
- Rolbud OSiR Pleszew
- Biały Orzeł Koźmin Wielkopolski
- Rolbud OSiR Pleszew

Senior career*
Years	Team	Apps	(Gls)
2000–2009	Flota Świnoujście		
2009–2019	Górnik Łęczna	272	(0)
2019	Lewart Lubartów	15	(0)
2020	Górnik Łęczna	0	(0)
2020–2021	Błękit Cyców	20	(1)
2022–	LKS Biskupice	47	(4)

Managerial career
- 2019–: Górnik Łęczna (goalkeeping coach)
- 2019–2022: Górnik Łęczna (women) (goalkeeping coach)
- * Club domestic league appearances and goals as of 11:23, 21 June 2025 (UTC)

Sergiusz Prusak (born 1 May 1979) is a Polish footballer who plays as a goalkeeper for LKS Biskupice. He also works as a goalkeeping coach for Górnik Łęczna.

On 26 February 2015, he was fined 2,000 PLN for giving his support to Zawisza fans who were in conflict with their chairman when Górnik played Zawisza, by wearing a t-shirt with a slogan "Zawisza is a fans' club" (Zawisza to klub kiboli)

As he was born in Pleszew, Greater Poland, he frequently reiterates that privately he is a fan of Lech Poznań, and even attends away games when he can.

== Honours ==
Flota Świnoujście

- III liga, group II: 2007–08

Górnik Łęczna

- II liga: 2019–20

Błękit Cyców

- Klasa A Lublin III: 2020–21
