= Stadion Miejski (Białystok) =

Football stadium in Białystok, Poland

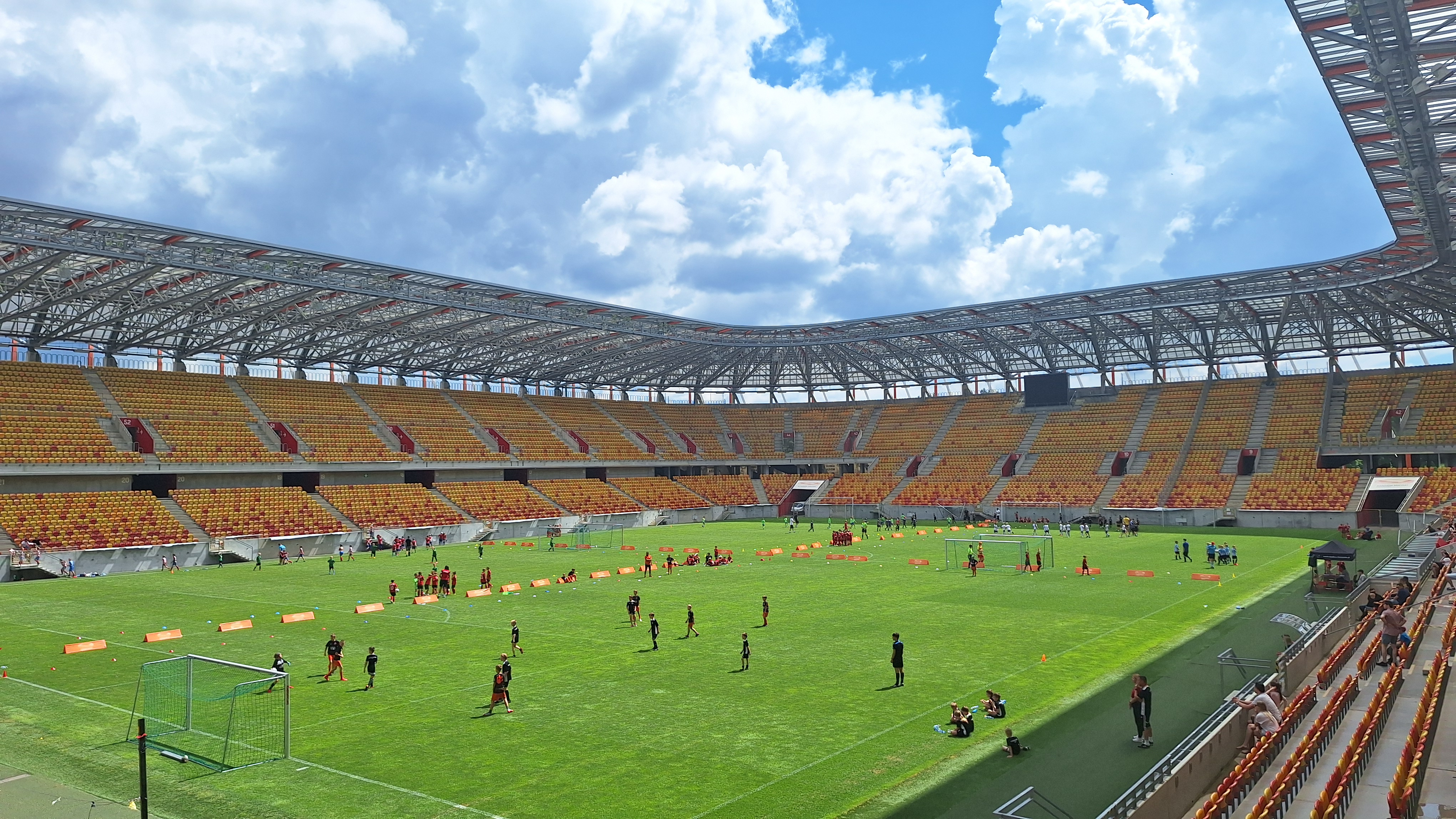
- The Białystok Stadium
- Interactive map of Stadion Miejski
- Full name: Stadion Miejski w Białymstoku
- Former names: Hetman Stadium
- Address: ul. Słoneczna 1
- Location: Białystok, Poland
- Coordinates: 53°6′22″N 23°8′58″E
- Owner: City of Białystok
- Capacity: 30,000 (1973); 22,432 (2018)
- Surface: Grass
- Record attendance: 36,000; Jagiellonia – Widzew; 1987; 22,394; Jagiellonia – Legia; 21 May 2017

Construction
- Built: 1971–1972
- Opened: July 22, 1972
- Renovated: 2008–2014
- Cost: 254 mn PLN (US$75,000,000)
- Architects: Stefan Kuryłowicz; Michał Adamczyk; Mikołaj Kwieciński; Krystyna Tulczyńska

Tenant
- Jagiellonia Białystok

Website
- stadion.bialystok.pl

The Stadion Miejski (English: Municipal Stadium) is located in Białystok, Poland. It is currently used mostly for association football matches and is the home ground of Jagiellonia Białystok. The stadium is also known as the Stadion Jagiellonii Białystok (English: Jagiellonia Białystok Stadium) in connection with its most common host.

The stadium recently underwent major redevelopment, completed at the end of 2014, it now contains 22,432 seats. Full cost of the redevelopment is not clear as the city had to terminate contract with one contractor, Polish-French Eiffage Mitex consortium. Both parties agreed on PLN 168 million (US$60 million) in 2010, but finances are not settled. In 2012 construction was taken over by new contractors, Spanish-Polish consortium of OHL and Hydrobudowa agreed to finish all remaining work at a cost of PLN 254 million (US$75 million).

From 19 September 2024, the stadium is called Chorten Arena for sponsorship reasons.

== History ==
The stadium was put into operation in 1971, it was named the guards stadium or Hetman Białystok stadium. Initially, the stadium contained 15,000 seats. After two years of modernizing the bleachers the capacity contained approximately 30,000 seats. In the late '80s when Jagiellonia, for the first time in history entered the first league, the stadium was filled with 20–30,000 people per game. In the '90s the stadium fell to disrepair as the team fell back to the second, third and fourth leagues. The situation changed at the beginning of the 21st century with the improvement of the sporting and financial condition of Jagiellonia. In 2005, with the money received from promotions the stadium was upgraded with 6,000 new chairs.

In 2006 the stadium was taken over by the city of Białystok and renamed to Stadion Miejski. This opened doors to further modernization of the stadium and it started with the allocation of 5 million złoty (US$1.3 million) for its expansion. The first completed investment was the heated pitch which was finished in March 2007. The cost of the new pitch was 3 mln 900 thousand złoty (US$1.05 million). The heated pitch now made it possible to stage matches regardless of the weather. In July 2007 there was a newly renovated locker room along with a new modern conference room.

== Modern stadium ==
The announcement of a new modern stadium first came up in late 2006. The design of the new stadium was drawn up by APA "Kuryłowicz & Associates" led by Stefan Kuryłowicz. The project was to place a new stadium in the place of the old one with 22,400 seats.

In 2008 began the demolition of the main grandstand and in its place would be the new VIP section and a place to meet the players. Soon after the rest of the grandstands were demolished. On May 25, 2010, the city of Białystok hired Polish-French Eiffage Mitex consortium construction company to build the new stadium with the cost of PLN 168 million (US$60 million).

The stadium was estimated to be completed in 2012. However, due to a delay in work the city ended the contract with the French-Polish Effiage Mitex consortium company. Spanish-Polish consortium construction company was hired to finish the job for a sum of PLN 254 million (US$75 million). In August 2013 the stadium already had 7 thousand new seats, meeting rooms, and a place for the media. Next was the completion of 15 thousand more seats, places for commercial use, and next to the stadium, a new training pitch. On October 9, 2014 the stadium was officially completed with over 20 thousand seats. The stadium is owned completely by the city of Białystok.

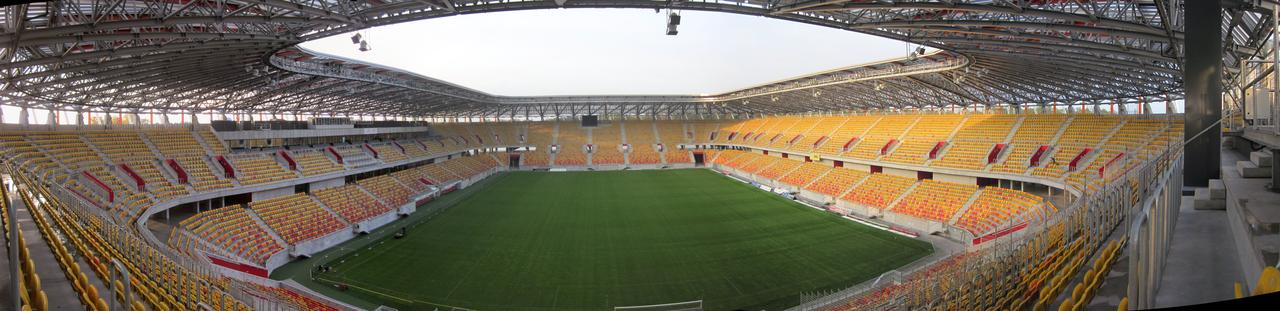
Panoramic view of the stadium interior

== Poland national team matches ==
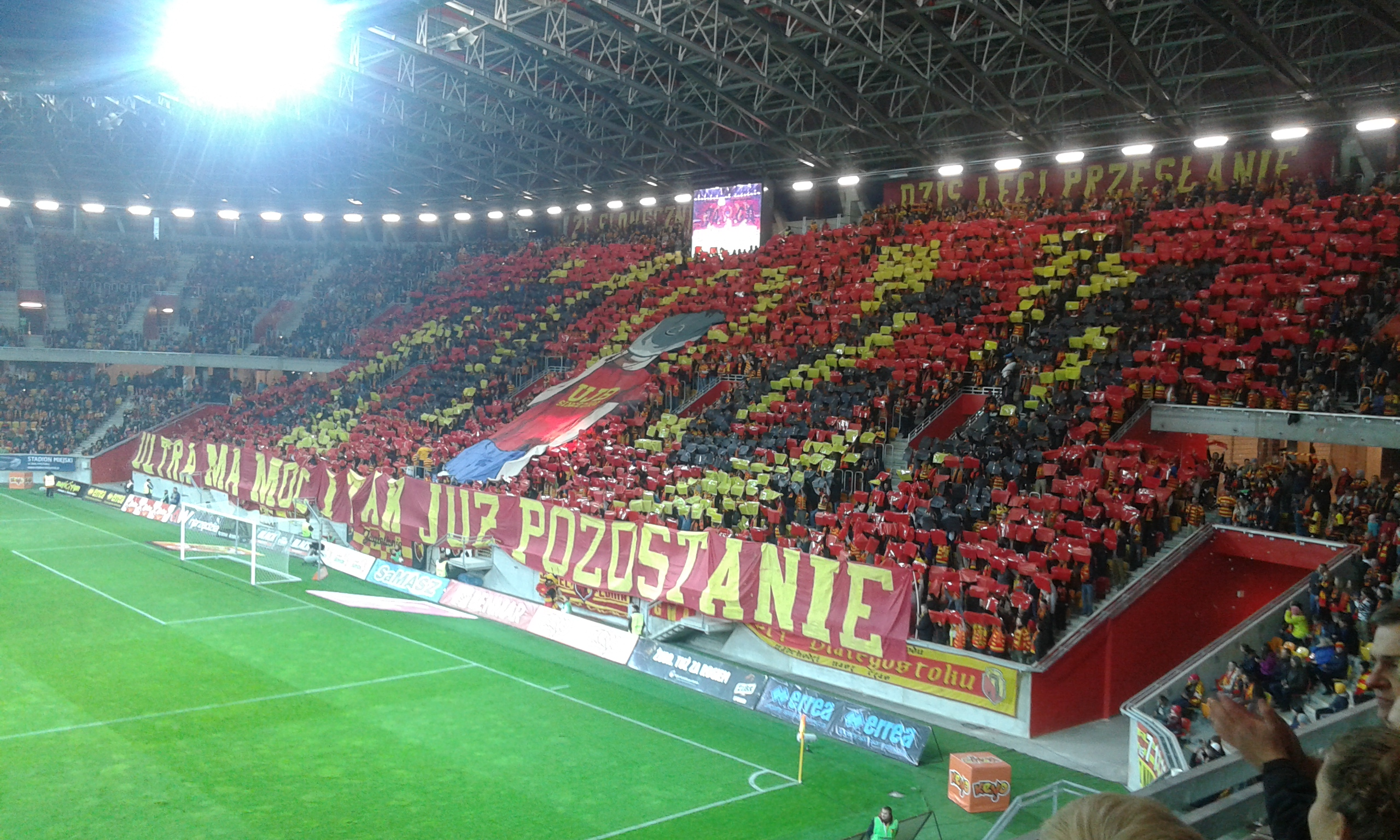
The stadium during a match

Nr	Competition	Date	Opponent	Attendance	Result	Scorers for Poland	Source
1	Friendly	24 August 1988	Bulgaria	11,000	3–2 (1–0)	Ivanov (o.g.), Furtok, Rudy	

== See also ==
- Jagiellonia Białystok
- List of football stadiums in Poland
