= Patryk Rachwał =

Polish footballer

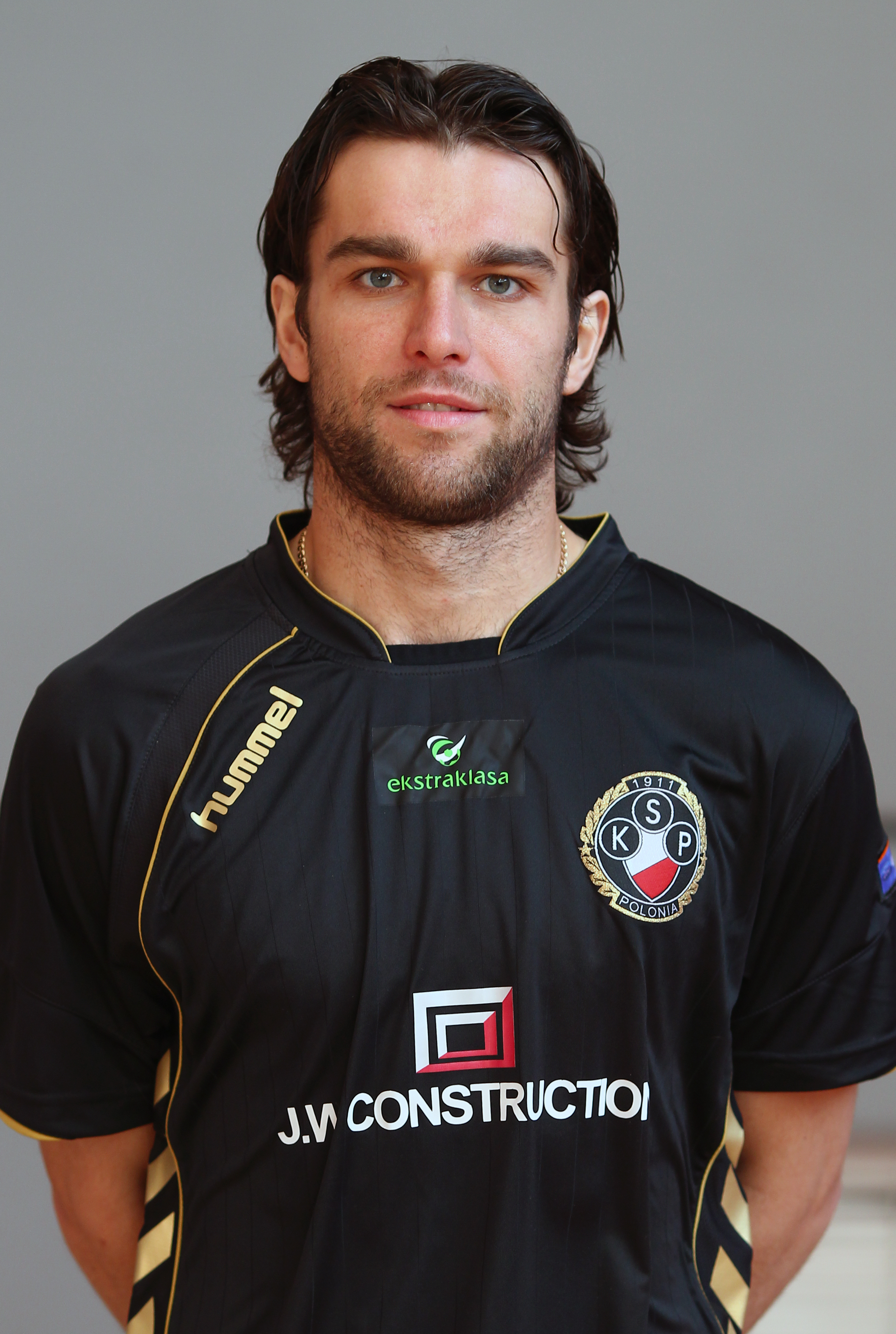
- Rachwał with Polonia Warsaw in 2011

Personal information
- Full name: Patryk Rachwał
- Date of birth: 27 January 1981 (age 45)
- Place of birth: Zabrze, Poland
- Height: 1.76 m (5 ft 9 in)
- Position: Midfielder

Team information
- Current team: Jagiellonia Białystok (academy deputy director)

Senior career*
| Years | Team | Apps | (Gls) |
| 1997–1999 | Górnik Zabrze | 2 | (0) |
| 1999–2000 | Energie Cottbus II | 0 | (0) |
| 2000–2001 | Sachsen Leipzig | 15 | (0) |
| 2001–2004 | Widzew Łódź | 65 | (2) |
| 2004–2007 | Wisła Płock | 73 | (2) |
| 2007–2010 | GKS Bełchatów | 83 | (2) |
| 2010–2011 | Polonia Warsaw | 12 | (0) |
| 2011–2013 | Zagłębie Lubin | 18 | (1) |
| 2013–2019 | GKS Bełchatów | 145 | (13) |
| Total | | 413 | (20) |

International career
| 2003–2005 | Poland | 4 | (0) |

Managerial career
- 2021: GKS Bełchatów
- 2022: KP Starogard Gdański
- 2024: GKS Bełchatów (interim)
- 2025: GKS Bełchatów
- * Club domestic league appearances and goals

Patryk Rachwał (born 27 January 1981) is a Polish professional football manager and former player. He is currently the deputy director of Jagiellonia Białystok's academy.

== Club career ==
In June 2007, he moved to GKS Bełchatów on a three-year contract. In June 2010, he joined Polonia Warsaw on a three-year contract. He was released from Polonia one year later. In July 2011, he signed a two-year contract with Zagłębie Lubin.

== International career ==
He was a part of the Poland national team, earning four caps from 2003 to 2005.

== Managerial career ==
On 25 June 2021, Rachwał was appointed as the new manager of GKS Bełchatów. He was dismissed on 15 November, with the team sitting in the relegation zone.

On 26 April 2022, he took charge of III liga club KP Starogard Gdański.

In 2023, he returned to GKS Bełchatów to join their academy as a coordinator for age groups from U14 to U19. On 29 April 2024, following Bogdan Jóźwiak's departure, Rachwał replaced him as GKS' senior team manager on an interim basis until the end of the season.

On 7 January 2025, he was appointed manager of GKS again, replacing the outgoing Artur Derbin. Rachwał resigned from his role on 9 June 2025, at the conclusion of the 2024–25 season.

On 4 August 2025, Rachwał took on the role of deputy director at Ekstraklasa club Jagiellonia Białystok's academy.

== Managerial statistics ==
As of match played 7 June 2025

Managerial record by team and tenure
| Team | From | To | Record | | | | | | | |
| Team | From | To | G | W | D | L | GF | GA | GD | Win % |
|---|---|---|---|---|---|---|---|---|---|---|
| GKS Bełchatów | 25 June 2021 | 15 November 2021 | 18 | 5 | 2 | 11 | 14 | 35 | −21 | 27.78 |
| KP Starogard Gdański | 25 April 2022 | 4 September 2022 | 15 | 4 | 6 | 5 | 16 | 18 | −2 | 26.67 |
| GKS Bełchatów (interim) | 29 April 2024 | 13 June 2024 | 7 | 3 | 1 | 3 | 11 | 14 | −3 | 42.86 |
| GKS Bełchatów | 7 January 2025 | 9 June 2025 | 16 | 5 | 5 | 6 | 24 | 30 | −6 | 31.25 |
| Total | | | 56 | 17 | 14 | 25 | 65 | 97 | −32 | 30.36 |

== Honours ==
Wisła Płock

- Polish Cup: 2005–06
- Polish Super Cup: 2006

GKS Bełchatów

- I liga: 2013–14
