= Bogdan Jóźwiak =

Polish association football player

Personal information
- Date of birth: 17 July 1970 (age 56)
- Place of birth: Raciąż, Poland
- Height: 1.72 m (5 ft 8 in)
- Position: Midfielder

Senior career*
Years	Team	Apps	(Gls)
–1987	Błękitni Raciąż		
1987–1991	Wisła Płock		
1991–1995	Widzew Łódź	107	(11)
1995–1996	Wisła Płock	37	(5)
1996–1997	Hapoel Tayibe	15	(0)
1997	Hapoel Kfar Saba	15	(4)
1997-1999	Wisła Płock	37	(0)
1999–2000	Pelikan Łowicz		
2000–2005	RKS Radomsko	189	(31)
2005–2008	Pelikan Łowicz	12	(0)

Managerial career
- 2007: Pelikan Łowicz (caretaker)
- 2008: Pelikan Łowicz
- 2009–2010: Warta Sieradz
- 2010–2011: Sokół Aleksandrów Łódzki
- 2012–2014: Warta Sieradz
- 2014–2016: Pelikan Łowicz
- 2017–2018: Lechia Tomaszów Mazowiecki
- 2019: Sokół Aleksandrów Łódzki
- 2019–2020: Legionovia Legionowo
- 2020–2022: Ursus Warsaw
- 2022–2024: GKS Bełchatów
- 2024–2025: Świt Nowy Dwór Mazowiecki
- * Club domestic league appearances and goals

Bogdan Jóźwiak (born 17 July 1970) is a Polish professional football manager and player who was most recently in charge of III liga club Świt Nowy Dwór Mazowiecki.

== Managerial statistics ==
As of match played 16 May 2025

Managerial record by team and tenure
Team	From	To	Record							
Team	From	To	G	W	D	L	GF	GA	GD	Win %
Pelikan Łowicz (caretaker)	1 October 2007	15 October 2007	3	1	1	1	5	5	+0	33.33
Pelikan Łowicz	6 October 2008	31 December 2008	6	2	1	3	6	10	−4	33.33
Warta Sieradz	16 April 2009	16 May 2010	40	16	11	13	57	45	+12	40.00
Sokół Aleksandrów Łódzki	20 May 2010	4 October 2011	54	24	11	19	79	54	+25	44.44
Warta Sieradz	10 September 2012	12 June 2014	66	27	16	23	91	85	+6	40.91
Pelikan Łowicz	12 June 2014	3 October 2016	86	43	20	23	145	79	+66	50.00
Lechia Tomaszów Mazowiecki	15 April 2017	19 December 2018	70	45	10	15	151	75	+76	64.29
Sokół Aleksandrów Łódzki	3 April 2019	30 June 2019	14	9	4	1	29	9	+20	64.29
Legionovia Legionowo	30 December 2019	25 July 2020	14	3	3	8	17	26	−9	21.43
Ursus Warsaw	4 November 2020	21 June 2022	59	27	13	19	95	96	−1	45.76
GKS Bełchatów	22 June 2022	26 April 2024	71	50	10	11	194	67	+127	70.42
Świt Nowy Dwór Mazowiecki	16 December 2024	Present	13	4	4	5	22	25	−3	30.77
Total			496	251	104	141	891	576	+315	50.60

== Honours ==
=== Managerial ===
GKS Bełchatów

- IV liga Łódź: 2022–23
