= Grzelak =

Grzelak is a Polish surname derived from the given name Grzela, colloquial for 'Grzegorz'. Archaic feminine forms (now used colloquially) are Grzelakówna (by father) and Grzelakowa (by husband). Notable people with the surname include:

- Bartłomiej Grzelak, Polish footballer
- Bartosz Grzelak, Polish-Swedish football player and manager
- Klaudia Grzelak, Polish volleyball player
- Mikołaj Grzelak, Polish footballer
- Rafał Grzelak, Polish footballer
- Rafał Grzelak (born 1988), Polish footballer
- Stanisław Grzelak, Polish cyclist
- Tadeusz Grzelak, Polish boxer

== Fictional characters ==
- Grzelakowa, character from Polish sitcom Miodowe lata
