= Serhiy Napolov =

Ukrainian footballer

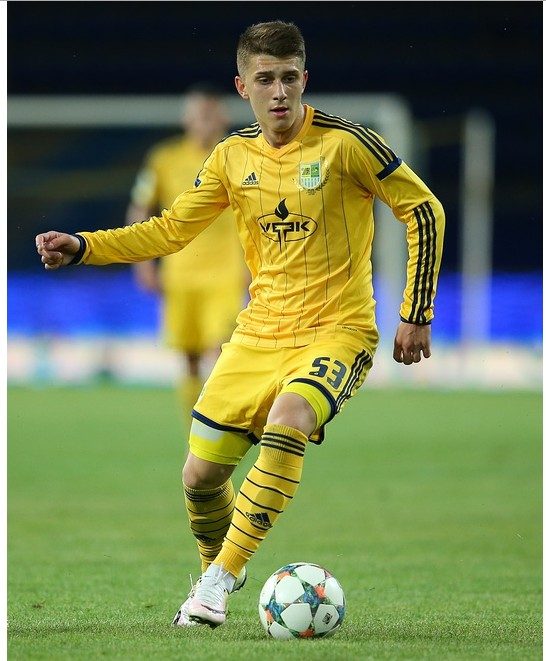
- Napolov in 2016

Personal information
- Full name: Serhiy Mykolayovych Napolov
- Date of birth: 27 January 1996 (age 30)
- Place of birth: Chernihiv, Ukraine
- Height: 1.78 m (5 ft 10 in)
- Position: Left winger

Youth career
- 2009–2013: RVUFK Kyiv
- 2013: Metalurh Donetsk

Senior career*
| Years | Team | Apps | (Gls) |
| 2013–2015 | Metalurh Donetsk | 0 | (0) |
| 2015–2016 | Metalist Kharkiv | 4 | (1) |
| 2016 | Metalist 1925 Kharkiv (amateurs) | 10 | (3) |
| 2017–2019 | Chrobry Głogów | 49 | (1) |
| 2019–2020 | Warta Poznań | 22 | (0) |
| 2020–2021 | Chojniczanka Chojnice | 33 | (2) |
| 2021–2022 | VPK-Ahro Shevchenkivka | 17 | (0) |
| 2022 | LNZ Cherkasy | 0 | (0) |
| 2022 | KP Starogard Gdański | 25 | (6) |
| 2023–2026 | GKS Bełchatów | 107 | (20) |

International career
| 2012 | Ukraine U16 | 2 | (0) |
| 2014 | Ukraine U18 | 1 | (0) |
- * Club domestic league appearances and goals as of 22:22, 3 June 2026 (UTC)

Serhiy Mykolayovych Napolov (Ukrainian: Сергій Миколайович Наполов; born 27 January 1996) is a Ukrainian professional footballer who plays as a left midfielder.

== Career ==
Napolov is a product of the RVUFK Kyiv Sportive School system.

He spent his career in the Ukrainian Premier League Reserves club FC Metalurh Donetsk. In July 2015 Napolov signed a contract with FC Metalist and was promoted to the Ukrainian Premier League's squad. He made his debut for Metalist Kharkiv in the Ukrainian Premier League in a match against FC Stal Dniprodzerzhynsk on 24 April 2016. In January 2017 he signed a contract with Chrobry Glogow.

On 4 August 2020, he joined Chojniczanka Chojnice in the Polish third-tier II liga.

== Honours ==
GKS Bełchatów

- IV liga Łódź: 2022–23
