= Łukasz Wroński =

Polish footballer (born 1994)

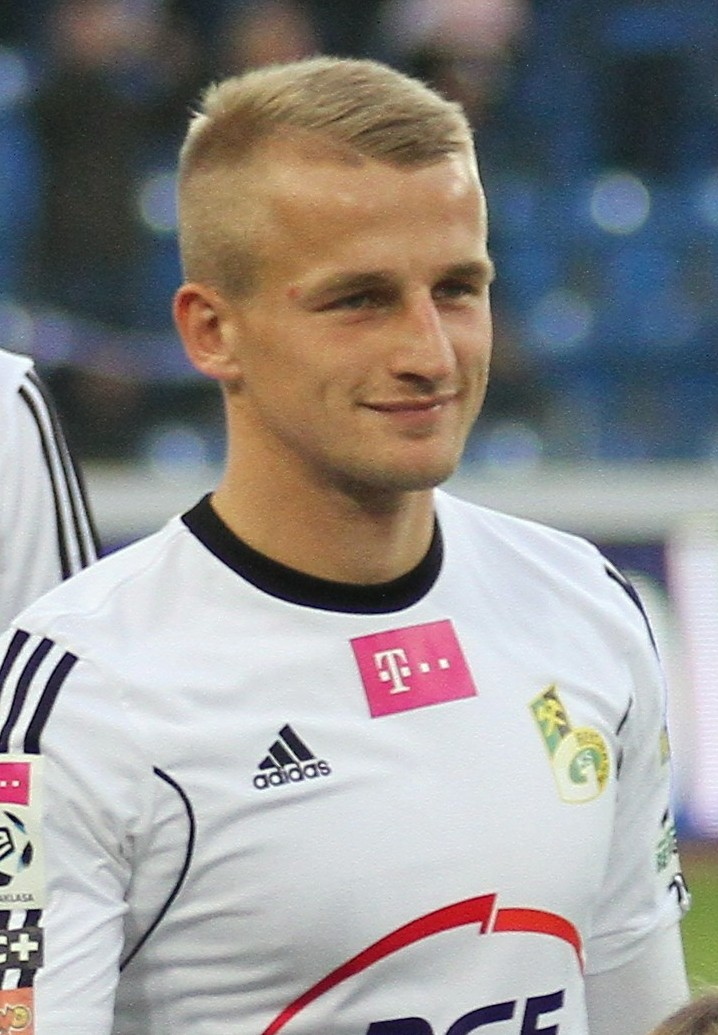
- Wroński with GKS Bełchatów in 2014

Personal information
- Full name: Łukasz Wroński
- Date of birth: 13 January 1994 (age 32)
- Place of birth: Bełchatów, Poland
- Height: 1.75 m (5 ft 9 in)
- Position: Attacking midfielder

Team information
- Current team: GKS Bełchatów (U17 manager)

Youth career
- 2009–2011: GKS Bełchatów

Senior career*
Years	Team	Apps	(Gls)
2011–2016	GKS Bełchatów	84	(4)
2016–2017	Wigry Suwałki	25	(2)
2017–2019	Stal Mielec	48	(6)
2019–2020	GKS Katowice	19	(1)
2020–2022	GKS Bełchatów	33	(1)
2022	Puszcza Niepołomice	9	(1)
2022–2026	GKS Bełchatów	127	(50)
Total		345	(65)

International career
2009–2010	Poland U16	13	(2)
2010–2011	Poland U17	10	(3)
2011–2012	Poland U18	8	(0)
2012	Poland U19	4	(0)
2014–2015	Poland U20	6	(1)

Managerial career
- 2025–: GKS Bełchatów (U17)
- * Club domestic league appearances and goals

Łukasz Wroński (born 13 January 1994) is a Polish former professional footballer who played as an attacking midfielder. He currently works as a youth coach for his former club GKS Bełchatów.

== Club career ==
On 10 August 2020, he returned to GKS Bełchatów on a one-year contract.

On 1 March 2022, Wroński moved to Puszcza Niepołomice on a deal until the end of June 2022, with a one-year extension option.

On 3 August 2022, he rejoined GKS Bełchatów yet again, signing a one-year deal with an extension option.

On 30 June 2026, Wroński announced his retirement from professional football.

== Coaching career ==
In 2023, Wroński began working at GKS Bełchatów's academy as a coach. He acquired the UEFA B license in December 2023. At the start of the 2025–26 season, he took charge of GKS' under-17 team.

== Honours ==
GKS Bełchatów

- I liga: 2013–14
- IV liga Łódź: 2022–23
