= Krzysztof Kazimierczak =

Polish footballer

Personal information
- Full name: Krzysztof Kazimierczak
- Date of birth: 13 March 1981 (age 45)
- Place of birth: Lubin, Poland
- Height: 1.80 m (5 ft 11 in)
- Position: Defender

Senior career*
Years	Team	Apps	(Gls)
2000–2003	Zagłębie Lubin	41	(1)
2001	→ Miedź Legnica (loan)		
2004–2006	Wisła Płock	53	(1)
2007	Boavista Porto	1	(0)
2008	Polonia Warsaw	10	(0)
2008–2011	Górnik Łęczna	50	(1)
2009–2011	Górnik Łęczna II	16	(2)
2011–2012	KS Polkowice	16	(0)
2014	Prochowiczanka Prochowice	8	(0)

International career
2003	Poland U21	3	(0)
- * Club domestic league appearances and goals

Krzysztof Kazimierczak (born 13 March 1981) is a Polish former professional footballer who played as a defender.

He was part of the Wisła Płock team that won the Polish Cup in 2006.

== Career ==
In July 2011, Kazimierczak joined KS Polkowice.

== Honours ==
Wisła Płock

- Polish Cup: 2005–06
