= Robert Gubiec =

Polish footballer

Personal information
- Full name: Robert Gubiec
- Date of birth: 19 February 1979 (age 47)
- Place of birth: Warsaw, Poland
- Height: 1.90 m (6 ft 3 in)
- Position: Goalkeeper

Youth career
- Legia Warsaw
- –1998: Agrykola Warsaw

Senior career*
Years	Team	Apps	(Gls)
1998–2003	Polonia Warsaw	19	(0)
2004	Stasiak Opoczno	4	(0)
2004–2008	Wisła Płock	50	(0)
2007–2008	→ Rodos (loan)		
- * Club domestic league appearances and goals

Robert Gubiec (born 19 February 1979) is a Polish former professional footballer who played as a goalkeeper

== Playing career ==
Born in Warsaw, Gubiec began playing professional football for local side Polonia Warsaw. He would spend five seasons as a reserve goalkeeper, making just 19 Ekstraklasa appearances for the club. A brief spell at lower-division side Stasiak Opoczno followed, before he moved to Wisła Płock. Gubiec made 50 league appearances for Wisła.

At age 28, he went abroad for a loan spell with Greek third division side Rodos in September 2007.

== Honours ==
Wisła Płock

- Polish Cup: 2005–06
- Polish Super Cup: 2006
