= Bartłomiej Bartosiak =

Polish footballer (born 1991)

Personal information
- Full name: Bartłomiej Bartosiak
- Date of birth: 26 February 1991 (age 35)
- Place of birth: Bełchatów, Poland
- Height: 1.78 m (5 ft 10 in)
- Position: Midfielder

Team information
- Current team: GKS Bełchatów
- Number: 7

Youth career
- –2010: GKS Bełchatów

Senior career*
Years	Team	Apps	(Gls)
2010–2020	GKS Bełchatów	163	(24)
2011–2012	→ Olimpia Elbląg (loan)	20	(1)
2016	→ Stal Stalowa Wola (loan)	13	(2)
2020–2022	Wisła Puławy	60	(18)
2022–2025	GKS Bełchatów	89	(36)
2025–2026	Polonia Piotrków Trybunalski	30	(9)
2026–	GKS Bełchatów	1	(0)
- * Club domestic league appearances and goals as of 20:38, 13 September 2026 (UTC)

Bartłomiej Bartosiak (born 26 February 1991) is a Polish professional footballer who plays as a midfielder for IV liga Łódź club GKS Bełchatów.

== Career ==
In August 2011, Bartosiak was loaned to Olimpia Elbląg on a half-year deal.

On 1 July 2020, he signed with fourth-tier club Wisła Puławy.

On 25 July 2022, he returned to GKS Bełchatów following the club's demotion from II liga to IV liga.

On 30 July 2025, Bartosiak moved to IV liga Łódź side Polonia Piotrków Trybunalski. He re-joined GKS Bełchatów a year later, on 11 September.

== Honours ==
GKS Bełchatów

- I liga: 2013–14
- IV liga Łódź: 2022–23

Wisła Puławy

- III liga, group IV: 2020–21
- Polish Cup (Lublin County regionals): 2020–21
