= Paweł Kaczmarek (footballer) =

Polish footballer

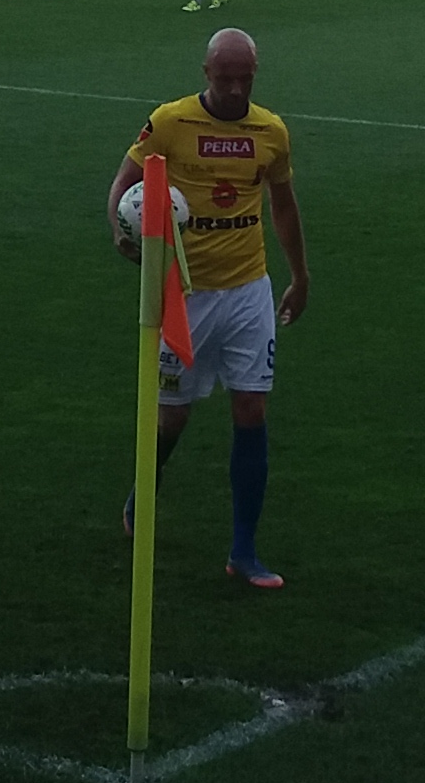
- Kaczmarek with Motor Lublin in 2017

Personal information
- Full name: Paweł Kaczmarek
- Date of birth: 1 July 1985 (age 41)
- Place of birth: Złotów, Poland
- Height: 1.79 m (5 ft 10 in)
- Position: Midfielder

Youth career
- Drawa Drawsko Pomorskie
- MSP Szamotuły
- Amica Wronki

Senior career*
Years	Team	Apps	(Gls)
2004–2005	Kaszubia Kościerzyna		
2005–2006	Arka Gdynia	0	(0)
2006	→ Tur Turek (loan)		
2006	Radomiak Radom		
2007	Wigry Suwałki		
2007–2009	Znicz Pruszków	67	(11)
2009–2013	Korona Kielce	22	(2)
2011	→ Górnik Łęczna (loan)	12	(1)
2012	→ ŁKS Łódź (loan)	15	(3)
2013	Stomil Olsztyn	17	(4)
2013–2014	Wisła Płock	32	(1)
2015–2016	Znicz Pruszków	28	(3)
2016–2018	Motor Lublin	62	(9)
2018–2019	Sokół Aleksandrów Łódzki	31	(5)
2019–2020	Stal Kraśnik	18	(0)
2020–2021	KSZO Ostrowiec	30	(1)
2021–2022	Stal Poniatowa	32	(24)
- * Club domestic league appearances and goals

Paweł Kaczmarek (born 1 July 1985) is a Polish former professional footballer who played as a midfielder.

== Career ==
In February 2011, he was loaned to Górnik Łęczna.
