= Paweł Kaczmarek =

Paweł Kaczmarek may refer to:

- Paweł Kaczmarek (footballer) (born 1985), Polish footballer
- Paweł Kaczmarek (canoeist) (born 1995), Polish sprint kayaker
