= Piotr Szarpak =

Polish footballer

Personal information
- Date of birth: 21 March 1971 (age 55)
- Place of birth: Łódź, Poland
- Height: 1.76 m (5 ft 9 in)
- Position: Midfielder

Senior career*
Years	Team	Apps	(Gls)
1989–1998	ChKS Łódź		
1989–1998	Widzew Łódź	157	(12)
1992–1993	→ Hutnik Kraków (loan)	27	(2)
1999–2004	GKS Bełchatów		
2005	Sokół Aleksandrów Łódzki		

Managerial career
- 2009–2010: Włókniarz Zelów
- 2011–2012: Tur Turek
- 2014: Widzew Łódź (assistant)
- 2014–2015: Ner Poddębice
- 2021–2022: Boruta Zgierz
- * Club domestic league appearances and goals

Piotr Szarpak (born 21 March 1971) is a Polish football manager and former player who played as a midfielder.

== Honours ==
Widzew Łódź

- Ekstraklasa: 1995–96, 1996–97
