= Rafał Grzyb =

Polish footballer (born 1983)

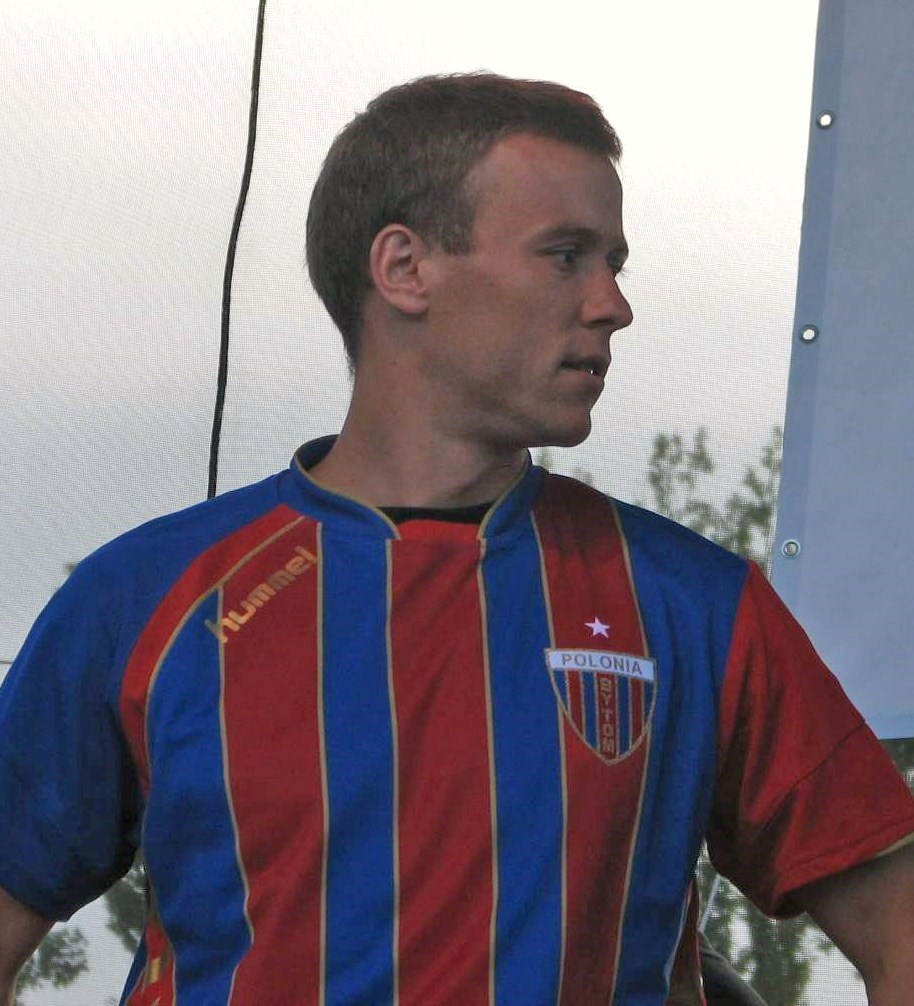
- Grzyb with Polonia Bytom in 2009

Personal information
- Full name: Rafał Sebastian Grzyb
- Date of birth: 16 January 1983 (age 43)
- Place of birth: Jędrzejów, Poland
- Height: 1.75 m (5 ft 9 in)
- Position: Midfielder

Team information
- Current team: Radomiak Radom (assistant)

Youth career
- Wierna Małogoszcz

Senior career*
Years	Team	Apps	(Gls)
2001–2007	Wierna Małogoszcz		
2006	→ Górnik Łęczna (loan)	0	(0)
2006–2007	→ Polonia Bytom (loan)	33	(1)
2007–2010	Polonia Bytom	87	(4)
2010–2018	Jagiellonia Białystok	262	(6)

Managerial career
- 2019: Jagiellonia Białystok (caretaker)
- 2021: Jagiellonia Białystok (caretaker)
- 2023: Jagiellonia Białystok II (caretaker)
- 2026: Radomiak Radom
- * Club domestic league appearances and goals

Rafał Sebastian Grzyb (born 16 January 1983) is a Polish professional football manager and former player who is currently the assistant manager of Ekstraklasa club Radomiak Radom. He also served as the councilor of the city of Białystok from the Civic Coalition committee from 2018 to 2024.

== Club career ==
Grzyb is a home-grown of Wierna Małogoszcz. In January 2011, he moved from Polonia Bytom to Jagiellonia Białystok on two-and-a-half-year contract. In the latter team, he finished his career after the 2018–19 Ekstraklasa autumn round.

== Coaching career ==
On 8 December 2019, Grzyb, who was the assistant manager of Jagiellonia Białystok at the time, was appointed as the club's interim manager after Ireneusz Mamrot's dismissal.

On 17 March 2021, he was again appointed on a temporary basis after Bogdan Zając's departure from Jagiellonia. Despite his initial temporary presence, he held the position for several months. On 4 June, he was replaced by the returning Mamrot. He left Jagiellonia's staff on 18 October 2025.

On 8 July 2026, Grzyb joined Ekstraklasa club Radomiak Radom as their new assistant manager, under recently appointed Tomasz Kaczmarek. On 8 September 2026, following Kaczmarek's move to Raków Częstochowa, Grzyb was appointed manager of Radomiak. After leading Radomiak in two league games, both ending in defeat, he was replaced by John Carver and moved back to his assistant role on 29 September.

== Politics ==
In the 2018 Polish local elections, he ran for the councilor of the city of Białystok from the Civic Coalition committee. He received 755 votes and, according to the calculations of the National Electoral Commission, it was not enough to get a seat. However, thanks to resignation from the mandate of councilor Tadeusz Truskolaski, Grzyb took his place in the newly appointed city council. He sought reelection in 2024, but was unsuccessful.

== Managerial statistics ==
As of match played 20 September 2026

Managerial record by team and tenure
Team	From	To	Record							
Team	From	To	G	W	D	L	GF	GA	GD	Win %
Jagiellonia Białystok (caretaker)	8 December 2019	30 December 2019	2	1	0	1	3	3	+0	50.00
Jagiellonia Białystok (caretaker)	17 March 2021	4 June 2021	9	3	3	3	13	15	−2	33.33
Jagiellonia Białystok II (caretaker)	20 October 2023	23 October 2023	1	0	1	0	1	1	+0	0.00
Radomiak Radom	8 September 2026	29 September 2026	2	0	0	2	1	7	−6	0.00
Total			14	4	4	6	18	26	−8	28.57

== Honours ==
=== Player ===
Jagiellonia Białystok

- Polish Cup: 2009–10
- Polish Super Cup: 2010
