= Paweł Magdoń =

Polish footballer

Personal information
- Full name: Paweł Magdoń
- Date of birth: 13 November 1979 (age 46)
- Place of birth: Dębica, Poland
- Height: 1.97 m (6 ft 5 1/2 in)
- Position: Defender

Team information
- Current team: Relax Czerniewice; Football Campus Tomaszów Maz. (chairman)
- Number: 25

Youth career
- Igloopol Dębica

Senior career*
Years	Team	Apps	(Gls)
1998–2003	Piotrcovia Piotrków	26	(3)
2000	ŁKS Łódź	6	(0)
2003–2005	Pogoń Szczecin	40	(1)
2006	Wisła Płock	24	(4)
2007–2010	GKS Bełchatów	24	(0)
2010	Odra Wodzisław	4	(0)
2010–2012	Górnik Łęczna	45	(0)
2012–2015	Wisła Płock	76	(3)
2015–2018	Lechia Tomaszów Mazowiecki	44	(4)
2026–	Relax Czerniewice	2	(2)

International career
2006	Poland	1	(1)
- * Club domestic league appearances and goals as of 09:12, 27 July 2026 (UTC)

Paweł Magdoń (born 13 November 1979) is a Polish football executive and player who plays as a defender for Klasa A club Relax Czerniewice. He also serves as the chairman of Football Campus Tomaszów Mazowiecki. From 2020 to 2023, he was the sporting director of Wisła Płock.

== Club career ==
Magdoń previously played for Górnik Łęczna.

== International career ==
He made his debut for the Poland national team against United Arab Emirates in Abu Dhabi on 6 December 2006, scoring one of the goals in a 5–2 win.

== Career statistics ==
=== International ===
Scores and results list Poland's goal tally first, score column indicates score after each Magdoń goal.

List of international goals scored by Paweł Magdoń
No.	Date	Venue	Opponent	Score	Result	Competition
1	6 December 2006	Al Nahyan Stadium, Abu Dhabi, United Arab Emirates	United Arab Emirates	4–2	5–2	Friendly

== Honours ==
Pogoń Szczecin

- II liga: 2003–04

Wisła Płock

- Polish Cup: 2005–06
- Polish Super Cup: 2006
- II liga East: 2012–13

Lechia Tomaszów Mazowiecki

- Polish Cup (Łódź regionals): 2015–16
