= Wiesław Wojno =

Polish football manager

Personal information
- Date of birth: 28 August 1955 (age 71)
- Place of birth: Piechowice, Poland

Managerial career
- Years: Team
- 1993–1994: Miedź Legnica
- 1994–1995: Zagłębie Lubin
- 1995–1996: Wisła Płock
- 1996–1997: Śląsk Wrocław
- 1997–2001: Chrobry Głogów
- 2001–2002: Wisła Płock
- 2002–2003: Zagłębie Lubin
- 2004–2005: Górnik Polkowice
- 2005–2006: ŁKS Łódź
- 2006–2007: Zagłębie Lubin (ME)
- 2007–2008: Zagłębie Lubin (assistant)
- 2008–2009: KSZO Ostrowiec Świętokrzyski
- 2009: MKS Oława
- 2009–2010: Tur Turek

Wiesław Wojno (born 28 August 1955) is a Polish former professional football manager.

== Honours ==
KSZO Ostrowiec Świętokrzyski

- II liga East: 2008–09
