= Włodzimierz Tylak =

Polish football manager

Personal information
- Date of birth: 17 May 1950 (age 76)
- Place of birth: Łódź, Poland

Senior career*
Years	Team	Apps	(Gls)
- ŁKS Łódź

Managerial career
- 1990–1991: Igloopol Dębica
- 1992–1993: GKS Bełchatów
- 1999–2001: Włókniarz Konstantynów
- 2001–2002: Piotrcovia Piotrków (assistant)
- 2002: Piotrcovia Piotrków
- 2003: ŁKS Łódź (assistant)
- 2003: ŁKS Łódź
- 2003–2005: Tur Turek
- 2005–2006: Start Łódź
- 2007–2008: Zryw Dąbie
- 2008: Tur Turek
- 2009: Wisła Płock
- 2009–2011: Zryw Dąbie
- 2014: Widzew Łódź
- * Club domestic league appearances and goals

Włodzimierz Tylak (born 17 May 1950) is a Polish football manager and former player.
