= Mikołaj Grzelak =

Polish footballer (born 1991)

Personal information
- Full name: Mikołaj Grzelak
- Date of birth: 20 June 1991 (age 35)
- Place of birth: Bełchatów, Poland
- Height: 1.80 m (5 ft 11 in)
- Position: Defender

Team information
- Current team: GKS Bełchatów (caretaker manager)

Youth career
- 2009–2012: GKS Bełchatów

Senior career*
Years	Team	Apps	(Gls)
2012–2014	GKS Bełchatów	2	(0)
2013–2014	GKS Bełchatów II	28	(0)
2014–2015	Omega Kleszczów	11	(0)
2015	Rozwój Katowice	1	(0)
2015–2017	Legionovia Legionowo	82	(3)
2018–2022	GKS Bełchatów	79	(0)
2022–2025	GKS Bełchatów	64	(5)
Total		267	(8)

Managerial career
- 2026–: GKS Bełchatów (caretaker)
- * Club domestic league appearances and goals

Mikołaj Grzelak (born 20 June 1991) is a Polish former professional footballer who played as a defender. He is currently the caretaker manager of IV liga Łódź club GKS Bełchatów.

== Playing career ==
Grzelak made his Ekstraklasa debut in a 0–2 away loss against Górnik Zabrze on 2 November 2012, playing nine minutes.

He suffered a serious injury in a I liga match against Bruk-Bet Termalica Nieciecza on 12 July 2020.

Grzelak returned to playing after 236 days of absence in a league fixture against Miedź Legnica on 5 March 2021.

On 7 September 2022, he rejoined GKS Bełchatów, now in fifth division, on a deal until the end of the season.

== Coaching career ==
After retiring at the end of the 2024–25 season, Grzelak joined GKS Bełchatów's coaching staff as an assistant.

On 7 September 2026, he was named the caretaker head coach following Robert Rogan's resignation.

== Managerial statistics ==
As of match played 12 September 2026

Managerial record by team and tenure
Team	From	To	Record							
Team	From	To	G	W	D	L	GF	GA	GD	Win %
GKS Tychy (caretaker)	7 September 2026	Present	2	1	0	1	5	8	−3	50.00
Total			2	1	0	1	5	8	−3	50.00

== Honours ==
GKS Bełchatów

- IV liga Łódź: 2022–23
