= GKS Bełchatów =

Association football club in Poland

- Full name: Fundacja Akademia GKS Bełchatów
- Nicknames: Gieksa; Brunatni (The Browns); Torfiarze (The Turfers)
- Founded: 26 November 1977; 48 years ago
- Ground: GIEKSA Arena
- Capacity: 5,264
- Chairman: Krystian Kierach
- Manager: Mikołaj Grzelak (caretaker)
- League: IV liga Łódź
- 2025–26: III liga, group I, 16th of 18 (relegated)
- Website: gksbelchatow.com.pl
Home colours	Away colours

GKS Bełchatów [ɡʲɛkaˈɛs bɛwˈxatuf] is a Polish professional football club based in Bełchatów. The club currently competes in the IV liga Łódź after suffering relegation from the III liga in the 2025–26 season.

== History ==
GKS Bełchatów entered Poland's Klasa A in 1977 under the name of Węgiel Brunatny Bełchatów, and gained promotion to the III liga in the 1981–82 season. It took the club another seven years to rise to the II liga (1986/1987 season), before winning a place in the top-tier I liga in 1992. After another spell in II liga, the club again won promotion to the I liga at the end of the 2004–05 season. The club finished the 2005–06 season in 10th place, with 37 points. The following season they challenged for the league title. After spending much of the latter part of the 2006–07 season in first place, they were ultimately overtaken by Zagłębie Lubin and had to settle for second place.

On 11 March 2022, the club, then playing in the II liga, withdrew from the league and did not start playing in the spring round. As a consequence, they were moved to the last place in the 2021–22 season standings and their remaining matches being declared 0–3 forfeits for their opponents. They declared liquidation on 20 April 2022. On 31 May 2022, the Łódź Football Association admitted its academy (Akademia GKS Bełchatów) as its continuator to the Łódź group of the fifth division for the 2022–23 season.

== Honours ==
- Ekstraklasa:
  - Runners-up: 2006–07
- Polish Cup:
  - Runners-up: 1995–96, 1998–99
- Ekstraklasa Cup:
  - Runners-up: 2006–07
- Polish Super Cup:
  - Runners-up: 2007

== Fans and rivalries ==
The fans are called Torfiorze (the "Turfers" in translation). They have friendly relations with fans of Wisła Sandomierz. Their biggest rivals are neighbours RKS Radomsko, and as Bełchatów is located in the Łódź Province, they also have rivalries with the two traditional well-established Łódź teams, ŁKS and Widzew.

== Bełchatów in Europe ==
Season	Competition	Round		Opponent	Home	Away	Aggregate
2007–08	UEFA Cup	1Q	(Georgia (country))	Ameri Tbilisi	2–0	0–2	2–2 (4–2 pen)
2007–08	UEFA Cup	2Q	(Ukraine)	Dnipro Dnipropetrovsk	2–4	1–1	3–5

== Players ==
=== Current squad ===
As of 2 March 2026

Note: Flags indicate national team as defined under FIFA eligibility rules; some limited exceptions apply. Players may hold more than one non-FIFA nationality.

No.	Pos.	Nation	Player
1	GK	POL	Tomasz Kucharski
2	DF	POL	Mateusz Szymorek
3	DF	POL	Norbert Warmuz (on loan from GKS Katowice)
4	DF	POL	Mateusz Lipp
5	MF	POL	Patryk Pytlewski
6	MF	POL	Damian Michalak
7	FW	POL	Kacper Popławski
8	MF	POL	Wiktor Kościuk
9	FW	POL	Nikodem Powroźnik
10	MF	POL	Ricardo Gonçalves do Nascimento
14	MF	POL	Szymon Małecki
16	DF	POL	Marcel Sadziński
17	FW	UKR	Serhiy Napolov

No.	Pos.	Nation	Player
18	DF	POL	Szymon Sarnik
19	DF	POL	Jakub Bartosiński
20	MF	POL	Mikołaj Błaszczyk
21	DF	POL	Adam Dębiński
22	MF	POL	Antoni Koszur
23	GK	POL	Alan Ostrowski
24	MF	POL	Oliwier Kasprzycki
25	MF	JPN	Daichi Kato
27	DF	POL	Wojciech Bogacz
28	MF	POL	Mateusz Wójcik
30	MF	POL	Łukasz Wroński (captain)
33	MF	POL	Natan Wysiński
77	GK	POL	Jakub Wiśniewski

=== Notable players ===
Players who have been capped at any time and/or have over 80 appearances for the club

Notable Polish players

- (Poland) Grzegorz Baran
- (Poland) Bartłomiej Bartosiak
- (Poland) Jacek Berensztajn
- (Poland) Rafał Boguski
- (Poland) Edward Cecot
- (Poland) Mateusz Cetnarski
- (Poland) Grzegorz Fonfara
- (Poland) Łukasz Garguła
- (Poland) Janusz Gol
- (Poland) Artur Golański
- (Poland) Mikołaj Grzelak
- (Poland) Tomasz Jarzębowski
- (Poland) Marcin Komorowski
- (Poland) Kamil Kosowski
- (Poland) Rafał Kosznik
- (Poland) Jacek Krzynówek
- (Poland) Mariusz Kukiełka
- (Poland) Piotr Kuklis
- (Poland) Łukasz Madej
- (Poland) Paweł Magdoń
- (Poland) Michał Mak
- (Poland) Maciej Małkowski
- (Poland) Radosław Matusiak
- (Poland) Filip Modelski
- (Poland) Dawid Nowak
- (Poland) Arkadiusz Piech
- (Poland) Dariusz Pietrasiak
- (Poland) Jacek Popek
- (Poland) Patryk Rachwał
- (Poland) Grzegorz Rasiak
- (Poland) Marek Rzepka
- (Poland) Dariusz Rzeźniczek
- (Poland) Łukasz Sapela
- (Poland) Maciej Stolarczyk
- (Poland) Mateusz Szymorek
- (Poland) Bartosz Ślusarski
- (Poland) Jakub Tosik
- (Poland) Mariusz Ujek
- (Poland) Maciej Wilusz
- (Poland) Łukasz Wroński
- (Poland) Tomasz Wróbel
- (Poland) Marcin Żewłakow

Notable foreign players

- (Armenia) Aghvan Papikyan
- (Bosnia and Herzegovina) Amar Ferhatović
- (Bosnia and Herzegovina) Omer Joldić
- (Croatia) Mate Lacić
- (Honduras) Carlo Costly
- (Latvia) Valerijs Sabala
- (Latvia) Daniils Turkovs
- (Lithuania) Marius Skinderis
- (Lithuania) Dainius Suliauskas
- (Lithuania) Emilijus Zubas
- (North Macedonia) Hristijan Kirovski
- (North Macedonia) Zlatko Tanevski
- (Palestine) Alexis Norambuena
- (Peru) Jhoel Herrera
- (Peru) Alexander Sánchez
- (Senegal) Emile Thiakane
- (United States) Jeremiah White
- (Venezuela) Raúl González

== Managers ==
- (Poland) Włodzimierz Tylak (7 March 1992 – 20 June 1993)
- (Poland) Władysław Lach (1 July 1993 – 31 Aug 1995)
- (Poland) Krzysztof Pawlak (1 Sept 1995 – 30 June 1996)
- (Poland) Janusz Białek (27 July 1996 – 21 Sept 1996)
- (Poland) Marek Pochopień (28 Sept 1996 – 31 Dec 1996)
- (Poland) Bogusław Kaczmarek (5 March 1997 – 14 May 1997)
- (Poland) Jerzy Wyrobek (17 May 1997 – 30 June 1998)
- (Poland) Krzysztof Pawlak (1 July 1998 – 9 May 1999)
- (Poland) Marek Pochopień (10 May 1999 – 30 June 1999)
- (Poland) Orest Lenczyk (1999)
- (Poland) Krzysztof Wolak (1999–2000)
- (Poland) Ryszard Polak (2000)
- (Poland) Jan Złomańczuk, (Poland) Piotr Szarpak & (Poland) Adam Mażysz (9 May 2000 – 22 April 2001)
- (Poland) Józef Dankowski (2001)
- (Poland) Krzysztof Tochel (Oct 2001 – 2 May 2002)
- (Poland) Jacek Zieliński (11 June 2002 – 10 Sept 2002)
- (Poland) Mariusz Kuras (11 Sept 2002 – 6 Oct 2005)
- (Poland) Orest Lenczyk (10 Oct 2005 – 21 March 2008)
- (Poland) Jan Złomańczuk (interim) (21 March 2008 – 21 May 2008)
- (Poland) Paweł Janas (21 May 2008 – 3 Jan 2009)
- (Poland) Rafał Ulatowski (2009 – 24 May 2010)
- (Poland) Maciej Bartoszek (2 June 2010 – 17 June 2011)
- (Poland) Paweł Janas (17 June 2011 – 31 Aug 2011)
- (Poland) Kamil Kiereś (1 Sept 2011 – 25 Sept 2012)
- (Poland) Jan Złomańczuk (25 Sept 2012 – 14 Nov 2012)
- (Poland) Michał Probierz (14 Nov 2012 – 21 Dec 2012)
- (Poland) Kamil Kiereś (9 Jan 2013 – 23 March 2015)
- (Poland) Marek Zub (2015)
- (Poland) Kamil Kiereś (21 May 2015 – 22 June 2015)
- (Poland) Rafał Ulatowski (2015–2016)
- (Poland) Krystian Kierach (interim) (2016)
- (Poland) Andrzej Konwiński (2016)
- (Poland) Mariusz Pawlak (2017–2018)
- (Poland) Artur Derbin (2018–2020)
- (Poland) Marcin Węglewski (2020–2021)
- (Poland) Patryk Rachwał (25 June 2021 – 15 Nov 2021)
- (Poland) Kamil Socha (2021–2022)
- (Poland) Bogdan Jóźwiak (22 June 2022 – 27 April 2024)
- (Poland) Patryk Rachwał (interim) (29 April 2024 – 13 June 2024)
- (Poland) Artur Derbin (13 June 2024 – 5 Jan 2025)
- (Poland) Patryk Rachwał (7 Jan 2025 – 9 June 2025)
- (Poland) Radosław Pęciak (17 June 2025 – 9 November 2025)
- (Poland) Mateusz Milczarek (12 November 2025 – 11 June 2026)
- (Poland) Robert Rogan (15 June 2026 – 7 Sept 2026)
- (Poland) Mikołaj Grzelak (interim) (7 Sept 2026 – present)
