= Žarko Belada =

Montenegrin footballer (born 1977)

Personal information
- Full name: Žarko Belada
- Date of birth: 10 June 1977 (age 49)
- Place of birth: Cetinje, SFR Yugoslavia
- Height: 1.87 m (6 ft 2 in)
- Position: Central defender

Youth career
- 1992–1995: Lovćen

Senior career*
Years	Team	Apps	(Gls)
1995–1997	Lovćen	15	(1)
1997–2000	Mogren	58	(4)
2000–2004	Vojvodina	87	(1)
2004	→ Kabel (loan)		
2005–2007	Wisła Płock	79	(5)
2007–2008	→ Mogren (loan)	20	(0)
2008	Mogren	12	(0)
2009	Lovćen	17	(0)
2010–2012	Cetinje		

International career
- FR Yugoslavia U21
- * Club domestic league appearances and goals

Žarko Belada (Cyrillic: Жарко Белада, born 10 June 1977) is a Montenegrin former professional footballer who played as a defender.

== Club career ==
Born in Cetinje (SR Montenegro, SFR Yugoslavia), he started his career with his local club FK Lovćen in 1992. After becoming a senior player, he joined FK Mogren in 1997, before signing with FK Vojvodina in 2000. Belada had a loan spell with FK Kabel before joining Polish Ekstraklasa side Wisła Płock. He moved back to Mogren during the winter break of the 2008–09 season, before returning to FK Lovćen in 2010. In 2012, he moved to the Montenegrin Second League club FK Cetinje.

== International career ==
He played for the FR Yugoslavia national under-21 football team.

== Honours ==
Wisła Płock

- Polish Cup: 2005–06
- Polish Super Cup: 2006

Mogren

- Montenegrin First League: 2008–09
