= Adam Majewski =

Polish footballer and manager

Personal information
- Full name: Adam Marcin Majewski
- Date of birth: 24 December 1973 (age 52)
- Place of birth: Płock, Poland
- Height: 1.75 m (5 ft 9 in)
- Position: Midfielder

Team information
- Current team: Wisła Płock (manager)

Youth career
- –1991: Petrochemia Płock

Senior career*
Years	Team	Apps	(Gls)
1991–1995	Petrochemia Płock	90	(10)
1995–1999	Lech Poznań	99	(6)
1998	→ Dyskobolia Grodzisk (loan)	17	(1)
1999–2003	Legia Warsaw	107	(6)
2003–2004	Panionios	14	(1)
2004	Wisła Płock	5	(0)
2004–2005	Lech Poznań	13	(0)
2005–2007	Zawisza Bydgoszcz	32	(5)
2007	Wisła Płock	18	(0)
2009–2010	Wisła Płock	22	(0)
Total		417	(29)

International career
2003	Poland	1	(0)

Managerial career
- 2018–2020: Wisła Płock II
- 2020–2021: Stomil Olsztyn
- 2021–2023: Stal Mielec
- 2023–2025: Poland U21
- 2026–: Wisła Płock
- * Club domestic league appearances and goals

Adam Majewski (born 24 December 1973) is a Polish professional football manager and former player who currently manages Ekstraklasa club Wisła Płock.

== Playing career ==
Majewski started his senior career with Wisła Płock. In 1999, after four years with Lech Poznań, he joined their archrivals Legia Warsaw, for whom he made 145 appearances and scored seven goals. After that, he played for Panionios, Lech Poznań, and Zawisza Bydgoszcz.

He spent his final years in Płock before retiring in 2010 after suffering a ligament tear.

== Managerial career ==
Following retirement, Majewski joined Wisła Płock's staff as an assistant coach, under Jan Złomańczuk and Marcin Kaczmarek. In 2018, he became the head coach of Wisła's reserve side, playing in IV liga.

On 10 June 2020, he took charge of I liga side Stomil Olsztyn. He held the role until 6 April 2021.

On 8 July 2021, he was appointed manager of Stal Mielec, replacing Włodzimierz Gąsior.

Six months after being dismissed from Stal in March 2023, on 22 September that year Majewski was named manager of the Poland U21 national team, taking over after Michał Probierz who was promoted to take charge of the senior team. On 15 October 2024, under the lead of Majewski, Poland U21 qualified for the 2025 UEFA European Under-21 Championship hosted in Slovakia. In June 2025, Majewski extended his contract until 2027. After losing all three games at the UEFA Under-21 Euro 2025, Majewski was replaced by Jerzy Brzęczek on 8 August 2025.

On 22 June 2026, Majewski returned to Wisła Płock as their senior team manager on a two-year contract, with an option for a further year.

== Managerial statistics ==
As of match played 22 November 2026

Managerial record by team and tenure
Team	From	To	Record							
Team	From	To	G	W	D	L	GF	GA	GD	Win %
Wisła Płock II	28 June 2018	9 June 2020	55	25	10	20	116	76	+40	45.45
Stomil Olsztyn	10 June 2020	6 April 2021	34	11	6	17	32	47	−15	32.35
Stal Mielec	8 July 2021	20 March 2023	62	17	17	28	69	91	−22	27.42
Poland U21	22 September 2023	8 August 2025	16	6	3	7	32	32	+0	37.50
Wisła Płock	22 June 2026	Present	16	6	3	7	19	25	−6	37.50
Career total			183	65	39	79	272	274	−2	35.52

== Honours ==
=== Player ===
Legia Warsaw

- Ekstraklasa: 2001–02
- Polish League Cup: 2001–02

=== Manager ===
Wisła Płock II

- Polish Cup (Płock regionals): 2018–19, 2019–20
