= 2005–06 Polish Cup =

Tournament details
- Country: Poland
- Teams: 65

Final positions
- Champions: Wisła Płock
- Runners-up: Zagłębie Lubin

Tournament statistics
- Matches played: 90
- Goals scored: 265 (2.94 per match)
- Top goal scorer(s): Piotr Włodarczyk (7 goals)

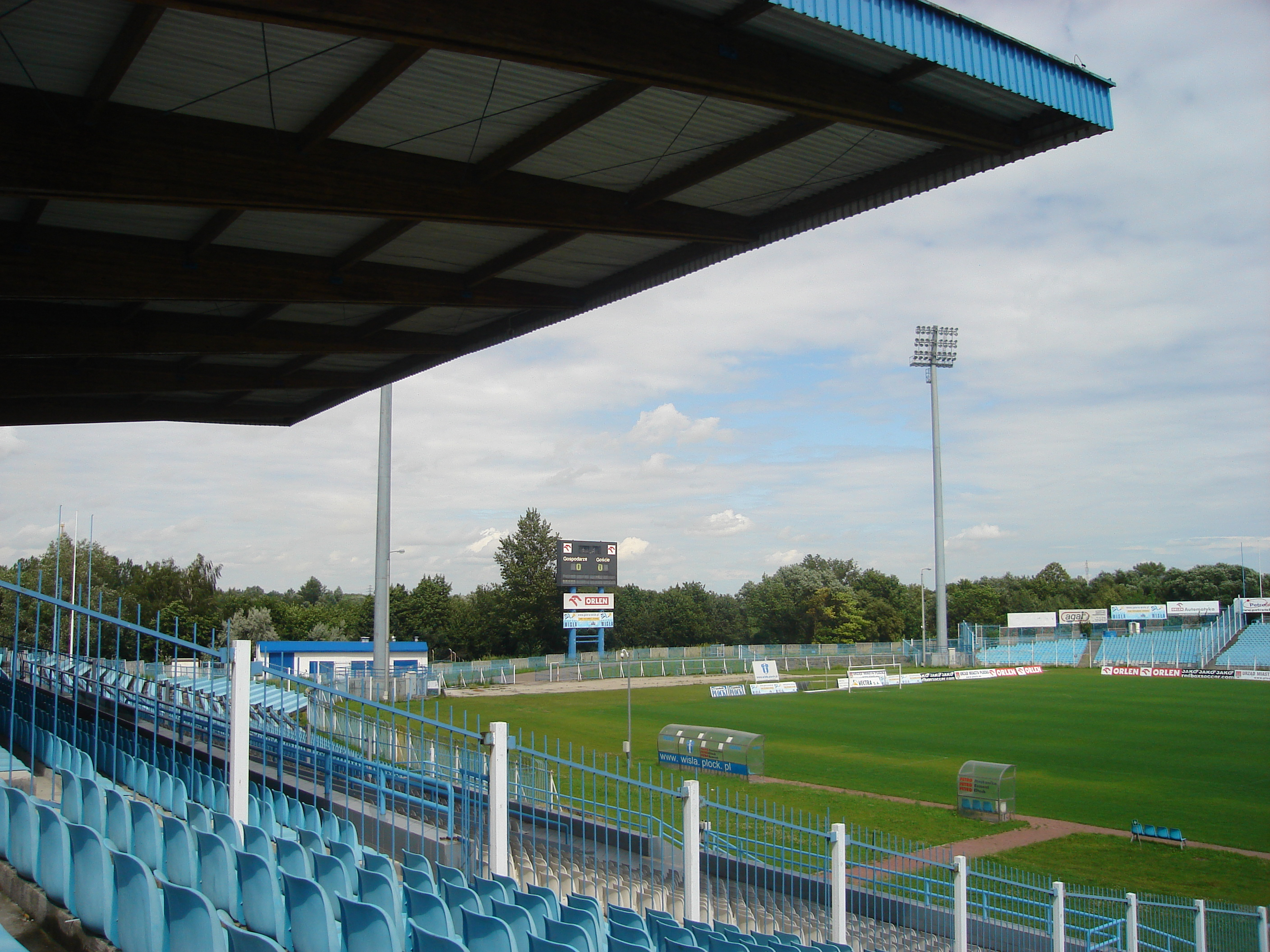
Kazimierz Górski Stadium, home ground of Wisła Płock.

The fifty-second season of the annual Polish Cup competition was contested in 2005–06. It began on 2 August 2005 with the Preliminary Round and ended on 3 May 2006 with second leg of the Final, played at Stadion im. Kazimierza Górskiego, Płock. The winners qualified for the first qualifying round of the UEFA Cup.

== Preliminary round ==
The matches took place on 15 August 2005.

Team 1	Score	Team 2
15 August 2005
Supraślanka Supraśl	1–3	OKS Stomil Olsztyn
Mazowsze Płock	1–0	Omega Kleszczów
Warta Sieradz	3–1	Jagiellonia II Białystok
Drwęca Nowe Miasto Lubawskie	1–0	Korona Ostrołęka
Wierzyca Pelplin	5–1	Brzysko-Rol Brzyskorzystewko
Unia Janikowo	w/o^{1}	Sława Sławno
Tur Turek	5–2	Polonia Gdańsk
Flota Świnoujście	2–1	Promień Opalenica
Odra Opole	w/o^{2}	Promień Żary
Arka Nowa Sól	2–0 (a.e.t.)	Górnik/Zagłębie Wałbrzych
Nysa Zgorzelec	2–1	BKS Stal Bielsko-Biała
GKS Tychy	0–1	LKS Poborszów
Wierna Małogoszcz	1–0	Glinik Gorlice
Tłoki Gorzyce	4–1	GKS Sitkówka-Nowiny
Hetman Zamość	2–1	Żurawianka Żurawica
Okocimski KS Brzesko	5–1	Górnik II Łęczna

Notes

- Note 1: Sława Sławno withdrew from the competition.
- Note 2: Promień Żary withdrew from the competition.

== Round 1 ==
The matches took place on 9, 10 and 30 August 2005.

Team 1	Score	Team 2
9 August 2005
Tur Turek	2–1	Arka Gdynia
Warta Sieradz	3–2	Widzew Łódź
Flota Świnoujście	1–3 (a.e.t.)	Podbeskidzie Bielsko-Biała
Nysa Zgorzelec	1–3	Zagłębie Sosnowiec
LKS Poborszów	0–2	Kujawiak Włocławek
Arka Nowa Sól	0–3	KSZO Ostrowiec Świętokrzyski
Hetman Zamość	2–1	Świt Nowy Dwór Mazowiecki
Wierna Małogoszcz	1–0	Górnik Polkowice
Drwęca Nowe Miasto Lubawskie	2–1	Piast Gliwice
Okocimski KS Brzesko	4–2 (a.e.t.)	Ruch Chorzów
OKS Stomil Olsztyn	4–2	Szczakowianka Jaworzno
Wierzyca Pelplin	0–4	Radomiak Radom
Tłoki Gorzyce	4–1	MKS Mława
Mazowsze Płock	w/o^{1}	RKS Radomsko
10 August 2005
Unia Janikowo	1–1 (a.e.t.) (4–5 p)	ŁKS Łódź
30 August 2005
Odra Opole	0–0 (a.e.t.) (2–4 p)	Jagiellonia Białystok

Notes

- Note 1: RKS Radomsko withdrew from the competition.

== Round 2 ==
The first legs took place between 20 and 27 September, when the second legs took place on 25 and 26 October 2005.

Team 1	Agg.	Team 2	1st leg	2nd leg
GKS Bełchatów	0–2	Podbeskidzie Bielsko-Biała	0–1	0–1
Warta Sieradz	0–7	Wisła Płock	0–2	0–5
Wierna Małogoszcz	1–4	Zagłębie Lubin	1–1	0–3
Cracovia	0–2	Kujawiak Włocławek	0–0	0–2
ŁKS Łódź	2–6	Pogoń Szczecin	1–4	1–2
KSZO Ostrowiec Świętokrzyski	1–4	Legia Warsaw	1–2	0–2
Odra Wodzisław	7–1	Zagłębie Sosnowiec	4–1	3–0
Mazowsze Płock	0–6	Korona Kielce	0–3	0–3
OKS Stomil Olsztyn	1–11	Dyskobolia Grodzisk Wlkp.	1–6	0–5
Tłoki Gorzyce	0–6	Wisła Kraków	0–3	0–3
Drwęca Nowe Miasto Lubawskie	0–6	Amica Wronki	0–3	0–3
Okocimski KS Brzesko	4–7	Lech Poznań	3–3	1–4
Jagiellonia Białystok	3–1	Górnik Łęczna	1–0	2–1 (a.e.t.)
Górnik Zabrze	0–4	Radomiak Radom	0–1	0–3
Polonia Warsaw	2–1	Tur Turek	2–0	0–1

== Round 3 ==
The first legs took place between 8 and 11 November, when the second legs took place between 15 and 30 November 2005.

Team 1	Agg.	Team 2	1st leg	2nd leg
Wisła Płock	3–0	Podbeskidzie Bielsko-Biała	3–0	0–0
Jagiellonia Białystok	4–5	Polonia Warsaw	1–3	3–2
Zagłębie Lubin	2–1	Wisła Kraków	1–1	1–0
Kujawiak Włocławek	2–2 (a)	Pogoń Szczecin	1–0	1–2
Lech Poznań	4–0	Radomiak Radom	2–0	2–0
Amica Wronki	2–3	Odra Wodzisław	0–0	2–3
Dyskobolia Grodzisk Wlkp.	3–4	Korona Kielce	2–2	1–2
Hetman Zamość	0–10	Legia Warsaw	0–4	0–6

== Quarter-finals ==
The first legs took place between 22 November and 13 December, when the second legs took place between 29 November 2005 and 7 March 2006.

Team 1	Agg.	Team 2	1st leg	2nd leg
Lech Poznań	1–0	Odra Wodzisław	1–0	0–0
Wisła Płock	2–1	Kujawiak Włocławek	1–0	1–1 (a.e.t.)
Legia Warsaw	2–3	Korona Kielce	2–0	0–3 (a.e.t.)
Zagłębie Lubin	3–1	Polonia Warsaw	0–1	3–0

== Semi-finals ==
The first legs took place on 14 and 15 April, when the second legs took place on 21 and 22 April 2006.

Team 1	Agg.	Team 2	1st leg	2nd leg
Zagłębie Lubin	2–0	Korona Kielce	2–0	0–0
Wisła Płock	1–0	Lech Poznań	0–0	1–0

== Final ==
=== First leg ===
26 April 2006
17:00 CEST (UTC+02:00)

Zagłębie Lubin	2–3	Wisła Płock
Jackiewicz 63'; Arboleda 77'	Report	Jeleń 1', 56'; Belada 89'

Stadion Zagłębia Lubin, Lubin
Attendance: 8,000
Referee: Tomasz Pacuda (Częstochowa)

=== Second leg ===
3 May 2006
15:45 CEST (UTC+02:00)

Wisła Płock	3–1	Zagłębie Lubin
Magdoń 68'; Gevorgyan 73'; Truszczyński 86'	Report	Piszczek 82'

Stadion im. Kazimierza Górskiego, Płock
Attendance: 8,520
Referee: Krzysztof Słupik (Tarnów)

Wisła Płock won 6–3 on aggregate.
