= Klaudia Grzelak =

Polish volleyball player (born 1996)

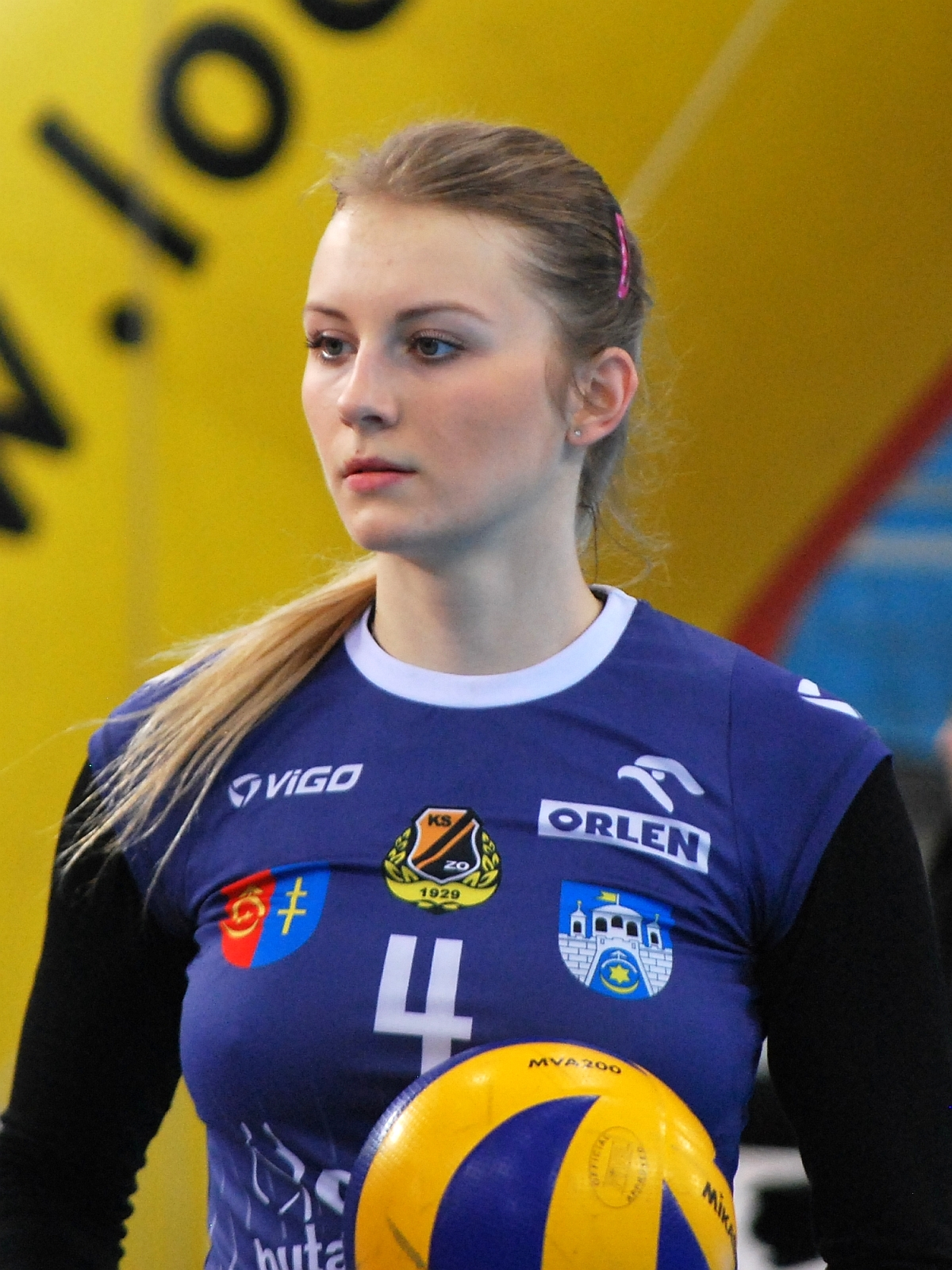
Grzelak in 2015

Klaudia Grzelak (born 12 February 1996) is a Polish volleyball player. She plays for LTS Legionovia Legionowo in the Orlen Liga.

Grzelak was part of the winning Polish team at the 2013 Girls' Youth European Volleyball Championship.
