= Wierna Małogoszcz =

Polish football club

- Full name: Miejski Klub Sportowy; Wierna Małogoszcz
- Founded: 1978; 47 years ago
- Ground: ul. Włoszczowska 1
- Capacity: 1,400
- Chairman: Sławomir Trybek
- Manager: Paweł Bień
- League: IV liga Świętokrzyskie
- 2023–24: IV liga Świętokrzyskie, 12th of 18
- Website: http://mks-wierna.malogoszcz.eu

Wierna Małogoszcz is a Polish football club from Małogoszcz. They currently play in the fifth-tier IV liga Świętokrzyskie.

== Honours ==
- Polish Cup
  - Round of 32: 2005–06
