= Wisła Płock =

Polish football club

- Full name: Wisła Płock Spółka Akcyjna
- Nicknames: Nafciarze (The Oilers); Petra
- Founded: 1947; 79 years ago as Elektryczność Płock
- Ground: Kazimierz Górski Stadion
- Capacity: 15,004
- Chairman: Maciej Wiącek
- Manager: Adam Majewski
- League: Ekstraklasa
- 2025–26: Ekstraklasa, 8th of 18
- Website: www.wisla-plock.pl/pl
Home colours	Away colours

Wisła Płock Spółka Akcyjna (Wisła Płock S.A.), commonly referred to as Wisła Płock (Polish pronunciation: [ˈviswa ˈpwɔt͡sk]), is a Polish professional football club based in Płock, Masovian Voivodeship. They currently compete in the Ekstraklasa, the top tier of the Polish football league system.

== Previous names ==
- 1947: Elektryczność Płock
- 1950: ZS Ogniwo Płock (Elektryczność + ZS Ogniwo)
- spring 1955: ZS Sparta Płock (ZS Ogniwo + ZS Sparta)
- autumn 1955: PKS [Płocki KS] Wisła Płock
- 1963: ZKS Wisła Płock
- 1 January 1992: ZKS Petrochemia Płock
- 1 July 1999: KS Petro Płock
- 27 June 2000: Orlen Płock
- 7 June 2002: ZKS Wisła Płock

== Honours ==
=== Domestic ===
- Ekstraklasa
  - 4th place: 2004–05
  - 5th place: 2003–04, 2017–18
- I liga
  - Play-off winners: 2024–25
- Polish Cup
  - Winners: 2005–06
  - Runners-up: 2002–03
- Polish Super Cup
  - Winners: 2006

== European record ==
Competition	App	Games	Won	Drawn	Lost	GF	GA
UEFA Cup	1	6	1	4	1	7	7

Season	Competition	Round	Opponent	Home	Away	Agg
2003–04	UEFA Cup	QR	(Latvia) Ventspils	2–2	1–1	3–3 (a)
2005–06	UEFA Cup	2Q	(Switzerland) Grasshoppers	3–2	0–1	3–3 (a)
2006–07	UEFA Cup	2Q	(Ukraine) Chornomorets Odesa	1–1	0–0	1–1 (a)

== Players ==
=== Current squad ===
As of 9 September 2026

Note: Flags indicate national team as defined under FIFA eligibility rules; some limited exceptions apply. Players may hold more than one non-FIFA nationality.

No.	Pos.	Nation	Player
3	DF	POL	Marcin Flis
4	DF	SWE	Marcus Haglind-Sangré
5	MF	POR	Sidnei Tavares (on loan from Blackburn Rovers)
6	MF	POL	Krystian Pomorski
7	FW	POL	Olaf Kobacki
8	MF	ESP	Dani Pacheco
9	FW	AUS	Deni Jurić
10	FW	BIH	Said Hamulić
11	MF	ESP	Jime
12	GK	POL	Rafał Leszczyński
16	MF	POL	Fabian Hiszpański
17	MF	POL	Adam Radwański
18	MF	CRO	Jurica Pršir
19	DF	KOS	Dion Gallapeni
20	FW	POL	Łukasz Sekulski (captain)
21	DF	SLO	Žan Rogelj

No.	Pos.	Nation	Player
22	MF	POL	Kacper Błaszkiewicz
23	MF	POL	Patryk Kun
24	MF	POL	Nikodem Rogowski
26	GK	POL	Jakub Burek
27	FW	POL	Bartosz Borowski
34	DF	POR	Afonso Silva
35	DF	POL	Marcin Kamiński
41	DF	POL	Marcin Więckowski
44	DF	POL	Przemysław Misiak
57	MF	NGR	Samuel Akere (on loan from Widzew Łódź)
62	MF	POL	Michał Król
77	FW	POL	Marcin Kościelecki
82	GK	POL	Szymon Wadas
88	MF	GRE	Kyriakos Savvidis
91	MF	BLR	Gleb Kuchko

=== Out on loan ===
Note: Flags indicate national team as defined under FIFA eligibility rules; some limited exceptions apply. Players may hold more than one non-FIFA nationality.

No.	Pos.	Nation	Player
97	GK	POL	Oskar Klat (at Olimpia Grudziądz until 30 June 2027)
—	MF	POL	Oskar Dari (at Sokół Kleczew until 30 June 2027)

=== Notable players ===
Players who have been capped and/or have won honours with the club.

Poland

- Vahan Gevorgyan, forward, member of the Poland national team
- Dariusz Gęsior, midfielder, member of the Poland national team at the 1992 Summer Olympics, where he won a silver medal
- Bartłomiej Grzelak, forward, member of the Poland national team
- (Poland) Robert Gubiec
- Ireneusz Jeleń, forward, member of the Poland national team; played at the 2006 FIFA World Cup
- (Poland) Marcin Kamiński
- (Poland) Krzysztof Kazimierczak
- (Poland) Arkadiusz Klimek
- (Poland) Andrzej Kobylański
- (Poland) Rafał Leszczyński
- Wojciech Łobodziński, midfielder, member of the Poland national team; played at UEFA EURO 2008
- (Poland) Adam Majewski
- Radosław Matusiak, forward, member of the Poland national team
- (Poland) Wiktor Nowak
- Sławomir Peszko, midfielder, member of the Poland national team; played at the UEFA Euro 2016 and the 2018 FIFA World Cup
- Patryk Rachwał, midfielder, member of the Poland national team
- Arkadiusz Reca, defender, member of the Poland national team
- Marek Saganowski, forward, member of the Poland national team; played at UEFA EURO 2008
- (Poland) Paweł Sobczak
- Radosław Sobolewski, midfielder, member of the Poland national team; played at the 2006 FIFA World Cup
- Damian Szymański, midfielder, member of the Poland national team; played at the 2022 FIFA World Cup and the UEFA Euro 2024
- Marcin Wasilewski, defender, member of the Poland national team; played at UEFA EURO 2008
- (Poland) Jakub Wierzchowski
- (Poland) Jerzy Wojnecki

Australia

- (Australia) Deni Jurić

Belarus

- (Belarus) Mikalay Branfilaw
- (Belarus) Gleb Kuchko

Bulgaria

- (Bulgaria) Dimitar Iliev
- (Bulgaria) Boris Kondev
- (Bulgaria) Stefan Todorov

Bosnia and Herzegovina

- (Bosnia and Herzegovina) Said Hamulić
- (Bosnia and Herzegovina) Bojan Nastić
- (Bosnia and Herzegovina) Nenad Studen

Czech Republic

- (Czech Republic) Tomáš Došek
- (Czech Republic) Patrik Gedeon
- (Czech Republic) Tomáš Michálek
- (Czech Republic) Josef Obajdin
- (Czech Republic) Lumír Sedláček

Equatorial Guinea

- (Equatorial Guinea) Iban Salvador

Faroe Islands

- (Faroe Islands) Andrias Edmundsson

Georgia

- (Georgia (country)) Mamia Jikia
- (Georgia (country)) Aleksandre Kalandadze

Guinea

- (Guinea) José Kanté

Iraq

- (Iraq) Amin Al-Hamawi

Kosovo

- (Kosovo) Dion Gallapeni

Lithuania

- (Lithuania) Gražvydas Mikulėnas
- (Lithuania) Aidas Preikšaitis
- (Lithuania) Raimondas Vilėniškis

Montenegro

- (Montenegro) Žarko Belada
- (Montenegro) Marko Čolaković
- (Montenegro) Nemanja Mijušković

Nigeria

- (Nigeria) Emmanuel Ekwueme

Serbia

- (Serbia) Marjan Jugović
- (Serbia) Mitar Peković
- (Serbia) Predrag Vujović

Slovakia

- (Slovakia) Peter Lérant

Slovenia

- (Slovenia) Žan Rogelj

Ukraine

- (Ukraine) Lubomir Ivansky

== Coaching staff ==
As of 4 July 2026

Position	Staff
Manager	(Poland) Adam Majewski
Assistant coaches	(Poland) Bartłomiej Kondracki (Poland) Maciej Serafiński (Poland) Karol Szweda (Poland) Marcin Zubek
Goalkeeping coach	(Poland) Mariusz Liberda
Fitness coach	(Poland) Dariusz Fabianowicz
Match analyst	(Poland) Bartosz Golat
Head of medical department	(Poland) Kamil Pasoń
Physiotherapists	(Poland) Katarzyna Grzybowska (Poland) Przemysław Domański
Masseur	(Poland) Krzysztof Mysera
Team manager	(Poland) Piotr Soczewka
Kitman	(Poland) Magdalena Pawlak

== Managerial history ==
- (Poland) Tadeusz Rutkowski (1947–1948)
- (Poland) Stefan Świtalski (1948–1953)
- (Poland) Zdzisław Musiał & Eugeniusz Bartoszewski (1954–1957)
- (Poland) Aleksander Czyżewski (1958)
- (Poland) Józef Ciećwierz (1959–1962)
- (Poland) Leszek Goździk (1963)
- (Poland) Kazimierz Drygalski (1963–1967)
- (Poland) Stanisław Tymowicz (1967–1971)
- (Poland) Ignacy Urban (1971–1972)
- (Poland) Wojciech Przybyliński (1972–1976)
- (Poland) Stanisław Tymowicz (1976)
- (Poland) Jurand Lubawy (1976)
- (Poland) Janusz Walczak (1977)
- (Poland) Marek Śledzianowski (1977–1978)
- (Poland) Tadeusz Prosowski (1978–1982)
- (Poland) Tadeusz Błażejewski (1982–1983)
- (Poland) Antoni Hermanowicz (1983)
- (Poland) Szczepan Targowski (1983)
- (Poland) Jan Pieszko (1984)
- (Poland) Jan Franke (1984)
- (Poland) Antoni Korsewicz (1985–1986)
- (Poland) Szczepan Targowski (caretaker) (1986)
- (Poland) Witold Sokołowski (1986–1987)
- (Poland) Włodzimierz Duszyński (1987–1988)
- (Poland) Grzegorz Nowaczyk (caretaker) (1988)
- (Poland) Zbigniew Kociołek (1988–1989)
- (Poland) Włodzimierz Małowiejski (1990–1992)
- (Poland) Grzegorz Wenerski (1992–1994)
- (Poland) Witold Słabkowski (caretaker) (1994)
- (Poland) Hubert Kostka (1995)
- (Poland) Zbigniew Stefaniak (1995)
- (Poland) Grzegorz Wenerski (caretaker) (1995)
- (Poland) Wiesław Wojno (1995–1996)
- (Poland) Leszek Harabasz (1996–1997)
- (Poland) Bogusław Kaczmarek (1997–1998)
- (Poland) Tadeusz Prosowski (caretaker) (1998)
- (Poland) Jerzy Masztaler (1998)
- (Poland) Szczepan Targowski (1998)
- (Poland) Jerzy Kasalik (1999)
- (Poland) Szczepan Targowski (caretaker) (1999)
- (Poland) Adam Topolski (1999–2000)
- (Poland) Albin Mikulski (2000)
- (Poland) Janusz Kubot (caretaker) (2000)
- (Poland) Dariusz Wdowczyk (2000–2001)
- (Poland) Andrzej Wiśniewski (2001)
- (Poland) Janusz Kubot (caretaker) (2001)
- (Poland) Wiesław Wojno (2001–2002)
- (Poland) Mieczysław Broniszewski (2002–2003)
- (Poland) Dariusz Janowski (caretaker) (2003)
- (Poland) Mirosław Jabłoński (2003–2005)
- (Czech Republic) Josef Csaplár (2005–2007)
- (Poland) Przemysław Cecherz (caretaker) (2007)
- (Poland) Czesław Jakołcewicz (2007)
- (Poland) Mariusz Bekas (2007)
- (Poland) Leszek Ojrzyński (2007–2008)
- (Poland) Mariusz Bekas (2008)
- (Poland) Mirosław Jabłoński (2008)
- (Poland) Piotr Szczechowicz (2008–2009)
- (Poland) Włodzimierz Tylak (2009)
- (Poland) Dariusz Kubicki (2009)
- (Poland) Jan Złomańczuk (2009–2010)
- (Poland) Jarosław Araszkiewicz (2010–2011)
- (Poland) Mieczysław Broniszewski (2011)
- (Czech Republic) Libor Pala (2011–2012)
- (Poland) Marcin Kaczmarek (2012–2017)
- (Poland) Jerzy Brzęczek (2017–2018)
- (Poland) Dariusz Dźwigała (2018)
- (Spain) Kibu Vicuña (2018–2019)
- (Poland) Leszek Ojrzyński (2019)
- (Poland) Patryk Kniat (caretaker) (2019)
- (Poland) Radosław Sobolewski (2019–2021)
- (Poland) Maciej Bartoszek (2021–2022)
- (Poland) Łukasz Nadolski (caretaker) (2022)
- (Slovakia) Pavol Staňo (2022–2023)
- (Poland) Marek Saganowski (2023)
- (Poland) Dariusz Żuraw (2023–2024)
- (Poland) Mariusz Misiura (2024–2026)
- (Poland) Adam Majewski (2026–present)

== See also ==
- Football in Poland
- List of football teams
