= Sokół Aleksandrów Łódzki =

Polish football club

- Full name: Towarzystwo Sportowe Sokół Aleksandrów Łódzki
- Founded: 1998; 28 years ago
- Ground: Włodzimierz Smolarek Stadium
- Capacity: 2,086
- Chairman: Dariusz Szulc
- Manager: Radosław Koźlik
- League: IV liga Łódź
- 2025–26: IV liga Łódź, 2nd of 18
- Website: tssokol.pl

Sokół Aleksandrów Łódzki is a professional football club based in Aleksandrów Łódzki, Poland. They compete in the IV liga Łódź, the fifth tier of the Polish football league system.
