= IV liga Łódź =

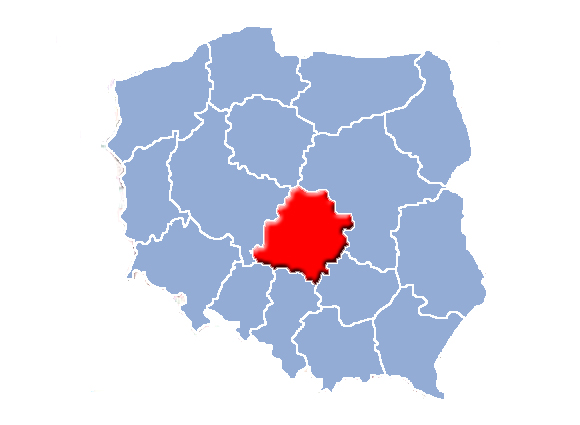
- Organising body: Łódź Football Association
- Founded: 2000; 26 years ago
- Country: Poland
- Number of clubs: 18
- Level on pyramid: 5
- Promotion to: III liga, group I
- Relegation to: Regional league Łódź; Regional league Piotrków Trybunalski; Regional league Sieradz; Regional league Skierniewice
- Current champions: Pelikan Łowicz (1st title) (2025–26)
- Most championships: KS Paradyż; Sokół Aleksandrów Łódzki; Warta Sieradz (2 titles each)

IV liga Łódź group (grupa łódzka) is one of the groups of IV liga, the fifth level of Polish football league system.

The league was created in the 2000–01 season after a new administrative division of Poland was introduced. Until the end of the 2007–08 season, IV liga was the fourth level of league system, but this was changed with the formation of the Ekstraklasa as the top-level league in Poland.

The clubs from Łódź Voivodeship compete in this group. The winner of the league is promoted to the first group of III liga. The bottom teams are relegated to one of the four regional league groups from Łódź Voivodeship. These groups are Łódź, Piotrków Trybunalski, Sieradz and Skierniewice.

== Season 2000–01 ==
Łódź group was created with the following 20 clubs:

- (R) relegated from III liga (Łódź-Katowice): GKS II Bełchatów and Start Łódź.
- moved from 'Kalisz-Łódź-Piotrków Tryb.-Sieradz' group: Bzura Ozorków, MKP Zgierz, Pogoń Zduńska Wola, Start Brzeziny, Stasiak Gomunice, Warta Działoszyn, Warta Sieradz, Widzew II Łódź, Włókniarz-Trzy Korony Pabianice and Woy Bukowiec Opoczyński.
- moved from 'Konin-Płock-Skierniewice-Włocławek' group: Górnik Łęczyca, Huragan Bobrowniki, Mazovia Rawa Mazowiecka and MKS Kutno.
- (P) promoted from Liga okręgowa: Stal Głowno (Łódź), Ceramika Paradyż (Piotrków Tryb.), Jutrzenka Warta (Sieradz) and Pogoń Rogów (Skierniewice).

Pos	Club	M	P	W	D	L	GF	GA	GD
1	Stasiak Gomunice	36	84	27	3	6	90	34	56
2	Widzew II Łódź	36	69	22	3	11	94	51	43
3	Ceramika Paradyż (P)	36	67	20	7	9	74	47	27
4	Stal Głowno (P)	36	65	20	5	11	70	41	29
5	Bzura Ozorków	36	64	19	7	10	59	33	26
6	Pogoń Zduńska Wola	36	57	16	9	11	67	47	20
7	Warta Działoszyn	36	52	16	4	16	56	77	-21
8	Warta Sieradz	36	51	15	6	15	83	64	19
9	GKS II Bełchatów (R)	36	51	14	9	13	54	51	3
10	Start Brzeziny	36	51	14	9	13	53	53	0
11	Start Łódź (R)	36	50	15	5	16	54	63	-9
12	Włókniarz-Trzy Korony Pabianice	36	50	13	11	12	50	53	-3
13	Górnik Łęczyca	36	49	15	4	17	38	45	-7
14	Mazovia Rawa Mazowiecka	36	46	13	7	16	57	64	-7
15	MKS Kutno	36	41	12	5	19	44	73	-29
16	Jutrzenka Warta (P)	36	39	12	3	21	51	76	-25
17	MKP Zgierz	36	33	8	9	19	32	57	-25
18	Pogoń Rogów (P)	36	25	6	7	23	53	94	-41
19	Woy Bukowiec Opoczyński	36	24	7	3	26	40	96	-56
20	Huragan Bobrowniki	0	0	0	0	0	0	0	0

Source: mogiel.net

- Huragan Bobrowniki withdrew in mid-season. Its results were cancelled.
- Woy Bukowiec Opoczyński eventually stayed in IV liga after the merge with newcomer Ceramika II Opoczno before start of the next season. Woy became legal successor of this merge.

== Season 2001–02 ==
League reduced to 18 teams.
New clubs:

- (R) relegated from III liga "Łódź-Mazovia-Podlasie-Warmia/Masuria" group: WKS Wieluń and Włókniarz Konstantynów Łódzki.
- (P) promoted from Liga okręgowa: Sokół Aleksandrów Łódzki ("Łódź II" group), Victoria Szadek ("Sieradz" group) and Widok Skierniewice ("Skierniewice" group).

Pos	Club	M	P	W	D	L	GF	GA	GD
1	Stal Głowno	34	79	25	4	5	88	33	55
2	Ceramika Paradyż	34	74	23	5	6	96	34	62
3	Włókniarz Konstantynów Łódzki (R)	34	72	23	3	8	71	33	38
4	Pogoń Zduńska Wola	34	60	18	6	10	85	42	43
5	GKS II Bełchatów	34	56	17	5	12	61	50	11
6	Widzew II Łódź	34	56	16	8	10	67	70	-3
7	Start Łódź	34	54	16	6	12	77	55	22
8	Warta Działoszyn	34	49	14	7	13	62	54	8
9	WKS Wieluń (R)	34	48	13	9	12	51	42	9
10	Ceramika II/Woy Bukowiec Opoczyński	34	46	15	1	18	71	64	7
11	Górnik Łęczyca	34	45	14	3	17	41	55	-14
12	Bzura Ozorków	34	45	13	6	15	43	41	2
13	Sokół Aleksandrów Łódzki (P)	34	45	12	9	13	46	52	-6
14	Start Brzeziny	34	45	12	9	13	35	34	1
15	Victoria Szadek (P)	34	44	11	11	12	40	52	-12
16	Włókniarz-Trzy Korony Pabianice	34	29	8	5	21	48	77	-29
17	Warta Sieradz	34	16	4	4	26	39	114	-75
18	Widok Skierniewice (P)	34	4	1	1	32	23	142	-119

Source: IV liga 2001/2002, grupa: łódzka

- Ceramika II Opoczno promoted from "Piotrków Tryb." group merged with Woy Bukowiec Opoczyński to form Ceramika II/Woy Bukowiec Opoczyński. Woy became the legal successor of this merge.

== Season 2002–03 ==
New clubs:

- (R) relegated from III liga "Łódź-Mazovia-Podlasie-Warmia/Masuria" group: LKS Gomunice.
- (P) promoted from Liga okręgowa: ŁKS II Łódź ("Łódź" group II), RKS II Radomsko ("Piotrków Tryb." group), Ekolog Wojsławice ("Sieradz" group) and Mazovia Rawa Mazowiecka ("Skierniewice" group).

Pos	Club	M	P	W	D	L	GF	GA	GD
1	Pogoń Zduńska Wola	34	75	23	6	5	84	39	45
2	Ceramika Paradyż	34	75	23	6	5	78	25	53
3	WKS Wieluń	34	60	17	9	8	58	27	31
4	Ceramika II/Woy Bukowiec Opoczyński	34	59	17	8	9	51	36	15
5	Włókniarz Konstantynów Łódzki	34	59	17	8	9	48	35	13
6	Bzura Ozorków	34	52	15	7	12	42	38	4
7	LKS Gomunice (R)	34	47	14	5	15	47	45	2
8	Sokół Aleksandrów Łódzki	34	46	13	7	14	44	38	6
9	ŁKS II Łódź (P)	34	45	12	9	13	47	46	1
10	GKS II Bełchatów	34	45	13	6	15	41	49	-8
11	RKS II Radomsko (P)	34	40	11	7	16	46	57	-11
12	Widzew II Łódź	34	40	10	10	14	51	48	3
13	Warta Działoszyn	34	39	11	6	17	39	78	-39
14	Ekolog Wojsławice (P)	34	39	10	9	15	34	51	-17
15	Górnik Łęczyca	34	39	11	6	17	43	59	-16
16	Start Brzeziny	34	39	11	6	17	36	52	-16
17	Mazovia Rawa Mazowiecka (P)	34	29	7	8	19	40	76	-36
18	Start Łódź	34	24	5	9	20	30	60	-30

Source: IV liga 2002/2003, grupa: łódzka

- Mazovia Rawa Mazowiecka eventually stayed in IV liga after the merge with newcomer Białka Biała Rawska before start of the next season. Mazovia became legal successor of this merge.

== Season 2003–04 ==
New clubs:
- (P) promoted from Liga okręgowa: MKP Zgierz ("Łódź II" group), Omega Kleszczów ("Piotrków Tryb." group) and Victoria Szadek ("Sieradz" group).

FINAL TABLE:

Pos	Club	M	P	W	D	L	GF	GA	GD
1	Ceramika Paradyż	34	80	24	8	2	74	18	56
2	Włókniarz Konstantynów Łódzki	34	67	19	10	5	64	28	36
3	Ekolog Wojsławice	34	58	18	4	12	52	42	10
4	WKS Wieluń	34	56	17	5	12	56	42	14
5	LKS Gomunice	34	53	16	5	13	59	39	20
6	Sokół Aleksandrów Łódzki	34	53	15	8	11	53	44	9
7	Górnik Łęczyca	34	51	16	3	15	48	51	-3
8	Widzew II Łódź	34	51	15	6	13	57	47	10
9	Bzura Ozorków	34	51	15	6	13	57	34	23
10	Omega Kleszczów (P)	34	49	14	7	13	47	48	-1
11	MKP Zgierz (P)	34	47	14	5	15	43	41	2
12	ŁKS II Łódź	34	46	13	7	14	56	51	5
13	Ceramika II/Woy Bukowiec Opoczyński	34	45	13	6	15	39	42	-3
14	Warta Działoszyn	34	45	14	3	17	41	56	-15
15	GKS II Bełchatów	34	45	14	3	17	53	52	1
16	RKS II Radomsko	34	33	9	6	19	38	69	-31
17	Victoria Szadek (P)	34	25	7	4	23	34	72	-38
18	Białka/Mazovia Rawa Mazowiecka	34	14	4	2	28	34	129	-95

- Białka Biała Rawska promoted from "Skierniewice" group merged with Mazovia Rawa Mazowiecka to form Białka/Mazovia Rawa Mazowiecka. Mazovia became legal successor of this merge.
- Ceramika II/Woy Bukowiec Opoczyński in the second half of the season played under the name Ceramika Opoczno since it became the first team of this club. Nevertheless, Woy was still legal successor of the club.

== Season 2004–05 ==
New clubs:
- (R) relegated from III liga "Łódź-Mazovia-Podlasie-Warmia/Masuria" group: Pogoń Zduńska Wola.
- (P) promoted from Liga okręgowa: Włókniarz-Trzy Korony Pabianice ("Łódź I" group), Concordia Piotrków Trybunalski ("Piotrków Tryb." group), Warta Sieradz ("Sieradz" group) and Unia II Skierniewice ("Skierniewice" group).

FINAL TABLE:

Pos	Club	M	P	W	D	L	GF	GA	GD
1	Górnik Łęczyca	34	69	21	6	7	56	24	32
2	Concordia Piotrków Trybunalski (P)	34	65	19	8	7	72	32	40
3	Sokół Aleksandrów Łódzki	34	62	18	8	8	74	36	38
4	Włókniarz Konstantynów Łódzki	34	60	17	9	8	56	27	29
5	Ekolog Wojsławice	34	60	18	6	10	47	28	19
6	Włókniarz-Trzy Korony Pabianice (P)	34	58	17	7	10	60	38	22
7	Woy Opoczno	34	53	14	11	9	41	31	10
8	Omega Kleszczów	34	51	14	9	11	52	40	12
9	ŁKS II Łódź	34	51	16	3	15	40	40	0
10	Widzew II Łódź	34	50	14	8	12	55	53	2
11	Warta Sieradz (P)	34	48	13	9	12	55	40	15
12	Bzura Ozorków	34	47	14	5	15	51	51	0
13	MKP Zgierz	34	44	12	8	14	45	49	-4
14	LKS Gomunice	34	39	11	6	17	36	46	-10
15	Warta Działoszyn	34	37	10	7	17	42	57	-15
16	WKS Wieluń	34	26	7	5	22	32	76	-44
17	Unia II Skierniewice (P)	34	22	6	4	24	27	84	-57
18	Pogoń Zduńska Wola (R)	34	4	1	3	30	9	116	-107

- Table includes 3 two-sided walkovers (between WKS, Unia II and Pogoń)
- Ceramika Opoczno (Ceramika II/Woy Bukowiec Opoczyński) changed name into Woy Opoczno.
- Unia II Skierniewice withdrew in mid-season.
- WKS Wieluń withdrew in mid-season.
- Pogoń Zduńska Wola lost 2 points due to financial difficulties and was not admitted to play in the second half of the season. Eventually club stayed in IV liga because it took the place of Ekolog Wojsławice after the merge with it and forming Pogoń-Ekolog Zduńska Wola.
- Ekolog Wojsławice after the season was replaced by Pogoń-Ekolog Zduńska Wola, the successor of Pogoń Zduńska Wola.
- Bzura Ozorków withdrew after the season.
- LKS Gomunice withdrew after the season.
- Widzew II Łódź withdrew after the season.

== Season 2005–06 ==
New clubs:
- (P) promoted from Liga okręgowa: KKS Koluszki and Start Łódź ("Łódź" group), Stal Niewiadów and GKS II Bełchatów ("Piotrków Tryb." group), LKS Bałucz ("Sieradz" group) and Pelikan II Łowicz ("Skierniewice" group).
- Bzura Ozorków withdrew before the season and was replaced by Orzeł Parzęczew ("Łódź" group).

FINAL TABLE:

Pos	Club	M	P	W	D	L	GF	GA	GD
1	Concordia Piotrków Trybunalski	34	69	21	6	7	79	37	42
2	Włókniarz Konstantynów Łódzki	34	66	19	9	6	48	26	22
3	Omega Kleszczów	34	65	19	8	7	55	30	25
4	Woy Opoczno	34	61	17	10	7	59	32	27
5	Sokół Aleksandrów Łódzki	34	57	16	9	9	45	34	11
6	Pogoń-Ekolog Zduńska Wola	34	54	14	12	8	55	45	10
7	Warta Sieradz	34	53	15	8	11	45	34	11
8	LKS Bałucz (P)	34	50	13	11	10	54	34	20
9	Stal Niewiadów (P)	34	48	13	9	12	38	46	-8
10	Włókniarz-Trzy Korony Pabianice	34	45	13	6	15	38	38	0
11	GKS II Bełchatów (P)	34	43	12	7	15	44	56	-12
12	KKS Koluszki (P)	34	41	11	8	15	54	51	3
13	MKP Zgierz	34	39	8	15	11	40	45	-5
14	Orzeł Parzęczew (P)	34	38	10	8	16	34	48	-14
15	ŁKS II Łódź	34	36	10	6	18	41	62	-21
16	Pelikan II Łowicz (P)	34	30	8	6	20	31	65	-34
17	Warta Działoszyn	34	27	7	6	21	30	68	-38
18	Start Łódź (P)	34	21	5	6	23	34	73	-39

- Ekolog Wojsławice was replaced by Pogoń-Ekolog Zduńska Wola, the successor of Pogoń Zduńska Wola.

== Season 2006–07 ==
League expanded to 20 teams.

New clubs:

- (R) relegated from III liga "Łódź-Mazovia-Podlasie-Warmia/Masuria" group: Górnik Łęczyca and RKS Radomsko.
- (P) promoted from Liga okręgowa: Zjednoczeni Stryków ("Łódź" group), Pilica Przedbórz ("Piotrków Tryb." group), Gal-Gaz Galewice ("Sieradz" group) and Mazovia Rawa Mazowiecka ("Skierniewice" group).

FINAL TABLE:

Pos	Club	M	P	W	D	L	GF	GA	GD
1	Sokół Aleksandrów Łódzki	38	85	26	7	5	87	23	64
2	Warta Sieradz	38	79	24	7	7	76	30	46
3	Omega Kleszczów	38	73	21	10	7	51	21	30
4	Włókniarz Konstantynów Łódzki	38	69	19	12	7	72	37	35
5	GKS II Bełchatów	38	67	20	7	11	72	40	32
6	ŁKS II Łódź	38	65	18	11	9	69	50	19
7	Mazovia Rawa Mazowiecka (P)	38	59	18	5	15	71	53	18
8	Woy Opoczno	38	54	14	12	12	53	41	12
9	Stal Niewiadów	38	51	15	6	17	56	56	0
10	Pogoń-Ekolog Zduńska Wola	38	51	14	9	15	56	53	3
11	UKS SMS Bałucz	38	50	13	11	14	70	52	18
12	Zjednoczeni Stryków (P)	38	50	14	8	16	52	75	-23
13	KKS Koluszki	38	48	13	9	16	49	57	-8
14	Górnik Łęczyca (R)	38	44	12	8	18	63	74	-11
15	MKP Zgierz	38	43	12	7	19	38	57	-19
16	Orzeł Parzęczew	38	40	10	10	18	36	52	-16
17	Pilica Przedbórz (P)	38	38	9	11	18	40	69	-29
18	Gal-Gaz Galewice (P)	38	37	10	7	21	43	72	-29
19	Włókniarz-Trzy Korony Pabianice	38	26	7	5	26	30	114	-84
20	RKS Radomsko (R)	38	28	8	4	26	19	77	-58

- LKS Bałucz merged with UKS SMS Łódź to form UKS SMS Bałucz.
- RKS Radomsko withdrew in mid-season.
- GKS II Bełchatów withdrew after the season because the club was moved to Młoda Ekstraklasa (Youth League) in the next season.
- ŁKS II Łódź withdrew after the season because the club was moved to Młoda Ekstraklasa (Youth League) in the next season.

== Season 2007–08 ==
League reduced to 18 teams.

New clubs:

- (P) promoted from Liga okręgowa: MKS Kutno ("Łódź" group), Włókniarz Zelów ("Piotrków Tryb." group) and Pogoń Kolumna /Łask/ ("Sieradz" group).
- Unia II Skierniewice promoted from ("Skierniewice" group) was replaced by the first team Unia Skierniewice which withdrew in the previous season from III liga group 1.

FINAL TABLE:

Pos	Club	M	P	W	D	L	GF	GA	GD
1	Stal Niewiadów	34	83	27	2	5	82	30	52
2	Warta Sieradz	34	81	26	3	5	94	27	67
3	Omega Kleszczów	34	71	21	8	5	70	21	49
4	MKS Kutno (P)	34	63	19	6	9	99	58	41
5	Woy Opoczno	34	61	18	7	9	70	46	24
6	Włókniarz Konstantynów Łódzki	34	57	16	9	9	62	40	22
7	Zjednoczeni Stryków	34	52	14	10	10	53	43	10
8	Pilica Przedbórz	34	47	12	11	11	50	63	-13
9	Włókniarz Zelów (P)	34	47	14	5	15	46	45	1
10	Pogoń-Ekolog Zduńska Wola	34	47	13	8	13	53	45	8
11	Vis 2007 Skierniewice (R)	34	45	12	9	13	69	70	-1
12	Orzeł Parzęczew	34	43	11	10	13	45	55	-10
13	MKP Zgierz	34	40	12	4	18	41	79	-38
14	UKS SMS Bałucz	34	35	10	5	19	40	49	-9
15	Pogoń Kolumna /Łask/ (P)	34	28	8	4	22	34	85	-51
16	Górnik Łęczyca	34	27	8	3	23	39	81	-42
17	Mazovia Rawa Mazowiecka	34	20	4	8	22	20	66	-46
18	KKS Koluszki	34	13	3	4	27	29	93	-64

- Unia (II) Skierniewice changed name into Vis 2007 Skierniewice.
- Stal Niewiadów lost play-off to play in II liga (new 3rd level of Polish football league system).
- Teams from places 1-6 were promoted to new created III liga but in fact stayed on 4th level.
- Teams from places 7-15 stayed in IV liga but in fact they were moved to the 5th level.
- Teams from places 16-18 were relegated to Liga okręgowa (6th level).
- UKS SMS Bałucz was replaced by reserve (II) team of UKS SMS Łódź after the season.

== Season 2008–09 ==
IV liga became the 5th level of Polish football league system due to the formation of Ekstraklasa as the top level league in Poland.

New clubs:

- (P) promoted from Liga okręgowa: Kolejarz Łódź and Zawisza Rzgów ("Łódź" group), Ceramika Opoczno and KS Paradyż ("Piotrków Tryb." group), Czarni Rząśnia, Gal-Gaz Galewice and Zawisza Pajęczno ("Sieradz" group), Astra Zduny and Pelikan II Łowicz ("Skierniewice" group).
- UKS SMS II Łódź replaced UKS SMS Bałucz before the season.

FINAL TABLE:

Pos	Club	M	P	W	D	L	GF	GA	GD
1	Włókniarz Zelów	34	70	21	7	6	95	36	59
2	Pogoń-Ekolog Zduńska Wola	34	70	21	7	6	79	41	38
3	KS Paradyż (P)	34	67	20	7	7	83	37	46
4	Ceramika Opoczno (P)	34	64	19	7	8	59	41	18
5	Gal-Gaz Galewice (P)	34	62	19	5	10	70	52	18
6	Zawisza Rzgów (P)	34	62	19	5	10	90	48	42
7	Zjednoczeni Stryków	34	53	15	8	11	60	44	16
8	Pelikan II Łowicz (P)	34	49	14	7	13	60	60	0
9	Vis 2007 Skierniewice	34	48	15	3	16	69	75	-6
10	Czarni Rząśnia (P)	34	47	14	5	15	46	58	-12
11	Pogoń Kolumna /Łask/	34	44	13	5	16	49	70	-21
12	Pilica Przedbórz	34	43	11	10	13	40	39	1
13	Kolejarz Łódź (P)	34	42	13	3	18	50	77	-27
14	Zawisza Pajęczno (P)	34	40	11	7	16	42	50	-8
15	UKS SMS II Łódź (P)	34	39	11	6	17	44	48	-4
16	Boruta Zgierz	34	30	7	9	18	34	53	-19
17	Orzeł Parzęczew	34	29	8	5	21	33	76	-43
18	Astra Zduny (P)	34	6	2	0	32	16	114	-98

- MKP Zgierz changed name into Boruta Zgierz.
- KS Paradyż lost play-off to play in III liga.
- Gal-Gaz Galewice withdrew after the season.

== Season 2009–10 ==
League expanded to 20 teams.

New clubs:

- (R) relegated from III liga "Łódź-Mazovia" group: Włókniarz Konstantynów Łódzki and Woy Bukowiec Opoczyński.
- (P) promoted from Liga okręgowa: Widzew II Łódź ("Łódź" group), Włókniarz Moszczenica ("Piotrków Tryb." group), WKS Wieluń ("Sieradz" group) and Mazovia Rawa Mazowiecka ("Skierniewice" group).
- ŁKS II Łódź was restored to IV liga after losing the place in Młoda Ekstraklasa (Youth League) which joined after 2006/2007 season.

FINAL TABLE:

Pos	Club	M	P	W	D	L	GF	GA	GD
1	Pilica Przedbórz	38	78	24	6	8	66	37	29
2	Ceramika Opoczno	38	73	21	10	7	82	40	42
3	Unia Skierniewice	38	72	23	3	12	85	40	45
4	Włókniarz Konstantynów Łódzki (R)	38	71	22	5	11	89	62	27
5	Zjednoczeni Stryków	38	69	20	9	9	72	40	32
6	Zawisza Pajęczno	38	68	20	8	10	61	49	12
7	Widzew II Łódź (P)	38	65	19	8	11	83	43	40
8	KS Paradyż	38	63	17	12	9	72	46	26
9	ŁKS II Łódź (P)	38	61	18	7	13	67	58	9
10	UKS SMS II Łódź	38	60	18	6	14	66	54	12
11	Woy Bukowiec Opoczyński (R)	38	58	16	10	12	59	59	0
12	Zawisza Rzgów	38	58	17	7	14	63	54	9
13	WKS Wieluń (P)	38	53	16	5	17	62	60	2
14	Boruta Zgierz	38	49	15	4	19	53	56	-3
15	Czarni Rząśnia	38	44	12	8	18	57	77	-20
16	AZS WSEZ/Kolejarz Łódź	38	43	13	4	21	63	88	-25
17	Włókniarz Moszczenica (P)	38	30	8	6	24	48	86	-38
18	Mazovia Rawa Mazowiecka (P)	38	29	9	2	27	37	94	-57
19	Pelikan II Łowicz	38	16	4	4	30	28	99	-71
20	Pogoń Kolumna /Łask/	38	15	3	6	29	22	93	-71

- Kolejarz Łódź changed name into AZS WSEZ/Kolejarz Łódź.
- Vis 2007 Skierniewice changed name into Unia Skierniewice.
- Pogoń Kolumna /Łask/ withdrew in mid-season.

== Season 2010–11 ==
League reduced to 18 teams.

New clubs:

- (R) relegated from III liga "Łódź-Mazovia" group: Omega Kleszczów and Pogoń-Ekolog Zduńska Wola.
- (P) promoted from Liga okręgowa: Włókniarz Zgierz ("Łódź" group), Lechia Tomaszów Mazowiecki ("Piotrków Tryb." group), Warta Działoszyn ("Sieradz" group) and Orlęta Cielądz ("Skierniewice" group).

FINAL TABLE:

Pos	Club	M	P	W	D	L	GF	GA	GD
1	Omega Kleszczów (R)	34	81	25	6	3	84	27	57
2	Zawisza Rzgów	34	73	23	4	7	63	23	40
3	Woy Bukowiec Opoczyński	34	68	20	8	6	63	28	35
4	Lechia Tomaszów Mazowiecki (P)	34	62	19	5	10	55	29	26
5	Włókniarz Zgierz (P)	34	56	16	8	10	49	42	7
6	KS Paradyż	34	53	16	5	13	62	38	24
7	Warta Działoszyn (P)	34	52	14	10	10	48	42	6
8	Zawisza Pajęczno	34	52	15	7	12	56	49	7
9	Pogoń-Ekolog Zduńska Wola (R)	34	52	14	10	10	57	37	20
10	Zjednoczeni Stryków	34	47	15	2	17	44	55	-11
11	Widzew II Łódź	34	45	13	6	15	55	52	3
12	WKS Wieluń	34	43	12	7	15	41	51	-10
13	Boruta Zgierz	34	42	12	6	16	43	54	-11
14	Włókniarz Konstantynów Łódzki	34	41	11	8	15	50	63	-13
15	Orlęta Cielądz (P)	34	38	11	5	18	43	79	-36
16	Unia Skierniewice	34	24	6	6	22	28	58	-30
17	ŁKS II Łódź	34	24	7	3	24	35	78	-43
18	UKS SMS II Łódź	34	11	3	2	29	13	84	-71

- UKS SMS II Łódź withdrew in mid-season.
- Widzew II Łódź withdrew after the season.

== Season 2011–12 ==
New clubs:
- (R) relegated from III liga "Łódź-Mazovia" group: Concordia Piotrków Trybunalski, Pilica Przedbórz and UKS SMS Łódź.
- (P) promoted from Liga okręgowa: Włókniarz Pabianice ("Łódź" group), Włókniarz Moszczenica ("Piotrków Tryb." group), LKS Kwiatkowice ("Sieradz" group) and Sorento Zadębie /Skierniewice/ ("Skierniewice" group).

FINAL TABLE:

Pos	Club	M	P	W	D	L	GF	GA	GD
1	Lechia Tomaszów Mazowiecki	34	78	24	6	4	67	15	52
2	WKS Wieluń	34	71	21	8	5	68	31	37
3	KS Paradyż	34	70	20	10	4	60	29	31
4	Warta Działoszyn	34	62	18	8	8	49	31	18
5	Woy Bukowiec Opoczyński	34	57	17	6	11	73	44	29
6	Pilica Przedbórz (R)	34	51	14	9	11	57	37	20
7	Zjednoczeni Stryków	34	49	13	10	11	46	47	-1
8	LKS Kwiatkowice (P)	34	48	13	9	12	53	39	14
9	Zawisza Pajęczno	34	48	14	6	14	57	54	3
10	Concordia Piotrków Trybunalski (R)	34	48	14	6	14	47	38	9
11	Sorento Zadębie /Skierniewice/ (P)	34	46	11	13	10	43	41	2
12	UKS SMS Łódź (R)	34	45	11	12	11	47	44	3
13	Włókniarz Moszczenica (P)	34	44	13	5	16	46	59	-13
14	Boruta Zgierz	34	37	9	10	15	36	50	-14
15	Włókniarz Pabianice (P)	34	36	9	9	16	44	71	-27
16	Włókniarz Zgierz	34	34	8	10	16	38	54	-16
17	Pogoń-Ekolog Zduńska Wola	34	20	5	5	24	19	72	-53
18	Włókniarz Konstantynów Łódzki	34	3	1	0	33	10	104	-94

- Włókniarz Konstantynów Łódzki withdrew in mid-season.
- UKS SMS Łódź withdrew after the season.
- Woy Bukowiec Opoczyński withdrew after the season.

== Season 2012–13 ==
New clubs:
- (P) promoted from Liga okręgowa: Górnik Łęczyca ("Łódź" group), Mechanik Radomsko ("Piotrków Tryb." group), Jutrzenka Warta ("Sieradz" group), Mazovia Rawa Mazowiecka and Orlęta Cielądz ("Skierniewice" group).

FINAL TABLE:

Pos	Club	M	P	W	D	L	GF	GA	GD
1	KS Paradyż	34	77	23	8	3	92	32	60
2	LKS Kwiatkowice	34	72	23	3	8	76	37	39
3	Mechanik Radomsko (P)	34	71	21	8	5	76	30	46
4	Warta Działoszyn	34	70	21	7	6	77	40	37
5	Zjednoczeni Stryków	34	62	20	2	12	68	37	31
6	Mazovia Rawa Mazowiecka (P)	34	55	16	7	11	53	42	11
7	Pilica Przedbórz	34	53	15	8	11	56	45	11
8	Concordia Piotrków Trybunalski	34	52	15	7	12	60	42	18
9	Zawisza Pajęczno	34	52	16	4	14	61	54	7
10	Włókniarz Moszczenica	34	44	11	11	12	57	57	0
11	Jutrzenka Warta (P)	34	42	12	6	16	54	62	-8
12	Boruta Zgierz	34	39	11	6	17	52	67	-15
13	Włókniarz Pabianice	34	37	11	4	19	52	78	-26
14	Pogoń Zduńska Wola	34	37	10	7	17	48	69	-21
15	Górnik Łęczyca (P)	34	33	10	3	21	46	84	-38
16	Orlęta Cielądz (P)	34	23	5	8	21	39	92	-53
17	Włókniarz Zgierz	34	20	5	5	24	46	100	-54
18	Sorento Zadębie /Skierniewice/	34	26	8	2	24	27	72	-45

- Pogoń-Ekolog Zduńska Wola changed name into Pogoń Zduńska Wola.
- KS Paradyż refused to play in III liga.
- LKS Kwiatkowice refused to play III liga. Eventually the club withdrew also from playing in IV liga after the season.
- Sorento Zadębie /Skierniewice/ withdrew in mid-season.
- Włókniarz Pabianice withdrew after the season.

== Season 2013–14 ==
League expanded to 20 teams.

New clubs:

- (R) relegated from I liga: ŁKS Łódź (the club did not get license to play in III liga).
- (R) relegated from III liga "Łódź-Mazovia" group: Włókniarz Zelów.
- (P) promoted from Liga okręgowa: Ner Poddębice and Start Brzeziny ("Łódź" group), Astoria Szczerców and LKS Mierzyn ("Piotrków Tryb." group), Czarni Rząśnia ("Sieradz" group), MKS Skierniewice and Orzeł Nieborów ("Skierniewice" group).

FINAL TABLE:

Pos	Club	M	P	W	D	L	GF	GA	GD
1	ŁKS Łódź (R)	38	95	30	5	3	116	19	97
2	KS Paradyż	38	81	24	9	5	82	38	44
3	Zjednoczeni Stryków	38	68	21	5	12	73	47	26
4	Włókniarz Moszczenica	38	66	19	9	10	75	58	17
5	Widok Skierniewice (P)	38	64	18	10	10	66	52	14
6	Ner Poddębice (P)	38	63	18	9	11	62	36	26
7	Orzeł Nieborów (P)	38	59	17	8	13	74	59	15
8	Warta Działoszyn	38	56	16	8	14	71	58	13
9	Włókniarz Zelów (R)	38	56	16	8	14	56	60	-4
10	Zawisza Pajęczno	38	56	15	11	12	59	48	11
11	Pilica Przedbórz	38	52	12	16	10	47	41	6
12	Astoria Szczerców (P)	38	50	13	11	14	44	53	-9
13	Boruta Zgierz	38	48	14	6	18	66	77	-11
14	Mazovia Rawa Mazowiecka	38	47	13	8	17	46	63	-17
15	Concordia Piotrków Trybunalski	38	47	14	5	19	60	82	-22
16	Czarni Rząśnia (P)	38	42	10	12	16	42	68	-26
17	Pogoń Zduńska Wola	38	40	12	4	22	51	61	-10
18	Jutrzenka Warta	38	39	10	9	19	60	68	-8
19	Start Brzeziny (P)	38	21	6	3	29	39	101	-62
20	LKS Mierzyn (P)	38	9	1	6	31	24	124	-100

- MKS Skierniewice changed name into Widok Skierniewice.
- KS Paradyż and Zjednoczeni Stryków did not get the licence to play in III liga.

== Season 2014–15 ==
League reduced to 18 teams.

New clubs:

- (R) relegated from III liga "Łódź-Mazovia" group: GKS II Bełchatów, Mechanik Radomsko and Zawisza Rzgów.
- (P) promoted from Liga okręgowa: LKS Rosanów ("Łódź" group), Polonia Piotrków Trybunalski ("Piotrków Tryb." group) and Piast Błaszki ("Sieradz" group). No team was promoted from "Skierniewice" group.

FINAL TABLE:

Pos	Club	M	P	W	D	L	GF	GA	GD
1	Warta Działoszyn	34	78	24	6	4	69	22	47
2	Ner Poddębice	34	77	24	5	5	66	27	39
3	GKS II Bełchatów (R)	34	72	23	3	8	90	34	56
4	Pilica Przedbórz	34	65	20	5	9	61	38	23
5	Polonia Piotrków Trybunalski (P)	34	65	19	8	7	53	32	21
6	KS Paradyż	34	59	19	2	13	69	42	27
7	Zjednoczeni Stryków	34	52	16	4	14	64	50	14
8	Boruta Zgierz	34	50	14	8	12	64	51	13
9	Mechanik Radomsko (R)	34	49	15	4	15	66	61	5
10	Zawisza Pajęczno	34	48	14	6	14	60	61	-1
11	Zawisza Rzgów (R)	34	46	14	4	16	57	72	-15
12	LKS Rosanów (P)	34	43	13	4	17	48	62	-14
13	Włókniarz Zelów	34	40	12	4	18	48	75	-27
14	Astoria Szczerców	34	35	9	8	17	46	67	-21
15	Orzeł Nieborów	34	34	9	7	18	43	58	-15
16	Włókniarz Moszczenica	34	27	6	9	19	37	63	-26
17	Widok Skierniewice	34	19	5	4	25	40	102	-62
18	Piast Błaszki (P)	34	12	3	3	28	39	103	-64

- GKS II Bełchatów refused to play in play-off.
- Pilica Przedbórz lost play-off to play in III liga.

== Season 2015–16 ==
League expanded to 20 teams.

New clubs:

- (R) demoted from I liga: Widzew Łódź (the club did not get license to play in II liga and III liga).
- (R) relegated from III liga "Łódź-Mazovia" group: Omega Kleszczów.
- (P) promoted from Liga okręgowa: Andrespolia Wiśniowa Góra and Stal Głowno ("Łódź" group), Zjednoczeni Bełchatów ("Piotrków Tryb." group), Jutrzenka Warta ("Sieradz" group) and Mazovia Rawa Mazowiecka ("Skierniewice" group).

FINAL TABLE:

Pos	Club	M	P	W	D	L	GF	GA	GD
1	Widzew Łódź (R)	38	88	27	7	4	86	16	70
2	KS Paradyż	38	83	26	5	7	90	38	52
3	GKS II Bełchatów	38	75	22	9	7	84	36	48
4	Zjednoczeni Bełchatów (P)	38	73	22	7	9	76	43	33
5	Jutrzenka Warta (P)	38	58	16	10	12	56	49	7
6	Omega Kleszczów (R)	38	57	16	9	13	69	55	14
7	Pilica Przedbórz	38	57	17	6	15	69	66	3
8	Zawisza Rzgów	38	56	15	11	12	66	62	4
9	Zjednoczeni Stryków	38	56	15	11	12	44	48	-4
10	Polonia Piotrków Trybunalski	38	55	15	10	13	67	60	7
11	Mechanik Radomsko	38	53	14	11	13	52	55	-3
12	Zawisza Pajęczno	38	52	15	7	16	47	54	-7
13	Andrespolia Wiśniowa Góra (P)	38	47	13	8	17	53	66	-13
14	Włókniarz Zelów	38	46	13	7	18	57	67	-10
15	Boruta Zgierz	38	45	12	9	17	55	58	-3
16	Astoria Szczerców	38	37	11	4	23	43	73	-30
17	LKS Rosanów	38	36	10	6	22	43	82	-39
18	Orzeł Nieborów	38	32	8	8	22	44	83	-39
19	Stal Głowno (P)	38	29	7	8	23	57	105	-48
20	Mazovia Rawa Mazowiecka (P)	38	27	8	3	27	53	95	-42

== Season 2016–17 ==
New clubs:
- (R) relegated from III liga "Łódź-Mazovia" group: Ner Poddębice, Warta Działoszyn and Warta Sieradz.
- (P) promoted from Liga okręgowa: KS Kutno ("Łódź" group), Ceramika Opoczno ("Piotrków Tryb." group), LKS Kwiatkowice ("Sieradz" group) and Unia Skierniewice ("Skierniewice" group).

FINAL TABLE:

Pos	Club	M	P	W	D	L	GF	GA	GD
1	Warta Sieradz (R)	38	86	26	8	4	85	28	57
2	Warta Działoszyn (R)	38	72	22	6	10	69	41	28
3	Omega Kleszczów	38	67	20	7	11	78	61	17
4	Unia Skierniewice (P)	38	65	18	11	9	84	41	43
5	Zjednoczeni Bełchatów	38	64	18	10	10	67	50	17
6	Ner Poddębice (R)	38	61	17	10	11	78	57	21
7	GKS II Bełchatów	38	61	16	13	9	83	58	25
8	KS Kutno (P)	38	60	17	9	12	65	61	4
9	LKS Kwiatkowice (P)	38	57	18	3	17	66	72	-6
10	Pilica Przedbórz	38	57	18	3	17	73	77	-4
11	Zjednoczeni Stryków	38	57	15	12	11	66	61	5
12	Zawisza Pajęczno	38	56	17	5	16	73	74	-1
13	KS Paradyż	38	52	15	7	16	54	55	-1
14	Ceramika Opoczno (P)	38	49	12	13	13	48	45	3
15	Włókniarz Zelów	38	45	11	12	15	43	58	-15
16	Zawisza Rzgów	38	42	11	9	18	50	69	-19
17	Jutrzenka Warta	38	37	10	7	21	59	93	-34
18	Andrespolia Wiśniowa Góra	38	29	7	8	23	52	78	-26
19	Mechanik Radomsko	38	26	7	5	26	43	85	-42
20	Polonia Piotrków Trybunalski	38	14	2	8	28	33	105	-72

== Season 2017–18 ==
League reduced to 18 teams.

New clubs:

- (P) promoted from Liga okręgowa: Boruta Zgierz ("Łódź" group), Stal Niewiadów ("Piotrków Tryb." group), Orkan Buczek ("Sieradz" group) and Pelikan II Łowicz ("Skierniewice" group).

FINAL TABLE:

Pos	Club	M	P	W	D	L	GF	GA	GD
1	Unia Skierniewice	34	93	30	3	1	111	11	100
2	Warta Działoszyn	34	74	23	5	6	76	37	39
3	Ner Poddębice	34	72	22	6	6	86	42	44
4	LKS Kwiatkowice	34	65	19	8	7	83	37	46
5	Zjednoczeni Stryków	34	57	17	6	11	66	38	28
6	Omega Kleszczów	34	55	16	7	11	67	55	12
7	Włókniarz Zelów	34	53	17	2	15	65	63	2
8	KS Paradyż	34	52	16	4	14	66	47	19
9	Stal Niewiadów (P)	34	52	15	7	12	60	46	14
10	KS Kutno	34	45	13	6	15	84	55	29
11	Pelikan II Łowicz (P)	34	45	13	6	15	55	54	1
12	Orkan Buczek (P)	34	43	12	7	15	66	58	8
13	Ceramika Opoczno	34	42	12	6	16	42	55	-13
14	Boruta Zgierz (P)	34	41	11	8	15	68	74	-6
15	GKS II Bełchatów	34	34	10	4	20	61	84	-23
16	Pilica Przedbórz	34	31	8	7	19	56	84	-28
17	Zawisza Pajęczno	34	17	5	2	27	27	114	-87
18	Zjednoczeni Bełchatów	34	0	0	0	34	4	189	-185

- Zjednoczeni Bełchatów withdrew after 20th round (after losing 0-30 with KS Kutno).
- KS Paradyż withdrew after the season.
- GKS II Bełchatów withdrew after the season.
- Zawisza Pajęczno withdrew after the season.

== Season 2018–19 ==
League reduced to 17 teams.

New clubs:

- (R) relegated from III liga group 1: Warta Sieradz.
- (P) promoted from Liga okręgowa: Andrespolia Wiśniowa Góra ("Łódź" group), RKS Radomsko ("Piotrków Tryb." group) and Pogoń Zduńska Wola ("Sieradz" group). No team was promoted from "Skierniewice" group.

FINAL TABLE:

Pos	Club	M	P	W	D	L	GF	GA	GD
1	RKS Radomsko (P)	32	82	26	4	2	81	17	64
2	Warta Sieradz (R)	32	78	24	6	2	82	28	54
3	KS Kutno	32	65	20	5	7	72	39	33
4	Orkan Buczek	32	52	14	10	8	62	37	25
5	Omega Kleszczów	32	52	15	7	10	57	47	10
6	Zjednoczeni Stryków	32	50	15	5	12	44	36	8
7	LKS Kwiatkowice	32	48	13	9	10	47	45	2
8	Włókniarz Zelów	32	48	14	6	12	47	47	0
9	Ceramika Opoczno	32	47	14	5	13	36	44	-8
10	Ner Poddębice	32	40	11	7	14	53	62	-9
11	Warta Działoszyn	32	37	9	10	13	71	74	-3
12	Andrespolia Wiśniowa Góra (P)	32	36	9	9	14	54	55	-1
13	Pogoń Zduńska Wola (P)	32	36	10	6	16	45	54	-9
14	Boruta Zgierz	32	28	6	10	16	39	57	-18
15	Pelikan II Łowicz	32	21	6	3	23	41	109	-68
16	Stal Niewiadów	32	18	2	12	18	31	67	-36
17	Pilica Przedbórz	32	17	3	8	21	52	96	-44

== Season 2019–20 ==
League expanded to 18 teams.

New clubs:

- (P) promoted from Liga okręgowa: ŁKS II Łódź ("Łódź" group), Polonia Piotrków Trybunalski ("Piotrków Tryb." group), Jutrzenka Warta ("Sieradz" group) and Orzeł Nieborów ("Skierniewice" group).

Final table (due to COVID-19 pandemic league was ended after 17th round):

Pos	Club	M	P	W	D	L	GF	GA	GD
1	KS Kutno	17	43	14	1	2	48	17	31
2	Warta Sieradz	17	37	11	4	2	52	18	34
3	Polonia Piotrków Trybunalski (P)	17	37	12	1	4	50	20	30
4	Orkan Buczek	17	35	11	2	4	47	22	25
5	ŁKS II Łódź (P)	17	29	7	8	2	49	31	18
6	Pogoń Zduńska Wola	17	27	8	3	6	31	34	-3
7	LKS Kwiatkowice	17	26	8	2	7	38	27	11
8	Warta Działoszyn	17	24	7	3	7	31	37	-6
9	Omega Kleszczów	17	24	7	3	7	39	36	3
10	Włókniarz Zelów	17	24	7	3	7	31	32	-1
11	Boruta Zgierz	17	23	6	5	6	39	35	4
12	Jutrzenka Warta (P)	17	22	6	4	7	28	28	0
13	Zjednoczeni Stryków	17	20	4	8	5	30	32	-2
14	Andrespolia Wiśniowa Góra	17	18	4	6	7	29	38	-9
15	Ceramika Opoczno	17	15	4	3	10	24	41	-17
16	Ner Poddębice	17	10	2	4	11	17	40	-23
17	Pelikan II Łowicz	17	8	2	2	13	14	63	-49
18	Orzeł Nieborów (P)	17	6	2	0	15	20	66	-46

- Pelikan II Łowicz withdrew after the season.

== Season 2020–21 ==
League expanded to 20 teams.

New clubs:

- (P) promoted from Liga okręgowa: Stal Głowno ("Łódź" group), Skalnik Sulejów ("Piotrków Tryb." group), Czarni Rząśnia ("Sieradz" group) and Jutrzenka Drzewce ("Skierniewice" group).

FINAL TABLE:
TBA

== All-time table ==
The table that follows is accurate as of the end of the 2019/20 season. It includes the clubs that played at least one match (even annulled) in IV liga Łódź group since 2000/01 season.

Blue colour means that the club plays in IV liga in the current 2020/21 season.
Green colour means that the club plays higher than IV liga in the current 2020/21 season.

Dark grey colour means that the club does not play in any league in the current 2020/21 season.

Pos	Club	S	M	P	W	D	L	GF	GA	GD	county seat	seasons
1	KS (Ceramika) Paradyż	14	494	953	286	95	113	1052	526	526	Opoczno	01-04, 09-18
2	Warta Działoszyn	15	501	774	226	96	179	831	772	59	Pajęczno	01-06, 11–15, 17-
3	Zjednoczeni Stryków	14	477	742	214	100	163	782	653	129	Zgierz	07-
4	Boruta (MKP) Zgierz	17	577	678	183	129	265	788	960	-172	Zgierz	01, 04–16, 18-
5	Omega Kleszczów	11	367	645	188	81	98	669	441	228	Bełchatów	04-08, 11, 16-
6	Pogoń (-Ekolog) Zduńska Wola	14	467	630	179	95	193	739	755	-16	Zduńska Wola	01-03, 05–09, 11–14, 19-
7	Pilica Przedbórz	12	426	589	163	100	163	667	692	-25	Radomsko	07-10, 12-19
8	Woy (/Ceramika II) Bukowiec Opoczyński	11	384	586	168	82	134	619	519	100	Opoczno	01-08, 10-12
9	Włókniarz Konstantynów Łódzki	10	348	565	164	73	111	570	455	115	Pabianice	02-08, 10-12
10	GKS II Bełchatów	10	354	549	161	66	127	643	510	133	Bełchatów	01-04, 06–07, 15-18
11	Warta Sieradz	9	297	529	158	55	84	611	383	228	Sieradz	01-02, 05–08, 17, 19-
12	Zawisza Pajęczno	10	356	489	142	63	151	543	607	-64	Pajęczno	09-18
13	Włókniarz Zelów	9	299	429	125	54	120	488	483	5	Bełchatów	08-09, 14-
14	Widzew II Łódź	7	244	376	109	49	86	462	364	98	Łódź	01-05, 10-11
15	WKS Wieluń	7	242	357	103	48	91	368	329	39	Wieluń	02-05, 10-12
16	ŁKS II Łódź	8	263	357	101	54	108	404	416	-12	Łódź	03-07, 10–11, 20-
17	Górnik Łęczyca	8	278	357	107	36	135	374	473	-99	Łęczyca	01-05, 07–08, 13
18	Sokół Aleksandrów Łódzki	6	208	348	100	48	60	349	227	122	Zgierz	02-07
19	Unia (Vis 2007) Skierniewice	6	212	347	104	35	73	446	295	151	Skierniewice	08-11, 17-18
20	Zawisza Rzgów	6	216	337	99	40	77	389	328	61	Łódź	09-11, 15-17
21	Mazovia (/Białka) Rawa Mazowiecka	9	324	326	92	50	182	411	682	-271	Rawa Maz.	01, 03–04, 07–08, 10, 13–14, 16
22	Ner Poddębice	6	193	323	94	41	58	362	264	98	Poddębice	14-15, 17-
23	KS (MKS) Kutno	6	191	317	95	32	64	412	303	109	Kutno	01, 08, 17-20
24	LKS Kwiatkowice	6	189	316	94	34	61	363	257	106	Łask	12-13, 17-
25	RKS (Mechanik) Radomsko	6	214	309	91	36	87	337	325	12	Radomsko	07, 13, 15–17, 19
26	Ceramika Opoczno	6	193	290	82	44	67	291	266	25	Opoczno	09-10, 17-
27	Concordia Piotrków Trybunalski	5	174	281	83	32	59	318	231	87	Piotrków Tryb.	05-06, 12-14
28	Włókniarz (-Trzy Korony) Pabianice	7	244	281	78	47	119	322	469	-147	Pabianice	01-02, 05–07, 12-13
29	Bzura Ozorków	5	172	259	76	31	65	252	197	55	Zgierz	01-05
30	Stal Niewiadów	5	172	252	72	36	64	267	245	22	Tomaszów Maz.	06-08, 18-19
31	Jutrzenka Warta	6	201	237	66	39	96	308	376	-68	Sieradz	01, 13–14, 16–17, 20-
32	LKS (Stasiak) Gomunice	4	138	223	68	19	51	232	164	68	Radomsko	01, 03-05
33	Włókniarz Moszczenica	5	178	211	57	40	81	263	323	-60	Piotrków Tryb.	10, 12-15
34	Stal Głowno	3	108	173	52	17	39	215	179	36	Zgierz	01-02, 16, 21-
35	Polonia Piotrków Trybunalski	4	127	171	48	27	52	203	217	-14	Piotrków Tryb.	15-17, 20-
36	Pelikan II Łowicz	6	189	169	47	28	114	229	450	-221	Łowicz	06, 09–10, 18-20
37	Ekolog Wojsławice	3	102	157	46	19	37	133	121	12	Zduńska Wola	03-05
38	Start Brzeziny	4	142	156	43	27	72	163	240	-77	Brzeziny	01-03, 14
39	Orzeł Parzęczew	4	140	150	39	33	68	148	231	-83	Zgierz	06-09
40	Start Łódź	4	138	149	41	26	71	195	251	-56	Łódź	01-03, 06
41	Lechia Tomaszów Mazowiecki	2	68	140	43	11	14	122	44	78	Tomaszów Maz.	11-12
42	Zjednoczeni Bełchatów	3	110	137	40	17	53	147	282	-135	Bełchatów	16-18
43	LKS (UKS SMS) Bałucz	3	106	135	36	27	43	164	135	29	Łask	06-08
44	Czarni Rząśnia	3	110	133	36	25	49	145	203	-58	Pajęczno	09-10, 14, 21-
45	Orzeł Nieborów	4	127	131	36	23	68	181	266	-85	Łowicz	14-16, 20-
46	Orkan Buczek	3	83	130	37	19	27	175	117	58	Łask	18-
47	Andrespolia Wiśniowa Góra	4	125	130	33	31	61	188	237	-49	Łódź	16-17, 19-
48	Astoria Szczerców	3	110	122	33	23	54	133	193	-60	Bełchatów	14-16
49	Włókniarz Zgierz	3	102	110	29	23	50	133	196	-63	Zgierz	11-13
50	UKS SMS II Łódź	3	106	110	32	14	60	123	186	-63	Łódź	09-11
51	KKS Koluszki	3	106	102	27	21	58	132	201	-69	Łódź	06-08
52	Gal-Gaz Galewice	2	72	99	29	12	31	113	124	-11	Wieruszów	07, 09
53	ŁKS Łódź	1	38	95	30	5	3	116	19	97	Łódź	14
54	Widzew Łódź	1	38	88	27	7	4	86	16	70	Łódź	16
55	Pogoń Kolumna /Łask/	3	106	87	24	15	67	105	248	-143	Łask	08-10
56	Widok Skierniewice	3	106	87	24	15	67	129	296	-167	Skierniewice	02, 14-15
57	Kolejarz (/AZS WSEZ) Łódź	2	72	85	26	7	39	113	165	-52	Łódź	09-10
58	LKS Rosanów	2	72	79	23	10	39	91	144	-53	Zgierz	15-16
59	RKS II Radomsko	2	68	73	20	13	35	84	126	-42	Radomsko	03-04
60	Sorento Zadębie /Skierniewice/	2	68	72	19	15	34	70	113	-43	Skierniewice	12-13
61	Victoria Szadek	2	68	69	18	15	35	74	124	-50	Zduńska Wola	02, 04
62	Orlęta Cielądz	2	68	61	16	13	39	82	171	-89	Rawa Maz.	11, 13
63	UKS SMS Łódź	1	34	45	11	12	11	47	44	3	Łódź	12
64	Pogoń Rogów	1	36	25	6	7	23	53	94	-41	Brzeziny	01
65	Unia II Skierniewice	1	34	22	6	4	24	27	84	-57	Skierniewice	05
66	Piast Błaszki	1	34	12	3	3	28	39	103	-64	Sieradz	15
67	LKS Mierzyn	1	38	9	1	6	31	24	124	-100	Piotrków Tryb.	14
68	Astra Zduny	1	34	6	2	0	32	16	114	-98	Łowicz	09
69	Huragan Bobrowniki	1	0	0	0	0	0	0	0	0	Łowicz	01
	Jutrzenka Drzewce										Skierniewice	21-
	Skalnik Sulejów										Piotrków Tryb.	21-

- Table includes 3 two-sided walkovers in 2004/05 season.
- Pogoń Zduńska Wola lost 2 points due to financial difficulties in 2004/05 season.
- Huragan Bobrowniki withdrew after playing 19 matches in 2000/01 season. Its results were cancelled.

== Locations of the clubs ==
Locations of all clubs playing in IV liga Łódź group:
