= 2012–13 Lechia Gdańsk season =

Lechia Gdańsk
2012–13 season
- Manager: Bogusław Kaczmarek
- Stadium: Stadion Energa Gdańsk
- Ekstraklasa: 8th
- Polish Cup: Round of 16
- Top goalscorer: League: Abdou Traoré (9 goals); All: Abdou Traoré (10 goals)
- Highest home attendance: 19,415 vs Śląsk Wrocław
- Lowest home attendance: 8,000 vs Korona Kielce
Home colours	Away colours

The 2012–13 Ekstraklasa season was Lechia's 69th since their creation, and was their 5th continuous season in the top league of Polish football.

The season covers the period from 1 July 2012 to 30 June 2013.

== Players ==
=== First team squad ===
Note: Flags indicate national team as defined under FIFA eligibility rules; some limited exceptions apply. Players may hold more than one non-FIFA nationality.

No.	Pos.	Nation	Player
1	GK	POL	Michał Buchalik
2	DF	POL	Rafał Janicki
3	DF	LTU	Vytautas Andriuškevičius
4	DF	POL	Piotr Brożek
5	DF	POL	Krzysztof Bąk
6	DF	POL	Jarosław Bieniuk
7	MF	BFA	Abdou Traoré
8	MF	POL	Łukasz Surma
9	FW	POL	Piotr Grzelczak
10	MF	POL	Przemysław Frankowski
11	FW	POL	Grzegorz Rasiak
12	GK	POL	Bartosz Kaniecki
13	DF	POL	Sebastian Madera
14	MF	POL	Piotr Wiśniewski
15	FW	POL	Adam Duda
16	MF	ESP	Andreu Guerao

No.	Pos.	Nation	Player
17	MF	POL	Marcin Pietrowski
18	FW	POL	Kacper Łazaj
19	FW	BRA	Ricardinho
20	DF	ARM	Levon Hayrapetyan
20	FW	POL	Paweł Buzała
21	MF	POL	Mateusz Machaj
22	MF	POL	Paweł Nowak
25	MF	POL	Wojciech Zyska
26	DF	BRA	Deleu
27	DF	POL	Paweł Dawidowicz
28	DF	COD	Christopher Oualembo
29	MF	POL	Łukasz Kacprzycki
30	MF	POL	Maciej Kostrzewa
31	FW	POL	Damian Kugiel
33	GK	POL	Sebastian Małkowski
46	MF	ALG	Mohammed Rahoui

=== Transfers ===
==== Players In ====
No.	Pos.	Player	From	Type	Window	Fee	Date	Source
13	DF	Sebastian Madera	Widzew Łódź	Transfer	Summer	£90k	1 July 2012	-
11	FW	Grzegorz Rasiak	Jagiellonia Białystok	Transfer	Summer	Free	1 July 2012	
16	MF	Andreu Guerao	Dinamo Tbilisi	Transfer	Summer	Free	1 July 2012	
6	DF	Jarosław Bieniuk	Widzew Łódź	Transfer	Summer	Free	9 July 2012	
19	FW	Ricardinho	Wisła Płock	Transfer	Summer	Free	19 July 2012	
4	DF	Piotr Brożek	Trabzonspor	Transfer	Summer	Free	9 August 2012	
25	MF	Wojciech Zyska	Olimpia Sztum	Transfer	Summer	£9k	17 August 2012	-
27	MF	Mateusz Gorka	Rodło Kwidzyn	Loan	Summer	Free	17 August 2012	-
28	DF	Christopher Oualembo	Chernomorets Burgas	Transfer	Summer	Free	15 October 2012	-
20	FW	Paweł Buzała	GKS Bełchatów	Transfer	Winter	Free	12 January 2013	-
46	FW	Mohammed Rahoui	Olympique Noisy-le-Sec	Transfer	Winter	Free	29 January 2013	
20	FW	Julian Ripoli	Genoa U19	Transfer	Winter	Free	21 March 2013	
		12 players				£99k		

==== Out ====
No.	Pos.	Player	To	Type	Window	Fee	Date	Source
10	FW	Tomasz Dawidowski	Retired	-	-	-	1 July 2012	-
24	GK	Wojciech Pawłowski	Udinese	Transfer	Summer	£450k	1 July 2012	
46	FW	Josip Tadić	Melbourne Heart	Transfer	Summer	Free	1 July 2012	
4	DF	Sergejs Kožans	Shakhtyor Soligorsk	Transfer	Summer	Free	1 July 2012	
6	DF	Luka Vučko	Pécsi MFC	Transfer	Summer	Free	1 July 2012	
16	MF	Jakub Popielarz	Jakub Popielarz	Loan	Summer	Free	31 July 2012	
6	MF	Damian Szuprytowski	Concordia Elbląg	Transfer	Summer	Free	4 August 2012	-
25	MF	Kamil Poźniak	ŁKS Łódź	Transfer	Summer	Free	10 August 2012	-
11	FW	Ivans Lukjanovs	FMetalurh Zaporizhya	Transfer	Summer	Free	18 August 2012	-
22	MF	Paweł Nowak	Sandecja Nowy Sącz	Transfer	Summer	Free	14 January 2013	
7	FW	Abdou Traoré	Gaziantepspor	Transfer	Winter	Free	15 January 2013	
8	FW	Patryk Tuszyński	Sandecja Nowy Sącz	Loan	Summer	Free	25 January 2013	-
16	MF	Andreu Guerao	Racing de Santander	Transfer	Winter	Free	31 January 2013	
9	FW	Piotr Grzelczak	Polonia Warsaw	Loan	Winter	Free	28 February 2013	
3	DF	Vytautas Andriuškevičius	Djurgårdens IF	Transfer	Winter	Free	2 April 2013	
23	MF	Marko Bajić	Al-Madina SC	Transfer	Winter	Free	15 April 2013	-
		16 players				£450k		

== League ==
=== Fixtures for the 2012–13 Ekstraklasa season ===
2 August 2012 1	Lechia Gdańsk	1–3	Polonia Warsaw	Gdańsk
17:30 BST	Piotr Wiśniewski 12'		Daniel Gołębiewski 4'; Paweł Wszołek 18'; Jacek Kiełb 90'	Stadium: Stadion Energa Gdańsk; Attendance: 15,945

27 August 2012 2	Pogoń Szczecin	0–2	Lechia Gdańsk	Szczecin
17:30 BST			Abdou Traoré 57'; Łukasz Surma 90+1'	Stadium: Stadion Florian Krygier; Attendance: 12,237

1 September 2012 3	Korona Kielce	0–1	Lechia Gdańsk	Kielce
12:30 BST			Ricardinho 10'	Stadium: Suzuki Arena; Attendance: 6607

15 September 2012 4	Lechia Gdańsk	1–2	Piast Gliwice	Gdańsk
14:45 BST	Abdou Traoré 24'		Rubén Jurado 56'; Tomasz Podgórski 86'	Stadium: Stadion Energa Gdańsk; Attendance: 14,420

22 September 2012 5	Wisła Kraków	1–0	Lechia Gdańsk	Kraków
17:00 BST	Tsvetan Genkov 17'			Stadium: Stadion Miejski; Attendance: 16,935

30 September 2012 6	Lechia Gdańsk	2–0	Lech Poznań	Gdańsk
16:00 GMT	Piotr Wiśniewski 33'; Abdou Traoré 90'			Stadium: Stadion Energa Gdańsk; Attendance: 17,300

8 October 2012 7	Jagiellonia Białystok	0–2	Lechia Gdańsk	Białystok
17:30 BST			Mateusz Machaj 12'; Ricardinho 85'	Stadium: Białystok City Stadium; Attendance: 3,013

21 October 2012 8	Lechia Gdańsk	2–3	Śląsk Wrocław	Gdańsk
13:30 GMT	Abdou Traoré 45' (pen.), 50'		Sebastian Mila 62' (71); Rok Elsner 72'	Stadium: Stadion Energa Gdańsk; Attendance: 19,415

26 October 2012 9	Podbeskidzie Bielsko-Biała	2–3	Lechia Gdańsk	Bielsko-Biała
17:00 BST	Liran Cohen 60'; Fabian Pawela 87'		Grzegorz Rasiak 7'; Ricardinho 82'; Abdou Traoré 90+5' (pen.)	Stadium: Stadion Miejski; Attendance: 3,000

4 November 2012 10	Lechia Gdańsk	1–2	Legia Warsaw	Gdańsk
19:30 BST	Abdou Traoré 69'		Miroslav Radović 36'; Danijel Ljuboja 73'	Stadium: Stadion Energa Gdańsk; Attendance: 17,956

9 November 2012 11	Ruch Chorzów	0–1	Lechia Gdańsk	Chorzów
17:00 BST			Kacper Łazaj 88'	Stadium: Stadion Miejski; Attendance: 3,600

16 November 2012 12	Lechia Gdańsk	2–0	Widzew Łódź	Gdańsk
19:45 GMT	Abdou Traoré 45+3' (pen.); Ricardinho 74'			Stadium: Stadion Energa Gdańsk; Attendance: 10,264

24 November 2012 13	GKS Bełchatów	0–0	Lechia Gdańsk	Bełchatów
12:30 BST	Łukasz Madej 47'		Ricardinho 58' (pen.)	Stadium: Stadion GKS; Attendance: 1,800

2 December 2012 14	Lechia Gdańsk	2–2	Zagłębie Lubin	Gdańsk
13:30 BST	Abdou Traoré 26' (pen.); Deleu 51'		Szymon Pawłowski 23'; Costa Nhamoinesu 83'	Stadium: Stadion Energa Gdańsk; Attendance: 12,021

8 December 2012 15	Górnik Zabrze	2–0	Lechia Gdańsk	Zabrze
17:00 BST	Mateusz Zachara 15'; Wojciech Łuczak 45+1'			Stadium: Ernest Pohl Stadium; Attendance: 3,000

22 February 2013 16	Polonia Warsaw	1–1	Lechia Gdańsk	Warsaw
19:45 GMT	Miłosz Przybecki 88'		Piotr Wiśniewski 83'	Stadium: Konwiktorska Street Municipal Stadium; Attendance: 2,800

1 March 2013 17	Lechia Gdańsk	1–1	Pogoń Szczecin	Gdańsk
17:00 GMT	Piotr Brożek 17' (pen.)		Andradina 90+5' (pen.)	Stadium: Stadion Energa Gdańsk; Attendance: 12,060

11 March 2013 18	Lechia Gdańsk	3–2	Korona Kielce	Gdańsk
17:30 GMT	Paweł Buzała 8'; Marcin Pietrowski 74'; Adam Duda 80'		Michał Janota 54'; Pavol Staňo 90+1'	Stadium: Stadion Energa Gdańsk; Attendance: 8,000

18 March 2013 19	Piast Gliwice	2–0	Lechia Gdańsk	Gliwice
17:30 GMT	Tomasz Podgórski 74'; Marcin Robak 88'			Stadium: Stadion Piast; Attendance: 4,051

1 April 2013 20	Lechia Gdańsk	0–0	Wisła Kraków	Gdańsk
15:00 GMT				Stadium: Stadion Energa Gdańsk; Attendance: 13,937

5 April 2013 21	Lech Poznań	4–2	Lechia Gdańsk	Poznań
19:45 GMT	Marcin Kamiński 4'; Hubert Wołąkiewicz 27'; Gergő Lovrencsics 33'; Bartosz Ślusarski 90+1'		Piotr Wiśniewski 71'; Adam Duda 90+3'	Stadium: Stadion Miejski; Attendance: 17,141

14 April 2013 22	Lechia Gdańsk	2–3	Jagiellonia Białystok	Gdańsk
16:00 GMT	Adam Duda 19'; Ricardinho 49'		Dani Quintana 27'; Maciej Gajos 55'; Ebi Smolarek 73'	Stadium: Stadion Energa Gdańsk; Attendance: 12,798

21 April 2013 23	Śląsk Wrocław	1–1	Lechia Gdańsk	Wrocław
13:30 GMT	Piotr Ćwielong 88'		Piotr Wiśniewski 51'	Stadium: Stadion Miejski; Attendance: 17,832

27 April 2013 24	Lechia Gdańsk	1–2	Podbeskidzie Bielsko-Biała	Gdańsk
14:45 GMT	Przemysław Frankowski 77'		Tomasz Górkiewicz 63'; Damian Chmiel 74'	Stadium: Stadion Energa Gdańsk; Attendance: 9,954

5 May 2013 25	Legia Warsaw	1–0	Lechia Gdańsk	Warsaw
13:30 GMT	Jakub Kosecki 53'			Stadium: Polish Army Stadium; Attendance: 15,735

12 May 2013 26	Lechia Gdańsk	4–4	Ruch Chorzów	Gdańsk
16:00 GMT	Piotr Wiśniewski 6'; Ricardinho 23'; Grzegorz Rasiak 90+2'; Adam Duda 90+4'		Łukasz Janoszka 7'; Pavel Šultes 58', 63'; Marek Zieńczuk 79'	Stadium: Stadion Energa Gdańsk; Attendance: 11,342

20 May 2013 27	Widzew Łódź	1–2	Lechia Gdańsk	Łódź
17:30 GMT	Łukasz Broź 35' (pen.)		Adam Duda 67'; Mateusz Machaj 76'	Stadium: Stadion Miejski; Attendance: 4,500

25 May 2013 28	Lechia Gdańsk	1–1	GKS Bełchatów	Gdańsk
12:30 GMT	Grzegorz Rasiak 88'		Bartłomiej Bartosiak 24'	Stadium: Stadion Energa Gdańsk; Attendance: 9,836

30 May 2013 29	Zagłębie Lubin	0–3	Lechia Gdańsk	Lubin
17:00 GMT			Adam Banaś 9 (OG)'; Paweł Buzała 17'; Grzegorz Rasiak 28'	Stadium: Stadion Zagłębia Lubin; Attendance: 4,935

2 June 2013 30	Lechia Gdańsk	0–2	Górnik Zabrze	Gdańsk
15:00 GMT			Sergei Mošnikov 37'; Grzegorz Bonin 89'	Stadium: Stadion Energa Gdańsk; Attendance: 13,041

=== League table ===
Pos	Team	Pld	W	D	L	GF	GA	GD	Pts	Qualification or relegation
6	Polonia Warsaw (Note: Polonia Warszawa did not receive the license for the 2013–14 season due to financial problems. As a result, the 15th-placed Ruch Chorzów stayed in Ekstraklasa for the next season.) (D, R)	30	11	9	10	45	34	+11	42	Club dissolved after season
7	Wisła Kraków	30	10	8	12	28	35	−7	38 (Note: WIS 1–0 LGD; LGD 0–0 WIS)	
8	Lechia Gdańsk	30	10	8	12	42	43	−1	38	
9	Zagłębie Lubin (Note: Zagłębie Lubin was docked 3 points due to bribery scandal in 2005–06 season.)	30	11	7	12	38	37	+1	37 (Note: JAG 0–0 ZLU; ZLU 2–1 JAG)	
10	Jagiellonia Białystok	30	8	13	9	31	45	−14	37	

Source: 90minut.pl (in Polish)
Rules for classification: 1) points; 2) head-to-head points; 3) head-to-head goal difference; 4) head-to-head goals scored; 5) goal difference; 6) number of goals scored; 7) Fair Play table. Head-to-head record is used only after all the matches between the teams in question have been played
(D) Disqualified; (R) Relegated

== Polish Cup ==
11 August 2012 Round of 32	GKS Bogdanka	1–2 (a.e.t.)	Lechia Gdańsk	Łęczna
16:00 GMT	Maciej Ropiejko 29'		Sebastian Madera 55'; Piotr Wiśniewski 98'	Stadium: Stadion Górnika Łęczna

3 October 2012 Round of 16	Jagiellonia Białystok	2–2 (a.e.t.) (5–4 p)	Lechia Gdańsk	Białystok
18:30 GMT	Ebi Smolarek 20'; Tomasz Kupisz 32'		Tomasz Kupisz 30 (OG)'; Abdou Traoré 75'	Stadium: Białystok City Stadium; Attendance: 2,437

== Stats ==
			League		Cup		Total	
No.	Pos.	Player	Apps	Goals	Apps	Goals	Apps	Goals
1	GK	Michał Buchalik	25	0	1	0	26	0
2	DF	Rafał Janicki	24	0	1	0	25	0
3	DF	Vytautas Andriuškevičius	2	0	0	0	2	0
4	DF	Piotr Brożek	24	1	0	0	24	1
5	DF	Krzysztof Bąk	17	0	1	0	18	0
6	DF	Jarosław Bieniuk	29	0	2	0	31	0
7	MF	Abdou Traoré	13	9	2	1	15	10
8	MF	Łukasz Surma	28	1	2	0	30	1
9	FW	Piotr Grzelczak	6	0	0	0	6	0
10	MF	Przemysław Frankowski	8	1	0	0	8	1
11	FW	Grzegorz Rasiak	13	4	2	0	15	4
12	GK	Bartosz Kaniecki	6	0	1	0	7	0
13	DF	Sebastian Madera	10	0	2	1	12	1
14	MF	Piotr Wiśniewski	24	6	2	1	26	7
15	FW	Adam Duda	17	5	0	0	17	5
16	MF	Andreu Guerao	8	0	2	0	10	0
17	MF	Marcin Pietrowski	24	1	2	0	26	1
18	FW	Kacper Łazaj	11	1	0	0	11	1
19	FW	Ricardinho	27	7	1	0	28	7
20	DF	Levon Hayrapetyan	3	0	1	0	4	0
20	FW	Paweł Buzała	14	2	0	0	14	2
21	MF	Mateusz Machaj	25	2	2	0	27	2
22	MF	Paweł Nowak	3	0	1	0	4	0
25	MF	Wojciech Zyska	4	0	0	0	4	0
26	DF	Deleu	20	1	1	0	21	1
27	DF	Paweł Dawidowicz	2	0	0	0	2	0
28	DF	Christopher Oualembo	7	0	0	0	7	0
29	FW	Łukasz Kacprzycki	12	0	1	0	13	0
30	MF	Maciej Kostrzewa	1	0	0	0	1	0
31	FW	Damian Kugiel	3	0	0	0	3	0
33	GK	Sebastian Małkowski	1	0	1	0	2	0
46	MF	Mohammed Rahoui	3	0	0	0	3	0

=== Goalscorers ===
Rank	Player	Goals
1	Abdou Traoré	10
2	Ricardinho	7
2	Piotr Wiśniewski	6
4	Adam Duda	5
5	Grzegorz Rasiak	4
6	Paweł Buzała	2
6	Mateusz Machaj	2
8	Piotr Brożek	1
8	Łukasz Surma	1
8	Przemysław Frankowski	1
8	Sebastian Madera	1
8	Marcin Pietrowski	1
8	Kacper Łazaj	1
8	Deleu	1
