= 2011–12 Lechia Gdańsk season =

Lechia Gdańsk
2011–12 season
- Manager: Bogusław Kaczmarek
- Stadium: Stadion Energa Gdańsk
- Ekstraklasa: 13th
- Polish Cup: Round of 16
- Top goalscorer: League: Abdou Traoré (4 goals); All: Abdou Traoré (4 goals)
- Highest home attendance: 34,444 vs Cracovia
- Lowest home attendance: 10,525 vs Podbeskidzie
Home colours	Away colours	Third colours

The 2011–12 Ekstraklasa season was Lechia's 68th since their creation, and was their 4th continuous season in the top league of Polish football.

The season covers the period from 1 July 2011 to 30 June 2012.

== Players ==
=== First team squad ===
Note: Flags indicate national team as defined under FIFA eligibility rules; some limited exceptions apply. Players may hold more than one non-FIFA nationality.

No.	Pos.	Nation	Player
1	GK	POL	Michał Buchalik
2	DF	POL	Rafał Janicki
3	DF	LTU	Vytautas Andriuškevičius
4	DF	LVA	Sergejs Kožans
5	DF	POL	Krzysztof Bąk
6	DF	CRO	Luka Vučko
7	MF	BFA	Abdou Traoré
8	MF	POL	Łukasz Surma
9	FW	BLR	Alyaksandr Sazankow
9	FW	POL	Piotr Grzelczak
10	MF	POL	Przemysław Frankowski
11	FW	LVA	Ivans Lukjanovs
12	GK	POL	Bartosz Kaniecki
13	DF	POL	Sebastian Madera
14	MF	POL	Piotr Wiśniewski
15	FW	POL	Patryk Tuszyński

No.	Pos.	Nation	Player
15	FW	POL	Adam Duda
16	MF	POL	Jakub Popielarz
16	MF	POL	Jakub Kosecki
17	MF	POL	Marcin Pietrowski
19	MF	POL	Jakub Wilk
19	FW	GHA	Fred Benson
20	DF	ARM	Levon Hayrapetyan
21	MF	POL	Mateusz Machaj
22	MF	POL	Paweł Nowak
23	MF	SRB	Marko Bajić
24	GK	POL	Wojciech Pawłowski
25	MF	POL	Kamil Poźniak
26	DF	BRA	Deleu
32	MF	POL	Mateusz Łuczak
33	GK	POL	Sebastian Małkowski
46	FW	CRO	Josip Tadić

=== Transfers ===
==== Players in ====
No.	Pos.	Player	From	Type	Window	Fee	Date	Source
21	MF	Mateusz Machaj	Lech Poznań	Transfer	Summer	£45k	1 July 2011	
19	FW	Fred Benson	RKC Waalwijk	Transfer	Summer	Free	1 July 2011	
1	GK	Michał Buchalik	Odra Wodzisław	Transfer	Summer	Free	1 July 2011	
46	FW	Josip Tadić	AC Omonia	Transfer	Summer	Free	31 August 2011	
19	MF	Jakub Wilk	Lech Poznań	Loan	Winter	£50k	1 January 2012	
15	FW	Patryk Tuszyński	MKS Kluczbork	Transfer	Winter	$45k	13 January 2012	
9	FW	Piotr Grzelczak	Widzew Łódź	Transfer	Winter	£63k	1 February 2012	
12	GK	Bartosz Kaniecki	Widzew Łódź	Transfer	Winter	£41k	1 February 2012	
13	DF	Sebastian Madera	Widzew Łódź	Loan	Winter	Free	1 February 2012	-
16	MF	Jakub Kosecki	Legia Warsaw	Loan	Winter	Free	28 February 2012	-
		10 players				£244k		

==== Out ====
No.	Pos.	Player	To	Type	Window	Fee	Date	Source
-	MF	Piotr Kasperkiewicz	Arka Gdynia	Transfer	Summer	Free	1 July 2011	
35	FW	Jakub Zejglic	Bytovia Bytów	Transfer	Summer	Free	1 August 2011	-
18	FW	Bédi Buval	Feirense	Transfer	Summer	Free	16 September 2011	-
-	FW	Mateusz Łuczak	Korona Kielce	Transfer	Winter	Free	1 January 2012	-
1	GK	Pawel Kapsa	Alki Larnaca FC	Transfer	Winter	Free	1 January 2012	-
19	FW	Fred Benson	No club	Released	Winter	-	1 January 2012	
-	MF	Jakub Kawa	Bałtyk Gdynia	Loan	Winter	Free	1 February 2012	-
-	FW	Michał Pruchnik	Stal Mielec	Loan	Winter	Free	1 February 2012	-
12	GK	Bartosz Kaniecki	Bałtyk Gdynia	Loan	Winter	Free	1 March 2012	-
-	MF	Mariusz Korzępa	Siarka Tarnobrzeg	Loan	Winter	Free	10 March 2012	-
		10 players				£0k		

== League ==
=== Fixtures for the 2011–12 Ekstraklasa season ===
29 July 2011 1	Polonia Warsaw	1–0	Lechia Gdańsk	Warsaw
19:30 BST	Bruno Coutinho 79'			Stadium: Konwiktorska Street Municipal Stadium; Attendance: 3,500

6 August 2011 2	Jagiellonia Białystok	2–1	Lechia Gdańsk	Białystok
14:45 BST	Andrius Skerla 39'; Tomasz Frankowski 89'		Ivans Lukjanovs 7'	Stadium: Białystok City Stadium; Attendance: 3,691

14 August 2011 3	Lechia Gdańsk	1–1	Cracovia	Gdańsk
16:00 BST	Fred Benson 25'		Aleksejs Višņakovs 69'	Stadium: Stadion Energa Gdańsk; Attendance: 34,444

22 August 2011 4	Lechia Gdańsk	0–0	ŁKS Łódź	Gdańsk
17:30 BST				Stadium: Stadion Energa Gdańsk; Attendance: 22,264

22 September 2011 5	Wisła Kraków	0–1	Lechia Gdańsk	Kraków
17:00 BST			Piotr Wiśniewski 54'	Stadium: Stadion Miejski; Attendance: 13,550

12 September 2011 6	Lechia Gdańsk	2–1	Górnik Zabrze	Gdańsk
17:30 GMT	Mateusz Machaj 60'; Piotr Wiśniewski 82' (pen.)		Daniel Gołębiewski 31'	Stadium: Stadion Energa Gdańsk; Attendance: 18,566

17 September 2011 7	Korona Kielce	1–0	Lechia Gdańsk	Kielce
17:00 BST	Jacek Kiełb 9'			Stadium: Suzuki Arena; Attendance: 9,183

23 September 2011 8	Podbeskidzie Bielsko-Biała	1–0	Lechia Gdańsk	Bielsko-Biała
17:00 GMT	Piotr Malinowski 70'			Stadium: Stadion Miejski; Attendance: 3,000

30 September 2011 9	Lechia Gdańsk	0–0	GKS Bełchatów	Gdańsk
19:30 BST				Stadium: Stadion Energa Gdańsk; Attendance: 17,313

16 October 2011 10	Zagłębie Lubin	0–1	Lechia Gdańsk	Lubin
13:30 BST			Marcin Pietrowski 45'	Stadium: Stadion Zagłębia Lubin; Attendance: 5,946

22 October 2011 11	Lechia Gdańsk	0–0	Lech Poznań	Gdańsk
17:00 BST				Stadium: Stadion Energa Gdańsk; Attendance: 24,997

28 October 2011 12	Śląsk Wrocław	1–0	Lechia Gdańsk	Wrocław
19:30 GMT	Johan Voskamp 51'			Stadium: Stadion Miejski; Attendance: 40,000

5 November 2011 13	Lechia Gdańsk	0–0	Widzew Łódź	Gdańsk
17:00 BST				Stadium: Stadion Energa Gdańsk; Attendance: 14,261

19 November 2011 14	Legia Warsaw	3–0	Lechia Gdańsk	Warsaw
17:00 BST	Ivica Vrdoljak 45'; Rafał Wolski 55'; Miroslav Radović 84'			Stadium: Polish Army Stadium; Attendance: 19,846

8 December 2011 15	Lechia Gdańsk	1–0	Ruch Chorzów	Gdańsk
17:00 BST	Piotr Stawarczyk 15 (OG)'			Stadium: Stadion Energa Gdańsk; Attendance: 12,351

2 December 2011 16	Lechia Gdańsk	1–3	Polonia Warsaw	Gdańsk
19:30 GMT	Abdou Razack Traoré 37'		Edgar Çani 9', 14', 43'	Stadium: Stadion Energa Gdańsk; Attendance: 11,342

11 December 2011 17	Lechia Gdańsk	0–1	Jagiellonia Białystok	Gdańsk
16:00 GMT			Grzegorz Rasiak 85'	Stadium: Stadion Energa Gdańsk; Attendance: 12,754

18 February 2012 18	Cracovia	1–1	Lechia Gdańsk	Kraków
14:45 GMT	Koen van der Biezen 88'		Piotr Wiśniewski 48'	Stadium: Marshal Józef Piłsudski Stadium; Attendance: 7,542

24 February 2012 19	ŁKS Łódź	0–0	Lechia Gdańsk	Łódź
17:00 GMT				Stadium: Stadion ŁKS; Attendance: 2,720

3 March 2012 20	Lechia Gdańsk	0–2	Wisła Kraków	Gdańsk
17:00 GMT			Kew Jaliens 8'; Dudu Biton 39'	Stadium: Stadion Energa Gdańsk; Attendance: 19,704

10 March 2012 21	Górnik Zabrze	2–2	Lechia Gdańsk	Zabrze
12:30 GMT	Oleksandr Shevelyukhin 46'; Préjuce Nakoulma 77'		Łukasz Surma 8'; Abdou Razack Traoré 43'	Stadium: Ernest Pohl Stadium; Attendance: 3,000

19 March 2012 22	Lechia Gdańsk	0–0	Korona Kielce	Gdańsk
17:30 GMT				Stadium: Stadion Energa Gdańsk; Attendance: 10,565

24 March 2012 23	Lechia Gdańsk	2–3	Podbeskidzie Bielsko-Biała	Gdańsk
14:45 GMT	Jakub Kosecki 18', 37'		Róbert Demjan 9', 67'; Sylwester Patejuk 39' (pen.)	Stadium: Stadion Energa Gdańsk; Attendance: 10,525

30 March 2012 24	GKS Bełchatów	1–3	Lechia Gdańsk	Gdańsk
17:00 GMT	Marcin Żewłakow 61'		Abdou Razack Traoré 41'; Sebastian Madera 48'; Piotr Grzelczak 75'	Stadium: Stadion Energa Gdańsk; Attendance: 1,800

9 April 2012 25	Lechia Gdańsk	0–1	Zagłębie Lubin	Gdańsk
15:00 GMT			Maciej Małkowski 12'	Stadium: Stadion Energa Gdańsk; Attendance: 14,985

15 April 2012 26	Lech Poznań	2–1	Lechia Gdańsk	Poznań
13:30 GMT	Vojo Ubiparip 43'; Mateusz Możdżeń 86'		Dimitrije Injac 64 (OG)'	Stadium: Stadion Miejski; Attendance: 19,737

22 April 2012 27	Lechia Gdańsk	1–1	Śląsk Wrocław	Gdańsk
16:00 GMT	Jakub Wilk 84'		Mariusz Pawelec 64'	Stadium: Stadion Energa Gdańsk; Attendance: 14,792

28 April 2012 28	Widzew Łódź	0–1	Lechia Gdańsk	Łódź
12:30 GMT			Abdou Razack Traoré 14'	Stadium: Stadion Miejski; Attendance: 5,100

3 May 2012 29	Lechia Gdańsk	1–0	Legia Warsaw	Gdańsk
17:00 GMT	Jakub Wilk 43'			Stadium: Stadion Energa Gdańsk; Attendance: 21,359

6 May 2012 30	Ruch Chorzów	2–1	Lechia Gdańsk	Chorzów
16:00 GMT	Arkadiusz Piech 18'; Gábor Straka 21'		Sebastian Madera 85'	Stadium: Stadion Miejski; Attendance: 7,600

=== League table ===
Pos	Team	Pld	W	D	L	GF	GA	GD	Pts	Qualification or relegation
11	Widzew Łódź	30	9	12	9	25	26	−1	39 (Note: WID 3–1 JAG; JAG 4–1 WID)	
12	Podbeskidzie Bielsko-Biała	30	9	8	13	26	39	−13	35	
13	Lechia Gdańsk	30	7	10	13	21	30	−9	31 (Note: LGD 0–0 GKS; GKS 1–3 LGD)	
14	GKS Bełchatów	30	7	10	13	34	36	−2	31	
15	ŁKS Łódź (R)	30	5	9	16	23	53	−30	24	Relegation to I liga

Source: 90minut.pl (in Polish)
Rules for classification: 1) points; 2) head-to-head points; 3) head-to-head goal difference; 4) head-to-head goals scored; 5) goal difference; 6) number of goals scored; 7) Fair Play table. Head-to-head record is used only after all the matches between the teams in question have been played
(R) Relegated

== Polish Cup ==
20 September 2011 Round 2	Limanovia Limanowa	1–0	Lechia Gdańsk	Limanowa
16:00 GMT	Paweł Kępa 19'			Stadium: Roman Szumilas Stadium; Attendance: 1,800

== Stats ==
			League		Cup		Total	
No.	Pos.	Player	Apps	Goals	Apps	Goals	Apps	Goals
1	GK	Michał Buchalik	1	0	-		1	0
2	DF	Rafał Janicki	25	0	-		25	0
3	DF	Vytautas Andriuškevičius	13	0	1	0	14	0
4	DF	Sergejs Kožans	14	0	1	0	15	0
5	DF	Krzysztof Bąk	15	0	1	0	16	0
6	DF	Luka Vučko	18	0	1	0	19	0
7	MF	Abdou Razack Traoré	24	4	-		24	4
8	MF	Łukasz Surma	25	1	1	0	26	1
9	FW	Piotr Grzelczak	10	1	-		10	1
9	FW	Alyaksandr Sazankow	1	0	-		1	0
10	FW	Tomasz Dawidowski	18	0	1	0	19	0
11	FW	Ivans Lukjanovs	19	1	-		19	1
13	DF	Sebastian Madera	7	2	-		7	2
14	FW	Piotr Wiśniewski	21	3	-		21	3
15	FW	Patryk Tuszyński	2	0	-		2	0
15	FW	Adam Duda	5	0	-		5	0
16	MF	Jakub Popielarz	1	0	1	0	2	0
16	MF	Jakub Kosecki	8	2	-		8	2
17	MF	Marcin Pietrowski	23	1	1	0	24	1
19	MF	Jakub Wilk	12	2	-		12	2
19	FW	Fred Benson	11	1	1	0	12	1
20	DF	Levon Hayrapetyan	25	0	-		25	0
21	MF	Mateusz Machaj	16	1	1	-	17	1
22	MF	Paweł Nowak	21	0	-		21	0
23	MF	Marko Bajić	12	0	-		12	0
24	GK	Wojciech Pawłowski	16	0	1	0	17	0
25	MF	Kamil Poźniak	4	0	1	0	5	0
26	DF	Deleu	20	0	1	0	21	0
32	MF	Mateusz Łuczak	3	0	-		3	0
33	GK	Sebastian Małkowski	14	0	-		14	0
46	FW	Josip Tadić	11	0	1	0	12	0

=== Goalscorers ===
Rank	Player	Goals
1	Abdou Razack Traoré	4
2	Piotr Wiśniewski	3
3	Sebastian Madera	2
3	Jakub Kosecki	2
3	Jakub Wilk	2
3	Own goals	2
7	Piotr Grzelczak	1
7	Fred Benson	1
7	Mateusz Machaj	1
7	Ivans Lukjanovs	1
7	Marcin Pietrowski	1
7	Łukasz Surma	1
