= 2010–11 Lechia Gdańsk season =

Lechia Gdańsk
2010–11 season
- Manager: Tomasz Kafarski
- Stadium: MOSiR Stadium
- Ekstraklasa: 8th
- Polish Cup: Semi-finals
- Top goalscorer: League: Abdou Traoré (12 goals); All: Abdou Traoré (13 goals)
Home colours	Away colours

The 2010–11 Ekstraklasa season was Lechia Gdańsk's 67th since their creation, and was their 3rd continuous season in the top league of Polish football. On 7 August 2010 the club celebrated its 65th anniversary.

The season covers the period from 1 July 2010 to 30 June 2011.

== Players ==
=== First team squad ===
Note: Flags indicate national team as defined under FIFA eligibility rules; some limited exceptions apply. Players may hold more than one non-FIFA nationality.

No.	Pos.	Nation	Player
1	GK	(Poland) POL	Paweł Kapsa
2	DF	(Poland) POL	Rafał Janicki
3	DF	(Lithuania) LTU	Vytautas Andriuškevičius
4	DF	(Latvia) LVA	Sergejs Kožans
5	DF	(Poland) POL	Krzysztof Bąk
6	MF	(Poland) POL	Damian Szuprytowski
6	DF	(Croatia) CRO	Luka Vučko
7	MF	(Burkina Faso) BFA	Abdou Traoré
8	MF	(Poland) POL	Łukasz Surma
9	FW	(Belarus) BLR	Alyaksandr Sazankow
10	FW	(Poland) POL	Tomasz Dawidowski
11	FW	(Latvia) LVA	Ivans Lukjanovs
14	MF	(Poland) POL	Piotr Wiśniewski
15	FW	(Poland) POL	Jakub Zejglic

No.	Pos.	Nation	Player
16	MF	(Poland) POL	Jakub Popielarz
17	MF	(Poland) POL	Marcin Pietrowski
19	FW	(France) FRA	Bédi Buval
20	FW	(Poland) POL	Paweł Buzała
20	DF	(Armenia) ARM	Levon Hayrapetyan
21	DF	(Poland) POL	Hubert Wołąkiewicz
22	MF	(Poland) POL	Paweł Nowak
23	MF	(Serbia) SRB	Marko Bajić
24	GK	(Poland) POL	Mateusz Bąk
25	MF	(Poland) POL	Marek Zieńczuk
25	MF	(Poland) POL	Kamil Poźniak
26	DF	(Brazil) BRA	Deleu
29	MF	(Poland) POL	Marcin Kaczmarek
33	GK	(Poland) POL	Sebastian Małkowski

=== Transfers ===
==== Players In ====
No.	Pos.	Player	From	Type	Window	Fee	Date
2	DF	Rafał Janicki	Chemik Police	Transfer	Summer	€25k	1 July 2010
3	DF	Vytautas Andriuškevičius	FBK Kaunas	Transfer	Summer	€150k	1 July 2010
26	DF	Deleu	Clube Atlético Metropolitano	Transfer	Summer	Free	13 July 2010
25	MF	Marek Zieńczuk	Xanthi	Transfer	Summer	Free	1 August 2010
7	FW	Abdou Traoré	Rosenborg	Loan	Summer	€50k	1 August 2010
9	FW	Alyaksandr Sazankow	Dinamo Minsk	Transfer	Summer	€150k	1 August 2010
19	FW	Bédi Buval	Panionios	Transfer	Summer	Free	1 August 2010
7	FW	Abdou Traoré	Rosenborg	Transfer	Winter	Free	1 January 2010
20	DF	Levon Hayrapetyan	Pyunik	Transfer	Winter	Free	1 January 2011
25	MF	Kamil Pozniak	GKS Bełchatów	Transfer	Winter	€215k	1 February 2011
6	DF	Luka Vučko	Eskişehirspor	Transfer	Winter	Free	1 February 2011
		10 players				£590k	

==== Out ====
No.	Pos.	Player	To	Type	Window	Fee	Date
6	MF	Karol Piątek	Bruk-Bet Termalica Nieciecza	Transfer	Summer	Free	1 July 2010
19	DF	Peter Čvirik	Universitatea Cluj	Transfer	Summer	Free	1 July 2010
28	FW	Maciej Kowalczyk	Sandecja Nowy Sącz	Transfer	Summer	Free	1 July 2010
-	DF	Maciej Osłowski	Dolcan Ząbki	Transfer	Summer	Free	1 July 2010
-	MF	Jakub Kawa	Bałtyk Gdynia	Loan	Summer	Free	1 July 2010
9	MF	Maciej Rogalski	Podbeskidzie	Transfer	Summer	€25k	9 July 2010
30	DF	Rafał Kosznik	Warta Poznań	Transfer	Summer	Free	1 August 2010
-	MF	Piotr Kasperkiewicz	Olimpia Grudziądz	Loan	Summer	Free	1 August 2010
3	MF	Arkadiusz Mysona	Polonia Bytom	Loan	Summer	Free	24 August 2010
20	FW	Hubert Wołąkiewicz	Lech Poznań	Transfer	Winter	€125k	1 January 2011
29	MF	Marcin Kaczmarek	ŁKS Łódź	Transfer	Winter	€40k	1 January 2011
20	FW	Paweł Buzała	GKS Bełchatów	Transfer	Winter	€140k	1 February 2011
24	GK	Mateusz Bąk	Wisła Płock	Transfer	Winter	Free	1 February 2011
-	MF	Piotr Kasperkiewicz	Tur Turek	Loan	Winter	Free	1 February 2010
		13 players				€290k	

== League ==
=== League table ===
Pos	Team	Pld	W	D	L	GF	GA	GD	Pts
6	Górnik Zabrze	30	13	6	11	36	40	−4	45 (Note: GÓR 2–0 LPO; LPO 2–0 GÓR)
7	Polonia Warsaw	30	12	8	10	41	26	+15	44
8	Lechia Gdańsk	30	12	7	11	37	36	+1	43 (Note: LGD 3–1 WID; WID 1–0 LGD)
9	Widzew Łódź	30	11	10	9	41	34	+7	43
10	GKS Bełchatów	30	10	10	10	31	33	−2	40

Source: 90minut.pl (in Polish)
Rules for classification: 1) points; 2) head-to-head points; 3) head-to-head goal difference; 4) head-to-head goals scored; 5) goal difference; 6) number of goals scored.

== Stats ==
			League		Cup		Total	
No.	Pos.	Player	Apps	Goals	Apps	Goals	Apps	Goals
1	GK	Paweł Kapsa	19	0	2	0	21	0
2	DF	Rafał Janicki	3	0	0	0	3	0
3	DF	Vytautas Andriuškevičius	17	0	3	0	20	0
4	DF	Sergejs Kožans	10	0	2	0	12	0
5	DF	Krzysztof Bąk	29	1	6	0	35	1
6	DF	Luka Vučko	15	2	4	0	19	2
6	MF	Damian Szuprytowski	2	0	0	0	2	0
7	MF	Abdou Traoré	27	12	6	1	33	13
8	MF	Łukasz Surma	30	1	5	0	35	1
9	FW	Alyaksandr Sazankow	9	1	2	0	11	1
10	FW	Tomasz Dawidowski	18	1	6	0	24	1
11	FW	Ivans Lukjanovs	29	2	6	1	35	3
14	MF	Piotr Wiśniewski	11	3	1	0	12	3
15	FW	Jakub Zejglic	4	0	0	0	4	0
16	MF	Jakub Popielarz	4	0	0	0	4	0
17	MF	Marcin Pietrowski	23	0	6	0	29	0
18	FW	Bédi Buval	23	2	6	1	29	3
20	DF	Levon Hayrapetyan	10	0	2	0	12	0
20	FW	Paweł Buzała	14	4	1	0	15	4
21	DF	Hubert Wołąkiewicz	11	1	1	0	12	1
22	MF	Paweł Nowak	29	4	6	0	35	4
23	MF	Marko Bajić	20	1	5	0	25	1
25	MF	Marek Zieńczuk	3	0	0	0	3	0
25	MF	Kamil Poźniak	12	0	4	0	16	0
26	DF	Deleu	28	0	4	0	32	0
29	MF	Marcin Kaczmarek	7	0	1	0	8	0
33	GK	Sebastian Małkowski	11	0	4	0	15	0

=== Goalscorers ===
Rank	Player	Goals
1	Abdou Traoré	13
2	Paweł Buzała	4
2	Paweł Nowak	4
4	Ivans Lukjanovs	3
4	Piotr Wiśniewski	3
4	Bédi Buval	3
7	Luka Vučko	2
8	Krzysztof Bąk	1
8	Łukasz Surma	1
8	Alyaksandr Sazankow	1
8	Tomasz Dawidowski	1
8	Hubert Wołąkiewicz	1
8	Marko Bajić	1
