= Piotr Wiśniewski =

Polish footballer

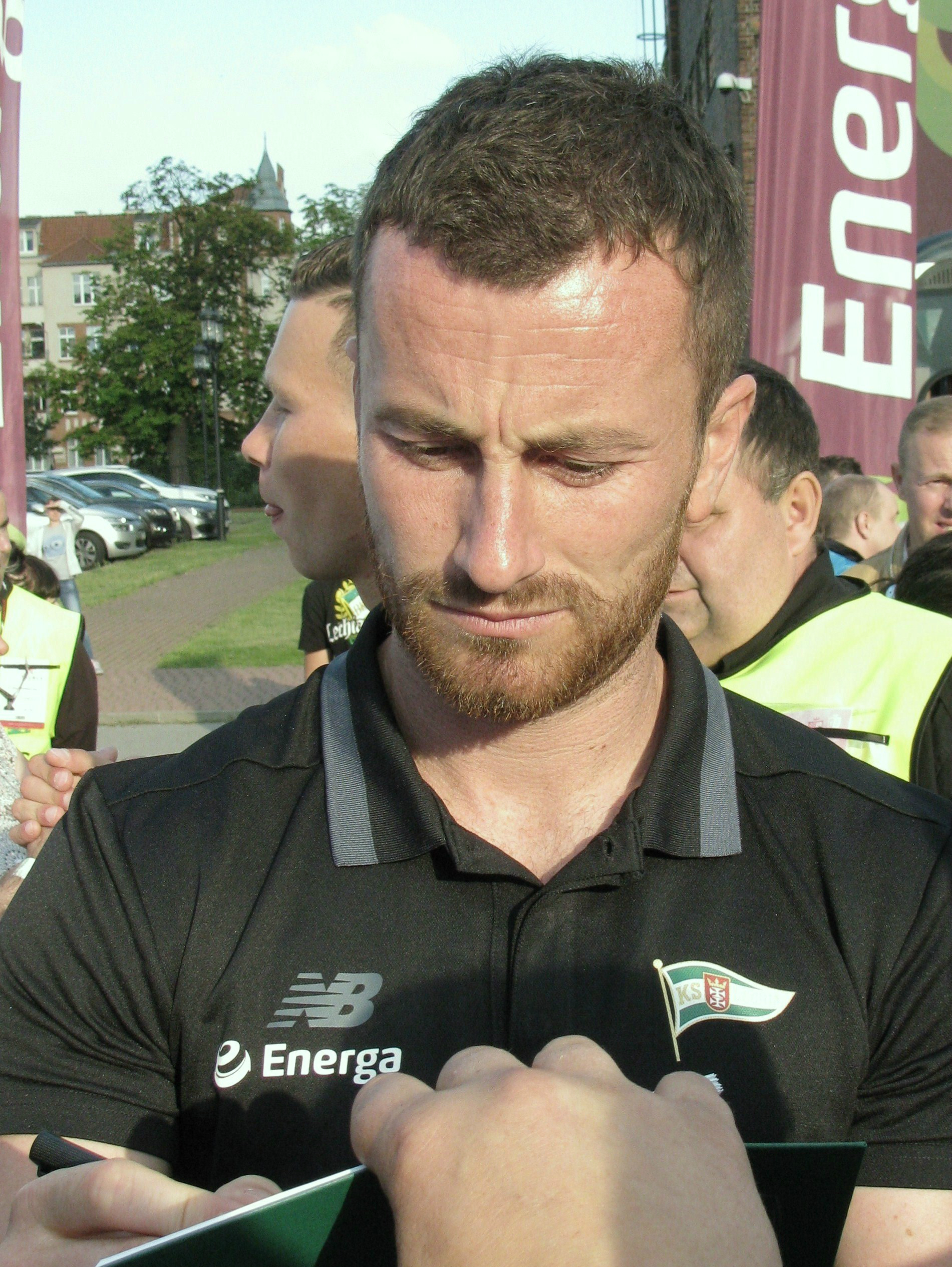

Personal information
- Full name: Piotr Wiśniewski
- Date of birth: 11 August 1982 (age 44)
- Place of birth: Starogard Gdański, Poland
- Height: 1.77 m (5 ft 9 1/2 in)
- Position: Midfielder

Senior career*
Years	Team	Apps	(Gls)
2000–2003	Wierzyca Starogard Gdański		
2003–2004	Kaszubia Kościerzyna		
2005–2017	Lechia Gdańsk	240	(43)
2009–2016	Lechia Gdańsk II	15	(11)
2017–2018	AS Pomorze Gdańsk	9	(1)
2023–2024	Tylko Lechia Gdańsk	2	(1)
- * Club domestic league appearances and goals

Piotr Wiśniewski (born 11 August 1982) is a Polish former professional footballer who played as a midfielder. All four of his teams were based in the Pomeranian area, with his longest and most notable spell with Lechia Gdańsk from 2005 until 2017, when he retired from professional football. During his 13 seasons at Lechia, he became a club icon, ranking highly in both all-time appearances and goals for the club.

== Career ==
=== Early years ===
Wiśniewski started his career with his local team Wierzyca Starogard Gdański, playing with them from 2000–03 in the lower leagues of Polish football. For the 2003–04 season Wiśniewski joined Kaszubia Kościerzyna in the II liga. During the 2004–05 season, Wiśniewski left Kaszubia and dropped down a division in winter transfer window to play for Lechia Gdańsk.

=== Lechia Gdańsk ===
Immediately with Lechia he won the III liga, seeing Lechia back in the II liga for the first time since they had to restart in the lower divisions in 2001. The next three seasons saw Lechia rise up the league, eventually winning the division in the 2007–08 season. Wiśniewski played 16 games that season scoring four goals as he helped Lechia to the title. 2008–09 saw Lechia in the Ekstraklasa, with Wiśniewski playing 23 times in his first season in the top flight. Lechia initially struggled in the top division, finishing mid-table or in the bottom half in the first four seasons. Wiśniewski was consistent in those seasons scoring three goals in each season, and playing in most of Lechia's games. On 14 August 2011, Wiśniewski played in Lechia Gdańsk's first ever game in their new stadium, PGE Arena, coming on in the 77th minute for Marcin Pietrowski. The move into the new stadium saw Lechia's fortunes in the league improve. Despite a difficult first season where Lechia finished 13th, and then 8th, they then went on to finish in the top 5 for the next four seasons. After the move into the PGE Arena, Wiśniewski consistently played over 20 games a season, with his most successful personal seasons coming in 2012–13, when he scored a career high of seven goals in all competitions, and in 2013–14 when he played in a career high of 29 games. In the 2014–15 season, Lechia finished in 5th place, narrowly missing out on qualification for the Europa League by one place. During this season, Wiśniewski played 23 times and scored six goals in the league. This proved to be his last season playing consistently in the first team, with Wiśniewski only making ten and four league games in his final two seasons, respectively. 2016–17 was his final season in professional football. In the last home game of the season against Pogoń Szczecin, Lechia celebrated the careers of Wiśniewski and Mateusz Bąk; both players had played over 10 years for Lechia. Both came on as substitutes in the 4–0 win over Pogoń, with Wiśniewski scoring the final goal of the game, while Bąk made an important save to keep a clean sheet for the team. In total, Wiśniewski played 260 times for Lechia, scoring 48 goals.

=== Retirement and coaching ===
After leaving Lechia, he joined amateur team AS Pomorze Gdańsk for a season before it was announced that Wiśniewski would be returning to Lechia as a first-team coach, before becoming a Lechia Gdańsk II coach at the start of the 2018–19 season.

== Career statistics ==
=== Club ===
Appearances and goals by club, season and competition
Club	Season	League			National cup (Note: Includes Polish Cup and Ekstraklasa Cup)		Total	
Club	Season	Division	Apps	Goals	Apps	Goals	Apps	Goals
Lechia Gdańsk	2004–05	III liga, group II	6	0	1	0	7	0
Lechia Gdańsk	2005–06	II liga	18	2	—		18	2
Lechia Gdańsk	2006–07	II liga	28	9	2	0	30	9
Lechia Gdańsk	2007–08	II liga	16	4	2	1	18	5
Lechia Gdańsk	2008–09	Ekstraklasa	23	3	2	0	25	3
Lechia Gdańsk	2009–10	Ekstraklasa	28	3	3	0	31	3
Lechia Gdańsk	2010–11	Ekstraklasa	11	3	1	0	12	3
Lechia Gdańsk	2011–12	Ekstraklasa	21	3	0	0	21	3
Lechia Gdańsk	2012–13	Ekstraklasa	24	6	2	1	26	7
Lechia Gdańsk	2013–14	Ekstraklasa	29	3	3	1	32	4
Lechia Gdańsk	2014–15	Ekstraklasa	23	6	1	0	24	6
Lechia Gdańsk	2015–16	Ekstraklasa	9	0	1	2	10	2
Lechia Gdańsk	2016–17	Ekstraklasa	4	1	2	0	6	1
Lechia Gdańsk	Total		240	43	20	5	260	48
Career total			240	43	20	5	260	48

== Honours ==
Lechia Gdańsk

- II liga: 2007–08
- III liga, group II: 2004–05

Tylko Lechia Gdańsk

- Klasa B Gdańsk II: 2023–24
