= Marcin Pietrowski =

Polish footballer (born 1988)

Personal information
- Full name: Marcin Pietrowski
- Date of birth: 1 March 1988 (age 38)
- Place of birth: Gdańsk, Poland
- Height: 1.84 m (6 ft 1/2 in)
- Position: Defensive midfielder

Youth career
- Lechia Gdańsk

Senior career*
Years	Team	Apps	(Gls)
2004–2015	Lechia Gdańsk	168	(5)
2015–2020	Piast Gliwice	128	(2)
2020–2021	Miedź Legnica	12	(0)
2021	Miedź Legnica II	11	(2)
2021–2025	Jaguar Gdańsk	103	(9)
2025	Tylko Lechia Gdańsk	26	(5)

International career
2010	Poland U21	2	(0)
- * Club domestic league appearances and goals as of 17:55, 30 June 2026 (UTC)

Marcin Pietrowski (born 1 March 1988) is a Polish professional footballer who plays as a defensive midfielder.

== Career ==
=== Miedź Legnica ===
On 7 February 2020, Miedź Legnica confirmed that Pietrowski had joined the club on a deal until June 2021. In January 2021, he no longer appeared as a part of the club's squad on Miedź' official website, although there were no reports about him leaving the club.

== Career statistics ==
As of match played 8 November 2025

Appearances and goals by club, season and competition
Club	Season	League			Polish Cup		Europe		Total	
Club	Season	Division	Apps	Goals	Apps	Goals	Apps	Goals	Apps	Goals
Lechia Gdańsk	2004–05	III liga, group II	1	0	—		—		1	0
Lechia Gdańsk	2005–06	II liga	0	0	0	0	—		0	0
Lechia Gdańsk	2006–07	II liga	20	0	1	0	—		21	0
Lechia Gdańsk	2007–08	II liga	7	0	1	0	—		8	0
Lechia Gdańsk	2008–09	Ekstraklasa	0	0	0	0	—		0	0
Lechia Gdańsk	2009–10	Ekstraklasa	23	0	5	0	—		28	0
Lechia Gdańsk	2010–11	Ekstraklasa	23	0	6	0	—		29	0
Lechia Gdańsk	2011–12	Ekstraklasa	23	1	1	0	—		24	1
Lechia Gdańsk	2012–13	Ekstraklasa	24	1	2	0	—		26	1
Lechia Gdańsk	2013–14	Ekstraklasa	28	3	3	0	—		31	3
Lechia Gdańsk	2014–15	Ekstraklasa	19	0	1	0	—		20	0
Lechia Gdańsk	Total		168	5	20	0	—		188	5
Piast Gliwice	2015–16	Ekstraklasa	34	0	0	0	—		34	0
Piast Gliwice	2016–17	Ekstraklasa	33	1	1	0	1 (Note: Appearance in UEFA Europa League)	0	35	1
Piast Gliwice	2017–18	Ekstraklasa	32	0	2	0	—		34	0
Piast Gliwice	2018–19	Ekstraklasa	25	1	0	0	—		25	1
Piast Gliwice	2019–20	Ekstraklasa	4	0	3	0	3 (Note: Two appearances in UEFA Champions League, one appearance in UEFA Europa League)	0	10	0
Piast Gliwice	Total		128	2	6	0	4	0	138	2
Miedź Legnica	2019–20	I liga	7	0	1	0	—		8	0
Miedź Legnica	2020–21	I liga	5	0	0	0	—		5	0
Miedź Legnica	Total		12	0	1	0	—		13	0
Miedź Legnica II	2020–21	III liga, gr. III	11	2	—		—		11	2
Jaguar Gdańsk	2021–22	IV liga Pomerania	27	0	—		—		27	0
Jaguar Gdańsk	2022–23	IV liga Pomerania	33	3	—		—		33	3
Jaguar Gdańsk	2023–24	IV liga Pomerania	29	5	—		—		29	5
Jaguar Gdańsk	2024–25	IV liga Pomerania	14	1	—		—		14	1
Jaguar Gdańsk	Total		103	9	—		—		103	9
Tylko Lechia Gdańsk	2024–25	Klasa A Gdańsk II	14 (Note: Includes two appearances in Klasa A promotion play-offs)	4	—		—		14	4
Tylko Lechia Gdańsk	2025–26	Klasa A Gdańsk II	12	1	—		—		12	1
Tylko Lechia Gdańsk	Total		26	5	—		—		26	5
Career total			448	23	27	0	4	0	479	23

== Honours ==
Lechia Gdańsk

- II liga: 2007–08
- III liga, group II: 2004–05

Lechia Gdańsk II

- IV liga Pomerania: 2009–10

Piast Gliwice

- Ekstraklasa: 2018–19
