= Kmita Zabierzów =

- Full name: Akademia Piłkarska Kmita Zabierzów
- Founded: 1936; 90 years ago 2011; 15 years ago (as Akademia Piłkarska 2011)
- Ground: Gminny Stadion Sportowy
- Capacity: 2,000
- Chairman: Adam Stadnik
- Manager: Piotr Trzepatowski
- League: V liga Lesser Poland West
- 2024–25: V liga Lesser Poland West, 12th of 17
- Website: https://akademiakmita.pl
Home colours	Away colours

Kmita Zabierzów (Polish pronunciation: [ˈkmita zaˈbʲɛʐuf]) is a multi-sports club, best known for its football section, based in Zabierzów, Lesser Poland, Poland.

The club founded in 1936 as the local Wisła Kraków branch, belonged to the LZS sports clubs' union for most of its history.

They restructured in 2011 and the club became an academy focused on youth players. The club's colors are white and black.

== Achievements ==
- 3 seasons at the second tier: 2006–07 (14th), 2007–08 (15th), 2008–09 (18th)

== History ==
The club was founded in 1936 as an affiliate club of Wisła Kraków. After World War II, its name was changed first to LZS Zabierzowianka, and then to LKS Kmita.

In 2007, the club signed a contract with Gellwe, the manufacturer of the Tiger energy drink, playing as "Tiger Kmita" from March to October of that year.

In 2011, a new association, initially called Akademia Piłkarska 2011 Zabierzów, was founded. In January 2014, its current name, Akademia Piłkarska Kmita Zabierzów was adopted, as the name Kmita is widely recognized in the football circles in Poland.

=== League history ===
In the 2000–01 season, the club finished 6th in the Kraków group of the regional league, the fifth tier of Polish association football at the time, 16 points behind the leader, Puszcza Niepołomice. However, from the following season, the club started to steadily progress up the league ladder. They won the fifth tier in 2002–03 with a ten-point advantage over the second team. The following season, Kmita won the fourth tier competition with a 20-point advantage, progressed through playoffs against Okocimski Brzesko and was promoted to the third division. In the third tier, Kmita finished 5th in 2004–05 before winning the league in 2005–06 and being promoted to the II liga, the second tier.

In the 2006–07 edition of the II liga, Kmita only managed to finish 14th out of 18 clubs. This resulted in them having to participate in playoffs against Pelikan Łowicz which Kmita lost. However, the club avoided relegation as Pogoń Szczecin, who were due to participate in the second-tier competition, were denied a license to do so. Hence, despite losing the playoffs, Kmita remained in the second tier, finishing 15th the following season.

Kmita started the 2008–09 season in the I liga. (Note: In 2008, the second tier of Polish association football, the II liga, was renamed to I liga.) However, the club was forced to withdraw at the halfway stage of the season due to the fact that the main sponsor decided to cease financing Kmita and move to another club.

Following the withdrawal from the second tier, Kmita joined the III liga, the fourth division. After a mid-table finish in 2009–10, the club started to experience financial problems again, leading to some players from team's first squad leaving the club before the next season started. More followed during the winter break. In March 2011, before the start of the spring round, the club withdrew from the fourth tier competition due to being unable to pay the debts it owed to the tax authorities and other institutions.

The new association has since been playing in the liga okręgowa, the sixth tier league, from the 2011–12 season. In 2024, they were crowned champions of the Kraków II group of the regional league, resulting in promotion to the V liga.
