= Hubert Wołąkiewicz =

Polish footballer (born 1985)

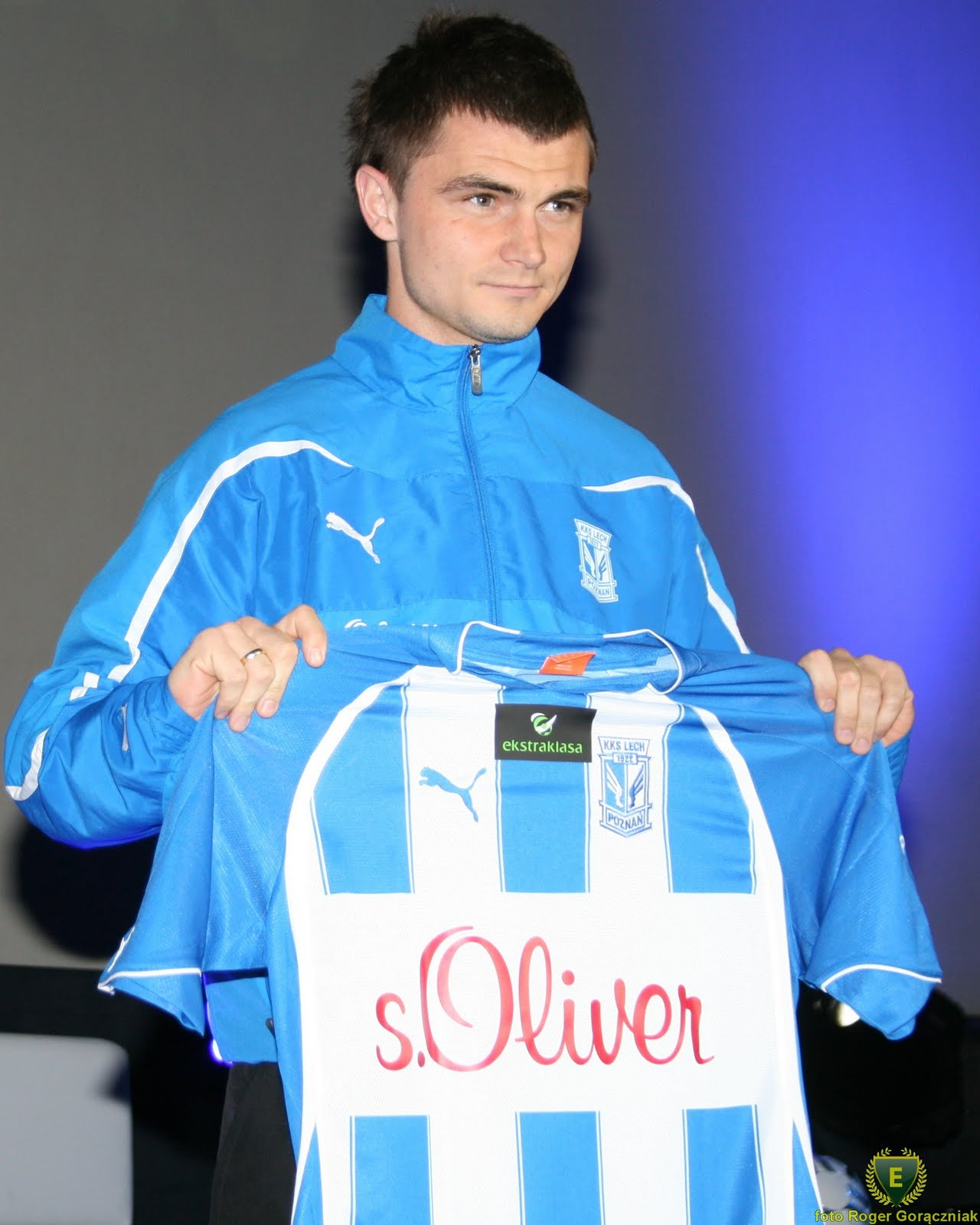
- Wołąkiewicz in 2011

Personal information
- Date of birth: 21 October 1985 (age 41)
- Place of birth: Skarżysko-Kamienna, Poland
- Height: 1.82 m (6 ft 0 in)
- Position: Centre-back

Youth career
- Olimpijczyk Płońsk
- Tęcza 34 Płońsk
- 2002–2003: Amica Wronki

Senior career*
Years	Team	Apps	(Gls)
2003–2007	Amica Wronki		
2007–2010	Lechia Gdańsk	99	(5)
2011–2014	Lech Poznań	104	(4)
2015	Astra Giurgiu	1	(0)
2015–2017	Cracovia	58	(0)
2017–2020	Chojniczanka Chojnice	61	(7)
2020	Widzew Łódź	9	(0)
2021–2024	Wiara Lecha Poznań	47	(5)

International career
2010–2011	Poland	4	(0)
- * Club domestic league appearances and goals

Hubert Wołąkiewicz (born 21 October 1985) is a Polish former professional footballer who played as a centre-back.

== Club career ==
He started his football career in Tęcza 34 Płońsk. In 2002, he joined Amica Wronki and played for their junior teams until the end of the 2002–03 season, before being promoted to the reserve team. On 11 April 2006, he made his Ekstraklasa debut in a 0–3 defeat against Korona Kielce. After Amica merged with Lech Poznań, Wołąkiewicz remained in the team from Wronki and played with them in the 2006–07 season in the third league.

In July 2007, Wołąkiewicz moved to the second-league Lechia Gdańsk, where he quickly became the main defender. In the 2007–08 season, he and his team won promotion to the Ekstraklasa. On 7 August 2009, he scored the first goal in the top-flight in a 6–2 win against Cracovia.

On 3 January 2011, Wołąkiewicz signed a contract with Lech Poznań. He made his debut on 20 February 2011 in the cup match against Polonia Warsaw. He played 128 games for Lech, scoring four goals. He also played with the team from Poznań in the UEFA Europa League.

In February 2015, he joined the Romanian Astra Giurgiu, which he left after playing one league match. On 15 June 2015, he signed a two-year contract with Cracovia. He made his debut on July 17 in a 1–0 against Lechia Gdańsk. In the colors of the Stripes he played 64 matches. In 2017, he moved to Chojniczanka Chojnice playing in the first league. Throughout three seasons, he made 67 appearances and scored seven goals. In the winter of 2020, he signed a six-month contract with Widzew Łódź. On 1 March 2020, he made his debut in a 2–2 draw in the second league against Olimpia Elbląg. On 19 July 2020, in a league match with Resovia, due to the limit of substitutions of the Łódź team and Wojciech Pawłowski's red card, Wołąkiewicz took his place in goal. It was the first time since 2001 a field player replaced the goalkeeper in an official Widzew match.

== International career ==
He made his full international debut on 12 October 2010 in a 2–2 draw against Ecuador.

== Honours ==
Lechia Gdańsk

- II liga: 2007–08

Lech Poznań

- Ekstraklasa: 2014–15

Wiara Lecha Poznań

- V liga Greater Poland, group II: 2022–23
