= Maciej Kostrzewa =

Polish footballer

Personal information
- Full name: Maciej Kostrzewa
- Date of birth: 16 May 1991 (age 35)
- Place of birth: Gdańsk, Poland
- Height: 1.90 m (6 ft 3 in)
- Position: Midfielder

Team information
- Current team: Tylko Lechia Gdańsk
- Number: 14

Youth career
- –2011: Lechia Gdańsk

Senior career*
Years	Team	Apps	(Gls)
2011–2014	Lechia Gdańsk II	29	(1)
2011–2014	Lechia Gdańsk	16	(0)
2014–2015	Wisła Płock	22	(0)
2016	Chojniczanka Chojnice	8	(0)
2017–2022	AS Pomorze Gdańsk	77	(36)
2023–	Tylko Lechia Gdańsk	21	(3)
- * Club domestic league appearances and goals as of 13:35, 30 June 2025 (UTC)

Maciej Kostrzewa (born 16 May 1991) is a Polish footballer who plays as a midfielder for regional league club Tylko Lechia Gdańsk.

== Honours ==
Tylko Lechia Gdańsk

- Klasa B Gdańsk II: 2023–24
