= Sebastian Madera =

Polish footballer

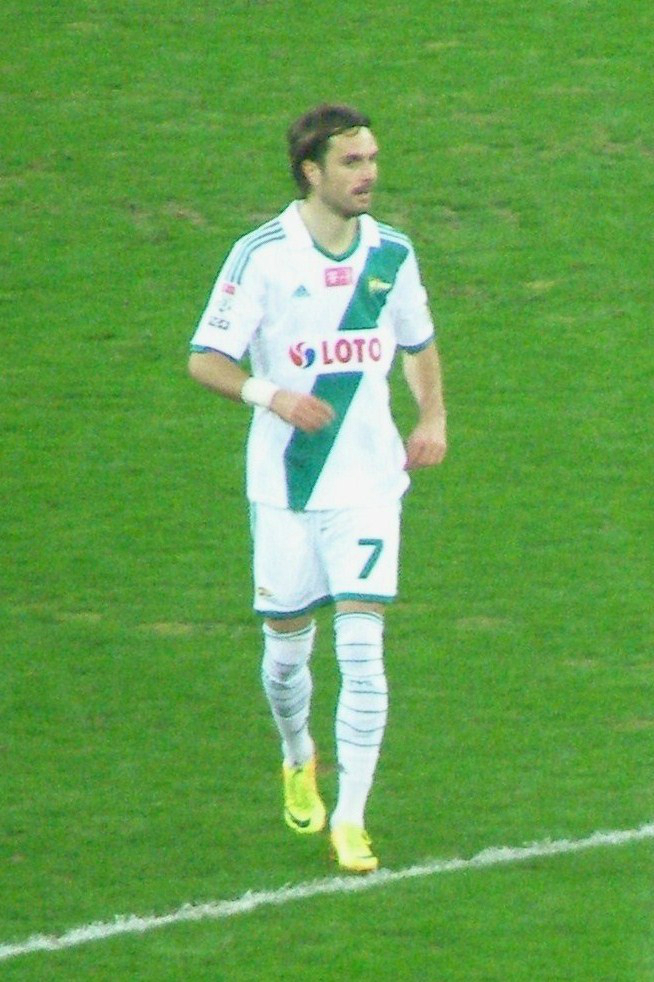
- Madera with Lechia Gdańsk in 2014

Personal information
- Full name: Sebastian Madera
- Date of birth: 30 May 1985 (age 41)
- Place of birth: Rawicz, Poland
- Height: 1.90 m (6 ft 3 in)
- Position: Defender

Senior career*
Years	Team	Apps	(Gls)
2003	Orla Wąsosz		
2003–2004	Miedź Legnica		
2005–2012	Widzew Łódź	29	(2)
2006	→ KKS Koluszki (loan)		
2008–2009	→ Tur Turek (loan)	27	(0)
2012	→ Lechia Gdańsk (loan)	7	(2)
2012	→ Lechia Gdańsk II (loan)	2	(0)
2012–2014	Lechia Gdańsk	37	(1)
2013	Lechia Gdańsk II	1	(0)
2014–2016	Jagiellonia Białystok	54	(1)
2014–2016	Jagiellonia II	1	(1)
2016–2017	Zagłębie Lubin	11	(0)
2016–2017	Zagłębie Lubin II	3	(1)

International career
2004	Poland U19		

Managerial career
- 2018–2019: Widzew Łódź (youth)
- 2019–2021: Lech Poznań (youth)
- 2023–2024: LZS Justynów
- * Club domestic league appearances and goals

Sebastian Madera (born 30 May 1985) is a Polish professional football manager and former player who was most recently in charge of LZS Justynów. Throughout his career, he suffered many injuries.

== Playing career ==
In 2006, Madera was loaned to KKS Koluszki. For the 2008–09 season, Madera was loaned to Tur Turek. In February 2012, he moved from Widzew Łódź to Ekstraklasa club Lechia Gdańsk on a loan deal until the end of the 2011–12 season. After a loan spell, he joined Lechia Gdańsk in a permanent deal.

On 24 June 2014, he signed with Jagiellonia Białystok.

== Coaching career ==
After retiring, Madera returned to Widzew Łódź as a youth coach in 2018. In mid-2019, he joined Lech Poznań's academy, where he operated in a similar role until 2021. Soon after, he became assistant coach of Widzew's under-19 team. In July 2023, Madera took on his first senior managerial role when he became the new head coach of regional league club LZS Justynów. He led the team to a second-place finish, one point behind group champions Zawisza Rzgów. On 3 September 2024, he resigned from his role.

== Managerial statistics ==
As of match played 31 August 2024

Managerial record by team and tenure
Team	From	To	Record							
Team	From	To	G	W	D	L	GF	GA	GD	Win %
LZS Justynów	6 July 2023	3 September 2024	37	25	4	8	96	43	+53	67.57
Total			37	25	4	8	96	43	+53	67.57

== Honours ==
Widzew Łódź

- I liga: 2009–10

Zagłębie Lubin II

- IV liga Lower Silesia West: 2016–17
