= Julian Ripoli =

French footballer (born 1992)

Personal information
- Full name: Julian Vincent Ripoli
- Date of birth: 7 October 1992 (age 34)
- Place of birth: Paris, France
- Height: 1.83 m (6 ft 0 in)
- Position: Midfielder

Youth career
- Co Vincennes
- US Torcy
- –2010: Neuchâtel Xamax
- 2012: Genoa

Senior career*
Years	Team	Apps	(Gls)
2010–2011	Neuchâtel Xamax II	12	(6)
2011–2012	Genoa	0	(0)
2013	Lechia Gdańsk	0	(0)
2013	Lechia Gdańsk II	9	(0)
2013–2014	Universitatea Craiova	5	(0)
2014–2015	Terracina	3	(0)
2015	Battipagliese	0	(0)
Total		29	(6)
- * Club domestic league appearances and goals

Julian Ripoli (born 7 October 1992) is a French former professional footballer who played as a midfielder.

== Biography ==
Born in Paris, Ripoli began playing football for the youth sides of Co Vincennes and US Torcy, both in the suburbs of Paris. He later moved to Switzerland playing in the youth sides for Neuchâtel Xamax, before joining Genoa in Italy. Ripoli’s first professional contract came in 2013 when he joined Polish side Lechia Gdańsk, initially joining the Lechia Gdańsk II team. For the remainder of the 2012–13 season, he played nine times for the Lechia II team and featured in the Młoda Ekstraklasa (under 21’s). At the end of his season, his contract with Lechia was not renewed. For the 2013–14 season, he moved to Romania to play with Universitatea Craiova, playing five times in the league that season as the team won the Romanian Liga II. After his time in Romania he moved back to Italy, joining Terracina Calcio 1925 for a season before a short spell with ASD Battipagliese. After failing to consistently play for either team he retired from professional football in 2015.

In 2017 Ripoli created and is the owner of OLO Records, being based in Paris. Ripoli has created his own music with his brother under the name “Miroloja”.

== Honours ==
Universitatea Craiova

- Liga II: 2013–14
