= Mateusz Bąk =

Polish footballer (1983–2026)

Personal information
- Date of birth: 24 February 1983
- Place of birth: Pruszcz Gdański, Poland
- Date of death: 3 August 2026 (aged 43)
- Height: 1.88 m (6 ft 2 in)
- Position: Goalkeeper

Youth career
- Jantar Pruszcz Gdański
- Lechia Gdańsk

Senior career*
Years	Team	Apps	(Gls)
2001–2011	Lechia Gdańsk	171	(1)
2009–2011	→ Lechia Gdańsk II	4	(0)
2010	→ Marítimo (loan)	0	(0)
2011	Wisła Płock	5	(0)
2011–2012	Podbeskidzie Bielsko-Biała	15	(0)
2013	Etar 1924	3	(0)
2013–2017	Lechia Gdańsk	49	(0)
2013–2016	→ Lechia Gdańsk II	20	(0)
Total		267	(1)
- * Club domestic league appearances and goals

Mateusz Bąk (24 February 1983 – 3 August 2026) was a Polish professional footballer who played as a goalkeeper, spending the majority of his career playing for Lechia Gdańsk. Over the course of his career, Bąk was involved in six promotion winning seasons, five with Lechia Gdańsk and one with Wisła Płock.

== Career ==
=== Lechia Gdańsk ===
A trainee of Jantar Pruszcz Gdański and Lechia Gdańsk, Bąk joined the Lechia first team in 2001. In 1998, Lechia formed a merger with Polonia Gdańsk to create Lechia-Polonia Gdańsk. After three unsuccessful years, Lechia wished to play football again independently which resulted in them having to re-start in the regional divisions of the sixth tier. For an 18-year-old Bąk, this offered a chance for consistent playing time with the football team he grew up supporting. In his first season, Bąk played 22 times for Lechia, including scoring the final goal in the 15–0 win over LKS Waplewo from the penalty spot in stoppage time. In his first four seasons, Lechia achieved four promotions, winning each of the leagues along the way. By this point Lechia had reached the II liga, the second tier in Polish football at the time. After finishes of 10th and 5th the following two seasons, Lechia achieved promotion by winning the league in 2008. In his first season in Ekstraklasa, Bąk appeared in 12 league games, making 7 appearances in the first half of the following season as the second choice goalkeeper. To supporters, Bąk become the symbol of a "new" Lechia Gdańsk due to him being the only player to stay with the team from the sixth tier right up to the first division.

=== Portugal, Poland and Bulgaria ===
After losing his place in the first team, Bąk moved to Portuguese side Marítimo on loan for the second half of the season, with an option to make the move permanent. After failing to make any appearances during the loan spell, Marítimo decided against the permanent transfer. He returned to Lechia where he briefly played for the second team, Lechia Gdańsk II. Bąk moved to Wisła Płock over the winter transfer window, and made five appearances for Wisła in 2011, helping the team to win promotion from the II liga. In July 2011, he joined Podbeskidzie Bielsko-Biała on a two-year contract moving back to Ekstraklasa. This was Podbeskidzie's first ever season in the Ekstraklasa, with Bąk making 12 appearances to help the team avoid relegation. The following season he only made three appearances in the opening half of the season, and joined Bulgarian top division club Etar 1924 in early 2013. For Etar, he only made three appearances, including a 6–1 defeat and a sending off in another game. His time at Etar was part of a tumultuous time for the club, including 20 players signed during the January transfer window, death threats to players from the club's president, the club taking 80% of players wages, the club no longer paying for food and hotels for players to stay in, and the club providing no training sessions after the club's head coach left. While Bąk and three other Polish players were only on four-month contracts, the Polish Football Association helped them to get out of their contracts early due to the terrible conditions provided by the club.

=== Return to Lechia Gdańsk ===
After the unsuccessful spell in Bulgaria, Bąk left Etar only six months after joining, returning to Poland to play with Lechia in July 2013. His return to Lechia saw him once again playing regular football, something he hadn't experienced since his first spell at the club. In the first two seasons of his return, he made 27 and 21 appearances for Lechia in the league. With younger goalkeepers being transferred to the team, he found himself playing a bigger role in the development of these other goalkeepers. For the 2015–16 season, Bąk was kept out of the first team, instead having to settle for Lechia Gdańsk II team, playing 20 times for the reserves team that season. With opportunities in the first team now limited for Bąk, he announced his plans for retirement in 2016 aged 33. In the last home game of the season against Pogoń Szczecin, Lechia celebrated the careers of Piotr Wiśniewski and Bąk. Both players had played over 10 years for Lechia, while Lechia was the only professional club Wiśniewski played for. Both players came on as substitutes in the 4–0 win over Pogoń, with Wiśniewski scoring the final goal of the game, while Bąk made an important save to keep a clean sheet for the team. After his retirement, it was announced that Bąk would be staying with Lechia Gdańsk, being given the role as a goalkeeping coach for the academy, before becoming Lechia Gdańsk II's goalkeeping coach at the start of the 2018–19 season.

== Death ==
Bąk died on 3 August 2026, at the age of 43.

== Career statistics ==
Appearances and goals by club, season and competition
Club	Season	League			National cup (Note: Includes Polish Cup and Ekstraklasa Cup)		Total	
Club	Season	Division	Apps	Goals	Apps	Goals	Apps	Goals
Lechia Gdańsk	2001–02	Klasa A (Gdańsk IV)	22	1	8	0	30	1
Lechia Gdańsk	2002–03	Liga okręgowa (Gdańsk II)	29	0	5	0	34	0
Lechia Gdańsk	2003–04	IV Liga Pomerania	23	0	4	0	27	0
Lechia Gdańsk	2004–05	III liga (group II)	12	0	1	0	13	0
Lechia Gdańsk	2005–06	II liga	33	0	0	0	33	0
Lechia Gdańsk	2006–07	II liga	25	0	1	0	26	0
Lechia Gdańsk	2007–08	II liga	8	0	0	0	8	0
Lechia Gdańsk	2008–09	Ekstraklasa	12	0	2	0	14	0
Lechia Gdańsk	2009–10	Ekstraklasa	7	0	0	0	7	0
Lechia Gdańsk	Total		171	1	21	0	192	1
Marítimo (loan)	2009–10	Primeira Liga	0	0	0	0	0	0
Wisła Płock	2010–11	II liga (East)	5	0	0	0	5	0
Podbeskidzie Bielsko-Biała	2011–12	Ekstraklasa	12	0	1	0	13	0
Podbeskidzie Bielsko-Biała	2012–13	Ekstraklasa	3	0	0	0	3	0
Podbeskidzie Bielsko-Biała	Total		15	0	1	0	16	0
Etar Veliko Tarnovo	2012–13	A Group	3	0	–		3	0
Lechia Gdańsk	2013–14	Ekstraklasa	27	0	3	0	30	0
Lechia Gdańsk	2014–15	Ekstraklasa	21	0	1	0	22	0
Lechia Gdańsk	2015–16	Ekstraklasa	0	0	0	0	0	0
Lechia Gdańsk	2016–17	Ekstraklasa	1	0	0	0	1	0
Lechia Gdańsk	Total		49	0	4	0	53	0
Lechia Gdańsk	Lechia total		220	1	25	0	245	1
Career total			243	1	26	0	269	1

== Honours ==
Lechia Gdańsk

- II liga: 2007–08
- III liga (group II): 2004–05
- IV liga (Pomerania): 2003–04
- Liga okręgowa (group Gdańsk II): 2002–03
- Klasa A (group Gdańsk IV): 2001–02
