= Kacper Łazaj =

Polish footballer (born 1995)

Personal information
- Date of birth: 24 July 1995 (age 31)
- Place of birth: Słupsk, Poland
- Height: 1.87 m (6 ft 1 1/2 in)
- Position: Left winger

Team information
- Current team: Grom Nowy Staw
- Number: 16

Youth career
- –2012: Lechia Gdańsk

Senior career*
Years	Team	Apps	(Gls)
2012–2015	Lechia Gdańsk II	30	(6)
2012–2015	Lechia Gdańsk	11	(1)
2014	→ Kolejarz Stróże (loan)	0	(0)
2014–2015	→ Bytovia Bytów (loan)	2	(0)
2015–2016	Raków Częstochowa	11	(2)
2016–2017	KS Chwaszczyno	23	(6)
2017	Concordia Elbląg	15	(2)
2018–2019	KP Starogard Gdański	46	(13)
2019–2020	Radunia Stężyca	15	(0)
2020	KP Starogard Gdański	13	(2)
2021–2022	GKS Przodkowo	38	(3)
2022–2026	BV Garrel	54	(21)
2026–	Grom Nowy Staw	17	(2)

International career
2013	Poland U18	3	(1)
	Poland U19	4	(0)
- * Club domestic league appearances and goals as of 17:32, 21 June 2026 (UTC)

Kacper Łazaj (born 24 July 1995) is a Polish professional footballer who plays as a left winger for III liga club Grom Nowy Staw.

The majority of the teams he has played for have been in the Pomeranian region. He is one of the youngest players to have scored in the Ekstraklasa, and is Lechia Gdańsk's all-time youngest scorer in Ekstraklasa. Despite early signs of a promising career, after leaving Lechia in 2015 Łazaj has spent the majority of his career in II liga and III liga (third and fourth tiers).

== Career ==
=== Lechia Gdańsk ===
Łazaj joined Lechia Gdańsk in his youth and progressed through the youth teams, joining the first team squad for the first time at the start of the 2012–13 season. On 8 October 2012, he made his debut for Lechia Gdańsk, aged 17 years, 2 months and 14 days, becoming Lechia's youngest ever player to make an appearance for the first team in Ekstraklasa. This record was later broken by Mateusz Żukowski in 2017. Another accolade of Łazaj's is that of being Lechia's youngest goalscorer in the Ekstraklasa, for his goal against Ruch Chorzów on 9 November 2012. This is a Lechia Gdańsk record that Łazaj still holds. During the 2012–13 season, he made a total of 12 appearances, scoring one goal. After his first season breakthrough, he went on loan to Kolejarz Stróże for half a season in the I liga, before spending the whole of the 2014–15 season in the I liga with Bytovia Bytów, only managing to make two league appearances. After struggling to make an impact while on loan, his contract was not renewed and he left Lechia in July 2015.

=== Lower leagues ===
On 30 July 2015, Łazaj joined Raków Częstochowa. Raków finished in a respectable 5th place during the 2015–16 season, but Łazaj struggled getting into the first team, playing 11 times and scoring twice. After it was clear Łazaj was not in first team contention, he moved to KS Chwaszczyno on 31 August 2016. Łazaj had a more successful season with Chwaszczyno in the III liga. He managed 23 appearances with six goals, helping Chwaszczyno to a 12th place finish. Łazaj was once again on the move the following summer, this time moving to Concordia Elbląg. He moved to the fifth tier with Concordia and played 15 games scoring two goals. In January 2018, he joined KP Starogard Gdański in the division higher. As soon as he joined Starogard Gdanski, he found himself in the starting eleven. In the autumn round of the 2017–18 season, Łazaj made 15 appearances, scoring two goals. The following season, 2018–19, has been Łazaj's most successful yet, making his most appearances in a season, 31, and scoring his most goals in a season, 11, helping Starogard Gdanski to a mid-table finish. On 5 July 2019, Łazaj was on the move again, this time joining Radunia Stężyca. Łazaj started regularly for Radunia during the first part of the season, in a season that eventually had to be abandoned due to the coronavirus pandemic in Poland. During the summer of 2020, Łazaj returned to KP Starogard Gdanski, spending half a season with the club before moving on again to join GKS Przodkowo midway through the season.
