= Michał Pruchnik =

Polish association football player

Personal information
- Full name: Michał Pruchnik
- Date of birth: 4 July 1991 (age 35)
- Place of birth: Przemyśl, Poland
- Height: 1.72 m (5 ft 8 in)
- Position: Forward

Youth career
- Czuwaj Przemyśl
- –2007: Stal Mielec

Senior career*
Years	Team	Apps	(Gls)
2007–2009	Stal Mielec		
2009–2013	Lechia Gdańsk	0	(0)
2009–2011	Lechia Gdańsk II	32	(11)
2011	→ Bałtyk Gdynia (loan)	8	(1)
2012–2013	→ Stal Mielec (loan)	38	(16)
2013–2014	Stal Mielec	19	(0)
2018	Piast Tuczempy	10	(1)
2018–2019	Korona Rzeszów	5	(0)
2020	Start Pruchnik	1	(0)
- * Club domestic league appearances and goals

Michał Pruchnik (born 4 July 1991) is a Polish former professional footballer who played as a forward.

== Senior career ==
Pruchnik's career started with Stal Mielec in 2007 after having moved from the club's youth team. In 2009 he joined Lechia Gdańsk, however after four seasons with the club he failed to play for the first team, but had managed 32 games and 11 goals for the Lechia second team. While contracted with Lechia, Pruchnik had two loan spells, firstly with Bałtyk Gdynia before joining Stal Mielec. He rejoined Stal permanently after the loan deal. His time at Stal wasn't as successful as his loan spell, and after a season he had left the club, failing to score a goal. He spent four years out of football before returning to play for Piast Tuczempy and Korona Rzeszów in 2018.

== Honours ==
Lechia Gdańsk II

- IV liga Pomerania: 2009–10

Stal Mielec

- III liga Lublin–Subcarpathia: 2012–13
