= Mariusz Korzępa =

Polish footballer

Personal information
- Full name: Mariusz Korzępa
- Date of birth: 17 January 1991
- Place of birth: Kolbuszowa, Poland
- Date of death: 26 March 2016 (aged 25)
- Place of death: Rzeszów, Poland
- Height: 1.70 m (5 ft 7 in)
- Position: Midfielder

Youth career
- Kolbuszowianka Kolbuszowa
- Orły Rzeszów
- 2004–2008: Stal Mielec

Senior career*
Years	Team	Apps	(Gls)
2008–2009	Stal Mielec	26	(4)
2009–2012	Lechia Gdańsk	0	(0)
2009–2011	Lechia Gdańsk II	33	(4)
2012	→ Siarka Tarnobrzeg (loan)	12	(1)
2012–2014	Stal Mielec	14	(0)
2014–2015	Czarni Połaniec	10	(4)
2015	Stal Mielec	4	(1)
2015	Siarka Tarnobrzeg	13	(0)
2016	Wólczanka Wólka Pełkińska	1	(0)
Total		114	(14)
- * Club domestic league appearances and goals

Mariusz Korzępa (17 January 1991 – 26 March 2016) was a Polish footballer who played as a midfielder.

== Biography ==
Korzępa was born in the small town of Kolbuszowa in South East Poland. Korzępa started playing football in the youth levels of his local team, Kolbuszowianka Kolbuszowa and Orły Rzeszów, before joining the biggest team in the area, Stal Mielec. After four seasons in the Stal youth teams, Korzępa was moved to the first team, making his debut in 2008. After 26 league appearances in his first season in the first team, Korzępa joined Ekstraklasa team Lechia Gdańsk. Korzępa instantly joined the Lechia Gdańsk II team to develop, making his debut for the team in a 2–0 win against Czarni Czarne. The following season, he made his most appearances for the Lechia II team, with 19 appearances and 4 goals. The following season, Korzępa joined Siarka Tarnobrzeg on loan, before making a permanent transfer to Stal Mielec at the end of the season. While playing for Stal against Tomasovia Tomaszów Lubelski, Korzępa picked up an injury which kept him out for a season. Korzępa then joined Czarni Połaniec, scoring four goals in 10 appearances, before quickly returning to play for Stal Mielec for a third time. After only four appearances on his return, Korzępa joined Siarka Tarnobrzeg for the second time spending six months with the team and making 13 appearances in the league. Korzępa joined his final team, Wólczanka Wólka Pełkińska, at the beginning of 2016. He made his only appearance for the team against Orzeł Przeworsk in a 1–1 draw.

On 26 March 2016, Wólczanka Wólka Pełkińska were travelling to play an away game against Avia Świdnik. Eight members of the squad were travelling together in a van, which ended up colliding with a truck. The accident instantly killed three players, Kamil Pydych, Rafał Pydych and Patryk Szewczak. Five other players were seriously injured, including Korzępa. Mariusz Korzępa died in hospital six days after the accident. Korzępa was due to be married in the summer, and had a four-month-old child. In total, the crash killed 5 members of the Wólczanka Wólka Pełkińska squad, and forcing another to retire from their injuries.

== Honours ==
Lechia Gdańsk II

- IV liga Pomerania: 2009–10

Siarka Tarnobrzeg

- III liga Lublin–Subcarpathia: 2011–12

Stal Mielec

- III liga Lublin–Subcarpathia: 2012–13
