= Mohamed Rahoui =

Algerian footballer (born 1988)

Personal information
- Full name: Mohamed El Amine Rahoui
- Date of birth: 2 November 1988 (age 38)
- Place of birth: Oran, Algeria
- Height: 1.85 m (6 ft 1 in)
- Position: Left midfielder

Youth career
- –2009: AC Ajaccio

Senior career*
Years	Team	Apps	(Gls)
2009–2010	AC Ajaccio B		
2010–2011	OM Arzew		
2011–2012	Olympique Noisy-le-Sec	4	(1)
2012–2013	SA Mohammadia		
2013	Lechia Gdańsk	3	(0)
2013	Lechia Gdańsk II	6	(1)
2013–2015	SA Mohammadia		
2015–2017	IB Khémis El Khechna		
2017	JS Suresnes		
- * Club domestic league appearances and goals

Mohamed El Amine Rahoui is an Algerian footballer who plays as a left midfielder.

== Club career ==
In January 2013, Rahoui signed a six-month contract with Polish club Lechia Gdańsk after spending two weeks on trial.
