= Tomasz Podgórski =

Polish footballer

Personal information
- Full name: Tomasz Podgórski
- Date of birth: 30 December 1985 (age 40)
- Place of birth: Gliwice, Poland
- Height: 1.75 m (5 ft 9 in)
- Position: Attacking midfielder

Team information
- Current team: Piast Gliwice II (manager)

Youth career
- Piast Gliwice

Senior career*
Years	Team	Apps	(Gls)
2002–2015	Piast Gliwice	274	(31)
2009–2010	→ Zawisza Bydgoszcz (loan)	15	(1)
2015–2016	Ruch Chorzów	26	(1)
2016–2018	Podbeskidzie	46	(10)
2018–2020	Ruch Chorzów	48	(2)
2020–2024	Piast Gliwice II	71	(26)
Total		480	(71)

Managerial career
- 2025–: Piast Gliwice II
- * Club domestic league appearances and goals

Tomasz Podgórski (born 30 December 1985) is a Polish professional football manager and former player who played as an attacking midfielder. He is currently in charge of Piast Gliwice II.

== Managerial statistics ==
As of match played 13 September 2026

Managerial record by team and tenure
Team	From	To	Record							
Team	From	To	G	W	D	L	GF	GA	GD	Win %
Piast Gliwice II	1 August 2025	Present	48	21	9	18	108	79	+29	43.75
Total			48	21	9	18	108	79	+29	43.75

== Honours ==
Piast Gliwice

- I liga: 2010–11

Piast Gliwice II

- Regional league Silesia I: 2020–21
