= 2007–08 I liga =

I liga
- Season: 2007–08
- Dates: 28 July 2007 – 24 May 2008
- Champions: Lechia Gdańsk
- Promoted: Lechia Gdańsk; Śląsk Wrocław; Piast Gliwice; Arka Gdynia
- Relegated: ŁKS Łomża; Pelikan Łowicz
- Matches: 306
- Goals: 741 (2.42 per match)
- Top goalscorer: Robert Lewandowski (21 goals)
- Biggest home win: Śląsk 10–1 Motor (14 October 2007)
- Biggest away win: Pelikan 0–5 Polonia (9 September 2007)
- Highest scoring: Śląsk 10–1 Motor (14 October 2007)
- Highest attendance: 11,000; Lechia 1–0 Wisła (15 March 2008)
- Lowest attendance: 0 (Note: Matches have been played behind closed doors without any spectators.); Motor 1–0 Podbeskidzie (15 September 2007); Motor 1–1 Kmita (22 September 2007)
- Total attendance: 969,102
- Average attendance: 3,167 ▲8.2%

The 2007–08 I liga (then known as the II liga) was the 60th season of the I liga, the second highest division in the Polish football league system since its establishment in 1949. The league was operated by the Polish Football Association (PZPN). The league contested by 18 teams who competed for promotion to the 2008–09 Ekstraklasa. The regular season was played in a round-robin tournament. Each team played a total of 34 matches, half at home and half away. The season began on 28 July 2007, and concluded on 24 May 2008.

== Teams ==
The following teams competed in the I liga 2007–08:

9 teams staying in the I liga:

- Kmita Zabierzów
- Lechia Gdańsk
- ŁKS Łomża
- Odra Opole
- Piast Gliwice
- Podbeskidzie Bielsko-Biała
- Polonia Warszawa
- Stal Stalowa Wola
- Śląsk Wrocław

7 teams advancing from the II liga:

- 4 group champions:
  - GKS Jastrzębie
  - Motor Lublin
  - Tur Turek
  - Znicz Pruszków
- 3 advancing by way of the play-offs:
  - GKS Katowice
  - Pelikan Łowicz
  - Warta Poznań

2 teams relegated from the Ekstraklasa:

- Placement in the relegation zone:
  - Wisła Płock
- Involvement in corruption scandal:
  - Arka Gdynia

== League standings ==
Pos	Team	Pld	W	D	L	GF	GA	GD	Pts	Promotion or relegation
1	Lechia Gdańsk (P)	34	21	6	7	55	34	+21	69	Promotion to Ekstraklasa
2	Śląsk Wrocław (P)	34	18	10	6	55	30	+25	64	Promotion to Ekstraklasa
3	Piast Gliwice (P)	34	17	11	6	45	23	+22	62 (Note: PIA: 6 pts,2-0-2, 5–5; ARK: 5 pts, 1-2-1, 7–7; ZNP: 5 pts, 1-2-1, 6–6)	Promotion to Ekstraklasa
4	Arka Gdynia (Note: Arka Gdynia had 5 points deducted for corruption) (P)	34	19	10	5	61	30	+31	62	Promotion to Ekstraklasa
5	Znicz Pruszków	34	18	8	8	54	28	+26	62	
6	Podbeskidzie Bielsko-Biała (Note: Podbeskidzie Bielsko-Biała had 6 points deducted for corruption)	34	19	7	8	53	27	+26	58	
7	Polonia Warsaw (P)	34	14	8	12	45	36	+9	50 (Note: PWA: 4 pts,1-1-0, 5–1; WPK: 1 pt, 0-1-1, 1–5)	Promotion to Ekstraklasa (Note: Polonia Warsaw merged with Ekstraklasa team Dyskobolia and replaced them in Ekstraklasa)
8	Wisła Płock	34	14	8	12	52	51	+1	50	
9	GKS Jastrzębie	34	12	9	13	43	51	−8	45	
10	GKS Katowice	34	11	10	13	38	39	−1	43	
11	Stal Stalowa Wola	34	11	7	16	30	48	−18	40	
12	Motor Lublin	34	10	5	19	33	55	−22	35 (Note: MOL: 4 pts,1-1-0, 3–1; OOP: 1 pt, 0-1-1, 1–3)	
13	Odra Opole	34	8	11	15	28	39	−11	35	
14	Warta Poznań	34	7	11	16	29	45	−16	32	
15	Kmita Zabierzów	34	6	13	15	28	40	−12	31 (Note: KMZ: 3 pts,1-0-1, 3–2; TUT: 3 pts, 1-0-1, 2–3)	
16	Tur Turek	34	7	10	17	23	46	−23	31	
17	ŁKS Łomża (R)	34	8	6	20	32	59	−27	30	Relegation to II liga
18	Pelikan Łowicz (R)	34	6	10	18	37	60	−23	28	Relegation to II liga

Source: 90minut.pl (in Polish)
Rules for classification: 1st points; 2nd head-to-head points; 3rd head-to-head goal difference; 4th head-to-head goals scored; 5th head-to-head away goals scored; 6th goal difference; 7th goals scored
(P) Promoted; (R) Relegated

== Results ==
Home \ Away	ARK	GKJ	KAT	KMZ	LGD	ŁOM	MOL	OOP	PEL	PIA	PBB	PWA	SSW	ŚLĄ	TUT	WAP	WPK	ZNI
Arka Gdynia		1–0	3–2	1–2	1–0	4–0	2–0	1–1	4–0	2–0	3–2	2–0	4–0	1–1	1–1	4–0	4–1	2–2
GKS Jastrzębie	2–0		1–1	2–2	0–1	3–1	1–0	1–1	4–3	0–0	2–2	2–2	3–2	1–2	1–0	2–1	0–1	0–2
GKS Katowice	3–2	0–0		0–0	0–1	5–1	4–0	1–1	2–1	1–1	0–2	1–1	2–0	2–0	0–0	1–0	1–3	1–2
Kmita Zabierzów	1–1	1–2	1–2		2–3	0–0	1–0	1–1	1–1	0–0	1–1	0–1	2–0	0–1	2–0	1–1	1–0	0–1
Lechia Gdańsk	0–0	2–2	2–0	1–0		1–0	2–0	1–2	4–0	3–0	4–2	2–1	2–0	3–1	2–0	3–1	1–0	1–0
ŁKS Łomża	1–2	0–3	1–2	0–0	1–0		0–1	0–0	0–2	0–0	1–1	1–3	5–1	0–0	1–0	0–1	2–5	2–4
Motor Lublin	1–2	4–0	0–2	1–1	0–1	1–2		1–1	3–0	1–1	1–0	2–0	0–1	0–1	0–0	1–0	1–2	1–0
Odra Opole	0–2	1–1	3–1	1–0	2–3	0–2	0–2		2–0	1–0	1–2	1–1	0–0	0–0	0–1	1–0	3–1	0–1
Pelikan Łowicz	0–0	0–1	2–0	1–1	2–2	4–2	1–2	3–1		0–0	1–3	0–5	5–0	2–3	1–1	0–1	0–3	0–2
Piast Gliwice	3–1	1–2	2–0	3–0	3–0	2–1	3–2	2–0	4–1		0–0	1–0	2–0	1–1	5–1	2–2	1–1	0–1
Podbeskidzie Bielsko-Biała	0–1	2–1	2–0	3–2	1–1	2–0	3–0	1–0	2–0	0–1		1–0	0–1	3–0	2–0	2–1	4–0	1–0
Polonia Warsaw	1–2	2–0	3–1	0–0	3–1	2–1	2–0	2–0	2–2	0–1	0–2		2–1	1–0	3–1	0–0	4–0	1–0
Stal Stalowa Wola	0–1	3–0	1–0	3–1	2–2	0–1	1–0	1–0	0–0	0–2	0–3	3–0		1–1	1–0	2–0	2–0	0–2
Śląsk Wrocław	2–0	2–1	0–0	1–3	2–0	3–0	1–1	1–1	1–0	1–0	2–0	2–0	1–1		4–0	1–1	2–1	0–3
Tur Turek	1–4	2–0	1–1	2–1	2–0	0–2	2–3	0–3	0–2	0–1	0–0	2–0	1–0	1–1		0–0	0–3	0–0
Warta Poznań	0–0	3–0	0–1	1–0	1–2	0–2	3–3	2–0	2–1	0–1	0–2	0–0	1–1	2–3	0–3		1–1	2–1
Wisła Płock	1–1	2–3	2–1	1–0	2–2	4–1	3–1	2–0	0–0	0–0	3–2	1–1	4–1	0–4	1–1	3–1		0–2
Znicz Pruszków	2–2	4–2	0–0	4–0	1–2	3–1	3–0	2–0	2–2	1–2	0–0	3–2	1–1	0–1	1–0	1–1	3–1	

Source: 90minut.pl – II liga 2007/2008 (in Polish)
Legend: Blue = home team win; Yellow = draw; Red = away team win.

== Top goalscorers ==
Rank	Player	Club	Goals
1	(Poland) Robert Lewandowski	Znicz Pruszków	21
2	(Poland) Marcin Wachowicz	Arka Gdynia	20
3	(Poland) Sławomir Peszko	Wisła Płock	16
4	(Poland) Dariusz Kołodziej	Podbeskidzie Bielsko-Biała	14
5	(Poland) Daniel Koczon	Motor Lublin	13
5	(Poland) Przemysław Łudziński	Śląsk Wrocław	13
5	(Poland) Olgierd Moskalewicz	Arka Gdynia	13
8	(Poland) Maciej Rogalski	Lechia Gdańsk	11
8	(Poland) Robert Wilk	Pelikan Łowicz	11
8	(Poland) Bartosz Wiśniewski	Znicz Pruszków	11
12	(Poland) Paweł Buzała	Lechia Gdańsk	10
12	(Poland) Piotr Cetnarowicz	Lechia Gdańsk	10
12	(Poland) Hubert Jaromin	GKS Katowice	10
12	(Poland) Wojciech Kędziora	Piast Gliwice	10
12	(Slovakia) Martin Matúš	Podbeskidzie Bielsko-Biała	10
