= Jakub Zejglic =

Polish footballer

Personal information
- Date of birth: 18 May 1990 (age 36)
- Place of birth: Sławno, Poland
- Height: 1.74 m (5 ft 8 1/2 in)
- Position: Forward

Youth career
- Sława Sławno
- 2008–2010: Lechia Gdańsk

Senior career*
Years	Team	Apps	(Gls)
2009	→ Sława Sławno (loan)		
2009	→ Kaszubia Kościerzyna (loan)	15	(2)
2010–2011	Lechia Gdańsk	4	(0)
2010–2011	Lechia Gdańsk II	19	(3)
2011–2012	Bytovia Bytów	17	(1)
2012–2014	Concordia Elbląg	53	(8)
2014–2015	Gwardia Koszalin	26	(2)
2015–2016	Bałtyk Gdynia	26	(4)
2016–2023	Blomberger SV		
2023–2024	SV Werl-Aspe		
- * Club domestic league appearances and goals as of 17:08, 21 December 2024 (UTC)

Jakub Zejglic (born 18 May 1990) is a Polish footballer who plays as a forward.
