= Jakub Kawa =

Polish footballer

Personal information
- Date of birth: 1 October 1988 (age 38)
- Place of birth: Morąg, Poland
- Height: 1.82 m (6 ft 0 in)
- Position: Midfielder

Youth career
- Lechia Gdańsk

Senior career*
Years	Team	Apps	(Gls)
2004–2011	Lechia Gdańsk	7	(1)
2007	→ Kaszubia Kościerzyna (loan)		
2010	→ Znicz Pruszków (loan)	8	(0)
2010–2011	→ Bałtyk Gdynia (loan)	10	(1)
2011–2014	Lechia Gdańsk II	15	(1)
2016–2017	KP Sopot	13	(7)
2017–2021	AP Sopot	46+	(20+)
- * Club domestic league appearances and goals

Jakub Kawa (born 1 October 1988) is a Polish former professional footballer who played as a midfielder. He made his Ekstraklasa debut on 5 December 2008 against ŁKS Łódź, substituting Ben Starosta.

== Honours ==
Lechia Gdańsk

- III liga, group II: 2004–05

AP Sopot

- Klasa A Gdańsk I: 2018–19
- Klasa B Gdańsk II: 2017–18
