= Adam Duda =

Polish footballer (born 1991)

Personal information
- Full name: Adam Duda
- Date of birth: 29 April 1991 (age 35)
- Place of birth: Gdańsk, Poland
- Height: 1.88 m (6 ft 2 in)
- Position: Striker

Youth career
- Lechia Gdańsk

Senior career*
Years	Team	Apps	(Gls)
2009–2013	Lechia Gdańsk II	49	(21)
2012–2013	Lechia Gdańsk	26	(5)
2014	Chojniczanka Chojnice	14	(2)
2014	Widzew Łódź	14	(1)
2015–2016	Pogoń Siedlce	30	(7)
2016	Rozwój Katowice	9	(0)
2017	Concordia Elbląg	14	(4)
2017–2018	Bałtyk Gdynia	43	(20)
2019–2020	Concordia Elbląg	20	(13)
2020–2021	AS Pomorze Gdańsk	10	(32)
2021	Wda Lipusz	11	(8)
2021–2022	AS Pomorze Gdańsk	16	(26)
2022–2023	Gedania Gdańsk	45	(17)
2023–2025	Jaguar Gdańsk	31	(16)
- * Club domestic league appearances and goals as of 13:11, 20 June 2025 (UTC)

Adam Duda (born 29 April 1991) is a Polish professional footballer who plays as a striker.

== Honours ==
Concordia Elbląg

- IV liga Warmia-Masuria: 2018–19
- Polish Cup (Warmia-Masuria regionals): 2018–19

Gedania Gdańsk

- IV liga Pomerania: 2021–22
