= Damian Szuprytowski =

Polish footballer

Personal information
- Full name: Damian Szuprytowski
- Date of birth: 25 June 1989 (age 37)
- Place of birth: Malbork, Poland
- Height: 1.72 m (5 ft 7 1/2 in)
- Position: Attacking midfielder

Team information
- Current team: Pogoń Siedlce
- Number: 7

Youth career
- Pomezania Malbork
- 2006–2010: Lechia Gdańsk

Senior career*
Years	Team	Apps	(Gls)
2007–2012	Lechia Gdańsk II	35	(9)
2010–2012	Lechia Gdańsk	4	(0)
2011	→ Górnik Polkowice (loan)	8	(0)
2012–2013	Concordia Elbląg	52	(5)
2014	Świt Nowy Dwór Mazowiecki	15	(2)
2014–2018	Olimpia Elbląg	112	(22)
2018–2019	Radomiak Radom	30	(5)
2019	→ Olimpia Elbląg (loan)	13	(0)
2019–2020	Olimpia Elbląg	19	(8)
2020–2022	Radunia Stężyca	55	(7)
2022–	Pogoń Siedlce	113	(7)
- * Club domestic league appearances and goals as of 19:44, 26 May 2026 (UTC)

Damian Szuprytowski (born 25 June 1989) is a Polish professional footballer who plays as an attacking midfielder for and captains I liga club Pogoń Siedlce.

== Football ==
=== Lechia Gdańsk ===
Born in Malbork Szuprytowski started his footballing trade with the youth levels of Pomezania Malbork. He joined the Lechia Gdańsk academy set up in 2006, quickly finding himself playing in the Młoda Ekstraklasa, the highest division in the Under 21's league. In total, he played 34 times for Lechia in the youth leagues. His first break at the professional leagues was with the Lechia Gdańsk II team playing in the IV liga, and making his debut against Wietcisa Skarszewy. His debut in the Ekstraklasa came later that year, coming off the bench against Lech Poznań on 28 April 2010. Despite the promise of big things, Szuprytowski went on to make a total of four appearances for the first team, with his only start coming in his last appearance for the first team, in a 2–1 home defeat to Jagiellonia Białystok. Szuprytowski was contracted to the club for two more seasons but failed to make a first team appearance again, playing for the second team and spending time on loan at Górnik Polkowice in the I liga where he managed to make eight appearances.

=== Lower divisions ===
Szuprytowski's left Lechia in 2012, having a relatively successful 18-month spell with Concordia Elbląg. He played consistently with Concordia in the II liga, playing a total of 52 times for the club. During the January transfer window, he joined Świt Nowy Dwór Mazowiecki, playing 15 times for Świt. A reshuffling of the leagues after the 2013–14 season saw 10 teams being relegated from both the East and West divisions, seeing both clubs Szuprytowski played for that season being relegated as the bottom two teams. After relegation, he joined Olimpia Elbląg, spending the next four seasons with the club. In his first season, the team finished 2nd in their group in the III liga, winning their group the following season. The 2016–17 season proved to be a successful one for Olimpia, finishing one place outside of the playoffs in 5th, consolidating their place in the league the season after finishing in 6th. Despite having a successful time with Olimpia, in which he made over 100 appearances, he moved to join Radomiak Radom during the summer transfer window. The season started well for Radomiak and Szuprytowski, with the latter making 16 appearances and scoring four goals before the winter break. During the break, Szuprytowski moved back on loan to Olimpia Elbląg. Despite the move away from Radomiak, his contribution helped the team to win the league. After the season, Szuprytowski returned to Olimpia Elbląg on a permanent basis.

== Honours ==
Olimpia Elbląg

- III liga Podlaskie–Warmia-Masuria: 2015–16

Radomiak Radom

- II liga: 2018–19

Radunia Stężyca

- III liga, group II: 2020–21

Pogoń Siedlce

- II liga: 2023–24

Individual

- Polish Union of Footballers' II liga Team of the Season: 2023–24
