= Alyaksandr Sazankow =

Belarusian footballer

Aleksandr Sazankov
Personal information
- Date of birth: 8 March 1984 (age 42)
- Place of birth: Mogilev, Belarusian SSR, Soviet Union
- Height: 1.81 m (5 ft 11 1/2 in)
- Position: Forward

Youth career
- 2000–2002: Dnepr-Transmash Mogilev

Senior career*
Years	Team	Apps	(Gls)
2000	Dnepr-2 Mogilev	11	(6)
2002–2009	Dnepr Mogilev	86	(22)
2010	Dinamo Minsk	22	(5)
2010–2012	Lechia Gdańsk	10	(1)
2011	Lechia Gdańsk II	2	(0)
2012–2017	Dnepr Mogilev	82	(13)
2017	Orsha	12	(1)
2018–2019	Gorki	19	(2)
2019	Orsha	6	(0)
2023	Kostyukovichi	2	(0)

International career
2002	Belarus U21	2	(0)
- * Club domestic league appearances and goals

Aleksandr Sazankov (Belarusian: Аляксандр Сазанкоў; Russian: Александр Сазанков; born 8 March 1984) is a Belarusian former professional footballer who played as a forward.
