= Bartosz Kaniecki =

Polish footballer

Personal information
- Full name: Bartosz Kaniecki
- Date of birth: 11 July 1988 (age 38)
- Place of birth: Łódź, Poland
- Height: 1.96 m (6 ft 5 in)
- Position: Goalkeeper

Youth career
- 2003–2007: Widzew Łódź

Senior career*
Years	Team	Apps	(Gls)
2007–2011	Widzew Łódź	11	(0)
2010	→ Concordia Piotrków Tryb. (loan)	13	(0)
2012–2014	Lechia Gdańsk	9	(0)
2012	→ Bałtyk Gdynia (loan)	7	(0)
2012–2014	Lechia Gdańsk II	8	(0)
2015–2017	Wisła Płock	1	(0)
2018	Unia Solec Kujawski	0	(0)
2018–2021	Sokół Aleksandrów Łódzki	59	(0)
2021–2022	RKS Radomsko	7	(0)
Total		115	(0)
- * Club domestic league appearances and goals

Bartosz Kaniecki (born 11 July 1988) is a Polish former professional footballer who played as a goalkeeper.

== Career ==
He is trainee of Widzew Łódź. In the winter of 2010, he was loaned to Concordia Piotrków Trybunalski. He returned half a year later.
