= Paweł Buzała =

Polish footballer

Personal information
- Full name: Paweł Buzała
- Date of birth: 27 December 1985 (age 40)
- Place of birth: Złotów, Poland
- Height: 1.68 m (5 ft 6 in)
- Position: Forward

Youth career
- Sparta Złotów
- Darzbór Szczecinek
- Sparta Złotów

Senior career*
Years	Team	Apps	(Gls)
2003–2006	Lech Poznań	12	(1)
2006–2010	Lechia Gdańsk	114	(26)
2009–2010	Lechia Gdańsk II	2	(3)
2011–2012	GKS Bełchatów	36	(8)
2013–2014	Lechia Gdańsk	29	(6)
2013–2014	Lechia Gdańsk II	6	(0)
2014–2016	Górnik Łęczna	7	(0)
2015	→ Bytovia Bytów (loan)	7	(0)
2016	KS Lublinianka	11	(0)
2017	KTS-K Luzino		
- * Club domestic league appearances and goals

Paweł Buzała (born 27 December 1985) is a Polish former professional footballer who played as a forward.

== Career ==
He is a former player of Lech Poznań. He joined Lechia Gdańsk after he left Lech Poznań.

In February 2011, he signed a three-year contract with GKS Bełchatów.

== Honours ==
Lechia Gdańsk

- II liga: 2007–08

KTS-K Luzino

- Regional league Gdańsk I: 2016–17

Individual

- Polish Cup top scorer: 2007–08
