= Marko Bajić =

Serbian footballer

Personal information
- Date of birth: 29 September 1985 (age 41)
- Place of birth: Belgrade, SFR Yugoslavia
- Height: 1.83 m (6 ft 0 in)
- Position: Central midfielder

Youth career
- ČSK Čelarevo
- Milicionar
- Partizan

Senior career*
Years	Team	Apps	(Gls)
2004–2007	Modriča	84	(9)
2008–2009	Górnik Zabrze	23	(1)
2009–2013	Lechia Gdańsk	58	(2)
2009–2012	Lechia Gdańsk II	7	(3)
2013–2014	Al-Madina		
2014	Górnik Łęczna	0	(0)
2014–2015	Bytovia Bytów	15	(1)
2015	OFK Bačka	1	(0)
2016	Mladost Velika Obarska		
2016	Borac Bobota-Agrar		
2017–2018	Budućnost Mladenovo		
2020–2021	Sloga Plandiste		
- * Club domestic league appearances and goals

Marko Bajić (Serbian Cyrillic: Марко Бајић; born 28 September 1985) is a Serbian former professional footballer who played as a midfielder.
