= Kamil Poźniak =

Polish footballer (born 1989)

Personal information
- Date of birth: 11 December 1989 (age 36)
- Place of birth: Krasnystaw, Poland
- Height: 1.82 m (6 ft 0 in)
- Position: Midfielder

Senior career*
Years	Team	Apps	(Gls)
- Jedynka Krasnystaw
2004–2006	Start Krasnystaw		
2006–2007	Avia Świdnik		
2007–2010	GKS Bełchatów (ME)	43	(6)
2008–2010	GKS Bełchatów	25	(0)
2011–2012	Lechia Gdańsk	16	(0)
2012–2013	ŁKS Łódź	7	(1)
2013–2015	GKS Bełchatów	39	(3)
2015–2017	Górnik Łęczna	7	(1)
2017–2018	Gwardia Koszalin	22	(1)
2018	Puszcza Niepołomice	4	(0)
2019	Motor Lublin	14	(0)
2019–2021	Greifswalder FC	22	(11)
2021–2024	Flota Świnoujście	99	(36)

International career
2008–2010	Poland U21	3	(0)
2010	Poland U23	1	(0)
- * Club domestic league appearances and goals as of 14:40, 4 July 2024 (UTC)

Kamil Poźniak (born 11 December 1989) is a Polish professional footballer who plays as a midfielder.

== Club career ==
Poźniak was born in Krasnystaw. In 2006, he joined Avia Świdnik, which he left after a year to join GKS Bełchatów. He made his professional debut for GKS Bełchatów in an Ekstraklasa match against Lech Poznań on 8 August 2008.

In February 2011, he signed five-year contract with Lechia Gdańsk.

== International career ==
Poźniak was a part of Poland U21 national team.

== Honours ==
GKS Bełchatów

- I liga: 2013–14

Motor Lublin

- Polish Cup (Lublin subdistrict regionals): 2018–19

Flota Świnoujście

- IV liga West Pomerania: 2022–23
