= Deleu (footballer, born 1984) =

Brazilian footballer (born 1984)

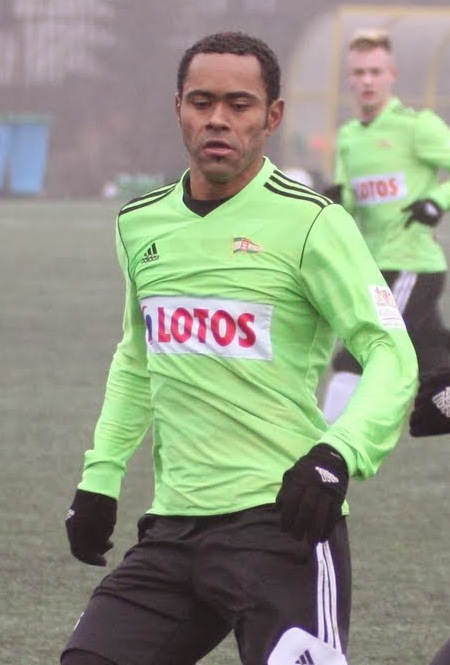
- Deleu with Lechia Gdańsk in 2014

Personal information
- Full name: Luiz Carlos Santos
- Date of birth: 1 March 1984 (age 42)
- Place of birth: Penedo, Brazil
- Height: 1.76 m (5 ft 9 1/2 in)
- Position: Right back

Team information
- Current team: AS Kolbudy; Gedania Gdańsk U19 (manager)
- Number: 55

Youth career
- SC Penedense

Senior career*
Years	Team	Apps	(Gls)
2005	AA Coruripe		
2006	Corinthians Alagoano		
2006	AD Confiança		
2007	Nautico	13	(0)
2008	CSA		
2008	Ceará		
2009	Mirassol		
2009	Treze FC		
2009–2010	CA Metropolitano		
2010–2014	Lechia Gdańsk	98	(3)
2014–2018	Cracovia	80	(3)
2018	Miedź Legnica	1	(0)
2018–2019	Chojniczanka Chojnice	7	(0)
2019–2021	Bytovia Bytów	48	(0)
2021–2024	Jaguar Gdańsk	82	(3)
2025–2026	Tylko Lechia Gdańsk	23	(1)
2026–	AS Kolbudy	6	(0)

Managerial career
- 2021–2025: Jaguar Gdańsk (youth)
- 2025–: Gedania Gdańsk U19 (manager)
- * Club domestic league appearances and goals as of 17:44, 30 June 2026 (UTC)

Luiz Carlos Santos or simply Deleu (born 1 March 1984) is a Brazilian footballer who plays as a defender for regional league club Akademia Sportu Kolbudy. He also works as a youth coach for Gedania Gdańsk.

== Career ==
In July 2010, he signed a two-year contract with the Polish Ekstraklasa side Lechia Gdańsk. He played there for four seasons, until the end of the 2013–14 season. On 5 August 2014, he signed a two-year contract with Cracovia. On 9 January 2018, he terminated the contract with Cracovia. On 17 February 2018, he signed a six-month contract with Miedź Legnica, where he played only one league match.

In the following years, he represented the colors of Chojniczanka Chojnice and Bytovia Bytów. In January 2021, he terminated the contract with Bytovia and became a Jaguar Gdańsk player. At the same time, he started working as a junior coach at the club's academy.

== Honours ==
Miedź Legnica

- I liga: 2017–18
