= Jakub Popielarz =

Polish footballer

Personal information
- Full name: Jakub Popielarz
- Date of birth: 16 March 1990 (age 36)
- Place of birth: Dukla, Poland
- Height: 1.76 m (5 ft 9 1/2 in)
- Position: Midfielder

Team information
- Current team: Poland U18 (assistant coach); FASE (sporting director)

Youth career
- Krośnianka Krosno
- 2004–2005: Stal Mielec

Senior career*
Years	Team	Apps	(Gls)
2006–2009	Stal Mielec		
2009	Karpaty Krosno	15	(1)
2010–2011	Lechia Gdańsk (ME)	10	(0)
2010–2013	Lechia Gdańsk II	21	(1)
2010–2013	Lechia Gdańsk	5	(0)
2012–2013	→ Stal Stalowa Wola (loan)	14	(0)
2014–2015	Karpaty Krosno	48	(2)
2016–2018	Start Rymanów		
2019	Iskra Iskrzynia	3	(0)
- * Club domestic league appearances and goals

Jakub Popielarz (born 16 March 1990) is a Polish former professional footballer who played as a midfielder who is currently the assistant coach of the Poland national under-18 team and the sporting director of Polish academy FASE. He was the director of Cracovia's academy from February 2023 to August 2024.

== Career ==
In the winter of 2010, he moved from Karpaty Krosno to Ekstraklasa club Lechia Gdańsk.

== Honours ==
Start Rymanów

- Klasa A Krosno I: 2016–17
