= Abdou Razack Traoré =

Burkinabé footballer

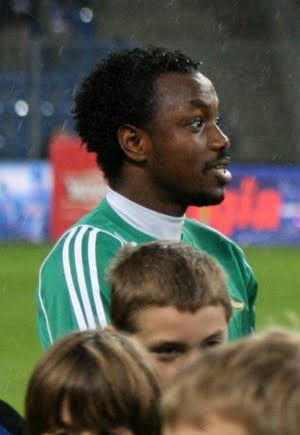
- Traoré with Lechia Gdańsk in 2010

Personal information
- Full name: Abdou Razack Traoré
- Date of birth: 28 December 1988 (age 37)
- Place of birth: Abidjan, Ivory Coast
- Height: 1.70 m (5 ft 7 in)
- Positions: Forward; attacking midfielder

Youth career
- Excellence FC

Senior career*
Years	Team	Apps	(Gls)
2005–2006	Raja Casablanca		
2006–2010	Rosenborg	51	(3)
2010	→ Lechia Gdańsk (loan)	12	(5)
2011–2012	Lechia Gdańsk	52	(20)
2013–2014	Gaziantepspor	37	(10)
2014–2017	Karabükspor	42	(17)
2015–2016	→ Konyaspor (loan)	30	(7)
2017–2019	Konyaspor	22	(0)
2019–2020	Sivasspor	9	(0)
2020	→ Bursaspor (loan)	14	(4)
2020–2021	Giresunspor	26	(3)
2021–2022	Nantong Zhiyun	45	(15)
2023	Nanjing City	12	(3)
2024	ISCA		

International career
2011–2021	Burkina Faso	49	(4)
Medal record
Representing Burkina Faso
Africa Cup of Nations
Runner-up	2013 South Africa
Third place	2017 Gabon
- * Club domestic league appearances and goals as of 27 December 2024

Abdou Razack Traoré (born 28 December 1988) is a professional footballer who plays as a forward or an attacking midfielder. Born in Ivory Coast, he represented Burkina Faso at international level.

== Club career ==
=== Rosenborg ===
Traoré was born in Abidjan, the Ivory Coast. He played for Raja Casablanca before he ended his contract and joined Rosenborg on a free transfer a few months later. At Rosenborg, he plays alongside his compatriot and Ivory Coast international Didier Ya Konan, who joined the club in December 2006 from homeland club ASEC Abidjan. In August 2007, it was reported by Norwegian newspapers that Traoré was beat up and robbed while being on vacation in Ivory Coast.

In the November 2007 issue of World Soccer he was featured on their list of the 50 most exciting teenagers in world football.

=== Violent episode ===
On 24 October 2008, it became known that Traoré knocked down fellow Rosenborg player Øyvind Storflor during a practice session. The following day Rosenborg announced that Traoré would be banned from playing the last two matches of the season. Traoré's contract would run out at the end of 2010 and his last year in Rosenborg was difficult with little amount of playing time. Rosenborg's Chief of Football Erik Hoftun stated "We thank Abdou for his spell at the club. Unfortunately, he didn't develop as much as we expected, but we wish him good luck in the future" after his departure from the Norwegian champions.

=== Lechia Gdańsk ===
On 20 August 2010, Traoré joined Polish Ekstraklasa club Lechia Gdańsk on loan. On 28 August, he made his debut in a league match against Śląsk Wrocław. On 21 September, he scored his first goal in a cup match against Górnik Zabrze. Four days later, he scored his first and second goal in a league game against Górnik Zabrze.

=== Gaziantepspor ===
On 15 January 2013, Traoré joined Turkish Süper Lig club Gaziantepspor on a free transfer.

=== Sivasspor ===
On 31 August 2019, he has signed 1+1 year contract with Sivasspor.

=== Nanjing City ===
On 1 July 2023, Traoré joined China League One side Nanjing City.

== International career ==
Traoré made his national debut for Burkina Faso against Namibia on 27 March 2011.

== Personal life ==
The Abidjan born Traoré holds a Burkinabè passport as his parents are from Burkina Faso.

== Career statistics ==
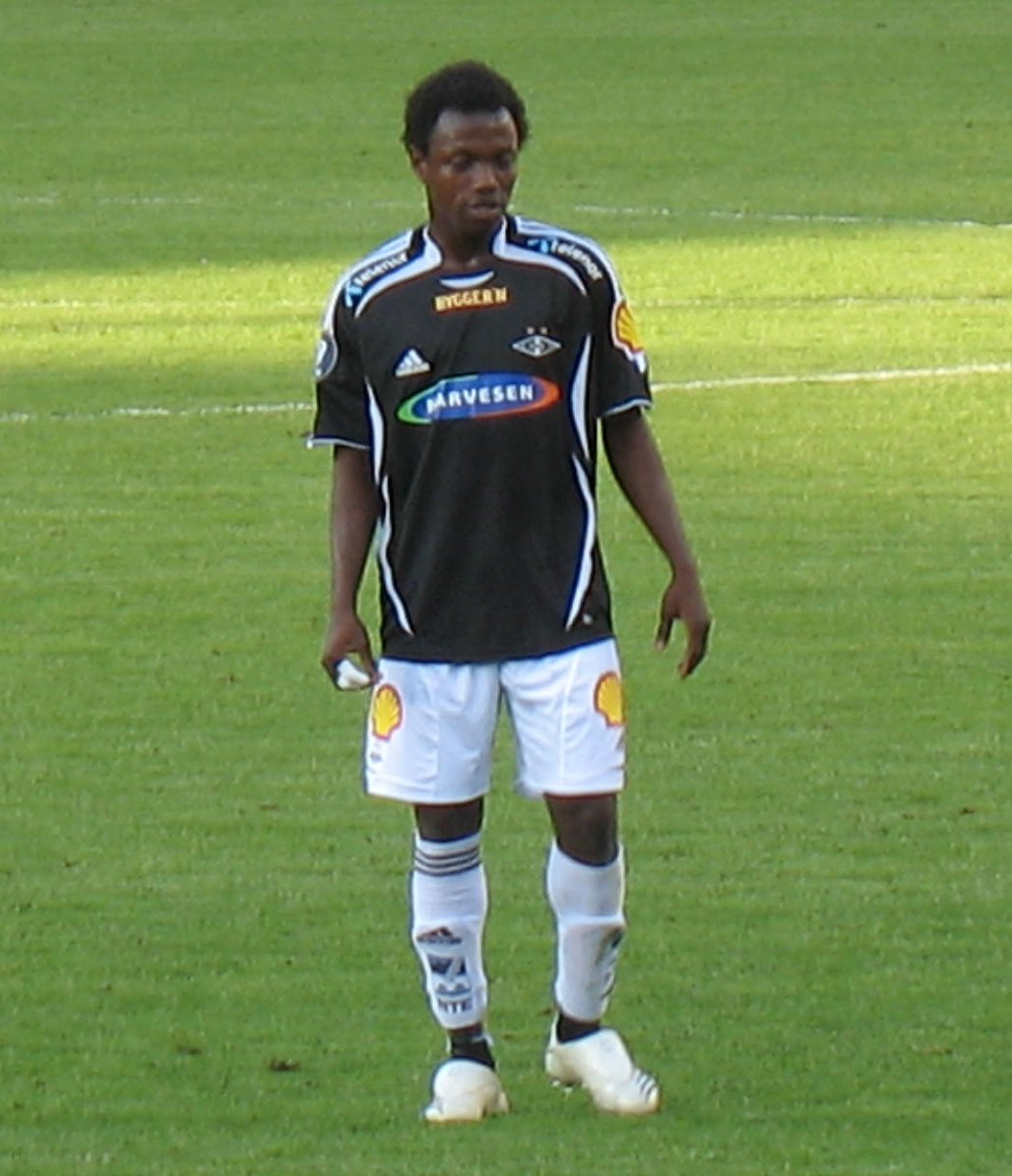
Traoré playing for Rosenborg in 2007

=== Club ===
As of match played 28 October 2023

Appearances and goals by club, season and competition
Club	Season	League			National cup (Note: Includes Norwegian Cup, Polish Cup, Turkish Cup, Chinese FA Cup)		Continental		Other		Total	
Club	Season	Division	Apps	Goals	Apps	Goals	Apps	Goals	Apps	Goals	Apps	Goals
Rosenborg	2007	Tippeligaen	18	1	4	0	9 (Note: Appearance(s) in UEFA Champions League)	3	—		31	4
Rosenborg	2008	Tippeligaen	15	1	1	0	7 (Note: Six appearances in UEFA Cup, one appearance in UEFA Intertoto Cup)	0	—		23	1
Rosenborg	2009	Tippeligaen	10	1	1	0	2 (Note: Appearances in UEFA Europa League)	0	—		13	1
Rosenborg	2010	Tippeligaen	8	0	3	1	1	0	—		12	1
Rosenborg	Total		51	3	9	1	19	3	—		79	7
Lechia Gdańsk	2010–11	Ekstraklasa	27	12	6	1	—		—		33	13
Lechia Gdańsk	2011–12	Ekstraklasa	24	4	0	0	—		—		24	4
Lechia Gdańsk	2012–13	Ekstraklasa	13	9	2	1	—		—		15	10
Lechia Gdańsk	Total		64	25	8	2	—		—		72	27
Gaziantepspor	2012–13	Süper Lig	11	2	0	0	—		—		11	2
Gaziantepspor	2013–14	Süper Lig	26	8	1	0	—		—		27	8
Gaziantepspor	Total		37	10	1	0	—		—		38	10
Karabükspor	2014–15	Süper Lig	25	10	4	2	4	0	—		33	12
Karabükspor	2016–17	Süper Lig	17	7	0	0	—		—		17	7
Karabükspor	Total		42	17	4	2	4	0	—		50	19
Konyaspor (loan)	2015–16	Süper Lig	30	7	5	0	—		—		35	7
Konyaspor	2017–18	Süper Lig	1	0	0	0	—		1 (Note: Appearance in Turkish Super Cup)	1	2	1
Konyaspor	2018–19	Süper Lig	21	0	2	1	—		—		23	1
Konyaspor	Total		22	0	2	1	—		1	1	25	2
Sivasspor	2019–20	Süper Lig	9	0	4	2	—		—		13	2
Bursaspor (loan)	2019–20	TFF First League	14	4	4	2	—		2	0	20	6
Giresunspor	2020–21	TFF First League	26	3	2	0	—		—		28	3
Nantong Zhiyun	2021	China League One	16	6	1	0	—		—		17	6
Nantong Zhiyun	2022	China League One	29	9	0	0	—		—		29	9
Nantong Zhiyun	Total		45	15	1	0	—		—		46	15
Nanjing City	2023	China League One	12	3	0	0	—		—		12	3
Career total			352	87	40	9	23	3	3	1	418	101

=== International ===
As of 27 December 2023

Appearances and goals by national team and year
National team	Year	Apps	Goals
Burkina Faso	2011	8	1
Burkina Faso	2012	5	0
Burkina Faso	2013	8	2
Burkina Faso	2014	3	0
Burkina Faso	2015	1	0
Burkina Faso	2016	5	0
Burkina Faso	2017	7	0
Burkina Faso	2018	4	1
Burkina Faso	2019	2	0
Burkina Faso	2020	4	0
Burkina Faso	2021	1	0
Total		49	4

Scores and results list Burkina Faso's goal tally first, score column indicates score after each Traoré goal.

List of international goals scored by Abdou Razack Traoré
No.	Date	Venue	Opponent	Score	Result	Competition
1	4 June 2011	Independence Stadium, Windhoek, Namibia	Namibia	1–0	4–1	2012 Africa Cup of Nations qualification
2	17 January 2013	Mbombela Stadium, Mbombela, South Africa	Eswatini	2–0	3–0	Friendly
3	14 August 2013	Stade Ibn Batouta, Tangier, Morocco	Morocco	2–0	2–1	Friendly
4	13 October 2018	Stade du 4 Août, Ouagadougou, Burkina Faso	Botswana	3–0	3–0	2019 Africa Cup of Nations qualification

== Honours ==
Rosenborg

- Tippeligaen: 2009, 2010
- Superfinalen: 2010

Konyaspor

- Turkish Super Cup: 2017

Individual

- Ekstraklasa Player of the Month: October 2012
