= Paweł Nowak =

Polish footballer

Personal information
- Full name: Paweł Nowak
- Date of birth: 27 January 1979 (age 47)
- Place of birth: Kraków, Poland
- Height: 1.73 m (5 ft 8 in)
- Position: Midfielder

Senior career*
Years	Team	Apps	(Gls)
1996–1999	Wisła Kraków II		
1997–2003	Wisła Kraków	25	(0)
1999–2000	→ Hutnik Kraków (loan)		
2000–2002	→ Proszowianka (loan)		
2002–2003	→ Cracovia (loan)	30	(13)
2003–2009	Cracovia	151	(20)
2009–2013	Lechia Gdańsk	80	(7)
2013	Sandecja Nowy Sącz	15	(1)
2013–2014	Garbarnia Kraków	38	(6)
2014–2015	Poroniec Poronin	27	(10)
2016	Wiślanka Grabie	27	(9)

Managerial career
- 2018: Czarni Staniątki
- 2018–2020: Sandecja Nowy Sącz (assistant)
- 2021: Watra Białka Tatrzańska
- 2021: Unia Tarnów
- * Club domestic league appearances and goals

Paweł Nowak (born 27 January 1979) is a Polish professional football manager and former player.

== Honours ==
Wisła Kraków

- Ekstraklasa: 1998–99
