= Tur Turek =

Polish football club

- Full name: Miejsko-Gminny Klub Sportowy; Tur 1921 Turek
- Founded: 6 July 1921; 103 years ago 2015; 10 years ago (refounded)
- Ground: Stadion 1000-lecia
- Capacity: 2,115
- Chairman: Artur Poszwa
- Manager: Maciej Maliński
- League: Regional league Greater Poland VI
- 2023–24: Regional league Greater Poland VI, 10th of 16
- Website: http://tur1921.pl
| Home colours | Away colours |

Tur Turek (Polish pronunciation: [ˈtur ˈturɛk]) is a Polish football club based in Turek, Poland.

After reformation in 2015, the club (Polish pronunciation: [ˈtur ˈturɛk]) won three promotions in a row, however fell into financial trouble in February 2020 and the senior team was withdrawn from the fifth division; the whole youth team structure however has remained intact and continues to operate.

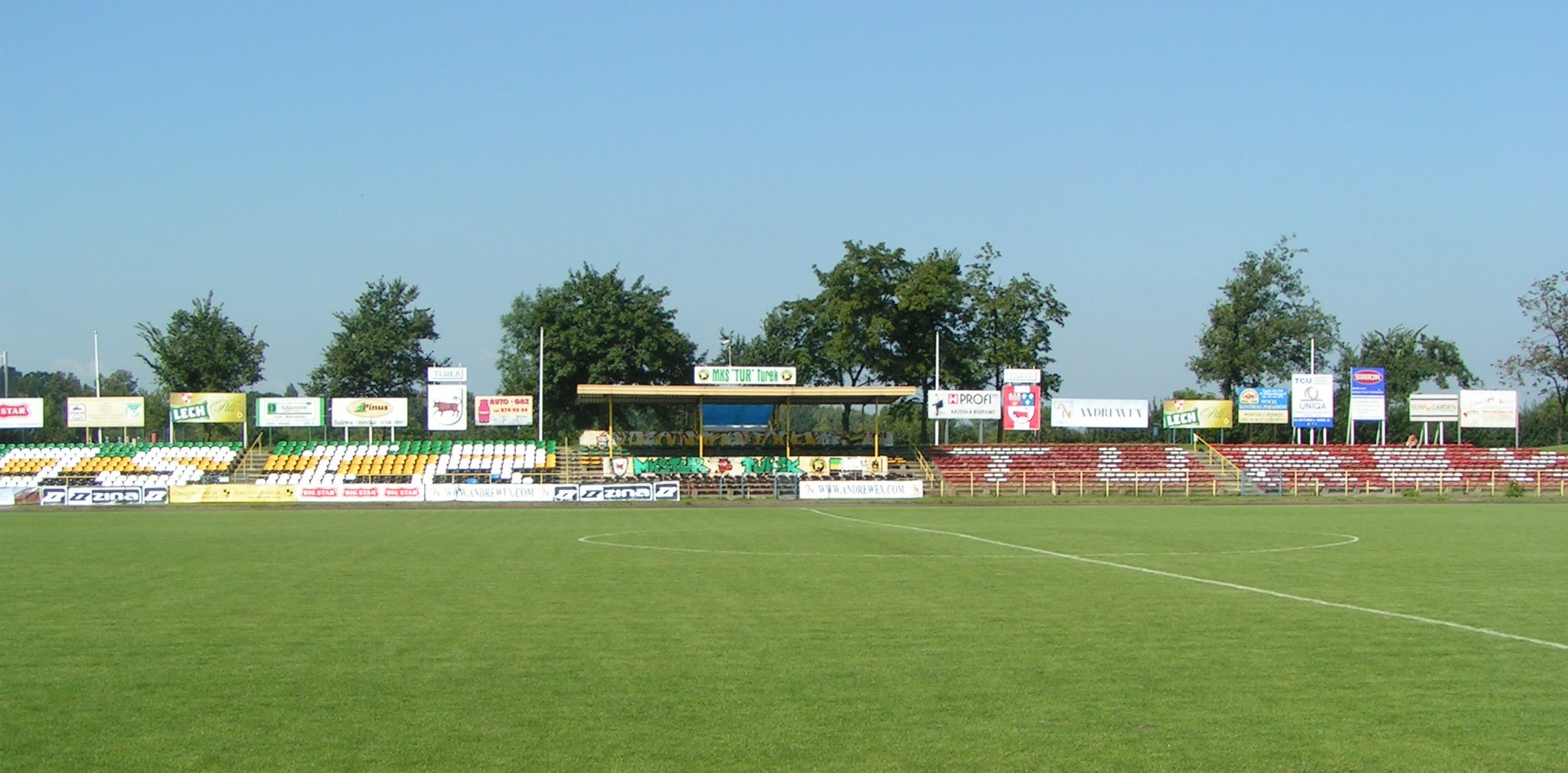
Ground: Stadion 1000-lecia
