= Sebastian Małkowski =

Polish footballer (born 1987)

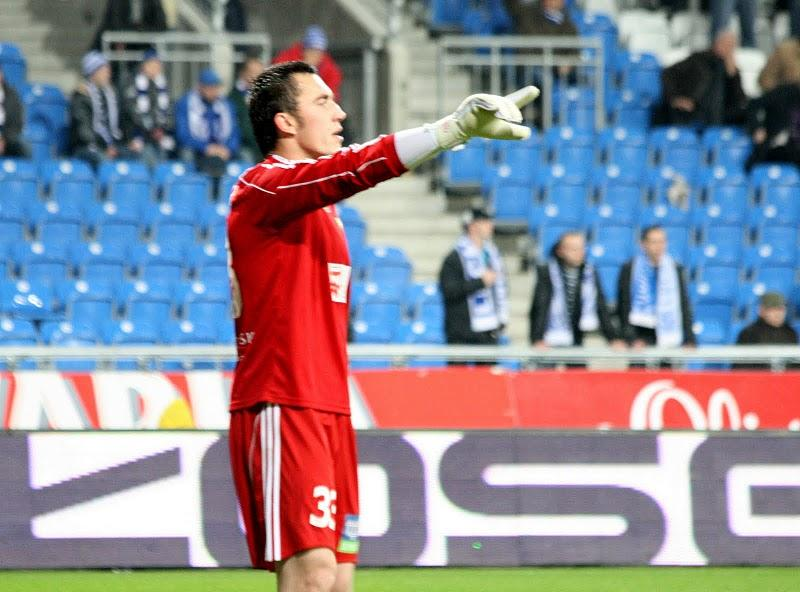

Personal information
- Full name: Sebastian Małkowski
- Date of birth: 2 March 1987 (age 39)
- Place of birth: Tczew, Poland
- Height: 1.92 m (6 ft 3 1/2 in)
- Position: Goalkeeper

Team information
- Current team: Wombwell Town

Youth career
- 2003–2005: Wisła Tczew

Senior career*
Years	Team	Apps	(Gls)
2005–2006	Wisła Tczew		
2006–2008	Olimpia Sztum		
2010–2014	Lechia Gdańsk	36	(0)
2014–2015	Bytovia Bytów	7	(0)
2015	Zawisza Bydgoszcz	0	(0)
2015–2018	Frickley Athletic	70	(0)
2018	Wombwell Town	3	(0)
2018–2019	Boston United	4	(0)
2019	Belper Town	4	(0)
2019	Wombwell Town	1	(0)
2021–2025	Worksop Town	89	(0)
2024	→ Bridlington Town (loan)	13	(0)
2025–	Wombwell Town	0	(0)

International career
2011	Poland	1	(0)
- * Club domestic league appearances and goals as of 17:27, 25 November 2024 (UTC)

Sebastian Małkowski (born 2 March 1987) is a Polish professional footballer who plays as a goalkeeper for Wombwell Town.

He is a former Poland international who earned a single cap in 2011. He notably played in the Ekstraklasa for Lechia Gdańsk and Zawisza Bydgoszcz, as well as for Olimpia Sztum, Wisła Tczew and Bytovia Bytów. In 2015 he emigrated to England and began playing semi-professional football for Frickley Athletic, Wombwell Town, Belper Town and Boston United.

== Club career ==
He played in the Ekstraklasa for Lechia Gdańsk and Zawisza Bydgoszcz, as well as for Wisła Tczew and Bytovia Bytów.

In January 2018, Małkowski suffered an anterior cruciate ligament injury. His contract with Frickley Athletic expired in May 2018, and on 19 October after getting fit from his injury, he joined Boston United. Before he signed, he played three matches for Barnsley-based Wombwell Town in September 2018. He played one game for the club again in January 2019.

In February 2019, Małkowski joined Belper Town on a dual registration.

In 2022, he signed for Worksop Town.

== International career ==
Małkowski was called up to the Poland squad and played in a 2–0 defeat against Lithuania, playing the full 90 minutes.

== Honours ==
Worksop Town

- Northern Premier League: 2022–23
