= Krzysztof Bąk =

Polish footballer (born 1982)

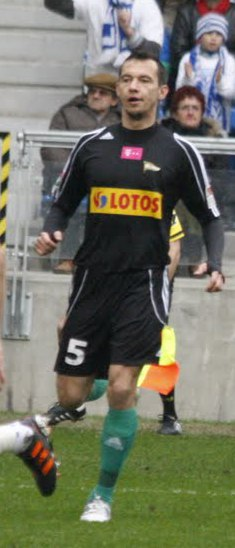
- Bąk with Lechia Gdańsk in 2012

Personal information
- Date of birth: 22 June 1982 (age 44)
- Place of birth: Warsaw, Poland
- Height: 1.88 m (6 ft 2 in)
- Position: Defender

Team information
- Current team: Gedania Gdańsk
- Number: 5

Senior career*
Years	Team	Apps	(Gls)
2001–2002	Polonia Warsaw II		
2003–2009	Polonia Warsaw	119	(7)
2009–2014	Lechia Gdańsk	106	(4)
2012–2014	Lechia Gdańsk II	6	(0)
2014–2021	Bytovia Bytów	146	(7)
2021–	Gedania Gdańsk	89	(3)
- * Club domestic league appearances and goals as of 21:08, 25 June 2026 (UTC)

Krzysztof Bąk (born 22 June 1982) is a Polish professional footballer who plays as a defender for III liga club Gedania Gdańsk.

== Career ==
In January 2010, he joined Lechia Gdańsk on a three-year contract.

== Honours ==
Gedania Gdańsk

- IV liga Pomerania: 2021–22, 2025–26
