= Łukasz Surma =

Polish footballer (born 1977)

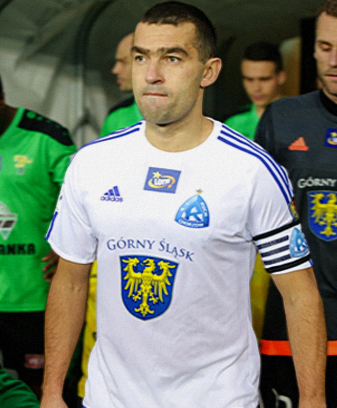
- Surma with Ruch Chorzów in 2016

Personal information
- Date of birth: 28 June 1977 (age 49)
- Place of birth: Kraków, Poland
- Height: 1.77 m (5 ft 10 in)
- Position: Midfielder

Team information
- Current team: Poland U18 (manager)

Senior career*
| Years | Team | Apps | (Gls) |
| 1994–1998 | Wisła Kraków | 70 | (1) |
| 1998–2002 | Ruch Chorzów | 117 | (6) |
| 2002–2007 | Legia Warsaw | 123 | (8) |
| 2007–2008 | Maccabi Haifa | 1 | (0) |
| 2007–2008 | → Bnei Sakhnin (loan) | 30 | (0) |
| 2008–2009 | Admira Wacker | 6 | (0) |
| 2009–2013 | Lechia Gdańsk | 125 | (6) |
| 2013–2017 | Ruch Chorzów | 144 | (5) |
| 2018 | Watra Białka Tatrzańska | 14 | (1) |
| Total | | 630 | (27) |

International career
| 1999 | Poland U21 | 2 | (0) |
| 2002–2003 | Poland | 5 | (0) |

Managerial career
- 2018: Watra Białka Tatrzańska (player-manager)
- 2018–2019: Soła Oświęcim
- 2019–2021: Garbarnia Kraków
- 2021–2022: Piast Żmigród
- 2022–2023: Stal Stalowa Wola
- 2023–2024: Sandecja Nowy Sącz
- 2024–2025: Pogoń-Sokół Lubaczów
- 2026–: Poland U18
- * Club domestic league appearances and goals

Łukasz Surma (born 28 June 1977) is a Polish professional football manager and former player who is currently in charge of the Poland national under-18 team.

He holds the record for the most appearances in Ekstraklasa history, with 559 games played for Wisła Kraków, Ruch Chorzów, Legia Warsaw and Lechia Gdańsk.

== Club career ==
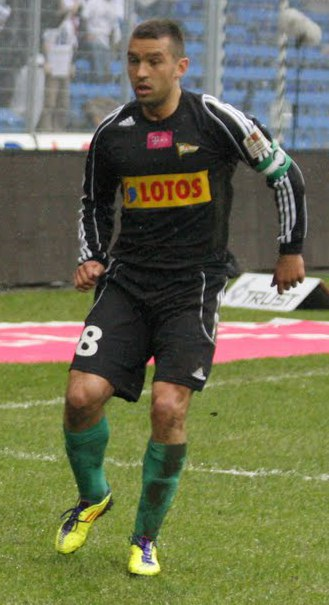
Surma in 2012 with Lechia Gdańsk

He was a captain of Legia Warsaw for four years, with whom he won the 2005–06 league title. In the past years he played for clubs like Ruch Chorzów and Wisła Kraków.

On 5 July 2007, Łukasz Surma signed for Israeli side Maccabi Haifa. He was loaned to Bnei Sakhnin where he was a regular starter, helping the team finish in 3rd place.

== International career ==
Surma has appeared five times for the Poland national team.

== Managerial career ==
=== Stal Stalowa Wola ===
On 23 March 2022, Surma was appointed the successor of Łukasz Bereta at Stal Stalowa Wola. In his debut on 27 March 2022, "Stalówka" led by him lost 1–0 to Podlasie Biała Podlaska. The team from Stalowa Wola finished the 2021–22 season in 7th place. On 21 June 2022, led by Surma, Stal won 3–0 against Karpaty Krosno in the final of the Subcarpathian Polish Cup.

Despite media rumors of his departure after the season, Surma continued working in the 2022–23 season. At the inauguration of the new campaign, Stal lost 4–2 in a league game against Cracovia II. He was fired on 21 March 2023. At the time of his departure, Stal was in third place in the league, with a point loss to leader Wieczysta Kraków.

=== Sandecja Nowy Sącz ===
On 15 August 2023, he was announced as the new manager of II liga club Sandecja Nowy Sącz, who at the time were placed bottom of the table and had just crashed out of the Polish Cup preliminary round. He left the team on 5 January 2024, with a record of four wins, four draws and seven losses.

=== Pogoń-Sokół Lubaczów ===
Surma returned to managing on 14 December 2024, taking charge of III liga club Pogoń-Sokół Lubaczów. On 4 May 2025, he was dismissed following a 1–6 defeat against Siarka Tarnobrzeg the day prior.

=== Poland U18 ===
On 23 June 2026, Surma was appointed by the Polish Football Association to manage the Poland national under-18 team.

== Managerial statistics ==
As of match played 16 November 2026

Managerial record by team and tenure
| Team | From | To | Record | | | | | | | |
| Team | From | To | G | W | D | L | GF | GA | GD | Win % |
|---|---|---|---|---|---|---|---|---|---|---|
| Watra Białka Tatrzańska (player-manager) | 12 January 2018 | 19 June 2018 | 17 | 11 | 4 | 2 | 41 | 19 | +22 | 64.71 |
| Soła Oświęcim | 9 October 2018 | 30 June 2019 | 26 | 11 | 5 | 10 | 33 | 31 | +2 | 42.31 |
| Garbarnia Kraków | 1 July 2019 | 30 June 2021 | 73 | 29 | 18 | 26 | 98 | 95 | +3 | 39.73 |
| Piast Żmigród | 20 December 2021 | 22 March 2022 | 2 | 0 | 1 | 1 | 1 | 2 | −1 | 0.00 |
| Stal Stalowa Wola | 22 March 2022 | 21 March 2023 | 41 | 23 | 6 | 12 | 78 | 39 | +39 | 56.10 |
| Sandecja Nowy Sącz | 15 August 2023 | 5 January 2024 | 15 | 4 | 4 | 7 | 14 | 21 | −7 | 26.67 |
| Pogoń-Sokół Lubaczów | 14 December 2024 | 4 May 2025 | 10 | 3 | 3 | 4 | 14 | 20 | −6 | 30.00 |
| Poland U18 | 23 June 2026 | Present | 4 | 2 | 0 | 2 | 5 | 5 | +0 | 50.00 |
| Total | | | 188 | 83 | 41 | 64 | 284 | 232 | +52 | 44.15 |

== Honours ==
=== Player ===
Legia Warsaw

- Ekstraklasa: 2005–06

=== Manager ===
Soła Oświęcim

- Polish Cup (Wadowice - Oświęcim regionals): 2018–19

Stal Stalowa Wola

- Polish Cup (Subcarpathia regionals): 2021–22
- Polish Cup (Stalowa Wola regionals): 2021–22
