= Wojciech Pawłowski =

Polish footballer

Personal information
- Full name: Wojciech Pawłowski
- Date of birth: 18 January 1993 (age 33)
- Place of birth: Koszalin, Poland
- Height: 1.93 m (6 ft 4 in)
- Position: Goalkeeper

Team information
- Current team: Tytan Mrocza

Youth career
- 2006–2008: Bałtyk Koszalin
- 2008–2010: Lechia Gdańsk

Senior career*
Years	Team	Apps	(Gls)
2010–2011	Lechia Gdańsk II	21	(0)
2010–2012	Lechia Gdańsk	16	(0)
2012–2016	Udinese	0	(0)
2013–2014	→ Latina (loan)	0	(0)
2014–2015	→ Śląsk Wrocław (loan)	3	(0)
2014–2015	→ Śląsk Wrocław II (loan)	12	(0)
2015	→ Bytovia Bytów (loan)	5	(0)
2016	→ Rozwój Katowice (loan)	12	(0)
2016–2019	Górnik Zabrze	2	(0)
2017–2018	Górnik Zabrze II	10	(0)
2019–2021	Widzew Łódź	29	(0)
2022–2023	Unia Janikowo	16	(0)
2023–2025	Elana Toruń	55	(0)
2025	Orlęta Aleksandrów Kujawski	15	(0)
2025–	Tytan Mrocza	0	(0)

International career
2011	Poland U19	1	(0)
2013	Poland U20	1	(0)
- * Club domestic league appearances and goals as of 10:03, 20 June 2025 (UTC)

Wojciech Pawłowski (Polish pronunciation: [ˈvɔjt͡ɕɛx paˈvwɔfskʲi]; born 18 January 1993 in Koszalin) is a Polish professional footballer who plays as a goalkeeper for Klasa B club Tytan Mrocza.

In January 2012, he signed a pre-contract agreement with Udinese Calcio, but Lechia signed an agreement with Granada CF, which has the same owner.

On 4 July 2012, he officially joined Udinese.

On 7 August 2013, Pawłowski was loaned to Italian Serie B side Latina.

== Honours ==
Elana Toruń

- IV liga Kuyavia-Pomerania: 2022–23
- Polish Cup (Kuyavia-Pomerania regionals): 2023–24
