= 2011–12 Śląsk Wrocław season =

Śląsk Wrocław
2011–12 season
- Manager: Orest Lenczyk
- Stadium: Oporowska Stadium (until 22 October 2011); Wrocław Stadium (since 28 October 2011)
- Ekstraklasa: 1st
- Polish Cup: Quarter-finals
- UEFA Europa League: Play-off round
- Biggest win: 4–0 v ŁKS Łódź (Home, 7 August 2011, Ekstraklasa); 4–0 v Polonia Warsaw (Home, 2 October 2011, Ekstraklasa); 5–1 v Zagłębie Lubin (Away, 6 November 2011, Ekstraklasa)
- Biggest defeat: 0–4 v Legia Warsaw (Home, 26 February 2012, Ekstraklasa)
Home colours	Away colours

The 2011–12 season was Śląsk Wrocław's 4th consecutive season in the Ekstraklasa. In addition to the domestic league, the club participated in the Polish Cup and the UEFA Europa League.

Śląsk Wrocław played their final match at the Oporowska Stadium on 22 October 2011, defeating Podbeskidzie Bielsko-Biała 1–0 before relocating to the city's new municipal stadium. The club inaugurated the new Wrocław Stadium on 28 October with a 1–0 victory over Lechia Gdańsk, in the first football match held at the venue.

== Squad ==
Squad at end of season

Note: Flags indicate national team as defined under FIFA eligibility rules; some limited exceptions apply. Players may hold more than one non-FIFA nationality.

No.	Pos.	Nation	Player
3	DF	POL	Piotr Celeban
4	DF	BIH	Amir Spahić
5	MF	POL	Waldemar Sobota
6	MF	SVK	Patrik Mráz
7	MF	POL	Sebastian Dudek
8	MF	POL	Łukasz Madej
10	MF	POL	Mateusz Cetnarski
11	MF	POL	Sebastian Mila
14	DF	POL	Dariusz Pietrasiak
16	MF	SVN	Dalibor Stevanović
17	DF	POL	Mariusz Pawelec
18	FW	NED	Johan Voskamp
19	MF	POL	Dariusz Sztylka

No.	Pos.	Nation	Player
20	FW	POL	Piotr Ćwielong
21	FW	ARG	Cristian Díaz
23	DF	POL	Jarosław Fojut
24	DF	POL	Tadeusz Socha
25	GK	SVK	Marián Kelemen
26	MF	POL	Przemysław Kaźmierczak
27	FW	POL	Łukasz Gikiewicz
28	DF	POL	Marek Wasiluk
29	MF	SVN	Rok Elsner
30	FW	POL	Marcin Staszewski
31	FW	BRA	Alexandre
33	GK	POL	Rafał Gikiewicz

== Competitions ==
=== Overview ===
Competition	First match	Last match	Starting round	Final position	Record							
Competition	First match	Last match	Starting round	Final position	Pld	W	D	L	GF	GA	GD	Win %
Ekstraklasa	31 July 2011	6 May 2012	Matchday 1	Winners	30	17	5	8	47	31	+16	56.67
Polish Cup	27 September 2011	21 March 2012	Second round	Quarter-finals	4	3	0	1	7	4	+3	75.00
UEFA Europa League	14 July 2011	25 August 2011	Second qualifying round	Play-off round	6	1	3	2	5	7	−2	16.67
Total					40	21	8	11	59	42	+17	52.50

Source: Competitions

=== Ekstraklasa ===
==== League table ====
Pos	Team	Pld	W	D	L	GF	GA	GD	Pts	Qualification or relegation
1	Śląsk Wrocław (C)	30	17	5	8	47	31	+16	56	Qualification to Champions League second qualifying round
2	Ruch Chorzów	30	16	7	7	44	28	+16	55	Qualification to Europa League second qualifying round
3	Legia Warsaw	30	15	8	7	42	17	+25	53	Qualification to Europa League second qualifying round (Note: As the winners of the 2011–12 Polish Cup, Legia qualified for the second qualifying round of the 2012–13 UEFA Europa League. Since they finished third in the league, the fourth-placed team of the league also qualified for the Europa League.)
4	Lech Poznań	30	15	7	8	42	22	+20	52	Qualification to Europa League first qualifying round
5	Korona Kielce	30	13	9	8	34	29	+5	48	

Source: 90minut.pl (in Polish)
Rules for classification: 1) points; 2) head-to-head points; 3) head-to-head goal difference; 4) head-to-head goals scored; 5) goal difference; 6) number of goals scored; 7) Fair Play table. Head-to-head record is used only after all the matches between the teams in question have been played
(C) Champions

==== Results summary ====
Overall								Home						Away					
Pld	W	D	L	GF	GA	GD	Pts	W	D	L	GF	GA	GD	W	D	L	GF	GA	GD
30	17	5	8	47	31	+16	56	9	2	4	26	14	+12	8	3	4	21	17	+4

Source: Soccerway

==== Results by round ====
Round	1	2	3	4	5	6	7	8	9	10	11	12	13	14	15	16	17	18	19	20	21	22	23	24	25	26	27	28	29	30
Ground	H	H	A	A	H	A	A	H	H	A	H	H	A	A	H	A	A	H	H	A	H	H	A	A	H	A	A	H	H	A
Result	D	W	W	W	L	L	W	W	W	L	W	W	W	W	L	W	W	D	L	D	L	W	L	L	W	D	D	W	W	W
Position	8	3	3	2	3	5	3	1	1	3	2	2	1	1	1	1	1	1	1	2	2	2	2	3	2	2	3	2	1	1
Points	1	4	7	10	10	10	13	16	19	19	22	25	28	31	31	34	37	38	38	39	39	42	42	42	45	46	47	50	53	56

Source: Worldfootball.net
A = Away; H = Home; W = Win; D = Draw; L = Loss

==== Matches ====
31 July 2011 1	Śląsk Wrocław	1–1	Górnik Zabrze	Wrocław
14:30 CEST (UTC+2)	Díaz 79'	Report	Banaś 33', (yellow card) 69'	Stadium: Oporowska Stadium

7 August 2011 2	Śląsk Wrocław	4–0	ŁKS Łódź	Wrocław
14:30 CEST (UTC+2)	Sztylka 5', 38'; Voskamp 44'; Madej 48'	Report		Stadium: Oporowska Stadium

12 August 2011 3	Ruch Chorzów	0–1	Śląsk Wrocław	Chorzów
18:00 CEST (UTC+2)	Grodzicki (yellow card) 28'; Malinowski (yellow card) 38'; Komac (yellow card) 61'; Szyndrowski (yellow card) 87'	Report	Pietrasiak (yellow card) 80'; Díaz 88'; Madej (yellow card) 90+1'	Stadium: Ruch Chorzów Stadium

21 August 2011 4	Legia Warsaw	1–2	Śląsk Wrocław	Warsaw
17:00 CEST (UTC+2)	Radović (yellow card) 54'; Borysiuk (yellow card) 56'; Ljuboja 77'	Report	Madej 6'; Voskamp 43'; Wasiluk (yellow card) 71'; Kelemen (yellow card) 84'; Elsner (yellow card) 90'	Stadium: Pepsi Arena

28 August 2011 5	Śląsk Wrocław	1–2	Widzew Łódź	Wrocław
14:30 CEST (UTC+2)	Kelemen (yellow card) 48'; Mila 66'; Madej (yellow card) 67'; Socha (yellow card) 90+2'	Report	Dzalamidze 33'; Broź (yellow card) 35'; Bieniuk 38'; Grzelczak (yellow card) 41'; Panka (yellow card) 47'; Mielcarz (yellow card) 85'; Budka (yellow card) 90'	Stadium: Oporowska Stadium

10 September 2011 6	Korona Kielce	2–1	Śląsk Wrocław	Kielce
15:45 CEST (UTC+2)	Kuzera (yellow card) 14' (yellow-red card) 81', (goal) 37'; Malarczyk (yellow card) 22'; Staňo 25'	Report	Voskamp 21'; Elsner (yellow card) 45'; Sobota (yellow card) 61'; Spahić (yellow card) 80'	Stadium: Stadion Miejski

18 September 2011 7	Cracovia	0–1	Śląsk Wrocław	Kraków
14:30 CEST (UTC+2)	Szeliga (yellow card) 38'; Niedzielan (yellow card) 41'; Radomski (yellow card) 82'	Report	Elsner (yellow card) 42'; Sobota 66', (yellow card) 87'; Ćwielong (yellow card) 90'	Stadium: Józef Piłsudski Cracovia Stadium

23 September 2011 8	Śląsk Wrocław	3–1	Lech Poznań	Wrocław
20:30 CEST (UTC+2)	Celeban 11'; Madej 39'; Díaz 72'	Report	Rudņevs 81'	Stadium: Oporowska Stadium

2 October 2011 9	Śląsk Wrocław	4–0	Polonia Warsaw	Wrocław
14:30 CEST (UTC+2)	Celeban 24'; Mila 45'; L. Gikiewicz 77'; Pietrasiak 90'	Report	Kokoszka (yellow card) 39'	Stadium: Oporowska Stadium

15 October 2011 10	GKS Bełchatów	3–0	Śląsk Wrocław	Bełchatów
13:30 CEST (UTC+2)	Buzała 6', 22'; Baran (yellow card) 9'; Tanevski (yellow card) 41'; Božok (yellow card) 51', (goal) 65'; Sapela (yellow card) 56'	Report	Fojut (yellow card) 4'; Pawelec (yellow card) 10'; Socha (yellow card) 41'; Pietrasiak (yellow card) 73'	Stadium: Stadion GKS

22 October 2011 11	Śląsk Wrocław	1–0	Podbeskidzie Bielsko-Biała	Wrocław
15:45 CEST (UTC+2)	Celeban 28'; Elsner (yellow card) 68'	Report	Król (yellow card) 28'; Konieczny (yellow card) 68'	Stadium: Oporowska Stadium

28 October 2011 12	Śląsk Wrocław	1–0	Lechia Gdańsk	Wrocław
20:30 CEST (UTC+2)	Voskamp 51'	Report		Stadium: Wrocław Stadium

6 November 2011 13	Zagłębie Lubin	1–5	Śląsk Wrocław	Lubin
14:30 CET (UTC+1)	Wilczek 77'; Costa (yellow card) 81'	Report	Díaz 2'; Ćwielong 20'; Celeban 64'; Voskamp 84'; Isailović 90' (o.g.)	Stadium: Dialog Arena

18 November 2011 14	Jagiellonia Białystok	0–2	Śląsk Wrocław	Białystok
20:30 CET (UTC+1)	Ćetković (yellow card) 58'; Ptak (yellow card) 67'; Bartczak (yellow card) 75'; Arłukowicz (yellow card) 84'; Pawłowski (yellow card) 90'	Report	Mila (yellow card) 21'; Pawelec (yellow card) 61'; Elsner (yellow card) 65'; Fojut 72'; Cionek 90' (o.g.)	Stadium: Stadion Miejski

25 November 2011 15	Śląsk Wrocław	0–1	Wisła Kraków	Wrocław
20:30 CET (UTC+1)	Mila (yellow card) (not on pitch); Sobota (yellow card) 49'	Report	Wilk (yellow card) 40'; Boguski 50' (pen.); Jirsák (yellow card) 56'; Núñez (yellow card) 75'; Lamey (yellow card) 89'	Stadium: Wrocław Stadium

4 December 2011 16	Górnik Zabrze	0–2	Śląsk Wrocław	Zabrze
14:30 CET (UTC+1)	Marciniak (yellow card) 45'	Report	Sztylka (yellow card) 28'; Celeban 37'; Ćwielong (yellow card) 59'; Sobota 85'	Stadium: Ernest Pohl Stadium

11 December 2011 17	ŁKS Łódź	1–2	Śląsk Wrocław	Łódź
14:30 CET (UTC+1)	Łukasiewicz 10'; Romańczuk (yellow card) 15'; Kašćelan (yellow card) 52'; Szałachowski (yellow card) 66'	Report	Sobota (yellow card) 34'; Pietrasiak (yellow card) 54'; Kaźmierczak 78'; Wasiluk 88'	Stadium: Stadion ŁKS

18 February 2012 18	Śląsk Wrocław	1–1	Ruch Chorzów	Wrocław
18:00 CET (UTC+1)	Fojut (yellow card) 14'; Cetnarski 30'; Kaźmierczak (yellow card) 72'; Celeban (yellow card) 80'	Report	Piech (yellow card) 14', (goal) 77'; Grodzicki (yellow card) 70'; Burliga (yellow card) 86'	Stadium: Wrocław Stadium

26 February 2012 19	Śląsk Wrocław	0–4	Legia Warsaw	Wrocław
14:30 CET (UTC+1)	Pietrasiak (red card) 34'; Elsner (yellow card) 49'; Sobota (yellow card) 55'; Mráz (yellow card) 76'	Report	Gol 1', 13'; Ljuboja 35'; Astiz 68', (yellow card) 80'; Wolski (yellow card) 69'; Żyro (yellow card) 89'	Stadium: Wrocław Stadium

4 March 2012 20	Widzew Łódź	2–2	Śląsk Wrocław	Łódź
14:30 CET (UTC+1)	Okachi 42'; Dudu (yellow card) 51'; Oziębała 90'	Report	Kaźmierczak (yellow card) 6'; Wasiluk 20'; Mila (yellow card) 21'; Madej 78'	Stadium: Widzew Łódź Stadium

11 March 2012 21	Śląsk Wrocław	1–2	Korona Kielce	Wrocław
17:00 CET (UTC+1)	Madej 6'; Pawelec (yellow card) 53'	Report	Kijanskas 20'; Golański (yellow card) 49'; Malarczyk 76'	Stadium: Wrocław Stadium

18 March 2012 22	Śląsk Wrocław	3–0	Cracovia	Wrocław
14:30 CET (UTC+1)	Díaz 4' (pen.); Mila 22', 45'; Pietrasiak (yellow card) 39'; Dudek (yellow card) 73'	Report	Kaczmarek (yellow card) 4'; Nykiel (yellow card) 51'	Stadium: Wrocław Stadium

25 March 2012 23	Lech Poznań	2–0	Śląsk Wrocław	Poznań
14:30 CEST (UTC+2)	Injac (yellow card) 11'; Celeban 49' (o.g.); Rudņevs 90' (pen.)	Report	Madej (yellow card) 25'; Elsner (yellow card) 42'; Socha (yellow card) 79'; Celeban (red card) 90'	Stadium: Poznań Stadium

1 April 2012 24	Polonia Warsaw	3–0	Śląsk Wrocław	Warsaw
17:00 CEST (UTC+2)	Dvalishvili 37'; Čotra (yellow card) 45'; Trałka 55'; Teodorczyk 69'	Report		Stadium: Stadion Polonii Warszawa

7 April 2012 25	Śląsk Wrocław	1–0	GKS Bełchatów	Wrocław
15:45 CEST (UTC+2)	Díaz 84' (pen.), (yellow card) 85'	Report	Kosowski (yellow card) 28'; Popek (yellow card) 83'	Stadium: Wrocław Stadium

14 April 2012 26	Podbeskidzie Bielsko-Biała	1–1	Śląsk Wrocław	Bielsko-Biała
13:30 CEST (UTC+2)	Łatka (yellow card) 45'; Demjan 90'	Report	L. Gikiewicz (yellow card) 56'; Celeban 63'	Stadium: Stadion Miejski

22 April 2012 27	Lechia Gdańsk	1–1	Śląsk Wrocław	Gdańsk
17:00 CEST (UTC+2)	Nowak (yellow card) 36'; Wilk 83'	Report	Socha (red card) 15'; Pawelec (yellow card) 33'; L. Gikiewicz 63'; Díaz (yellow card) 79'	Stadium: PGE Arena Gdańsk

29 April 2012 28	Śląsk Wrocław	2–1	Zagłębie Lubin	Wrocław
14:30 CEST (UTC+2)	Vidanov 4' (o.g.); Mráz (yellow card) 26'; Wołczek (yellow card) 43'; Cetnarski 45'	Report	Woźniak 76'; Banaś (yellow card) 78'	Stadium: Wrocław Stadium

3 May 2012 29	Śląsk Wrocław	3–1	Jagiellonia Białystok	Wrocław
18:00 CEST (UTC+2)	Kaźmierczak 22', 87'; Elsner 39'; Cetnarski (yellow card) 65'	Report	Bandrowski (yellow card) 51'; Kupisz 71' (pen.); Arzumanyan (yellow card) 85'	Stadium: Wrocław Stadium

6 May 2012 30	Wisła Kraków	0–1	Śląsk Wrocław	Kraków
17:00 CEST (UTC+2)	Czekaj (yellow card) 11'; Małecki (yellow card) 62'; Wilk (yellow card) 69'	Report	L. Gikiewicz (yellow card) 20'; Mráz (yellow card) 45+1'; Wołczek (red card) 51'; Elsner 54'	Stadium: Henryk Reyman Municipal Stadium

=== Polish Cup ===
27 September 2011 Second round	Brzesko	1–3	Śląsk Wrocław	Brzesko
15:30 CEST (UTC+2)	Oświęcimka 59'	Report	Mieczkowski 1' (o.g.); Voskamp 13'; Elsner 82'	Stadium: Stadion Okocimskiego KS

18 October 2011 Third round	Podbeskidzie Bielsko-Biała	0–1	Śląsk Wrocław	Bielsko-Biała
18:45 CEST (UTC+2)		Report	Voskamp 52'	Stadium: Stadion Miejski

14 March 2012 Quarter-finals First leg	Arka Gdynia	2–0	Śląsk Wrocław	Gdynia
18:30 CET (UTC+1)	Kuklis 53'; Tomasik 79'	Report	Fojut (red card) 45'	Stadium: Stadion Miejski

21 March 2012 Quarter-finals Second leg	Śląsk Wrocław	3–1 (3–3 (a) agg.)	Arka Gdynia	Wrocław
18:30 CET (UTC+1)	Mila 15', 89'; Díaz 25'	Report	Jarzębowski 13'; Pruchnik (yellow card) (yellow-red card) 86'	Stadium: Wrocław Stadium
Note: 3–3 on aggregate; Arka Gdynia won on away goals.

=== UEFA Europa League ===
==== Qualifying ====
===== Second qualifying round =====
14 July 2011 First leg	Śląsk Wrocław (Poland)	1–0	(Scotland) Dundee United	Wrocław, Poland
16:45 CEST (UTC+2)	Voskamp 75'	Report	Dixon (yellow card) 31'; Flood (yellow card) 83'	Stadium: Oporowska Stadium; Attendance: 8,300; Referee: Tom Harald Hagen (Norway); Assistant referees: Dag-Roger Nebben (Norway), Svein Inge Wiken (Norway); Fourth official: Tommy Skjerven (Norway)

21 July 2011 Second leg	Dundee United (Scotland)	3–2 (3–3 (a) agg.)	(Poland) Śląsk Wrocław	Dundee, Scotland
19:45 BST (UTC+1)	Russell 2', (yellow card) 50'; Goodwillie 5'; Dixon (yellow card) 36'; Daly (yellow card) 44'; Flood (yellow card) 63'	Report	Elsner 15'; Kelemen (yellow card) 43'; Dudek 74'	Stadium: Tannadice Park; Attendance: 11,306; Referee: Antonio Mateu Lahoz (Spain); Assistant referees: Javier Rodriguez (Spain), Pau Cebrián Devís (Spain); Fourth official: Miguel Angel Ayza Gamez (Spain)
Note: 3–3 on aggregate; Śląsk Wrocław won on away goals.

===== Third qualifying round =====
28 July 2011 First leg	Śląsk Wrocław (Poland)	0–0	(Bulgaria) Lokomotiv Sofia	Wrocław, Poland
16:45 CEST (UTC+2)	Spahić (yellow card) 88'	Report	Ivanov (yellow card) 53'; Pisarov (yellow card) 88'	Stadium: Oporowska Stadium; Attendance: 7,000; Referee: Mauro Bergonzi (Italy); Assistant referees: Elenito Di Liberatore (Italy), Massimiliano Rosi (Italy); Fourth official: Sebastiano Peruzzo (Italy)

4 August 2011 Second leg	Lokomotiv Sofia (Bulgaria)	0–0 (a.e.t.) (0–0 agg.) (3–4 p)	(Poland) Śląsk Wrocław	Sofia, Bulgaria (Note: The match was played at the Vasil Levski National Stadium in Sofia, instead of Lokomotiv Sofia regular stadium, the Lokomotiv Stadium, which did not meet UEFA requirements.)
20:30 EEST (UTC+3)	Atanasov (yellow card) 24'; Varbanov (yellow card) 57'; Lahchev (yellow card) 90+6'	Report	Elsner (yellow card) 26'; Mila (yellow card) 100'; Spahić (yellow card) 107'	Stadium: Vasil Levski National Stadium; Attendance: 2,610; Referee: Oliver Drachta (Austria); Assistant referees: Roland Brandner (Austria), Stefan Kuehr (Austria); Fourth official: Thomas Prammer (Austria)
	Penalties
	Goranov (penalty scored); Yordanov (penalty scored); Ivanov (penalty missed); Dobrev (penalty scored); Dafchev (penalty missed)		(penalty scored) Sztylka; (penalty scored) Mila; (penalty scored) Madej; (penalty scored) Pietrasiak
Note: 0–0 on aggregate; Śląsk Wrocław won 4–3 on penalties.

==== Play-off round ====
18 August 2011 First leg	Śląsk Wrocław (Poland)	1–3	(Romania) Rapid București	Wrocław, Poland
20:00 CEST (UTC+2)	Mila 16', (yellow card) 76'; Wasiluk (yellow card) 29'; Díaz (yellow card) 41'; Socha (yellow card) 62'	Report	Grigore 24'; Roman 34'; Marcos António (yellow card) 34'; Apostol 79'; Duarte (yellow card) 82'; Herea (yellow card) 89'	Stadium: Oporowska Stadium; Attendance: 7,200; Referee: Michael Weiner (Germany); Assistant referees: Holger Henschel (Germany), Thorsten Schiffner (Germany); Fourth official: Peter Gagelmann (Germany)

25 August 2011 Second leg	Rapid București (Romania)	1–1 (4–2 agg.)	(Poland) Śląsk Wrocław	Timișoara, Romania (Note: The match was played at the Dan Păltinișanu Stadium in Timișoara, as Rapid București had left their own Stadionul Giulești-Valentin Stănescu prior to the season.)
21:00 EEST (UTC+3)	Pancu 12'; Alexa (yellow card) 22'; Marcos António (yellow card) 84'	Report	Sobota (yellow card) 46', (goal) 90+2'; Socha (yellow card) 48'; Díaz (yellow card) 72'; Madej (yellow card) 81'	Stadium: Dan Păltinișanu Stadium; Attendance: 3,383; Referee: Martin Hansson (Sweden); Assistant referees: Joakim Flink (Sweden), Peter Vesterholm (Sweden); Fourth official: Johan Hamlin (Sweden)
Note: Rapid București won 4–2 on aggregate.
