= 2012 Polish Super Cup =

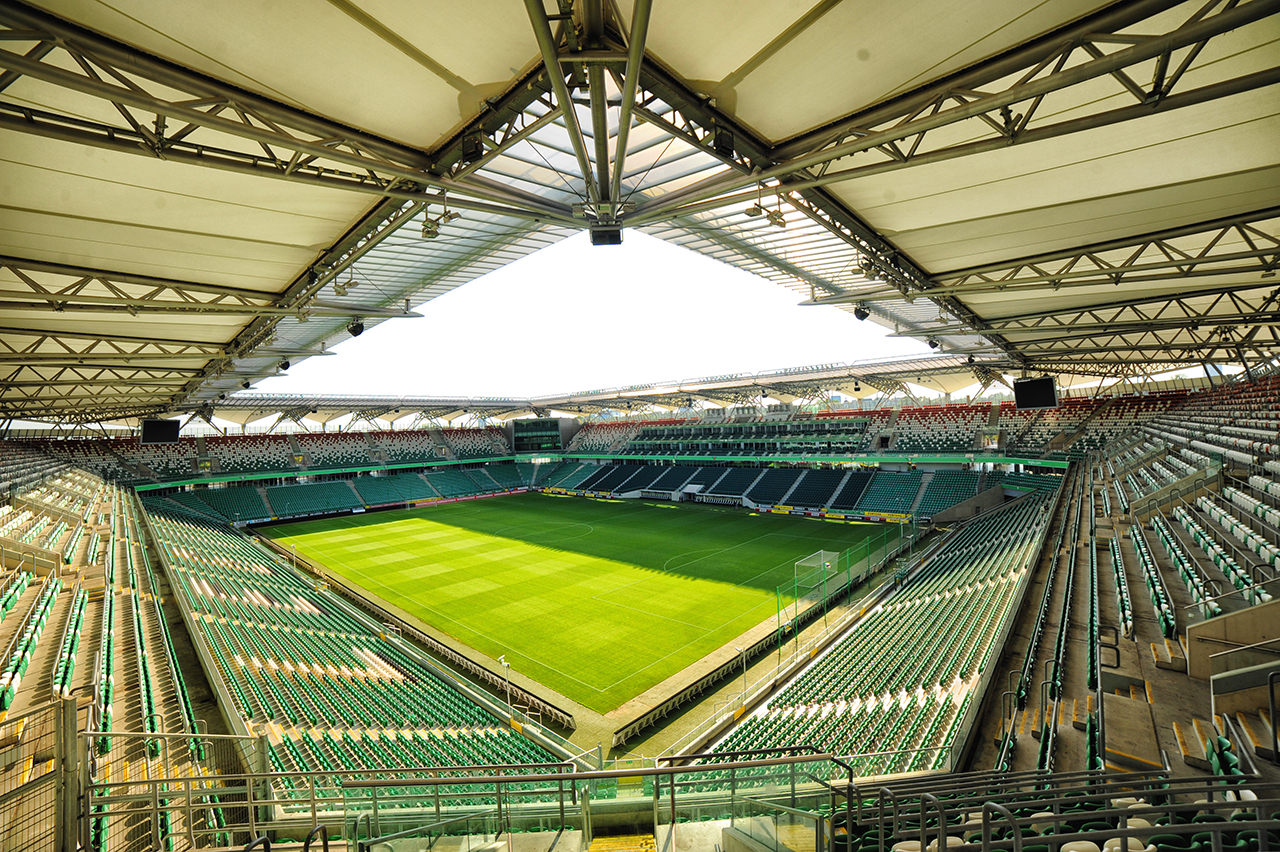
- The Polish Army Stadium in Warsaw hosted the final.
Śląsk Wrocław	Legia Warsaw
1	1
- Śląsk Wrocław won 4–2 on penalties
- Date: 12 August 2012
- Venue: Polish Army Stadium, Warsaw
- Referee: Daniel Stefański (Bydgoszcz)
- Attendance: 5,000

The 2012 Polish Super Cup was held on 12 August 2012 between the 2011–12 Ekstraklasa winners Śląsk Wrocław and the 2011–12 Polish Cup winners Legia Warsaw. Śląsk Wrocław won the match on penalties after the match finished 1–1, winning the trophy for the second time in their history.

== Match details ==
12 August 2012
15:30 CEST (UTC+02:00)

Śląsk Wrocław	1–1	Legia Warsaw
Elsner 40'	90minut Soccerway	Ljuboja 60'
Penalties
Mila (penalty scored); Sobota (penalty scored); Kowalczyk (penalty scored); Jodłowiec (penalty missed); Cetnarski (penalty scored)	4–2	(penalty scored) Rzeźniczak; (penalty missed) Saganowski; (penalty missed) Radović; (penalty scored) Ljuboja

Polish Army Stadium, Warsaw
Attendance: 5,000
Referee: Daniel Stefański (Bydgoszcz)

Śląsk Wrocław:
GK	33	(Poland) Rafał Gikiewicz
DF	17	(Poland) Mariusz Pawelec
DF	14	(Poland) Marcin Kowalczyk
DF	24	(Poland) Tadeusz Socha	Yellow card
MF	11	(Poland) Sebastian Mila
MF	16	(Slovenia) Dalibor Stevanović	Yellow card	(substituted off) 77'
MF	3	(Poland) Tomasz Jodłowiec	Yellow card
MF	29	(Slovenia) Rok Elsner		(substituted off) 77'
MF	5	(Poland) Waldemar Sobota
MF	9	(Poland) Sylwester Patejuk		(substituted off) 88'
FW	21	(Argentina) Cristian Omar Díaz		(substituted off) 46'
Substitutes:
GK	25	(Slovakia) Marián Kelemen
DF	15	(Poland) Rafał Grodzicki
DF	28	(Poland) Marek Wasiluk
MF	10	(Poland) Mateusz Cetnarski		(substituted on) 77'
MF	26	(Poland) Przemysław Kaźmierczak		(substituted on) 77'
FW	18	(Netherlands) Johan Voskamp		(substituted on) 46'
FW	27	(Poland) Łukasz Gikiewicz		(substituted on) 88'
Manager:
(Poland) Orest Lenczyk

Legia Warsaw:
GK	12	(Slovakia) Dušan Kuciak
DF	25	(Poland) Jakub Rzeźniczak
DF	2	(Poland) Artur Jędrzejczyk	Yellow card
DF	14	(Poland) Jakub Wawrzyniak		(substituted off) 70'
DF	15	(Spain) Iñaki Astiz
MF	21	(Croatia) Ivica Vrdoljak
MF	5	(Poland) Janusz Gol		(substituted off) 46'
MF	33	(Poland) Michał Żyro		(substituted off) 46'
MF	18	(Poland) Michał Kucharczyk		(substituted off) 46'
MF	37	(Poland) Dominik Furman		(substituted off) 70'
FW	9	(Poland) Marek Saganowski
Substitutes:
GK	84	(Poland) Wojciech Skaba
DF	8	(Slovenia) Marko Šuler		(substituted on) 70'
DF	11	(Poland) Tomasz Kiełbowicz
MF	32	(Serbia) Miroslav Radović		(substituted on) 46'
MF	35	(Poland) Daniel Łukasik		(substituted on) 70'
FW	20	(Poland) Jakub Kosecki	Yellow card	(substituted on) 46'
FW	28	(Serbia) Danijel Ljuboja		(substituted on) 46'
Manager:
(Poland) Jan Urban

== See also ==
- 2012–13 Ekstraklasa
- 2012–13 Polish Cup
