= 2003 Wrocław football riot =

2003 riot in Wrocław, Poland

The Wrocław football riot 2003 was an organised fight between Polish football hooligans in Wrocław, Lower Silesia Poland on 30 March 2003. As a result of the incident, one person died, 229 hooligans were arrested and more than twelve were taken to the hospital.

== Background ==
Arranged football hooligan fights in Poland are known as ustawka. They became common in Poland in the late 1990s.

Each club has a hooligan firm and from these, different firms form alliances, supporting each other in their fights with other firms.

== The fight ==
On 30 March 2003 a Polish Second Division game between Śląsk Wrocław and Arka Gdynia took place in Wrocław (Stadion Oporowska). Hooligans from Wrocław, Poznań, Kraków, Gdynia and Lubin all took part in the huge fight which was centred on Grabiszynska Street, 500 m from the stadium, using knives, cleavers, wooden clubs and stones. Triad was defeated and fled from the place of combat.

Wrocław police later stated that the fight had been pre-arranged, adding that "They did not come to watch the game; they had made an appointment on their mobile phones to fight". Local residents had to hide in houses, shops and buses as the fight, which lasted some hours spread through the city. When the police arrived some of the hooligans attacked them with stones, before the police restored order, using water cannons on the rioters. After the arrival of a special police squad, the police finally surrounded most of the hooligans, ordering them to lie down, and 120 people were arrested.

Ambulances took the injured to hospitals in Wrocław. A 24-year-old Arka Gdynia fan, named only as Mariusz B, who had been stabbed in the back, died in the hospital. Some witnesses claimed that he had fallen onto a street lamp, collapsed and was then beaten up. Of those taken to the hospital most had stab wounds, as well as fractures and contusions. However, most refused hospital treatment as they believed they would be arrested by the police. Rydygier hospital confirmed that some had fled the hospital and that one had a broken leg, another's shoulder was dislocated. Still another had stab wounds in his thigh, but all three refused to be hospitalized and left. Others were seen at Babiński hospital with most of them also refusing treatment.

In a statement to the Polish State News agency, PAP, The head of the Polish Football Association, Michal Listkiewicz, blamed the violence on what he called "bandits posing as fans", adding that, "They are murdering Polish soccer and all of our sport."

== Aftermath ==
Wrocław Police Department announced that 229 hooligans were arrested. 100 were subsequently banned from football matches in Poland for three years. 120 were indicted on charges of assault with a dangerous weapon by the district prosecutor and 100 were found guilty.

The police had videotape evidence from the fight, which has been handed to them by a local man. And so they knew the circumstances of the killing of the Arka Gdynia fan who had died of knife wounds, which had been inflicted by a man, named only as Tomasz P, a Wisła Kraków fan, who a few months later was caught hiding under a false name in Rzeszów in southeastern Poland. In October 2005 he was sentenced to ten years imprisonment.

== See also ==
- List of hooligan firms
- Słupsk street riots 1998
- 2015 Knurów riots
- Football hooliganism in Poland
