= Football hooliganism in Poland =

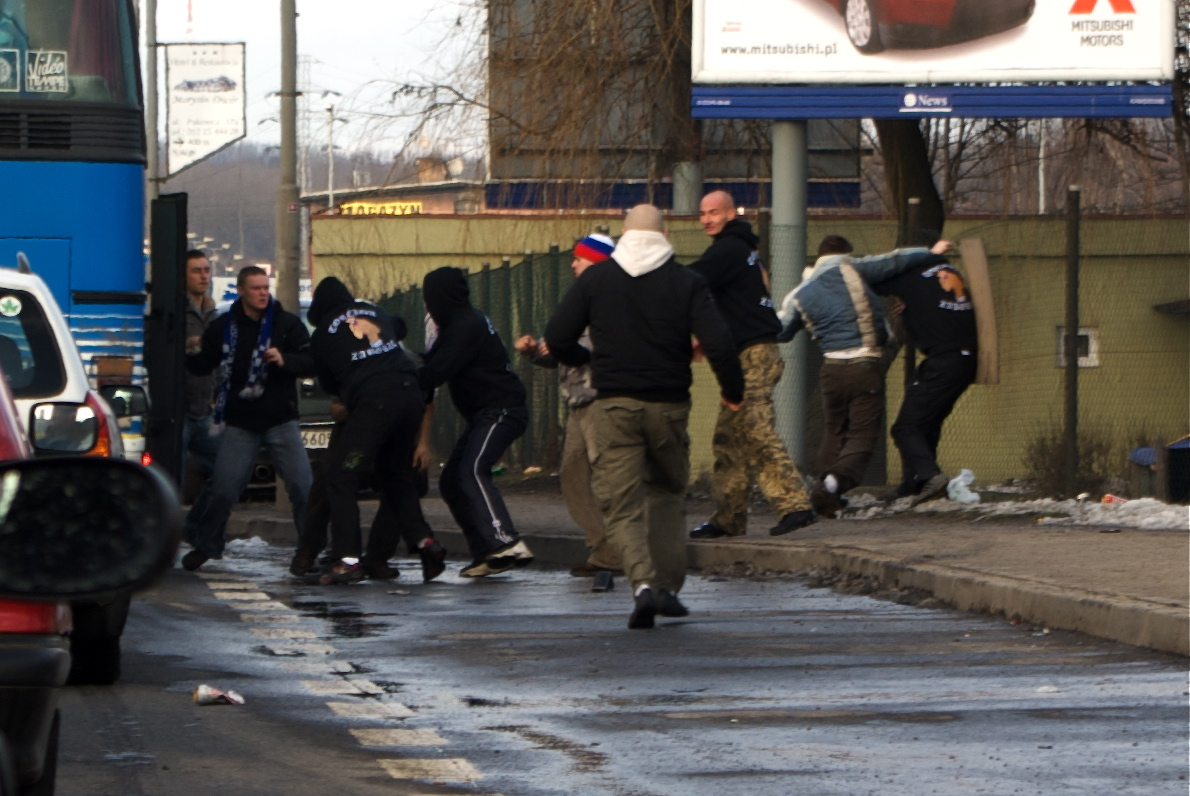
Polish football hooligans from Ruch Chorzów and Górnik Zabrze in violent clash

Football hooliganism in Poland first developed as a recognised phenomenon in the 1970s, and has continued since then with numerous recognised hooligan firms and large-scale fights. Until 1997, the number of related incidents rose, according to Przemysław Piotrowski of Jagiellonian University. The problem of hooliganism related to football has been compared to what he described as the dark days of football hooliganism in Eastern Europe in the 1980s. Hooliganism in Poland is considered to be on a larger scale than hooliganism in Britain. Many Polish football clubs have hooligan firms associated with them.

== History ==
=== Early years ===
The first reports of clashes between fans during football games date back as far as the 1930s. On 2 June 1935 after a game between Cracovia and Ruch Chorzów, the police had to "intervene and surround the field". On 15 June 1936, the Przegląd Sportowy daily sports newspaper published an appeal by the management of Śląsk Świętochłowice, asking their fans to "control their behaviour and maintain order". During the occupation of Poland in World War II, the German occupiers banned all sports. However, "illegal" games were played on a regular basis. During one of these matches in Kraków on 17 October 1943, fans of Cracovia and Wisła Kraków interrupted the game and started fighting which spread onto the streets of the Ludwinow district in Kraków. The fighting lasted for several hours.

After a match on 29 September 1947 in Sosnowiec, between RKU Sosnowiec and AKS Chorzów (ethnic rivalry, derby) fighting broke out resulting in the death of one fan and scores of others injured. Sosnowiec won the match 3–2, however in the first leg AKS Chorzów had won 3–0, meaning they were promoted to the First Division. After the match, 20,000 home fans were slowly moving out of the stadium, pushed by firemen and Milicja Obywatelska. Skirmishes broke out, and the Milicja Obywatelska functionaries, with guns, lined up on the pitch and attacked the fans with bayonets and the fighting lasted for two hours. Sosnowiec fans tried to attack AKS's players, the referees and the militiamen. Although incidents from the 1920s to the 1960s were numerous, there was no organized hooliganism in Poland.

=== 1970s ===
There is no official information about football related violence in the 1970s as any incidents that happened were not reported by the Polish media which was compliant with the policies of the Communist authorities in the People's Republic of Poland. Sporadic incidents took place, usually in the streets near to stadiums, near railway stations. By the late 1970s there were about ten hooligan firms, mostly connected to Polish First Division clubs. Few Polish football fans travelled to away matches.

The common name for Polish football fans is scarfers (Polish: szalikowcy). It is unclear when the first scarfers appeared. As the number of scarfers grew, the Polish Football Association tried to curb these groups. The renowned referee and journalist Grzegorz Aleksandrowicz initiated the so-called "Fan Clubs", but this idea disappeared at the beginning of the 1980s, due to martial law in Poland and Aleksandrowicz's death.

In the mid-1970s, friendships between some groups began. Probably the oldest still active alliance is the one between fans of Polonia Bytom and Arka Gdynia, which dates back to 1974. Other alliances, such as that between Legia Warsaw and Zagłębie Sosnowiec and that between Polonia Warsaw and Cracovia date back to the late 1970s. Usually, alliances were (and still are) created by firms of clubs that are located a considerable distance from each other. Firms of neighbouring clubs, especially in the same city, are in most cases enemies.

=== 1980s ===
The early 1980s saw a rise in the number of hooligan firms and in the number of hooligans. On 9 May 1980 Legia Warsaw faced Lech Poznań in Częstochowa in the final of the Polish Cup. The match was won by Legia. However, it is remembered by many as one of the biggest clashes between fans. Fighting, which involved hundreds of fans, started in the streets of the city before the game. A number of people were seriously injured. The Communist government of Poland concealed all the facts about the incident. Since that game, fans of both sides have regarded each other as enemies.

The first reported incident of football hooliganism by the media happened in 1981 during a match between Widzew Łódź and Legia Warszawa which was shown live on Polish television, when Legia fans invaded the pitch. As it was transmitted live on television, the government was unable to cover up the incident. The number of incidents during games grew in the 1980s. Although the statistics in this period are incomplete, between 1984 and 1988, 99 cases of disorder were reported, most of them in big cities. Two football fans were officially reported to have been killed in the 1980s due to football hooliganism.

=== 1990s ===
Until the late 1980s the football clubs required state sponsorship to exist. The revenues from ticket sales and merchandising were irrelevant at that time. Before entering a free-market economy, the bargaining power of supporters thus played a relatively marginal role in the Polish football scene.

Since then, hooligan firms in Poland have organised themselves and are often influenced by the skinhead subculture. Some skinhead members of firms are described as "official hooligans", and their role is to take part in disturbances at the stadiums. They often use weapons, such as wooden sticks, bats, baseball bats and knives.

In Poland, the 1990s saw a gradual increase in football-related violence and development of the football hooligan subculture. One of the most infulental groups during that time was Hooligans from Arka (HFA) Arka Gdynia supporters. Zbyszek Rybak introduced martial arts enthusiasts to hooligan underworld in Poland. Hooligan incidents in Poland gained more media attention in the 1990s, at a time when fanzines started to be published, which included details of incidents and what was described as the "Polish hooligan league". From the early 1990s, Polish hooligans were heavily influenced by the skinhead, UK and western hooligans culture. Data from the National Police Headquarters showed a steady increase from 1991 to 1997, although there was then a decrease in the subsequent years. Fights became more organized, and started moving away from the stadiums - Ustawka fight. As the decade progressed, fights would be organised by mobile phone and over the Internet. The 1990s saw a rise in the number of hooligan firms up to about 70 or 80.

Often hooligans would join forces to attack the police, as happened during a World Cup qualifying match between Poland and England on 29 May 1993 in Chorzów. Feuding between Polish hooligans escalated when, before the match, hools from Cracovia stabbed a Pogoń Szczecin fan to death. Polish hooligans from Lechia Gdańsk, Katowice and Legia Warszawa fought each other before, during and after the match. Other hooligan disturbances followed the Polish national team, with incidents in Zabrze in 1994, and abroad in Rotterdam in 1992 and Bratislava in 1995.

Also in the 1990s, Polish hooligan violence spread through the lower leagues and into more urban areas of the country. In May 1997, fans of Fourth Division club, Sandecja Nowy Sącz clashed with the police, and 54 fans were detained.

=== 2000s ===
Even though the Polish government tried to erase hooliganism, incidents were still common in Polish stadiums. However, like hooligans in Western Europe, Polish firms now pre-arrange their fights, which in Poland are known as ustawka, and are mainly fought in meadows, rural terrains, far from city centers and cops. In December 2005 a huge organised fight took place in a forest outside Frankfurt between Polish and German hooligans. The Poles won the battle, after which they were arrested by German police. It was feared that the fight was a warm up for more fights during the World Cup which was to be held in Germany the next year.

On 3 May 2004 Ruch Chorzów was playing a match with ŁKS, arch-rival of Widzew which hool's have friendship with Ruch firm Psycho Fans. Planned riots erupted in halftime. A lot of fans of three clubs were injured also policemen (55 hospitalized), 12 police cars were devastated. Despite the capture of many hool's (over 100) Policja are still looking for participants in brawl.

In March 2006 a Wisła Kraków fan was dragged from a car and stabbed to death, the eighth stabbing murder in twelve months of football hooligans in Poland.

Football violence is still present even in city centres. In May 2006 over 50 police functionaries were injured, with over 30 hospitalised and 230 hooligans detained after disturbances in Warsaw following a match between Legia Warsaw and Wisła Kraków. Thousands of Legia fans had converged in the city centre celebrating the club winning the Polish League title, where they broke into shops, damaged cafes and restaurants and attacked the police with stones. The police had to use water cannons to contain the hooligans.

Before the 2006 World Cup in Germany, German authorities and some of the European media were concerned that Polish hooligans would try to disrupt the tournament. Reports stated that Polish hooligans were ready to do battle with fans from England and other countries in Germany. However, no major incidents were reported, with isolated clashes taking place such as drunken German and Polish fans clashing in Dortmund resulting in 300 arrests, half of whom were Polish.

It was stated in 2006 that the current football hooliganism in Poland is far worse than the dark days of English football hooliganism in the 1980s, with nearly every Polish professional football club having a fan base rooted in hooliganism. This is especially true now as English football hooliganism has become a rare and harshly punished occurrence, with few firms still running, the most prevalent being "The Soul Crew", the firm of Welsh football club Cardiff City F.C., who have more fan bans than any other team in the English leagues. A match between local Warsaw rivals, Polonia Warszawa and Legia in April 2006 saw over 1,300 riot police, armed with CS gas and rifles with rubber bullets fail to control 3,000 fans. Instead of keeping the two sets of fans apart, the police shepherded them all into the city centre where running battles ensued. A common feature of Polish hooligans is also ambushing rival fans then stealing their scarves and flags, before tying them to railings in the stadium and setting them on fire.

In July 2007, UEFA banned Legia Warsaw from European competition for one season and also for one more season should they qualify for any European competition in the following five years, following riots during an Intertoto Cup match in Lithuania against Vetra Vilnius forced the game to be abandoned. With Vetra Vilnius winning 2–0 at half time, several hundred Legia fans, out of the 2,500 Polish fans present, wrecked the stand they were in and invaded the pitch, where they attacked 200 police officers, throwing concrete, bottles and flares at them. They then ripped up advertising boards in an attempt to prevent the mounted police, tear gas and baton charges by the police. A total of 26 Legia fans were arrested, with ten later released. Seven fans were later jailed for between five and fifteen days and fined.

In September 2007, Wisła Kraków hooligans killed a Korona Kielce fan in Kielce. The Korona Kielce firm had been allied with Cracovia at the time.

=== 2010s ===
As the modernisation of stadiums and further repression of fans increases, incidents in the public eye remained sporadic, with now majority of incidents involving police. Hooliganism remains popular, but has been pushed further underground.

In April 2012, Polonia Warsaw fans were attacked by security guards with tear gas after they refused to remove the flag "Down with Communism".

At the Euro 2012, despite a generally peaceful tournament, a fight broke after Russian fans marched through the capital Warsaw for their match against Poland and were attacked by Polish hooligans. The only other incident at the tournament held in Poland (and Ukraine) was the fight between Croatian fans, and the arrest of several Irish fans, however no Poles were involved.

In home derby match against Legia's reserves, a fight broke out between two sets of Polonia Warsaw fans in April 2013. The fight broke out due ideological differences and arguments over apoliticism in the stand among fans.

When Lech Poznań played Wisła Kraków in May 2013, the Lech fans successfully stole a Wisła flag from the away stand, causing unrest among Wisła fans. Despite this, no actual fights broke out, however the away stand was demolished.

In August 2013, in match lower league match KS Łomianki versus Polonia Warsaw, hundreds of Legia fans turned up and tried to attack the visiting fans, although they only clashed with police. KS Łomianki was later fined for failing to adequately secure the venue and poor organisation was cited.

In March 2014, in the first incident inside a top-level stadium in years occurred when Legia Warsaw fans attacked the visiting Jagiellonia Białystok fans after Legia fans displayed several previously stolen Jagiellonia flags. The match was abandoned. There were several arrests.

A short time later that same year, Zawisza Bydgoszcz fans began to boycott matches after a match against Widzew Łódź. The fans claim that the police brutally assaulted fans, when preventing Zawisza and ŁKS Łódź fans from entering the stadium, including women, the elderly and children, causing one fan to lose their eye. Following the incident, the fans asked to see the security footage, however, the footage was claimed to be lost due to an alleged "technical fault". The club chairman, Radosław Osuch, and a large portion of the media and public opinion, attributed the incident to football hooliganism.

On 2 May 2015, at a Concordia Knurów versus Ruch Radzionków fifth division match in Knurów, Upper Silesia, police started firing rubber bullets at fans from a close distance after several home fans jumped onto the pitch and ran towards the visiting fans. A 27-year-old fan of Concordia, Dawid Dziedzic, was shot, and despite attempts to resuscitate him he died shortly in hospital hours later. He was a single father, described as a caring parent from a modest background. In the aftermath, rioting ensued for several days. 46 people were arrested, many injured fans as well as policemen. Thousands of people attended Dziedzic's funeral on 7 May 2015.

== Politics ==
Due to long communist rule in country and overall Polish society's social conservatism, Polish football supporters are on the right-wing political spectrum. In the PRL era, football grounds and the supporters were one of the main opposition voices. Some fans are also alt-right and/or ultra-nationalist activists. Usual displays and chants centre around nationalist themes, and stadiums can also serve as a recruiting grounds for the nationalist organizations.

== Relationships ==
Most sports teams in Poland have organised supporter groups who are actively in involved in either the ultras scene or the hooligan scene. All these groups in Poland have 4 types of relationships between each other which are subject to change over time. They extend to normal fans as well.

- friendships (zgody) – an alliance between two sets of supporters, whereby fans visit each other's matches frequently and on matches between two such sides very often there are no divisions between away and home fans but both sets of fans are in the same stand.
- agreements (układy) – a provisional agreement of co-operation between two sets of fans. Usually if they last they become friendships later on.
- enemies (kosy) – a rival team. Usually a rival of a friend is also their rival.
- hatred (kosa) – a hatred between two rival teams. Often the hatred is so intense, it results in violence.
- neutral – there is no specific antipathy or sympathy towards each other.

These relationships can be complicated and change over time. Although hooligans of two neutral teams may sometime fight each other, they would usually focus on fighting with their "enemy" clubs and supporting their "allies" in fighting their "friends" "enemies".

== See also ==
- List of hooligan firms
- Wrocław football riot 2003
- Słupsk street riots 1998
- Knurów riots 2015
- Ultras
