= Mielcarz =

Mielcarz is a Polish surname. Notable people with the surname include:

- Maciej Mielcarz (born 1980), Polish footballer
- Magdalena Mielcarz (born 1978), Polish actress
