= Arłukowicz =

Arłukowicz is a Polish surname. Notable people with the surname include:

- Bartosz Arłukowicz (born 1971), Polish politician
- Grzegorz Arłukowicz (born 1992), Polish footballer
