= Mariusz Pawelec =

Polish footballer

Personal information
- Full name: Mariusz Pawelec
- Date of birth: 14 April 1986 (age 40)
- Place of birth: Lublin, Poland
- Height: 1.80 m (5 ft 11 in)
- Positions: Left-back; centre-back

Team information
- Current team: Śląsk Wrocław II (assistant)

Senior career*
Years	Team	Apps	(Gls)
2003–2007	Górnik Łęczna	57	(0)
2007–2008	→ Górnik Zabrze (loan)	15	(0)
2008–2023	Śląsk Wrocław	248	(2)
2014–2025	Śląsk Wrocław II	56	(2)
Total		376	(4)

International career
2005–2008	Poland U21	11	(1)
2007–2008	Poland	2	(0)
- * Club domestic league appearances and goals

Mariusz Pawelec (born 14 April 1986) is a Polish former professional footballer who played as a defender. He currently serves as an assistant coach of Śląsk Wrocław II.

== Honours ==
Śląsk Wrocław

- Ekstraklasa: 2011–12
- Polish Super Cup: 2012
- Ekstraklasa Cup: 2008–09

Śląsk Wrocław II

- III liga, group III: 2019–20
- IV liga Lower Silesia East: 2018–19
