= Sylwester Patejuk =

Polish footballer

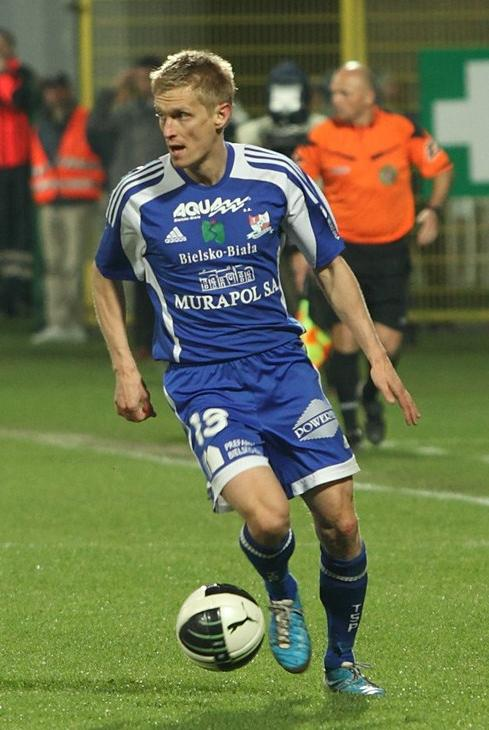

Personal information
- Full name: Sylwester Patejuk
- Date of birth: 30 November 1982 (age 43)
- Place of birth: Warsaw, Poland
- Height: 1.88 m (6 ft 2 in)
- Position: Winger

Youth career
- Hutnik Warsaw

Senior career*
Years	Team	Apps	(Gls)
2002–2003	Hutnik Warsaw		
2003–2004	Hutnik Warsaw II		
2004–2006	Perła Złotokłos		
2007–2008	Korona Góra Kalwaria		
2009	Nida Pińczów	15	(6)
2009–2012	Podbeskidzie Bielsko-Biała	49	(13)
2012–2014	Śląsk Wrocław	50	(5)
2013	Śląsk Wrocław II	1	(0)
2014–2015	Podbeskidzie Bielsko-Biała	18	(1)
2014	Podbeskidzie II	3	(0)
2015–2016	Zawisza Bydgoszcz	19	(4)
2016–2018	Wisła Puławy	49	(11)
2018–2022	KS Raszyn	87	(33)
- * Club domestic league appearances and goals

Sylwester Patejuk (born 30 November 1982) is a Polish former professional footballer who played as a winger.

== Career ==
=== Club ===
He joined Podbeskidzie Bielsko-Biała in July 2009.

In June 2012, he joined Śląsk Wrocław.

In 2016, Patejuk signed for Wisła Puławy.

== Honours ==
Śląsk Wrocław

- Polish Super Cup: 2012

Individual

- I liga Left Midfielder of the Season: 2016–17
- I liga Team of the Season: 2016–17
