= Mindaugas Panka =

Lithuanian footballer

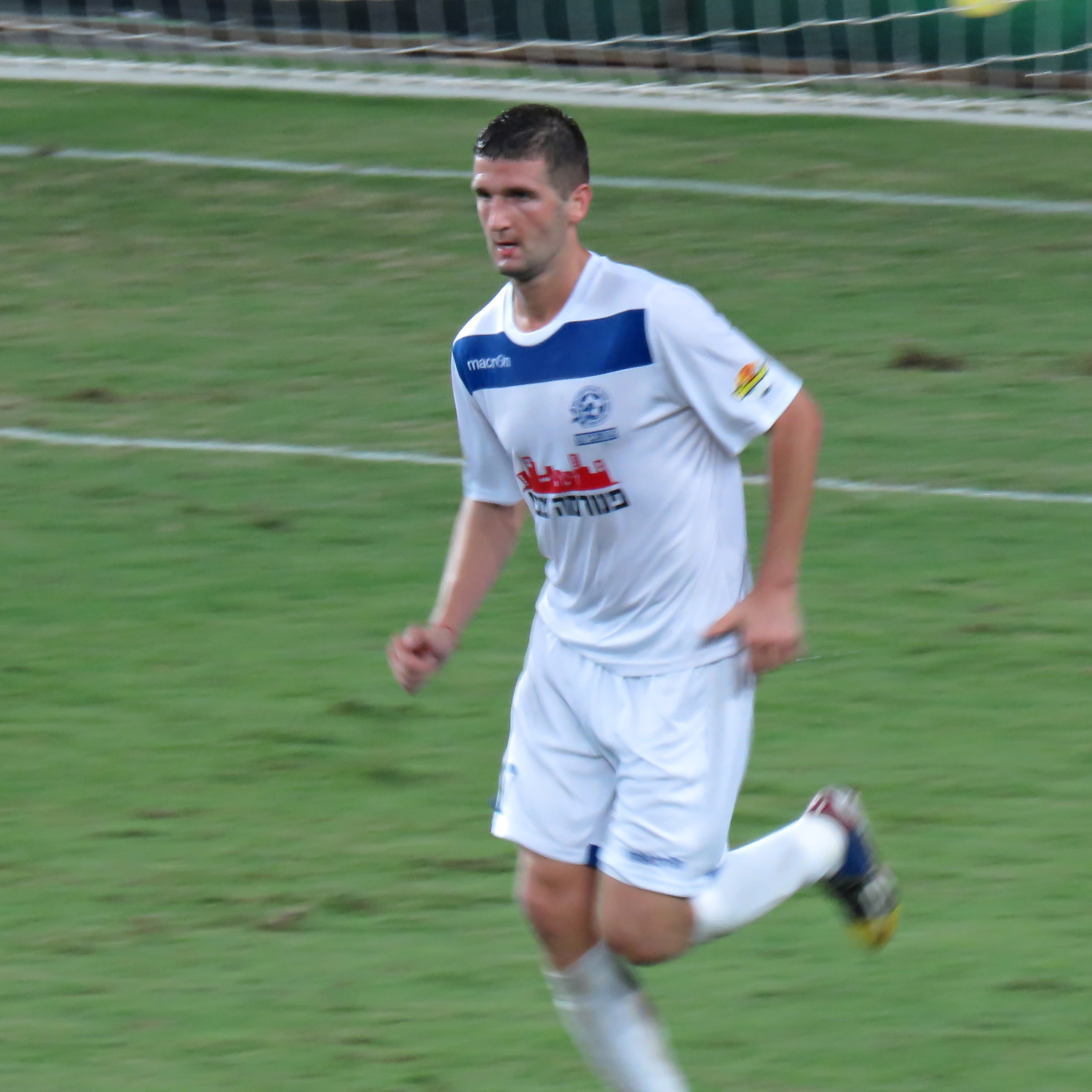

Personal information
- Full name: Mindaugas Panka
- Date of birth: 1 May 1984 (age 42)
- Place of birth: Alytus, Lithuanian SSR, Soviet Union
- Height: 1.84 m (6 ft 0 in)
- Position: Midfielder

Senior career*
| Years | Team | Apps | (Gls) |
| 2000–2002 | Dainava Alytus | | |
| 2002–2006 | Vilnius | 99 | (20) |
| 2004 | → Lokomotiv Moscow | 0 | (0) |
| 2007 | Vėtra | 19 | (1) |
| 2007–2012 | Widzew Łódź | 122 | (12) |
| 2012–2013 | Ruch Chorzów | 19 | (2) |
| 2013–2015 | Ironi Kiryat Shmona | 57 | (9) |
| 2015–2016 | Maccabi Petah Tikva | 8 | (1) |
| 2016 | Hapoel Petah Tikva | 15 | (1) |
| 2016–2017 | Hapoel Acre | 6 | (0) |
| 2018 | FK Atlantas | 9 | (1) |

International career
| 2008–2016 | Lithuania | 40 | (0) |
- * Club domestic league appearances and goals

Mindaugas Panka (born 1 May 1984) is a Lithuanian former professional footballer who played as a midfielder. He made his name in Widzew Łódź where he made over 120 league appearances and scored 12 goals.

== Honours ==
Widzew Łódź

- I liga: 2008–09, 2009–10

Ironi Kiryat Shmona

- Israel State Cup: 2013–14
