= Piotr Celeban =

Polish footballer (born 1985)

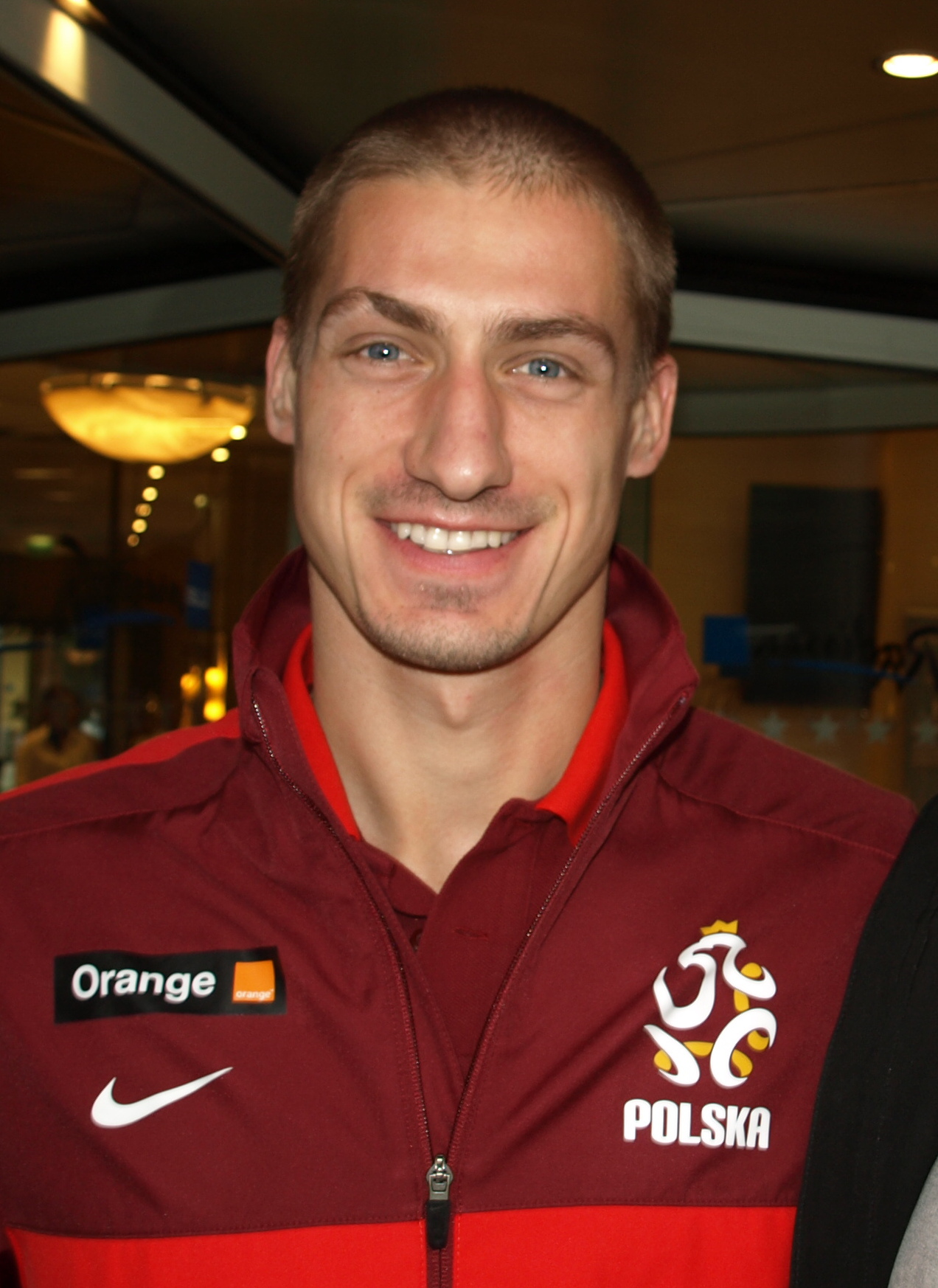
- Celeban in 2013 with the Poland national team

Personal information
- Full name: Piotr Celeban
- Date of birth: June 25, 1985 (age 41)
- Place of birth: Szczecin, Poland
- Height: 1.81 m (5 ft 11 1/2 in)
- Position: Defender

Team information
- Current team: Śląsk Wrocław II & Poland U15 (fitness coach)

Youth career
- –2004: Pogoń Szczecin

Senior career*
Years	Team	Apps	(Gls)
2004–2007	Pogoń Szczecin	33	(4)
2006	→ Śląsk Wrocław (loan)	16	(2)
2007–2008	Korona Kielce	13	(0)
2008–2012	Śląsk Wrocław	114	(14)
2012–2014	Vaslui	55	(11)
2014–2021	Śląsk Wrocław	198	(17)
2019–2022	Śląsk Wrocław II	30	(1)
Total		469	(49)

International career
2003–2004	Poland U19	7	(0)
2005–2006	Poland U21	5	(0)
2008–2013	Poland	10	(0)
- * Club domestic league appearances and goals

Piotr Oliver Celeban (born 25 June 1985) is a Polish former professional footballer who currently serves as a fitness coach of Śląsk Wrocław II and the Poland national under-15 team. Although primarily a central defender, when needed he operated as a right-back. He is known for his powerful heading and goal scoring ability. Besides Poland, he has played in Romania.

== Club career ==
Celeban made his first appearance in Ekstraklasa in May 2005 against Górnik Łęczna.

=== Vaslui ===
==== 2012–13 season ====
On 20 June 2012, Vaslui announced that they had reached an agreement to sign Celeban on a free transfer from Śląsk Wrocław. He signed a four-year contract and was handed the number 5 shirt. On 4 July, he made his debut for Vaslui in a 9–1 win in a preseason friendly over Bischoffen. He made his Liga I debut for Vaslui on 22 July in a 2–2 draw with Rapid București. Despite playing as a right back in Vaslui's opening against Rapid, Celeban established himself in the central defence alongside Cape Verde international Fernando Varela. Celeban scored his first goal for Vaslui on 27 August in a 3–1 win against Steaua București. On 1 September, Celeban scored a late header against Viitorul Constanța, assisted by a cross from Dacian Varga. Celeban made it 2–2 which also was the final score. On 3 November, he scored a brace, bringing his tally to 4 goals in 10 league games, as Vaslui defeated Ceahlăul Piatra Neamț 4–3. On 1 April 2013, he scored another brace in a 3–2 win against Viitorul Constanța, which ended Vaslui's run of five games without a win. Celeban continued to impress and scored with a header his seventh league goal of the season against Dinamo București. He managed to finish as Vaslui's top goalscorer with 7 goals, alongside team captain Lucian Sânmărtean. He was also Liga I's top scorer defender and Liga I's top header scorer with 5 goals, alongside Takayuki Seto and Bojan Golubović. Celeban was selected for the ProSport Team of the Year alongside teammate Zhivko Milanov.

==== 2013–14 season ====
Celeban scored Vaslui's first goal of the season on 5 August against CFR Cluj with a 4th-minute header from Adrian Sălăgeanu's corner. The final score was established in the 33rd minute as 4–0. On 19 August, Celeban scored against Săgeata Năvodari at Municipal, with a 26th-minute header giving Vaslui a 1–0 win.

== Career statistics ==
=== Club ===
Appearances and goals by club, season and competition
Club	Season	League			National cup (Note: Includes Polish Cup, Cupa României)		League cup (Note: Includes Ekstraklasa Cup)		Europe		Other		Total	
Club	Season	Division	Apps	Goals	Apps	Goals	Apps	Goals	Apps	Goals	Apps	Goals	Apps	Goals
Pogoń Szczecin	2004–05	Ekstraklasa	1	0	0	0	—		—		—		1	0
Pogoń Szczecin	2005–06	Ekstraklasa	6	1	3	0	—		1 (Note: Appearance in UEFA Intertoto Cup)	0	—		10	1
Pogoń Szczecin	2006–07	Ekstraklasa	26	3	2	1	4	0	—		—		32	4
Pogoń Szczecin	Total		33	4	5	1	4	0	1	0	—		43	6
Śląsk Wrocław (loan)	2005–06	II liga	16	2	—		—		—		—		16	2
Korona Kielce	2007–08	Ekstraklasa	13	0	0	0	5	0	—		—		18	0
Śląsk Wrocław	2008–09	Ekstraklasa	30	2	1	0	11	2	—		—		42	4
Śląsk Wrocław	2009–10	Ekstraklasa	25	2	1	0	—		—		—		26	2
Śląsk Wrocław	2010–11	Ekstraklasa	30	4	2	0	—		—		—		32	4
Śląsk Wrocław	2011–12	Ekstraklasa	29	6	3	0	—		5 (Note: Appearances in UEFA Europa League)	0	—		37	6
Śląsk Wrocław	Total		114	14	7	0	11	2	5	0	—		137	16
Vaslui	2012–13	Liga I	29	7	0	0	—		2	0	—		31	7
Vaslui	2013–14	Liga I	26	4	2	2	—		—		—		28	6
Vaslui	Total		55	11	2	2	—		2	0	—		59	13
Śląsk Wrocław	2014–15	Ekstraklasa	37	2	3	0	—		—		—		40	2
Śląsk Wrocław	2015–16	Ekstraklasa	36	2	4	1	—		4	0	—		44	3
Śląsk Wrocław	2016–17	Ekstraklasa	37	3	2	0	—		—		—		39	3
Śląsk Wrocław	2017–18	Ekstraklasa	37	5	1	0	—		—		—		38	5
Śląsk Wrocław	2018–19	Ekstraklasa	30	3	1	0	—		—		—		31	3
Śląsk Wrocław	2019–20	Ekstraklasa	7	0	1	0	—		—		—		8	0
Śląsk Wrocław	2020–21	Ekstraklasa	14	2	1	1	—		—		—		15	3
Śląsk Wrocław	Total		198	17	13	2	—		4	0	—		215	19
Śląsk Wrocław II	2019–20	III liga, gr. III	4	0	0	0	—		—		—		4	0
Śląsk Wrocław II	2020–21	III liga, gr. III	6	0	0	0	—		—		—		6	0
Śląsk Wrocław II	2021–22	II liga	20	1	1	0	—		—		—		21	1
Śląsk Wrocław II	Total		30	1	1	0	—		—		—		31	1
Careet total			469	49	28	5	15	2	12	0	0	0	524	56

== International career ==
Celeban debuted for the Poland national team in an 1–0 friendly win over Serbia on December 14, 2008.

== Honours ==
Śląsk Wrocław

- Ekstraklasa: 2011–12
- Ekstraklasa Cup: 2008–09

Śląsk Wrocław II

- III liga, group III: 2019–20

Individual

- Ekstraklasa Player of the Month: October 2011, July 2018
- Vaslui Player of the Season: 2012–13
- Ekstraklasa Hall of Fame: 2023

== Family ==
Celeban's brother Adam is also a professional football player who plays for Pogoń Szczecin.
