= Krzysztof Wołczek =

Polish footballer and manager

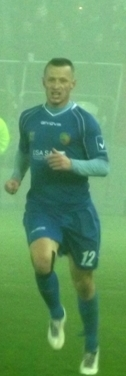
- Wołczek with Miedź Legnica in 2012

Personal information
- Full name: Krzysztof Wołczek
- Date of birth: 17 April 1979 (age 47)
- Place of birth: Wrocław, Poland
- Height: 1.80 m (5 ft 11 in)
- Position: Defender

Senior career*
| Years | Team | Apps | (Gls) |
- Śląsk Wrocław
| 1994–1996 | Wratislavia Wrocław | | |
| 1996–1997 | Ślęza Wrocław | | |
| 1998–1999 | Zagłębie Lubin | 1 | (0) |
| 2000 | Miedź Legnica | | |
| 2001 | Chrobry Głogów | | |
| 2001 | Zagłębie Lubin | 4 | (0) |
| 2001–2002 | Świt Nowy Dwór Mazowiecki | | |
| 2002 | Zagłębie Lubin | 0 | (0) |
| 2003 | Pogoń Staszów | | |
| 2003–2004 | Aluminium Konin | 21 | (0) |
| 2004–2012 | Śląsk Wrocław | 115 | (3) |
| 2012–2014 | Miedź Legnica | 50 | (3) |
| 2014–2016 | GKS Kobierzyce | | |
| 2016–2017 | Polonia Trzebnica | | |

Managerial career
- 2020–2021: Śląsk Wrocław U19
- 2021–2022: Śląsk Wrocław II
- 2022–2023: Śląsk Wrocław II
- 2024: Śląsk Wrocław II (caretaker)
- * Club domestic league appearances and goals

Krzysztof Wołczek (born 17 April 1979) is a Polish professional football manager and former player who was most recently the youth coordinator of Śląsk Wrocław's academy.

== Club career ==
At the beginning of his career, Wołczek played for his current club Śląsk Wrocław and next Wratislavia Wrocław. Then he moved to Ślęza Wrocław. Next he played for Zagłębie Lubin. In 2000, he moved to Miedź Legnica. In 2001, he played for Chrobry Głogów and again Zagłębie Lubin. Then he moved to Świt Nowy Dwór Mazowiecki. He returned to Zagłębie Lubin in 2002. In 2003, he played for Pogoń Staszow. In 2004, he moved to his native club Śląsk Wrocław. He ended his football career in 2017 in Polonia Trzebnica.

== Managerial career ==
On 22 March 2021, he was announced the assistant coach of Jacek Magiera in Śląsk Wrocław. On 19 June 2021, he became the manager of their second-league reserves. On 9 March 2022, he joined Piotr Tworek's staff as an assistant of the senior team. Following Tworek's dismissal at the end of the season, Wołczek returned to his previous post on 17 June 2022.

Following the 2022–23 season, he was moved to the role of coordinator for age groups from under-14 to under-19. On 14 November 2024, after most of reserves' coaching staff was promoted to the first team, Wołczek was appointed Śląsk II's manager on caretaker basis. He resumed his previous duties on 24 December 2024, following Michał Hetel's return to the reserves. Wołczek left the club on 12 January 2026.

== Managerial statistics ==
As of match played 27 November 2024

Managerial record by team and tenure
| Team | From | To | Record | | | | | | | |
| Team | From | To | G | W | D | L | GF | GA | GD | Win % |
|---|---|---|---|---|---|---|---|---|---|---|
| Śląsk Wrocław II | 19 June 2021 | 9 March 2022 | 23 | 9 | 5 | 9 | 38 | 36 | +2 | 39.13 |
| Śląsk Wrocław II | 17 June 2022 | 30 June 2023 | 35 | 8 | 7 | 20 | 40 | 61 | −21 | 22.86 |
| Śląsk Wrocław II (caretaker) | 14 November 2024 | 24 December 2024 | 2 | 1 | 1 | 0 | 3 | 1 | +2 | 50.00 |
| Total | | | 60 | 18 | 13 | 29 | 81 | 98 | −17 | 30.00 |

== Honours ==
Śląsk Wrocław

- Ekstraklasa: 2011–12
- Ekstraklasa Cup: 2008–09

Polonia Trzebnica

- Regional league Wrocław: 2016–17
