= Dariusz Sztylka =

Polish footballer

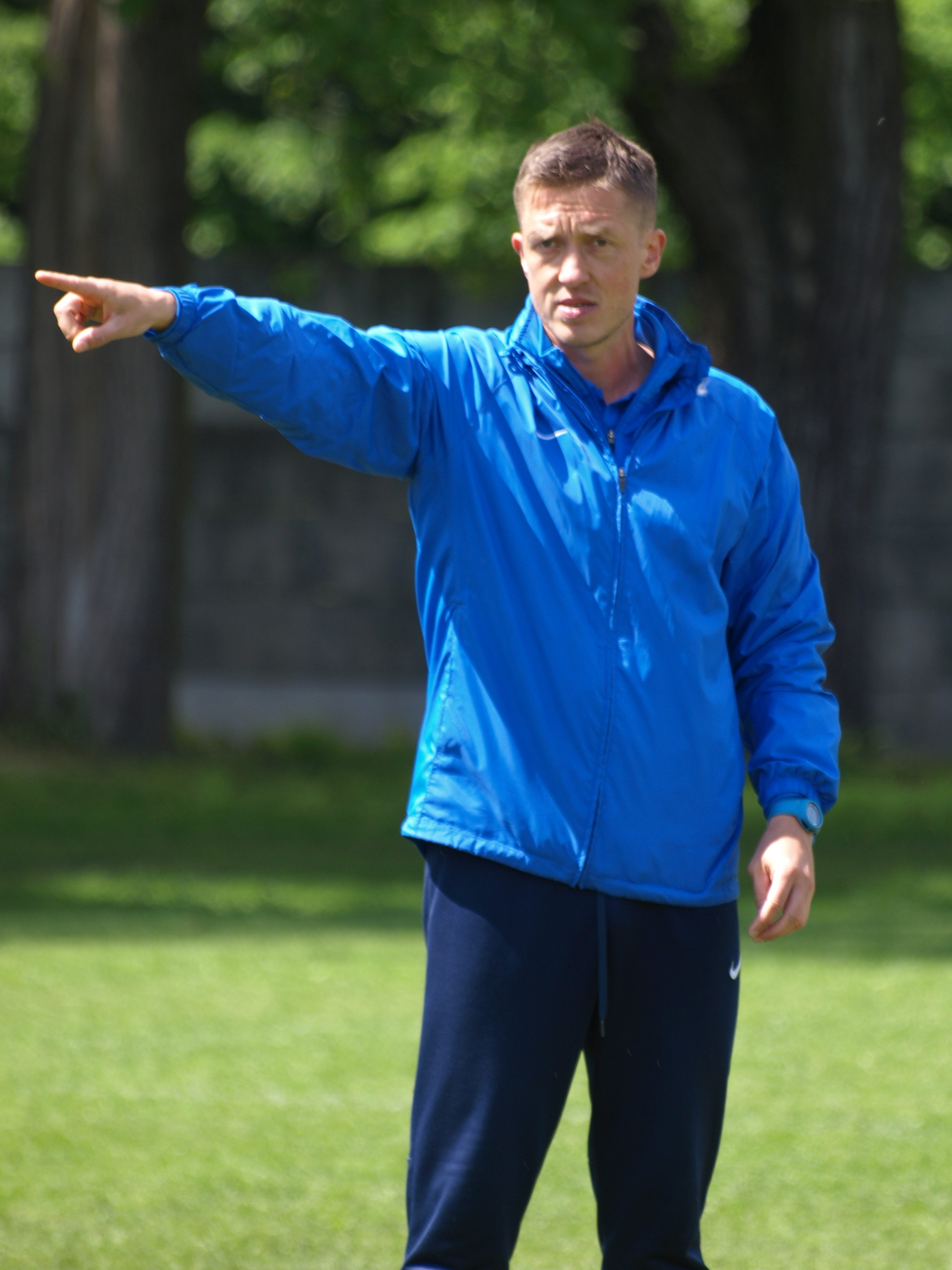
- Sztylka in 2014

Personal information
- Full name: Dariusz Sztylka
- Date of birth: 28 May 1978 (age 48)
- Place of birth: Wrocław, Poland
- Height: 1.88 m (6 ft 2 in)
- Position: Midfielder

Team information
- Current team: Odra Opole (sporting director)

Youth career
- –1996: Wratislavia Wrocław

Senior career*
Years	Team	Apps	(Gls)
1996–1997	Ślęza Wrocław		
1997–1998	Zagłębie Lubin	0	(0)
1998	→ Polar Wrocław (loan)		
1999–2000	Polar Wrocław	52	(8)
2001–2012	Śląsk Wrocław	212	(14)

Managerial career
- 2017: Śląsk Wrocław II
- 2017–2018: Śląsk Wrocław U19
- * Club domestic league appearances and goals

Dariusz Sztylka (born 28 May 1978) is a Polish former professional footballer who played as a midfielder. He is currently the sporting director of I liga club Odra Opole.

He spent most of his career at Śląsk Wrocław, and went on to hold various roles within the club following retirement, starting off as assistant manager before managing reserve and youth sides, then serving as the sporting director from 2018 until 2023. He then held the same role at Wisła Płock before returning to Śląsk in the same capacity in July 2025, and leaving in January the following year. He joined Odra Opole's management staff in May 2026.

== Career ==
At the beginning of his career, Sztylka played for Wratislavia Wrocław and Ślęza Wrocław, before moving to Zagłębie Lubin in 1997. Soon after, he was loaned to Polar Wrocław. In 1999, he joined Polar on a permanent basis, before moving to Śląsk Wrocław in 2001, where he stayed for eleven years.

He initially announced his retirement on 30 May 2011, before changing his mind two weeks later and continuing for another season. He retired after the end of the 2011–12 season, on 21 July 2012, as Śląsk were crowned Ekstraklasa champions.

== Managerial statistics ==
As of match played 17 June 2017

Managerial record by team and tenure
Team	From	To	Record							
Team	From	To	G	W	D	L	GF	GA	GD	Win %
Śląsk Wrocław II	9 March 2017	30 June 2017	17	5	2	10	20	22	−2	29.41
Total			17	5	2	10	20	22	−2	29.41

== Honours ==
Śląsk Wrocław

- Ekstraklasa: 2011–12
- Ekstraklasa Cup: 2008–09
