= Mateusz Cetnarski =

Polish footballer (born 1988)

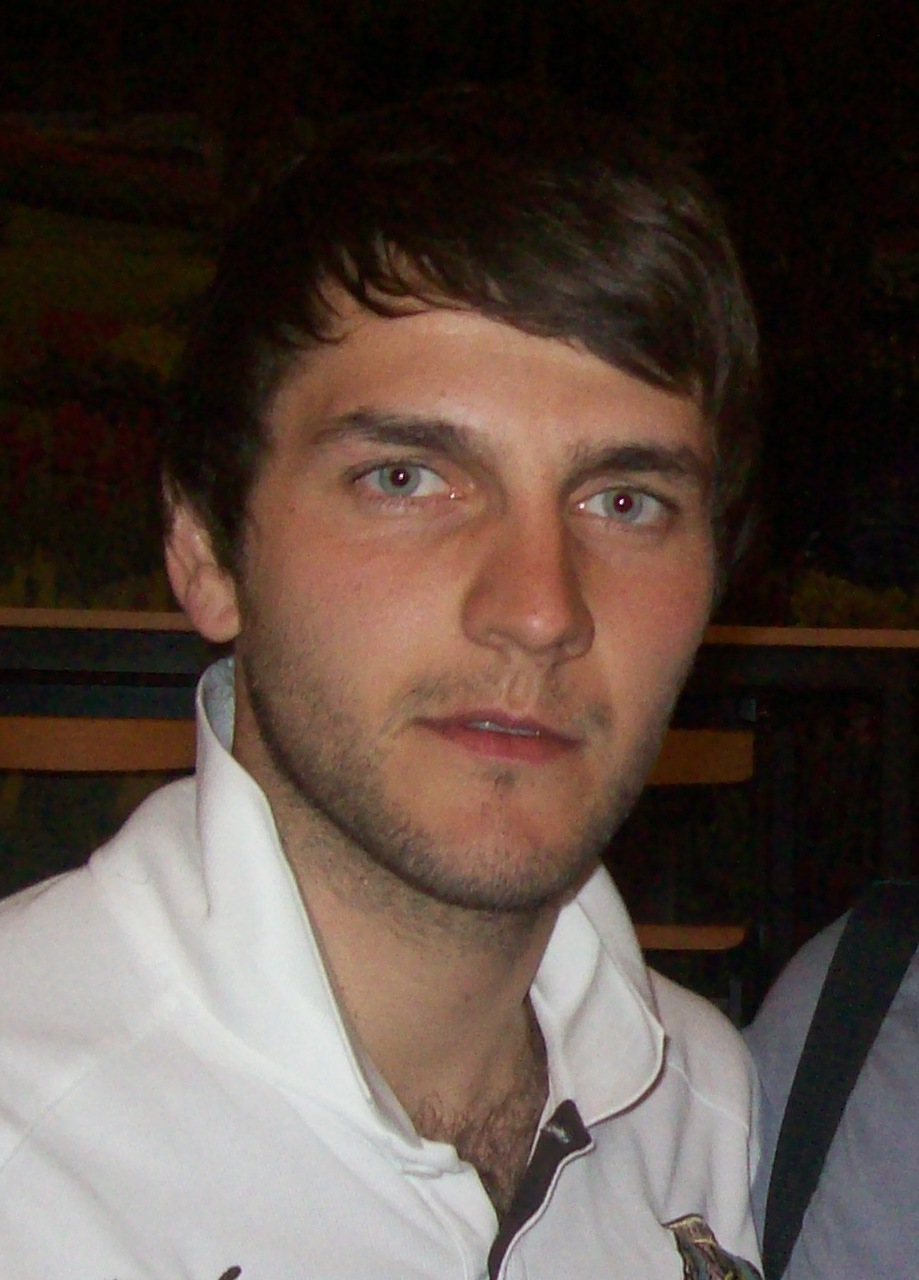

Personal information
- Full name: Mateusz Cetnarski
- Date of birth: 6 July 1988 (age 38)
- Place of birth: Kolbuszowa, Poland
- Height: 1.75 m (5 ft 9 in)
- Position: Midfielder

Youth career
- Kolbuszowianka Kolbuszowa
- UKS SMS Łódź

Senior career*
Years	Team	Apps	(Gls)
2007–2011	GKS Bełchatów	83	(8)
2011–2013	Śląsk Wrocław	42	(5)
2013–2014	Widzew Łódź	16	(4)
2014–2018	Cracovia	79	(16)
2017–2018	→ Sandecja Nowy Sącz (loan)	16	(2)
2019	Górnik Łęczna	6	(0)
2019–2020	Stomil Olsztyn	10	(0)
2020	FK Tukums 2000	10	(0)
2020–2021	Korona Kielce	11	(0)
2021	Pili Pili DB Jambiani		

International career
2008–2010	Poland U21	12	(2)
2010	Poland	2	(0)

Managerial career
- 2021: Pili Pili DB Jambiani (player-manager)
- * Club domestic league appearances and goals

Mateusz Cetnarski (born 6 July 1988) is a Polish former professional footballer who played as a midfielder.

== Career ==
=== Club ===
In June 2011, he joined Śląsk Wrocław on a three-year contract. On 3 July 2017 he was loaned from Cracovia to Sandecja Nowy Sącz. On 11 August 2020 he signed with Korona Kielce. On 21 February 2021 he signed with the Zanzibari second-tier club Pili Pili DB Jambiani (as a player-coach).

He retired from football in 2021.

=== National team ===
He made his national debut on 2 June 2010 against Serbia.

== Honours ==
Śląsk Wrocław

- Ekstraklasa: 2011–12
- Polish Super Cup: 2012

Individual

- Ekstraklasa Player of the Month: November 2015
