= Łukasz Madej =

Polish footballer (born 1982)

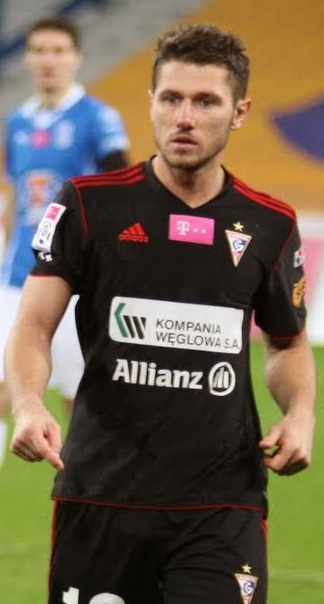

Personal information
- Full name: Łukasz Madej
- Date of birth: 14 April 1982 (age 44)
- Place of birth: Łódź, Poland
- Height: 1.76 m (5 ft 9 in)
- Position: Midfielder

Senior career*
Years	Team	Apps	(Gls)
1996–2000	ŁKS Łódź	32	(3)
2001–2002	Ruch Chorzów	26	(1)
2002–2004	Lech Poznań	63	(6)
2005	Górnik Łęczna	17	(1)
2006–2008	ŁKS Łódź	72	(10)
2008–2009	Académica de Coimbra	6	(0)
2009–2012	Śląsk Wrocław	63	(7)
2012–2013	GKS Bełchatów	24	(3)
2013–2016	Górnik Zabrze	101	(9)
2016–2017	Śląsk Wrocław	48	(1)
Total		452	(41)

International career
2003–2017	Poland	5	(0)
Medal record
Men's football
Representing Poland
UEFA European Under-18 Championship
Winner	2001 Finland
UEFA European Under-16 Championship
Runner-up	1999 Czech Republic
- * Club domestic league appearances and goals

Łukasz Madej (born 14 April 1982) is a Polish former professional footballer who played as a midfielder.

== Career ==
Madej started his career with ŁKS Łódź.

== International career ==
Madej has made five appearances for the senior Poland national team.

== Honours ==
Lech Poznań

- Polish Cup: 2003–04
- Polish Super Cup: 2004

Śląsk Wrocław

- Ekstraklasa: 2011–12

Poland U16

- UEFA European Under-16 Championship runner-up: 1999

Poland U18

- UEFA European Under-18 Championship: 2001
