= Cristian Díaz (footballer, born 1986) =

Argentine footballer

Cristián Díaz
Personal information
- Full name: Cristián Omar Díaz
- Date of birth: 3 November 1986 (age 39)
- Place of birth: San Miguel de Tucumán, Argentina
- Height: 1.83 m (6 ft 0 in)
- Position: Striker

Senior career*
Years	Team	Apps	(Gls)
2005–2006	Club Gimnasia y Esgrima		
2006–2007	Boca Unidos		
2008	Central Norte		
2008	CSyD La Florida		
2009–2010	San José	48	(35)
2010–2014	Śląsk Wrocław	52	(15)
2014	Real Potosí	12	(5)
2014–2015	San José	10	(1)
2015	Deportivo Morón	2	(0)
2016	San Jorge de Tucumán	2	(0)
2021	Atlántico FC	2	(0)
2024–2025	Sparta Będkowo	26	(13)
2025	Błyskawica Lenartowice	4	(1)
- * Club domestic league appearances and goals as of 13:29, 8 September 2026 (UTC)

Cristián Omar Díaz (born 3 November 1986) is an Argentine footballer who plays as a forward.

== Career ==
Among his achievements, he finished as the league's topscorer in the 2010 Apertura tournament playing for San José with 18 goals.

In July 2010, he joined Śląsk Wrocław on a two-year contract.

== Honours ==
Śląsk Wrocław

- Ekstraklasa: 2011–12
- Polish Super Cup: 2012

Sparta Będkowo

- Klasa A Wrocław II: 2024–25
- Klasa B Wrocław II: 2023–24

Individual

- Bolivian Primera División top scorer: 2010 Apertura
