= Bartłomiej Konieczny =

Polish footballer

Personal information
- Date of birth: 9 June 1981 (age 45)
- Place of birth: Skwierzyna, Poland
- Height: 1.93 m (6 ft 4 in)
- Position: Defender

Youth career
- Zjednoczeni Przytoczna

Senior career*
Years	Team	Apps	(Gls)
2000–2004	Amica Wronki	5	(0)
2004	Warta Poznań		
2005	Kania Gostyń		
2005–2006	Widzew Łódź	38	(2)
2007	Górnik Polkowice	15	(1)
2007–2008	Polonia Warsaw	31	(1)
2008–2015	Podbeskidzie Bielsko-Biała	159	(7)
- * Club domestic league appearances and goals

Bartłomiej Konieczny (born 9 June 1981) is a Polish former professional footballer who played as a defender.
