= Maciej Mielcarz =

Polish footballer

Personal information
- Full name: Maciej Mielcarz
- Date of birth: 15 October 1980 (age 46)
- Place of birth: Śrem, Poland
- Height: 1.93 m (6 ft 4 in)
- Position: Goalkeeper

Youth career
- 1997–1998: Pogoń Książ Wielkopolski
- 1998–1999: Obra Kościan

Senior career*
Years	Team	Apps	(Gls)
1999	Lech Poznań	1	(0)
2000–2002	Amica Wronki	9	(0)
2002–2003	Górnik Łęczna	32	(0)
2003–2004	Amica Wronki	12	(0)
2005–2008	Korona Kielce	75	(0)
2008–2014	Widzew Łódź	154	(0)
2015–2016	Raków Częstochowa	10	(0)
2016–2023	Warta Sieradz		
- * Club domestic league appearances and goals

Maciej Mielcarz (born 15 October 1980) is a Polish former professional footballer who played as a goalkeeper.

== Career ==
He has represented Poland at U-21 level.

== Personal life ==
His son Oskar (born 2004) is also a professional footballer, playing for Wieczysta Kraków as a goalkeeper.

== Honours ==
Korona Kielce

- II liga: 2004–05

Widzew Łódź

- I liga: 2008–09, 2009–10

Warta Sieradz

- IV liga Łódź: 2016–17,
- Polish Cup (Łódź regionals): 2016–17
