= Przemysław Kaźmierczak =

Polish footballer (born 1982)

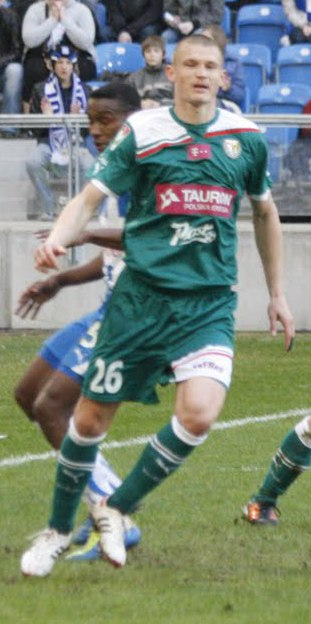
- Kaźmierczak with Śląsk Wrocław in 2012

Personal information
- Full name: Przemysław Tadeusz Kaźmierczak
- Date of birth: 5 May 1982 (age 44)
- Place of birth: Łęczyca, Poland
- Height: 1.91 m (6 ft 3 in)
- Position: Midfielder

Team information
- Current team: Śląsk Wrocław (academy director)

Youth career
- 1990–2000: ŁKS Łódź

Senior career*
Years	Team	Apps	(Gls)
2000–2003	Piotrcovia	26	(8)
2002	→ Górnik Łęczna (loan)	10	(1)
2003–2007	Pogoń Szczecin	73	(10)
2006–2007	→ Boavista (loan)	28	(5)
2007–2010	Porto	11	(0)
2008–2009	→ Derby County (loan)	22	(2)
2009–2010	→ Vitória Setúbal (loan)	28	(4)
2010–2014	Śląsk Wrocław	89	(16)
2014–2015	Górnik Łęczna	8	(0)
Total		295	(46)

International career
2005–2013	Poland	12	(1)
Medal record
Men's football
Representing Poland
UEFA European Under-18 Championship
Winner	2001 Finland
- * Club domestic league appearances and goals

Przemysław Tadeusz Kaźmierczak (Polish pronunciation: [pʂɛ.ˈmɨs.waf kaʑ.ˈmʲɛr.t͡ʂak]; born 5 May 1982) is a Polish former professional footballer who played as a midfielder. Besides Poland, he has played in England and Portugal. He is currently Śląsk Wrocław's academy director.

During a 15-year professional career, he amassed Ekstraklasa totals of 145 games and 21 goals over the course of seven seasons. He also competed professionally in Portugal (three years) and England (one, with Derby County).

== Club career ==
Kaźmierczak was born in Łęczyca. After entering ŁKS Łódź's youth ranks at the age of eight, and spending the following decade there, he started his professional career in 2000 with Piotrcovia Piotrków Trybunalski, playing three seasons with the club.

In 2003 Kaźmierczak moved to Pogoń Szczecin, establishing himself as an Ekstraklasa player. He then served a loan in Portugal with Boavista F.C. during the 2006–07 campaign, where he scored five Primeira Liga goals and played alongside compatriot Rafał Grzelak.

After solid overall displays, Boavista neighbours FC Porto paid Pogoń around €1.4 million to acquire Kaźmierczak's services. He helped the northerners retain their domestic supremacy, but appeared sparingly (11 league games, plus 65 minutes in a 1–4 loss at Liverpool for the group stage of the UEFA Champions League).

Kaźmierczak's disappointing first year at Porto saw him linked with a move away from the club and, on 21 July 2008, he joined English Football League Championship side Derby County on a season-long loan, with a view to a £1.3m permanent deal. After coming on as a substitute he scored his first goal for his new team with a clinical finish against Norwich City, in a 3–1 win.

However, Kaźmierczak fell out of favour under new Derby manager Nigel Clough, and finished the season with 22 league appearances, scoring twice. He later revealed his frustration at being left out of the team, accusing the coach of "not liking foreign [players]", and that "I have made up my mind – I want to leave. It is all over. I am leaving Derby County". Clough responded to the player's accusations, saying "Is that what he said, is it? I have got no problems with foreign players at all. If they have got the right character and they want to fight tooth and nail for Derby County, we will have players whether they are Chinese, American, Spanish – anyone to help us get three points."

On 14 July 2009, Porto arranged for another loan deal for Kaźmierczak, who joined Vitória de Setúbal on a season-long move. The following year he was released and returned to his country, signing for Śląsk Wrocław.

== International career ==
Whilst at Piotrcovia Piotrków, Kaźmierczak was called into the Polish under-18 national team, helping them win the 2001 UEFA European Championship in Finland. He eventually forced his way into the full side following his stint with Boavista, scoring once during UEFA Euro 2008 qualifiers and helping his country qualify for the final stages in Austria and Switzerland, for which he was not finally picked.

== Career statistics ==
=== International ===
Appearances and goals by national team and year
National team	Year	Apps	Goals
Poland
Poland	2005	3	0
Poland	2006	2	0
Poland	2007	4	1
Poland	2012	1	0
Poland	2013	2	0
Total		12	1

Scores and results list Poland's goal tally first, score column indicates score after each Kaźmierczak goal.

List of international goals scored by Przemysław Kaźmierczak
No.	Date	Venue	Opponent	Score	Result	Competition
1	24 March 2007	Polish Army Stadium, Warsaw, Poland	Azerbaijan	5–0	5–0	UEFA Euro 2008 qualifying

== Honours ==
Pogoń Szczecin

- I liga: 2003–04

Porto

- Primeira Liga: 2007–08

Śląsk Wrocław

- Ekstraklasa: 2011–12
- Polish Super Cup: 2012

Poland U18

- UEFA European Under-18 Championship: 2001

Individual

- Ekstraklasa Player of the Month: March 2011
- Ekstraklasa Goal of the Season: 2012–13
