= Amir Spahić =

Bosnian footballer

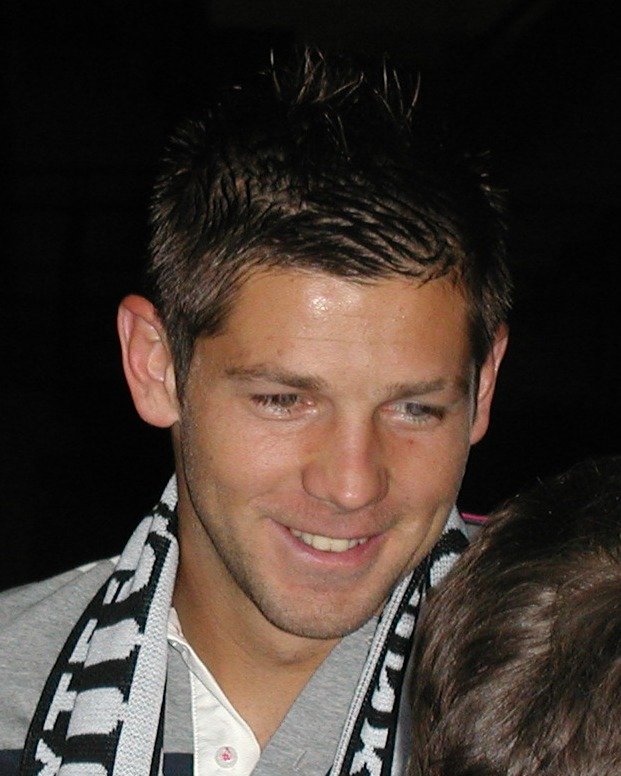
- Spahić with Torpedo in 2008

Personal information
- Full name: Amir Spahić
- Date of birth: 13 September 1983 (age 43)
- Place of birth: Sarajevo, Bosnia and Herzegovina
- Height: 1.87 m (6 ft 2 in)
- Position: Defender

Senior career*
Years	Team	Apps	(Gls)
2002	Austria Wien	0	(0)
2003–2004	Arminia Bielefeld II		
2004	Eisenstadt		
2005	Sloboda Tuzla	13	(0)
2006–2007	Željezničar	30	(1)
2008–2009	Torpedo Moscow	20	(3)
2009–2013	Śląsk Wrocław	65	(1)
- * Club domestic league appearances and goals

Amir Spahić (born 13 September 1983) is a Bosnian former professional footballer who played as a defender.

== Career ==
On 10 July 2009, Spahić moved to Śląsk Wrocław on a free transfer, previously having played for Torpedo Moscow, Željezničar, Arminia Bielefeld II and Austria Wien.

== Personal life ==
Spahić is not related to Emir Spahić or Alen Spahić.

== Honours ==
Śląsk Wrocław

- Ekstraklasa: 2011–12
