= 2015 Knurów riots =

2015 riot in Knurów, Poland

- Date: 2 May 2015-7 May 2015
- Location: Knurów, Poland
- Caused by: killing of Dawid Dziedzic by police
- Goals: Bring to justice the perpetrators of the killing, end police brutality and persecution against football fans
- Methods: Protest, vandalism, chanting, rioting
- Status: dormant, unresolved
- Result: formal investigation commenced

Parties
| Football fans | Police |

Number
| 200 | undetermined |

Casualties
- Death: 1 (Dawid Dziedzic)
- Injuries: Multiple
- Arrested: 46

The 2015 Knurów riots was the biggest unrest among ultras and football fans in Poland since the Słupsk street riots 1998, in protest at the killing of Dawid Dziedzic, a fan at lower league football match by police. Although the rioting has ceased, tensions remained high for several weeks as fans from around the globe continued to publicly condemn the actions of the police.

== History ==
On 2 May 2015, at a Concordia Knurów versus Ruch Radzionków fifth division match in Knurów, police started firing rubber bullets at fans from a close distance after several home fans jumped onto the pitch and ran towards the visiting fans.

A 27-year-old fan of Concordia, Dawid Dziedzic, was shot, and despite attempts to resuscitate him he died shortly in hospital hours later. He was a single father, described as a caring parent from a modest background.

According to the police, the use of such force was justified, whilst the fans said that such a minor infringement of pitch invasion should never be punished by death. Under Polish law, unauthorised entering onto the pitch during a football match is punishable by up to three years in prison. The police reaction has sparked anger among fans, particularly the ultras, with the appeal for support reaching an international appeal. A full court investigation has launched into the incident.

In Knurów around 200 fans have clashed with police outside the police headquarters, with the riots lasting several days. 46 people were arrested, many injured fans as well as policemen.

Thousands of people attended Dawid's funeral on 7 May 2015. Fans lit flares during the ceremony, and the ceremony was conducted in a peaceful manner. The gathering was marked by heavy police presence.

== See also ==
- Football hooliganism in Poland
- Police brutality
- 1998 Słupsk street riots
