= Oporowska Stadium =

Football stadium in Wrocław, Poland

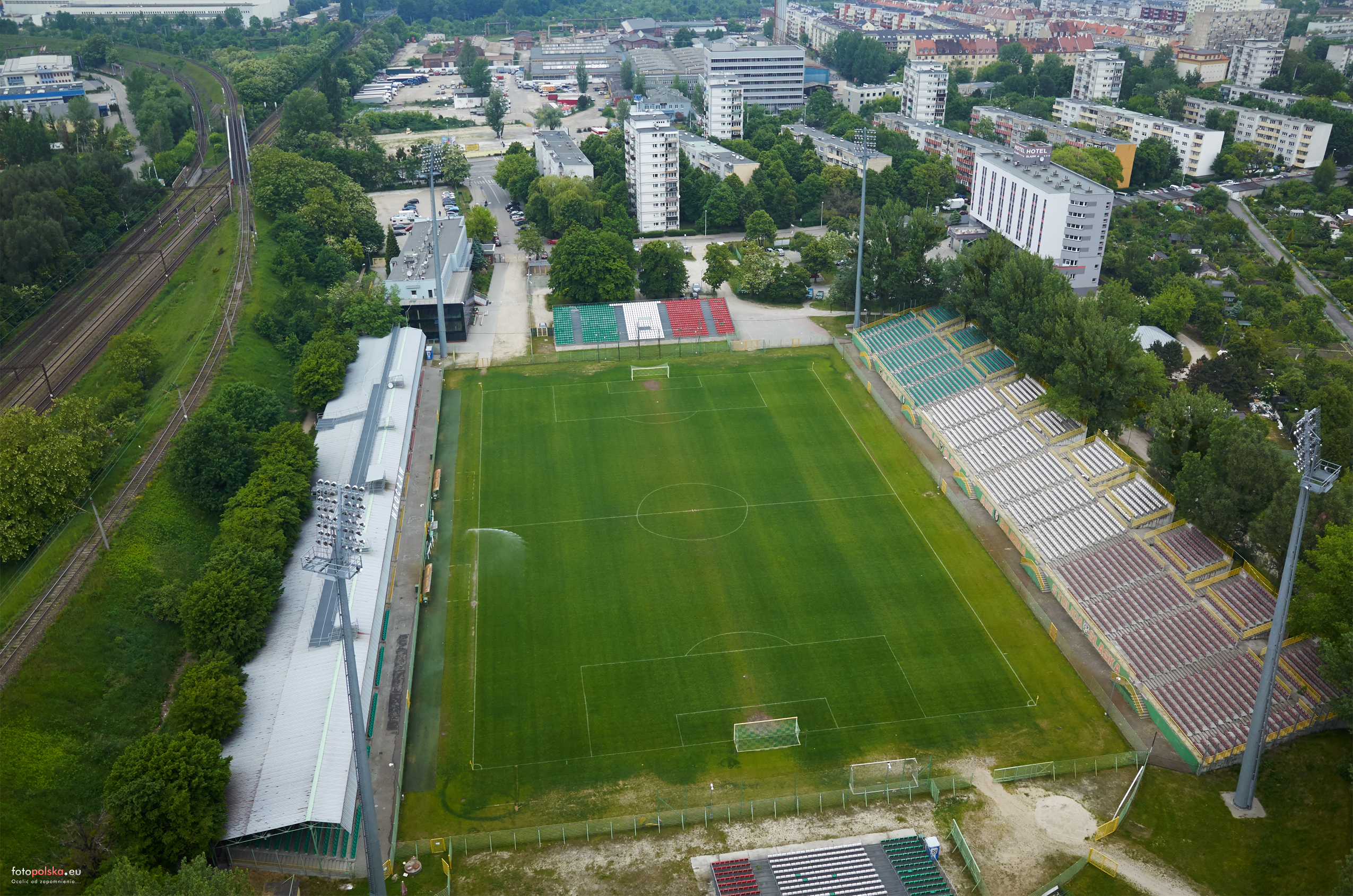
- Interactive map of Oporowska Stadium
- Address: Oporowska 62
- Location: Wrocław, Poland
- Coordinates: 51.096141°N 16.996864°E
- Owner: Śląsk Wrocław
- Capacity: 8,346
- Surface: Grass
- Field size: 105 x 68 meters

Construction
- Opened: 1926

Tenants
- Śląsk Wrocław II; Śląsk Wrocław (women)

The Oporowska Stadium (Polish: Stadion Oporowska) is a football stadium in Wrocław, Poland. It is the former home ground of Śląsk Wrocław, and the current home ground of Śląsk's reserve and women teams. The stadium holds 8,346 spectators.

== Capacity ==
- open stand (eastern): 3,982 seats
- Covered Tribune (western): 2,784 seats
- Grandstand North openwork: 1,104 seats

This gives the 7870 seats for spectators hosts.

- Grandstand South openwork (grandstand for visitors supporters): 476 seats

== Poland national team matches ==
The Poland national football team played one match at the stadium.

Nr	Competition	Date	Opponent	Attendance	Result	Scorers
1.	2010 FIFA World Cup qualification	6 September 2008	Slovenia	8,400	1–1	Żewłakow – Dedić

== See also ==
- 2003 Wrocław football riot
- Stadion Wrocław
