= Łukasz Gikiewicz =

Polish footballer (born 1987)

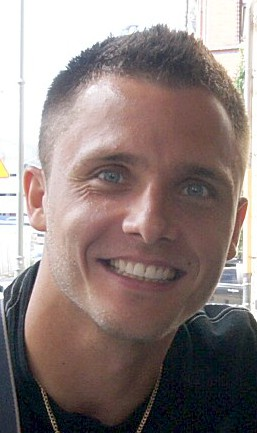
- Gikiewicz in 2012

Personal information
- Full name: Łukasz Szymon Gikiewicz
- Date of birth: 26 October 1987 (age 39)
- Place of birth: Olsztyn, Poland
- Height: 1.89 m (6 ft 2 in)
- Position: Striker

Youth career
- Warmia Olsztyn
- Stomil Olsztyn
- Tempo 25 Olsztyn

Senior career*
Years	Team	Apps	(Gls)
2004–2005	DKS Dobre Miasto		
2005–2006	Motor Lubawa		
2006–2007	KS Drwęca		
2007	Olimpia Elbląg	3	(0)
2007–2008	Wigry Suwałki	16	(3)
2008–2009	Unia Janikowo	17	(1)
2009	Polonia Bytom	6	(1)
2009–2010	ŁKS Łódź	30	(11)
2010–2013	Śląsk Wrocław	55	(9)
2013–2014	Omonia	22	(7)
2014	Tobol	12	(0)
2014–2015	AEL Limassol	10	(3)
2015	Levski Sofia	6	(2)
2015–2016	Al-Wehda	8	(0)
2016–2017	Ratchaburi Mitr Phol	13	(2)
2016	→ Police Tero (loan)	8	(4)
2017–2018	Al-Faisaly	33	(19)
2019	Hajer	14	(2)
2019	FCSB	3	(0)
2020	Al-Faisaly	4	(2)
2020–2021	East Riffa	17	(5)
2021–2022	Chennaiyin	18	(1)
2023	Szturm Junikowo Poznań	14	(23)
2023–2024	KTS Weszło	30	(10)
2024–2025	KS Raszyn	29	(11)
2025	Mazur Karczew	12	(1)
- * Club domestic league appearances and goals as of 10:29, 5 July 2026 (UTC)

Łukasz Szymon Gikiewicz (born 26 October 1987) is a Polish professional footballer who plays as a striker.

== Career ==
Born in Olsztyn, Gikiewicz is youth exponent of Warmia Olsztyn. In March 2009, he moved to Polonia Bytom on two-and-a-half-year contract from Unia Janikowo. In August 2009, he moved to ŁKS Łódź on a one-year deal. In the summer 2010, he joined Śląsk Wrocław on a four-year contract deal. On 27 June 2013, he signed a contract with Cypriot side Omonia.

In March 2014, Gikiewicz signed for Kazakhstan Premier League side FC Tobol.

After spells at Cypriot football clubs Omonia and AEL Limassol, Gikiewicz signed a one-and-a-half-year deal with Levski Sofia in February 2015. On 27 February 2015, he scored on his official A PFG debut, an 8–0 home rout against Haskovo. In April 2015, he was frozen out of the first team after a conflict with manager Stoycho Stoev.

On 5 August 2019, Gikiewicz made his debut for Romanian side FCSB in a 1–2 loss away from home against Astra Giurgiu.

On 21 August 2021, Gikiewicz joined Indian Super League side Chennaiyin on a one-year deal.

On 16 March 2023, he returned to Poland to join regional league club Szturm Junikowo Poznań. Soon after Szturm started experiencing financial difficulties, with players reporting not receiving payments in a timely manner. In the midst of that, Gikiewicz left the club in order to join IV liga side KTS Weszło.

== Personal life ==
Łukasz Gikiewicz's twin brother Rafał Gikiewicz is also a footballer who plays as a goalkeeper.

== Career statistics ==
As of match played 18 August 2019

Appearances and goals by club, season and competition
Club	Season	League			National cup (Note: Includes Polish Cup, Bulgarian Cup, Kazakhstan Cup)		Continental		Other		Total	
Club	Season	Division	Apps	Goals	Apps	Goals	Apps	Goals	Apps	Goals	Apps	Goals
Olimpia Elbląg	2007–08	III liga, gr. I	3	0	—		—		—		3	0
Wigry Suwałki	2007–08	III liga, gr. I	16	3	—		—		—		16	3
Unia Janikowo	2008–09	II liga West	17	1	—		—		—		17	1
Polonia Bytom	2008–09	Ekstraklasa	6	1	—		—		—		6	1
ŁKS Łódź	2009–10	I liga	30	11	1	0	—		—		31	11
Śląsk Wrocław	2010–11	Ekstraklasa	20	2	2	1	—		—		22	3
Śląsk Wrocław	2011–12	Ekstraklasa	12	2	4	0	0	0	—		16	2
Śląsk Wrocław	2012–13	Ekstraklasa	23	5	6	3	5 (Note: Four appearances in UEFA Champions League, one appearance in UEFA Europa League)	0	1 (Note: Appearance in Polish Super Cup)	0	35	8
Śląsk Wrocław	Total		55	9	12	4	5	0	1	0	73	13
Omonia	2013–14	Cypriot First Division	22	7	0	0	2 (Note: Appearance(s) in UEFA Europa League)	1	—		24	8
Tobol	2014	Kazakhstan Premier League	12	0	2	0	—		—		14	0
AEL Limassol	2014–15	Cypriot First Division	10	3	0	0	4 (Note: Two appearances and one goal in UEFA Champions League, two appearances in UEFA Europa League)	1	—		14	4
Levski Sofia	2014–15	A Group	6	2	3	1	—		—		9	3
Al-Wehda	2015–16	Saudi Pro League	8	0	0	0	—		—		8	0
Ratchaburi Mitr Phol	2016	Thai League T1	13	2	0	0	—		—		13	2
Police Tero (loan)	2016	Thai League T1	8	4	—		—		—		8	4
Al-Faisaly	2016–17	Jordanian Pro League	11	5	0	0	—		—		11	5
Al-Faisaly	2017–18	Jordanian Pro League	22	14	0	0	8 (Note: One appearance in AFC Champions League, seven appearances and four goals in AFC Cup)	4	—		30	18
Al-Faisaly	Total		33	19	0	0	8	4	—		41	23
Hajer	2018–19	Saudi First Division League	14	2	—		—		—		14	2
FCSB	2019–20	Liga I	3	0	0	0	1	0	—		4	0
Al-Faisaly	2020	Jordanian Pro League	0	0	0	0	0	0	—		0	0
Career total			256	64	18	5	20	6	1	0	295	75

== Honours ==
Śląsk Wrocław

- Ekstraklasa: 2011–12
- Polish Super Cup: 2012

Al-Faisaly

- Jordan Premier League: 2016–17
- Jordan FA Cup: 2016–17
- Jordan Super Cup: 2017, 2020

Szturm Junikowo

- Regional league Greater Poland II: 2022–23

Weszło Warsaw

- Polish Cup (Warsaw regionals): 2023–24

Individual

- Jordan Premier League top scorer: 2017–18 (14 goals)
