= Dariusz Pietrasiak =

Polish footballer

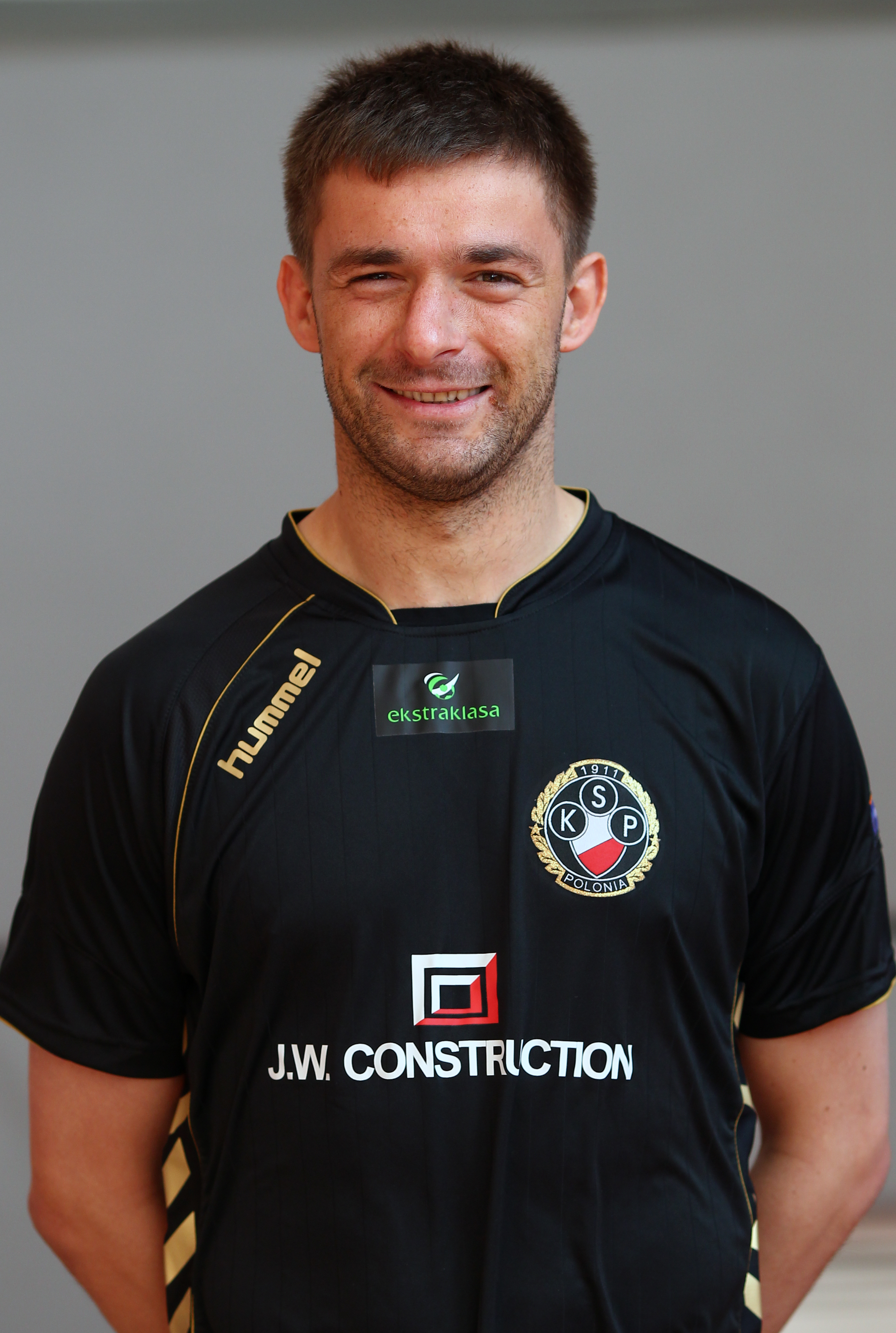
- Pietrasiak with Polonia Warsaw in 2011

Personal information
- Full name: Dariusz Pietrasiak
- Date of birth: 12 February 1980 (age 46)
- Place of birth: Sandomierz, Poland
- Height: 1.86 m (6 ft 1 in)
- Position: Defender

Team information
- Current team: Star Starachowice (manager)

Senior career*
Years	Team	Apps	(Gls)
1998–1999	Cukrownik Włostów		
1999–2003	KSZO Ostrowiec	104	(13)
2003–2010	GKS Bełchatów	156	(10)
2010–2011	Polonia Warsaw	18	(1)
2011–2012	Śląsk Wrocław	23	(1)
2012	Maccabi Netanya	0	(0)
2012–2015	Podbeskidzie	67	(0)
2016	KSZO Ostrowiec	31	(0)

International career
2010	Poland	2	(0)

Managerial career
- 2016: OKS Opatów
- 2016–2017: KSZO Ostrowiec
- 2017: KSZO Ostrowiec (U19)
- 2017: OKS Opatów
- 2017–2018: Alit Ożarów
- 2018–2019: Wisła Sandomierz
- 2019–2021: OKS Opatów
- 2021–2023: Wisła Płock (assistant)
- 2023–2024: Podbeskidzie (assistant)
- 2025: Alit Ożarów
- 2025–: Star Starachowice
- * Club domestic league appearances and goals

Dariusz Pietrasiak (born 12 February 1980) is a Polish professional football manager and former player who played as a defender. He is currently in charge of III liga club Star Starachowice.

== Career ==
=== Club ===
He also played for KSZO Ostrowiec Świętokrzyski and GKS Bełchatów.

In June 2010, he joined Polonia Warsaw on a three-year contract. He was released one year later.

In June 2011, he moved to Śląsk Wrocław on a two-year contract.

After a one-year spell with Śląsk, in July 2012, he agreed to terms with Israeli Premier League side Maccabi Netanya on a one-year contract. He only made a few non-league appearances and was released from Netanya on 27 August.

=== International ===
He has been capped by the Poland national team twice, in games against Australia and United States in 2010.

== Managerial statistics ==
As of match played 29 May 2026

Managerial record by team and tenure
Team	From	To	Record							
Team	From	To	G	W	D	L	GF	GA	GD	Win %
KSZO Ostrowiec	20 December 2016	6 April 2017	5	3	0	2	6	5	+1	60.00
Alit Ożarów	29 June 2017	30 June 2018	37	19	7	11	79	55	+24	51.35
Wisła Sandomierz	1 July 2018	20 April 2019	29	9	5	15	31	51	−20	31.03
OKS Opatów	6 July 2019	14 June 2021	54	16	12	26	76	102	−26	29.63
Alit Ożarów	1 January 2025	4 May 2025	12	4	2	6	13	15	−2	33.33
Star Starachowice	4 May 2025	Present	44	19	12	13	70	61	+9	43.18
Total			181	70	38	73	275	289	−14	38.67

== Honours ==
Śląsk Wrocław

- Ekstraklasa: 2011–12
