= 2009–10 I liga =

I liga
- Season: 2009–10
- Champions: Widzew Łódź
- Promoted: Widzew Łódź; Górnik Zabrze
- Relegated: Wisła Płock; Znicz Pruszków; Motor Lublin; Stal Stalowa Wola
- Matches: 306
- Goals: 752 (2.46 per match)
- Top goalscorer: Marcin Robak (18 goals)
- Biggest home win: Widzew 7–0 Znicz
- Biggest away win: Sandecja 1–6 Widzew
- Highest scoring: Widzew 7–0 Znicz; Sandecja 1–6 Widzew; ŁKS Łódź 5–2 Motor
- Highest attendance: 20,000; Górnik 2–0 Katowice (16 August 2009)
- Lowest attendance: 350; Ząbki 0–0 KSZO (27 March 2010)
- Total attendance: 967,266
- Average attendance: 3,161 ▲17.6%

The 2009–10 I liga was the 62nd season of the second tier domestic division in the Polish football league system since its establishment in 1949 and the 2nd season of the Polish I liga under its current title. The league was operated by the Polish Football Association (PZPN).

The league is contested by 18 teams who competing for promotion to the 2010–11 Ekstraklasa. The regular season was played in a round-robin tournament. The champions and runners-up would receive promotion. Unlike in previous seasons the third-placed team no longer had the opportunity to compete in playoffs for promotion, while the 13th and 14th placed teams no longer had to compete in play-outs to remain in the I liga. The bottom four teams were automatically demoted to the II liga.

The season began on 1 August 2009, and concluded on 9 June 2010. After the 19th matchday the league will be on winter break between 22 November 2009 and 5 March 2010.

Location of teams in 2009–10 I liga

== Changes from last season ==
Promotion and relegation from 2008–09 season. Relegated from Ekstraklasa to I liga:

- Górnik Zabrze
- ŁKS Łódź

Promoted from 2008–09 II liga to I liga:

- KSZO Ostrowiec Świętokrzyski
- MKS Kluczbork
- Pogoń Szczecin
- Sandecja Nowy Sącz

Others

- Widzew Łódź won the I liga in 2008-09 but were relegated for prior corruption, hence remaining in the league. Initially, they were also docked six points, however, this decision was overturned in September.
- Motor Lublin replaced GKS Jastrzębie who were not successful in their application for a license to play in the league.
- ŁKS Łódź, although not deserving it sportingly, were also relegated from the Ekstraklasa due to license problems.

== League table ==
Pos	Team	Pld	W	D	L	GF	GA	GD	Pts	Promotion or relegation
1	Widzew Łódź (P)	34	23	8	3	62	17	+45	77	Promotion to Ekstraklasa
2	Górnik Zabrze (P)	34	18	7	9	47	30	+17	61	Promotion to Ekstraklasa
3	Sandecja Nowy Sącz	34	17	8	9	55	42	+13	59	
4	ŁKS Łódź	34	16	7	11	51	45	+6	55	
5	Pogoń Szczecin	34	13	12	9	46	35	+11	51	
6	MKS Kluczbork	34	12	10	12	43	37	+6	46	
7	Flota Świnoujście	34	12	10	12	33	36	−3	46	
8	KSZO Ostrowiec Świętokrzyski	34	13	7	14	37	46	−9	46	
9	GKP Gorzów Wielkopolski	34	11	12	11	34	33	+1	45	
10	Warta Poznań	34	12	8	14	49	45	+4	44	
11	Górnik Łęczna	34	11	11	12	38	45	−7	44	
12	Podbeskidzie Bielsko-Biała	34	10	14	10	45	38	+7	44	
13	GKS Katowice	34	11	10	13	41	41	0	43	
14	Dolcan Ząbki	34	10	12	12	37	43	−6	42	
15	Wisła Płock (R)	34	9	13	12	43	51	−8	40	Relegation to II liga
16	Znicz Pruszków (R)	34	11	6	17	32	48	−16	39	Relegation to II liga
17	Stal Stalowa Wola (R)	34	5	10	19	32	58	−26	25	Relegation to II liga
18	Motor Lublin (R)	34	4	11	19	27	62	−35	23	Relegation to II liga

Source: soccerway.com
Rules for classification: 1) points; 2) head-to-head points; 3) head-to-head goal difference; 4) head-to-head goals scored; 5) goal difference; 6) number of goals scored.
(P) Promoted; (R) Relegated

== Results ==
Home \ Away	DOL	FLO	GKP	KAT	GKŁ	GÓR	KSZ	ŁKS	KLU	MOL	PBB	POG	SNS	SSW	WAP	WID	WPK	ZNI
Dolcan Ząbki		3–0	3–1	3–2	4–0	0–1	0–0	0–0	1–1	0–1	0–3	1–1	1–1	1–1	1–2	1–0	3–1	2–1
Flota Świnoujście	1–0		2–0	1–0	0–1	0–0	2–1	1–0	1–4	2–0	0–3	1–1	3–0	1–0	1–1	1–1	3–1	1–2
GKP Gorzów Wielkopolski	3–0	1–1		2–0	1–0	1–0	1–1	1–2	1–1	2–2	1–2	1–0	0–0	0–0	2–0	0–0	1–1	2–2
GKS Katowice	0–0	2–1	1–1		0–0	0–0	4–1	4–1	0–1	2–0	0–1	2–2	0–1	1–1	2–0	0–3	0–0	2–0
Górnik Łęczna	1–1	1–0	2–2	1–0		1–1	3–1	1–0	2–1	3–0	2–0	0–3	0–1	2–2	1–2	0–2	0–3	2–1
Górnik Zabrze	1–2	1–1	1–0	2–0	1–0		3–1	1–1	3–2	2–1	1–0	1–3	1–0	3–0	2–3	0–1	1–1	2–0
KSZO Ostrowiec Świętokrzyski	1–0	2–0	0–1	1–1	2–0	2–1		1–0	0–2	1–0	1–0	0–1	3–1	2–0	2–1	0–2	1–1	1–0
ŁKS Łódź	3–0	1–1	2–1	1–2	4–2	1–4	1–0		0–0	5–2	2–2	2–2	1–3	2–1	1–0	1–4	1–0	3–0
MKS Kluczbork	1–1	0–2	1–2	3–0	0–0	0–1	2–1	0–0		0–2	1–3	2–0	1–1	3–0	1–2	2–0	0–0	1–0
Motor Lublin	0–0	1–1	0–1	0–2	0–2	0–3	2–2	0–3	1–0		1–1	3–2	1–4	0–2	1–4	0–0	3–4	1–1
Podbeskidzie Bielsko-Biała	4–0	1–2	0–0	1–3	2–2	0–1	0–1	2–1	1–1	0–0		0–0	1–2	2–2	3–0	0–1	0–0	1–1
Pogoń Szczecin	2–0	0–0	1–0	3–0	2–2	0–2	2–1	0–2	0–1	2–0	2–2		4–0	2–0	1–1	1–2	3–3	1–0
Sandecja Nowy Sącz	2–2	1–0	2–1	1–0	2–2	2–1	3–0	4–1	4–0	2–0	1–1	3–1		3–0	1–1	1–6	2–2	3–1
Stal Stalowa Wola	1–4	2–0	0–1	1–2	1–3	1–3	1–1	2–3	2–2	3–3	2–4	0–0	2–0		1–0	0–1	0–1	3–2
Warta Poznań	1–1	2–0	2–3	3–3	1–1	2–1	6–0	1–2	1–3	2–0	4–1	1–2	1–0	0–0		0–2	2–0	2–3
Widzew Łódź	3–0	0–0	2–0	2–1	0–0	3–0	1–1	2–1	3–2	1–1	2–2	2–1	1–0	3–0	1–0		3–0	7–0
Wisła Płock	3–1	2–1	1–0	3–3	3–1	1–2	1–3	1–2	0–4	1–1	1–1	0–1	2–4	1–0	1–1	0–1		3–1
Znicz Pruszków	0–1	1–2	1–0	0–2	2–0	0–0	3–2	0–1	2–0	2–0	0–1	0–0	1–0	2–1	1–0	1–0	1–1	

Source: 90minut.pl (in Polish)
Legend: Blue = home team win; Yellow = draw; Red = away team win.

== Season statistics ==
=== Top scorers ===
Rank	Player	Club	Goals
1	(Poland) Marcin Robak	Widzew Łódź	18
2	(Poland) Piotr Reiss	Warta Poznań	16
2	(Poland) Adrian Świątek	ŁKS Łódź / Górnik Zabrze	16
4	(Poland) Marcin Klatt	Warta Poznań / Pogoń Szczecin	13
4	(Poland) Olgierd Moskalewicz	Pogoń Szczecin	13
4	(Lithuania) Darvydas Šernas	Widzew Łódź	13
7	(Poland) Maciej Tataj	Dolcan Ząbki / Korona Kielce	12
8	(Poland) Dariusz Gawęcki	Sandecja Nowy Sącz	11
8	(Poland) Łukasz Gikiewicz	ŁKS Łódź	11
8	(Poland) Daniel Koczon	Wisła Płock	11
8	(Poland) Waldemar Sobota	MKS Kluczbork	11
12	(Poland) Adam Cieśliński	KSZO Ostrowiec Świętokrzyski	10
12	(Poland) Sylwester Patejuk	Podbeskidzie Bielsko-Biała	10
