= Johan Voskamp =

Dutch footballer (born 1984)

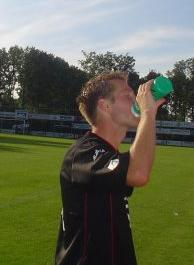

Personal information
- Full name: Johan Voskamp
- Date of birth: 15 October 1984 (age 42)
- Place of birth: De Lier, Netherlands
- Height: 1.93 m (6 ft 4 in)
- Position: Striker

Youth career
- Lyra
- Westlandia

Senior career*
Years	Team	Apps	(Gls)
2005–2009	Excelsior	95	(25)
2009	→ RKC	13	(3)
2009–2010	Helmond Sport	34	(22)
2010–2011	Sparta	31	(29)
2011–2013	Śląsk Wrocław	24	(6)
2013–2016	Sparta	59	(24)
2016–2018	RKC	59	(20)
2018–2019	Westlandia		
2019–2020	Lyra		
- * Club domestic league appearances and goals

Johan Voskamp (Dutch pronunciation: [ˈjoːɦɑɱ ˈvɔskɑmp]; born 15 October 1984) is a Dutch former professional footballer who played as a striker.

== Career ==
Voskamp has previously played for Helmond Sport, Excelsior Rotterdam and RKC Waalwijk. He signed for relegated Jupiler League side Sparta Rotterdam ahead of the 2010–11 campaign, but missed the club's first game of the season, a 2–1 win away at Go Ahead Eagles. He made his debut a week later against newly named Almere City, scoring eight goals on his debut in a 12–1 win. He ended up the league's top goalscorer in what was a dismal season for the Rotterdammers.

In July 2011, he joined Śląsk Wrocław on a three-year contract. He made his debut on 14 July as a substitute against Dundee United in the Europa League second qualifying round first leg and scored the only goal of the game giving his team a 1–0 win.

On 31 July 2011 he debuted, yet again as a substitute, in the Ekstraklasa, where he scored a goal securing his team a 1–1 against Górnik Zabrze.

On 7 June 2013, Voskamp signed a three-year contract with his former team Sparta Rotterdam. In 2018, Voskamp ended his professional career and returned to amateur side Westlandia.

== Honours ==
Śląsk Wrocław

- Ekstraklasa: 2011–12
- Polish Super Cup: 2012

Sparta Rotterdam

- Eerste Divisie: 2015-16
