= Grzegorz Arłukowicz =

Polish footballer

Personal information
- Full name: Grzegorz Arłukowicz
- Date of birth: 11 February 1992 (age 34)
- Place of birth: Łomża, Poland
- Height: 1.74 m (5 ft 9 in)
- Position: Midfielder

Team information
- Current team: Jagiellonia Białystok (fitness coach)

Youth career
- 2007–2011: Jagiellonia Białystok

Senior career*
Years	Team	Apps	(Gls)
2011–2014	Jagiellonia Białystok	5	(0)
2012–2013	→ Kolejarz Stróże (loan)	15	(0)
2013	Jagiellonia Białystok II	15	(0)
2014	→ Zagłębie Sosnowiec (loan)	8	(0)
2014–2015	Polonia Warsaw	14	(1)
2021	Jagiellonia Białystok II	3	(0)
Total		60	(1)
- * Club domestic league appearances and goals

Grzegorz Arłukowicz (born 11 February 1992) is a Polish former professional footballer who played as a midfielder. He currently works as a fitness coach for Ekstraklasa club Jagiellonia Białystok.
