= Rafał Grodzicki =

Polish footballer

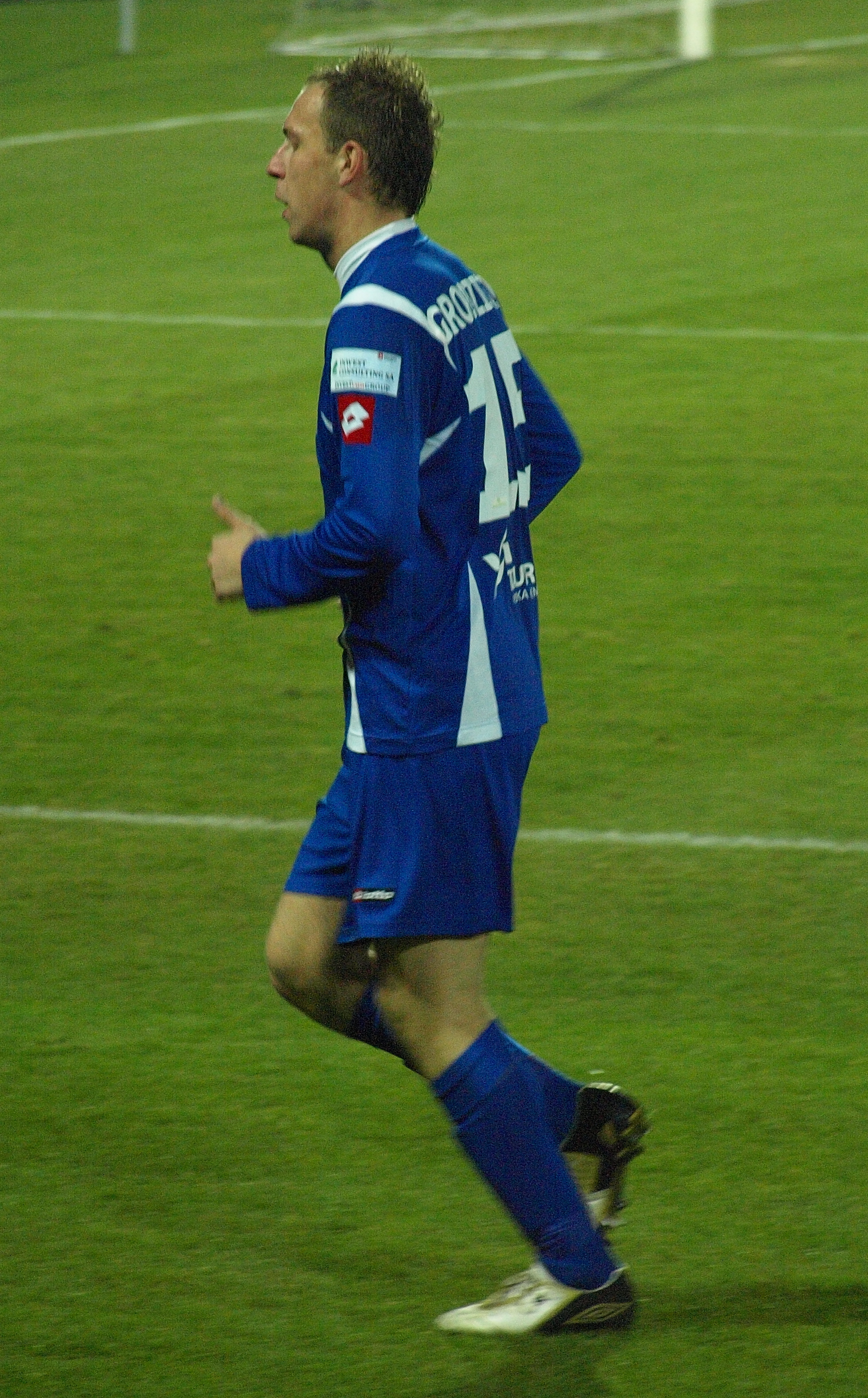
- Grodzicki with Ruch Chorzów in 2009

Personal information
- Date of birth: 28 October 1983 (age 43)
- Place of birth: Kraków, Poland
- Height: 1.92 m (6 ft 4 in)
- Position: Centre-back

Senior career*
Years	Team	Apps	(Gls)
- Zwierzyniecki KS Kraków
1999–2002	Cracovia		
2003	LKS Niedźwiedź		
2003–2005	Górnik Wieliczka		
2006–2008	GKS Bełchatów	32	(0)
2008–2012	Ruch Chorzów	111	(3)
2012–2015	Śląsk Wrocław	44	(2)
2015–2017	Ruch Chorzów	77	(4)
2017–2019	Stal Mielec	42	(0)
2019–2021	Motor Lublin	48	(0)
2021–2023	Jutrzenka Giebułtów	40	(11)
- * Club domestic league appearances and goals

Rafał Grodzicki (born 28 October 1983) is a Polish football executive and former professional player who played as a centre-back. He was most recently the sporting director of Ekstraklasa club Śląsk Wrocław.

In the final years of his playing career, Grodzicki joined TVP Sport as a pundit and co-commentator.

From May 2023 to December 2023, he was the sporting manager of Ekstraklasa club Warta Poznań. On 12 November 2024, he took on the role of sporting director at his former club Śląsk Wrocław, replacing David Balda. At the conclusion of the 2024–25 season, he was moved to the position of scouting director. On 12 January 2026, he was moved into the role of sporting director. After the sacking of manager Ante Šimundža and reported disagreements with Śląsk's chairman Remigiusz Jezierski over his replacement, Grodzicki left Śląsk on 3 November 2026.

== Honours ==
Motor Lublin

- III liga, group IV: 2019–20
