= 1998 Słupsk street riots =

Anti-police violence riot in Poland

Słupsk street riots
- Date: 10-14 January 1998
- Location: Słupsk, Słupsk Voivodeship, Third Polish Republic
- Caused by: Police murder
- Goals: Oppose police violence
- Methods: Rioting

Casualties
- Death: 1
- Injuries: 72
- Arrested: 239
- Detained: 84
- Charged: 283

On Saturday, January 10, 1998, a basketball derby game between the teams of Czarni Słupsk and AZS Koszalin took place in the northern Polish city of Słupsk.

== History ==
After the match, hundreds of fans were peacefully returning home. At the intersection on Szczecińska Street, a group of 12 people decided to cross the street on a red light. This was noticed by nearby policemen in a patrol vehicle, Dariusz Woźniak and Robert K. The group noticed the police vehicle and allegedly began to run away. Woźniak caught up to a member of the group, a 13-year-old child named Przemysław Czaja, and repeatedly hit his head and neck using his baton. The unprovoked violence was witnessed by tens of people. Despite pleas, the policemen did not call an ambulance for the unconscious Czaja, who was lying on the sidewalk. At 8:20 p.m., the victim died, it later turned out that the death had been caused by haemorrhage.

News about the incident spread quickly around the city and the next morning, Sunday January 11, a group of supporters of Słupsk's two sports clubs, Czarni Słupsk and Gryf Słupsk, gathered on Szczecińska Street, to erect a cross there. At about midday the mourners moved to the vicinity of the local prosecutor's office, demanding punishment of the responsible officer, who was being questioned inside the building. At about 4 p.m. the prosecutor issued a statement claiming that the victim had stumbled while running away and hit his head against a trolleybus traction post, which had caused the death. The same day, Woźniak was temporarily arrested, but then bailed by the local police union.

The first skirmishes occurred at 8 p.m. An angry crowd, chanting śmierć za śmierć (transl. blood for blood), and comparing the police's actions to those of Gestapo and Milicja Obywatelska, erected barricades in the centre of the city and started to hurl rocks at police. The night of January 11–12 was very violent. Hundreds of rioters attacked police stations and destroyed 22 police vehicles. The police responded with tear gas. For the next three days Słupsk was marred by violent fights and, as the local police department was unable to subdue the rioters, reinforcements were called from neighboring cities. Finally, on Wednesday, January 14, the protest was suppressed by some 1000 policemen patrolling the streets.

According to the Słupsk police, 239 adults were detained and 84 were taken into custody. The local magistrate court received 251 delinquency motions, and the juvenile court took up 32 cases. 72 police officers were injured, two of whom were hospitalised.

In 2001 Dariusz W., the officer who murdered the Czaja, was sentenced to 8 years in prison. However, he was released after 4 years due to poor health. Another officer, Robert K., who was sitting in a cruiser during the incident, was accused of failing to help the victim and sentenced to 8 months in prison.

In September 2005 the Circuit Court in Gdańsk decided that the family of the victim would get compensation in the amount of 300 000 PLN (around $100 000), paid by the Słupsk Police Department.

The murder was the most notable case of police brutality in Poland after the fall of communism.

== Sources ==
- (in Polish) A Gazeta Wyborcza daily article describing the event,
- (in Polish) Interview with Senator Zbigniew Romaszewski,
- (in English)
- (in English)
- (in English)
- (in English)

== See also ==
- 2015 Knurów riots
- Police brutality
