= Marek Wasiluk =

Polish footballer

Personal information
- Full name: Marek Wasiluk
- Date of birth: 3 June 1987 (age 39)
- Place of birth: Białystok, Poland
- Height: 1.96 m (6 ft 5 in)
- Position: Centre-back

Team information
- Current team: Legia Warsaw (assistant)

Youth career
- 2002–2004: Jagiellonia Białystok

Senior career*
Years	Team	Apps	(Gls)
2004–2005	Jagiellonia Białystok II		
2005–2008	Jagiellonia Białystok	34	(2)
2008–2011	Cracovia	52	(1)
2011–2013	Śląsk Wrocław	17	(3)
2014	Widzew Łódź	7	(1)
2014	Widzew Łódź II	3	(2)
2014–2018	Jagiellonia Białystok	39	(0)
2014–2017	Jagiellonia Białystok II	14	(0)
2018–2019	Chrobry Głogów	15	(0)
2019–2021	Olimpia Zambrów	19	(1)

Managerial career
- 2020–2022: Jagiellonia Białystok (youth)
- 2022–2024: Jagiellonia Białystok U19
- * Club domestic league appearances and goals

Marek Wasiluk (born 3 June 1987) is a Polish football pundit, co-commentator, manager and former player who played as a centre-back. He currently serves as the assistant coach of Ekstraklasa club Legia Warsaw.

== Career ==
Wasiluk started his career with Jagiellonia Białystok.

In June 2011, he was loaned to Śląsk Wrocław on a half-year deal.

Having joined Chrobry Głogów in the summer of 2018, Wasiluk left the club on 27 August 2019. On 27 September 2019, he signed with Olimpia Zambrów.

== Honours ==
Śląsk Wrocław

- Ekstraklasa: 2011–12
