= Śląsk Wrocław II =

Polish football club

- Nicknames: WKS; Wojskowi (The Militarians)
- Ground: Oporowska Stadium
- Capacity: 8,346
- Owner: Wrocław (99,11%)
- Chairman: Michał Mazur
- Manager: Michał Hetel
- League: II liga
- 2025–26: II liga, 5th of 18
- Website: slaskwroclaw.pl/strona/
Home colours	Away colours

Śląsk Wrocław II is a Polish football team, which serves as the reserve side of Śląsk Wrocław. As of the 2026–27 season, they compete in the II liga.

They play their home games at the Oporowska Stadium.

Śląsk II made their central level Polish Cup debut in the 2021–22 season.

== Players ==
=== Current squad ===
As of 9 September 2026

Note: Flags indicate national team as defined under FIFA eligibility rules; some limited exceptions apply. Players may hold more than one non-FIFA nationality.

No.	Pos.	Nation	Player
—	GK	POL	Dominik Klint
—	GK	POL	Gracjan Korytkowski (vice-captain)
—	GK	POL	Oskar Mielcarz
—	GK	POL	Mikołaj Słodkowski
—	DF	POL	Mateusz Cegliński
—	DF	POL	Kacper Górka
—	DF	POL	Mateusz Krygowski
—	DF	POL	Hubert Muszyński
—	DF	POL	Allen Rozum
—	DF	POL	Szymon Rygiel
—	DF	POL	Mikołaj Tudruj
—	DF	POL	Adrian Żulewski
—	MF	POL	Jan Chodera

No.	Pos.	Nation	Player
—	MF	MLI	Lamine Coulibaly
—	MF	POL	Krzysztof Danielewicz (captain)
—	MF	POL	Jan Janiszewski
—	MF	POL	Igor Kobelczuk
—	MF	POL	Dorian Markowski
—	MF	POL	Konrad Sokołowski
—	MF	POL	Patryk Skrzypczyński
—	MF	POL	Aleksander Wołosowski
—	MF	POL	Łukasz Zajączkowski
—	FW	POL	Dawid Moskaluk
—	FW	POL	Junior Nsangou
—	FW	POL	Maksymilian Stangret

=== Out on loan ===
Note: Flags indicate national team as defined under FIFA eligibility rules; some limited exceptions apply. Players may hold more than one non-FIFA nationality.

No.	Pos.	Nation	Player
—	DF	POL	Jakub Popiela (at AKS 1947 Busko-Zdrój until 30 July 2027)

== Honours ==
- II liga
  - 5th place: 2025–26
- III liga
  - Lower Silesia
    - Runners-up: 2006–07, 2007–08
  - Group III
    - Champions: 2019–20, 2024–25
- IV liga
  - Wrocław
    - Champions: 2005–06
  - Lower Silesia West
    - Champions: 2018–19
    - Runners-up: 2017–18
- Polish Cup (Lower Silesia regionals)
  - Runners-up: 2015–16
- Polish Cup (Wrocław regionals)
  - Winners: 2015–16
  - Runners-up: 2019–20, 2023–24

== Polish Cup records ==
Season	Round	Opponent	Result
2021–22	Round of 64	Zagłębie Lubin	0–3
2022–23	Preliminary round	Motor Lublin	2–4
2023–24	Preliminary round	Chojniczanka Chojnice	0–2
2026–27	Preliminary round	Stal Stalowa Wola	3–2
2026–27	First round	Beskid Andrychów	3–1
2026–27	Round of 32		
