= 2015–16 KS Cracovia (football) season =

KS Cracovia (Polish pronunciation: [kraˈkɔvʲa]) is a Polish sports club based in Kraków.During the 2015–16 campaign they will compete in the following competitions:Ekstraklasa, Polish Cup.

== Current squad ==
As of 26 July 2015

Note: Flags indicate national team as defined under FIFA eligibility rules; some limited exceptions apply. Players may hold more than one non-FIFA nationality.

No.	Pos.	Nation	Player
3	DF	SRB	Sreten Sretenović
5	MF	BIH	Miroslav Čovilo
7	MF	SEN	Boubacar Dialiba
9	FW	POL	Dariusz Zjawiński
10	MF	POL	Mateusz Cetnarski
14	MF	POL	Damian Dąbrowski
17	MF	POL	Mateusz Argasiński (on loan from Stal Stalowa Wola)
19	GK	POL	Krystian Stępniowski
21	DF	POL	Hubert Wołąkiewicz
22	DF	POL	Jakub Wójcicki
23	MF	POL	Łukasz Zejdler
24	DF	POL	Piotr Polczak

No.	Pos.	Nation	Player
25	DF	POL	Bartosz Rymaniak
26	DF	BRA	Deleu
27	MF	POL	Marcin Budziński
29	GK	POL	Grzegorz Sandomierski
32	FW	POL	Krzysztof Szewczyk
44	DF	POL	Paweł Jaroszyński
62	FW	SVK	Erik Jendrišek
67	MF	POL	Bartosz Kapustka
80	GK	POL	Krzysztof Pilarz (captain)
92	FW	LAT	Deniss Rakels
96	MF	POL	Mateusz Wdowiak

== Competitions ==
=== Ekstraklasa ===
17 July 2015 Match 1	Lechia Gdańsk	0–1	Cracovia	Gdańsk
20:30	Łukasik (yellow card) 20'	Summary	Polczak 26' (yellow card) 82'; Kapustka (yellow card) 37'; Čovilo (yellow card) 59'; Dąbrowski (yellow card) 87'	Stadium: PGE Arena Gdańsk; Attendance: 13,143; Referee: (Poland) Szymon Marciniak

24 July 2015 Match 2	Cracovia	1–1	Wisła Kraków	Kraków
20:30	Cetnarski 12'; Dąbrowski (yellow card) 59'; Wójcicki (yellow card) 90'	Summary	Mączyński 3'; Boguski (yellow card) 41'; Burliga (yellow card) 66'; Jović (yellow card) 77'; Głowacki (yellow card) 87'	Stadium: Marshal Józef Piłsudski Stadium; Attendance: 12,933; Referee: (Poland) Krzysztof Jakubik

1 August 2015 Match 3	Podbeskidzie Bielsko-Biała	0–1	Cracovia	Bielsko-Biała
18:00 CET	Kaczmarek (red card) 31'; Sokołowski (yellow card) 45+2'; Kowalski (yellow card) 79'	Summary	Sretenović (yellow card) 42'; Čovilo 54'; Zjawiński (yellow card) 80'	Stadium: Stadion Miejski; Attendance: 4,921; Referee: (Poland) Mariusz Zlotek

7 August 2015 Match 4	Cracovia	1–2	Piast Gliwice	Kraków
18:00 CET	Dibaliba 38'; Wójcicki (yellow card) 69'	Summary	Korun (yellow card) 30'; Mráz 46'; Nešpor 49'	Stadium: Marshal Józef Piłsudski Stadium; Referee: (Poland) Zbigniew Dobryin

14 August 2015 Match 5	Korona Kielce	0–3	Cracovia	Kielce
18:00 CET	Michał Przybyła (yellow card) 45'; Dejmek (yellow card) 90+1'	Summary	Rakels 21'; Cetnarski 45+1'; Kapustka 49'	Stadium: Kielce City Stadium; Attendance: 8,368; Referee: (Poland) Daniel Stefański

22 August 2015 Match 6	Cracovia	1–1	Jagiellonia Białystok	Kraków
20:30 CET	Budziński 28'	Summary	Vassiljev 22'; Álvarinho (yellow card) 66'; Grzelczak (yellow card) 85'; Romanchuk (yellow card) 89'	Stadium: Marshal Józef Piłsudski Stadium; Attendance: 8,112; Referee: (Poland) Mariusz Zlotek

30 August 2015 Match 7	Górnik Zabrze	1–1	Cracovia	Zabrze
15:30 CET	Danch 45+1'; Sobolewski (yellow card) 75'	Summary	Rymaniak (yellow card) 37'; Zjawiński 41'; Wójcicki (yellow card) 45'; Budziński (yellow card) 67'	Stadium: Ernest Pohl Stadium; Attendance: 5,520; Referee: (Poland) Paweł Raczkowski

12 September 2015 Match 8	Cracovia	2–3	LKS Nieciecza	Kraków
18:00 CET	Čovilo 9'; Wójcicki (yellow card) 11'; Zjawiński 43'; Polczak (yellow card) 64'; Sretenović (yellow card) 85'	Summary	Jakub Biskup (yellow card) 8' (goal) 12' (pen.) 30'; Babiarz (yellow card) 51' (goal) 75'; Staňo (yellow card) 85'	Stadium: Marshal Józef Piłsudski Stadium; Attendance: 7,425; Referee: (Poland) Bartosz Frankowski

18 September 2015 Match 9	Zagłębie Lubin	4–2	Cracovia	Lubin
20:30 CET	Sretenović 22' (o.g.); Jarosław Kubicki 56'; Janos 67'; Dąbrowski (yellow card) 68' (goal) 73'	Summary	Cetnarski 66' (pen.); Jendrišek 80'	Stadium: Stadion Zagłębia Lubin; Attendance: 6,258; Referee: (Poland) Marcin Borski

26 September 2015 Match 10	Cracovia	2–1	Ruch Chorzów	Kraków
18:00 CET	Rakels 6', 45+1'	Summary	Stępiński 60'	Stadium: Marshal Józef Piłsudski Stadium; Attendance: 6,235; Referee: (Poland) Paweł Gil

3 October 2015 Match 11	Cracovia	5–2	Lech Poznań	Kraków
18:00 CET	Kapustka 1'; Rakels 3'; Cetnarski 40' (pen.); Jendrišek 63'; Wójcicki 74'	Summary1	Hämäläinen 56' 75'	Stadium: Marshal Józef Piłsudski Stadium; Attendance: 10,324; Referee: (Poland) Daniel Stefański

18 October 2015 Match 12	Legia Warsaw	3–1	Cracovia	Warsaw
18:00 CET	Nikolić 6' 53' 63'; Pazdan (yellow card) 70'	Summary	Deleu (yellow card) 18'; Kapustka (yellow card) 40'; Jendrišek 80'	Stadium: Polish Army Stadium; Attendance: 17,336; Referee: (Poland) Mariusz Zlotek

24 October 2015 Match 13	Cracovia	4–1	Pogoń Szczecin	Kraków
15:30 CET	Cetnarski 48'; Rakels 51' 61'; Budziński 71'	Summary	Zwoliński 56'; Fojut (yellow card) 58'; Małecki (yellow card) 75'	Stadium: Marshal Józef Piłsudski Stadium; Attendance: 8,133; Referee: (Poland) Piotr Lasyk

30 October 2015 Match 14	Górnik Łęczna	1–0	Cracovia	Łęczna
20:30 CET	Bonin 41' (yellow card) 76'; Mierzejewski (yellow card) 90+1'; Piesio (yellow card) 90+4'	Summary	Polczak (yellow card) 27'; Wołąkiewicz (yellow card) 67'; Jaroszyński (yellow card) 82'; Sandomierski (yellow card) 90+4'	Stadium: Stadion Górnika Łęczna; Attendance: 4,009; Referee: (Poland) Paweł Raczkowski

6 November 2015 Match 15	Cracovia	4–1	Śląsk Wrocław	Kraków
20:30 CET	Jendrišek 10' 41'; Rakels 15'; Cetnarski 37'; Dąbrowski (yellow card) 60'; Jaroszyński (yellow card) 86'	Summary	Dankowski (yellow card) 48'; Bartkowiak 52'	Stadium: Marshal Józef Piłsudski Stadium; Attendance: 6,438; Referee: (Poland) Tomasz Kwiatkowski

23 November 2015 Match 16	Cracovia	3–0	Lechia Gdańsk	Kraków
18:00	Polczak (yellow card) 9'; Rakels 59'; Čovilo (yellow card) 68'; Cetnarski 70'; Jendrišek 83'	Summary	Mak (red card) 6'; Marković (yellow card) 80'	Stadium: Marshal Józef Piłsudski Stadium; Attendance: 6,367; Referee: (Poland) Bartosz Frankowski

29 November 2015 Match 17	Wisła Kraków	1–2	Cracovia	Kraków
18:00	Brożek 25'; Głowacki (yellow card) 45'; Sadlok (yellow card) 59'; Uryga (yellow card) 62'; Boguski (yellow card) 77'	Summary	Rakels 7'; Deleu (yellow card) 18' (goal) 23'; Čovilo (yellow card) 29'; Jendrišek (yellow card) 72'; Sretenović (yellow card) 90+2'	Stadium: Stadion Miejski, Kraków; Attendance: 20,094; Referee: (Poland) Tomasz Kwiatkowski

2 December 2015 Match 18	Cracovia	4–1	Podbeskidzie Bielsko-Biała	Kraków
20:30	Rakels 9' 75'; Jendrišek 33'; Budziński 89'	Summary	Pazio (yellow card) 24'; Mateusz Szczepaniak 40'; Deja (yellow card) 44'	Stadium: Marshal Józef Piłsudski Stadium; Attendance: 6,486; Referee: (Poland) Jarosław Przybył

5 December 2015 Match 19	Piast Gliwice	2–2	Cracovia	Gliwice
18:00	Rymaniak 45+1' (o.g.); Nešpor 52' (yellow card) 61'; Moskwik (yellow card) 89'	Summary	Rymaniak (yellow card) 23'; Rakels 32'; Jaroszyński 56'	Stadium: Stadion Piast; Attendance: 6,006; Referee: (Poland) Pawel Gil

14 December 2015 Match 20	Cracovia	2–2	Korona Kielce	Kraków
18:00	Rakels 3' 80'; Polczak (yellow card) 21'; Budziński (yellow card) 36'	Summary	Airam López 19' 58'; Sierpina (yellow card) 35'; Grzelak (yellow card) 40'; Aankour (yellow card) 73'	Stadium: Marshal Józef Piłsudski Stadium; Attendance: 7,834; Referee: (Poland) Tomasz Kwiatkowski

19 December 2015 Match 21	Jagiellonia Białystok	2–2	Cracovia	Białystok
18:00	Frankowski 64'; Mackiewicz (yellow card) 71'; Grzelczak 83'; Grzyb (yellow card) 84'	Summary	Jendrišek 11' (yellow card) 90+4'; Budziński (yellow card) 57'; Rymaniak (yellow card) 59'; Sretenović (yellow card) 68'; Čovilo (yellow card) 77'; Rakels 88'	Stadium: Białystok City Stadium; Attendance: 7,630; Referee: (Poland) Szymon Marciniak

13 February 2016 Match 22	Cracovia	3–0	Górnik Zabrze	Kraków
18:00	Kapustka 3'; Jendrišek 22'; Cetnarski 29'	Summary		Stadium: Marshal Józef Piłsudski Stadium; Attendance: 9,106; Referee: (Poland) Bartosz Frankowski

20 February 2016 Match 23	LKS Nieciecza	1–1	Cracovia	Nieciecza
18:00	Pleva (yellow card) 53'; Jarecki 56'; Mateusz Kupczak (yellow card) 90'	Summary	Wołąkiewicz (yellow card) 12'; Polczak (yellow card) 66'; Jendrišek 76'; Bejan (yellow card) 89'	Stadium: Stadion Termaliki Bruk-Bet; Attendance: 4,595; Referee: (Poland) Szymon Marciniak

26 February 2016 Match 24	Cracovia	1–2	Zagłębie Lubin	Kraków
20:30	Dialiba 54'; Kapustka (yellow card) 67'; Deleu (yellow card) 73'; Zjawiński (yellow card) 90'	Summary	Todorovski (yellow card) 15'; Starzyński 45' (pen.); Tosik (yellow card) 53'; Janoszka 63'; Jarosław Kubicki (yellow card) 83'; Woźniak (yellow card) 83'	Stadium: Marshal Józef Piłsudski Stadium; Referee: (Poland) Paweł Raczkowski

2 March 2016 Match 25	Ruch Chorzów	2–3	Cracovia	Chorzów
18:00	Mazek 24'; Stępiński 38'	Summary	Jendrišek 5'; Zejdler (yellow card) 23'; Cetnatski 59'; Dąbrowski 61'; Polczak (yellow card) 75'; Vestenický (yellow card) 90'	Stadium: Stadion Ruchu; Attendance: 6,701; Referee: (Poland) Tomasz Kwiatkowski

6 March 2016 Match 26	Lech Poznań	2–1	Cracovia	Poznań
18:00	Jevtić 9'; Lovrencasics (yellow card) 47'; Gajos 87'	Summary	Kapustka 7'	Stadium: Stadion Miejski (Poznań); Attendance: 24,813; Referee: (Poland) Daniel Stefański

12 March 2016 Match 27	Cracovia	1–2	Legia Warsaw	Kraków
18:00	Jendrišek 8'; Kapustka (yellow card) 34'; Cetnarski (yellow card) 84'; Deleu (yellow card) 88'	Summary	Guilherme 3' (yellow card) 60'; Lewczuk (yellow card) 62'; Prijović 83'; Masłowski (yellow card) 90+3'	Stadium: Marshal Józef Piłsudski Stadium; Attendance: 14,000; Referee: (Poland) Bartosz Frankowski

20 March 2016 Match 28	Pogoń Szczecin	2–2	Cracovia	Szczecin
18:00	Gyurcsó 8'; Frączczak (yellow card) 37'; Dawid Kort 56'; Zwoliński (yellow card) 61'	Summary	Vestenický 26'; Wdowiak 48'; Bejan (yellow card) 52'; Jendrišek (yellow card) 79'	Stadium: Stadion Florian Krygier; Attendance: 8,115; Referee: (Poland) Tomasz Kwiatkowski

2 April 2016 Match 29	Cracovia	0–0	Górnik Łęczna	Kraków
18:00	Bejan (yellow card) 60'	Summary	Pruchnik (yellow card) 28'; Božić (yellow card) 52'; Tymiński (yellow card) 80'	Stadium: Marshal Józef Piłsudski Stadium; Attendance: 8,091; Referee: (Poland) Jarosaw Przybył

9 April 2016 Match 30	Śląsk Wrocław	2–1	Cracovia	Wrocław
18:00	Hateley (yellow card) 28'; Dvali (yellow card) 37'; Dudu Paraíba (yellow card) 40'; Pawelec (yellow card) 64'; Mervó 70'; Hołota (yellow card) 86'; Morioka 90+3'	Summary	Cetnarski 12'; Polczak (yellow card) 81'	Stadium: Stadion Miejski; Referee: (Japan) Hiroyuki Kimura

16 April 2016 Match 31	Piast Gliwice	1–1	Cracovia	Gliwice
20:30	Mak 42'; Szeliga (yellow card) 69'; Gerard Badía (yellow card) 89'	Summary	Kapustka (yellow card) 10'; Budziński (yellow card) 33'; Čovilo (yellow card) 55' (goal) 90'	Stadium: Stadion Piast; Attendance: 5,644; Referee: (Poland) Paweł Raczkowski

19 April 2016 Match 32	Cracovia	1–0	Zagłębie Lubin	Kraków
18:00	Cetnarski 62' (pen.); Jaroszyński (yellow card) 85'; Deleu (yellow card) 90+2'	Summary	Rakowski (yellow card) 60'	Stadium: Marshal Józef Piłsudski Stadium; Attendance: 6,708; Referee: (Poland) Daniel Stefański

22 April 2016 Match 33	Legia Warsaw	4–0	Cracovia	Warsaw
20:30	Prijović 6'; Kucharczyk 25'; Nikolić 32'; Hämäläinen 77'; Jodłowiec (yellow card) 83'	Summary	Kapustka (yellow card) 29'; Deleu (yellow card) 38'	Stadium: Polish Army Stadium; Attendance: 24,061; Referee: (Poland) Jarosław Przybył

29 April 2016 Match 34	Ruch Chorzów	0–1	Cracovia	Chorzów
20:30	Cichocki (yellow card) 77'	Summary	Čovilo 4' (yellow card) 33'; Wołąkiewicz (yellow card) 47'; Wójcicki (yellow card) 68'; Polczak (yellow card) 82'	Stadium: Stadion Miejski; Attendance: 6,120; Referee: (Poland) Tomasz Kwiatkowski

8 May 2016 Match 35	Cracovia	2–0	Lech Poznań	Kraków
15:30	Jendrišek 14'; Budziński 42'; Deleu (yellow card) 69'; Bejan (yellow card) 86'	Summary	Gajos (yellow card) 54'; Kamiński (yellow card) 62'	Stadium: Marshal Józef Piłsudski Stadium; Attendance: 10,586; Referee: (Poland) Krysztof Jakubik

11 May 2016 Match 36	Pogoń Szczecin	3–2	Cracovia	Szczecin
20:30	Dawid Kort 30'; Frączczak 73' (pen.); Zwoliński 82'; Słowik (yellow card) 90+1'	Summary	Fojut 64' (o.g.); Jaroszyński (yellow card) 73' (yellow-red card); Budziński (yellow card) 73'; Cetnarski 80'; Čovilo (yellow card) 85'	Stadium: Stadion Florian Krygier; Attendance: 5,073; Referee: (Poland) Krzysztof Jakubik

15 May 2016 Match 37	Cracovia	2–0	Lechia Gdańsk	Kraków
18:00	Cetnarski 9' (yellow card) 79'; Wołąkiewicz (yellow card) 12'; Budziński (yellow card) 63'; Janicki 65' (o.g.); Kapustka (yellow card) 80'; Bejan (yellow card) 86'	Summary	Kuświk (yellow card) 26'; Wojtkowiak (yellow card) 63'; Peszko (yellow card) 72'; Stolarski (yellow card) 80'; Savić (yellow card) 84'	Stadium: Marshal Józef Piłsudski Stadium; Attendance: 12,359; Referee: (Poland) Szymon Marciniak

=== Polish Cup ===
11 August 2015 Last 32	Dolcan Ząbki	2–3	Cracovia	Ząbki
17:00 CET	Świerblewski 2'; Matuszek 26'; Piotr Petasz (yellow card) 79' (yellow-red card)	Summary	Kapustka 1'; Wołąkiewicz (yellow card) 7'; Zjawiński 47' 67' (red card) 88'; Deleu (yellow card) 78'; Cetnarski (yellow card) 90+1'; Budziński (yellow card) 90+2'	Stadium: Stadion Dolcanu; Attendance: 450; Referee: (Poland) Piotr Idzik

22 September 2015 Last 16	GKS Katowice	1–3	Cracovia	Katowice
17:45 CET	Goncerz 79' (pen.)	Summary	Čovilo 19'; Jendrišek 70'; Dialiba 84'	Stadium: Stadion GKS Katowice; Attendance: 2,600; Referee: (Poland) Marek Opaliński

==== Quarterfinals ====
27 October 2015 First leg	Zagłębie Sosnowiec	1–2	Cracovia	Sosnowiec
20:30 CET	Fidziukiewicz 43'; Łukasz Sołowiej (yellow card) 75'	Summary	Čovilo 22'; Deleu (yellow card) 82'; Rymaniak (yellow card) 87'; Dąbrowski (yellow card) 88'; Rakels 90'	Stadium: Stadion Ludowy; Referee: (Poland) Marcin Borski

19 November 2015 Second leg	Cracovia	0–2 (2–3 agg.)	Zagłębie Sosnowiec	Kraków
17:45 CET	Wołąkiewicz (yellow card) 69'; Mateusz Wdowiak (yellow card) 90+2'	Summary	Pribula 26'; Sebastian Dudek 40' (pen.); Konrad Budek (yellow card) 47'	Stadium: Marshal Józef Piłsudski Stadium; Attendance: 3,436; Referee: (Poland) Zbigniew Dobrynin
