= 2014–15 Śląsk Wrocław season =

Polish football club season

Śląsk Wrocław is a professional football club based in Wrocław, Poland. During the 2014–15 campaign the club competed in the Ekstraklasa and the Polish Cup.

== Ekstraklasa ==
20 July 2014 Match 1	Śląsk Wrocław	2 - 0	Ruch Chorzów	Wrocław
18:00	Mila 7'; Pich 79'	Summary	Kuświk (yellow card) 58'	Stadium: Stadion Miejski; Attendance: 10,180; Referee: (Poland) Marcin Borski

26 July 2014 Match 2	Pogoń Szczecin	4 - 1	Śląsk Wrocław	Szczecin
18:00	Frączczak 45+1'; Zwoliński 56'; Murayama 59'; Golla 77'	Summary	Pich 39'; Mila (yellow card) 63'; Pawłowski (red card) 73'; Grodzicki (yellow card) 86'; Droppa (yellow card) 90'	Stadium: Stadion Florian Krygier; Attendance: 7,377; Referee: (Poland) Pawe Raczkowski

3 August 2014 Match 3	Śląsk Wrocław	2 - 1	Zawisza Bydgoszcz	Wrocław
15:30	Pich 7' 28'; Grodzicki (yellow card) 90+2'	Summary	Drygas 32'; Luís Carlos Lima (yellow card) 53' (yellow-red card)	Stadium: Stadion Miejski; Attendance: 6,839; Referee: (Poland) Mariusz Zlotek

9 August 2014 Match 4	GKS Bełchatów	2 - 0	Śląsk Wrocław	Bełchatów
18:00	Mak (yellow card) 17' (goal) 44' (pen.); Rachwał (yellow card) 42'; Norambuena (yellow card) 45'; Bartosiak (yellow card) 54'; Poźniak 81'	Report	Machaj (yellow card) 72'	Stadium: Stadion GKS; Attendance: 3,500; Referee: (Poland) Tomasz Musial

17 August 2014 Match 5	Śląsk Wrocław	0 - 0	KS Cracovia	Wrocław
15:30	Danielewicz (yellow card) 34'; Hołota (yellow card) 41'; Hateley (yellow card) 65'; Droppa (yellow card) 76'	Summary	Čovilo (yellow card) 3'; Żytko (yellow card) 55'	Stadium: Stadion Miejski; Attendance: 8,150; Referee: (Poland) Szymon Marciniak

23 August 2014 Match 6	Jagiellonia Białystok	1 - 3	Śląsk Wrocław	Białystok
20:30	Piątkowski 23'; Słowik (red card) 62'	Summary	Mila 65' (pen.); Droppa 86'; Danielewicz (yellow card) 88'; Ostrowski 89'	Stadium: Białystok City Stadium; Attendance: 6,435; Referee: (Poland) Krzysztof Jakubik

30 August 2014 Match 7	Śląsk Wrocław	2 - 0	Górnik Zabrze	Wrocław
18:00	Mila (yellow card) 26'; Flávio Paixão 34' 90+2'	Summary	Gergel (yellow card) 9'; Madej (yellow card) 20'; Gancarczyk (yellow card) 50'	Stadium: Stadion Miejski; Attendance: 9,793; Referee: (Poland) Daniel Stefański

13 September 2014 Match 8	Legia Warsaw	4 - 3	Śląsk Wrocław	Warsaw
20:30	Radović 13' 85'; Dossa Júnior 21' 42'; Kucharczyk (yellow card) 63'; Żyro (yellow card) 73'	Summary	Mila 34'; Machaj 49'; Hołota (yellow card) 56'; Droppa (yellow card) 79'; Flávio Paixão 90'	Stadium: Polish Army Stadium; Attendance: 16,187; Referee: (Poland) Pawel Gil

19 September 2014 Match 9	Śląsk Wrocław	1 - 0	Korona Kielce	Wrocław
18:00	Danielewicz (yellow card) 28'; Flávio Paixão 72'; Juanito (yellow card) 90'	Summary	Pylypchuk (yellow card) 23'; Golański (yellow card) 25'; Dejmek (yellow card) 66'	Stadium: Stadion Miejski; Attendance: 7,669; Referee: (Poland) Tomasz Musial

26 September 2014 Match 10	Śląsk Wrocław	2 - 1	Górnik Łęczna	Wrocław
20:30	Ostrowski 63'; Mila 90+3'	Summary	Burkhardt (yellow card) 38'; Božok 62'; Mierzejewski (yellow card) 89'	Stadium: Stadion Miejski; Attendance: 11,171; Referee: (Poland) Marcin Borski

3 October 2014 Match 11	Podbeskidzie	2 - 2	Śląsk Wrocław	Bielsko-Biała
18:00	Górkiewicz (yellow card) 27'; Chmiel 30' (yellow card) 90+2'; Chrapek 70'; Bartosz Śpiączka (yellow card) 74' sloboda (yellow card) 76'	Summary	Celeban 21'; Paweł Zieliński (yellow card) 41'; Flávio Paixão 50'; Droppa (yellow card) 83'; Machaj (yellow card) 90+1'	Stadium: Stadion Miejski; Referee: (Poland) Jarosaw Przybyl

18 October 2014 Match 12	Śląsk Wrocław	3 - 0	Piast Gliwice	Wrocław
15:30	Dudu Paraíba (yellow card) 24'; Danielwicz (yellow card) 46'; Flávio Paixão 46' 51'; Pich 72'	Summary	Carles (yellow card) 33'; Klepczyński (yellow card) 40'	Stadium: Stadion Miejski; Attendance: 14,746; Referee: (Poland) Bartosz Frankowski

25 October 2014 Match 13	Lechia Gdańsk	1 - 4	Śląsk Wrocław	Gdańsk
15:30	Borysiuk (red card) 10'; Janicki (yellow card) 37'; Vranješ (yellow card) 59'; Friesenbichler 80' (yellow card) 87'; Wiśniewski (yellow card) 85'	Summary	Flávio Paixão 6' 11' (pen.) 23' 50'	Stadium: PGE Arena Gdańsk; Attendance: 13,966; Referee: (Poland) Bartosz Frankowski

2 November 2014 Match 14	Śląsk Wrocław	1-1	Lech Poznań	Wrocław
15:30	Pawełek (yellow card) 43'; Machaj 70'; Mila (yellow card) 78'; Dudu Paraíba (yellow card) 85'	Summary	Jevtić 2'; Trałka (yellow card) 27'; Henríquez (yellow card) 86'	Stadium: Stadion Miejski; Attendance: 22,687; Referee: (Poland) Tomasz Kwiatkowski

8 November 2014 Match 15	Wisła Kraków	1 - 1	Śląsk Wrocław	Kraków
20:30	Brożek 68'; Dudka (yellow card) 84'	Summary	Flávio Paixão 17' (pen.); Ostrowski (yellow card) 67'; Danielewicz (yellow card) 72'	Stadium: Stadion Miejski; Attendance: 14,242; Referee: (Poland) Krzysztof Jakubik

21 November 2014 Match 16	Ruch Chorzów	1 - 0	Śląsk Wrocław	Chorzów
18:00 CET	Kuświk 90'	Summary	Konrad Kaczmarek (yellow card) 29'	Stadium: Stadion Ruchu; Attendance: 5,300; Referee: (Poland) Pawe Raczkowski

30 November 2014 Match 17	Śląsk Wrocław	1 - 1	Pogoń Szczecin	Wrocław
18:00	Celeban (yellow card) 31'; Paweł Zieliński 55' (yellow card) 85'	Summary	Hernâni (yellow card) 24'; Rudol (yellow card) 32'; Murayama 33'; Golla (yellow card) 79'; Rogalski (yellow card) 88'	Stadium: Stadion Miejski; Attendance: 8,297; Referee: (Poland) Marciniak

5 December 2014 Match 18	Zawisza Bydgoszcz	0 - 1	Śląsk Wrocław	Bydgoszcz
18:00 CET	Wágner (yellow card) 17'; Ziajka (yellow card) 45'; Masłowski (yellow card) 68' (yellow-red card); Luís Carlos Lima (yellow card) 89'; Strąk (yellow card) 90+3'	Summary	Paweł Zieliński (yellow card) 35'; Danielewicz (yellow card) 45'; Hateley (yellow card) 68'; Droppa (yellow card) 69'; Mila 86'	Stadium: Zdzisław Krzyszkowiak Stadium; Attendance: 1,026; Referee: (Poland) Borski

12 December 2014 Match 19	Śląsk Wrocław	2-1	GKS Bełchatów	Wrocław
20:30 CET	Juanito (yellow card) 20'; Marco Paixão 62'; Droppa (yellow card) 65'; Flávio Paixão 80' (pen.)	Summary	Flis (yellow card) 20'; Norambuena (yellow card) 57'; Ślusarski 90+1'	Stadium: Stadion Miejski; Attendance: 7,315; Referee: (Poland) Jarosław Przybył

15 February 2014 Match 20	Cracovia	1-1	Śląsk Wrocław	Kraków
15:30 CET	Čovilo (yellow card) 19'; Jendrišek (yellow card) 71'; Budziński 88'; Sretenović (yellow card) 90'	Summary	Grajciar 51'; Droppa (yellow card) 62'; Hateley (yellow card) 78'; Pawełek (yellow card) 89'	Stadium: Marshal Józef Piłsudski Stadium; Attendance: 8,156; Referee: (Poland) Bartosz Frankowski

21 February 2014 Match 21	Śląsk Wrocław	0-1	Jagiellonia Białystok	Wrocław
18:00 CET	Droppa (yellow card) 77'; Pawelec (yellow card) 87'	Summary	Karol Mackiewicz 13' (yellow card) 20'; Tymiński (yellow card) 90'; Dzalamidze (yellow card) 90+3'	Stadium: Stadion Miejski; Attendance: 9,097; Referee: (Poland) Paweł Raczkowski

28 February 2014 Match 22	Górnik Zabrze	3-3	Śląsk Wrocław	Zabrze
18:00 CET	Gergel 5'; Madej (yellow card) 55' (goal) 74'; Grendel (yellow card) 73'; Magiera 85' (pen.)	Summary	Marco Paixão 44'; Machaj 52' (yellow card) 52'; Flávio Paixão 82'; Hołota (yellow card) 84'	Stadium: Ernest Pohl Stadium; Attendance: 3,000; Referee: (Poland) Mariusz Zlotek

8 March 2014 Match 23	Śląsk Wrocław	1-3	Legia Warsaw	Wrocław
18:00 CET	Pich (yellow card) 28'; Marco Paixão 42'	Summary	Rzeźniczak 18' (yellow card) 72'; Jodłowiec (yellow card) 22' (goal) 32'; Kucharczyk 73'; Iñaki Astiz (yellow card) 77'; Duda (yellow card) 88'	Stadium: Stadion Miejski; Attendance: 21,005; Referee: (Poland) Bartosz Frankowski

15 March 2014 Match 24	Korona Kielce	2-2	Śląsk Wrocław	Kielce
15:30 CET	Kiełb 26' 33'; Malarczyk (yellow card) 80'; Jovanović (yellow card) 85'	Summary	Marco Paixão 4' (yellow card) 77'; Hołota (yellow card) 25'; Pich 47'; Flávio Paixão (yellow card) 74'; Dudu Paraíba (yellow card) 84'	Stadium: Kielce City Stadium; Attendance: 7,918; Referee: (Poland) Tomasz Musial

20 March 2014 Match 25	Górnik Łęczna	1-1	Śląsk Wrocław	Łęczna
20:30 CET	Božić (yellow card) 8'; Bielák (yellow card) 42'; Nowak 90'	Summary	Flávio Paixão (yellow card) 42' (goal) 82'; Grajciar (yellow card) 64'	Stadium: Stadion Górnika Łęczna; Attendance: 6,302; Referee: (Poland) Krzysztof Jakubik

4 April 2014 Match 26	Śląsk Wrocław	0-0	Podbeskidzie	Wrocław
15:30 CET	Pawelec (yellow card) 40'; Flávio Paixão (yellow card) 50'; Hateley (yellow card) 77'; Lačný (yellow card) 81' (yellow-red card)	Summary	Górkiewicz (yellow card) 41'; Konieczny (yellow card) 42'; Sokołowski (yellow card) 50'	Stadium: Stadion Miejski; Attendance: 8,149; Referee: (Poland) Pawel Gil

11 April 2014 Match 27	Piast Gliwice	2-0	Śląsk Wrocław	Gliwice
18:00 CET	Wilczek (yellow card) 16'; Podgórski (yellow card) 52'; Hanzel 71' 85'	Summary	Dudu Paraíba (yellow card) 21'; Droppa (yellow card) 55'; Danielewicz (yellow card) 59' (yellow-red card)	Stadium: Stadion Piast; Attendance: 5,007; Referee: (Poland) Tomasz Musial

18 April 2014 Match 28	Śląsk Wrocław	3-0	Lechia Gdańsk	Wrocław
15:30 CET	Machaj 21' (pen.); Pawelec (yellow card) 39'; Hołota (yellow card) 45'; Celeban 54'; Marco Paixão 86'	Summary	Rudinilson Silva (yellow card) 52'; Grzelczak (yellow card) 79'	Stadium: Stadion Miejski; Attendance: 11,651; Referee: (Poland) Tomasz Kwiatkowski

25 April 2014 Match 29	Lech Poznań	2-0	Śląsk Wrocław	Poznań
20:30 CET	Hämäläinen 56'; Arajuuri 84'	Summary		Stadium: INEA Stadion; Attendance: 22,175; Referee: (Poland) Marcin Borski

29 April 2014 Match 30	Śląsk Wrocław	1-0	Wisła Kraków	Wrocław
20:30 CET	Pich 68'; Danielewicz (yellow card) 82'	Summary	Dudka (yellow card) 38'; Burliga (yellow card) 67'; Sadlok (yellow card) 81'	Stadium: Stadion Miejski; Referee: (Poland) Paweł Raczkowski

=== Championship Round ===
8 May 2015 Match 1	Jagiellonia Białystok	1-1	Śląsk Wrocław	Białystok
20:30 CET	Frankowski 46'; Tarasovs (yellow card) 87'	Summary	Pawelec (yellow card) 26'; Zieliński (yellow card) 32'; Machaj (yellow card) 49'; Pich 55'	Stadium: Białystok City Stadium; Attendance: 11,416; Referee: (Poland) Daniel Stefański

17 May 2015 Match 2	Śląsk Wrocław	1-1	Legia Warsaw	Wrocław
18:00 CET	Flávio Paixão 6'; Konrad Kaczmarek (yellow card) 51'	Summary	Jodłowiec 34'; Żyro (yellow card) 36'; Saganowski (yellow card) 45+2'; Brzyski (yellow card) 58' (yellow-red card); Furman (yellow card) 70'; Orlando Sá (yellow card) 73'; Malarz (yellow card) 90+3'	Stadium: Stadion Miejski; Attendance: 15,768; Referee: (Poland) Adam Lyczmanski

20 May 2015 Match 3	Lech Poznań	3-0	Śląsk Wrocław	Poznań
18:00 CET	Kownacki 12'; Pawłowski 17' 27'	Summary		Stadium: INEA Stadion; Attendance: 15,377; Referee: (Poland) Tomasz Musial

23 May 2015 Match 4	Śląsk Wrocław	1-1	Górnik Zabrze	Wrocław
15:30 CET	Zieliński (yellow card) 19'; Marco Paixão 49'; Machaj (yellow card) 90+1'	Summary	Iwan 89' (yellow card) 90'	Stadium: Stadion Miejski; Attendance: 5,875; Referee: (Poland) Krzysztof Jakubik

30 May 2015 Match 5	Śląsk Wrocław	1-0	Lechia Gdańsk	Wrocław
20:30 CET	Flávio Paixão 77'	Summary		Stadium: Stadion Miejski; Attendance: 6,986; Referee: (Poland) Tomasz Kwiatkowski

3 June 2015 Match 6	Wisła Kraków	0-1	Śląsk Wrocław	Kraków
20:30 CET	Barrientos (yellow card) 38'; Uryga (yellow card) 44'; Burliga (yellow card) 46'; Głowacki (yellow card) 88'	Summary	Pich 78'	Stadium: Stadion Miejski; Attendance: 11,221; Referee: (Poland) Paweł Raczkowski

7 June 2015 Match 7	Śląsk Wrocław	2-1	Pogoń Szczecin	Wrocław
18:00 CET	Flávio Paixão 13' 69' (pen.); Hołota (yellow card) 89'	Summary	Kamil Wojtkowski (yellow card) 38'; Kun (yellow card) 55'; Murawski 56'	Stadium: Stadion Miejski; Attendance: 8,135; Referee: (Poland) Paweł Raczkowski

== Polish Cup ==
23 September 2014 Last 32	Widzew Łódź	1 - 2	Śląsk Wrocław	Łódź
20:00	David Kwiek 9' (yellow card) 45'; Damian Warchoł (yellow card) 15'; Kasprzak (yellow card) 48'	Summary	Grodzicki (yellow card) 29'; Machaj 38'; Flávio Paixão 60'	Stadium: Stadion Widzewa; Attendance: 1,200; Referee: (Poland) Marcin Szczerbowicz

28 October 2014 Last 16	Stal Stalowa Wola	0-1	Śląsk Wrocław	Stalowa Wola
13:00	Marcin Kowalski (yellow card) 28' (yellow-red card); Michał Mistrzyk (yellow card) 57'; Tomasz Wietecha (yellow card) 88'	Summary	Grodzicki (yellow card) 68'; Mila (yellow card) 81'; Juanito 87'	Stadium: Stadion MOSiR; Attendance: 2,200; Referee: (Poland) Marcin Szczerbowicz

12 February 2015 QF First Leg	Śląsk Wrocław	1-1	Legia Warsaw	Wrocław
20:00 CET	Hołota (yellow card) 24' (yellow-red card); Marco Paixão 85'	Summary	Rzeźniczak (yellow card) 29'; Guilherme (yellow card) 45'; Żyro 45+3'; Vrdoljak (yellow card) 69' (yellow-red card); Kucharczyk (yellow card) 90+5'	Stadium: Stadion Miejski; Attendance: 15,183; Referee: (Poland) Adam Lyczmanski

5 March 2015 QF Second Leg	Legia Warsaw	1-1 (2-2 agg.) (3-1 p)	Śląsk Wrocław	Warsaw
20:00 CET	Żyro 53'; Furman (yellow card) 58'; Dossa Júnior (yellow card) 65'; Duda (yellow card) 102'; Saganowski (yellow card) 105'	Summary	Grajciar 12' (yellow card) 61'	Stadium: Polish Army Stadium; Attendance: 21,464; Referee: (Poland) Szymon Marciniak

== League table ==
Pos	Team	Pld	W	D	L	GF	GA	GD	Pts	Qualification or relegation
1	Legia Warsaw	30	17	5	8	57	30	+27	56	Qualification to Championship round
2	Lech Poznań	30	14	12	4	52	27	+25	54	Qualification to Championship round
3	Jagiellonia Białystok	30	14	7	9	43	35	+8	49	Qualification to Championship round
4	Śląsk Wrocław	30	12	10	8	43	36	+7	46	Qualification to Championship round
5	Wisła Kraków	30	11	10	9	47	39	+8	43 (Note: Wisła Kraków ahead on head-to-head record; Górnik Zabrze–Wisła Kraków 0–5, Wisła Kraków–Górnik Zabrze 1–1)	Qualification to Championship round
6	Górnik Zabrze	30	11	10	9	43	43	0	43	Qualification to Championship round
7	Pogoń Szczecin	30	11	8	11	40	38	+2	41 (Note: Tied on head-to-head record, Pogoń Szczecin ahead on goal difference; Lechia Gdańsk–Pogoń Szczecin 0–1, Pogoń Szczecin–Lechia Gdańsk 0–1)	Qualification to Championship round
8	Lechia Gdańsk	30	11	8	11	36	37	−1	41	Qualification to Championship round
9	Korona Kielce	30	10	9	11	34	42	−8	39 (Note: Head-to-head record; Korona Kielce 10pts, Piast Gliwice 6pts, Podbeskidzie Bielsko-Biała 1pts)	Qualification to the Relegation round
10	Piast Gliwice	30	11	6	13	38	43	−5	39	Qualification to the Relegation round
11	Podbeskidzie Bielsko-Biała	30	10	9	11	40	48	−8	39	Qualification to the Relegation round
12	Cracovia	30	10	7	13	35	41	−6	37	Qualification to the Relegation round
13	Górnik Łęczna	30	8	10	12	31	37	−6	34	Qualification to the Relegation round
14	Ruch Chorzów	30	8	9	13	33	38	−5	33	Qualification to the Relegation round
15	GKS Bełchatów	30	8	7	15	24	42	−18	31	Qualification to the Relegation round
16	Zawisza Bydgoszcz	30	8	5	17	32	52	−20	29	Qualification to the Relegation round

Updated to match(es) played on 29 April 2015. Source: Ekstraklasa
Rules for classification: 1) points; 2) head-to-head points; 3) head-to-head goal difference; 4) head-to-head goals scored; 5) goal difference; 6) number of goals scored; 7) Fair play table; head-to-head record is used only after all the matches between the teams in question have been played.
