= Unia Racibórz =

Unia Racibórz can refer to:

- RTP Unia Racibórz, women's football team
- KP Unia Racibórz, men's football team
