= Dawid Plizga =

Polish footballer (born 1985)

Personal information
- Full name: Dawid Plizga
- Date of birth: 17 November 1985 (age 40)
- Place of birth: Ruda Śląska, Poland
- Height: 1.74 m (5 ft 9 in)
- Position: Midfielder

Team information
- Current team: Podbeskidzie (assistant)

Youth career
- Stadion Śląski Chorzów

Senior career*
Years	Team	Apps	(Gls)
2004–2005	GKS Katowice	32	(5)
2005–2011	Zagłębie Lubin	101	(14)
2011–2014	Jagiellonia Białystok	68	(15)
2014–2017	Górnik Zabrze	27	(2)
2015–2016	→ Termalica (loan)	48	(9)
2017–2018	GKS Katowice	12	(2)
2018–2019	Goczałkowice-Zdrój	25	(2)
2019–2020	ROW Rybnik	18	(4)
2020–2023	Unia Racibórz	86	(21)

International career
2010–2014	Poland	3	(1)

Managerial career
- 2020–2023: Unia Racibórz (player-manager)
- * Club domestic league appearances and goals

Dawid Plizga (born 17 November 1985) is a Polish professional football manager and former player who is currently the assistant manager of I liga club Podbeskidzie Bielsko-Biała.

== Club career ==
Previously, he played for GKS Katowice. He lost almost all of 2006 recovering from a serious injury.

In June 2011, he joined Jagiellonia Białystok on a three-year contract.

On 9 July 2019, Plizga joined III liga club ROW 1964 Rybnik.

== International career ==
On 10 December 2010, Plizga made his debut for the Poland national team in a friendly against Bosnia and Herzegovina.

On 6 February 2011, he scored his first senior international goal in a 1–0 friendly win over Moldova.

== Career statistics ==
=== International ===
Appearances and goals by national team and year
National team	Year	Apps	Goals
Poland	2010	1	0
Poland	2011	1	1
Poland	2014	1	0
Total		3	1

Poland score listed first, score column indicates score after each Plizga goal.

International goals by date, venue, cap, opponent, score, result and competition
No.	Date	Venue	Cap	Opponent	Score	Result	Competition
1	6 February 2011	Vila Real, Algarve, Portugal	2	Moldova	1–0	1–0	Friendly

== Managerial statistics ==
As of match played 11 November 2023

Managerial record by team and tenure
Team	From	To	Record							
Team	From	To	G	W	D	L	GF	GA	GD	Win %
Unia Racibórz (player-manager)	26 July 2020	13 December 2023	119	58	20	41	326	245	+81	48.74
Total			119	58	20	41	326	245	+81	48.74

== Honours ==
ROW Rybnik

- Polish Cup (Rybnik regionals): 2019–20

Unia Racibórz

- Regional league Silesia III: 2021–22
