= Zjawiński =

Zjawiński (Polish pronunciation: [zjaˈviɲ.ski]; feminine: Zjawińska, plural: Zjawińscy) is a Polish-language surname. Notable people with the surname include:

- Dariusz Zjawiński (born 1986), Polish footballer
- Łukasz Zjawiński (born 2001), Polish footballer
