= Sebastian Mila =

Polish footballer (born 1982)

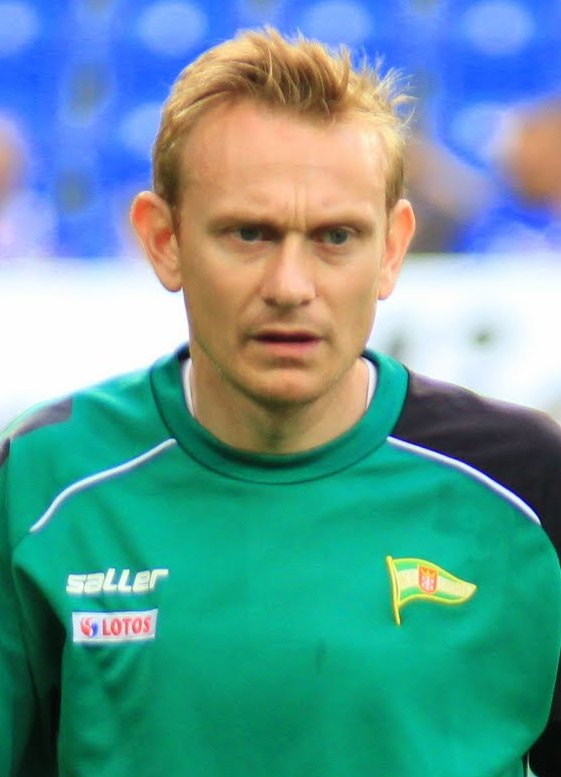
- Mila in 2015 with Lechia Gdańsk

Personal information
- Full name: Sebastian Mila
- Date of birth: 10 July 1982 (age 44)
- Place of birth: Koszalin, Poland
- Height: 1.78 m (5 ft 10 in)
- Position: Attacking midfielder

Youth career
- Gwardia Koszalin
- Bałtyk Koszalin
- 1998–1999: Lechia Gdańsk

Senior career*
Years	Team	Apps	(Gls)
1999–2001	Lechia-Polonia Gdańsk	34	(4)
2001–2002	Wisła Płock	15	(2)
2002–2005	Dyskobolia Grodzisk Wlkp.	74	(14)
2005–2007	Austria Wien	36	(3)
2007–2008	Vålerenga	14	(0)
2008	→ ŁKS Łódź (loan)	12	(0)
2008–2015	Śląsk Wrocław	178	(33)
2015–2018	Lechia Gdańsk	54	(4)
Total		417	(60)

International career
- Poland U16
- Poland U18
2003–2015	Poland	38	(8)

Managerial career
- 2023–2025: Poland (assistant)
Medal record
Men's football
Representing Poland
UEFA European Under-18 Championship
Winner	2001 Finland
UEFA European Under-16 Championship
Runner-up	1999 Czech Republic
- * Club domestic league appearances and goals

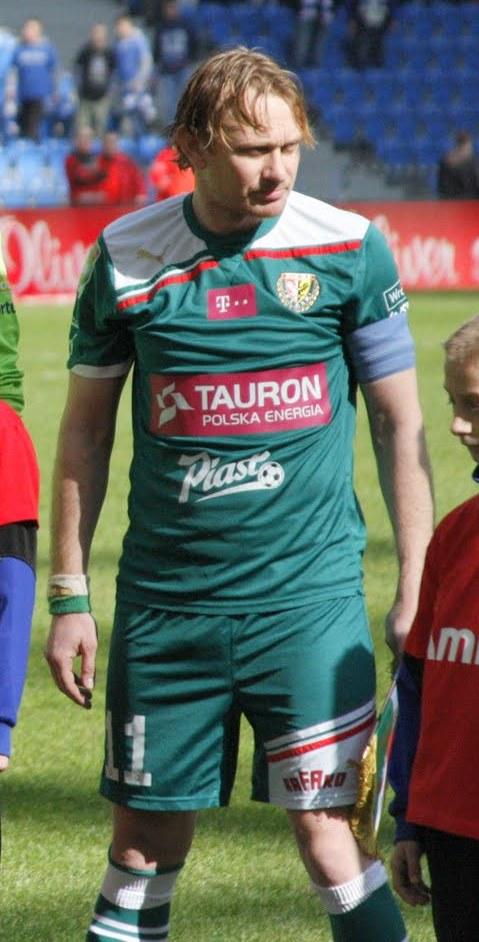
Sebastian Mila pre-match with Śląsk Wrocław, wearing his Lechia Gdańsk sweat band (2012)

Sebastian Mila (born 10 July 1982) is a Polish former professional footballer who played as an attacking midfielder. He was most recently the assistant coach of the Poland national team.

His longest spell at a club was with Śląsk Wrocław, with whom he won the Ekstraklasa and Polish Super Cup. He played for two teams outside of Poland; Austria Wien in Austria, where he won the Austrian Bundesliga and the Austrian Cup, and had a short spell with Vålerenga in Norway. Mila was an international for the Poland national team, earning a total of 38 caps and scoring 8 goals, and was included in the nation's squad for the 2006 FIFA World Cup.

== Club career ==
=== Early years ===
Born in Koszalin, Mila grew up playing for local teams Gwardia Koszalin and Bałtyk Koszalin before he moved to Gdańsk at the age of 16 and started training with the Lechia Gdańsk youth teams. Lechia Gdańsk at this time were known as Lechia-Polonia Gdańsk due to the merger between Lechia Gdańsk and Polonia Gdańsk.

=== Lechia Gdańsk ===
Mila progressed into the Lechia Gdańsk first team during the 1999–2000 season, making his professional debut against Świt Nowy Dwór Mazowiecki in March 2000. During his first season playing for Lechia he played in 12 games and scoring two goals in the II liga. The following season Mila played 22 times and scoring two goals, being unable to prevent Lechia-Polonia Gdańsk from being relegated into the third division, a relegation which would result in the break up of the merger and the recreation of Lechia Gdańsk and Polonia Gdańsk in the lower divisions. The relegation saw an exodus of players leaving the club, Mila included.

=== Orlen Płock ===
Mila moved to II liga team Orlen Płock during the summer of 2001. During the first half of the season, Mila performed well, playing 15 of the 19 league games. His performances caught the eye of top division team Dyskobolia Grodzisk Wielkopolski, with Mila making the transfer during the winter transfer window. Orlen finished the season as runners-up, and were promoted to the top division.

=== Dyskobolia Grodzisk Wielkopolski ===
His move to Dyskobolia saw early success in Mila's career. In his first full season, Dyskobolia finished runners-up in the Ekstraklasa, resulting in European football for the following season. Mila played in every game of the team's European adventure in the UEFA Cup, beating FK Atlantas and Hertha Berlin before a second round tie with Manchester City. After the 0–0 draw at home, it was the away leg which brought Mila to the attention of European and Polish football fans. He converted a free-kick against David Seaman resulting in Dyskobolia progressing due to away goals. Dyskobolia faced Bordeaux in the next round, and were knocked out losing 5–1 on aggregate. The club ended up finishing the league campaign in 4th. The following season started well for Dyskobolia, who would finish as runners-up in the Ekstraklasa once more, as well as winning the Polish Cup. Mila played 13 games in the league during the autumn round as well as one game in the successful cup run.

=== Austria Vienna ===
During the winter break of the 2004–05 season, Mila moved to Austria Vienna. In his first season with Austria he played 13 times in half a season, during which Austria finished in third place and won the Austrian Cup. The following season, his first full season at the club, he didn't manage to play any more games than the previous season. Despite not being able to claim a consistent starting position, Mila helped Austria win the 2005–06 Austrian Bundesliga as well as his second Austrian Cup. The 2006–07 season was a turning point for Vienna as a club, with the team not having the same funds as before and many players leaving at the start of the season and during the winter transfer window. After playing 10 games at the start of the season, Mila was one of those players to leave in January. Austria struggled for the rest of the season, finishing in a disappointing 6th.

=== Vålerenga & ŁKS Łódź ===
In January 2007 Mila joined Vålerenga for the 2007 Tippeligaen season. Mila made 14 appearances for Vålerenga over the course of the season, with the team finishing in 7th. In February 2008 Mila moved back to Poland, on loan to ŁKS Łódź for the remainder of the 2007–08 season. Mila played 12 of the remaining 15 fixtures of the season in the Ekstraklasa as he helped the team stay above the relegation zone.

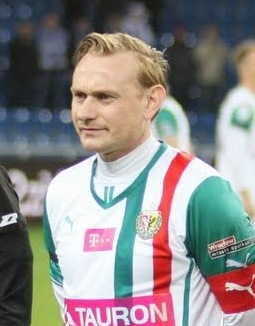
Mila as a captain of Śląsk Wrocław in 2014

=== Śląsk Wrocław ===
Mila joined newly promoted Ekstraklasa team Śląsk Wrocław. He instantly became a key player for Śląsk, and helped the team to win the Ekstraklasa Cup in the 2008–09 season, as well as an impressive 6th place in the league. Śląsk Wrocław finished the following season in 9th, with Mila becoming captain for the start of the following season. As captain he led the team finish runners-up in the 2010–11 season. The 2011–12 season was to be a historic one for Śląsk. After qualifying for the UEFA Europa League, Śląsk managed to reach the qualification playoff before losing the game to Rapid București. In the league Mila played 27 of the 30 games as Śląsk Wrocław won the league, finishing 1 point ahead of second place Ruch Chorzów. The 2012–13 season was Mila's most successful in terms of individual statistics. While leading the team to a Polish Super Cup win, beating Legia Warsaw, and to a third-place finish in the Ekstraklasa, Mila played 40 games and scored 10 goals in all competitions. The following season saw Śląsk struggle, finishing in the relegation group in the league, and finishing in 9th once the season had finished. At the beginning of the 2014–15 season Mila played every single game before the winter break. After the team's fortunes and financial status declining, the decision was made to sell Mila during the winter transfer window. Over his 6 1/2 seasons at Śląsk Wrocław he won three competitions and made 216 and scored 39 goals in all competitions during this time.

=== Return to Lechia Gdańsk ===
During much of his time at Śląsk Wrocław, Mila often wore a Lechia Gdańsk sweat band on his right wrist during games. He often expressed his love for the team he started supporting after his early years at the club, and stated that he wanted to play for the club again. This opportunity was given to Mila in January 2015 when he made his return to Lechia after 13 years. Mila instantly became the Lechia captain, and played 16 games in his first half season back with the team. In his first full season he made 29 appearances with 2 goals, with what became his last professional goal coming against Ruch Chorzów. The following season, 2016–17, he made 8 appearances, and in 2017–18, one appearance. His final professional appearance came for Lechia Gdańsk against Górnik Zabrze on 5 August 2017, in which he came on as a substitute playing for the final 2 minutes.

== International career ==
A European U18 Championship winner with Poland in 2001, Mila has 38 caps for the full Poland national football team. He was selected to the 23-men national team for the 2006 FIFA World Cup finals in Germany, but did not make an appearance in any of the games. He also participated at the 1999 FIFA U-17 World Championship in New Zealand. On 11 October 2014, he scored his first international goal for over six years, finishing off a 2–0 European qualifying win which was Poland's first ever victory against Germany, as well as the first win over reigning World Champions in 29 years.

== Post-playing career ==
Following retirement, Mila started working as a football pundit for TVP Sport and Meczyki. In February 2023, he obtained the UEFA A coaching license.

On 20 September 2023, Mila was announced as one of three assistants joining the coaching staff of the Poland national team, following Michał Probierz's appointment as the head coach. He left his position after Probierz's dismissal in June 2025.

== Career statistics ==
=== Club ===
Appearances and goals by club, season and competition
Club	Season	League			National cup (Note: Includes Polish Cup, Austrian Cup, Norwegian Cup)		Europe		Other		Total	
Club	Season	Division	Apps	Goals	Apps	Goals	Apps	Goals	Apps	Goals	Apps	Goals
Lechia-Polonia Gdańsk	1999–2000	II liga	12	2	—		—		—		12	2
Lechia-Polonia Gdańsk	2000–01	II liga	22	2	1	0	—		4	0	27	2
Lechia-Polonia Gdańsk	Total		34	4	1	0	—		4	0	39	4
Orlen Płock	1999–2000	II liga	15	2	1	0	—		—		16	2
Dyskobolia Grodzisk Wielkopolski	2001–02	Ekstraklasa	9	0	0	0	—		—		9	0
Dyskobolia Grodzisk Wielkopolski	2002–03	Ekstraklasa	27	3	1	0	—		—		28	3
Dyskobolia Grodzisk Wielkopolski	2003–04	Ekstraklasa	25	8	1	0	8 (Note: Appearances in UEFA Cup)	1	—		34	9
Dyskobolia Grodzisk Wielkopolski	2004–05	Ekstraklasa	13	3	1	0	—		—		14	3
Dyskobolia Grodzisk Wielkopolski	Total		74	14	3	0	8	1	—		85	15
Austria Wien	2004–05	Austrian Bundesliga	13	0	3	1	3	1	—		19	2
Austria Wien	2005–06	Austrian Bundesliga	13	2	1	0	4	0	—		18	2
Austria Wien	2006–07	Austrian Bundesliga	10	1	0	0	4 (Note: Two appearances in UEFA Champions League, two appearances in UEFA Cup)	0	—		14	1
Austria Wien	Total		36	3	4	1	11	1	—		51	5
Vålerenga	2007	Tippeligaen	14	0	2	0	4	0	—		20	0
ŁKS Łódź (loan)	2007–08	Ekstraklasa	12	0	0	0	—		—		12	0
Śląsk Wrocław	2008–09	Ekstraklasa	22	5	0	0	—		5 (Note: Appearances in Ekstraklasa Cup)	0	27	5
Śląsk Wrocław	2009–10	Ekstraklasa	26	6	1	0	—		—		27	6
Śląsk Wrocław	2010–11	Ekstraklasa	28	4	2	0	—		—		30	4
Śląsk Wrocław	2011–12	Ekstraklasa	27	4	2	2	5 (Note: Appearances in UEFA Europa League)	1	—		34	7
Śląsk Wrocław	2012–13	Ekstraklasa	26	7	7	2	6 (Note: Four appearances and one goal in UEFA Champions League, two appearances in UEFA Europa League)	1	1 (Note: Appearance in Polish Super Cup)	0	40	10
Śląsk Wrocław	2013–14	Ekstraklasa	30	2	1	0	6	0	—		37	2
Śląsk Wrocław	2014–15	Ekstraklasa	19	5	2	0	—		—		21	5
Śląsk Wrocław	Total		178	33	15	4	17	2	6	0	216	39
Lechia Gdańsk	2014–15	Ekstraklasa	16	2	0	0	—		—		16	2
Lechia Gdańsk	2015–16	Ekstraklasa	29	2	1	0	—		—		30	2
Lechia Gdańsk	2016–17	Ekstraklasa	8	0	0	0	—		—		8	0
Lechia Gdańsk	2017–18	Ekstraklasa	1	0	0	0	—		—		1	0
Lechia Gdańsk	Total		54	4	1	0	—		—		55	4
Career total			417	60	27	5	40	4	10	0	494	69

=== International ===
Appearances and goals by national team and year
National team	Year	Apps	Goals
Poland	2003	4	2
Poland	2004	11	1
Poland	2005	8	2
Poland	2006	5	1
Poland	2011	1	0
Poland	2012	1	0
Poland	2014	4	2
Poland	2015	4	0
Total		38	8

Scores and results list Poland's goal tally first, score column indicates score after each Mila goal.

List of international goals scored by Sebastian Mila
No.	Date	Venue	Opponent	Score	Result	Competition
1	11 December 2003	National Stadium, Attard, Malta	Malta	3–0	4–0	Friendly
2	14 December 2003	Ta' Qali National Stadium, Attard, Malta	Lithuania	2–1	3–1	Friendly
3	18 February 2004	Estadio Bahía Sur, San Fernando, Spain	Slovenia	1–0	2–0	Friendly
4	13 November 2005	Mini Estadi, Barcelona, Spain	Ecuador	2–0	3–0	Friendly
5	16 November 2005	KSZO Stadium, Ostrowiec Świętokrzyski, Poland	Estonia	1–1	3–1	Friendly
6	14 May 2006	Amica Stadium, Wronki, Poland	Faroe Islands	1–0	4–0	Friendly
7	11 October 2014	National Stadium, Warsaw, Poland	Germany	2–0	2–0	UEFA Euro 2016 qualifying
8	14 November 2014	Dinamo Arena, Tbilisi, Georgia	Georgia	3–0	4–0	UEFA Euro 2016 qualifying

== Honours ==
Austria Wien

- Austrian Football Bundesliga: 2005–06
- Austrian Cup: 2004–05, 2005–06

Śląsk Wrocław

- Ekstraklasa: 2011–12
- Polish Super Cup: 2012
- Ekstraklasa Cup: 2008–09

Poland U16

- UEFA European Under-16 Championship third place: 1999

Poland U18

- UEFA European Under-18 Championship: 2001

Individual

- Ekstraklasa Player of the Year: 2011, 2012
- Ekstraklasa Midfielder of the Season: 2012–13
