= 2017–18 I liga =

I liga
- Season: 2017–18
- Dates: 29 July 2017 – 3 June 2018
- Promoted: Miedź; Zagłębie
- Relegated: Pogoń Siedlce; Górnik; Olimpia; Ruch
- Matches: 306
- Goals: 736 (2.41 per match)
- Top goalscorer: Mateusz Machaj (16 goals)
- Biggest home win: Wigry 6–0 Ruch (3 June 2018)
- Biggest away win: Ruch 0–6 Pogoń (20 April 2018)
- Highest scoring: Chrobry 3–5 Stal (13 May 2018)
- Longest winning run: 6 matches Zagłębie
- Longest unbeaten run: 11 matches Podbeskidzie
- Longest winless run: 16 matches Górnik
- Longest losing run: 7 matches Olimpia
- Highest attendance: 11,621; Podbeskidzie 1–2 Katowice (14 October 2017)
- Lowest attendance: 0 Ruch 0–1 Chrobry (4 August 2017); Ruch 3–1 Stomil (18 August 2017)
- Total attendance: 696,773
- Average attendance: 2,277 ▼11,8%

The 2017–18 I liga (currently named Nice I liga due to sponsorship reasons) was the 10th season of the Polish I liga under its current title, and the 70th season of the second highest division in the Polish football league system since its establishment in 1949. The league is operated by the Polish Football Association (PZPN). The league is contested by 18 teams. The regular season will be played in a round-robin tournament.

== Changes from last season ==
The following teams have changed division since the 2016–17 season.

=== To I liga ===
Relegated from Ekstraklasa

- Górnik Łęczna
- Ruch Chorzów

Promoted from II liga

- Raków Częstochowa
- Odra Opole
- Puszcza Niepołomice

=== From I liga ===
Promoted to Ekstraklasa

- Sandecja Nowy Sącz
- Górnik Zabrze

Relegated to II liga

- Wisła Puławy
- Znicz Pruszków
- MKS Kluczbork

== Team overview ==
Location of teams and stadiums in 2017–18 I liga.
Location of teams in the Metropolis GZM in 2017–18 I liga.

=== Stadiums and locations ===
Team	Location	Stadium	Capacity
Bytovia Bytów	Bytów	Stadion MOSiR	1,500
Chojniczanka Chojnice	Chojnice	Stadion Miejski Chojniczanka 1930	3,000
Chrobry Głogów	Głogów	Stadion GOS	2,817
GKS Katowice	Katowice	Stadion GKS Katowice	6,710
GKS Tychy	Tychy	Stadion Tychy	15,300
Górnik Łęczna	Łęczna	Stadion Górnika	7,200
Miedź Legnica	Legnica	Stadion Orła Białego	6,244
Odra Opole	Opole	Stadion Odry	4,250
Olimpia Grudziądz	Grudziądz	Stadion im. Bronisława Malinowskiego	5,000
Podbeskidzie Bielsko-Biała	Bielsko-Biała	Stadion BBOSiR	15,316
Pogoń Siedlce	Siedlce	Stadion ROSRRiT	2,901
Puszcza Niepołomice	Niepołomice	Stadion Puszczy	1,000
Raków Częstochowa	Częstochowa	Miejski Stadion Piłkarski Raków	8,000
Ruch Chorzów	Chorzów	Stadion Ruchu Chorzów	9,300
Stal Mielec	Mielec	Stadion MOSiR	6,800
Stomil Olsztyn	Olsztyn	Stadion OSiR	3,500^{1}
Wigry Suwałki	Suwałki	Stadion OSiR	3,060
Zagłębie Sosnowiec	Sosnowiec	Stadion Ludowy	7,500

1. Stomil Olsztyn intended to play their home games in Ostróda because their home ground (OSiR Stadium) did not fulfill license requirements. On 4 August the club announced that they had received permission to play home games in Olsztyn.

== League table ==
Pos	Team	Pld	W	D	L	GF	GA	GD	Pts	Promotion or Relegation
1	Miedź Legnica (C, P)	34	17	12	5	53	27	+26	63	Promotion to Ekstraklasa
2	Zagłębie Sosnowiec (P)	34	17	7	10	46	32	+14	58	Promotion to Ekstraklasa
3	Chojniczanka Chojnice	34	16	8	10	48	33	+15	56	
4	GKS Tychy	34	16	7	11	41	40	+1	55	
5	GKS Katowice	34	16	6	12	44	34	+10	54	
6	Wigry Suwałki	34	15	7	12	40	37	+3	52	
7	Raków Częstochowa	34	14	9	11	50	40	+10	51 (Note: Head-to-head record: Raków 1–2 Stal, Stal 2–3 Raków.)	
8	Stal Mielec	34	14	9	11	51	46	+5	51	
9	Podbeskidzie Bielsko-Biała	34	11	13	10	37	37	0	46 (Note: Head-to-head record: Chrobry 1–1 Podbeskidzie, Podbeskidzie 1–0 Chrobry.)	
10	Chrobry Głogów	34	12	10	12	46	47	−1	46	
11	Odra Opole	34	12	9	13	37	43	−6	45	
12	Puszcza Niepołomice	34	11	11	12	38	38	0	44	
13	Bytovia Bytów	34	10	10	14	36	45	−9	40	
14	Stomil Olsztyn (Note: Stomil was punished with a deduction of one point for infringement of the licensing regulations.)	34	12	4	18	39	50	−11	39	
15	Pogoń Siedlce (R)	34	9	11	14	42	50	−8	38	Qualification to play-off
16	Górnik Łęczna (R)	34	8	11	15	29	42	−13	35	Relegation to II liga
17	Olimpia Grudziądz (R)	34	7	10	17	24	37	−13	31	Relegation to II liga
18	Ruch Chorzów (Note: Ruch Chorzów was punished with a deduction of six points for infringement of the licensing regulations (five points before start of the league and six points during the season. The second punishment was reduced to one point).) (R)	34	9	6	19	35	58	−23	27	Relegation to II liga

Source: 1 liga, 90minut
Rules for classification: 1. points won; 2. points in head-to-head matches; 3. goal difference in hth matches; 4. goals scored in hth matches; 5. away goals in hth matches (only if two teams are tied); 6. total goal difference; 7. total goals scored; 8. fairplay ranking.
(C) Champions; (P) Promoted; (R) Relegated

== Positions by round ==
Team / Round	1	2	3	4	5	6	7	8	9	10	11	12	13	14	15	16	17	18	19	20	21	22	23	24	25	26	27	28	29	30	31	32	33	34
Miedź	10	12	9	6	2	2	1	1	2	3	4	3	2	2	1	1	2	3	4	3	1	1	1	1	1	1	1	1	1	1	1	1	1	1
Zagłębie	14	15	13	14	13	13	11	11	15	16	17	16	17	11	12	8	10	7	9	7	9	9	9	9	8	7	7	7	5	4	2	2	2	2
Chojniczanka	16	8	5	2	7	3	5	4	1	2	1	2	1	1	2	2	1	2	1	1	2	5	5	5	3	6	4	3	4	3	5	3	3	3
Tychy	4	4	7	5	4	5	6	10	7	9	13	14	15	16	9	14	12	14	14	14	14	13	13	13	13	12	10	9	8	8	8	8	4	4
Katowice	12	13	15	10	11	11	12	13	17	17	15	13	7	12	14	11	8	10	8	10	8	7	4	3	2	4	2	2	3	2	4	5	6	5
Wigry	12	16	16	16	17	17	17	17	16	15	16	15	16	17	11	7	9	9	7	5	4	6	3	2	4	5	3	4	6	6	7	7	8	6
Raków	10	5	10	12	14	14	15	16	10	10	7	7	9	8	7	4	4	4	3	2	5	4	6	8	7	8	8	8	9	7	6	6	7	7
Stal	6	10	8	4	6	7	8	5	5	5	5	5	5	6	6	10	7	5	5	6	6	2	2	4	5	2	5	5	2	5	3	4	5	8
Podbeskidzie	8	14	17	17	16	16	14	15	11	8	6	6	6	7	8	13	14	12	12	11	11	10	10	10	10	10	11	10	10	10	11	12	10	9
Chrobry	8	6	2	1	1	1	3	3	4	4	2	4	4	4	5	5	5	6	6	8	7	8	8	6	6	3	6	6	7	9	9	9	9	10
Odra	1	1	3	7	3	4	2	2	3	1	3	1	3	3	3	3	3	1	2	4	3	3	7	7	9	9	9	11	11	11	10	10	12	11
Puszcza	3	7	4	8	9	8	7	8	13	11	12	9	8	5	4	6	6	8	10	9	10	11	11	11	11	11	12	12	12	12	12	11	11	12
Bytovia	2	2	1	3	8	9	4	7	6	6	9	10	11	13	10	12	13	11	11	12	12	12	12	12	12	13	13	13	13	13	13	13	13	13
Stomil	15	17	14	15	12	12	10	12	8	13	14	17	13	15	17	15	15	15	16	16	15	17	17	17	17	18	16	17	17	16	16	15	15	14
Pogoń	4	9	12	11	10	10	13	9	14	14	11	11	12	9	13	9	11	13	13	13	13	14	14	14	14	14	14	14	14	14	14	14	14	15
Górnik	17	11	11	13	15	15	16	14	12	7	10	12	14	14	16	17	17	17	17	17	17	16	16	16	16	16	17	15	15	15	15	16	16	16
Olimpia	6	3	6	9	5	6	9	6	9	12	8	8	10	10	15	16	16	16	15	15	16	15	15	15	15	15	15	16	16	17	17	17	17	17
Ruch	18	18	18	18	18	18	18	18	18	18	18	18	18	18	18	18	18	18	18	18	18	18	18	18	18	17	18	18	18	18	18	18	18	18

== Results ==
Home \ Away	BYT	CCH	GŁO	KAT	TYC	GKL	MLE	OOP	GRU	PBB	PSI	PNI	RAK	RUC	STA	STO	WIG	ZSO
Bytovia Bytów	—	0–3	3–3	1–2	1–0	2–1	0–2	1–0	0–1	1–1	4–1	1–0	1–0	2–1	0–0	3–1	1–2	2–2
Chojniczanka Chojnice	4–0	—	3–0	0–2	3–0	0–0	0–0	2–1	0–0	4–0	0–2	1–1	0–1	4–3	1–0	3–0	3–0	0–2
Chrobry Głogów	0–0	0–0	—	0–2	1–0	2–0	1–2	2–0	3–2	1–1	3–1	3–1	2–3	1–0	3–5	0–1	3–3	1–2
GKS Katowice	0–0	1–0	2–2	—	1–2	1–0	1–0	1–1	2–0	3–0	1–2	1–2	2–1	1–2	0–2	3–1	0–1	1–0
GKS Tychy	1–0	2–2	2–1	1–0	—	2–0	1–0	3–0	2–1	3–3	2–3	1–1	0–3	2–0	1–0	1–0	0–3	1–1
Górnik Łęczna	1–1	3–0	2–1	1–3	1–0	—	1–1	0–3	2–0	1–0	1–1	0–1	2–1	0–0	3–4	1–1	0–1	2–1
Miedź Legnica	2–1	5–1	1–1	1–1	2–1	0–0	—	3–1	2–1	0–2	2–0	2–2	1–1	6–1	0–0	1–0	2–0	4–1
Odra Opole	1–0	2–1	1–1	1–2	1–0	3–0	2–4	—	1–0	2–2	1–1	0–0	1–0	0–3	1–0	2–4	0–0	1–0
Olimpia Grudziądz	2–1	0–1	0–1	1–1	0–1	1–0	0–1	0–2	—	0–0	4–2	0–0	1–2	1–0	2–2	1–1	2–0	0–1
Podbeskidzie Bielsko-Biała	0–2	0–0	1–0	1–2	1–1	0–0	0–0	1–2	3–0	—	2–0	2–1	1–1	1–0	2–3	1–0	1–0	0–0
Pogoń Siedlce	1–1	3–2	1–1	1–1	0–1	1–1	2–3	1–2	1–1	0–0	—	0–0	0–3	1–3	1–2	1–0	0–0	0–1
Puszcza Niepołomice	2–0	2–0	0–1	1–0	1–2	2–0	1–1	1–1	2–1	1–3	2–3	—	2–3	2–1	0–0	3–1	2–1	1–1
Raków Częstochowa	3–1	0–1	1–3	1–3	2–2	3–1	0–0	0–0	0–0	1–1	1–1	3–1	—	2–1	1–2	2–1	0–1	2–2
Ruch Chorzów	2–0	1–1	0–1	1–0	2–2	1–2	1–0	3–1	0–0	0–2	0–6	0–2	1–0	—	1–2	3–1	2–2	0–1
Stal Mielec	2–2	1–2	3–0	3–2	3–0	1–0	1–1	2–2	1–0	0–4	2–3	1–1	2–3	1–0	—	1–3	3–0	1–1
Stomil Olsztyn	0–1	0–1	1–2	1–0	2–0	2–1	2–0	2–0	1–1	3–1	0–2	2–0	1–3	2–2	1–0	—	1–2	0–2
Wigry Suwałki	2–2	0–2	1–1	0–2	1–2	0–0	0–2	2–1	1–0	3–0	2–0	1–0	0–3	6–0	2–0	1–2	—	1–0
Zagłębie Sosnowiec	2–1	1–3	2–1	3–0	0–2	2–2	0–2	1–0	0–1	2–0	1–0	1–0	2–0	3–0^{1}	3–1	5–1	0–1	—

Source: 90minut
Legend: Blue = home team win; Yellow = draw; Red = away team win.
For upcoming matches, an "a" indicates there is an article about the rivalry between the two participants.

^{1} Match declared forfeited due to Ruch Chorzów fielding an ineligible player. The game ended in a 2–1 win for Zagłębie Sosnowiec.

== I liga play-off ==
The 15th place team from the regular season will compete in a play-off with the 4th place team from II liga. Matches will be played on 9 and 13 June 2018. The winner will compete in the 2018–19 I liga season.

9 June 2018
17:00

Garbarnia Kraków	1–1	Pogoń Siedlce
Kiebzak 20'	Report	Paluchowski 78'

Stadion Garbarni, Kraków
Attendance: 1,500
Referee: Mariusz Złotek (Stalowa Wola)

13 June 2018
17:00

Pogoń Siedlce	1–2	Garbarnia Kraków
Świerblewski 87'	Report	Wójcik 45'; Kalemba 80'

Stadion ROSRRiT, Siedlce
Attendance: 1,957
Referee: Jarosław Przybył (Kluczbork)

Garbarnia won 3–2 on aggregate and will play in I liga next season.

== Top goalscorers ==
Rank	Player	Club	Goals
1	(Poland) Mateusz Machaj	Chrobry Głogów	16
2	(Poland) Szymon Lewicki	Zagłębie Sosnowiec	14
3	(Poland) Patryk Klimala	Odra Opole	13
4	(Poland) Adrian Paluchowski	Pogoń Siedlce	11
4	(Poland) Artur Siemaszko	Stomil Olsztyn	11
4	(Poland) Paweł Tomczyk	Podbeskidzie Bielsko-Biała	11
7	(Poland) Wojciech Kędziora	Wigry Suwałki	10
7	(Poland) Janusz Surdykowski	Bytovia Bytów	10
7	(Poland) Patryk Szysz	Górnik Łęczna	10
10	(Poland) Maciej Domański	Puszcza Niepołomice	9
10	(Poland) Fabian Piasecki	Miedź Legnica	9
10	(Latvia) Valērijs Šabala	Podbeskidzie Bielsko-Biała	9
10	(Poland) Szymon Skrzypczak	Odra Opole	9
10	(Poland) Marcin Wodecki	Odra Opole	9

== See also ==
- 2017–18 Ekstraklasa
- 2017–18 Polish Cup
