= Bartosz Kapustka =

Polish footballer (born 1996)

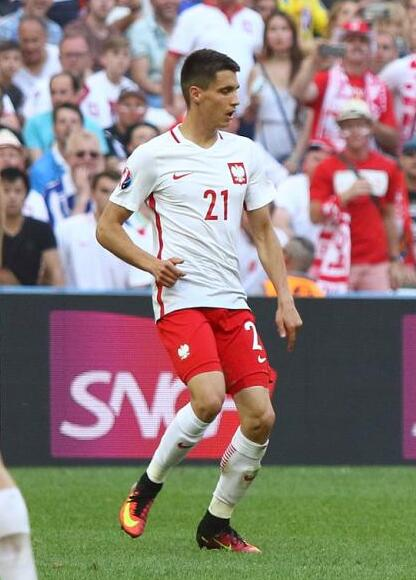
- Kapustka with Poland at Euro 2016

Personal information
- Full name: Bartosz Kapustka
- Date of birth: 23 December 1996 (age 29)
- Place of birth: Tarnów, Poland
- Height: 1.80 m (5 ft 11 in)
- Position: Midfielder

Team information
- Current team: Legia Warsaw
- Number: 67

Youth career
- –2010: Tarnovia Tarnów
- 2010–2011: Hutnik Kraków
- 2011–2012: Tarnovia Tarnów
- 2012–2014: Cracovia

Senior career*
Years	Team	Apps	(Gls)
2012–2016	Cracovia	60	(6)
2016–2020	Leicester City	0	(0)
2017–2018	→ SC Freiburg II (loan)	2	(0)
2017–2018	→ SC Freiburg (loan)	7	(1)
2018–2019	→ OH Leuven (loan)	21	(3)
2020–	Legia Warsaw	133	(20)
2023–	Legia Warsaw II	2	(2)

International career^{‡}
2012	Poland U17	1	(0)
2013–2014	Poland U18	5	(0)
2014–2015	Poland U19	7	(1)
2015	Poland U20	1	(0)
2017–2019	Poland U21	16	(1)
2015–	Poland	22	(3)
- * Club domestic league appearances and goals as of 16:46, 16 August 2026 (UTC) ‡ National team caps and goals as of 17:41, 31 May 2026 (UTC)

Bartosz Kapustka (born 23 December 1996) is a Polish professional footballer who plays as a midfielder for Ekstraklasa club Legia Warsaw, which he captains, and the Poland national team.

== Club career ==
=== Cracovia ===
In October 2012, he started his career after being promoted to Cracovia first team squad.

=== Leicester City ===
Kapustka was signed by Premier League club Leicester City for a reported £7.5m in August 2016, signing a five-year contract. He cited manager Claudio Ranieri as his motivation for joining the club. Ranieri admitted he was unsure when Kapustka "will be ready to play in the Premier League". Having already played for the Leicester Under-23s, a loan move was not possible due to FIFA rules prohibiting a player from appearing for three clubs in one season.

Kapustka finally made his senior debut for Leicester in a 2–1 FA Cup third-round win at Everton on 7 January 2017, coming on as an 84th-minute substitute for Marc Albrighton. He made his full debut in a 3–1 FA Cup fourth-round replay win over Derby County on 8 February 2017, playing in a central attacking role behind striker Ahmed Musa. Kapustka made 47 touches and two interceptions before he was replaced by Riyad Mahrez in the 81st minute.

==== SC Freiburg (loan) ====
On 14 July 2017, Kapustka joined Bundesliga club SC Freiburg on loan for 2017–18 season. The Breisgau-based side secured an option to sign him permanently at the end of the season for a transfer fee of €5 million.

==== OH Leuven (loan) ====
On 31 August 2018, Kapustka joined Belgian First Division B club Oud-Heverlee Leuven on loan for 2018–19 season.

=== Legia Warsaw ===
On 13 August 2020, Kapustka joined Polish Ekstraklasa club Legia Warsaw on a two-year contract.

== International career ==
On 7 September 2015, Kapustka made his debut appearance for the Poland national team in a match against Gibraltar, substituting Jakub Błaszczykowski. He scored his first goal for the national team on his debut. In the buildup to the Euro 2016, Kapustka was involved in a brawl outside a night club, in which he sustained an injury. Following the incident, he made a phone call personally to Poland national team manager Adam Nawałka, to ask for his forgiveness and ask that he not be excluded from the squad for the upcoming tournament. Kapustka was eventually selected for Poland's Euro 2016 campaign, and produced a standout performance in the team's opening match victory over Northern Ireland.

== Career statistics ==
=== Club ===
As of match played 23 May 2026

Appearances and goals by club, season and competition
Club	Season	League			National cup (Note: Includes Polish Cup, FA Cup, DFB-Pokal)		Continental		Other		Total	
Club	Season	Division	Apps	Goals	Apps	Goals	Apps	Goals	Apps	Goals	Apps	Goals
Cracovia	2013–14	Ekstraklasa	2	0	0	0	—		—		2	0
Cracovia	2014–15	Ekstraklasa	23	2	3	1	—		—		26	3
Cracovia	2015–16	Ekstraklasa	33	4	2	1	—		—		35	5
Cracovia	2016–17	Ekstraklasa	2	0	—		0	0	—		2	0
Cracovia	Total		60	6	5	2	0	0	—		65	8
Leicester City	2016–17	Premier League	0	0	3	0	—		1 (Note: Appearance in the International Champions Cup)	0	4	0
SC Freiburg (loan)	2017–18	Bundesliga	7	1	2	0	0	0	—		9	1
SC Freiburg II (loan)	2017–18	Regionalliga Südwest	2	0	—		—		—		2	0
OH Leuven (loan)	2018–19	Belgian First Division B	21	3	—		—		—		21	3
Legia Warsaw	2020–21	Ekstraklasa	25	3	3	0	3 (Note: One appearance in UEFA Champions League, two appearances in UEFA Europa League)	0	1 (Note: Appearance in Polish Super Cup)	0	32	3
Legia Warsaw	2021–22	Ekstraklasa	4	0	0	0	3 (Note: Appearances in UEFA Champions League)	1	1	0	8	1
Legia Warsaw	2022–23	Ekstraklasa	29	2	5	0	—		—		34	2
Legia Warsaw	2023–24	Ekstraklasa	18	2	0	0	4 (Note: Appearances in UEFA Conference League)	0	0	0	22	2
Legia Warsaw	2024–25	Ekstraklasa	25	9	3	1	13	2	—		41	12
Legia Warsaw	2025–26	Ekstraklasa	28	2	0	0	12 (Note: Five appearances and one goal in UEFA Europa League, seven appearances and one goal in UEFA Conference League)	2	1	0	41	4
Legia Warsaw	Total		129	18	11	1	35	5	3	0	178	24
Legia Warsaw II	2023–24	III liga, group I	2	2	0	0	—		—		2	2
Career total			221	30	21	3	35	5	4	0	281	38

=== International ===
As of match played 31 May 2026

Appearances and goals by national team and year
National team	Year	Apps	Goals
Poland	2015	3	2
Poland	2016	11	1
Poland	2024	1	0
Poland	2025	6	0
Poland	2026	1	0
Total		22	3

Scores and results list Poland's goal tally first, score column indicates score after each Kapustka goal.

List of international goals scored by Bartosz Kapustka
No.	Date	Venue	Opponent	Score	Result	Competition
1	7 September 2015	Stadion Narodowy, Warsaw, Poland	Gibraltar	8–0	8–1	UEFA Euro 2016 qualifying
2	13 November 2015	Stadion Narodowy, Warsaw, Poland	Iceland	2–1	4–2	Friendly
3	4 September 2016	Astana Arena, Astana, Kazakhstan	Kazakhstan	1–0	2–2	2018 FIFA World Cup qualification

== Honours ==
Legia Warsaw

- Ekstraklasa: 2020–21
- Polish Cup: 2022–23, 2024–25
- Polish Super Cup: 2025

Individual

- Polish Newcomer of the Year: 2015
- Ekstraklasa Young Player of the Season: 2015–16
- Ekstraklasa Player of the Month: February 2021, August 2024
