= Michał Bartkowiak =

Polish footballer

Personal information
- Full name: Michał Bartkowiak
- Date of birth: 3 February 1997 (age 29)
- Place of birth: Wałbrzych, Poland
- Height: 1.75 m (5 ft 9 in)
- Position: Right winger

Youth career
- –2012: Górnik Wałbrzych
- 2010–2011: Śląsk Wrocław
- 2011–2012: Legia Warsaw

Senior career*
Years	Team	Apps	(Gls)
2012–2014	Górnik Wałbrzych	32	(5)
2014–2019	Śląsk Wrocław	12	(1)
2016–2018	→ Miedź Legnica (loan)	35	(1)
2017–2018	→ Miedź Legnica II (loan)	6	(1)
2019–2020	Foto-Higiena Gać	15	(3)
2021–2022	Górnik Wałbrzych	23	(18)
2022–2023	Polonia Hannover		

International career
2013	Poland U16	4	(1)
2013	Poland U17	2	(1)
2015	Poland U18	5	(0)
2015	Poland U19	2	(0)
- * Club domestic league appearances and goals as of 11:38, 11 June 2024 (UTC)

Michał Bartkowiak (born 3 February 1997) is a Polish professional footballer who plays as a right winger.

== Career ==
Bartkowiak started his career with Górnik Wałbrzych.

== Honours ==
Miedź Legnica

- I liga: 2017–18

Śląsk Wrocław II

- IV liga Lower Silesia East: 2018–19

Górnik Wałbrzych

- Regional league Wałbrzych: 2021–22
- Klasa A Wałbrzych I: 2020–21
