= Tomasz Górkiewicz =

Polish footballer

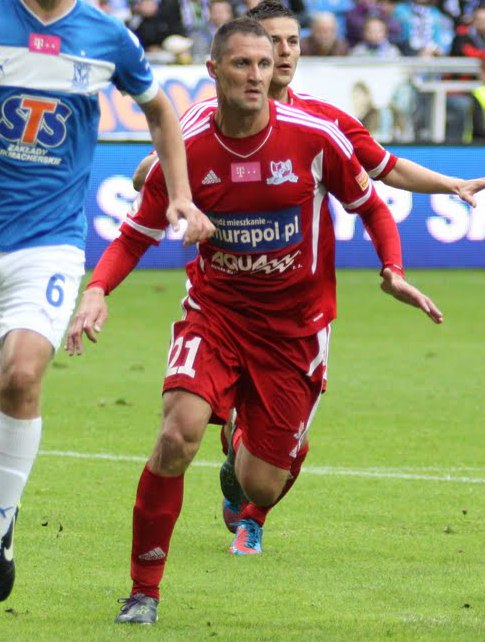

Personal information
- Full name: Tomasz Górkiewicz
- Date of birth: 28 January 1985 (age 41)
- Place of birth: Wadowice, Poland
- Height: 1.85 m (6 ft 1 in)
- Position: Defender

Senior career*
Years	Team	Apps	(Gls)
- Strumień Polanka Wielka
2000–2002	BBTS Bielsko-Biała		
2002–2012	Podbeskidzie Bielsko-Biała	93	(3)
2004	→ Walcownia Czechowice-Dz. (loan)		
2009	→ MRKS Czechowice-Dz. (loan)		
2012	Polonia Bytom	12	(1)
2013–2015	Podbeskidzie Bielsko-Biała	70	(4)
2015–2017	GKS Tychy	38	(1)
2017–2018	MKS Kluczbork	25	(2)
2018–2019	MRKS Czechowice-Dz.	17	(2)
2019–2023	Podbeskidzie II	85	(13)
- * Club domestic league appearances and goals as of 21 December 2024

Tomasz Górkiewicz (born 28 January 1985) is a Polish professional footballer who plays as a defender.

== Career ==
In the summer of 2009, he was loaned to MRKS Czechowice-Dziedzice on a half-year deal. He returned to Podbeskidzie in January 2010.

== Honours ==
Podbeskidzie Bielsko-Biała

- Polish Cup (Bielsko-Biała regionals): 2023–24
