= Krzysztof Danielewicz =

Polish footballer

Personal information
- Full name: Krzysztof Danielewicz
- Date of birth: 26 July 1991 (age 35)
- Place of birth: Wrocław, Poland
- Height: 1.82 m (5 ft 11 1/2 in)
- Position: Central midfielder

Team information
- Current team: Śląsk Wrocław II

Youth career
- –2008: Parasol Wrocław
- 2008–2012: Zagłębie Lubin

Senior career*
Years	Team	Apps	(Gls)
2009	Zagłębie Lubin II	10	(2)
2012	Ruch Radzionków	12	(3)
2012–2014	Cracovia	46	(4)
2014–2016	Śląsk Wrocław	41	(0)
2016	→ Górnik Łęczna (loan)	9	(1)
2016–2017	Górnik Łęczna	17	(1)
2017–2019	Chojniczanka Chojnice	47	(12)
2019–2021	Miedź Legnica	21	(1)
2020	→ Warta Poznań (loan)	9	(1)
2021	Pogoń Siedlce	17	(6)
2021–2024	Stal Rzeszów	86	(12)
2024–2026	Pogoń Siedlce	24	(0)
2026–	Śląsk Wrocław II	0	(0)
- * Club domestic league appearances and goals as of 20:21, 26 May 2026 (UTC)

Krzysztof Danielewicz (born 26 July 1991) is a Polish professional footballer who plays as a central midfielder for and captains II liga club Śląsk Wrocław II.

== Honours ==
Stal Rzeszów

- II liga: 2021–22
