= Damian Dąbrowski =

Polish footballer (born 1992)

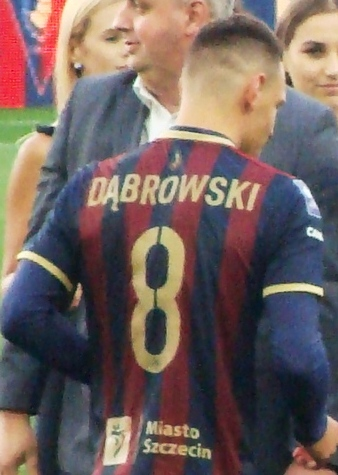
- Dąbrowski with Pogoń Szczecin in 2021

Personal information
- Full name: Damian Dąbrowski
- Date of birth: 27 August 1992 (age 34)
- Place of birth: Kamienna Góra, Poland
- Height: 1.82 m (5 ft 11 1/2 in)
- Position: Midfielder

Team information
- Current team: Zagłębie Lubin
- Number: 8

Youth career
- Amico Lubin
- 2006–2008: Zagłębie Lubin

Senior career*
Years	Team	Apps	(Gls)
2008–2009	Zagłębie Lubin II	6	(1)
2010–2013	Zagłębie Lubin	27	(0)
2012	→ KS Polkowice (loan)	11	(1)
2012–2013	→ Cracovia (loan)	25	(0)
2013–2019	Cracovia	150	(8)
2019–2023	Pogoń Szczecin	113	(5)
2023–	Zagłębie Lubin	89	(2)

International career
2010	Poland U18	3	(0)
2010–2011	Poland U19	8	(0)
2011–2012	Poland U20	4	(0)
2013–2014	Poland U21	9	(0)
2016	Poland	1	(0)
- * Club domestic league appearances and goals as of 17:49, 29 May 2026 (UTC)

Damian Dąbrowski (born 27 August 1992) is a Polish professional footballer who plays as a midfielder for and captains Ekstraklasa club Zagłębie Lubin.

== Club career ==
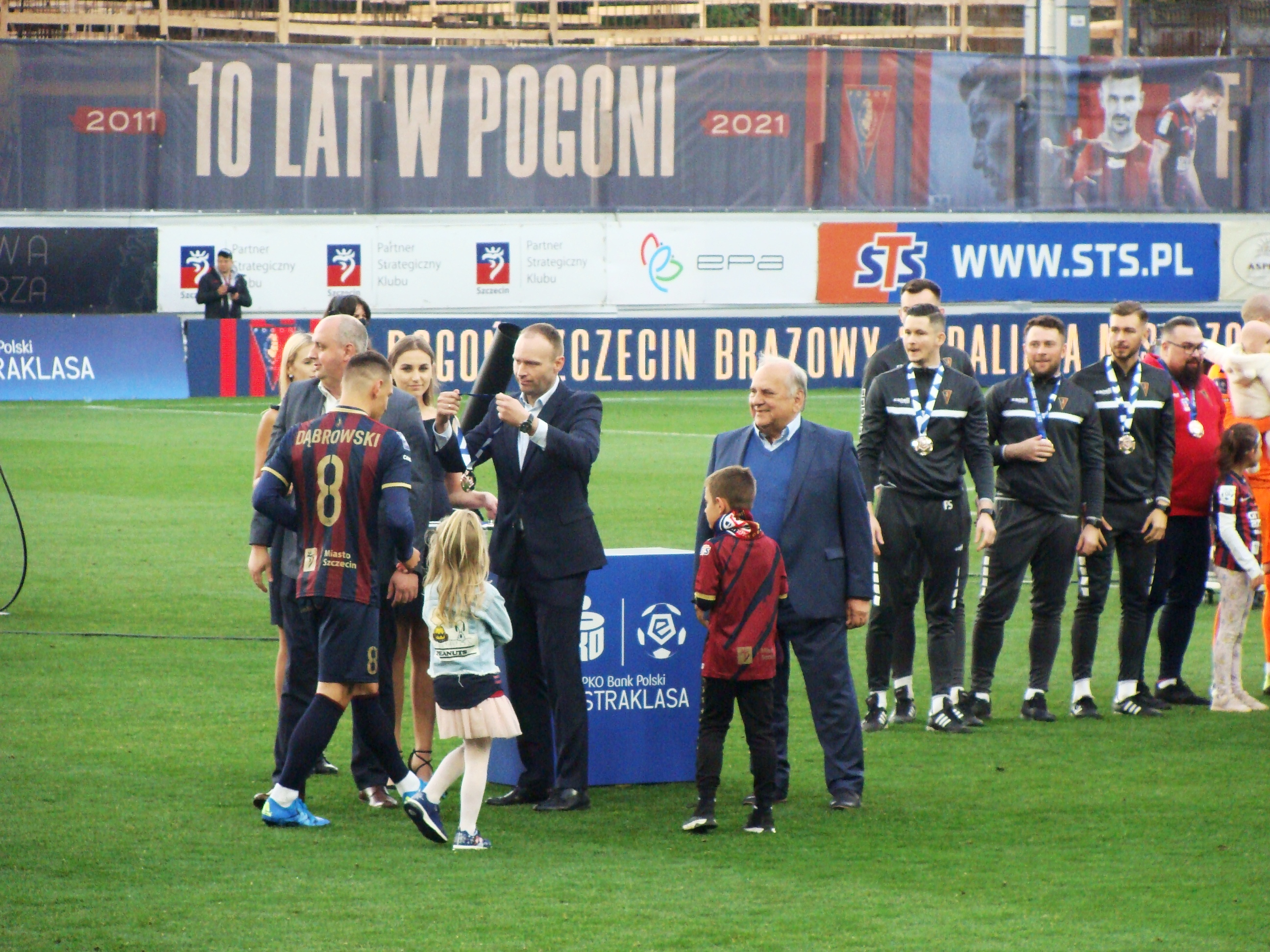
Dąbrowski (number 8) at the end of the 2020–21 Ekstraklasa season with Pogoń Szczecin receiving a bronze medal.

Damian Dąbrowski played in his youth years for Amico Lubin and Zagłębie Lubin. In 2008 Dąbrowski played for the second Zagłębie team and entered the first team in 2010. He played for Górnik Polkowice and Cracovia, on loan from Zagłębie.

From 2013 until 2019, Dąbrowski was a Cracovia player where he earned more than 170 caps. From 2019 to 2023, Dąbrowski played for Pogoń Szczecin and had a spell as the club's captain.

On 16 June 2023, he returned to Zagłębie Lubin on a three-year contract.

== International career ==
Dąbrowski got his first call up to the senior Poland side for 2018 FIFA World Cup qualifiers against Denmark and Armenia in October 2016. On 14 November 2016, Dąbrowski got his first steps on the field against Slovenia in Wroclaw. Dąbrowski went through several Polish junior teams before being invited to the Polish national team’s international match against Armenia in late 2016.

== Career statistics ==
=== Club ===
As of match played 23 May 2026

Appearances and goals by club, season and competition
Club	Season	League			Polish Cup		Continental		Other		Total	
Club	Season	Division	Apps	Goals	Apps	Goals	Apps	Goals	Apps	Goals	Apps	Goals
Zagłębie Lubin II	2008–09	III liga	6	1	—		—		—		6	1
Zagłębie Lubin	2009–10	Ekstraklasa	2	0	0	0	—		—		2	0
Zagłębie Lubin	2010–11	Ekstraklasa	16	0	0	0	—		—		16	0
Zagłębie Lubin	2011–12	Ekstraklasa	9	0	1	0	—		—		10	0
Zagłębie Lubin	Total		27	0	1	0	—		—		28	0
KS Polkowice (loan)	2011–12	I liga	11	1	0	0	—		—		11	1
Cracovia (loan)	2012–13	I liga	25	0	1	0	—		—		26	0
Cracovia	2013–14	Ekstraklasa	31	2	0	0	—		—		31	2
Cracovia	2014–15	Ekstraklasa	36	1	3	0	—		—		39	1
Cracovia	2015–16	Ekstraklasa	25	1	3	0	—		—		28	1
Cracovia	2016–17	Ekstraklasa	31	4	0	0	2 (Note: Appearances in UEFA Europa League)	0	—		33	4
Cracovia	2017–18	Ekstraklasa	3	0	0	0	—		—		3	0
Cracovia	2018–19	Ekstraklasa	24	0	1	0	—		—		25	0
Cracovia	2019–20	Ekstraklasa	0	0	—		2	0	—		2	0
Cracovia	Total		175	8	8	0	4	0	—		187	8
Pogoń Szczecin	2019–20	Ekstraklasa	26	0	2	0	—		—		28	0
Pogoń Szczecin	2020–21	Ekstraklasa	26	0	3	0	—		—		29	0
Pogoń Szczecin	2021–22	Ekstraklasa	29	1	1	0	2 (Note: Appearances in UEFA Europa Conference League)	0	—		32	1
Pogoń Szczecin	2022–23	Ekstraklasa	32	4	2	0	4	0	—		38	4
Pogoń Szczecin	Total		113	5	8	0	6	0	0	0	127	5
Zagłębie Lubin	2023–24	Ekstraklasa	33	1	2	0	—		—		35	1
Zagłębie Lubin	2024–25	Ekstraklasa	31	1	3	0	—		—		34	1
Zagłębie Lubin	2025–26	Ekstraklasa	25	0	0	0	—		—		25	0
Zagłębie Lubin	Total		89	2	5	0	—		—		94	2
Career total			421	17	22	0	10	0	0	0	453	17

=== International ===
Appearances and goals by national team and year
National team	Year	Apps	Goals
Poland
Poland	2016	1	0
Total		1	0

== Honours ==
Cracovia II

- IV liga Lesser Poland West: 2019–20

== Notes ==
- Damian Dąbrowski at 90minut.pl (in Polish)
- Damian Dąbrowski at Soccerway
