= Mateusz Machaj =

Polish footballer

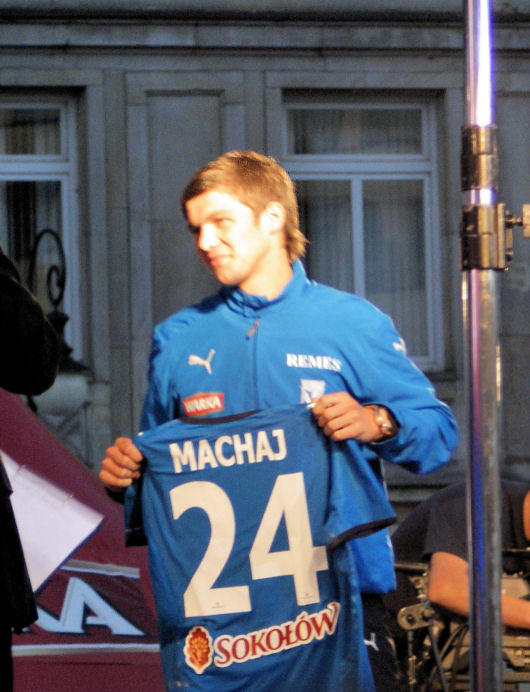
- Mateusz Machaj in 2008

Personal information
- Full name: Mateusz Machaj
- Date of birth: 28 June 1989 (age 37)
- Place of birth: Głogów, Poland
- Height: 1.76 m (5 ft 9 1/2 in)
- Position: Attacking midfielder

Team information
- Current team: Chrobry Głogów II
- Number: 89

Youth career
- UKS SP Głogów
- 2004: UKP Zielona Góra
- 2005–2006: Amica Wronki

Senior career*
Years	Team	Apps	(Gls)
2006–2007	Amica Wronki		
2007–2011	Lech Poznań	1	(0)
2009	→ Polonia Słubice (loan)	13	(0)
2009	→ Tur Turek (loan)	15	(2)
2010	→ Gorzów Wlkp. (loan)	10	(1)
2010–2011	→ Chrobry Głogów (loan)	28	(16)
2011–2013	Lechia Gdańsk	47	(3)
2014–2015	Śląsk Wrocław	42	(3)
2016–2018	Chrobry Głogów	72	(24)
2018–2019	Jagiellonia Białystok	13	(0)
2019–2024	Chrobry Głogów	104	(15)
2024–	Chrobry Głogów II	25	(12)
- * Club domestic league appearances and goals as of 20:46, 24 June 2025 (UTC)

Mateusz Machaj (born 28 June 1989) is a Polish professional footballer who plays as a midfielder for IV liga Lower Silesia club Chrobry Głogów II.

== Career ==
In July 2011, he joined Lechia Gdańsk on a four-year contract.

== Honours ==
Lech Poznań

- Polish Cup: 2008–09

Chrobry Głogów

- III liga Lower Silesian–Lubusz: 2010–11

Individual

- I liga top scorer: 2017–18
- III liga Lower Silesian–Lubusz top scorer: 2010–11
