= Mariusz Pawełek =

Polish footballer (born 1981)

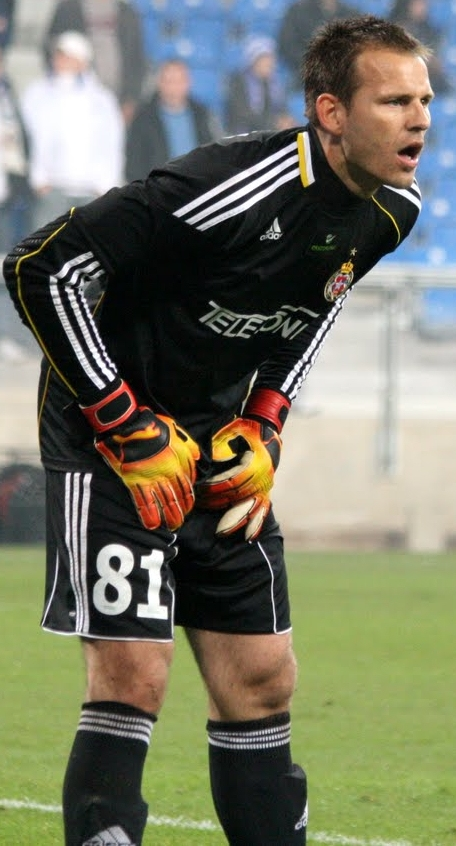
- Pawełek with Wisła Kraków in 2010

Personal information
- Full name: Mariusz Pawełek
- Date of birth: 17 March 1981 (age 45)
- Place of birth: Wodzisław, Poland
- Height: 1.85 m (6 ft 1 in)
- Positions: Goalkeeper; forward

Team information
- Current team: Silesia Lubomia (chairman); Unia Turza Śląska (sporting director)

Youth career
- –1998: Silesia Lubomia

Senior career*
Years	Team	Apps	(Gls)
1999–2005	Odra Wodzisław	49	(0)
2006–2010	Wisła Kraków	101	(0)
2011–2012	Konyaspor	48	(0)
2012–2013	Polonia Warsaw	17	(0)
2013–2014	Çaykur Rizespor	3	(0)
2014	→ Adana Demirspor (loan)	8	(0)
2014–2017	Śląsk Wrocław	79	(0)
2017–2018	Jagiellonia Białystok	12	(0)
2018–2019	GKS Katowice	21	(0)
2019–2021	GKS Jastrzębie	44	(0)
2022–	Silesia Lubomia	79	(15)

International career
2006–2010	Poland	4	(0)
- * Club domestic league appearances and goals as of 21:12, 30 June 2026 (UTC)

Mariusz Pawełek [mariuʂ pavɛwɛk] (born 17 March 1981) is a Polish professional footballer and football executive. A goalkeeper throughout most of his career, he most recently played as a forward for Silesia Lubomia, where he serves as chairman. He is also the sporting director of IV liga Silesia club Unia Turza Śląska.

== Club career ==
On 26 September 2017 Pawełek was signed to Jagiellonia Białystok for the rest of the season to fill in for injured Damian Węglarz. In 2021, he ended his professional football career. On 10 March 2022, he rejoined his childhood club Silesia Lubomia, playing in the Polish sixth division.

== Coaching career ==
Pawełek was appointed goalkeeping coach of GKS Jastrzębie on 23 December 2021. On 14 October 2024, Pawełek amicably parted ways with GKS in order to focus on other projects.

== Honours ==
Wisła Kraków

- Ekstraklasa: 2007–08, 2008–09

Individual

- Ekstraklasa Save of the Season: 2016–17
