= Mari, Paraíba =

Coordinates: 7°03′36″S 35°19′08″W

Mari
- Municipality
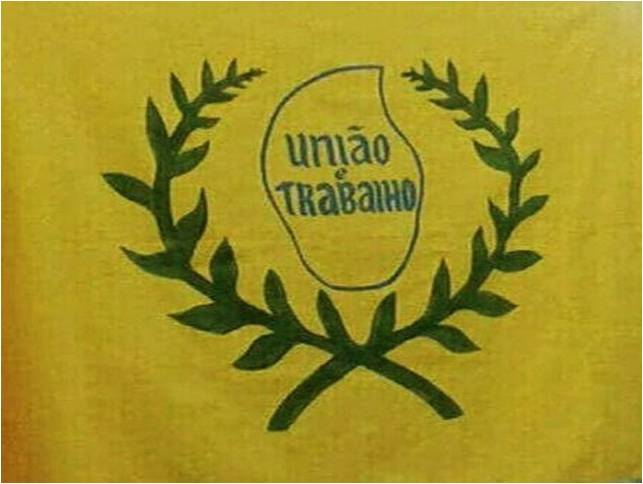
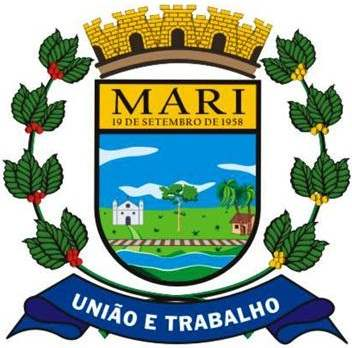
- Flag Coat of arms
- Interactive map of Mari
- Country: Brazil
- Region: Northeast
- State: Paraíba
- Mesoregion: Mata Paraibana

Population (2020)
  - Total: 21,866
- Time zone: UTC−3 (BRT)

Mari is a municipality in the state of Paraíba in the Northeast Region of Brazil.

== See also ==
- List of municipalities in Paraíba
