= Dudu Paraíba =

Brazilian footballer (born 1985)

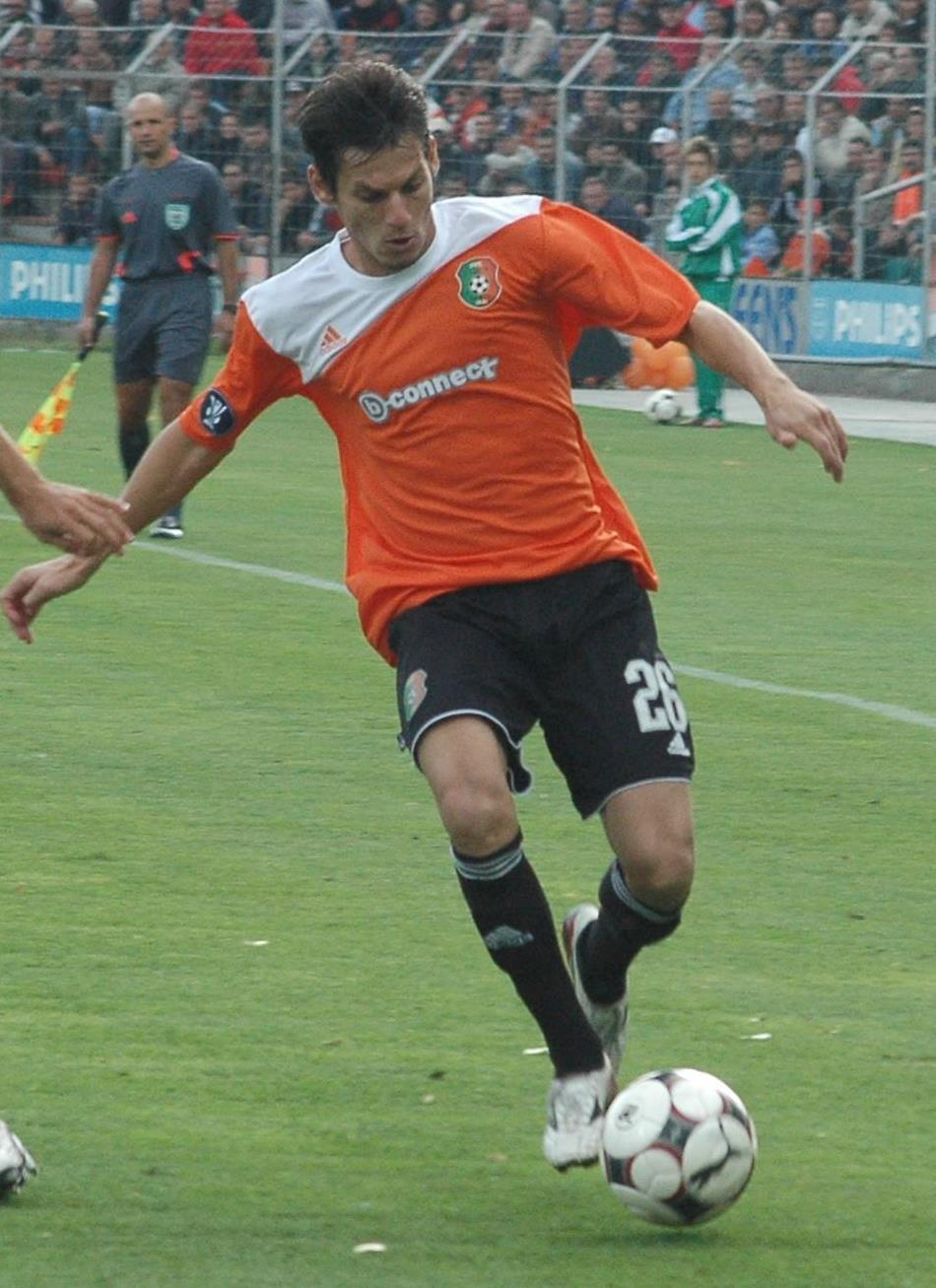

Personal information
- Full name: Carlos Eduardo de Souza Tomé
- Date of birth: 11 March 1985 (age 41)
- Place of birth: Mari, Paraíba, Brazil
- Height: 1.83 m (6 ft 0 in)
- Position: Left wing-back

Youth career
- Botafogo-PB
- Vitória

Senior career*
Years	Team	Apps	(Gls)
2003–2007	Vitória		
2007	→ Avaí (loan)		
2007	Marek Dupnitsa	13	(1)
2007–2008	Litex Lovech	27	(1)
2009–2012	Widzew Łódź	79	(4)
2012–2013	Lobos BUAP	20	(3)
2013–2016	Śląsk Wrocław	86	(6)
2016–2017	Apollon Limassol	2	(0)
2018	URT		
2019	Odra Opole	9	(0)
2020–2022	Perilima		
- * Club domestic league appearances and goals

Carlos Eduardo de Souza Tomé (born 11 March 1985), known as Dudu Paraíba, is a Brazilian former professional footballer who played as a left wing-back.

== Career ==
Dudu Paraíba started his career at Botafogo (PB) and moved to Vitória (BA) in April 2002, where he signed his first professional contract in April 2005.

In January 2007, he was loaned to Avaí, before being sold to Bulgarian club Marek Dupnitsa three months later.

After another three months, he moved to Litex Lovech, where he played one and a half years, before being released in January 2009.

On 29 July 2009, he signed a contract with Polish club Widzew Łódź. In the 2010–11 season of the Polish Ekstraklasa, he was the player with the most goal assists in the entire league. On 22 June 2013, he signed a contract with Polish club Śląsk Wrocław.

== Honours ==
Litex Lovech

- Bulgarian Cup: 2007–08, 2008–09

Widzew Łódź

- I liga: 2009–10
