= Paweł Moskwik =

Polish footballer (born 1992)

Personal information
- Full name: Paweł Moskwik
- Date of birth: 8 June 1992 (age 34)
- Place of birth: Oświęcim, Poland
- Height: 1.79 m (5 ft 10 in)
- Position: Midfielder

Team information
- Current team: Legionovia Legionowo

Youth career
- Hejnał Kęty
- 2008–2011: Unia Oświęcim

Senior career*
Years	Team	Apps	(Gls)
2011–2014	Puszcza Niepołomice	73	(17)
2014–2017	Piast Gliwice	45	(2)
2017–2019	Podbeskidzie	40	(3)
2019–2020	Znicz Pruszków	32	(8)
2020–2022	Motor Lublin	52	(4)
2022–2026	Znicz Pruszków	125	(8)
2026–	Legionovia Legionowo	0	(0)
- * Club domestic league appearances and goals as of 16:19, 26 May 2026 (UTC)

Paweł Moskwik (born 8 June 1992) is a Polish professional footballer who plays as a midfielder for IV liga Masovia club Legionovia Legionowo.
