= Juanito (footballer, born 1988) =

Spanish footballer

Personal information
- Full name: Juan Calahorro Bares
- Date of birth: 12 May 1988 (age 38)
- Place of birth: Torredonjimeno, Spain
- Height: 1.83 m (6 ft 0 in)
- Position: Centre-back

Youth career
- Torredonjimeno
- Jaén
- Betis

Senior career*
Years	Team	Apps	(Gls)
2007–2011	Betis B	57	(2)
2007–2008	→ Alcalá (loan)	25	(0)
2011–2012	Betis	0	(0)
2012	→ Xerez (loan)	10	(0)
2012–2014	Alcorcón	12	(0)
2014–2015	Śląsk Wrocław	16	(0)
2014–2015	Śląsk Wrocław II	2	(0)
2016	Algeciras	10	(0)
2016–2017	Socuéllamos	27	(1)
2017–2018	Caudal	27	(0)
2018–2019	Ontinyent	16	(1)
Total		202	(4)
- * Club domestic league appearances and goals

Juan Calahorro Bares (born 12 May 1988), commonly known as Juanito, is a Spanish former professional footballer who played as a central defender.
