= Bartosz Rymaniak =

Polish footballer (born 1989)

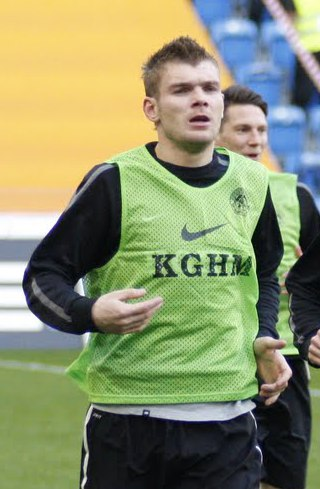
- Rymaniak warming up for Zagłębie Lubin in 2013

Personal information
- Full name: Bartosz Rymaniak
- Date of birth: 13 November 1989 (age 36)
- Place of birth: Gostyń, Poland
- Height: 1.89 m (6 ft 2 1/2 in)
- Position: Right-back

Team information
- Current team: Górnik Polkowice
- Number: 26

Youth career
- Kania Gostyń
- Krobianka Krobia
- 2005: Kania Gostyń

Senior career*
Years	Team	Apps	(Gls)
2006–2007	Kania Gostyń		
2007–2008	Jarota Jarocin	27	(0)
2008–2009	Zagłębie Lubin II	10	(1)
2008–2014	Zagłębie Lubin	103	(2)
2014–2015	Cracovia	37	(0)
2016–2019	Korona Kielce	109	(4)
2019–2021	Piast Gliwice	36	(0)
2021–2022	Górnik Łęczna	24	(0)
2022–2023	Arka Gdynia	16	(1)
2023–2024	Arka Gdynia II	17	(3)
2024–	Górnik Polkowice	48	(4)

International career
2012	Poland	1	(0)
- * Club domestic league appearances and goals as of 18:10, 9 June 2026 (UTC)

Bartosz Rymaniak (born 13 November 1989) is a Polish professional footballer who plays as a right-back for III liga club Górnik Polkowice.

== Career statistics ==
=== International ===
Appearances and goals by national team and year
National team	Year	Apps	Goals
Poland
Poland	2012	1	0
Total		1	0

== Honours ==
Górnik Polkowice

- Polish Cup (Lower Silesia regionals): 2025–26
- Polish Cup (Legnica regionals): 2025–26
