= Łukasz Zejdler =

Polish footballer

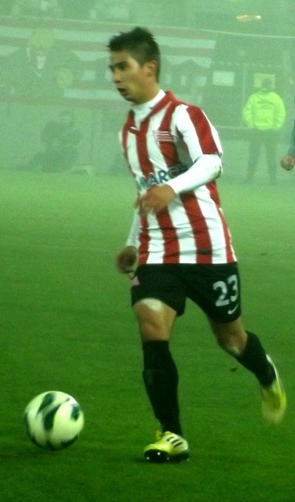

Personal information
- Full name: Łukasz Zejdler
- Date of birth: 22 March 1992 (age 34)
- Place of birth: Racibórz, Poland
- Height: 1.72 m (5 ft 8 in)
- Position: Midfielder

Team information
- Current team: Unia Racibórz (manager)

Youth career
- –2008: Unia Racibórz
- 2010: Baník Ostrava

Senior career*
Years	Team	Apps	(Gls)
2008–2010	Unia Racibórz		
2011–2013	Baník Ostrava	10	(1)
2012–2013	→ Cracovia (loan)	29	(3)
2013–2016	Cracovia	32	(0)
2016–2018	GKS Katowice	60	(5)
2018–2019	Chrobry Głogów	24	(1)
2019–2020	Widzew Łódź	4	(0)
2020	Chojniczanka Chojnice	12	(0)
2020–2022	GKS Jastrzębie	52	(0)
2022–2024	Polonia Bytom	40	(1)
2024	→ LKS Goczałkowice-Zdrój (loan)	3	(0)
2025	Unia Racibórz	0	(0)

International career
2010	Poland U19	2	(0)
2011–2013	Poland U20	2	(0)
2012	Poland U21	2	(0)

Managerial career
- 2025–: Unia Racibórz
- * Club domestic league appearances and goals

Łukasz Zejdler (born 22 March 1992) is a Polish professional football manager and former player who played as a midfielder. He is currently in charge of regional league club Unia Racibórz.

== Club career ==
He is trainee of Unia Racibórz. He made his debut in Gambrinus liga for FC Baník Ostrava on 14 March 2011. On 2 August 2012, he moved to the Polish I liga side Cracovia on a loan deal.

On 18 August 2020, he joined GKS Jastrzębie.

== International career ==
He was a part of Poland national under-19 football team.

== Managerial statistics ==
As of match played 14 June 2025

Managerial record by team and tenure
Team	From	To	Record							
Team	From	To	G	W	D	L	GF	GA	GD	Win %
Unia Racibórz	14 April 2025	Present	10	4	2	4	22	14	+8	40.00
Total			10	4	2	4	22	14	+8	40.00

== Honours ==
Polonia Bytom

- III liga, group III: 2022–23
