= Damian Świerblewski =

Polish footballer

Personal information
- Full name: Damian Świerblewski
- Date of birth: 17 January 1984 (age 42)
- Place of birth: Bydgoszcz, Poland
- Height: 1.80 m (5 ft 11 in)
- Position: Midfielder

Senior career*
Years	Team	Apps	(Gls)
- Zawisza Bydgoszcz
2003	Gryf Sicienko		
2004	Chemik/Zawisza Bydgoszcz		
2004	Chemik Bydgoszcz		
2005–2006	Widzew Łódź	51	(8)
2007	ŁKS Łomża	32	(7)
2008–2009	Podbeskidzie Bielsko-Biała	52	(6)
2010–2011	Ruch Chorzów	12	(2)
2011–2016	Ząbkovia Ząbki	146	(22)
2016–2018	Pogoń Siedlce	53	(2)
2018–2020	Ząbkovia Ząbki	58	(17)
2021	Grom Warsaw	17	(7)
2021–2022	Marcovia Marki	30	(9)
2022–2023	Bug Wyszków	27	(9)
2023–2024	Ząbkovia Ząbki II	16	(6)
- * Club domestic league appearances and goals as of 11 September 2024

Damian Świerblewski (born 17 January 1984) is a Polish professional footballer who plays as a midfielder.

== Honours ==
Widzew Łódź

- II liga: 2005–06
