= Dariusz Zjawiński =

Polish footballer

Personal information
- Full name: Dariusz Zjawiński
- Date of birth: 19 August 1986 (age 40)
- Place of birth: Pruszków, Poland
- Height: 1.85 m (6 ft 1 in)
- Position: Forward

Team information
- Current team: Legionovia Legionowo

Youth career
- Ożarowianka Ożarów Mazowiecki

Senior career*
Years	Team	Apps	(Gls)
2001	Ożarowianka Ożarów Mazowiecki		
2001–2003	Legia Bemowo		
2004	Legionovia Legionowo		
2005	Legia Warsaw	8	(0)
2006–2007	Odra Wodzisław	14	(0)
2007–2012	Świt Nowy Dwór	142	(63)
2012–2014	Dolcan Ząbki	63	(27)
2014–2016	Cracovia	48	(4)
2016–2017	Arka Gdynia	15	(2)
2017–2018	Pogoń Siedlce	45	(10)
2018–2021	Znicz Pruszków	49	(12)
2021–2023	Legionovia Legionowo	65	(24)
2023–2025	Błonianka Błonie	56	(25)
2025–	Legionovia Legionowo	0	(0)
- * Club domestic league appearances and goals as of 10:57, 7 July 2025 (UTC)

Dariusz Zjawiński (born 19 August 1986) is a Polish professional footballer who plays as a forward for IV liga Masovia club Legionovia Legionowo.

== Honours ==
Świt Nowy Dwór

- III liga Łódź–Masovian: 2008–09

Individual

- I liga top scorer: 2013–14
