= Sreten Sretenović =

Serbian footballer

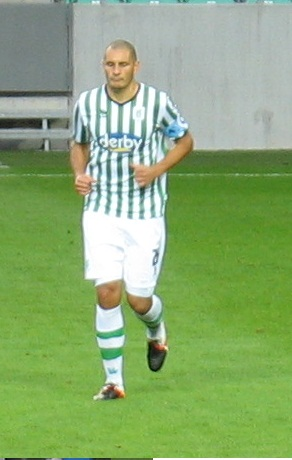

Personal information
- Date of birth: 12 January 1985 (age 41)
- Place of birth: Čačak, SFR Yugoslavia
- Height: 1.92 m (6 ft 4 in)
- Position: Centre back

Youth career
- Rad

Senior career*
Years	Team	Apps	(Gls)
2005–2007	Rad	32	(2)
2007–2008	Benfica	0	(0)
2007–2008	→ Zagłębie Lubin (loan)	19	(0)
2008	Politehnica Timişoara	4	(0)
2009–2010	Kuban Krasnodar	3	(0)
2009	→ Zagłębie Lubin (loan)	2	(0)
2010	→ Leixões (loan)	1	(0)
2011–2012	Olimpija	49	(0)
2012–2013	Partizan	1	(0)
2013–2014	Gyeongnam	65	(2)
2015–2016	Cracovia	31	(0)
2016	BEC Tero Sasana	26	(1)
2017	Borac Čačak	2	(0)
Total		235	(5)
- * Club domestic league appearances and goals

Sreten Sretenović (Serbian Cyrillic: Cpeтeн Cpeтeнoвић; born 12 January 1985) is a Serbian former professional footballer who played as a central defender.

== Club career ==
Born in Čačak, Socialist Federal Republic of Yugoslavia, Sretenović began his career at FK Rad where he quickly came into prominence, his size assuring him a starting eleven spot as the Belgrade club suffered relegation in his first season in the Serbian SuperLiga.

After the 2006–07 campaign, the first since the separation of Serbia and Montenegro, with Rad failing to return to the top division, Sretenović stated his desire to play in western Europe and, on 29 June 2007, was signed by Portugal's S.L. Benfica. However, he was quickly discarded by the man who required his services, Fernando Santos; with the latter's sacking after the first matchday in 2007–08 and the subsequent replacement with José Antonio Camacho, he remained in Benfica's payroll, having been loaned to Zagłębie Lubin in the Polish Ekstraklasa.

In June 2008, Sretenović was transferred to FC Timişoara in the Romanian Liga I. On 20 February of the following year, he was purchased by Russia's FC Kuban Krasnodar for the start of the season.

On 31 January 2011, after an unassuming spell in the Portuguese second level with Leixões SC, Sretenović signed for NK Olimpija Ljubljana. In his second year, he became team captain.
