= KP Unia Racibórz =

Unia Racibórz
- Full name: Klub Sportowy Unia Racibórz sp. z o. o.
- Founded: 27 April 1946; 80 years ago
- Ground: OSiR Stadium
- Capacity: 10,000
- Chairman: Józef Teresiak
- Manager: Łukasz Zejdler
- League: Regional league Silesia III
- 2024–25: Regional league Silesia III, 11th of 16
- Website: https://uniaraciborz.eu
colours	colours

Unia Racibórz is a football club from Racibórz, Silesia, Poland.

== History ==
=== As part of a sports club ===
Unia Racibórz was founded on 27 April 1946 as a men's team. Its initial name was Klub Sportowy Plania Racibórz. The club has undergone several name changes. From June 1949 to November 1949 it was named ZKS Chemik Racibórz, then it was called ZKS Unia Racibórz (until 18 March 1957), and KS Unia Racibórz up to the 1997–98 season before adopting the name RTP Unia Racibórz. Until 2001, the year the women started training, the club had only a men's football team. The women's team was registered for league play in the 2002–03 season.

In January 2008, after discrepancies over the use of finances, the men's section split from RTP Unia and took the name KP Unia Racibórz. Thus RTP Unia Racibórz became exclusively a women's football club.

=== As a section and independent club ===
Men's team of Unia Racibórz won in 1957 regional competition of Opole Silesia, and qualified for the Second Division playoffs. After beating Victoria Częstochowa, Wawel Wirek and Lublinianka, Unia won promotion to the 1958 Second Division, which at that time was the second level of Polish football system, consisting of 24 teams, divided into two groups, North and South. In its first Second Division season, Unia was 4th in Group South, behind Górnik Radlin, Szombierki Bytom and Stal Mielec. Unia was twice U-19 Champion of Poland, in 1954 and 1956. In 1959, Unia was very close to the promotion to the Ekstraklasa, finishing the season in the 2nd spot of Group South of the Second Division, one point behind Zagłębie Sosnowiec.

In 1960, Unia was moved to Group North of the Second Division, finishing the season in the third spot, behind Lech Poznań and Zawisza Bydgoszcz. For the 1961 season, one group of the Second Division was formed, with 18 teams. Unia finished in the 5th position, with Gwardia Warszawa as the champion of the Polish second level. In 1962, after another change, Unia was 4th in Group A of the Second Division. Finally, in 1963, Unia won promotion to the elite Ekstraklasa, finishing as the second team of the national Second Division, four points behind Szombierki Bytom, and one point above Raków Częstochowa.

Unia spent only two seasons in the Ekstraklasa. In 1963/64, it was ranked 8th out of 14 teams and in 1964/65 it was the last team of the league, with only 14 points and a goal difference of 32–75. After relegation, Unia was third in the 1965/66 season of the Second Division, behind Cracovia and Pogoń Szczecin. In 1966/67, it was the fourth team of the Second Division, and in 1967/68, fifth. In 1968/69 Unia again was the fourth team of the Second Division, and in 1969/70, seventh. Finally, in 1970/71, Unia was relegated to the third level, never to return.

The men's team of Unia Racibórz currently plays in the Silesia II group of the regional league, the sixth level of the Polish association football system.

The men's football team of Unia Racibórz were also the U-19 Champion of Poland twice (1954 and 1956).

== Club names ==
- 27 April 1946 - Klub Sportowy Plania Racibórz
- June 1949 - ZKS Chemik Racibórz
- November 1949 - ZKS Unia Racibórz
- 18 March 1957 - Unia Racibórz Sports Club
- 1997 - RTP Unia Racibórz
- 2008 - Klub Piłkarski Unia Racibórz
- unknown - Klub Sportowy Unia Racibórz
- 2022 - Unia Racibórz sp. z o.o.

== Honours ==
- 8th in the Ekstraklasa: 1963–64
- Polish Cup semi-finalists: 1956–57
- Polish U-19 champions: 1954, 1956
- Polish U-19 third place: 1958

== Statistics ==
=== Highest division ===
The club's historic achievement is eighth place in the season 1963-64 season in the first division. It was the first season at the highest league level. In the season 1964-65, Unia finished last and were relegated.

1963/64 - First league
No.	Club	Matches	Goals	Points
1	Górnik Zabrze T	26	59–24	40
2	Zagłębie Sosnowiec (silver)	26	55–41	31
3	Odra Opole (bronze)	26	42–31	31
4	Legia Warsaw	26	44–36	31
5	Polonia Bytom	26	40–35	27
6	Szombierki Bytom	26	45–42	26
7	Ruch Chorzów	26	34–38	24
8	Unia Racibórz	26	45–51	24
9	Gwardia Warsaw	26	35–41	24
10	ŁKS Łódź	26	27–37	23
11	Stal Rzeszów	26	32–44	23
12	Pogoń Szczecin	26	29–36	21
13	Wisła Kraków	26	29–45	21
14	Arkonia Szczecin	26	30–45	18

1964/65 - First league
No.	Club	Matches	Goals	Points
1	Górnik Zabrze T	26	61–35	37
2	Szombierki Bytom (silver)	26	53–44	32
3	Zagłębie Sosnowiec (bronze)	26	57–36	31
4	Legia Warsaw	26	56–31	30
5	Polonia Bytom	26	48–38	26
6	Gwardia Warsaw	26	31–30	26
7	Ruch Chorzów	26	41–41	26
8	Zawisza Bydgoszcz	26	34–41	24
9	ŁKS Łódź	26	25–32	24
10	Odra Opole	26	26–35	24
11	Śląsk Wrocław	26	35–46	24
12	Stal Rzeszów	26	30–35	23
13	Pogoń Szczecin	26	31–41	23
14	Unia Racibórz	26	32–75	14

=== League history ===
Season	League	Position	Comments
1958	II liga	4	southern group
1959	II liga	2	southern group
1960	II liga	3	northern group
1961	II liga	5	
1962	II liga	4	group A
1963	II liga	2	Promoted
1963–64	I liga	8	Highest finish in club history
1964–65	I liga	14	Relegated
1965–66	II liga	3	
1966–67	II liga	4	
1967–68	II liga	5	
1968–69	II liga	4	
1969–70	II liga	7	
1970–71	II liga	13	Relegated
1998–99	Regional league (Katowice III)	10	
1999–2000	Regional league (Katowice III)	1	Promoted
2000–01	IV liga (Silesia II)	4	
2001–02	IV liga (Silesia II)	7	
2002–03	IV liga (Silesia II)	6	
2003–04	IV liga (Silesia II)	8	
2004–05	IV liga (Silesia II)	11	
2005–06	IV liga (Silesia II)	16	Relegated
2006–07	Regional league (Katowice III)	1	Promoted
2007–08	IV liga (Silesia II)	11	Relegated
2008–09	IV liga (Silesia II)	11	
2009–10	IV liga (Silesia II)	12	
2010–11	IV liga (Silesia II)	12	
2011–12	IV liga (Silesia II)	14	
2012–13	IV liga (Silesia II)	14	
2013–14	IV liga (Silesia II)	13	
2014–15	IV liga (Silesia II)	9	
2015–16	IV liga (Silesia II)	11	
2016–17	IV liga (Silesia II)	7	
2017–18	IV liga (Silesia II)	11	
2018–19	IV liga (Silesia II)	14	Relegated
2019–20	Regional league (Silesia III)	7	
2020–01	Regional league (Silesia III)	3	
2021–22	Regional league (Silesia III)	1	Promoted
2022–23	IV liga (Silesia II)	14	Relegated
2023–24	Regional league (Silesia III)	12	
2024–25	Regional league (Silesia III)	11	
