= Marcin Budziński (footballer) =

Polish footballer (born 1990)

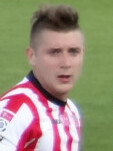
- Budziński with Cracovia in 2015

Personal information
- Full name: Marcin Budziński
- Date of birth: 6 July 1990 (age 36)
- Place of birth: Giżycko, Poland
- Height: 1.84 m (6 ft 0 in)
- Position: Midfielder

Team information
- Current team: Hutnik Kraków
- Number: 27

Youth career
- Mamry Giżycko
- Arka Gdynia

Senior career*
Years	Team	Apps	(Gls)
2008–2012	Arka Gdynia	62	(1)
2012	→ Cracovia (loan)	11	(1)
2012–2017	Cracovia	146	(24)
2017–2018	Melbourne City	17	(5)
2018–2019	Cracovia	14	(0)
2019–2020	Arka Gdynia	12	(0)
2020	Radomiak Radom	2	(0)
2021	Cracovia	2	(0)
2021	Cracovia II	16	(4)
2021–2022	Stal Mielec	7	(0)
2022–2023	Cracovia II	24	(10)
2023–2024	Hutnik Kraków	25	(3)
2024–2025	Sandecja Nowy Sącz	8	(1)
2025–2026	Kalwarianka Kalwaria	6	(1)
2026–	Hutnik Kraków	3	(0)

International career
2008	Poland U19	7	(0)
2010	Poland U20	2	(0)
2009	Poland U21	2	(0)
- * Club domestic league appearances and goals as of 19:09, 31 May 2026 (UTC)

Marcin Budziński (born 6 July 1990) is a Polish professional footballer who plays as a midfielder for II liga club Hutnik Kraków.

== Club career ==
Between 2008 and 2017, Budziński featured in the Ekstraklasa, the top flight of the Polish football system, where he played 200 matches for club sides Arka Gdynia and Cracovia. He made his first appearance in the Ekstraklasa in September 2008.

In September 2017, Budziński transferred to Melbourne City of Australia's A-League as one of the club's marquee players. In June 2018, he and Melbourne City mutually terminated his contract.

Budziński returned to Arka Gdynia in the beginning of August 2019. However, on 31 January 2020, his contract was terminated by mutual consent.

== International career ==
Budziński formerly played for the Poland U21 team. Previously, he played for Poland U-19.

== Career statistics ==
As of match played 30 May 2026

Appearances and goals by club, season and competition
Club	Season	League			National cup (Note: Includes Polish Cup)		Continental		Other		Total	
Club	Season	Division	Apps	Goals	Apps	Goals	Apps	Goals	Apps	Goals	Apps	Goals
Arka Gdynia	2008–09	Ekstraklasa	15	0	1	0	—		9 (Note: Appearances in Ekstraklasa Cup)	0	25	0
Arka Gdynia	2009–10	Ekstraklasa	26	1	2	0	—		—		28	1
Arka Gdynia	2010–11	Ekstraklasa	16	0	0	0	—		—		16	0
Arka Gdynia	2011–12	I liga	5	0	1	0	—		—		6	0
Arka Gdynia	Total		62	1	4	0	—		9	0	75	1
Cracovia	2011–12	Ekstraklasa	11	1	—		—		—		11	1
Cracovia	2012–13	I liga	26	2	1	0	—		—		27	2
Cracovia	2013–14	Ekstraklasa	17	2	1	0	—		—		18	2
Cracovia	2014–15	Ekstraklasa	36	9	2	0	—		—		38	9
Cracovia	2015–16	Ekstraklasa	34	4	3	0	—		—		37	4
Cracovia	2016–17	Ekstraklasa	33	7	1	0	2 (Note: Appearances in UEFA Europa League)	0	—		36	7
Cracovia	Total		157	25	8	0	2	0	—		167	25
Melbourne City	2017–18	A-League	17	5	0	0	—		—		17	5
Cracovia	2018–19	Ekstraklasa	14	0	2	0	—		—		16	0
Arka Gdynia	2019–20	Ekstraklasa	12	0	1	0	—		—		13	0
Radomiak Radom	2019–20	I liga	2	0	—		—		—		2	0
Cracovia	2020–21	Ekstraklasa	2	0	—		—		—		2	0
Cracovia II	2020–21	III liga, group IV	16	4	—		—		—		16	4
Stal Mielec	2021–22	Ekstraklasa	7	0	0	0	—		—		7	0
Cracovia	2022–23	Ekstraklasa	0	0	2	0	—		—		2	0
Cracovia II	2022–23	III liga, group IV	24	10	—		—		—		24	10
Hutnik Kraków	2023–24	II liga	23	3	1	0	—		—		24	3
Hutnik Kraków	2024–25	II liga	2	0	1	1	—		—		3	1
Hutnik Kraków	Total		25	3	2	1	—		—		27	4
Sandecja Nowy Sącz	2024–25	III liga, group IV	8	1	1	0	—		—		9	1
Kalwarianka Kalwaria	2025–26	IV liga Lesser Poland	6	1	—		—		—		6	1
Hutnik Kraków	2025–26	II liga	3	0	—		—		—		3	0
Career total			355	50	20	1	2	0	9	0	386	51

== Honours ==
Sandecja Nowy Sącz

- III liga, group IV: 2024–25
