= Tomasz Hołota =

Polish footballer

Personal information
- Date of birth: 27 January 1991 (age 35)
- Place of birth: Katowice, Poland
- Height: 1.82 m (6 ft 0 in)
- Position: Midfielder

Youth career
- Stadion Śląski Chorzów

Senior career*
Years	Team	Apps	(Gls)
2008–2012	GKS Katowice	85	(6)
2012–2013	Polonia Warsaw	22	(1)
2013–2016	Śląsk Wrocław	89	(7)
2013	Śląsk Wrocław II	1	(0)
2016–2017	Arminia Bielefeld	7	(0)
2017	Arminia Bielefeld II	3	(0)
2017–2019	Pogoń Szczecin	32	(1)
2017–2019	Pogoń Szczecin II	7	(0)
2019–2020	Zagłębie Sosnowiec	25	(0)
2020–2021	KKS 1925 Kalisz	31	(3)
2022–2023	Sparta Katowice	12	(5)
Total		314	(23)

International career
2008–2010	Poland U19	10	(2)
2010–2011	Poland U20	8	(1)
- * Club domestic league appearances and goals

Tomasz Hołota (born 27 January 1991) is a Polish former professional footballer who played as a midfielder.

== Club career ==
On 19 May 2017, he joined Pogoń Szczecin.

On 22 September 2020, Hołota signed a one-season contract with KKS 1925 Kalisz.

== International career ==
He was called up to the Poland national football team in November 2013 for friendlies, but remained on the bench.

== Career statistics ==
=== Club ===
Appearances and goals by club, season and competition
Club	Season	League			Cup		Europe		Total	
Club	Season	Division	Apps	Goals	Apps	Goals	Apps	Goals	Apps	Goals
GKS Katowice	2008–09	I liga	16	1	0	0	—		16	1
GKS Katowice	2009–10	I liga	26	1	1	0	—		27	1
GKS Katowice	2010–11	I liga	15	2	1	0	—		16	2
GKS Katowice	2011–12	I liga	28	2	1	0	—		29	2
GKS Katowice	Total		85	6	3	0	—		88	6
Polonia Warsaw	2012–13	Ekstraklasa	22	1	1	0	—		23	1
Śląsk Wrocław	2013–14	Ekstraklasa	20	3	1	1	4	0	25	4
Śląsk Wrocław	2014–15	Ekstraklasa	34	0	2	0	—		36	0
Śląsk Wrocław	2015–16	Ekstraklasa	35	4	3	0	4	0	42	4
Śląsk Wrocław	Total		89	7	6	1	8	0	103	8
Śląsk Wrocław II	2013–14	III liga, gr. E	1	0	—		—		1	0
Arminia Bielefeld	2016–17	2. Bundesliga	7	0	2	0	—		9	0
Arminia Bielefeld II	2016–17	Oberliga Westfalen	3	0	—		—		3	0
Pogoń Szczecin	2017–18	Ekstraklasa	24	1	0	0	—		24	1
Pogoń Szczecin	2018–19	Ekstraklasa	8	0	1	0	—		9	0
Pogoń Szczecin	Total		32	1	1	0	—		33	1
Pogoń Szczecin II	2017–18	III liga, gr. II	2	0	—		—		2	0
Pogoń Szczecin II	2018–19	III liga, gr. II	2	0	—		—		2	0
Pogoń Szczecin II	2019–20	III liga, gr. II	3	0	—		—		3	0
Pogoń Szczecin II	Total		7	0	—		—		7	0
Zagłębie Sosnowiec	2019–20	I liga	25	0	1	0	—		26	0
KKS 1925 Kalisz	2020–21	II liga	31	3	0	0	—		31	3
Sparta Katowice	2021–22	Reg. Sil. IV	10	5	—		—		10	5
Sparta Katowice	2022–23	Reg. Sil. IV	2	0	—		—		2	0
Sparta Katowice	Total		12	5	—		—		12	5
Career total			314	23	14	1	8	0	336	24

== Honours ==
Sparta Katowice

- Regional league Silesia IV: 2022–23
