= Miroslav Čovilo =

Bosnian footballer (born 1986)

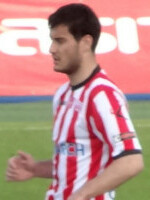

Personal information
- Date of birth: 6 May 1986 (age 40)
- Place of birth: Mostar, SFR Yugoslavia
- Height: 1.95 m (6 ft 5 in)
- Position: Midfielder

Senior career*
Years	Team	Apps	(Gls)
2004–2006	Velež Nevesinje		
2006–2007	Jedinstvo Stara Pazova	8	(1)
2007	→ Novi Sad (loan)	12	(3)
2007–2011	Novi Sad	72	(2)
2010	→ Inđija (loan)	14	(2)
2011	Spartak Subotica	6	(0)
2011	→ Hajduk Kula (loan)	14	(0)
2012	Hajduk Kula	12	(1)
2012–2013	Koper	24	(3)
2013	Domžale	0	(0)
2013–2014	Koper	34	(7)
2014–2018	Cracovia	104	(19)
2018–2021	Lugano	79	(4)
- * Club domestic league appearances and goals

Miroslav Čovilo (Serbian Cyrillic: Мирослав Човило; born 6 May 1986) is a Bosnian former professional footballer who played as a midfielder.

== Career ==
After playing initially with Velež Nevesinje, he moved in 2006 to Serbia where he played with lower league clubs Jedinstvo Stara Pazova and Novi Sad before coming initially on loan in 2010 to Inđija a newcomer back then in the Serbian SuperLiga. In January 2011 he moved to another SuperLiga club, Spartak Subotica. In August 2011 he was loaned to Hajduk Kula, and on late February 2012, he definitely sealed his move to Hajduk. On 3 June 2012, Hajduk Kula supporters elected Čovilo as the best club player for the 2011–12 season.

He extended his contract with Swiss side Lugano for another year in June 2020. He was released by Lugano on 25 August 2021.
