= 2013–14 Legia Warsaw season =

Legia Warsaw
2013–14 season
- Manager: Jan Urban (until 19 December 2013); Henning Berg (from 19 December 2013)
- Stadium: Pepsi Arena
- Ekstraklasa: 1st
- Polish Cup: Round of 16
- UEFA Champions League: Play-off round
- UEFA Europa League: Group stage
- Top goalscorer: League: Miroslav Radović (14)
- Biggest win: 5–0 v Wisła Kraków (Home, 9 May 2014, Ekstraklasa)
- Biggest defeat: 0–3 (Awarded) v Jagiellonia Białystok (Home, 2 March 2014, Ekstraklasa)
Home colours	Away colours	Third colours

The 2013–14 season was Legia Warsaw's 67th consecutive season in the Ekstraklasa and 79th season in existence as a football club. In addition to the domestic league, the club participated in the Polish Cup, the UEFA Champions League and the UEFA Europa League.

== Squad ==
Squad at end of season

Note: Flags indicate national team as defined under FIFA eligibility rules; some limited exceptions apply. Players may hold more than one non-FIFA nationality.

No.	Pos.	Nation	Player
1	GK	POL	Aleksander Wandzel
2	DF	CYP	Dossa Júnior
3	MF	POL	Tomasz Jodłowiec
4	DF	BRA	Alan Fialho
6	MF	BRA	Guilherme
7	MF	EST	Henrik Ojamaa
8	MF	SVK	Ondrej Duda
9	FW	POL	Marek Saganowski
11	FW	POL	Michał Efir
12	GK	SVK	Dušan Kuciak
13	FW	GEO	Vladimir Dvalishvili
15	DF	ESP	Iñaki Astiz
17	DF	POL	Tomasz Brzyski
18	MF	POL	Michał Kucharczyk

No.	Pos.	Nation	Player
19	DF	POL	Bartosz Bereszyński
20	MF	POL	Jakub Kosecki
21	MF	CRO	Ivica Vrdoljak
22	MF	POL	Michał Kopczyński
23	MF	POR	Hélio Pinto
25	DF	POL	Jakub Rzeźniczak
28	DF	POL	Łukasz Broź
32	MF	SRB	Miroslav Radović
33	MF	POL	Michał Żyro
35	MF	POL	Daniel Łukasik
70	FW	POR	Orlando Sá
77	MF	BRA	Raphael Augusto
84	GK	POL	Wojciech Skaba
91	GK	POL	Konrad Jałocha

== Competitions ==
=== Overview ===
Competition	First match	Last match	Starting round	Final position	Record							
Competition	First match	Last match	Starting round	Final position	Pld	W	D	L	GF	GA	GD	Win %
Ekstraklasa	20 July 2013	1 June 2014	Matchday 1	Winners	37	26	3	8	75	34	+41	70.27
Polish Cup	17 August 2013	18 December 2013	Round of 32	Round of 16	2	1	0	1	4	3	+1	50.00
UEFA Champions League	17 July 2013	27 August 2013	Second qualifying round	Play-off round	6	2	4	0	8	5	+3	33.33
UEFA Europa League	19 September 2013	12 December 2013	Group stage	Group stage	6	1	0	5	2	8	−6	16.67
Total					51	30	7	14	89	50	+39	58.82

Source: Competitions

=== Ekstraklasa ===
==== Regular season ====
===== League table =====
Pos	Team	Pld	W	D	L	GF	GA	GD	Pts	Qualification
1	Legia Warsaw	30	20	3	7	60	30	+30	63	Qualification to Championship round
2	Lech Poznań	30	15	8	7	56	34	+22	53	Qualification to Championship round
3	Ruch Chorzów	30	14	8	8	40	38	+2	50	Qualification to Championship round
4	Pogoń Szczecin	30	11	14	5	47	38	+9	47	Qualification to Championship round
5	Wisła Kraków	30	12	9	9	38	30	+8	45	Qualification to Championship round

Source: Ekstraklasa.org
Rules for classification: 1) points; 2) head-to-head points; 3) head-to-head goal difference; 4) head-to-head goals scored; 5) goal difference; 6) number of goals scored; 7) Fair Play table. Head-to-head record is used only after all the matches between the teams in question have been played

===== Results summary =====
Overall								Home						Away					
Pld	W	D	L	GF	GA	GD	Pts	W	D	L	GF	GA	GD	W	D	L	GF	GA	GD
30	20	3	7	60	30	+30	63	12	1	2	35	12	+23	8	2	5	25	18	+7

Source: Soccerway

===== Results by round =====
Round	1	2	3	4	5	6	7	8	9	10	11	12	13	14	15	16	17	18	19	20	21	22	23	24	25	26	27	28	29	30
Ground	H	A	H	A	H	A	A	H	A	H	A	H	A	A	H	A	H	A	H	A	H	H	A	H	A	H	A	H	H	A
Result	W	W	W	L	L	W	W	W	W	W	L	W	D	L	W	W	W	L	W	L	W	W	W	L	D	D	W	W	W	W
Position	1	1	1	2	3	1	1	1	1	1	1	1	1	1	1	1	1	1	1	1	1	1	1	1	1	1	1	1	1	1
Points	3	6	9	9	9	12	15	18	21	24	24	27	28	28	31	34	37	37	40	40	43	46	49	49	50	51	54	57	60	63

Source: Worldfootball.net
A = Away; H = Home; W = Win; D = Draw; L = Loss

===== Matches =====
20 July 2013 1	Legia Warsaw	5–1	Widzew Łódź	Warsaw
18:00 CEST (UTC+2)	Radović 3'; Rzeźniczak 40'; Cichocki (yellow card) 50'; Kucharczyk 53', 57'; Mikita 88'	Report	Kwiek (yellow card) 7'; Rybicki (yellow card) 24'; Staron 60'; Pawłowski (yellow card) 90+3'	Stadium: Pepsi Arena

27 July 2013 2	Pogoń Szczecin	0–3	Legia Warsaw	Szczecin
20:30 CEST (UTC+2)	Lewandowski (yellow card) 36'; Rogalski (yellow card) 45+2'; Djoussé (red card) 66'	Report	Żyro (yellow card) 8'; Bereszyński (yellow card) 29'; Vrdoljak 37'; Jodłowiec (yellow card) 41'; Kosecki (yellow card) 45+2'; Radović (yellow card) 59', (goal) 63'; Dvalishvili 84'	Stadium: Florian Krygier Municipal Stadium

3 August 2013 3	Legia Warsaw	4–0	Podbeskidzie Bielsko-Biała	Warsaw
20:30 CEST (UTC+2)	Saganowski 41'; Pinto 52'; Ojamaa 60'; Dvalishvili 66'	Report	Kwame (yellow card) 64'	Stadium: Pepsi Arena

10 August 2013 4	Ruch Chorzów	2–1	Legia Warsaw	Chorzów
20:30 CEST (UTC+2)	Kuświk 25'; Surma 30', (yellow card) 57'; Stawarczyk (yellow card) 65'; Malinowski (yellow card) 65'; Šultes (yellow card) 74'	Report	Saganowski 49', (yellow card) 70'; Łukasik (yellow card) 76'; Júnior (yellow card) 90+2'; Broź (yellow card) 90+3'	Stadium: Ruch Chorzów Stadium

24 August 2013 5	Legia Warsaw	0–1	Lechia Gdańsk	Warsaw
20:30 CEST (UTC+2)	Vrdoljak (yellow card) 64'; Broź (yellow card) 88'	Report	Buzała 13'; Wiśniewski (yellow card) 39'; Dawidowicz (yellow card) 73'; Matsui (yellow card) 75'; Bieniuk (yellow card) 90+4'	Stadium: Pepsi Arena

31 August 2013 6	Cracovia	0–1	Legia Warsaw	Kraków
20:30 CEST (UTC+2)	Jaroszyński (yellow card) 14'; Kosanović (yellow card) 45'; Steblecki (yellow card) 78'; Marciniak (yellow card) 90'	Report	Radović 29'; Vrdoljak (yellow card) 55'; Broź (yellow card) 76'	Stadium: Józef Piłsudski Cracovia Stadium

14 September 2013 7	Korona Kielce	3–5	Legia Warsaw	Kielce
20:30 CEST (UTC+2)	Janota 59', (yellow card) 60'; P. Sobolewski 77', 89'	Report	Radović 24'; Dvalishvili 25', 47', 69'; Furman (yellow card) 53'; Kucharczyk 68'; Brzyski (yellow card) 83'	Stadium: Stadion Miejski

22 September 2013 8	Legia Warsaw	2–1	Górnik Zabrze	Warsaw
18:00 CEST (UTC+2)	Radović (yellow card) 31'; Vrdoljak 34' (pen.), (yellow card) 90+2'; Jodłowiec 86'	Report	Madej 24'; R. Sobolewski (yellow card) 31'; Przybylski (yellow card) 33'; Nakoulma (yellow card) 38'; Kosznik (yellow card) 90+3'	Stadium: Pepsi Arena

25 September 2013 9	Jagiellonia Białystok	2–3	Legia Warsaw	Białystok
20:30 CEST (UTC+2)	Plizga 45'; Pawłowski 89'; Pazdan (yellow card) 90+4'	Report	Radović 22', 77'; Saganowski 29'; Brzyski (yellow card) 32'; Pinto (yellow card) 75'	Stadium: Stadion Miejski

28 September 2013 10	Legia Warsaw	2–1	Śląsk Wrocław	Warsaw
20:30 CEST (UTC+2)	Jodłowiec 20'; Vrdoljak (yellow card) 21'; Rzeźniczak 77'; Żyro (yellow card) 80'	Report	M. Paixão 5'; Kokoszka (yellow card) 27'; Patejuk (yellow card) 34'; Ostrowski (yellow card) 87'	Stadium: Pepsi Arena

6 October 2013 11	Wisła Kraków	1–0	Legia Warsaw	Kraków
15:30 CEST (UTC+2)	Brożek 82'; Burliga (yellow card) 89'	Report	Żyro (yellow card) 8'; Broź (yellow card) 90+2'	Stadium: Henryk Reyman Municipal Stadium

20 October 2013 12	Legia Warsaw	4–1	Piast Gliwice	Warsaw
18:00 CEST (UTC+2)	Júnior (yellow card) 26'; Dvalishvili 32', 63'; Pinto 60'; Rzeźniczak 65', (yellow card) 82'	Report	Hanzel 47'; Król (yellow card) 48'; Ižvolt (yellow card) 70'; Matras (yellow card) 84'	Stadium: Pepsi Arena

27 October 2013 13	Lech Poznań	1–1	Legia Warsaw	Poznań
18:00 CET (UTC+1)	Trałka (yellow card) 40'; Lovrencsics 50'; Ceesay (yellow card) 85'	Report	Jodłowiec 47'; Rzeźniczak (yellow card) 54'; Vrdoljak (yellow card) 66'; Wawrzyniak (yellow card) 90+1'	Stadium: INEA Stadion

30 October 2013 14	Zawisza Bydgoszcz	3–1	Legia Warsaw	Bydgoszcz
20:30 CET (UTC+1)	Gevorgyan 7', 47'; Luís Carlos 55'	Report	Pinto 24'	Stadium: Stadion Miejski im. Zdzisława Krzyszkowiaka

2 November 2013 15	Legia Warsaw	2–0	Zagłębie Lubin	Warsaw
20:30 CET (UTC+1)	Júnior (yellow card) 9'; Pinto 38'; Dvalishvili 55'	Report	Papadopulos (yellow card) 39'	Stadium: Pepsi Arena; Referee: B. Frankowski

10 November 2013 16	Widzew Łódź	0–1	Legia Warsaw	Łódź
18:00 CET (UTC+1)	Batrović (yellow card) 20'; Bartkowski (yellow card) 90+1'	Report	Rzeźniczak (yellow card) 16'; Jodłowiec 59'; Furman (yellow card) 89'	Stadium: Widzew Łódź Stadium

23 November 2013 17	Legia Warsaw	3–1	Pogoń Szczecin	Warsaw
20:30 CET (UTC+1)	Golla 14' (o.g.); Wawrzyniak (yellow card) 29'; Jodłowiec (yellow card) 33'; Dvalishvili (yellow card) 42', (goal) 63'; Rzeźniczak 43'	Report	Wawrzyniak 4' (o.g.); Akahoshi (yellow card) 25'; Lisowski (yellow card) 26'; Rogalski (yellow card) 68'; Murayama (yellow card) 89'	Stadium: Pepsi Arena; Referee: K. Jakubik

1 December 2013 18	Podbeskidzie Bielsko-Biała	1–0	Legia Warsaw	Bielsko-Biała
18:00 CET (UTC+1)	Deja (yellow card) 7'; Jagiełło 89'; Telichowski (yellow card) 90+4'	Report	Jodłowiec (yellow card) 75'	Stadium: Bielsko-Biała Stadium; Referee: B. Frankowski

4 December 2013 19	Legia Warsaw	2–0	Ruch Chorzów	Warsaw
20:30 CET (UTC+1)	Astiz 34', (yellow card) 66'; Ojamaa 63'	Report	Starzyński (yellow card) 73'	Stadium: Pepsi Arena; Referee: P. Pskit

8 December 2013 20	Lechia Gdańsk	2–0	Legia Warsaw	Gdańsk
18:00 CET (UTC+1)	Grzelczak (yellow card) 8'; Matsui 37' (pen.), 71'; Kostrzewa (yellow card) 73'; Janicki (yellow card) 80'; Wiśniewski (yellow card) 81'	Report	Júnior (yellow card) 30'; Wawrzyniak (red card) 36'; Bereszyński (yellow card) 70' (yellow-red card) 83'; Furman (yellow card) 90+5'	Stadium: PGE Arena Gdańsk; Referee: T. Musial

15 December 2013 21	Legia Warsaw	4–1	Cracovia	Warsaw
18:00 CET (UTC+1)	Kucharczyk 11', 58', 86'; Pinto 37'; Astiz (yellow card) 55'; Jodłowiec (yellow card) 90+2'	Report	Ntibazonkiza 6'; Żytko (yellow card) 45'; Budziński (yellow card) 61'	Stadium: Pepsi Arena

14 February 2014 22	Legia Warsaw	1–0	Korona Kielce	Warsaw
20:30 CET (UTC+1)	Guilherme (yellow card) 42'; Dvalishvili (red card) 53'; Vrdoljak 83' (pen.), (yellow card) 86'	Report	Jovanović (yellow card) 45+1' (yellow-red card) 57'; Marković (yellow card) 52'	Stadium: Pepsi Arena; Referee: P. Gil

22 February 2014 23	Górnik Zabrze	0–3	Legia Warsaw	Zabrze
18:30 CET (UTC+1)	Pandža (yellow card) 28'; Nakoulma (yellow card) 90+4'	Report	Astiz 42'; Radović 78', 83'	Stadium: Ernest Pohl Stadium; Referee: P. Pskit

2 March 2014 24	Legia Warsaw	0–3; Awarded	Jagiellonia Białystok	Warsaw
18:00 CET (UTC+1)	Jodłowiec (yellow card) 15'; Radović (yellow card) 23'	Report	Dźwigała (yellow card) 19'; Pazdan (yellow card) 30'; Quintana (yellow card) 41'	Stadium: Pepsi Arena; Referee: T. Wajda

9 March 2014 25	Śląsk Wrocław	1–1	Legia Warsaw	Wrocław
18:00 CET (UTC+1)	F. Paixão 66' (pen.); Hateley (yellow card) 83'	Report	Augusto (yellow card) 53'; Júnior (yellow card) 65'; Radović 83'; Vrdoljak (yellow card) 85'	Stadium: Stadion Miejski; Referee: P. Gil

16 March 2014 26	Legia Warsaw	2–2	Wisła Kraków	Warsaw
13:00 CET (UTC+1)	Radović 2'; Duda 36'; Júnior (yellow card) 64'	Report	Dudka (yellow card) 25'; Głowacki (red card) 27'; Burliga (yellow card) 41'; Guerrier 66'; Štilić 82'	Stadium: Pepsi Arena; Referee: S. Marciniak

24 March 2014 27	Piast Gliwice	1–2	Legia Warsaw	Gliwice
18:00 CET (UTC+1)	Wilczek 10', (yellow card) 50'; Murawski (yellow card) 54'	Report	Duda 43'; Dvalishvili 90+4'	Stadium: Stadion Piast; Referee: J. Przybyl

29 March 2014 28	Legia Warsaw	1–0	Lech Poznań	Warsaw
15:30 CET (UTC+1)	Radović 37'	Report	Teodorczyk (yellow card) 11'; Linetty (yellow card) 42'; Trałka (yellow card) 69'	Stadium: Pepsi Arena; Referee: P. Gil

6 April 2014 29	Legia Warsaw	3–0	Zawisza Bydgoszcz	Warsaw
18:00 CEST (UTC+2)	Radović (yellow card) 29', (goal) 48', 84'; Żyro 51'	Report	Drygas (yellow card) 63' (yellow-red card) 80'	Stadium: Pepsi Arena; Referee: M. Zlotek

12 April 2014 30	Zagłębie Lubin	1–3	Legia Warsaw	Lubin
18:00 CEST (UTC+2)	Rymaniak (red card) 20'; Przybecki 78'	Report	Sá 2'; Vrdoljak 20' (pen.); Pinto 45'	Stadium: Lubin Stadium; Referee: J. Rynkiewicz

==== Championship round ====
===== League table =====
Pos	Team	Pld	W	D	L	GF	GA	GD	Pts	Qualification
1	Legia Warsaw (C)	37	26	3	8	75	34	+41	50	Qualification to Champions League second qualifying round
2	Lech Poznań	37	19	9	9	68	40	+28	40	Qualification to Europa League second qualifying round
3	Ruch Chorzów	37	16	11	10	47	48	−1	34	Qualification to Europa League second qualifying round
4	Lechia Gdańsk	37	13	13	11	46	41	+5	32	
5	Wisła Kraków	37	14	11	12	51	46	+5	31	

Source: Ekstraklasa.org
Rules for classification: 1) points; 2) points in regular season; 3) head-to-head points in regular season; 4) head-to-head goal difference in regular season; 5) head-to-head goals scored in regular season; 6) goal difference; 7) number of goals scored; 8) Fair Play table. Head-to-head record is used only after all the matches between the teams in question have been played
(C) Champions

===== Results summary =====
Overall								Home						Away					
Pld	W	D	L	GF	GA	GD	Pts	W	D	L	GF	GA	GD	W	D	L	GF	GA	GD
7	6	0	1	15	4	+11	18	3	0	1	10	2	+8	3	0	0	5	2	+3

Source: Worldfootball

===== Results by round =====
Round	31	32	33	34	35	36	37
Ground	H	A	H	A	H	A	H
Result	W	W	W	W	L	W	W
Position	1	1	1	1	1	1	1
Points	35	38	41	44	44	47	50

Source: Worldfootball
A = Away; H = Home; W = Win; D = Draw; L = Loss

===== Matches =====
26 April 2014 31	Legia Warsaw	2–0	Zawisza Bydgoszcz	Warsaw
20:30 CEST (UTC+2)	Żyro (yellow card) 57', (goal) 70'; Duda (yellow card) 71'; Saganowski 88', (yellow card) 90'	Report	Wójcicki (yellow card) 79'; Ziajka (yellow card) 79'; Petasz (yellow card) 79'	Stadium: Pepsi Arena; Referee: T. Wajda

3 May 2014 32	Lechia Gdańsk	0–1	Legia Warsaw	Gdańsk
18:00 CEST (UTC+2)	Makuszewski (yellow card) 27'; Janicki (yellow card) 80'; Deleu (yellow card) 85'; Sadayev (yellow card) 87'	Report	Duda 72'; Brzyski (yellow card) 75'; Ojamaa (yellow card) 84'	Stadium: PGE Arena Gdańsk; Referee: M. Zlotek

9 May 2014 33	Legia Warsaw	5–0	Wisła Kraków	Warsaw
20:30 CEST (UTC+2)	Żyro 20'; Kucharczyk 35'; Jodłowiec 44'; Júnior 58', (yellow card) 58'; Saganowski 78'	Report	Nalepa (yellow card) 22'	Stadium: Pepsi Arena; Referee: B. Frankowski

18 May 2014 34	Górnik Zabrze	2–3	Legia Warsaw	Zabrze
18:00 CEST (UTC+2)	Drewniak (yellow card) 10'; Olkowski 24', 77'; Danch (yellow card) 73'	Report	Duda (yellow card) 38'; Jodłowiec 41'; Żyro 59'; Kucharczyk 62'; Kuciak (yellow card) 80'	Stadium: Ernest Pohl Stadium; Referee: B. Frankowski

25 May 2014 35	Legia Warsaw	1–2	Ruch Chorzów	Warsaw
15:30 CEST (UTC+2)	Vrdoljak (yellow card) 73'; Radović 75'; Saganowski (yellow card) 78'	Report	Starzyński 30' (pen.); Stawarczyk 62'; Szyndrowski (yellow card) 69'; Zieńczuk (yellow card) 89'	Stadium: Pepsi Arena; Referee: S. Marciniak

28 May 2014 36	Pogoń Szczecin	0–1	Legia Warsaw	Szczecin
20:30 CEST (UTC+2)	Dąbrowski (yellow card) 4'	Report	Łukasik (yellow card) 43'; Kucharczyk 73', (yellow card) 74'	Stadium: Florian Krygier Municipal Stadium; Referee: D. Stefanski

1 June 2014 37	Legia Warsaw	2–0	Lech Poznań	Warsaw
18:00 CEST (UTC+2)	Rzeźniczak (yellow card) 18'; Jodłowiec (yellow card) 45'; Vrdoljak 48' (pen.); Bereszyński 85'	Report	Henríquez (yellow card) 18'; Kędziora (yellow card) 33'; Linetty (yellow card) 45'; Trałka (yellow card) 75'	Stadium: Pepsi Arena; Referee: M. Tojo (Japan)

=== Polish Cup ===
17 August 2013 Round of 32	Rozwój Katowice	0–3	Legia Warsaw	Katowice
16:30 CEST (UTC+2)		Report	Saganowski 16'; Kosecki 39', 46'	Stadium: Stadion Rozwoju

18 December 2013 Round of 16	Górnik Zabrze	3–1	Legia Warsaw	Zabrze
19:00 CET (UTC+1)	Zachara 5'; Łuczak 60'; Oziębała 89'	Report	Pinto 71'	Stadium: Ernest Pohl Stadium

=== UEFA Champions League ===
==== Qualifying ====
===== Second qualifying round =====
17 July 2013 First leg	The New Saints (Wales)	1–3	(Poland) Legia Warsaw	Wrexham, Wales (Note: The match was played at the Racecourse Ground in Wrexham, instead of The New Saints regular stadium, the Park Hall, in Oswestry.)
19:15 BST (UTC+1)	Fraughan 11'; Wilde (yellow card) 17'; Baker (yellow card) 54'	Report	Kucharczyk 47'; Saganowski 57'; Dvalishvili (yellow card) 71'; Kosecki 74'; Żyro (yellow card) 90+3'	Stadium: Racecourse Ground; Attendance: 2,925; Referee: Thorvaldur Árnason (Iceland); Assistant referees: Gunnar Gunnarsson (Iceland), Gylfi Mar Sigurdsson (Iceland); Fourth official: Magnus Thorisson (Iceland)

24 July 2013 Second leg	Legia Warsaw (Poland)	1–0 (4–1 agg.)	(Wales) The New Saints	Warsaw, Poland
20:45 CEST (UTC+2)	Dvalishvili 53'; Bereszyński (yellow card) 59'	Report	Darlington (yellow card) 68'; Baker (yellow card) 68'	Stadium: Pepsi Arena; Attendance: 11,712; Referee: Bardhyl Pashaj (Albania); Assistant referees: Ridiger Çokaj (Albania), Gezim Koka (Albania); Fourth official: Emirion Sino (Albania)
Note: Legia Warsaw won 4–1 on aggregate.

===== Third qualifying round =====
31 July 2013 First leg	Molde (Norway)	1–1	(Poland) Legia Warsaw	Molde, Norway
19:00 CEST (UTC+2)	Gulbrandsen (yellow card) 21' (yellow-red card) 74'; Chukwu (yellow card) 29'; Rindarøy (yellow card) 59'; Ekpo (yellow card) 80'	Report	Bereszyński (yellow card) 18'; Dvalishvili 68'; Radović (yellow card) 90+2'	Stadium: Aker Stadion; Attendance: 6,063; Referee: Anastassios Kakos (Greece); Assistant referees: Christos Akrivos (Greece), Dimitris Tatsis (Greece); Fourth official: Athenasios Giachos (Greece)

7 August 2013 Second leg	Legia Warsaw (Poland)	0–0 ((a) 1–1 agg.)	(Norway) Molde	Warsaw, Poland
20:45 CEST (UTC+2)	Vrdoljak (yellow card) 56'; Júnior (yellow card) 72'	Report	Ekpo (yellow card) 69' (yellow-red card) 79'; Tripić (yellow card) 75'	Stadium: Pepsi Arena; Attendance: 23,379; Referee: Alexandru Tudor (Romania); Assistant referees: Cristian Nica (Romania), Aurel Oniţă (Romania); Fourth official: Ovidiu Hațegan (Romania)
Note: 1–1 on aggregate; Legia Warsaw won on away goals.

==== Play-off round ====
21 August 2013 First leg	Steaua București (Romania)	1–1	(Poland) Legia Warsaw	Bucharest, Romania
21:45 EEST (UTC+3)	Piovaccari 34'; Pintilii (yellow card) 37'; Prepeliță (yellow card) 66'	Report	Rzeźniczak (yellow card) 19'; Kosecki 53'; Júnior (yellow card) 56'; Żyro (yellow card) 77'; Kuciak (yellow card) 78'	Stadium: Arena Națională; Attendance: 50,655; Referee: Nicola Rizzoli (Italy); Assistant referees: Andrea Stefani (Italy), Renato Faverani (Italy); Fourth official: Riccardo Di Fiore (Italy); Goal-line assistants: Antonio Damato (Italy), Domenico Celi (Italy)

27 August 2013 Second leg	Legia Warsaw (Poland)	2–2 (3–3 (a) agg.)	(Romania) Steaua București	Warsaw, Poland
20:45 CEST (UTC+2)	Radović 28'; Rzeźniczak (yellow card) 81', (goal) 90+4'; Kuciak (yellow card) 85'	Report	Stanciu 7', (yellow card) 47'; Piovaccari 9'; Filip (yellow card) 18'; Georgievski (yellow card) 34'; Bourceanu (yellow card) 60'; Iancu (yellow card) 90+2'	Stadium: Pepsi Arena; Attendance: 21,514; Referee: Pedro Proença (Portugal); Assistant referees: Tiago Trigo (Portugal), Bertino Miranda (Portugal); Fourth official: Rui Tavares (Portugal); Goal-line assistants: João Capela (Portugal), Hugo Miguel (Portugal)
Note: 3–3 on aggregate; Steaua București won on away goals.

=== UEFA Europa League ===
==== Group stage ====
Pos	Team	Pld	W	D	L	GF	GA	GD	Pts	Qualification	TRA	LAZ	APO	LEG
1	(Turkey) Trabzonspor	6	4	2	0	13	6	+7	14	Advance to knockout phase	—	3–3	4–2	2–0
2	(Italy) Lazio	6	3	3	0	8	4	+4	12	Advance to knockout phase	0–0	—	2–1	1–0
3	(Cyprus) Apollon Limassol	6	1	1	4	5	10	−5	4		1–2	0–0	—	0–2
4	(Poland) Legia Warsaw	6	1	0	5	2	8	−6	3		0–2	0–2	0–1	—

Source: Soccerway

19 September 2013 1	Lazio (Italy)	1–0	(Poland) Legia Warsaw	Rome, Italy
21:05 CEST (UTC+2)	Ederson (yellow card) 30'; Hernanes 53'; Ciani (yellow card) 65'	Report		Stadium: Stadio Olimpico; Attendance: 11,769; Referee: Kristinn Jakobsson (Iceland); Assistant referees: Johann Gudmundsson (Iceland), Gunnar Gunnarsson (Iceland); Fourth official: Sigurdur Oli Thorleifsson (Iceland); Goal-line assistants: Thoroddur Hjaltalin (Iceland), Gunnar Jarl Jónsson (Iceland)

3 October 2013 2	Legia Warsaw (Poland)	0–1	(Cyprus) Apollon Limassol	Warsaw, Poland
19:00 CEST (UTC+2)	Skaba (yellow card) 23'; Pinto (yellow card) 34'; Júnior (yellow card) 77'; Jodłowiec (yellow card) 90'	Report	Sangoy (penalty missed) 24', 56'; Vasiliou (yellow card) 76'	Stadium: Pepsi Arena; Attendance: 100 (Note: The match was played behind closed doors due to punishment by UEFA.); Referee: Martin Atkinson (England); Assistant referees: Peter Kirkup (England), Darren England (England); Fourth official: Simon Long (England); Goal-line assistants: Jon Moss (England), Craig Pawson (England)

24 October 2013 3	Trabzonspor (Turkey)	2–0	(Poland) Legia Warsaw	Trabzon, Turkey
20:00 EEST (UTC+3)	Janko 7'; Zokora (yellow card) 36'; Bamba (yellow card) 62'; Paulo Henrique (yellow card) 68'; Adın 83'; Güral (yellow card) 90+4'	Report	Kosecki (yellow card) 32'; Jodłowiec (yellow card) 36'; Rzeźniczak (yellow card) 78'	Stadium: Hüseyin Avni Aker Stadium; Attendance: 12,871; Referee: Vladislav Bezborodov (Russia); Assistant referees: Nikolai Golubev (Russia), Vyacheslav Semenov (Russia); Fourth official: Maksim Gavrilin (Russia); Goal-line assistants: Aleksei Eskov (Russia), Sergey Ivanov (Russia)

7 November 2013 4	Legia Warsaw (Poland)	0–2	(Turkey) Trabzonspor	Warsaw, Poland
21:05 CET (UTC+1)	Furman (yellow card) 50'	Report	Malouda (yellow card) 35'; Zokora (yellow card) 66'; Júnior 71' (o.g.); Adın 79'	Stadium: Pepsi Arena; Attendance: 14,088; Referee: Ruddy Buquet (France); Assistant referees: Guillaume Debart (France), Laurent Stien (France); Fourth official: Cyril Gringore (France); Goal-line assistants: Fredy Fautrel (France), Benoît Millot (France)

28 November 2013 5	Legia Warsaw (Poland)	0–2	(Italy) Lazio	Warsaw, Poland
19:00 CET (UTC+1)		Report	Perea 24'; Cavanda (yellow card) 52'; Felipe Anderson 57'	Stadium: Pepsi Arena; Attendance: 12,000; Referee: Kevin Blom (Netherlands); Assistant referees: Berry Simons (Netherlands), Hessel Steegstra (Netherlands); Fourth official: Bas van Dongen (Netherlands); Goal-line assistants: Danny Makkelie (Netherlands), Tom van Sichem (Netherlands)

12 December 2013 6	Apollon Limassol (Cyprus)	0–2	(Poland) Legia Warsaw	Nicosia, Cyprus (Note: The match was played at the GSP Stadium in Nicosia, instead of Apollon Limassol regular stadium, the Tsirion Stadium, in Limassol.)
22:05 EET (UTC+2)	Sangoy (yellow card) 37' (yellow-red card) 69'; Roberto (yellow card) 38'	Report	Jodłowiec 8'; Brzyski 63'; Bereszyński (red card) 69'; Mikita (yellow card) 90'	Stadium: GSP Stadium; Attendance: 1,681; Referee: Robert Schörgenhofer (Austria); Assistant referees: Alain Hoxha (Austria), Matthias Winsauer (Austria); Fourth official: Roland Brandner (Austria); Goal-line assistants: Harald Lechner (Austria), Rene Eisner (Austria)
