= 2013–14 Lechia Gdańsk season =

Lechia Gdańsk
2013–14 season
- Manager: Michał Probierz (-Mar 26) Ricardo Moniz (Mar 27 – Jun 4) Quim Machado (Jun 16-)
- Stadium: Stadion Energa Gdańsk
- Ekstraklasa: 4th
- Polish Cup: Quarterfinals
- Top goalscorer: League: Patryk Tuszynski (7 goals); Piotr Grzelczak (7 goals); Stojan Vranjes (7 goals); All: Patryk Tuszynski (8 goals)
- Highest home attendance: 24,276 vs Górnik Zabrze
- Lowest home attendance: 7,705 vs Piast Gliwice
Home colours	Away colours

The 2013–14 Ekstraklasa season was Lechia's 70th since their creation, and was their 6th continuous season in the top league of Polish football.

The season covers the period from 1 July 2013 to 30 June 2014.

== Players ==
=== First team squad ===
Note: Flags indicate national team as defined under FIFA eligibility rules; some limited exceptions apply. Players may hold more than one non-FIFA nationality.

No.	Pos.	Nation	Player
1	GK	POL	Paweł Szokaluk
1	GK	POL	Sebastian Małkowski
2	DF	POL	Rafał Janicki
3	DF	SRB	Nikola Leković
4	DF	POL	Paweł Stolarski
5	DF	POL	Krzysztof Bąk
6	DF	POL	Jarosław Bieniuk
7	DF	POL	Sebastian Madera
8	FW	POL	Patryk Tuszynski
9	FW	POL	Piotr Grzelczak
10	MF	POL	Przemysław Frankowski
11	MF	POL	Maciej Makuszewski
12	GK	POL	Bartosz Kaniecki
13	MF	POL	Wojciech Zyska
14	MF	POL	Piotr Wiśniewski
15	FW	POL	Adam Duda
16	MF	JPN	Tsubasa Nishi
17	MF	POL	Marcin Pietrowski
18	FW	POL	Kacper Łazaj
19	FW	POL	Aleksander Jagiełło

No.	Pos.	Nation	Player
20	FW	POL	Paweł Buzała
21	MF	BIH	Stojan Vranješ
21	MF	POL	Mateusz Machaj
22	MF	POL	Łukasz Kopka
22	MF	JPN	Daisuke Matsui
24	GK	POL	Mateusz Bąk
26	DF	BRA	Deleu
27	DF	POL	Paweł Dawidowicz
28	DF	COD	Christopher Oualembo
29	MF	POL	Łukasz Kacprzycki
30	MF	POL	Maciej Kostrzewa
31	FW	POL	Damian Kugiel
31	DF	POL	Przemysław Kamiński
32	DF	POL	Adam Pazio
34	DF	POL	Bernard Powszuk
36	DF	POL	Damian Garbacik
40	GK	POL	Kacper Rosa
95	FW	RUS	Zaur Sadayev
-	FW	POL	Bartłomiej Smuczyński

=== Transfers ===
==== Players In ====
No.	Pos.	Player	From	Type	Window	Fee	Date	Source
24	GK	Mateusz Bąk	SFC Etar	Transfer	Summer	Free	1 July 2013	
32	DF	Adam Pazio	Polonia Warsaw	Transfer	Summer	Free	1 July 2013	
22	MF	Daisuke Matsui	Slavia Sofia	Transfer	Summer	Free	3 July 2013	
21	MF	Stojan Vranješ	FK Vojvodina	Transfer	Winter	€200k	25 January 2014	
4	DF	Paweł Stolarski	Wisła Kraków	Transfer	Winter	€30k	28 January 2014	
6	FW	Zaur Sadayev	FC Akhmat Grozny	Loan	Winter	Free	29 January 2014	
11	MF	Maciej Makuszewski	FC Akhmat Grozny	Loan	Winter	Free	29 January 2014	
3	DF	Nikola Leković	FK Vojvodina	Transfer	Winter	Free	12 February 2014	
16	MF	Tsubasa Nishi	Gwardia Koszalin	Transfer	Winter	Free	27 February 2014	
1	GK	Paweł Szokaluk	Chełmianka Chełm	Transfer	Winter	Free	28 March 2014	

==== Out ====
No.	Pos.	Player	To	Type	Window	Fee	Date	Source
19	FW	Ricardinho	FC Sheriff Tiraspol	Transfer	Summer	€350k	1 July 2013	
8	MF	Łukasz Surma	Ruch Chorzów	Transfer	Summer	Free	1 July 2013	
11	FW	Grzegorz Rasiak	Warta Poznań	Transfer	Summer	Free	18 July 2013	
20	DF	Levon Hayrapetyan	Widzew Łódź	Transfer	Summer	Free	19 July 2013	-
46	DF	Adrian Bielawski	Olimpia Grudziądz	Loan	Summer	Free	23 July 2013	
19	FW	Michał Pruchnik	Stal Mielec	Transfer	Summer	€5k	30 July 2013	
22	FW	Mohammed Rahoui	SA Mohammadia	Transfer	Summer	Free	16 August 2013	
1	GK	Michal Buchalik	Ruch Chorzów	Transfer	Summer	Free	30 August 2013	
20	FW	Julian Ripoli	Universitatea Craiova	Transfer	Summer	Free	20 September 2013	
4	DF	Piotr Brożek	Wisła Kraków	Transfer	Summer	Free	28 October 2013	
22	MF	Daisuke Matsui	Júbilo Iwata	Transfer	Winter	€400k	1 January 2014	
15	FW	Adam Duda	Chojniczanka Chojnice	Loan	Winter	Free	31 January 2014	
18	FW	Kacper Łazaj	Kolejarz Stróże	Loan	Winter	Free	14 February 2014	
29	MF	Łukasz Kacprzycki	Wisła Płock	Loan	Winter	Free	17 February 2014	
21	MF	Mateusz Machaj	Śląsk Wrocław	Transfer	Winter	Free	22 February 2014	
1	GK	Sebastian Małkowski	Bytovia Bytów	Transfer	Winter	Free	28 February 2014	

== Friendlies ==
=== Summer ===
29 June 2013	Lechia Gdańsk	2–0	Flota Świnoujście	Gdańsk
	Paweł Buzała 18'; Patryk Tuszynski 25'			Stadium: MOSiR Stadium

14 July 2013	Lechia Gdańsk	2–0	Bałtyk Gdynia	Gdańsk
	Mateusz Machaj 38'; Paweł Dawidowicz 51'			Stadium: MOSiR Stadium

30 July 2013	Lechia Gdańsk	2–2	Barcelona	Gdańsk
19:45 BST	Jarosław Bieniuk 15'; Piotr Grzelczak 50'		Sergi Roberto 26'; Lionel Messi 57'	Stadium: Stadion Energa Gdańsk

=== Winter ===
11 January 2014	Lechia Gdańsk	1–4	Widzew Łódź	Grodzisk Wielkopolski
15:00 BST	Sebastian Madera 32'		Veljko Batrović 37', 45'; Michał Jonczyk 87'; Mariusz Rybicki 88'	Stadium: Arena Lublin

15 January 2014	Lechia Gdańsk	3–0	Dolcan Ząbki	Grodzisk Wielkopolski
15:30 BST			Patryk Tuszyński 11'; Łukasz Kacprzycki 14'; Paweł Buzała 56'	Stadium: Arena Lublin

18 January 2014	Lech Poznań	1–0	Lechia Gdańsk	Jarocin
10:00 BST	Daylon Claasen 88'			Stadium: Stadion Miejski

18 January 2014	Warta Poznań	4–0	Lechia Gdańsk	Jarocin
12:30 BST	Grzegorz Rasiak 23'; Przemysław Kocot 45'; Michał Goliński 75'; Karol Gregorek 83'			Stadium: Stadion Miejski

21 January 2014	Lechia Gdańsk	1–2	Gryf Wejherowo	Gdańsk
14:10 BST	Paweł Buzała 51'		Łukasz Pietron 61' (pen.); Rafał Siemaszko 66'	Stadium: MOSiR Stadium

1 February 2014	Lechia Gdańsk	2–0	SR Brașov	Gdańsk
15:00 BST	Patryk Tuszynski 40'; Rafał Janicki 59'			Stadium: MOSiR Stadium

== Regular season ==
=== Fixtures for the 2013–14 Ekstraklasa season ===
22 July 2013 1	Lechia Gdańsk	2–2	Podbeskidzie Bielsko-Biała	Gdańsk
17:00 BST	Daisuke Matsui 79', 88'		Marcin Wodecki 23'; Błażej Telichowski 90+3'	Stadium: Stadion Energa Gdańsk; Attendance: 11,645

26 July 2013 2	Ruch Chorzów	1–1	Lechia Gdańsk	Chorzów
17:00 BST	Marcin Malinowski 18'		Deleu 3'	Stadium: Stadion Miejski; Attendance: 5,200

5 August 2013 3	Lechia Gdańsk	2–0	Jagiellonia Białystok	Gdańsk
17:00 BST	Paweł Buzała 16'; Sebastian Madera 80'			Stadium: Stadion Energa Gdańsk; Attendance: 12,569

10 August 2013 4	Lechia Gdańsk	3–1	Cracovia	Gdańsk
17:00 BST	Marcin Pietrowski 8'; Piotr Wiśniewski 47'; Paweł Buzała 84'		Edgar Bernhardt 25'	Stadium: Stadion Energa Gdańsk; Attendance: 14,735

24 August 2013 5	Legia Warsaw	0–1	Lechia Gdańsk	Warsaw
19:30 BST			Paweł Buzała 13'	Stadium: Polish Army Stadium; Attendance: 16,682

30 August 2013 6	Lechia Gdańsk	1–1	Górnik Zabrze	Gdańsk
17:00 GMT	Marcin Pietrowski 81' (pen.)		Mariusz Przybylski 62'	Stadium: Stadion Energa Gdańsk; Attendance: 24,276

15 September 2013 7	Pogoń Szczecin	1–1	Lechia Gdańsk	Szczecin
17:00 BST	Takafumi Akahoshi 90+1'		Piotr Grzelczak 25'	Stadium: Stadion Florian Krygier; Attendance: 5,300

21 September 2013 8	Lechia Gdańsk	1–1	Zawisza Bydgoszcz	Gdańsk
14:30 GMT	Piotr Grzelczak 25'		Luís Carlos Lima 33'	Stadium: Stadion Energa Gdańsk; Attendance: 17,754

24 September 2013 9	Wisła Kraków	3–0	Lechia Gdańsk	Kraków
19:30 BST	Michał Chrapek 70'; Paweł Brożek 76', 90+3'			Stadium: Stadion Miejski; Attendance: 11,189

30 September 2013 10	Lechia Gdańsk	2–2	Korona Kielce	Gdańsk
19:30 BST	Piotr Grzelczak 30'; Paweł Dawidowicz 38'		Michał Janota 15' (pen.) 19' (pen.)	Stadium: Stadion Energa Gdańsk; Attendance: 9,601

6 October 2013 11	Widzew Łódź	4–1	Lechia Gdańsk	Łódź
17:00 BST	Povilas Leimonas 45'; Kevin Lafrance 45+6'; Eduards Višņakovs 49'; Alex Silva 90+3'		Marcin Pietrowski 19' (pen.)	Stadium: Stadion Widzewa; Attendance: 6,000

19 October 2013 12	Lechia Gdańsk	1–4	Lech Poznań	Gdańsk
19:30 GMT	Deleu 24'		Łukasz Teodorczyk 36', 81'; Gergő Lovrencsics 50'; Kasper Hämäläinen 69'	Stadium: Stadion Energa Gdańsk; Attendance: 14,690

26 October 2013 13	Piast Gliwice	0–0	Lechia Gdańsk	Gliwice
17:00 BST				Stadium: Stadion Piast; Attendance: 4,000

30 October 2013 14	Zagłębie Lubin	1–3	Lechia Gdańsk	Lubin
17:00 BST	David Solomon Abwo 79'		Przemysław Frankowski 19'; Piotr Grzelczak 72'; Paweł Buzała 90+4'	Stadium: Stadion Zagłębia Lubin; Attendance: 4,738

3 November 2013 15	Lechia Gdańsk	1–2	Śląsk Wrocław	Gdańsk
14:30 BST	Piotr Grzelczak 55'		Adam Kokoszka 63'; Rafał Grodzicki 81'	Stadium: Stadion Energa Gdańsk; Attendance: 12,365

9 November 2013 16	Podbeskidzie Bielsko-Biała	3–1	Lechia Gdańsk	Bielsko-Biała
17:00 GMT	Marek Sokołowski 43'; Fabian Pawela 63'; Aleksander Jagiełło 90+2'		Rafał Janicki 65'	Stadium: Stadion Miejski; Attendance: 2,900

24 November 2013 17	Lechia Gdańsk	0–0	Ruch Chorzów	Gdańsk
14:30 GMT				Stadium: Stadion Energa Gdańsk; Attendance: 9,846

28 November 2013 18	Jagiellonia Białystok	0–1	Lechia Gdańsk	Białystok
14:30 GMT			Piotr Wiśniewski 79'	Stadium: Białystok City Stadium; Attendance: 2,730

4 December 2013 19	Cracovia	2–1	Lechia Gdańsk	Kraków
17:00 GMT	Miloš Kosanović 64', 81' (pen.)		Piotr Wiśniewski 75'	Stadium: Marshal Józef Piłsudski Stadium; Attendance: 7,173

8 December 2013 20	Lechia Gdańsk	2–0	Legia Warsaw	Gdańsk
17:00 GMT	Daisuke Matsui 37' (pen.) 70' (pen.)			Stadium: Stadion Energa Gdańsk; Attendance: 8,000

14 December 2013 21	Górnik Zabrze	0–0	Lechia Gdańsk	Zabrze
19:30 GMT				Stadium: Ernest Pohl Stadium; Attendance: 3,000

15 February 2014 22	Lechia Gdańsk	2–3	Pogoń Szczecin	Gdańsk
14:30 GMT	Patryk Tuszynski 51', 81' (pen.)		Maciej Dąbrowski 39'; Marcin Robak 76'; Jakub Bąk 90+1'	Stadium: Stadion Energa Gdańsk; Attendance: 8,170

24 February 2014 23	Zawisza Bydgoszcz	0–3	Lechia Gdańsk	Bydgoszcz
17:00 GMT			Patryk Tuszynski 25', 46', 79'	Stadium: Zdzisław Krzyszkowiak Stadium; Attendance: 1,620

28 February 2014 24	Lechia Gdańsk	0–0	Wisła Kraków	Gdańsk
19:30 GMT				Stadium: Stadion Energa Gdańsk; Attendance: 11,291

7 March 2014 25	Korona Kielce	1–0	Lechia Gdańsk	Kielce
17:00 GMT	Vlastimir Jovanović 56'			Stadium: Kielce City Stadium; Attendance: 5,530

15 March 2014 26	Lechia Gdańsk	2–0	Widzew Łódź	Gdańsk
14:30 GMT	Stojan Vranješ 29', 76'			Stadium: Stadion Energa Gdańsk; Attendance: 9,175

22 March 2014 27	Lech Poznań	2–1	Lechia Gdańsk	Poznań
17:30 GMT	Szymon Pawłowski 32'; Łukasz Teodorczyk 32'		Patryk Tuszynski 90+2'	Stadium: Stadion Miejski; Attendance: 22,947

29 March 2014 28	Lechia Gdańsk	3–1	Piast Gliwice	Gdańsk
14:30 GMT	Piotr Grzelczak 49'; Maciej Makuszewski 57'; Stojan Vranješ 64'		Rubén Jurado 90+6'	Stadium: Stadion Energa Gdańsk; Attendance: 7,705

5 April 2014 29	Lechia Gdańsk	2–1	Zagłębie Lubin	Gdańsk
14:30 GMT	Piotr Grzelczak 3'; Maciej Makuszewski 86'		Aleksander Kwiek 13'	Stadium: Stadion Energa Gdańsk; Attendance: 11,695

12 April 2014 30	Śląsk Wrocław	1–0	Lechia Gdańsk	Wrocław
17:00 GMT	Flávio Paixão 55'			Stadium: Stadion Miejski; Attendance: 18,046

=== League table ===
Pos	Team	Pld	W	D	L	GF	GA	GD	Pts	Qualification
6	Zawisza Bydgoszcz	30	11	9	10	43	37	+6	42 (Note: ZAW 3-1 GÓR; GÓR 3-2 ZAW)	Qualification to Championship round
7	Górnik Zabrze	30	11	9	10	42	46	−4	42	Qualification to Championship round
8	Lechia Gdańsk	30	10	10	10	38	37	+1	40	Qualification to Championship round
9	Cracovia	30	11	6	13	37	43	−6	39 (Note: CRA 1-0 JAG; JAG 1-2 CRA)	Qualification to Relegation round
10	Jagiellonia Białystok	30	10	9	11	46	43	+3	39	Qualification to Relegation round

Source: Ekstraklasa.org
Rules for classification: 1) points; 2) head-to-head points; 3) head-to-head goal difference; 4) head-to-head goals scored; 5) goal difference; 6) number of goals scored; 7) Fair Play table. Head-to-head record is used only after all the matches between the teams in question have been played

== Championship round ==
=== Championship round fixtures ===
27 April 2014 31	Ruch Chorzów	0–0	Lechia Gdańsk	Chorzów
17:00 BST				Stadium: Stadion Miejski; Attendance: 6,500

3 May 2014 32	Lechia Gdańsk	0–1	Legia Warsaw	Gdańsk
17:00 BST			Ondrej Duda 72'	Stadium: Stadion Energa Gdańsk; Attendance: 18,623

10 May 2014 33	Pogoń Szczecin	0–2	Lechia Gdańsk	Szczecin
17:00 BST			Maciej Makuszewski 33'; Zaur Sadayev 38'	Stadium: Stadion Florian Krygier; Attendance: 6,894

16 May 2014 34	Lechia Gdańsk	2–1	Lech Poznań	Gdańsk
19:30 BST	Zaur Sadayev 22', 41'		Mateusz Możdżeń 26'	Stadium: Stadion Energa Gdańsk; Attendance: 16,628

25 May 2014 35	Zawisza Bydgoszcz	0–0	Lechia Gdańsk	Bydgoszcz
17:00 GMT				Stadium: Zdzisław Krzyszkowiak Stadium; Attendance: 2,000

28 May 2014 36	Lechia Gdańsk	2–2	Wisła Kraków	Gdańsk
19:30 GMT	Stojan Vranješ 66' (pen.), 90+2' (pen.)		Semir Štilić 19', 81' (pen.)	Stadium: Stadion Energa Gdańsk; Attendance: 12,433

1 June 2014 37	Górnik Zabrze	0–2	Lechia Gdańsk	Zabrze
17:00 BST			Stojan Vranješ 69', 90+3'	Stadium: Ernest Pohl Stadium; Attendance: 3,000

=== League table ===
Pos	Team	Pld	W	D	L	GF	GA	GD	Pts	Qualification
2	Lech Poznań	37	19	9	9	68	40	+28	40	Qualification to Europa League second qualifying round
3	Ruch Chorzów	37	16	11	10	47	48	−1	34	Qualification to Europa League second qualifying round
4	Lechia Gdańsk	37	13	13	11	46	41	+5	32	
5	Wisła Kraków	37	14	11	12	51	46	+5	31	
6	Górnik Zabrze	37	14	10	13	53	57	−4	31	

Source: Ekstraklasa.org
Rules for classification: 1) points; 2) points in regular season; 3) head-to-head points in regular season; 4) head-to-head goal difference in regular season; 5) head-to-head goals scored in regular season; 6) goal difference; 7) number of goals scored; 8) Fair Play table. Head-to-head record is used only after all the matches between the teams in question have been played

== Polish Cup ==
17 August 2013 Round of 32	Siarka Tarnobrzeg	0–2	Lechia Gdańsk	Tarnobrzeg
14:30 GMT			Jarosław Bieniuk 49'; Piotr Wiśniewski 61' (pen.)	Stadium: Stadion OSiR Wisła

22 October 2013 Round of 16	Wisła Kraków	0–1	Lechia Gdańsk	Kraków
11:00 GMT			Paweł Buzała 75'	Stadium: Stadion Miejski

12 March 2014 Quarterfinal	Jagiellonia Białystok	2–1	Lechia Gdańsk	Białystok
17:30 GMT	Ugo Ukah 25'; Bekim Balaj 27'		Patryk Tuszynski 66' (pen.)	Stadium: Białystok City Stadium

25 March 2014 Quarterfinal	Lechia Gdańsk	1–1	Jagiellonia Białystok	Gdańsk
19:30 GMT	Bekim Balaj 27'		Przemysław Frankowski 72'	Stadium: Stadion Energa Gdańsk
