= 2014–15 Lechia Gdańsk season =

Lechia Gdańsk
2014–15 season
- Manager: Quim Machado (–Sep 21) Tomasz Unton (Sep 21 – Nov 17) Jerzy Brzęczek (Nov 17–)
- Stadium: Stadion Energa Gdańsk
- Ekstraklasa: 5th
- Polish Cup: Round of 32
- Top goalscorer: League: Antonio Čolak (10 goals); All: Antonio Čolak (10 goals)
- Highest home attendance: 36,500 vs Legia Warsaw
- Lowest home attendance: 7,619 vs Piast Gliwice
| Home colours | Away colours | Third colours |

The 2014–15 Lechia Gdańsk season was the 71st since its founding, and was their 7th consecutive season in the top league of Polish football.

The season covers the period from 1 July 2014 to 30 June 2015.

== Players ==
=== First-team squad ===
Note: Flags indicate national team as defined under FIFA eligibility rules; some limited exceptions apply. Players may hold more than one non-FIFA nationality.

| No. | Pos. | Nation | Player |
|---|---|---|---|
| 1 | GK | POL | Dariusz Trela |
| 1 | GK | POL | Łukasz Budziłek |
| 2 | DF | POL | Rafał Janicki |
| 3 | DF | POL | Jakub Wawrzyniak |
| 4 | DF | POL | Paweł Stolarski |
| 6 | MF | POL | Sebastian Mila |
| 7 | FW | SRB | Danijel Aleksić |
| 8 | MF | POL | Daniel Łukasik |
| 9 | FW | POL | Piotr Grzelczak |
| 10 | MF | BRA | Bruno Nazário |
| 11 | MF | POL | Maciej Makuszewski |
| 13 | DF | GRE | Mavroudis Bougaidis |
| 14 | MF | POL | Piotr Wiśniewski |
| 15 | DF | POL | Adam Dźwigała |
| 16 | MF | POL | Ariel Borysiuk |
| 17 | MF | POL | Marcin Pietrowski |
| 18 | FW | POL | Kacper Łazaj |

| No. | Pos. | Nation | Player |
|---|---|---|---|
| 18 | FW | POL | Adam Buksa |
| 19 | MF | POL | Bartłomiej Pawłowski |
| 20 | FW | CRO | Antonio Čolak |
| 21 | MF | BIH | Stojan Vranješ |
| 23 | DF | POL | Grzegorz Wojtkowiak |
| 24 | GK | POL | Mateusz Bąk |
| 27 | FW | POL | Przemysław Macierzyński |
| 28 | FW | POL | Paweł Czychowski |
| 28 | GK | POL | Bartosz Kaniecki |
| 29 | FW | AUT | Kevin Friesenbichler |
| 31 | DF | POL | Przemysław Kamiński |
| 32 | MF | POL | Mateusz Możdżeń |
| 33 | DF | SRB | Nikola Leković |
| 35 | DF | BRA | Gerson |
| 40 | GK | POL | Kacper Rosa |
| 77 | GK | POL | Damian Podleśny |
| 95 | FW | RUS | Zaur Sadayev |

=== Transfers ===
==== Players In ====
| No. | Pos. | Player | From | Type | Window | Fee | Date | Source |
|---|---|---|---|---|---|---|---|---|
| 8 | MF | Daniel Łukasik | Legia Warsaw | Transfer | Summer | €800k | 1 July 2014 | |
| 19 | MF | Bartłomiej Pawłowski | Widzew Łódź | Transfer | Summer | €600k | 1 July 2014 | |
| 11 | MF | Maciej Makuszewski | FC Akhmat Grozny | Transfer | Summer | €300k | 1 July 2014 | |
| 15 | DF | Adam Dźwigała | Jagiellonia Białystok | Transfer | Summer | €250k | 1 July 2014 | |
| 77 | GK | Damian Podleśny | GKS Bełchatów | Transfer | Summer | €125k | 1 July 2014 | |
| 18 | FW | Adam Buksa | Novara Calcio | Transfer | Summer | Free | 1 July 2014 | |
| 12 | GK | Dariusz Trela | Piast Gliwice | Transfer | Summer | Free | 1 July 2014 | |
| 16 | MF | Ariel Borysiuk | 1. FC Kaiserslautern | Loan | Summer | €100k | 1 July 2014 | |
| 6 | DF | Tiago Valente | F.C. Paços de Ferreira | Transfer | Summer | Free | 2 July 2014 | |
| 32 | MF | Mateusz Możdżeń | Lech Poznań | Transfer | Summer | Free | 11 July 2014 | |
| 20 | FW | Antonio Čolak | 1. FC Nürnberg | Loan | Summer | Free | 20 August 2014 | |
| 29 | FW | Kevin Friesenbichler | S.L. Benfica B | Loan | Summer | Free | 25 August 2014 | |
| 10 | MF | Bruno Nazário | TSG 1899 Hoffenheim | Loan | Summer | Free | 28 August 2014 | |
| 3 | DF | Jakub Wawrzyniak | FC Amkar Perm | Transfer | Winter | Free | 5 January 2014 | |
| 23 | DF | Grzegorz Wojtkowiak | TSV 1860 Munich | Transfer | Winter | Free | 9 January 2015 | |
| 6 | MF | Sebastian Mila | Śląsk Wrocław | Transfer | Winter | €370k | 22 January 2015 | |
| 35 | DF | Gerson | Kapfenberger SV | Transfer | Winter | €250k | 6 February 2015 | |
| 1 | GK | Łukasz Budziłek | Legia Warsaw | Transfer | Winter | €100k | 6 February 2015 | |

==== Players Out ====
| No. | Pos. | Player | To | Type | Window | Fee | Date | Source |
|---|---|---|---|---|---|---|---|---|
| 6 | DF | Jarosław Bieniuk | Retired | - | - | - | 30 June 2014 | - |
| 27 | DF | Paweł Dawidowicz | S.L. Benfica B | Transfer | Summer | €2.5mil | 1 July 2014 | |
| 20 | FW | Paweł Buzała | Górnik Łęczna | Transfer | Summer | Free | 1 July 2014 | |
| 32 | DF | Adam Pazio | Podbeskidzie | Transfer | Summer | Free | 1 July 2014 | |
| 7 | DF | Sebastian Madera | Jagiellonia Białystok | Transfer | Summer | Free | 1 July 2014 | |
| 20 | DF | Christopher Oualembo | Académica de Coimbra | Transfer | Summer | Free | 1 July 2014 | |
| 8 | FW | Patryk Tuszyński | Jagiellonia Białystok | Transfer | Summer | Free | 1 July 2014 | |
| 5 | DF | Krzysztof Bąk | Bytovia Bytów | Transfer | Summer | Free | 3 July 2014 | |
| 30 | MF | Maciej Kostrzewa | Wisła Płock | Transfer | Summer | Free | 6 July 2014 | |
| 11 | MF | Łukasz Kacprzycki | Wisła Płock | Transfer | Summer | Free | 22 July 2014 | |
| 13 | MF | Wojciech Zyska | Wisła Płock | Loan | Summer | Free | 31 July 2014 | |
| 10 | MF | Przemysław Frankowski | Jagiellonia Białystok | Transfer | Summer | €75k | 1 August 2014 | |
| 15 | FW | Adam Duda | Widzew Łódź | Transfer | Summer | Free | 5 August 2014 | |
| 26 | DF | Deleu | Cracovia | Transfer | Summer | Free | 5 August 2014 | |
| 4 | DF | Paweł Stolarski | Zagłębie Lubin | Loan | Summer | Free | 25 August 2014 | |
| 12 | GK | Bartosz Kaniecki | Wisła Płock | Transfer | Summer | Free | 5 September 2014 | |
| 6 | DF | Tiago Valente | F.C. Penafiel | Loan | Winter | Free | 15 January 2015 | |
| 12 | GK | Dariusz Trela | GKS Bełchatów | Loan | Winter | Free | 2 February 2015 | |
| 11 | MF | Bartłomiej Pawłowski | Zawisza Bydgoszcz | Loan | Winter | Free | 11 February 2015 | |
| 77 | GK | Damian Podleśny | Chojniczanka | Loan | Winter | Free | 2 March 2015 | |

== Friendlies ==
=== Summer ===
| 2 July 2014 | Lech Poznań | 3–0 | Lechia Gdańsk | Grodzisk Wielkopolski |
| 10:00 BST | Darko Jevtić 30'; Tomasz Kędziora 57'; Vojo Ubiparip 81' | | | Stadium: Arena Lublin |

| 5 July 2014 | Górnik Zabrze | 1–3 | Lechia Gdańsk | Wronki |
| 16:00 BST | Rafał Janicki 70 (OG)' | | Stojan Vranješ 19' (pen.); Maciej Makuszewski 30'; Seweryn Gancarczyk 60 (OG)' | Stadium: Stadion Amica |

| 9 July 2014 | Lechia Gdańsk | 1–2 | APOEL FC | Chojnice |
| 16:00 BST | Danijel Aleksić 80' | | Constantinos Charalambidis 8'; Cillian Sheridan 53' | Stadium: Stadion Miejski Chojniczanka |

| 12 July 2014 | Lechia Gdańsk | 4–0 | Panathinaikos | Gdańsk |
| 16:00 BST | Bartłomiej Pawłowski 67'; Rafał Janicki 73'; Stojan Vranješ 77'; Maciej Makuszewski 79' | | | Stadium: MOSiR Stadium |

=== Winter ===
| 27 January 2015 | FC Dnipro | 1–2 | Lechia Gdańsk | Los Barrios |
| 15:00 BST | Douglas 25' | | Piotr Grzelczak 37'; Antonio Čolak 56' | Stadium: San Rafael |

| 2 February 2016 | UD Los Barrios | 0–13 | Lechia Gdańsk | Los Barrios |
| 18:00 BST | | | Kevin Friesenbichler 5', 22'; Bruno Nazário 15'; Marcin Pietrowski 25'; Antonio Čolak 47', 51', 60', 70'; Ariel Borysiuk 48', 57'; Stojan Vranješ 72'; Sebastian Mila 76' (pen.); Piotr Grzelczak 79' | Stadium: San Rafael |

| 6 February 2015 | Lechia Gdańsk | 2–1 | Bytovia Bytów | Gdańsk |
| 15:00 BST | Kevin Friesenbichler 13' (pen.); Mateusz Możdżeń 57' | | Łukasz Wróbel 75' | Stadium: MOSiR Stadium |

== Regular season ==
=== Fixtures for the 2014–15 Ekstraklasa season ===
| 19 July 2014 1 | Jagiellonia Białystok | 2–2 | Lechia Gdańsk | Białystok |
| 17:00 BST | Patryk Tuszyński 6', 29' | | Piotr Wiśniewski 45'; Marek Wasiluk 69 (OG)' | Stadium: Białystok City Stadium; Attendance: 5,782 |

| 25 July 2014 2 | Lechia Gdańsk | 1–0 | Podbeskidzie Bielsko-Biała | Gdańsk |
| 19:30 BST | Maciej Makuszewski 29' | | | Stadium: Stadion Energa Gdańsk; Attendance: 14,641 |

| 1 August 2014 3 | Lechia Gdańsk | 1–3 | Pogoń Szczecin | Piast |
| 19:30 BST | Rubén Jurado 22' | | Piotr Wiśniewski 20', 52'; Stojan Vranješ 65' (pen.) | Stadium: Stadion Piast; Attendance: 4,458 |

| 10 August 2014 4 | Lechia Gdańsk | 1–2 | Lech Poznań | Gdańsk |
| 14:30 BST | Stojan Vranješ 36' (pen.) | | Łukasz Teodorczyk 80', 84' | Stadium: Stadion Energa Gdańsk; Attendance: 25,529 |

| 17 August 2014 5 | Wisła Kraków | 3–1 | Lechia Gdańsk | Kraków |
| 17:00 BST | Maciej Sadlok 51'; Semir Štilić 57', 90' | | Stojan Vranješ 26' (pen.) | Stadium: Stadion Miejski; Attendance: 6,016 |

| 22 August 2014 6 | Zawisza Bydgoszcz | 0–2 | Lechia Gdańsk | Bydgoszcz |
| 17:00 GMT | | | Antonio Čolak 53'; Maciej Makuszewski 85' | Stadium: Zdzisław Krzyszkowiak Stadium; Attendance: 1,543 |

| 31 August 2014 7 | Lechia Gdańsk | 3–3 | Ruch Chorzów | Gdańsk |
| 14:30 BST | Stojan Vranješ 49'; Antonio Čolak 80'; Kevin Friesenbichler 89' | | Filip Starzyński 26'; Jakub Kowalski 59'; Eduards Višņakovs 82' | Stadium: Stadion Energa Gdańsk; Attendance: 14,293 |

| 14 September 2014 8 | GKS Bełchatów | 1–1 | Lechia Gdańsk | Bełchatów |
| 17:00 GMT | Bartosz Ślusarski 37' | | Piotr Grzelczak 90+3' | Stadium: Stadion GKS; Attendance: 3,314 |

| 19 September 2014 9 | Lechia Gdańsk | 0–1 | Pogoń Szczecin | Gdańsk |
| 19:30 BST | | | Marcin Robak 38' | Stadium: Stadion Energa Gdańsk; Attendance: 13,141 |

| 28 September 2014 10 | Górnik Zabrze | 2–2 | Lechia Gdańsk | Zabrze |
| 14:30 BST | Mariusz Magiera 30'; Wojciech Łuczak 79' | | Antonio Čolak 48', 64' | Stadium: Ernest Pohl Stadium; Attendance: 3,000 |

| 4 October 2014 11 | Lechia Gdańsk | 1–0 | Cracovia | Gdańsk |
| 17:00 BST | Maciej Makuszewski 5' | | | Stadium: Stadion Energa Gdańsk; Attendance: 12,510 |

| 17 October 2014 12 | Legia Warsaw | 1–0 | Lechia Gdańsk | Warsaw |
| 19:30 GMT | Orlando Sá 88' | | | Stadium: Polish Army Stadium; Attendance: 18,171 |

| 25 October 2014 13 | Lechia Gdańsk | 1–4 | Śląsk Wrocław | Gdańsk |
| 14:30 BST | Kevin Friesenbichler 80' | | Tiago Valente 6 (OG)'; Flávio Paixão 11' (pen.) | Stadium: Stadion Energa Gdańsk; Attendance: 13,966 |

| 31 October 2014 14 | Górnik Łęczna | 1–1 | Lechia Gdańsk | Łęczna |
| 17:00 BST | Patrik Mráz 24' | | Antonio Čolak 51' | Stadium: Stadion Górnika Łęczna; Attendance: 4,033 |

| 8 November 2014 15 | Lechia Gdańsk | 1–2 | Korona Kielce | Gdańsk |
| 14:30 BST | Antonio Čolak 90+3' | | Olivier Kapo 25'; Vlastimir Jovanović 43' | Stadium: Stadion Energa Gdańsk; Attendance: 8,991 |

| 23 November 2014 16 | Lechia Gdańsk | 1–1 | Jagiellonia Białystok | Gdańsk |
| 14:30 GMT | Sebastian Madera 5 (OG)' | | Łukasz Tymiński 37' | Stadium: Stadion Energa Gdańsk; Attendance: 8,805 |

| 29 November 2014 17 | Podbeskidzie Bielsko-Biała | 1–0 | Lechia Gdańsk | Bielsko-Biała |
| 14:30 GMT | Pavol Staňo 43' | | | Stadium: Stadion Miejski; Attendance: 3,250 |

| 7 December 2014 18 | Lechia Gdańsk | 3–1 | Piast Gliwice | Gdańsk |
| 14:30 GMT | Piotr Wiśniewski 28', 35', 51' | | Kamil Wilczek 75' | Stadium: Stadion Energa Gdańsk; Attendance: 7,619 |

| 13 December 2014 19 | Lech Poznań | 1–0 | Lechia Gdańsk | Poznań |
| 17:00 GMT | Dariusz Formella 32' | | | Stadium: Stadion Miejski; Attendance: 16,029 |

| 13 February 2015 20 | Lechia Gdańsk | 1–0 | Wisła Kraków | Gdańsk |
| 19:30 GMT | Piotr Grzelczak 55' | | | Stadium: Stadion Energa Gdańsk; Attendance: 14,363 |

| 21 February 2015 21 | Lechia Gdańsk | 0–0 | Zawisza Bydgoszcz | Gdańsk |
| 14:30 GMT | | | | Stadium: Stadion Energa Gdańsk; Attendance: 15,264 |

| 27 February 2015 22 | Ruch Chorzów | 1–1 | Lechia Gdańsk | Chorzów |
| 17:00 GMT | Filip Starzyński 57' (pen.) | | Kevin Friesenbichler 45+2' (pen.) | Stadium: Stadion Miejski; Attendance: 5,568 |

| 7 March 2015 23 | Lechia Gdańsk | 1–0 | GKS Bełchatów | Gdańsk |
| 17:00 GMT | Antonio Čolak 80' | | | Stadium: Stadion Energa Gdańsk; Attendance: 9,851 |

| 13 March 2015 24 | Pogoń Szczecin | 0–1 | Lechia Gdańsk | Szczecin |
| 19:30 GMT | | | Sebastian Mila 19' | Stadium: Stadion Florian Krygier; Attendance: 5,284 |

| 21 March 2015 25 | Lechia Gdańsk | 1–0 | Górnik Zabrze | Gdańsk |
| 19:30 GMT | Antonio Čolak 10' | | | Stadium: Stadion Energa Gdańsk; Attendance: 12,493 |

| 4 April 2015 26 | Cracovia | 3–2 | Lechia Gdańsk | Kraków |
| 12:00 GMT | Marcin Budziński 21'; Deniss Rakels 44' (pen.); Piotr Polczak 49' | | Piotr Grzelczak 40'; Stojan Vranješ 47' | Stadium: Marshal Józef Piłsudski Stadium; Attendance: 6,143 |

| 11 April 2015 27 | Lechia Gdańsk | 1–0 | Legia Warsaw | Gdańsk |
| 14:30 GMT | Maciej Makuszewski 86' | | | Stadium: Stadion Energa Gdańsk; Attendance: 36,500 |

| 18 April 2015 28 | Śląsk Wrocław | 3–0 | Lechia Gdańsk | Wrocław |
| 14:30 GMT | Mateusz Machaj 21' (pen.); Piotr Celeban 54'; Marco Paixão 86' | | | Stadium: Stadion Miejski; Attendance: 11,651 |

| 26 April 2015 29 | Lechia Gdańsk | 2–0 | Górnik Łęczna | Gdańsk |
| 14:30 GMT | Stojan Vranješ 38'; Bruno Nazário 51' | | | Stadium: Stadion Energa Gdańsk; Attendance: 23,990 |

| 29 April 2015 30 | Korona Kielce | 3–2 | Lechia Gdańsk | Kielce |
| 19:30 GMT | Olivier Kapo 7'; Luís Carlos Lima 13'; Rafael Porcellis 71' | | Kevin Friesenbichler 14'; Maciej Makuszewski 18' | Stadium: Kielce City Stadium; Attendance: 5,769 |

==== League table ====
| Pos | Team | Pld | W | D | L | GF | GA | GD | Pts | Qualification or relegation |
|---|---|---|---|---|---|---|---|---|---|---|
| 1 | Legia Warsaw | 30 | 17 | 5 | 8 | 57 | 30 | +27 | 56 | Qualification to Championship round |
| 2 | Lech Poznań | 30 | 14 | 12 | 4 | 52 | 27 | +25 | 54 | Qualification to Championship round |
| 3 | Jagiellonia Białystok | 30 | 14 | 7 | 9 | 43 | 35 | +8 | 49 | Qualification to Championship round |
| 4 | Śląsk Wrocław | 30 | 12 | 10 | 8 | 43 | 36 | +7 | 46 | Qualification to Championship round |
| 5 | Wisła Kraków | 30 | 11 | 10 | 9 | 47 | 39 | +8 | 43 (Note: Wisła Kraków ahead on head-to-head record; Górnik Zabrze – Wisła Kraków 0–5, Wisła Kraków – Górnik Zabrze 1–1) | Qualification to Championship round |
| 6 | Górnik Zabrze | 30 | 11 | 10 | 9 | 43 | 43 | 0 | 43 | Qualification to Championship round |
| 7 | Pogoń Szczecin | 30 | 11 | 8 | 11 | 40 | 38 | +2 | 41 (Note: Tied on head-to-head record, Pogoń Szczecin ahead on goal difference; Lechia Gdańsk – Pogoń Szczecin 0–1, Pogoń Szczecin – Lechia Gdańsk 0–1) | Qualification to Championship round |
| 8 | Lechia Gdańsk | 30 | 11 | 8 | 11 | 36 | 37 | −1 | 41 | Qualification to Championship round |
| 9 | Korona Kielce | 30 | 10 | 9 | 11 | 34 | 42 | −8 | 39 (Note: Head-to-head record; Korona Kielce 10 pts, Piast Gliwice 6 pts, Podbeskidzie Bielsko-Biała 1 pt) | Qualification to the Relegation round |
| 10 | Piast Gliwice | 30 | 11 | 6 | 13 | 38 | 43 | −5 | 39 | Qualification to the Relegation round |
| 11 | Podbeskidzie Bielsko-Biała | 30 | 10 | 9 | 11 | 40 | 48 | −8 | 39 | Qualification to the Relegation round |
| 12 | Cracovia | 30 | 10 | 7 | 13 | 35 | 41 | −6 | 37 | Qualification to the Relegation round |
| 13 | Górnik Łęczna | 30 | 8 | 10 | 12 | 31 | 37 | −6 | 34 | Qualification to the Relegation round |
| 14 | Ruch Chorzów | 30 | 8 | 9 | 13 | 33 | 38 | −5 | 33 | Qualification to the Relegation round |
| 15 | GKS Bełchatów | 30 | 8 | 7 | 15 | 24 | 42 | −18 | 31 | Qualification to the Relegation round |
| 16 | Zawisza Bydgoszcz | 30 | 8 | 5 | 17 | 32 | 52 | −20 | 29 | Qualification to the Relegation round |

Updated to match(es) played on 29 April 2015. Source: 90minut.pl
Rules for classification: 1) points; 2) head-to-head points; 3) head-to-head goal difference; 4) head-to-head goals scored; 5) goal difference; 6) number of goals scored; 7) Fair play table; head-to-head record is used only after all the matches between the teams in question have been played.

== Championship Group ==
| 9 May 2015 31 | Pogoń Szczecin | 1–3 | Lechia Gdańsk | Szczecin |
| 17:00 GMT | Łukasz Zwoliński 16' | | Antonio Čolak 62'; Stojan Vranješ 65' (pen.); Gerson 73' | Stadium: Stadion Florian Krygier; Attendance: 6,458 |

| 15 May 2015 32 | Lechia Gdańsk | 2–2 | Wisła Kraków | Gdańsk |
| 19:30 GMT | Maciej Makuszewski 36'; Kevin Friesenbichler 73' | | Rafał Boguski 60'; Jean Barrientos 69' | Stadium: Stadion Energa Gdańsk; Attendance: 18,032 |

| 20 May 2015 33 | Górnik Zabrze | 0–1 | Lechia Gdańsk | Zabrze |
| 17:00 GMT | | | Sebastian Mila 79' | Stadium: Ernest Pohl Stadium; Attendance: 3,000 |

| 24 May 2015 34 | Lechia Gdańsk | 1–2 | Lech Poznań | Gdańsk |
| 17:00 GMT | Stojan Vranješ 90+1' (pen.) | | Kasper Hämäläinen 29'; Szymon Pawłowski 73' | Stadium: Stadion Energa Gdańsk; Attendance: 23,921 |

| 30 May 2015 35 | Śląsk Wrocław | 1–0 | Lechia Gdańsk | Wrocław |
| 19:30 GMT | Flávio Paixão 77' | | | Stadium: Stadion Miejski; Attendance: 6,986 |

| 3 June 2015 36 | Lechia Gdańsk | 0–0 | Legia Warsaw | Gdańsk |
| 19:30 GMT | | | | Stadium: Stadion Energa Gdańsk; Attendance: 24,678 |

| 7 June 2015 37 | Jagiellonia Białystok | 4–2 | Lechia Gdańsk | Białystok |
| 17:00 GMT | Patryk Tuszyński 79' (pen.); Filip Modelski 89'; Taras Romanchuk 90+2'; Maciej Gajos 90+4' (pen.) | | Nikola Leković 42'; Antonio Čolak 57' | Stadium: Białystok City Stadium; Attendance: 17,748 |

=== League table ===
| Pos | Team | Pld | W | D | L | GF | GA | GD | Pts | Qualification |
|---|---|---|---|---|---|---|---|---|---|---|
| 1 | Lech Poznań (C) | 37 | 19 | 13 | 5 | 67 | 33 | +34 | 43 | Qualification to Champions League second qualifying round |
| 2 | Legia Warsaw | 37 | 21 | 7 | 9 | 64 | 33 | +31 | 42 | Qualification to Europa League second qualifying round (Note: Legia Warsaw qualifies for Europa League second qualifying round as winners of the 2014–15 Polish Cup and the spot for the runners-up (Europa League first qualifying round) is passed to the fourth placed team.) |
| 3 | Jagiellonia Białystok | 37 | 19 | 8 | 10 | 59 | 44 | +15 | 41 | Qualification to Europa League first qualifying round |
| 4 | Śląsk Wrocław | 37 | 15 | 13 | 9 | 50 | 43 | +7 | 35 | Qualification to Europa League first qualifying round |
| 5 | Lechia Gdańsk | 37 | 13 | 10 | 14 | 45 | 47 | −2 | 29 | |
| 6 | Wisła Kraków | 37 | 12 | 13 | 12 | 56 | 48 | +8 | 28 | |
| 7 | Górnik Zabrze | 37 | 12 | 11 | 14 | 50 | 60 | −10 | 26 | |
| 8 | Pogoń Szczecin | 37 | 11 | 9 | 17 | 45 | 52 | −7 | 22 | |

Updated to match(es) played on 3 June 2015. Source: Ekstraklasa
Rules for classification: 1) points; 2) points in regular season; 3) head-to-head points in regular season; 4) head-to-head goal difference in regular season; 5) head-to-head away goals scored in regular season (if only two teams); 6) head-to-head goals scored in regular season (if more than two teams); 7) goal difference; 8) number of goals scored; 9) Fair Play table.
(C) Champions

== Polish Cup ==
| 24 September 2014 Round of 32 | Stal Stalowa Wola | 2–1 | Lechia Gdańsk | Stalowa Wola |
| 15:00 GMT | Kałat 38'; Płonka 52' | | Piotr Grzelczak 76' | Stadium: Stadion MOSiR; Attendance: 2,500 |

== Stats ==
| | | | League | | Cup | | Total | |
| No. | Pos. | Player | Apps | Goals | Apps | Goals | Apps | Goals |
|---|---|---|---|---|---|---|---|---|
| 1 | GK | Łukasz Budziłek | 7 | - | - | - | 7 | - |
| 1 | GK | Dariusz Trela | 9 | - | - | - | 9 | - |
| 2 | DF | Rafał Janicki | 34 | - | 1 | - | 35 | - |
| 3 | DF | Jakub Wawrzyniak | 11 | - | - | - | 11 | - |
| 4 | DF | Damian Garbacik | 2 | - | - | - | 2 | - |
| 5 | DF | Rudinilson | 4 | - | - | - | 4 | - |
| 6 | MF | Sebastian Mila | 16 | 2 | - | - | 16 | 2 |
| 6 | DF | Tiago Valente | 12 | - | - | - | 12 | - |
| 7 | MF | Donatas Kazlauskas | 1 | - | - | - | 1 | - |
| 7 | FW | Danijel Aleksić | 3 | - | 1 | - | 4 | - |
| 8 | MF | Daniel Łukasik | 27 | - | - | - | 27 | - |
| 9 | FW | Piotr Grzelczak | 29 | 3 | 1 | 1 | 30 | 4 |
| 10 | MF | Bruno Nazário | 27 | 1 | - | - | 27 | 1 |
| 11 | MF | Maciej Makuszewski | 34 | 6 | 1 | - | 35 | 6 |
| 13 | DF | Mavroudis Bougaidis | 12 | - | - | - | 12 | - |
| 14 | MF | Piotr Wiśniewski | 23 | 6 | 1 | - | 24 | 6 |
| 15 | DF | Adam Dźwigała | 10 | - | 1 | - | 11 | - |
| 16 | MF | Ariel Borysiuk | 34 | - | 1 | - | 35 | - |
| 17 | MF | Marcin Pietrowski | 19 | - | 1 | - | 20 | - |
| 18 | FW | Kacper Łazaj | 1 | - | - | - | 1 | - |
| 18 | FW | Adam Buksa | 8 | - | - | - | 8 | - |
| 19 | MF | Bartłomiej Pawłowski | 12 | - | 1 | - | 13 | - |
| 20 | FW | Antonio Čolak | 30 | 10 | 1 | - | 31 | 10 |
| 21 | MF | Stojan Vranješ | 33 | 8 | 1 | - | 34 | 8 |
| 22 | MF | Filip Malbašić | 3 | - | - | - | 3 | - |
| 23 | DF | Grzegorz Wojtkowiak | 16 | - | - | - | 16 | - |
| 24 | GK | Mateusz Bąk | 21 | - | 1 | - | 22 | - |
| 27 | FW | Przemysław Macierzyński | 1 | - | - | - | 1 | - |
| 28 | FW | Paweł Czychowski | 1 | - | - | - | 1 | - |
| 29 | FW | Kevin Friesenbichler | 16 | 5 | - | - | 16 | 5 |
| 32 | MF | Mateusz Możdżeń | 24 | - | 1 | - | 25 | - |
| 33 | DF | Nikola Leković | 18 | - | 1 | - | 19 | 1 |
| 35 | DF | Gerson | 14 | 1 | - | - | 14 | 1 |
| 95 | FW | Zaur Sadayev | 4 | - | - | - | 4 | - |

=== Goalscorers ===
| Rank | Player | Goals |
|---|---|---|
| 1 | Antonio Čolak | 10 |
| 2 | Stojan Vranješ | 8 |
| 3 | Maciej Makuszewski | 6 |
| 3 | Piotr Wiśniewski | 6 |
| 5 | Kevin Friesenbichler | 5 |
| 6 | Piotr Grzelczak | 4 |
| 7 | Sebastian Mila | 2 |
| 8 | Bruno Nazário | 1 |
| 8 | Nikola Leković | 1 |
| 8 | Gerson | 1 |
