= Marcin Staniszewski =

Polish footballer

Personal information
- Full name: Marcin Staniszewski
- Date of birth: 14 January 1997 (age 29)
- Place of birth: Koszalin, Poland
- Height: 1.88 m (6 ft 2 in)
- Position: Goalkeeper

Team information
- Current team: Wikęd Luzino
- Number: 12

Youth career
- –2012: UKS SMS Łódź

Senior career*
Years	Team	Apps	(Gls)
2012–2015	UKS SMS Łódź	0	(0)
2013	→ Tur Turek (loan)	10	(0)
2013–2014	→ Zawisza Rzgów (loan)	14	(0)
2014–2015	→ Puszcza Niepołomice (loan)	10	(0)
2015–2018	Puszcza Niepołomice	80	(0)
2018–2020	Arka Gdynia	3	(0)
2020–2021	Bytovia Bytów	16	(0)
2021–2022	Sokół Ostróda	12	(0)
2022–2023	FSV Union Fürstenwalde	51	(0)
2023–2024	Stolem Gniewino	11	(0)
2024–	Wikęd Luzino	55	(0)

International career
2017	Poland U20	2	(0)
- * Club domestic league appearances and goals as of 17:48, 5 June 2026 (UTC)

Marcin Staniszewski (born 14 January 1997) is a Polish professional footballer who plays as a goalkeeper for III liga club Wikęd Luzino.

== Club career ==
On 19 August 2020, he signed with Bytovia Bytów.

== Honours ==
Wikęd Luzino

- IV liga Pomerania: 2024–25
