= Nikola Leković =

Serbian footballer

Personal information
- Date of birth: 19 December 1989 (age 36)
- Place of birth: Belgrade, SFR Yugoslavia
- Height: 1.76 m (5 ft 9 in)
- Position: Left-back

Youth career
- 1998–2007: Partizan
- 2007–2008: Bežanija

Senior career*
Years	Team	Apps	(Gls)
2008–2010	Bežanija	38	(8)
2010–2013	Rad	81	(2)
2013	Vojvodina	11	(0)
2014–2016	Lechia Gdańsk	35	(1)
2015–2016	→ Partizan (loan)	5	(0)
2016	Napredak Kruševac	11	(0)
2017	Dinamo Minsk	23	(1)
2018	Kerkyra	9	(0)
2018	Karabükspor	0	(0)
2018–2019	Mladost Lučani	42	(0)
2020	Tuzla City	3	(0)
2020	Napredak Kruševac	18	(0)
2021–2026	Mladost Lučani	129	(2)

International career
2010	Serbia U21	2	(0)
- * Club domestic league appearances and goals as of 13 June 2026

Nikola Leković (Serbian Cyrillic: Никола Лековић; born 19 December 1989) is a Serbian professional footballer who plays as a left-back.

== Club career ==
Born in Belgrade, Leković started out at Partizan as a trainee in 1998. He spent nine years in the club's youth setup, before switching to Bežanija in 2007. After initially playing for their youth team, Leković was promoted to the senior squad in May 2008, making his Serbian SuperLiga debut in a 0–1 home loss to Hajduk Kula. He spent two more seasons at the club, as the side competed in the Serbian First League, before securing a transfer to Rad in the summer of 2010. Over the following three seasons at Banjica, Leković made 88 appearances in all competitions.

In July 2013, Leković was transferred to Vojvodina on a two-year contract plus a one-year option. He scored a goal in the 90th minute of a 1–2 away loss against Moldovan champions Sheriff Tiraspol in the 2013–14 UEFA Europa League play-off round, as Vojvodina were eliminated. In February 2014, Leković moved abroad and signed with Polish club Lechia Gdańsk.

On 31 August 2015, Leković joined his parent club Partizan on a season-long loan from Lechia Gdańsk. He was given the number 3 shirt, previously worn by Vladimir Volkov. After becoming a free agent, Leković agreed terms with Napredak Kruševac in July 2016.

In January 2017, Leković moved abroad for the second time and signed with Belarusian club Dinamo Minsk. After Dinamo, he also played for Kerkyra and Karabükspor during 2018, and for Mladost Lučani from 2018 to 2019.

On 30 December 2019, Leković signed a two-and-a-half-year contract with Bosnian Premier League club Tuzla City. He made his official debut for Tuzla City in a 6–2 league loss against Sarajevo on 22 February 2020. On 24 June 2020, Leković decided to terminate his contract and leave Tuzla City.

== International career ==
Leković represented Serbia at under-21 level, making two appearances in the team's unsuccessful qualifiers for the 2011 UEFA Under-21 Championship.

== Career statistics ==
=== Club ===
As of match played 8 March 2020.

Appearances and goals by club, season and competition
Club	Season	League			Cup		Europe		Total	
Club	Season	Division	Apps	Goals	Apps	Goals	Apps	Goals	Apps	Goals
Bežanija	2007–08	Serbian SuperLiga	2	0	0	0	0	0	2	0
Bežanija	2008–09	Serbian First League	5	0	0	0	—		5	0
Bežanija	2009–10	Serbian First League	31	8	0	0	—		31	8
Bežanija	Total		38	8	0	0	0	0	38	8
Rad	2010–11	Serbian SuperLiga	27	1	1	0	—		28	1
Rad	2011–12	Serbian SuperLiga	29	1	0	0	4	0	33	1
Rad	2012–13	Serbian SuperLiga	25	0	2	0	—		27	0
Rad	Total		81	2	3	0	4	0	88	2
Vojvodina	2013–14	Serbian SuperLiga	11	0	2	0	4	1	17	1
Lechia Gdańsk	2013–14	Ekstraklasa	15	0	2	0	—		17	0
Lechia Gdańsk	2014–15	Ekstraklasa	18	1	1	0	—		19	1
Lechia Gdańsk	2015–16	Ekstraklasa	2	0	0	0	—		2	0
Lechia Gdańsk	Total		35	1	3	0	—		38	1
Partizan (loan)	2015–16	Serbian SuperLiga	5	0	1	0	2	0	8	0
Napredak Kruševac	2016–17	Serbian SuperLiga	11	0	0	0	—		11	0
Dinamo Minsk	2017	Belarusian Premier League	23	1	1	0	6	0	30	1
Kerkyra	2017–18	Super League Greece	9	0	—		—		9	0
Karabükspor	2018–19	TFF First League	0	0	0	0	—		0	0
Mladost Lučani	2018–19	Serbian SuperLiga	23	0	3	0	—		26	0
Mladost Lučani	2019–20	Serbian SuperLiga	19	0	0	0	—		19	0
Mladost Lučani	Total		42	0	3	0	—		45	0
Tuzla City	2019–20	Bosnian Premier League	3	0	1	0	—		4	0
Career total			258	12	14	0	16	1	288	13

== Honours ==
Partizan

- Serbian Cup: 2015–16
