= Alan Fialho =

Brazilian-Polish footballer (born 1993)

Personal information
- Full name: Alan Gelhorn Fialho
- Date of birth: 1 February 1993 (age 33)
- Place of birth: Rio de Janeiro, Brazil
- Height: 1.83 m (6 ft 0 in)
- Position: Centre back

Youth career
- 2010–2011: Grêmio Barueri
- 2011–2013: Osasco Audax

Senior career*
Years	Team	Apps	(Gls)
2012–2013	Osasco Audax	0	(0)
2013–2018	Fluminense	0	(0)
2013–2014	→ Legia Warsaw II (loan)	24	(1)
2014	→ Arka Gdynia (loan)	12	(2)
2015	→ Linense (loan)	0	(0)
2015–2016	→ Arka Gdynia (loan)	18	(2)
2016–2017	→ STK Samorin (loan)	4	(0)
2018	→ Volta Redonda (loan)	0	(0)
- * Club domestic league appearances and goals

Alan Gelhorn Fialho (born 1 February 1993) is a Brazilian-Polish former professional footballer who played as a central defender.

== Early life ==
Fialho was born in Rio de Janeiro.

== Playing career ==
=== Club ===
Fialho has had three stints in Poland, one with Legia Warsaw and two separate spells with Arka Gdynia. In 2016, Fialho was linked to a move to FC Ashdod in Israel as he qualifies for Israeli citizenship.

=== International ===
Fialho also holds a Polish passport, and received a call-up to the Poland under-20 team in 2013, which was rescinded shortly after due to Fialho not speaking Polish.

== Honours ==
Arka Gdynia

- I liga: 2015–16
