= Wojciech Lisowski =

Polish footballer

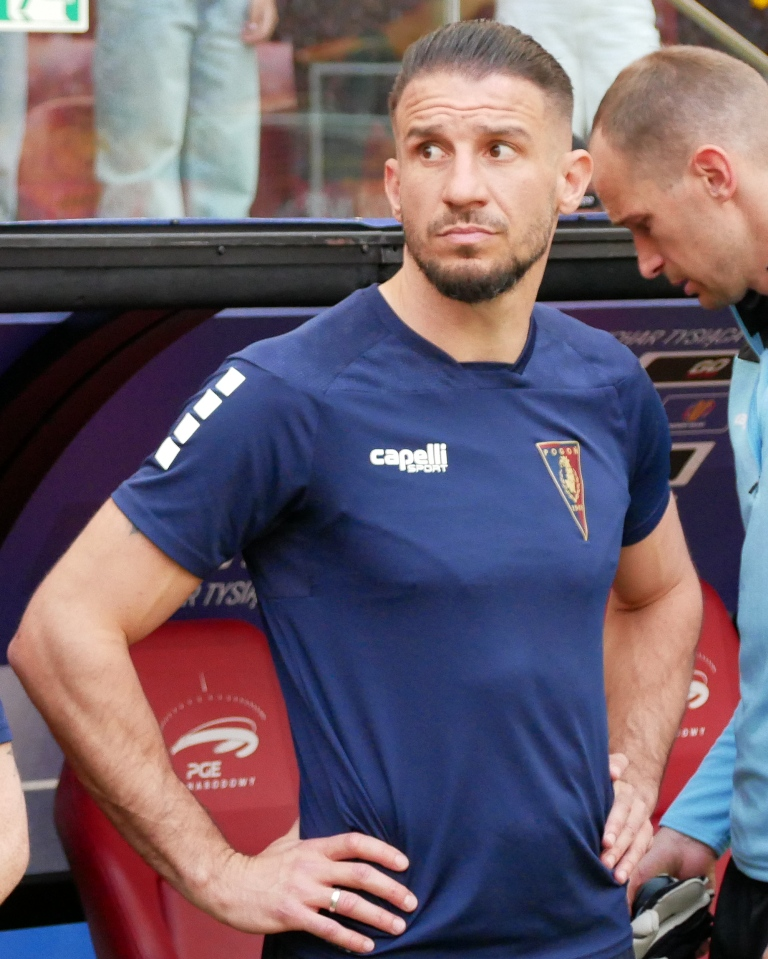
- Lisowski with Pogoń Szczecin in 2025

Personal information
- Full name: Wojciech Lisowski
- Date of birth: 10 February 1992 (age 34)
- Place of birth: Stargard, Poland
- Height: 1.86 m (6 ft 1 in)
- Position: Centre-back

Team information
- Current team: Pogoń Szczecin II
- Number: 5

Youth career
- –2005: Piast Chociwel
- 2005–2008: Stal Szczecin
- 2008–2012: Legia Warsaw

Senior career*
Years	Team	Apps	(Gls)
2009–2011	Legia Warsaw (ME)	39	(5)
2011–2013	→ Piast Gliwice (loan)	16	(2)
2013–2014	Pogoń Szczecin	8	(0)
2014–2018	Chojniczanka Chojnice	119	(8)
2018–2019	GKS Katowice	29	(2)
2019–2021	Stal Mielec	15	(1)
2021–	Pogoń Szczecin II	93	(15)
2023–2025	Pogoń Szczecin	26	(0)
- * Club domestic league appearances and goals as of 09:38, 4 June 2026 (UTC)

Wojciech Lisowski (born 10 February 1992) is a Polish professional footballer who plays as a centre-back for IV liga West Pomerania club Pogoń Szczecin II.

== Honours ==
Piast Gliwice

- I liga: 2011–12

Stal Mielec

- I liga: 2019–20

Pogoń Szczecin II

- Polish Cup (West Pomerania regionals): 2021–22, 2022–23
