= Frank Adu Kwame =

Ghanaian footballer (born 1985)

Personal information
- Date of birth: 16 May 1985 (age 41)
- Place of birth: Kumasi, Ghana
- Height: 1.80 m (5 ft 11 in)
- Position: Left-back

Senior career*
| Years | Team | Apps | (Gls) |
- Norchip
- Bechem Chelsea
- Tanta
- CAPS United
| 2011–2016 | LZS Piotrówka | 45 | (13) |
| 2013 | → Piast Gliwice (loan) | 0 | (0) |
| 2013–2016 | → Podbeskidzie (loan) | 50 | (1) |
| 2013–2016 | → Podbeskidzie II (loan) | 11 | (0) |
| 2016–2017 | Wigry Suwałki | 25 | (1) |
| 2017–2019 | Miedź Legnica | 34 | (0) |
| 2018 | Miedź Legnica II | 2 | (0) |
| 2019 | Wigry Suwałki | 11 | (0) |
| 2021–2022 | Horchheim | | |
| 2022–2023 | Cosmos Koblenz | 53 | (3) |
- * Club domestic league appearances and goals as of 16 May 2024

Frank Adu Kwame (born 16 May 1985) is a Ghanaian professional footballer who plays as a defender.

== Honours ==
Miedź Legnica

- I liga: 2017–18
