= Dawid Kwiek =

Polish footballer (born 1988)

Personal information
- Date of birth: 22 January 1988 (age 38)
- Place of birth: Freiburg, West Germany
- Height: 1.77 m (5 ft 10 in)
- Position: Midfielder

Youth career
- 2002–2006: Wisła Kraków

Senior career*
Years	Team	Apps	(Gls)
2006–2007	Wisła Kraków II		
2007–2008	Wisła Kraków (MESA)	35	(3)
2009	Signal FC		
2009	Yverdon-Sport	13	(3)
2010	LKS Nieciecza	15	(1)
2011–2013	Resovia	51	(5)
2013–2015	Widzew Łódź	22	(1)
2013	Widzew Łódź II	6	(1)
2014	→ Okocimski KS (loan)	14	(1)
2015–2017	Radomiak Radom	49	(4)
2017–2019	Resovia	38	(3)
2020	KS Wiązownica	1	(0)
- * Club domestic league appearances and goals

Dawid Kwiek (born 22 January 1988) is a Polish former professional footballer who played as a midfielder.

== Career ==
Kwiek began his career at Wisła Kraków. In the 2007–08 season, he won the Młoda Ekstraklasa title with Wisła Kraków (ME) team. In 2009, he moved to Swiss 2. Liga Interregional club Signal FC Bernex-Confignon. On 14 July 2009, he joined Yverdon-Sport to play in Swiss Challenge League and left the club after a half year. After one month without a club, Kwiek joined LKS Nieciecza on 24 January 2010 on trial, before signing a contract with them on 6 February 2010. In February 2011, he joined Resovia on a one-and-a-half-year contract.

== Personal life ==
Kwiek was born in Freiburg, Germany of Polish descent and then moved with his family to Canada, before returning to Poland, the country of his parents, at 14 years of age.

== Style of play ==
Kwiek was a left-footed midfielder.

== Honours ==
Wisła Kraków (ME)

- Młoda Ekstraklasa: 2007–08

LKS Nieciecza

- II liga East: 2009–10

Resovia

- III liga, group IV: 2009–10
- Polish Cup (Subcarpathia regionals): 2017–18
- Polish Cup (Rzeszów-Dębica regionals): 2017–18

KS Wiązownica

- IV liga Subcarpathia: 2019–20
