= Adrian Bielawski =

Polish footballer (born 1996)

Personal information
- Full name: Adrian Bielawski
- Date of birth: 14 April 1996 (age 30)
- Place of birth: Gdańsk, Poland
- Height: 1.74 m (5 ft 9 in)
- Position: Right back

Team information
- Current team: Gedania Gdańsk
- Number: 2

Youth career
- –2014: Lechia Gdańsk

Senior career*
Years	Team	Apps	(Gls)
2012–2016	Lechia Gdańsk	0	(0)
2012–2013	Lechia Gdańsk II	6	(0)
2013–2016	→ Olimpia Grudziądz (loan)	34	(0)
2016–2019	Olimpia Grudziądz	31	(0)
2019	Warta Gorzów	13	(5)
2019–2020	Bytovia Bytów	28	(2)
2021–2024	Warta Gorzów	81	(5)
2024–	Gedania Gdańsk	57	(2)

International career
2012–2013	Poland U17	10	(0)
2013	Poland U18	7	(0)
- * Club domestic league appearances and goals as of 21:12, 25 June 2026 (UTC)

Adrian Bielawski (born 14 April 1996) is a Polish professional footballer who plays as a right-back for III liga club Gedania Gdańsk.

== Senior career ==
Bielawski started his career with Lechia Gdańsk, making the move up to the Lechia second team in 2012. After a good start with the Lechia's reserves, Bielawski joined Olimpia Grudziądz for the 2013–14 season. His time at Olimpia proved to be successful, and the following season he rejoined Olimpia on loan for another season. In total, Bielawski played with Olimpia for three seasons on loan, before making the move permanent in 2016. In 2018 he extended his contract with Olimpia, before leaving the club 6 months later. In total, Bielawski spent five-and-a-half seasons with Olimpia, making a total of 65 league appearances during that time.

On 6 February 2019, Bielawski joined III liga team Warta Gorzów. He spent 5 months with Warta, playing 13 games and scoring his first professional goals in football, scoring 5 in total during his spell at the club. Despite his impressive goal-scoring record from defense, Bielawski was unable to help Warta avoid relegation. He moved to II liga team Bytovia Bytów on 11 July 2019. During the pre-season Bielawski was involved in a friendly playing against the team where he started his career, Lechia Gdańsk, playing in the second half of a 7–1 defeat.

== Honours ==
Gedania Gdańsk

- IV liga Pomerania: 2025–26
