= Dariusz Trela =

Polish footballer

Personal information
- Full name: Dariusz Trela
- Date of birth: 5 December 1989 (age 36)
- Place of birth: Kraków, Poland
- Height: 1.89 m (6 ft 2 in)
- Position: Goalkeeper

Youth career
- Skawinka Skawina
- 2006–2009: Wisła Kraków

Senior career*
Years	Team	Apps	(Gls)
2009	LKS Nieciecza		
2010	IKS Olkusz		
2010–2011	Okocimski KS Brzesko	33	(0)
2011–2014	Piast Gliwice	70	(0)
2014–2016	Lechia Gdańsk	9	(0)
2015	→ GKS Bełchatów (loan)	10	(0)
2015–2016	→ Korona Kielce (loan)	19	(0)
2015	→ Korona Kielce II (loan)	2	(0)
2016–2019	Bruk-Bet Termalica Nieciecza	36	(0)
- * Club domestic league appearances and goals

Dariusz Trela (born 5 December 1989) is a Polish former professional footballer who played as a goalkeeper.

== Honours ==
Piast Gliwice

- I liga: 2011–12
