= Piotr Stawarczyk =

Polish footballer

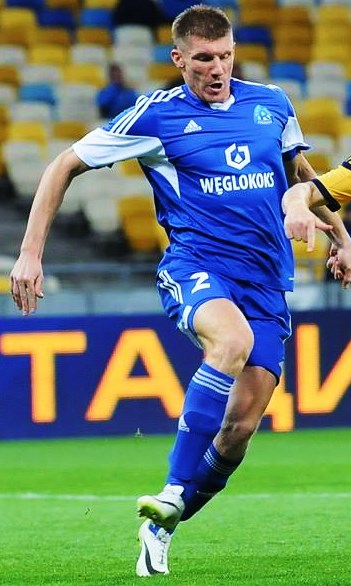
- Stawarczyk playing for Ruch Chorzów in 2014

Personal information
- Full name: Piotr Stawarczyk
- Date of birth: 29 September 1983 (age 43)
- Place of birth: Kraków, Poland
- Height: 1.93 m (6 ft 4 in)
- Position: Centre-back

Senior career*
Years	Team	Apps	(Gls)
2001–2003	Wisła Kraków II		
2003–2005	OKS Brzesko		
2006–2009	Widzew Łódź	79	(3)
2009–2015	Ruch Chorzów	147	(7)
2015–2016	Zawisza Bydgoszcz	25	(1)
2016–2020	Puszcza Niepołomice	115	(15)
2020–2021	Hutnik Kraków	50	(8)
2022	Dalin Myślenice	27	(4)
- * Club domestic league appearances and goals

Piotr Stawarczyk (born 29 September 1983) is a Polish former professional footballer who played as a centre-back.

== Club career ==
On 6 August 2020, he signed with Hutnik Kraków. He left the club by mutual consent on 23 December 2021.

== Honours ==
Widzew Łódź

- I liga: 2005–06, 2008–09
