= Dossa Júnior =

Portuguese footballer

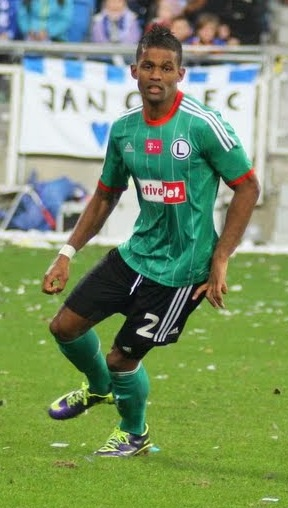
- Júnior playing for Legia Warsaw in 2013

Personal information
- Full name: Dossa Momad Omar Hassamo Júnior
- Date of birth: 28 July 1986 (age 40)
- Place of birth: Lisbon, Portugal
- Height: 1.89 m (6 ft 2 in)
- Position: Centre-back

Youth career
- 2002–2003: Imortal
- 2003–2005: Louletano

Senior career*
Years	Team	Apps	(Gls)
2005–2006	Imortal	15	(0)
2006–2007	Digenis Akritas	11	(0)
2007–2009	AEP	54	(3)
2009–2013	AEL Limassol	105	(10)
2013–2015	Legia Warsaw	35	(4)
2015–2016	Konyaspor	4	(0)
2016	→ Eskişehirspor (loan)	5	(0)
2016–2020	AEL Limassol	50	(5)
Total		279	(22)

International career
2012–2019	Cyprus	24	(1)
- * Club domestic league appearances and goals

Dossa Momad Omar Hassamo Júnior (Greek: Ντόσσα Τζούνιορ; born 28 July 1986), known as Dossa Júnior, is a former professional footballer who played as a central defender.

He spent the better part of his 15-year senior career in the Cypriot First Division, mainly with AEL Limassol. He also competed in Portugal (where he was born), Poland and Turkey.

Born in Portugal, Júnior won 24 caps for Cyprus, making his debut in 2012.

== Club career ==
Júnior was born in Lisbon, of Mozambican descent. He only played with Imortal D.C. in Portugal, spending the 2005–06 season in the third tier. Subsequently, the 20-year-old moved to Cyprus, joining Digenis Akritas Morphou FC in the First Division and suffering relegation.

Júnior remained in that nation afterwards, with AEP Paphos FC. In 2009 he signed a contract with AEL Limassol, scoring three goals in 28 games in the 2011–12 campaign to help the latter win the national championship after a 44-year wait.

On 10 June 2015, after two years in Poland with Legia Warsaw, being first-choice as they won the Ekstraklasa in 2013–14, Júnior signed for Konyaspor. In the following transfer window, he was loaned to fellow Turkish Süper Lig team Eskişehirspor.

Júnior saw out his career at former side AEL. On 22 May 2019, his first-half header opened an eventual 2–0 victory against APOEL FC in the final of the Cypriot Cup, a first for the club in 30 years.

== International career ==
In 2012, following an extended career in the country, Júnior gained Cypriot nationality, being subsequently called up to play for the national team. He made his debut on 15 August that year, in the 1–0 friendly loss in Bulgaria.

== Personal life ==
Júnior's sister married fellow footballer Hélio Pinto.

== Career statistics ==
=== Club ===
Appearances and goals by club, season and competition
Club	Season	League			National cup (Note: Includes Taça de Portugal, Cypriot Cup, Polish Cup)		League cup		Continental		Other		Total	
Club	Season	Division	Apps	Goals	Apps	Goals	Apps	Goals	Apps	Goals	Apps	Goals	Apps	Goals
Imortal	2005–06	Segunda Divisão	15	0	1	0	—		—		—		16	0
Digenis Akritas	2006–07	Cypriot First Division	11	0			—		—		—		11	0
AEP Paphos	2007–08	Cypriot Second Division	23	2			—		—		—		23	2
AEP Paphos	2008–09	Cypriot First Division	31	1			—		—		—		31	1
AEP Paphos	Total		54	3			—		—		—		54	3
AEL Limassol	2009–10	Cypriot First Division	27	1			—		—		—		27	1
AEL Limassol	2010–11	Cypriot First Division	23	1			—		—		—		23	1
AEL Limassol	2011–12	Cypriot First Division	28	3	7	0	—		—		—		35	3
AEL Limassol	2012–13	Cypriot First Division	27	5	7	1	—		11 (Note: Six appearances and two goals in UEFA Champions League, five appearances in UEFA Europa League)	2	0	0	45	8
AEL Limassol	Total		105	10	14	1	—		11	2	0	0	130	13
Legia Warsaw	2013–14	Ekstraklasa	26	1	0	0	—		11 (Note: Six appearances in UEFA Champions League, five appearances in UEFA Europa League)	0	—		37	1
Legia Warsaw	2014–15	Ekstraklasa	9	3	1	0	—		6 (Note: Appearances in UEFA Europa League)	0	—		16	3
Legia Warsaw	Total		35	4	1	0	—		17	0	—		53	4
Konyaspor	2015–16	Süper Lig	4	0	0	0	—		—		—		4	0
Eskişehirspor (loan)	2015–16	Süper Lig	5	0	0	0	—		—		—		5	0
AEL Limassol	2016–17	Cypriot First Division	19	3	2	0	—		—		—		21	3
AEL Limassol	2017–18	Cypriot First Division	4	1	0	0	—		—		—		4	1
AEL Limassol	2018–19	Cypriot First Division	22	1	4	1	—		—		—		26	2
AEL Limassol	2019–20	Cypriot First Division	5	0	0	0	—		1	0	1 (Note: Appearance in Cypriot Super Cup)	0	7	0
AEL Limassol	Total		50	5	6	1	—		1	0	1	0	58	6
Career total			279	22	22	2	0	0	29	2	1	0	331	26

=== International ===
Scores and results list Cyprus' goal tally first, score column indicates score after each Júnior goal.

No	Date	Venue	Opponent	Score	Result	Competition
1.	10 October 2015	Teddy Stadium, Jerusalem, Israel	Israel	1–0	2–1	Euro 2016 qualifying

== Honours ==
AEL Limassol

- Cypriot First Division: 2011–12
- Cypriot Cup: 2018–19

Legia Warsaw

- Ekstraklasa: 2013–14
- Polish Cup: 2014–15
