= Tiago Valente =

Portuguese footballer

Personal information
- Full name: Tiago Carlos Morais Valente
- Date of birth: 24 April 1985 (age 41)
- Place of birth: Macedo de Cavaleiros, Portugal
- Height: 1.86 m (6 ft 1 in)
- Position: Centre-back

Youth career
- 1993–2004: Paços Ferreira

Senior career*
Years	Team	Apps	(Gls)
2004–2009	Paços Ferreira	39	(3)
2005–2006	→ Gondomar (loan)	31	(1)
2009	→ Aves (loan)	11	(1)
2009–2012	Aves	85	(3)
2012–2014	Paços Ferreira	48	(2)
2014–2016	Lechia Gdańsk	12	(0)
2014–2015	Lechia Gdańsk II	16	(3)
2015	→ Penafiel (loan)	13	(0)
2016	Vitória Setúbal	7	(0)
2016–2017	Aves	27	(2)
2017–2018	Varzim	24	(1)
2018–2021	São Martinho	78	(0)
2021–2022	Tirsense	22	(1)
2022–2023	São Martinho	19	(0)
Total		432	(17)

International career
2005–2006	Portugal U20	10	(0)
- * Club domestic league appearances and goals

Tiago Carlos Morais Valente (born 24 April 1985) is a Portuguese former professional footballer who played as a central defender.

== Club career ==
Born in Macedo de Cavaleiros, Bragança District, Valente started playing football with F.C. Paços de Ferreira, joining the club's youth system at the age of 8 and being promoted to the first team in 2004, making 15 Segunda Liga appearances with two goals in his first season. For 2005–06 he was loaned to Gondomar S.C. in the same league, subsequently returning to Paços; he made his Primeira Liga debut for the latter on 26 November 2006, coming on as a 90th-minute substitute in a 2–0 home win against C.D. Aves.

Valente was linked with a move to English Football League Championship side Charlton Athletic in January 2008 for a reported fee of £1.5 million, but nothing came of it. In the same month of the following year, he was loaned to Aves until the end of the campaign, and a permanent contract was agreed in July 2009.

In June 2012, after three full seasons in the second division, playing all the games and minutes in 2011–12 to help his team finish in third position, narrowly missing out on promotion, Valente returned to Paços de Ferreira for a second spell.
