= Maksymilian Rogalski =

Polish footballer

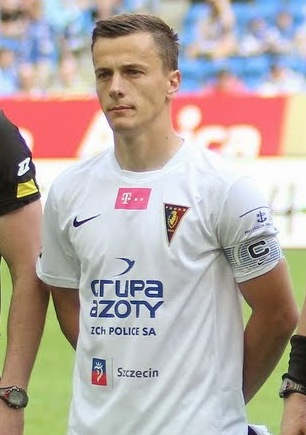
- Rogalski with Pogoń Szczecin in 2014

Personal information
- Full name: Maksymilian Rogalski
- Date of birth: 24 June 1983 (age 43)
- Place of birth: Częstochowa, Poland
- Height: 1.80 m (5 ft 11 in)
- Position: Defensive midfielder

Team information
- Current team: Pogoń Szczecin (academy coordinator)

Youth career
- –2001: Raków Częstochowa

Senior career*
Years	Team	Apps	(Gls)
2001–2008	Raków Częstochowa		
2008	Wisła Płock	13	(1)
2008–2009	Raków Częstochowa	20	(3)
2009–2015	Pogoń Szczecin	155	(8)
2015–2018	Wisła Płock	59	(1)
- * Club domestic league appearances and goals

Maksymilian Rogalski (born 24 June 1983) is a Polish former professional footballer who played as a defensive midfielder. He is currently Pogoń Szczecin's academy coordinator.

== Career ==
Rogalski started his career with Raków Częstochowa.
