= Paweł Szokaluk =

Polish association football player

Personal information
- Full name: Paweł Szokaluk
- Date of birth: 2 January 1991 (age 35)
- Place of birth: Chełm, Poland
- Height: 1.88 m (6 ft 2 in)
- Position: Goalkeeper

Youth career
- Sparta Rejowiec Fabryczny
- 2007: MSP Szamotuły

Senior career*
Years	Team	Apps	(Gls)
2008–2009	Unia Kunice Żary	26	(0)
2009–2011	Sparta Oborniki	5	(0)
2010	→ Pogoń Lwówek (loan)		
2011	→ Siarka Tarnobrzeg (loan)	2	(0)
2011–2014	Chełmianka Chełm	39	(0)
2014	Lechia Gdańsk	0	(0)
2014	Lechia Gdańsk II	6	(0)
Total		78	(0)
- * Club domestic league appearances and goals

Paweł Szokaluk (born 2 January 1991) is a Polish former professional footballer who played as a goalkeeper. He retired from professional football in 2014 having last played for Lechia Gdańsk II.

== Career ==
=== Club career ===
After playing the majority of his career in the lower leagues, Szokaluk made a surprise move to Lechia Gdańsk in 2014, becoming the third choice goalkeeper. At the end of the season, he was released from the club.

At the age of 23, and having failed to make any real impact on a competitive starting place for any team he played for, he retired from professional football in 2014.

After his retirement, Szokaluk founded the company PaMaMi, a company which manufactures and sells hats and scarves.
