= Adam Pazio =

Polish footballer

Personal information
- Full name: Adam Pazio
- Date of birth: 27 September 1992 (age 34)
- Place of birth: Wołomin, Poland
- Height: 1.82 m (6 ft 0 in)
- Position: Full-back

Youth career
- –2010: Huragan Wołomin
- 2010–2012: Polonia Warsaw

Senior career*
Years	Team	Apps	(Gls)
2011–2013	Polonia Warsaw	29	(0)
2013–2014	Lechia Gdańsk	19	(0)
2014–2016	Podbeskidzie Bielsko-Biała	35	(0)
2016–2017	Ruch Chorzów	12	(1)
2018–2019	Pogoń Siedlce	31	(1)
2019–2020	Kotwica Kołobrzeg	13	(0)
2020–2023	Polonia Warsaw	83	(10)
2023	Olimpia Zambrów	13	(1)
2023–2024	Wicher Kobyłka	38	(2)

International career
2012	Poland U20	6	(0)
2013	Poland U21	5	(0)
- * Club domestic league appearances and goals as of 19:59, 19 September 2025 (UTC)

Adam Pazio (born 27 September 1992) is a Polish professional footballer who plays as a full-back.

== Honours ==
Polonia Warsaw

- II liga: 2022–23
- III liga, group I: 2021–22
