= Łukasz Kacprzycki =

Polish footballer (born 1994)

Personal information
- Full name: Łukasz Kacprzycki
- Date of birth: 29 April 1994 (age 32)
- Place of birth: Kołobrzeg, Poland
- Height: 1.68 m (5 ft 6 in)
- Position: Midfielder

Youth career
- Orzeł Mrzeżyno
- Kotwica Kołobrzeg
- 2009–2011: Lechia Gdańsk

Senior career*
Years	Team	Apps	(Gls)
2011–2014	Lechia Gdańsk II	35	(3)
2011–2014	Lechia Gdańsk	13	(0)
2014	→ Wisła Płock (loan)	12	(0)
2014–2015	Wisła Płock	17	(1)
2015–2018	Kotwica Kołobrzeg	66	(7)
2018–2022	Wisła Puławy	86	(22)
2022	→ Stal Stalowa Wola (loan)	11	(0)
2022–2023	Vard Haugesund	7	(0)
2023	Bałtyk Koszalin	5	(1)
2023	Orzeł Mrzeżyno	2	(0)

International career
2012–2013	Poland U19	10	(3)
- * Club domestic league appearances and goals as of 29 April 2024

Łukasz Kacprzycki (born 29 April 1994) is a Polish professional footballer who plays as a midfielder.

== Honours ==
Wisła Puławy

- III liga, group IV: 2020–21
- Polish Cup (Lublin County regionals): 2020–21

Stal Stalowa Wola

- Polish Cup (Podkarpackie regionals): 2021–22
