= Aleksander Jagiełło =

Polish footballer

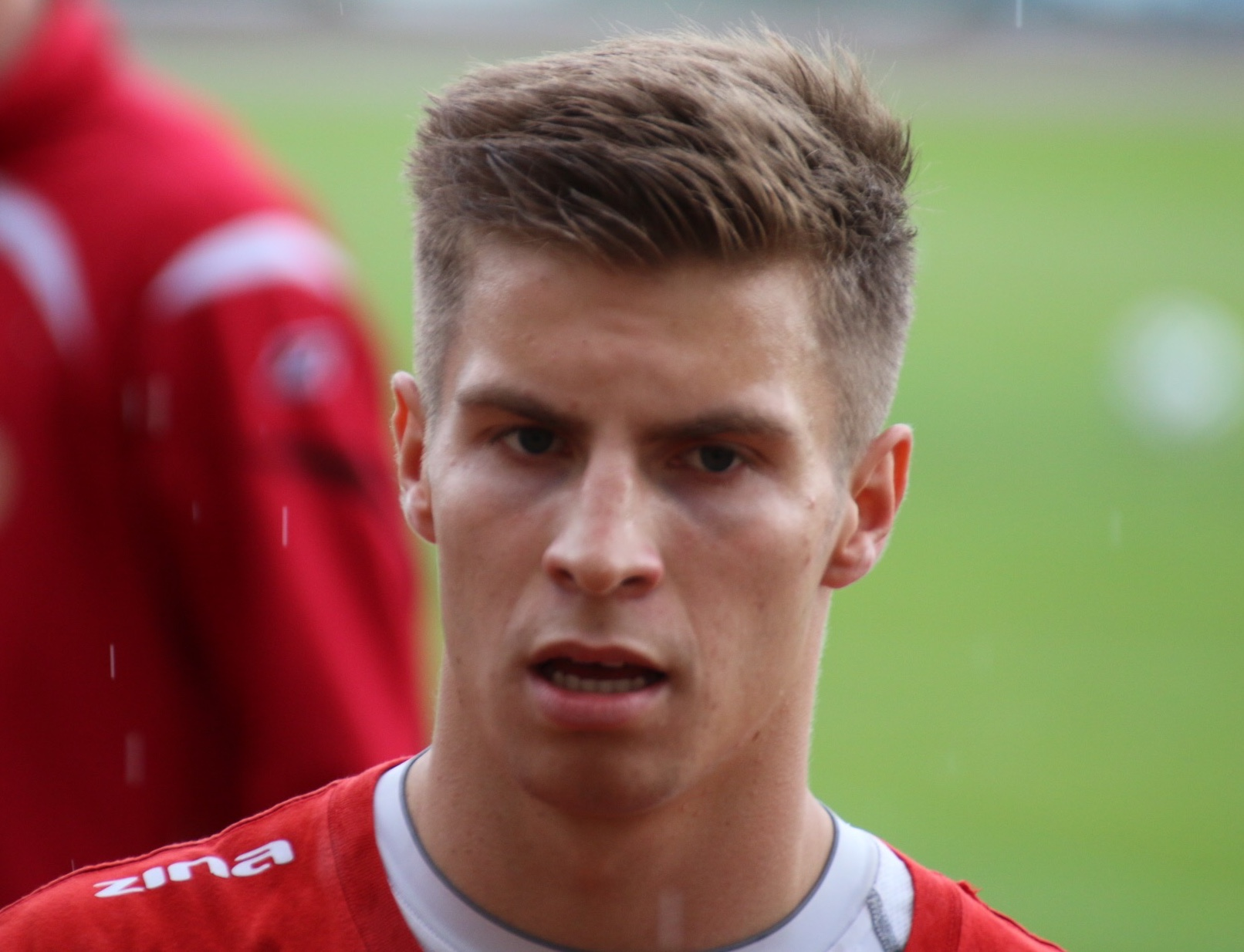
- Aleksander Jagiełło in 2016

Personal information
- Full name: Aleksander Jagiełło
- Date of birth: 2 February 1995 (age 31)
- Place of birth: Warsaw, Poland
- Height: 1.70 m (5 ft 7 in)
- Position: Winger

Youth career
- 2000–2013: Legia Warsaw

Senior career*
Years	Team	Apps	(Gls)
2013–2016	Legia Warsaw	0	(0)
2013	→ Podbeskidzie (loan)	18	(2)
2014	→ Lechia Gdańsk (loan)	3	(0)
2014	→ Lechia Gdańsk II (loan)	10	(0)
2014–2015	→ Arka Gdynia (loan)	17	(1)
2014–2015	→ Arka Gdynia II (loan)	8	(2)
2015–2016	→ Dolcan Ząbki (loan)	11	(1)
2016–2017	Znicz Pruszków	43	(10)
2017–2020	Piast Gliwice	27	(0)
2020	→ Chojniczanka Chojnice (loan)	8	(0)
2021–2022	Górnik Łęczna	11	(1)
Total		156	(17)

International career
	Poland U17	5	(0)
	Poland U18	1	(0)
	Poland U19	12	(0)
- * Club domestic league appearances and goals

Aleksander Jagiełło (born 2 February 1995) is a Polish former professional footballer who played as a winger.

== Career ==
Jagiełło is a youth exponent from Legia Warsaw. He made his debut in the Polish Ekstraklasa at 22 July 2013 in a 2–2 away draw against Lechia Gdańsk. He played the full 90 minutes. His loan was cut-short in January 2014.

On 30 January 2014, he was loaned to Lechia Gdańsk until the end of the season.

On 18 July 2015, he joined Dolcan Ząbki on loan. The loan finished on 29 February 2016.

On 10 June 2017, he signed a contract with Ekstraklasa side Piast Gliwice. He was loaned out to Chojniczanka Chojnice on 15 January 2020 for the rest of the season.

== Honours ==
Legia Warsaw

- Polish Cup: 2012–13

Piast Gliwice

- Ekstraklasa: 2018–19
