= Mateusz Możdżeń =

Polish footballer

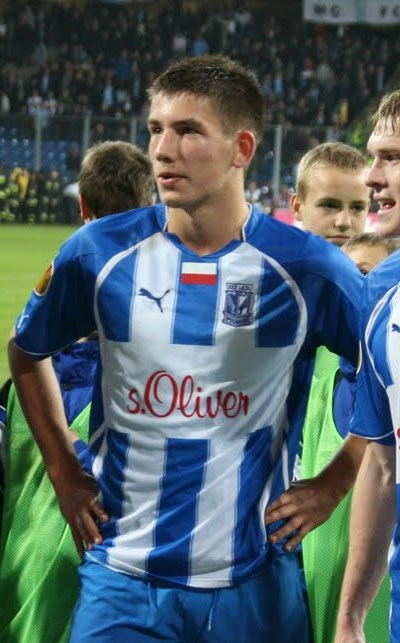
- Możdzeń with Lech Poznań in 2010

Personal information
- Date of birth: 14 March 1991 (age 35)
- Place of birth: Warsaw, Poland
- Height: 1.80 m (5 ft 11 in)
- Position: Midfielder

Team information
- Current team: Legia Warsaw II
- Number: 14

Youth career
- –2007: Ursus Warszawa
- 2007: Amica Wronki
- 2008–2009: Lech Poznań

Senior career*
Years	Team	Apps	(Gls)
2009–2014	Lech Poznań	109	(9)
2014–2015	Lechia Gdańsk	24	(0)
2014–2015	Lechia Gdańsk II	6	(2)
2015–2016	Podbeskidzie	33	(4)
2015	Podbeskidzie II	1	(0)
2016–2019	Korona Kielce	82	(7)
2019	Zagłębie Sosnowiec	14	(3)
2019–2021	Widzew Łódź	52	(5)
2021–2023	Znicz Pruszków	33	(2)
2023–	Legia Warsaw II	108	(23)

International career
2007	Poland U16	2	(0)
2007	Poland U17	2	(0)
2009–2010	Poland U19	9	(0)
2010–2011	Poland U20	5	(0)
2011	Poland U21	2	(0)
- * Club domestic league appearances and goals as of 21:54, 1 June 2026 (UTC)

Mateusz Możdżeń (born 14 March 1991) is a Polish professional footballer who plays as a midfielder for and captains II liga club Legia Warsaw II.

== Career ==
Możdżeń made his professional debut in an Ekstraklasa match against Wisła Kraków in October 2009.

On 4 November 2010, he scored a goal against Manchester City in the 2010–11 UEFA Europa League group stages. The goal came on a spectacular long-range strike in the 92nd minute to make the score 3–1, thus securing victory for Lech Poznań.

== Career statistics ==
As of match played 13 May 2026

Appearances and goals by club, season and competition
Club	Season	League			Polish Cup		Europe		Other		Total	
Club	Season	Division	Apps	Goals	Apps	Goals	Apps	Goals	Apps	Goals	Apps	Goals
Lech Poznań	2009–10	Ekstraklasa	12	0	0	0	0	0	0	0	12	0
Lech Poznań	2010–11	Ekstraklasa	13	1	2	0	4 (Note: Appearances in UEFA Europa League)	1	1 (Note: Appearance in Polish Super Cup)	0	20	2
Lech Poznań	2011–12	Ekstraklasa	26	4	3	0	—		—		29	4
Lech Poznań	2012–13	Ekstraklasa	25	1	1	0	6	2	—		32	3
Lech Poznań	2013–14	Ekstraklasa	33	3	2	0	3	0	—		38	3
Lech Poznań	Total		109	9	8	0	13	3	1	0	131	12
Lechia Gdańsk	2014–15	Ekstraklasa	24	0	1	0	—		—		25	0
Lechia Gdańsk II	2014–15	III liga, gr. D	6	2	—		—		—		6	2
Podbeskidzie Bielsko-Biała	2015–16	Ekstraklasa	33	4	2	0	—		—		35	4
Podbeskidzie II	2015–16	III liga, gr. F	1	0	—		—		—		1	0
Korona Kielce	2016–17	Ekstraklasa	36	4	0	0	—		—		36	4
Korona Kielce	2017–18	Ekstraklasa	32	2	5	1	—		—		37	3
Korona Kielce	2018–19	Ekstraklasa	14	1	1	0	—		—		15	1
Korona Kielce	Total		82	7	6	1	—		—		88	8
Zagłębie Sosnowiec	2018–19	Ekstraklasa	14	3	—		—		—		14	3
Widzew Łódź	2019–20	Ekstraklasa	27	3	2	0	—		—		29	3
Widzew Łódź	2020–21	I liga	25	2	2	0	—		—		27	2
Widzew Łódź	Total		52	5	4	0	—		—		56	5
Znicz Pruszków	2021–22	II liga	19	2	0	0	—		—		19	2
Znicz Pruszków	2022–23	II liga	14	0	1	0	—		—		15	0
Znicz Pruszków	Total		33	2	1	0	—		—		34	2
Legia Warsaw II	2022–23	III liga, gr. I	16	3	—		—		—		16	3
Legia Warsaw II	2023–24	III liga, gr. I	30	4	2	0	—		—		32	4
Legia Warsaw II	2024–25	III liga, gr. I	31	9	—		—		1 (Note: Appearance in II liga promotion/relegation play-offs)	0	32	9
Legia Warsaw II	2025–26	III liga, gr. I	30	7	1	0	—		—		31	7
Legia Warsaw II	Total		107	23	3	0	—		1	0	111	23
Career total			461	55	25	1	13	3	2	0	501	59

== Honours ==
Lech Poznań

- Ekstraklasa: 2009–10

Legia Warsaw II

- III liga, group I: 2025–26
- Polish Cup (Masovia regionals): 2022–23, 2024–25
