= Bytovia Bytów =

Polish football club

- Full name: Miejski Klub Sportowy; Bytovia Bytów
- Nicknames: Czarne Wilki (The Black Wolves)
- Founded: 1946; 80 years ago
- Ground: Municipal Stadium
- Capacity: 2,043
- Chairman: Łukasz Hinc
- Manager: Tomasz Bąkowski
- League: IV liga Pomerania
- 2023–24: Regional league Słupsk, 1st of 18 (promoted)
- Website: bytoviabytow.pl
Home colours	Away colours	Third colours

Bytovia Bytów is a Polish semi-professional association football club based in Bytów, founded in 1946. Bytovia currently plays in the IV liga Pomerania.

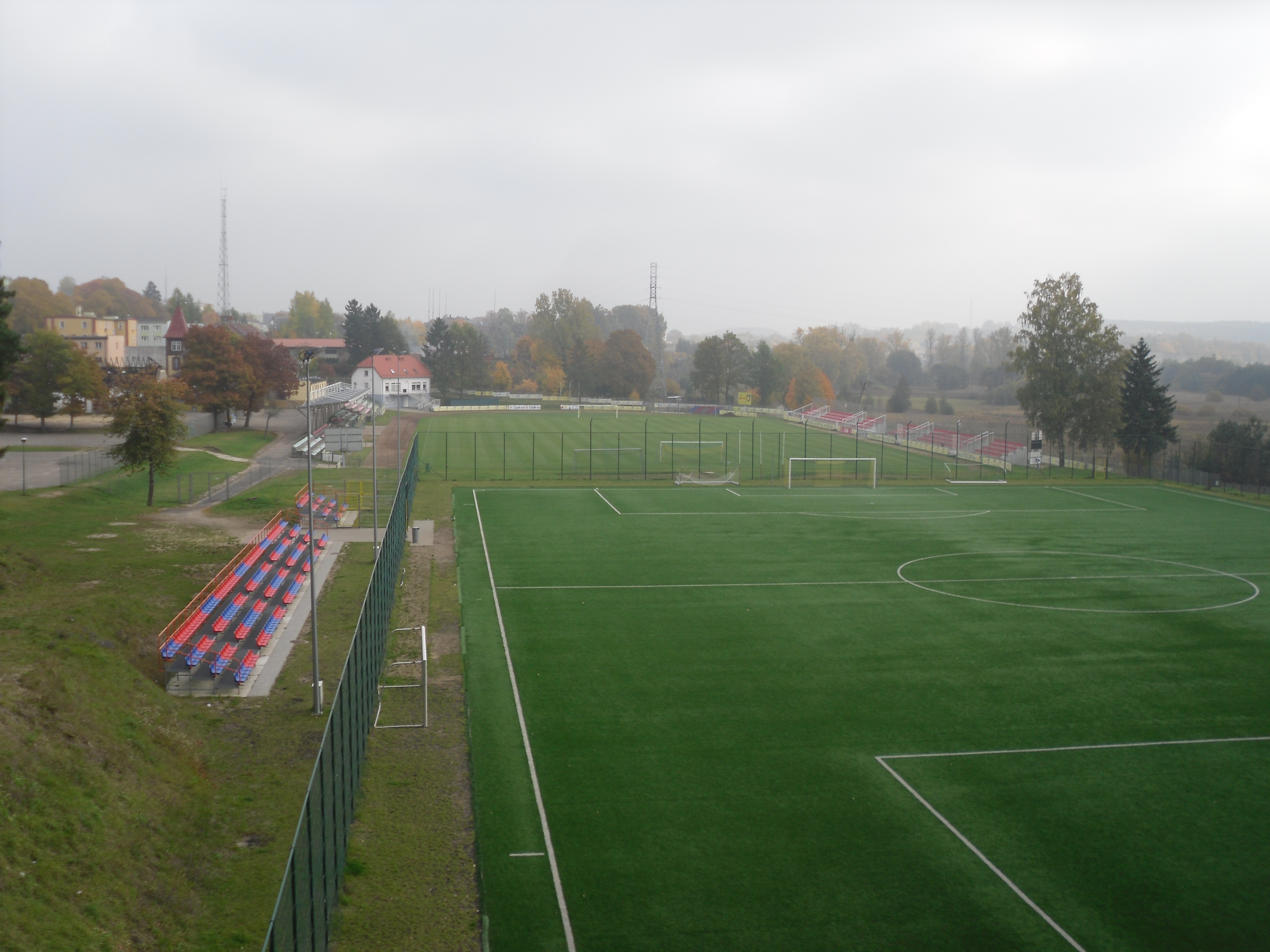
Municipal Stadium

== Names ==
Years	Name
1946–1949	KS Bytovia Bytów
1949–1955	KS Bytovia/Budowlani Bytów
1955–1956	ZS Gwardia Bytów
1956–1958	KS Sparta/Bytovia Bytów
1958–1962	LKS Bytovia Bytów
1962–1975	MKS Bytovia/Start Bytów
1975–1978	LZS Bytovia Bytów
1978–1992	MLKS Baszta Bytów
1992–2003	MKS Bytovia Bytów
2003–2018	MKS Drutex-Bytovia Bytów
2018–	MKS Bytovia Bytów

== Players ==
=== Current squad ===
As of 4 October 2020

Note: Flags indicate national team as defined under FIFA eligibility rules; some limited exceptions apply. Players may hold more than one non-FIFA nationality.

No.	Pos.	Nation	Player
1	GK	POL	Adrian Olszewski
2	DF	POL	Adrian Bielawski
4	DF	POL	Filip Dymerski (on loan from Lechia Gdansk)
5	MF	POL	Krzysztof Bąk
6	MF	POL	Paweł Zawistowski
7	MF	POL	Łukasz Wasiak
8	MF	POL	Mateusz Szela
9	FW	POL	Piotr Giel
10	MF	POL	Przemysław Lech
11	MF	POL	Jakub Bach
12	DF	POL	Marcel Damaschke
13	DF	POL	Kuba Lizakowski
16	MF	POL	Maciej Blaszkowski

No.	Pos.	Nation	Player
17	DF	POL	Patryk Wolski
18	MF	POL	Jakub Rys (on loan from Zagłębie Lubin)
19	MF	POL	Adam Szmidke
20	FW	POL	Oskar Sikorski
21	MF	POL	Mateusz Wrzesień
25	MF	POL	Dominik Urban
26	DF	BRA	Deleu
37	GK	POL	Marcin Staniszewski
46	DF	BRA	Matheus Camargo
65	DF	NED	Haris Memić
71	MF	POL	Sebastian Jezewski
77	MF	POL	Kamil Sikora
79	FW	POL	Kacper Sezonienko (on loan from Lechia Gdansk)

=== Out on loan ===
Note: Flags indicate national team as defined under FIFA eligibility rules; some limited exceptions apply. Players may hold more than one non-FIFA nationality.

No.	Pos.	Nation	Player
—	GK	POL	Bartosz Ryngwelski (at Wda Lipusz)

== League history ==
Season	Division	Position	Points	Goals	Notes
2002–03	Regional league (group Słupsk)	3	65	70–30	
2003–04	Regional league (group Słupsk)	3	70	102–30	
2004–05	Regional league (group Słupsk)	1	82	112–20	promotion
2005–06	IV liga Pomerania	4	63	60–38	
2006–07	IV liga Pomerania	4	61	53–35	
2007–08	IV liga Pomerania	4	60	50–31	League pyramid restructure
2008–09	III liga, group D	5	51	39–19	
2009–10	III liga, group D	14	29	43–45	
2010–11	III liga, group D	1	69	49–20	promotion
2011–12	II liga West	3	54	47–45	
2012–13	II liga West	3	63	53–33	
2013–14	II liga West	2	62	55–30	promotion
2014–15	I liga	13	40	39–45	
2015–16	I liga	8	48	46–44	
2016–17	I liga	15	35	38–47	
2017–18	I liga	13	40	36–45	
2018–19	I liga	16	37	45–50	relegation
2019–20	II liga	4	52	50–48	
2020–21	II liga	19	34	46–65	relegation
2021–22	IV liga Pomerania	8	42	41–41	
2022–23	IV liga Pomerania	17	38	47–60	relegation
2023–24	Regional league Słupsk	1	97	176–30	promotion

Key
Colour coded
II tier
III tier
IV tier
V tier

== Honours ==
- I liga
  - 8th place: 2015–16 (club's highest league finish)
- II liga
  - Runners-up: 2013–14
- Polish Cup
  - Quarter finals: 2016–17
  - Round of 16: 2009–10

Bytovia Bytów II

- Regional Polish Cup (Pomeranian Voivodeship)
  - Winners: 2007–08, 2008–09
  - Runners-up: 2006–07
