= Mariusz Przybylski =

Polish footballer (born 1982)

Personal information
- Full name: Mariusz Przybylski
- Date of birth: 19 January 1982 (age 44)
- Place of birth: Częstochowa, Poland
- Height: 1.83 m (6 ft 0 in)
- Position: Winger

Team information
- Current team: Unia Rędziny
- Number: 19

Youth career
- –2000: Błękitni Aniołów

Senior career*
Years	Team	Apps	(Gls)
2000–2007	Raków Częstochowa		
2008	Polonia Bytom	25	(0)
2009–2018	Górnik Zabrze	191	(10)
2018–2019	Polonia Bytom	6	(0)
2019–2020	RKS Radomsko	21	(1)
2020–	Unia Rędziny	58	(1)
- * Club domestic league appearances and goals as of 17:35, 6 January 2025 (UTC)

Mariusz Przybylski (born 19 January 1982) is a Polish professional footballer who plays as a winger for Unia Rędziny.

== Honours ==
RKS Radomsko

- IV liga Łódź: 2018–19

Unia Rędziny

- Regional league Silesia II: 2020–21
- Polish Cup (Częstochowa regionals): 2022–23
