= List of Polish football transfers summer 2016 =

This is a list of Polish football transfers in the 2016 summer transfer window by club. Only clubs in the 2016–17 Ekstraklasa are included.

== Ekstraklasa ==
=== Arka Gdynia ===
In:

No.	Pos.	Nation	Player
7	MF	POL	Adrian Błąd (Loan from Zagłębie Lubin)
20	MF	AUT	Dominik Hofbauer (From (Austria) Rheindorf Altach)
17	DF	POL	Adam Marciniak (From (Cyprus) AEK Larnaca)
4	DF	POL	Dawid Sołdecki (From Bruk-Bet Termalica Nieciecza)
1	GK	LVA	Pāvels Šteinbors (From (Cyprus) Nea Salamis)
—	MF	UKR	Andriy Vatseba (From (Ukraine) Chornohora Ivano-Frankivsk)
33	DF	POL	Damian Zbozień (From Zagłębie Lubin)
22	FW	POL	Dariusz Zjawiński (From Cracovia)

Out:

No.	Pos.	Nation	Player
33	DF	BRA	Alan Fialho
7	MF	POL	Dariusz Formella (Loan return to Lech Poznań)
20	FW	POL	Szymon Lewicki (Loan to Podbeskidzie Bielsko-Biała, previously transfer from Zawisza Bydgoszcz)
22	MF	FIN	Patrik Lomski (To (Finland) TPS)
24	GK	POL	Jakub Miszczuk (To Ruch Chorzów)
17	FW	ARG	Gastón Sangoy (To (India) Mumbai City)
28	MF	POL	Grzegorz Tomasiewicz (Loan to Pogoń Siedlce)

=== Bruk-Bet Termalica Nieciecza ===
In:

No.	Pos.	Nation	Player
1	GK	POL	Krzysztof Baran (From Jagiellonia Białystok)
10	MF	SVK	Roman Gergel (From Górnik Zabrze)
19	FW	SVK	Dávid Guba (From (Slovakia) Trenčín)
22	DF	BRA	Guilherme
28	MF	BIH	Vlastimir Jovanović (From Korona Kielce)
20	FW	POL	Dawid Nowak
15	DF	POL	Kornel Osyra (Loan from Piast Gliwice)
7	MF	SVK	Samuel Štefánik (From Podbeskidzie Bielsko-Biała)
96	DF	POL	Przemysław Szarek (From Sandecja Nowy Sącz)
12	GK	POL	Dariusz Trela (From Lechia Gdańsk)
14	DF	POL	Jakub Wróbel (Return from Siarka Tarnobrzeg)

Out:

No.	Pos.	Nation	Player
20	MF	POL	Jakub Biskup (To Chojniczanka Chojnice)
92	FW	SVN	Elvis Bratanović (To (Slovenia) Domžale)
7	MF	POL	Tomasz Foszmańczyk (To GKS Katowice)
27	DF	POL	Dariusz Jarecki (To Górnik Łęczna)
4	DF	POL	Michał Markowski (To Chojniczanka Chojnice)
90	FW	MNE	Stefan Nikolić (To (Serbia) Radnik Surdulica)
82	GK	POL	Sebastian Nowak (To GKS Katowice)
10	MF	POL	Dawid Plizga (Return to Górnik Zabrze)
2	DF	POL	Dawid Sołdecki (To Arka Gdynia)
22	GK	POL	Andrzej Witan (To Wisła Puławy)

=== Cracovia ===
In:

No.	Pos.	Nation	Player
2	DF	POL	Tomasz Brzyski (From Legia Warsaw)
28	MF	SVK	Jakub Čunta (From (Slovakia) FK Senica)
8	MF	SVK	Milan Dimun (From (Slovakia) FC VSS Košice)
40	GK	POL	Rafał Dobroliński (From GKS Katowice)
87	DF	BRA	Diego Ferraresso (From (Bulgaria) Slavia Sofia)
13	MF	POL	Radosław Kanach (From Stal Rzeszów)
4	DF	HUN	Róbert Litauszki (From (Hungary) Újpest)
22	DF	POL	Piotr Malarczyk (From (England) Ipswich Town)
99	FW	POL	Krzysztof Piątek (From Zagłębie Lubin)
16	MF	POL	Patryk Serafin (From Raków Częstochowa)
17	MF	POL	Sebastian Steblecki (From Górnik Zabrze)
20	FW	POL	Mateusz Szczepaniak (From Miedź Legnica)
9	FW	SVK	Tomáš Vestenický (From (Italy) Roma, previously on loan)

Out:

No.	Pos.	Nation	Player
17	MF	POL	Mateusz Argasiński (Return to Stal Stalowa Wola)
7	MF	SEN	Boubacar Dialiba (To (Turkey) Yeni Malatyaspor)
67	MF	POL	Bartosz Kapustka (To (England) Leicester City)
32	FW	POL	Krzysztof Szewczyk (Loan to Stomil Olsztyn)
23	DF	POL	Łukasz Zejdler (To GKS Katowice)
9	FW	POL	Dariusz Zjawiński (To Arka Gdynia)

=== Górnik Łęczna ===
In:

No.	Pos.	Nation	Player
25	MF	POL	Szymon Drewniak (Loan from Lech Poznań)
12	MF	GEO	Nika Dzalamidze (From (Turkey) Çaykur Rizespor)
16	DF	POL	Adam Dźwigała (Loan from Lechia Gdańsk)
4	DF	BRA	Gerson (Loan to Górnik Łęczna)
9	FW	POL	Piotr Grzelczak (From Jagiellonia Białystok)
10	MF	ESP	Javi Hernández (From (Romania) ACS Poli Timișoara)
21	DF	POL	Dariusz Jarecki (From Bruk-Bet Termalica Nieciecza)
11	MF	CRO	Slaven Juriša (From (Serbia) Dinamo Pančevo)
3	DF	POL	Aleksander Komor (From Motor Lublin)
1	GK	POL	Wojciech Małecki (From Kotwica Kołobrzeg)
30	GK	POL	Dawid Smug (From Miedź Legnica)
19	FW	SRB	Vojo Ubiparip (From (Serbia) Novi Pazar)
7	MF	SRB	Dragomir Vukobratović (From (Serbia) OFK Beograd)

Out:

No.	Pos.	Nation	Player
12	GK	LTU	Džiugas Bartkus (To (Malta) Valletta)
14	DF	POL	Jan Bednarek (Loan return to Lech Poznań)
20	DF	SVK	Lukáš Bielák (Bytovia Bytów)
24	DF	CRO	Tomislav Božić (To Wisła Płock)
26	DF	POL	Damian Jakubik (To Podbeskidzie Bielsko-Biała)
25	DF	POL	Marcin Kalkowski (To Gryf Wejherowo)
11	MF	ESP	Marquitos
4	MF	SRB	Veljko Nikitović (End of career)
7	MF	POL	Tomasz Nowak (To Zagłębie Sosnowiec)
1	GK	CRO	Silvio Rodić
14	MF	POL	Damian Szpak (Loan to Motor Lublin, previously at Orlęta Radzyń Podlaski)
10	FW	POL	Jakub Świerczok (To GKS Tychy)

=== Jagiellonia Białystok ===
In:

No.	Pos.	Nation	Player
7	MF	UKR	Dmytro Khomchenovskyi (From (Spain) Ponferradina)
18	FW	POL	Maciej Górski (From Chrobry Głogów)
25	GK	SVK	Marián Kelemen (From (Slovakia) Zemplín)
17	DF	CRO	Ivan Runje (From (Cyprus) Omonia)
2	DF	POL	Łukasz Sołowiej (From Zagłębie Sosnowiec)
95	MF	POL	Damian Szymański (From GKS Bełchatów)
96	GK	POL	Damian Węglarz (From Zawisza Bydgoszcz)

Out:

No.	Pos.	Nation	Player
10	MF	POR	Álvarinho (Loan to Śląsk Wrocław)
25	DF	POL	Rafał Augustyniak (Loan to Wigry Suwałki, previously at Pogoń Siedlce)
33	GK	POL	Krzysztof Baran (To Bruk-Bet Termalica Nieciecza)
18	DF	SVK	Martin Baran (To Podbeskidzie Bielsko-Biała, previously at Wigry Suwałki)
69	GK	POL	Bartłomiej Drągowski (To (Italy) Fiorentina)
12	FW	POL	Piotr Grzelczak (To Górnik Łęczna)
11	FW	POL	Damian Kądzior (To Wigry Suwałki)
7	DF	POL	Sebastian Madera (To Zagłębie Lubin)
2	DF	POL	Filip Modelski
9	FW	POL	Jan Pawłowski
24	DF	SVN	Matija Širok (To (Slovenia) Domžale)
19	DF	LVA	Igors Tarasovs (To (Turkey) Giresunspor)

=== Korona Kielce ===
In:

No.	Pos.	Nation	Player
9	MF	ESP	Dani Abalo (From (Spain) Deportivo Alavés)
33	GK	POL	Maciej Gostomski (From (Scotland) Rangers)
19	DF	EST	Ken Kallaste (From Górnik Zabrze)
15	MF	POL	Jacek Kiełb (From Śląsk Wrocław)
87	DF	POL	Krystian Miś (From Śląsk Wrocław)
8	MF	POL	Mateusz Możdżeń (From Podbeskidzie Bielsko-Biała)
17	MF	ESP	Miguel Palanca (From (Spain) Gimnàstic)
30	GK	SVK	Michal Peškovič

Out:

No.	Pos.	Nation	Player
18	FW	ESP	Airam Cabrera (To (Cyprus) Anorthosis)
87	MF	LVA	Aleksandrs Fertovs
8	MF	BIH	Vlastimir Jovanović (To Bruk-Bet Termalica Nieciecza)
39	DF	POL	Bartosz Kwiecień (Loan to Chrobry Głogów)
10	MF	POL	Bartłomiej Pawłowski (Return to Lechia Gdańsk)
9	MF	POL	Mariusz Rybicki (Loan to Miedź Legnica, previously transfer from Pogoń Siedlce)
15	MF	POL	Łukasz Sierpina (To Podbeskidzie Bielsko-Biała)
29	MF	POL	Paweł Sobolewski (Loan to MKS Ełk)
2	DF	POL	Kamil Sylwestrzak (To Wisła Płock)
12	GK	POL	Dariusz Trela (Return to Lechia Gdańsk)

=== Lech Poznań ===
In:

No.	Pos.	Nation	Player
35	DF	POL	Jan Bednarek (Loan return from Górnik Łęczna)
20	MF	POL	Dariusz Formella (Loan return from Arka Gdynia)
86	MF	POL	Radosław Majewski (From (Greece) Veria)
17	MF	POL	Maciej Makuszewski (Loan from Lechia Gdańsk)
3	DF	DEN	Lasse Nielsen (From (Denmark) OB)
30	GK	SVK	Matúš Putnocký (From Ruch Chorzów)

Out:

No.	Pos.	Nation	Player
21	DF	GAM	Kebba Ceesay (To (Sweden) Djurgårdens IF)
17	MF	POL	Szymon Drewniak (Loan to Górnik Łęczna, previously at Chrobry Głogów)
35	DF	POL	Marcin Kamiński (To (Germany) VfB Stuttgart)
77	MF	NOR	Muhamed Keita (Loan to (Norway) Stabæk, previously at (Norway) Strømsgodset)
27	GK	POL	Krzysztof Kotorowski (End of career)
34	FW	POL	Piotr Kurbiel (Loan to Pogoń Siedlce)
7	MF	POL	Karol Linetty (To (Italy) U.C. Sampdoria)
36	GK	POL	Mateusz Lis (Loan to Podbeskidzie Bielsko-Biała)
11	MF	HUN	Gergő Lovrencsics (To (Hungary) Ferencváros)
30	GK	POL	Adam Makuchowski (Loan to ROW 1964 Rybnik)
31	MF	POL	Krystian Sanocki (Loan to MKS Kluczbork)
25	MF	ESP	Sisi (To (Greece) Veria)
18	FW	GER	Denis Thomalla (To (Germany) 1. FC Heidenheim, previously on loan)
3	DF	MNE	Vladimir Volkov (Loan return to (Belgium) KV Mechelen)
37	MF	GER	Niklas Zulciak (To Lech II Poznań)

=== Lechia Gdańsk ===
In:

No.	Pos.	Nation	Player
38	MF	BUL	Milen Gamakov (From (Bulgaria) Botev Plovdiv)
30	DF	POR	João Nunes (From (Portugal) Benfica B)
13	MF	POL	Bartłomiej Pawłowski (Return from Korona Kielce)
43	DF	SVN	Denis Perger (From (Slovenia) Drava Ptuj)
77	GK	POL	Damian Podleśny (Return from Chojniczanka Chojnice)
6	MF	BUL	Simeon Slavchev (Loan from (Portugal) Sporting)
5	DF	CAN	Steven Vitória (From (Portugal) Benfica)
27	MF	POL	Rafał Wolski (From (Italy) Fiorentina)

Out:

No.	Pos.	Nation	Player
15	DF	POL	Adam Dźwigała (Loan to Górnik Łęczna)
1	GK	POL	Łukasz Budziłek (Loan to Chojniczanka Chojnice)
18	FW	POL	Adam Buksa (To Zagłębie Lubin)
4	DF	POL	Damian Garbacik (To GKS Katowice, previously at Chojniczanka Chojnice)
35	DF	BRA	Gerson (Loan to Górnik Łęczna)
28	FW	POL	Hieronim Gierszewski (Loan to Chojniczanka Chojnice, previously at GKS Bełchatów)
33	DF	SRB	Nikola Leković (To (Serbia) Napredak Kruševac, previously at (Serbia) Partizan)
—	MF	POL	Juliusz Letniowski (Loan to Bytovia Bytów)
8	MF	POL	Daniel Łukasik (Loan to (Germany) SV Sandhausen)
27	FW	POL	Przemysław Macierzyński (Loan to (Portugal) Benfica B)
9	MF	POL	Michał Mak (Loan to (Germany) Arminia Bielefeld)
11	MF	POL	Maciej Makuszewski (Loan to Lech Poznań, previously at (Portugal) Vitória Setúbal)
50	GK	CRO	Marko Marić (Return to (Germany) TSG 1899 Hoffenheim)
29	DF	SRB	Neven Marković
—	MF	JPN	Tsubasa Nishi (Previously at Stomil Olsztyn)
5	DF	GNB	Rudinilson (To (Netherlands) Fortuna Sittard)
12	GK	POL	Dariusz Trela (To Bruk-Bet Termalica Nieciecza, previously at Korona Kielce)

=== Legia Warsaw ===
In:

No.	Pos.	Nation	Player
4	DF	POL	Jakub Czerwiński (From Pogoń Szczecin)
5	DF	POL	Maciej Dąbrowski (From Zagłębie Lubin)
26	FW	CRO	Sandro Kulenović (From (Croatia) Dinamo Zagreb)
7	MF	MTQ	Steeven Langil (From (Belgium) Waasland-Beveren)
75	MF	FRA	Thibault Moulin (From (Belgium) Waasland-Beveren)
8	MF	BEL	Vadis Odjidja-Ofoe (From (England) Norwich City)
9	MF	GEO	Valeri Qazaishvili (Loan from (Netherlands) Vitesse)
32	MF	SRB	Miroslav Radović (From (Serbia) Partizan)
12	FW	GHA	Sadam Sulley (From (Ghana) Vision F.C.)

Out:

No.	Pos.	Nation	Player
—	FW	POL	Jakub Arak (To Ruch Chorzów, previously at Zagłębie Sosnowiec)
7	MF	POL	Ariel Borysiuk (To (England) QPR)
17	DF	POL	Tomasz Brzyski (To Cracovia)
8	MF	SVK	Ondrej Duda (To (Germany) Hertha BSC)
32	MF	POL	Konrad Handzlik (Loan to Zagłębie Sosnowiec, previously transfer from Wisła Kraków)
5	DF	POL	Artur Jędrzejczyk (Return to (Russia) Krasnodar)
13	MF	POL	Jakub Kosecki (To (Germany) SV Sandhausen, previously on loan)
4	DF	POL	Igor Lewczuk (To (France) Bordeaux)
47	MF	POL	Rafał Makowski (Loan to Pogoń Siedlce)
16	MF	POL	Michał Masłowski (Loan to Piast Gliwice)
—	FW	CRO	Tin Matić (Loan to Zagłębie Sosnowiec, previously transfer from (Croatia) Dinamo Zagreb)
20	FW	POL	Jarosław Niezgoda (Loan to Ruch Chorzów)
13	FW	POL	Arkadiusz Piech (To (Cyprus) Apollon Limassol)
9	FW	POL	Marek Saganowski
—	MF	MKD	Alban Sulejmani (Loan to Pogoń Siedlce, previously transfer from (North Macedonia) Renova)
—	GK	POL	Jakub Szumski (Loan to Zagłębie Sosnowiec)
21	MF	CRO	Ivica Vrdoljak (To Wisła Płock)

=== Piast Gliwice ===
In:

No.	Pos.	Nation	Player
10	FW	POL	Karol Angielski (Return from Zawisza Bydgoszcz)
4	DF	POL	Marcin Flis (Return from GKS Katowice)
93	DF	LTU	Edvinas Girdvainis (From (Spain) Marbella)
99	FW	AUT	Sandro Gotal (From (Turkey) Yeni Malatyaspor)
15	MF	POL	Michał Masłowski (Loan from Legia Warsaw)
96	FW	POL	Sebastian Musiolik (Return from ROW 1964 Rybnik)
25	DF	SRB	Aleksandar Sedlar (From (Serbia) Metalac)

Out:

No.	Pos.	Nation	Player
17	MF	POL	Cezary Demianiuk (To Pogoń Siedlce, previously at GKS Bełchatów)
—	DF	POL	Mateusz Długołęcki (Loan to Znicz Pruszków, previously at Chrobry Głogów)
7	MF	POL	Patrick Dytko (To (Germany) SSVg Velbert)
4	DF	CRO	Kristijan Ipša
29	FW	LVA	Artūrs Karašausks (Return to (Latvia) Skonto)
55	MF	POL	Jakub Kuzdra (Loan to Polonia Bytom)
6	MF	POL	Piotr Kwaśniewski (Loan to MKS Kluczbork)
13	GK	POL	Rafał Leszczyński (Loan to Podbeskidzie Bielsko-Biała)
16	FW	CZE	Martin Nešpor (Return to Sparta Prague)
28	DF	POL	Kornel Osyra (Loan to Bruk-Bet Termalica Nieciecza)
25	MF	CZE	Kamil Vacek (To (Israel) Maccabi Haifa)

=== Pogoń Szczecin ===
In:

No.	Pos.	Nation	Player
11	FW	BUL	Spas Delev (From (Bulgaria) Beroe Stara Zagora)
14	MF	POL	Kamil Drygas (From Zawisza Bydgoszcz)
84	GK	POL	Radosław Janukiewicz (Return from Górnik Zabrze)
24	DF	POL	David Niepsuj (From (Germany) VfL Bochum)
2	DF	ROU	Cornel Râpă (From (Romania) Steaua București)

Out:

No.	Pos.	Nation	Player
24	DF	POL	Błażej Chouwer (Loan to Kotwica Kołobrzeg)
4	DF	POL	Jakub Czerwiński (To Legia Warsaw)
20	MF	POL	Karol Danielak (To Chrobry Głogów, previously at Zawisza Bydgoszcz)
11	FW	GEO	Vladimir Dvalishvili (To (Georgia (country)) Dinamo Tbilisi)
—	FW	POL	Filip Kozłowski (Loan at Chojniczanka Chojnice, previously at Rozwój Katowice)
26	DF	POL	Sebastian Murawski (Loan to Chrobry Głogów)
14	MF	POL	Miłosz Przybecki (To Ruch Chorzów)
16	MF	POL	Michał Walski (To Ruch Chorzów)

=== Ruch Chorzów ===
In:

No.	Pos.	Nation	Player
9	FW	POL	Jakub Arak (From Legia Warsaw)
20	MF	POL	Piotr Ćwielong (From (Germany) VfL Bochum)
33	GK	SVK	Libor Hrdlička (From (Georgia (country)) Dinamo Tbilisi)
5	DF	POL	Marcin Kowalczyk (From (Russia) FC Tosno)
24	GK	POL	Jakub Miszczuk (From Arka Gdynia)
11	FW	POL	Jarosław Niezgoda (Loan from Legia Warsaw)
37	MF	POL	Bartosz Nowak (Loan from Miedź Legnica)
21	DF	POL	Adam Pazio (From Podbeskidzie Bielsko-Biała)
16	MF	POL	Miłosz Przybecki (From Pogoń Szczecin)
90	FW	LVA	Eduards Višņakovs (Loan from (Belgium) K.V.C. Westerlo)
8	MF	POL	Michał Walski (From Pogoń Szczecin)

Out:

No.	Pos.	Nation	Player
11	FW	POL	Michał Efir (To Bytovia Bytów)
7	MF	POL	Maciej Iwański
16	MF	POL	Konrad Korczyński (To Stal Stalowa Wola)
8	MF	POL	Artur Lenartowski (To GKS Bełchatów)
19	MF	POL	Tomasz Podgórski (To Podbeskidzie Bielsko-Biała)
30	GK	SVK	Matúš Putnocký (To Lech Poznań)
9	FW	POL	Adam Setla (Return to Nadwiślan Góra)
97	FW	POL	Łukasz Siedlik (Loan to Raków Częstochowa)
18	FW	POL	Mariusz Stępiński (To (France) FC Nantes)
20	DF	POL	Marek Szyndrowski (To Polonia Bytom)
29	MF	POL	Kamil Włodyka
5	MF	POL	Marek Zieńczuk

=== Śląsk Wrocław ===
In:

No.	Pos.	Nation	Player
14	MF	POR	Álvarinho (Loan from Jagiellonia Białystok)
5	DF	POR	Augusto (From (France) US Créteil)
9	MF	GER	Mario Engels (From (Germany) FSV Frankfurt)
6	MF	POR	Filipe Gonçalves (From (Portugal) Moreirense)
1	GK	SVK	Ľuboš Kamenár (From (Slovakia) Spartak Trnava)
—	MF	POL	Adrian Łyszczarz (From FC Wrocław Academy)
18	MF	POL	Łukasz Madej (From Górnik Zabrze)
—	MF	POL	Maciej Pałaszewski (Return from Raków Częstochowa, previously on loan)
22	FW	ESP	Sito Riera (From (Kazakhstan) Kairat)
7	MF	ESP	Joan Ángel Román (Loan from (Portugal) S.C. Braga)
32	MF	MKD	Ostoja Stjepanović (From (Cyprus) AEL Limassol)

Out:

No.	Pos.	Nation	Player
1	GK	POL	Mateusz Abramowicz (To GKS Katowice)
25	MF	POL	Michał Bartkowiak (To Miedź Legnica)
12	DF	BRA	Dudu Paraíba (To (Cyprus) Apollon Limassol)
15	MF	CZE	Marcel Gecov
8	MF	HUN	András Gosztonyi (To (Hungary) Várda SE)
4	MF	ENG	Tom Hateley (To (Scotland) Dundee F.C.)
6	MF	POL	Tomasz Hołota (To (Germany) Arminia Bielefeld)
18	FW	POL	Konrad Kaczmarek
9	MF	POL	Jacek Kiełb (To Korona Kielce)
—	DF	POL	Krystian Miś (To Korona Kielce)
2	DF	POL	Krzysztof Ostrowski (To Polonia Trzebnica)
7	MF	SVK	Róbert Pich (Return to (Germany) 1. FC Kaiserslautern)
14	MF	UKR	Ihor Tyschenko (To (Ukraine) Illichivets Mariupol)
22	GK	POL	Jakub Wrąbel (Loan to Olimpia Grudziądz)

=== Wisła Kraków ===
In:

No.	Pos.	Nation	Player
15	DF	POL	Adam Mójta (From Podbeskidzie Bielsko-Biała)
20	FW	POL	Mateusz Zachara (From (China) Henan Jianye)
24	GK	POL	Łukasz Załuska (From (Germany) SV Darmstadt 98)

Out:

No.	Pos.	Nation	Player
7	MF	UKR	Vitaliy Balashov
77	MF	HAI	Wilde-Donald Guerrier (To (Turkey) Alanyaspor)
25	MF	POL	Konrad Handzlik (To Legia Warsaw)
40	MF	POL	Grzegorz Marszalik (To Rozwój Katowice)
50	MF	BRA	Rafael Crivellaro (To (Portugal) Arouca)
11	MF	HAI	Emmanuel Sarki (To (Cyprus) AEL Limassol)
27	MF	POL	Rafał Wolski (Return to (Italy) Fiorentina)

=== Wisła Płock ===
In:

No.	Pos.	Nation	Player
24	DF	CRO	Tomislav Božić (From Górnik Łęczna)
8	MF	POL	Dominik Furman (Loan from (France) Toulouse)
27	MF	UKR	Vitaliy Hemeha (Loan from (Ukraine) Dynamo Kyiv)
29	FW	GUI	José Kanté (From Górnik Zabrze)
30	MF	BLR	Sergey Krivets (From (France) Metz)
10	MF	GEO	Giorgi Merebashvili (From (Greece) Levadiakos)
98	FW	POL	Krystian Popiela (From (Italy) Cagliari Calcio)
2	DF	POL	Kamil Sylwestrzak (From Korona Kielce)
12	MF	CRO	Ivica Vrdoljak (From Legia Warsaw)

Out:

No.	Pos.	Nation	Player
10	MF	POL	Jakub Bąk (To Bytovia Bytów)
8	FW	POL	Piotr Darmochwał (To Wisła Puławy)
16	DF	POL	Fabian Hiszpański (Return to Podbeskidzie Bielsko-Biała)
33	FW	SVK	Lukáš Kubus (To (Slovakia) Tatran Prešov)
11	FW	POL	Mikołaj Lebedyński (Loan to GKS Katowice)
89	MF	POL	Wojciech Łuczak (To Zagłębie Sosnowiec)
96	MF	POL	Jakub Łukowski (Loan to Olimpia Grudziądz, previously transfer from Zawisza Bydgoszcz)
14	DF	SRB	Marko Radić (To (Czech Republic) SFC Opava)

=== Zagłębie Lubin ===
In:

No.	Pos.	Nation	Player
21	FW	POL	Adam Buksa (From Lechia Gdańsk)
23	DF	POL	Daniel Dziwniel (From (Switzerland) St. Gallen)
77	DF	POL	Sebastian Madera (From Jagiellonia Białystok)
13	FW	CZE	Martin Nešpor (From (Czech Republic) Sparta Prague)
88	MF	LTU	Deimantas Petravičius (From (England) Nottingham Forest)
18	MF	POL	Filip Starzyński (From (Belgium) Lokeren, previously on loan)

Out:

No.	Pos.	Nation	Player
15	MF	POL	Adrian Błąd (Loan to Arka Gdynia)
8	MF	POL	Sebastian Bonecki (Loan to Chrobry Głogów)
25	MF	BRA	Luís Carlos
2	DF	POL	Maciej Dąbrowski (To Legia Warsaw)
26	FW	POL	Krzysztof Piątek (To Cracovia)
22	FW	POL	Eryk Sobków (Loan to GKS Katowice)
55	DF	POL	Damian Zbozień (To Arka Gdynia)
13	MF	POL	Karol Żmijewski (To Kotwica Kołobrzeg)
