= List of Polish football transfers summer 2017 =

This is a list of Polish football transfers in the 2017 summer transfer window by club. Only clubs in the 2017–18 Ekstraklasa are included.

== Ekstraklasa ==
=== Arka Gdynia ===
In:

No.	Pos.	Nation	Player
26	DF	POL	Adam Danch (From Górnik Zabrze)
28	DF	DEN	Frederik Helstrup (From (Sweden) Helsingborgs IF)
19	FW	CRO	Filip Jazvić (From (Romania) Universitatea Craiova)
9	FW	ESP	Rubén Jurado (From (Spain) Atlético Baleares)
22	DF	SVK	Tomáš Košút (From (Czech Republic) Slovácko)
20	MF	BLR	Sergey Krivets (From Wisła Płock)
24	MF	POL	Patryk Kun (Loan from Rozwój Katowice)
13	MF	POL	Grzegorz Piesio (From Górnik Łęczna)
80	GK	POL	Krzysztof Pilarz (From Bruk-Bet Termalica Nieciecza)
16	MF	ESP	Álvaro Rey (From (Greece) Panetolikos)
10	MF	POL	Mateusz Szwoch (Loan from Legia Warsaw, previously on loan)
44	FW	POL	Michał Żebrakowski (From Siarka Tarnobrzeg)

Out:

No.	Pos.	Nation	Player
9	FW	POL	Paweł Abbott (To Stomil Olsztyn)
90	FW	CRO	Josip Barišić (Return to Piast Gliwice)
7	MF	POL	Adrian Błąd (Return to Zagłębie Lubin)
19	MF	SVK	Miroslav Božok (To (Slovakia) Zemplín Michalovce)
77	MF	POL	Dariusz Formella (Return to Lech Poznań)
20	MF	AUT	Dominik Hofbauer (To (Austria) SKN St. Pölten)
13	GK	POL	Konrad Jałocha (Return to Legia Warsaw)
—	MF	POL	Adrian Klimczak (Loan to Olimpia Grudziądz, previously transferred from Gryf Wejherowo)
20	FW	POL	Szymon Lewicki (To Zagłębie Sosnowiec, previously on loan at Podbeskidzie Bielsko-Biała)
32	DF	POL	Przemysław Stolc (Loan to Chrobry Głogów)
26	FW	POL	Przemysław Trytko (To Chrobry Głogów)
24	MF	UKR	Andriy Vatseba (Previously on loan at Gryf Wejherowo)
25	MF	POL	Paweł Wojowski (Loan to GKS Bełchatów, previously on loan at Stomil Olsztyn)

=== Bruk-Bet Termalica Nieciecza ===
In:

No.	Pos.	Nation	Player
4	DF	HUN	Ákos Kecskés (Loan from (Italy) Atalanta)
80	MF	ROU	Gabriel Iancu (From (Romania) Viitorul Constanța)
2	DF	LAT	Vitālijs Maksimenko (From (Austria) Mattersburg)
—	MF	POL	Jakub Mrozik (From Korona Kielce)
82	GK	SVK	Ján Mucha (From (Slovakia) Slovan Bratislava)
20	MF	POL	Szymon Pawłowski (Loan from Lech Poznań)
28	MF	POL	Łukasz Piątek (From Zagłębie Lubin)
24	DF	POL	Kamil Słaby (From Sandecja Nowy Sącz)
17	MF	POL	Bartosz Szeliga (From Piast Gliwice)
18	FW	POL	Bartosz Śpiączka (From Górnik Łęczna)

Out:

No.	Pos.	Nation	Player
6	MF	POL	Bartłomiej Babiarz (To (Greece) Apollon Smyrnis)
22	DF	BRA	Guilherme (To Jagiellonia Białystok)
24	FW	POL	Wojciech Kędziora (To GKS Katowice)
88	MF	UKR	Volodymyr Koval (To Olimpia Grudziądz)
20	FW	POL	Dawid Nowak (To Puszcza Niepołomice)
15	DF	POL	Kornel Osyra (Return to Piast Gliwice)
80	GK	POL	Krzysztof Pilarz (To Arka Gdynia)
17	MF	SVK	Dalibor Pleva (To GKS Katowice)
5	DF	POL	Sebastian Ziajka

=== Cracovia ===
In:

No.	Pos.	Nation	Player
21	MF	POL	Adam Deja (From Podbeskidzie Bielsko-Biała)
25	MF	POL	Szymon Drewniak (From Lech Poznań)
34	DF	UKR	Oleksiy Dytyatev (From (Ukraine) Karpaty Lviv)
2	DF	SLO	Matic Fink (Loan from (Turkey) Çaykur Rizespor)
39	DF	POL	Michał Helik (From Ruch Chorzów)
19	MF	ESP	Javi Hernández (From (Azerbaijan) Gabala)
23	MF	SVK	Jaroslav Mihalík (From (Czech Republic) Slavia Prague, previously on loan)
40	GK	SVK	Michal Peškovič (From Korona Kielce)
3	DF	SVK	Michal Sipľak (From (Slovakia) Zemplín Michalovce)
46	DF	GER	Lennard Sowah (From (Scotland) Heart of Midlothian)
11	MF	POL	Mateusz Wdowiak (Return from Sandecja Nowy Sącz)
30	GK	POL	Adam Wilk (Return from Legionovia Legionowo)
10	MF	EST	Sergei Zenjov (From (Azerbaijan) Gabala)

Out:

No.	Pos.	Nation	Player
18	MF	POL	Hubert Adamczyk (Loan to Olimpia Grudziądz)
6	DF	ROU	Florin Bejan (To (Romania) Astra Giurgiu, previously on loan at (Romania) Concordia Chiajna)
2	DF	POL	Tomasz Brzyski (To Sandecja Nowy Sącz)
27	MF	POL	Marcin Budziński (To (Australia) Melbourne City)
10	MF	POL	Mateusz Cetnarski (Loan to Sandecja Nowy Sącz)
28	DF	SVK	Jakub Čunta
40	GK	POL	Rafał Dobroliński (To GKS Tychy)
44	DF	POL	Paweł Jaroszyński (To (Italy) Chievo)
62	FW	SVK	Erik Jendrišek (To (Greece) Xanthi)
4	DF	HUN	Róbert Litauszki (To (Hungary) Újpest)
24	DF	POL	Piotr Polczak (To (Romania) Astra Giurgiu)
19	GK	POL	Krystian Stępniowski (Loan to Pogoń Siedlce)
32	FW	POL	Krzysztof Szewczyk (Loan to Puszcza Niepołomice, previously on loan at Stomil Olsztyn)
21	DF	POL	Hubert Wołąkiewicz

=== Górnik Zabrze ===
In:

No.	Pos.	Nation	Player
9	MF	POL	Damian Kądzior (From Wigry Suwałki)
14	DF	POL	Michał Koj (From Ruch Chorzów)
4	DF	POL	Mateusz Wieteska (From Legia Warsaw)

Out:

No.	Pos.	Nation	Player
26	DF	POL	Adam Danch (To Arka Gdynia)
6	MF	SVK	Denis Jančo (Return to (Slovakia) AS Trenčín)
2	DF	POL	Bartosz Kopacz (To Zagłębie Lubin)
4	DF	POL	Rafał Kosznik (To Górnik Łęczna)
96	GK	POL	Mateusz Kuchta (Loan to Odra Opole)
—	MF	POL	Aleksander Kwiek (To Widzew Łódź)
36	MF	POL	Bartosz Pikul (Loan to Zagłębie Sosnowiec)
18	MF	POL	Dawid Plizga (To GKS Katowice)
23	FW	POL	Szymon Skrzypczak (To Odra Opole, previously on loan)

=== Jagiellonia Białystok ===
In:

No.	Pos.	Nation	Player
12	DF	BRA	Guilherme (From Bruk-Bet Termalica Nieciecza)
99	DF	POL	Bartosz Kwiecień (From Korona Kielce)
5	DF	SLO	Nemanja Mitrović ( (Slovenia) Olimpija Ljubljana)
81	GK	POL	Mariusz Pawełek (From Śląsk Wrocław)
26	MF	CZE	Martin Pospíšil (From (Czech Republic) Jablonec)
44	FW	POL	Łukasz Sekulski (Return from Piast Gliwice)
23	MF	POL	Piotr Wlazło (From Wisła Płock)

Out:

No.	Pos.	Nation	Player
—	MF	POR	Alvarinho (To (Portugal) Farense, previously on loan at Śląsk Wrocław)
67	DF	GEO	Luka Astiani (Loan to Wigry Suwałki)
—	MF	POL	Rafał Augustyniak (Loan to Miedź Legnica, previously on loan at Wigry Suwałki)
—	MF	POL	Kacper Falon
46	GK	POL	Hubert Gostomski (Loan to Radomiak Radom)
4	MF	POL	Jacek Góralski (To (Bulgaria) Ludogorets Razgrad)
66	GK	GEO	Luka Gugeshashvili (Loan to Podlasie Biała Podlaska)
27	FW	POL	Patryk Klimala (Loan to Wigry Suwałki)
11	MF	POL	Karol Mackiewicz (Loan to Wigry Suwałki)
13	MF	POL	Przemysław Mystkowski (Loan to Miedź Legnica)
—	DF	POL	Paweł Olszewski (Loan to Wigry Suwałki)
35	MF	POL	Dawid Polkowski (Loan to Pogoń Siedlce)
3	DF	POL	Jonatan Straus (Loan to Sandecja Nowy Sącz)
23	MF	POL	Damian Szymański (To Wisła Płock)
20	MF	POL	Dawid Szymonowicz (Loan to (Slovakia) Zlaté Moravce)
5	MF	EST	Konstantin Vassiljev (To Piast Gliwice)

=== Korona Kielce ===
In:

No.	Pos.	Nation	Player
55	DF	GRE	Ángelos Argýris (From (Germany) SC Weiche Flensburg 08)
33	GK	GER	Zlatan Alomerović
24	DF	USA	Shawn Barry (From (Germany) FSV Frankfurt)
20	MF	GER	Fabian Burdenski (From (Germany) FSV Frankfurt)
6	MF	SLO	Goran Cvijanović (From (Slovenia) NK Celje)
11	MF	GER	Michael Gardawski (From (Germany) Hansa Rostock)
25	GK	GER	Matthias Hamrol (From (Germany) 1. FC Köln II)
22	MF	CRO	Ivan Jukić (From (Croatia) RNK Split)
9	FW	GEO	Nika Kacharava (Loan from (Russia) Rostov)
21	MF	POL	Łukasz Kosakiewicz (From Chojniczanka Chojnice)
5	DF	BIH	Adnan Kovačević (From (Bosnia and Herzegovina) FK Sarajevo)
89	FW	ITA	Elia Soriano (From (Germany) Würzburger Kickers)

Out:

No.	Pos.	Nation	Player
17	MF	ESP	Dani Abalo (To (Spain) FC Cartagena)
82	GK	CAN	Milan Borjan (Return to (Bulgaria) Ludogorets)
28	DF	LAT	Vladislavs Gabovs (To (Cyprus) Pafos FC)
27	DF	POL	Rafał Grzelak (To (Scotland) Heart of Midlothian)
55	MF	POL	Jakub Kotarzewski (To Unia Solec Kujawski)
99	DF	POL	Bartosz Kwiecień (To Jagiellonia Białystok)
6	MF	SRB	Vanja Marković (To (North Macedonia) Vardar)
20	FW	BUL	Iliyan Mitsanski
37	MF	POL	Jakub Mrozik (To Bruk-Bet Termalica Nieciecza)
25	GK	UKR	Leonid Otczenaszenko (To Motor Lublin)
17	MF	ESP	Miguel Palanca (To (Cyprus) Anorthosis Famagusta)
30	GK	SVK	Michal Peškovič (To Cracovia)
—	FW	POL	Michał Przybyła (To Warta Poznań, previously on loan at Chojniczanka Chojnice)
5	MF	UKR	Serhiy Pylypchuk (To Wigry Suwałki)
—	MF	POL	Mariusz Rybicki (Loan to Wigry Suwałki, previously on loan at Miedź Legnica)
11	MF	POL	Tomasz Zając (To Stomil Olsztyn, previously on loan at Sandecja Nowy Sącz)

=== Lech Poznań ===
In:

No.	Pos.	Nation	Player
23	MF	SWE	Nicklas Bärkroth (From (Sweden) IFK Norrköping)
14	DF	ESP	Vernon De Marco (Loan from (Slovakia) Slovan Bratislava)
66	DF	AUT	Emir Dilaver (From (Hungary) Ferencváros)
2	DF	POL	Robert Gumny (Return from Podbeskidzie Bielsko-Biała)
32	FW	DEN	Christian Gytkjær (From (Germany) TSV 1860 Munich)
26	DF	POL	Rafał Janicki (Loan to Lech Poznań)
29	MF	POL	Kamil Jóźwiak (Return from GKS Katowice)
17	MF	POL	Maciej Makuszewski (From Lechia Gdańsk, previously on loan)
92	FW	LAT	Deniss Rakels (Loan from (England) Reading)
21	MF	POL	Jakub Serafin (Return from Bytovia Bytów)
16	MF	CRO	Mario Šitum (Loan from (Croatia) Dinamo Zagreb)
13	DF	MNE	Nikola Vujadinović (From (Spain) Osasuna)

Out:

No.	Pos.	Nation	Player
35	DF	POL	Jan Bednarek (To (England) Southampton)
26	MF	POL	Szymon Drewniak (To Cracovia, previously on loan at Górnik Łęczna)
20	MF	POL	Dariusz Formella (Loan to Pogoń Szczecin, previously on loan at Arka Gdynia)
77	MF	NOR	Muhamed Keita (To (United States) New York Red Bulls, previously on loan at (Norway) Vålerenga)
4	DF	POL	Tomasz Kędziora (To (Ukraine) Dynamo Kyiv)
44	DF	CRO	Elvis Kokalović
9	FW	POL	Dawid Kownacki (To (Italy) Sampdoria)
34	FW	POL	Piotr Kurbiel (Loan to Olimpia Elbląg, previously on loan at Pogoń Siedlce)
8	MF	POL	Szymon Pawłowski (Loan to Bruk-Bet Termalica Nieciecza)
11	FW	POL	Marcin Robak (To Śląsk Wrocław)
21	MF	POL	Jakub Serafin (Loan to (Norway) Haugesund)
25	FW	POL	Paweł Tomczyk (Loan to Podbeskidzie Bielsko-Biała)
26	DF	POL	Maciej Wilusz (To (Russia) Rostov)

=== Lechia Gdańsk ===
In:

No.	Pos.	Nation	Player
18	FW	POL	Jakub Arak (From Ruch Chorzów)
26	DF	POL	Błażej Augustyn (From (Italy) Ascoli)
8	FW	POR	Romário Baldé (From (Portugal) Benfica B)
13	DF	POL	Mateusz Lewandowski (From Pogoń Szczecin)
9	MF	POL	Patryk Lipski
35	MF	POL	Daniel Łukasik (Return to (Germany) SV Sandhausen)
32	MF	POL	Mateusz Matras (From Pogoń Szczecin)
2	MF	CRO	Mato Miloš (Loan from (Portugal) Benfica)
25	DF	POL	Michał Nalepa (From (Hungary) Ferencváros)
96	MF	SUI	João Oliveira (Loan from (Switzerland) FC Luzern)
77	GK	POL	Damian Podleśny (Return from Wigry Suwałki)
3	MF	POL	Florian Schikowski (From (Germany) Borussia Mönchengladbach)
20	DF	POL	Adam Chrzanowski (Return from (Italy) Fiorentina)

Out:

No.	Pos.	Nation	Player
24	GK	POL	Mateusz Bąk
—	GK	POL	Łukasz Budziłek (Loan to Wigry Suwałki, previously on loan at Chojniczanka Chojnice)
20	MF	POL	Michał Chrapek (To Śląsk Wrocław)
15	MF	POL	Adam Dźwigała (To Wisła Płock, previously on loan at Górnik Łęczna)
29	MF	POL	Karol Fila (Loan to Chojniczanka Chojnice)
38	MF	BUL	Milen Gamakov (Loan to Stomil Olsztyn, previously on loan at Ruch Chorzów)
—	DF	BRA	Gerson (Loan to (South Korea) Gangwon FC, previously on loan at Górnik Łęczna)
2	DF	POL	Rafał Janicki (Loan to Lech Poznań)
36	MF	POL	Martin Kobylański (To (Germany) Preußen Münster, previously on loan)
4	MF	SRB	Aleksandar Kovačević (To (Norway) Haugesund, previously on loan at Śląsk Wrocław)
9	MF	POL	Michał Mak (Loan to Śląsk Wrocław)
—	MF	POL	Maciej Makuszewski (To Lech Poznań, previously on loan)
22	DF	CRO	Mario Maloča (Loan to (Germany) SpVgg Greuther Fürth)
—	MF	POL	Daniel Mikołajewski (Loan to Stomil Olsztyn, previously on loan at GKS Tychy)
32	GK	SRB	Vanja Milinković-Savić (To (Italy) Torino)
13	MF	POL	Bartłomiej Pawłowski (To Zagłębie Lubin)
43	DF	SLO	Denis Perger
99	FW	CUW	Gino van Kessel (Return to (Czech Republic) Slavia Prague)
14	MF	POL	Piotr Wiśniewski

=== Legia Warsaw ===
In:

No.	Pos.	Nation	Player
34	DF	ESP	Iñaki Astiz (From (Cyprus) APOEL)
24	MF	POL	Robert Bartczak (Return from Zagłębie Sosnowiec)
91	GK	POL	Konrad Jałocha (Return from Arka Gdynia)
31	MF	POL	Krzysztof Mączyński (From Wisła Kraków)
13	MF	POL	Łukasz Moneta (From Ruch Chorzów)
11	FW	POL	Jarosław Niezgoda (Return from Ruch Chorzów)
8	MF	ITA	Cristian Pasquato (From (Italy) Juventus)
7	DF	POR	Hildeberto Pereira (From (Portugal) Benfica B)
99	FW	ALB	Armando Sadiku (From (Switzerland) Zürich)
29	GK	POL	Jakub Szumski (Return from Zagłębie Sosnowiec)

Out:

No.	Pos.	Nation	Player
—	DF	POL	Mateusz Hołownia (Loan to Ruch Chorzów)
—	MF	POL	Miłosz Kozak (Loan to Podbeskidzie Bielsko-Biała, previously on loan at Wigry Suwałki)
26	FW	CRO	Sandro Kulenović (Loan to (Italy) Juventus)
—	MF	MTQ	Steeven Langil (Previously on loan at (Belgium) Waasland-Beveren)
30	GK	POL	Radosław Majecki (Loan to Stal Mielec)
19	MF	POL	Rafał Makowski (Loan to Zagłębie Sosnowiec)
16	MF	POL	Michał Masłowski (To (Croatia) Gorica, previously on loan at Piast Gliwice)
77	FW	CRO	Tin Matić (Loan to (Slovakia) Zemplín Michalovce)
17	MF	POL	Konrad Michalak (Loan to Wisła Płock, previously on loan at Zagłębie Sosnowiec)
—	DF	POL	Tomasz Nawotka (Loan to Zagłębie Sosnowiec)
24	FW	CZE	Tomáš Necid (Return to (Turkey) Bursaspor)
8	MF	BEL	Vadis Odjidja-Ofoe (To (Greece) Olympiacos)
—	MF	POL	Adam Ryczkowski (To Chojniczanka Chojnice, previously on loan at Wigry Suwałki)
25	DF	POL	Jakub Rzeźniczak (To (Azerbaijan) Qarabag)
9	MF	GEO	Valeri Qazaishvili (Return to (Netherlands) Vitesse)
9	FW	FRA	Vamara Sanogo (Loan to Zagłębie Sosnowiec)
—	MF	MKD	Alban Sulejmani (To (Albania) Partizani Tirana)
—	FW	GHA	Sadam Sulley (Loan to (Slovakia) Zemplín Michalovce)
20	MF	POL	Mateusz Szwoch (Loan to Arka Gdynia, previously on loan)
—	MF	POL	Bartłomiej Urbański (To (Netherlands) Willem II)
—	DF	POL	Mateusz Wieteska (To Górnik Zabrze, previously on loan at Chrobry Głogów)

=== Piast Gliwice ===
In:

No.	Pos.	Nation	Player
10	FW	POL	Karol Angielski (Return from Olimpia Grudziądz)
90	FW	CRO	Josip Barišić (Return from Arka Gdynia)
11	MF	POL	Aleksander Jagiełło (From Znicz Pruszków)
20	DF	POL	Martin Konczkowski (From Ruch Chorzów)
—	MF	POL	Piotr Kwaśniewski (Return from MKS Kluczbork)
24	DF	CRO	Dario Rugašević (From (Romania) Gaz Metan Mediaș)
17	MF	ECU	Joel Valencia (From (Slovenia) Koper)
14	MF	EST	Konstantin Vassiljev (From Jagiellonia Białystok)

Out:

No.	Pos.	Nation	Player
45	MF	SVK	Lukáš Čmelík (Return to (Slovakia) Žilina)
17	MF	POL	Cezary Demianiuk (Previously on loan at Pogoń Siedlce)
—	DF	POL	Mateusz Długołęcki (Previously on loan at Znicz Pruszków)
93	DF	LTU	Edvinas Girdvainis (Loan to (Russia) Tom Tomsk)
55	MF	POL	Jakub Kuzdra (To Bytovia Bytów, previously on loan at Polonia Bytom)
13	GK	POL	Rafał Leszczyński (To Podbeskidzie Bielsko-Biała, previously on loan)
15	MF	POL	Michał Masłowski (Return to Legia Warsaw)
22	DF	POL	Tomasz Mokwa (To GKS Katowice)
2	DF	SVK	Patrik Mráz (To Sandecja Nowy Sącz)
9	MF	POL	Radosław Murawski (To (Italy) Palermo)
22	FW	POL	Sebastian Musiolik (To ROW 1964 Rybnik, previously on loan)
—	DF	POL	Kornel Osyra (To Miedź Legnica, previously on loan at Bruk-Bet Termalica Nieciecza)
—	MF	POL	Igor Sapała (Loan to Raków Częstochowa, previously on loan at GKS Katowice)
44	FW	POL	Łukasz Sekulski (Return to Jagiellonia Białystok)
46	MF	POL	Aleksander Sopel (Loan to Gwardia Koszalin)
26	MF	POL	Bartosz Szeliga (To Bruk-Bet Termalica Nieciecza)
—	DF	POL	Bartosz Waleńcik (Loan to Bytovia Bytów, previously transferred from Siarka Tarnobrzeg)

=== Pogoń Szczecin ===
In:

No.	Pos.	Nation	Player
—	DF	POL	Błażej Chouwer (Return from Kotwica Kołobrzeg)
21	DF	GEO	Lasha Dvali (From Śląsk Wrocław)
71	MF	POL	Dariusz Formella (Loan from Lech Poznań)
20	MF	POL	Tomasz Hołota (From (Germany) Arminia Bielefeld)
4	MF	POL	Jakub Piotrowski (Return from Stomil Olsztyn)
40	DF	POL	Sebastian Walukiewicz (From Legia II Warsaw)
1	GK	POL	Łukasz Załuska (To Pogoń Szczecin)
93	FW	POL	Łukasz Zwoliński (Return from Śląsk Wrocław)

Out:

No.	Pos.	Nation	Player
17	FW	TUR	Nadir Çiftçi (Return to (Scotland) Celtic)
18	FW	JPN	Seiya Kitano (Loan to Pogoń Siedlce)
66	GK	POL	Dawid Kudła (To Zagłębie Sosnowiec)
33	DF	POL	Mateusz Lewandowski (To Lechia Gdańsk, previously on loan at Śląsk Wrocław)
23	MF	POL	Mateusz Matras (To Lechia Gdańsk)
—	DF	POL	Sebastian Murawski (To Wisła Puławy, previously on loan at Rozwój Katowice)
32	MF	POL	Robert Obst (Loan to Wigry Suwałki)
1	GK	POL	Jakub Słowik (To Śląsk Wrocław)

=== Sandecja Nowy Sącz ===
In:

No.	Pos.	Nation	Player
70	DF	POL	Tomasz Brzyski (From Cracovia)
21	MF	POL	Mateusz Cetnarski (Loan from Cracovia)
9	MF	POL	Bartosz Gęsior (From Ruch Chorzów)
92	FW	BUL	Aleksandar Kolev (From Stal Mielec)
6	DF	BUL	Plamen Krachunov (From (Cyprus) Ethnikos Achna)
22	DF	SVK	Patrik Mráz (From Piast Gliwice)
—	GK	POL	Dawid Pietrzkiewicz (From (Azerbaijan) Gabala)
2	DF	POL	Jonatan Straus (Loan from Jagiellonia Białystok)

Out:

No.	Pos.	Nation	Player
19	DF	POL	Adrian Jurkowski (To Wigry Suwałki)
24	DF	POL	Kamil Słaby (To Bruk-Bet Termalica Nieciecza)
9	MF	POL	Mateusz Wdowiak (Return to Cracovia)
29	MF	POL	Tomasz Zając (Return to Korona Kielce)

=== Śląsk Wrocław ===
In:

No.	Pos.	Nation	Player
6	MF	POL	Michał Chrapek (From Lechia Gdańsk)
4	DF	SRB	Đorđe Čotra (From Zagłębie Lubin)
2	DF	SLO	Boban Jović (Loan from (Turkey) Bursaspor)
7	FW	POL	Jakub Kosecki (From (Germany) SV Sandhausen)
14	MF	POL	Michał Mak (Loan from Lechia Gdańsk)
29	FW	POL	Arkadiusz Piech (From (Cyprus) Apollon Limassol)
9	FW	POL	Marcin Robak (From Lech Poznań)
27	GK	POL	Jakub Słowik (From Pogoń Szczecin)
8	MF	SRB	Dragoljub Srnić (From (Serbia) Čukarički)
32	MF	LAT	Igors Tarasovs (From (Turkey) Giresunspor)
10	MF	CZE	Kamil Vacek (From (Israel) Maccabi Haifa)
1	GK	POL	Jakub Wrąbel (Return from Olimpia Grudziądz)

Out:

No.	Pos.	Nation	Player
14	MF	POR	Alvarinho (Return to Jagiellonia Białystok)
19	FW	POL	Kamil Biliński (To Wisła Płock)
21	DF	GEO	Lasha Dvali (To Pogoń Szczecin, previously on loan at (Kazakhstan) Irtysh Pavlodar)
9	MF	GER	Mario Engels (To (Netherlands) Roda JC Kerkrade)
29	MF	SVK	Peter Grajciar (To (Czech Republic) 1. FK Příbram)
27	FW	POL	Mariusz Idzik (To Miedź Legnica, previously on loan at Wisła Puławy)
1	GK	SVK	Ľuboš Kamenár (To (Hungary) Vasas SC)
8	MF	SRB	Aleksandar Kovačević (Return to Lechia Gdańsk)
28	DF	POL	Mateusz Lewandowski (Return to Pogoń Szczecin)
10	MF	JPN	Ryota Morioka (To (Belgium) Waasland-Beveren)
33	GK	POL	Mariusz Pawełek (To Jagiellonia Białystok)
7	MF	ESP	Joan Ángel Román (Return to (Portugal) Braga)
11	MF	POL	Oktawian Skrzecz (Loan to GKS Katowice, previously at (Germany) Schalke 04 II)
32	MF	MKD	Ostoja Stjepanović (To (North Macedonia) Rabotnički)
15	DF	POL	Łukasz Wiech (Loan to Górnik Łęczna)
23	DF	POL	Paweł Zieliński (To Miedź Legnica)
11	FW	POL	Łukasz Zwoliński (Return to Pogoń Szczecin)

=== Wisła Kraków ===
In:

No.	Pos.	Nation	Player
15	DF	CRO	Zoran Arsenić (From (Croatia) NK Osijek)
71	FW	UKR	Denys Balanyuk (From (Ukraine) Dnipro)
20	MF	ALB	Vullnet Basha (From (Spain) UCAM Murcia)
10	FW	ESP	Carlitos (From (Spain) Villarreal B)
1	GK	ESP	Julián Cuesta (From (Spain) Almería)
8	MF	CRO	Tibor Halilović (From (Croatia) Lokomotiva)
11	FW	ESP	Jesús Imaz (From (Spain) Cádiz)
24	FW	CRO	Marko Kolar (From (Croatia) Lokomotiva)
77	MF	SVK	Martin Košťál (From (Slovakia) Spartak Trnava)
21	MF	ESP	Víctor Pérez (From (Spain) Real Valladolid)
44	DF	ESP	Fran Vélez (From (Spain) Almería)
26	MF	POL	Kamil Wojtkowski (From (Germany) RB Leipzig)
70	MF	POR	Zé Manuel (Loan from (Portugal) Porto)

Out:

No.	Pos.	Nation	Player
21	MF	CRO	Petar Brlek (To (Italy) Genoa)
—	FW	POL	Krzysztof Drzazga (Loan to Chojniczanka Chojnice, previously on loan at Stal Mielec)
16	MF	COL	Cristian Echavarría (Return to (Colombia) Independiente Medellín)
42	DF	POL	Krystian Kujawa (To Podbeskidzie Bielsko-Biała, previously on loan at Garbarnia Kraków)
29	MF	POL	Krzysztof Mączyński (From Wisła Kraków)
1	GK	POL	Michał Miśkiewicz (To (Portugal) Feirense)
41	DF	POL	Jakub Ptak (Loan to Gryf Wejherowo)
11	MF	POL	Wojciech Słomka (Loan to GKS Katowice)
33	DF	CRO	Matija Špičić
18	MF	BIH	Semir Štilić (To Wisła Płock)
8	MF	POL	Alan Uryga (To Wisła Płock)
10	MF	COL	Ever Valencia (Return to (Colombia) Independiente Medellín)
93	MF	FRA	Hugo Vidémont (To (Belgium) Tubize)
36	GK	POL	Mateusz Zając (Previously at Motor Lublin)
20	FW	POL	Mateusz Zachara (To (Portugal) Tondela)
24	GK	POL	Łukasz Załuska (To Pogoń Szczecin)

=== Wisła Płock ===
In:

No.	Pos.	Nation	Player
19	FW	POL	Kamil Biliński (From Śląsk Wrocław)
14	MF	POL	Adam Dźwigała (From Lechia Gdańsk)
8	MF	POL	Dominik Furman (From (France) Toulouse, previously on loan)
45	FW	POL	Mikołaj Lebedyński (Return from GKS Katowice)
26	DF	POL	Igor Łasicki (Loan from (Italy) Napoli)
96	MF	POL	Jakub Łukowski (Return from Olimpia Grudziądz)
77	MF	POL	Konrad Michalak (Loan from Legia Warsaw)
11	DF	ROU	Paul Pîrvulescu (From (Austria) SKN St. Pölten)
6	MF	POL	Damian Rasak (From Miedź Legnica)
23	MF	BIH	Semir Štilić (From Wisła Kraków)
4	MF	POL	Damian Szymański (From Jagiellonia Białystok)
18	DF	POL	Alan Uryga (From Wisła Kraków)
7	MF	URU	Nico Varela (From (Greece) Larissa)

Out:

No.	Pos.	Nation	Player
24	DF	CRO	Tomislav Božić (To Miedź Legnica)
19	FW	POL	Emil Drozdowicz (To Chojniczanka Chojnice)
41	FW	BUL	Dimitar Iliev (To Podbeskidzie Bielsko-Biała)
26	GK	POL	Bartosz Kaniecki
97	DF	POL	Dawid Kieplin (Loan to Pogoń Siedlce)
30	MF	BLR	Sergey Krivets (To Arka Gdynia)
22	MF	POL	Dominik Kun (Loan to Pogoń Siedlce)
7	MF	POL	Damian Piotrowski
98	FW	POL	Krystian Popiela (To Olimpia Grudziądz)
6	MF	NOR	Harmeet Singh (To (Sweden) Kalmar FF)
25	DF	POL	Przemysław Szymiński (To (Italy) Palermo)
18	MF	POL	Piotr Wlazło (To Jagiellonia Białystok)

=== Zagłębie Lubin ===
In:

No.	Pos.	Nation	Player
3	DF	MNE	Saša Balić (From (Romania) CFR Cluj)
8	MF	POL	Sebastian Bonecki (Return from Chrobry Głogów)
44	DF	POL	Alan Czerwiński (From GKS Katowice)
2	DF	POL	Bartosz Kopacz (From Górnik Zabrze)
25	MF	POL	Adam Matuszczyk (From (Germany) Eintracht Braunschweig)
11	MF	POL	Bartłomiej Pawłowski (From Lechia Gdańsk)
70	FW	POL	Jakub Świerczok (From GKS Tychy)
89	FW	POL	Patryk Tuszyński (From (Turkey) Çaykur Rizespor)

Out:

No.	Pos.	Nation	Player
15	MF	POL	Adrian Błąd (To GKS Katowice, previously on loan at Arka Gdynia)
3	DF	SRB	Đorđe Čotra (To Śląsk Wrocław)
—	MF	POL	Radosław Dzierbicki (Return to ROW 1964 Rybnik)
77	DF	POL	Sebastian Madera
22	GK	POL	Zbigniew Małkowski
13	FW	CZE	Martin Nešpor (Loan to (Albania) Skënderbeu Korçë)
88	MF	LTU	Deimantas Petravičius (To (Scotland) Motherwell)
28	MF	POL	Łukasz Piątek (To Bruk-Bet Termalica Nieciecza)
17	MF	POL	Adrian Rakowski (To Podbeskidzie Bielsko-Biała)
11	FW	POL	Artur Siemaszko (Loan to Stomil Olsztyn)
—	FW	POL	Eryk Sobków (Loan to Znicz Pruszków, previously on loan at Kotwica Kołobrzeg)
90	MF	SVK	Ján Vlasko (To (Slovakia) Spartak Trnava)
—	MF	POL	Karol Żmijewski (Loan to Warta Poznań, previously on loan at Raków Częstochowa)
