= List of Polish football transfers winter 2016–17 =

This is a list of Polish football transfers in the 2016–17 winter transfer window by club. Only clubs in the 2016–17 Ekstraklasa are included.

== Ekstraklasa ==
=== Arka Gdynia ===
In:

| No. | Pos. | Nation | Player |
|---|---|---|---|
| 90 | FW | (Croatia) CRO | Josip Barišić (Loan from Piast Gliwice) |
| 77 | MF | (Poland) POL | Dariusz Formella (Loan from Lech Poznań) |
| 26 | FW | (Poland) POL | Przemysław Trytko (From (Kazakhstan) Atyrau) |
| 45 | MF | (Georgia (country)) GEO | Luka Zarandia (From (Georgia (country)) Locomotive Tbilisi) |

Out:

| No. | Pos. | Nation | Player |
|---|---|---|---|
| — | MF | (Norway) NOR | Saibou Keita (Loan to (Norway) Egersunds IK, previously transfer) |
| 18 | MF | (England) ENG | Rashid Yussuff (To (Iceland) ÍA Akranes) |
| 25 | MF | (Poland) POL | Paweł Wojowski (Loan to Stomil Olsztyn) |
| 24 | MF | (Ukraine) UKR | Andriy Vatseba (Loan to Gryf Wejherowo) |
| 22 | FW | (Poland) POL | Dariusz Zjawiński (To Pogoń Siedlce) |

=== Bruk-Bet Termalica Nieciecza ===
In:

| No. | Pos. | Nation | Player |
|---|---|---|---|
| 16 | MF | (Slovakia) SVK | Martin Mikovič (From (Slovakia) Spartak Trnava) |
| 33 | MF | (Poland) POL | Krystian Peda (From Pogoń Szczecin) |

Out:

| No. | Pos. | Nation | Player |
|---|---|---|---|
| 99 | MF | (Slovakia) SVK | Martin Juhar (To (Germany) FSV Zwickau) |
| 18 | DF | (Slovakia) SVK | Pavol Staňo (To (Slovakia) ŠK Čierne) |

=== Cracovia ===
In:

| No. | Pos. | Nation | Player |
|---|---|---|---|
| 23 | MF | (Slovakia) SVK | Jaroslav Mihalík (Loan from (Czech Republic) Slavia Prague) |

Out:

| No. | Pos. | Nation | Player |
|---|---|---|---|
| 6 | DF | (Romania) ROU | Florin Bejan (Loan to (Romania) Concordia Chiajna) |
| 71 | MF | (Bulgaria) BUL | Anton Karachanakov (Loan to (Bulgaria) Beroe Stara Zagora) |
| 11 | MF | (Poland) POL | Mateusz Wdowiak (Loan to Sandecja Nowy Sącz) |
| 30 | GK | (Poland) POL | Adam Wilk (Loan to Legionovia Legionowo) |

=== Górnik Łęczna ===
In:

| No. | Pos. | Nation | Player |
|---|---|---|---|
| 37 | DF | (North Macedonia) MKD | Stefan Aškovski (Loan from (Netherlands) Fortuna Sittard) |
| 13 | MF | (Peru) PER | Josimar Atoche (From (Peru) Alianza Lima) |
| 14 | DF | (Romania) ROU | Gabriel Matei (From (Romania) ASA Târgu Mureș) |

Out:

| No. | Pos. | Nation | Player |
|---|---|---|---|
| 93 | DF | (Poland) POL | Łukasz Bogusławski (Loan to Zagłębie Sosnowiec) |
| 11 | MF | (Croatia) CRO | Slaven Juriša (Loan to Motor Lublin) |
| 17 | MF | (Poland) POL | Radosław Pruchnik (Loan to GKS Tychy) |
| — | MF | (Poland) POL | Damian Szpak (To Radomiak Radom, previously at Motor Lublin) |

=== Jagiellonia Białystok ===
In:

| No. | Pos. | Nation | Player |
|---|---|---|---|
| 2 | DF | (Scotland) SCO | Ziggy Gordon (From (Scotland) Partick Thistle) |
| 9 | FW | (Lithuania) LTU | Arvydas Novikovas (From (Germany) VfL Bochum) |
| 18 | FW | (Republic of Ireland) IRL | Cillian Sheridan (From (Cyprus) Omonia) |

Out:

| No. | Pos. | Nation | Player |
|---|---|---|---|
| 55 | MF | (Poland) POL | Kacper Falon (Loan to Olimpia Zambrów) |
| 18 | FW | (Poland) POL | Maciej Górski (Loan to Korona Kielce) |
| — | FW | (Poland) POL | Łukasz Sekulski (Loan to Piast Gliwice, previously at Korona Kielce) |
| 2 | DF | (Poland) POL | Łukasz Sołowiej (To Raków Częstochowa) |

=== Korona Kielce ===
In:

| No. | Pos. | Nation | Player |
|---|---|---|---|
| 82 | GK | (Canada) CAN | Milan Borjan (Loan from (Bulgaria) Ludogorets) |
| 16 | FW | (Poland) POL | Maciej Górski (Loan from Jagiellonia Białystok) |
| 99 | DF | (Poland) POL | Bartosz Kwiecień (Return from Chrobry Głogów) |
| 20 | FW | (Bulgaria) BUL | Iliyan Mitsanski (From (Bulgaria) Levski Sofia) |
| 37 | MF | (Poland) POL | Jakub Mrozik (From Chojniczanka Chojnice) |
| 93 | FW | (Poland) POL | Michał Smolarczyk (From Wierna Małogoszcz) |
| 14 | MF | (Poland) POL | Jakub Żubrowski (From Stal Mielec) |

Out:

| No. | Pos. | Nation | Player |
|---|---|---|---|
| 33 | GK | (Poland) POL | Maciej Gostomski (Loan to Chojniczanka Chojnice) |
| 1 | GK | (Poland) POL | Zbigniew Małkowski (To Zagłębie Lubin) |
| 2 | DF | (Poland) POL | Krystian Miś (Loan to Legionovia Legionowo) |
| 88 | MF | (Poland) POL | Michał Mokrzycki (Loan to Stal Stalowa Wola) |
| 77 | FW | (Poland) POL | Michał Przybyła (Loan to Chojniczanka Chojnice) |
| 44 | FW | (Poland) POL | Łukasz Sekulski (Return to Jagiellonia Białystok) |
| 4 | MF | (Canada) CAN | Charlie Trafford (To Sandecja Nowy Sącz) |
| 13 | DF | (Belarus) BLR | Dzmitry Verkhawtsow (To (Belarus) Neman Grodno) |
| 11 | MF | (Poland) POL | Tomasz Zając (Loan to Sandecja Nowy Sącz) |
| 4 | DF | (Poland) POL | Maciej Załęcki (Loan to MKS Kluczbork) |

=== Lech Poznań ===
In:

| No. | Pos. | Nation | Player |
|---|---|---|---|
| 21 | MF | (Colombia) COL | Víctor Gutiérrez (Loan from (Colombia) Deportes Tolima) |
| 44 | DF | (Croatia) CRO | Elvis Kokalović (From (Turkey) Karabükspor) |
| 22 | DF | (Ukraine) UKR | Volodymyr Kostevych (From (Ukraine) Karpaty Lviv) |
| 18 | MF | (Romania) ROU | Mihai Răduț (From (United Arab Emirates) Hatta Club) |

Out:

| No. | Pos. | Nation | Player |
|---|---|---|---|
| 23 | DF | (Finland) FIN | Paulus Arajuuri (To (Denmark) Brøndby IF) |
| 20 | MF | (Poland) POL | Dariusz Formella (Loan to Arka Gdynia) |
| 2 | DF | (Poland) POL | Robert Gumny (Loan to Podbeskidzie Bielsko-Biała) |
| 29 | MF | (Poland) POL | Kamil Jóźwiak (Loan to GKS Katowice) |
| 5 | DF | (Hungary) HUN | Tamás Kádár (To (Ukraine) Dynamo Kyiv) |
| 77 | MF | (Norway) NOR | Muhamed Keita (Loan to (Norway) Vålerenga, previously at (Norway) Stabæk) |
| 36 | GK | (Poland) POL | Mateusz Lis (Loan to Raków Częstochowa, previously at Podbeskidzie Bielsko-Biała) |
| — | GK | (Poland) POL | Adam Makuchowski (Loan to Chrobry Głogów, previously at KS ROW 1964 Rybnik) |
| — | MF | (Poland) POL | Krystian Sanocki (Loan to Kotwica Kołobrzeg, previously at MKS Kluczbork) |

=== Lechia Gdańsk ===
In:

| No. | Pos. | Nation | Player |
|---|---|---|---|
| 16 | MF | (Poland) POL | Ariel Borysiuk (Loan from (England) Queens Park Rangers) |
| 99 | FW | (Curaçao) CUW | Gino van Kessel (Loan from (Czech Republic) Slavia Prague) |
| 1 | GK | (Slovakia) SVK | Dušan Kuciak (From (England) Hull City) |
| 9 | MF | (Poland) POL | Michał Mak (Return from (Germany) Arminia Bielefeld) |
| 33 | GK | (Croatia) CRO | Oliver Zelenika |

Out:

| No. | Pos. | Nation | Player |
|---|---|---|---|
| 38 | MF | (Bulgaria) BUL | Milen Gamakov (Loan to Ruch Chorzów) |
| 36 | MF | (Poland) POL | Martin Kobylański (Loan to (Germany) Preußen Münster) |
| 4 | MF | (Serbia) SRB | Aleksandar Kovačević (Loan to Śląsk Wrocław) |
| — | MF | (Poland) POL | Daniel Mikołajewski (Loan to GKS Tychy, previously transfer from Podbeskidzie Bielsko-Biała) |
| 77 | GK | (Poland) POL | Damian Podleśny (Loan to Wigry Suwałki) |

=== Legia Warsaw ===
In:

| No. | Pos. | Nation | Player |
|---|---|---|---|
| 27 | FW | (Nigeria) NGA | Daniel Chima Chukwu (From (China) Shanghai Shenxin) |
| 55 | DF | (Poland) POL | Artur Jędrzejczyk (From (Russia) Krasnodar) |
| — | MF | (Poland) POL | Rafał Makowski (Return from Pogoń Siedlce) |
| 21 | MF | (Hungary) HUN | Dominik Nagy (From (Hungary) Ferencváros) |
| 24 | FW | (Czech Republic) CZE | Tomáš Necid (Loan from (Turkey) Bursaspor) |
| — | FW | (France) FRA | Vamara Sanogo (From Zagłębie Sosnowiec) |
| — | MF | (North Macedonia) MKD | Alban Sulejmani (Return from Pogoń Siedlce) |

Out:

| No. | Pos. | Nation | Player |
|---|---|---|---|
| 77 | MF | (Bulgaria) BUL | Mihail Aleksandrov (To (Russia) Arsenal Tula) |
| 19 | DF | (Poland) POL | Bartosz Bereszyński (To (Italy) Sampdoria) |
| 7 | MF | (Martinique) MTQ | Steeven Langil (Loan to (Belgium) Waasland-Beveren) |
| — | MF | (Poland) POL | Konrad Michalak (Loan to Zagłębie Sosnowiec) |
| 11 | FW | (Hungary) HUN | Nemanja Nikolić (To (United States) Chicago Fire) |
| 99 | FW | (Switzerland) SUI | Aleksandar Prijović (To (Greece) PAOK) |
| 45 | FW | (Poland) POL | Adam Ryczkowski (Loan to Wigry Suwałki) |
| 23 | MF | (Bosnia and Herzegovina) BIH | Stojan Vranješ (To Piast Gliwice) |
| — | DF | (Poland) POL | Mateusz Wieteska (Loan to Chrobry Głogów) |

=== Piast Gliwice ===
In:

| No. | Pos. | Nation | Player |
|---|---|---|---|
| 45 | MF | (Slovakia) SVK | Lukáš Čmelík (Loan from (Slovakia) Žilina) |
| 17 | DF | (Poland) POL | Adam Mójta (From Wisła Kraków) |
| 27 | FW | (Czech Republic) CZE | Michal Papadopulos (From Zagłębie Lubin) |
| 44 | FW | (Poland) POL | Łukasz Sekulski (Loan from Jagiellonia Białystok) |
| 23 | MF | (Bosnia and Herzegovina) BIH | Stojan Vranješ (From Legia Warsaw) |
| 12 | MF | (Slovenia) SVN | Saša Živec (Return from (Italy) Latina) |

Out:

| No. | Pos. | Nation | Player |
|---|---|---|---|
| 10 | FW | (Croatia) CRO | Josip Barišić (Loan to Arka Gdynia) |
| 99 | FW | (Austria) AUT | Sandro Gotal (To (Israel) Ashdod) |
| 11 | MF | (Poland) POL | Paweł Moskwik (To Podbeskidzie Bielsko-Biała) |
| 96 | FW | (Poland) POL | Sebastian Musiolik (Loan to ROW 1964 Rybnik) |
| 77 | MF | (Poland) POL | Igor Sapała (Loan to GKS Katowice) |

=== Pogoń Szczecin ===
In:

| No. | Pos. | Nation | Player |
|---|---|---|---|
| 17 | FW | (Turkey) TUR | Nadir Çiftçi (Loan from (Scotland) Celtic) |
| 8 | MF | (Georgia (country)) GEO | Mate Tsintsadze (From (Georgia (country)) Dinamo Tbilisi) |

Out:

| No. | Pos. | Nation | Player |
|---|---|---|---|
| 27 | MF | (Japan) JPN | Takafumi Akahoshi (To (Thailand) Ratchaburi Mitr Phol) |
| — | GK | (Poland) POL | Radosław Janukiewicz (To (Norway) Strømsgodset) |
| — | FW | (Poland) POL | Filip Kozłowski (To Rozwój Katowice) |
| 33 | DF | (Poland) POL | Mateusz Lewandowski (Loan to Śląsk Wrocław) |
| — | DF | (Poland) POL | Sebastian Murawski (Loan to Rozwój Katowice, previously at Chrobry Głogów) |
| 19 | MF | (Poland) POL | Jakub Piotrowski (Loan to Stomil Olsztyn) |
| — | MF | (Poland) POL | Krystian Peda (To Bruk-Bet Termalica Nieciecza) |
| 93 | FW | (Poland) POL | Łukasz Zwoliński (Loan to Śląsk Wrocław) |

=== Ruch Chorzów ===
In:

| No. | Pos. | Nation | Player |
|---|---|---|---|
| 38 | MF | (Bulgaria) BUL | Milen Gamakov (Loan from Lechia Gdańsk) |

Out:

| No. | Pos. | Nation | Player |
|---|---|---|---|
| 20 | MF | (Poland) POL | Piotr Ćwielong (To (Germany) 1. FC Magdeburg) |
| 22 | MF | (Poland) POL | Łukasz Hanzel (To Podbeskidzie Bielsko-Biała) |
| 27 | MF | (Poland) POL | Kamil Mazek (To Zagłębie Lubin) |
| 84 | GK | (Poland) POL | Wojciech Skaba (To Zagłębie Sosnowiec) |

=== Śląsk Wrocław ===
In:

| No. | Pos. | Nation | Player |
|---|---|---|---|
| 8 | MF | (Serbia) SRB | Aleksandar Kovačević (Loan from Lechia Gdańsk) |
| 28 | DF | (Poland) POL | Mateusz Lewandowski (Loan from Pogoń Szczecin) |
| 16 | MF | (Slovakia) SVK | Róbert Pich (From (Germany) 1. FC Kaiserslautern) |
| 11 | FW | (Poland) POL | Łukasz Zwoliński (Loan from Pogoń Szczecin) |

Out:

| No. | Pos. | Nation | Player |
|---|---|---|---|
| 21 | DF | (Georgia (country)) GEO | Lasha Dvali (Loan to (Kazakhstan) Irtysh Pavlodar) |
| 6 | MF | (Portugal) POR | Filipe Gonçalves (To (Portugal) C.D. Nacional) |
| 27 | FW | (Poland) POL | Mariusz Idzik (Loan to Wisła Puławy) |
| 11 | FW | (Hungary) HUN | Bence Mervó (Loan return to (Switzerland) Sion) |

=== Wisła Kraków ===
In:

| No. | Pos. | Nation | Player |
|---|---|---|---|
| 5 | DF | (Poland) POL | Jakub Bartkowski (From Wigry Suwałki) |
| 16 | MF | (Colombia) COL | Cristian Echavarría (Loan from (Colombia) Independiente Medellín) |
| 32 | DF | (Spain) ESP | Iván González López (From (Spain) Alcorcón) |
| 7 | MF | (Spain) ESP | Pol Llonch (From (Spain) Girona) |
| 33 | DF | (Croatia) CRO | Matija Špičić (From (Georgia (country)) Dinamo Tbilisi) |
| 18 | MF | (Bosnia and Herzegovina) BIH | Semir Štilić |
| 10 | MF | (Colombia) COL | Ever Valencia (Loan from (Colombia) Independiente Medellín) |
| 93 | MF | (France) FRA | Hugo Vidémont (From (France) Ajaccio) |

Out:

| No. | Pos. | Nation | Player |
|---|---|---|---|
| 13 | FW | (Poland) POL | Krzysztof Drzazga (Loan to Stal Mielec) |
| 26 | DF | (Hungary) HUN | Richárd Guzmics (To (China) Yanbian Funde) |
| 5 | DF | (Slovenia) SVN | Boban Jović (To (Turkey) Bursaspor) |
| 42 | DF | (Poland) POL | Krystian Kujawa (Loan to Garbarnia Kraków) |
| 15 | DF | (Poland) POL | Adam Mójta (To Piast Gliwice) |
| 10 | MF | (Slovenia) SVN | Denis Popović (To (Russia) Orenburg) |
| 3 | DF | (Poland) POL | Piotr Żemło (Loan to Wisła Puławy) |

=== Wisła Płock ===
In:

| No. | Pos. | Nation | Player |
|---|---|---|---|
| 27 | FW | (Poland) POL | Mateusz Piątkowski (From (Cyprus) APOEL) |
| 6 | MF | (Norway) NOR | Harmeet Singh (From (Norway) Molde) |

Out:

| No. | Pos. | Nation | Player |
|---|---|---|---|
| 27 | MF | (Ukraine) UKR | Vitaliy Hemeha (Return to (Ukraine) Dynamo Kyiv) |
| 23 | MF | (Poland) POL | Piotr Mroziński (To Pogoń Siedlce) |
| 12 | MF | (Croatia) CRO | Ivica Vrdoljak (End of career) |

=== Zagłębie Lubin ===
In:

| No. | Pos. | Nation | Player |
|---|---|---|---|
| 22 | GK | (Poland) POL | Zbigniew Małkowski (From Korona Kielce) |
| 6 | MF | (Poland) POL | Kamil Mazek (From Ruch Chorzów) |
| — | MF | (Poland) POL | Radosław Dzierbicki (Loan from KS ROW 1964 Rybnik) |
| — | MF | (Poland) POL | Bartosz Slisz (From KS ROW 1964 Rybnik) |

Out:

| No. | Pos. | Nation | Player |
|---|---|---|---|
| 27 | FW | (Czech Republic) CZE | Michal Papadopulos (To Piast Gliwice) |
| 22 | FW | (Poland) POL | Eryk Sobków (Loan to Kotwica Kołobrzeg, previously at GKS Katowice) |
| — | MF | (Poland) POL | Karol Żmijewski (Loan to Raków Częstochowa, previously at Kotwica Kołobrzeg) |
