= Popiela =

Popiela is a Polish surname. Notable people with the surname include:

- Dariusz Popiela (born 1985), Polish canoeist
- Jarosław Popiela (born 1974), Polish footballer
- Krystian Popiela (1998–2018), Polish footballer
