= Malecki =

Malecki (Polish pronunciation: [maˈlɛt͡ski]; feminine: Malecka; plural: Maleccy) or Małecki (Polish pronunciation: [maˈwɛt͡ski]; feminine: Małecka; plural: Małeccy) is a surname. It is usually derived from place names such as Małki. In Poland, the surname with Ł is over ten times more frequent.

Language	Masculine	Feminine
Polish	Małecki, Malecki	Małecka, Malecka
Russian (Romanization)	Малецкий (Maletsky, Maletskiy, Maleckij)	Малецкая (Maletskaya, Maletskaia, Maleckaja)
Ukrainian (Romanization)	Малецький (Maletskyi, Maletskyy, Maleckyj)	Малецька (Maletska, Malecka)

== People ==
- Aleksander Małecki (1901–1939), Polish fencer
- Dariusz Małecki (born 1975), Polish field hockey player
- Edmund Malecki (1914–2001), German footballer
- Hieronim Malecki (1527 – 1583 or 1584), Polish Lutheran pastor and theologian
- Grzegorz Małecki (born 1967), Polish historian and diplomat
- Jean Malecki, American public health official
- John Malecki (born 1988), American football player
- Kamil Małecki (born 1996), Polish cyclist
- Maciej Małecki (born 1940), Polish composer and pianist
- Mieczysław Małecki (1903–1946), Polish linguist
- Patryk Małecki (born 1988), Polish footballer
- Przemysław Małecki (born 1983), Polish football manager
- Wanda Malecka (1800–1860), Polish editor, translator, poet, novelist, printer, publisher and journalist
- Władysław Malecki (1836–1900), Polish painter
- Wojciech Małecki (born 1990), Polish footballer

== Variants ==
Many of the Malecki immigrants into the USA had the spelling of their names changed due to the pronunciation of the letter "C", which is pronounced as "TS" in Polish. Outside of Poland the Malecki name now has many kinds of spelling, such as Maletsky, Maleski, Malesky, and Maleshki.
