= Krzysztof Baran =

Krzysztof Baran may refer to:

- Krzysztof Baran (footballer, born 1960), Polish footballer
- Krzysztof Baran (footballer, born 1990), Polish footballer
