= Przybecki =

Przybecki is a surname. Notable people with the surname include:

- Miłosz Przybecki (born 1991), Polish footballer
- Piotr Przybecki (born 1972), Polish handball player
