= Seiya Kitano =

Japanese footballer

Seiya Kitano 北野晴矢
Personal information
- Full name: 北野晴矢
- Date of birth: 2 August 1997 (age 29)
- Place of birth: Ōita, Japan
- Height: 1.68 m (5 ft 6 in)
- Position: Forward

Youth career
- 2013–2015: Nagoya Grampus Eight

Senior career*
Years	Team	Apps	(Gls)
2016–2019	Pogoń Szczecin II	45	(13)
2016–2018	Pogoń Szczecin	18	(1)
2017–2018	→ Pogoń Siedlce (loan)	4	(0)
2019	Auda	6	(6)
Total		73	(20)
- * Club domestic league appearances and goals

Seiya Kitano (北野 晴矢, Kitano Seiya; born 2 August 1997) is a Japanese former professional footballer who played as a forward.

== Career ==
In 2019, Seiya joined Latvian club FK Auda in the Latvian First League.
