= Kamil Mazek =

Polish footballer

Personal information
- Full name: Kamil Mazek
- Date of birth: 22 July 1994 (age 32)
- Place of birth: Warsaw, Poland
- Height: 1.74 m (5 ft 9 in)
- Position: Midfielder

Team information
- Current team: ŁKS Łowisko

Youth career
- –2013: Legia Warsaw

Senior career*
Years	Team	Apps	(Gls)
2013–2014	Legia Warsaw	0	(0)
2013–2014	→ Dolcan Ząbki (loan)	47	(2)
2015	Ruch Chorzów II	11	(4)
2015–2017	Ruch Chorzów	46	(3)
2017–2020	Zagłębie Lubin	16	(2)
2017–2019	Zagłębie Lubin II	20	(3)
2019	→ Stomil Olsztyn (loan)	4	(0)
2020–2021	Arka Gdynia	16	(1)
2021–2023	Chojniczanka Chojnice	56	(7)
2023–2025	Resovia	40	(1)
2025–2026	KS Wiązownica	25	(3)
2026–	ŁKS Łowisko	0	(0)

International career
2015–2016	Poland U21	9	(1)
- * Club domestic league appearances and goals

Kamil Mazek (born 22 July 1994) is a Polish professional footballer who plays as a midfielder for regional league club ŁKS Łowisko.

== Club career ==
=== Dolcan Ząbki ===
On 20 July 2013, Mazek was loaned from Legia Warsaw to I liga club Dolcan Ząbki. He spent in Ząbki one and a half years and played almost 50 games.

=== Ruch Chorzów ===
On 23 January 2015, Mazek signed two-and-a-half-year contract with Ekstraklasa side Ruch Chorzów. He debuted in the Ekstraklasa on 18 July 2015.

=== Zagłębie Lubin ===
On 28 February 2017, he moved to Zagłębie Lubin on a three-and-a-half-year deal.

=== Arka Gdynia ===
On 21 July 2020, Mazek joined Arka Gdynia on a two-year contract.

== Career statistics ==
As of match played 13 June 2026

Appearances and goals by club, season and competition
Club	Season	League			Polish Cup		Europe		Total	
Club	Season	Division	Apps	Goals	Apps	Goals	Apps	Goals	Apps	Goals
Dolcan Ząbki (loan)	2013–14	I liga	29	0	0	0	—		29	0
Dolcan Ząbki (loan)	2014–15	I liga	18	2	0	0	—		18	2
Dolcan Ząbki (loan)	Total		47	2	0	0	—		47	2
Ruch Chorzów II	2014–15	III liga, gr. F	11	4	—		—		11	4
Ruch Chorzów	2015–16	Ekstraklasa	28	3	2	0	—		30	3
Ruch Chorzów	2016–17	Ekstraklasa	18	0	1	0	—		19	0
Ruch Chorzów	Total		46	3	3	0	—		49	3
Zagłębie Lubin	2016–17	Ekstraklasa	10	1	—		—		10	1
Zagłębie Lubin	2017–18	Ekstraklasa	5	1	—		—		5	1
Zagłębie Lubin	2019–20	Ekstraklasa	1	0	0	0	—		1	0
Zagłębie Lubin	Total		16	2	0	0	—		16	2
Zagłębie Lubin II	2016–17	IV liga Low. Sil.	2	0	—		—		2	0
Zagłębie Lubin II	2017–18	III liga, gr. III	6	1	—		—		6	1
Zagłębie Lubin II	2018–19	III liga, gr. III	6	0	—		—		6	0
Zagłębie Lubin II	2019–20	III liga, gr. III	6	2	—		—		6	2
Zagłębie Lubin II	Total		20	3	—		—		20	3
Stomil Olsztyn (loan)	2018–19	I liga	4	0	—		—		4	0
Arka Gdynia	2020–21	I liga	16	1	3	1	—		19	2
Chojniczanka Chojnice	2021–22	II liga	26	3	1	0	—		27	3
Chojniczanka Chojnice	2022–23	I liga	30	4	2	0	—		32	4
Chojniczanka Chojnice	Total		56	7	3	0	—		59	7
Resovia	2023–24	I liga	30	1	2	0	—		32	1
Resovia	2024–25	II liga	10	0	1	0	—		11	0
Resovia	Total		40	1	3	0	—		43	1
KS Wiązownica	2025–26	IV liga Subcarpathia	25	3	—		—		25	3
ŁKS Łowisko	2026–27	Regional league	0	0	—		—		0	0
Career total			281	26	12	1	—		293	27

== Honours ==
Zagłębie Lubin II

- IV liga Lower Silesia West: 2016–17
