= Adam Setla =

Polish footballer

Personal information
- Date of birth: 26 October 1992 (age 34)
- Place of birth: Niemodlin, Poland
- Height: 1.83 m (6 ft 0 in)
- Position: Striker

Team information
- Current team: LZS Starowice Dolne

Youth career
- Góral Sidzina

Senior career*
Years	Team	Apps	(Gls)
–2009	Góral Sidzina		
2009–2010	Czarni Otmuchów		
2011–2013	Odra Opole	65	(22)
2014–2015	Nadwiślan Góra	46	(20)
2015–2016	Ruch Chorzów	1	(0)
2015–2016	Ruch Chorzów II	13	(4)
2016	MKS Kluczbork	10	(0)
2017	TSV Kornburg		
2017	Ruch Chorzów	5	(0)
2018	Gwardia Koszalin	13	(4)
2018	GKS Bełchatów	10	(0)
2019–2021	Polonia Nysa	60	(48)
2021–2024	LZS Starowice Dolne	71	(52)
2024–2025	Warta Gorzów Wielkopolski	16	(1)
2025–2026	LZS Starowice Dolne	27	(17)
2026	LZS Domaszkowice	12	(4)
2026–	LZS Starowice Dolne	0	(0)
- * Club domestic league appearances and goals as of 17:15, 15 September 2026 (UTC)

Adam Setla (born 26 October 1992) is a Polish professional footballer who plays as a striker for IV liga Opole club LZS Starowice Dolne.

== Career ==
Setla started his career with Polish seventh division side Góral Sidzina. In 2009, he signed for Czarni Otmuchów in the Polish sixth division. Before the second half of 2010–11, Setla signed for Polish fourth division club Odra Opole, helping them earn promotion to the Polish third division. In 2015, he signed for Ruch Chorzów in the Polish top flight, where he made 1 league appearance and scored 0 goals. On 13 September 2015, Setla debuted for Ruch Chorzów during a 1–0 win over Górnik Zabrze. In 2016, he signed for Polish second division team MKS Kluczbork.

Before the second half of 2016–17, he signed for TSV Kornburg in the German sixth division. In 2017, Setla returned to Polish second division outfit Ruch Chorzów. Before the second half of 2017–18, he signed for Gwardia Koszalin in the Polish third division. Before the second half of 2018–19, he signed for Polish fifth division side Polonia Nysa, helping them earn promotion to the Polish fourth division.

== Honours ==
Odra Opole

- III liga Opole–Silesia: 2012–13
- Polish Cup (Opole regionals): 2012–13

Nadwiślan Góra

- III liga Opole–Silesia: 2013–14

Polonia Nysa

- IV liga Opole: 2019–20
- Polish Cup (Opole regionals): 2019–20

LZS Starowice Dolne

- IV liga Opole: 2022–23, 2024–25
