= Kamil Sylwestrzak =

Polish footballer

Personal information
- Full name: Kamil Sylwestrzak
- Date of birth: 16 July 1988 (age 38)
- Place of birth: Slubice, Poland
- Height: 1.88 m (6 ft 2 in)
- Position: Left-back

Youth career
- Odra Górzyca
- Polonia Słubice
- 2003: Celuloza Kostrzyn
- 2004: Odra Górzyca
- 2005: UKP Zielona Góra
- 2005: Odra Górzyca
- 2005–2007: Polonia Słubice

Senior career*
Years	Team	Apps	(Gls)
2007	Polonia Słubice	2	(0)
2008	Mieszko Gniezno	10	(2)
2008–2011	Ilanka Rzepin	53	(4)
2008	→ Celuloza Kostrzyn (loan)	0	(0)
2011–2012	Chrobry Głogów	23	(3)
2012	Chojniczanka Chojnice	17	(0)
2013–2016	Korona Kielce	97	(11)
2016–2018	Wisła Płock	22	(3)
2018–2020	Chojniczanka Chojnice	36	(1)
2020–2021	KP Starogard Gdański	19	(0)
2021	Borowiak Czersk	11	(0)
2023	Korona Kielce II	11	(1)
2023	Moravia Morawica	4	(0)
Total		305	(25)
- * Club domestic league appearances and goals

Kamil Sylwestrzak (born 16 July 1988) is a Polish former professional footballer who played as a left-back.

== Club career ==
On 26 April 2013, Sylwestrzak made his Ekstraklasa debut for Korona Kielce in a match against Pogoń Szczecin.

On 25 September 2020, he joined KP Starogard Gdański.
