= Patrick Dytko =

Polish footballer

Personal information
- Full name: Patrick Dytko
- Date of birth: 28 March 1994 (age 32)
- Place of birth: Völklingen, Germany
- Height: 1.78 m (5 ft 10 in)
- Position: Left winger

Team information
- Current team: SC Obersprockhövel
- Number: 27

Youth career
- –2005: SV 08 Ludweiler- Warndt
- 2005–2010: 1. FC Saarbrücken
- 2010–2013: Borussia Dortmund

Senior career*
Years	Team	Apps	(Gls)
2013–2016	Piast Gliwice	10	(0)
2013–2016	Piast Gliwice II	47	(8)
2016–2017	SSVg Velbert	29	(8)
2017–2020	TSG Sprockhövel	61	(13)
2020–	SC Obersprockhövel	110	(37)

International career
2010	Poland U17	4	(0)
2012	Poland U18	1	(0)
2013	Poland U20	6	(0)
- * Club domestic league appearances and goals as of 21:20, 1 June 2026 (UTC)

Patrick Dytko (born 28 March 1994 in Völklingen) is a professional footballer who plays as a left winger for SC Obersprockhövel. Born in Germany, he represented Poland at youth level.

== Career ==
On 14 July 2016 he signed a contract with SSVg Velbert.

=== National team ===
He was a part of several Poland youth national teams, including the under-20s in 2013.

== Personal life ==
His parents emigrated in 1989 from Poland (near to Katowice) to Völklingen, Germany. In 2010, he moved to Dortmund and finally in 2013 to Gliwice, Poland. He holds both Polish and German citizenships.
