= Marcin Kalkowski =

Polish footballer

Personal information
- Date of birth: 6 November 1989 (age 37)
- Place of birth: Gdańsk, Poland
- Height: 1.86 m (6 ft 1 in)
- Position: Centre-back

Youth career
- –2003: Gryf Wejherowo
- 2003–2005: Bałtyk Gdynia
- 2005–2007: UKS SMS Bałucz

Senior career*
Years	Team	Apps	(Gls)
2007–2008	UKS SMS Łódź	16	(0)
2008–2010	GKS Bełchatów	0	(0)
2010	Arka Gdynia	0	(0)
2010–2011	Jeziorak Iława	40	(4)
2012–2016	Górnik Łęczna	54	(1)
2016–2017	Gryf Wejherowo	0	(0)
Total		110	(5)
- * Club domestic league appearances and goals

Marcin Kalkowski (born 6 November 1989) is a Polish former professional footballer who played as a centre-back.
