= Konrad Handzlik =

Polish footballer

Personal information
- Full name: Konrad Handzlik
- Date of birth: 13 February 1998 (age 28)
- Place of birth: Wadowice, Poland
- Height: 1.68 m (5 ft 6 in)
- Position: Midfielder

Team information
- Current team: Cartusia Kartuzy
- Number: 20

Youth career
- –2014: Wisła Kraków

Senior career*
Years	Team	Apps	(Gls)
2014–2016	Wisła Kraków II	33	(6)
2015–2016	Wisła Kraków	1	(0)
2016	→ Zagłębie Sosnowiec (loan)	1	(0)
2016–2017	Legia Warsaw II	4	(0)
2017–2020	Olimpia Grudziądz	65	(4)
2020–2021	Warta Poznań	3	(0)
2021–2022	GKS Jastrzębie	31	(2)
2022–2023	Garbarnia Kraków	24	(1)
2023–2024	Star Starachowice	28	(3)
2024–2025	Podlasie Biała Podlaska	12	(0)
2025–	Cartusia Kartuzy	44	(1)

International career
2015–2016	Poland U18	5	(1)
2016	Poland U19	10	(1)
- * Club domestic league appearances and goals as of 17:53, 5 June 2026 (UTC)

Konrad Handzlik (born 13 February 1998) is a Polish professional footballer who plays as a midfielder for IV liga Pomerania club Cartusia Kartuzy.

== Career ==
At the age of 17, Handzlik debuted for Wisła Kraków in the Polish top flight.

In 2016, he signed for the reserves of Legia Warsaw.

In 2020, he signed for Polish top flight side Warta Poznań from Olimpia Grudziądz in the second division.

== Honours ==
Star Starachowice

- Polish Cup (Świętokrzyskie regionals): 2023–24
