= Dariusz Jarecki =

Polish footballer (born 1981)

Personal information
- Full name: Dariusz Jarecki
- Date of birth: 23 March 1981 (age 45)
- Place of birth: Barlinek, Poland
- Height: 1.84 m (6 ft 1/2 in)
- Position: Left-back

Team information
- Current team: Wisłok Strzyżów

Youth career
- Osadnik Myślibórz
- Lech Poznań

Senior career*
Years	Team	Apps	(Gls)
1998–1999	Olimpia Poznań		
1999	Polonia Słubice		
2000–2002	Osadnik Myślibórz		
2002–2003	Błękitni Stargard Szczeciński	10	(0)
2004	Pogoń Skwierzyna		
2004–2006	Polonia Słubice		
2006–2007	Górnik Łęczna	23	(1)
2007–2010	Jagiellonia Białystok	69	(3)
2010–2011	Polonia Bytom	24	(5)
2011–2016	Termalica Nieciecza	124	(10)
2016–2018	Górnik Łęczna	28	(1)
2018–2020	Stal Rzeszów	43	(2)
2020–2022	Stal Rzeszów II	56	(74)
2022–2025	LKS Jasionka	65	(45)
2025–	Wisłok Strzyżów	0	(0)
- * Club domestic league appearances and goals as of 12:00, 19 August 2025 (UTC)

Dariusz Jarecki (born 23 March 1981) is a Polish professional footballer who plays as a left-back for Klasa A club Wisłok Strzyżów.

== Career ==
In June 2011, he joined LKS Nieciecza.

== Honours ==
Jagiellonia Białystok

- Polish Cup: 2009–10

Stal Rzeszów

- III liga, group IV: 2018–19
- Polish Cup (Subcarpathia regionals): 2018–19
- Polish Cup (Rzeszów-Dębica regionals): 2018–19

Stal Rzeszów II

- Regional league Rzeszów: 2021–22

LKS Jasionka

- Klasa A Rzeszów I: 2022–23
