= Jarosław Popiela =

Polish footballer

Personal information
- Date of birth: 14 May 1974 (age 52)
- Place of birth: Tarnów, Poland
- Height: 1.90 m (6 ft 3 in)
- Position: Defender

Senior career*
Years	Team	Apps	(Gls)
1998–1999	Unia Tarnów		
1999	Petrochemia Płock		
1999–2000	KSZO Ostrowiec Świętokrzyski		
2000–2001	Orlen Płock	24	(2)
2001–2003	KSZO Ostrowiec Świętokrzyski	40	(7)
2003	Zagłębie Lubin	6	(0)
2003–2006	Górnik Zabrze	64	(7)
2006	APOEL	12	(0)
2006–2008	Ethnikos Piraeus	58	(6)
2008–2009	Fostiras		
2009–2010	Korinthos		
2014–2015	Grom Lipowo		
- * Club domestic league appearances and goals

Jarosław Popiela (born 17 May 1974) is a Polish former professional footballer who played as a defender.

== Career ==
Born in Tarnów, Popiela played for Unia Tarnów, Petrochemia Płock, KSZO Ostrowiec Świętokrzyski, Orlen Płock, Zagłębie Lubin, Górnik Zabrze, APOEL, Ethnikos Piraeus, Fostiras, P.A.S. Korinthos and Grom Lipowo.

== Personal life ==
He is the brother of Łukasz Popiela and father of Krystian Popiela.

== Honours ==
APOEL

- Cypriot Cup: 2005–06
