= Krzysztof Pilarz =

Polish footballer (born 1980)

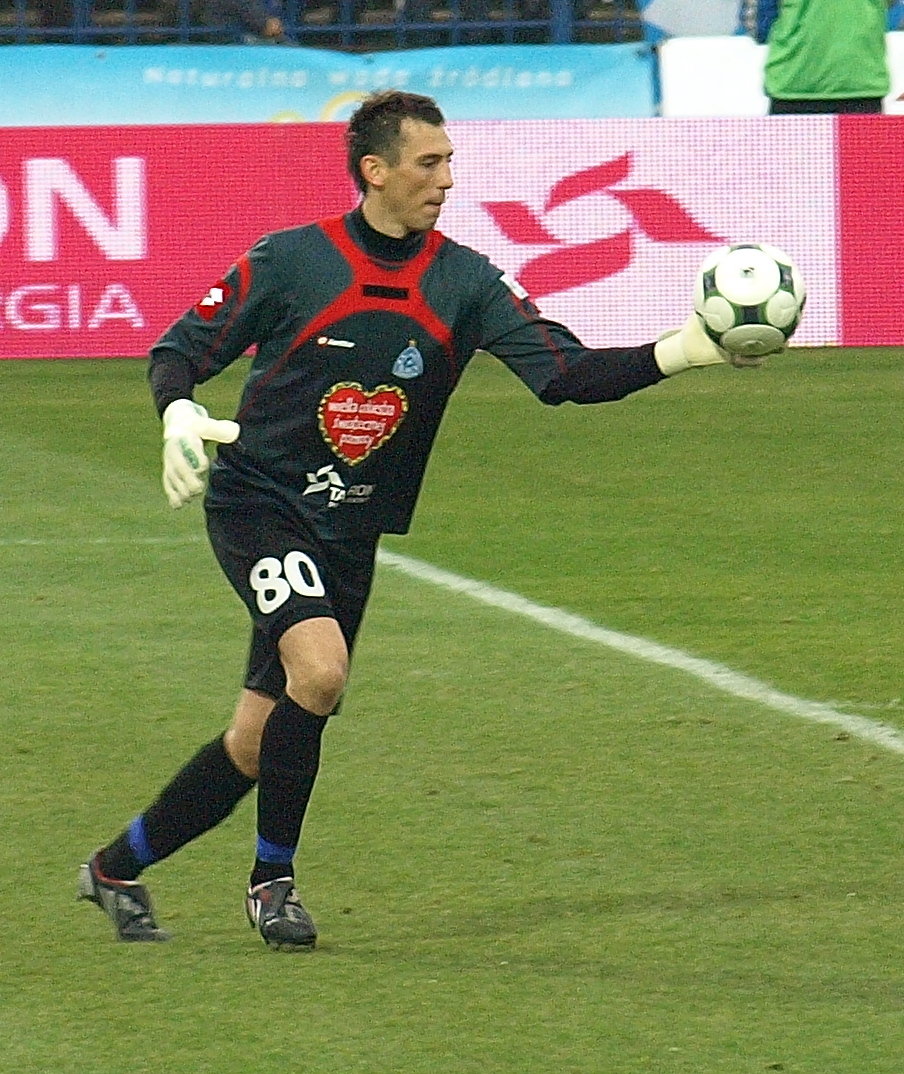
- Pilarz with Ruch Chorzów in 2009

Personal information
- Date of birth: 9 November 1980 (age 46)
- Place of birth: Nowy Dwór Gdański, Poland
- Height: 1.84 m (6 ft 0 in)
- Position: Goalkeeper

Team information
- Current team: Grom Nowy Staw (goalkeeping coach)

Youth career
- Żuławy Nowy Dwór Gdański

Senior career*
Years	Team	Apps	(Gls)
1999	Jeziorak Iława		
2000–2001	Lechia-Polonia Gdańsk	70	(0)
2002–2003	RKS Radomsko	21	(0)
2003–2004	Pogoń Szczecin	14	(0)
2005	GKS Bełchatów	6	(0)
2006–2007	Odra Wodzisław	43	(0)
2008–2010	Ruch Chorzów	67	(0)
2010–2013	Korona Kielce	4	(0)
2012–2013	→ Cracovia (loan)	33	(0)
2013–2015	Cracovia	80	(0)
2016–2017	Bruk-Bet Termalica Nieciecza	36	(0)
2017–2018	Arka Gdynia	0	(0)
2018–2019	Olimpia Elbląg	5	(0)
2019	RKS Radomsko	10	(0)
2020	Żuławy Nowy Dwór Gdański	0	(0)
2023–2024	Powiśle Dzierzgoń	47	(0)
- * Club domestic league appearances and goals

Krzysztof Pilarz (born 9 November 1980) is a Polish former professional footballer who played as a goalkeeper. He currently serves as the goalkeeping coach of III liga club Grom Nowy Staw.

In 2004, Pilarz scored a penalty for Pogoń Szczecin in an 8–1 win over Mazowsze Grójec in the Polish Cup.

== Honours ==
Pogoń Szczecin

- II liga: 2003–04

RKS Radomsko

- IV liga Łódź: 2018–19
