= Damian Szpak =

Polish footballer

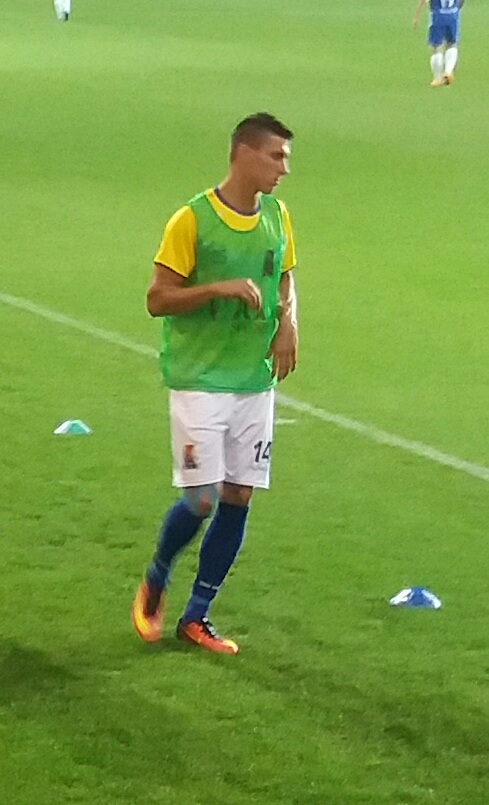
- Szpak with Motor Lublin in 2016

Personal information
- Date of birth: 22 September 1993 (age 33)
- Place of birth: Lublin, Poland
- Height: 1.86 m (6 ft 1 in)
- Position: Forward

Youth career
- Sygnał Lublin

Senior career*
Years	Team	Apps	(Gls)
2010–2011	Sygnał Lublin		
2011–2013	Motor Lublin	42	(11)
2013–2016	Górnik Łęczna	6	(1)
2015–2016	→ Orlęta Radzyń Podlaski (loan)	30	(26)
2016	→ Motor Lublin (loan)	9	(3)
2017	Radomiak Radom	2	(0)
2018	Avia Świdnik	13	(4)
2019	Chełmianka Chełm	16	(4)
2019–2021	Avia Świdnik	48	(7)
- * Club domestic league appearances and goals

Damian Szpak (born 22 September 1993) is a Polish former professional footballer who played as a forward.

== Career ==
Szpak started his playing career in Sygnał Lublin. In 2011, he joined Motor Lublin, and he made his professional debut on 14 September 2011 in a 1–1 home draw against Garbarnia Kraków, coming on as a substitute in the 73rd minute. In July 2013, he signed four-year contract with Bogdanka Łęczna. Ahead of the 2015/16 season he moved on loan to Orlęta Radzyń Podlaski. He played 30 league games for Orlęta and scored 26 goals for them.

On 23 August 2016, he joined Motor Lublin on a season-long loan. On 11 January 2017, Szpak signed for II liga side Radomiak Radom. On 9 February 2018, he moved to Avia Świdnik. He left the club again at the end of 2018.

On 1 February 2019, Szpak joined Chełmianka Chełm.
