= Michał Przybyła =

Polish footballer

Personal information
- Date of birth: 1 July 1994 (age 32)
- Place of birth: Busko-Zdrój, Poland
- Height: 1.77 m (5 ft 10 in)
- Position: Forward

Youth career
- –2010: Zdrój Busko Zdrój
- 2010–2013: Korona Kielce

Senior career*
Years	Team	Apps	(Gls)
2013–2015	Korona Kielce II	31	(14)
2013–2017	Korona Kielce	36	(5)
2014	→ Widzew Łódź (loan)	1	(0)
2017	→ Chojniczanka (loan)	3	(0)
2017–2018	Warta Poznań	20	(3)
2018–2019	Kotwica Kołobrzeg	7	(1)
2019	Stilon Gorzów	8	(3)
2019–2020	Warta Gorzów	13	(3)
2020–2021	Unia Swarzędz	21	(4)
2021	Budowlani Murzynowo	3	(1)
2022	AP Reissa Poznań	1	(0)
Total		144	(34)
- * Club domestic league appearances and goals

Michał Przybyła (born 1 July 1994) is a Polish former professional footballer who played as a forward.

== Career ==
On 28 September 2018, Przybyła joined Kotwica Kołobrzeg. On 12 March 2019, he moved to Stilon Gorzów Wielkopolski. Four months later, he left the club to join Warta Gorzów Wielkopolski ahead of the 2019–20 season.

== Honours ==
Warta Gorzów Wielkopolski

- IV liga Lubusz: 2019–20
