= Miłosz Przybecki =

Polish footballer

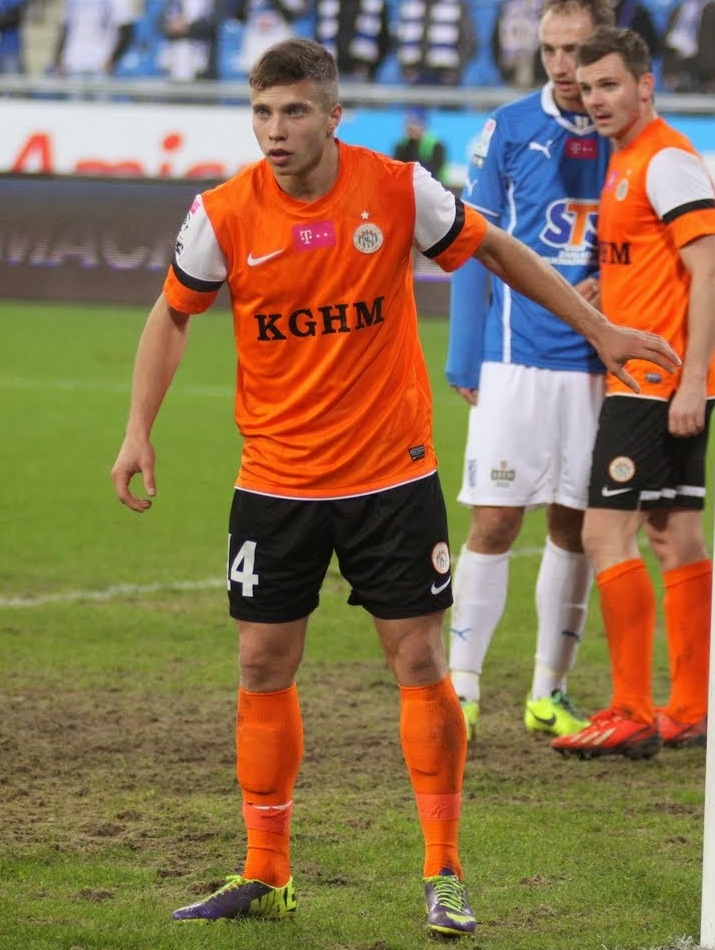
- Przybecki with Zagłębie Lubin in 2013

Personal information
- Full name: Miłosz Przybecki
- Date of birth: 2 January 1991 (age 35)
- Place of birth: Śrem, Poland
- Height: 1.76 m (5 ft 9 in)
- Position: Right winger

Team information
- Current team: Warta Śrem
- Number: 7

Youth career
- As Czempiń
- Helios Czempiń
- Promień Opalenica

Senior career*
| Years | Team | Apps | (Gls) |
| 2009 | → Sokół Pniewy (loan) | 15 | (4) |
| 2010 | → Ruch Radzionków (loan) | 7 | (2) |
| 2010–2011 | Ruch Radzionków | 33 | (5) |
| 2011–2013 | Polonia Warsaw | 18 | (3) |
| 2012 | → Korona Kielce (loan) | 0 | (0) |
| 2013–2015 | Zagłębie Lubin | 46 | (10) |
| 2015–2016 | Pogoń Szczecin | 30 | (1) |
| 2016–2018 | Ruch Chorzów | 51 | (4) |
| 2018–2020 | Chojniczanka Chojnice | 21 | (1) |
| 2020 | Resovia Rzeszów | 2 | (0) |
| 2020–2022 | Pogoń Siedlce | 58 | (9) |
| 2022–2023 | KFK Kópavogur | 3 | (4) |
| 2023 | Szturm Junikowo Poznań | 7 | (9) |
| 2023–2024 | Mazovia Mińsk Mazowiecki | 33 | (8) |
| 2024– | Warta Śrem | 33 | (4) |

International career
| 2011 | Poland U20 | 2 | (1) |
| 2011 | Poland U21 | 4 | (1) |
- * Club domestic league appearances and goals as of 22:10, 23 June 2025 (UTC)

Miłosz Przybecki (born 2 January 1991) is a Polish professional footballer who plays as a right winger for V liga Greater Poland club Warta Śrem.

== Career ==
In February 2010, Przybecki was loaned to Ruch Radzionków from Promień Opalenica for a half-year deal. In July 2010, he was sold to Ruch Radzionków and signed a three-year contract.

In July 2011, he joined Polonia Warsaw on a three-year contract and in January 2012, moved on a loan deal to Korona Kielce

On 23 October 2020, Przybecki joined Pogoń Siedlce on a one-season contract.

On 23 July 2022, he moved to Iceland to join the fifth division side KFK Kópavogur.

On 17 March 2023, he returned to Poland to join regional league side Szturm Junikowo Poznań.

== Honours ==
Ruch Radzionków

- II liga West: 2009–10

Zagłębie Lubin

- I liga: 2014–15

Szturm Junikowo

- Regional league Greater Poland II: 2022–23

Mazovia Mińsk Mazowiecki

- Polish Cup (Siedlce regionals): 2023–24
