= Jakub Kuzdra =

Polish footballer

Personal information
- Full name: Jakub Kuzdra
- Date of birth: 8 December 1997 (age 28)
- Place of birth: Tarnów, Poland
- Height: 1.78 m (5 ft 10 in)
- Position: Full-back

Team information
- Current team: Chełmianka Chełm
- Number: 13

Youth career
- Jutrzenka Wierzchosławice
- 2008–2014: Unia Tarnów

Senior career*
Years	Team	Apps	(Gls)
2014–2015	Unia Tarnów	42	(0)
2015–2016	Piast Gliwice	1	(0)
2015–2016	Piast Gliwice II	19	(0)
2016–2017	→ Polonia Bytom (loan)	15	(0)
2017–2019	Bytovia Bytów	47	(1)
2019–2021	Warta Poznań	34	(1)
2021	Volos	0	(0)
2022–2026	Chrobry Głogów	79	(0)
2026–	Chełmianka Chełm	12	(4)

International career
2015	Poland U18	3	(0)
2015–2016	Poland U19	8	(2)
- * Club domestic league appearances and goals as of 17:06, 4 June 2026 (UTC)

Jakub Kuzdra (born 8 December 1997) is a Polish professional footballer who plays as a full-back for III liga club Chełmianka Chełm.

== Club career ==
=== Volos ===
On 10 July 2021, Greek Super League club Volos announced the signing of Kuzdra, who was released from Warta Poznań. He made a single cup appearance before terminating his contract by mutual consent on 15 December 2021.

=== Chrobry Głogów ===
On 10 June 2022, Kuzdra joined I liga side Chrobry Głogów on a two-year deal.

=== Chełmianka Chełm ===
On 9 January 2026, Kuzdra signed for fourth-tier side Chełmianka Chełm until June 2027.
