= Krzysztof Szewczyk =

Polish footballer (born 1996)

Personal information
- Full name: Krzysztof Szewczyk
- Date of birth: 6 March 1996 (age 30)
- Place of birth: Bochnia, Poland
- Height: 1.77 m (5 ft 9 1/2 in)
- Position: Forward

Team information
- Current team: Wieczysta Kraków II
- Number: 32

Youth career
- –2010: Orzeł Cikowice
- 2010–2011: Krakus Nowa Huta
- 2011–2012: Cracovia

Senior career*
Years	Team	Apps	(Gls)
2012–2018	Cracovia	6	(0)
2016–2017	→ Stomil Olsztyn (loan)	20	(3)
2017–2018	→ Puszcza Niepołomice (loan)	18	(1)
2018–2019	Wiślanie Jaśkowice	32	(14)
2019–2020	Garbarnia Kraków	33	(7)
2020–2023	Wieczysta Kraków	40	(35)
2021–	Wieczysta Kraków II	87	(35)

International career
2012–2013	Poland U17	4	(0)
- * Club domestic league appearances and goals as of 22:25, 25 June 2026 (UTC)

Krzysztof Szewczyk (born 6 March 1996) is a Polish professional footballer who plays as a forward for III liga club Wieczysta Kraków II.

== Honours ==
Wieczysta Kraków

- IV liga Lesser Poland West: 2021–22 (West), 2025–26
- Regional league Kraków II: 2020–21
- Polish Cup (Lesser Poland regionals): 2020–21, 2022–23
- Polish Cup (Kraków District regionals): 2020–21

Wieczysta Kraków II

- V liga Lesser Poland West: 2023–24
- Regional league Kraków II: 2022–23
- Klasa A Kraków III: 2021–22
