= Krystian Miś =

Polish footballer

Personal information
- Date of birth: 12 April 1996 (age 30)
- Place of birth: Syców, Poland
- Height: 1.82 m (6 ft 0 in)
- Position: Left-back

Team information
- Current team: Pogoń Siedlce
- Number: 2

Youth career
- –2012: Pogoń Syców
- 2012: Płomień Opatów
- 2013: Śląsk Wrocław

Senior career*
Years	Team	Apps	(Gls)
2013–2016	Śląsk Wrocław II	50	(3)
2016	→ Legionovia Legionowo (loan)	13	(0)
2016–2018	Korona Kielce	8	(0)
2017	→ Legionovia Legionowo (loan)	15	(2)
2018–2019	Wisła Płock	0	(0)
2019–2020	Piast Żmigród	14	(0)
2020–2022	Pogoń Siedlce	37	(2)
2022–	Pogoń Siedlce	87	(5)
- * Club domestic league appearances and goals as of 19:41, 26 May 2026 (UTC)

Krystian Miś (born 12 April 1996) is a Polish professional footballer who plays as a left-back for I liga club Pogoń Siedlce.

== Career ==
=== Piast Żmigród ===
On 23 August 2019 it was confirmed, that Miś had joined Polish club MKS Piast Żmigród.

=== Pogoń Siedlce ===
On 5 August 2020, he signed a two-year contract with Pogoń Siedlce. After being a free agent for two months, on 1 September 2022 he rejoined Pogoń on a one-year deal.

== Honours ==
Pogoń Siedlce

- II liga: 2023–24
