= Rafał Leszczyński (footballer) =

Polish footballer

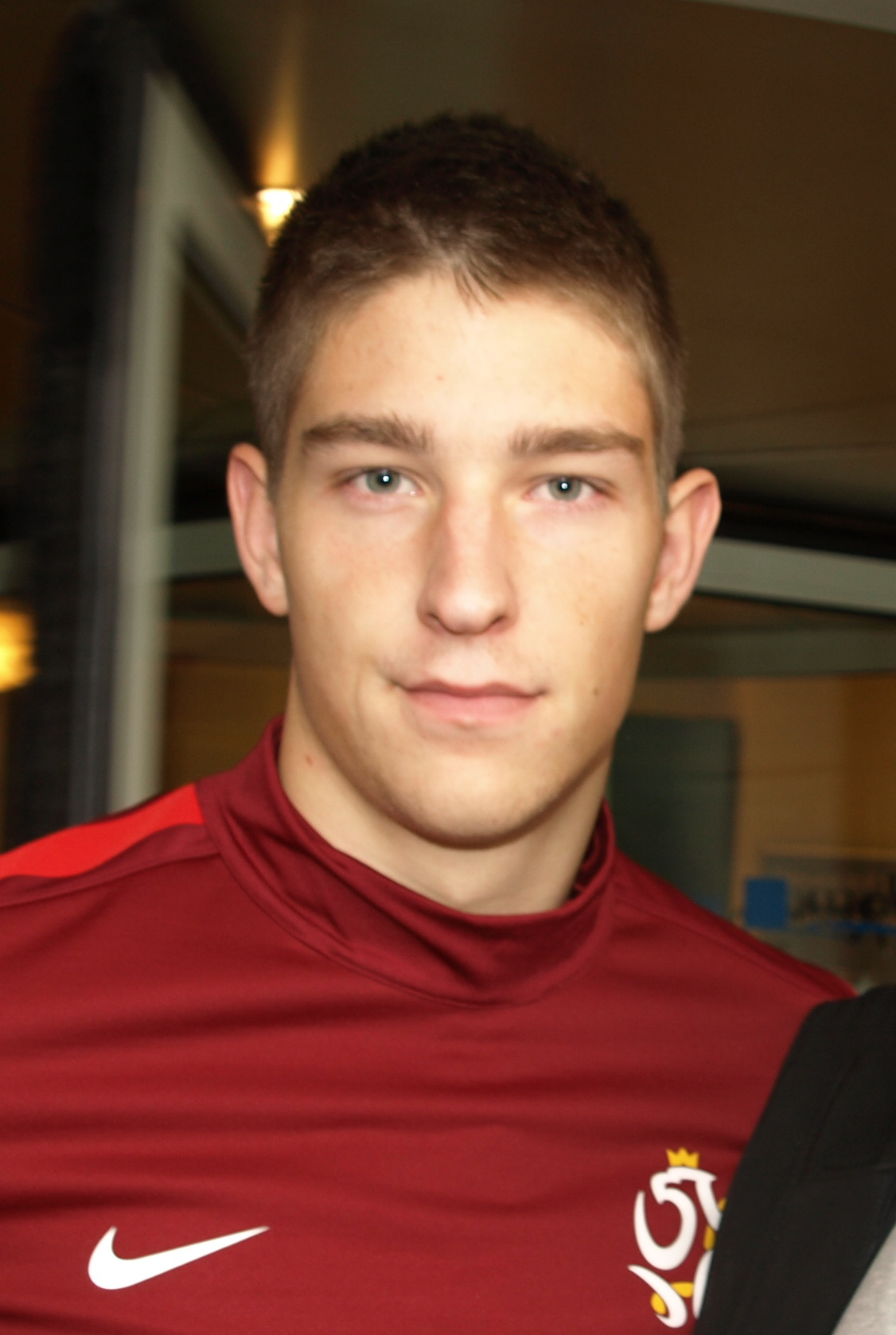
- Leszczyński in 2013

Personal information
- Full name: Rafał Leszczyński
- Date of birth: 26 April 1992 (age 34)
- Place of birth: Warsaw, Poland
- Height: 1.87 m (6 ft 1 1/2 in)
- Position: Goalkeeper

Team information
- Current team: Wisła Płock
- Number: 12

Youth career
- –2008: Olimpia Warsaw
- 2008–2009: KS Raszyn

Senior career*
Years	Team	Apps	(Gls)
2009–2015	Dolcan Ząbki	103	(0)
2015–2017	Piast Gliwice	0	(0)
2016–2017	→ Podbeskidzie (loan)	31	(0)
2017–2021	Podbeskidzie	48	(0)
2021–2022	Chrobry Głogów	51	(0)
2022–2025	Śląsk Wrocław	86	(0)
2022	Śląsk Wrocław II	1	(0)
2025–	Wisła Płock	33	(0)

International career
2013	Poland U20	1	(0)
2014	Poland U21	1	(0)
2014	Poland	1	(0)
- * Club domestic league appearances and goals as of 17:58, 29 May 2026 (UTC)

Rafał Leszczyński (born 26 April 1992) is a Polish professional footballer who plays as a goalkeeper for Ekstraklasa club Wisła Płock.

== Career statistics ==
=== International ===
Appearances and goals by national team and year
National team	Year	Apps	Goals
Poland
Poland	2014	1	0
Total		1	0

== Honours ==
Individual

- I liga Player of the Year: 2013
- I liga Player of the Month: March 2022
