= Adam Wilk (footballer) =

Polish footballer (born 1997)

Personal information
- Date of birth: 21 November 1997 (age 28)
- Place of birth: Kraków, Poland
- Height: 1.96 m (6 ft 5 in)
- Position: Goalkeeper

Team information
- Current team: Chełmianka Chełm
- Number: 30

Youth career
- –2014: Cracovia

Senior career*
Years	Team	Apps	(Gls)
2014–2023	Cracovia II	71+	(0)
2017–2024	Cracovia	11	(0)
2017	→ Legionovia Legionowo (loan)	14	(0)
2018–2019	→ Ruch Chorzów (loan)	0	(0)
2023	→ Hutnik Kraków (loan)	15	(0)
2024–2025	Stal Stalowa Wola	15	(0)
2025–	Chełmianka Chełm	33	(0)

International career
2018	Poland U20	1	(0)
- * Club domestic league appearances and goals as of 09:41, 5 June 2026 (UTC)

Adam Wilk (born 21 November 1997) is a Polish professional footballer who plays as a goalkeeper for III liga club Chełmianka Chełm.

== Club career ==
Wilk was born in Kraków and started his career at Cracovia. In February 2017, he joined Legionovia Legionowo on loan until the end of the season, and made 14 league appearances for the club. On 15 July 2017, Wilk made his debut for Cracovia in a 1–1 draw at home to Piast Gliwice, before going on to make a further 10 appearances that season. In August 2018, Wilk joined Ruch Chorzów on loan, before returning to Cracovia in January 2019, having made just one appearance for the club.

In June 2019, he signed a contract with the club lasting until the summer of 2021.

On 23 December 2022, having not made a single appearance for Cracovia's senior team since his return from Ruch, he was loaned until the end of the season to third division side Hutnik Kraków beginning on 1 January 2023.

His over-a-decade-long stay with Cracovia came to an end in June 2024, when it was announced he would leave the club at the end of the month. On 1 July, he signed with I liga club Stal Stalowa Wola.

On 3 June 2025, Wilk joined III liga club Chełmianka Chełm on a one-year contract, with an option for another year.

== International career ==
Wilk appeared once for the Poland national under-20 football team in 2018.

== Honours ==
Cracovia II

- IV liga Lesser Poland West: 2014–15, 2019–20
