= Dawid Nowak =

Polish footballer (born 1984)

Personal information
- Full name: Dawid Nowak
- Date of birth: 30 November 1984 (age 41)
- Place of birth: Hrubieszów, Poland
- Height: 1.78 m (5 ft 10 in)
- Position: Forward

Team information
- Current team: Pogoń Szczecin (assistant)

Youth career
- Unia Hrubieszów

Senior career*
Years	Team	Apps	(Gls)
2002–2003	UKS SMS Łódź		
2003–2005	Zdrój Ciechocinek		
2004–2005	→ Toruński KP (loan)		
2006–2013	GKS Bełchatów	134	(41)
2013–2014	Cracovia	35	(9)
2016–2017	Termalica Nieciecza	17	(2)
2017–2018	Puszcza Niepołomice	18	(0)
2018–2019	Garbarnia Kraków	24	(1)

International career
2008–2010	Poland	8	(0)
- * Club domestic league appearances and goals

Dawid Nowak (born 30 November 1984) is a Polish former professional footballer who played as a forward. He is currently the assistant coach of Ekstraklasa club Pogoń Szczecin.

== Honours ==
Individual

- Ekstraklasa Cup top scorer: 2006–07
