= Krzysztof Baran (footballer, born 1990) =

Polish footballer

Personal information
- Full name: Krzysztof Baran
- Date of birth: 12 February 1990 (age 36)
- Place of birth: Tomaszów Mazowiecki, Poland
- Height: 1.95 m (6 ft 5 in)
- Position: Goalkeeper

Youth career
- Lechia Tomaszów Mazowiecki
- UKS SMS Łódź
- –2007: KKS Koluszki
- 2008: Pogoń Łask Kolumna

Senior career*
Years	Team	Apps	(Gls)
2008–2010	UKS SMS Łódź	55	(0)
2010–2011	Chojniczanka Chojnice	33	(0)
2011–2016	Jagiellonia Białystok	32	(0)
2011–2016	Jagiellonia Białystok II	24	(0)
2012	→ Ruch Radzionków (loan)	1	(0)
2013	→ Podbeskidzie (loan)	0	(0)
2016–2018	Termalica Nieciecza	1	(0)
2018–2019	GKS Katowice	14	(0)
2019–2020	Sandecja Nowy Sącz	1	(0)
2020–2021	Kjellerup IF	2	(0)
2021–2025	Lechia Tomaszów Mazowiecki	34	(0)
Total		197	(0)
- * Club domestic league appearances and goals

Krzysztof Baran (born 12 February 1990) is a Polish former professional footballer who played as a goalkeeper. He most recently served as a goalkeeping coach and academy coordinator at III liga club Lechia Tomaszów Mazowiecki.

== Club career ==
On 9 October 2020, he joined fourth-tier Danish club Kjellerup IF.

== Honours ==
Individual

- Ekstraklasa Save of the Season: 2013–14
