= Wojciech Małecki =

Polish footballer

Personal information
- Date of birth: 11 October 1990 (age 36)
- Place of birth: Elbląg, Poland
- Height: 1.88 m (6 ft 2 in)
- Position: Goalkeeper

Youth career
- Olimpia Warsaw
- Korona Kielce

Senior career*
Years	Team	Apps	(Gls)
2008–2015	Korona Kielce II	33	(0)
2008–2015	Korona Kielce	11	(0)
2010–2011	→ Znicz Pruszków (loan)	19	(0)
2015–2016	Kotwica Kołobrzeg	32	(0)
2016–2017	Górnik Łęczna	12	(0)
2017–2018	Olimpia Grudziądz	31	(0)
2018–2019	Weszło Warsaw	5	(0)
Total		143	(0)
- * Club domestic league appearances and goals

Wojciech Małecki (born 11 October 1990) is a Polish former professional footballer who played as a goalkeeper.

He retired from professional football in 2018 to focus on his goalkeeper glove manufacturing company Football Masters.

== Honours ==
Weszło Warsaw

- Klasa B Warsaw III: 2018–19
