= Jakub Wrąbel =

Polish footballer

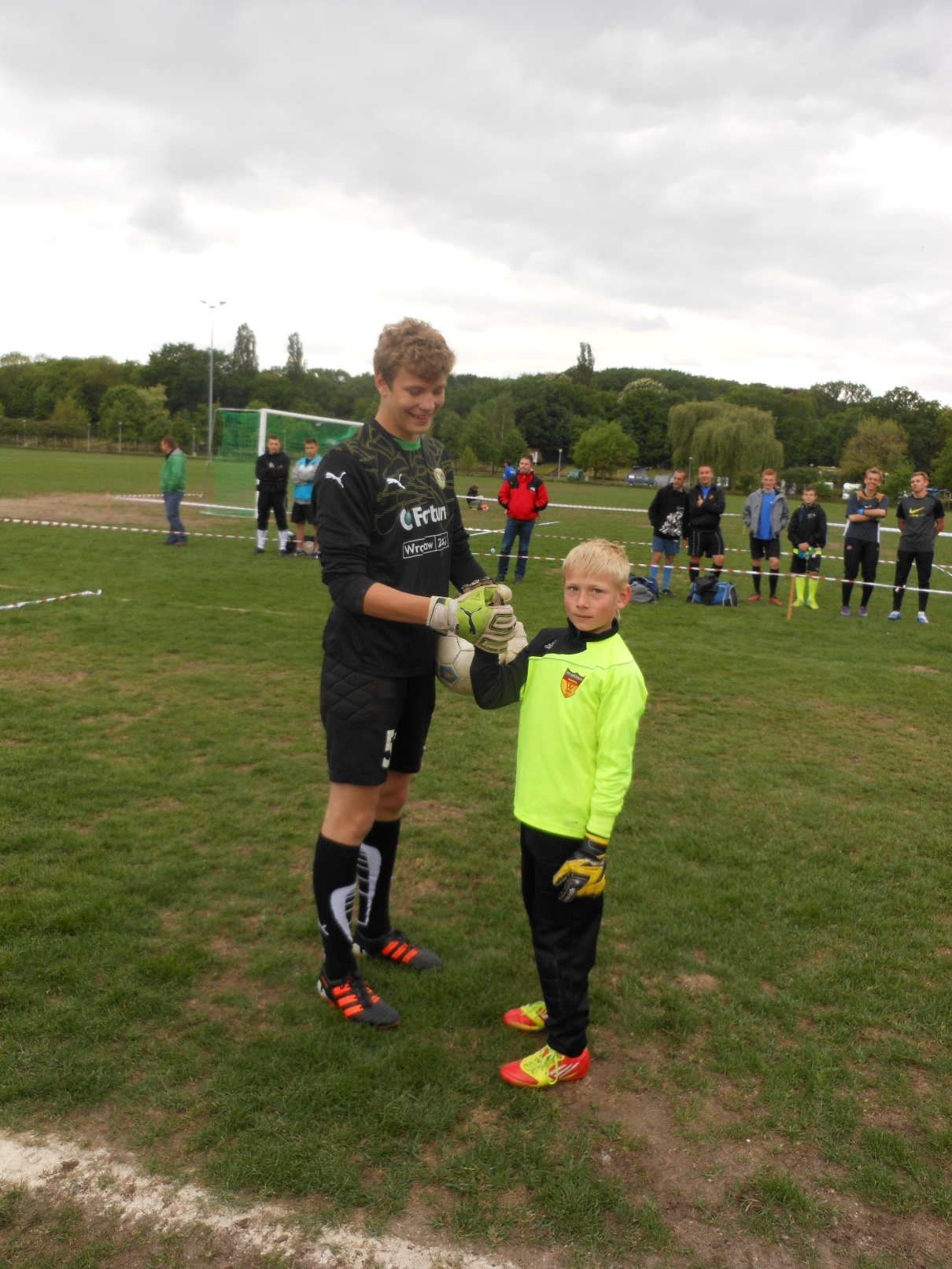
- Wrąbel (left) in 2012

Personal information
- Full name: Jakub Wrąbel
- Date of birth: 8 June 1996 (age 30)
- Place of birth: Wrocław, Poland
- Height: 1.97 m (6 ft 5 1/2 in)
- Position: Goalkeeper

Team information
- Current team: Ruch Chorzów
- Number: 44

Youth career
- –2012: Parasol Wrocław
- 2012–2013: Śląsk Wrocław

Senior career*
Years	Team	Apps	(Gls)
2013–2019	Śląsk Wrocław II	48	(0)
2013–2019	Śląsk Wrocław	27	(0)
2016–2017	→ Olimpia Grudziądz (loan)	30	(0)
2019–2021	Wisła Płock	1	(0)
2020	→ Stal Mielec (loan)	9	(0)
2021	→ Widzew Łódź (loan)	15	(0)
2021–2023	Widzew Łódź	22	(0)
2023–2024	Stal Rzeszów	26	(0)
2024–2026	Miedź Legnica	55	(0)
2026–	Ruch Chorzów	0	(0)

International career
2015	Poland U19	3	(0)
2015	Poland U20	2	(0)
2015–2017	Poland U21	10	(0)
- * Club domestic league appearances and goals as of 14:57, 29 May 2026 (UTC)

Jakub Wrąbel (born 8 June 1996) is a Polish professional footballer who plays as a goalkeeper for I liga club Ruch Chorzów.

== Honours ==
Śląsk Wrocław II

- IV liga Lower Silesia East: 2018–19

Stal Mielec

- I liga: 2019–20
