= Kornel Osyra =

Polish footballer

Personal information
- Full name: Kornel Osyra
- Date of birth: 7 February 1993 (age 33)
- Place of birth: Brzeg Dolny, Poland
- Height: 1.90 m (6 ft 3 in)
- Position: Centre-back

Team information
- Current team: Podbeskidzie II

Youth career
- KP Brzeg Dolny
- 2008–2012: Zagłębie Lubin

Senior career*
Years	Team	Apps	(Gls)
2011–2012	Zagłębie Lubin	0	(0)
2012	Gryf Wejherowo	6	(0)
2012–2017	Piast Gliwice	61	(4)
2012	→ Gryf Wejherowo (loan)	5	(0)
2016–2017	→ Termalica (loan)	31	(2)
2017–2019	Miedź Legnica	37	(1)
2019–2021	Podbeskidzie	34	(1)
2021–2022	Sandecja Nowy Sącz	16	(1)
2022–2023	Hebar	27	(0)
2023–2024	Resovia	24	(0)
2024–2026	Podbeskidzie	19	(1)
2025–	Podbeskidzie II	10	(0)

International career
2008	Poland U16	2	(0)
2009–2010	Poland U17	3	(0)
2011	Poland U19	3	(0)
- * Club domestic league appearances and goals as of 19:22, 2 February 2026 (UTC)

Kornel Osyra (born 7 February 1993) is a Polish professional footballer who plays as a defender for V liga Silesia club Podbeskidzie Bielsko-Biała II. He also serves as an assistant coach for Podbeskidzie's senior team.

== Honours ==
Miedź Legnica

- I liga: 2017–18
