= Jakub Szumski =

Polish footballer

Personal information
- Full name: Jakub Szumski
- Date of birth: 6 March 1992 (age 34)
- Place of birth: Warsaw, Poland
- Height: 1.94 m (6 ft 4 in)
- Position: Goalkeeper

Team information
- Current team: Iğdır

Youth career
- 2000–2010: Legia Warsaw

Senior career*
Years	Team	Apps	(Gls)
2010–2013	Legia Warsaw	0	(0)
2012–2013	→ Piast Gliwice (loan)	1	(0)
2013–2015	Piast Gliwice	12	(0)
2013–2015	Piast Gliwice II	21	(0)
2015–2018	Legia Warsaw	0	(0)
2015–2018	Legia Warsaw II	32	(0)
2016–2017	→ Zagłębie Sosnowiec (loan)	23	(0)
2018–2020	Raków Częstochowa	49	(0)
2021–2022	BB Erzurumspor	53	(0)
2022–2024	Samsunspor	35	(0)
2024–2026	Sakaryaspor	66	(0)
2026–	Iğdır	0	(0)

International career
2011	Poland U19	1	(0)
2011–2012	Poland U20	8	(0)
2013–2014	Poland U21	12	(0)
- * Club domestic league appearances and goals as of 11:23, 18 April 2026 (UTC)

Jakub Szumski (born 6 March 1992) is a Polish professional footballer who plays as a goalkeeper for TFF 1. Lig club Iğdır. Besides Poland, he has played in Turkey.

== Club career ==
On 30 July 2012, Szumski was loaned from Legia Warsaw to Piast Gliwice until the end of the season. In July 2013, he signed a three-year deal with Piast.

== Honours ==
Raków Częstochowa

- I liga: 2018–19
- Polish Cup: 2020–21
