= Slaven Juriša =

Croatian footballer

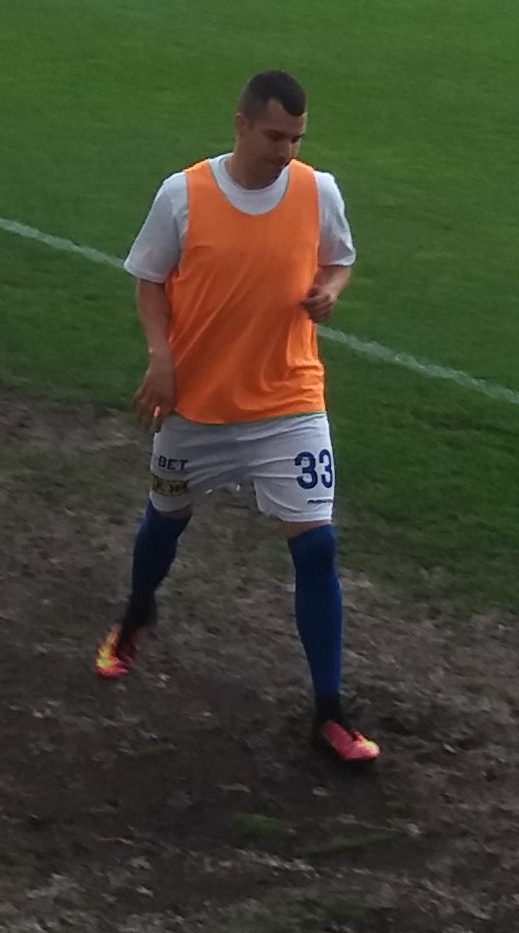
- Juriša with Motor Lublin in 2017

Personal information
- Date of birth: 18 January 1992 (age 34)
- Place of birth: Pančevo, FR Yugoslavia
- Height: 1.75 m (5 ft 9 in)
- Position: Midfielder

Team information
- Current team: FCG Neureut
- Number: 10

Senior career*
Years	Team	Apps	(Gls)
2009–2010	Đakovo		
2010–2011	Cibalia	0	(0)
2011	Marsonia	7	(0)
2012	Torpedo Kuševac		
2013–2016	Dinamo Pančevo		
2016–2017	Górnik Łęczna	4	(1)
2017	→ Motor Lublin (loan)	11	(0)
2017–2018	Marsonia 1909		
2018	Mladost Omoljica		
2018–2019	Legionovia	12	(2)
2019	Dinamo Pančevo		
2019–2020	Mladost Omoljica		
2021	Borac Sakule		
2022	Feniks 1995		
2022–2023	Tekstilac Odžaci		
2023	PKB Padinska Skela		
2023–2024	ASV Durlach	28	(2)
2024-	FCG Neureut	6	(2)
- * Club domestic league appearances and goals as of 29 January 2024

Slaven Juriša (born 18 January 1992) is a Croatian professional footballer who plays as a midfielder for German club FCG Neureut whom he joined from ASV Durlach.

== Career ==
On 3 March 2017, Juriša joined Motor Lublin on loan until the end of the 2016–17 season.

After less than a half year at Serbian club FK Mladost Omoljica, Juriša joined Polish club Legionovia Legionowo in the summer 2018. He played 14 games and scored two goals in all competitions, before he left and joined FK Dinamo Pančevo at the end of January 2019.

He was part of the "Croats from Serbia" team at the 2016 EUROPEADA games.

== Honours ==
Motor Lublin

- Polish Cup (Lublin County regionals): 2016–17
