= Bartłomiej Pawłowski =

Polish footballer

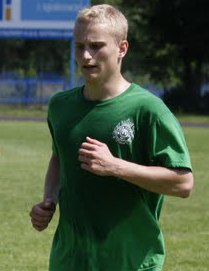
- Pawłowski with Warta Poznań in 2012

Personal information
- Full name: Bartłomiej Radosław Pawłowski
- Date of birth: 13 November 1992 (age 34)
- Place of birth: Zgierz, Poland
- Height: 1.78 m (5 ft 10 in)
- Positions: Forward; winger

Team information
- Current team: Arka Gdynia
- Number: 19

Youth career
- ŁKS Łódź
- 2009–2010: Promień Opalenica

Senior career*
Years	Team	Apps	(Gls)
2010–2013	Jagiellonia Białystok	7	(0)
2010–2011	→ Jagiellonia Białystok (ME)	7	(3)
2011	→ GKS Katowice (loan)	7	(0)
2012	→ Jarota Jarocin (loan)	14	(5)
2012	→ Warta Poznań (loan)	17	(4)
2013	→ Widzew Łódź (loan)	15	(4)
2013–2014	Widzew Łódź	2	(0)
2013–2014	→ Málaga (loan)	8	(1)
2014–2017	Lechia Gdańsk	18	(0)
2015	→ Zawisza Bydgoszcz (loan)	15	(0)
2015–2016	→ Korona Kielce (loan)	27	(5)
2017–2019	Zagłębie Lubin	64	(11)
2019–2020	Gaziantep	18	(1)
2020–2022	Śląsk Wrocław	34	(3)
2022–2026	Widzew Łódź	95	(25)
2025	Widzew Łódź II	1	(0)
2026–	Arka Gdynia	0	(0)

International career
2010–2011	Poland U19	10	(4)
2012–2014	Poland U21	13	(4)
- * Club domestic league appearances and goals as of 17:16, 29 May 2026 (UTC)

Bartłomiej Radosław Pawłowski (Polish pronunciation: [barˈtwɔmjɛj paˈvwɔfskʲi]; born 13 November 1992) is a Polish professional footballer who plays as a forward or left winger for I liga club Arka Gdynia.

== Club career ==
Pawłowski began his career in the youth ranks of ŁKS Łódź and Promień Opalenica. In June 2010, he joined Jagiellonia Białystok on a three-year contract. In July 2011, he was loaned to GKS Katowice on a one-year deal.

On 19 June 2017, he signed a contract with Zagłębie Lubin.

On 3 August 2019, Pawłowski signed a three-year contract with Turkish Süper Lig club Gazişehir Gaziantep. However, he was mostly used as a substitute there.

On 10 September 2020, he joined Polish Ekstraklasa side Śląsk Wrocław on a three-year deal. By the decision of the training staff, Pawłowski was moved to the Śląsk's reserves on 13 January 2022.

== International career ==
He was part of the Poland U19 and U21 national teams.
