= Mariusz Idzik =

Polish footballer

Personal information
- Date of birth: 1 April 1997 (age 29)
- Place of birth: Wrocław, Poland
- Height: 1.87 m (6 ft 2 in)
- Position: Forward

Youth career
- –2014: Śląsk Wrocław

Senior career*
Years	Team	Apps	(Gls)
2014–2017	Śląsk Wrocław II	29	(8)
2015–2017	Śląsk Wrocław	8	(0)
2017	→ Wisła Puławy (loan)	11	(4)
2017–2019	Miedź Legnica	3	(0)
2017–2019	Miedź Legnica II	16	(3)
2019–2021	Ruch Chorzów	51	(35)
2021–2022	Śląsk Wrocław II	18	(1)
2022–2023	Górnik Polkowice	26	(3)
2023–2024	Rekord Bielsko-Biała	30	(5)
2024–2025	Stal Brzeg	9	(1)
- * Club domestic league appearances and goals as of 19:34, 18 June 2025 (UTC)

Mariusz Idzik (born 1 April 1997) is a Polish professional footballer who plays as a forward.

== Honours ==
Miedź Legnica

- I liga: 2017–18

Ruch Chorzów

- III liga, group III: 2020–21

Rekord Bielsko-Biała

- III liga, group III: 2023–24

Individual

- III liga, group III top scorer: 2019–20
