= Andriy Vatseba =

Ukrainian footballer

Personal information
- Full name: Andriy Vladimirovich Vatseba
- Date of birth: 7 December 1995 (age 30)
- Place of birth: Ivano-Frankivsk, Ukraine
- Height: 1.85 m (6 ft 1 in)
- Position: Midfielder

Youth career
- Karpaty Lviv
- Dynamo Kyiv

Senior career*
Years	Team	Apps	(Gls)
2014	Resovia	8	(0)
2014	Nyva Ternopil	2	(0)
2015–2016	Nika Ivano-Frankivsk	28	(4)
2016–2017	Arka Gdynia	0	(0)
2017	→ Gryf Wejherowo (loan)	3	(0)
2018	Prykarpattia Ivano-Frankivsk	5	(0)
2019	Arameisk-Syrianska	22	(0)
2020–2021	Prykarpattia Ivano-Frankivsk	24	(0)
2021–2022	Blago-Yunist Verkhnya		
- * Club domestic league appearances and goals

Andriy Vladimirovich Vatseba (Russian: Андрей Вацеба; born 7 December 1995) is a Ukrainian former professional footballer who played as a midfielder.

== Career ==
As a youth player, Vatseba joined the youth academy of Dynamo Kyiv, Ukraine's most successful club.

Before the second half of 2013/14, he signed for Polish fourth division club Resovia.

Before the 2015 season, he signed for Ukrainian lower league side Nika (Ivano-Frankivsk).

On 13 September 2016, Vatseba signed a two-year contract with Polish Ekstraklasa side Arka Gdynia.

Before the second half of the 2016–17 season, he was sent on loan to II liga team Gryf Wejherowo.

Before the 2019 season, he signed for Arameisk-Syrianska in the Swedish fourth division.

In February 2020, Vatseba joined Ukrainian second division outfit Prykarpattia.
