= Alban Sulejmani =

Macedonian footballer (born 1998)

Personal information
- Full name: Alban Sulejmani
- Date of birth: 14 April 1998 (age 28)
- Place of birth: Kumanovo, Macedonia
- Height: 1.82 m (6 ft 0 in)
- Position: Winger

Youth career
- 2006–2012: Milano
- 2012–2014: Rabotnichki
- 2014–2015: Makedonija GP

Senior career*
| Years | Team | Apps | (Gls) |
| 2015–2016 | Renova | 8 | (0) |
| 2016–2017 | Legia Warsaw | 0 | (0) |
| 2016 | → Pogoń Siedlce (loan) | 5 | (0) |
| 2017 | Legia Warsaw II | 7 | (0) |
| 2017–2018 | Partizani Tirana | 7 | (0) |
| 2018–2019 | Renova | 22 | (1) |
| 2019–2020 | Makedonija GP | 3 | (0) |
| 2020 | Struga | 4 | (0) |
| 2020 | Makedonija GP | 4 | (0) |
| 2021 | Pelister | 8 | (0) |

International career
| 2016 | Macedonia U18 | 3 | (0) |
| 2016 | Macedonia U19 | 2 | (0) |
- * Club domestic league appearances and goals

Alban Sulejmani (born 14 April 1998) is a Macedonian former professional footballer who played as a winger.

== Club career ==
=== Early career ===
Sulejmani played with several clubs during his youth, including his hometown clubs Milano Kumanovo, Rabotnički, and Makedonija Gjorče Petrov.

=== Renova ===
In 2015, Sulejmani moved to Renova in the Macedonian First Football League. He made his league debut for the club on 27 September 2015 in a 1–0 away loss to Metalurg Skopje. He was subbed on for Elmedin Redjepi in the 64th minute.

=== Legia Warsaw ===
In July 2016, Sulejmani joined Polish club Legia Warsaw on a free transfer. After trialing with the club, he signed a four-year contract. However, he spent his time with the reserve side, and never made a first team appearance.

=== Pogoń Siedlce (loan) ===
Later that same month, Sulejmani was loaned out to I liga club Pogoń Siedlce. He made his league debut for the club on 13 August 2016 in a 3–0 home loss to Sandecja Nowy Sącz. He was subbed on for Michał Bajdur in the 58th minute. He picked up a yellow card in the 75th minute of that match. Sulejmani would go on to make just four more league appearances during the duration of his loan, coming on as a sub against Górnik Zabrze, Chojniczanka Chojnice, and Miedź Legnica. He made the starting eleven for the first time with Pogoń Siedlce on 27 August 2016 in a 1–0 away defeat to Olimpia Grudziądz.

=== Partizani Tirana ===
In Summer 2017, Sulejmani moved to FK Partizani Tirana on a free transfer. He signed a four-year contract. He made his Albanian Superliga debut on 4 November 2017 in a 1–0 away loss to FC Kamza. He was subbed on for Giovanni La Camera in the 85th minute.

=== Return to Renova ===
In July 2018, Sulejmani completed his return to FK Renova. He scored his first goal for the club between both stints on his first appearance back with the club. On 11 August 2018, Sulejmani scored in the fourth minute of a 4–3 away win over former youth club FK Rabotnički. His goal was the first of the game.
