= Damian Podleśny =

Polish footballer

Personal information
- Full name: Damian Podleśny
- Date of birth: 18 May 1995 (age 31)
- Place of birth: Lubartów, Poland
- Height: 1.94 m (6 ft 4 in)
- Position: Goalkeeper

Team information
- Current team: Lewart Lubartów
- Number: 1

Youth career
- Lewart Lubartów

Senior career*
Years	Team	Apps	(Gls)
2012–2013	Lewart Lubartów		
2013–2014	GKS Bełchatów	2	(0)
2013–2014	GKS Bełchatów II	16	(0)
2014–2015	Lechia Gdańsk II	9	(0)
2014–2018	Lechia Gdańsk	2	(0)
2014–2015	→ Chojniczanka Chojnice (loan)	10	(0)
2015–2016	→ Chojniczanka Chojnice (loan)	22	(0)
2017	→ Wigry Suwałki (loan)	1	(0)
2018–2019	Górnik Łęczna	3	(0)
2019–2020	RKS Radomsko	12	(0)
2020	Legionovia Legionowo	12	(0)
2020–2021	RKS Radomsko	21	(0)
2021–	Lewart Lubartów	123	(1)
- * Club domestic league appearances and goals as of 12:49, 9 June 2025 (UTC)

Damian Podleśny (born 18 May 1995) is a Polish footballer who plays as a goalkeeper for IV liga Lublin club Lewart Lubartów.

== Career ==
On 9 June 2023, Podleśny scored his first career goal in a 2–2 home league draw against Start Krasnystaw on 9 June 2023, equalizing from a header in the 95th minute.

== Honours ==
GKS Bełchatów

- I liga: 2013–14

Lewart Lubartów

- IV liga Lublin: 2023–24
