= Krystian Popiela =

Polish footballer

Personal information
- Date of birth: 19 January 1998
- Place of birth: Tarnów, Poland
- Date of death: 9 September 2018 (aged 20)
- Place of death: Wola Wielka, Poland
- Height: 1.84 m (6 ft 0 in)
- Position: Striker

Youth career
- Fivos Varis
- Olympiacos
- Białe Orły Warsaw
- Polonia Warsaw
- 2016: Cagliari

Senior career*
Years	Team	Apps	(Gls)
2016–2017	Wisła Płock	2	(0)
2017	Olimpia Grudziądz	3	(0)
2017–2018	Unia Tarnów	16	(3)
2018	Stal Rzeszów	4	(0)
Total		25	(3)
- * Club domestic league appearances and goals

Krystian Popiela (19 January 1998 – 9 September 2018) was a Polish professional footballer who played as a striker.

== Career ==
Born in Tarnów, Popiela began his early career with Fivos Varis, Olympiacos, Białe Orły and Polonia Warsaw, before joining Italian club Cagliari in January 2016. He later played for Wisła Płock, Olimpia Grudziądz, Unia Tarnów and Stal Rzeszów.

== Personal life ==
Popiela was a son of Jarosław Popiela, who made 134 appearances in the Ekstraklasa.

== Death ==
Popiela died in a car crash on 9 September 2018, at the age of 20. He was buried in the cemetery at Poręba Radlna, with his funeral taking place on 14 September 2018 at the Church of St. Maximilian Kolbe in Świebodzin, Tarnów County.
