= 2016–17 Polish Cup =

Puchar Polski

Tournament details
- Country: Poland
- Dates: 16 July 2016 – 2 May 2017
- Teams: 68

Final positions
- Champions: Arka Gdynia
- Runners-up: Lech Poznań

Tournament statistics
- Matches played: 69
- Goals scored: 219 (3.17 per match)
- Top goal scorer(s): Rafał Jankowski; Kamil Zapolnik (4 goals each)

The 2016–17 Polish Cup was the 63rd season of the annual Polish football knockout tournament. It began on 16 July 2016 with the first matches of the Preliminary Round and ended on 2 May 2017 with the Final at Stadion Narodowy. Winners of the competition will qualify for the qualifying tournament of the 2017–18 UEFA Europa League.

== Participating teams ==
Enter in Round of 32	Enter in First Round	Enter in Preliminary Round		
2015–16 Ekstraklasa; 16 teams	2015–16 I liga 12 highest ranked teams	2015–16 I liga 6 lowest ranked teams	2015–16 II liga 18 teams	Winners of 16 regional cup competitions
Legia Warsaw; Piast Gliwice; Zagłębie Lubin; Cracovia; Lechia Gdańsk; Pogoń Szczecin; Lech Poznań; Ruch Chorzów; Wisła Kraków; Śląsk Wrocław; Jagiellonia Białystok; Korona Kielce; Bruk-Bet Termalica Nieciecza; Górnik Łęczna; Górnik Zabrze; Podbeskidzie Bielsko-Biała	Arka Gdynia; Wisła Płock; Zagłębie Sosnowiec; GKS Katowice; ~~Zawisza Bydgoszcz~~^{1}; Chrobry Głogów; Miedź Legnica; Bytovia Bytów; Sandecja Nowy Sącz; Wigry Suwałki; Stomil Olsztyn; Chojniczanka Chojnice	Olimpia Grudziądz; Pogoń Siedlce; MKS Kluczbork; GKS Bełchatów; Rozwój Katowice; ~~Dolcan Ząbki~~^{2}	Stal Mielec; Znicz Pruszków; GKS Tychy; Wisła Puławy; Raków Częstochowa; Siarka Tarnobrzeg; Puszcza Niepołomice; Radomiak Radom; Kotwica Kołobrzeg; Legionovia Legionowo; Polonia Bytom; Błękitni Stargard; KS ROW 1964 Rybnik; Olimpia Zambrów; Stal Stalowa Wola; ~~Nadwiślan Góra~~^{4}; Gryf Wejherowo; ~~Okocimski KS Brzesko~~^{3}	Miedź Legnica II (Lower Silesian); Wda Świecie (Kuyavian-Pomeranian); Chełmianka Chełm (Lublin); Stilon Gorzów Wielkopolski (Lubusz); Lechia Tomaszów Mazowiecki (Łódź); Garbarnia Kraków (Lesser Poland); Świt Nowy Dwór Mazowiecki (Masovian); Odra Opole (Opole); JKS Jarosław (Podkarpackie); ŁKS Łomża (Podlaskie); Pogoń Lębork (Pomeranian); GKS Jastrzębie (Silesian); KSZO Ostrowiec Świętokrzyski (Świętokrzyskie); Rominta Gołdap (Warmian-Masurian); KKS Kalisz (Greater Poland); Świt Skolwin (West Pomeranian)

Source: 90minut.pl

Notes

1. Zawisza did not receive a license for the 2016–17 season and withdrew from the competition.
2. Dolcan dissolved during the 2015–16 season.
3. Okocimski dissolved during the 2015–16 season.
4. Nadwiślan withdrew from the competition.

== Round and draw dates ==
Round	Draw date	First leg	Second leg
Preliminary round	24 June 2016	15–17 July 2016	—
First round	24 June 2016	22–27 July 2016	—
Round of 32	25 July 2016	9-24 August 2016	—
Round of 16	25 July 2016	20–28 September 2016	—
Quarter-finals	25 July 2016	25–26 October 2016	29–30 November 2016
Semi-finals	30 November 2016	28 February, 1 March 2017	4–5 April 2017
Final	10 April 2017	2 May 2017 at PGE Narodowy	—

Source: 90minut.pl

== Preliminary round ==
The draw for this round was conducted at the headquarters of the Polish FA on 24 June 2016. Participating in this round were 16 regional cup winners, 18 teams from the 2015–16 II liga and 6 lowest ranked teams from the 2015–16 I liga. The matches were played on 15-17 July 2016.

16 of the 24 I liga and II liga teams participating in the preliminary round were drawn against the 16 regional cup winners, and the remaining 8 were drawn against each other. Games were hosted by teams playing in the lower division in the 2016–17 season. (Note: Regional cup winners were assured to be hosts of both the preliminary round and the first round games, regardless of their and their opponents' relative position in the league pyramid. However, all regional cup winners happened to be drawn against either teams playing in higher divisions or teams that subsequently withdrew from the competition.) The hosts of Odra Opole vs. Siarka Tarnobrzeg and Radomiak Radom vs. Stal Stalowa Wola (all teams playing in 2016–17 II liga) games was determined by the order in which the teams were drawn. The number in brackets indicates what tier of Polish football each team competes in during the 2016–17 season.

Team 1	Score	Team 2
15 July 2016
Raków Częstochowa (3)	2–1 (a.e.t.)	Wisła Puławy (2)
16 July 2016
Wda Świecie (4)	3–0	Rozwój Katowice (3)
GKS Jastrzębie (4)	1–0	Olimpia Grudziądz (2)
JKS Jarosław (4)	2–3 (a.e.t.)	KS ROW 1964 Rybnik (3)
Stilon Gorzów Wielkopolski (5)	0–3	Pogoń Siedlce (2)
Lechia Tomaszów Mazowiecki (4)	0–2	Stal Mielec (2)
Odra Opole (3)	0–3	Siarka Tarnobrzeg (3)
Miedź Legnica II (4)	1–4	GKS Bełchatów (3)
ŁKS Łomża (4)	2–3 (a.e.t.)	GKS Tychy (2)
KKS Kalisz (4)	5–4 (a.e.t.)	MKS Kluczbork (2)
Garbarnia Kraków (4)	0–1	Puszcza Niepołomice (3)
Chełmianka Chełm (5)	1–3 (a.e.t.)	Olimpia Zambrów (3)
Świt Nowy Dwór Mazowiecki (4)	2–1	Znicz Pruszków (2)
Pogoń Lębork (4)	0–6	Kotwica Kołobrzeg (3)
Radomiak Radom (3)	4–0	Stal Stalowa Wola (3)
Błękitni Stargard (3)	4–1	Gryf Wejherowo (3)
17 July 2016
Świt Skolwin (4)	0–0 (a.e.t.) (4–5 p)	Polonia Bytom (3)
No match
Rominta Gołdap (5)	bye to the next round	
KSZO Ostrowiec Świętokrzyski (4)	bye to the next round	
Nadwiślan Góra (5)	0–3 (awarded)^{1}	Legionovia Legionowo (3)

Notes

- Note 1: Nadwiślan Góra withdrew from the competition.

15 July 2016	Raków Częstochowa	2–1 (a.e.t.)	Wisła Puławy	Częstochowa
17:00 CEST (UTC+02:00)	Malinowski 41'; Płonka 115'	Report	Pielach 5'	Stadium: Miejski Stadion Piłkarski Raków; Attendance: 300; Referee: Marcin Szczerbowicz (Olsztyn)

16 July 2016	Świt Nowy Dwór Mazowiecki	2–1	Znicz Pruszków	Nowy Dwór Mazowiecki
16:00 CEST (UTC+02:00)	Maciejewski 71'; Drwęcki 90'	Report	Machalski 90' (pen.)	Stadium: Stadion Świtu; Attendance: 220; Referee: Paweł Pskit (Łódź)

16 July 2016	Wda Świecie	3–0	Rozwój Katowice	Świecie
17:00 CEST (UTC+02:00)	Rożnowski 17', 30'; Urbański 82'	Report		Stadium: Stadion Miejski; Attendance: 400; Referee: Tomasz Radkiewicz (Łódź)

16 July 2016	JKS Jarosław	2–3 (a.e.t.)	KS ROW 1964 Rybnik	Jarosław
17:00 CEST (UTC+02:00)	Raba 23'; Hass 63'	Report	Muszalik 11' (pen.); Nowak 86'; Jaroszewski 99'	Stadium: Stadion Miejski; Attendance: 896; Referee: Konrad Gąsiorowski (Biała Podlaska)

16 July 2016	Lechia Tomaszów Mazowiecki	0–2	Stal Mielec	Tomaszów Mazowiecki
17:00 CEST (UTC+02:00)		Report	Sobczak 70'; Szczepański 90'	Stadium: Stadion Miejski; Attendance: 500; Referee: Łukasz Szczech (Warsaw)

16 July 2016	ŁKS Łomża	2–3 (a.e.t.)	GKS Tychy	Łomża
17:00 CEST (UTC+02:00)	Lemański 17'; Baranowski 57'	Report	Mączyński 25'; Grzeszczyk 51' (pen.), 103' (pen.)	Stadium: Stadion Miejski; Attendance: 519; Referee: Dominik Sulikowski (Gdańsk)

16 July 2016	KKS Kalisz	5–4 (a.e.t.)	MKS Kluczbork	Kalisz
17:00 CEST (UTC+02:00)	Ciesielski 41'; Jankowski 61' (pen.), 90', 101'; Orłowicz 90' (o.g.)	Report	Niziołek 19', 51' (pen.); Gondek 23'; Kojder 60'	Stadium: Stadion Miejski; Attendance: 600; Referee: Adam Lyczmański (Bydgoszcz)

16 July 2016	Chełmianka Chełm	1–3 (a.e.t.)	Olimpia Zambrów	Chełm
17:00 CEST (UTC+02:00)	Budzyński 58'	Report	Buzun 68'; Biel 100' (pen.); Grzybowski 108'	Stadium: Stadion Miejski; Attendance: 500; Referee: Marcin Szrek (Kielce)

16 July 2016	Błękitni Stargard	4–1	Gryf Wejherowo	Stargard
17:00 CEST (UTC+02:00)	Brzeziański 22', 82'; Magnuski 25'; Więcek 90'	Report	Kuzimski 87'	Stadium: Stadion Miejski; Attendance: 600; Referee: Mariusz Korpalski (Toruń)

16 July 2016	Odra Opole	0–3	Siarka Tarnobrzeg	Opole
17:30 CEST (UTC+02:00)		Report	Tomalski 1'; Czyżycki 61'; Stromecki 90'	Stadium: Stadion Miejski; Attendance: 700; Referee: Maciej Pelka (Piła)

16 July 2016	GKS Jastrzębie	1–0	Olimpia Grudziądz	Jastrzębie-Zdrój
17:30 CEST (UTC+02:00)	Szczepan 84'	Report		Stadium: Stadion Miejski; Attendance: 500; Referee: Marek Opaliński (Legnica)

16 July 2016	Stilon Gorzów Wielkopolski	0–3	Pogoń Siedlce	Gorzów Wielkopolski
18:00 CEST (UTC+02:00)		Report	Tomasiewicz 7'; Świerblewski 61', 81'	Stadium: Stadion OSiR; Attendance: 500; Referee: Łukasz Bednarek (Koszalin)

16 July 2016	Miedź Legnica II	1–4	GKS Bełchatów	Legnica
18:00 CEST (UTC+02:00)	Wójcik 24'	Report	Grolik 34'; Zgarda 39'; Papikjan 80', 90'	Stadium: Stadion im. Orła Białego; Referee: Konrad Aluszyk (Gorzów Wielkopolski)

16 July 2016	Garbarnia Kraków	0–1	Puszcza Niepołomice	Kraków
18:00 CEST (UTC+02:00)		Report	Domański 24'	Stadium: Stadion Garbarni; Attendance: 300; Referee: Daniel Kruczyński (Żywiec)

16 July 2016	Pogoń Lębork	0–6	Kotwica Kołobrzeg	Lębork
18:00 CEST (UTC+02:00)		Report	Poznański 38' (pen.); Świechowski 45'; Żmijewski 55'; Zieliński 69', 85', 90'	Stadium: Stadion Miejski; Referee: Piotr Łęgosz (Włocławek)

16 July 2016	Radomiak Radom	4–0	Stal Stalowa Wola	Radom
18:00 CEST (UTC+02:00)	Filipowicz 34'; Stanisławski 55', 69'; Kwiek 77'	Report		Stadium: Stadion MOSiR; Attendance: 1,628; Referee: Jacek Małyszek (Lublin)

17 July 2016	Świt Skolwin	0–0 (a.e.t.) (4–5 p)	Polonia Bytom	Szczecin
17:00 CEST (UTC+02:00)		Report		Stadium: Stadion Świtu; Attendance: 500; Referee: Sebastian Tarnowski (Wrocław)
	Penalties
	Krystek (penalty scored); Kołodziejski (penalty scored); Filipowicz (penalty missed); Krawiec (penalty scored); Garlej (penalty scored)		(penalty scored) Szal; (penalty scored) Słodowy; (penalty scored) Stefański; (penalty scored) Mróz; (penalty scored) Lachowski

== First round ==
The draw for this round was conducted at the headquarters of the Polish FA on 24 June 2016. The matches will be played on 22–27 July 2016. Participating in this round will the 20 winners from the previous round and 12 highest ranked teams from the 2015–16 I liga. Winners of match 2 will advance to the next round. The 12 teams joining in this round were seeded and their opponents were drawn from the 20 winners of the preliminary round (the other 6 formed the remaining 3 matches). Games will be hosted by teams playing in the lower division in the 2016–17 season. Hosts of matches between teams playing in the same tier will be decided by a draw. The number in brackets indicates what tier of Polish football each team competes in during the 2016–17 season.

Team 1	Score	Team 2
22 July 2016
Radomiak Radom (3)	1–0	GKS Katowice (2)
KS ROW 1964 Rybnik (3)	1–3	Stomil Olsztyn (2)
23 July 2016
Świt Nowy Dwór Mazowiecki (4)	0–1	Wigry Suwałki (2)
Kotwica Kołobrzeg (3)	2–3	Chojniczanka Chojnice (2)
Raków Częstochowa (3)	2–2 (6–5 p)	Chrobry Głogów (2)
Siarka Tarnobrzeg (3)	2–4 (a.e.t.)	Sandecja Nowy Sącz (2)
GKS Bełchatów (3)	1–1 (6–7 p)	Miedź Legnica (2)
Legionovia Legionowo (3)	0–3	Zagłębie Sosnowiec (2)
Błękitni Stargard (3)	1–2	Bytovia Bytów (2)
KSZO Ostrowiec Świętokrzyski (4)	2–1 (a.e.t.)	Pogoń Siedlce (2)
KKS Kalisz (4)	1–0	Polonia Bytom (3)
Wda Świecie (4)	1–2 (a.e.t.)	Puszcza Niepołomice (3)
Olimpia Zambrów (3)	2–1	GKS Tychy (2)
26 July 2016
Rominta Gołdap (5)	1–4	Arka Gdynia (1)
27 July 2016
Stal Mielec (2)	4–3	Wisła Płock (1)
No match
GKS Jastrzębie (4)	bye to the next round	

22 July 2016	Radomiak Radom	1–0	GKS Katowice	Radom
18:30 CEST (UTC+02:00)	Leândro 6' (pen.)	Report		Stadium: Stadion MOSiR; Attendance: 3,066; Referee: Michał Mularczyk (Skierniewice)

22 July 2016	KS ROW 1964 Rybnik	1–3	Stomil Olsztyn	Rybnik
19:00 CEST (UTC+02:00)	Muszalik 85' (pen.)	Report	Kujawa 27'; Żwir 34', 37'	Stadium: Stadion Miejski; Attendance: 561; Referee: Sebastian Krasny (Kraków)

23 July 2016	Olimpia Zambrów	2–1	GKS Tychy	Zambrów
13:00 CEST (UTC+02:00)	Szerszeń 12'; Biel 90'	Report	Mączyński 71'	Stadium: Stadion Miejski; Attendance: 500; Referee: Sebastian Załęski (Ostrołęka)

23 July 2016	Świt Nowy Dwór Mazowiecki	0–1	Wigry Suwałki	Nowy Dwór Mazowiecki
16:00 CEST (UTC+02:00)		Report	Adamek 44'	Stadium: Stadion Świtu; Attendance: 270; Referee: Zbigniew Dobrynin (Łódź)

23 July 2016	Legionovia Legionowo	0–3	Zagłębie Sosnowiec	Legionowo
16:30 CEST (UTC+02:00)		Report	Dudek 52' (pen.); Wiktorski 74'; Wilk 90'	Stadium: Stadion Miejski; Attendance: 500; Referee: Karol Rudziński (Olsztyn)

23 July 2016	Raków Częstochowa	2–2 (a.e.t.) (6–5 p)	Chrobry Głogów	Częstochowa
17:00 CEST (UTC+02:00)	Kamiński 61'; Warchoł 71'	Report	Ilków-Gołąb 29'; Kowalczyk 90'	Stadium: Miejski Stadion Piłkarski Raków; Attendance: 830; Referee: Tomasz Wajda (Żywiec)
	Penalties
	Margol (penalty scored); Figiel (penalty scored); Warchoł (penalty scored); Petrášek (penalty scored); Cyfert (penalty scored); Kamiński (penalty missed); Góra (penalty scored)		(penalty scored) Machaj; (penalty scored) Hodowany; (penalty scored) Ilków-Gołąb; (penalty scored) Gąsior; (penalty scored) Wojciechowski; (penalty missed) Murawski; (penalty missed) Bonecki

23 July 2016	Siarka Tarnobrzeg	2–4 (a.e.t.)	Sandecja Nowy Sącz	Tarnobrzeg
17:00 CEST (UTC+02:00)	Stefanik 8' (pen.); Koczon 90'	Report	Małkowski 49' (pen.), 99', 102'; Dudzic 70'	Stadium: Stadion MOSiR; Attendance: 1,100; Referee: Piotr Lasyk (Bytom)

23 July 2016	Błękitni Stargard	1–2	Bytovia Bytów	Stargard
17:00 CEST (UTC+02:00)	Fadecki 18'	Report	Wróbel 45' (pen.); Formela 57'	Stadium: Stadion Miejski; Attendance: 900; Referee: Piotr Idzik (Poznań)

23 July 2016	KSZO Ostrowiec Świętokrzyski	2–1 (a.e.t.)	Pogoń Siedlce	Ostrowiec Świętokrzyski
17:00 CEST (UTC+02:00)	Podstolak 90'; Jamróz 110'	Report	Tomasiewicz 11'	Stadium: Miejski Stadion Sportowy "KSZO"; Attendance: 500; Referee: Mateusz Złotnicki (Lublin)

23 July 2016	KKS Kalisz	1–0	Polonia Bytom	Kalisz
17:00 CEST (UTC+02:00)	Jankowski 41'	Report		Stadium: Stadion Miejski; Attendance: 700; Referee: Marcin Kochanek (Opole)

23 July 2016	Wda Świecie	1–2 (a.e.t.)	Puszcza Niepołomice	Świecie
17:00 CEST (UTC+02:00)	Rożnowski 84'	Report	Barbus 27'; Wójcik 94'	Stadium: Stadion Miejski; Attendance: 400; Referee: Łukasz Karski (Słupsk)

23 July 2016	GKS Bełchatów	1–1 (a.e.t.) (6–7 p)	Miedź Legnica	Bełchatów
17:30 CEST (UTC+02:00)	Rachwał 19'	Report	Stasiak 90'	Stadium: GIEKSA Arena; Attendance: 800; Referee: Sebastian Jarzębak (Bytom)
	Penalties
	Papikyan (penalty scored); Zgarda (penalty scored); Pisarczuk (penalty scored); Bartosiak (penalty scored); Rachwał (penalty scored); Szymorek (penalty scored); Michalak (penalty missed)		(penalty scored) Midzierski; (penalty scored) Stasiak; (penalty scored) Daniel; (penalty scored) Bartkowiak; (penalty scored) Forsell; (penalty scored) Martín; (penalty scored) Chrzanowski

23 July 2016	Kotwica Kołobrzeg	2–3	Chojniczanka Chojnice	Kołobrzeg
18:00 CEST (UTC+02:00)	Bartlewski 13'; Szywacz 40'	Report	Zawistowski 43'; Biskup 82'; Rybski 90'	Stadium: Stadion im. Sebastiana Karpiniuka; Attendance: 1,016; Referee: Artur Aluszyk (Szczecin)

26 July 2016	Rominta Gołdap	1–4	Arka Gdynia	Gołdap
18:00 CEST (UTC+02:00)	Mościński 90'	Report	Marciniak 19'; Siemaszko 25'; Lewicki 63'; Stolc 76'	Stadium: Stadion Miejski; Attendance: 760; Referee: Krzysztof Jakubik (Siedlce)

27 July 2016	Stal Mielec	4–3	Wisła Płock	Mielec
19:00 CEST (UTC+02:00)	Sobczak 17', 90'; Getinger 27' (pen.); Łętocha 54'	Report	Drozdowicz 6'; Piotrowski 11'; Krivets 81'	Stadium: Stadion Stali; Attendance: 3,122; Referee: Tomasz Musiał (Kraków)

== Bracket ==
Round of 32
Górnik Zabrze (a.e.t.)	3
Legia Warsaw	2
Wigry Suwałki	2
Bruk-Bet Termalica Nieciecza	1
Miedź Legnica	2
Górnik Łęczna	3
GKS Jastrzębie	2
Radomiak Radom	1
Olimpia Zambrów	0
Arka Gdynia	1
KSZO Ostrowiec Świętokrzyski	3
Raków Częstochowa	2
Bytovia Bytów	1
Zagłębie Lubin	0
Sandecja Nowy Sącz	1
Śląsk Wrocław (a.e.t.)	2
Podbeskidzie Bielsko-Biała	0
Lech Poznań	3
Stomil Olsztyn	0 (6)
Ruch Chorzów (p)	0 (7)
Chojniczanka Chojnice	2
Stal Mielec	0
Zagłębie Sosnowiec	3
Wisła Kraków (a.e.t.)	4
Cracovia	0
Jagiellonia Białystok	1
KKS Kalisz	0
Pogoń Szczecin	4
Puszcza Niepołomice (p)	1 (3)
Korona Kielce	1 (2)
Piast Gliwice	0 (3)
Lechia Gdańsk (p)	0 (5)

Round of 16
Górnik Zabrze	0
Wigry Suwałki	2
Górnik Łęczna	1 (6)
GKS Jastrzębie (p)	1 (7)
Arka Gdynia	2
KSZO Ostrowiec Świętokrzyski	1
Bytovia Bytów	3
Śląsk Wrocław	0
Lech Poznań	3
Ruch Chorzów	0
Chojniczanka Chojnice	1
Wisła Kraków	2
Jagiellonia Białystok	1
Pogoń Szczecin	4
Puszcza Niepołomice (p)	1 (4)
Lechia Gdańsk	1 (2)

Quarterfinals
Wigry Suwałki	2	1
GKS Jastrzębie	1	1
Arka Gdynia (a)	1	1
Bytovia Bytów	2	0
Lech Poznań	1	4
Wisła Kraków	1	2
Pogoń Szczecin	2	2
Puszcza Niepołomice	1	0

Semifinals
Wigry Suwałki	0	4
Arka Gdynia	3	2
Lech Poznań	3	1
Pogoń Szczecin	0	0

Final
Arka Gdynia (a.e.t.)	2
Lech Poznań	1

== Round of 32 ==
The draw for this round was conducted at the PGE Narodowy on 25 July 2016. The matches were played from 9 to 24 August 2016. Participating in this round were the 16 winners from the previous round and 16 teams from the 2015–16 Ekstraklasa. Games were hosted by teams playing in the lower division in the 2016–17 season. The hosts of matches of teams playing in the same tier were the teams occupying a higher position in the bracket.

Team 1	Score	Team 2
9 August 2016
Wigry Suwałki (2)	2–1	Bruk-Bet Termalica Nieciecza (1)
Miedź Legnica (2)	2–3	Górnik Łęczna (1)
Olimpia Zambrów (3)	0–1	Arka Gdynia (1)
KSZO Ostrowiec Świętokrzyski (4)	3–2	Raków Częstochowa (3)
Podbeskidzie Bielsko-Biała (2)	0–3	Lech Poznań (1)
Zagłębie Sosnowiec (2)	3–4 (a.e.t.)	Wisła Kraków (1)
Cracovia (1)	0–1	Jagiellonia Białystok (1)
Puszcza Niepołomice (3)	1–1 (3–2 p)	Korona Kielce (1)
10 August 2016
Górnik Zabrze (2)	3–2 (a.e.t.)	Legia Warsaw (1)
GKS Jastrzębie (4)	2–1	Radomiak Radom (3)
Bytovia Bytów (2)	1–0	Zagłębie Lubin (1)
Sandecja Nowy Sącz (2)	1–2 (a.e.t.)	Śląsk Wrocław (1)
Chojniczanka Chojnice (2)	2–0	Stal Mielec (2)
KKS Kalisz (4)	0–4	Pogoń Szczecin (1)
11 August 2016
Stomil Olsztyn (2)	0–0 (6–7 p)	Ruch Chorzów (1)
24 August 2016
Piast Gliwice (1)	0–0 (3–5 p)	Lechia Gdańsk (1)

9 August 2016	Olimpia Zambrów	0–1	Arka Gdynia	Zambrów
17:00 CEST (UTC+02:00)		Report	da Silva 90+4' (pen.)	Stadium: Stadion Miejski; Attendance: 700; Referee: Mariusz Korpalski (Toruń)

9 August 2016	KSZO Ostrowiec Świętokrzyski	3–2	Raków Częstochowa	Ostrowiec Świętokrzyski
17:00 CEST (UTC+02:00)	Jamróz 63'; Łatkowski 78' (pen.); Stachurski 81'	Report	Zaradny 42'; Oziębała 50'	Stadium: Miejski Stadion Sportowy "KSZO"; Attendance: 1,511; Referee: Daniel Kruczyński (Żywiec)

9 August 2016	Puszcza Niepołomice	1–1 (a.e.t.) (3–2 p)	Korona Kielce	Niepołomice
17:00 CEST (UTC+02:00)	Łączek 105'	Report	Marković 100'	Stadium: Stadion Miejski; Attendance: 720; Referee: Mirosław Górecki (Katowice)
	Penalties
	Orłowski (penalty scored); Kotwica (penalty missed); Lepiarz (penalty missed); Gajewski (penalty scored); Czarny (penalty scored)		(penalty missed) Grzelak; (penalty missed) Rybicki; (penalty scored) Marković; (penalty missed) Rymaniak; (penalty scored) Palanca

9 August 2016	Zagłębie Sosnowiec	3–4 (a.e.t.)	Wisła Kraków	Sosnowiec
17:30 CEST (UTC+02:00)	Udovičić 21'; Dudek 69' (pen.); Matić 87'	Report	Mójta 42'; Drzazga 75'; Nowak 77' (o.g.); Popović 110' (pen.)	Stadium: Stadion Ludowy; Attendance: 2,427; Referee: Kornel Paszkiewicz (Wrocław)

9 August 2016	Miedź Legnica	2–3	Górnik Łęczna	Legnica
18:00 CEST (UTC+02:00)	Forsell 10' (pen.), 80'	Report	Ubiparip 4'; Poźniak 46'; Śpiączka 66'	Stadium: Stadion Miejski im. Orła Białego; Attendance: 1,600; Referee: Adam Lyczmański (Bydgoszcz)

9 August 2016	Podbeskidzie Bielsko-Biała	0–3	Lech Poznań	Bielsko-Biała
19:00 CEST (UTC+02:00)		Report	Kędziora 44'; Bille 63', 86'	Stadium: Stadion Miejski; Attendance: 4,510; Referee: Tomasz Musiał (Kraków)

9 August 2016	Wigry Suwałki	2–1	Bruk-Bet Termalica Nieciecza	Suwałki
19:47 CEST (UTC+02:00)	Kuku 45'; Zapolnik 70'	Report	Nowak 72'	Stadium: Stadion Miejski; Attendance: 2,034; Referee: Mateusz Złotnicki (Lublin)

9 August 2016	Cracovia	0–1	Jagiellonia Białystok	Kraków
20:30 CEST (UTC+02:00)		Report	Świderski 46'	Stadium: Marshal Józef Piłsudski Stadium; Attendance: 4,281; Referee: Tomasz Wajda (Żywiec)

10 August 2016	GKS Jastrzębie	2–1	Radomiak Radom	Jastrzębie-Zdrój
17:00 CEST (UTC+02:00)	Pacholski 10'; Caniboł 35'	Report	Cupriak 1'	Stadium: Stadion Miejski; Attendance: 852; Referee: Sebastian Załęski (Ostrołęka)

10 August 2016	KKS Kalisz	0–4	Pogoń Szczecin	Kalisz
17:00 CEST (UTC+02:00)		Report	Zwoliński 14', 51'; Delev 24'; Jaroch 89'	Stadium: Stadion Miejski; Attendance: 1,000; Referee: Łukasz Szczech (Warsaw)

10 August 2016	Sandecja Nowy Sącz	1–2 (a.e.t.)	Śląsk Wrocław	Nowy Sącz
17:30 CEST (UTC+02:00)	Trochim 83' (pen.)	Report	Mervó 31'; Alvarinho 109'	Stadium: Stadion im. Ojca Władysława Augustynka; Attendance: 1,150; Referee: Zbigniew Dobrynin (Łódź)

10 August 2016	Bytovia Bytów	1–0	Zagłębie Lubin	Bytów
19:00 CEST (UTC+02:00)	Bąk 86'	Report		Stadium: Stadion MOSiR; Attendance: 1,280; Referee: Artur Aluszyk (Szczecin)

10 August 2016	Chojniczanka Chojnice	2–0	Stal Mielec	Chojnice
20:00 CEST (UTC+02:00)	Jakóbowski 35'; Kosakiewicz 81'	Report		Stadium: Stadion Miejski; Attendance: 800; Referee: Sylwester Rasmus (Toruń)

10 August 2016	Górnik Zabrze	3–2 (a.e.t.)	Legia Warsaw	Zabrze
20:30 CEST (UTC+02:00)	Kopacz 54', 105'; Kurzawa 61'	Report	Hämäläinen 37'; Nikolić 39'	Stadium: Ernest Pohl Stadium; Attendance: 16,542; Referee: Sebastian Krasny (Kraków)

11 August 2016	Stomil Olsztyn	0–0 (a.e.t.) (6–7 p)	Ruch Chorzów	Olsztyn
19:45 CEST (UTC+02:00)		Report		Stadium: Stadion OSiR; Attendance: 3,500; Referee: Dominik Sulikowski (Gdańsk)
	Penalties
	Kujawa (penalty scored); Jegliński (penalty scored); Czarnecki (penalty missed); Głowacki (penalty scored); Wełnicki (penalty scored); Kun (penalty scored); Ratajczak (penalty scored); Biedrzycki (penalty missed)		(penalty scored) Konczkowski; (penalty scored) Kowalczyk; (penalty missed) Nowak; (penalty scored) Walski; (penalty scored) Stępiński; (penalty scored) Cichocki; (penalty scored) Bargiel; (penalty scored) Moneta

24 August 2016	Piast Gliwice	0–0 (a.e.t.) (3–5 p)	Lechia Gdańsk	Gliwice
18:00 CEST (UTC+02:00)		Report		Stadium: Stadion Miejski; Attendance: 3,506; Referee: Tomasz Wajda (Żywiec)
	Penalties
	Murawski (penalty scored); Badía (penalty scored); Mráz (penalty missed); Korun (penalty scored)		(penalty scored) F. Paixão; (penalty scored) M. Paixão; (penalty scored) Kovačević; (penalty scored) Maloča; (penalty scored) Wawrzyniak

== Round of 16 ==
Competing in this round will the 16 winners from the previous round. The draw for this round was conducted at PGE Narodowy, Warsaw on 25 July 2016. Matches will be played on 20–28 September 2016. Hosts of matches between teams playing in the same tier were decided by a draw conducted on 12 August 2016.

Team 1	Score	Team 2
20 September 2016
Górnik Zabrze (2)	0–2	Wigry Suwałki (2)
GKS Jastrzębie (4)	1–1 (7–6 p)	Górnik Łęczna (1)
21 September 2016
Ruch Chorzów (1)	0–3	Lech Poznań (1)
Puszcza Niepołomice (3)	1–1 (4–2 p)	Lechia Gdańsk (1)
22 September 2016
KSZO Ostrowiec Świętokrzyski (4)	1–2	Arka Gdynia (1)
Bytovia Bytów (2)	3–0	Śląsk Wrocław (1)
27 September 2016
Chojniczanka Chojnice (2)	1–2	Wisła Kraków (1)
28 September 2016
Pogoń Szczecin (1)	4–1	Jagiellonia Białystok (1)

20 September 2016	GKS Jastrzębie	1–1 (a.e.t.) (7–6 p)	Górnik Łęczna	Jastrzębie-Zdrój
14:45 CEST (UTC+02:00)	Szymura 61'	Report	Pruchnik 90' (pen.)	Stadium: Stadion Miejski; Attendance: 967; Referee: Szymon Lizak (Poznań)
	Penalties
	Jadach (penalty scored); Szczęch (penalty scored); Szymura (penalty missed); Tront (penalty scored); Ali (penalty scored); Mazurkiewicz (penalty scored); Szczepan (penalty scored); Kulawiak (penalty scored)		(penalty scored) Dźwigała; (penalty scored) Pruchnik; (penalty missed) Piesio; (penalty scored) Danielewicz; (penalty scored) Śpiączka; (penalty scored) Sasin; (penalty scored) Grzelczak; (penalty missed) Jarecki

20 September 2016	Górnik Zabrze	0–2	Wigry Suwałki	Zabrze
20:30 CEST (UTC+02:00)		Report	Zapolnik 24'; Adamek 89'	Stadium: Ernest Pohl Stadium; Attendance: 7,126; Referee: Jacek Małyszek (Lublin)

21 September 2016	Puszcza Niepołomice	1–1 (a.e.t.) (4–2 p)	Lechia Gdańsk	Niepołomice
14:45 CEST (UTC+02:00)	Domański 86' (pen.)	Report	F. Paixão 66'	Stadium: Stadion Miejski; Attendance: 1,501; Referee: Piotr Lasyk (Bytom)
	Penalties
	Orłowski (penalty scored); Mikołajczyk (penalty missed); Uwakwe (penalty scored); Stawarczyk (penalty scored); Czarny (penalty scored)		(penalty scored) Wolski; (penalty missed) Krasić; (penalty scored) Kovačević; (penalty missed) Haraslín

21 September 2016	Ruch Chorzów	0–3	Lech Poznań	Chorzów
20:45 CEST (UTC+02:00)		Report	Robak 14'; Majewski 30'; Pawłowski 53'	Stadium: Stadion Miejski; Attendance: 4,816; Referee: Bartosz Frankowski (Toruń)

22 September 2016	KSZO Ostrowiec Świętokrzyski	1–2	Arka Gdynia	Ostrowiec Świętokrzyski
17:30 CEST (UTC+02:00)	Stachurski 75'	Report	Abbott 30'; Socha 41'	Stadium: Miejski Stadion Sportowy "KSZO"; Attendance: 4,000; Referee: Tomasz Wajda (Żywiec)

22 September 2016	Bytovia Bytów	3–0	Śląsk Wrocław	Bytów
20:30 CEST (UTC+02:00)	Opałacz 11'; Wróbel 33' (pen.); Klichowicz 67'	Report		Stadium: Stadion MOSiR; Attendance: 1,700; Referee: Łukasz Bednarek (Koszalin)

27 September 2016	Chojniczanka Chojnice	1–2	Wisła Kraków	Chojnice
17:45 CEST (UTC+02:00)	Mikita 5'	Report	Boguski 3'; Mączyński 76'	Stadium: Stadion Miejski; Attendance: 3,272; Referee: Zbigniew Dobrynin (Łódź)

28 September 2016	Pogoń Szczecin	4–1	Jagiellonia Białystok	Szczecin
17:45 CEST (UTC+02:00)	Frączczak 21' (pen.); Drygas 67'; Gyurcsó 86'; Nunes 89'	Report	Černych 36'	Stadium: Stadion Miejski im. Floriana Krygiera; Attendance: 3,826; Referee: Krzysztof Jakubik (Siedlce)

== Quarter-finals ==
The 8 winners from Round of 16 will compete in this round. The matches will be played in two legs. The first leg took place on 25–26 October 2016. The second leg took place on 29–30 November 2016. The draw for this round was conducted at PGE Narodowy, Warsaw on 25 July 2016. Host of first match between teams playing in the same tier were decided by a draw conducted on 29 September 2016.

Team 1	Agg.	Team 2	1st leg	2nd leg
GKS Jastrzębie (4)	2–3	Wigry Suwałki (2)	1–2	1–1
Bytovia Bytów (2)	2–2 (a)	Arka Gdynia (1)	2–1	0–1
Lech Poznań (1)	5–3	Wisła Kraków (1)	1–1	4–2
Puszcza Niepołomice (3)	1–4	Pogoń Szczecin (1)	1–2	0–2

=== First leg ===
25 October 2016	GKS Jastrzębie	1–2	Wigry Suwałki	Jastrzębie-Zdrój
14:00 CEST (UTC+02:00)	Caniboł 45' (pen.)	Report	Zapolnik 12'; Adamek 76'	Stadium: Stadion Miejski; Attendance: 1,370; Referee: Kornel Paszkiewicz (Wrocław)

25 October 2016	Bytovia Bytów	2–1	Arka Gdynia	Bytów
17:30 CEST (UTC+02:00)	Surdykowski 29'; Bąk 82'	Report	Abbott 85'	Stadium: Stadion MOSiR; Attendance: 1,800; Referee: Jarosław Przybył (Kluczbork)

25 October 2016	Lech Poznań	1–1	Wisła Kraków	Poznań
20:45 CEST (UTC+02:00)	Kownacki 78'	Report	Brożek 48'	Stadium: INEA Stadion; Attendance: 0 Referee: Tomasz Kwiatkowski (Warsaw)

26 October 2016	Puszcza Niepołomice	1–2	Pogoń Szczecin	Niepołomice
14:00 CEST (UTC+02:00)	Orłowski 84'	Report	Nunes 21'; Frączczak 56'	Stadium: Stadion Miejski; Attendance: 1,724; Referee: Sebastian Jarzębak (Bytom)

=== Second leg ===
30 November 2016	Wigry Suwałki	1–1 (3–2 agg.)	GKS Jastrzębie	Suwałki
17:30 CET (UTC+01:00)	Wroński 34'	Report	Tront 46'	Stadium: Stadion Miejski; Attendance: 1,533; Referee: Łukasz Bednarek (Koszalin)

29 November 2016	Arka Gdynia	1–0 (2 (a)–2 agg.)	Bytovia Bytów	Gdynia
20:30 CET (UTC+01:00)	Hofbauer 76'	Report		Stadium: Stadion GOSiR; Attendance: 3,117; Referee: Tomasz Musiał (Kraków)

30 November 2016	Wisła Kraków	2–4 (3–5 agg.)	Lech Poznań	Kraków
20:30 CET (UTC+01:00)	Brlek 51'; Małecki 66'	Report	Robak 21' (pen.); Makuszewski 28'; Jevtić 39'; Majewski 82'	Stadium: Stadion Miejski im. Henryka Reymana; Attendance: 10,507; Referee: Paweł Raczkowski (Warsaw)

29 November 2016	Pogoń Szczecin	2–0 (4–1 agg.)	Puszcza Niepołomice	Szczecin
17:30 CET (UTC+01:00)	Drygas 10'; Frączczak 54'	Report		Stadium: Stadion Florian Krygier; Attendance: 2,750; Referee: Zbigniew Dobrynin (Łódź)

== Semi-finals ==
The 4 winners from Quarterfinals will compete in this round. The matches will be played in two legs. The first legs took place on 28 February and 1 March 2017. The second legs took place on 4–5 April 2017. The draw for this round was conducted at Stadion Miejski im. Henryka Reymana, Kraków on 30 November 2016.

Team 1	Agg.	Team 2	1st leg	2nd leg
Lech Poznań (1)	4–0	Pogoń Szczecin (1)	3–0	1–0
Wigry Suwałki (2)	4–5	Arka Gdynia (1)	0–3	4–2

=== First leg ===
1 March 2017	Lech Poznań	3–0	Pogoń Szczecin	Poznań
20:00 CET (UTC+01:00)	Pawłowski 32'; Kownacki 53'; Nielsen 66'	Report		Stadium: INEA Stadion; Attendance: 14,537; Referee: Tomasz Kwiatkowski (Warsaw)

28 February 2017	Wigry Suwałki	0–3	Arka Gdynia	Suwałki
18:00 CET (UTC+01:00)		Report	Szwoch 37' (pen.); Siemaszko 68'; Formella 90+3'	Stadium: Stadion Miejski; Attendance: 3,066; Referee: Tomasz Musiał (Kraków)

=== Second leg ===
5 April 2017	Pogoń Szczecin	0–1 (0–4 agg.)	Lech Poznań	Szczecin
20:45 CEST (UTC+02:00)		Report	Robak 41'	Stadium: Stadion Florian Krygier; Attendance: 4,676; Referee: Zbigniew Dobrynin (Łódź)

4 April 2017	Arka Gdynia	2–4 (5–4 agg.)	Wigry Suwałki	Gdynia
18:00 CEST (UTC+02:00)	Szwoch 50' (pen.); Hofbauer 64'	Report	Kądzior 21', 79'; Zapolnik 45' (pen.); Santana 52'	Stadium: Stadion GOSiR; Attendance: 4,476; Referee: Wojciech Myć (Lublin)

== Final ==
The final match was played at the Stadion Narodowy, Warsaw on 2 May 2017. Host of the final match was decided by a draw conducted on 10 April 2017.

2 May 2017
16:00 CEST (UTC+02:00)

Lech Poznań	1–2 (a.e.t.)	Arka Gdynia
Trałka 119'	Report	Siemaszko 107'; Zarandia 111'

Stadion Narodowy, Warsaw
Attendance: 43,760
Referee: Tomasz Musiał (Kraków)

Lech Poznań	Arka Gdynia

GK	1	(Bosnia and Herzegovina) Jasmin Burić
RB	4	(Poland) Tomasz Kędziora
CB	35	(Poland) Jan Bednarek
CB	35	(Denmark) Lasse Nielsen		(substituted off) 110'
LB	22	(Ukraine) Volodymyr Kostevych
CM	6	(Poland) Łukasz Trałka (c)
CM	14	(Poland) Maciej Gajos
RM	10	(Switzerland) Darko Jevtić		(substituted off) 85'
AM	86	(Poland) Radosław Majewski
LM	24	(Poland) Dawid Kownacki		(substituted off) 74'
CF	11	(Poland) Marcin Robak	(yellow card) 50'
Substitutes:
GK	30	(Slovakia) Matúš Putnocký
MF	8	(Poland) Szymon Pawłowski		(substituted on) 85'
MF	17	(Poland) Maciej Makuszewski		(substituted on) 74'
MF	18	(Romania) Mihai Răduț		(substituted on) 110'
DF	26	(Poland) Maciej Wilusz
DF	28	(Poland) Marcin Wasielewski
MF	55	(Ghana) Abdul Aziz Tetteh
Manager:
(Croatia) Nenad Bjelica

GK	1	(Latvia) Pāvels Šteinbors
RB	2	(Poland) Tadeusz Socha
CB	3	(Poland) Krzysztof Sobieraj (c)
CB	29	(Poland) Michał Marcjanik
LB	23	(Poland) Marcin Warcholak
CM	6	(Poland) Antoni Łukasiewicz	(yellow card) 76'
CM	17	(Poland) Adam Marciniak
RM	8	(Brazil) Marcus da Silva	(yellow card) 53'	(substituted off) 55'
AM	10	(Poland) Mateusz Szwoch	(yellow card) 19'
LM	19	(Slovakia) Miroslav Božok		(substituted off) 83'
CF	26	(Poland) Przemysław Trytko		(substituted off) 71'
Substitutes:
GK	30	(Poland) Arkadiusz Moczadło
FW	11	(Poland) Rafał Siemaszko		(substituted on) 55'
MF	14	(Poland) Michał Nalepa
MF	20	(Austria) Dominik Hofbauer		(substituted on) 83'
DF	32	(Poland) Przemysław Stolc
DF	33	(Poland) Damian Zbozień
MF	45	(Georgia (country)) Luka Zarandia	(yellow card) 112'	(substituted on) 71'
Manager:
(Poland) Leszek Ojrzyński

Match officials:
Referee:
Tomasz Musiał
Assistant referees:
Sebastian Mucha
Jakub Ślusarski
Fourth official:
Bartosz Frankowski

Match rules

- 90 minutes.
- 30 minutes of extra-time if necessary.
- Penalty shoot-out if scores still level.
- Seven named substitutes.
- Maximum of three substitutions.

== Top goalscorers ==
Rank	Player	Club	Goals
1	(Poland) Rafał Jankowski	KKS Kalisz	4
1	(Poland) Kamil Zapolnik	Wigry Suwałki	4
3	(Poland) Kamil Adamek	Wigry Suwałki	3
3	(Poland) Adam Frączczak	Pogoń Szczecin	3
3	(Poland) Maciej Małkowski	Sandecja Nowy Sącz	3
3	(Poland) Marcin Robak	Lech Poznań	3
3	(Poland) Maciej Rożnowski	Wda Świecie	3
3	(Poland) Rafał Siemaszko	Arka Gdynia	3
3	(Poland) Szymon Sobczak	Stal Mielec	3
3	(Poland) Karol Zieliński	Kotwica Kołobrzeg	3

== See also ==
- 2016–17 Ekstraklasa
- 2016–17 I liga
