= 2020–21 I liga =

Polish football season

I liga
- Season: 2020–21
- Dates: 28 August 2020 – 13 June 2021
- Champions: Radomiak Radom
- Promoted: Radomiak Radom; Bruk-Bet Termalica Nieciecza; Górnik Łęczna
- Relegated: GKS Bełchatów
- Matches: 306
- Goals: 713 (2.33 per match)
- Top goalscorer: Roman Gergel (19 goals)
- Biggest home win: Miedź 4–0 Resovia (11 September 2020); Arka 4–0 Miedź (18 September 2020); Tychy 4–0 Chrobry (16 October 2020); ŁKS 4–0 Chrobry (7 November 2020); Puszcza 4–0 Arka (7 March 2021); Bruk-Bet Termalica 4–0 Puszcza (28 April 2021); Bruk-Bet Termalica 6–2 Korona (5 May 2021)
- Biggest away win: Stomil 0–5 Sandecja (3 April 2021)
- Highest scoring: ŁKS 4–4 Puszcza (22 November 2020)
- Longest winning run: 7 matches ŁKS Łódź; Bruk-Bet Termalica Nieciecza
- Longest unbeaten run: 15 matches Bruk-Bet Termalica Nieciecza
- Longest winless run: 15 matches GKS Bełchatów
- Longest losing run: 8 matches Sandecja Nowy Sącz; Puszcza Niepołomice
- Highest attendance: 8,750 (Note: Due to the COVID-19 pandemic, the match have been played with a limited number of spectators at maximum of 50% of stadium capacity.); Jastrzębie 0–1 Widzew (25 September 2020)
- Lowest attendance: 0 (Note: Matches have been played behind closed doors without any spectators.); All matches between 17 October 2020 and 15 May 2021 due to the COVID-19 pandemic.
- Total attendance: 201,526 (Note: Season total attendance after 110 matches (until 17 October 2020 and on 16 May 2021). All matches have been played with a limited number of spectators.)
- Average attendance: 1,832 (Note: Season total attendance after 110 matches (until 17 October 2020 and on 16 May 2021). All matches have been played with a limited number of spectators.) ▼8,5%

The 2020–21 I liga (currently named Fortuna I liga due to sponsorship reasons) was the 73rd season of the second tier domestic division in the Polish football league system since its establishment in 1949 and the 13th season of the Polish I liga under its current title. The league was operated by the PZPN.

The league was contested by 18 teams. The regular season was played in a round-robin tournament. The season started on 28 August 2020 and concluded on 13 June 2021 (regular season). Each team played a total of 34 matches, half at home and half away. After the 17th matchday the league went on a winter break between 14 December 2020 and 19 February 2021. Due to the COVID-19 pandemic, the 110 matches have been played with a limited number of spectators. The rest of the matches (until 17 October 2020 and on 16 May 2021) were played behind closed doors without any spectators.

== Changes from last season ==
The following teams have changed division since the 2019–20 season.

=== To I liga ===
Relegated from 2019–20 Ekstraklasa	Promoted from 2019–20 II liga
▼ Arka Gdynia ▼ Korona Kielce ▼ ŁKS Łódź	▲ Górnik Łęczna ▲ Widzew Łódź ▲ Resovia Rzeszów

=== From I liga ===
Promoted to 2020–21 Ekstraklasa	Relegated to 2020–21 II liga
▲ Stal Mielec ▲ Podbeskidzie Bielsko-Biała ▲ Warta Poznań	▼ Olimpia Grudziądz ▼ Chojniczanka Chojnice ▼ Wigry Suwałki

== Team overview ==
Location of teams and stadiums in 2020–21 I liga.

=== Stadiums and locations ===
Note: Table lists in alphabetical order.

Team	Location	Venue	Capacity
Arka Gdynia	Gdynia	Stadion GOSiR	15,139
Bruk-Bet Termalica Nieciecza	Nieciecza	Stadion Bruk-Bet	4,666
Chrobry Głogów	Głogów	Stadion GOS	2,817
GKS Bełchatów	Bełchatów	GIEKSA Arena	5,264
GKS Jastrzębie	Jastrzębie-Zdrój	Stadion Miejski	5,650
GKS Tychy	Tychy	Stadion Tychy	15,150
Górnik Łęczna	Łęczna	Stadion Górnika Łęczna	7,456
Korona Kielce	Kielce	Suzuki Arena	15,550
ŁKS Łódź	Łódź	Stadion im. Władysława Króla	5,700
Miedź Legnica	Legnica	Stadion Orła Białego	6,864
Odra Opole	Opole	Stadion Odry	4,560
Puszcza Niepołomice	Niepołomice	Stadion Puszczy	2,118
Radomiak Radom	Radom	Stadion im. Braci Czachorów	4,066
Resovia	Rzeszów	Stadion Stal^{1}	11,547
Sandecja Nowy Sącz	Nowy Sącz	Stadion im. Ojca Władysława Augustynka	2,988
Stomil Olsztyn	Olsztyn	Stadion OSiR	4,200
Widzew Łódź	Łódź	Stadion Widzewa	18,018
Zagłębie Sosnowiec	Sosnowiec	Stadion Ludowy	7,500

1. Due to the renovation of the Resovia Stadium in Rzeszów, Resovia will play their home games at Stadion Stal in Rzeszów. Originally they declared to play home matches at the Podkarpackie Centrum Piłki Nożnej in Stalowa Wola.

== League table ==
Pos	Team	Pld	W	D	L	GF	GA	GD	Pts	Promotion or Relegation
1	Radomiak Radom (C, P)	34	20	8	6	49	20	+29	68	Promotion to Ekstraklasa
2	Bruk-Bet Termalica Nieciecza (P)	34	18	11	5	56	28	+28	65	Promotion to Ekstraklasa
3	GKS Tychy	34	18	9	7	49	27	+22	63	Qualification for Promotion play-offs
4	Arka Gdynia	34	17	9	8	51	32	+19	60	Qualification for Promotion play-offs
5	ŁKS Łódź	34	17	7	10	59	41	+18	58	Qualification for Promotion play-offs
6	Górnik Łęczna (O, P)	34	15	11	8	47	30	+17	56	Qualification for Promotion play-offs
7	Miedź Legnica	34	13	12	9	49	36	+13	51	
8	Odra Opole	34	13	10	11	35	41	−6	49	
9	Widzew Łódź	34	11	13	10	30	36	−6	46	
10	Sandecja Nowy Sącz	34	12	9	13	42	50	−8	45	
11	Chrobry Głogów	34	12	8	14	34	45	−11	44	
12	Korona Kielce	34	11	8	15	31	46	−15	41	
13	Puszcza Niepołomice	34	10	7	17	32	46	−14	37	
14	GKS Jastrzębie	34	10	5	19	32	48	−16	35	
15	Stomil Olsztyn	34	9	8	17	31	48	−17	35	
16	Resovia Rzeszów	34	8	8	18	27	45	−18	32	
17	Zagłębie Sosnowiec	34	8	6	20	35	43	−8	30	
18	GKS Bełchatów (Note: GKS Bełchatów was punished with a deduction of 2 points for licensing process violating.) (R)	34	6	7	21	24	51	−27	23	Relegation to II liga

Updated to match(es) played on 3 June 2021. Source: 1liga.org, 90minut.pl
Rules for classification: 1) Points; 2) Head-to-head points; 3) Head-to-head goal difference; 4) Head-to-head away goals scored (only if two teams); 5) Goal difference; 6) Goals scored; 7) Games won; 8) Away games won; 9) PZPN draw.
(C) Champions; (O) Play-off winner; (P) Promoted; (R) Relegated

== Positions by round ==
Note: The list does not include the matches postponed to a later date. (Note: The list of postponed matches: Widzew Łódź - ŁKS Łódź (2nd round, played on 16 September 2020); Stomil Olsztyn - Odra Opole (2nd round, played on 16 September 2020); Chrobry Głogów - Radomiak Radom (2nd round, played on 16 September 2020); Górnik Łęczna - Arka Gdynia (3rd round, played on 21 October 2020); Radomiak Radom - Puszcza Niepołomice (4th round, played on 21 October 2020); Górnik Łęczna - GKS Jastrzębie (7th round, played on 11 November 2020); Radomiak Radom - GKS Tychy (8th round, played on 28 October 2020); Chrobry Głogów - Bruk-Bet Termalica Nieciecza (8th round, played on 4 November 2020); Puszcza Niepołomice - Górnik Łęczna (8th round, played on 18 November 2020); Zagłębie Sosnowiec - Resovia (9th round, played on 4 November 2020); ŁKS Łódź - Korona Kielce (9th round, played on 11 November 2020); Widzew Łódź - GKS Bełchatów (10th round, played on 10 November 2020); Chrobry Głogów - Odra Opole (10th round, played on 18 November 2020); Resovia - Sandecja Nowy Sącz (10th round, played on 18 November 2020); Korona Kielce - Stomil Olsztyn (10th round, played on 18 November 2020); Radomiak Radom - ŁKS Łódź (10th round, played on 18 November 2020); Arka Gdynia - Zagłębie Sosnowiec (10th round, played on 18 November 2020); Puszcza Niepołomice - Bruk-Bet Termalica Nieciecza (10th round, played on 25 November 2020); Sandecja Nowy Sącz - GKS Jastrzębie (15th round, played on 9 December 2020); Odra Opole - Bruk-Bet Termalica Nieciecza (15th round, played on 9 December 2020); Resovia - Radomiak Radom (15th round, played on 9 December 2020); Widzew Łódź - Korona Kielce (16th round, played on 20 February 2021); Odra Opole - Widzew Łódź (17th round, played on 10 March 2021); ŁKS Łódź - GKS Tychy (17th round, played on 20 February 2021); Puszcza Niepołomice - Radomiak Radom (21st round, played on 14 April 2021); Arka Gdynia - Bruk-Bet Termalica Nieciecza (22nd round, played on 21 April 2021); Bruk-Bet Termalica Nieciecza - Korona Kielce (23rd round, played on 5 May 2021); Radomiak Radom - Bruk-Bet Termalica Nieciecza (24th round, played on 12 May 2021); GKS Jastrzębie - Miedź Legnica (25th round, played on 5 May 2021); Bruk-Bet Termalica Nieciecza - Chrobry Głogów (25th round, played on 19 May 2021); Puszcza Niepołomice - Miedź Legnica (26th round, played on 19 May 2021); Arka Gdynia - Sandecja Nowy Sącz (28th round, played on 19 May 2021))

The place taken by the team that played fewer matches than the opponents was underlined.

Team ╲ Round	1	2	3	4	5	6	7	8	9	10	11	12	13	14	15	16	17	18	19	20	21	22	23	24	25	26	27	28	29	30	31	32	33	34
Radomiak Radom	3	6	6	5	6	8	9	10	10	8	7	7	6	4	5	6	4	6	6	5	6	5	5	5	5	4	3	3	3	3	2	2	1	1
Bruk-Bet Termalica	7	3	1	2	4	2	2	3	2	2	1	2	1	1	1	1	1	1	1	1	1	1	1	1	1	1	1	1	1	1	1	1	2	2
GKS Tychy	10	13	9	10	7	6	7	7	6	5	5	4	7	7	6	5	7	4	4	4	4	4	4	4	3	5	5	2	2	2	3	3	3	3
Arka Gdynia	1	1	3	3	2	5	4	4	4	6	6	6	4	5	4	4	5	5	5	6	5	6	6	6	6	6	6	6	4	4	4	4	4	4
ŁKS Łódź	1	5	2	1	1	1	1	1	1	1	2	1	2	2	2	2	2	2	3	3	3	3	3	3	4	3	2	5	5	5	5	5	5	5
Górnik Łęczna	5	2	5	4	3	4	5	5	5	3	3	3	3	3	3	3	3	3	2	2	2	2	2	2	2	2	4	4	6	6	6	6	6	6
Miedź Legnica	6	9	4	8	8	7	6	6	7	7	8	11	10	9	8	7	6	7	7	7	7	8	8	8	10	11	10	9	7	7	7	7	7	7
Odra Opole	16	17	12	6	5	3	3	2	3	4	4	5	5	6	7	8	8	8	10	8	9	9	10	10	7	8	7	8	8	8	8	8	8	8
Widzew Łódź	14	14	18	13	11	12	14	9	9	10	11	8	11	11	12	13	13	9	11	9	8	7	7	7	8	9	8	7	10	10	10	11	11	9
Sandecja Nowy Sącz	13	14	16	17	18	18	18	18	18	18	18	18	18	18	18	17	16	14	15	14	14	13	13	12	11	7	9	10	9	11	11	10	9	10
Chrobry Głogów	8	10	8	7	9	9	10	11	12	12	14	13	12	13	13	9	10	10	9	11	10	12	11	13	13	12	12	11	11	9	9	9	10	11
Korona Kielce	8	4	7	9	10	13	11	13	13	13	10	10	9	8	9	10	11	12	13	12	11	11	12	11	12	13	13	12	12	12	12	12	12	12
Puszcza Niepołomice	15	16	14	15	12	10	8	8	8	9	9	9	8	10	10	12	9	11	8	10	12	10	9	9	9	10	11	13	13	13	13	13	14	13
GKS Jastrzębie	16	18	17	18	17	17	17	17	17	17	17	17	17	15	16	15	14	15	14	15	15	15	16	16	17	17	17	16	16	15	16	17	15	14
Stomil Olsztyn	10	11	13	16	13	11	12	12	11	11	13	14	14	12	11	11	12	13	12	13	13	14	14	14	14	14	14	14	14	14	14	14	13	15
Resovia	4	8	11	12	15	15	16	16	16	16	16	16	16	17	17	18	18	18	18	17	16	16	17	15	15	15	15	15	15	16	15	16	16	16
Zagłębie Sosnowiec	12	7	10	11	14	14	13	14	14	14	15	15	15	16	15	16	17	17	17	18	18	17	15	17	16	16	16	17	17	17	15	17	17	17
GKS Bełchatów	18	12	15	14	16	16	15	15	15	15	12	12	13	14	14	14	15	16	16	16	17	18	18	18	18	18	18	18	18	18	18	18	18	18

I liga champion Promotion to Ekstraklasa
Promotion to Ekstraklasa
Qualification for promotion play-offs
Relegation to II liga

Source: 90minut.pl

== Results ==
Home \ Away	ARK	BBT	GŁO	BEŁ	JAS	TYC	GÓR	KOR	ŁKS	MLE	ODR	PNI	RAD	RES	SNS	STO	WID	ZSO
Arka Gdynia	—	1–1	1–1	1–2	1–0	0–2	0–2	1–0	0–0	4–0	1–1	3–2	0–2	1–0	3–0	2–0	0–0	2–0
Bruk-Bet Termalica Nieciecza	0–1	—	0–0	2–0	2–0	0–0	2–1	6–2	2–0	0–2	1–1	4–0	3–2	2–0	2–2	0–0	2–0	1–0
Chrobry Głogów	0–3	0–2	—	0–1	1–0	1–0	1–1	1–1	1–0	0–0	2–3	0–2	1–2	3–0	0–2	3–0	3–0	1–0
GKS Bełchatów	0–3	1–2	1–2	—	0–2	1–1	1–2	0–1	1–3	1–0	1–1	0–2	0–1	3–0	0–2	2–3	2–3	1–0
GKS Jastrzębie	0–4	0–0	0–1	3–2	—	0–1	1–1	2–0	0–3	1–2	3–0	1–2	0–1	2–1	1–1	2–0	0–1	2–1
GKS Tychy	1–0	0–2	4–0	0–0	3–1	—	3–1	0–1	1–1	0–2	2–0	1–1	1–0	2–1	2–0	0–0	2–1	3–1
Górnik Łęczna	2–0	3–3	3–0	3–0	2–1	1–1	—	0–1	2–0	1–0	1–1	0–0	2–1	2–0	3–0	1–1	0–0	4–1
Korona Kielce	3–3	0–3	2–2	3–0	3–2	1–0	0–2	—	1–2	0–0	0–2	1–0	0–2	1–0	1–0	1–3	1–1	1–0
ŁKS Łódź	1–2	3–2	4–0	1–0	1–1	0–3	3–1	2–0	—	3–4	2–1	4–4	1–1	2–1	4–1	3–0	2–2	0–0
Miedź Legnica	1–2	2–3	2–2	3–0	1–1	2–3	1–0	1–1	3–0	—	4–2	1–1	0–1	4–0	3–1	2–2	1–1	1–1
Odra Opole	0–0	1–0	3–1	1–0	0–2	1–5	1–1	1–0	0–4	2–1	—	1–0	1–1	1–0	1–1	1–2	0–0	1–0
Puszcza Niepołomice	4–0	0–0	2–0	2–0	2–1	0–1	1–0	0–0	2–3	0–1	1–0	—	0–4	0–3	0–1	0–2	1–0	0–4
Radomiak Radom	0–0	0–1	1–2	2–0	2–0	2–2	3–0	2–0	1–0	0–2	1–0	2–0	—	3–1	3–0	1–0	4–1	0–0
Resovia	1–2	3–1	1–0	1–3	1–2	0–0	0–2	1–1	1–0	0–0	1–1	2–1	0–0	—	0–0	1–0	2–0	1–2
Sandecja Nowy Sącz	1–5	0–1	1–1	0–0	3–0	2–1	1–1	2–1	2–1	2–0	1–2	2–1	1–1	1–1	—	1–4	3–1	2–1
Stomil Olsztyn	1–1	1–4	1–2	0–0	0–1	1–2	2–1	2–0	0–2	1–1	0–1	2–1	0–1	1–1	0–5	—	0–1	1–0
Widzew Łódź	2–1	1–1	1–0	0–0	2–0	0–2	0–0	2–0	0–2	0–0	2–1	0–0	1–1	2–0	2–1	2–0	—	1–1
Zagłębie Sosnowiec	2–3	1–1	1–2	1–1	3–0	3–0	0–1	1–3	1–2	0–2	0–2	2–0	0–1	0–2	3–0	2–1	3–0	—

Source: 1 liga.org, 90minut.pl
Legend: Blue = home team win; Yellow = draw; Red = away team win.
For upcoming matches, an "a" indicates there is an article about the rivalry between the two participants.

== Results by round ==
Team ╲ Round	1	2	3	4	5	6	7	8	9	10	11	12	13	14	15	16	17	18	19	20	21	22	23	24	25	26	27	28	29	30	31	32	33	34
Arka	W	W	W	W	L	D	D	D	L	W	L	W	W	L	W	D	D	W	L	L	W	L	D	W	D	W	W	W	W	W	D	D	L	W
Bruk-Bet Termalica	W	W	W	W	L	W	W	W	W	W	W	W	D	D	W	D	W	D	D	W	L	D	D	W	D	W	L	W	D	D	W	L	L	D
Chrobry	D	W	L	W	L	D	D	L	L	L	W	L	W	L	W	W	D	D	W	L	W	L	L	D	W	L	W	W	W	D	D	L	L	L
GKS Bełchatów	L	W	L	D	L	L	D	W	D	W	D	W	L	L	L	L	L	L	L	L	D	D	L	L	D	L	L	W	L	L	L	W	L	L
GKS Jastrzębie	L	L	L	L	L	L	D	L	L	W	L	L	W	W	W	L	W	L	W	L	L	L	L	D	D	L	W	L	D	W	L	D	W	W
GKS Tychy	D	L	W	D	W	W	L	W	W	D	D	D	L	D	W	W	W	W	W	L	D	D	W	L	W	L	W	W	W	W	L	W	W	D
Górnik	W	W	W	W	D	D	W	W	L	W	D	L	D	W	L	W	D	W	W	W	L	L	W	D	D	D	L	D	L	D	L	D	W	W
Korona	D	W	D	L	D	L	W	L	W	L	W	L	W	W	L	L	L	D	L	W	W	D	W	L	L	L	W	L	L	W	D	D	D	L
ŁKS	W	W	W	W	W	W	W	D	W	W	W	L	D	L	L	L	L	W	D	W	D	L	W	L	L	W	D	L	D	W	W	L	W	D
Miedź	W	L	W	L	D	W	D	D	D	L	D	L	W	W	W	D	W	L	W	D	L	D	L	D	W	D	W	W	L	W	L	W	D	D
Odra	L	W	W	W	W	W	D	W	D	L	L	W	D	L	L	D	L	L	D	W	D	D	D	D	W	L	W	L	W	D	W	W	L	L
Puszcza	L	L	D	W	W	W	D	L	D	W	W	D	D	L	L	W	W	L	W	L	W	W	L	D	L	D	L	L	L	L	L	L	L	W
Radomiak	W	W	W	L	L	L	D	W	D	W	D	W	D	W	D	D	W	D	L	W	W	W	W	L	W	D	W	W	L	W	W	W	W	W
Resovia	W	L	L	L	L	L	L	D	W	L	L	D	L	L	L	D	L	W	L	D	W	D	D	W	W	L	D	L	W	L	D	L	W	L
Sandecja	L	L	L	L	L	L	L	L	D	L	L	D	D	W	W	W	D	W	D	W	D	W	W	W	W	W	D	W	L	L	D	D	W	L
Stomil	D	L	L	L	W	W	D	D	D	L	L	W	L	W	W	D	L	L	W	L	L	L	L	W	L	L	W	L	L	L	W	D	D	D
Widzew	L	L	L	W	W	D	L	W	D	D	D	W	L	W	w	W	D	D	D	W	W	W	L	D	L	D	W	D	L	D	D	L	D	W
Zagłębie	L	W	L	L	L	D	W	L	L	L	D	L	L	L	W	L	L	D	L	L	D	W	W	L	D	W	L	L	L	L	W	W	L	D

Source: 1 liga.org
W = Win; D = Draw; L = Loss

== Promotion play-offs ==
I liga play-offs for the 2020–21 season will be played in June 2021. The teams who finished in 3rd, 4th, 5th and 6th place are set to compete. The fixtures are determined by final league position – 3rd team of regular season vs 6th team of regular season and 4th team of regular season vs 5th team of regular season. The winner of final match will be promoted to Ekstraklasa for next season. All matches will be played in a stadiums of team which occupied higher position in regular season.

Semi-finals; 16 June
4	Arka Gdynia	0
5	ŁKS Łódź	1
3	GKS Tychy	1 (2)
6	Górnik Łęczna	1 (4)

Final; 20 June
5	ŁKS Łódź	0
6	Górnik Łęczna	1

16 June 2021
18:00 CEST

GKS Tychy	1–1 (a.e.t.)	Górnik Łęczna
Piątek 3'	Report	Mak 87'
Penalties
Lewicki (penalty missed); Moneta (penalty scored); Nedić (penalty scored); Paprzycki (penalty missed)	2–4	(penalty missed) Wojciechowski; (penalty scored) Leândro; (penalty scored) Midzierski; (penalty scored) Matei; (penalty scored) Jagiełło

Stadion Miejski, Tychy
Attendance: 3,550
Referee: Daniel Stefański (Bydgoszcz)
16 June 2021
20:45 CEST

Arka Gdynia	0–1	ŁKS Łódź
	Report	Pirulo 64'

Stadion Miejski, Gdynia
Attendance: 3,462
Referee: Szymon Marciniak (Płock)

20 June 2021
20:40 CEST

ŁKS Łódź	0–1	Górnik Łęczna
	Report	Krykun 12'

Stadion Miejski im. Władysława Króla, Łódź
Attendance: 2,621
Referee: Jarosław Przybył (Kluczbork)

== Top goalscorers ==
Rank	Player	Club	Goals
1	(Slovakia) Roman Gergel	Bruk-Bet Termalica Nieciecza	19
2	(Poland) Karol Angielski	Radomiak Radom	13
3	(Spain) Pirulo	ŁKS Łódź	12
3	(Poland) Daniel Rumin	GKS Jastrzębie	12
5	(Poland) Kamil Zapolnik	Miedź Legnica	11
6	(Spain) Antonio Domínguez	ŁKS Łódź	10
6	(Poland) Juliusz Letniowski	Arka Gdynia	10
6	(Poland) Maciej Rosołek	Arka Gdynia	10
9	(Poland) Mikołaj Lebedyński	Chrobry Głogów	9
9	(Spain) Joan Román	Miedź Legnica	9
9	(Poland) Łukasz Sekulski	ŁKS Łódź	9
9	(Poland) Bartosz Śpiączka	Górnik Łęczna	9
9	(Poland) Paweł Wojciechowski	Górnik Łęczna	9

== Attendances ==
Pos	Team	Total	High	Low	Average	Change
1	Widzew Łódź	40,770	8,500	4,154	5,824	−57.5%^{2}
2	Arka Gdynia	23,739	3,691	2,717	3,391	−43.7%^{1}
3	GKS Tychy	20,672	4,245	1,519	2,953	−7.7%
4	Korona Kielce	16,561	3,550	0	2,365	−48.0%^{1}
5	ŁKS Łódź	10,478	2,621	1,305	2,095	−52.2%^{1}
6	GKS Jastrzębie	11,305 (Note: Match GKS Jastrzębie 0–1 Widzew Łódź played on 25 September 2020 took place on Stadion Widzewa, Łódź. GKS Jastrzębie was host of the match. Attendance - 8750 spectators. The attendance has been included in GKS Jastrzębie result.)	8,750	0	1,884	+25.6%
7	Miedź Legnica	15,053	2,900	1,049	1,672	−38.1%
8	Resovia Rzeszów	3,282	2,068	1,214	1,641	+36.7%^{2}
9	Górnik Łęczna	7,816	1,496	940	1,302	+8.5%^{2}
10	Radomiak Radom	6,354	4,009	180	1,270	−60.3%
11	Bruk-Bet Termalica Nieciecza	9,956	1,692	575	1,244	−22.3%
12	Zagłębie Sosnowiec	6,206	2,048	674	1,241	−22.4%
13	Odra Opole	10,153	1,945	678	1,128	+12.8%
14	Stomil Olsztyn	5,855	1,381	0	836	−53.6%
15	GKS Bełchatów	4,017	1,740	480	803	−46.5%
16	Chrobry Głogów	4,029	1,055	0	503	−28.1%
17	Puszcza Niepołomice	3,449	793	138	383	−45.3%
18	Sandecja Nowy Sącz	1,931	755	0	321	−67.9%
	League total	201,626	8,750	0	1,714	−9.3%

Updated to games played on 13 June 2021.
Source: 90minut.pl (in Polish)
Notes:
1. Team played last season in Ekstraklasa.
2. Team played last season in II liga.

== See also ==
- 2020–21 Ekstraklasa
- 2020–21 II liga
- 2020–21 III liga
- 2020–21 Polish Cup
- 2020 Polish SuperCup
