= Porębski =

Porębski is a Polish surname. Notable people with the surname include:

- Jerzy Porębski (born 1956), Polish director
- Kazimierz Porębski (1872–1933), Polish naval officer
- Mieczysław Porębski (1921–2012), Polish art historian
- Olgierd Porebski (1922–1995), British fencer
- Przemysław Porębski (born 1998), Polish footballer
- Tomasz Porębski (born 1980), Polish rally driver
- Tomasz Porębski (footballer), Polish footballer
