= Budzyński =

Budzynski or Budzyński (feminine: Budzyńska; plural: Budzyńscy) is a Polish surname. It may refer to:

- Dominik Budzyński (born 1992), Polish footballer
- Eugeniusz Budzyński (1893–1940), Polish physician
- Michał Budzyński (born 1988), Polish footballer
- Robert Budzynski (1994–2023), French footballer
- Roman Budzyński (1933–1994), Polish sprinter
- Stanisław Budzyński, Polish amanuensis
- Thomas Budzynski (1933–2011), American psychologist
- Tomasz Budzyński (born 1962), Polish musician
- Wiktor Budzyński (1888–1976), Polish politician
- Wincenty Budzyński (1815–1866), Polish activist and chess master

== See also ==
- Budzinski
