= Uwakwe =

Uwakwe is a surname. Notable people with the surname include:

- Charles Uwakwe, Nigerian professor
- Longinus Uwakwe (born 1987), Nigerian footballer
- Tariq Uwakwe (born 1999), English footballer
- Uchechukwu Uwakwe (born 1979), Nigerian footballer
