= Tomasz Porębski (footballer) =

Polish footballer

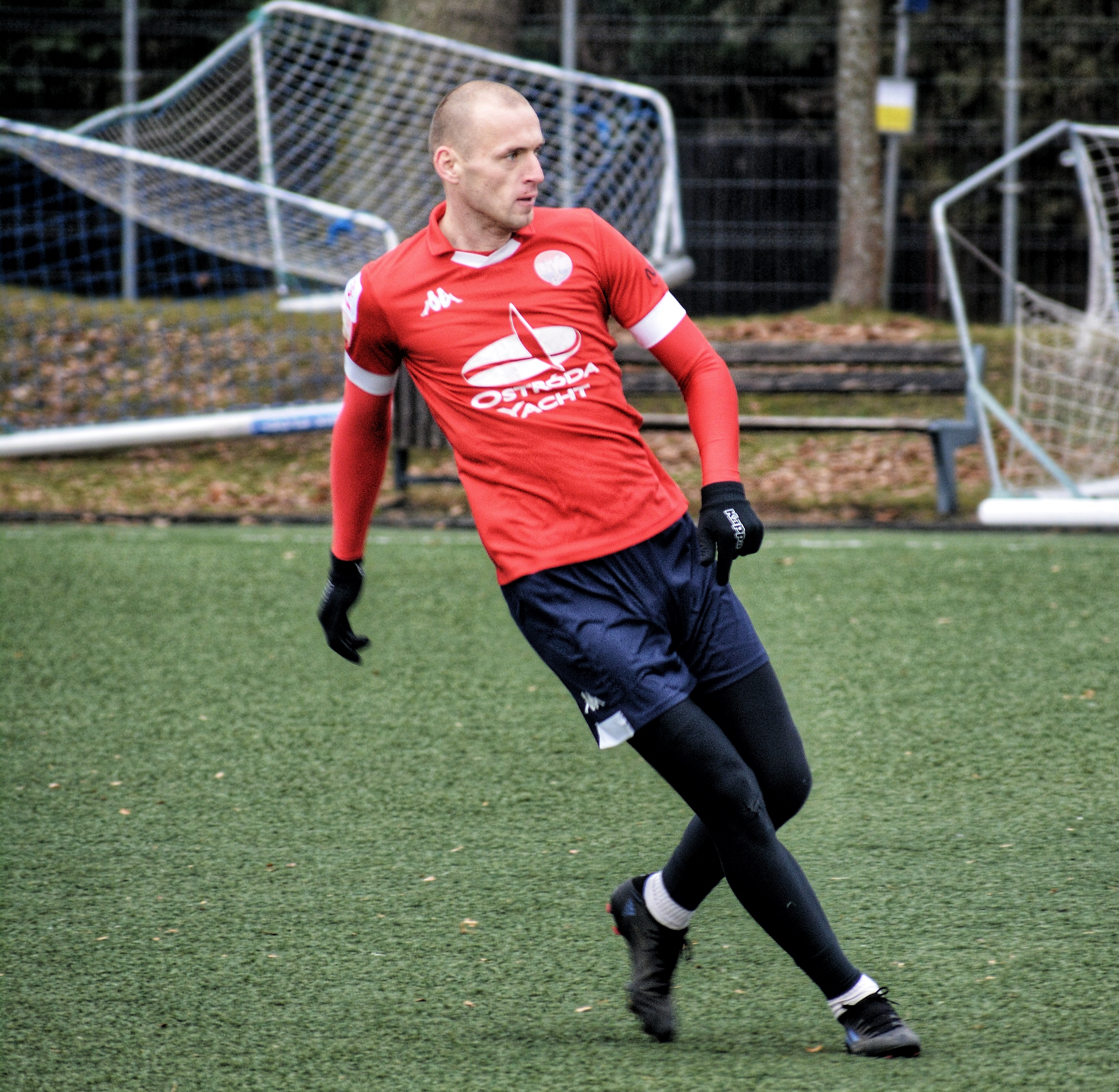
- Porębski with Sokół Ostróda in 2023

Personal information
- Date of birth: 12 January 1992 (age 34)
- Place of birth: Białystok, Poland
- Height: 1.95 m (6 ft 5 in)
- Position: Defender

Team information
- Current team: KS Wasilków
- Number: 24

Youth career
- Jagiellonia Białystok

Senior career*
Years	Team	Apps	(Gls)
2011–2015	Jagiellonia Białystok	21	(1)
2014	→ Wigry Suwałki (loan)	7	(0)
2015	→ GKS Tychy (loan)	3	(0)
2015–2016	Olimpia Zambrów	17	(0)
2016	Mazur Ełk	6	(1)
2017–2018	Tur Bielsk Podlaski	24	(2)
2018–2019	Olimpia Zambrów	3	(0)
2019–2020	FC Blaubeuren 1995	20	(0)
2020–2022	Ruch Wysokie Mazowieckie	48	(4)
2022–2023	Sokół Ostróda	32	(2)
2023–2026	Znicz Biała Piska	62	(7)
2026–	KS Wasilków	9	(1)
- * Club domestic league appearances and goals as of 23:42, 3 June 2026 (UTC)

Tomasz Porębski (born 12 January 1992) is a Polish professional footballer who plays as a defender for IV liga Podlasie club KS Wasilków.

== Career ==
In July 2015, Porębski joined Olimpia Zambrów. He played 17 league games for the club, then a year later joined Mazur Ełk. He then played for Tur Bielsk Podlaski in the 2017–18 season, with his former club Olimpia Zambrów in the 2018–19 season, before moving to Germany and signing with FC Blaubeuren 1995 in February 2019.

== Honours ==
Wigry Suwałki

- II liga East: 2013–14

Tur Bielsk Podlaski

- Polish Cup (Podlasie regionals): 2017–18

Ruch Wysokie Mazowieckie

- Polish Cup (Podlasie regionals): 2019–20

Znicz Biała Piska

- IV liga Warmia-Masuria: 2024–25
