= Mateusz Słodowy =

Polish footballer

Personal information
- Full name: Mateusz Słodowy
- Date of birth: 8 August 1991 (age 35)
- Place of birth: Wodzisław Śląski, Poland
- Height: 1.84 m (6 ft 0 in)
- Position: Defender

Team information
- Current team: Unia Turza Śląska

Youth career
- 2008–2009: Odra Wodzisław

Senior career*
Years	Team	Apps	(Gls)
2009–2010	Odra Wodzisław	10	(0)
2009–2010	→ Kolejarz Stróże (loan)	14	(0)
2010–2013	Viktoria Žižkov	39	(1)
2013–2015	Górnik Zabrze	14	(0)
2013–2014	→ Energetyk ROW Rybnik (loan)	13	(0)
2016–2017	Polonia Bytom	41	(1)
2017–2019	Kotwica Kołobrzeg	46	(1)
2019–2020	Odra Wodzisław	15	(0)
2020–2023	GKS Jastrzębie	71	(1)
2023–2025	Odra Wodzisław	64	(5)
2025–	Unia Turza Śląska	0	(0)

International career
2011–2012	Poland U20	4	(0)
- * Club domestic league appearances and goals as of 14:24, 23 June 2025 (UTC)

Mateusz Słodowy (born 8 August 1991) is a Polish professional footballer who plays as a defender for IV liga Silesia club Unia Turza Śląska.
