= Maciej Małkowski =

Polish footballer (born 1985)

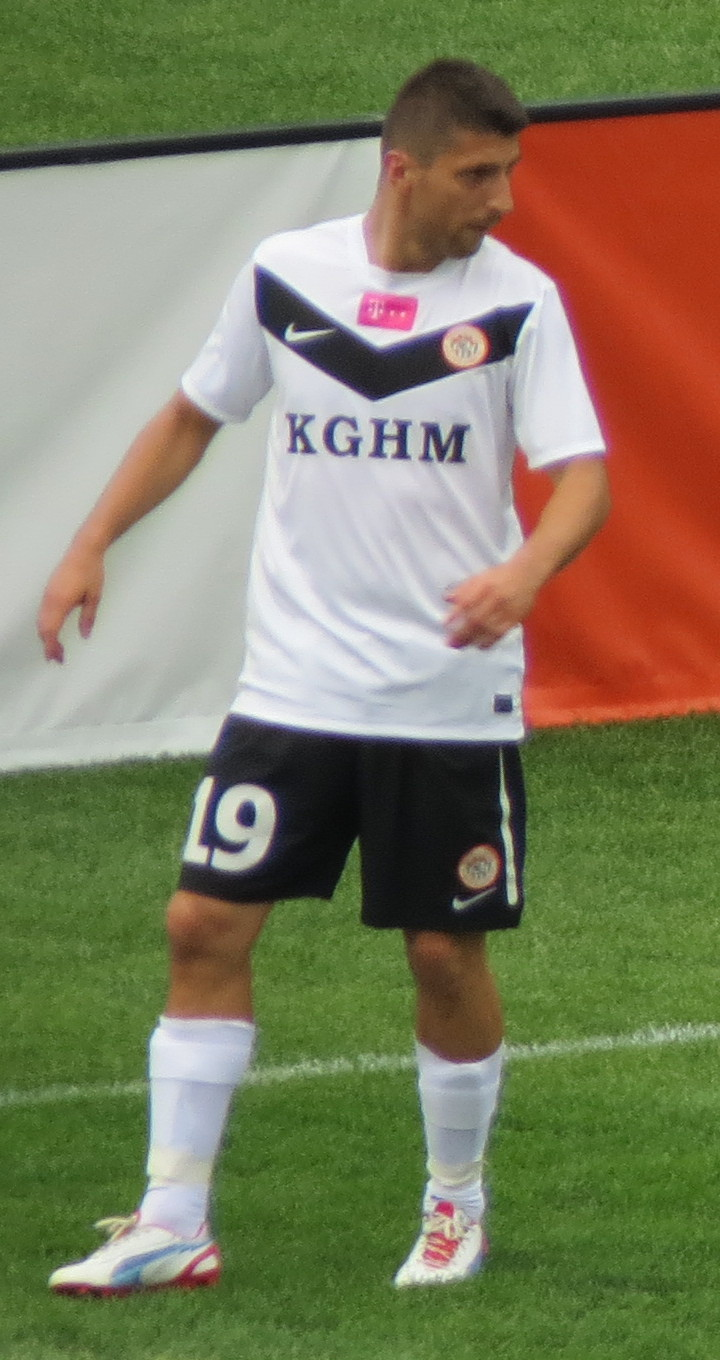
- Małkowski with Zagłębie Lubin in 2012

Personal information
- Date of birth: 19 March 1985 (age 41)
- Place of birth: Jastrzębie-Zdrój, Poland
- Height: 1.70 m (5 ft 7 in)
- Position: Midfielder

Team information
- Current team: Podbeskidzie Bielsko-Biała (assistant)

Youth career
- 2003–2004: MOSiR Jastrzębie-Zdrój

Senior career*
Years	Team	Apps	(Gls)
2004–2008	GKS Jastrzębie	113	(9)
2008–2009	Odra Wodzisław Śląski	30	(3)
2009–2011	GKS Bełchatów	53	(6)
2011–2013	Zagłębie Lubin	45	(5)
2013–2014	Górnik Zabrze	26	(1)
2015	GKS Bełchatów	15	(1)
2015–2022	Sandecja Nowy Sącz	162	(32)
2022	Barciczanka Barcice	13	(12)
2022–2023	Szczakowianka Jaworzno	28	(2)
2023–2024	Zagłębie Sosnowiec II	25	(1)
Total		510	(72)

International career
2008–2009	Poland	2	(0)
- * Club domestic league appearances and goals

Maciej Małkowski (born 19 March 1985) is a Polish former professional footballer who played as a midfielder. He is currently the assistant coach of I liga club Podbeskidzie Bielsko-Biała.

== Club career ==
In June 2011, Małkowski joined Zagłębie Lubin on a two-year contract.

== International career ==
Małkowski made his debut for the Poland national team in a 1–0 friendly win over Serbia on 14 December 2008.

== Career statistics ==
=== International ===
Appearances and goals by national team and year
National team	Year	Apps	Goals
Poland
Poland	2008	1	0
Poland	2009	1	0
Total		2	0

== Honours ==
Sandecja Nowy Sącz

- I liga: 2016–17

Barciczanka Barcice

- Regional league Nowy Sącz I: 2021–22

Szczakowianka Jaworzno

- IV liga Silesia I: 2022–23

Zagłębie Sosnowiec II

- Polish Cup (Sosnowiec regionals): 2023–24
