= Jamróz =

Jamróz, Jamroż or Jamroz, is a Polish surname. Notable people with the surname include:

- Adam Jamróz (born 1945), Polish jurist
- Anna Jamróz (born 1988), Polish model
- Bartłomiej Jamróz (born 1973), Polish footballer
- Dorota Jamróz (born 1983), Polish footballer
- Dorota Jamroz (born 1939), Polish zootechnician
- Franciszek Jamroż (1943–2023), Polish politician
- Jan Jamróz (1905–1962), Polish Army officer
- Łukasz Jamróz (born 1990), Polish footballer
- Małgorzata Jamróz (1973–2022), Polish sprinter
- Wincenty Jamróz (1875–1933), Polish farmer and activist
