= Kamil Jadach =

Polish footballer (born 1990)

Personal information
- Date of birth: 23 May 1990 (age 36)
- Place of birth: Jastrzębie-Zdrój, Poland
- Height: 1.70 m (5 ft 7 in)
- Positions: Midfielder; forward

Team information
- Current team: GKS Jastrzębie

Youth career
- –2009: MOSiR Jastrzębie

Senior career*
Years	Team	Apps	(Gls)
2009–2024	GKS Jastrzębie	393	(54+)
2026–	GKS Jastrzębie	0	(0)
- * Club domestic league appearances and goals as of 17:41, 2 September 2026 (UTC)

Kamil Jadach (born 23 May 1990) is a Polish professional footballer who has played solely for GKS Jastrzębie as a midfielder or forward, and is the most capped player in the club's history.

== Career ==
As a youth player, Jadach joined the youth academy of MOSiR Jastrzębie.

He started his career with GKS Jastrzębie, helping them achieve promotion from the Polish sixth division to the Polish second division within seven seasons.

On 17 August 2024, he made his 393rd and final league appearance for the club, coming onto the pitch as an injury-time substitute in a 4–2 loss to Polonia Bytom. With that, he broke Andrzej Myśliwiec's record for the most league games played for GKS. Following the match, he retired from professional football.

On 2 September 2026, Jadach returned to GKS, to help rebuild the club following a restructure and relegation to the Klasa B, the lowest tier of Polish league football.

== Honours ==
GKS Jastrzębie

- II liga: 2017–18
- III liga, group III: 2016–17
- IV liga Silesia II: 2013–14
- Regional league, group Katowice III: 2010–11
- Polish Cup (Silesia regionals): 2015–16
- Polish Cup (Rybnik regionals): 2011–12, 2014–15, 2015–16
