= Szymura =

Szymura is a Polish surname. It may refer to:

- Franciszek Szymura (1912–1985), Polish boxer
- Kamil Szymura (born 1990), Polish footballer
- Rafał Szymura (born 1995), Polish volleyball player
- Jacek M. Szymura (born 1949), Polish zoologist and evolutionary biologist
