= Mateusz Cichocki =

Polish footballer

Personal information
- Full name: Mateusz Cichocki
- Date of birth: 31 January 1992 (age 34)
- Place of birth: Warsaw, Poland
- Height: 1.87 m (6 ft 2 in)
- Position: Centre-back

Team information
- Current team: Radomiak Radom
- Number: 16

Youth career
- 1997–2000: Polfa Tarchomin
- 2000–2008: GKP Targówek
- 2008–2012: Legia Warsaw

Senior career*
Years	Team	Apps	(Gls)
2012–2015	Legia Warsaw	4	(0)
2012–2013	→ Dolcan Ząbki (loan)	14	(0)
2014	→ Arka Gdynia (loan)	13	(0)
2014–2015	→ Dolcan Ząbki (loan)	32	(0)
2015–2017	Ruch Chorzów	27	(0)
2017–2019	Zagłębie Sosnowiec	54	(1)
2019–	Radomiak Radom	152	(3)

International career
2013	Poland U20	1	(0)
2012–2013	Poland U21	2	(0)
- * Club domestic league appearances and goals as of 22:34, 29 May 2026 (UTC)

Mateusz Cichocki (born 31 January 1992) is a Polish professional footballer who plays as a centre-back for Ekstraklasa club Radomiak Radom.

== Career ==
=== Radomiak Radom ===
On 29 May 2019, it was confirmed that Cichocki had joined I liga club Radomiak Radom after two seasons with Zagłębie Sosnowiec.

== Honours ==
Legia Warsaw

- Ekstraklasa: 2013–14

Radomiak Radom

- I liga: 2020–21
