= Antoni Łukasiewicz =

Polish footballer (born 1983)

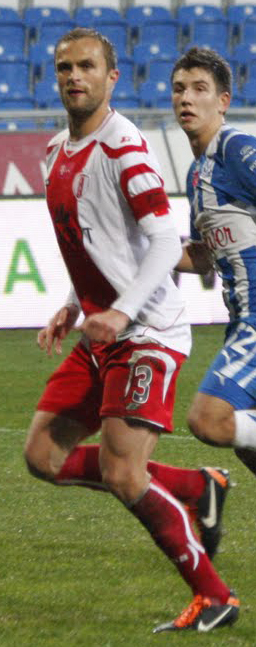

Personal information
- Full name: Antoni Łukasiewicz
- Date of birth: 26 June 1983 (age 43)
- Place of birth: Warsaw, Poland
- Height: 1.88 m (6 ft 2 in)
- Position: Defender

Senior career*
Years	Team	Apps	(Gls)
2002–2006	Polonia Warsaw	80	(0)
2006–2008	Elche	15	(0)
2007–2008	→ União de Leiria (loan)	13	(0)
2008–2012	Śląsk Wrocław	58	(1)
2011	→ ŁKS Łódź (loan)	12	(3)
2012	ŁKS Łódź	11	(0)
2012–2014	Górnik Zabrze	25	(0)
2014–2018	Arka Gdynia	101	(7)
Total		315	(11)

International career
2004–2005	Poland U21	9	(0)
2008–2009	Poland	2	(0)
- * Club domestic league appearances and goals

Antoni Łukasiewicz (born 26 June 1983) is a Polish former professional footballer who played as a defender.

== Career ==
=== Club ===
In August 2007, he was loaned to U.D. Leiria.

In August 2011, he was loaned to ŁKS Łódź on a half-year deal, which was turned into a permanent deal on 23 February 2012.

=== International ===
A former captain of Poland's under-21 team, Łukasiewicz made his debut for the senior squad on 14 December 2008 against Serbia.

== Honours ==
Śląsk Wrocław

- Ekstraklasa Cup: 2008–09

Arka Gdynia

- I liga: 2015–16
- Polish Cup: 2016–17
