= Kamil Szymura =

Polish footballer (born 1990)

Personal information
- Full name: Kamil Szymura
- Date of birth: August 16, 1990 (age 36)
- Place of birth: Jastrzębie-Zdrój, Poland
- Height: 1.86 m (6 ft 1 in)
- Position: Centre-back

Team information
- Current team: Unia Turza Śląska
- Number: 27

Youth career
- 2005–2007: MOSiR Jastrzębie Zdrój

Senior career*
Years	Team	Apps	(Gls)
2007–2012	Górnik Zabrze (ME)	41	(1)
2008–2012	Górnik Zabrze	2	(0)
2010	→ Pelikan Łowicz (loan)	13	(1)
2010–2011	→ Ruch Radzionków (loan)	31	(1)
2012	→ GKS Katowice (loan)	9	(1)
2012–2013	Sandecja Nowy Sącz	9	(0)
2013–2020	GKS Jastrzębie	171+	(29+)
2020–2023	GKS Tychy	68	(2)
2023–2026	Pniówek Pawłowice	71	(4)
2026–	Unia Turza Śląska	3	(1)

International career
2011	Poland U21	1	(0)
- * Club domestic league appearances and goals as of 11:27, 22 March 2026 (UTC)

Kamil Szymura (born 16 August 1990) is a Polish professional footballer who plays for IV liga Silesia club Unia Turza Śląska as a centre-back.

== Career ==
In the summer 2010, he was loaned to Ruch Radzionków from Górnik Zabrze. He returned to Górnik one year later. In 2013, he signed a contract with GKS Jastrzębie.

During the 2018–19 season, he appeared in I liga 22 times and scored 7 goals.

On 1 August 2020, he signed a two-year contract with GKS Tychy.

== Honours ==
GKS Jastrzębie

- II liga: 2017–18
- III liga, group III: 2016–17
- IV liga Silesia II: 2013–14
- Polish Cup (Silesia regionals): 2015–16

Individual

- I liga Team of the Season: 2018–19
