= Budziński =

Budzinski or Budziński (feminine: Budzińska; plural: Budzińscy) is a Polish surname. It may refer to:

- Henryk Budziński (1904–1983), Polish rower
- Justyna Budzińska-Tylicka (1867–1936), Polish physician and feminist
- Lothar Budzinski-Kreth (1886–1955), German footballer
- Marcin Budziński (born 1990), Polish footballer
- Marcin Budziński (cyclist) (born 1998), Polish cyclist
- Mark Budzinski (born 1973), American baseball coach and player
- Nikki Budzinski (born 1977), American politician and labor leader
- Tomasz Budziński (born 1998), Polish cyclist

== See also ==
- Budzynski
