= Dominik Hofbauer =

Austrian footballer

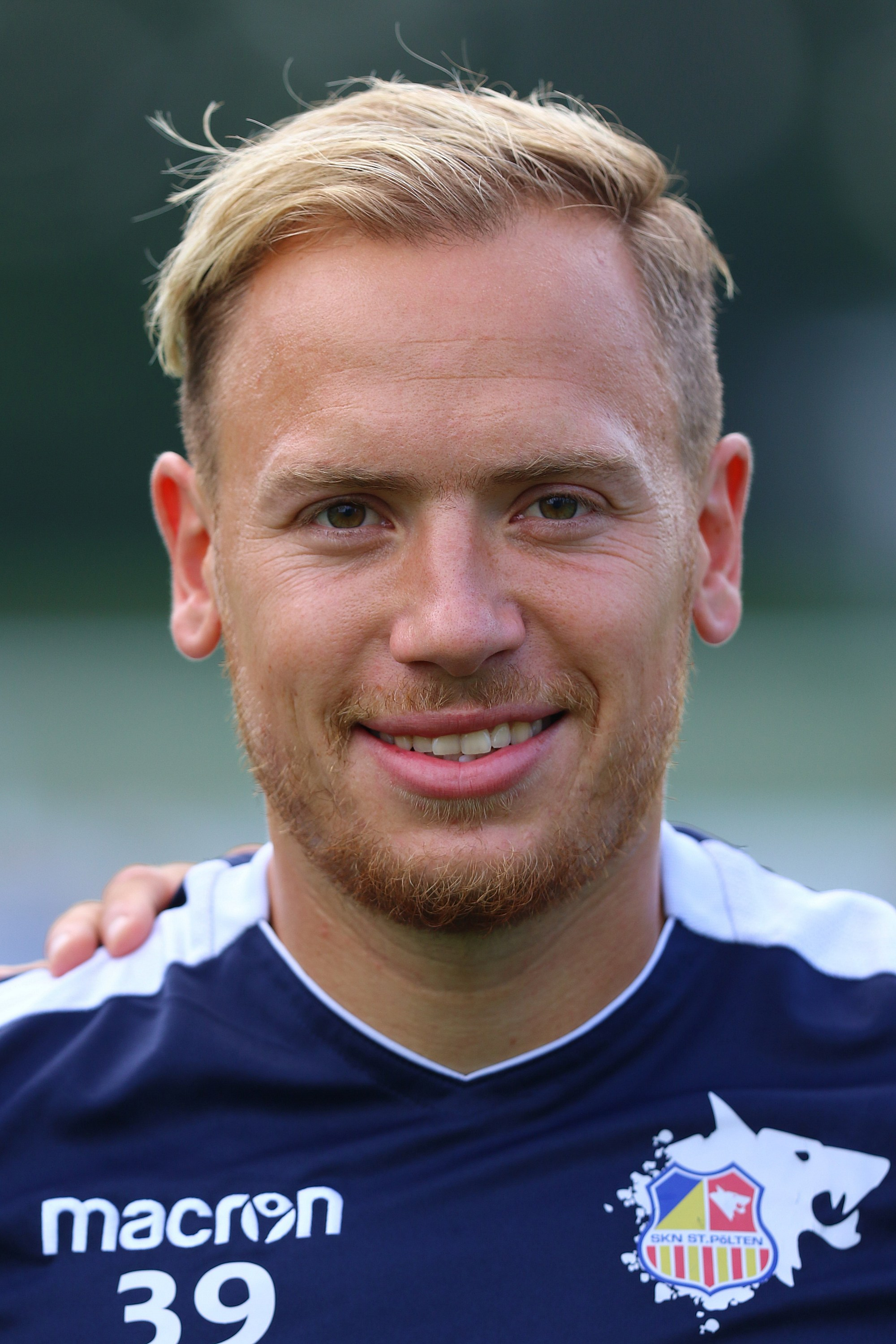

Personal information
- Date of birth: 10 September 1990 (age 36)
- Place of birth: Eggenburg, Austria
- Height: 1.82 m (6 ft 0 in)
- Position: Midfielder

Youth career
- 1996–2000: SK Eggenburg
- 2000–2005: Austria Wien
- 2005–2007: Sturm Graz
- 2007–2010: Aston Villa Academy

Senior career*
| Years | Team | Apps | (Gls) |
| 2007 | Sturm Graz II | 8 | (1) |
| 2010–2013 | Rapid Wien | 0 | (0) |
| 2010–2011 | → FAC Team für Wien (loan) | 9 | (1) |
| 2011–2012 | → SKN St. Pölten (loan) | 38 | (6) |
| 2012–2013 | → SC Wiener Neustadt (loan) | 23 | (0) |
| 2013–2015 | SKN St. Pölten | 34 | (0) |
| 2015 | SC Wiener Neustadt | 13 | (3) |
| 2015–2016 | SC Rheindorf Altach | 26 | (2) |
| 2016–2017 | Arka Gdynia | 25 | (2) |
| 2017–2020 | SKN St. Pölten | 55 | (2) |
- * Club domestic league appearances and goals

Dominik Hofbauer (born 10 September 1990) is an Austrian former professional footballer who played as a midfielder.

== Honours ==
Arka Gdynia

- Polish Cup: 2016–17
