= Kamil Zapolnik =

Polish footballer

Personal information
- Date of birth: 9 September 1992 (age 34)
- Place of birth: Białystok, Poland
- Height: 1.82 m (6 ft 0 in)
- Position: Forward

Team information
- Current team: Bruk-Bet Termalica
- Number: 25

Senior career*
Years	Team	Apps	(Gls)
2013–2014	Olimpia Zambrów	26	(13)
2014–2015	Wigry Suwałki	10	(3)
2015–2016	Olimpia Zambrów	17	(6)
2016–2017	Wigry Suwałki	43	(13)
2017–2018	GKS Tychy	39	(10)
2018–2020	Górnik Zabrze	41	(3)
2020–2023	Miedź Legnica	70	(15)
2023–2024	Puszcza Niepołomice	55	(9)
2024–	Bruk-Bet Termalica	58	(21)
- * Club domestic league appearances and goals as of 21:35, 25 May 2026 (UTC)

Kamil Zapolnik (born 9 September 1992) is a Polish professional footballer who plays as a forward for and captains I liga club Bruk-Bet Termalica Nieciecza.

== Club career ==
On 4 August 2020, he signed with Miedź Legnica. On 22 February 2023, Zapolnik moved to I liga side Puszcza Niepołomice on a two-and-a-half-year deal.

On 24 June 2024, he joined second division outfit Bruk-Bet Termalica Nieciecza.

== Honours ==
Olimpia Zambrów

- III liga Podlaskie–Warmia-Masuria: 2012–13

Miedź Legnica

- I liga: 2021–22

Individual

- Polish Cup top scorer: 2016–17
