= Ruch Wysokie Mazowieckie =

Polish football club

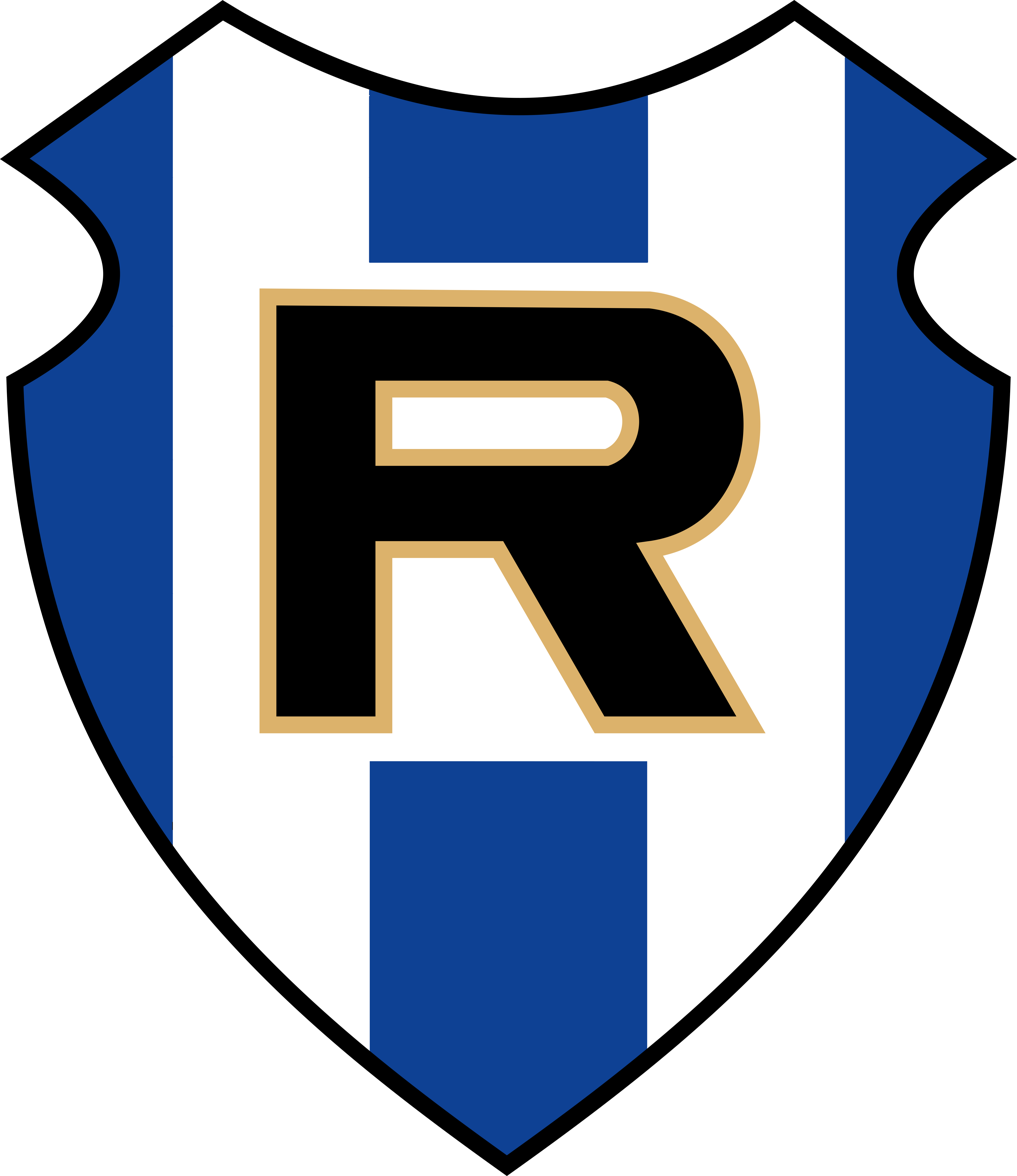
- Full name: Miejski Klub Sportowy Ruch Wysokie Mazowieckie
- Founded: 1955; 71 years ago
- Ground: Municipal Stadium
- Capacity: 999
- Chairman: Bogusław Bieliński
- Manager: Kamil Jackiewicz
- League: IV liga Podlasie
- 2023–24: IV liga Podlasie, 3rd of 18
- Website: www.ruchwysmaz.pl
Home colours	Away colours

Ruch Wysokie Mazowieckie is a Polish football club, currently playing in the IV liga Podlasie.
