= Patryk Stefański =

Polish footballer (born 1990)

Personal information
- Full name: Patryk Stefański
- Date of birth: 12 March 1990 (age 36)
- Place of birth: Mysłowice, Poland
- Height: 1.78 m (5 ft 10 in)
- Position: Midfielder

Team information
- Current team: Polonia Bytom
- Number: 16

Youth career
- GKS Katowice
- 1.FC Katowice
- 2009: Ruch Chorzów

Senior career*
Years	Team	Apps	(Gls)
2009–2014	Ruch Chorzów	6	(0)
2011–2012	→ Zagłębie Sosnowiec (loan)	19	(5)
2012	→ GKS Katowice (loan)	12	(0)
2013	→ Górnik Wesoła (loan)		
2013–2014	→ OKS Brzesko (loan)	28	(1)
2014–2017	Polonia Bytom	51	(6)
2017	ÍA	10	(0)
2018	Stal Stalowa Wola	11	(0)
2019–	Polonia Bytom	193	(42)
- * Club domestic league appearances and goals as of 08:45, 27 May 2026 (UTC)

Patryk Stefański (born 12 March 1990) is a Polish professional footballer who plays as a midfielder for I liga club Polonia Bytom.

== Career ==
Stefański made his Ekstraklasa debut on 21 November 2009. In February 2011, he was loaned to Zagłębie Sosnowiec on a half-year deal.

== Honours ==
Polonia Bytom

- II liga: 2024–25
- III liga: 2014–15 (Opole–Silesia), 2022–23 (group III)
- IV liga Silesia I: 2018–19
- Polish Cup (Silesia regionals): 2022–23
- Polish Cup (Bytom regionals): 2014–15, 2018–19, 2021–22, 2022–23
