= Mariusz Muszalik =

Polish footballer

Personal information
- Full name: Mariusz Muszalik
- Date of birth: 23 September 1979 (age 47)
- Place of birth: Katowice, Poland
- Height: 1.76 m (5 ft 9 1/2 in)
- Position: Midfielder

Senior career*
Years	Team	Apps	(Gls)
1993–1994	MK Górnik Katowice		
1994–2004	GKS Katowice	197	(12)
2004–2007	Odra Wodzisław	76	(1)
2007–2008	Dyskobolia Grodzisk	23	(2)
2008–2011	Piast Gliwice	70	(3)
2011–2012	Olimpia Elbląg	12	(0)
2012	Ruch Radzionków	13	(3)
2012–2018	ROW Rybnik	189	(35)
2018–2023	CKS Czeladź	117	(82)
- * Club domestic league appearances and goals

Mariusz Muszalik (born 23 September 1979) is a Polish former professional footballer who played as a midfielder.

== Career ==
=== Club ===
He was released from Piast Gliwice on 1 July 2011.

In July 2011, he joined Olimpia Elbląg on a one-year contract.

== Honours ==
Dyskobolia Grodzisk Wielkopolski

- Ekstraklasa Cup: 2007–08

ROW Rybnik

- II liga West: 2012–13

CKS Czeladź

- Klasa A Sosnowiec: 2020–21
