= Jakub Bąk =

Polish footballer (born 1993)

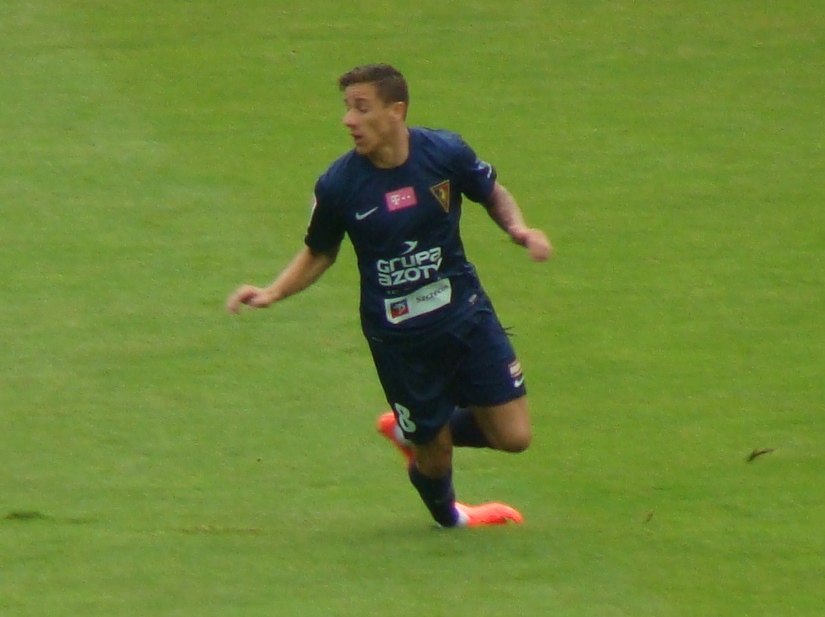
- Bąk with Pogoń Szczecin in 2014

Personal information
- Full name: Jakub Bąk
- Date of birth: 28 May 1993 (age 33)
- Place of birth: Rzeszów, Poland
- Height: 1.72 m (5 ft 7 1/2 in)
- Position: Midfielder

Team information
- Current team: Kalwarianka Kalwaria
- Number: 7

Youth career
- Orły Rzeszów
- –2009: Stal Rzeszów

Senior career*
Years	Team	Apps	(Gls)
2011–2013	Korona Kielce	7	(0)
2012–2013	→ GKS Tychy (loan)	27	(4)
2013–2015	Pogoń Szczecin	48	(4)
2015	→ GKS Tychy (loan)	15	(3)
2015–2016	Wisła Płock	20	(2)
2016–2017	Bytovia Bytów	30	(4)
2017–2018	Chojniczanka Chojnice	28	(4)
2018–2019	Podbeskidzie	9	(0)
2019–2020	Puszcza Niepołomice	26	(4)
2020	Garbarnia Kraków	17	(4)
2021–2024	Wieczysta Kraków	90	(27)
2024–2025	Wiślanie Skawina	31	(5)
2025–	Kalwarianka Kalwaria	34	(4)

International career
2010	Poland U17	4	(3)
2011	Poland U18	1	(0)
2013–2014	Poland U20	8	(2)
- * Club domestic league appearances and goals as of 09:53, 15 June 2026 (UTC)

Jakub Bąk (born 28 May 1993) is a Polish professional footballer who plays as a midfielder for IV liga Lesser Poland club Kalwarianka Kalwaria Zebrzydowska.

== Club career ==
Bąk started his career with Stal Rzeszów. He made his debut for Korona Kielce on 5 March 2011 in a 3–1 away defeat to Widzew Łódź.

On 21 August 2020, he joined Garbarnia Kraków.

== International career ==
Bąk was called up to the Poland U17, U18 and U20 teams.

== Honours ==
Wieczysta Kraków

- III liga, group IV: 2023–24
- IV liga Lesser Poland West: 2021–22
- Regional league Kraków II: 2020–21
- Polish Cup (Lesser Poland regionals): 2020–21, 2021–22 2022–23
