= Szymon Zgarda =

Polish footballer

Personal information
- Date of birth: 30 June 1994 (age 32)
- Place of birth: Poznań, Poland
- Height: 1.88 m (6 ft 2 in)
- Position: Midfielder

Youth career
- Przemysław Poznań
- 2004–2013: Lech Poznań

Senior career*
Years	Team	Apps	(Gls)
2013–2015	Lech Poznań II	21	(1)
2014–2015	Lech Poznań	0	(0)
2014	→ Miedź Legnica (loan)	9	(0)
2015	→ Widzew Łódź (loan)	8	(1)
2015–2017	GKS Bełchatów	46	(2)
2017	Podbeskidzie Bielsko-Biała	0	(0)
2018	Motor Lublin	11	(1)
2018–2022	Polonia Środa Wielkopolska	93	(4)
2022–2023	Szturm Junikowo Poznań	20	(5)
- * Club domestic league appearances and goals as of 20 November 2024

Szymon Zgarda (born 30 June 1994) is a Polish professional footballer who plays as a midfielder.

== Club career ==
Zgarda began his career at Lech Poznań, breaking into the second team at the age of 19. On 1 August 2016, he joined I liga club Miedź Legnica on a season-long loan. The next day, he made his professional debut, playing the full 90 minutes against Olimpia Grudziądz.

In February 2015, Zgarda joined Widzew Łódź on loan for the remainder of the 2015–16 season. He signed with GKS Bełchatów in July 2015, where he scored 2 goals in 46 league appearances, before moving to Podbeskidzie Bielsko-Biała. His two-year contract at Podbeskidzie was terminated by mutual consent on 27 November 2017.

On 25 January 2018, Zgarda signed a contract with Motor Lublin. In July 2018, he signed one-year deal with Polonia Środa Wielkopolska.

== Honours ==
Polonia Środa Wielkopolska

- Polish Cup (Greater Poland regionals): 2018–19, 2020–21, 2021–22
- Polish Cup (Poznań regionals): 2018–19

Szturm Junikowo

- Regional league Greater Poland II: 2022–23
- Polish Cup (Poznań regionals): 2022–23
