= Radosław Pruchnik =

Polish footballer

Personal information
- Full name: Radosław Pruchnik
- Date of birth: 11 October 1986 (age 40)
- Place of birth: Warsaw, Poland
- Height: 1.85 m (6 ft 1 in)
- Position: Midfielder

Team information
- Current team: Legia Warsaw Academy (individual development coordinator)

Youth career
- SEMP Ursynów
- Amica Wronki

Senior career*
Years	Team	Apps	(Gls)
2004–2006	Amica Wronki II		
2006–2007	Amica Wronki		
2007	Lech Poznań (ME)	13	(0)
2008–2009	Tur Turek	62	(1)
2010–2011	Flota Świnoujście	40	(5)
2011–2012	ŁKS Łódź	9	(0)
2012–2014	Arka Gdynia	74	(0)
2014–2018	Górnik Łęczna	72	(1)
2017	→ GKS Tychy (loan)	14	(1)
2018–2021	Legia Warsaw II	72	(5)
- * Club domestic league appearances and goals

Radosław Pruchnik (born 11 October 1986) is a Polish former professional footballer who played as a midfielder. He is currently the individual development coordinator at Legia Warsaw's academy.

== Career ==
In June 2011, he joined ŁKS Łódź on a two-year contract.

On 28 February 2017 he was loaned to GKS Tychy. On 18 July 2018, he was announced to be the Legia Warsaw II player.

== Honours ==
Legia Warsaw II

- Polish Cup (Masovia regionals): 2018–19
