= Daniel Barbus =

Polish footballer

Personal information
- Full name: Daniel Barbus
- Date of birth: 10 February 1996 (age 30)
- Place of birth: Katowice, Poland
- Height: 1.78 m (5 ft 10 in)
- Position: Midfielder

Youth career
- Promotor Południe Zabrze
- Górnik Zabrze

Senior career*
Years	Team	Apps	(Gls)
2012–2017	Górnik Zabrze	1	(0)
2013–2015	Górnik Zabrze II	29	(2)
2016	→ Puszcza Niepołomice (loan)	23	(0)
2017	→ Polonia Bytom (loan)	13	(0)
2017–2020	Podhale Nowy Targ	72	(3)
2020–2023	Gwarek Tarnowskie Góry	77	(9)
Total		215	(14)

International career
	Poland U16	3	(0)
2013	Poland U17	2	(0)
- * Club domestic league appearances and goals

Daniel Barbus (born 10 February 1996) is a Polish former professional footballer who played as a midfielder.
