= Dominik Budzyński =

Polish footballer (born 1992)

Personal information
- Date of birth: 2 June 1992 (age 34)
- Place of birth: Lubartów, Poland
- Height: 1.89 m (6 ft 2 in)
- Position: Goalkeeper

Team information
- Current team: Barycz Sułów
- Number: 55

Youth career
- Lewart Lubartów
- 2010–2012: Polonia Warsaw

Senior career*
Years	Team	Apps	(Gls)
2008–2010	Lewart Lubartów	0	(0)
2012–2013	Polonia Warsaw	0	(0)
2013	Viborg FF II		
2013–2014	Radomiak Radom	20	(0)
2015–2016	Miedź Legnica	3	(0)
2016–2018	Śląsk Wrocław	3	(0)
2016–2018	Śląsk Wrocław II	25	(0)
2018–2020	ŁKS Łódź	2	(0)
2020–2021	Sandecja Nowy Sącz	1	(0)
2022	Stomil Olsztyn	2	(0)
2022–2023	IFK Luleå	0	(0)
2023–	Barycz Sułów	109	(0)

International career
2012	Poland U20	1	(0)
- * Club domestic league appearances and goals as of 08:54, 26 June 2026 (UTC)

Dominik Budzyński (born 2 June 1992) is a Polish professional footballer who plays as a goalkeeper for and captains III liga club Barycz Sułów.

== Club career ==
On 14 August 2020, he signed a one-year contract with Sandecja Nowy Sącz.

== Honours ==
Barycz Sułów

- IV liga Lower Silesia: 2025–26
- Polish Cup (Lower Silesia regionals): 2023–24
- Polish Cup (Wrocław regionals): 2023–24, 2024–25
