= Jerzy Porębski =

Polish film producer and writer

Jerzy Porębski (born 28 February 1956 in Bielsko-Biała, Poland) is a Polish documentary film producer, scriptwriter, screenwriter, writer and co-writer, director and agent for mountaineering books. He is a Mountain culture consultant. His films mainly concern mountaineering and mountain rescue themes. He is interested in explorers, challenges, mountaineering, mountain culture and history. Salewa Man in 2010 and 2011.

== Works ==
2008 - "Polish Himalayas" – a publishing and production cycle of 6 books written by Janusz Kurczab and 5 documentary films on the history of Polish Himalayan mountaineering.

He was also originator and executive producer of the following:

1. "The First Conquerors", incl. documentary
2. "The Ice Warriors", incl. documentary
3. "The Great Climbing", incl. documentary
4. "Women in the Mountains", incl. documentary
5. "The Great Tragedies", incl. documentary
6. "Lexicon"

Published by Agora SA, Warsaw, Poland

2009 - "At every call" – documentary film, a hundred years’ history of TOPR (Tatrzańskie Ochotnicze Pogotowie Ratunkowe) Tatra Mountain Rescue Service. (Executive producer for TOPR.)

2010-2011 - "From the board of TOPR helicopter" – part 1 and part 2. Two documentary films concerning mounting rescue in Tatra mountains. (Producer, scriptwriter and director along with Bartosz Iłowski.)

2010 - "The Help Comes From the Skies" – documentary film dedicated to people creating helicopter rescue in Tatra mountains. (Producer, scriptwriter and director along with Bartosz Iłowski.)

2010-2012 - "TOPR Mountain Academy" ("Akademia Górska TOPR") – documentary and educational film cycle produced for Tatra Mountain Rescue Service TOPR: (Executive producer, scriptwriter and director along with Jan Krzysztof.)

1. "Thunderstorms"
2. "Skiing"
3. "Avalanches"

2011 – "Kukuczka" – documentary film dedicated to Jerzy Kukuczka. (producer, scriptwriter, director.)

2011 – "Art of Freedom" – documentary film about Polish Himalayan mountaineering. Producer: Adam Mickiewicz Institute. (Production cooperation.)

2012 – "The Ice Warriors" – graphic novel. Producer: Adam Mickiewicz Institute. Concept, script along with Jan Gogola.

2012 - "Water Warriors - Amazon" – graphic novel. Producer: Canoandes Inc, Herndon, VA, USA. Concept and script.

2012 - "The Lho La Tragedy. Beginning of the End" - graphic novel for Alpinist Magazine, USA. Concept and script with Bernadette McDonald

2012 - "Jan Karski" - graphic novel for Jan Karski Institut, Washington DC, USA. Concept and script. http://jankarskiinstituteus.org/graphicnovel_eng.htm

2013 - "TOPR Mountain Academy" part 4 - "Tourist belaying", educational film for Tatra Mountain Rescue Service TOPR. Executive producer, director along with Jan Krzysztof.

2013 - "Les Guerriers De L'Everest" – graphic novel. Producer: Filigranowa, France. Concept and script.

2014 - "Zakopanians" - documentary film, producer, scriptwriter, director.

2014 - "Hermann Buhl - The Great and the Beautiful is what counts." – graphic novel. Producer: Grivel, Italy. Concept and script.

2015 - "Manaslu" - documentary film, producer, scriptwriter, director.

2015 - "TOPR Mountain Academy" part 5 - "Winter mountaineering - hiking", educational film for Tatra Mountain Rescue Service TOPR. Executive producer, director and scriptwriter along with Robert Rokowski.

2016 - "Józef Uznański UJEK" - documentary film, producer, scriptwriter, director.

2016 - "With a kayak through life" - documentary film, producer, scriptwriter, director.

2016 - " On the trail with Byrcyn" - documentary film, producer, scriptwriter, director.

2017 - " Mountain Medics " - documentary film, executive producer, scriptwriter, director.

2018 - "Polskie Himalaje " ( Polish Himalayas ) book, updated edition, co-writer with Janusz Kurczab and Wojciech Fusek, publisher Agora SA.

2019 - "110 Anniversary of Tatra Rescue Team ( TOPR )" Newsweek Polska Extra, 136 pages, co-writer together with Wojciech Fusek.

2020 - " Lekarze w górach " ( Doctors in the Mountains ) book, co-writer with Wojciech Fusek, publisher Agora SA.

2020 - " Berbeka. Życie w cieniu Broad Peaku" (Berbeka. Life in the shadow of Broad Peak) book, co-writer with Dariusz Kortko. Publisher Agora SA.

2022 - " Lekari na horach " Czech edition of "Lekarze w gorach" ( Doctors in the Mountain ) publishing by Albatros media a.s., Praha, Czechia.

2022 - " GOPR. Na każde wezwanie" ( Mountain Rescue at every call ) book, co-writer with Wojciech Fusek. Publisher Agora SA

2023 - " Kurczab szpej, szpada i tajemnice" ( Kurczab climbing gear, sword and secrets) book, co-writer with Wojciech Fusek. Publisher Agora SA

== Awards ==
2009 – "Polish Himalayas" ("Polskie Himalaje") – International Mountain Film Festival, Bansko, Bulgaria, Award of the Association of Tourist Enterprises Bansko.

2009 – "Polish Himalayas" ("Polskie Himalaje") – International Mountain Film Festival, Teplice na Metuji, Czech Rep., Special award.

2010 – "Women in mountains" in "Polish Himalayas" ("Panie w górach" in "Polskie Himalaje") – "Inkafest" Mountain & Environment Film Festival, Huaraz, Peru, Best film award in the category of mountaineering.

2010 – "Women in mountains" in "Polish Himalayas" ("Panie w górach" in "Polskie Himalaje") – International Mountain Film Festival, Domžale, Slovenia, Special Jury Award.

2010 – "Women in mountains" in "Polish Himalayas" ("Panie w górach" in "Polskie Himalaje") – International Outdoor Film Festival, Prague, Czech Rep., Special Award.

2010 – "Women in mountains" in "Polish Himalayas" ("Panie w górach" in "Polskie Himalaje") – International Mountain Film Festival, Trento, Italy, Student Jury Award.

2011 – "Kukuczka" – Mountain Film Review im. Andrzeja Zawady, Lądek Zdrój, Poland. Special award for: ”Promotion of the greatest achievements of Polish Himalayan mountaineering, for commemorating the achievements of Polish mountaineering legends, the formula for and method of carrying out a narrative that allows to listen to many very interesting reflections provided by the greatest climbers of the world”.

2012 - "Kukuczka" - 24 Berg & Abenteuer Filmfestival Graz, Austria. Special Mention.

2012 - "Kukuczka" - 1 Chicago International Mountain Film Festival, Chicago, USA. Special Jury Award

2012 - "Kukuczka" - 1 Chicago International Mountain Film Festival, Chicago, USA. Audience Award.

2013 - "Kukuczka" - XVI Moscow International Festival of Mountaineering and Adventure Films Vertical, Special prize for the "Best Director" for "Kukuczka" - Director Jerzy Porebski

2013 - "Kukuczka" - Czech - Polish Outdoor Film Festival, Cieszyn, Poland. Best mountaineering film.

2014 - "Zakopanians" - VIII Festival Internacional de Cine de Montana Ushuaia, Argentina. Premio Mejor Largometraje.

2014 - "Zakopanians" - 10th Mountain Film Meetings, Zakopane, Poland. Special Jury Award.

2018 - "Polskie Himalaje" among eight of the most interesting books of 2018 by forbes.pl

2020 - "Lekarze w górach" ( Doctors in the Mountains ), Festiwal Literatury Górskiej Ladek Zdroj, nomination to Mountain Book of the Year 2020 in category Reportage.

2021 - "Berbeka. Życie w cieniu Broad Peaku: ( Berbeka. Life in the shadow of Broad Peak ) nomination Sports Book of the Year 2020, by sportowa książka roku.

2021 - "Berbeka. Życie w cieniu Broad Peaku". ( Berbeka. Life in the shadow of Broad Peak ) nomination Biography of the Year 2020 by lubimyczytac.pl and allegro.pl

2021 - "Berbeka. Życie w cieniu Broad Peaku". ( Berbeka. Life in the shadow of Broad Peak ) nomination Zakopane Literary Award 2021

2021 - "Berbeka. Życie w cieniu Broad Peaku". ( Berbeka. Life in the shadow of Broad Peak ) Zakopane Literary Award 2021.

== Experiences ==
Film Jury Experiences - chaired or participated in Mountain Film Festival juries in Poland, Slovakia, Czech Republic, Spain, Peru, Bulgaria, North Macedonia.

== Graphic novels exhibitions ==
Bilbao, San Sebastian, La Seu D'Urgell - Spain, Ushuaia - Argentina, Ulju - South Korea
