= Maciej Filipowicz =

Polish footballer

Personal information
- Date of birth: 17 August 1998 (age 28)
- Place of birth: Radom, Poland
- Height: 1.74 m (5 ft 9 in)
- Position: Midfielder

Youth career
- –2012: Legion Radom
- 2012–2015: Białe Orły Warszawa

Senior career*
Years	Team	Apps	(Gls)
2015–2020	Radomiak Radom	75	(4)
2015–2016	→ Pilica Białobrzegi (loan)	27	(5)
2020–2021	Orlęta Radzyń Podlaski	30	(5)
2022	Radomiak Radom II	5	(1)
Total		137	(15)
- * Club domestic league appearances and goals

Maciej Filipowicz (born 17 August 1998) is a Polish former professional footballer who played as a midfielder.

== Club career ==
On 22 October 2020, he joined Orlęta Radzyń Podlaski in the fourth-tier III liga.

== Honours ==
Radomiak Radom

- II liga: 2018–19
