= Gabriel Nowak =

Polish footballer

Personal information
- Full name: Gabriel Nowak
- Date of birth: 26 July 1986 (age 40)
- Place of birth: Rybnik, Poland
- Height: 1.86 m (6 ft 1 in)
- Position: Midfielder

Youth career
- 2002–2003: Energetyk Rybnik

Senior career*
Years	Team	Apps	(Gls)
2003–2009	Energetyk ROW Rybnik		
2008–2009	→ GKS Katowice (loan)	21	(0)
2009–2010	GKS Katowice	46	(4)
2011–2014	Górnik Zabrze	11	(0)
2013	→ Rozwój Katowice (loan)	10	(2)
2015–2017	ROW Rybnik	58	(7)
2017–2018	Odra Opole	26	(6)
2018–2019	Kotwica Kołobrzeg	8	(0)
- * Club domestic league appearances and goals

Gabriel Nowak (born 26 July 1986) is a Polish former professional footballer who played as a midfielder.

== Career ==
=== Club ===
In summer 2008, he was loaned to GKS Katowice on a one-year deal. In July 2009, he signed a two-year contract with GKS Katowice.

In January 2011, he joined Górnik Zabrze on a three-and-a-half-year contract.
