= Charles Uwakwe =

Nigerian professor

Charles Uchenna Uwakwe

Registrar of National Examination Council, NECO
- In office 2016–2020

Personal details
- Party: Non-Partisan

Charles Ukakwe is a Nigerian professor of Counselling/Health Psychology, educational administrator and former Registrar of the National Examination Council (Nigeria). He was appointed in 2016 by Muhammadu Buhari and had his appointment terminated on May 21, 2020.
