= Damian Kowalczyk =

Polish footballer

Personal information
- Full name: Damian Kowalczyk
- Date of birth: 3 August 1995 (age 31)
- Place of birth: Lubin, Poland
- Height: 1.80 m (5 ft 11 in)
- Position: Forward

Team information
- Current team: Jaworzanka 1946 Jawor

Youth career
- 2002–2008: Javoria Jawor
- 2008–2011: Zagłębie Lubin

Senior career*
Years	Team	Apps	(Gls)
2011–2013	Zagłębie Lubin (ME)	26	(8)
2013–2015	Zagłębie Lubin II	45	(20)
2012–2015	Zagłębie Lubin	9	(0)
2015–2016	Pogoń Szczecin II	25	(5)
2016–2021	Chrobry Głogów	107	(13)
2017	→ Rozwój Katowice (loan)	14	(4)
2021–2022	Ruch Chorzów	11	(1)
2022–2023	Jaworzanka 1946 Jawor	19	(5)
2023–2024	Granit Roztoka	24	(8)
2024–	Jaworzanka 1946 Jawor	0	(0)

International career
2012–2013	Poland U18	3	(2)
2013	Poland U19	3	(1)
- * Club domestic league appearances and goals as of 13:00, 3 August 2024 (UTC)

Damian Kowalczyk (born 3 August 1995) is a Polish footballer who plays as a forward for Jaworzanka 1946 Jawor.

== Career ==
He made his debut for Zagłębie Lubin in a 4–1 victory to Wisła Kraków on 8 December 2012.

== Honours ==
Zagłębie Lubin

- I liga: 2014–15
