= Tomasz Midzierski =

Polish footballer

Personal information
- Full name: Tomasz Midzierski
- Date of birth: 5 June 1985 (age 41)
- Place of birth: Jastrzębie-Zdrój, Poland
- Height: 1.96 m (6 ft 5 in)
- Position: Centre-back

Team information
- Current team: Mila Turka
- Number: 2

Youth career
- –2004: MOSiR Jastrzebie Zdroj

Senior career*
Years	Team	Apps	(Gls)
2004–2006	GKS Jastrzębie		
2006	KSZO Ostrowiec	14	(0)
2006	→ Lech Poznań (loan)	0	(0)
2007	Górnik Łęczna	1	(0)
2007–2008	Lech Poznań	1	(0)
2008	→ Lechia Gdańsk (loan)	7	(0)
2008–2009	Lechia Gdańsk	8	(0)
2009–2010	Zawisza Bydgoszcz	25	(3)
2010–2012	Sandecja Nowy Sącz	28	(1)
2012–2013	GKS Bogdanka	32	(2)
2013–2017	Miedź Legnica	125	(9)
2017–2018	GKS Katowice	25	(2)
2018–2022	Górnik Łęczna	102	(6)
2022–2024	Avia Świdnik	36	(2)
2024–	Mila Turka	15	(5)
- * Club domestic league appearances and goals as of 10:43, 21 June 2025 (UTC)

Tomasz Midzierski (born 5 June 1985) is a Polish professional footballer who plays as a centre-back for Klasa A club Mila Turka.

== Career ==
=== Early years ===
Midzierski started his career with his local team MOSiR Jastrzebie Zdroj, playing for the team's youth sides. In 2004 he moved to the largest football team in the city, joining GKS Jastrzębie. He stayed with GKS for two seasons before he left for KSZO Ostrowiec, where his professional career began. After making five league appearances in six months, and a short loan spell with Lech Poznań, Midzierski sealed a move that saw him joining Górnik Łęczna in the Ekstraklasa, Poland's top division.

=== Playing in the Ekstraklasa ===
While with Górnik Łęczna Midzierski mostly found himself as a backup with most of his appearances coming in the Ekstraklasa Cup. Górnik advanced all the way to the semi-finals, losing out to eventual winners Dyskobolia Grodzisk Wielkopolski, with Midzierski playing in both legs of the semi-finals. It was with Górnik that Midzierski made his first Ekstraklasa appearance, making his top division debut against Dyskobolia Grodzisk Wielkopolski. His league appearance against Dyskobolia proved to be his only league appearance with Górnik Łęczna, moving during the summer transfer window and joining Lech Poznań after only 6 months.

The situation while at Lech was similar to that while he was with Górnik. Most of Midzierski's appearances came in cup competitions or in the Młoda Ekstraklasa with the Lech U21's team. His only league appearance with Lech came on 22 September 2007 in Lech's 6–2 win over Ruch Chorzów. Due to his lack of first team playing time he joined Lechia Gdańsk on loan for the rest of the season after only six months with Lech.

Due to Lechia playing in the division below, Midzierski found that he had more playing time in the league. His Lechia debut came on 15 March 2008 against Wisła Płock, helping to secure a Lechia win. He went on to make seven league appearances for Lechia during his loan spell, helping Lechia to six wins in those seven games, and being a part of the Lechia side that won the II liga (now known as the I liga) and thus promotion to the Ekstraklasa. Over the summer Midzierski's move to Lechia was made permanent, and Midzierski had his greatest season in the Ekstraklasa thus far. He would go on to make eight appearances for Lechia in the league that season, helping the newly promoted club to stay in the league. He would move on to join another club at the end of the season, having made 10 appearances in the Ekstraklasa with three different clubs over three seasons.

=== Short term moves ===
One of the difficulties that Midzierski had during the start of his career was the lack of stability with a club. This would continue after his move away from Lechia, initially joining Zawisza Bydgoszcz. The move saw him dropping from Poland's first division, to Poland's third division. It was a move that proved to be successful though, with Midzierski making 25 league appearances that season, more league appearances than the rest of his career combined thus far. Before the start of the new season, Midzierski had already committed to leaving Zawisza, this time to join I liga club Sandecja Nowy Sącz. His move to Sandecja saw him playing for his longest period yet, but it was still for only two seasons. In his first season Midzierski struggled to make an impact on the first team, only making five league appearances. He had a better second season however as he went on to make 23 league appearances, a combined total of 28 league appearances for the club. For the start of the 2012–13 season Midzierski rejoined Górnik Łęczna (then playing under the name GKS Bogdanka), a club he had first played for five years prior. Midzierski had his most successful season yet, playing in nearly every game for the club that season, making 32 league appearances and scoring two goals, making 34 appearances in all competitions for that season.

=== Miedź Legnica ===
In 2013 Midzierski joined Miedź Legnica, a move that gave him stability with a club for a number of seasons. Upon joining the I liga club Midzierski instantly became an important defender. Over the next four seasons he played most league games each season, and had made his 100th appearance for the club by the start of his fourth season with the club. For the first three seasons of playing with Miedź the club were neither in danger of relegation or had a chance of being promoted. In his final season however the club were in a strong position, finishing the season in fourth place, only one point from second place and automatic promotion. After four seasons with the club Midzierski made 125 appearances and scored nine goals in the league, and 134 appearances and 11 goals in all competitions.

In 2017 Midzierski joined GKS Katowice, a move that saw him staying with the club for just over a season. He went on to make a further 22 appearances and scoring two goals in his first league season, and three more league appearances at the start of his second season, before he made the transfer to Górnik Łęczna for his third spell with the club.

=== Górnik Łęczna ===
He joined Górnik with the club having found themselves in the third division. In his first season back with the club Górnik finished mid-table with a disappointing season. The season after however the club returned to the I liga by winning the II liga, with Midzierski having 30 appearances and two goals to his name as Górnik won the title. The following season saw some fortune for Górnik, as the play-off system was introduced into the second tier. The club finished in 6th place, but due to the play-offs it meant the club still had a chance of gaining promotion. Górnik Łęczna beat GKS Tychy over two legs in the semi-finals, and beat ŁKS Łódź in the final, meaning the club had won back-to-back promotions and were returning to the Ekstraklasa. On 24 July 2021 Midzierski featured as Górnik drew 1–1 with Cracovia, Midzierski's first Ekstraklasa appearance in 12 years. On 14 June 2022, it was announced he would not renew his contract and would leave the team at the end of the season.

=== Avia Świdnik ===
On 27 June 2022, he joined the fourth division side Avia Świdnik.

== Honours ==
Lechia Gdańsk

- II liga: 2007–08

Górnik Łęczna

- II liga: 2019–20

Avia Świdnik

- Polish Cup (Lublin County regionals): 2023–24

Mila Turka

- Klasa B Lublin III: 2024–25
