= Tomasz Porębski =

Polish rally driver

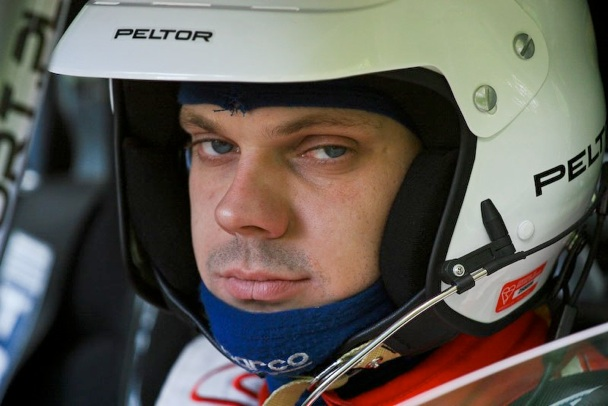
Tomasz Porębski
Date of birth	28 August 1980
Place of birth	Bielsko-Biała, Poland
Current car	Citroën C2R2 Max
Pilot	Tomasz Spurek
Greatest successes	2009 Polish Champion in Class A-6; 2009 Polish Champion in the class R2B; 2009 Polish Champion of Citroën Racing Trophy
Official site	Tomasz Porębski

Tomasz Porębski (born 28 August 1980 in Bielsko-Biała, Poland) is a Polish rally driver. He competes in Polish Rally Championships in Citroën C2R2 Max and is a current Champion in classes A6 and R2B. He also won the Citroën Racing Trophy Poland in 2009. He is related to motor sports on every day basis, leading a company in his home town dedicated to building and preparing racing cars.

During his career he has driven several different cars, such as the Fiat 126p, Fiat Cinquecento, Peugeot 106, Peugeot 206, Ford Fiesta ST and Renault Clio R3.

== Achievements ==
- Polish Rally Champion in Class A-6 2009
- Polish Rally Champion in the class R2B 2009
- Polish Champion of Citroën Racing Trophy Poland 2009
- Victory in the A-7 Class – Magurski Rally 2008
- Victory in the A-7 Class – Rally of Poland 2006
- Runner up in the A-6 Class 2005
- Runner up in the N1 Class 2003
