= Paweł Wojciechowski (footballer, born 1990) =

Polish footballer (born 1990)

Personal information
- Date of birth: 24 April 1990 (age 36)
- Place of birth: Wrocław, Poland
- Height: 1.80 m (5 ft 11 in)
- Position: Forward

Team information
- Current team: Odra Malczyce
- Number: 99

Youth career
- –2001: Odra Malczyce
- 2001–2003: Śląsk Wrocław
- 2003–2004: Miedź Legnica
- 2004–2005: Śląsk Wrocław
- 2005–2006: UKP Zielona Góra
- 2006–2008: Promień Opalenica
- 2007: → Murcia Deportivo (loan)
- 2008: → Heerenveen (loan)

Senior career*
Years	Team	Apps	(Gls)
2008–2010	Heerenveen	9	(2)
2010–2012	Willem II	19	(2)
2012–2013	Minsk	12	(5)
2014	Zawisza Bydgoszcz	6	(0)
2014	Shakhtyor Soligorsk	11	(2)
2015–2017	Chrobry Głogów	48	(10)
2017	Odra Opole	3	(0)
2018	Ruch Chorzów	9	(0)
2018–2022	Górnik Łęczna	93	(36)
2022–2023	Resovia	29	(2)
2023–2024	Ślęza Wrocław	12	(8)
2024	Barycz Sułów	14	(11)
2024–2025	Ślęza Wrocław	20	(7)
2025–	Odra Malczyce	0	(0)

International career
	Poland U16	4	(5)
2008	Poland U19	1	(0)
- * Club domestic league appearances and goals as of 12:15, 28 June 2026 (UTC)

Paweł Wojciechowski (Polish pronunciation: [ˈpavɛw vɔjt͡ɕɛˈxɔfskʲi]; born 24 April 1990) is a Polish professional footballer who plays as a forward for Odra Malczyce. From 2008 to 2010, he played for Dutch club SC Heerenveen and for Willem II from 2010 until June 2012. He also played for the Poland U19 youth team.

== Club career ==
In February 2008, Promień Opalenica loaned him out to Heerenveen with a buy option. In late May, the Dutch club decided to sign him permanently. Wojciechowski made his first appearance in the Eredivisie against AZ Alkmaar on 1 November 2008, marking his debut with a goal. In May 2010, he was offered a two-year extension, on the condition that he spend the following season on loan at FC Emmen in the Dutch second division. Wojciechowski turned down the proposal.

In July 2010, he joined Eredivisie side Willem II on a free transfer, signing a two-year contract. He sustained a serious knee injury in a pre-season match.

== Honours ==
FC Minsk

- Belarusian Cup: 2012–13

Zawisza Bydgoszcz

- Polish Cup: 2013–14

Górnik Łęczna

- II liga: 2019–20

Barycz Sułów

- Polish Cup (Lower Silesia regionals): 2023–24
- Polish Cup (Wrocław regionals): 2023–24
