= Stadion Miejski (Jastrzębie-Zdrój) =

Football stadium in Jastrzębie-Zdrój, Poland

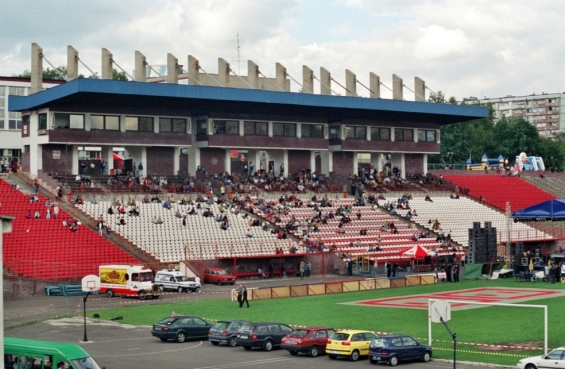
- Interactive map of Stadion Miejski
- Full name: Stadion Miejski w Jastrzębiu-Zdroju
- Location: Jastrzębie-Zdrój, Poland
- Coordinates: 49°57′0″N 18°36′43″E
- Capacity: 15,000 (6,800 seated)
- Surface: Grass
- Field size: 103 m x 66 m

Construction
- Renovated: 2007

Tenant
- GKS Jastrzębie

Stadion Miejski w Jastrzębiu Zdroju is a football stadium in Jastrzębie-Zdrój, Poland. The stadium is used by the GKS Jastrzębie. The stadium has 6,800 seats; the areas of the stadium without seats are not used.
