= Michał Budzyński =

Polish footballer (born 1988)

Personal information
- Date of birth: 3 June 1988 (age 38)
- Place of birth: Lublin, Poland
- Height: 1.80 m (5 ft 11 in)
- Position: Defender

Team information
- Current team: Błękitni Obsza
- Number: 9

Youth career
- Legion Tomaszowice

Senior career*
Years	Team	Apps	(Gls)
2005–2006	Orion Niedrzwica Duża		
2007	Koziołek Lublin		
2007–2008	Orlęta Radzyń Podlaski	17	(0)
2008–2009	Motor Lublin II		
2009	Motor Lublin	11	(0)
2010–2017	Wisła Puławy	177	(13)
2017–2018	Motor Lublin	2	(0)
2018–2021	Lewart Lubartów	51	(12)
2021–2022	Chełmianka Chełm	55	(3)
2023	Granica Lubycza Królewska	13	(0)
2023–	Błękitni Obsza	35	(4)
- * Club domestic league appearances and goals as of 10:17, 24 June 2025 (UTC)

Michał Budzyński (born 3 June 1988) is a Polish professional footballer who plays as a defender for regional league club Błękitni Obsza. He formerly played for Orlęta Radzyń Podlaski, Wisła Puławy, Motor Lublin, and Lewart Lubartów.

== Career ==
Budzyński began his career at Legion Tomaszowice. After one-and-a-half seasons with Orion Niedrzwica Duża, he joined Koziołek Lublin, where he played until the end of the 2006–07 season. In the summer of 2007, Budzyński joined III liga side Orlęta Radzyń Podlaski. He made his debut for Orlęta in a 4–1 home defeat to Wisłoka Dębica. In the 2007–08 season Budzyński played 17 league matches.

In fall 2008, Budzyński moved to I liga club Motor Lublin. After one season of reserve football at Motor, he made his professional debut on 8 August 2009 as a substitute in a 4–1 home loss to Warta Poznań.

On 24 February 2010, Budzyński joined III liga side Wisła Puławy. In his second season, he made 24 league appearances for Wisła, scoring 3 goals, and helping them win promotion to II liga. On 11 July 2017, the club and player mutually agreed to terminate his contract. In his seven years in the Wisła first team, Budzyński made a total of 184 appearances in all competitions, scoring 13 goals.

On 12 July 2017, Budzyński signed for III liga club Motor Lublin. His contract at Motor was terminated by mutual consent on 30 April 2018. In August 2018, he signed a deal with Lewart Lubartów.

== Honours ==
Wisła Puławy

- III liga Lublin–Subcarpathia: 2010–11

Lewart Lubartów

- IV liga Lublin: 2019–20

Chełmianka Chełm

- Polish Cup (Lublin regionals): 2021–22
- Polish Cup (Chełm regionals): 2021–22
