= IV liga Podlasie =

- Organising body: Podlasie Football Association
- Founded: 2000; 26 years ago
- Country: Poland
- Number of clubs: 18
- Level on pyramid: 5
- Promotion to: III liga, group I
- Relegation to: Liga okręgowa
- Current champions: Olimpia Zambrów (2nd title) (2025–26)
- Most championships: Four clubs (3 titles each)
- Sponsor(s): Bank Spółdzielczy Bielsk Podlaski

IV liga Podlasie group (grupa podlaska), also known as Bank Spółdzielczy Bielsk Podlaski IV liga podlaska due to sponsorship reasons, is one of the groups of IV liga, the fifth level of Polish football league system.

The league was created in the 2000–01 season, after introducing the new administrative division of Poland. Until the end of the 2007–08 season, IV liga was the fourth tier of league system, but this was changed with the formation of the Ekstraklasa as the top-level league in Poland.

The clubs from Podlaskie Voivodeship compete in this group. The winner of the league is promoted to group I of the III liga. The bottom teams are relegated to the Podlasie group of the regional league.
