= Longinus Uwakwe =

Nigerian footballer (born 1987)

Personal information
- Full name: Longinus Ifeanyi Uwakwe
- Date of birth: 12 February 1987 (age 39)
- Place of birth: Nigeria
- Height: 1.84 m (6 ft 0 in)
- Position: Midfielder

Senior career*
Years	Team	Apps	(Gls)
2006	KKS Koluszki		
2007–2010	Stal Stalowa Wola	61	(1)
2010	Sandecja Nowy Sącz	2	(0)
2011	Kolejarz Stróże	3	(0)
2011–2012	MKS Piaseczno	28	(3)
2012–2013	Garbarnia Kraków	28	(1)
2013–2021	Puszcza Niepołomice	191	(4)
2021–2022	Watra Białka Tatrzańska		
2022–2023	Puszcza Niepołomice II		
- * Club domestic league appearances and goals

Longinus Ifeanyi Uwakwe (born 2 February 1987) is a Nigerian professional footballer who plays as a midfielder.

== Career ==
In 2006, Uwakwe signed for Polish lower league side KKS Koluszki.

In 2007, he signed for Sandecja Nowy Sącz in the Polish third division.

In 2010, he signed for Polish second division club Sandecja Nowy Sącz.

In 2011, Uwakwe signed for MKS Piaseczno in the Polish fourth division.

In 2013, he signed for Polish second division team Puszcza Niepołomice from Garbarnia Kraków in the Polish third division.

From 2013 to 2021 he played for Puszcza Niepołomice.

== Private life ==
He has Polish citizenship.
