= Łukasz Jamróz =

Polish footballer (born 1990)

Personal information
- Full name: Łukasz Jamróz
- Date of birth: 18 February 1990 (age 36)
- Place of birth: Kielce, Poland
- Height: 1.90 m (6 ft 3 in)
- Position: Striker

Team information
- Current team: Korona Kielce (youth fitness coach)

Senior career*
| Years | Team | Apps | (Gls) |
| 2011–2014 | Korona Kielce | 14 | (2) |
| 2013 | → Arka Gdynia (loan) | 13 | (0) |
| 2014 | → Stal Rzeszów (loan) | 10 | (2) |
| 2014–2015 | Stomil Olsztyn | 16 | (1) |
| 2015–2018 | KSZO Ostrowiec Świętokrzyski | 84 | (29) |
| 2018–2019 | Neptun Końskie | 29 | (16) |
| 2019–2020 | Zio-Max Nowiny | 16 | (6) |
| 2023–2025 | Korona Kielce II | 12 | (0) |
| Total | | 194 | (56) |
- * Club domestic league appearances and goals

Łukasz Jamróz (born 18 February 1990) is a Polish former professional footballer who played as a striker. He currently serves as a fitness coach for Korona Kielce's youth teams.

== Honours ==
KSZO Ostrowiec Świętokrzyski

- Polish Cup (Świętokrzyskie regionals): 2015–16, 2016–17

Korona Kielce II

- IV liga Świętokrzyskie: 2023–24
