= Olimpia Zambrów =

Polish football club

- Full name: Zambrowski Klub Sportowy Olimpia Zambrów
- Founded: 1953; 73 years ago (as Włókniarz)
- Ground: Municipal Stadium
- Capacity: 999
- Chairman: Kamil Czarnecki
- Manager: Michał Kolanowski
- League: III liga, group I
- 2025–26: IV liga Podlasie, 1st of 18 (promoted)
- Website: olimpiazambrow.pl
Home colours	Away colours

Olimpia Zambrów is a Polish football club located in Zambrów, Poland. They currently play in group I of the III liga, the fourth tier, after winning the 2025–26 IV liga Podlasie.
