= IV liga Silesia =

- Organising body: Silesian Football Association
- Founded: 2000; 26 years ago
- Country: Poland
- Number of clubs: 18
- Level on pyramid: 5
- Promotion to: III liga, group III
- Relegation to: V liga
- Current champions: ROW 1964 Rybnik (2025–26)
- Sponsor(s): InterHall
- Website: 1 Liga Śląska on Facebook

IV liga Silesia group (Polish: grupa śląska), also known as I liga Śląska InterHall for sponsorship reasons, is one of the groups of IV liga, the fifth level of Polish football league system.

The league was created in the 2000–01 season after introducing new administrative division of Poland. Until the end of the 2007–08 season, IV liga was the fourth tier of league system, but this was changed with the formation of the Ekstraklasa as the top-level league in Poland.

From its inception, IV liga Silesia was divided into subgroups, before switching to a single group format in 2024.

The clubs from Silesian Voivodeship compete in this group. The winner of the league is promoted to group III of the III liga. The bottom teams are relegated to the silesian V liga. The number of teams relegated to the V liga are normally two and one to the relegation play-offs, but when more teams get relegated from higher tiers, more teams can get relegated. Still, one team goes to relegation play-offs.
