= GKS Jastrzębie =

Polish football club

- Full name: Klub Sportowy GKS Jastrzębie Spółka Akcyjna
- Founded: 1961; 65 years ago
- Ground: Municipal Stadium
- Capacity: 5,500
- Chairman: Andrzej Kwiatek (acting)
- Manager: Jakub Złotek
- League: Klasa B Rybnik II
- 2025–26: II liga, 18th of 18 (withdrew from the competition)
Home colours	Away colours

Klub Sportowy GKS Jastrzębie (English: Sports Club GKS Jastrzębie), commonly known as GKS Jastrzębie (Polish pronunciation: [jasˈtʂɛmbʲɛ]), is a football club based in Jastrzębie-Zdrój, Poland.

== Name ==
On 25 November 2021, the club announced the change of the club's name to "Klub Sportowy GKS Jastrzębie Spółka Akcyjna", removing the element of 1962 from the name.

== History ==
In the 1988–89 season, they played in the Polish top-flight.

In the 2025–26 season, they competed in II liga before withdrawing their senior and reserve teams from competition in March 2026. Following a restructure, GKS entered the Klasa B, the lowest tier of Polish football, for the 2026–27 season.
