= 2014–15 Legia Warsaw season =

Legia Warsaw
2014–15 season
- Manager: Henning Berg
- Ekstraklasa: 2nd
- Polish Cup: Winners
- UEFA Champions League: Third qualifying round
- UEFA Europa League: Round of 32
- Top goalscorer: League: Orlando Sá (13 goals); All: Orlando Sá (14 goals)
- Highest home attendance: 26,527 (vs Wisła Kraków, 15 March 2015)
- Lowest home attendance: 8,000 (vs Podbeskidzie Bielsko-Biała, 8 April 2015)
Home colours	Away colours

Legia Warszawa is a professional football club based in Warsaw, Poland.

== Players ==
=== Current squad ===
The numbers are established according to the official website: legia.com

Last updated on 16 August 2014

Squad no.	Name	Nationality	Position	Date of birth (age)
Goalkeepers
1	Lukasz Budzilek	(Poland)	GK	19 March 1991 (aged 23)
12	Dušan Kuciak	(Slovakia)	GK	21 May 1985 (aged 29)
91	Konrad Jałocha	(Poland)	GK	9 May 1991 (aged 23)
95	Aleksander Wandzel	(Poland)	GK	12 January 1995 (aged 19)
Defenders
2	Dossa Júnior	(Cyprus)	CB	28 July 1986 (aged 28)
4	Igor Lewczuk	(Poland)	RB	30 May 1985 (aged 29)
5	Mateusz Wieteska	(Poland)	CB	11 February 1997 (aged 17)
15	Iñaki Astiz	(Spain)	CB	5 November 1983 (aged 30)
17	Tomasz Brzyski	(Poland)	LB	10 January 1982 (aged 32)
19	Bartosz Bereszyński	(Poland)	RB	12 July 1992 (aged 22)
25	Jakub Rzeźniczak (VC)	(Poland)	CB	26 October 1986 (aged 27)
28	Łukasz Broź	(Poland)	RB	17 December 1985 (aged 28)
30	Ronan	(Brazil)	LB	25 August 1994 (aged 19)
Midfielders
3	Tomasz Jodłowiec	(Poland)	DM/CM	8 August 1985 (aged 29)
6	Guilherme	(Brazil)	LW	12 May 1991 (aged 23)
8	Ondrej Duda	(Slovakia)	AM	15 December 1994 (aged 19)
14	Mateusz Szwoch	(Poland)	AM/LW/RW	19 March 1993 (aged 21)
18	Michał Kucharczyk	(Poland)	LW/RW	20 March 1991 (aged 23)
20	Jakub Kosecki	(Poland)	LW/RW	29 August 1990 (aged 23)
21	Ivica Vrdoljak (C)	(Croatia)	DM/CM	19 September 1983 (aged 30)
22	Michał Kopczyński	(Poland)	DM/CM	15 June 1992 (aged 22)
23	Hélio Pinto	(Portugal)	CM/AM	29 February 1984 (aged 30)
27	Robert Bartczak	(Poland)	RW	12 March 1996 (aged 18)
31	Krystian Bielik	(Poland)	DM	4 August 1998 (aged 16)
32	Miroslav Radović (VC)	(Serbia)	AM/ST	16 January 1984 (aged 30)
33	Michał Żyro	(Poland)	LW/RW	20 September 1992 (aged 21)
76	Bartłomiej Kalinkowski	(Poland)	DM/CM	11 July 1994 (aged 20)
Forwards
9	Marek Saganowski	(Poland)	ST	31 October 1978 (aged 35)
11	Arkadiusz Piech	(Poland)	ST	7 June 1985 (aged 29)
45	Adam Ryczkowski	(Poland)	ST/RW	30 April 1997 (aged 17)
70	Orlando Sá	(Portugal)	ST	26 May 1988 (aged 26)

=== Reserve team ===
- Legia Warszawa Reserve Team

== Transfers ==
=== Transfers in ===
Entry date	Position	No.	Player	From club	Fee	Ref
22 May 2014	GK	1	(Poland) Lukasz Budzilek	(Poland) GKS Katowice	free	
10 June 2014	AM	14	(Poland) Mateusz Szwoch	(Poland) Arka Gdynia	€75,000	
18 June 2014	ST	11	(Poland) Arkadiusz Piech	(Poland) Zagłębie Lubin	€250,000	
19 June 2014	RB	4	(Poland) Igor Lewczuk	(Poland) Zawisza Bydgoszcz	€200,000	
4 July 2014	DM	31	(Poland) Krystian Bielik	(Poland) Lech Poznań	€100,000	

=== Loans in ===
Start date	Position	No.	Player	From club	Ref
17 June 2014	LB	19	(Brazil) Ronan	(Brazil) Fluminense	

=== Transfers out ===
Exit date	Position	No.	Player	To club	Fee	Ref
17 June 2014	DM	35	(Poland) Daniel Łukasik	(Poland) Lechia Gdańsk	€800,000	
17 June 2014	GK	84	(Poland) Wojciech Skaba	(Poland) Ruch Chorzów	free	
4 July 2014	ST	11	(Poland) Michał Efir	(Poland) Ruch Chorzów	€25,000	
12 August 2014	ST	13	(Georgia (country)) Vladimir Dvalishvili	(Denmark) Odense	free	

=== Loans out ===
Start date	Position	No.	Player	To club	Ref
1 July 2014	CB	39	(Poland) Mateusz Cichocki	(Poland) Dolcan Ząbki	
3 July 2014	LW	-	(Poland) Aleksander Jagiełło	(Poland) Arka Gdynia	
21 July 2014	ST	27	(Poland) Patryk Mikita	(Poland) Dolcan Ząbki	
14 August 2014	RW	7	(Estonia) Henrik Ojamaa	(Scotland) Motherwell	

== Competitions ==
=== Friendlies ===
25 June 2014 Friendly	Legia Warsaw	2 – 0	FK Atlantas	Gniewino, Poland
16:00 CEST (UTC+2)	Kucharczyk 31'; Sá 51'	Report		Attendance: 150

1 July 2014 Friendly	Legia Warsaw	4 – 1	Pogoń Szczecin	Gniewino, Poland
17:00 CEST (UTC+2)	Sá 9' (pen.); Pinto 13' (pen.); Kucharczyk 36'; Broź (yellow card) 45'; Piech 76'	Report	Frączczak (yellow card) 22'; Zwoliński 86'

2 July 2014 Friendly	Legia Warsaw	0 – 0	Arka Gdynia	Gniewino, Poland
14:00 CEST (UTC+2)		Report

8 July 2014 Friendly	Legia Warsaw	1 – 0	Hapoel Be'er Sheva	Warsaw, Poland
20:45 CEST (UTC+2)	Żyro 56'	Report		Stadium: Pepsi Arena; Attendance: 150

=== Polish Super Cup ===
9 July 2014 Super Cup	Legia Warsaw	2 – 3	Zawisza Bydgoszcz	Warsaw, Poland
10:00 CEST (UTC+2)	Vrdoljak (yellow card) 29'; Ryczkowski 43'; Piech (yellow card) 61'; Saganowski 71'	Report	Petasz (yellow card) 6'; Luís Carlos 30'; Álvarinho 54'; Drygas (yellow card) 64'; Vasconcelos (yellow card) 83'; Gevorgyan 90'	Stadium: Pepsi Arena; Attendance: 11,826; Referee: Bartosz Frankowski (Toruń)

=== Ekstraklasa ===
19 July 2014 1	Legia Warsaw	0 - 1	GKS Belchatow	Warsaw, Poland
20:30 CEST (UTC+2)	Pinto (yellow card) 27'; Rzeźniczak (yellow card) 83'	Report	Ślusarski (yellow card) 41'; Ślusarski 45'; Rachwał (yellow card) 47'; Basta (yellow card) 83'; Poźniak (yellow card) 90+1'	Stadium: Pepsi Arena; Attendance: 8,700; Referee: Daniel Stefański (Bydgoszcz)

26 July 2014 2	Cracovia	1 - 3	Legia Warsaw	Kraków, Poland
20:30 CEST (UTC+2)	Nowak 4'; Dudzic (yellow card) 53'; Rymaniak (yellow card) 86'	Report	Kosecki 23'; Jodłowiec 47'; Vrdoljak 74' (.pen)	Stadium: Józef Piłsudski Stadium; Attendance: 8,308; Referee: Mariusz Złotek (Stalowa Wola)

2 August 2014 3	Legia Warsaw	1 - 1	Górnik Zabrze	Warsaw, Poland
20:30 CEST (UTC+2)	Kosecki (yellow card) 55'; Saganowski 66'; Bereszyński (yellow card) 85'	Report	Lewczuk 25' (o.g.); Gancarczyk (yellow card) 53'; Sadzawicki (yellow card) 67'; Danch (yellow card) 87'	Stadium: Pepsi Arena; Attendance: 12,351; Referee: Bartosz Frankowski (Toruń)

9 August 2014 4	Legia Warsaw	5 - 0	Górnik Łęczna	Warsaw, Poland
20:30 CEST (UTC+2)	Vrdoljak 16', 64' (pen.); Kosecki 49'; Sá 70', 80'	Report	Božić (red card) 64'	Stadium: Pepsi Arena; Attendance: 10,344; Referee: Jarosław Przybył (Kluczbork)

15 August 2014 5	Jagiellonia Białystok	0 - 3	Legia Warsaw	Białystok, Poland
20:30 CEST (UTC+2)	Gajos (yellow card) 30'; Baran (yellow card) 45'; Wasiluk (yellow card) 54' (yellow-red card) 79'; Frankowski (yellow card) 62'	Report	Żyro 14'; Radović 25'; Rzeźniczak (yellow card) 32'; Kosecki (yellow card) 70'; Kucharczyk 84'; Vrdoljak (yellow card) 86'; Iñaki Astiz (yellow card) 90+2'	Stadium: Białystok City Stadium; Attendance: 7,435; Referee: Bartosz Frankowski (Toruń)

24 August 2014 6	Legia Warsaw	2 - 0	Korona Kielce	Warsaw, Poland
15:30 CEST (UTC+2)	Sá 63'; Saganowski 76'	Report	Leandro (yellow card) 79'; Outtara (yellow card) 90+2'	Stadium: Pepsi Arena; Attendance: 12,729; Referee: Daniel Stefański (Bydgoszcz)

23 August 2014 7	Podbeskidzie	2 - 1	Legia Warsaw	Bielsko-Biała, Poland
15:30 CEST (UTC+2)	Sloboda 8'; Korzym 38'; Konieczny (yellow card) 62'; Sokołowski (yellow card) 75'; Górkiewicz (yellow card) 78'	Report	Sá 25'; Vrdoljak (yellow card) 33'; Szwoch (yellow card) 35'; Brzyski (yellow card) 45'; Rzeźniczak (yellow card) 90+5'	Stadium: Stadion Miejski (Bielsko-Biała); Attendance: 3,500; Referee: Jarosław Przybył (Kluczbork)

13 September 2014 8	Legia Warsaw	4 - 3	Śląsk Wrocław	Warsaw, Poland
20:30 CEST (UTC+2)	Radović 13'; Dossa Júnior 21'; Dossa Júnior 42'; Kucharczyk (yellow card) 63'; Żyro (yellow card) 73'; Radović 85'	Report	Mila 34'; Machaj 49'; Hołota (yellow card) 56'; Droppa (yellow card) 79'; Flávio Paixão 90'	Stadium: Pepsi Arena; Attendance: 16,187; Referee: Paweł Gil (Lublin)

21 September 2014 9	Wisła Kraków	0 - 3	Legia Warsaw	Kraków, Poland
18:00 CEST (UTC+2)	Burliga (yellow card) 55'; Garguła (yellow card) 56'	Report	Kucharczyk (yellow card) 19'; Broź (yellow card) 29'; Sá 50'; Jodłowiec (yellow card) 64'; Saganowski (yellow card) 83'; Duda 90+5'; Radović 90+7'	Stadium: Stadion Miejski im. Henryka Reymana; Attendance: 31,289; Referee: Szymon Marciniak (Płock)

27 September 2014 10	Legia Warsaw	2 - 2	Lech Poznań	Warsaw, Poland
20:30 CEST (UTC+2)	Brzyski 76'; Broź (yellow card) 82'; Dossa Júnior 90'; Dossa Júnior (yellow card) 90+1'	Report	Kędziora (yellow card) 11'; Wilusz (yellow card) 30'; Kamiński 33'; Formella 40'; Douglas (yellow card) 64'; Gostkowski (yellow card) 89'	Stadium: Pepsi Arena; Attendance: 25,934; Referee: Bartosz Frankowski (Toruń)

5 October 2014 11	Piast Gliwice	3 - 1	Legia Warsaw	Gliwice, Poland
15:30 CEST (UTC+2)	Wilczek 16', 36', 76'	Report	Bielik (yellow card) 20'; Rzeźniczak (yellow card) 80'; Duda 90'	Stadium: Stadion Piast; Attendance: 7,714; Referee: Bartosz Frankowski (Toruń)

17 October 2014 12	Legia Warsaw	1 - 0	Lechia Gdańsk	Warsaw, Poland
20:30 CEST (UTC+2)	Sá 87'	Report		Stadium: Pepsi Arena; Attendance: 18,171; Referee: Paweł Gil (Lublin)

=== Polish Cup ===
24 September 2014 Round of 32	Miedź Legnica	0–4	Legia Warsaw	Legnica
17:45 CEST (UTC+2)	Cierpka (yellow card) 29'; Garuch (yellow card) 43' (yellow-red card) 53'; Lafrance (yellow card) 71'; Zgarda (yellow card) 78'	Report	Vrdoljak 23'; Radović 49', 90'; Brzyski (yellow card) 53' (yellow-red card) 74'; Kosecki 53'; Iñaki Astiz (yellow card) 61'	Stadium: Stadion im. Orła Białego w Legnicy; Attendance: 5,100; Referee: Zbigniew Dobrynin (Łódź)

30 October 2014 Round of 16	Legia Warsaw	3–1 (a.e.t.)	Pogoń Szczecin	Warsaw
20:45 CEST (UTC+2)	Żyro 22'; Broź 93' (pen.); Jodłowiec 107'	Report	Zwoliński 11'	Stadium: Polish Army Stadium; Attendance: 15,412; Referee: Szymon Marciniak (Płock)

12 February 2015 Quarter-finals First Leg	Śląsk Wrocław	1–1	Legia Warsaw	Wrocław
20:00 CEST (UTC+2)	Paixão 85'	Report	Żyro 45'	Stadium: Stadion Miejski; Attendance: 15,183; Referee: Adam Lyczmański (Bydgoszcz)

5 March 2015 Quarter-finals Second Leg	Legia Warsaw	1–1 (a.e.t.) (3–1 p)	Śląsk Wrocław	Warsaw
20:00 CEST (UTC+2)	Żyro 53'	Report	Grajciar 12'	Stadium: Polish Army Stadium; Attendance: 21,464; Referee: Szymon Marciniak (Płock)

1 April 2015 Semi-finals First Leg	Podbeskidzie Bielsko-Biała	1–4	Legia Warsaw	Bielsko-Biała
20:00 CEST (UTC+2)	Korzym 84'	Report	Masłowski 24'; Vrdoljak 30'; Kucharczyk 71'; Kosecki 87'	Stadium: Stadion Miejski; Attendance: 5,877; Referee: Mariusz Złotek (Stalowa Wola)

8 April 2015 Semi-finals Second Leg	Legia Warsaw	2–0	Podbeskidzie Bielsko-Biała	Warsaw
20:45 CEST (UTC+2)	Saganowski 19', 46'	Report		Stadium: Polish Army Stadium; Attendance: 10,870; Referee: Zbigniew Dobrynin (Łódź)

2 May 2015 Final	Lech Poznań	1–2	Legia Warsaw	Warsaw
16:00 CEST (UTC+2)	Jodłowiec 20' (own)	Report	Jodłowiec 30'; Saganowski 55'	Stadium: National Stadium; Attendance: 45,322; Referee: Daniel Stefański (Bydgoszcz)

=== Champions League ===
16 July 2014 Second Qualifying	Legia Warsaw	1–1	(Republic of Ireland) St Patrick's Athletic	Warsaw, Poland
	Radović 90+1'	Report	Fagan 38'	Stadium: Pepsi Arena, Warsaw; Attendance: 10,000; Referee: Marius Avram (Romania)

23 July 2014 Second Qualifying	St Patrick's Athletic (Republic of Ireland)	0–5 (1-6 agg.)	Legia Warsaw	Dublin, ireland
		Report	Radović 25', 82'; Żyro 69'; Saganowski 87'; Byrne 90+2' (o.g.)	Stadium: Tallaght Stadium, Dublin; Attendance: 5,500; Referee: Andreas Ekberg (Sweden)

*Celtic to play at Murrayfield Stadium due to Commonwealth Games Opening Ceremony at Celtic Park
**Celtic was awarded a 3-0 walkover due to Legia fielding an ineligible player

30 July 2014 Third Qualifying	Legia Warsaw	4–1	(Scotland) Celtic	Warsaw, Poland
21:45 GMT	Radović 10', 36'; Iñaki Astiz (yellow card) 22'; Żyro 84'; Kosecki (yellow card) 89'; Kosecki 90+1'	Report	McGregor 8'; Ambrose (red card) 44'; Mulgrew (yellow card) 86'; Kayal (yellow card) 88'; Griffiths (yellow card) 89'	Stadium: Pepsi Arena; Attendance: 22,265; Referee: Pol van Boekel (Royal Dutch Football Association)

5 August 2014 Third Qualifying	Celtic (Scotland)	3 - 0 (w.o)** (4 - 4 agg.)	Legia Warsaw	Edinburgh, Scotland
19:45 GMT	van Dijk (yellow card) 53'; Johansen (yellow card) 65'	Report	Żyro 36'; Radović (yellow card) 55'; Kucharczyk 61'	Stadium: Murrayfield Stadium * Attendance: 35,000; Referee: Paolo Silvio Mazzoleni (Italian Football Federation)

=== Europa League ===
21 August 2014 Play-off Round	(Kazakhstan) Aktobe	0 – 1	Legia Warsaw	Aktobe, Kazakhstan
	Korobkin (yellow card) 72'	Report	Duda 48'	Stadium: Central Stadium, Aktobe; Attendance: 12,500; Referee: Sergei Karasev (Russia)

28 August 2014 Play-off Round	Legia Warsaw	2 - 0 (3 - 0 agg.)	(Kazakhstan) Aktobe	Warsaw, Poland
	Kucharczyk 26'; Vrdoljak (yellow card) 29'; Vrdoljak 66' (pen.); Kosecki (yellow card) 69'; Kuciak (yellow card) 85'	Report	Korobkin (yellow card) 23'; Logvinenko (yellow card) 65'	Stadium: Pepsi Arena; Attendance: 18,549; Referee: Mattias Gestranius (Finland)

==== Group stage ====
Pos	Team	Pld	W	D	L	GF	GA	GD	Pts	Qualification	LEG	TRA	LOK	MET
1	(Poland) Legia Warsaw	6	5	0	1	7	2	+5	15	Advance to knockout phase	—	2–0	1–0	2–1
2	(Turkey) Trabzonspor	6	3	1	2	8	6	+2	10	Advance to knockout phase	0–1	—	2–0	3–1
3	(Belgium) Lokeren	6	3	1	2	4	4	0	10		1–0	1–1	—	1–0
4	(Ukraine) Metalist Kharkiv	6	0	0	6	3	10	−7	0		0–1	1–2	0–1	—

Source: Soccerway
Rules for classification: Group stage tiebreakers

18 September 2014 Group L	Legia Warsaw	1 – 0	(Belgium) Lokeren	Warsaw, Poland
	Radović 58'; Broź (yellow card) 64'; Rzeźniczak (yellow card) 77'; Żyro (yellow card) 85'	Report	Scholz (yellow card) 56'; Vanaken (yellow card) 78'	Stadium: Pepsi Arena; Attendance: 22,000; Referee: Michael Oliver (England)

2 October 2014 Group L	(Turkey) Trabzonspor	0 – 1	Legia Warsaw	Trabzon, Turkey
	Constant (yellow card) 45'; Papadopoulos (yellow card) 74'; Yilmaz (yellow card) 90+5'	Report	Kucharczyk 16'; Żyro (yellow card) 25' (yellow-red card) 88'; Brzyski (yellow card) 35'; Kucharczyk (yellow card) 43'; Dossa Júnior (yellow card) 49'; Duda (yellow card) 80'	Stadium: Hüseyin Avni Aker Stadium; Attendance: 9,875; Referee: Viktor Kassai (Hungary)

22 October 2014 Group L	(Ukraine) Metalist Kharkiv	0 - 1	Legia Warsaw	Valeriy Lobanovskyi Dynamo Stadium, Kyiv
	Torres (yellow card) 36'; Bolbat (yellow card) 36'; Pshenychnykh (yellow card) 59'; Edmar (yellow card) 86'	Report	Duda 28' (yellow card) 84'	Attendance: 2,374; Referee: Gediminas Mažeika (Lithuania)

27 November 2014 Group L	Legia Warsaw	2 - 1 (3 - 1 agg.)	Metalist Kharkiv	Pepsi Arena, Warsaw
	Saganowski 29'; Kucharczyk (yellow card) 45+1'; Duda 84'; Sá (yellow card) 86'; Rzeźniczak (yellow card) 90+1'	BBC Report	(Ukraine) Villagra (yellow card) 14'; Kobin 22'; Torres (yellow card) 62'; Kulakov (yellow card) 63'; Edmar (yellow card) 86'	Attendance: 26,000; Referee: (Israel) Eitan Shemeulevitch

6 November 2014 Group L	(Belgium) Lokeren	1 - 0 (1 - 1 agg.)	Legia Warsaw	Daknamstadion, Lokren
	Vanaken 7'; Patosi (yellow card) 84'	BBC Report	Guilerhme (yellow card) 36'; Rzezniczak (yellow card) 52'; Jodłowiec (yellow card) 82'	Referee: (Greece) Michael Koukolakis

== Statistics ==
=== Appearances ===
Numbers in parentheses denote appearances as substitute.
Players with no appearances not included in the list.

As of match played 2 October 2014

No.	Pos.	Nat.	Name	Ekstraklasa	Polish Cup	Champions League	Europa League	Super Cup	Total
No.	Pos.	Nat.	Name	Apps	Apps	Apps	Apps	Apps	Apps
2	DF	(Cyprus)	Dossa Júnior	8	0	0	4	0	15
3	MF	(Poland)	Tomasz Jodłowiec	7 (1)	1	4	4	0	17
4	DF	(Poland)	Igor Lewczuk	4	0 (1)	0	0	1	6
5	DF	(Poland)	Mateusz Wieteska	2	0	0	0	1	3
8	MF	(Slovakia)	Ondrej Duda	2 (4)	1	3 (1)	4	0	15
9	FW	(Poland)	Marek Saganowski	6 (4)	0 (1)	0 (4)	0 (2)	1	18
11	FW	(Poland)	Arkadiusz Piech	3	0	0 (1)	0	1	5
12	GK	(Slovakia)	Dušan Kuciak	8	1	4	4	0	17
13	FW	(Georgia (country))	Vladimir Dvalishvili	1	0	0	0	0	1
14	MF	(Poland)	Mateusz Szwoch	1 (2)	0	0	0	0	3
15	DF	(Spain)	Iñaki Astiz	1	1	4	0	0	6
17	DF	(Poland)	Tomasz Brzyski	7	1	4	4	0	16
18	MF	(Poland)	Michał Kucharczyk	2 (2)	1	3	4	0	12
19	DF	(Poland)	Bartosz Bereszyński	6	0	0 (1)	0	1	8
20	MF	(Poland)	Jakub Kosecki	8	1	1 (3)	0 (2)	1	16
21	MF	(Croatia)	Ivica Vrdoljak	7 (2)	1	3 (1)	4	1	19
23	MF	(Portugal)	Helio Pinto	6 (1)	0 (1)	1 (1)	0	0	10
25	DF	(Poland)	Jakub Rzeźniczak	7 (1)	1	4	4	0	17
28	DF	(Poland)	Łukasz Broź	4 (1)	1	4	4	0	14
31	MF	(Poland)	Krystian Bielik	1	0	0	0	0	1
32	MF	(Serbia)	Miroslav Radović	5 (2)	1	4	4	0	16
33	MF	(Poland)	Michał Żyro	3 (1)	0	4	4	0	12
45	FW	(Poland)	Adam Ryczkowski	3 (1)	0	0	0	1	5
70	FW	(Portugal)	Orlando Sá	3 (2)	0	1	0	0	6
76	MF	(Poland)	Bartłomiej Kalinkowski	1 (1)	0	0	0	1	3
96	GK	(Poland)	Konrad Jałocha	2 (1)	0	0	0	1	4

=== Goalscorers ===
Includes all competitive matches. The list is sorted by shirt number when total goals are equal.

As of match played 2 October 2014

Ranking	Position	Squad Number	Player	Ekstraklasa	Polish Cup	Champions League	Europa League	Polish Super Cup	Total
1	FW	70	(Portugal) Orlando Sá	5	0	0	0	0	5
2	MF	32	(Serbia) Miroslav Radović	4	2	5	1	0	12
3	MF	21	(Croatia) Ivica Vrdoljak	3	1	0	1	0	5
3	DF	2	(Cyprus) Dossa Júnior	3	0	0	0	0	3
5	FW	9	(Poland) Marek Saganowski	2	0	1	0	1	4
5	MF	20	(Poland) Jakub Kosecki	2	1	1	0	0	4
7	MF	3	(Poland) Tomasz Jodłowiec	1	0	0	0	0	1
7	MF	9	(Slovakia) Ondrej Duda	1	0	0	1	0	2
7	DF	17	(Poland) Tomasz Brzyski	1	0	0	0	0	1
7	MF	18	(Poland) Michał Kucharczyk	1	0	1	2	0	4
7	MF	33	(Poland) Michał Żyro	1	0	3	0	0	4
11	FW	45	(Poland) Adam Ryczkowski	0	0	0	0	1	1

=== Assists ===
Includes all competitive matches. The list is sorted by shirt number when total assists are equal.

As of match played 2 October 2014

Ranking	Position	Squad Number	Player	Ekstraklasa	Polish Cup	Champions League	Europa League	Polish Super Cup	Total
1	DF	20	(Poland) Tomasz Brzyski	7	0	1	1	0	9
2	MF	32	(Serbia) Miroslav Radović	2	0	1	0	0	3
2	MF	23	(Portugal) Hélio Pinto	2	0	0	0	0	2
4	MF	3	(Poland) Tomasz Jodłowiec	1	1	0	0	0	2
4	MF	8	(Slovakia) Ondrej Duda	1	0	2	0	0	3
4	FW	9	(Poland) Marek Saganowski	1	0	0	0	0	2
4	FW	11	(Poland) Arkadiusz Piech	1	0	0	0	0	1
4	MF	18	(Poland) Michał Kucharczyk	1	1	2	1	0	5
4	MF	20	(Poland) Jakub Kosecki	1	1	1	0	0	3
4	MF	21	(Croatia) Ivica Vrdoljak	1	0	1	1	1	4
4	DF	28	(Poland) Łukasz Broź	1	0	1	0	0	2
4	MF	33	(Poland) Michał Żyro	1	0	3	1	0	5
13	MF	79	(Poland) Bartłomiej Kalinkowski	0	0	0	0	1	1
