= 2014 Polish Super Cup =

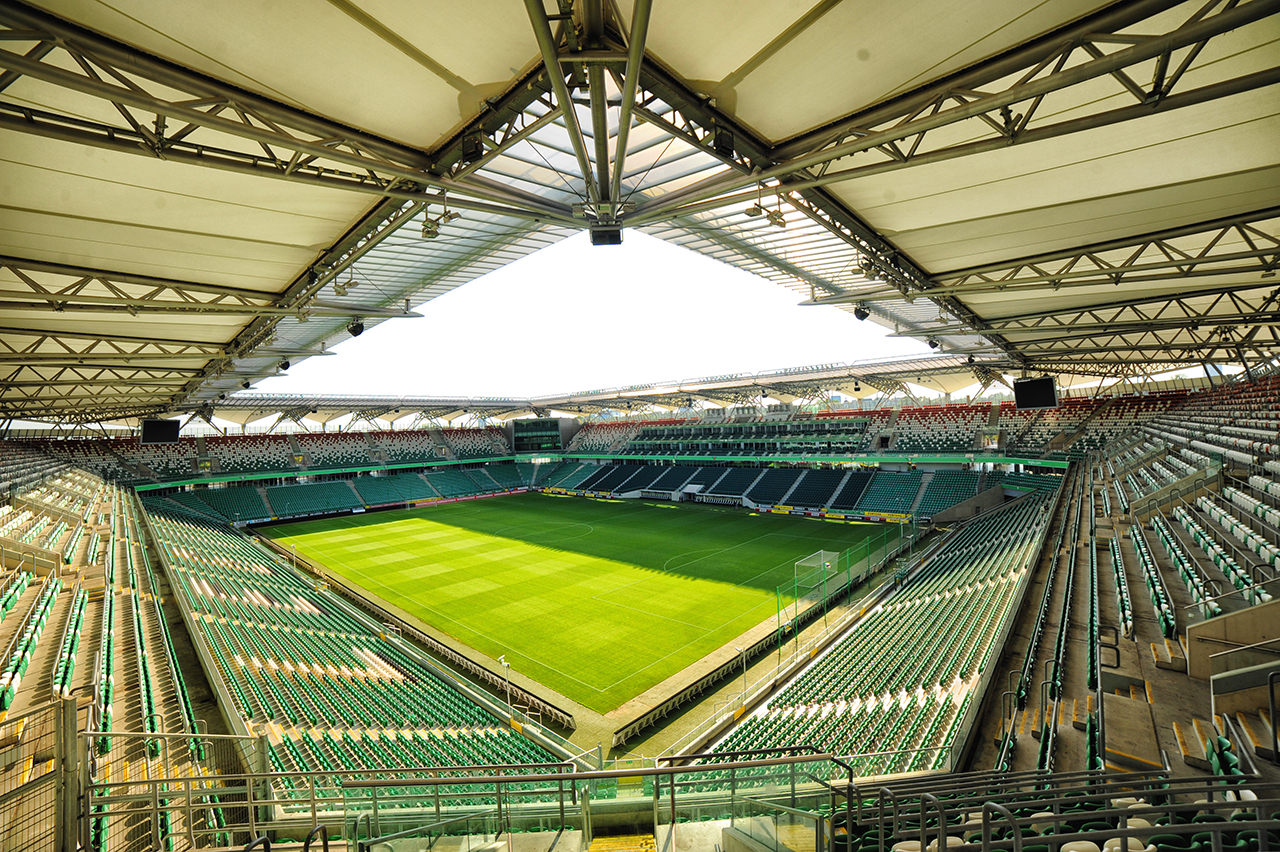
- The Polish Army Stadium in Warsaw hosted the final.
Legia Warsaw	Zawisza Bydgoszcz
2	3
- Date: 9 July 2014
- Venue: Polish Army Stadium, Warsaw
- Referee: Bartosz Frankowski (Toruń)
- Attendance: 11,826

The 2014 Polish Super Cup was held on 9 July 2014 between the 2013–14 Ekstraklasa winners Legia Warsaw and the 2013–14 Polish Cup winners Zawisza Bydgoszcz. Zawisza Bydgoszcz won the match 3–2, winning the trophy for the first time in their history.

== Match details ==
9 July 2014
19:00 CEST (UTC+02:00)

Legia Warsaw	2–3	Zawisza Bydgoszcz
Ryczkowski 44'; Saganowski 71'	Report	Luís Carlos 30'; Alvarinho 54'; Gevorgyan 90'

Polish Army Stadium, Warsaw
Attendance: 11,826
Referee: Bartosz Frankowski (Toruń)

Legia Warsaw:
GK	91	(Poland) Konrad Jałocha
DF	27	(Poland) Robert Bartczak
DF	4	(Poland) Igor Lewczuk
DF	5	(Poland) Mateusz Wieteska
DF	19	(Poland) Bartosz Bereszyński		(substituted off) 90'
MF	20	(Poland) Jakub Kosecki
MF	21	(Croatia) Ivica Vrdoljak	Yellow card
MF	76	(Poland) Bartłomiej Kalinkowski		(substituted off) 73'
MF	9	(Poland) Marek Saganowski
MF	45	(Poland) Adam Ryczkowski		(substituted off) 74'
FW	11	(Poland) Arkadiusz Piech	Yellow card
Substitutes:
GK	1	(Poland) Łukasz Budziłek
DF	39	(Poland) Mateusz Hołownia		(substituted on) 90'
MF	66	(Poland) Kamil Kurowski		(substituted on) 73'
MF	73	(Poland) Łukasz Moneta		(substituted on) 74'
MF	82	(Poland) Grzegorz Tomasiewicz
Manager:
(Norway) Henning Berg

Zawisza Bydgoszcz:
GK	12	(Poland) Grzegorz Sandomierski
DF	11	(Poland) Sebastian Ziajka
DF	4	(Portugal) André Micael
DF	3	(Portugal) Joshua Silva
DF	2	(Poland) Piotr Petasz	Yellow card
MF	22	(Brazil) Luís Carlos		(substituted off) 78'
MF	15	(Poland) Paweł Strąk		(substituted off) 46'
MF	14	(Poland) Kamil Drygas	Yellow card
MF	10	(Poland) Jakub Wójcicki		(substituted off) 72'
MF	8	(Portugal) Álvarinho		(substituted off) 55'
FW	5	(Portugal) Bernardo Vasconcelos	Yellow card
Substitutes:
GK	1	(Poland) Andrzej Witan
DF	18	(Poland) Damian Ciechanowski
MF	19	(Poland) Wahan Geworgian		(substituted on) 72'
MF	26	(Poland) Korneliusz Sochań		(substituted on) 46'
MF	30	(Poland) Maciej Kona
FW	23	(Cape Verde) Jorge Kadú		(substituted on) 78'
FW	28	(Brazil) Wágner		(substituted on) 55'
Manager:
(Portugal) Jorge Paixão

== See also ==
- 2014–15 Ekstraklasa
- 2014–15 Polish Cup
