= List of Polish football transfers winter 2017–18 =

This is a list of Polish football transfers in the 2017–18 winter transfer window by club. Only clubs in the 2017–18 Ekstraklasa are included.

== Ekstraklasa ==
=== Arka Gdynia ===
In:

No.	Pos.	Nation	Player
90	MF	(Ukraine) UKR	Andriy Bohdanov (From (Ukraine) Olimpik Donetsk)
16	FW	(Mexico) MEX	Enrique Esqueda
22	FW	(Poland) POL	Maciej Jankowski (From Piast Gliwice)
18	MF	(Poland) POL	Krzysztof Janus (From Zagłębie Lubin)
27	DF	(Greece) GRE	Achilleas Poungouras (Loan from (Greece) PAOK)

Out:

No.	Pos.	Nation	Player
19	MF	(Croatia) CRO	Filip Jazvić (To Olimpia Grudziądz)
22	DF	(Slovakia) SVK	Tomáš Košút (To (Hungary) Honvéd)
15	FW	(Poland) POL	Szymon Nowicki (Loan to Chrobry Głogów)
16	MF	(Spain) ESP	Álvaro Rey (To (Spain) Racing de Ferrol)
25	MF	(Poland) POL	Paweł Wojowski (Loan to Gryf Wejherowo, previously on loan at GKS Bełchatów)
44	FW	(Poland) POL	Michał Żebrakowski (Loan to Górnik Łęczna)

=== Bruk-Bet Termalica Nieciecza ===
In:

No.	Pos.	Nation	Player
6	DF	(Poland) POL	Rafał Grzelak (From (Scotland) Heart of Midlothian)
99	MF	(Serbia) SRB	Dejan Janjatović
22	MF	(Georgia (country)) GEO	Nika Kvantaliani (From (Georgia (country)) Dinamo Batumi)
14	DF	(Romania) ROU	Gabriel Matei (From (Azerbaijan) Zira)
30	MF	(Romania) ROU	Florin Purece (From (Israel) Hapoel Ra'anana)
3	DF	(Finland) FIN	Joona Toivio (From (Norway) Molde)

Out:

No.	Pos.	Nation	Player
8	DF	(Poland) POL	Patryk Fryc (To Puszcza Niepołomice)
99	MF	(Serbia) SRB	Dejan Janjatović
4	DF	(Hungary) HUN	Ákos Kecskés (Loan return to (Italy) Atalanta)
23	MF	(Poland) POL	Szczepan Kogut (Loan to GKS Bełchatów)
11	MF	(Slovakia) SVK	Patrik Mišák (Loan to (Hungary) Mezőkövesdi)
37	MF	(Poland) POL	Jakub Mrozik
33	MF	(Poland) POL	Krystian Peda (Loan to GKS Bełchatów)
9	MF	(Poland) POL	Bartłomiej Smuczyński
14	MF	(Poland) POL	Jakub Wróbel

=== Cracovia ===
In:

No.	Pos.	Nation	Player
44	FW	(Denmark) DEN	Nicolai Brock-Madsen (Loan from (England) Birmingham City)
7	MF	(Croatia) CRO	Antonini Čulina (From (Switzerland) Lugano)
20	DF	(Croatia) CRO	Niko Datković (From (Italy) Spezia)
92	FW	(Latvia) LVA	Deniss Rakels (Loan from (England) Reading)
27	GK	(Poland) POL	Krystian Stępniowski (Return from Pogoń Siedlce)

Out:

No.	Pos.	Nation	Player
26	DF	(Brazil) BRA	Deleu (To Miedź Legnica)
4	DF	(Poland) POL	Piotr Malarczyk (To Korona Kielce)
23	MF	(Slovakia) SVK	Jaroslav Mihalík (Loan to (Slovakia) Žilina)
29	GK	(Poland) POL	Grzegorz Sandomierski
46	DF	(Germany) GER	Lennard Sowah
17	MF	(Poland) POL	Sebastian Steblecki (Loan to Chojniczanka Chojnice)
20	FW	(Poland) POL	Mateusz Szczepaniak (Loan to Piast Gliwice)
9	FW	(Slovakia) SVK	Tomáš Vestenický (Loan to (Slovakia) Nitra)
7	DF	(Poland) POL	Jakub Wójcicki (To Jagiellonia Białystok)

=== Górnik Zabrze ===
In:

No.	Pos.	Nation	Player
55	DF	(Poland) POL	Paweł Bochniewicz (Loan from (Italy) Udinese)
32	DF	(Poland) POL	Adrian Gryszkiewicz (From Gwarek Zabrze)
36	MF	(Poland) POL	Bartosz Pikul (Return from Zagłębie Sosnowiec)
97	MF	(Poland) POL	Daniel Smuga (From Victoria Sulejówek)

Out:

No.	Pos.	Nation	Player
24	DF	(Germany) GER	Meik Karwot (Loan to Pogoń Siedlce)
11	FW	(Czech Republic) CZE	David Ledecký (Loan to Odra Opole)

=== Jagiellonia Białystok ===
In:

No.	Pos.	Nation	Player
67	DF	(Georgia (country)) GEO	Luka Asatiani (Return from Wigry Suwałki)
11	FW	(Slovenia) SVN	Roman Bezjak (From (Germany) Darmstadt 98)
19	DF	(Iceland) ISL	Böðvar Böðvarsson (From (Iceland) FH)
10	MF	(Slovenia) SVN	Dejan Lazarević
95	MF	(Poland) POL	Dawid Szymonowicz (Return from (Slovakia) Zlaté Moravce)
20	DF	(Poland) POL	Jakub Wójcicki (From Cracovia)

Out:

No.	Pos.	Nation	Player
10	MF	(Lithuania) LTU	Fiodor Černych (To (Russia) Dynamo Moscow)
2	DF	(Scotland) SCO	Ziggy Gordon
—	FW	(Poland) POL	Maciej Górski (Loan to Chojniczanka Chojnice, previously on loan at Korona Kielce)
7	MF	(Ukraine) UKR	Dmytro Khomchenovskyi (To (Russia) Ural Yekaterinburg)
44	FW	(Poland) POL	Łukasz Sekulski (To (Russia) SKA-Khabarovsk)
77	DF	(Poland) POL	Piotr Tomasik (To Lech Poznań)
96	GK	(Poland) POL	Damian Węglarz (Loan to Wigry Suwałki)

=== Korona Kielce ===
In:

No.	Pos.	Nation	Player
31	MF	(Bosnia and Herzegovina) BIH	Zlatko Janjić (From (Germany) MSV Duisburg)
17	FW	(Denmark) DEN	Sanel Kapidžić (From (Norway) Fredrikstad)
44	DF	(Hungary) HUN	Ákos Kecskés (Loan from (Italy) Atalanta)
4	DF	(Poland) POL	Piotr Malarczyk (From Cracovia)
13	MF	(Croatia) CRO	Oliver Petrak (From (Kazakhstan) Ordabasy)

Out:

No.	Pos.	Nation	Player
55	DF	(Greece) GRE	Ángelos Argýris
24	DF	(United States) USA	Shawn Barry (To (United States) Real Salt Lake)
16	FW	(Poland) POL	Maciej Górski (Return to Jagiellonia Białystok)
—	FW	(Germany) GER	Amer Halilić (Loan to (Bosnia and Herzegovina) NK Vitez, previously transfer from (Germany) FSV Wacker 90 Nordhausen II)
25	GK	(Ukraine) UKR	Leonid Otczenaszenko
90	FW	(Poland) POL	Piotr Poński
93	FW	(Poland) POL	Michał Smolarczyk

=== Lech Poznań ===
In:

No.	Pos.	Nation	Player
11	FW	(Ukraine) UKR	Oleksiy Khoblenko (Loan from (Ukraine) Chornomorets Odesa)
14	FW	(Bosnia and Herzegovina) BIH	Elvir Koljić (Loan from (Bosnia and Herzegovina) Krupa)
4	DF	(Norway) NOR	Thomas Rogne (From (Sweden) IFK Göteborg)
21	MF	(Poland) POL	Jakub Serafin (Return from (Norway) Haugesund)
77	DF	(Poland) POL	Piotr Tomasik (From Jagiellonia Białystok)

Out:

No.	Pos.	Nation	Player
5	MF	(Ghana) GHA	Abdul Aziz Tetteh (To (Russia) Dynamo Moscow)
14	FW	(Denmark) DEN	Nicki Bille Nielsen (To (Greece) Panionios)
20	MF	(Poland) POL	Dariusz Formella (Loan to Raków Częstochowa, previously on loan at Pogoń Szczecin)
24	FW	(Poland) POL	Dawid Kurminowski (Loan to (Slovakia) Zemplín Michalovce)
33	GK	(Poland) POL	Miłosz Mleczko (Loan to Puszcza Niepołomice)
3	DF	(Denmark) DEN	Lasse Nielsen (To (Sweden) Trelleborg)
27	DF	(Poland) POL	Tymoteusz Puchacz (Loan to Zagłębie Sosnowiec)
92	FW	(Latvia) LVA	Deniss Rakels (Return to (England) Reading)
28	DF	(Poland) POL	Marcin Wasielewski (Loan to Znicz Pruszków)

=== Lechia Gdańsk ===
In:

No.	Pos.	Nation	Player
16	MF	(Poland) POL	Ariel Borysiuk (From (England) Queens Park Rangers)
22	DF	(Serbia) SRB	Filip Mladenović (From (Belgium) Standard Liège)

Out:

No.	Pos.	Nation	Player
18	FW	(Poland) POL	Jakub Arak (Loan to Stal Mielec)
—	GK	(Poland) POL	Łukasz Budziłek (To Pogoń Szczecin, previously on loan at Wigry Suwałki)
38	MF	(Bulgaria) BUL	Milen Gamakov (Previously on loan at Stomil Olsztyn)
4	DF	(Brazil) BRA	Gerson (Previously on loan at (South Korea) Gangwon FC)
13	DF	(Poland) POL	Mateusz Lewandowski (Loan to Śląsk Wrocław)
32	MF	(Poland) POL	Mateusz Matras (To Zagłębie Lubin)
77	GK	(Poland) POL	Damian Podleśny (To Górnik Łęczna)

=== Legia Warsaw ===
In:

No.	Pos.	Nation	Player
7	MF	(Croatia) CRO	Domagoj Antolić (From (Croatia) Dinamo Zagreb)
9	FW	(Croatia) CRO	Eduardo (From (Brazil) Atlético Paranaense)
26	MF	(Portugal) POR	Cafú (Loan from (France) Metz)
40	MF	(United States) USA	Brian Iloski (From (United States) UCLA Bruins)
12	GK	(Latvia) LVA	Vjačeslavs Kudrjavcevs (From (Latvia) Riga FC)
17	MF	(Poland) POL	Mikołaj Kwietniewski (From (England) Fulham)
3	DF	(Brazil) BRA	Maurício (Loan from (Italy) Lazio)
6	MF	(Luxembourg) LUX	Chris Philipps (From (France) Metz)
44	DF	(France) FRA	William Rémy (From (France) Montpellier)
20	MF	(Montenegro) MNE	Marko Vešović (From (Croatia) Rijeka)

Out:

No.	Pos.	Nation	Player
27	FW	(Nigeria) NGA	Daniel Chima Chukwu (To (Norway) Molde)
4	DF	(Poland) POL	Jakub Czerwiński (Loan to Piast Gliwice)
5	DF	(Poland) POL	Maciej Dąbrowski (To Zagłębie Lubin)
6	MF	(Brazil) BRA	Guilherme (To (Italy) Benevento)
91	GK	(Poland) POL	Konrad Jałocha (Loan to GKS Tychy)
3	MF	(Poland) POL	Tomasz Jodłowiec (Loan to Piast Gliwice)
13	MF	(Poland) POL	Łukasz Moneta (Loan to Zagłębie Lubin)
75	MF	(France) FRA	Thibault Moulin (To (Greece) PAOK)
21	MF	(Hungary) HUN	Dominik Nagy (Loan to (Hungary) Ferencváros)
7	FW	(Portugal) POR	Hildeberto Pereira (Loan to (England) Northampton Town F.C.)
99	FW	(Albania) ALB	Armando Sadiku (To (Spain) Levante)
70	MF	(Poland) POL	Miłosz Szczepański (To Raków Częstochowa)
29	GK	(Poland) POL	Jakub Szumski (To Raków Częstochowa)
23	DF	(Poland) POL	Mateusz Żyro (Loan to Wigry Suwałki)

=== Piast Gliwice ===
In:

No.	Pos.	Nation	Player
4	DF	(Poland) POL	Jakub Czerwiński (Loan from Legia Warsaw)
13	GK	(Poland) POL	Karol Dybowski (From Siarka Tarnobrzeg)
6	DF	(England) ENG	Tom Hateley (From (Scotland) Dundee F.C.)
33	MF	(Poland) POL	Tomasz Jodłowiec (Loan from Legia Warsaw)
2	DF	(Denmark) DEN	Mikkel Kirkeskov (Loan from (Norway) Aalesund)
26	GK	(Slovakia) SVK	František Plach (From (Slovakia) Senica)
44	FW	(Poland) POL	Mateusz Szczepaniak (Loan from Cracovia)
—	DF	(Poland) POL	Bartosz Waleńcik (Return from Bytovia Bytów)

Out:

No.	Pos.	Nation	Player
90	FW	(Croatia) CRO	Josip Barišić (To (Croatia) Cibalia)
91	DF	(Brazil) BRA	Hebert (To (Japan) JEF United Chiba)
7	FW	(Poland) POL	Maciej Jankowski (To Arka Gdynia)
31	GK	(Slovakia) SVK	Dobrivoj Rusov
23	MF	(Bosnia and Herzegovina) BIH	Stojan Vranješ (To (Bosnia and Herzegovina) Željezničar Sarajevo)

=== Pogoń Szczecin ===
In:

No.	Pos.	Nation	Player
8	MF	(Poland) POL	Dawid Błanik (From GKS Tychy)
53	GK	(Poland) POL	Łukasz Budziłek (From Lechia Gdańsk)
13	FW	(Denmark) DEN	Morten Rasmussen (From (Denmark) AGF Aarhus)

Out:

No.	Pos.	Nation	Player
7	MF	(Hungary) HUN	Ádám Gyurcsó (Loan to (Croatia) Hajduk Split)
33	GK	(Poland) POL	Adrian Henger (To Ina Goleniów)
—	FW	(Poland) POL	Gracjan Jaroch (Loan to Błękitni Stargard, previously on loan at Miedź Legnica)
—	DF	(Poland) POL	Szymon Jopek (Loan to Stal Stalowa Wola)
8	MF	(Georgia (country)) GEO	Mate Tsintsadze (To (Georgia (country)) Metalurgi Rustavi)

=== Sandecja Nowy Sącz ===
In:

No.	Pos.	Nation	Player
77	DF	(Poland) POL	Jakub Bartosz (Loan from Wisła Kraków)
4	DF	(Romania) ROU	Alexandru Benga (From (Romania) Juventus București)
38	MF	(Slovakia) SVK	Jakub Grič (From (Slovakia) Zemplín Michalovce)
29	MF	(Ukraine) UKR	Pavlo Ksyonz (From (Ukraine) Karpaty Lviv)
66	MF	(Croatia) CRO	Damir Šovšić (From (South Korea) Suwon Samsung Bluewings)

Out:

No.	Pos.	Nation	Player
9	MF	(Poland) POL	Bartosz Gęsior (To Legia II Warsaw)
3	DF	(Czech Republic) CZE	Lukáš Kubáň (To Stomil Olsztyn)

=== Śląsk Wrocław ===
In:

No.	Pos.	Nation	Player
19	DF	(Poland) POL	Mateusz Lewandowski (Loan from Lechia Gdańsk)
21	DF	(Germany) GER	Tim Rieder (Loan from (Germany) FC Augsburg)

Out:

No.	Pos.	Nation	Player

=== Wisła Kraków ===
In:

No.	Pos.	Nation	Player
21	MF	(Croatia) CRO	Petar Brlek (Loan from (Italy) Genoa)
16	MF	(Serbia) SRB	Nikola Mitrović (From (Serbia) Napredak Kruševac)
29	DF	(Slovenia) SVN	Matej Palčič (From (Slovenia) Maribor)
27	DF	(Poland) POL	Marcin Wasilewski

Out:

No.	Pos.	Nation	Player
17	DF	(Poland) POL	Jakub Bartosz (Loan to Sandecja Nowy Sącz)
13	FW	(Poland) POL	Krzysztof Drzazga (Loan to Puszcza Niepołomice, previously on loan at Chojniczanka Chojnice)
21	MF	(Spain) ESP	Víctor Pérez (To (India) Bengaluru)
2	DF	(Poland) POL	Rafał Pietrzak (Loan to Zagłębie Lubin)
70	MF	(Portugal) POR	Zé Manuel (Return to (Portugal) Porto)

=== Wisła Płock ===
In:

No.	Pos.	Nation	Player
30	GK	(Germany) GER	Thomas Dähne (From (Finland) HJK)
16	FW	(Poland) POL	Oskar Zawada (From (Germany) Karlsruher SC)

Out:

No.	Pos.	Nation	Player
97	DF	(Poland) POL	Dawid Kieplin (Loan to Lechia Tomaszów Mazowiecki, previously on loan at Pogoń Siedlce)
45	FW	(Poland) POL	Mikołaj Lebedyński (Loan to Górnik Łęczna)
27	FW	(Poland) POL	Mateusz Piątkowski (To Miedź Legnica)
11	DF	(Romania) ROU	Paul Pîrvulescu (To (Romania) Gaz Metan Mediaș)

=== Zagłębie Lubin ===
In:

No.	Pos.	Nation	Player
5	DF	(Poland) POL	Maciej Dąbrowski (From Legia Warsaw)
29	GK	(Poland) POL	Piotr Leciejewski (From (Norway) Brann)
26	FW	(Czech Republic) CZE	Jakub Mareš (From (Slovakia) Slovan Bratislava)
28	MF	(Poland) POL	Mateusz Matras (From Lechia Gdańsk)
77	MF	(Poland) POL	Łukasz Moneta (Loan from Legia Warsaw)
21	FW	(Czech Republic) CZE	Martin Nešpor (Return from (Albania) Skënderbeu Korçë)
22	DF	(Poland) POL	Rafał Pietrzak (Loan from Wisła Kraków)
—	FW	(Poland) POL	Eryk Sobków (Return from Znicz Pruszków)

Out:

No.	Pos.	Nation	Player
—	MF	(Poland) POL	Sebastian Bonecki (Loan to Odra Opole)
5	DF	(Poland) POL	Jarosław Jach (To (England) Crystal Palace)
7	MF	(Poland) POL	Krzysztof Janus (To Arka Gdynia)
27	DF	(Poland) POL	Dominik Jończy (Loan to Chojniczanka Chojnice)
1	GK	(Slovakia) SVK	Martin Polaček (To (Czech Republic) Mladá Boleslav)
70	FW	(Poland) POL	Jakub Świerczok (To (Bulgaria) Ludogorets Razgrad)
