= 2018–19 Legia Warsaw season =

Legia Warsaw
2018-19 season
- Chairman: Dariusz Mioduski
- Manager: Dean Klafurić (14 April 2018 - 1 August 2018); Aleksandar Vuković (1 August 2018 - 13 August 2018); Ricardo Sá Pinto (13 August 2018 - 9 April 2019); Aleksandar Vuković (from 9 April 2019) (Interim)
- Stadium: Polish Army Stadium
- Ekstraklasa: 2nd
- Polish Cup: Quarterfinals
- UEFA Champions League: Second Qualifying Round
- UEFA Europa League: Third Qualifying Round
Home colours	Away colours	Third colours

The 2018–19 Legia Warsaw season is the club's 102nd season of existence, and their 82nd in the top flight of Polish football. Legia entered the 2018–19 season as the defending Ekstraklasa champions.

== Players ==
=== Current squad ===
As of 24 June 2019

Note: Flags indicate national team as defined under FIFA eligibility rules; some limited exceptions apply. Players may hold more than one non-FIFA nationality.

No.	Pos.	Nation	Player
1	GK	POL	Arkadiusz Malarz (vice-captain)
4	DF	POL	Mateusz Wieteska
6	MF	LUX	Chris Philipps
7	MF	CRO	Domagoj Antolić
11	FW	POL	Jarosław Niezgoda
16	DF	POR	Luís Rocha
20	MF	MNE	Marko Vešović
21	MF	HUN	Dominik Nagy
23	MF	POR	Salvador Agra
24	MF	POR	André Martins
26	MF	POR	Cafú
27	FW	ESP	Carlitos

No.	Pos.	Nation	Player
30	GK	POL	Radosław Majecki
33	GK	POL	Radosław Cierzniak
34	DF	ESP	Iñaki Astiz
35	GK	POL	Cezary Miszta
40	MF	POL	Michał Karbownik
41	DF	POL	Paweł Stolarski
44	DF	FRA	William Rémy
50	MF	POL	Mateusz Praszelik
55	DF	POL	Artur Jędrzejczyk
99	FW	CRO	Sandro Kulenović
—	MF	GEO	Valerian Gvilia

=== Out on loan ===
Note: Flags indicate national team as defined under FIFA eligibility rules; some limited exceptions apply. Players may hold more than one non-FIFA nationality.

No.	Pos.	Nation	Player
3	MF	POL	Tomasz Jodłowiec (at Piast Gliwice)
5	DF	POL	Mateusz Hołownia (at Śląsk Wrocław)
9	FW	FRA	Vamara Sanogo (at Zagłębie Sosnowiec)
12	FW	GHA	Sadam Sulley (at MFK Zemplín Michalovce)
13	MF	POL	Łukasz Moneta (at Bytovia Bytów)
15	MF	POL	Michał Kopczyński (at Wellington Phoenix)

No.	Pos.	Nation	Player
17	MF	POL	Mikołaj Kwietniewski (at Bytovia Bytów)
19	FW	GUI	José Kanté (at Gimnàstic de Tarragona)
23	DF	POL	Mateusz Żyro (at Miedź Legnica)
—	MF	POL	Tomasz Nawotka (at Zagłębie Sosnowiec)
—	MF	POL	Kacper Kostorz (at Podbeskidzie Bielsko-Biała)
—	MF	POL	Kacper Skibicki (at Olimpia Grudziądz)

=== Transfers ===
==== In ====
No.	Pos	Player	From	Type	Fee	Date	Source
4	DF	(Poland) Mateusz Wieteska	Górnik Zabrze	Transfer	500,000 zł	14 June 2018	
19	FW	(Guinea) José Kanté	Wisła Płock	Transfer	Free	18 June 2018	
27	FW	(Spain) Carlitos	Wisła Kraków	Transfer	Free	5 July 2018	
41	DF	(Poland) Paweł Stolarski	Lechia Gdańsk	Transfer		14 August 2018	
24	MF	(Portugal) André Martins	Olympiacos	Transfer	Free	6 September 2018	

==== Out ====
No.	Pos	Player	To	Type	Fee	Date	Source
4	DF	(Poland) Jakub Czerwiński	Piast Gliwice	Transfer	€275,000	30 May 2018	
3	DF	(Brazil) Maurício	S.S. Lazio	Loan	Loan end	9 June 2018	
3	DF	(Poland) Konrad Jałocha	GKS Tychy	Transfer	Free	15 June 2018	
28	DF	(Poland) Łukasz Broź	End of contract	Transfer	Free	20 June 2018	
19	DF	(Poland) Rafał Makowski	Zagłębie Sosnowiec	Transfer	Free	29 June 2018	
7	MF	(Portugal) Hildeberto Pereira	Vitória de Setúbal	Transfer	Unknown	2 August 2018	
77	MF	(Poland) Konrad Michalak	Lechia Gdańsk	Transfer	Unknown	14 August 2018	

== Competitions ==
=== Friendlies ===
17 June 2018 Friendly	Legia Warsaw	5 - 1	Mazur Karczew	Warsaw, Poland
18:30 CEST (UTC+2)		Report		Stadium: Polish Army Stadium

24 June 2018 Friendly	Legia Warsaw	3 - 2	Stal Mielec	Warka, Poland
17:00 CEST (UTC+2)		Report

30 June 2018 Friendly	Legia Warsaw	3 - 3	Górnik Łęczna	Warka, Poland
CEST (UTC+2)		Report		Stadium: Polish Army Stadium

4 July 2018 Friendly	Legia Warsaw	5 - 2	FC Viitorul Constanța	Warsaw, Poland
20:00 CEST (UTC+2)		Report		Stadium: Polish Army Stadium; Attendance: 3,000; Referee: Tomasz Kwiatkowski (Warsaw)

6 July 2018 Friendly	Legia Warsaw	0 - 0	Radomiak Radom	Warsaw, Poland
20:00 CEST (UTC+2)		Report		Stadium: Polish Army Stadium; Attendance: 500

=== Polish Super Cup ===
14 July 2018	Legia Warsaw	2–3	Arka Gdynia	Warsaw, Poland
20:30 CEST	Bodanov 2' (o.g.); Kanté (yellow card) 27'; Philipps 30' (yellow card) 53'; Mączyński (yellow card) 43'; Vešović (yellow card) 44'; Carlitos (yellow card) 61'; Szymański (yellow card) 62'; Kucharczyk (yellow card) 90+2'	Report	Zarandia 20'; Marić (yellow card) 31'; Bodanov 38'; Janota 45+3'; Nalepa (yellow card) 79'	Stadium: Polish Army Stadium; Attendance: 17,419; Referee: Mariusz Złotek

=== Polish Cup ===
25 September 2018 Round of 64	Chojniczanka Chojnice	0–1	Legia Warsaw	Chojnice
17:40 CEST		Report	Michał Pazdan 27'	Stadium: Stadion Miejski Chojniczanka; Attendance: 3,740; Referee: Wojciech Myć (Lublin)

30 October 2018 Round of 32	Piast Gliwice	1–1 (a.e.t.) (2–4 p)	Legia Warsaw	Gliwice
20:30	Jakub Czerwiński 118'		Carlitos 111'	Stadium: Stadion Piast; Attendance: 3,508; Referee: Tomasz Musiał (Kraków)

5 December 2018 Round of 16	Chrobry Głogów	0–3	Legia Warsaw	Głogów
20:30			Michał Kucharczyk 31'; Cafú 36', 82'	Stadium: GOS Stadium; Attendance: 2,670; Referee: Jarosław Przybył (Kluczbork)

13 March 2019 Quarter-final	Raków Częstochowa	2–1 (a.e.t.)	Legia Warsaw	Częstochowa
	Radosław Majecki 4' (o.g.); Andrzej Niewulis 112'		Michał Kucharczyk 30'	Stadium: Municipal Football Stadium Raków; Attendance: 3,990; Referee: Jarosław Przybył (Kluczbork)

=== Ekstraklasa ===
==== Regular season ====
21 July 2018 1	Legia Warsaw	1 - 3	Zagłębie Lubin	Warsaw, Poland
20:30 CEST (UTC+2)	Hloušek 37'; Vešović (yellow card) 62'; Żyro (yellow card) 78'	Report	Tuszyński 15', 87'; Starzyński 21' (pen.); Dąbrowski (yellow card) 58'	Stadium: Polish Army Stadium; Attendance: 12,278; Referee: Jarosław Przybył (Kluczbork)

28 July 2018 2	Korona Kielce	1 - 2	Legia Warsaw	Kielce, Poland
20:30 CEST (UTC+2)		Report		Stadium: Kielce City Stadium; Attendance: 10,806; Referee: Piotr Lasyk (Bytom)

4 August 2018 3	Legia Warsaw	0 - 0	Lechia Gdańsk	Warsaw, Poland
20:30 CEST (UTC+2)		Report		Stadium: Polish Army Stadium; Attendance: 16,153; Referee: Tomasz Musiał (Kraków)

12 August 2018 4	Piast Gliwice	1 - 3	Legia Warsaw	Gliwice, Poland
20:30 CEST (UTC+2)		Report		Attendance: 7,120

19 August 2018 5	Legia Warsaw	2 - 1	Zagłębie Sosnowiec	Warsaw, Poland
20:30 CEST (UTC+2)		Report		Stadium: Polish Army Stadium; Attendance: 16,122

26 August 2018 6	Legia Warsaw	1 - 4	Wisła Płock	Warsaw, Poland
20:30 CEST (UTC+2)		Report		Stadium: Polish Army Stadium; Attendance: 11,232

2 September 2018 7	KS Cracovia	0 - 0	Legia Warsaw	Kraków, Poland
18:00 CEST (UTC+2)		Report		Attendance: 8,123

16 September 2018 8	Legia Warsaw	1 - 0	Lech Poznań	Warsaw, Poland
18:00 CEST (UTC+2)				Stadium: Polish Army Stadium; Attendance: 22,731; Referee: Daniel Stefański (Bydgoszcz)

22 September 2018 9	Miedź Legnica	1 - 4	Legia Warsaw	Legnica, Poland
20:30 CEST (UTC+2)				Attendance: 5,875; Referee: Tomasz Musiał (Kraków)

28 September 2018 10	Legia Warsaw	1 - 1	Arka Gdynia	Warsaw, Poland
20:30 CEST (UTC+2)				Stadium: Polish Army Stadium; Attendance: 14,849; Referee: Paweł Gil (Lublin)

6 October 2018 11	Śląsk Wrocław	0 - 1	Legia Warsaw	Legnica, Poland
20:30 CEST (UTC+2)				Attendance: 20,084; Referee: Jarosław Przybył (Kluczbork)

21 October 2018 12	Legia Warsaw	3 - 3	Wisła Kraków	Warsaw, Poland
18:00 CEST (UTC+2)		Report		Stadium: Polish Army Stadium; Attendance: 22,797; Referee: Bartosz Frankowski (Toruń)

25 October 2018 13	Jagiellonia Białystok	1 - 1	Legia Warsaw	Białystok, Poland
CEST (UTC+2)		Report		Referee: Mariusz Złotek (Stalowa Wola)

3 November 2018 14	Legia Warsaw	4 - 0	Górnik Zabrze	Warsaw, Poland
CEST (UTC+2)		Report		Stadium: Polish Army Stadium; Attendance: 19,000; Referee: Wojciech Myć (Lublin)

9 November 2018 15	Pogoń Szczecin	2 – 1	Legia Warsaw	Szczecin, Poland
20:30 CEST (UTC+2)	Drygas 11'; Dvali (yellow card) 35'; Niepsuj (yellow card) 57'; Kowalczyk (yellow card) 58'; Kožulj 76'; Załuska (yellow card) 89'	Summary	Vešović (yellow card) 37'; Hloušek (yellow card) 57'; André Martins 90+2'	Stadium: Stadion Miejski im. Floriana Krygiera; Attendance: 13,564; Referee: Daniel Stefański

25 November 2018 16	Zagłębie Lubin	0 - 1	Legia Warsaw	Lubin, Poland
15:30 CEST (UTC+2)			William Rémy 9'	Stadium: Stadion Zagłębia Lubin; Attendance: 16,068

1 December 2018 17	Legia Warsaw	3 - 0	Korona Kielce	Warsaw, Poland
20:30 CEST (UTC+2)	Cafú 8'; Michał Kucharczyk 45+1'; Sebastian Szymański 87'		Iván Márquez Álvarez (red card) 51'	Stadium: Polish Army Stadium; Attendance: 18.443

9 December 2018 18	Lechia Gdańsk	0 - 0	Legia Warsaw	Gdańsk, Poland
18:00 CEST (UTC+2)				Stadium: Stadion Energa Gdańsk; Attendance: 20.856; Referee: Szymon Marciniak

15 December 2018 19	Legia Warsaw	2 - 0	Piast Gliwice	Warsaw, Poland
20:30 CEST (UTC+2)	Sandro Kulenović 20'; Carlitos 84'			Stadium: Polish Army Stadium

20 December 2018 20	Zagłębie Sosnowiec	2 - 3	Legia Warsaw	Sosnowiec, Poland
20:30 CEST (UTC+2)	Piotr Polczak 8'; Carlitos 48' (o.g.)		William Rémy 47'; Adam Hloušek 84'; Sandro Kulenović 88'	Stadium: Stadion Ludowy

10 February 2019 21	Wisła Płock	0 - 1	Legia Warsaw	Płock, Poland
CEST (UTC+2)				Attendance: 6,740

17 February 2019 22	Legia Warsaw	0 - 2	KS Cracovia	Warsaw, Poland
CEST (UTC+2)				Stadium: Polish Army Stadium; Attendance: 23,572

23 February 2019 23	Lech Poznań	2 - 0	Legia Warsaw	Poznań, Poland
CEST (UTC+2)				Attendance: 16,720

1 March 2019 24	Legia Warsaw	2 - 0	Miedź Legnica	Warsaw, Poland
CEST (UTC+2)				Stadium: Polish Army Stadium; Attendance: 21,362

9 March 2019 25	Arka Gdynia	1 - 2	Legia Warsaw	Gdynia, Poland
CEST (UTC+2)

16 March 2019 26	Legia Warsaw	1 - 0	Śląsk Wrocław	Warsaw, Poland
CEST (UTC+2)				Stadium: Polish Army Stadium

31 March 2019 27	Wisła Kraków	4 - 0	Legia Warsaw	Kraków, Poland
CEST (UTC+2)

3 April 2019 28	Legia Warsaw	3 - 0	Jagiellonia Białystok	Warsaw, Poland
CEST (UTC+2)				Stadium: Polish Army Stadium

6 April 2019 29	Górnik Zabrze	1 - 2	Legia Warsaw	Zabrze, Poland
CEST (UTC+2)

13 April 2019 30	Legia Warsaw	3 - 1	Pogoń Szczecin	Warsaw, Poland
CEST (UTC+2)				Stadium: Polish Army Stadium

===== League table =====
Pos	Team	Pld	W	D	L	GF	GA	GD	Pts	Qualification
1	Lechia Gdańsk	30	17	9	4	45	25	+20	60 (Note: Head-to-head record: Legia Warsaw 0–0 Lechia Gdańsk, Lechia Gdańsk 0–0 Legia Warsaw. Goal difference: Lechia Gdańsk (+20), Legia Warsaw (+17))	Qualification for the Championship round
2	Legia Warsaw	30	18	6	6	48	31	+17	60	Qualification for the Championship round
3	Piast Gliwice	30	15	8	7	47	31	+16	53	Qualification for the Championship round
4	Cracovia	30	14	6	10	39	34	+5	48	Qualification for the Championship round
5	Zagłębie Lubin	30	14	5	11	48	38	+10	47 (Note: Head-to-head record: Zagłębie Lubin 0–2 Jagiellonia Białystok, Jagiellonia Białystok 0–4 Zagłębie Lubin.)	Qualification for the Championship round

Source: Ekstraklasa, 90minut
Rules for classification: 1) Points; 2) Head-to-head points; 3) Head-to-head goal difference; 4) Head-to-head goals scored; 5) Head-to-head away goals scored (only if two teams); 6) Goal difference; 7) Goals scored; 8) Fairplay ranking; 9) Draw. (Note: Head-to-head record is used only after all the matches between the teams in question have been played.)

==== Championship Round ====
20 April 2019 31	Legia Warsaw	1 - 0	KS Cracovia	Warsaw
14:30 BST		Report		Attendance: 13,632

24 April 2019 32	Lech Poznań	1 - 0	Legia Warsaw	Poznań
17:00 BST		Report		Attendance: 11,935

27 April 2019 33	Lechia Gdańsk	1 - 3	Legia Warsaw	Gdańsk
		Report		Attendance: 25,000

4 May 2019 34	Legia Warsaw	0 - 1	Piast Gliwice	Warsaw
		Report

12 May 2019 35	Legia Warsaw	1 - 1	Pogoń Szczecin	Warsaw
		Report		Attendance: 22,161

15 May 2019 36	Jagiellonia Białystok	1 - 0	Legia Warsaw	Białystok
		Report		Attendance: 13,573

19 May 2019 37	Legia Warsaw	2 - 2	Zagłębie Lubin	Warsaw
		Report		Attendance: 23,000

Win Draw Loss

===== League table =====
Pos	Team	Pld	W	D	L	GF	GA	GD	Pts	Qualification
1	Piast Gliwice (C)	37	21	9	7	57	33	+24	72	Qualification for the Champions League first qualifying round
2	Legia Warsaw	37	20	8	9	55	38	+17	68	Qualification for the Europa League first qualifying round
3	Lechia Gdańsk	37	19	10	8	54	38	+16	67	Qualification for the Europa League second qualifying round (Note: Lechia Gdańsk qualified for the Europa League second qualifying round by winning the 2018–19 Polish Cup.)
4	Cracovia	37	17	6	14	45	43	+2	57 (Note: Points in regular season: Cracovia 48 points, Jagiellonia Białystok 47 points.)	Qualification for the Europa League first qualifying round
5	Jagiellonia Białystok	37	16	9	12	55	52	+3	57	

Source: Ekstraklasa, 90minut
Rules for classification: 1) Points; 2) Points in regular season; 3) Head-to-head points in regular season; 4) Head-to-head goal difference in regular season; 5) Head-to-head goals scored in regular season; 5) Head-to-head away goals scored in regular season (if only two teams); 7) Goal difference; 8) Goals scored; 9) Fairplay ranking; 10) Play-off (only if needed to decide champion, teams for relegation or teams for UEFA competitions).
(C) Champions

=== Champions League ===
==== First qualifying round ====
10 July 2018	Cork City (Republic of Ireland)	0–1	(Poland) Legia Warsaw	Turners Cross, Cork
20:45 (19:45 IST)	McCormack (yellow card) 35'; McNamee (yellow card) 41'; Buckley (yellow card) 78'	Report	Kucharczyk 79'	Attendance: 5,795; Referee: Radu Petrescu (Romania)

17 July 2018	Legia Warsaw (Poland)	3–0	(Republic of Ireland) Cork City	Polish Army Stadium, Warsaw
20:45	Kanté 28'; Astiz (yellow card) 66'; Radović 73' (pen.); Carlitos 89'	Report		Attendance: 12,573; Referee: Kai Erik Steen (Norway)

Legia Warsaw won 4–0 on aggregate.

==== Second qualifying round ====
24 July 2018	Legia Warsaw (Poland)	0–2	(Slovakia) Spartak Trnava	Polish Army Stadium, Warsaw
21:00		Report	Grendel 16'; Vlasko 90+3'	Attendance: 15,527; Referee: Ádám Farkas (Hungary)

31 July 2018	Spartak Trnava (Slovakia)	0–1	(Poland) Legia Warsaw	Štadión Antona Malatinského, Trnava
20:30		Report	Astiz 63'	Attendance: 17,204; Referee: Roi Reinshreiber (Israel)

Spartak Trnava won 2–1 on aggregate.

=== Europa League ===
==== Third qualifying round ====
9 August 2018	Legia Warsaw (Poland)	1–2	(Luxembourg) F91 Dudelange	Polish Army Stadium, Warsaw
21:00	Carlitos 27'	Report	Couturier 24'; Turpel 62' (pen.)	Attendance: 9,923; Referee: Halis Özkahya (Turkey)

16 August 2018	F91 Dudelange (Luxembourg)	2–2	(Poland) Legia Warsaw	Stade Josy Barthel, Luxembourg City (Note: F91 Dudelange played their third qualifying and play-off rounds home matches at Stade Josy Barthel, Luxembourg City, instead of their regular stadium Stade Jos Nosbaum, Dudelange.)
20:00	Stumpf 7'; Stélvio 17'	Report	Kanté 33', 86'	Attendance: 2,000; Referee: Ivaylo Stoyanov (Bulgaria)

F91 Dudelange won 4–3 on aggregate.
