= Jałocha =

Jałocha or Jalocha is a Polish surname. It may refer to:

- Jan Jałocha (born 1957), Polish footballer
- Konrad Jałocha (born 1991), Polish footballer
- Marcin Jałocha (born 1971), Polish footballer
