= Witan (disambiguation) =

The Witan was a council of noblemen in Anglo-Saxon England.

Witan may also refer to:

- Witan International College
- Witan Investment Trust
- Witan (surname), a family name
- Witan Sulaeman (born 2001), Indonesian footballer
