= Maciej Joczys =

Polish footballer

Personal information
- Date of birth: 11 March 1992 (age 34)
- Place of birth: Warsaw, Poland
- Height: 1.91 m (6 ft 3 in)
- Position: Defender

Senior career*
Years	Team	Apps	(Gls)
2011–2013	Polonia Warsaw (MESA)	51	(1)
2013	Polonia Warsaw	1	(0)
2014	GLKS Nadarzyn		
2014	Mazowsze Grójec		(0)
2015	KS Warka		(2)
2018–2021	Weszło Warsaw	39	(7)
2023–2024	FFK Warsaw	14	(2)
- * Club domestic league appearances and goals

Maciej Joczysz (born 11 March 1992) is a Polish former professional footballer who played as a defender. He made one Ekstraklasa appearance for Polonia Warsaw in a 3–1 loss against Pogoń Szczecin on 2 June 2013.

== Honours ==
KS Warka

- Regional league Radom: 2014–15

KTS Weszło

- Klasa A Warsaw I: 2020–21
- Klasa B Warsaw III: 2018–19
