= Paweł Strąk =

Polish footballer

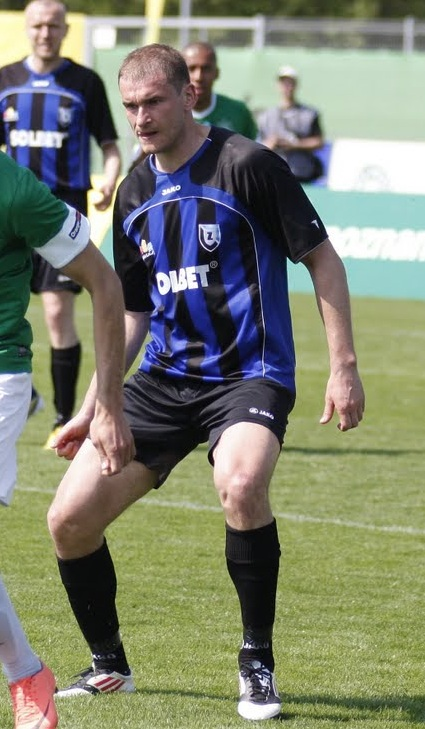
- Strąl with Zawisza Bydgoszcz in 2013

Personal information
- Full name: Paweł Strąk
- Date of birth: 24 March 1983 (age 43)
- Place of birth: Ostrowiec Świętokrzyski, Poland
- Height: 1.89 m (6 ft 2 in)
- Position: Defender

Youth career
- 1997–1998: Alit Ożarów

Senior career*
| Years | Team | Apps | (Gls) |
| 1998–2004 | Wisła Kraków | 37 | (0) |
| 1999 | → Hutnik Kraków (loan) | | |
| 2001–2002 | → Orlen Płock (loan) | | |
| 2004–2005 | Zagłębie Lubin | 28 | (1) |
| 2006–2008 | GKS Bełchatów | 62 | (2) |
| 2008 | SV Ried | 9 | (0) |
| 2008–2010 | Górnik Zabrze | 44 | (3) |
| 2011–2012 | Górnik Zabrze II | | |
| 2012 | → Zawisza Bydgoszcz (loan) | 13 | (0) |
| 2012–2015 | Zawisza Bydgoszcz | 57 | (0) |

International career
- Poland U16
- Poland U18
- Poland U21
Medal record
Men's football
Representing Poland
UEFA European Under-16 Championship
| Runner-up | 1999 Czech Republic |
- * Club domestic league appearances and goals

Paweł Strąk (born 24 March 1983) is a Polish former professional footballer who played as a defender.

== Career ==
=== Club ===
His former clubs include Wisła Kraków and Zagłębie Lubin. In June 2008, he signed a two-year-contract with the Austrian club SV Ried. In December 2008, he signed with Górnik Zabrze.

=== National team ===
Strąk is a former Poland U21s member. In 2002, he was also called up to the senior national team for a game against Denmark but did not play.

== Honours ==
Wisła Kraków

- Ekstraklasa: 2002–03, 2003–04
- Polish Cup: 2002–03

Zawisza Bydgoszcz

- I liga: 2012–13
- Polish Cup: 2013–14
- Polish Super Cup: 2014

Poland U16

- UEFA European Under-16 Championship runner-up: 1999
