= III liga, group A =

III liga, group A was one of 8 groups of III liga, the fourth level of the Polish football league system. The group was created in the 2008–09 season and existed until the end of the 2015–16 season. The teams from Łódź and Masovian voivodeships took part in the competition. Ahead of the 2016–17 season, the group was merged with group B to form III liga, group I.

== Top finishers ==
Season	Champion	Runner-up	Third place
2008–09	**Świt Nowy Dwór Mazowiecki**	GLKS Nadarzyn	Narew Ostrołęka
2009–10	**GLKS Nadarzyn**	Radomiak Radom	KS Piaseczno
2010–11	**Pogoń Siedlce**	Broń Radom	Włókniarz Zelów
2011–12	**Radomiak Radom**	MKS Kutno	Legionovia Legionowo
2012–13	**Legionovia Legionowo**	Sokół Aleksandrów Łódzki	Ursus Warsaw
2013–14	Ursus Warsaw	Broń Radom	Legia Warsaw II
2014–15	**Radomiak Radom**	Ursus Warsaw	Broń Radom
2015–16	**Polonia Warsaw**	Ursus Warsaw	Sokół Aleksandrów Łódzki

Note: Teams in bold won promotion either directly or via promotion play-offs.

== Results ==
=== 2008–09 season ===
Final table

Pos	Club	M	P	W	D	L	GF	GA	GD
1	Świt Nowy Dwór Mazowiecki	30	78	24	6	0	69	21	48
2	GLKS Nadarzyn	30	61	18	7	5	52	29	23
3	Narew Ostrołęka	30	48	12	12	6	34	21	13
4	Warta Sieradz	30	48	14	6	10	36	26	10
5	Nadnarwianka Pułtusk	30	48	15	3	12	40	34	6
6	Mazur Karczew	30	48	13	9	8	34	24	10
7	UKS SMS Łódź	30	45	13	6	11	42	31	11
8	MKS Kutno	30	45	13	6	11	48	39	9
9	Legionovia Legionowo	30	41	11	8	11	32	26	6
10	Omega Kleszczów	30	40	10	10	10	37	34	3
11	Stal Niewiadów	30	36	9	9	12	32	42	-10
12	Wisła Płock II	30	34	10	4	16	47	52	-5
13	Włókniarz Konstantynów Lódzki	30	32	8	8	14	26	35	-9
14	Broń Radom	30	28	9	1	20	30	59	-29
15	Woy Bukowiec Opoczyński	30	19	4	7	19	28	57	-29
16	Mazowsze Grójec	30	14	2	8	20	23	80	-57

=== 2009–10 season ===
Final table

Pos	Club	M	P	W	D	L	GF	GA	GD
1	GLKS Nadarzyn	30	66	20	6	4	51	21	30
2	Radomiak Radom	30	63	19	6	5	59	23	36
3	KS Piaseczno	30	58	16	10	4	50	23	27
4	Pogoń Siedlce	30	52	15	7	8	49	40	9
5	MKS Kutno	30	50	15	5	10	59	42	17
6	Mazur Karczew	30	47	14	5	11	41	30	11
7	Warta Sieradz	30	45	12	9	9	40	38	2
8	Narew Ostrołęka	30	44	13	5	12	47	41	6
9	Legionovia Legionowo	30	39	10	9	11	32	41	-9
10	Włókniarz Zelów	30	39	10	9	11	30	33	-3
11	UKS SMS Łódź	30	36	10	6	14	39	34	5
12	Omega Kleszczów	30	33	8	9	13	36	41	-5
13	Nadnarwianka Pułtusk	30	32	9	5	16	31	41	-10
14	Wisła Płock II	30	30	9	3	18	43	63	-20
15	Pogoń-Ekolog Zduńska Wola	30	26	7	5	18	30	56	-26
16	Stal Niewiadów	30	8	1	5	24	11	81	-70
