= Piotr Petasz =

Polish footballer

Personal information
- Full name: Piotr Petasz
- Date of birth: 27 June 1984 (age 42)
- Place of birth: Warsaw, Poland
- Height: 1.87 m (6 ft 1 1/2 in)
- Position: Defender

Team information
- Current team: Błonianka Błonie
- Number: 23

Youth career
- Polonia Warsaw
- GLKS Nadarzyn
- 2000–2001: Okęcie Warsaw
- 2001–2003: GLKS Nadarzyn
- 2003–2004: Legia Warsaw

Senior career*
Years	Team	Apps	(Gls)
2004–2005	Mazowsze Grójec		
2005–2006	Ruch Chorzów	16	(1)
2006	ŁKS Łomża	5	(0)
2006–2007	Jagiellonia Białystok	4	(0)
2007	ŁKS Łomża	16	(4)
2008	Piast Gliwice	11	(2)
2008–2011	Pogoń Szczecin	73	(18)
2012	Wisła Płock	12	(0)
2012–2015	Zawisza Bydgoszcz	52	(5)
2015	GKS Katowice	8	(1)
2015–2016	Dolcan Ząbki	17	(0)
2016–2017	Polonia Warsaw	12	(0)
2017	Huragan Wołomin	11	(2)
2018	Weszło Warsaw	1	(0)
2019–2021	Huragan Wołomin	59	(9)
2022–2025	Mszczonowianka Mszczonów	77	(10)
2025–	Błonianka Błonie	14	(0)
- * Club domestic league appearances and goals as of 17:31, 16 June 2025 (UTC)

Piotr Petasz (born 27 June 1984) is a Polish professional footballer who plays as a defender for Błonianka Błonie.

== Honours ==
Zawisza Bydgoszcz

- I liga: 2012–13
- Polish Cup: 2013–14
- Polish Super Cup: 2014

Polonia Warsaw

- III liga Łódź–Masovia: 2015–16

Huragan Wołomin

- IV liga Masovia North: 2018–19
