= Łukasz Broź =

Polish footballer (born 1985)

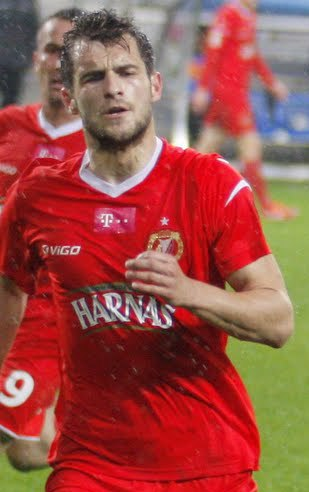
- Broź with Widzew Łódź in 2013

Personal information
- Full name: Łukasz Broź
- Date of birth: 17 December 1985 (age 40)
- Place of birth: Giżycko, Poland
- Height: 1.80 m (5 ft 11 in)
- Position: Defender

Team information
- Current team: Olimpia Gmina Miłki
- Number: 28

Youth career
- ABC Bagbud Giżycko

Senior career*
Years	Team	Apps	(Gls)
2004–2005	Mamry Giżycko		
2005–2006	Kmita Zabierzów		
2006–2013	Widzew Łódź	173	(11)
2013–2018	Legia Warsaw	99	(1)
2014–2015	Legia Warsaw II	2	(0)
2018–2020	Śląsk Wrocław	37	(3)
2021	KS Kutno	9	(0)
2021–2022	Mamry Giżycko	31	(4)
2022–2024	Mazovia Mińsk Mazowiecki	60	(7)
2025–2026	Tygrys Huta Mińska	29	(2)
2026–	Olimpia Gmina Miłki	1	(1)

International career
2012–2014	Poland	3	(0)
- * Club domestic league appearances and goals as of 18:53, 17 August 2026 (UTC)

Łukasz Broź (born 17 December 1985) is a Polish professional footballer who plays as a defender for Klasa B club Olimpia Gmina Miłki.

== Career statistics ==
As of match played 15 August 2026

Appearances and goals by club, season and competition
Club	Season	League			Polish Cup		Europe		Other		Total	
Club	Season	Division	Apps	Goals	Apps	Goals	Apps	Goals	Apps	Goals	Apps	Goals
Widzew Łódź	2006–07	Ekstraklasa	17	0	1	0	—		3 (Note: Appearance(s) in Ekstraklasa Cup)	0	21	0
Widzew Łódź	2007–08	Ekstraklasa	21	0	1	0	—		1	0	23	0
Widzew Łódź	2008–09	I liga	29	0	1	0	—		—		30	0
Widzew Łódź	2009–10	I liga	31	1	2	0	—		—		33	1
Widzew Łódź	2010–11	Ekstraklasa	29	1	2	0	—		—		31	1
Widzew Łódź	2011–12	Ekstraklasa	18	1	0	0	—		—		18	1
Widzew Łódź	2012–13	Ekstraklasa	28	8	1	0	—		—		29	8
Widzew Łódź	Total		173	11	8	0	—		4	0	185	11
Legia Warsaw	2013–14	Ekstraklasa	24	0	1	0	3 (Note: One appearance in UEFA Champions League, two appearances in UEFA Europa League)	0	—		28	0
Legia Warsaw	2014–15	Ekstraklasa	22	0	5	1	14 (Note: Four appearances in UEFA Champions League, ten appearances in UEFA Europa League)	0	0	0	41	1
Legia Warsaw	2015–16	Ekstraklasa	20	0	5	1	6 (Note: Appearance(s) in UEFA Europa League)	0	1 (Note: Appearance in Polish Super Cup)	0	32	1
Legia Warsaw	2016–17	Ekstraklasa	13	0	0	0	8 (Note: Six appearances in UEFA Champions League, two appearances in UEFA Europa League)	0	1	0	22	0
Legia Warsaw	2017–18	Ekstraklasa	20	1	4	1	1 (Note: Appearance in UEFA Champions League)	0	0	0	25	2
Legia Warsaw	Total		99	1	15	3	32	0	2	0	148	4
Legia Warsaw II	2013–14	III liga, gr. A	1	0	—		—		—		1	0
Legia Warsaw II	2015–16	III liga, gr. A	1	0	—		—		—		1	0
Legia Warsaw II	Total		2	0	—		—		—		2	0
Śląsk Wrocław	2018–19	Ekstraklasa	22	0	3	0	—		—		25	0
Śląsk Wrocław	2019–20	Ekstraklasa	15	3	0	0	—		—		15	3
Śląsk Wrocław	Total		37	3	3	0	—		—		40	3
KS Kutno	2020–21	III liga, gr. I	9	0	—		—		—		9	0
Mamry Giżycko	2021–22	III liga, gr. I	31	4	—		—		—		31	4
Mazovia Mińsk Mazowiecki	2022–23	IV liga Masovia	30	3	—		—		—		30	3
Mazovia Mińsk Mazowiecki	2023–24	IV liga Masovia	30	4	—		—		—		30	4
Mazovia Mińsk Mazowiecki	Total		60	7	—		—		—		60	7
Tygrys Huta Mińska	2024–25	IV liga Masovia	16	1	—		—		—		16	1
Tygrys Huta Mińska	2025–26	V liga Masovia II	13	1	—		—		—		13	1
Tygrys Huta Mińska	Total		29	2	—		—		—		29	2
Olimpia Gmina Miłki	2026–27	Klasa B Warm.-Mas. II	1	1	—		—		—		1	1
Career total			441	29	26	3	32	0	6	0	505	32

=== International ===
Appearances and goals by national team and year
National team	Year	Apps	Goals
Poland
Poland	2012	1	0
Poland	2013	1	0
Poland	2014	1	0
Total		3	0

== Honours ==
Kmita Zabierzów

- III liga, group IV: 2005–06

Widzew Łódź

- I liga: 2008–09, 2009–10

Legia Warsaw

- Ekstraklasa: 2013–14, 2015–16, 2016–17, 2017–18
- Polish Cup: 2014–15, 2015–16, 2017–18
