= Alvarinho (footballer) =

Portuguese footballer

Personal information
- Full name: Álvaro Ricardo Faustino Gomes
- Date of birth: 3 September 1990 (age 36)
- Place of birth: Faro, Portugal
- Height: 1.70 m (5 ft 7 in)
- Position: Winger

Youth career
- 2000–2009: Farense

Senior career*
Years	Team	Apps	(Gls)
2009–2010	Farense	27	(7)
2010–2012	Paços Ferreira	1	(0)
2011–2012	→ Fátima (loan)	8	(0)
2012	→ Torreense (loan)	4	(0)
2012–2014	Benfica Castelo Branco	46	(14)
2014–2015	Zawisza Bydgoszcz	45	(10)
2015–2017	Jagiellonia Białystok	10	(0)
2015–2016	Jagiellonia Białystok II	13	(3)
2016–2017	→ Śląsk Wrocław (loan)	23	(1)
2016–2017	→ Śląsk Wrocław II (loan)	1	(1)
2017–2021	Farense	51	(5)
2021–2022	Louletano	19	(9)
2022–2023	Ethnikos Achna	24	(3)
2023–2024	Anadia	26	(6)
2024–2025	Moncarapachense	25	(5)
Total		323	(64)
- * Club domestic league appearances and goals

Álvaro Ricardo Faustino Gomes (born 3 September 1990), known as Alvarinho, is a Portuguese former professional footballer who played as a winger.

He played five Primeira Liga games for Paços de Ferreira and Farense, nearly a decade apart, as well as 37 matches and four goals in the second tier for the latter. Abroad, he represented three clubs in the Polish Ekstraklasa, winning the national cup with Zawisza Bydgoszcz in 2014.

== Club career ==
=== Early career ===
Born in Faro, Algarve, Alvarinho began his career at hometown club S.C. Farense in 2009 before a transfer to F.C. Paços de Ferreira a year later. He made his professional debut in his only Primeira Liga appearance for the latter, a 5–1 home win over Académica de Coimbra on the last day of the 2010–11 season, coming on as a 77th-minute substitute for Manuel José.

A serious injury limited Alvarinho's prospects at Paços, and after loans to third division sides C.D. Fátima and S.C.U. Torreense, he joined Sport Benfica e Castelo Branco of the same tier in 2012.

=== Poland ===
Halfway through the 2013–14 campaign, after he scored seven goals with Benfica, Alvarinho and strike partner Marocas trained at Zawisza Bydgoszcz of the Polish Ekstraklasa, and the former eventually made the move permanent. He won the Polish Cup also that year, playing the final nine minutes of extra time in place of Jakub Wójcicki; the game finished goalless and he scored in the penalty shootout against Zagłębie Lubin at the Kazimierz Górski National Stadium.

On 9 July 2014, now under compatriot manager Jorge Paixão, Alvarinho scored as Zawisza defeated league champions Legia Warsaw 3–2 at the Polish Army Stadium in the Polish Super Cup. However, his team was relegated in 2015 and he remained in the top flight, signing for Jagiellonia Białystok on 20 August. A year later, he was loaned to a third team of the league, Śląsk Wrocław.

=== Return to Portugal ===
On 30 August 2017, Alvarinho returned to Farense and the Portuguese third tier, now renamed Campeonato de Portugal. In his first season they were promoted to LigaPro as runners-up to C.D. Mafra, and at the end of the second, he signed a new two-year contract featuring an undisclosed release clause.

In 2019–20, Farense won promotion to the top flight by being in second when the season was abandoned due to the COVID-19 pandemic; Alvarinho's one goal came from the bench in a 3–1 home victory over Casa Pia A.C. on the first matchday. After making just four brief cameos as the team went straight back down, he moved to nearby Louletano D.C. in the fourth tier, calling it the "best decision".

== Honours ==
Zawisza Bydgoszcz

- Polish Cup: 2013–14
- Polish Super Cup: 2014
