= Witan (surname) =

Witan is a surname. Notable people with the surname include:

- Andrzej Witan (born 1990), Polish footballer
- Iga Baumgart-Witan (born 1989), Polish sprinter
