= Adrian Basta =

Polish footballer

Personal information
- Full name: Adrian Basta
- Date of birth: 1 December 1988 (age 37)
- Place of birth: Nowy Sącz, Poland
- Height: 1.80 m (5 ft 11 in)
- Position: Defender

Team information
- Current team: LKS Czeluśnica

Youth career
- –2005: Sandecja Nowy Sącz

Senior career*
Years	Team	Apps	(Gls)
2006	Sandecja Nowy Sącz II		
2006–2008	Kolejarz Stróże	30	(2)
2008–2010	Polonia Bytom	7	(0)
2010–2012	Kolejarz Stróże	41	(2)
2012–2015	GKS Bełchatów	73	(6)
2015–2017	Górnik Łęczna	3	(0)
2017–2022	Sandecja Nowy Sącz	74	(2)
2022	Hutnik Kraków	6	(0)
2022–2024	Barciczanka Barcice	59	(7)
2024–2025	Poprad Muszyna	26	(0)
2025–	LKS Czeluśnica	0	(0)

International career
2009–2010	Poland U21	5	(0)
- * Club domestic league appearances and goals as of 08:58, 19 June 2025 (UTC)

Adrian Basta (born 1 December 1988) is a Polish professional footballer who plays as a defender for IV liga Subcarpathia club LKS Czeluśnica.

== Honours ==
GKS Katowice

- I liga: 2013–14

Sandecja Nowy Sącz

- I liga: 2016–17

Barciczanka Barcice

- Polish Cup (Nowy Sącz regionals): 2022–23
