= Grzegorz Sandomierski =

Polish footballer (born 1989)

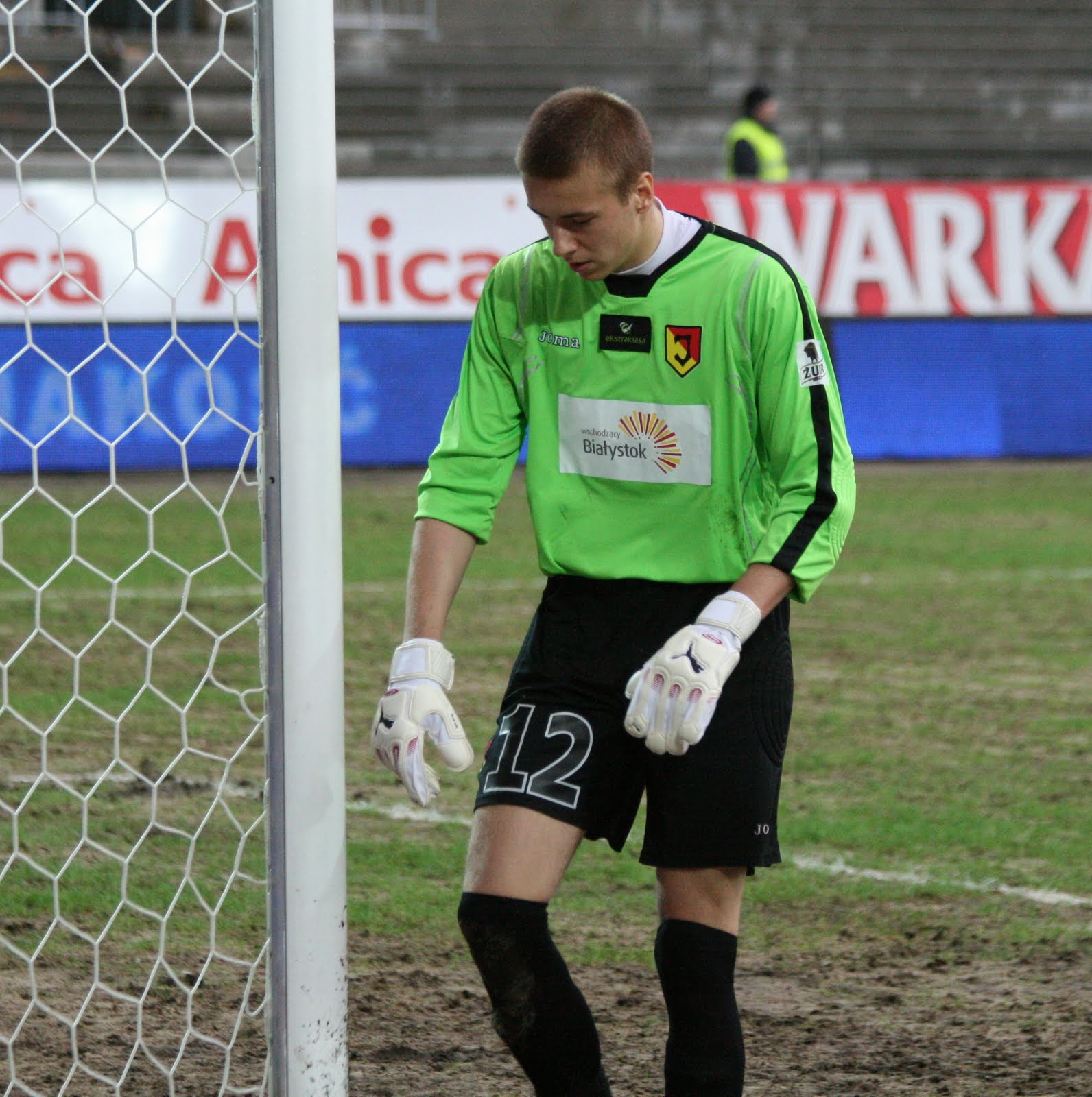
- Sandomierski with Jagiellonia Białystok in 2010

Personal information
- Date of birth: 5 September 1989 (age 37)
- Place of birth: Białystok, Poland
- Height: 1.96 m (6 ft 5 in)
- Position: Goalkeeper

Team information
- Current team: Jagiellonia Białystok (assistant goalkeeping coach); Poland U19 (goalkeeping coach)

Youth career
- 2002–2006: Jagiellonia Białystok

Senior career*
Years	Team	Apps	(Gls)
2006–2007	Jagiellonia Białystok II	10	(0)
2007	→ Lech Poznań II (loan)	2	(0)
2007–2011	Jagiellonia Białystok	58	(0)
2009	→ Ruch WM (loan)	15	(0)
2011–2014	Genk	0	(0)
2012	→ Jagiellonia Białystok (loan)	13	(0)
2012–2013	→ Blackburn Rovers (loan)	8	(0)
2013–2014	→ Dinamo Zagreb (loan)	6	(0)
2014–2015	Zawisza Bydgoszcz	28	(0)
2015–2018	Cracovia	79	(0)
2018–2019	Jagiellonia Białystok	15	(0)
2020–2021	CFR Cluj	12	(0)
2021–2022	Górnik Zabrze	20	(0)
2022–2023	Levadiakos	0	(0)
Total		266	(0)

International career
2008–2009	Poland U19	5	(0)
2009–2010	Poland U21	2	(0)
2010–2012	Poland	3	(0)
- * Club domestic league appearances and goals

Grzegorz Sandomierski (Polish pronunciation: [ˈɡʐɛɡɔʂ sandɔˈmjɛrskʲi]; born 5 September 1989) is a Polish former professional footballer who played as a goalkeeper. He currently serves as the assistant goalkeeping coach of Ekstraklasa club Jagiellonia Białystok, and the head goalkeeping coach of the Poland national under-19 team.

At international level, Sandomierski has represented the Poland senior team at UEFA Euro 2012.

== Club career ==
=== Jagiellonia Bialystok ===
Sandomierski's career began at Jagiellonia Białystok, starting in the reserve side from 2006. He played in four games and then was loaned out to Lech Poznań. He made two appearances in the fourth division, after which he returned to Jagiellonia. In the 2007–08 season, due to an injury to Jacek Banaszyński, Sandomierski made his Ekstraklasa debut against Cracovia in which he conceded two goals. By the end of the competition, he appeared in four other matches. Sandomierski then sustained a serious injury which excluded him from play for half a year. In January 2009, he was loaned to Ruch Wysokie Mazowieckie, where he played as a first choice goalkeeper. Prior to the 2009–10 season, he returned to Białystok. Sandomierski got his chance for Jagiellonia after Rafał Gikiewicz suffered a poor run of form. During his time at Jagiellonia, for six matches in a row, Sandomierski kept a clean sheet. His streak lasted 564 minutes, a club record, and ended in a clash with Ruch Chorzów.

=== Genk ===
In August 2011, Sandomierski signed a five-year contract with Belgian champions Genk, as a replacement for Thibaut Courtois.

=== Blackburn Rovers ===
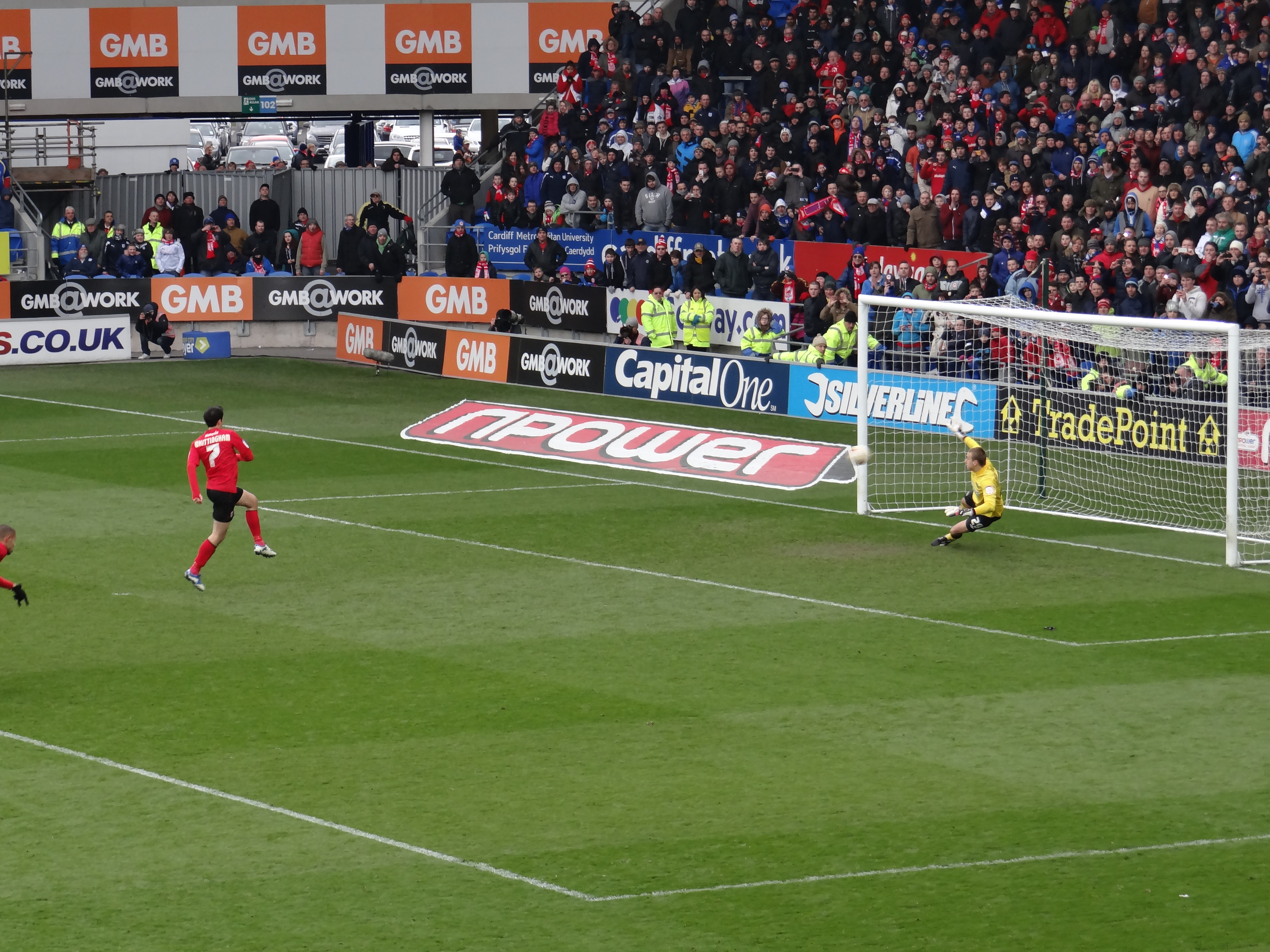
Sandomierski playing for Blackburn Rovers

On 31 August 2012, Sandomierski signed on a season long loan with Blackburn Rovers with a view to signing long-term.

He made his debut for Rovers against Cardiff City in a 3–0 defeat conceding two goals one of which was a penalty, coming on for injured counterpart Jake Kean in the 52nd minute. Sandomierski's second appearance came against Sheffield Wednesday after it was announced that Kean would miss the remainder of the season through injury. Caretaker manager Gary Bowyer expressed his faith in the Polish international, however Rovers were beaten 3–2 on the day. His next match saw him gain two impressive clean sheets against Derby County and Huddersfield Town. He then conceded four goals against Watford in a not so impressive match. In his next match against Millwall he only conceded one goal but had a fairly comfortable game.

== Coaching career ==
On 13 January 2023, at the age of 33, he ended his professional football career. In July 2023, he joined Jagiellonia Białystok's under-19 team and KS Turośnianka as a goalkeeping coach.

In June 2024, he left Turośnianka to focus on his duties at Jagiellonia. A year later, he was promoted to the role of assistant goalkeeping coach for Jagiellonia Białystok's senior team.

In August 2025, Sandomierski joined the Poland under-18s' coaching staff.

== Honours ==
Jagiellonia Białystok

- Polish Cup: 2009–10
- Polish Super Cup: 2010

Dinamo Zagreb

- Prva HNL: 2013–14

Zawisza Bydgoszcz

- Polish Super Cup: 2014

CFR Cluj

- Liga I: 2019–20, 2020–21
- Supercupa României: 2020

Individual

- Polish Newcomer of the Year: 2010
- Ekstraklasa Player of the Month: October 2009, March 2015
