= Vahan Gevorgyan =

Armenian-born Polish footballer

Personal information
- Full name: Vahan Gevorgyan
- Date of birth: 19 December 1981 (age 44)
- Place of birth: Yerevan, Armenian SSR, Soviet Union
- Height: 1.72 m (5 ft 7 1/2 in)
- Position: Midfielder

Youth career
- 1999: Petrochemia Płock

Senior career*
Years	Team	Apps	(Gls)
1999–2008	Wisła Płock	198	(25)
2007	→ Jagiellonia Białystok (loan)	8	(0)
2008–2009	ŁKS Łódź	19	(3)
2009–2010	Jagiellonia Białystok	10	(0)
2010	→ ŁKS Łódź (loan)	12	(0)
2011	KSZO Ostrowiec	16	(5)
2011–2014	Zawisza Bydgoszcz	84	(14)
Total		347	(47)

International career
2004	Poland	1	(0)
- * Club domestic league appearances and goals

Vahan Gevorgyan (Armenian: Վահան Գեվորգյան) is a former professional footballer who played as a midfielder. Born in Armenia, he represented the Poland national team.

== Club career ==
After his arrival in Poland, Gevorgyan began to play for Wisła Płock in 1999, and stayed with them until 2008.

In February 2011, he joined KSZO Ostrowiec.

In July 2011, he moved to Zawisza Bydgoszcz.

== International career ==
Gevorgyan appeared for Poland once, playing a total of one minute as a substitute against the United States. He was incorporated into Polish national youth games around Europe and the United States.

== Personal life ==
Gevorgyan's name is variously recorded as Vahan (or Wahan) Geworian, Geworgian, Gevorgian, Gevorian, Geworgyan or Gevorgyan. At the start of the 1999–2000 season, he was incorrectly recorded in Polish newspapers as Van Gevoryan. In his passport, his name is 'Vahan Gevorgyan'. He was stateless until 2003, when he was granted Polish citizenship.

== Career statistics ==
=== International ===
Appearances and goals by national team and year
National team	Year	Apps	Goals
Poland	2004	1	0
Total		1	0

== Honours ==
Wisła Płock

- Polish Cup: 2005–06
- Polish Super Cup: 2006

Jagiellonia Białystok

- Polish Cup: 2009–10

Zawisza Bydgoszcz

- I liga: 2012–13
- Polish Cup: 2013–14
- Polish Super Cup: 2014
