= Tomasz Brzyski =

Polish footballer (born 1982)

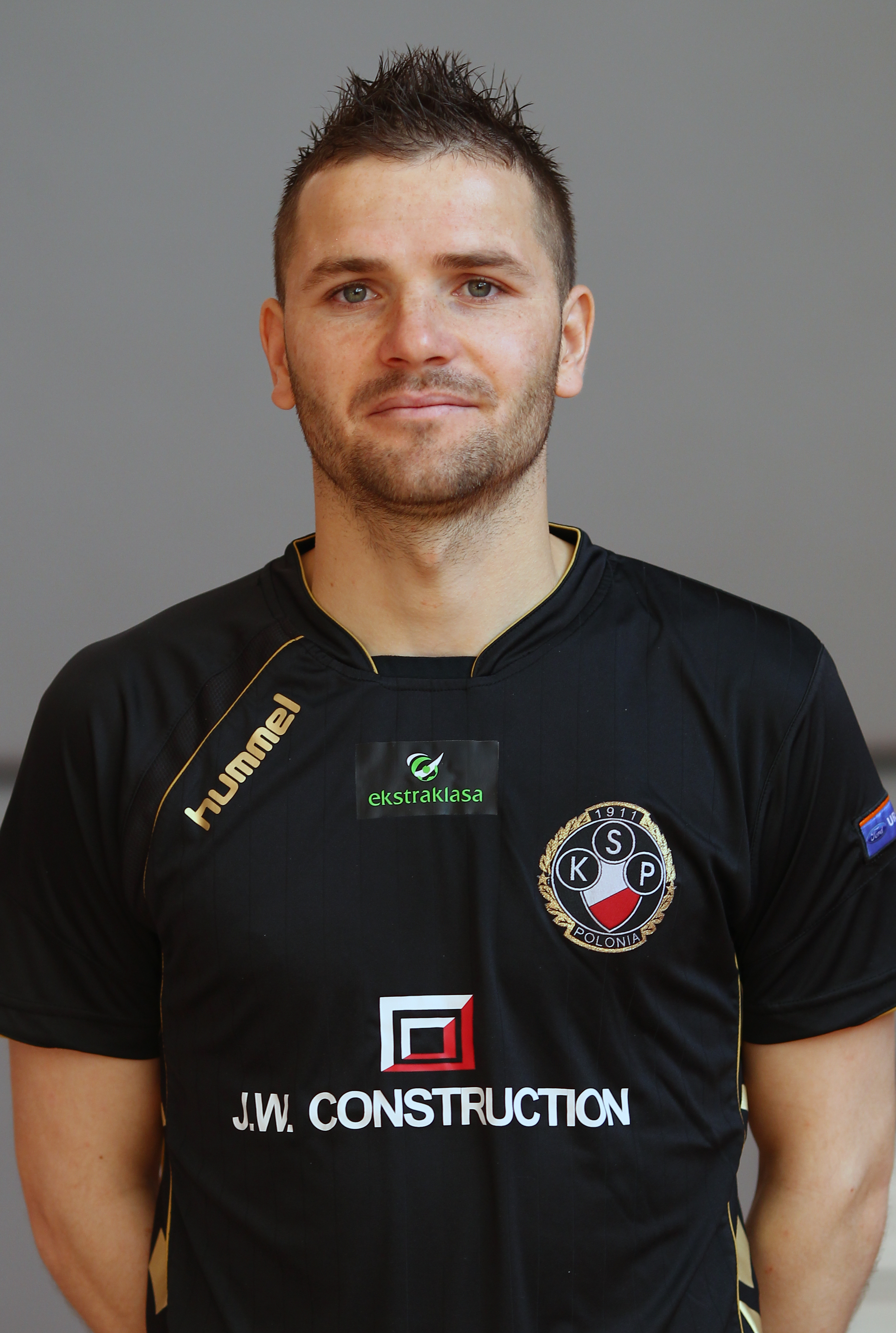
- Brzyski with Polonia Warsaw in 2011

Personal information
- Full name: Tomasz Brzyski
- Date of birth: 10 January 1982 (age 44)
- Place of birth: Lublin, Poland
- Height: 1.70 m (5 ft 7 in)
- Positions: Left-back; midfielder

Team information
- Current team: Cisowianka Drzewce
- Number: 17

Senior career*
Years	Team	Apps	(Gls)
1999–2002	Lublinianka		
2003–2004	Orlęta Radzyń Podlaski		
2004	→ Górnik Łęczna (loan)	2	(0)
2005–2006	Radomiak Radom	49	(2)
2006–2007	Korona Kielce	16	(0)
2008–2010	Ruch Chorzów	58	(5)
2010–2013	Polonia Warsaw	77	(6)
2013–2016	Legia Warsaw	93	(2)
2016–2017	Cracovia	22	(0)
2017–2018	Sandecja Nowy Sącz	29	(0)
2018–2019	Motor Lublin	46	(9)
2020	Lublinianka	0	(0)
2020–2021	Chełmianka Chełm	32	(10)
2021–2023	Lublinianka	53	(6)
2024–	Cisowianka Drzewce	54	(6)

International career
2010–2014	Poland	7	(1)
- * Club domestic league appearances and goals as of 17:11, 30 June 2026 (UTC)

Tomasz Brzyski (born 10 January 1982) is a Polish footballer who played as a left back or midfielder who plays for regional league club Cisowianka Drzewce.

== Career ==
On 14 January 2013, he terminated his contract with Polonia Warsaw by mutual agreement and on the same day joined Legia Warsaw.

On 29 June 2018, Brzyski signed a contract with III liga club Motor Lublin.

His final competitive appearance came on 17 June 2023, in the III liga match between KS Lublinianka and Stal Stalowa Wola. Prior to the start of the match, he received his club's shirt with his name on it, as well as a commemorative plaque. While leaving the pitch in the 67th minute of the match, he was given a farewell in a line made up by players of both teams.

He resumed playing on an amateur level in mid-2024, and was registered to play for sixth-tier club Cisowianka Drzewce.

== Career statistics ==
=== International ===
Appearances and goals by national team and year
National team	Year	Apps	Goals
Poland
Poland	2010	2	0
Poland	2013	2	0
Poland	2014	3	1
Total		7	1

Scores and results list Poland's goal tally first, score column indicates score after each Brzyski goal.

List of international goals scored by Tomasz Brzyski
No.	Date	Venue	Opponent	Score	Result	Competition
1	18 January 2014	Zayed Sports City Stadium, Abu Dhabi	Norway	1–0	3–0	Friendly

== Honours ==
Legia Warsaw

- Ekstraklasa: 2012–13, 2013–14, 2015–16, 2016–17
- Polish Cup: 2012–13, 2014–15, 2015–16

Motor Lublin

- Polish Cup (Lublin subdistrict regionals): 2018–19

Chełmianka Chełm

- Polish Cup (Chełm regionals): 2020–21

Lublinianka

- IV liga Lublin: 2021–22
