= Ronan (footballer, born 1994) =

Brazilian footballer

Personal information
- Full name: Ronan Queiroz de Paula Afonso
- Date of birth: 29 August 1994 (age 32)
- Place of birth: Vitória, Brazil
- Height: 1.77 m (5 ft 10 in)
- Position: Left-back

Youth career
- Fluminense

Senior career*
Years	Team	Apps	(Gls)
2013–2015	Fluminense	5	(0)
2014–2015	→ Legia Warsaw II (loan)	1	(0)
2015–2016	Porto B	1	(0)
2017	Tombense	0	(0)
2018	Nova Iguaçu	0	(0)
2019	Cabofriense		
2019	Santa Cruz-RN	5	(0)
2020	Cabofriense	0	(0)
2020	Gama	0	(0)
2021	Altos	3	(0)
- * Club domestic league appearances and goals

Ronan Queiroz de Paula Afonso (born 29 August 1994), commonly known as Ronan, is a Brazilian former professional footballer who played as a left-back.

== Club career ==
Ronan was born in Vitória. He is a youth product of Fluminense. He made his full debut at 15 August 2013 against Corinthians.

On 17 June 2014, he was loaned to Polish Ekstraklasa club Legia Warsaw.
