= Jakub Wójcicki =

Polish footballer (born 1988)

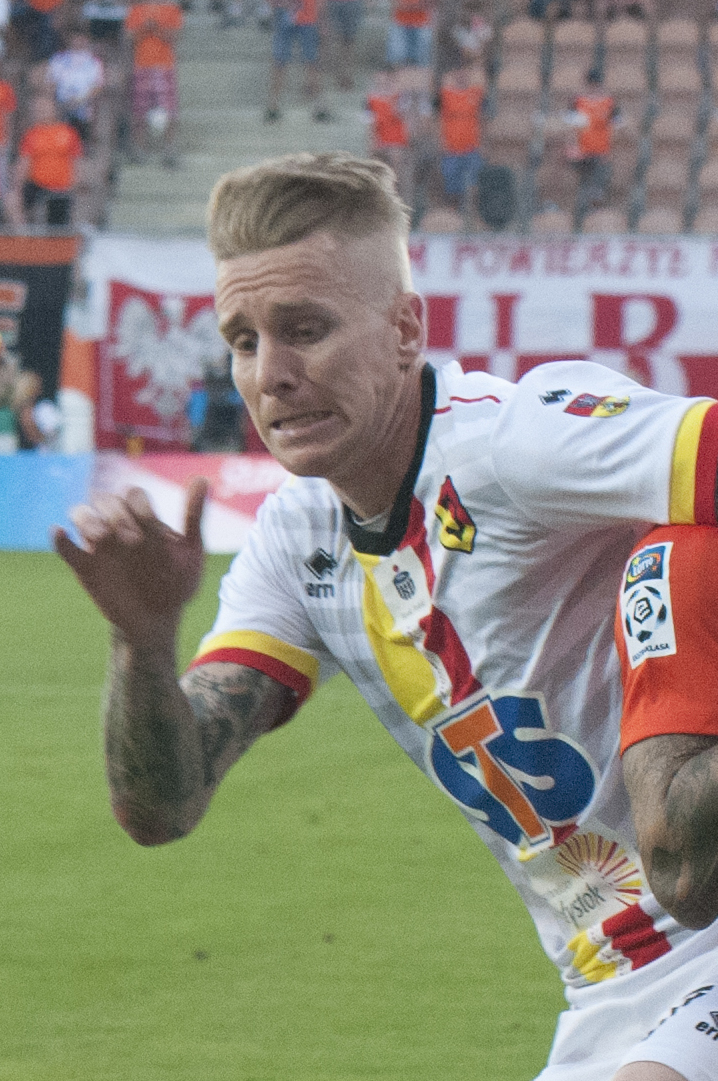
- Wójcicki with Jagiellonia Białystok in 2018

Personal information
- Date of birth: 9 July 1988 (age 38)
- Place of birth: Warsaw, Poland
- Height: 1.89 m (6 ft 2 in)
- Position: Right-back

Team information
- Current team: Weszło Warsaw
- Number: 7

Youth career
- 2005–2006: Znicz Pruszków
- 2006–2007: Anprel Nowa Wieś
- 2007–2008: Piast Piastów

Senior career*
Years	Team	Apps	(Gls)
2008–2010	GLKS Nadarzyn	56	(16)
2010–2015	Zawisza Bydgoszcz	155	(18)
2015–2017	Cracovia	80	(2)
2018–2020	Jagiellonia Białystok	58	(2)
2020–2022	Zagłębie Lubin	27	(0)
2022–2024	Znicz Pruszków	45	(3)
2024–	Weszło Warsaw	61	(6)
- * Club domestic league appearances and goals as of 21:38, 25 June 2026 (UTC)

Jakub Wójcicki (born 9 July 1988) is a Polish professional footballer who plays as a right-back for III liga club Weszło Warsaw.

== Career ==
On 20 July 2013, he made his Ekstraklasa debut coming on as substitute in a match against Cracovia.

On 11 January 2018, Wójcicki signed a two-and-a-half-year contract with Jagiellonia Białystok.

On 31 July 2020, he moved to Zagłębie Lubin.

On 21 October 2022, Wójcicki was registered to play in II liga for his childhood club Znicz Pruszków, where he was mainly used as a centre-forward.

On 16 July 2024, Wójcicki moved to IV liga Masovia club Weszło Warsaw.

== Honours ==
GLKS Nadarzyn

- III liga Łódź–Masovia: 2009–10

Zawisza Bydgoszcz

- I liga: 2012–13
- Polish Cup: 2013–14
- Polish Super Cup: 2014

Weszło Warsaw

- IV liga Masovia: 2025–26
