= Tomasz Jodłowiec =

Polish footballer (born 1985)

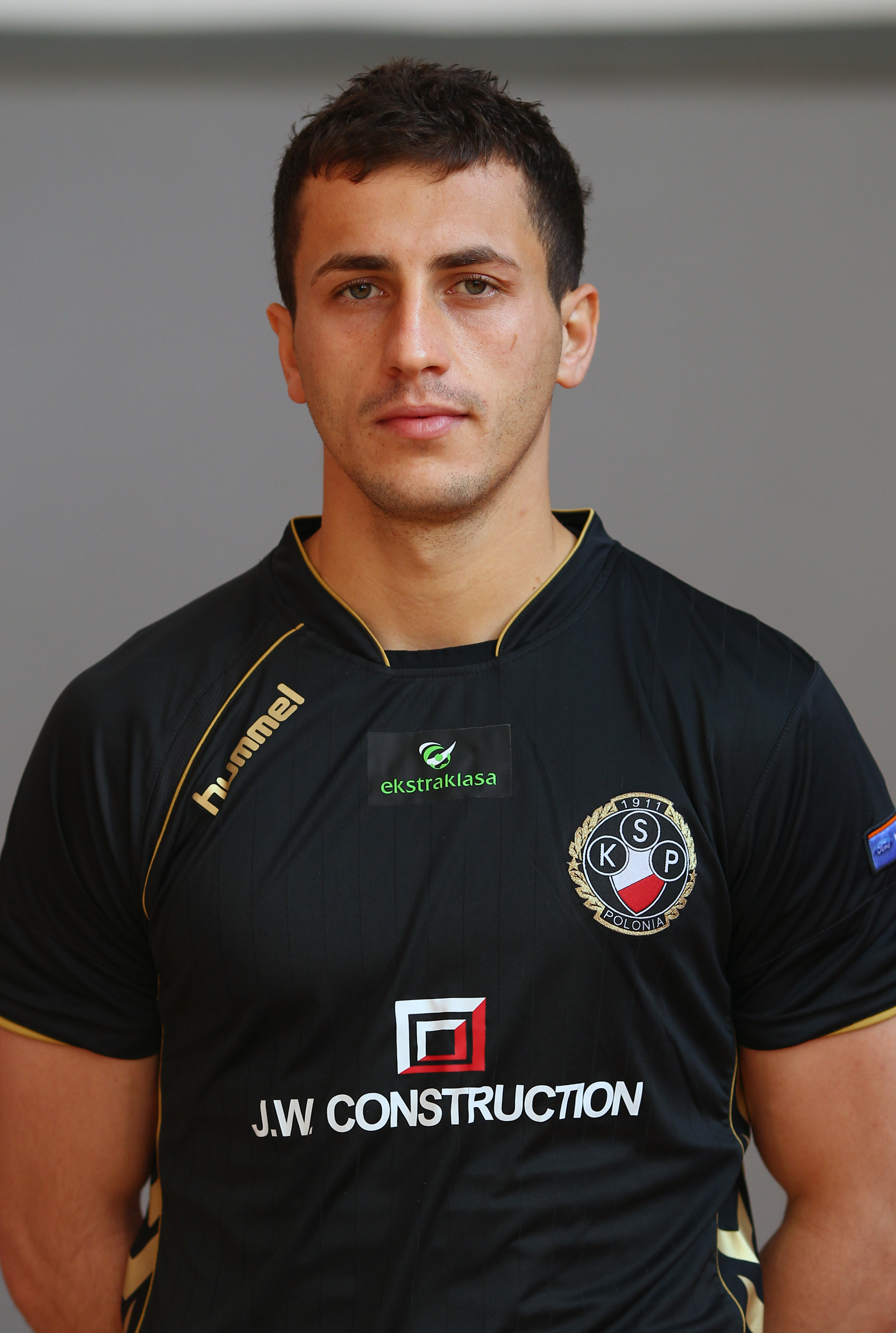
- Jodłowiec with Polonia Warsaw in 2011

Personal information
- Date of birth: 8 September 1985 (age 41)
- Place of birth: Żywiec, Poland
- Height: 1.90 m (6 ft 3 in)
- Position: Defensive midfielder

Team information
- Current team: Koszarawa Żywiec

Youth career
- Koszarawa Żywiec
- SMS Bielsko-Biała
- UKS SMS Łódź

Senior career*
Years	Team	Apps	(Gls)
2004	Widzew Łódź	4	(0)
2005	ŁKS Łódź	1	(0)
2006	Podbeskidzie Bielsko-Biała	13	(1)
2006–2008	Dyskobolia Grodzisk	43	(0)
2008–2012	Polonia Warsaw	99	(4)
2012	Śląsk Wrocław	15	(3)
2013–2019	Legia Warsaw	131	(15)
2018–2019	→ Piast Gliwice (loan)	40	(5)
2019	Legia Warsaw II	1	(0)
2019–2022	Piast Gliwice	54	(1)
2022–2024	Podbeskidzie Bielsko-Biała	38	(1)
2025	Sparta Kazimierza Wielka	13	(1)
2026	Halniak Maków Podhalański	4	(0)
2026–	Koszarawa Żywiec	0	(0)

International career
2008–2016	Poland	49	(1)
- * Club domestic league appearances and goals as of 16:24, 30 June 2026 (UTC)

Tomasz Jodłowiec (Polish pronunciation: [ˈtɔmaʂ jɔdˈwɔvjɛt͡s]; born 8 September 1985) is a Polish professional footballer who plays as a defensive midfielder for Klasa A club Koszarawa Żywiec.

== Club career ==
Jodłowiec was born in Żywiec. He debuted in the Ekstraklasa in July 2006 for Dyskobolia Grodzisk Wielkopolski. In 2008, he moved to the Polish capital after Dyskobolia merged with Polonia Warsaw. Jodłowiec was closely monitored by Serie A club Napoli FC in January 2009, but turned down a transfer for family reasons. On 19 February 2013, he signed a three-year contract with Legia Warsaw.

== International career ==
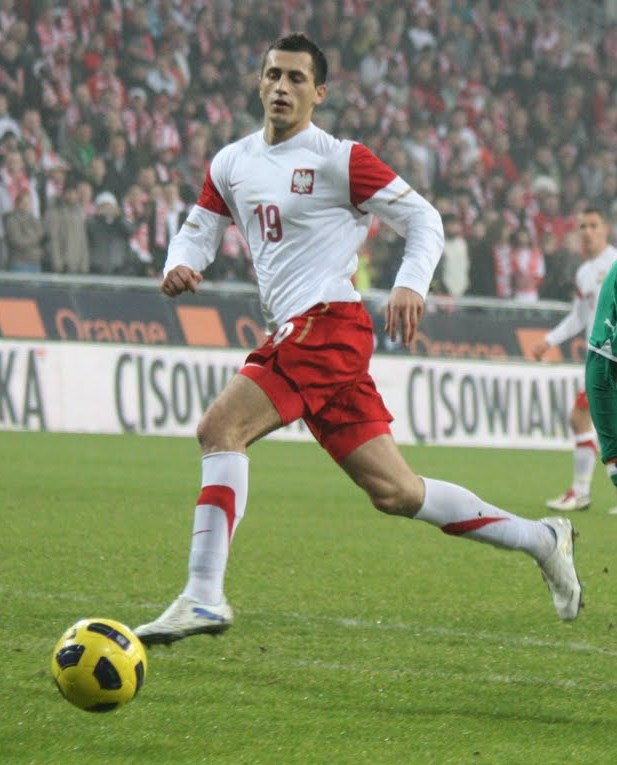
Jodłowiec for Poland in 2010

Jodłowiec debuted for the Poland national team on 11 October 2008, coming on as a substitute for Rafal Murawski during the 2010 World Cup qualifier against the Czech Republic. On 14 December he played his first entire match against Serbia. Jodłowiec scored an own goal during an international friendly with France on 9 June 2011.

He appeared at Euro 2016, playing in all of Poland's games, mostly as a substitute, coming on in late minutes to boost the team's defense.

== Career statistics ==
=== Club ===
As of match played 13 June 2026

Appearances and goals by club, season and competition
Club	Season	League			Polish Cup		Europe		Other		Total	
Club	Season	Division	Apps	Goals	Apps	Goals	Apps	Goals	Apps	Goals	Apps	Goals
Widzew Łódź	2004–05	II liga	4	0	1	0	—		—		5	0
ŁKS Łódź	2005–06	II liga	1	0	0	0	—		—		1	0
Podbeskidzie	2005–06	II liga	11	1	—		—		2 (Note: Appearances in II liga promotion/relegation play-offs)	0	13	1
Dyskobolia Grodzisk Wielkopolski	2006–07	Ekstraklasa	17	0	3	0	—		5 (Note: Appearances in Ekstraklasa Cup)	0	25	0
Dyskobolia Grodzisk Wielkopolski	2007–08	Ekstraklasa	26	0	6	0	6 (Note: Appearances in UEFA Cup/UEFA Europa League)	0	6	1	44	1
Dyskobolia Grodzisk Wielkopolski	Total		43	0	9	0	6	0	11	1	69	1
Polonia Warsaw	2008–09	Ekstraklasa	29	1	6	1	—		4	0	39	2
Polonia Warsaw	2009–10	Ekstraklasa	21	2	0	0	6	1	—		27	3
Polonia Warsaw	2010–11	Ekstraklasa	21	0	2	0	—		—		23	0
Polonia Warsaw	2011–12	Ekstraklasa	28	1	1	0	—		—		29	1
Polonia Warsaw	Total		99	4	9	1	6	1	4	0	118	6
Śląsk Wrocław	2012–13	Ekstraklasa	15	3	2	0	3 (Note: One appearance in UEFA Champions League, two appearances and one goal in UEFA Europa League)	1	1 (Note: Appearance in Polish Super Cup)	0	21	4
Legia Warsaw	2012–13	Ekstraklasa	7	1	6	0	—		—		13	1
Legia Warsaw	2013–14	Ekstraklasa	31	6	1	0	10 (Note: Four appearances in UEFA Champions League, six appearances and one goal in UEFA Europa League)	1	—		42	7
Legia Warsaw	2014–15	Ekstraklasa	31	3	7	2	14 (Note: Four appearances in UEFA Champions League, ten appearances in UEFA Europa League)	0	0	0	52	5
Legia Warsaw	2015–16	Ekstraklasa	27	4	3	0	10	0	1	0	41	4
Legia Warsaw	2016–17	Ekstraklasa	22	1	1	0	13 (Note: Eleven appearances in UEFA Champions League, two appearances in UEFA Europa League)	0	0	0	36	1
Legia Warsaw	2017–18	Ekstraklasa	9	0	2	0	1	0	0	0	12	0
Legia Warsaw	2019–20	Ekstraklasa	4	0	0	0	2	0	0	0	6	0
Legia Warsaw	Total		131	15	20	2	50	1	1	0	202	18
Piast Gliwice (loan)	2017–18	Ekstraklasa	15	1	—		—		—		15	1
Piast Gliwice (loan)	2018–19	Ekstraklasa	25	4	2	0	—		—		27	4
Piast Gliwice (loan)	Total		40	5	2	0	—		—		42	5
Legia Warsaw II	2019–20	III liga, group I	1	0	—		—		—		1	0
Piast Gliwice	2019–20	Ekstraklasa	22	1	3	0	—		—		25	1
Piast Gliwice	2020–21	Ekstraklasa	27	0	5	0	2	0	—		34	0
Piast Gliwice	2021–22	Ekstraklasa	5	0	1	0	—		—		6	0
Piast Gliwice	Total		54	1	9	0	2	0	—		65	1
Podbeskidzie	2022–23	I liga	18	1	0	0	—		—		18	1
Podbeskidzie	2023–24	I liga	20	0	2	0	—		—		22	0
Podbeskidzie	Total		38	1	2	0	—		—		40	1
Sparta Kazimierza Wielka	2024–25	IV liga Świętokrzyskie	13	1	—		—		—		13	1
Sparta Kazimierza Wielka	2025–26	III liga, group IV	0	0	—		—		—		0	0
Sparta Kazimierza Wielka	Total		13	1	—		—		—		13	1
Halniak Maków Podhalański	2025–26	Regional league	4	0	—		—		—		4	0
Koszarawa Żywiec	2026–27	Klasa A	0	0	—		—		—		0	0
Career total			454	31	54	3	67	3	19	1	594	38

=== International ===
Appearances and goals by national team and year
National team	Year	Apps	Goals
Poland	2008	3	0
Poland	2009	2	0
Poland	2010	9	0
Poland	2011	10	0
Poland	2012	2	0
Poland	2013	3	0
Poland	2014	6	0
Poland	2015	5	1
Poland	2016	9	0
Total		49	1

Scores and results list Poland's goal tally first, score column indicates score after each Jodłowiec goal.

List of international goals scored by Tomasz Jodłowiec
No.	Date	Venue	Opponent	Score	Result	Competition
1	17 November 2015	Stadion Miejski, Wrocław, Poland	Czech Republic	2–0	3–1	Friendly

== Honours ==
Dyskobolia Grodzisk Wielkopolski

- Polish Cup: 2006–07
- Ekstraklasa Cup: 2006–07, 2007–08

Śląsk Wrocław

- Polish Super Cup: 2012

Legia Warsaw

- Ekstraklasa: 2012–13, 2013–14, 2015–16, 2016–17, 2017–18, 2019–20
- Polish Cup: 2012–13, 2014–15, 2015–16, 2017–18

Piast Gliwice

- Ekstraklasa: 2018–19

Sparta Kazimierza Wielka

- IV liga Świętokrzyskie: 2024–25
