= Andrzej Witan =

Polish footballer

Personal information
- Full name: Andrzej Witan
- Date of birth: 22 February 1990 (age 36)
- Place of birth: Węgrów, Poland
- Height: 1.82 m (5 ft 11 1/2 in)
- Position: Goalkeeper

Team information
- Current team: Olimpia Elbląg

Youth career
- 2003: UKS "1" Węgrów
- 2004: KS Piaseczno
- 2005–2006: AON Rembertów
- 2007: Amica Wronki
- 2008–2009: Lech Poznań

Senior career*
Years	Team	Apps	(Gls)
2009–2015	Zawisza Bydgoszcz	114	(0)
2015	Pogoń Siedlce	10	(0)
2015–2016	Termalica Bruk-Bet	5	(0)
2016–2017	Wisła Puławy	19	(0)
2017–2019	Bytovia Bytów	45	(1)
2019–2020	Chojniczanka Chojnice	8	(0)
2020	Arka Gdynia	0	(0)
2021–2025	Olimpia Elbląg	117	(0)
2025–2026	PAP Osielsko	27	(0)
2026–	Olimpia Elbląg	0	(0)
- * Club domestic league appearances and goals as of 19:55, 5 July 2026 (UTC)

Andrzej Witan (born 22 February 1990) is a Polish professional footballer who plays as a goalkeeper for III liga club Olimpia Elbląg.

== Club career ==
On 18 May 2019, he scored a winning goal for Bytovia Bytów in 7th added minute of the last game of the season against GKS Katowice. However, Wigry Suwałki, who were fighting Bytovia and GKS for the one remaining non-relegation spot, also scored a winning goal in added time in their game, and Bytovia was relegated to the third-tier II liga anyway, as was GKS Katowice, and Wigry stayed in the league.

On 11 August 2020, he joined Arka Gdynia on a two-year contract.

== Honours ==
Zawisza Bydgoszcz

- I liga: 2012–13
- Polish Cup: 2013–14
