= Mateusz Żyro =

Polish footballer

Personal information
- Full name: Mateusz Żyro
- Date of birth: 28 October 1998 (age 28)
- Place of birth: Warsaw, Poland
- Height: 1.88 m (6 ft 2 in)
- Position: Centre-back

Team information
- Current team: Widzew Łódź
- Number: 5

Youth career
- 2005–2015: Legia Warsaw

Senior career*
Years	Team	Apps	(Gls)
2015–2018	Legia Warsaw II	33	(0)
2017–2020	Legia Warsaw	3	(0)
2018	→ Wigry Suwałki (loan)	15	(0)
2018–2019	→ Miedź Legnica (loan)	6	(0)
2019–2020	→ Stal Mielec (loan)	29	(1)
2020–2022	Stal Mielec	52	(2)
2022–	Widzew Łódź	118	(4)

International career
2016	Poland U18	4	(0)
2016–2017	Poland U19	9	(0)
2018	Poland U20	1	(0)
- * Club domestic league appearances and goals as of 17:08, 28 May 2026 (UTC)

Mateusz Żyro (born 28 October 1998) is a Polish professional footballer who plays as centre-back for Ekstraklasa club Widzew Łódź.

== Career ==
=== Legia Warsaw ===
On 7 July 2017, Żyro made his professional debut in Polish Super Cup against Arka Gdynia. Żyro was loaned out to Wigry Suwałki from February 2018 to the end of the season, and later Miedź Legnica for the 2018–19 season. He was loaned out again for the 2019–20 season, this time to Stal Mielec.

=== Stal Mielec ===
On 5 August 2020, he moved to Stal Mielec on a permanent basis and signed a two-year contract.

=== Widzew Łódź ===
On 9 June 2022, Żyro joined the newly promoted side Widzew Łódź on a two-year deal with a one-year extension option.

== Personal life ==
His older brother Michał, born in 1992, was also a professional footballer who earned four caps for the Poland national team in 2014.

== Honours ==
Stal Mielec

- I liga: 2019–20
