= Adam Ryczkowski =

Polish footballer

Personal information
- Date of birth: 30 April 1997 (age 29)
- Place of birth: Węgrów, Poland
- Height: 1.78 m (5 ft 10 in)
- Position: Winger

Team information
- Current team: Legia Warsaw II
- Number: 11

Youth career
- Miedzanka Miedzna
- 2010–2013: Polonia Warsaw
- 2013–2014: Legia Warsaw

Senior career*
Years	Team	Apps	(Gls)
2014–2016	Legia Warsaw II	34	(6)
2014–2018	Legia Warsaw	9	(2)
2017	→ Wigry Suwałki (loan)	10	(0)
2017–2018	→ Chojniczanka Chojnice (loan)	30	(8)
2018–2021	Górnik Zabrze	12	(0)
2018–2020	Górnik Zabrze II	3	(1)
2021	Chojniczanka Chojnice	18	(7)
2021–2022	Motor Lublin	35	(1)
2022–2023	Chojniczanka Chojnice	28	(1)
2023–	Legia Warsaw II	77	(43)

International career
2012	Poland U15	4	(1)
2013	Poland U16	11	(4)
2013–2014	Poland U17	10	(4)
2014	Poland U18	1	(0)
2014–2015	Poland U19	8	(2)
2017–2018	Poland U20	7	(0)
- * Club domestic league appearances and goals as of 21:51, 1 June 2026 (UTC)

Adam Ryczkowski (born 30 April 1997) is a Polish professional footballer who plays as a winger for II liga club Legia Warsaw II.

== Club career ==
Ryczkowski started his career with Legia Warsaw.

== Honours ==
Legia Warsaw

- Ekstraklasa: 2015–16
- Polish Cup: 2015–16

Legia Warsaw II

- III liga, group I: 2025–26
- Polish Cup (Masovia regionals): 2024–25
