= Robert Bartczak =

Polish football midfielder

Personal information
- Full name: Robert Bartczak
- Date of birth: 12 March 1996 (age 30)
- Place of birth: Włocławek, Poland
- Height: 1.78 m (5 ft 10 in)
- Position: Left winger

Team information
- Current team: SV Weidenstetten
- Number: 18

Youth career
- 2006–2012: Lider Włocławek
- 2012–2013: Legia Warsaw

Senior career*
Years	Team	Apps	(Gls)
2013–2018	Legia Warsaw II	86	(16)
2014–2018	Legia Warsaw	1	(0)
2016–2017	→ Zagłębie Sosnowiec (loan)	46	(4)
2018–2022	Wigry Suwałki	79	(10)
2022–2024	FC Blaubeuren	48	(10)
2024	SV Weidenstetten	12	(4)
2024	FC Burlafingen	12	(5)
2025–	SV Weidenstetten	12	(1)

International career
2012	Poland U16	4	(1)
2012–2013	Poland U17	10	(3)
2013–2014	Poland U18	7	(3)
2013–2014	Poland U19	4	(0)
2016–2017	Poland U20	8	(0)
- * Club domestic league appearances and goals as of 10:53, 1 March 2026 (UTC)

Robert Bartczak (born 12 March 1996) is a Polish footballer who plays as a midfielder for German club FSV Weidenstetten.
