= Bartłomiej Kalinkowski =

Polish footballer (born 1994)

Personal information
- Full name: Bartłomiej Kalinkowski
- Date of birth: 11 July 1994 (age 32)
- Place of birth: Warsaw, Poland
- Height: 1.82 m (6 ft 0 in)
- Position: Central midfielder

Team information
- Current team: Legionovia Legionowo

Youth career
- 2001–2003: Junior Radom
- 2003–2006: PKS Makowiec
- 2006–2011: Broń Radom
- 2011–2013: Legia Warsaw

Senior career*
| Years | Team | Apps | (Gls) |
| 2013–2016 | Legia Warsaw II | 54 | (4) |
| 2014–2016 | Legia Warsaw | 3 | (0) |
| 2015–2016 | → Wigry Suwałki (loan) | 31 | (3) |
| 2016–2018 | GKS Katowice | 54 | (1) |
| 2018–2020 | ŁKS Łódź | 37 | (1) |
| 2020–2022 | Górnik Łęczna | 56 | (2) |
| 2022–2023 | Chojniczanka Chojnice | 28 | (0) |
| 2023–2025 | Weszło Warsaw | 53 | (2) |
| 2025–2026 | Hutnik Warsaw | 32 | (4) |
| 2026– | Legionovia Legionowo | 0 | (0) |

International career
| 2014 | Poland U20 | 2 | (0) |
- * Club domestic league appearances and goals as of 10:07, 15 June 2026 (UTC)

Bartłomiej Kalinkowski (born 11 July 1994) is a Polish professional footballer who plays as a midfielder for IV liga Masovia club Hutnik Warsaw. He started his senior career with Legia Warsaw.

== Honours ==
Górnik Łęczna

- II liga: 2019–20

Weszło Warsaw

- Polish Cup (Warsaw regionals): 2023–24
