= Łukasz Budziłek =

Polish footballer (born 1991)

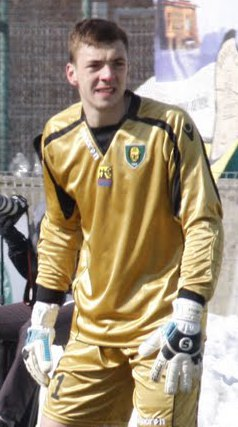
- Budziłek with GKS Katowice in 2013

Personal information
- Date of birth: 19 March 1991 (age 35)
- Place of birth: Bełchatów, Poland
- Height: 1.86 m (6 ft 1 in)
- Position: Goalkeeper

Youth career
- –2010: GKS Bełchatów

Senior career*
Years	Team	Apps	(Gls)
2010–2013	GKS Bełchatów	3	(0)
2013–2014	GKS Katowice	44	(0)
2014–2015	Legia Warsaw	0	(0)
2014–2015	Legia Warsaw II	7	(0)
2015–2018	Lechia Gdańsk	9	(0)
2015–2016	Lechia Gdańsk II	14	(0)
2016–2017	→ Chojniczanka Chojnice (loan)	25	(0)
2017	→ Wigry Suwałki (loan)	12	(0)
2018–2019	Pogoń Szczecin	2	(0)
2018	Pogoń Szczecin II	5	(0)
2019	→ Bruk-Bet Termalica (loan)	13	(0)
2019–2022	Bruk-Bet Termalica	21	(0)
2022–2025	Motor Lublin	41	(0)
2025–2026	Górnik Łęczna	15	(0)
- * Club domestic league appearances and goals as of 15:53, 26 May 2026 (UTC)

Łukasz Budziłek (born 19 March 1991) is a Polish professional footballer who plays as a goalkeeper.
