= GLKS Nadarzyn =

Polish football club

- Full name: Gminny Ludowy Klub Sportowy Orzeł Nadarzyn
- Founded: 1952; 73 years ago
- Ground: Stadion GOS
- Capacity: 832
- Chairman: Damian Krzemiński
- Manager: Łukasz Majkowski & Adrian Zabłocki
- League: Klasa A Warsaw
- 2024–25: 6th of 14
- Website: GLKS Orzeł Nadarzyn on Facebook
| Home colours | Away colours |

GLKS Orzeł Nadarzyn is a Polish football club located in Nadarzyn, Poland. It currently plays in the Klasa A. The team's colors are yellow and blue.

== Honours ==
- II liga
  - 14th place: 2010–11

== Current squad ==
- Current squad
