= Konrad Jałocha =

Polish footballer

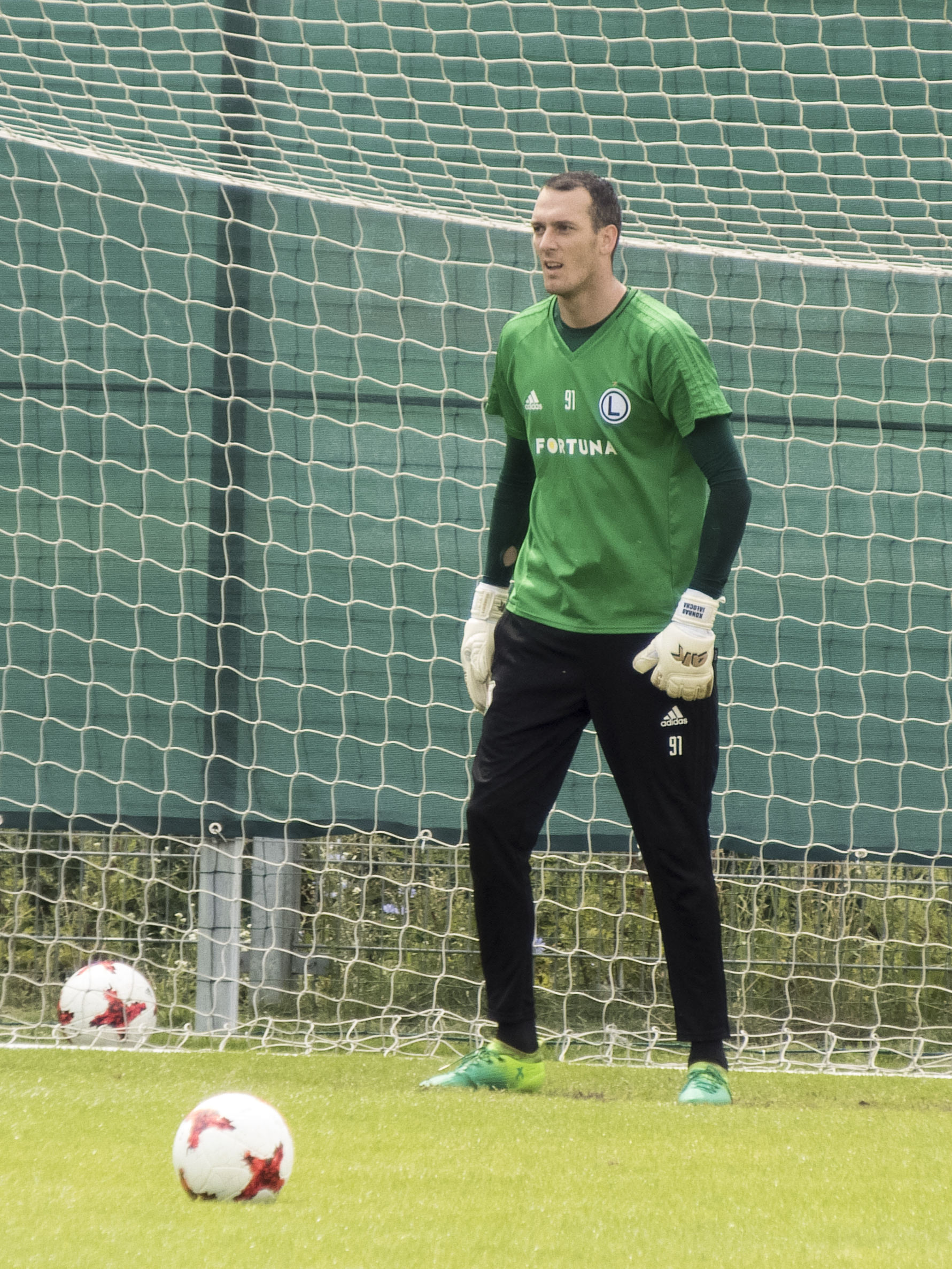
- Jałocha with Legia Warsaw in 2017

Personal information
- Full name: Konrad Jałocha
- Date of birth: 9 May 1991 (age 35)
- Place of birth: Warsaw, Poland
- Height: 2.01 m (6 ft 7 in)
- Position: Goalkeeper

Team information
- Current team: ŁKS Łomża

Youth career
- 2004–2005: KS Puznówka 1996
- 2005–2007: Mazowsze Miętne
- 2007–2012: Legia Warsaw

Senior career*
Years	Team	Apps	(Gls)
2012–2018	Legia Warsaw	4	(0)
2013	→ Chojniczanka Chojnice (loan)	22	(0)
2014–2017	Legia Warsaw II	20	(0)
2015–2017	→ Arka Gdynia (loan)	61	(0)
2018	→ GKS Tychy (loan)	15	(0)
2018–2023	GKS Tychy	154	(0)
2023–2026	Stal Mielec	5	(0)
2026–	ŁKS Łomża	0	(0)
- * Club domestic league appearances and goals as of 20:51, 26 May 2026 (UTC)

Konrad Jałocha (born 9 May 1991) is a Polish professional footballer who plays as a goalkeeper for III liga club ŁKS Łomża.

== Honours ==
Legia Warsaw

- Ekstraklasa: 2013–14

Arka Gdynia

- I liga: 2015–16
