= List of Polish football transfers summer 2018 =

This is a list of Polish football transfers in the 2018 summer transfer window by club. Only clubs in the 2018–19 Ekstraklasa are included.

== Ekstraklasa ==
=== Arka Gdynia ===
In:

No.	Pos.	Nation	Player
3	DF	COD	Christian Maghoma (From (England) Tottenham Hotspur U-23)
9	MF	MAR	Nabil Aankour (From Korona Kielce)
18	MF	POL	Karol Danielak (From Chrobry Głogów)
19	MF	POL	Adrian Klimczak (Return from Olimpia Grudziądz)
20	MF	SLO	Goran Cvijanović (From Korona Kielce)
22	MF	POL	Michał Janota (From Stal Mielec)
23	DF	CRO	Luka Marić (From (Romania) Dinamo București)
44	DF	POL	Robert Sulewski (From Zagłębie Sosnowiec)
92	FW	BUL	Aleksandar Kolev (From Sandecja Nowy Sącz)
97	GK	POL	Marcin Staniszewski (From Puszcza Niepołomice)

Out:

No.	Pos.	Nation	Player
3	DF	POL	Krzysztof Sobieraj (To Ogniwo Sopot)
6	MF	POL	Antoni Łukasiewicz
9	FW	ESP	Rubén Jurado (To (Cyprus) AEL Limassol)
10	MF	POL	Mateusz Szwoch (Return to Legia Warsaw)
13	MF	POL	Grzegorz Piesio (To GKS Katowice)
16	FW	MEX	Enrique Esqueda (to (India) East Bengal)
18	MF	POL	Krzysztof Janus (To Odra Opole)
20	MF	BLR	Sergey Krivets (To (Belarus) Dynamo Brest)
21	MF	GER	Yannick Kakoko (To (Luxembourg) F91 Dudelange)
23	DF	POL	Marcin Warcholak (To Wisła Płock)
24	MF	POL	Patryk Kun (Return to Rozwój Katowice)
25	MF	POL	Paweł Wojowski (To ŁKS Łódź, previously on loan at Gryf Wejherowo)
27	DF	GRE	Achilleas Poungouras (Return to (Greece) PAOK)
29	DF	POL	Michał Marcjanik (To (Italy) Empoli)
32	DF	POL	Przemysław Stolc (To Chrobry Głogów, previously on loan)
80	GK	POL	Krzysztof Pilarz (To Olimpia Elbląg)
—	DF	POL	Oskar Repka (Loan to Chrobry Głogów, previously transfer from (Germany) Karlsruher SC U-19)

=== Cracovia ===
In:

No.	Pos.	Nation	Player
2	DF	ROU	Cornel Râpă (From Pogoń Szczecin)
9	FW	ESP	Gerard Oliva (From (Spain) UCAM Murcia)
18	FW	POL	Mateusz Szczepaniak (Return from Piast Gliwice)
21	MF	POL	Jakub Serafin (From Lech Poznań)
23	MF	POL	Adrian Danek (From Sandecja Nowy Sącz)
26	FW	POL	Filip Piszczek (From Sandecja Nowy Sącz)
27	MF	POL	Marcin Budziński (From (Australia) Melbourne City)
70	MF	POL	Mateusz Cetnarski (Return from Sandecja Nowy Sącz)
88	GK	POL	Maciej Gostomski (From Korona Kielce)
—	FW	RUS	Serder Serderov (From (Russia) Yenisey Krasnoyarsk)

Out:

No.	Pos.	Nation	Player
2	DF	SLO	Matic Fink (Return to (Turkey) Rizespor)
44	FW	DEN	Nicolai Brock-Madsen (Return to (England) Birmingham City)
71	MF	BUL	Anton Karachanakov
92	FW	LAT	Deniss Rakels (Return to (England) Reading)
99	FW	POL	Krzysztof Piątek (To (Italy) Genoa)
99	MF	ESP	Elady (To (Spain) Cartagena, previously transfer from (Spain) Real Murcia)

=== Górnik Zabrze ===
In:

No.	Pos.	Nation	Player
6	MF	POL	Wiktor Biedrzycki (From Stomil Olsztyn)
9	FW	ESP	Jesús Jiménez (From (Spain) Talavera)
45	FW	POL	Adam Ryczkowski (From Legia Warsaw)
—	MF	POL	Filip Żagiel (Return from Odra Opole)

Out:

No.	Pos.	Nation	Player
4	DF	POL	Mateusz Wieteska (To Legia Warsaw)
5	DF	UKR	Oleksandr Shevelyukhin
7	MF	POL	Rafał Kurzawa (To (France) Amiens)
9	MF	POL	Damian Kądzior (To (Croatia) Dinamo Zagreb)
10	MF	SVK	Erik Grendel (To (Slovakia) Spartak Trnava)
11	FW	CZE	David Ledecký (To (Czech Republic) Dynamo České Budějovice, previously on loan at Odra Opole)
21	MF	SLO	Sandi Arčon
96	GK	POL	Mateusz Kuchta (To Zagłębie Lubin, previously on loan at Odra Opole)
99	GK	POL	Grzegorz Kasprzik

=== Jagiellonia Białystok ===
In:

No.	Pos.	Nation	Player
4	DF	POL	Lukas Klemenz (From GKS Katowice)
13	MF	SRB	Mile Savković (From (Serbia) Spartak Subotica)
29	GK	POL	Grzegorz Sandomierski
66	GK	POL	Jakub Miszczuk (From Stomil Olsztyn)
89	MF	POL	Mateusz Machaj (From Chrobry Głogów)
98	FW	POL	Patryk Klimala (Return from Wigry Suwałki)

Out:

No.	Pos.	Nation	Player
3	DF	POL	Jonatan Straus (Loan to Wigry Suwałki, previously on loan at Sandecja Nowy Sącz)
14	DF	POL	Marek Wasiluk (To Chrobry Głogów)
16	DF	BRA	Gutieri Tomelin (To (Croatia) NK Osijek)
46	GK	POL	Hubert Gostomski (Loan to Bruk-Bet Termalica Nieciecza)
66	GK	GEO	Luka Gugeshashvili (Loan to (Georgia (country)) Dila Gori)
81	GK	POL	Mariusz Pawełek (To GKS Katowice)
95	DF	POL	Dawid Szymonowicz (Loan to Bruk-Bet Termalica Nieciecza)
—	MF	SVK	Martin Adamec (Loan to Wigry Suwałki, previously transfer from (Austria) SKN St. Pölten)
—	DF	POL	Rafał Augustyniak (To Miedź Legnica, previously on loan)
—	FW	POL	Maciej Górski (To Korona Kielce, previously on loan at Chojniczanka Chojnice)
—	MF	POL	Przemysław Mystkowski (Loan to Podbeskidzie Bielsko-Biała, previously on loan at Miedź Legnica)

=== Korona Kielce ===
In:

No.	Pos.	Nation	Player
9	FW	POL	Maciej Górski (From Jagiellonia Białystok)
17	MF	POL	Maciej Firlej (From Ślęza Wrocław)
24	MF	GEO	Vato Arveladze (From (Georgia (country)) Locomotive Tbilisi)
37	DF	POL	Kornel Kordas (From Stal Rzeszów)
77	MF	POL	Oktawian Skrzecz (From GKS Katowice)
88	GK	POL	Paweł Sokół (From (England) Manchester City U-21)
91	MF	CRC	Felicio Brown Forbes (From (Russia) Amkar Perm)
—	DF	ESP	Iván Márquez (From (Spain) Valencia B)
—	MF	SLO	Matej Pučko (From (Spain) Oviedo)

Out:

No.	Pos.	Nation	Player
1	GK	POL	Maciej Gostomski (To Cracovia)
2	DF	POL	Krystian Miś (To Wisła Płock)
6	MF	SLO	Goran Cvijanović (To Arka Gdynia)
9	FW	GEO	Nika Kacharava (Return to (Russia) Rostov)
10	MF	MAR	Nabil Aankour (To Arka Gdynia)
17	FW	BIH	Sanel Kapidžić (To (Norway) Sandnes Ulf)
27	MF	POL	Jacek Kiełb (To Bruk-Bet Termalica Nieciecza)
32	DF	CZE	Radek Dejmek (To (Cyprus) Pafos)
33	GK	SRB	Zlatan Alomerović (To Lechia Gdańsk)
44	DF	HUN	Ákos Kecskés (Return to (Italy) Atalanta)
—	FW	GER	Amer Halilić (Previously on loan at (Bosnia and Herzegovina) NK Vitez)
—	MF	POL	Mariusz Rybicki (To Odra Opole, previously on loan at Wigry Suwałki)

=== Lech Poznań ===
In:

No.	Pos.	Nation	Player
8	FW	POL	Paweł Tomczyk (Return from Podbeskidzie Bielsko-Biała)
11	FW	ESP	Dioni Villalba (From (Spain) Fuenlabrada)
19	MF	POL	Tomasz Cywka (From Wisła Kraków)
24	MF	POR	João Amaral (From (Portugal) Benfica)
25	MF	POR	Pedro Tiba (From (Portugal) G.D. Chaves)
33	GK	POL	Karol Szymański (From Polonia Środa Wielkopolska)
—	DF	POL	Marcin Wasielewski (Return from Znicz Pruszków)

Out:

No.	Pos.	Nation	Player
8	MF	POL	Szymon Pawłowski (To Zagłębie Sosnowiec, previously on loan at Bruk-Bet Termalica Nieciecza)
11	FW	UKR	Oleksiy Khoblenko (Return to (Ukraine) Chornomorets Odesa)
14	FW	BIH	Elvir Koljić (Return to (Bosnia and Herzegovina) FK Krupa)
15	MF	POL	Jakub Moder (Loan to Odra Opole)
16	MF	CRO	Mario Šitum (Return to (Croatia) Dinamo Zagreb)
20	MF	POL	Dariusz Formella (To Raków Częstochowa, previously on loan)
21	MF	POL	Jakub Serafin (To Cracovia)
23	MF	SWE	Nicklas Bärkroth (To (Sweden) Djurgårdens IF)
31	GK	POL	Bartosz Mrozek (Loan to Elana Toruń)
36	GK	POL	Mateusz Lis (To Wisła Kraków, previously on loan at Raków Częstochowa)
66	DF	AUT	Emir Dilaver (To (Croatia) Dinamo Zagreb)
86	MF	POL	Radosław Majewski (To Pogoń Szczecin)

=== Lechia Gdańsk ===
In:

No.	Pos.	Nation	Player
1	GK	SRB	Zlatan Alomerović (From Korona Kielce)
6	MF	POL	Jarosław Kubicki (From Zagłębie Lubin)
8	MF	POL	Michał Mak (Return from Śląsk Wrocław)
10	FW	IDN	Egy Maulana (From (Indonesia) Diklat Ragunan)
11	MF	POL	Konrad Michalak (From Legia Warsaw)
18	FW	POL	Jakub Arak (Return from Stal Mielec)
19	MF	POL	Karol Fila (Return from Chojniczanka Chojnice)
20	MF	POL	Daniel Mikołajewski (Return from Stomil Olsztyn)
33	DF	POL	Mateusz Lewandowski (Return from Śląsk Wrocław)
36	MF	POL	Tomasz Makowski (Return from Górnik Łęczna)
90	FW	POL	Artur Sobiech (From (Germany) Darmstadt 98)

Out:

No.	Pos.	Nation	Player
2	DF	CRO	Mato Miloš (Return to (Portugal) Benfica)
3	DF	POL	Jakub Wawrzyniak (To GKS Katowice)
6	MF	BUL	Simeon Slavchev (Return to (Portugal) Sporting CP)
10	MF	POL	Sebastian Mila
11	FW	POL	Grzegorz Kuświk
19	FW	POR	Marco Paixão (To (Turkey) Altay)
33	GK	CRO	Oliver Zelenika
38	MF	BUL	Milen Gamakov (To (Bulgaria) Slavia Sofia)
41	DF	POL	Paweł Stolarski (To Legia Warsaw)
77	DF	POL	Rafał Kobryń (Loan to Chojniczanka Chojnice)
96	MF	SUI	João Oliveira (Return to (Switzerland) FC Luzern)

=== Legia Warsaw ===
In:

No.	Pos.	Nation	Player
4	DF	POL	Mateusz Wieteska (From Górnik Zabrze)
5	DF	POL	Mateusz Hołownia (Return from Ruch Chorzów)
19	FW	GUI	José Kanté (From Wisła Płock)
21	MF	HUN	Dominik Nagy (Return from (Hungary) Ferencváros)
23	DF	POL	Mateusz Żyro (Return from Wigry Suwałki)
24	DF	POL	Tomasz Nawotka (Return from Zagłębie Sosnowiec)
27	FW	ESP	Carlitos (From Wisła Kraków)
30	GK	POL	Radosław Majecki (Return from Stal Mielec)
41	DF	POL	Paweł Stolarski (From Lechia Gdańsk)
99	FW	CRO	Sandro Kulenović (Return from (Italy) Juventus Primavera)

Out:

No.	Pos.	Nation	Player
3	DF	BRA	Maurício (Return to (Italy) Lazio)
4	DF	POL	Jakub Czerwiński (To Piast Gliwice, previously on loan)
7	MF	POR	Hildeberto Pereira (To (Portugal) Vitória Setúbal, previously on loan at (England) Northampton Town)
15	MF	POL	Michał Kopczyński (Loan to (New Zealand) Wellington Phoenix)
19	MF	POL	Rafał Makowski (To Zagłębie Sosnowiec, previously on loan)
20	MF	POL	Mateusz Szwoch (To Wisła Płock, previously on loan at Arka Gdynia)
28	DF	POL	Łukasz Broź (To Śląsk Wrocław)
40	MF	USA	Brian Iloski (Loan to (Slovakia) Zemplín Michalovce)
77	MF	POL	Konrad Michalak (To Lechia Gdańsk, previously on loan at Wisła Płock)
—	FW	POL	Adam Ryczkowski (To Górnik Zabrze, previously on loan at Chojniczanka Chojnice)
—	MF	POL	Robert Bartczak (To Wigry Suwałki)

=== Miedź Legnica ===
In:

No.	Pos.	Nation	Player
6	DF	POL	Rafał Augustyniak (From Jagiellonia Białystok, previously on loan)
17	DF	EST	Artur Pikk (From (Slovakia) Ružomberok)
21	MF	EST	Henrik Ojamaa (From (Croatia) Gorica)
26	DF	ESP	Fran Cruz (From (Spain) Lorca)
32	GK	UKR	Anton Kanibolotskiy (From (Azerbaijan) Qarabağ)
—	MF	ESP	Juan Cámara (From (Spain) Barcelona B)
—	MF	ESP	Borja Fernández (From (Spain) Celta Vigo)

Out:

No.	Pos.	Nation	Player
10	MF	POL	Michał Bartkowiak
21	MF	POL	Przemysław Mystkowski (Return to Jagiellonia Białystok)
25	MF	POL	Karol Gardzielewicz (Loan to Chojniczanka Chojnice)
26	DF	BRA	Deleu (To Chojniczanka Chojnice)
33	GK	POL	Paweł Kapsa (To Sandecja Nowy Sącz)
95	GK	POL	Piotr Smołuch (To Pogoń Siedlce)

=== Piast Gliwice ===
In:

No.	Pos.	Nation	Player
4	DF	POL	Jakub Czerwiński (From Legia Warsaw, previously on loan)
9	FW	POL	Piotr Parzyszek (From (Netherlands) Zwolle)
11	MF	ESP	Jorge Félix (From (Spain) Lleida Esportiu)
18	MF	POL	Patryk Sokołowski (From Wigry Suwałki)
22	DF	POL	Tomasz Mokwa (From GKS Katowice)

Out:

No.	Pos.	Nation	Player
10	FW	POL	Karol Angielski (To Wisła Płock)
12	MF	SLO	Saša Živec (To (Cyprus) Omonia)
15	DF	POL	Adam Mójta (To Pogoń Siedlce)
77	MF	POL	Igor Sapała (To Raków Częstochowa, previously on loan)
24	DF	CRO	Dario Rugašević
44	FW	POL	Mateusz Szczepaniak (Return to Cracovia)
82	MF	SVK	Martin Bukata (To (Italy) Benevento Calcio)
93	DF	LTU	Edvinas Girdvainis (Previously on loan at (Russia) Tom Tomsk)
—	DF	POL	Bartosz Waleńcik (Loan to Górnik Łęczna, previously on loan at Legionovia Legionowo)

=== Pogoń Szczecin ===
In:

No.	Pos.	Nation	Player
10	MF	POL	Radosław Majewski (From Lech Poznań)
11	FW	GER	Soufian Benyamina (From (Germany) Hansa Rostock)
17	MF	BIH	Zvonimir Kožulj (From (Croatia) Hajduk Split)
18	FW	POL	Adam Buksa (From Zagłębie Lubin, previously on loan)
22	DF	AUT	David Stec (From (Austria) SKN St. Pölten)
33	DF	POL	Mariusz Malec (From Podbeskidzie Bielsko-Biała)
34	MF	ESP	Iker Guarrotxena (From (Spain) Cultural Leonesa)

Out:

No.	Pos.	Nation	Player
2	DF	ROU	Cornel Râpă (To Cracovia)
4	MF	POL	Jakub Piotrowski (To (Belgium) Genk)
6	MF	POL	Rafał Murawski
7	MF	HUN	Ádám Gyurcsó (To (Croatia) Hajduk Split, previously on loan)
10	MF	POL	Dawid Kort (To Wisła Kraków)
29	FW	POL	Marcin Listkowski (Loan to Raków Częstochowa)
32	MF	POL	Robert Obst (To Ruch Chorzów, previously at Wigry Suwałki)
93	FW	POL	Łukasz Zwoliński (To (Croatia) Gorica)
—	FW	POL	Gracjan Jaroch (Loan to Bytovia Bytów, previously on loan at Błękitni Stargard)

=== Śląsk Wrocław ===
In:

No.	Pos.	Nation	Player
10	MF	IRI	Farshad Ahmadzadeh (From (Iran) Persepolis)
11	MF	POL	Oktawian Skrzecz (Return from GKS Katowice)
12	GK	POL	Dariusz Szczerbal (From Piast Żmigród)
14	DF	POL	Wojciech Golla (From (Netherlands) N.E.C.)
15	FW	POL	Daniel Szczepan (From GKS Jastrzębie)
21	MF	POL	Jakub Łabojko (From Raków Częstochowa)
23	MF	POL	Mateusz Radecki (From Wigry Suwałki)
25	MF	POL	Damian Gąska (From Wigry Suwałki)
28	DF	POL	Łukasz Broź (From Legia Warsaw)

Out:

No.	Pos.	Nation	Player
2	DF	SLO	Boban Jović (Return to (Turkey) Bursaspor)
7	FW	POL	Jakub Kosecki (To (Turkey) Adana Demirspor)
12	GK	POL	Dominik Budzyński (To ŁKS Łódź)
14	MF	POL	Michał Mak (Return to Lechia Gdańsk)
18	MF	POL	Łukasz Madej
19	DF	POL	Mateusz Lewandowski (Return to Lechia Gdańsk)
20	DF	POL	Adam Kokoszka (To Zagłębie Sosnowiec)
21	DF	GER	Tim Rieder (Return to (Germany) FC Augsburg)
22	MF	ESP	Sito Riera
23	FW	POL	Sebastian Bergier (Loan to Stal Mielec)
25	MF	POL	Adrian Łyszczarz (Loan to GKS Katowice)
28	DF	POL	Konrad Poprawa (Loan to Wigry Suwałki)

=== Wisła Kraków ===
In:

No.	Pos.	Nation	Player
1	GK	POL	Mateusz Lis (From Lech Poznań)
2	DF	POL	Rafał Pietrzak (Return from Zagłębie Lubin)
7	MF	POL	Dawid Kort (From Pogoń Szczecin)
17	DF	POL	Jakub Bartosz (Return from Sandecja Nowy Sącz)
99	MF	POL	Riccardo Grym (From (Germany) Borussia Mönchengladbach U–19)

Out:

No.	Pos.	Nation	Player
1	GK	ESP	Julián Cuesta (To (Greece) Aris Thessaloniki)
6	DF	POL	Arkadiusz Głowacki
7	MF	ESP	Pol Llonch (To (Netherlands) Willem II)
10	FW	ESP	Carlitos (To Legia Warsaw)
16	MF	SRB	Nikola Mitrović (To (Azerbaijan) Keşla)
19	MF	POL	Tomasz Cywka (To Lech Poznań)
21	MF	CRO	Petar Brlek (Return to (Italy) Genoa)
23	FW	POL	Paweł Brożek
32	DF	ESP	Iván González (To (Spain) Recreativo de Huelva)
44	DF	ESP	Fran Vélez (To (Greece) Aris Thessaloniki)
71	FW	UKR	Denys Balanyuk (Loan to (Ukraine) Arsenal Kyiv)

=== Wisła Płock ===
In:

No.	Pos.	Nation	Player
2	DF	POL	Marcin Warcholak (From Arka Gdynia)
9	MF	POL	Mateusz Szwoch (From Legia Warsaw)
11	MF	POR	Carlitos (From (Cyprus) Anorthosis Famagusta)
19	FW	POL	Karol Angielski (From Piast Gliwice)
21	FW	BRA	Ricardinho (From (Russia) Tosno)
22	DF	POL	Krystian Miś (From Korona Kielce)
31	GK	POL	Bartłomiej Żynel (From (Austria) Red Bull Salzburg)
99	MF	POL	Patryk Wieliczko (Loan from Olimpia Elbląg)

Out:

No.	Pos.	Nation	Player
2	DF	POL	Kamil Sylwestrzak (To Chojniczanka Chojnice)
9	MF	POL	Arkadiusz Reca (To (Italy) Atalanta)
19	FW	POL	Kamil Biliński
21	MF	POL	Maksymilian Rogalski
22	MF	POL	Dominik Kun (To Stomil Olsztyn, previously on loan at Pogoń Siedlce)
29	FW	GUI	José Kanté (To Legia Warsaw)
45	FW	POL	Mikołaj Lebedyński (Previously on loan at Górnik Łęczna)
77	MF	POL	Konrad Michalak (Return to Legia Warsaw)
87	GK	POL	Seweryn Kiełpin (To Stal Mielec)

=== Zagłębie Lubin ===
In:

No.	Pos.	Nation	Player
7	FW	POL	Artur Siemaszko (Return from Stomil Olsztyn)
37	MF	RUS	Vladislav Sirotov (From (Russia) Zenit-2 Saint Petersburg)
39	MF	SLO	Damjan Bohar (From (Slovenia) Maribor)
96	GK	POL	Mateusz Kuchta (From Górnik Zabrze)

Out:

No.	Pos.	Nation	Player
4	DF	MKD	Aleksandar Todorovski (To (Serbia) Radnički Niš)
8	MF	POL	Sebastian Bonecki (To Odra Opole, previously on loan)
9	FW	POL	Arkadiusz Woźniak (To GKS Katowice)
20	MF	POL	Jarosław Kubicki (To Lechia Gdańsk)
21	FW	POL	Adam Buksa (To Pogoń Szczecin, previously on loan)
22	DF	POL	Rafał Pietrzak (Return to Wisła Kraków)
27	DF	POL	Dominik Jończy (Loan to Podbeskidzie Bielsko-Biała, previously on loan at Chojniczanka Chojnice)
96	MF	POL	Konrad Andrzejczak (To GKS Katowice)
—	FW	CZE	Martin Nešpor (To (Czech Republic) Sigma Olomouc)
—	DF	POL	Serafin Szota (Loan to Odra Opole)

=== Zagłębie Sosnowiec ===
In:

No.	Pos.	Nation	Player
3	DF	POL	Adam Kokoszka (From Śląsk Wrocław)
8	MF	POL	Szymon Pawłowski (From Lech Poznań)
9	FW	NGR	Junior Torunarigha (From (Germany) Alemannia Aachen)
17	DF	GER	Michael Heinloth (From (Netherlands) NEC)
25	DF	POL	Piotr Polczak (From (Romania) Astra Giurgiu)
28	MF	BRA	Mello (From Ruch Chorzów)
72	MF	SLO	Dejan Vokić (From (Slovenia) Triglav Kranj)

Out:

No.	Pos.	Nation	Player
7	DF	POL	Tomasz Nawotka (Return to Legia Warsaw)
8	MF	POL	Rafał Makowski (To Radomiak Radom, previously transferred from Legia Warsaw)
11	MF	POL	Patryk Mularczyk (Loan to GKS Bełchatów)
20	FW	POL	Szymon Lewicki (To Raków Częstochowa)
94	DF	POL	Robert Sulewski (To Arka Gdynia)
