= 2018–19 Śląsk Wrocław season =

Śląsk Wrocław
2018–19 season
- Manager: Tadeusz Pawłowski (-Dec 11); Paweł Barylski (Dec 11-)
- Stadium: Stadion Miejski
- Ekstraklasa: 12th
- Polish Cup: Round of 16
Home colours	Away colours

The 2018–19 Ekstraklasa season was Śląsk's 73rd since their creation, and their 11th continuous season in the top league of Polish football.

The season covered the period from 1 July 2018 to 30 June 2019.

== Transfers ==
=== Players in ===
No.	Pos.	Player	From	Type	Window	Fee	Date	Source
14	DF	Wojciech Golla	N.E.C.	Transfer	Summer	Free	1 July 2018	
15	FW	Daniel Szczepan	GKS Jastrzębie	Transfer	Summer	Free	1 July 2018	
23	MF	Mateusz Radecki	Piast Żmigród	Transfer	Summer	Free	1 July 2018	
25	MF	Damian Gąska	Wigry Suwałki	Transfer	Summer	€63k	1 July 2018	
21	MF	Jakub Łabojko	Raków Częstochowa	Transfer	Summer	€90k	1 July 2018	
10	MF	Farshad Ahmadzadeh	Persepolis	Transfer	Summer	Free	4 July 2018	
28	DF	Łukasz Broź	Legia Warsaw	Transfer	Summer	Free	26 July 2018	

=== Players out ===
No.	Pos.	Player	To	Type	Window	Fee	Date	Source
16	MF	Oktawian Skrzecz	Korona Kielce	Transfer	Summer	Free	20 July 2018	
7	MF	Jakub Kosecki	Adana Demirspor	Transfer	Summer	€300k	24 July 2018	
22	FW	Sito Riera	Enosis Neon	Transfer	Summer	Free	24 July 2018	-
20	DF	Adam Kokoszka	Zagłębie Sosnowiec	Transfer	Summer	Free	1 August 2018	
10	MF	Kamil Vacek	Odense Boldklub	Transfer	Summer	Free	23 August 2018	
28	DF	Konrad Poprawa	Skra Częstochowa	Loan	Summer	Free	1 September 2018	

== Players ==
=== First team squad ===
Note: Flags indicate national team as defined under FIFA eligibility rules; some limited exceptions apply. Players may hold more than one non-FIFA nationality.

No.	Pos.	Nation	Player
1	GK	POL	Jakub Wrąbel
3	DF	POL	Piotr Celeban (Captain)
4	DF	SRB	Đorđe Čotra
5	DF	POR	Augusto
6	MF	POL	Michał Chrapek
8	MF	SRB	Dragoljub Srnić
9	FW	POL	Marcin Robak
10	MF	IRN	Farshad Ahmadzadeh
11	MF	POL	Mateusz Cholewiak
12	GK	POL	Dariusz Szczerbal
14	DF	POL	Wojciech Golla
15	FW	POL	Daniel Szczepan
16	MF	SVK	Róbert Pich
17	DF	POL	Mariusz Pawelec

No.	Pos.	Nation	Player
21	MF	POL	Jakub Łabojko
23	MF	POL	Mateusz Radecki
24	FW	POL	Piotr Samiec-Talar
25	MF	POL	Damian Gąska
26	MF	POL	Daniel Łuczak
27	GK	POL	Jakub Słowik
28	DF	POL	Łukasz Broź
29	FW	POL	Arkadiusz Piech
30	DF	POL	Kamil Dankowski
31	MF	POL	Maciej Pałaszewski
32	DF	LVA	Igors Tarasovs
34	DF	POL	Paweł Kucharczyk
35	MF	FRA	Mathieu Scalet

== Friendlies ==
=== Summer ===
30 June 2018	Piast Gliwice	0-1	Śląsk Wrocław	Kluczbork
12:00 BST			Marcin Robak 87'	Stadium: Stadion Miejski w Kluczborku

7 July 2018	Śląsk Wrocław	1-2	SFC Opava	Wrocław
12:00 BST	Mateusz Cholewiak 23'		Jan Schaffartzik 32'; David Pučkáč 57'	Stadium: Stadion Oporowska

15 July 2018	FC Slovan Liberec	1-1	Śląsk Wrocław	Liberec
13:30 BST	Mateusz Cholewiak 7'		Martin Koscelník 48'	Stadium: Stadion u Nisy

=== Winter ===
16 January 2019	Śląsk Wrocław	3-1	Chrobry Głogów	Środa Śląska
15:00 BST	Farshad Ahmadzadeh 22', 80'; Bartosz Boruń 90'		Michał Pawlik 72'	Stadium: Stadion OSiR

18 January 2019	Śląsk Wrocław	2-1	Odra Opole	Wrocław
12:00 BST	Róbert Pich 45'; Mateusz Radecki 55'		Iván Martín 57'	Stadium: Stadion Oporowska

== Regular season ==
=== Fixtures ===
21 July 2018 1	Śląsk Wrocław	3–1	Cracovia	Wrocław
14:30 BST	Piotr Celeban 15'; Augusto 57'; Jakub Kosecki 89'		Gerard Oliva 30'	Stadium: Stadion Miejski; Attendance: 10,496

27 July 2018 2	Lechia Gdańsk	1-1	Śląsk Wrocław	Gdańsk
17:00 BST	Flávio Paixão 12' (pen.)		Piotr Celeban 68'	Stadium: Stadion Energa Gdańsk; Attendance: 14,068

5 August 2018 3	Śląsk Wrocław	0-1	Lech Poznań	Wrocław
14:30 BST			Pedro Tiba 83'	Stadium: Stadion Miejski; Attendance: 17,926

13 August 2018 4	Korona Kielce	2-1	Śląsk Wrocław	Kielce
17:00 BST	Elia Soriano 20' (pen.); Maciej Górski 81'		Marcin Robak 10'	Stadium: Kielce City Stadium; Attendance: 7,243

20 August 2018 5	Śląsk Wrocław	0–0	Pogoń Szczecin	Wrocław
17:00 BST				Stadium: Stadion Miejski; Attendance: 7,888

27 August 2018 6	Zagłębie Sosnowiec	3-3	Śląsk Wrocław	Sosnowiec
17:00 BST	Vamara Sanogo 57', 59'; Žarko Udovičić 65'		Marcin Robak 11', 90' (pen.); Farshad Ahmadzadeh 26'	Stadium: Stadion Ludowy; Attendance: 3,900

1 September 2018 7	Śląsk Wrocław	0-1	Wisła Kraków	Wrocław
17:00 BST			Zdeněk Ondrášek 89'	Stadium: Stadion Miejski; Attendance: 10,033

15 September 2018 8	Zagłębie Lubin	4-0	Śląsk Wrocław	Lubin
19:30 BST	Filip Starzyński 40'; Filip Jagiełło 45+1'; Marcin Robak 84' (o.g.); Dawid Pakulski 88'			Stadium: Stadion Zagłębia Lubin; Attendance: 6,107

23 September 2018 9	Śląsk Wrocław	4-1	Piast Gliwice	Wrocław
14:30 BST	Arkadiusz Piech 41'; Piotr Celeban 47'; Marcin Robak 75'; Mateusz Cholewiak 87'		Jakub Czerwiński 61'	Stadium: Stadion Miejski; Attendance: 7,613

1 October 2018 10	Jagiellonia Białystok	0-4	Śląsk Wrocław	Białystok
17:00 BST			Marcin Robak 49', 67', 90+1'; Arkadiusz Piech 52'	Stadium: Białystok City Stadium; Attendance: 8,396

6 October 2018 11	Śląsk Wrocław	0-1	Legia Warsaw	Wrocław
19:30 BST			Cafú 34'	Stadium: Stadion Miejski; Attendance: 20,087

20 October 2018 12	Śląsk Wrocław	1-2	Arka Gdynia	Wrocław
17:00 BST	Marcin Robak 45' (pen.)		Mateusz Młyński 39'; Maciej Jankowski 48'	Stadium: Stadion Miejski; Attendance: 9,195

26 October 2018 13	Miedź Legnica	0-5	Śląsk Wrocław	Legnica
17:00 BST			Marcin Robak 15' (pen.), 29'; Michał Chrapek 16'; Đorđe Čotra 34'; Mateusz Radecki 70'	Stadium: Stadion im. Orła Białego; Attendance: 5,934

3 November 2018 14	Śląsk Wrocław	0-3	Wisła Płock	Wrocław
17:00 BST			Damian Szymański 65'; Ricardinho 69'; Giorgi Merebashvili 82'	Stadium: Stadion Miejski; Attendance: 6,364

9 November 2018 15	Górnik Zabrze	2-2	Śląsk Wrocław	Zabrze
17:00 BST	Dani Suárez 26'; Jesús Jiménez 40'		Michał Chrapek 20'; Róbert Pich 60'	Stadium: Ernest Pohl Stadium; Attendance: 7,917

24 November 2018 16	Cracovia	1-1	Śląsk Wrocław	Kraków
19:30 BST	Niko Datković 82'		Róbert Pich 45'	Stadium: Marshal Józef Piłsudski Stadium; Attendance: 4,627

30 November 2018 17	Śląsk Wrocław	0-2	Lechia Gdańsk	Wrocław
17:00 BST			Michał Nalepa 15'; Lukáš Haraslín 25'	Stadium: Stadion Miejski; Attendance: 6,860

7 December 2018 18	Lech Poznań	2-0	Śląsk Wrocław	Poznań
19:30 BST	João Amaral 75'; Christian Gytkjær 90+9'			Stadium: Stadion Miejski; Attendance: 12,545

16 December 2018 19	Śląsk Wrocław	1-1	Korona Kielce	Wrocław
14:30 BST	Róbert Pich 27'		Michael Gardawski 64'	Stadium: Stadion Miejski; Attendance: 3,710

20 December 2018 20	Pogoń Szczecin	2-1	Śląsk Wrocław	Szczecin
17:00 BST	Kamil Drygas 67'; Iker Guarrotxena 72'		Marcin Robak 46'	Stadium: Stadion Florian Krygier; Attendance: 4,212

9 February 2019 21	Śląsk Wrocław	v	Zagłębie Sosnowiec	Wrocław
14:30 BST				Stadium: Stadion Miejski

16 February 2019 22	Wisła Kraków	v	Śląsk Wrocław	Kraków
TBC BST				Stadium: Stadion Miejski

23 February 2019 23	Śląsk Wrocław	v	Zagłębie Lubin	Wrocław
TBC BST				Stadium: Stadion Miejski

2 March 2019 24	Piast Gliwice	v	Śląsk Wrocław	Gliwice
TBC BST				Stadium: Stadion Piast

9 March 2019 25	Śląsk Wrocław	v	Jagiellonia Białystok	Wrocław
TBC BST				Stadium: Stadion Miejski

16 March 2019 26	Legia Warsaw	v	Śląsk Wrocław	Warsaw
TBC BST				Stadium: Polish Army Stadium

30 March 2019 27	Arka Gdynia	v	Śląsk Wrocław	Gdynia
TBC BST				Stadium: Stadion GOSiR

3 April 2019 28	Śląsk Wrocław	v	Miedź Legnica	Wrocław
TBC BST				Stadium: Stadion Miejski

6 April 2019 29	Wisła Płock	v	Śląsk Wrocław	Płock
TBC BST				Stadium: Kazimierz Górski Stadium

13 April 2019 30	Śląsk Wrocław	v	Górnik Zabrze	Wrocław
TBC BST				Stadium: Stadion Miejski

==== League table ====
Pos	Team	Pld	W	D	L	GF	GA	GD	Pts	Qualification
11	Miedź Legnica	30	8	8	14	30	52	−22	32	Qualification for the Relegation round
12	Górnik Zabrze	30	7	10	13	36	49	−13	31 (Note: Head-to-head record: Górnik Zabrze 2–2 Śląsk Wrocław, Śląsk Wrocław 0–1 Górnik Zabrze.)	Qualification for the Relegation round
13	Śląsk Wrocław	30	8	7	15	35	37	−2	31	Qualification for the Relegation round
14	Wisła Płock	30	7	9	14	40	49	−9	30	Qualification for the Relegation round
15	Arka Gdynia	30	6	11	13	39	44	−5	29	Qualification for the Relegation round

Source: Ekstraklasa, 90minut
Rules for classification: 1) Points; 2) Head-to-head points; 3) Head-to-head goal difference; 4) Head-to-head goals scored; 5) Head-to-head away goals scored (only if two teams); 6) Goal difference; 7) Goals scored; 8) Fairplay ranking; 9) Draw. (Note: Head-to-head record is used only after all the matches between the teams in question have been played.)

== Polish Cup ==
26 September 2018 First round	Olimpia Elbląg	0-3	Śląsk Wrocław	Elbląg
14:00 GMT			Arkadiusz Piech 11', 29'; Mateusz Radecki 90+1'	Stadium: City Stadium Elbląg; Attendance: 1,333

30 October 2018 Round of 32	Bytovia Bytów	0-3	Śląsk Wrocław	Bytów
14:00 GMT			Damian Gąska 37', 82'; Mateusz Oszmaniec 43' (o.g.)	Stadium: MOSiR Stadium; Attendance: 1,500

4 December 2018 Round of 16	Śląsk Wrocław	0-1	Miedź Legnica	Wrocław
16:00 GMT			Borja Fernández 43'	Stadium: Stadion Miejski; Attendance: 4,008
