= 2018–19 Jagiellonia Białystok season =

Jagiellonia Białystok
2018–19 season
- Manager: Ireneusz Mamrot
- Stadium: Białystok Stadium
- Ekstraklasa: 5th
- Polish Cup: Runners-up
- UEFA Europa League: Third qualifying round
- Top goalscorer: League: Jesús Imaz (10); All: Jesús Imaz (10)
Home colours	Away colours	Third colours

The 2018–19 season was Jagiellonia Białystok's 12th consecutive season in the Ekstraklasa and 98th year in existence as a football club. In addition to the domestic league, Jagiellonia Białystok participated in this season's editions of the Polish Cup and the UEFA Europa League.

== Squad ==
As of 8 April 2019

Note: Flags indicate national team as defined under FIFA eligibility rules; some limited exceptions apply. Players may hold more than one non-FIFA nationality.

No.	Pos.	Nation	Player
2	DF	SVK	Andrej Kadlec
5	DF	SLO	Nemanja Mitrović
6	MF	POL	Taras Romanczuk
7	DF	POL	Jakub Wójcicki
9	MF	LTU	Arvydas Novikovas
10	FW	SRB	Stefan Šćepović
11	MF	ESP	Jesús Imaz
12	DF	BRA	Guilherme
13	MF	SRB	Mile Savković
14	MF	LTU	Justas Lasickas
15	DF	CRO	Zoran Arsenić
17	DF	CRO	Ivan Runje
19	DF	ISL	Böðvar Böðvarsson

No.	Pos.	Nation	Player
20	MF	SRB	Marko Poletanović
25	GK	SVK	Marián Kelemen
26	MF	CZE	Martin Pospíšil
27	MF	SVK	Martin Adamec
29	GK	POL	Grzegorz Sandomierski
33	GK	POL	Wiktor Kaczorowski
41	DF	POL	Michał Ozga
42	MF	POL	Szymon Łapiński
66	GK	POL	Jakub Miszczuk
77	MF	SVK	Martin Košťál
98	FW	POL	Patryk Klimala
99	MF	POL	Bartosz Kwiecień

== Transfers ==
In:

No.	Pos.	Nation	Player
4	DF	POL	Lukas Klemenz (From GKS Katowice)
13	MF	SRB	Mile Savković (From (Serbia) Spartak Subotica)
29	GK	POL	Grzegorz Sandomierski
66	GK	POL	Jakub Miszczuk (From Stomil Olsztyn)
89	MF	POL	Mateusz Machaj (From Chrobry Głogów)
98	FW	POL	Patryk Klimala (Return from Wigry Suwałki)

Out:

No.	Pos.	Nation	Player
3	DF	POL	Jonatan Straus (Loan to Wigry Suwałki, previously on loan at Sandecja Nowy Sącz)
14	DF	POL	Marek Wasiluk (To Chrobry Głogów)
16	DF	BRA	Gutieri Tomelin (To (Croatia) NK Osijek)
46	GK	POL	Hubert Gostomski (Loan to Bruk-Bet Termalica Nieciecza)
66	GK	GEO	Luka Gugeshashvili (Loan to (Georgia (country)) Dila Gori)
81	GK	POL	Mariusz Pawełek (To GKS Katowice)
95	DF	POL	Dawid Szymonowicz (Loan to Bruk-Bet Termalica Nieciecza)
—	MF	SVK	Martin Adamec (Loan to Wigry Suwałki)
—	DF	POL	Rafał Augustyniak (To Miedź Legnica, previously on loan)
—	FW	POL	Maciej Górski (To Korona Kielce, previously on loan at Chojniczanka Chojnice)
—	MF	POL	Przemysław Mystkowski (Loan to Podbeskidzie Bielsko-Biała)

== Competitions ==
=== Overview ===
Competition	First match	Last match	Starting round	Final position	Record							
Competition	First match	Last match	Starting round	Final position	Pld	W	D	L	GF	GA	GD	Win %
Ekstraklasa	20 July 2018	19 May 2019	Matchday 1	5th	37	16	9	12	55	52	+3	43.24
Polish Cup	26 September 2018	2 May 2019	Round of 64	Runners-up	6	5	0	1	8	2	+6	83.33
UEFA Europa League	26 July 2018	16 August 2018	Second qualifying round	Third qualifying round	4	1	1	2	6	8	−2	25.00
Total					47	22	10	15	69	62	+7	46.81

Source: Competitions

=== Ekstraklasa ===
==== Results summary ====
Overall								Home						Away					
Pld	W	D	L	GF	GA	GD	Pts	W	D	L	GF	GA	GD	W	D	L	GF	GA	GD
37	16	9	12	55	52	+3	57	9	4	5	30	30	0	7	5	7	25	22	+3

Source: Competitions

==== Regular season ====
===== League table =====
Pos	Team	Pld	W	D	L	GF	GA	GD	Pts	Qualification
4	Cracovia	30	14	6	10	39	34	+5	48	Qualification for the Championship round
5	Zagłębie Lubin	30	14	5	11	48	38	+10	47 (Note: Head-to-head record: Zagłębie Lubin 0–2 Jagiellonia Białystok, Jagiellonia Białystok 0–4 Zagłębie Lubin.)	Qualification for the Championship round
6	Jagiellonia Białystok	30	13	8	9	45	41	+4	47	Qualification for the Championship round
7	Pogoń Szczecin	30	12	7	11	44	42	+2	43 (Note: Head-to-head record: Pogoń Szczecin 3–0 Lech Poznań, Lech Poznań 3–2 Pogoń Szczecin.)	Qualification for the Championship round
8	Lech Poznań	30	13	4	13	41	40	+1	43	Qualification for the Championship round

Source: Ekstraklasa, 90minut
Rules for classification: 1) Points; 2) Head-to-head points; 3) Head-to-head goal difference; 4) Head-to-head goals scored; 5) Head-to-head away goals scored (only if two teams); 6) Goal difference; 7) Goals scored; 8) Fairplay ranking; 9) Draw. (Note: Head-to-head record is used only after all the matches between the teams in question have been played.)

===== Matches =====
20 July 2018 1	Jagiellonia Białystok	0–1	Lechia Gdańsk	Białystok
20:30 CEST (UTC+2)		Report	Paixão 10'	Stadium: Białystok Stadium; Referee: Łukasz Szczech

29 July 2018 2	Arka Gdynia	0–2	Jagiellonia Białystok	Gdynia
18:00 CEST (UTC+2)		Report	Świderski 37', 67'	Stadium: Gdynia Stadium; Referee: Krzysztof Jakubik

5 August 2018 3	Jagiellonia Białystok	1–0	Wisła Kraków	Białystok
18:00 CEST (UTC+2)	Bezjak 60'	Report		Stadium: Białystok Stadium; Referee: Szymon Marciniak

12 August 2018 4	Zagłębie Lubin	0–2	Jagiellonia Białystok	Lubin
18:00 CEST (UTC+2)		Report	Bezjak 25'; Balić 72' (o.g.)	Stadium: Lubin Stadium; Referee: Tomasz Kwiatkowski

19 August 2018 5	Jagiellonia Białystok	2–1	Piast Gliwice	Białystok
18:00 CEST (UTC+2)	Savković 22'; Novikovas 90+4'	Report	Dziczek 58'	Stadium: Białystok Stadium; Referee: Daniel Stefański

26 August 2018 6	Jagiellonia Białystok	2–3	Miedź Legnica	Białystok
15:30 CEST (UTC+2)	Bezjak 69'; Romanczuk 81'	Report	Forsell 73', 82'; Augustyniak 87'	Stadium: Białystok Stadium; Referee: Piotr Lasyk

2 September 2018 7	Wisła Płock	1–1	Jagiellonia Białystok	Płock
15:30 CEST (UTC+2)	Ricardinho 23'	Report	Klemenz 55'	Stadium: Kazimierz Górski Stadium; Referee: Paweł Raczkowski

14 September 2018 8	Jagiellonia Białystok	3–1	Cracovia	Białystok
20:30 CEST (UTC+2)	Kwiecień 44'; Sheridan 53', 69'	Report	Airam 74'	Stadium: Białystok Stadium; Referee: Jarosław Przybył

23 September 2018 9	Górnik Zabrze	1–3	Jagiellonia Białystok	Zabrze
18:00 CEST (UTC+2)	Angulo 3'	Report	Bezjak 54'; Novikovas 62'; Frankowski 89'	Stadium: Arena Zabrze; Referee: Bartosz Frankowski

1 October 2018 10	Jagiellonia Białystok	0–4	Śląsk Wrocław	Białystok
18:00 CEST (UTC+2)		Report	Čotra (yellow card) 34'; Robak 49', 67', 90+1'; Piech 52'	Stadium: Białystok Stadium; Referee: Piotr Lasyk

7 October 2018 11	Korona Kielce	1–1	Jagiellonia Białystok	Kielce
15:30 CEST (UTC+2)	Pučko 55'	Report	Novikovas 18'	Stadium: Kielce Stadium; Referee: Paweł Gil

19 October 2018 12	Jagiellonia Białystok	2–1	Pogoń Szczecin	Białystok
20:30 CEST (UTC+2)	Frankowski 48'; Runje 81'	Report	Kožulj 64'	Stadium: Białystok Stadium; Referee: Daniel Stefański

26 October 2018 13	Jagiellonia Białystok	1–1	Legia Warsaw	Białystok
20:30 CEST (UTC+2)	Runje 1'	Report	Kulenović 89'	Stadium: Białystok Stadium; Referee: Mariusz Złotek

5 November 2018 14	Zagłębie Sosnowiec	1–4	Jagiellonia Białystok	Sosnowiec
18:00 CET (UTC+1)	Sanogo 77'	Report	Świderski 38', 54'; Novikovas 46'; Burliga 90+3'	Stadium: Sosnowiec People's Stadium; Referee: Jarosław Przybył

11 November 2018 15	Jagiellonia Białystok	2–2	Lech Poznań	Białystok
18:00 CET (UTC+1)	Frankowski 21'; Świderski 50'	Report	Rogne 27'; Wasielewski 33'	Stadium: Białystok Stadium; Referee: Bartosz Frankowski

25 November 2018 16	Lechia Gdańsk	3–2	Jagiellonia Białystok	Gdańsk
18:00 CET (UTC+1)	Paixão 37' (pen.); Kubicki 45'; Nalepa 67'	Report	Poletanović 39'; Novikovas 53'	Stadium: Stadion Energa Gdańsk; Referee: Tomasz Musiał

30 November 2018 17	Jagiellonia Białystok	3–1	Arka Gdynia	Białystok
20:30 CET (UTC+1)	Świderski 58', 63'; Novikovas 83'	Report	Janota 51'	Stadium: Białystok Stadium; Referee: Jarosław Przybył

8 December 2018 18	Wisła Kraków	2–2	Jagiellonia Białystok	Kraków
20:30 CET (UTC+1)	Kolar 17', 36'	Report	Poletanović 61'; Sheridan 68'	Stadium: Henryk Reyman Stadium; Referee: Tomasz Kwiatkowski

14 December 2018 19	Jagiellonia Białystok	0–4	Zagłębie Lubin	Białystok
20:30 CET (UTC+1)		Report	Tuszyński 6', 40'; Bohar 37'; Pawłowski 83'	Stadium: Białystok Stadium; Referee: Krzysztof Jakubik

21 December 2018 20	Piast Gliwice	1–1	Jagiellonia Białystok	Gliwice
18:00 CET (UTC+1)	Hateley 16'	Report	Świderski 23'	Stadium: Stadion Piast; Referee: Szymon Marciniak

8 February 2019 21	Miedź Legnica	0–3	Jagiellonia Białystok	Legnica
18:00 CET (UTC+1)		Report	Mitrović 15'; Guilherme 45' (pen.); Novikovas 74'	Stadium: Stadion Miejski; Referee: Bartosz Frankowski

16 February 2019 22	Jagiellonia Białystok	1–0	Wisła Płock	Białystok
15:30 CET (UTC+1)	Wójcicki 90+5'	Report		Stadium: Białystok Stadium; Referee: Tomasz Kwiatkowski

24 February 2019 23	Cracovia	1–0	Jagiellonia Białystok	Kraków
18:00 CET (UTC+1)	Dytyatyev 48'	Report		Stadium: Józef Piłsudski Cracovia Stadium; Referee: Szymon Marciniak

2 March 2019 24	Jagiellonia Białystok	2–2	Górnik Zabrze	Białystok
18:00 CET (UTC+1)	Guilherme 23' (pen.); Novikovas 57'	Report	Żurkowski 25'; Angulo 89'	Stadium: Białystok Stadium; Referee: Jarosław Przybył

8 March 2019 25	Śląsk Wrocław	2–0	Jagiellonia Białystok	Wrocław
20:30 CET (UTC+1)	Chrapek 8'; Robak 25'	Report		Stadium: Wrocław Stadium; Referee: Paweł Raczkowski

16 March 2019 26	Jagiellonia Białystok	1–3	Korona Kielce	Białystok
15:30 CET (UTC+1)	Imaz 77'	Report	Arveladze 36'; Pučko 43'; Brown Forbes 90+4'	Stadium: Białystok Stadium; Referee: Tomasz Musiał

31 March 2019 27	Pogoń Szczecin	0–0	Jagiellonia Białystok	Szczecin
15:30 CET (UTC+1)		Report		Stadium: Florian Krygier Stadium; Referee: Daniel Stefański

3 April 2019 28	Legia Warsaw	3–0	Jagiellonia Białystok	Warsaw
20:30 CEST (UTC+2)	Hämäläinen 37'; Szymański 42'; Martins 66'	Report		Stadium: Polish Army Stadium; Referee: Szymon Marciniak

6 April 2019 29	Jagiellonia Białystok	2–1	Zagłębie Sosnowiec	Białystok
15:30 CEST (UTC+2)	Imaz 19' (pen.); Klimala 34'	Report	Sanogo 82' (pen.)	Stadium: Białystok Stadium; Referee: Zbigniew Dobrynin

13 April 2019 30	Lech Poznań	0–2	Jagiellonia Białystok	Poznań
18:00 CEST (UTC+2)	Vujadinović (yellow card) 59'	Report	Imaz 45+4', 60'	Stadium: Poznań Stadium; Referee: Bartosz Frankowski

==== Championship round ====
===== League table =====
Pos	Team	Pld	W	D	L	GF	GA	GD	Pts	Qualification
3	Lechia Gdańsk	37	19	10	8	54	38	+16	67	Qualification for the Europa League second qualifying round (Note: Lechia Gdańsk qualified for the Europa League second qualifying round by winning the 2018–19 Polish Cup.)
4	Cracovia	37	17	6	14	45	43	+2	57 (Note: Points in regular season: Cracovia 48 points, Jagiellonia Białystok 47 points.)	Qualification for the Europa League first qualifying round
5	Jagiellonia Białystok	37	16	9	12	55	52	+3	57	
6	Zagłębie Lubin	37	15	8	14	57	48	+9	53	
7	Pogoń Szczecin	37	14	10	13	57	54	+3	52 (Note: Head-to-head in regular season record: Pogoń Szczecin 3–0 Lech Poznań, Lech Poznań 3–2 Pogoń Szczecin.)	

Source: Ekstraklasa, 90minut
Rules for classification: 1) Points; 2) Points in regular season; 3) Head-to-head points in regular season; 4) Head-to-head goal difference in regular season; 5) Head-to-head goals scored in regular season; 5) Head-to-head away goals scored in regular season (if only two teams); 7) Goal difference; 8) Goals scored; 9) Fairplay ranking; 10) Play-off (only if needed to decide champion, teams for relegation or teams for UEFA competitions).

===== Matches =====
20 April 2019 31	Jagiellonia Białystok	3–3	Lech Poznań	Białystok
18:00 CEST (UTC+2)	Imaz 42' (pen.), 64' (pen.); Kadlec 54'	Report	Vujadinović 5'; Amaral 21'; Zhamaletdinov 77'	Stadium: Białystok Stadium; Referee: Daniel Stefański

23 April 2019 32	Cracovia	0–1	Jagiellonia Białystok	Kraków
20:30 CEST (UTC+2)		Report	Imaz 21' (pen.)	Stadium: Józef Piłsudski Cracovia Stadium; Referee: Tomasz Kwiatkowski

26 April 2019 33	Zagłębie Lubin	2–0	Jagiellonia Białystok	Lubin
18:00 CEST (UTC+2)	Bohar 6'; Tuszyński 28'	Report	Arsenić (yellow card) 54'	Stadium: Lubin Stadium; Referee: Mariusz Złotek

6 May 2019 34	Jagiellonia Białystok	4–2	Pogoń Szczecin	Białystok
18:00 CEST (UTC+2)	Imaz 3', 66'; Runje 7'; Pospíšil 88'	Report	Kowalczyk 21'; Kožulj 79', (yellow card) 80'	Stadium: Białystok Stadium; Referee: Łukasz Szczech

12 May 2019 35	Piast Gliwice	2–1	Jagiellonia Białystok	Gliwice
13:00 CEST (UTC+2)	Valencia 45+3'; Jodłowiec 90+1'	Report	Imaz 89' (pen.)	Stadium: Stadion Piast; Referee: Jarosław Przybył

15 May 2019 36	Jagiellonia Białystok	1–0	Legia Warsaw	Białystok
20:30 CEST (UTC+2)	Wieteska 28' (o.g.)	Report		Stadium: Białystok Stadium; Referee: Szymon Marciniak

19 May 2019 37	Lechia Gdańsk	2–0	Jagiellonia Białystok	Gdańsk
18:00 CEST (UTC+2)	Fila 44'; Kubicki 73'	Report		Stadium: Stadion Energa Gdańsk; Referee: Paweł Gil

=== Polish Cup ===
26 September 2018 Round of 64	Lechia Dzierżoniów	0–1	Jagiellonia Białystok	Dzierżoniów
16:00 CEST (UTC+2)		Report	Świderski 59'	Stadium: Stadion im. Jerzego Michałowicza; Referee: Sebastian Tarnowski

31 October 2018 Round of 32	GKS Katowice	0–1 (a.e.t.)	Jagiellonia Białystok	Katowice
20:30 CET (UTC+1)		Report	Guilherme 120+4' (pen.)	Stadium: GKS Katowice Stadium; Referee: Krzysztof Jakubik

4 December 2018 Round of 16	Arka Gdynia	0–2	Jagiellonia Białystok	Gdynia
20:30 CET (UTC+1)		Report	Sheridan 75'; Klimala 86'	Stadium: Gdynia Stadium; Referee: Krzysztof Jakubik

12 March 2019 Quarter-finals	Odra Opole	0–2	Jagiellonia Białystok	Opole
18:00 CET (UTC+1)		Report	Klimala 73', 90+2'	Stadium: Stadion Miejski; Referee: Krzysztof Jakubik

9 April 2019 Semi-finals	Jagiellonia Białystok	2–1	Miedź Legnica	Białystok
18:00 CEST (UTC+2)	Romanczuk 61', 90+1'	Report	Forsell 78'	Stadium: Białystok Stadium; Referee: Paweł Gil

2 May 2019 Final	Jagiellonia Białystok	0–1	Lechia Gdańsk	Warsaw
16:00 CEST (UTC+2)	Arsenić (yellow card) 48'	Report	Augustyn (yellow card) 67'; Sobiech 90+6'	Stadium: PGE Narodowy; Referee: Bartosz Frankowski

=== UEFA Europa League ===
==== Qualifying rounds ====
===== Second qualifying round =====
26 July 2018 First leg	Jagiellonia Białystok (Poland)	1–0	(Portugal) Rio Ave	Białystok, Poland
19:20 CEST (UTC+2)	Machaj 9'; Kwiecień (yellow card) 30'; Romanczuk (yellow card) 76'	Report	Gabrielzinho (yellow card) 80'	Stadium: Białystok Stadium; Attendance: 13,725; Referee: Ricardo de Burgos Bengoetxea (Spain)

2 August 2018 Second leg	Rio Ave (Portugal)	4–4 (4–5 agg.)	(Poland) Jagiellonia Białystok	Vila do Conde, Portugal
20:00 WEST (UTC+1)	Galeno 27', 45+2', (yellow card) 40'; Gelson 63'; Furtado 84'	Report	Sheridan 6'; Machaj (yellow card) 34'; Romanczuk 56', 79'; Frankowski (yellow card) 62'; Pospíšil 72'; Burliga (yellow card) 87'	Stadium: Estádio dos Arcos; Attendance: 5,930; Referee: Marco Di Bello (Italy)
Note: Jagiellonia Białystok won 5–4 on aggregate.

===== Third qualifying round =====
9 August 2018 First leg	Jagiellonia Białystok (Poland)	0–1	(Belgium) Gent	Białystok, Poland
19:20 CEST (UTC+2)	Novikovas (yellow card) 45+1'; Kwiecień (yellow card) 69'; Machaj (yellow card) 89'	Report	Foket (yellow card) 62'; David 85'	Stadium: Białystok Stadium; Attendance: 15,591; Referee: Ali Palabıyık (Turkey)

16 August 2018 Second leg	Gent (Belgium)	3–1 (4–1 agg.)	(Poland) Jagiellonia Białystok	Ghent, Belgium
20:30 CEST (UTC+2)	Awoniyi 13', (yellow card) 13'; Asare (yellow card) 65'; Andrijašević (yellow card) 67'; Yaremchuk 84', (yellow card) 85'; David 89'	Report	Runje (yellow card) 18'; Romanczuk (yellow card) 48'; Pospíšil 58'	Stadium: Ghelamco Arena; Attendance: 16,000; Referee: Bastian Dankert (Germany)
Note: Gent won 4–1 on aggregate.
