= Taras Romanczuk =

Polish footballer (born 1991)

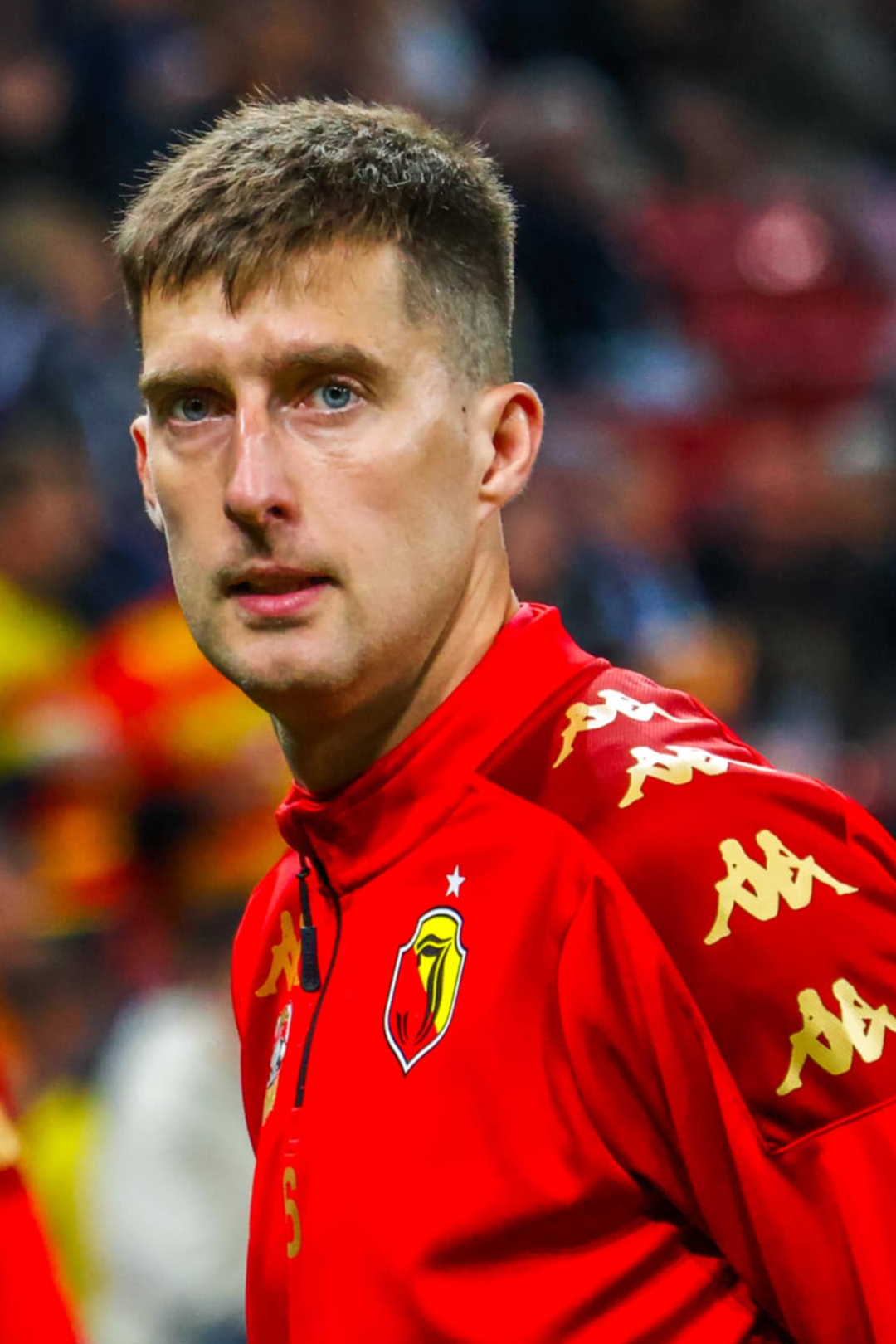
- Romanczuk with Jagiellonia Białystok in 2025

Personal information
- Full name: Taras Wiktorowycz Romanczuk
- Birth name: Taras Viktorovych Romanchuk
- Date of birth: 14 November 1991 (age 35)
- Place of birth: Kovel, Ukraine
- Height: 1.86 m (6 ft 1 in)
- Position: Defensive midfielder

Team information
- Current team: Jagiellonia Białystok
- Number: 6

Youth career
- 2004–2005: MFK Kovel
- 2005: BRW-BIK Volodymyr-Volynskyi
- 2006–2008: MFK Kovel

Senior career*
Years	Team	Apps	(Gls)
2010–2013	Apperkot Kovel (futsal)	34	(13)
2013–2014	Legionovia Legionowo	45	(3)
2014–	Jagiellonia Białystok	367	(33)

International career^{‡}
2018–2024	Poland	5	(1)
- * Club domestic league appearances and goals as of 19:04, 20 September 2026 (UTC) ‡ National team caps and goals as of 15 November 2024

Taras Wiktorowycz Romanczuk (Polish pronunciation: [ˈtaras roˈmantʂuk] also spelled Romanchuk, Ukrainian: Тарас Вікторович Романчук; born 14 November 1991) is a professional footballer who plays as a defensive midfielder for and captains Ekstraklasa club Jagiellonia Białystok. Born in Ukraine, he plays for the Poland national team.

== Club career ==
After starting his youth career for MFK Kovel and BRW-BIK (both Volhynian youth clubs) at Ukrainian Youth Football League, Romanczuk played for Ukrainian mini-football club Apperkot Kovel, making his debut in 2010.

=== Legionovia Legionowo ===
In February 2013, Romanczuk joined Legionovia Legionowo in the fourth division in 2013. He made He his debut on 13 April 2013 in a league match against Zawisza Rzgów, when in the 46th minute he replaced Łukasz Prusik on the pitch. He scored his first goal on 5 June 2013 in a 3–0 league win against GKP Targówek. Legionovia finished that season as the winner of their group, thus ensuring the promotion to the II liga.

=== Jagiellonia ===
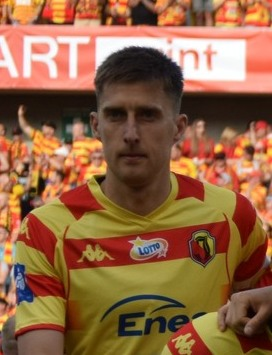
Romanczuk lining up for Jagiellonia Białystok in 2024

On 21 July 2014, Romanczuk joined Polish Ekstraklasa club Jagiellonia Białystok on a one-year contract with the option of extending for another two years. He made his debut on 15 August 2014, replacing Jonatan Straus in the 46th minute of the league match against Legia Warsaw. His first goal for Jagiellonia recorded on 9 November 2014 during a 5–2 loss against Ruch Chorzów.

On 2 July 2015, Romanczuk made his European debut in a 1–0 win against Kruoja Pakruojis in the UEFA Europa League. In the summer of 2016, Turkish side Konyaspor had a bid rejected for the player. He became vice-captain to the captain Rafał Grzyb.

During the 2016–17 Ekstraklasa season, Romanczuk aided Jagiellonia as they finished the campaign as runners-up for the first time in their history in the Ekstraklasa, two points behind the winners Legia Warsaw. and at the beginning of January 2017 he was honoured with the award of the best defensive midfielder of Ekstraklasa in 2016. During the 2017–18 Ekstraklasa, Jagiellonia achieved a second-place finish for the second season running, after finishing three points behind Legia yet again.

On 20 April 2024, Romanczuk played the full 90 minutes in a 2–1 away win over Zagłębie Lubin; it was his 300th Ekstraklasa appearance for Jagiellonia, and he became the first player in the club's history to achieve such feat. As the club's captain, he led them to their first-ever Ekstraklasa title in May 2024.

== International career ==
Romanczuk received Polish citizenship on 15 March 2018, making him eligible for the Poland national team. Taras was called up for friendlies against Nigeria and South Korea, subsequently making his debut against the latter, playing 61 minutes before being subbed for Arkadiusz Milik.

In May 2018, he was a surprise omission from the initial 35-man preliminary squad for the 2018 FIFA World Cup.

In March 2024, he received his first call-up in almost six years for UEFA Euro 2024 qualifying play-off matches against Estonia and Wales to be played on 21 and 26 March. He made an appearance in the latter, coming on as a substitute at the start of the second half of extra-time.

On 29 May 2024, Romanczuk was named the 29-man preliminary squad for UEFA Euro 2024. He then scored his first international goal in a friendly against his ancestral Ukraine on 7 June 2024, before leaving the pitch with an injury in the 60th minute. Later that day, he was confirmed to have made the squad for the tournament.

== Personal life ==
Romanczuk was born and raised in Ukraine, but has spent all of his professional career in Poland. He also has Polish roots on one side of his family: his great-grandfather was a farmer from Sobibór and his grandmother was born in Włodawa (1939).

He received Polish citizenship in March 2018.

== Career statistics ==
=== Club ===
As of match played 16 September 2026

Appearances and goals by club, season and competition
Club	Season	League			Polish Cup		Europe		Other		Total	
Club	Season	Division	Apps	Goals	Apps	Goals	Apps	Goals	Apps	Goals	Apps	Goals
Legionovia Legionowo	2012–13	III liga, gr. A	13	1	—		—		—		13	1
Legionovia Legionowo	2013–14	II liga East	32	2	—		—		—		32	2
Legionovia Legionowo	Total		45	3	—		—		—		45	3
Jagiellonia Białystok	2014–15	Ekstraklasa	27	4	2	0	—		—		29	4
Jagiellonia Białystok	2015–16	Ekstraklasa	33	3	2	0	4 (Note: Appearances in UEFA Europa League)	0	—		39	3
Jagiellonia Białystok	2016–17	Ekstraklasa	33	5	2	0	—		—		35	5
Jagiellonia Białystok	2017–18	Ekstraklasa	33	5	1	0	4	1	—		38	6
Jagiellonia Białystok	2018–19	Ekstraklasa	33	1	5	2	4	2	—		42	5
Jagiellonia Białystok	2019–20	Ekstraklasa	35	3	1	0	—		—		36	3
Jagiellonia Białystok	2020–21	Ekstraklasa	25	2	1	0	—		—		26	2
Jagiellonia Białystok	2021–22	Ekstraklasa	30	3	1	0	—		—		31	3
Jagiellonia Białystok	2022–23	Ekstraklasa	24	1	1	0	—		—		25	1
Jagiellonia Białystok	2023–24	Ekstraklasa	30	1	5	0	—		—		35	1
Jagiellonia Białystok	2024–25	Ekstraklasa	26	2	2	0	15 (Note: Four appearances in UEFA Champions League, two appearances in UEFA Europa League, nine appearances and one goal in UEFA Conference League)	1	1 (Note: Appearance in Polish Super Cup)	0	44	3
Jagiellonia Białystok	2025–26	Ekstraklasa	32	3	1	0	13 (Note: Appearances in UEFA Conference League)	1	—		46	4
Jagiellonia Białystok	2026–27	Ekstraklasa	6	0	0	0	5	0	—		11	0
Jagiellonia Białystok	Total		367	33	24	2	45	5	1	0	437	40
Career total			412	36	24	2	45	5	1	0	482	43

=== International ===
As of match played 15 November 2024

Appearances and goals by national team and year
National team	Year	Apps	Goals
Poland	2018	1	0
Poland	2019	0	0
Poland	2020	0	0
Poland	2021	0	0
Poland	2022	0	0
Poland	2023	0	0
Poland	2024	4	1
Total		5	1

Scores and results list Poland goal tally first, score column indicates score after each Romanczuk goal

List of international goals scored by Taras Romanczuk
No.	Date	Venue	Opponent	Score	Result	Competition
1	7 June 2024	National Stadium, Warsaw, Poland	Ukraine	3–0	3–1	Friendly

== Honours ==
Legionovia Legionowo

- III liga, group A: 2012–13

Jagiellonia Białystok

- Ekstraklasa: 2023–24
- Polish Super Cup: 2024

Individual

- Ekstraklasa Player of the Year: 2024
