= Skrzecz =

Skrzecz is a Polish surname. Notable people with the surname include:

- Grzegorz Skrzecz (1957–2023), Polish boxer
- Oktawian Skrzecz (born 1997), Polish footballer
- Paweł Skrzecz (born 1957), Polish boxer
