= Robert Sulewski =

Polish footballer

Personal information
- Full name: Robert Sulewski
- Date of birth: 7 February 1994 (age 32)
- Place of birth: Gdynia, Poland
- Height: 1.81 m (5 ft 11 in)
- Position: Defender

Team information
- Current team: Arka Gdynia U19 (assistant coach)

Youth career
- –2014: Arka Gdynia

Senior career*
Years	Team	Apps	(Gls)
2012–2014	Arka Gdynia II	49	(2)
2014–2015	Arka Gdynia	10	(1)
2015–2017	Stal Mielec	76	(2)
2017–2018	Zagłębie Sosnowiec	15	(0)
2018–2019	Arka Gdynia	2	(0)
2019	Arka Gdynia II	20	(7)
2019–2020	Concordia Elbląg	5	(0)
2020	Sokół Ostróda	2	(0)
2020–2021	Radunia Stężyca	17	(1)
2021–2022	GKS Przodkowo	22	(0)
2023–2025	Jaguar Gdańsk	50	(3)
Total		268	(16)

International career
2012	Poland U19	3	(0)
- * Club domestic league appearances and goals

Robert Sulewski (born 7 February 1994) is a Polish former professional footballer who played as a defender. He is currently the assistant coach of Arka Gdynia's under-19 team.

== Career ==
In February 2019, Sulewski was demoted to the reserve team of Arka Gdynia and was told to find a new club. He left the club in the summer 2019 and then joined Concordia Elbląg in October, before signing with Sokół Ostróda on 14 January 2020.
