= Maciej Pałaszewski =

Polish association football player

Personal information
- Date of birth: 7 April 1998 (age 28)
- Place of birth: Wrocław, Poland
- Height: 1.75 m (5 ft 9 in)
- Position: Midfielder

Team information
- Current team: Bałtyk Koszalin

Youth career
- –2013: Polar Wrocław
- 2013–2014: Śląsk Wrocław

Senior career*
Years	Team	Apps	(Gls)
2014–2021	Śląsk Wrocław II	73	(5)
2016–2021	Śląsk Wrocław	36	(0)
2016	→ Raków Częstochowa (loan)	1	(0)
2019–2020	→ Stomil Olsztyn (loan)	33	(2)
2021–2022	Górnik Polkowice	19	(1)
2022	A.E. Kifisia	15	(0)
2022–2023	Wieczysta Kraków	15	(0)
2023	Olimpia Grudziądz	15	(1)
2024	Karkonosze Jelenia Góra	30	(1)
2025–2026	Warta Gorzów Wielkopolski	46	(2)
2026–	Bałtyk Koszalin	0	(0)

International career
2015–2016	Poland U18	5	(0)
2016	Poland U19	2	(1)
2018	Poland U20	1	(0)
- * Club domestic league appearances and goals as of 17:38, 5 June 2026 (UTC)

Maciej Pałaszewski (born 7 April 1998) is a Polish professional footballer who plays as a midfielder for III liga club Bałtyk Koszalin. He has represented Poland at youth international level.

== Club career ==
Pałaszewski started his career with Śląsk Wrocław.

On 9 August 2016, Pałaszewski made his senior debut whilst on loan at Raków Częstochowa, playing the first half in a 3–2 loss to KSZO Ostrowiec in the Polish Cup. The following season, on 23 October 2017, he made his league debut for Śląsk Wrocław as a 77th minute substitute in a 4–1 loss to Wisła Płock.

== International career ==
Pałaszewski has represented Poland at under-18, under-19 and under-20 level.

== Honours ==
Śląsk Wrocław II

- IV liga Lower Silesia East: 2018–19

Wieczysta Kraków

- Polish Cup (Lesser Poland regionals): 2022–23

Karkonosze Jelenia Góra

- Polish Cup (Jelenia Góra regionals): 2023–24
