= Ksawerów, Łódź East County =

Ksawerów
- Village
- Location within Poland
- Coordinates: 51°47′42″N 19°40′31″E
- Country: Poland
- Voivodeship: Łódź
- County: Łódź East
- Gmina: Nowosolna

Ksawerów [ksaˈvɛruf] is a village in the administrative district of Gmina Nowosolna, within Łódź East County, Łódź Voivodeship, in central Poland.
