= Paweł Kucharczyk =

Polish footballer (born 1997)

Personal information
- Full name: Paweł Kucharczyk
- Date of birth: 4 May 1997 (age 29)
- Place of birth: Oława, Poland
- Height: 1.85 m (6 ft 1 in)
- Position: Centre-back

Team information
- Current team: Barycz Sułów
- Number: 6

Youth career
- 2012–2015: FC Wrocław Academy

Senior career*
Years	Team	Apps	(Gls)
2015–2016	FC Wrocław Academy	27	(5)
2016–2017	Ślęza Wrocław	31	(1)
2017–2021	Śląsk Wrocław	1	(0)
2019–2021	Śląsk Wrocław II	77	(7)
2021–2022	Górnik Polkowice	33	(0)
2022–2023	Stal Stalowa Wola	19	(0)
2023–2024	Skra Częstochowa	23	(2)
2024–2025	GKS Jastrzębie	5	(0)
2025–	Barycz Sułów	25	(5)
- * Club domestic league appearances and goals as of 09:00, 26 June 2026 (UTC)

Paweł Kucharczyk (born 4 May 1997) is a Polish professional footballer who plays as a centre-back for III liga club Barycz Sułów.

== Career ==
Kucharczyk began his career with FC Wrocław Academy, who impressed many teams in the youth league with his performances. He had trials with Sandecja Nowy Sącz before joining Ślęza Wrocław for the 2016–17 season. In 2017 Kucharczyk joined Śląsk Wrocław going into the Śląsk reserves, making his Śląsk first team debut in the 2–1 defeat to Pogoń Szczecin, playing the full 90 minutes.

== Honours ==
Śląsk Wrocław II

- III liga, group III: 2019–20
- IV liga Lower Silesia East: 2018–19

Górnik Polkowice

- II liga: 2020–21

Stal Stalowa Wola

- III liga, group IV: 2022–23
- Polish Cup (Subcarpathia regionals): 2022–23
- Polish Cup (Stalowa Wola regionals): 2022–23

Barycz Sułów

- IV liga Lower Silesia: 2025–26
