= Mateusz Oszmaniec =

Polish footballer

Personal information
- Date of birth: 19 July 1988 (age 38)
- Place of birth: Lębork, Poland
- Height: 1.86 m (6 ft 1 in)
- Position: Goalkeeper

Youth career
- Pogoń Lębork
- Debiutant Gdańsk

Senior career*
Years	Team	Apps	(Gls)
2006–2008	Orzeł Trąbki Wielkie		
2008–2019	Bytovia Bytów	146	(0)
- * Club domestic league appearances and goals

Mateusz Oszmaniec (born 19 July 1988) is a Polish former professional footballer who played as a goalkeeper.

== Career ==
In 2008, Oszmaniec signed for Polish fourth tier side Bytovia Bytów, where he made 144 league appearances and scored 0 goals, helping them earn promotion to the Polish fourth tier to the Polish second tier within 6 seasons.

From 2019 to 2024, he was the deputy mayor of Bytów.

== Honours ==
Bytovia Bytów

- III liga Pomerania–West Pomerania: 2010–11
