= Damian Gąska =

Polish footballer

Personal information
- Date of birth: 24 November 1996 (age 29)
- Place of birth: Warsaw, Poland
- Height: 1.76 m (5 ft 9 in)
- Position: Midfielder

Team information
- Current team: Unia Skierniewice
- Number: 52

Youth career
- Polonia Warsaw
- –2012: MKS Polonia Warsaw
- 2013–2014: Varsovia Warsaw

Senior career*
| Years | Team | Apps | (Gls) |
| 2014–2015 | SpVgg Unterhaching | 11 | (1) |
| 2015 | SpVgg Unterhaching II | 2 | (0) |
| 2015–2018 | Wigry Suwałki | 88 | (4) |
| 2018–2021 | Śląsk Wrocław | 47 | (0) |
| 2018–2020 | Śląsk Wrocław II | 6 | (2) |
| 2020–2021 | → Radomiak Radom (loan) | 33 | (3) |
| 2021–2024 | Górnik Łęczna | 85 | (9) |
| 2024–2025 | Warta Poznań | 29 | (0) |
| 2025– | Unia Skierniewice | 21 | (1) |

International career
| 2019 | Poland U21 | 2 | (0) |
- * Club domestic league appearances and goals as of 09:29, 31 May 2026 (UTC)

Damian Gąska (born 24 November 1996) is a Polish professional footballer who plays as a midfielder for I liga club Unia Skierniewice.

== Club career ==
On 7 September 2020, Gąska joined Radomiak Radom on a season-long loan with an option to buy.

== Career statistics ==
As of match played 22 May 2026

Appearances and goals by club, season and competition
| Club | Season | League | | | National cup (Note: Includes Polish Cup) | | Europe | | Other | | Total | |
| Club | Season | Division | Apps | Goals | Apps | Goals | Apps | Goals | Apps | Goals | Apps | Goals |
|---|---|---|---|---|---|---|---|---|---|---|---|---|
| SpVgg Unterhaching | 2014–15 | 3. Liga | 11 | 1 | — | | — | | 0 | 0 | 11 | 1 |
| SpVgg Unterhaching II | 2014–15 | Bayernliga Süd | 2 | 0 | — | | — | | — | | 2 | 0 |
| Wigry Suwałki | 2015–16 | I liga | 26 | 1 | 0 | 0 | — | | — | | 26 | 1 |
| Wigry Suwałki | 2016–17 | I liga | 31 | 2 | 6 | 0 | — | | — | | 37 | 2 |
| Wigry Suwałki | 2017–18 | I liga | 31 | 1 | 1 | 0 | — | | — | | 32 | 1 |
| Wigry Suwałki | Total | | 88 | 4 | 7 | 0 | — | | — | | 95 | 4 |
| Śląsk Wrocław | 2018–19 | Ekstraklasa | 29 | 0 | 3 | 2 | — | | — | | 32 | 2 |
| Śląsk Wrocław | 2019–20 | Ekstraklasa | 18 | 0 | 1 | 0 | — | | — | | 19 | 0 |
| Śląsk Wrocław | 2020–21 | Ekstraklasa | 0 | 0 | 0 | 0 | — | | — | | 0 | 0 |
| Śląsk Wrocław | Total | | 47 | 0 | 4 | 2 | — | | — | | 51 | 2 |
| Śląsk Wrocław II | 2018–19 | IV liga LS West | 2 | 1 | — | | — | | — | | 2 | 1 |
| Śląsk Wrocław II | 2019–20 | III liga, gr. III | 3 | 1 | — | | — | | — | | 3 | 1 |
| Śląsk Wrocław II | 2020–21 | II liga | 1 | 0 | — | | — | | — | | 1 | 0 |
| Śląsk Wrocław II | Total | | 6 | 2 | — | | — | | — | | 6 | 2 |
| Radomiak Radom (loan) | 2020–21 | I liga | 33 | 3 | 2 | 0 | — | | — | | 35 | 3 |
| Górnik Łęczna | 2021–22 | Ekstraklasa | 27 | 5 | 3 | 0 | — | | — | | 30 | 5 |
| Górnik Łęczna | 2022–23 | I liga | 26 | 4 | 3 | 0 | — | | — | | 29 | 4 |
| Górnik Łęczna | 2023–24 | I liga | 31 | 0 | 1 | 0 | — | | 1 (Note: Appearance in I liga promotion play-offs) | 0 | 33 | 0 |
| Górnik Łęczna | Total | | 84 | 9 | 7 | 0 | — | | 1 | 0 | 92 | 9 |
| Warta Poznań | 2024–25 | I liga | 29 | 0 | 2 | 0 | — | | — | | 31 | 0 |
| Unia Skierniewice | 2025–26 | II liga | 21 | 1 | — | | — | | — | | 21 | 1 |
| Career total | | | 321 | 20 | 22 | 2 | 0 | 0 | 1 | 0 | 344 | 22 |

== Honours ==
Śląsk Wrocław II

- III liga, group III: 2019–20
- IV liga Lower Silesia West: 2018–19

Radomiak Radom

- I liga: 2020–21

Unia Skierniewice

- II liga: 2025–26
