= Augusto Loureiro =

Portuguese footballer

Augusto
Personal information
- Full name: Augusto Pereira Loureiro
- Date of birth: 30 August 1987 (age 39)
- Place of birth: Matosinhos, Portugal
- Height: 1.80 m (5 ft 11 in)
- Position: Left-back

Youth career
- 1995–2002: Porto
- 2002–2005: Leixões
- 2005–2006: Infesta

Senior career*
Years	Team	Apps	(Gls)
2006–2009	Infesta	54	(1)
2009	Beira-Mar		
2010–2011	Ribeirão	28	(1)
2011–2013	Moreirense	32	(0)
2013–2016	Créteil	63	(2)
2016–2019	Śląsk Wrocław	51	(2)
Total		228	(6)
- * Club domestic league appearances and goals

Augusto Pereira Loureiro (born 30 August 1987), known simply as Augusto, is a Portuguese former professional footballer who played as a left-back.

== Club career ==
Born in Matosinhos, Augusto played youth football for three clubs, including FC Porto from ages 8 to 15. He spent his first five years as a senior in the lower leagues, with F.C. Infesta and G.D. Ribeirão.

Augusto signed for Segunda Liga side Moreirense F.C. in the summer of 2011, making his debut in the competition on 8 January 2012 by coming on as a late substitute in a 2–0 home win against C.D. Santa Clara. He played 13 games during the season, helping his team to return to the Primeira Liga as runners-up.

Augusto joined US Créteil-Lusitanos from France in 2013, going on to spend three years in Ligue 2. He moved to the Polish Ekstraklasa with Śląsk Wrocław on 24 June 2016, scoring his only goals in top-flight football in victories over KS Cracovia (3–1, at home) and Miedź Legnica (2–0, away), both in the 2018–19 campaign.
