= Daniel Łuczak =

Polish footballer (born 1996)

Personal information
- Full name: Daniel Łuczak
- Date of birth: 12 July 1996 (age 30)
- Place of birth: Wrocław, Poland
- Height: 1.78 m (5 ft 10 in)
- Position: Winger

Team information
- Current team: Polonia Trzebnica
- Number: 10

Youth career
- Śląsk Wrocław

Senior career*
Years	Team	Apps	(Gls)
2013–2019	Śląsk Wrocław II	95	(31)
2016–2017	Śląsk Wrocław	14	(1)
2019–2020	Polonia Trzebnica	11	(3)
2020–2021	Sokół Ostróda	6	(1)
2021	Piast Żmigród	21	(9)
2022–	Polonia Trzebnica	91	(24)
- * Club domestic league appearances and goals as of 14:52, 22 June 2025 (UTC)

Daniel Łuczak (born 12 July 1996) is a Polish professional footballer who plays as a winger for regional league club Polonia Trzebnica.

== Senior career ==
Łuczak's career started at Śląsk Wrocław, playing in the youth sides before making his appearances for the reserve team in 2013. He started training with the first team in 2017. Łuczak made his first appearance for Śląsk's first team coming on a substitute in the final game of the 2016–17 season in a 3–0 win over Wisła Płock. Before getting a first team contract with Śląsk, Łuczak found himself working as a delivery driver for KFC. After three seasons with Śląsk Wrocław and failing to consistently claim a starting position, Łuczak's contract was not renewed in 2019. In total, he played 14 times for Śląsk in the Ekstraklasa, scoring his only Ekstraklasa goal against Arka Gdynia. In August 2019, he joined Polonia Trzebnica in the IV liga.

== Honours ==
Śląsk Wrocław II

- IV liga Lower Silesia East: 2018–19
