= Tomasz Nawotka =

Polish footballer

Personal information
- Date of birth: 14 February 1997 (age 29)
- Place of birth: Olsztyn, Poland
- Height: 1.78 m (5 ft 10 in)
- Positions: Full-back; winger

Team information
- Current team: Świt Nowy Dwór Mazowiecki

Youth career
- Concordia Elbląg
- –2013: Sokół Ostróda

Senior career*
Years	Team	Apps	(Gls)
2013–2014	Sokół Ostróda	21	(0)
2013	→ Concordia Elbląg (loan)	8	(0)
2014–2022	Legia Warsaw II	82	(15)
2014–2022	Legia Warsaw	1	(0)
2017–2018	→ Zagłębie Sosnowiec (loan)	30	(1)
2018	→ Zemplín Michalovce (loan)	7	(1)
2019	→ Zagłębie Sosnowiec (loan)	16	(1)
2019–2020	→ Zagłębie Sosnowiec (loan)	30	(1)
2020–2021	→ ŁKS Łódź (loan)	29	(2)
2022–2026	Sandecja Nowy Sącz	101	(3)
2026–	Świt Nowy Dwór Mazowiecki	0	(0)

International career
2015	Poland U18	6	(0)
2017	Poland U20	2	(0)
- * Club domestic league appearances and goals as of 14:18, 6 June 2026 (UTC)

Tomasz Nawotka (born 14 February 1997) is a Polish professional footballer who plays as a full-back or winger for III liga club Świt Nowy Dwór Mazowiecki.

== Career ==
In 2014, Nawotka joined Legia Warsaw's youth setup to play for their reserve team.

On 11 January 2019, it was announced that Nawotka would join Zagłębie Sosnowiec on loan for the second time from Legia Warsaw.

On 19 August 2020, he joined ŁKS Łódź on loan with an option to buy.

== Honours ==
Sokół Ostróda

- III liga Podlaskie–Warmia-Masuria: 2013–14

Sandecja Nowy Sącz

- III liga, group IV: 2024–25
