= Konrad Poprawa =

Polish association football player

Personal information
- Full name: Konrad Poprawa
- Date of birth: 4 June 1998 (age 28)
- Place of birth: Łódź, Poland
- Height: 1.85 m (6 ft 1 in)
- Position: Centre-back

Youth career
- 2009–2014: GKS Ksawerów

Senior career*
Years	Team	Apps	(Gls)
2014–2016	ŁKS Łódź	1	(0)
2016–2022	Śląsk Wrocław II	71	(2)
2016–2025	Śląsk Wrocław	42	(1)
2018	→ Wigry Suwałki (loan)	0	(0)
2018–2019	→ Skra Częstochowa (loan)	11	(1)
- * Club domestic league appearances and goals as of 14:10, 27 May 2025 (UTC)

Konrad Poprawa (born 4 June 1998) is a Polish professional footballer who plays as a centre-back.

== Football ==
=== Early years ===
Poprawa started playing football in his early years with GKS Ksawerów, Ksawerów being a small village close to the city of his birth, Łódź. He joined GKS in 2009 at the age of 11, staying there until 2014 when he joined ŁKS Łódź. Poprawa played at ŁKS for two seasons playing with the under 19's team. Over the course of these two seasons he made 28 appearances in the Junior Leagues. Poprawa's big move came when he joined Śląsk Wrocław in 2016, who were playing in the top Polish division. In his first season with Śląsk, he played 15 games and scored 4 goals for the under 19's team, while also playing 9 times for the Śląsk second team in the III liga, scoring one goal.

=== Senior career ===
Poprawa's senior debut came in 2017 for the Ekstraklasa game against Wisła Płock, helping the team to a convincing 4-1 win. He made a further two first team appearances for Śląsk in the 2017–18 season, being an unused substitute for the remaining games of the spring round.

For the 2018-19 season, Poprawa joined Wigry Suwałki in the I liga on loan for the season. After failing to get any game time in the first months, the loan was terminated, with Poprawa joining Skra Częstochowa on loan for the rest of the season. Skra played in the II liga for the 2018–19 season, but Poprawa struggled to break into the first team playing only 11 games, the majority of which came after the winter break.

== Honours ==
Śląsk Wrocław II

- III liga, group III: 2019–20
