= Hubert Gostomski =

Polish footballer

Personal information
- Full name: Hubert Gostomski
- Date of birth: 25 February 1998 (age 28)
- Place of birth: Warsaw, Poland
- Height: 1.91 m (6 ft 3 in)
- Position: Goalkeeper

Team information
- Current team: KS Wasilków
- Number: 1

Youth career
- 2010–2014: Polonia Warsaw
- 2015–2016: Jagiellonia Białystok

Senior career*
Years	Team	Apps	(Gls)
2016–2021	Jagiellonia Białystok II	26	(0)
2016–2021	Jagiellonia Białystok	0	(0)
2017–2018	→ Radomiak Radom (loan)	29	(0)
2018	→ Bruk-Bet Termalica (loan)	4	(0)
2018–2019	→ GKS Jastrzębie (loan)	4	(0)
2021–2023	Wissa Szczuczyn	52	(0)
2023	Promień Mońki	17	(0)
2024–	KS Wasilków	59	(0)

International career
2016	Poland U18	2	(0)
2016	Poland U19	6	(0)
- * Club domestic league appearances and goals as of 17:35, 5 June 2026 (UTC)

Hubert Gostomski (born 25 February 1998) is a Polish footballer who plays as a goalkeeper for IV liga Podlasie club KS Wasilków.

== Honours ==
Jagiellonia Białystok II

- IV liga Podlasie: 2019–20

KS Wasilków

- IV liga Podlasie: 2024–25
