= Mateusz Radecki =

Polish association football player

Personal information
- Full name: Mateusz Radecki
- Date of birth: 2 April 1993 (age 33)
- Place of birth: Radom, Poland
- Height: 1.87 m (6 ft 2 in)
- Position: Midfielder

Team information
- Current team: Stal Stalowa Wola
- Number: 7

Youth career
- –2008: Młodzik 18 Radom
- 2008–2011: Widzew Łódź

Senior career*
Years	Team	Apps	(Gls)
2011	→ Radomiak Radom (loan)	22	(2)
2012–2016	Radomiak Radom	121	(10)
2016–2018	Wigry Suwałki	63	(7)
2018–2020	Śląsk Wrocław	31	(4)
2020–2022	Radomiak Radom	40	(5)
2022–2024	GKS Tychy	52	(3)
2024–2025	Puszcza Niepołomice	20	(0)
2025–	Stal Stalowa Wola	30	(1)
- * Club domestic league appearances and goals as of 11:18, 31 May 2026 (UTC)

Mateusz Radecki (born 2 April 1993) is a Polish professional footballer who plays as a midfielder for II liga club Stal Stalowa Wola.

== Senior career ==
Radecki's youth career started at Młodzik 18 Radom, before moving to Widzew Łódź in 2008. For the 2011–12 season, Radecki was loaned to the Radomiak Radom youth team. In 2012, after a successful loan spell, the move was made permanent and Radecki signed his first professional contract. Radecki's career started well with Radomiak, making a claim for a starting position. The 2014–15 season was fraught with injury, and he only managed three appearances in the cup. Despite being out for a full season, Radecki signed a new contract with Radomiak.

In 2016, Radecki signed a two-year contract with Wigry Suwałki, this move saw Radecki playing in I liga for the first time in his career, having previously only played in the third tier with Radomiak. After his contract ran out with Wigry, Radecki joined Śląsk Wrocław signing a two-year contract. Radecki scored his first goal for Śląsk in the 5–0 away win over Miedź Legnica.

On 22 September 2020, he returned to Radomiak Radom.

On 19 July 2022, he moved to I liga side GKS Tychy as a free agent on a two-year contract. On 29 May 2024, it was announced he would leave the club at the end of his contract the following month.

On 27 June 2024, Radecki joined top-flight club Puszcza Niepołomice. He signed a one-year deal, with an option for a further year.

On 12 July 2025, he signed with II liga outfit Stal Stalowa Wola.

== Honours ==
Radomiak Radom

- I liga: 2020–21
- III liga Łódź–Masovian: 2011–12

Śląsk Wrocław II

- III liga, group III: 2019–20
