= Jakub Miszczuk =

Polish footballer

Personal information
- Date of birth: 6 August 1990 (age 36)
- Place of birth: Sokołów Podlaski, Poland
- Height: 1.86 m (6 ft 1 in)
- Position: Goalkeeper

Youth career
- –2006: Salos Sokołów Podlaski
- 2006–2007: KS Piaseczno
- 2007–2008: MSP Szamotuły

Senior career*
Years	Team	Apps	(Gls)
2008–2009	Arka Nowa Sól	40	(0)
2010	Warta Poznań	1	(0)
2010	Śląsk Wrocław	0	(0)
2011	Zagłębie Sosnowiec	9	(0)
2012	Nielba Wągrowiec	11	(0)
2012–2013	Lech Poznań	0	(0)
2013	→ Arka Gdynia (loan)	4	(0)
2013	→ Arka Gdynia II (loan)	3	(0)
2013–2016	Arka Gdynia	26	(0)
2013–2016	Arka Gdynia II	13	(0)
2016–2017	Ruch Chorzów	0	(0)
2017–2018	Stomil Olsztyn	0	(0)
2018–2019	Jagiellonia Białystok	0	(0)
Total		107	(0)
- * Club domestic league appearances and goals

Jakub Miszczuk (born 6 August 1990) is a Polish former professional footballer who played as a goalkeeper.

== Career ==
Miszczuk started his career with Polish III liga side Arka Nowa Sól. In early 2010, he joined Warta Poznań in the Polish second tier. In 2010, Miszczuk moved to top-flight club Śląsk Wrocław. Before the second half of the 2010–11 season, he signed for Zagłębie Sosnowiec in the Polish third tier. In 2012, he joined another Ekstraklasa outfit Lech Poznań.

Before the second half of the 2012–13 season, Miszczuk signed for Arka Gdynia in the Polish second tier, where he made 35 first-team appearances. On 28 March 2013, he debuted for Arka Gdynia during a 3–1 win over Kolejarz Stróże. In 2016, Miszczuk signed for Polish top flight outfit Ruch Chorzów.
