= Oktawian Skrzecz =

Polish footballer (born 1997)

Personal information
- Date of birth: 8 May 1997 (age 29)
- Place of birth: Gdańsk, Poland
- Height: 1.76 m (5 ft 9 in)
- Position: Right winger

Team information
- Current team: Czarni Pruszcz Gdański
- Number: 9

Youth career
- 2003–2013: Lechia Gdańsk
- 2013–2016: Schalke 04

Senior career*
Years	Team	Apps	(Gls)
2016–2017	Schalke 04 II	15	(3)
2017–2018	Śląsk Wrocław	0	(0)
2017–2018	→ GKS Katowice (loan)	24	(0)
2018–2020	Korona Kielce	7	(0)
2019–2020	→ Stomil Olsztyn (loan)	13	(1)
2020–2021	Stal Rzeszów	8	(0)
2021–2024	Bałtyk Gdynia	75	(17)
2024–2025	Cartusia Kartuzy	46	(15)
2026–	Czarni Pruszcz Gdański	14	(6)

International career
2013–2014	Poland U17	13	(2)
2014	Poland U18	2	(0)
2016–2018	Poland U20	8	(0)
- * Club domestic league appearances and goals as of 20:00, 26 June 2026 (UTC)

Oktawian Skrzecz (born 30 May 1997) is a Polish professional footballer who plays as a right winger for IV liga Pomerania club Czarni Pruszcz Gdański.

== Career ==
=== Korona Kielce ===
Skrzecz joined Korona Kielce in the summer 2018. On 2 September 2019 it was confirmed that he had been loaned out to Stomil Olsztyn for the 2019–20 season.

=== Stal Rzeszów ===
On 23 October 2020, he joined Stal Rzeszów.

== Honours ==
Korona Kielce II

- IV liga Świętokrzyskie: 2018–19

Bałtyk Gdynia

- Polish Cup (Pomerania regionals): 2021–22
