= Dariusz Szczerbal =

Polish association football player

Personal information
- Full name: Dariusz Szczerbal
- Date of birth: 2 October 1995 (age 31)
- Place of birth: Leszno, Poland
- Height: 1.90 m (6 ft 3 in)
- Position: Goalkeeper

Team information
- Current team: Polonia Nysa
- Number: 33

Youth career
- –2013: Polonia Leszno

Senior career*
Years	Team	Apps	(Gls)
2013–2016	Polonia Leszno		
2016–2018	Piast Żmigród	54	(0)
2018–2021	Śląsk Wrocław	0	(0)
2019–2021	Śląsk Wrocław II	40	(0)
2021	Elana Toruń	7	(0)
2022	GKS Bełchatów	0	(0)
2022	Arka Gdynia	0	(0)
2022–2023	Polonia Nysa	23	(0)
2023–2025	MKS Kluczbork	40	(0)
2025–	Polonia Nysa	31	(0)
- * Club domestic league appearances and goals as of 19:32, 3 June 2026 (UTC)

Dariusz Szczerbal (born 2 November 1995) is a Polish professional footballer who plays as a goalkeeper for III liga club Polonia Nysa.

== Senior career ==
Szczerbal's career started with Polonia Leszno, with whom he started with the youth team before advancing to the first team in 2013. In 2016, Szczerbal joined Piast Żmigród, where he played 55 times over two seasons. At the beginning of 2018, Szczerbal joined Śląsk Wrocław.

== Honours ==
Śląsk Wrocław II

- III liga, group III: 2019–20
- IV liga Lower Silesia East: 2018–19

MKS Kluczbork

- Polish Cup (Opole regionals): 2023–24
