= Jonatan Straus =

Polish footballer

Personal information
- Date of birth: 30 June 1994 (age 32)
- Place of birth: Nowe Miasto Lubawskie, Poland
- Height: 1.86 m (6 ft 1 in)
- Position: Left-back

Team information
- Current team: Unia Skierniewice
- Number: 3

Youth career
- –2007: Drwęca Nowe Miasto Lubawskie
- 2007–2010: Warmia Olsztyn
- 2010–2013: Jagiellonia Białystok

Senior career*
Years	Team	Apps	(Gls)
2013–2019	Jagiellonia Białystok	46	(0)
2014–2017	Jagiellonia Białystok II	48	(2)
2017–2018	→ Sandecja Nowy Sącz (loan)	4	(0)
2018–2019	→ Wigry Suwałki (loan)	17	(1)
2019–2020	Legionovia Legionowo	19	(1)
2020–2022	Stomil Olsztyn	69	(6)
2022–2024	Radunia Stężyca	60	(1)
2024–2025	Świt Szczecin	24	(3)
2025–	Unia Skierniewice	33	(2)

International career
2013–2015	Poland U20	9	(1)
2015	Poland U21	3	(0)
- * Club domestic league appearances and goals as of 09:28, 31 May 2026 (UTC)

Jonatan Straus (born 30 June 1994) is a Polish professional footballer who plays as a left-back for I liga club Unia Skierniewice.

== Career ==
Straus left Jagiellonia Białystok at the end of the 2018–19 season. At the end of July 2019, he signed with Legionovia Legionowo. Six months later, Straus moved to I liga club Stomil Olsztyn.

On 20 June 2022, he left Stomil by mutual consent to join II liga side Radunia Stężyca. After making 60 league appearances for the club across two years, he left the club at the end of the 2023–24 season.

On 2 July 2024, Straus joined II liga newcomers Świt Szczecin on a two-year deal. Exactly a year later, he left the club by mutual consent.

On 9 July 2025, Straus signed with freshly promoted third tier side Unia Skierniewice.

== Career statistics ==
As of match played 30 May 2026

Appearances and goals by club, season and competition
Club	Season	League			Polish Cup		Other		Total	
Club	Season	Division	Apps	Goals	Apps	Goals	Apps	Goals	Apps	Goals
Jagiellonia Białystok	2012–13	Ekstraklasa	4	0	0	0	—		4	0
Jagiellonia Białystok	2013–14	Ekstraklasa	13	0	1	0	—		14	0
Jagiellonia Białystok	2014–15	Ekstraklasa	16	0	0	0	—		16	0
Jagiellonia Białystok	2015–16	Ekstraklasa	8	0	2	0	0	0	10	0
Jagiellonia Białystok	2016–17	Ekstraklasa	5	0	1	0	—		6	0
Jagiellonia Białystok	Total		46	0	4	0	0	0	50	0
Jagiellonia Białystok II	2013–14	III liga, gr. B	3	0	—		—		3	0
Jagiellonia Białystok II	2014–15	III liga, gr. B	11	0	—		—		11	0
Jagiellonia Białystok II	2015–16	III liga, gr. B	12	0	—		—		12	0
Jagiellonia Białystok II	2016–17	III liga, gr. B	22	2	—		—		22	2
Jagiellonia Białystok II	Total		48	2	—		—		48	2
Sandecja Nowy Sącz (loan)	2017–18	Ekstraklasa	4	0	3	0	—		7	0
Wigry Suwałki (loan)	2018–19	I liga	17	1	0	0	—		17	1
Legionovia Legionowo	2019–20	II liga	19	1	0	0	—		19	1
Stomil Olsztyn	2019–20	I liga	12	0	—		—		12	0
Stomil Olsztyn	2020–21	I liga	26	2	0	0	—		26	2
Stomil Olsztyn	2021–22	I liga	31	4	2	0	—		33	4
Stomil Olsztyn	Total		69	6	2	0	—		71	6
Radunia Stężyca	2022–23	II liga	28	1	3	0	—		31	1
Radunia Stężyca	2023–24	II liga	32	0	2	0	—		34	0
Radunia Stężyca	Total		60	1	5	0	—		65	1
Świt Szczecin	2024–25	II liga	23	3	1	0	1 (Note: Appearance in II liga promotion play-offs)	0	25	3
Unia Skierniewice	2025–26	II liga	33	2	—		—		33	2
Career total			319	16	15	0	1	0	335	16

== Honours ==
Unia Skierniewice

- II liga: 2025–26
