= Poland at the 2008 UEFA European Championship =

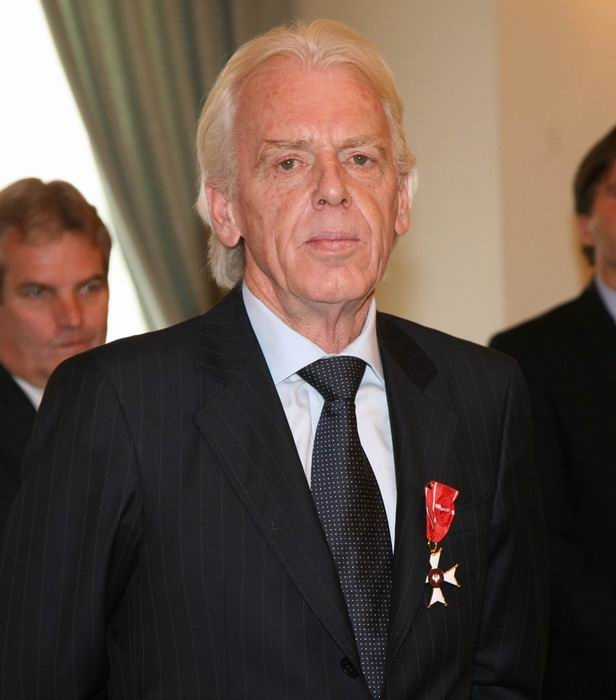
Dutchman Leo Beenhakker was the head coach of the Poland national football team during the qualifiers and the UEFA European Championship. For securing qualification to the tournament, he was awarded the Officer's Cross of the Order of Polonia Restituta by the President of Poland, Lech Kaczyński

Poland at the 2008 UEFA European Championship was the first-ever appearance of Poland national football team in the UEFA European Championship.

The Poland national football team qualified for the UEFA Euro 2008 in Austria and Switzerland by finishing first in qualifying Group A, ahead of teams such as Portugal. In the tournament, Poland was placed in Group B, where they lost 0–2 to Germany in their first match. In the second match, they drew 1–1 with the host nation Austria, with a goal scored by Roger Guerreiro. In the final group match, Poland was defeated 0–1 by Croatia. Finishing last in the group with one point, Poland was eliminated from further competition.

== Qualifications and preparations ==
In 2006, the Poland national football team participated in the 2006 FIFA World Cup in Germany, where they were eliminated in the group stage. After the tournament, there was a change in the head coach position – Paweł Janas was replaced by the Dutchman Leo Beenhakker. Under his leadership, the Poles played for the first time on 16 August 2006 in Odense, losing 0–2 to Denmark.

=== Qualifications ===
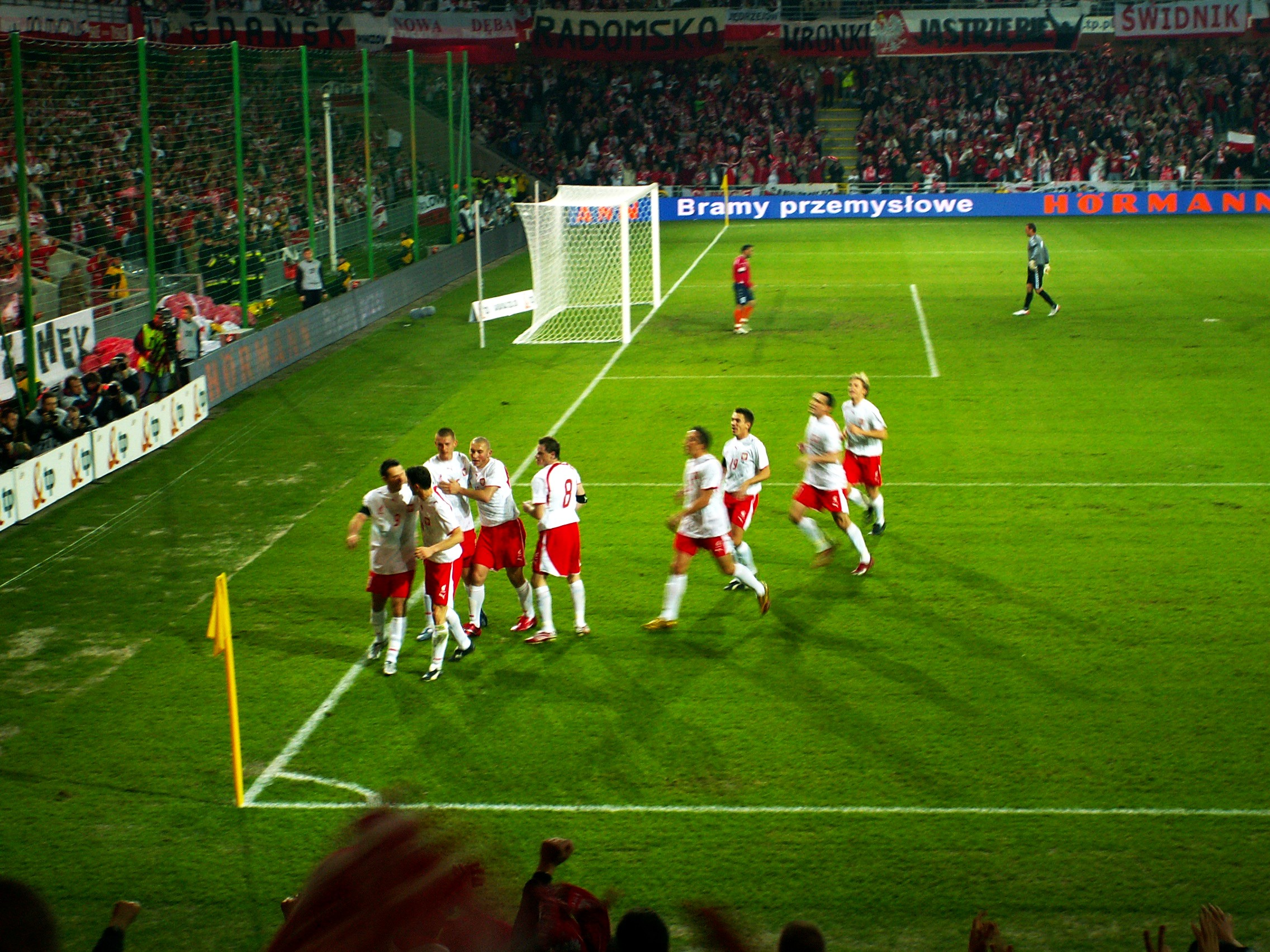
Polish players celebrating after Maciej Żurawski scored a goal during the EURO qualification match against Armenia at the Kielce Stadium

On 2 September 2006, the Poland national football team began the qualifications for the UEFA European Championship. In Bydgoszcz, they faced Finland, losing 1–3. The media described the Poles' performance as terrible and embarrassing. Four days later, in a better style, Poland drew 1–1 with Serbia, with a goal from outside the penalty area scored by Radosław Matusiak. In the next match – against Kazakhstan – the Poles secured their first victory, but their play was clumsy and nervous.

A breakthrough occurred on 11 October 2006. On that day, the Poland national football team faced Portugal at the Silesian Stadium in Chorzów. After two goals by Euzebiusz Smolarek, Poland won 2–1. This victory started a series of four consecutive wins: against Belgium, Azerbaijan, Armenia, and Azerbaijan again. A loss in the away match against Armenia turned out to be a small loss, as Poland then drew 2–2 with Portugal. Futbol magazine listed both qualifying matches against Portugal as ones that Polish fans cannot forget.

In September 2007, Poland drew 0:0 with Finland, and in October they defeated Kazakhstan 3–1. On November 17, they won at the Silesian Stadium against Belgium after two goals by Euzebiusz Smolarek, qualifying for the UEFA European Championship finals for the first time in history. Poland concluded the qualifications with a draw against Serbia and finished first in the group with eight wins, four draws, and two losses.

Poland's matches in the EURO 2008 qualifiers
Date	Opponent	W-D-L	Result	City	Goal scorers
2 September 2006	Finland	L	1–3	Bydgoszcz	Łukasz Garguła
6 September 2006	Serbia	D	1–1	Warsaw	Radosław Matusiak
10 October 2006	Kazakhstan	W	0–1	Almaty	Euzebiusz Smolarek
11 October 2006	Portugal	W	2–1	Chorzów	Euzebiusz Smolarek (2)
15 November 2006	Belgium	W	0–1	Brussels	Radosław Matusiak
24 March 2007	Azerbaijan	W	5–0	Warsaw	Jacek BąkDariusz Dudka Wojciech Łobodziński Jacek Krzynówek Przemysław Kaźmierczak
28 March 2007	Armenia	W	1–0	Kielce	Maciej Żurawski
2 June 2007	Azerbaijan	W	1–3	Baku	Euzebiusz Smolarek Jacek Krzynówek (2)
6 June 2007	Armenia	L	1–0	Yerevan
8 September 2007	Portugal	D	2–2	Lisbon	Mariusz Lewandowski Jacek Krzynówek
12 September 2007	Finland	D	0–0	Helsinki
13 October 2007	Kazakhstan	W	3–1	Warsaw	Euzebiusz Smolarek (3)
17 November 2007	Belgium	W	2–0	Chorzów	Euzebiusz Smolarek (2)
21 November 2007	Serbia	D	2–2	Belgrade	Rafał Murawski Radosław Matusiak

=== 2008 ===
Poland began 2008 with a 1–0 victory over Finland (with only players from the Polish league in this match), and then they defeated the Czech Republic 2–0 (the team mainly consisted of players from foreign leagues). At the end of February, with a squad mostly composed of players from the Orange Ekstraklasa, they won 2–0 against Estonia in Wronki (goals by Radosław Matusiak and Tomasz Zahorski).

On March 26, the Poland national football team lost 0–3 to the United States at the Henryk Reyman Stadium in Kraków. After the match, coach Leo Beenhakker commented on the game and the state of Poland's preparations for the UEFA European Championships:

Today's result should not significantly impact our preparations for the UEFA European Championship. We played terribly in the first half, but our game improved after the break. This was just a friendly match. We lost, and it hurts; I admit it first. But don't think our level has dropped to zero or that we're back to square one. I also called for restraint in euphoria after winning against the Czech Republic. We are still preparing for the big tournament; we are on our way. Therefore, we should not draw dramatic conclusions. After this match, we are better prepared for the Euro. We know that winning at this level will not come easy. There are two positives: we know we need all players in optimal form to win. And we had another opportunity to test players. Some players lost their chance for the Euro with this match, but I will not talk about them. The interested parties will know first.

From May 19 to 31, the Poland national football team held a training camp in Donaueschingen, Germany. It was supposed to be the camp where coach Leo Beenhakker was finally expected to leave his mark as a great coach on a team considered very average. During the camp, the team played three matches – the first, a friendly match against FC Schaffhausen, winning 1–0 with a goal by Jacek Krzynówek. The second, a friendly match against Macedonia, mostly featuring reserve players, ended in a 1–1 draw. The last match was against Albania, where Poland won 1–0 with a goal scored by Maciej Żurawski.

The team returned to Poland and on June 1, drawing 1–1 with Denmark at the Silesian Stadium.

== Championships ==
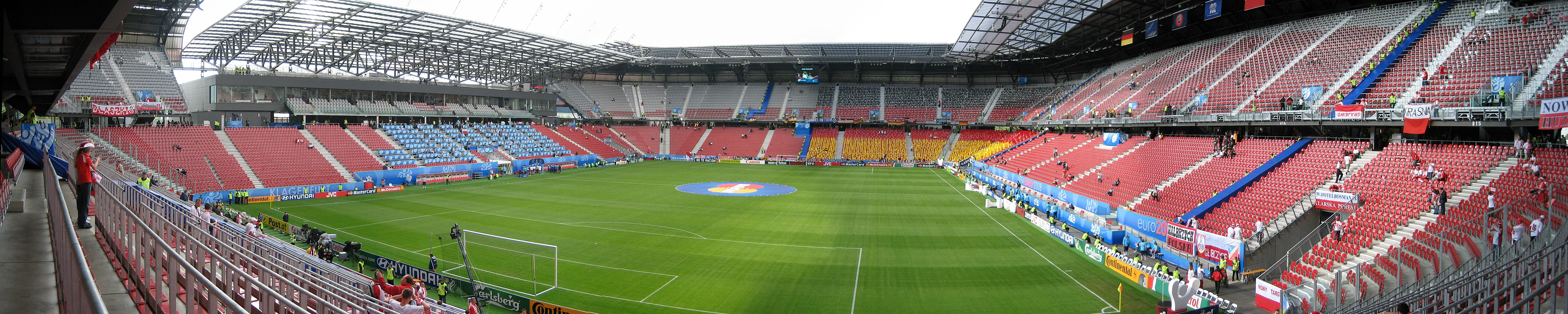
Panoramic view of the Wörthersee Stadion in Klagenfurt before Poland's match against Germany. Poland also played against Croatia at this stadium. The match against Austria took place at the Ernst-Happel-Stadion in Vienna

As a result of the draw held on 2 December 2007 in Lucerne, the Poland national football team was placed in Group B along with Germany, Austria, and Croatia. Among Polish fans, there was a prevailing belief that the national team would initially lose to its western neighbor, then defeat the tournament host, and that the match against Croatia would determine the final standings. Euzebiusz Smolarek was considered the leader and star of the team, although according to foreign journalists, goalkeeper Artur Boruc was more deserving of the latter title.

=== Squad ===
Leo Beenhakker announced the Poland national football team squad for the championships in Austria and Switzerland on 28 May 2008 at a specially convened press conference. The squad included 23 players – 14 from foreign clubs and 9 from Polish teams. Notably absent was Radosław Matusiak, who debuted under Beenhakker's tenure and regularly played in national team matches from 2006 to 2008, scoring seven goals. Roger Guerreiro, who received Polish citizenship on 17 April 2008, was included in the squad.

On June 5, Jakub Błaszczykowski suffered a recurrence of a hamstring injury during training. Tests showed that he would be unable to train or play for several weeks. As a result, Łukasz Piszczek, who was on vacation with his fiancée on the Greek island of Rhodes, was called up to replace him. Beenhakker admitted that he had planned to start Błaszczykowski in the match against Germany.

On June 6, Tomasz Kuszczak fell and bruised his gluteal muscle during training. He was taken to the hospital for an MRI. The injury turned out to be more severe than initially thought. Doctors at the clinic in Graz announced that the goalkeeper would be sidelined for two to three weeks, leading to the call-up of Wojciech Kowalewski from Korona Kielce in his place.

Number	Name	Age	Caps	Goals	Club
Goalkeepers
1	Artur Boruc	28	34	0	Celtic F.C.
12	Wojciech Kowalewski	31	10	0	Korona Kielce
22	Łukasz Fabiański	23	8	0	Arsenal
Defenders
2	Mariusz Jop	30	24	0	FC Moscow
3	Jakub Wawrzyniak	25	11	0	Legia Warsaw
4	Paweł Golański	26	10	1	FCSB
6	Jacek Bąk	35	94	3	FK Austria Wien
13	Marcin Wasilewski	28	27	1	RSC Anderlecht
14	Michał Żewłakow	32	76	2	Olympiacos
23	Adam Kokoszka	22	7	2	Wisła Kraków
Midfielders
5	Dariusz Dudka	25	26	2	Wisła Kraków
8	Jacek Krzynówek	32	79	15	VfL Wolfsburg
10	Łukasz Garguła	27	12	1	GKS Bełchatów
15	Michał Pazdan	21	5	0	Górnik Zabrze
16	Łukasz Piszczek	23	3	1	Hertha BSC
17	Wojciech Łobodziński	26	16	2	Wisła Kraków
18	Mariusz Lewandowski	29	47	3	FC Shakhtar Donetsk
19	Rafał Murawski	27	9	1	Lech Poznań
20	Roger Guerreiro	26	2	0	Legia Warsaw
Forwards
7	Euzebiusz Smolarek	27	31	13	Racing Santander
9	Maciej Żurawski	32	71	17	AEL
11	Marek Saganowski	30	23	3	Southampton
21	Tomasz Zahorski	24	9	1	Górnik Zabrze
Sources					

Poland national football team squad for Euro 2008

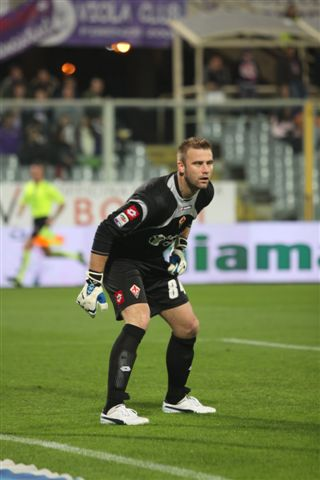
Artur Boruc

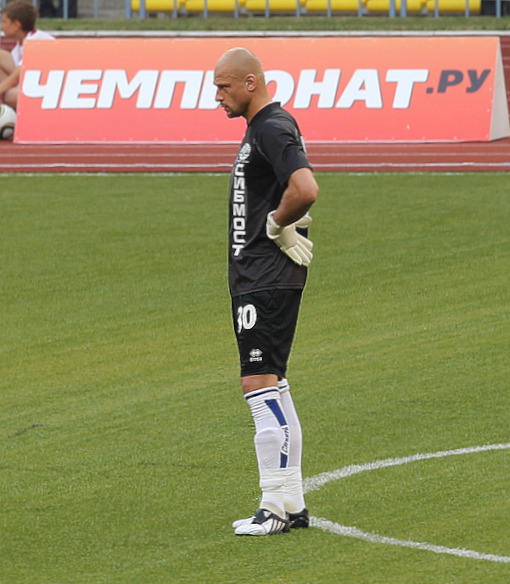
Wojciech Kowalewski

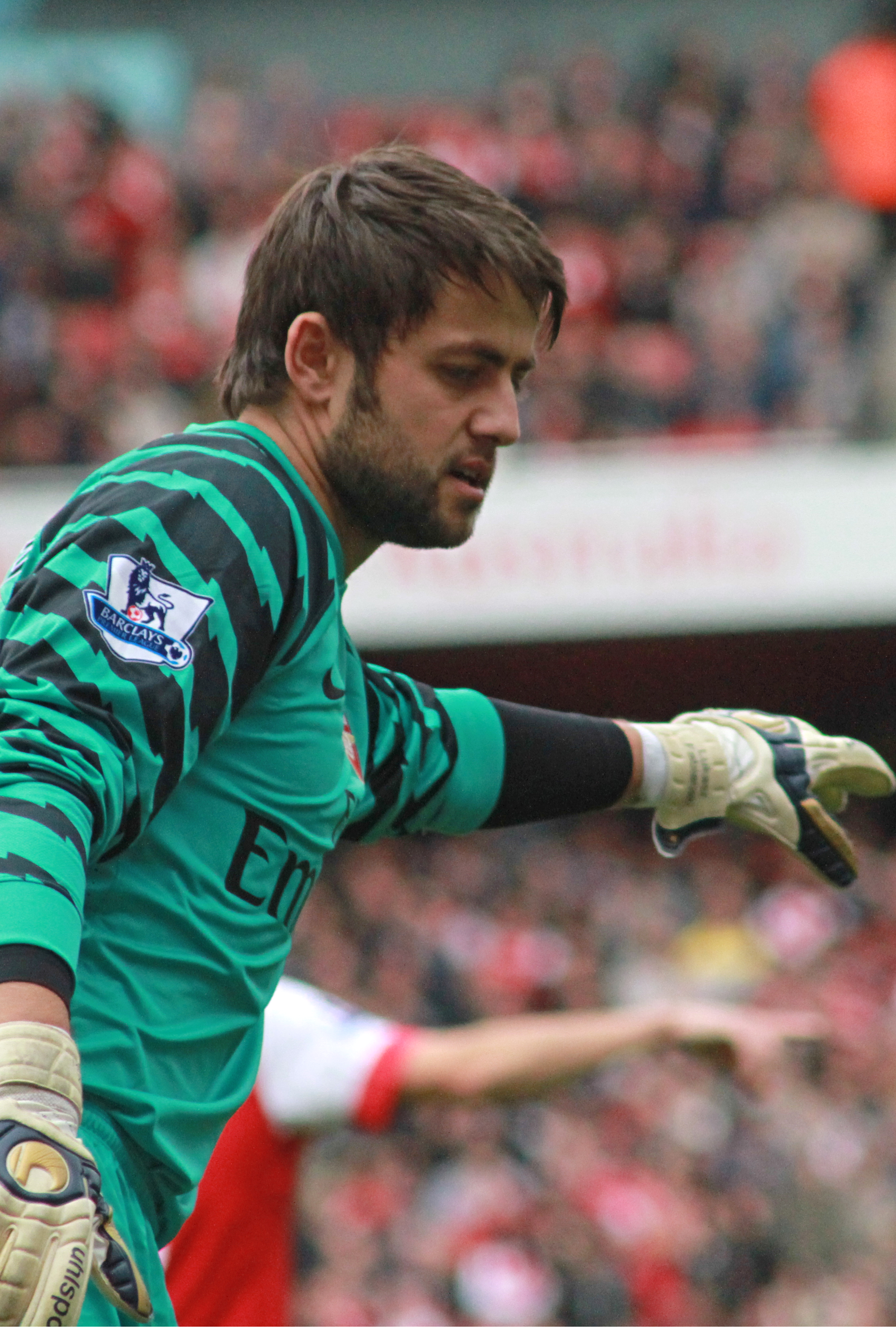
Łukasz Fabiański

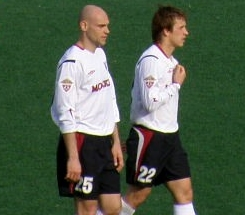
Mariusz Jop (on the left)

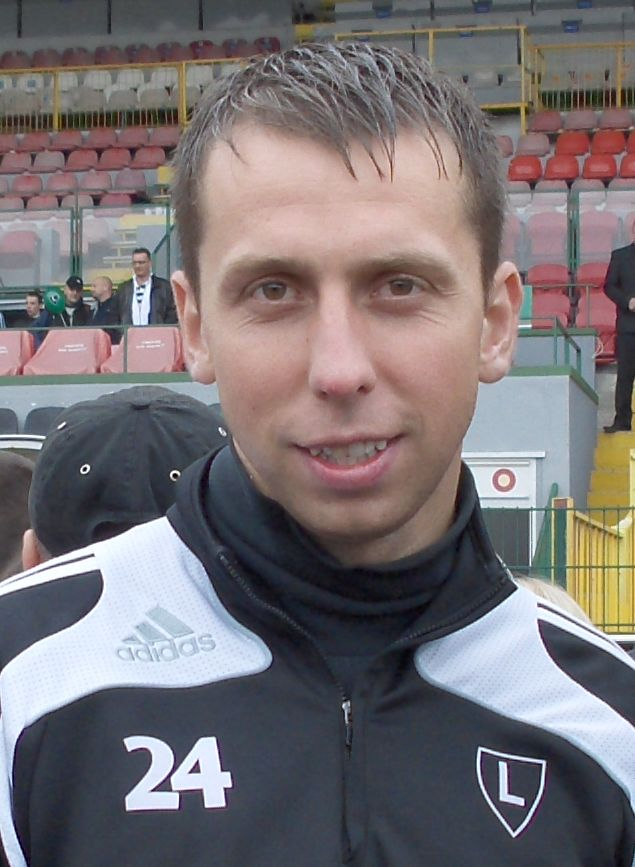
Jakub Wawrzyniak

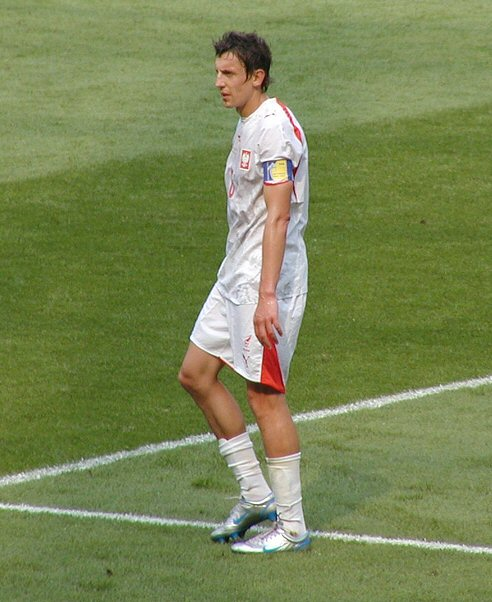
Jacek Bąk

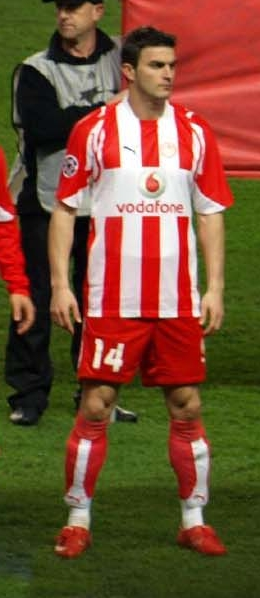
Michał Żewłakow

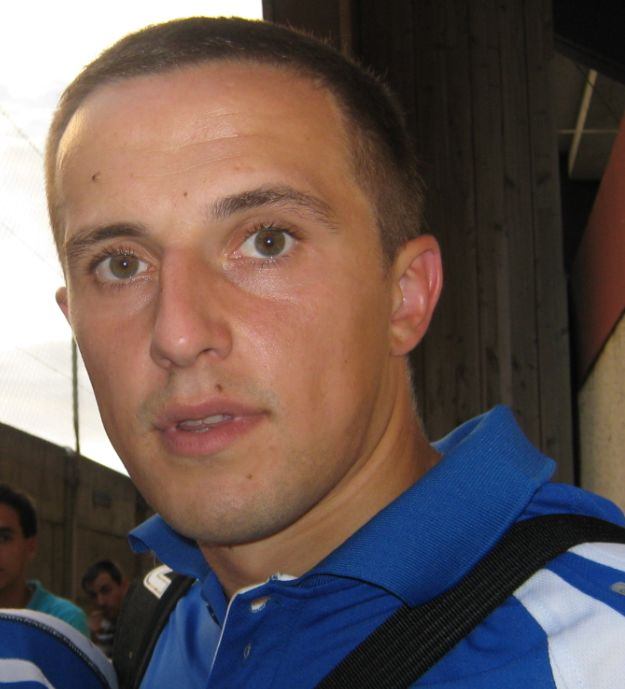
Dariusz Dudka

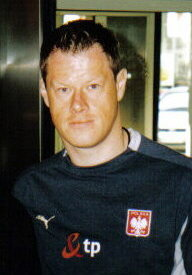
Jacek Krzynówek

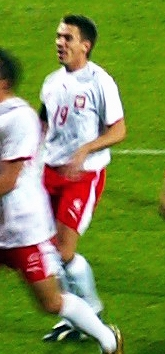
Łukasz Garguła

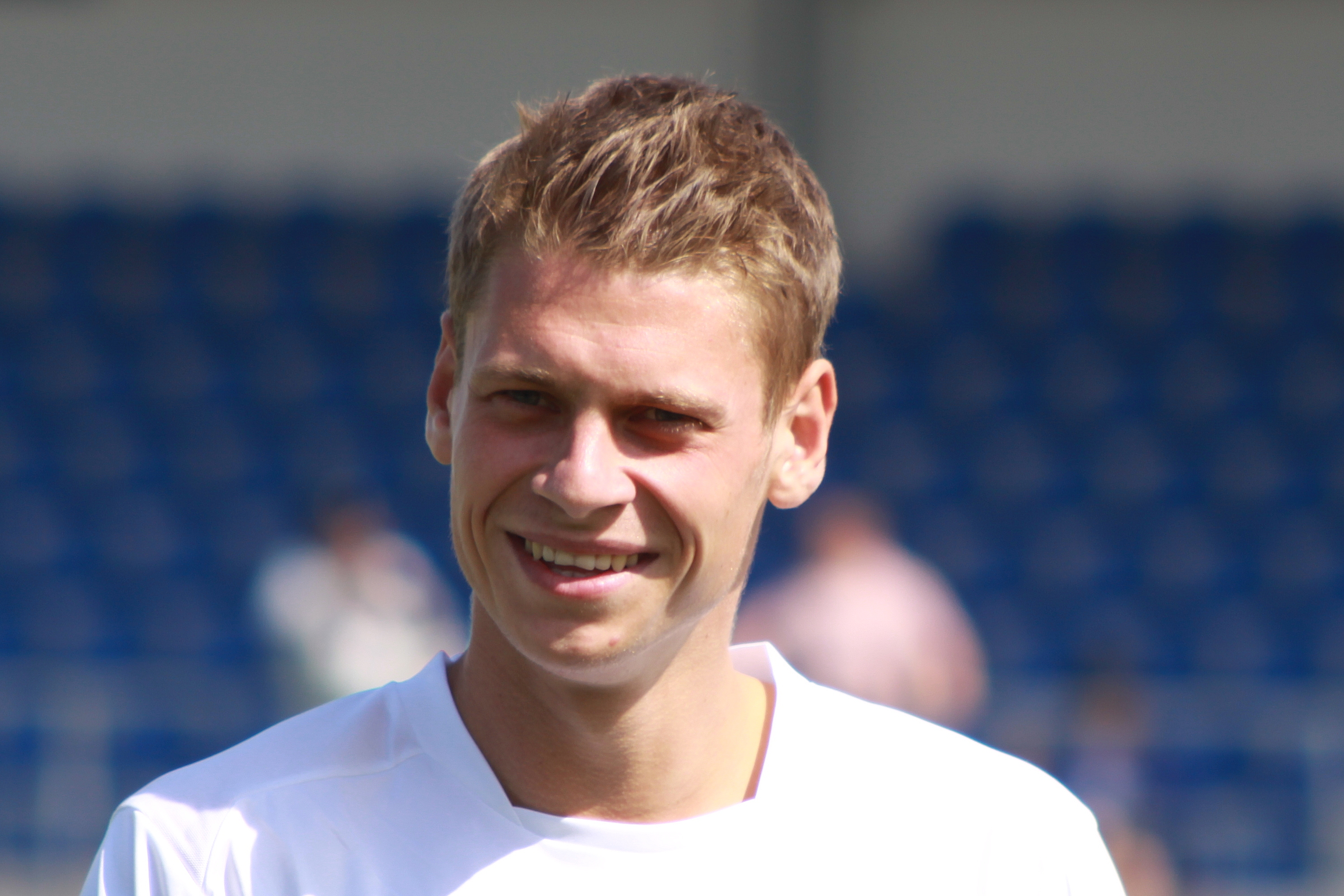
Łukasz Piszczek

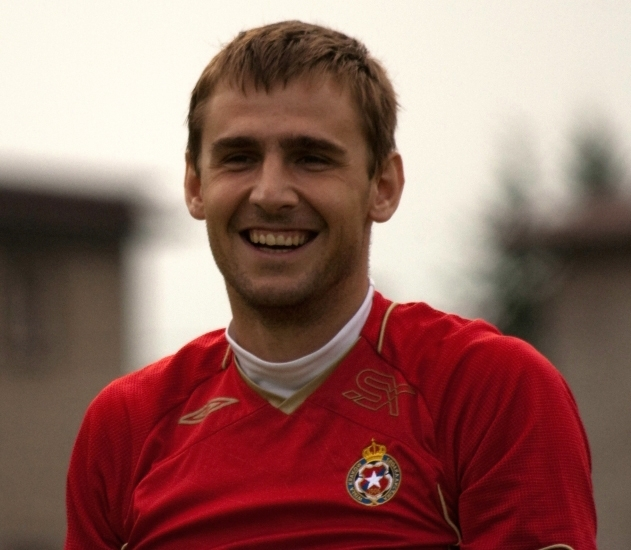
Wojciech Łobodziński

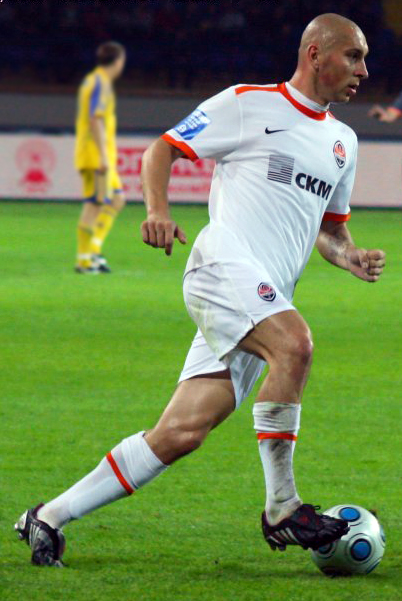
Mariusz Lewandowski

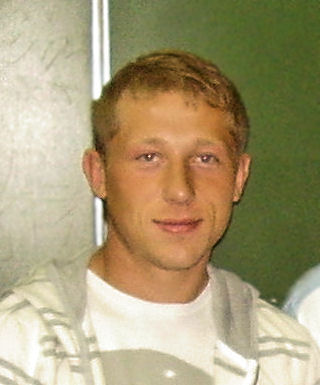
Rafał Murawski

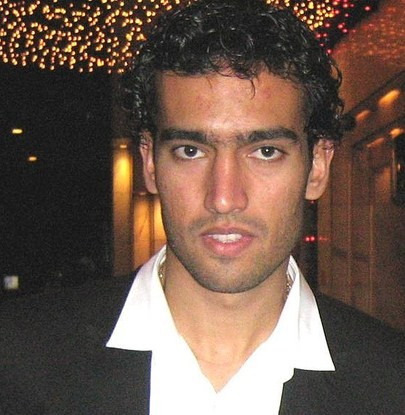
Roger Guerreiro

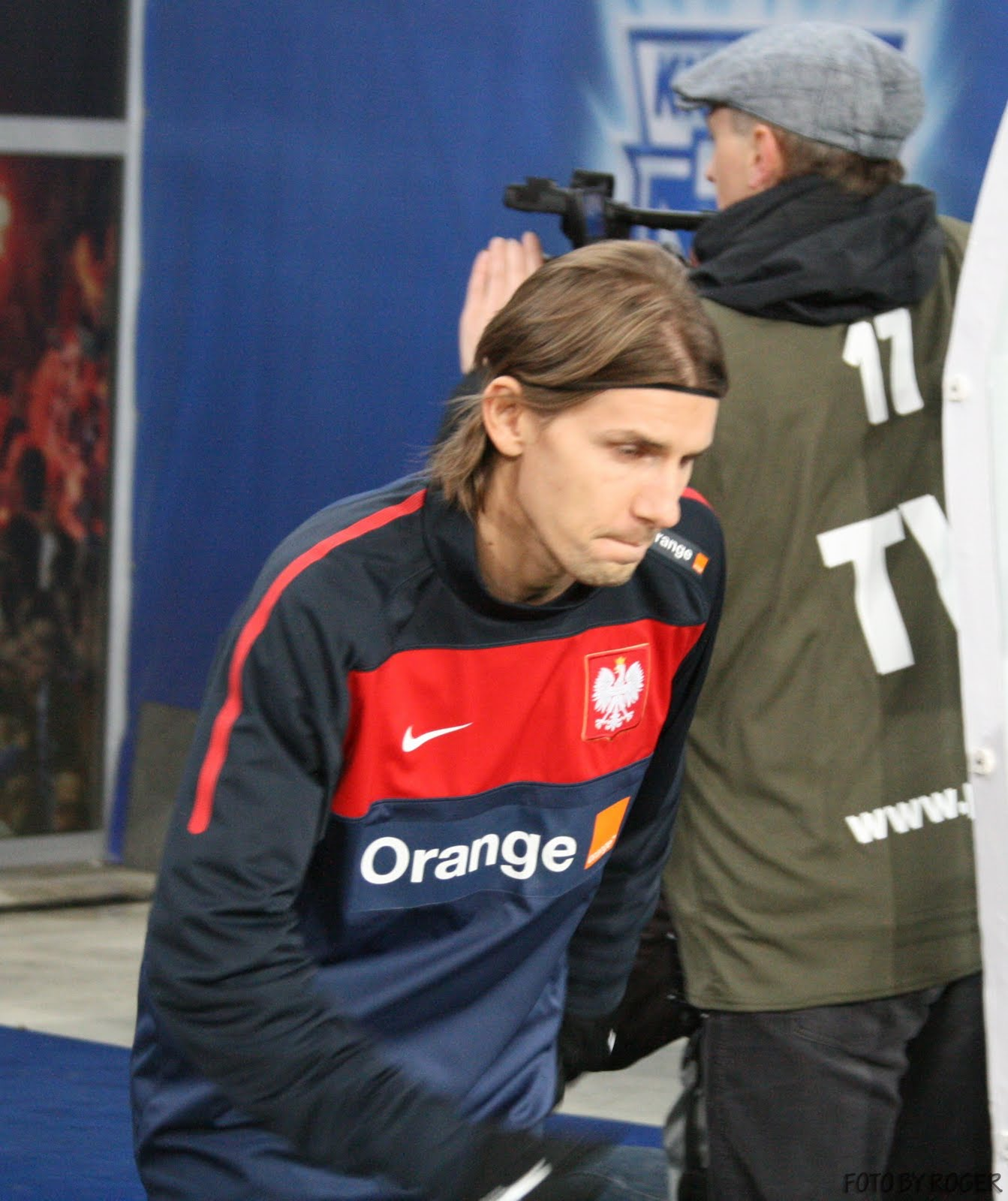
Euzebiusz Smolarek

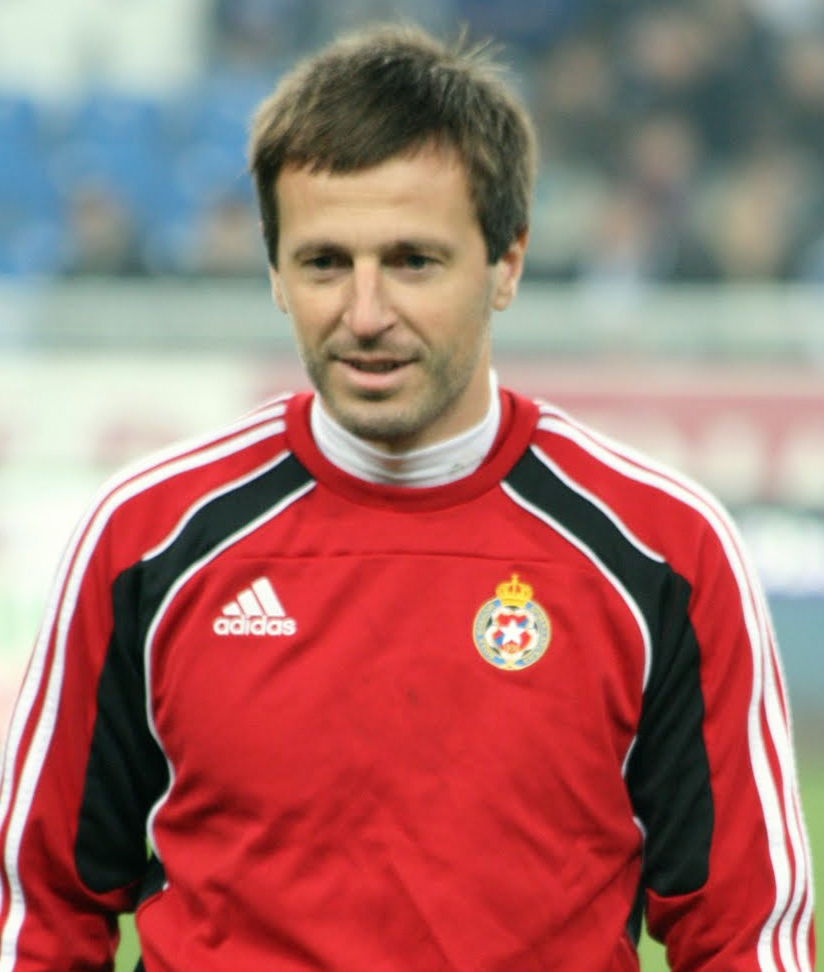
Maciej Żurawski

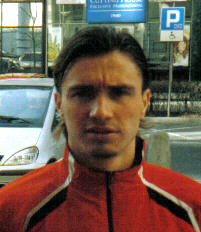
Marek Saganowski

=== Training camp in Austria ===
The Poland national football team arrived in Austria on June 2, landing at Graz Airport and traveling to Bad Waltersdorf. In Austria, they moved around in a distinctive bus decorated in national colors with the slogan: Because sport and fun matter. The slogans for each team were chosen by fans who voted on the UEFA website. The entire national team's staff was provided with special cars from the championship sponsor and security for the players. The first training session started on Tuesday, June 3, with 13 players and 3 goalkeepers participating. The training focused on sprints with dribbling elements, pressing play, and quickly transitioning actions to the other side. On June 11, the team moved to Vienna for two days to play a match against Austria.

The base for the Polish team during the championships was the Der Steirerhof Hotel in Bad Waltersdorf, isolated from nearby buildings, and recommended to Leo Beenhakker by Arsène Wenger. Despite preparing for the group matches in the presence of other hotel guests, a photography ban was enforced on the entire property to ensure some privacy for the players. The players, who occupied an entire floor of one of the three buildings, had access to six pools, including thermal pools, vending machines, and table tennis.

During the training camp, coach Leo Beenhakker claimed that the team was improving day by day. He spoke highly of Maciej Żurawski: When I see Żurawski working hard in training, I can't believe it. Incredible, this guy seems to be experiencing a second youth. Before the championships, Beenhakker believed that the team was a real, cohesive unit, despite lacking big stars. He also claimed that the Polish players' strength lay in their strong psyche, although he noted that the process to achieve this had been long. Western observers emphasized that the play of the Poland national football team had significantly changed under the Dutch coach.

Before the championships, Polish players consistently claimed that the team had a great atmosphere. This atmosphere was not even spoiled by clashes between the German and Polish press, which published military caricatures, referred to history, and claimed that the Germans had reached an agreement with the Austrians to eliminate Poland and Croatia from the tournament. Observers who had been in Bad Waltersdorf since the beginning of the camp noted that the players seemed relaxed and confident.

In the UEFA European Championships in Austria and Switzerland, the Polish players wore Puma v1.08 kits, similar to those of Austria, the Czech Republic, Switzerland, and Italy. This collection was a modification of the v1.06 collection, which the Poles wore during the 2006 FIFA World Cup in Germany. The shirts weighed 145 grams, and the manufacturer, after conducting tests at the University of Manchester, showed that the kit reduced air resistance during movement.

=== Match Germany–Poland ===
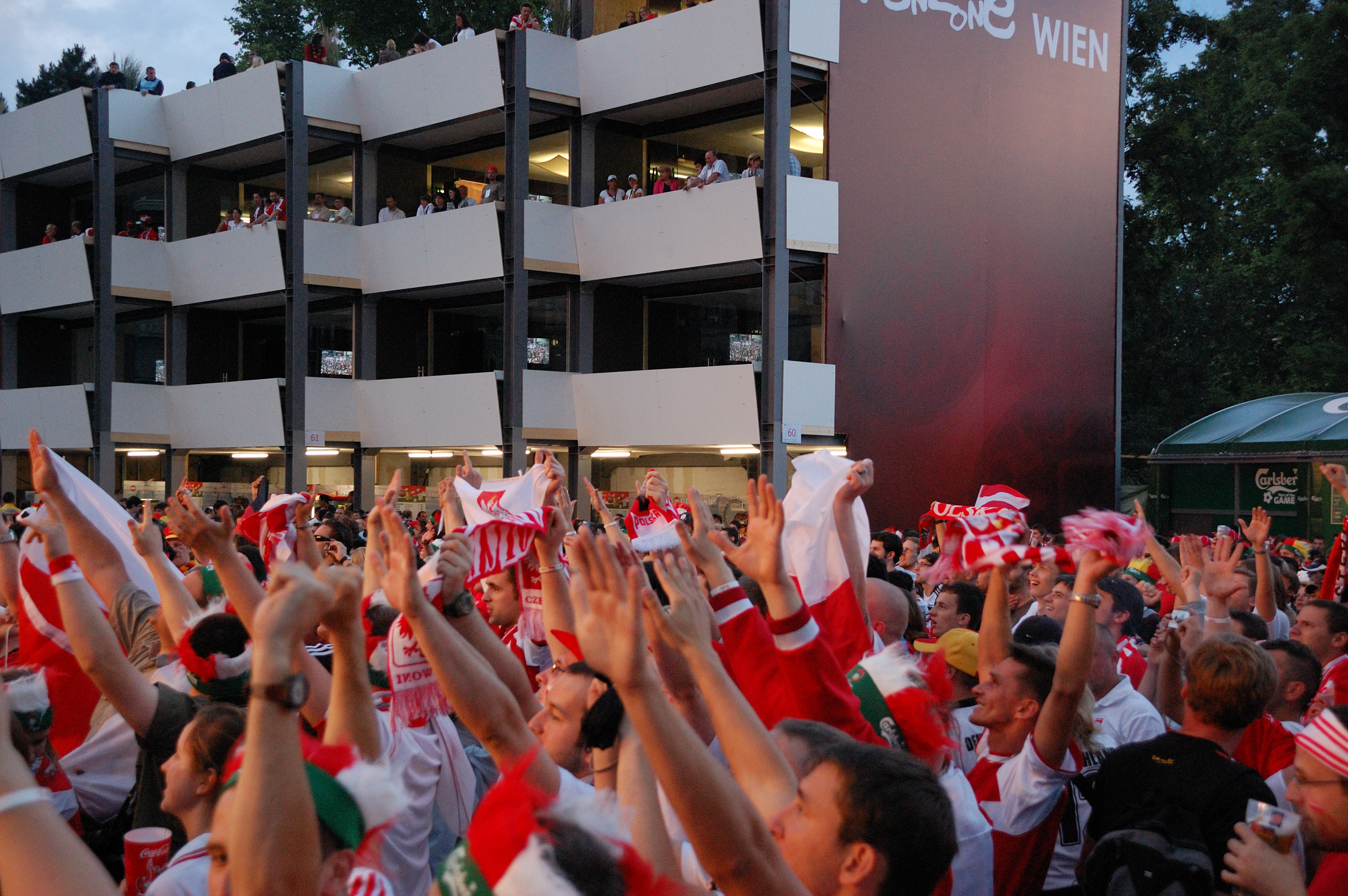
Poland national football team fans in the fan zone in Vienna during the Germany–Poland match

Germany–Poland

The Poland national football team began their group stage matches with a game against Germany. Coach Leo Beenhakker made no surprising changes to the starting lineup compared to the friendly matches, except for a tactical switch – Euzebiusz Smolarek played as the forward instead of the expected Maciej Żurawski. At the beginning of the match, the Polish team was dominant – Jacek Krzynówek missed a good chance to score in the first minute. The Polish defenders struggled with setting offside traps. As the game progressed, it evened out, and the Germans took the initiative, culminating in a goal by Lukas Podolski. Towards the end of the first half, the Polish players attacked again. Mariusz Lewandowski and Wojciech Łobodziński performed well, while Euzebiusz Smolarek and captain Maciej Żurawski, who missed the best chance to equalize, did not.

At the beginning of the second half, Roger Guerreiro came on for Maciej Żurawski, bringing much-needed vitality to the Polish team's play. In the 63rd minute, Euzebiusz Smolarek scored an equalizing goal, but it was disallowed as he was offside. Despite the initial advantage of the Polish players, the Germans scored a second goal – Lukas Podolski again in the 72nd minute. A significant error by left-back Paweł Golański, who lost the ball to Bastian Schweinsteiger in the penalty area, contributed to this goal. The match ended with a 2–0 victory for Germany. In the other Group B match, Croatia defeated Austria 1–0.

For the offensive play against Germany, Euzebiusz Smolarek, Maciej Żurawski, and Jacek Krzynówek were primarily responsible. However, their cooperation did not meet the coach's expectations. Krzynówek spoiled several counterattacks with poor ball control. The wing players' cooperation with the full-backs was also unsatisfactory. The Germans surprised the Polish players with well-prepared game schemes – frequently switching positions, making offside traps ineffective. In the second half, Marek Saganowski replaced Paweł Golański, starting to create attacks with Euzebiusz Smolarek. Saganowski's introduction moved Jacek Krzynówek to left-back.

After the match, coach Leo Beenhakker commented:

We are disappointed. We started the match well and wanted to set the pace, but it was not easy against a high-level opponent. We had our chances and dominated until the second goal. The last 20 minutes can be forgotten. Maciej Żurawski left because he was not fit to play the entire match. I think Roger replaced him well and showed his talent. We have a decent team, but unlike Germany, we don't have many players who can change the course of the game. I congratulated my players as they gave their all.

8 June 2008
20:45 CET

Germany	2–0	Poland
Podolski 20' 72'

Wörthersee Stadion
Attendance: 30,461
Referee: Tom Henning Øvrebø

=== Match Austria–Poland ===
Austria–Poland

In the match against Germany, Maciej Żurawski sustained a quadriceps injury, sidelining him for the rest of the tournament. However, he stayed with the team, explaining that he was the captain of the national team. As a result, experienced player Jacek Bąk was appointed the new captain. In the second group match, played at Ernst-Happel-Stadion in Vienna, Poland faced the tournament hosts – Austria. Mariusz Lewandowski, who had twisted his ankle and bruised his shin against Germany, started from the first minute. The match began with quick and decisive attacks from the Austrians. Artur Boruc performed well, preventing Poland from conceding a goal – saving a difficult shot from Andreas Ivanschitz in the 10th minute, followed by two strikes from Martin Harnik. Later, he saved a one-on-one situation against Christoph Leitgeb and stopped a shot from György Garics in the 20th minute. He flawlessly caught crosses and skillfully restarted the game, initiating counterattacks.

In the 30th minute, Poland took the lead – Marek Saganowski, after bypassing an Austrian defender, took a shot that was parried by the goalkeeper. The ball fell to Roger, who easily scored. In the second half, the initiative belonged to Poland. First, after a pass from Roger, Euzebiusz Smolarek found himself in a scoring position, and in the 63rd minute, Jacek Bąk missed a good chance, with Jürgen Macho making an instinctive save. In the 93rd minute, referee Howard Webb awarded a penalty to Austria for a foul by Mariusz Lewandowski on Sebastian Prödl. Ivica Vastić converted it, and the match ended in a 1–1 draw. In the other Group B match, Croatia defeated Germany 2–1.

Poland started the match without a classic right midfielder – Marcin Wasilewski was supposed to fulfill this role, supported by Mariusz Lewandowski and Dariusz Dudka. Jacek Krzynówek (playing on the left but occasionally moving to the center), Euzebiusz Smolarek (as the forward), and Roger (as the "free electron") were mainly responsible for the offensive play. Smolarek was supported by Marek Saganowski, with both players switching positions, which led to Poland's goal. After the break, Paweł Golański replaced Mariusz Jop, taking the left-back position, while Michał Żewłakow moved to the center of the defense.

The penalty awarded in the match against Austria caused much controversy. Howard Webb's decision was criticized by figures such as Grzegorz Lato, who said: It's unthinkable that such a penalty was given by an English referee. If he officiated like that in his league, there would be 15 penalties in every match. I am very surprised because in England, shoving, pulling, and holding in the 16-meter box are commonplace. Many threats and insults against the referee appeared online. President Lech Kaczyński and Prime Minister Donald Tusk, who were present at the match, also expressed their outrage. UEFA also issued a statement supporting the referee's decision. Former national team coach Wojciech Łazarek, in an interview with Przegląd Sportowy, admitted that the Polish team's players were also at fault: At the national level, in such an important event, you can't let yourself be provoked in the final minutes of the match.

Coach Leo Beenhakker also commented on the match and the referee's performance:

In my opinion, there should not have been a penalty. Before the tournament started, UEFA provided each team staff with guidelines on what would be whistled and what wouldn't. There was an hour-long briefing showing exactly such scrambles in the penalty area. From the beginning of the tournament, I saw constant wrestling in the penalty area in every match, and there was no penalty. Today, the referee saw something special. For me, it was strange, also the decision to repeat the free kick for the Austrians. At the moment, we are out of the championship. We can win against Croatia, but it's hard to expect a favorable outcome in the table.

12 June 2008
20:45 CET

Austria	1–1	Poland
Vastić 93'		Guerreiro 30'

Ernst-Happel-Stadion
Attendance: 51,428
Referee: Howard Webb

=== Match Poland–Croatia ===
Poland–Croatia

The Poland national football team needed to win their final match against Croatia by at least two goals to advance to the next stage of the tournament. Additionally, Austria needed to defeat Germany. A poorer goal difference than Austria meant that a victory by just one goal would not have been sufficient.

The match against Croatia was held in Klagenfurt, starting at 8:45 PM like the previous games. Michał Żewłakow captained the team in the absence of Jacek Bąk. Poland attacked first, with a good chance in the 9th minute when goalkeeper Vedran Runje intercepted a cross from Wojciech Łobodziński, preventing Jacek Krzynówek from scoring. Later, Dariusz Dudka narrowly missed the goal with a header. The Croatian team also had a chance but Hrvoje Vejić's header was off target. In the 30th minute, Artur Boruc saved a one-on-one situation against Ivan Klasnić. After the break, Croatia scored – the goal came from Ivan Klasnić after a pass from Danijel Pranjić, who beat Boruc with a low, precise shot. Poland had several chances to equalize but failed to convert any. Towards the end, Tomasz Zahorski shot directly at the goalkeeper from a good position. The match ended with Croatia winning 1–0. In the other Group B match, Germany beat Austria 1–0, securing their place along with Croatia in the next stage.

The Polish team lined up in a 4–5–1 formation. The central defenders, Dariusz Dudka and Michał Żewłakow, were supported by two defensive midfielders, Mariusz Lewandowski and Rafał Murawski. The full-backs were instructed to join the attack frequently, and Marek Saganowski was supported by Roger. However, this plan did not succeed, as the opponents dominated the midfield and dictated the game's pace. At halftime, Adam Kokoszka replaced Mariusz Lewandowski, moving Dudka into midfield. Poland continued with a single striker; later, Euzebiusz Smolarek replaced Wojciech Łobodziński, and Tomasz Zahorski came on as well, moving Smolarek to the attack and Zahorski to the right wing.

Coach Leo Beenhakker commented after the match:

We tried, but it didn't work out. We are very disappointed, we had great ambitions. The qualifying matches showed that these expectations weren't too high, but we played worse during the tournament. Several key players like Euzebiusz Smolarek, Jacek Krzynówek, and Mariusz Lewandowski were out of form. Our dream was to achieve a good result at the Euros. Summing up all three matches, we weren't good enough to compete equally with Europe's best teams. I'm not afraid of being judged after the tournament. I'm not the only one in this situation. Coaches like Raymond Domenech, Roberto Donadoni, and several others are also in similar positions.

16 June 2008
20:45 CET

Poland	0–1	Croatia
		Klasnić 52'

Wörthersee Stadion
Attendance: 30,461
Referee: Kyros Vassaras

== After the championships ==
Following the group stage, coach Leo Beenhakker allowed the players to decide individually when to return home. Most of the players took this opportunity and left Bad Waltersdorf the night after the Croatia match. Some delayed their departure by a few hours, seeking convenient travel options to Poland. Others left without saying goodbye to the coaching staff.

Leo Beenhakker remained as the coach of the Poland national football team, but the Polish Football Association's Training Department required him to appoint a Polish successor and a first assistant. Rafał Ulatowski was chosen as the successor, with Andrzej Zamilski and Radosław Mroczkowski as collaborating coaches. Defender Jacek Bąk retired from the national team, having played 96 matches and scored three goals. Maciej Żurawski was not called up to the national team again after the tournament. Poland dropped from 28th to 32nd in the FIFA Men's World Ranking.

The media criticized Leo Beenhakker's personnel decisions after the UEFA European Championship, accusing him of dropping Jakub Błaszczykowski too quickly. German media reported that it was not an injury but a conflict between the Borussia Dortmund player and the coach that led to Błaszczykowski's early return home. In an interview with Polsat Sport, Błaszczykowski stated that his health condition prevented him from playing against Germany. He explained the situation to the coach, who then consulted with the rest of the staff, and the decision was made to call up Łukasz Piszczek in his place.

== See also ==
- Poland at the UEFA European Championship
