= UEFA Euro 2008 Group B =

Football tournament group stage

Group B of UEFA Euro 2008 was played from 8 to 16 June 2008. All six of the group's matches were played at venues in Austria, in Vienna and Klagenfurt. The group was made up of four central European nations; co-hosts Austria, as well as Croatia, Germany and Poland. Austria and Poland were appearing in a European Championship finals for the first time.

Croatia became the first team from the group to qualify for the quarter-finals after following up a 1–0 victory against Austria in their first match with a 2–1 win over Germany. This, in conjunction with Austria's 1–1 draw with Poland, meant that Croatia finish top of Group B. The second quarter-final berth was decided by the group's final matches, with Germany defeating Austria through a Michael Ballack free kick, making the result of the Poland vs. Croatia match irrelevant. Had Germany lost, Poland could still have qualified with a win over Croatia. However, a goal from Ivan Klasnić won the game for Croatia, making the Croatians the first team to gain maximum points in the group stage.

== Teams ==
Draw position	Team	Pot	Method of qualification	Date of qualification	Finals appearance	Last appearance	Previous best performance	UEFA Rankings		FIFA Rankings June 2008
Draw position	Team	Pot	Method of qualification	Date of qualification	Finals appearance	Last appearance	Previous best performance	November 2007 (Note: The UEFA rankings of November 2007 were used for seeding for the final draw.)	May 2008 (Note: UEFA unveiled a new ranking system in May 2008 based on results up to November 2007.)	FIFA Rankings June 2008
B1	Austria	1	Co-host	12 December 2002	1st	—	Debut	27	29	92
B2	Croatia	2	Group E winner	17 November 2007	3rd	2004	Quarter-finals (1996)	2	11	15
B3	Germany (Note: From 1972 to 1988, Germany competed as West Germany.)	3	Group D runner-up	13 October 2007	10th	2004	Winners (1972, 1980, 1996)	7	4	5
B4	Poland	4	Group A winner	17 November 2007	1st	—	Debut	12	13	28

== Standings ==
Pos	Team	Pld	W	D	L	GF	GA	GD	Pts	Qualification
1	Croatia	3	3	0	0	4	1	+3	9	Advance to knockout stage
2	Germany	3	2	0	1	4	2	+2	6	Advance to knockout stage
3	Austria (H)	3	0	1	2	1	3	−2	1 (Note: Tied on head-to-head result (Austria 1–1 Poland). Overall goal difference was used as the tiebreaker.)	
4	Poland	3	0	1	2	1	4	−3	1	

Source: UEFA
Rules for classification: Group stage tiebreakers
(H) Hosts
Notes:

In the quarter-finals,

- The winner of Group B, Croatia, advanced to play the runner-up of Group A, Turkey.
- The runner-up of Group B, Germany, advanced to play the winner of Group A, Portugal.

== Matches ==
=== Austria vs Croatia ===
8 June 2008
18:00

Austria	0–1	Croatia
	Report	Modrić 4' (pen.)

Ernst-Happel-Stadion, Vienna
Attendance: 51,428
Referee: Pieter Vink (Netherlands)

Austria	Croatia

GK	21	Jürgen Macho
CB	15	Sebastian Prödl	(yellow card) 68'
CB	3	Martin Stranzl
CB	4	Emanuel Pogatetz	(yellow card) 3'
DM	6	René Aufhauser
DM	19	Jürgen Säumel	(yellow card) 21'	(substituted off) 61'
RM	2	Joachim Standfest
LM	12	Ronald Gërçaliu		(substituted off) 69'
AM	10	Andreas Ivanschitz (c)
CF	20	Martin Harnik
CF	9	Roland Linz		(substituted off) 73'
Substitutions:
MF	7	Ivica Vastić		(substituted on) 61'
MF	11	Ümit Korkmaz		(substituted on) 69'
FW	18	Roman Kienast		(substituted on) 73'
Manager:
Josef Hickersberger

GK	1	Stipe Pletikosa
RB	5	Vedran Ćorluka
CB	4	Robert Kovač	(yellow card) 51'
CB	3	Josip Šimunić
LB	22	Danijel Pranjić
RM	11	Darijo Srna
CM	10	Niko Kovač (c)
CM	14	Luka Modrić
LM	19	Niko Kranjčar		(substituted off) 61'
CF	18	Ivica Olić		(substituted off) 83'
CF	21	Mladen Petrić		(substituted off) 72'
Substitutions:
DF	15	Dario Knežević		(substituted on) 61'
FW	20	Igor Budan		(substituted on) 72'
MF	8	Ognjen Vukojević		(substituted on) 83'
Manager:
Slaven Bilić

Man of the Match:
Stipe Pletikosa (Croatia)

Assistant referees:
Adriaan Inia (Netherlands)
Hans ten Hoove (Netherlands)
Fourth official:
Kristinn Jakobsson (Iceland)
Reserve assistant referee:
Dimitrios Bozatzidis (Greece)

=== Germany vs Poland ===
8 June 2008
20:45

Germany	2–0	Poland
Podolski 20', 72'	Report

Wörthersee Stadion, Klagenfurt
Attendance: 30,461
Referee: Tom Henning Øvrebø (Norway)

Germany	Poland

GK	1	Jens Lehmann
RB	16	Philipp Lahm
CB	21	Christoph Metzelder
CB	17	Per Mertesacker
LB	2	Marcell Jansen
RM	4	Clemens Fritz		(substituted off) 56'
CM	8	Torsten Frings
CM	13	Michael Ballack (c)
LM	20	Lukas Podolski
CF	9	Mario Gómez		(substituted off) 75'
CF	11	Miroslav Klose		(substituted off) 90+1'
Substitutions:
MF	7	Bastian Schweinsteiger	(yellow card) 64'	(substituted on) 56'
MF	15	Thomas Hitzlsperger		(substituted on) 75'
FW	22	Kevin Kurányi		(substituted on) 90+1'
Manager:
Joachim Löw

GK	1	Artur Boruc
RB	13	Marcin Wasilewski
CB	14	Michał Żewłakow
CB	6	Jacek Bąk
LB	4	Paweł Golański		(substituted off) 75'
CM	5	Dariusz Dudka
CM	18	Mariusz Lewandowski	(yellow card) 60'
RW	17	Wojciech Łobodziński		(substituted off) 65'
AM	9	Maciej Żurawski (c)		(substituted off) 46'
LW	8	Jacek Krzynówek
CF	7	Ebi Smolarek	(yellow card) 40'
Substitutions:
MF	20	Roger Guerreiro		(substituted on) 46'
MF	16	Łukasz Piszczek		(substituted on) 65'
FW	11	Marek Saganowski		(substituted on) 75'
Manager:
(Netherlands) Leo Beenhakker

Man of the Match:
Lukas Podolski (Germany)

Assistant referees:
Geir Åge Holen (Norway)
Jan Petter Randen (Norway)
Fourth official:
Craig Thomson (Scotland)
Reserve assistant referee:
Dimitrios Saraidaris (Greece)

=== Croatia vs Germany ===
12 June 2008
18:00

Croatia	2–1	Germany
Srna 24'; Olić 62'	Report	Podolski 79'

Wörthersee Stadion, Klagenfurt
Attendance: 30,461
Referee: Frank De Bleeckere (Belgium)

Croatia	Germany

GK	1	Stipe Pletikosa
RB	5	Vedran Ćorluka
CB	4	Robert Kovač
CB	3	Josip Šimunić	(yellow card) 45+1'
LB	22	Danijel Pranjić
RM	11	Darijo Srna	(yellow card) 27'	(substituted off) 80'
CM	14	Luka Modrić	(yellow card) 90+3'
CM	10	Niko Kovač (c)
LM	7	Ivan Rakitić
SS	19	Niko Kranjčar		(substituted off) 85'
CF	18	Ivica Olić		(substituted off) 72'
Substitutions:
FW	21	Mladen Petrić		(substituted on) 72'
MF	16	Jerko Leko	(yellow card) 90+2'	(substituted on) 80'
DF	15	Dario Knežević		(substituted on) 85'
Manager:
Slaven Bilić

GK	1	Jens Lehmann	(yellow card) 90+2'
RB	16	Philipp Lahm
CB	21	Christoph Metzelder
CB	17	Per Mertesacker
LB	2	Marcell Jansen		(substituted off) 46'
RM	4	Clemens Fritz		(substituted off) 82'
CM	8	Torsten Frings
CM	13	Michael Ballack (c)	(yellow card) 75'
LM	20	Lukas Podolski
CF	9	Mario Gómez		(substituted off) 66'
CF	11	Miroslav Klose
Substitutions:
MF	19	David Odonkor		(substituted on) 46'
MF	7	Bastian Schweinsteiger	(red card) 90+2'	(substituted on) 66'
FW	22	Kevin Kurányi		(substituted on) 82'
Manager:
Joachim Löw

Man of the Match:
Luka Modrić (Croatia)

Assistant referees:
Peter Hermans (Belgium)
Alex Verstraeten (Belgium)
Fourth official:
Stéphane Lannoy (France)
Reserve assistant referee:
Matthias Arnet (Switzerland)

=== Austria vs Poland ===
12 June 2008
20:45

Austria	1–1	Poland
Vastić 90+3' (pen.)	Report	Guerreiro 30'

Ernst-Happel-Stadion, Vienna
Attendance: 51,428
Referee: Howard Webb (England)

Austria	Poland

GK	21	Jürgen Macho
RB	14	György Garics
CB	15	Sebastian Prödl	(yellow card) 72'
CB	3	Martin Stranzl
LB	4	Emanuel Pogatetz
DM	6	René Aufhauser		(substituted off) 74'
RM	8	Christoph Leitgeb
CM	10	Andreas Ivanschitz (c)		(substituted off) 64'
LM	11	Ümit Korkmaz	(yellow card) 56'
CF	20	Martin Harnik
CF	9	Roland Linz		(substituted off) 64'
Substitutions:
MF	7	Ivica Vastić		(substituted on) 64'
FW	18	Roman Kienast		(substituted on) 64'
MF	19	Jürgen Säumel		(substituted on) 74'
Manager:
Josef Hickersberger

GK	1	Artur Boruc
RB	13	Marcin Wasilewski	(yellow card) 58'
CB	2	Mariusz Jop		(substituted off) 46'
CB	6	Jacek Bąk (c)	(yellow card) 90+3'
LB	14	Michał Żewłakow
RM	5	Dariusz Dudka
CM	18	Mariusz Lewandowski
LM	8	Jacek Krzynówek	(yellow card) 61'
AM	20	Roger Guerreiro		(substituted off) 85'
CF	11	Marek Saganowski		(substituted off) 83'
CF	7	Ebi Smolarek
Substitutions:
DF	4	Paweł Golański		(substituted on) 46'
MF	17	Wojciech Łobodziński		(substituted on) 83'
MF	19	Rafał Murawski		(substituted on) 85'
Manager:
(Netherlands) Leo Beenhakker

Man of the Match:
Roger Guerreiro (Poland)

Assistant referees:
Darren Cann (England)
Mike Mullarkey (England)
Fourth official:
Viktor Kassai (Hungary)
Reserve assistant referee:
Stéphane Cuhat (Switzerland)

=== Poland vs Croatia ===
16 June 2008
20:45

Poland	0–1	Croatia
	Report	Klasnić 53'

Wörthersee Stadion, Klagenfurt
Attendance: 30,461
Referee: Kyros Vassaras (Greece)

Poland	Croatia

GK	1	Artur Boruc
RB	13	Marcin Wasilewski
CB	14	Michał Żewłakow (c)
CB	5	Dariusz Dudka
LB	3	Jakub Wawrzyniak
CM	19	Rafał Murawski
CM	18	Mariusz Lewandowski	(yellow card) 38'	(substituted off) 46'
RW	17	Wojciech Łobodziński		(substituted off) 55'
AM	20	Roger Guerreiro
LW	8	Jacek Krzynówek
CF	11	Marek Saganowski		(substituted off) 69'
Substitutions:
DF	23	Adam Kokoszka		(substituted on) 46'
FW	7	Ebi Smolarek		(substituted on) 55'
FW	21	Tomasz Zahorski	(yellow card) 84'	(substituted on) 69'
Manager:
(Netherlands) Leo Beenhakker

GK	23	Vedran Runje
RB	2	Dario Šimić (c)
CB	6	Hrvoje Vejić	(yellow card) 45'
CB	15	Dario Knežević		(substituted off) 27'
LB	22	Danijel Pranjić
RM	16	Jerko Leko
CM	8	Ognjen Vukojević	(yellow card) 85'
CM	13	Nikola Pokrivač
LM	7	Ivan Rakitić
CF	17	Ivan Klasnić		(substituted off) 74'
CF	21	Mladen Petrić		(substituted off) 75'
Substitutions:
DF	5	Vedran Ćorluka		(substituted on) 27'
FW	9	Nikola Kalinić		(substituted on) 74'
MF	19	Niko Kranjčar		(substituted on) 75'
Manager:
Slaven Bilić

Man of the Match:
Ivan Klasnić (Croatia)

Assistant referees:
Dimitrios Bozatzidis (Greece)
Dimitrios Saraidaris (Greece)
Fourth official:
Olegário Benquerença (Portugal)
Reserve assistant referee:
Alessandro Griselli (Italy)

=== Austria vs Germany ===
16 June 2008
20:45

Austria	0–1	Germany
	Report	Ballack 49'

Ernst-Happel-Stadion, Vienna
Attendance: 51,428
Referee: Manuel Mejuto González (Spain)

Austria	Germany

GK	21	Jürgen Macho
RB	14	György Garics
CB	3	Martin Stranzl	(yellow card) 13'
CB	17	Martin Hiden		(substituted off) 55'
LB	4	Emanuel Pogatetz
CM	6	René Aufhauser		(substituted off) 63'
CM	5	Christian Fuchs
RW	20	Martin Harnik		(substituted off) 67'
AM	10	Andreas Ivanschitz (c)	(yellow card) 48'
LW	11	Ümit Korkmaz
CF	22	Erwin Hoffer	(yellow card) 31'
Substitutions:
MF	8	Christoph Leitgeb		(substituted on) 55'
MF	19	Jürgen Säumel		(substituted on) 63'
FW	18	Roman Kienast		(substituted on) 67'
Manager:
Josef Hickersberger (Note: Both Hickersberger and Löw were expelled by the referee in the 41st minute.)			(red card) 41'

GK	1	Jens Lehmann
RB	3	Arne Friedrich
CB	17	Per Mertesacker
CB	21	Christoph Metzelder
LB	16	Philipp Lahm
RM	4	Clemens Fritz		(substituted off) 90+3'
CM	8	Torsten Frings
CM	13	Michael Ballack (c)
LM	20	Lukas Podolski		(substituted off) 83'
CF	9	Mario Gómez		(substituted off) 60'
CF	11	Miroslav Klose
Substitutions:
MF	15	Thomas Hitzlsperger		(substituted on) 60'
FW	10	Oliver Neuville		(substituted on) 83'
MF	18	Tim Borowski		(substituted on) 90+3'
Manager:
Joachim Löw			(red card) 41'

Man of the Match:
Michael Ballack (Germany)

Assistant referees:
Juan Carlos Yuste Jiménez (Spain)
Jesús Calvo Guadamuro (Spain)
Fourth official:
Damir Skomina (Slovenia)
Reserve assistant referee:
Paolo Calcagno (Italy)

== See also ==
- Austria at the UEFA European Championship
- Croatia at the UEFA European Championship
- Germany at the UEFA European Championship
- Poland at the UEFA European Championship
