= Radosław Matusiak =

Polish footballer (born 1982)

Personal information
- Date of birth: 1 January 1982 (age 44)
- Place of birth: Łódź, Poland
- Height: 1.84 m (6 ft 0 in)
- Position: Striker

Youth career
- –1999: Widzew Łódź
- 1999: ŁKS Łódź

Senior career*
Years	Team	Apps	(Gls)
1999–2002	ŁKS Łódź	62	(6)
2002–2003	Szczakowianka Jaworzno	11	(0)
2003	ŁKS Łódź	14	(3)
2003–2004	Wisła Płock	14	(0)
2004–2007	GKS Bełchatów	78	(30)
2007	Palermo	3	(1)
2007–2008	Heerenveen	10	(1)
2008	→ Wisła Kraków (loan)	8	(1)
2009	Widzew Łódź	7	(1)
2009–2010	Cracovia	35	(8)
2011–2012	Asteras Tripoli	4	(0)
2012	Widzew Łódź	10	(1)
Total		256	(52)

International career
1999–2000	Poland U16		
2006–2008	Poland	15	(7)
Medal record
Men's football
Representing Poland
UEFA European Under-16 Championship
Runner-up	1999 Czech Republic
- * Club domestic league appearances and goals

Radosław Matusiak (Polish pronunciation: [raˈdɔswav maˈtuɕak]; born 1 January 1982) is a Polish former professional footballer who played as a striker.

== Club career ==
Matusiak's contribution at the senior national team level caught the eyes of a handful of clubs in Europe during the winter transfer window. Speculations of the Polish striker joining Italian side Palermo, third-placed team in the Serie A at the time, were finally realized on 30 January 2007, when he was announced to have signed a three-and-a-half-year contract with the Sicilian club, worth nearly €2 million. After a couple of substitute appearances, Matusiak made his debut in the starting lineup on 13 May 2007 in a league match against Ascoli, promptly scoring his first goal for the club.

On 24 August 2007, Matusiak signed a three-year contract with an option for a fourth with Dutch side SC Heerenveen. In January 2008, however, he returned to Poland, being loaned for the duration of the season to Wisła Kraków. In the summer of 2008, his contract with Heerenveen was canceled by mutual agreement. He spent the first half of the 2008–09 season pursuing interests outside of football, but rejected media reports that he had retired from the sport. On 23 December 2008, he signed with Widzew Łódź. On 21 August 2009, he joimed Cracovia on a two-year contract. On 18 January 2011, he signed a contract with Asteras Tripoli. After an unlucky period in Greece, in February 2012 he returned to his old club – Widzew Łódź. He became a free agent at the end of the 2011–12 season.

== International career ==
Matusiak was part of the Poland U16 team which placed second at 1999 UEFA European Under-16 Championship. In 2006, he earned his first senior international cap. In his first appearance, he scored his debut goal for Poland in a UEFA Euro 2008 qualifying match against Serbia on 6 September 2006. On 15 November, he scored the only goal in a qualifier against Belgium in Brussels, keeping his country's hopes of qualifying alive.

== Career statistics ==
Appearances and goals by national team and year
National team	Year	Apps	Goals
Poland
Poland	2006	5	3
Poland	2007	7	2
Poland	2008	3	2
Total		15	7

Scores and results list Poland's goal tally first, score column indicates score after each Matusiak goal.

List of international goals scored by Radosław Matusiak
No.	Date	Venue	Opponent	Score	Result	Competition
1	6 September 2006	Polish Army Stadium, Warsaw, Poland	Serbia	1–0	1–1	UEFA Euro 2008 qualifying
2	15 November 2006	King Baudouin Stadium, Brussels, Belgium	Belgium	1–0	1–0	UEFA Euro 2008 qualifying
3	6 December 2006	Al Nahyan Stadium, Abu Dhabi, UAE	United Arab Emirates	5–2	5–2	Friendly
4	7 February 2007	Estadio Municipal de Chapín, Jerez de la Frontera, Spain	Slovakia	2–2	2–2	Friendly
5	21 November 2007	Red Star Stadium, Belgrad, Serbia	Serbia	2–0	2–2	UEFA Euro 2008 qualifying
6	27 February 2008	Amica Stadium, Wronki, Poland	Estonia	1–0	2–0	Friendly
7	26 May 2008	Stadion an der Kreuzeiche, Reutlingen, Germany	Macedonia	1–1	1–1	Friendly

== Honours ==
Wisła Kraków

- Ekstraklasa: 2007–08

Widzew Łódź

- I liga: 2008–09

Poland U16

- UEFA European Under-16 Championship runner-up: 1999

Individual

- Polish Newcomer of the Year: 2006
