= Roger Guerreiro =

Brazilian-born footballer

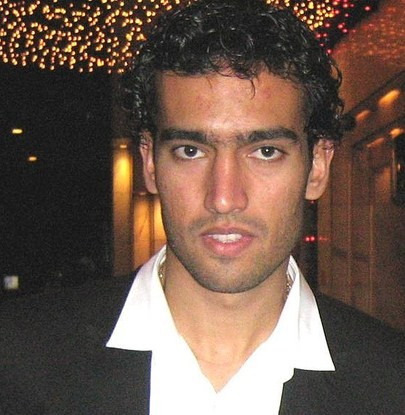

Personal information
- Full name: Roger Guerreiro
- Date of birth: 25 May 1982 (age 44)
- Place of birth: São Paulo, Brazil
- Height: 1.86 m (6 ft 1 in)
- Position: Attacking midfielder

Youth career
- 1997–2002: São Caetano

Senior career*
Years	Team	Apps	(Gls)
2002–2005	Corinthians	5	(0)
2004	→ Flamengo (loan)	36	(3)
2005	→ Celta de Vigo (loan)	13	(0)
2005–2006	Juventude	21	(1)
2006	→ Legia Warsaw (loan)	13	(3)
2007–2009	Legia Warsaw	88	(16)
2009–2013	AEK Athens	84	(4)
2013	Guaratinguetá	0	(0)
2014	Comercial	2	(0)
2015	Rio Branco-PR	16	(2)
2015	Aris Limassol	5	(0)
2016	Villa Nova-MG	9	(1)
2016	Hercílio Luz-SC	10	(2)
2017	Rio Verde	8	(1)
Total		310	(33)

International career
2008–2011	Poland	25	(4)
- * Club domestic league appearances and goals

Roger Guerreiro (Brazilian Portuguese: [ˈʁoʒeʁ ɡeˈʁejɾu], Polish pronunciation: [ˈrɔʐɛr ɡɛˈrɛjrɔ]; born on 25 May 1982), commonly known as Roger, is a former professional footballer who played as an attacking midfielder. Born in Brazil, he was granted Polish citizenship and represented Poland at the international level.

== Club career ==
=== AEK Athens ===
On 27 August 2009, Guerreiro signed a four-year contract with AEK Athens. He made his debut for AEK against Iraklis on 13 September 2009.

Guerreiro was a regular for AEK until he fell out of favor with coach Dušan Bajević. In the transfer period, Guerreiro was offered to many European clubs. After the transfer period ended, Guerreiro apologized to Bajević and was given another chance. Guerreiro's first match of the 2010–11 season was an away game against Aris, the match ended in a 4–0 win for AEK Athens.

Guerreiro scored his first goal for AEK against Atromitos scoring the only goal of the match giving AEK the 1–0 win. His contract ended in 2013 and was not renewed.

== International career ==
He was granted Polish citizenship on 17 April 2008. Roger received the citizenship in a speedy procedure, and was called-up by the Poland national team, coached by Leo Beenhakker, for the UEFA Euro 2008. He made his debut for Poland in against Albania on 27 May 2008.

=== UEFA Euro 2008 ===
On 12 June, he scored his first goal for the Poland national team with a 30th-minute shot against Austria in the second Group B match of the UEFA Euro 2008. For this game, UEFA named him the man of the match. It was Poland's first-ever goal in the European Championship.

== Career statistics ==
=== International ===
Appearances and goals by national team and year
National team	Year	Apps	Goals
Poland
Poland	2008	11	2
Poland	2009	11	2
Poland	2011	3	0
Total		25	4

Scores and results list Poland's goal tally first, score column indicates score after each Guerreiro goal.

List of international goals scored by Roger Guerreiro
No.	Date	Venue	Opponent	Score	Result	Competition
1	12 June 2008	Ernst-Happel-Stadion, Vienna, Austria	Austria	1–0	1–1	UEFA Euro 2008
2	19 November 2008	Croke Park, Dublin, Republic of Ireland	Republic of Ireland	2–0	3–2	Friendly
3	11 February 2009	Vila Real de Santo António, Portugal	Wales	1–0	1–0	Friendly
4	9 June 2009	Cape Town, South Africa	Iraq	1–1	1–1	Friendly

== Honours ==
Legia Warsaw

- Ekstraklasa: 2005–06
- Polish Cup: 2007–08
- Polish Super Cup: 2008

AEK Athens

- Greek Cup: 2010–11

Individual

- Piłka Nożna Foreigner of the Year: 2007
