= Jacek Bąk =

Polish footballer (born 1973)

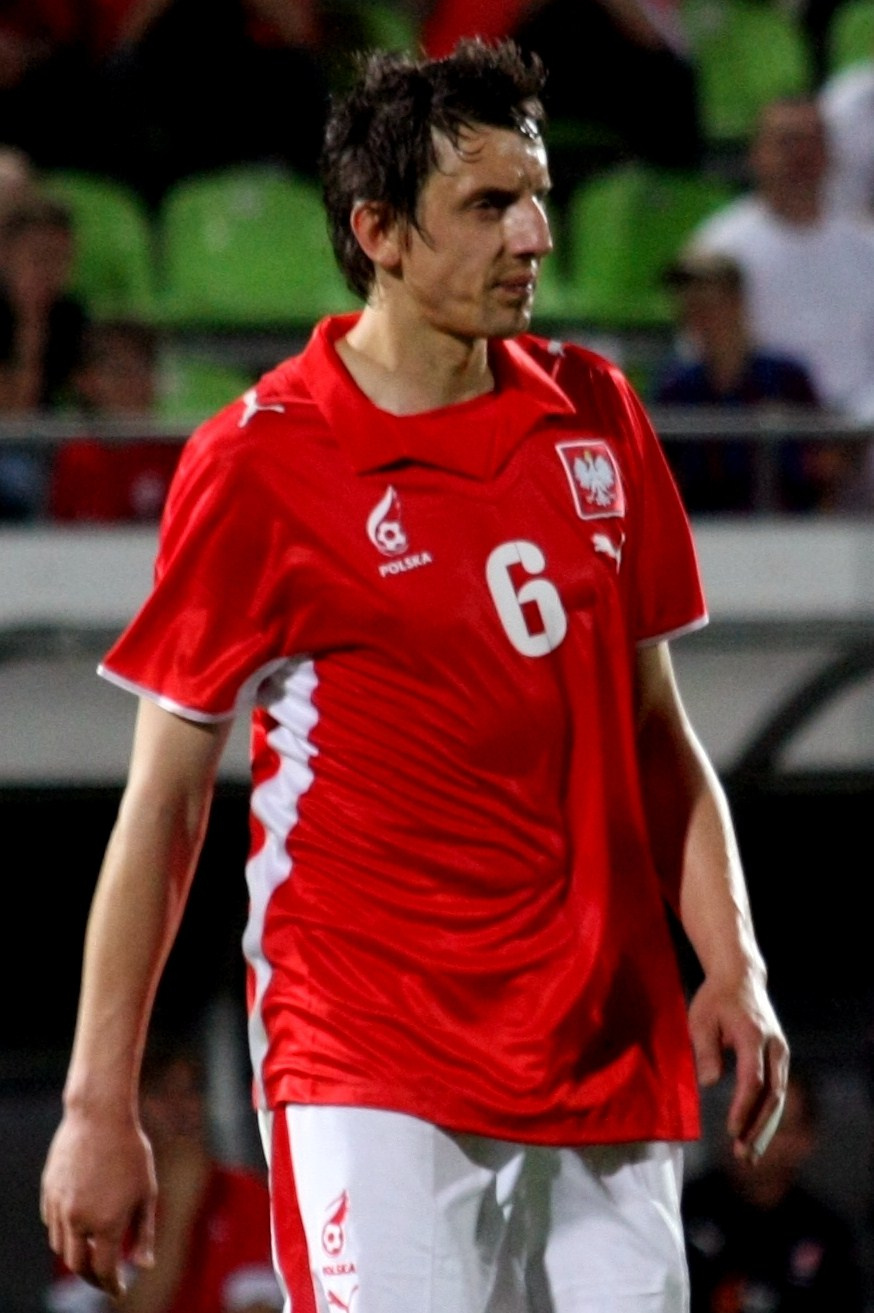
- Bąk playing for Poland in 2008

Personal information
- Full name: Jacek Waldemar Bąk
- Date of birth: 24 March 1973 (age 53)
- Place of birth: Lublin, Poland
- Height: 1.87 m (6 ft 2 in)
- Position: Centre-back

Youth career
- Motor Lublin

Senior career*
Years	Team	Apps	(Gls)
1989–1992	Motor Lublin	46	(2)
1992–1995	Lech Poznań	84	(2)
1995–2001	Lyon	114	(4)
2002–2005	Lens	85	(2)
2005–2007	Al Rayyan	26	(0)
2007–2010	Austria Wien	80	(7)
Total		435	(17)

International career
1993–2008	Poland	96	(3)
- * Club domestic league appearances and goals

Jacek Waldemar Bąk (Polish pronunciation: [ˈjatsɛɡ ˈbɔŋk]; born 24 March 1973) is a Polish former professional footballer who played as a central defender.

Other than his country, he competed in France, Qatar and Austria, notably appearing in more than 150 competitive games for Lyon and contributing to win the 2002 national championship.

Bąk represented Poland for 15 years, appearing for the nation in two World Cups and Euro 2008.

Since 2004 he is a French citizen.

== Club career ==
Born in Lublin, Bąk made his senior debuts with local Motor Lublin aged just 16, moving to Lech Poznań two years later. In the 1992–93 season, he contributed with 28 games to help the latter club win its third national championship in four years.

Bąk signed for Lyon in the 1995 summer, going on to spend one full decade in the French Ligue 1 with that team and Lens, joining the latter in January 2002. The sides he played for during that campaign finished in first and second position.

Bąk retired in June 2010 at the age of 37, after two years in the Qatar Stars League with Al-Rayyan SC and three with Austrian Bundesliga's Austria Wien.

== International career ==
Bąk gained his first cap for the Poland national team on 1 February 1993, in a 0–0 away friendly draw with Cyprus. He was picked for the squads that competed in the 2002 (one appearance, a 2–0 group stage loss to co-hosts South Korea) and the 2006 FIFA World Cups, with both tournaments ending in elimination after three matches.

In November 2006, Bąk claimed he was offered €10,000 to concede a penalty in a UEFA Euro 2008 qualifier between Belgium and Poland in the former's favour, and UEFA opened an investigation. Selected for the finals by manager Leo Beenhakker, he was left out of the final group phase clash against Croatia, and retired with 96 appearances, fourth-most at the time.

== Career statistics ==
=== International ===
Appearances and goals by national team and year
National team	Year	Apps	Goals
Poland	1993	6	0
Poland	1994	6	1
Poland	1995	0	0
Poland	1996	0	0
Poland	1997	2	0
Poland	1998	4	0
Poland	1999	6	0
Poland	2000	4	0
Poland	2001	5	0
Poland	2002	7	0
Poland	2003	10	1
Poland	2004	8	0
Poland	2005	10	0
Poland	2006	13	0
Poland	2007	9	1
Poland	2008	6	0
Total		96	3

Scores and results list Poland's goal tally first, score column indicates score after each Bąk goal.

List of international goals scored by Jacek Bąk
No.	Date	Venue	Opponent	Score	Result	Competition
1	17 August 1994	Stadion Miejski, Radom, Poland	Belarus	1–0	1–1	Friendly
2	12 November 2003	Stadion Wojska Polskiego, Warsaw, Poland	Italy	1–0	3–1	Friendly
3	24 March 2007	Stadion Wojska Polskiego, Warsaw, Poland	Azerbaijan	1–0	5–0	UEFA Euro 2008 qualifying

== Honours ==
Lech Poznań

- Ekstraklasa: 1992–93

Lyon

- UEFA Intertoto Cup: 1997

Al Rayyan

- Emir of Qatar Cup: 2005–06

Austria Wien

- Austrian Cup: 2008–09
