= Jacek Krzynówek =

Polish footballer

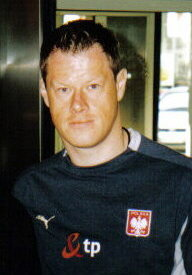
- Krzynówek with Poland in 2007

Personal information
- Full name: Jacek Krzynówek
- Date of birth: 15 May 1976 (age 50)
- Place of birth: Kamieńsk, Poland
- Height: 1.79 m (5 ft 10 in)
- Positions: Left midfielder; left winger; second striker

Senior career*
Years	Team	Apps	(Gls)
1994–1996	RKS Radomsko	9	(1)
1996–1997	Raków Częstochowa	17	(0)
1997–1999	GKS Bełchatów	61	(11)
1999–2004	1. FC Nürnberg	142	(28)
2004–2006	Bayer Leverkusen	52	(9)
2006–2009	VfL Wolfsburg	55	(7)
2009–2010	Hannover 96	25	(2)
Total		361	(58)

International career
1998–2009	Poland	96	(15)
- * Club domestic league appearances and goals

Jacek Kamil Krzynówek (Polish pronunciation: [ˈjatsɛk kʂɨˈnuvɛk]; born 15 May 1976) is a Polish former professional footballer who played as a midfielder or striker.

He is regarded as one of the best Polish footballers. He was named the Polish Footballer of the Year twice by the Piłka Nożna magazine in 2003 and 2004. He has appeared in 96 international matches for Poland, scoring 15 goals. He is also a member of PZPN's Outstanding Representatives Club (Klub Wybitnych Reprezentantów).

== Club career ==
Krzynówek's football career started with LZS Chrzanowice. In 1994, he joined RKS Radomsko where he played two seasons and then moved to another Polish club, Raków Częstochowa, in which he made his debut on 28 July 1996 in the Polish Ekstraklasa.

After a season with Raków, he moved to second division club, GKS Bełchatów. In the 1997–98 season, he with his team advanced to the Ekstraklasa. His club was unable to keep itself in the top division, and was relegated to the second division. Despite this, his skills and play impressed scouts from other clubs, including 1. FC Nürnberg, as well as the coach of the Poland national team, Janusz Wójcik.

In 1999, he moved to 1. FC Nürnberg in the 2. Bundesliga. In 2002, he contributed to the promotion of 1. FC Nürnberg to the Bundesliga, and was named the best left midfielder in the 2. Bundesliga. He missed most of the 2002–03 season due to injury.

As a result of his performances in 2004, he was transferred to Bundesliga club Bayer Leverkusen. In the 2004–05 season, he was one of Bayer's best players, and the trio of Krzynówek, Andriy Voronin and Dimitar Berbatov drew the attention of many top European sides. Bayer Leverkusen also performed well in the Champions League, defeating both Real Madrid and Roma in the group stage, but were eliminated by eventual champions Liverpool in the round of 16. Krzynówek scored three goals, one of which was a long shot versus Real Madrid.

As a result of another injury during the spring of 2006, he was unable to play regularly at Bayer. After a disappointing 2005–06 season, he moved to VfL Wolfsburg.

On 17 November 2007, Wisła Kraków announced that they were interested in purchasing Krzynówek during the Ekstraklasa transfer window, but the Polish club could not agree terms with VfL Wolfsburg.

On 2 February 2009, Krzynówek moved to Hannover 96 where he stayed until the summer of 2010.

On 15 August 2011, Krzynówek officially announced his retirement after 178 matches in the German top-flight.

== International career ==
Whilst still a player for GKS Bełchatów, Krzynówek made his debut for the Poland national team on 10 November 1998 in a 3–1 win over Slovakia. He made his return to the national team in the beginning of 2000, after Jerzy Engel became coach. Soon after, he became one of the most important players in the team that qualified for the 2002 FIFA World Cup. He was later included in Poland's squad for the tournament. Despite a poor performance by Poland, he was praised for his play, and appeared in all three matches.

In August 2005, he was part of the national team's triumphant performance at the Valeri Lobanovsky Memorial Tournament 2005. During 2006 FIFA World Cup qualification, he played in the most important games for Poland and contributed to their qualification for the 2006 FIFA World Cup in Germany. Poland exited the tournament in the group stage, having lost 2–0 to Ecuador in the opening game, 1–0 to hosts Germany, and won their last match against Costa Rica 2–1.

Krzynówek was a key player in the UEFA Euro 2008 qualifying campaign for Poland where he scored four goals; three against Azerbaijan and an equaliser goal in the 87th minute against Portugal. He struck with his left foot from 40 yards hit the post and the back of Portuguese keeper Ricardo before entering the back of the net. Thanks to his successful performance in this game, he was then picked into Eurosport's dream team as the left midfielder. He was selected to Poland's squad for UEFA Euro 2008, Poland's first-ever participation in the UEFA European Championship.

== Retirement and post-retirement ==
Between 1 July 2015 and 31 May 2016, Krzynówek was the sporting director at GKS Bełchatów.

== Career statistics ==
=== International ===
Appearances and goals by national team and year
National team	Year	Apps	Goals
Poland	1998	1	0
Poland	2000	8	0
Poland	2001	10	1
Poland	2002	7	0
Poland	2003	10	3
Poland	2004	10	3
Poland	2005	8	2
Poland	2006	11	0
Poland	2007	10	5
Poland	2008	13	1
Poland	2009	8	0
Total		96	15

Scores and results list Poland's goal tally first, score column indicates score after each Krzynówek goal.

List of international goals scored by Jacek Krzynówek
No.	Date	Venue	Opponent	Score	Result	Competition
1	28 February 2001	Larnaca, Cyprus	Switzerland	4–0	4–0	Friendly
2	30 April 2003	Brussels, Belgium	Belgium	1–2	1–3	Friendly
3	6 June 2003	Poznań, Poland	Kazakhstan	3–0	3–0	Friendly
4	12 November 2003	Warsaw, Poland	Italy	3–1	3–1	Friendly
5	4 September 2004	Belfast, Northern Ireland	Northern Ireland	3–0	3–0	2006 FIFA World Cup qualification
6	9 October 2004	Vienna, Austria	Austria	2–1	3–1	2006 FIFA World Cup qualification
7	13 October 2004	Cardiff, Wales	Wales	3–1	3–2	2006 FIFA World Cup qualification
8	26 March 2005	Warsaw, Poland	Azerbaijan	6–0	8–0	2006 FIFA World Cup qualification
9	7 October 2005	Warsaw, Poland	Iceland	1–1	3–2	Friendly
10	24 March 2007	Warsaw, Poland	Azerbaijan	4–0	5–0	UEFA Euro 2008 qualifying
11	2 June 2007	Baku, Azerbaijan	Azerbaijan	2–1	3–1	UEFA Euro 2008 qualifying
12	2 June 2007	Baku, Azerbaijan	Azerbaijan	3–1	3–1	UEFA Euro 2008 qualifying
13	22 August 2007	Moscow, Russia	Russia	1–2	2–2	Friendly
14	8 September 2007	Lisbon, Portugal	Portugal	2–2	2–2	UEFA Euro 2008 qualifying
15	1 June 2008	Chorzów, Poland	Denmark	1–1	1–1	Friendly

== Honours ==
Individual

- Polish Footballer of the Year: 2003, 2004
