= Wojciech Łobodziński =

Polish footballer (born 1982)

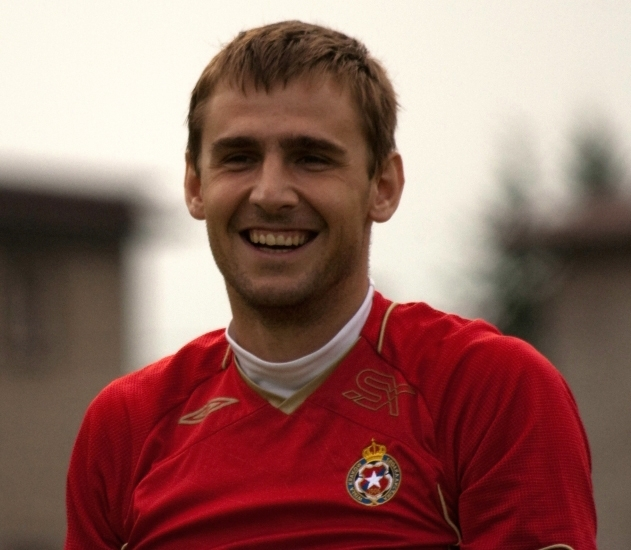

Personal information
- Date of birth: 20 October 1982 (age 44)
- Place of birth: Bydgoszcz, Poland
- Height: 1.88 m (6 ft 2 in)
- Position: Midfielder

Youth career
- 1992–1999: Zawisza Bydgoszcz

Senior career*
Years	Team	Apps	(Gls)
1999	Zawisza Bydgoszcz	4	(4)
1999	Stomil Olsztyn	1	(0)
2000–2003	Wisła Płock	39	(3)
2003–2007	Zagłębie Lubin	121	(18)
2008–2011	Wisła Kraków	70	(4)
2012	ŁKS Łódź	11	(1)
2012–2020	Miedź Legnica	171	(31)
2019–2020	Miedź Legnica II	23	(5)
Total		441	(66)

International career
1996–1997	Poland U14	7	(1)
1997–1998	Poland U15	11	(4)
1998–1999	Poland U16	23	(4)
1999–2000	Poland U17	10	(0)
2000–2001	Poland U18	11	(4)
2002	Poland U21	2	(0)
2005	Poland B	1	(0)
2006–2009	Poland	23	(2)

Managerial career
- 2021: Miedź Legnica II
- 2021–2022: Miedź Legnica
- 2023: Wieczysta Kraków
- 2023–2024: Arka Gdynia
- 2025: Miedź Legnica
- 2025–2026: Zagłębie Sosnowiec
Medal record
Men's football
Representing Poland
UEFA European Under-18 Championship
Winner	2001 Finland
UEFA European Under-16 Championship
Runner-up	1999 Czech Republic
- * Club domestic league appearances and goals

Wojciech Łobodziński (Polish pronunciation: [ˈvɔjt͡ɕɛx wɔbɔˈd͡ʑij̃skʲi]; born 20 October 1982) is a Polish professional football manager and former player who played as a midfielder. He was most recently in charge of II liga club Zagłębie Sosnowiec.

== Club career ==
Łobodziński started playing football with Zawisza Bydgoszcz. In 1999, he joined Stomil Olsztyn where he made a debut in the Ekstraklasa. Subsequently, Łobodziński moved to Wisła Płock where he played until 2003. Then he played for Zagłębie Lubin and helped the team win Ekstraklasa championship in 2006–07 season. In 2008 Łobodziński moved to Wisła Kraków where he played until 2011, winning the Ekstraklasa title three times. In 2012, he joined another Ekstraklasa outfit, ŁKS Łódź.

== International career ==
He was part of the Poland U16 team that placed second at the 1999 UEFA Euro Under-16, as well as the under-18s that won the 2001 UEFA European Under-18 Championship in Finland.

On 6 December 2006, he made his debut for the senior side in a 5–2 victory over United Arab Emirates in a friendly match. Łobodziński was selected for the Euro 2008, appearing in all three group stage matches in an eventual group stage exit.

== Managerial career ==
On 11 January 2019, half-a-year after playing a major role in Miedź's first-ever promotion to Ekstraklasa, Łobodziński left the first team to continue the twilight of his playing career with Miedź Legnica II, where he would also serve as an assistant coach.

=== Miedź Legnica ===
After retiring in 2020, Łobodziński joined Miedź's first-team staff as an assistant. He took on his first managerial role on 6 April 2021, taking charge of Miedź's reserve side and leading the team to eight wins in 14 III liga matches, before being appointed manager of Miedź's senior squad on 16 June.

With Łobodziński leading the team, they enjoyed a successful campaign, earning promotion back to top-tier and finishing the season 15 points ahead of second-placed Widzew Łódź. Miedź's return to Ekstraklasa saw them struggling in the opening rounds, earning just five points in eleven matches, which resulted in Łobodziński's sacking on 11 October 2022.

=== Wieczysta Kraków ===
On 21 March 2023, he was appointed head coach of III liga club Wieczysta Kraków, signing a deal until the end of the season. After finishing their group in third and failing to move up to II liga, Łobodziński's contract was not extended.

=== Arka Gdynia ===
Two days after his exit from Wieczysta was confirmed, Łobodziński was announced as the new manager of second-tier side Arka Gdynia on 16 June 2024. He signed a one-year contract, which would be extended automatically in case of Arka's promotion to Ekstraklasa. After a slow start to the 2023–24 campaign, the Pomeranian outfit improved across the season, trading the top spot in the table with local rivals Lechia Gdańsk throughout most of it. On 10 April 2024, Łobodziński penned a new deal, tying him with the club until the end of June 2026. Ultimately, Arka failed to earn promotion to the Ekstraklasa, dropping out of the automatic promotion positions following defeats in the last two rounds of the regular season before losing the play-off final against Motor Lublin 1–2, despite leading until the 87th minute.

Following a poor start to the following campaign, Arka and Łobodziński agreed to part ways on 26 August 2024.

=== Return to Miedź ===
On 10 March 2025, Łobodziński returned as head coach of I liga club Miedź Legnica, replacing Ireneusz Mamrot. After leading Miedź to a promotion play-off final, his contract was extended for another season in June 2025. On 4 August 2025, after losing the first three games of the 2025–26 season, Łobodziński left the club.

=== Zagłębie Sosnowiec ===
On 8 September 2025, Łobodziński was appointed manager of II liga club Zagłębie Sosnowiec, signing a one-year contract with an option for another year. Following a 7–1 loss to Olimpia Grudziądz, he was dismissed by Zagłębie's board on 16 March 2026. He left Zagłębie after 15 games in charge, with a record of six wins, two draws and seven losses.

== Career statistics ==
=== Club ===
Appearances and goals by club, season and competition
Club	Season	League			Polish Cup		Europe		Other		Total	
Club	Season	Division	Apps	Goals	Apps	Goals	Apps	Goals	Apps	Goals	Apps	Goals
Zawisza Bydgoszcz	1998–99	III liga	4	4	—		—		—		4	4
Stomil Olsztyn	1999–2000	Ekstraklasa	1	0	1	0	—		2 (Note: Appearance(s) in Polish League Cup)	0	4	0
Wisła Płock	1999–2000	Ekstraklasa	3	0	1	0	—		—		4	0
Wisła Płock	2000–01	Ekstraklasa	3	1	0	0	—		1	0	4	1
Wisła Płock	2001–02	II liga	17	1	4	0	—		3	0	24	1
Wisła Płock	2002–03	Ekstraklasa	16	1	5	0	—		—		21	1
Wisła Płock	Total		39	3	10	0	—		4	0	53	3
Zagłębie Lubin	2003–04	II liga	24	5	1	0	—		—		25	5
Zagłębie Lubin	2004–05	Ekstraklasa	23	7	14	6	—		—		37	13
Zagłębie Lubin	2005–06	Ekstraklasa	29	3	9	1	—		—		38	4
Zagłębie Lubin	2006–07	Ekstraklasa	30	3	2	0	2 (Note: Appearance(s) in UEFA Cup/UEFA Europa League)	1	4 (Note: Appearance(s) in Ekstraklasa Cup)	0	38	4
Zagłębie Lubin	2007–08	Ekstraklasa	15	0	2	1	2 (Note: Appearance(s) in UEFA Champions League)	0	3 (Note: Two appearances and one goal in Ekstraklasa Cup, one appearance in Polish Super Cup)	1	22	2
Zagłębie Lubin	Total		121	18	28	8	4	1	7	1	160	28
Wisła Kraków	2007–08	Ekstraklasa	11	1	4	0	—		1	0	16	1
Wisła Kraków	2008–09	Ekstraklasa	26	2	4	0	6 (Note: Four appearances in UEFA Champions League, two appearances in UEFA Cup)	0	2	0	38	2
Wisła Kraków	2009–10	Ekstraklasa	27	1	4	1	2	0	1 (Note: Appearance in Polish Super Cup)	0	34	2
Wisła Kraków	2010–11	Ekstraklasa	6	0	2	0	2	0	—		10	0
Wisła Kraków	Total		70	4	14	1	10	0	4	0	98	5
ŁKS Łódź	2011–12	Ekstraklasa	11	1	—		—		—		11	1
Miedź Legnica	2012–13	I liga	14	7	0	0	—		—		14	7
Miedź Legnica	2013–14	I liga	28	4	4	0	—		—		32	4
Miedź Legnica	2014–15	I liga	31	8	1	0	—		—		32	8
Miedź Legnica	2015–16	I liga	32	3	2	1	—		—		34	4
Miedź Legnica	2016–17	I liga	22	3	0	0	—		—		22	3
Miedź Legnica	2017–18	I liga	28	6	2	1	—		—		30	7
Miedź Legnica	2018–19	Ekstraklasa	16	0	2	1	—		—		18	1
Miedź Legnica	2019–20	I liga	1	0	1	0	—		—		2	0
Miedź Legnica	Total		172	31	12	3	—		—		184	34
Miedź Legnica II	2018–19	III liga, gr. III	7	0	—		—		—		7	0
Miedź Legnica II	2019–20	III liga, gr. III	16	5	—		—		—		16	5
Miedź Legnica II	Total		23	5	—		—		—		23	5
Career total			441	66	67	12	14	1	15	1	537	80

=== International ===
Appearances and goals by national team and year
National team	Year	Apps	Goals
Poland	2006	1	0
Poland	2007	10	1
Poland	2008	8	1
Poland	2009	4	0
Total		23	2

Scores and results list Poland's goal tally first, score column indicates score after each Łobodziński goal.

List of international goals scored by Wojciech Łobodziński
No.	Date	Venue	Opponent	Score	Result	Competition
1	24 March 2007	Polish Army Stadium, Warsaw, Poland	Azerbaijan	3–0	5–0	UEFA Euro 2008 qualifying
2	6 February 2008	GSZ Stadium, Larnaca, Cyprus	Czech Republic	1–0	2–0	Friendly

== Managerial statistics ==
As of match played 15 March 2026

Managerial record by team and tenure
Team	From	To	Record							
Team	From	To	G	W	D	L	GF	GA	GD	Win %
Miedź Legnica II	6 April 2021	19 June 2021	13	7	2	4	21	20	+1	53.85
Miedź Legnica	19 June 2021	11 October 2022	48	25	11	12	73	46	+27	52.08
Wieczysta Kraków	21 March 2023	16 June 2023	14	8	3	3	33	14	+19	57.14
Arka Gdynia	16 June 2023	26 August 2024	46	23	11	12	72	48	+24	50.00
Miedź Legnica	10 March 2025	4 August 2025	16	5	2	9	17	31	−14	31.25
Zagłębie Sosnowiec	8 September 2025	16 March 2026	15	6	2	7	17	25	−8	40.00
Total			152	74	31	47	233	184	+49	48.68

== Honours ==
=== Player ===
Zagłębie Lubin

- Ekstraklasa: 2006–07
- Polish Super Cup: 2007

Wisła Kraków

- Ekstraklasa: 2007–08, 2008–09, 2010–11

Miedź Legnica

- I liga: 2017–18

Poland U16

- UEFA European Under-16 Championship runner-up: 1999

Poland U18

- UEFA European Under-18 Championship: 2001

=== Manager ===
Miedź Legnica

- I liga: 2021–22

Individual

- I liga Coach of the Month: October 2023, November 2023
