= UEFA Euro 2008 qualifying Group A =

Football tournament

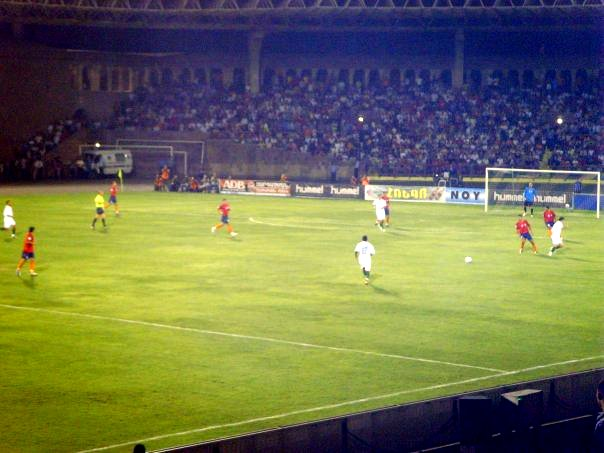
Armenia vs Portugal in Yerevan

Qualifying Group A for the 2008 UEFA European Football Championship took place between 16 August 2006 and 24 November 2007 and consisted of Portugal, Poland, Serbia, Belgium, Finland, Armenia, Azerbaijan and Kazakhstan.

Originally, Serbia and Montenegro had been drawn to compete in the group. However, following the 2006 Montenegrin independence referendum, the country was broken up and Serbia would take their place.

Not all of the matches were completed after UEFA were forced to cancel the two meetings between Armenia and Azerbaijan due to political and security concerns.

Poland qualified for UEFA Euro 2008 after defeating Belgium 2–0 in their penultimate match. They were then joined by Portugal in qualifying for the tournament after a goalless draw with Finland in their final match was enough to secure the runner-up place.

== Background ==
Serbia and Montenegro was dissolved following the successful 2006 Montenegrin independence referendum. As a result, Serbia had not played any competitive matches before.

Previously, Portugal had qualified for the UEFA European Championships on four occasions and finished runners-up as hosts in 2004. Belgium had also qualified four times previously but neither Poland, Finland, Armenia, Azerbaijan nor Kazakhstan had reached the finals.

== Format ==
The group was contested as a double round robin in which each team would play every other team twice – once at home and once away. The group winner and runner-up would qualify for UEFA Euro 2008.

== Summary ==
The group began on 16 August 2006 when Belgium and Kazakhstan played out a goalless draw. The following month, Serbia defeated Azerbaijan 1–0. The match was played behind closed doors as a result of a sanction carried over from Serbia and Montenegro's last match of the 2006 FIFA World Cup qualification. Finland defeated 10-man Poland 3–1. Belgium then defeated Armenia 1–0 while the other teams all drew.

In October 2006, Armenia and Finland drew goalless while Poland, Serbia and Portugal recorded wins against Kazakhstan, Belgium and Azerbaijan. Finland, Serbia, Poland and Belgium then recorded wins against Kazakhstan, Armenia, Portugal and Azerbaijan respectively. The following month, Finland, Poland and Portugal recorded wins against Armenia, Belgium and Kazakhstan respectively. The results left Finland top of the standings with 11 points, ahead of Poland and Serbia on 10 points and Portugal and Belgium on seven points.

In March 2007, Kazakhstan, Poland and Portugal recorded wins against Serbia, Azerbaijan and Belgium respectively. Azerbaijan and Poland then recorded 1–0 wins against Finland and Armenia respectively before Serbia and Portugal drew 1–1. In June, Armenia, Poland, Serbia and Portugal defeated Kazakhstan, Azerbaijan, Finland and Belgium respectively. Kazakhstan then drew with Azerbaijan before Armenia and Finland recorded wins against Poland and Belgium respectively. That left Poland top of the standings with 19 points ahead of Portugal, Serbia and Finland all on 14 points.

As a result of political and security disagreements stemming from the Nagorno-Karabakh conflict, Armenia and Azerbaijan were unable to find a compromise to allow the two matches between the teams – scheduled for September 2007 – to go ahead. Armenia insisted the matches be played in the usual home and away manner but Azerbaijan refused to host Armenia and proposed that the matches be played on neutral territory. On 23 June 2007, UEFA cancelled the matches and stated no points would be awarded for them. The matches would ultimately not have an impact on which teams qualified.

In August, Finland and Belgium recorded wins against Kazakhstan and Serbia respectively and Armenia held Portugal to a 1–1 draw. The following month, Serbia and Finland drew goalless and Portugal drew 2–2 with Poland. Kazakhstan then drew 2–2 with Belgium, Finland and Poland drew goalless and Serbia held Portugal to a 1–1 draw. That left Poland top of the standings with 21 points, ahead of Finland on 19 points, Portugal on 17 points and Serbia on 16 points.

In October, Armenia and Serbia and Belgium and Finland played out goalless draws while Portugal and Poland recorded wins against Azerbaijan and Kazakhstan respectively. Portugal, Serbia and Belgium then recorded victories against Kazakhstan, Azerbaijan and Armenia respectively. With two rounds of matches left to play, any two of Poland, Portugal, Finland and Serbia could qualify.

Serbia's match against Kazakhstan was originally scheduled for 17 November but was postponed due to heavy snowfall in Belgrade. It was first rescheduled for the following day but was again postponed for the same reason until 24 November. In the meantime, Finland defeated Azerbaijan 2–1 and Portugal defeated Armenia 1–0. Poland qualified for UEFA Euro 2008 after a 2–0 win against Belgium in their penultimate match. They were joined by Portugal who qualified as group runners-up after a goalless draw with Finland. In the remaining matches, Kazakhstan and Belgium recorded 1–0 wins against and Armenia and Azerbaijan respectively while Serbia drew 2–2 with Poland. Serbia then defeated Kazakhstan 1–0 in the final match.

== Standings ==
Pos	Team	Pld	W	D	L	GF	GA	GD	Pts	Qualification	(Poland)	(Portugal)	(Serbia)	(Finland)	(Belgium)	(Kazakhstan)	(Armenia)	(Azerbaijan)
1	Poland	14	8	4	2	24	12	+12	28	Qualify for final tournament	—	2–1	1–1	1–3	2–0	3–1	1–0	5–0
2	Portugal	14	7	6	1	24	10	+14	27	Qualify for final tournament	2–2	—	1–1	0–0	4–0	3–0	1–0	3–0
3	Serbia	14	6	6	2	22	11	+11	24 (Note: Head-to-head points: Serbia 4, Finland 1.)		2–2	1–1	—	0–0	1–0	1–0	3–0	1–0
4	Finland	14	6	6	2	13	7	+6	24		0–0	1–1	0–2	—	2–0	2–1	1–0	2–1
5	Belgium	14	5	3	6	14	16	−2	18		0–1	1–2	3–2	0–0	—	0–0	3–0	3–0
6	Kazakhstan	14	2	4	8	11	21	−10	10		0–1	1–2	2–1	0–2	2–2	—	1–2	1–1
7	Armenia	12	2	3	7	4	13	−9	9		1–0	1–1	0–0	0–0	0–1	0–1	—	Canc. (Note: The matches between Azerbaijan and Armenia were cancelled by UEFA with both associations receiving no points, as the two national associations failed to resolve political and security disagreements.)
8	Azerbaijan	12	1	2	9	6	28	−22	5		1–3	0–2	1–6	1–0	0–1	1–1	Canc.	—

Rules for classification: Qualification tiebreakers

== Results ==
16 August 2006
19:45 CEST

Belgium	0–0	Kazakhstan

Constant Vanden Stock Stadium, Brussels
Attendance: 15,495
Referee: Mark Courtney (Northern Ireland)

2 September 2006
20:15 CEST

Serbia	1–0	Azerbaijan
Žigić 72'

Red Star Stadium, Belgrade
Attendance: 0
Referee: Knut Kircher (Germany)
2 September 2006
20:30 CEST

Poland	1–3	Finland
Garguła 89'		Litmanen 54', 76' (pen.); Väyrynen 84'

Zdzisław Krzyszkowiak Stadium, Bydgoszcz
Attendance: 13,000
Referee: Laurent Duhamel (France)

6 September 2006
19:00 UTC+05:00

Azerbaijan	1–1	Kazakhstan
Ladaga 16'		Byakov 36'

Tofiq Bahramov Republican Stadium, Baku
Attendance: 8,500
Referee: Zsolt Szabo (Hungary)
6 September 2006
21:00 UTC+05:00

Armenia	0–1	Belgium
		Van Buyten 41'

Vazgen Sargsyan Republican Stadium, Yerevan
Attendance: 4,122
Referee: Gerald Lehner (Austria)
6 September 2006
20:00 EEST

Finland	1–1	Portugal
Johansson 22'		Nuno Gomes 42'

Olympic Stadium, Helsinki
Attendance: 38,015
Referee: Konrad Plautz (Austria)
6 September 2006
20:30 CEST

Poland	1–1	Serbia
Matusiak 30'		Lazović 71'

Stadion Wojska Polskiego, Warsaw
Attendance: 4,918
Referee: Graham Poll (England)

7 October 2006
21:00 UTC+06:00

Kazakhstan	0–1	Poland
		Smolarek 52'

Almaty Central Stadium, Almaty
Attendance: 22,000
Referee: Edo Trivkovic (Croatia)
7 October 2006
21:00 UTC+05:00

Armenia	0–0	Finland

Vazgen Sargsyan Republican Stadium, Yerevan
Attendance: 2,800
Referee: Damir Skomina (Slovenia)
7 October 2006
20:15 CEST

Serbia	1–0	Belgium
Žigić 54'

Red Star Stadium, Belgrade
Attendance: 16,901
Referee: Domenico Messina (Italy)
7 October 2006
21:00 WEST

Portugal	3–0	Azerbaijan
Ronaldo 25', 63'; Carvalho 31'

Bessa XXI, Porto
Attendance: 14,000
Referee: Mark Halsey (England)

11 October 2006
22:00 UTC+06:00

Kazakhstan	0–2	Finland
		Litmanen 29'; Hyypiä 64'

Almaty Central Stadium, Almaty
Attendance: 17,863
Referee: Athanassios Briakos (Greece)
11 October 2006
20:15 CEST

Serbia	3–0	Armenia
Stanković 54' (pen.); Lazović 62'; Žigić 90+2'

Red Star Stadium, Belgrade
Attendance: 10,987
Referee: Georgios Kasnaferis (Greece)
11 October 2006
20:30 CEST

Poland	2–1	Portugal
Smolarek 9', 18'		Nuno Gomes 90+2'

Silesian Stadium, Chorzów
Attendance: 38,199
Referee: Wolfgang Stark (Germany)
11 October 2006
20:45 CEST

Belgium	3–0	Azerbaijan
Simons 24' (pen.); Vandenbergh 47'; Dembélé 82'

Constant Vanden Stock Stadium, Brussels
Attendance: 11,917
Referee: Romans Lajuks (Latvia)

15 November 2006
19:00 EET

Finland	1–0	Armenia
Nurmela 10'

Telia 5G -areena, Helsinki
Attendance: 9,445
Referee: Craig Thomson (Scotland)
15 November 2006
20:30 CET

Belgium	0–1	Poland
		Matusiak 19'

King Baudouin Stadium, Brussels
Attendance: 37,578
Referee: Stuart Dougal (Scotland)
15 November 2006
21:00 WET

Portugal	3–0	Kazakhstan
Simão 8', 86'; Ronaldo 30'

Estádio Cidade de Coimbra, Coimbra
Attendance: 27,000
Referee: René Rogalla (Switzerland)

24 March 2007
19:00 UTC+06:00

Kazakhstan	2–1	Serbia
Ashirbekov 47'; Zhumaskaliyev 61'		Žigić 68'

Almaty Central Stadium, Almaty
Attendance: 19,600
Referee: Vladimír Hriňák (Slovakia)
24 March 2007
18:00 CET

Poland	5–0	Azerbaijan
Bąk 3'; Dudka 6'; Łobodziński 34'; Krzynówek 58'; Kaźmierczak 84'

Stadion Wojska Polskiego, Warsaw
Attendance: 12,000
Referee: Kristinn Jakobsson (Iceland)
24 March 2007
21:00 WET

Portugal	4–0	Belgium
Nuno Gomes 53'; Ronaldo 55', 75'; Quaresma 68'

José Alvalade, Lisbon
Attendance: 47,009
Referee: Kyros Vassaras (Greece)

28 March 2007
20:00 UTC+05:00

Azerbaijan	1–0	Finland
Imamaliev 83'

Tofiq Bahramov Republican Stadium, Baku
Attendance: 14,500
Referee: Domenico Messina (Italy)
28 March 2007
20:30 CEST

Poland	1–0	Armenia
Żurawski 26'

Kielce City Stadium, Kielce
Attendance: 13,450
Referee: Alberto Undiano Mallenco (Spain)
28 March 2007
20:30 CEST

Serbia	1–1	Portugal
Janković 37'		Tiago 5'

Red Star Stadium, Belgrade
Attendance: 46,810
Referee: Bertrand Layec (France)

2 June 2007
18:00 UTC+06:00

Kazakhstan	1–2	Armenia
Baltiev 88' (pen.)		Arzumanyan 31'; Hovsepian 39' (pen.)

Almaty Central Stadium, Almaty
Attendance: 17,100
Referee: Pavel Královec (Czech Republic)
2 June 2007
21:00 UTC+05:00

Azerbaijan	1–3	Poland
Subašić 6'		Smolarek 63'; Krzynówek 66', 90'

Tofiq Bahramov Republican Stadium, Baku
Attendance: 25,800
Referee: Costas Kapitanis (Cyprus)
2 June 2007
19:15 EEST

Finland	0–2	Serbia
		Janković 3'; Jovanović 86'

Olympic Stadium, Helsinki
Attendance: 33,615
Referee: Manuel Mejuto González (Spain)
2 June 2007
20:45 CEST

Belgium	1–2	Portugal
Fellaini 55'		Nani 43'; Postiga 64'

King Baudouin Stadium, Brussels
Attendance: 45,383
Referee: Martin Hansson (Sweden)

6 June 2007
19:00 UTC+06:00

Kazakhstan	1–1	Azerbaijan
Baltiev 53'		Nadirov 30'

Almaty Central Stadium, Almaty
Attendance: 11,800
Referee: Albert Toussaint (Luxembourg)
6 June 2007
20:15 EEST

Finland	2–0	Belgium
Johansson 27'; A. Eremenko 71'

Olympic Stadium, Helsinki
Attendance: 34,818
Referee: Mike Riley (England)
6 June 2007
20:30 UTC+05:00

Armenia	1–0	Poland
Hamlet Mkhitaryan 66'

Vazgen Sargsyan Republican Stadium, Yerevan
Attendance: 9,800
Referee: Cristian Balaj (Romania)

22 August 2007
19:00 UTC+05:00

Armenia	1–1	Portugal
Arzumanyan 10'		Ronaldo 37'

Vazgen Sargsyan Republican Stadium, Yerevan
Attendance: 14,935
Referee: Claus Bo Larsen (Denmark)
22 August 2007
19:00 EEST

Finland	2–1	Kazakhstan
A. Eremenko 13'; Tainio 61'		Byakov 23'

Tampere Stadium, Tampere
Attendance: 13,047
Referee: Viktor Kassai (Hungary)
22 August 2007
20:45 CEST

Belgium	3–2	Serbia
Dembélé 10', 88'; Mirallas 30'		Kuzmanović 73', 90+1'

King Baudouin Stadium, Brussels
Attendance: 19,202
Referee: Terje Hauge (Norway)

8 September 2007

Azerbaijan	Cancelled	Armenia

8 September 2007
20:15 CEST

Serbia	0–0	Finland

Red Star Stadium, Belgrade
Attendance: 10,530
Referee: Eric Braamhaar (Netherlands)
8 September 2007
21:00 WEST

Portugal	2–2	Poland
Maniche 50'; Ronaldo 73'		Lewandowski 44'; Krzynówek 88'

Estádio da Luz, Lisbon
Attendance: 48,000
Referee: Roberto Rosetti (Italy)

12 September 2007

Armenia	Cancelled	Azerbaijan

12 September 2007
21:00 UTC+06:00

Kazakhstan	2–2	Belgium
Byakov 39'; Smakov 77' (pen.)		Geraerts 13'; Mirallas 24'

Almaty Central Stadium, Almaty
Attendance: 18,100
Referee: Alexandru Tudor (Romania)
12 September 2007
19:00 EEST

Finland	0–0	Poland

Olympic Stadium, Helsinki
Attendance: 34,088
Referee: Herbert Fandel (Germany)
12 September 2007
21:00 WEST

Portugal	1–1	Serbia
Simão 11'		Ivanović 88'

Estádio José Alvalade, Lisbon
Attendance: 47,000
Referee: Markus Merk (Germany)

13 October 2007
20:00 UTC+05:00

Armenia	0–0	Serbia

Vazgen Sargsyan Republican Stadium, Yerevan
Attendance: 7,150
Referee: Stefan Johannesson (Sweden)
13 October 2007
21:00 UTC+05:00

Azerbaijan	0–2	Portugal
		Bruno Alves 12'; Almeida 45'

Tofiq Bahramov Republican Stadium, Baku
Attendance: 29,300
Referee: Ivan Bebek (Croatia)
13 October 2007
20:30 CEST

Poland	3–1	Kazakhstan
Smolarek 56', 64', 65'		Byakov 20'

Stadion Wojska Polskiego, Warsaw
Attendance: 11,040
Referee: Espen Berntsen (Norway)
13 October 2007
20:45 CEST

Belgium	0–0	Finland

King Baudouin Stadium, Brussels
Attendance: 21,393
Referee: Costas Kapitanis (Cyprus)

17 October 2007
20:00 UTC+06:00

Kazakhstan	1–2	Portugal
Byakov 90+5'		Makukula 84'; Ronaldo 90+1'

Almaty Central Stadium, Almaty
Attendance: 25,057
Referee: Jan Wegereef (Netherlands)
17 October 2007
21:00 UTC+05:00

Azerbaijan	1–6	Serbia
Aliyev 26'		Tošić 4'; Žigić 22', 42'; Janković 41'; Smiljanic 75'; Lazović 84'

Tofiq Bahramov Republican Stadium, Baku
Attendance: 3,100
Referee: Thomas Einwaller (Austria)
17 October 2007
20:45 CEST

Belgium	3–0	Armenia
Sonck 63'; Dembélé 69'; Geraerts 76'

King Baudouin Stadium, Brussels
Attendance: 14,812
Referee: Johannes Valgeirsson (Iceland)

17 November 2007
16:05 EET

Finland	2–1	Azerbaijan
Forssell 79'; Kuqi 86'		Gurbanov 63'

Helsinki Olympic Stadium, Helsinki
Attendance: 10,325
Referee: Alain Hamer (Luxembourg)
17 November 2007
20:30 CET

Poland	2–0	Belgium
Smolarek 45', 49'

Silesian Stadium, Chorzów
Attendance: 41,450
Referee: Claus Bo Larsen (Denmark)
17 November 2007
21:00 WET

Portugal	1–0	Armenia
Almeida 42'

Estádio Dr. Magalhães Pessoa, Leiria
Attendance: 22,048
Referee: Mike Riley (England)

21 November 2007
19:00 UTC+04:00

Armenia	0–1	Kazakhstan
		Ostapenko 64'

Vazgen Sargsyan Republican Stadium, Yerevan
Attendance: 3,100
Referee: Bruno Faye (France)
21 November 2007
21:00 UTC+04:00

Azerbaijan	0–1	Belgium
		Pieroni 52'

Tofiq Bahramov Republican Stadium, Baku
Attendance: 7,000
Referee: Asaf Kenan (Israel)
21 November 2007
19:45 WET

Portugal	0–0	Finland

Estádio do Dragão, Porto
Attendance: 49,000
Referee: Ľuboš Micheľ (Slovakia)
21 November 2007
20:45 CET

Serbia	2–2	Poland
Žigić 68'; Lazović 70'		Murawski 28'; Matusiak 46'

Red Star Stadium, Belgrade
Attendance: 3,247
Referee: Massimo Busacca (Switzerland)

24 November 2007
18:00 CET

Serbia	1–0	Kazakhstan
Ostapenko 79' (o.g.)

Partizan Stadium, Belgrade
Attendance: 400
Referee: Kyros Vassaras (Greece)

== Goalscorers ==
There were 118 goals scored in 54 matches, for an average of 2.19 goals per match.

9 goals

- (Poland national football team) Ebi Smolarek

8 goals

- (Portugal national football team) Cristiano Ronaldo

7 goals

- (Serbia national football team) Nikola Žigić

5 goals

- (Kazakhstan national football team) Dmitry Byakov

4 goals

- (Belgium national football team) Mousa Dembélé
- (Poland national football team) Jacek Krzynówek
- (Serbia national football team) Danko Lazović

3 goals

- (Finland national football team) Jari Litmanen
- (Poland national football team) Radosław Matusiak
- (Portugal national football team) Nuno Gomes
- (Portugal national football team) Simão
- (Serbia national football team) Boško Janković

2 goals

- (Armenia national football team) Robert Arzumanyan
- (Belgium national football team) Karel Geraerts
- (Belgium national football team) Kevin Mirallas
- (Finland national football team) Alexei Eremenko
- (Finland national football team) Jonatan Johansson
- (Kazakhstan national football team) Ruslan Baltiev
- (Portugal national football team) Hugo Almeida
- (Serbia national football team) Zdravko Kuzmanović

1 goal

- (Armenia national football team) Sargis Hovsepyan
- (Armenia national football team) Hamlet Mkhitaryan
- (Azerbaijan national football team) Samir Aliyev
- (Azerbaijan national football team) Emin Imamaliev
- (Azerbaijan national football team) André Luiz Ladaga
- (Azerbaijan national football team) Vüqar Nadirov
- (Azerbaijan national football team) Mahmud Qurbanov
- (Azerbaijan national football team) Branimir Subašić
- (Belgium national football team) Marouane Fellaini
- (Belgium national football team) Luigi Pieroni
- (Belgium national football team) Timmy Simons
- (Belgium national football team) Wesley Sonck
- (Belgium national football team) Daniel Van Buyten
- (Belgium national football team) Kevin Vandenbergh
- (Finland national football team) Mikael Forssell
- (Finland national football team) Sami Hyypiä
- (Finland national football team) Shefki Kuqi
- (Finland national football team) Mika Nurmela
- (Finland national football team) Teemu Tainio
- (Finland national football team) Mika Väyrynen
- (Kazakhstan national football team) Kairat Ashirbekov
- (Kazakhstan national football team) Sergei Ostapenko
- (Kazakhstan national football team) Samat Smakov
- (Kazakhstan national football team) Nurbol Zhumaskaliyev
- (Poland national football team) Jacek Bąk
- (Poland national football team) Dariusz Dudka
- (Poland national football team) Łukasz Garguła
- (Poland national football team) Przemysław Kaźmierczak
- (Poland national football team) Mariusz Lewandowski
- (Poland national football team) Wojciech Łobodziński
- (Poland national football team) Rafał Murawski
- (Poland national football team) Maciej Żurawski
- (Portugal national football team) Bruno Alves
- (Portugal national football team) Ricardo Carvalho
- (Portugal national football team) Ariza Makukula
- (Portugal national football team) Maniche
- (Portugal national football team) Nani
- (Portugal national football team) Hélder Postiga
- (Portugal national football team) Ricardo Quaresma
- (Portugal national football team) Tiago
- (Serbia national football team) Branislav Ivanović
- (Serbia national football team) Milan Jovanović
- (Serbia national football team) Milan Smiljanić
- (Serbia national football team) Dejan Stanković
- (Serbia national football team) Duško Tošić

1 own goal

- (Kazakhstan national football team) Sergei Ostapenko (against Serbia)
