= Rafał Murawski =

Polish footballer (born 1981)

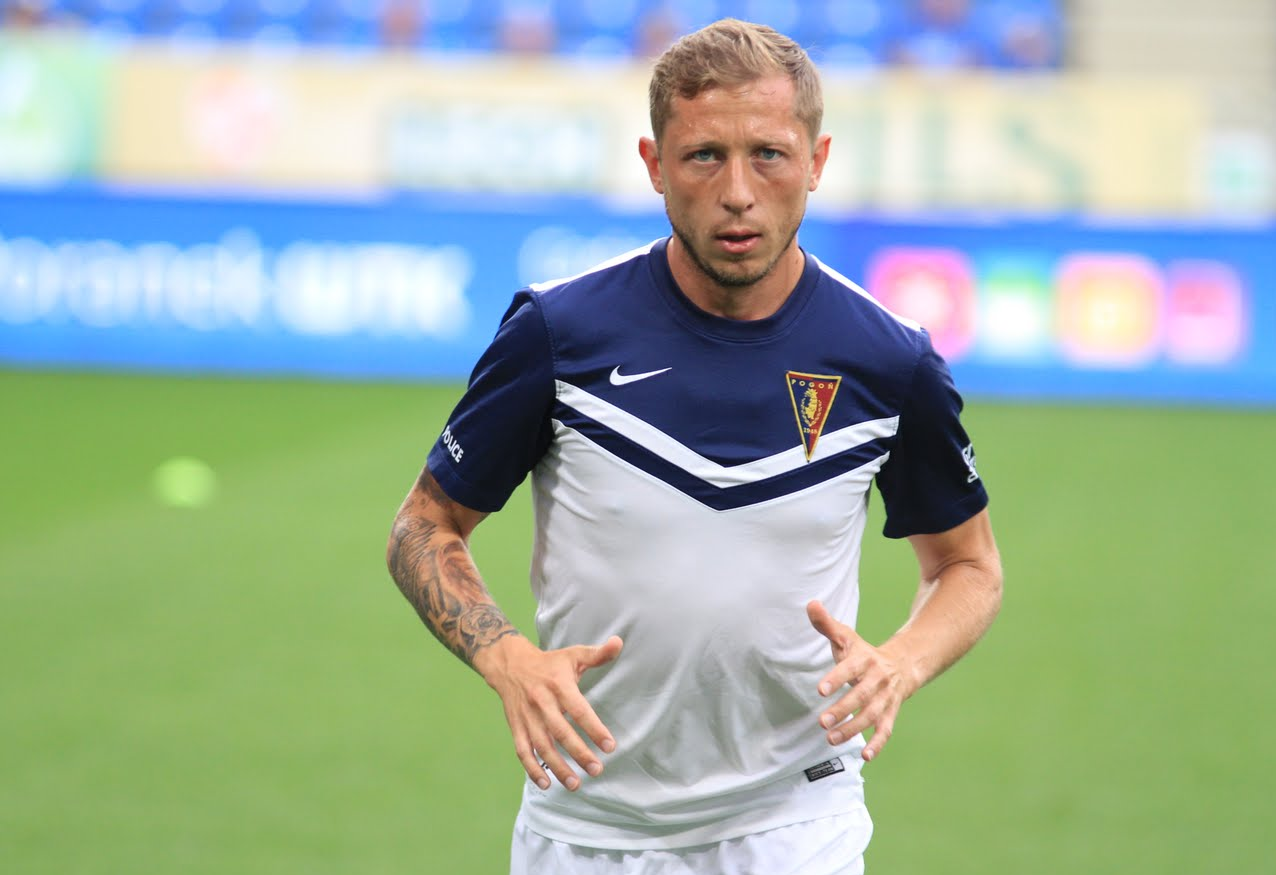
- Murawski with Pogoń Szczecin in 2015

Personal information
- Date of birth: 9 October 1981 (age 45)
- Place of birth: Malbork, Poland
- Height: 1.75 m (5 ft 9 in)
- Position: Midfielder

Team information
- Current team: AP 16 Gdynia
- Number: 16

Senior career*
Years	Team	Apps	(Gls)
–1999	MRKS Gdańsk		
1999	Gedania Gdańsk		
2000–2004	Arka Gdynia	73	(8)
2005–2006	Amica Wronki	40	(3)
2006–2009	Lech Poznań	83	(8)
2009–2010	Rubin Kazan	30	(1)
2011–2014	Lech Poznań	79	(7)
2013	Lech Poznań II	1	(0)
2014–2018	Pogoń Szczecin	138	(17)
2017	Pogoń Szczecin II	1	(0)
2024–	AP 16 Gdynia	23	(6)

International career
2006–2012	Poland	48	(1)
- * Club domestic league appearances and goals as of 17:02, 30 June 2026 (UTC)

Rafał Murawski (Polish pronunciation: [ˈrafaw muˈrafskʲi], born 9 October 1981) is a Polish professional footballer who plays as a midfielder for Klasa B club Akademia Piłkarska 16 Gdynia, of which he is the founder.

== Club career ==
Murawski was born in Malbork. While spending his youth club time mostly in Gdańsk, he signed his first senior contract with Arka Gdynia, where he spent four successful years.

In early 2005, he moved to Amica Wronki. In July 2006, he moved to Lech Poznań after their merger with Amica.

In the summer of 2009, he moved to Russian club Rubin Kazan on a three-year contract. However, in August 2011, he returned to Lech Poznań and signed a three-and-a-half-year contract.

== International career ==
He made his debut on 15 November 2006 in the Euro 2008 qualifier match, against Belgium in Brussels. Almost exactly one year later on 21 November 2007, he also scored his first goal for Poland during the Euro 2008 qualifier match against and in Serbia. He played for Poland in all three games during Euro 2012.

== Career statistics ==
=== Club ===
As of match played 5 October 2025

Appearances and goals by club, season and competition
Club	Season	League			National cup (Note: Includes Polish Cup, Russian Cup)		Europe		Other		Total	
Club	Season	Division	Apps	Goals	Apps	Goals	Apps	Goals	Apps	Goals	Apps	Goals
Arka Gdynia	2001–02	II liga	0	0	0	0	—		2 (Note: Appearances in Polish League Cup)	0	2	0
Arka Gdynia	2002–03	II liga	28	7	1	0	—		—		29	7
Arka Gdynia	2003–04	II liga	30	0	3	1	—		2 (Note: Appearances in II liga promotion play-offs)	0	35	1
Arka Gdynia	2004–05	II liga	15	1	5	0	—		—		20	1
Arka Gdynia	Total		73	8	9	1	—		4	0	86	9
Amica Wronki	2004–05	Ekstraklasa	10	1	2	0	—		—		12	1
Amica Wronki	2005–06	Ekstraklasa	30	2	3	0	—		—		33	2
Amica Wronki	Total		40	3	5	0	—		—		45	3
Lech Poznań	2006–07	Ekstraklasa	30	2	4	0	2 (Note: Appearances in UEFA Intertoto Cup)	0	2 (Note: Appearance(s) in Ekstraklasa Cup)	0	38	2
Lech Poznań	2007–08	Ekstraklasa	29	2	1	0	—		1	0	31	2
Lech Poznań	2008–09	Ekstraklasa	24	4	6	1	10 (Note: Appearances in UEFA Cup/Europa League)	2	—		40	7
Lech Poznań	Total		83	8	11	1	12	2	3	0	109	11
Rubin Kazan	2009	Russian Premier League	7	1	0	0	3 (Note: Appearances in UEFA Champions League)	0	—		10	1
Rubin Kazan	2010	Russian Premier League	23	0	1	0	7 (Note: Three appearances in UEFA Champions League, four appearances in UEFA Europa League)	0	—		31	0
Rubin Kazan	Total		30	1	1	0	10	0	—		41	1
Lech Poznań	2010–11	Ekstraklasa	14	0	5	0	—		—		19	0
Lech Poznań	2011–12	Ekstraklasa	27	2	3	0	—		—		30	2
Lech Poznań	2012–13	Ekstraklasa	29	3	0	0	6	1	—		35	4
Lech Poznań	2013–14	Ekstraklasa	9	2	1	0	0	0	—		10	2
Lech Poznań	Total		79	7	9	0	6	1	—		94	8
Lech Poznań II	2013–14	III liga, gr. C	1	0	—		—		—		1	0
Pogoń Szczecin	2013–14	Ekstraklasa	13	0	0	0	—		—		13	0
Pogoń Szczecin	2014–15	Ekstraklasa	36	3	2	0	—		—		38	3
Pogoń Szczecin	2015–16	Ekstraklasa	36	7	1	0	—		—		37	7
Pogoń Szczecin	2016–17	Ekstraklasa	30	7	5	0	—		—		35	7
Pogoń Szczecin	2017–18	Ekstraklasa	23	0	1	0	—		—		24	0
Pogoń Szczecin	Total		138	17	9	0	—		—		147	17
Pogoń Szczecin II	2017–18	III liga, gr. II	1	0	—		—		—		1	0
AP 16 Gdynia	2024–25	Klasa B	18	6	—		—		—		18	6
AP 16 Gdynia	2025–26	Klasa B	5	0	—		—		—		5	0
AP 16 Gdynia	Total		23	6	—		—		—		23	6
Career total			468	50	44	2	28	3	7	0	547	55

=== International ===
Appearances and goals by national team and year
National team	Year	Apps	Goals
Poland	2006	2	0
Poland	2007	3	1
Poland	2008	11	0
Poland	2009	5	0
Poland	2010	8	0
Poland	2011	11	0
Poland	2012	8	0
Total		48	1

Scores and results list Poland's goal tally first, score column indicates score after each Murawski goal.

List of international goals scored by Rafał Murawski
No.	Date	Venue	Opponent	Score	Result	Competition
1	21 November 2007	Red Star Stadium, Belgrade, Serbia	Serbia	1–0	2–2	UEFA Euro 2008 qualification

== Honours ==
Lech Poznań

- Polish Cup: 2008–09

Rubin Kazan

- Russian Premier League: 2009

Individual

- Ekstraklasa Midfielder of the Season: 2015–16
- Ekstraklasa Player of the Month: February 2016
