= Mariusz Lewandowski =

Polish footballer and manager

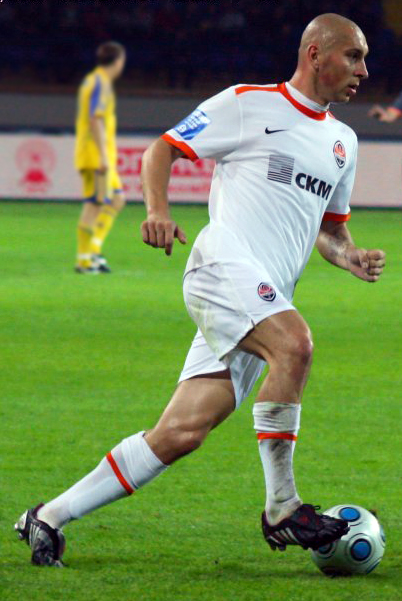
- Lewandowski with Shakhtar Donetsk

Personal information
- Full name: Mariusz Lewandowski
- Date of birth: 18 May 1979 (age 47)
- Place of birth: Legnica, Poland
- Height: 1.84 m (6 ft 0 in)
- Positions: Centre-back; defensive midfielder

Youth career
- Zagłębie Lubin

Senior career*
Years	Team	Apps	(Gls)
1996–1999	Zagłębie Lubin	37	(0)
2000–2001	Dyskobolia Grodzisk	40	(2)
2001–2010	Shakhtar Donetsk	174	(21)
2001–2002	→ Shakhtar-2 Donetsk	6	(0)
2010–2013	Sevastopol	76	(14)
Total		333	(37)

International career
2002–2013	Poland	66	(5)

Managerial career
- 2017–2018: Zagłębie Lubin
- 2020–2021: Bruk-Bet Termalica
- 2022–2023: Radomiak Radom
- 2023–2024: Bruk-Bet Termalica
- * Club domestic league appearances and goals

Mariusz Lewandowski (Polish pronunciation: [ˈmarjuʂ lɛvanˈdɔfski]; born 18 May 1979) is a Polish professional football manager and former player. He was most recently in charge of Polish I liga club Bruk-Bet Termalica Nieciecza.

He mainly played as a centre-back, but could also play as a defensive midfielder. He spent the majority of his club career with Ukrainian side Shakhtar Donetsk, with whom he won the UEFA Cup, five Ukrainian Premier League titles and 3 Ukrainian Cups. In 2009, he was named Polish Footballer of the Year.

== Club career ==
Born in Legnica, Lewandowski started his career with the Polish club Zagłębie Lubin in 1996.

After a short time in Dyskobolia Grodzisk, he was bought by Ukrainian Premier League club Shakhtar Donetsk in 2001. For nine seasons, Lewandowski was an integral part of the team, which won 5 Ukrainian Championships and 3 Ukrainian Cups during his spell in Donetsk. On 20 May 2009, he played in the final of the UEFA Cup against Werder Bremen, with Shakhtar claiming the trophy.

In July 2010, he signed with fellow Ukrainian Premier League side PFC Sevastopol. On 27 November 2013, he left the Crimean club.

On 24 September 2014, after remaining a free agent for 10 months, he announced his retirement.

== International career ==
He was named in the 23-man Poland's 2006 World Cup squad held in Germany. He was also a member of the Poland squad at Euro 2008.

After Franciszek Smuda took over the national team in 2009, he stopped playing for Poland.

He was however, called up by Waldemar Fornalik in October 2013 for the matches against Ukraine and England in the qualification campaign for the World Cup.

== Coaching career ==
On 28 November 2017, Lewandowski took over as head coach of Zagłębie Lubin, replacing Piotr Stokowiec, who had been dismissed the day before. Due to the team's poor results in the autumn round of the 2018–19 season and the Polish Cup, Zagłębie Lubin dismissed Lewandowski from his position as head coach on 29 October 2018.

On 8 January 2020, Lewandowski took up the position of head coach of I liga club Bruk-Bet Termalica Nieciecza, a position he held until 13 December 2021. From 25 April 2022 to 16 April 2023, he managed Radomiak Radom in the Ekstraklasa. On 16 June 2023, after less than three and a half years since his last appointment, he returned to Bruk-Bet Termalica. On 11 March 2024, his dismissal was announced due to unsatisfactory results.

== Career statistics ==
=== Club ===
Appearances and goals by club, season and competition
Club	Season	League			National cup (Note: Includes Polish Cup, Ukrainian Cup)		Europe		Other		Total	
Club	Season	Division	Apps	Goals	Apps	Goals	Apps	Goals	Apps	Goals	Apps	Goals
Zagłębie	1996–97	Ekstraklasa	2	0	—		1 (Note: Appearance(s) in UEFA Intertoto Cup)	0	—		3	0
Zagłębie	1997–98	Ekstraklasa	11	0	—		—		—		11	0
Zagłębie	1998–99	Ekstraklasa	21	0	1	0	—		—		22	0
Zagłębie	1999–2000	Ekstraklasa	3	0	0	0	—		1 (Note: Appearance in Polish League Cup)	0	4	0
Zagłębie	Total		37	0	1	0	1	0	1	0	40	0
Dyskobolia	1999–2000	Ekstraklasa	14	0	—		—		—		14	0
Dyskobolia	2000–01	Ekstraklasa	26	2	1	0	—		1	0	28	2
Dyskobolia	2001–02	Ekstraklasa	—		—		2	0	—		2	0
Dyskobolia	Total		40	2	1	0	2	0	1	0	44	2
Shakhtar	2001–02	Ukrainian Premier League	11	1	5	1	2 (Note: Appearances in UEFA Champions League)	0	—		18	2
Shakhtar	2002–03	Ukrainian Premier League	24	4	6	1	4 (Note: Two appearances in UEFA Champions League, two appearances and one goal in UEFA Cup)	1	—		34	6
Shakhtar	2003–04	Ukrainian Premier League	27	5	6	1	6 (Note: Four appearances and one goal in UEFA Champions League, two appearances in UEFA Cup)	1	—		39	7
Shakhtar	2004–05	Ukrainian Premier League	25	2	8	2	12 (Note: Eight appearances in UEFA Champions League, four appearances in UEFA Cup)	0	1 (Note: Appearance in Ukrainian Super Cup)	1	46	5
Shakhtar	2005–06	Ukrainian Premier League	21	1	2	0	8 (Note: One appearance in UEFA Champions League, seven appearances in UEFA Cup)	0	1	0	32	1
Shakhtar	2006–07	Ukrainian Premier League	18	4	4	0	7 (Note: Five appearances in UEFA Champions League, two appearances in UEFA Cup)	0	0	0	29	4
Shakhtar	2007–08	Ukrainian Premier League	18	1	2	1	9	0	0	0	29	2
Shakhtar	2008–09	Ukrainian Premier League	16	1	4	1	10 (Note: Two appearances in UEFA Champions League, eight appearances in UEFA Cup)	0	0	0	30	2
Shakhtar	2009–10	Ukrainian Premier League	14	2	1	0	4 (Note: Appearances in UEFA Europa League)	0	—		19	2
Shakhtar	Total		174	21	38	7	62	2	2	1	276	31
Sevastopol	2010–11	Ukrainian Premier League	25	6	—		—		—		25	6
Sevastopol	2011–12	Ukrainian First League	7	2	—		—		—		7	2
Sevastopol	2012–13	Ukrainian First League	28	4	5	0	—		—		33	4
Sevastopol	2013–14	Ukrainian Premier League	16	2	0	0	—		—		16	2
Sevastopol	Total		76	14	5	0	—		—		81	14
Career total			327	37	45	7	65	2	4	1	441	47

=== International ===
Appearances and goals by national team and year
National team	Year	Apps	Goals
Poland	2002	5	0
Poland	2003	6	0
Poland	2004	7	0
Poland	2005	5	1
Poland	2006	7	0
Poland	2007	12	1
Poland	2008	14	2
Poland	2009	8	1
Poland	2013	2	0
Total		66	5

Scores and results list Poland's goal tally first, score column indicates score after each Lewandowski goal.

List of international goals scored by Mariusz Lewandowski
No.	Date	Venue	Opponent	Score	Result	Competition
1	16 November 2005	Ostrowiec Świętokrzyski, Poland	Estonia	1–0	3–1	Friendly
2	8 September 2007	Lisbon, Portugal	Portugal	1–0	2–2	UEFA Euro 2008 qualifying
3	6 February 2008	Paphos, Cyprus	Czech Republic	2–0	2–0	Friendly
4	19 November 2008	Dublin, Republic of Ireland	Republic of Ireland	1–0	3–2	Friendly
5	1 April 2009	Kielce, Poland	San Marino	7–0	10–0	2010 FIFA World Cup qualification

== Managerial statistics ==
As of match played 8 March 2024

Managerial record by team and tenure
Team	From	To	Record							
Team	From	To	G	W	D	L	GF	GA	GD	Win %
Zagłębie Lubin	28 November 2017	29 October 2018	35	12	9	14	45	51	−6	34.29
Bruk-Bet Termalica Nieciecza	8 January 2020	13 December 2021	71	30	20	21	102	75	+27	42.25
Radomiak Radom	25 April 2022	16 April 2023	35	12	9	14	40	46	−6	34.29
Bruk-Bet Termalica Nieciecza	16 June 2023	11 March 2024	25	8	8	9	43	39	+4	32.00
Total			166	62	46	58	230	211	+19	37.35

== Honours ==
Shakhtar Donetsk

- UEFA Cup: 2008–09
- Ukrainian Premier League: 2001–02, 2004–05, 2005–06, 2007–08, 2009–10
- Ukrainian Cup: 2001–02, 2003–04, 2007–08
- Ukrainian Super Cup: 2005, 2008, 2010

Individual

- Shakhtar Donetsk's All-Time XI
- Polish Footballer of the Year: 2009
