= Paweł Golański =

Polish footballer (born 1982)

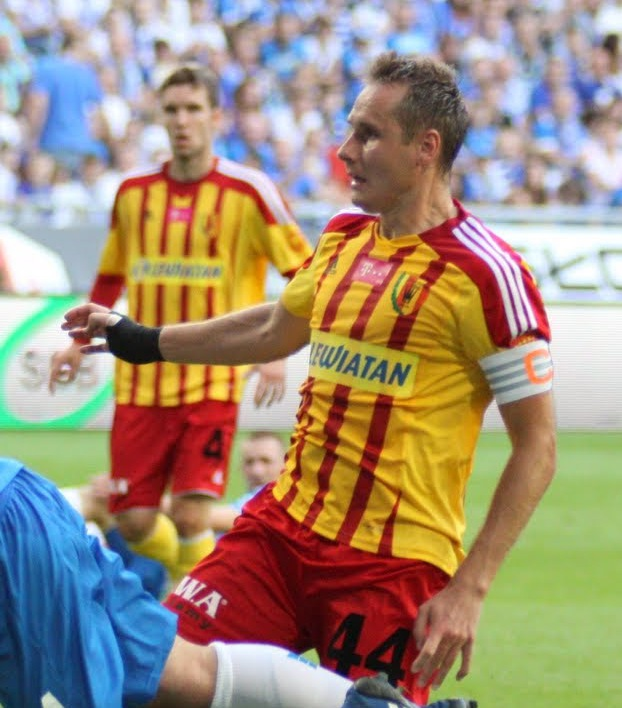
- Golański with Korona Kielce in 2013

Personal information
- Date of birth: 12 October 1982 (age 44)
- Place of birth: Łódź, Poland
- Height: 1.83 m (6 ft 0 in)
- Position: Right-back

Team information
- Current team: Korona Kielce (sporting director)

Youth career
- ŁKS Łódź

Senior career*
Years	Team	Apps	(Gls)
1999–2000	UKS SMS Łódź		
2000–2005	ŁKS Łódź	60	(4)
2003	→ Legia Warsaw II (loan)		
2005–2007	Korona Kielce	48	(3)
2007–2010	Steaua București	58	(2)
2010–2015	Korona Kielce	116	(8)
2011	→ ŁKS Łódź (loan)	7	(0)
2015–2016	ASA Târgu Mureş	13	(0)
2016	Górnik Zabrze	6	(0)
2017	Chojniczanka Chojnice	3	(0)

International career
- Poland U18
2006–2009	Poland	14	(1)
Medal record
Men's football
Representing Poland
UEFA European Under-18 Championship
Winner	2001 Finland
- * Club domestic league appearances and goals

Paweł Golański (born 12 October 1982) is a Polish former professional footballer who played as a right-back. He is currently the sporting director of Ekstraklasa club Korona Kielce.

== Playing career ==
In July 2007, Golański signed a three-year contract with Steaua București, with a reported transfer fee of around €1 million.

In August 2011, he was loaned to ŁKS Łódź on a half-year deal.

== Post-retirement career ==
On 23 April 2021, Golański joined Polish second-tier club Korona Kielce as their new sporting director. He oversaw the club's return to the top-tier in 2022, and two close escapes from relegation, before leaving Korona on 12 June 2024.

On 9 October 2024, Golański was appointed sporting director of Ekstraklasa side Motor Lublin. In October 2025, Motor chairman Zbigniew Jakubas announced Golański would leave the club at the end of the year.

On 28 May 2026, Korona Kielce announced Golański would return to the role of the club's sporting director starting from 1 June.

== Career statistics ==
=== International ===
Appearances and goals by national team and year
National team	Year	Apps	Goals
Poland
Poland	2006	4	0
Poland	2007	4	1
Poland	2008	5	0
Poland	2009	1	0
Total		14	1

Scores and results list Poland's goal tally first, score column indicates score after each Golański goal.

List of international goals scored by Paweł Golański
No.	Date	Venue	Cap	Opponent	Score	Result	Competition
1	3 February 2007	Estadio Municipal de Chapín, Jerez de la Frontera, Spain	5	Estonia	4–0	4–0	Friendly

== Honours ==
ASA Târgu Mureș

- Romanian Supercup: 2015

Poland U18

- UEFA European Under-18 Championship: 2001
