= 2008–09 Legia Warsaw season =

Legia Warsaw
2008–09 season
- Chairman: Leszek Miklas
- Manager: Jan Urban
- Orange Ekstraklasa: 2nd
- Polish Cup: Semifinals
- UEFA Cup: Second Qualifying Round

During the 2008-09 Season, Legia Warsaw participated in the Polish first division, the Ekstraklasa.

== Transfers ==
=== In ===
Date	Player	Previous Club	Cost
25 March 2008	(Ukraine) Konstatin Makhnovskyy	ŁKS Łódź	Free transfer
23 May 2008	(Zimbabwe) Takesure Chinyama	Monomotapa United	€300,000
29 May 2008	(Poland) Piotr Giza	Cracovia	Undisclosed
30 May 2008	(Poland) Piotr Rocki	Dyskobolia	Undisclosed
10 June 2008	(North Macedonia) Panče Kumbev	Dyskobolia	Free transfer
10 June 2008	(Spain) Mikel Arruabarrena	CD Tenerife	Free transfer
20 June 2008	(Poland) Maciej Iwanski	Zagłębie Lubin	€650,000
2 July 2008	(Spain) Tito	Espanyol Barcelona	Loan
20 July 2008	(Spain) Inaki Astiz	CA Osasuna	Free transfer
January 2009	(Poland) Tomasz Jarzębowski	GKS Bełchatów	Undisclosed
January 2009	(Poland) Krzysztof Ostrowski	Śląsk Wrocław	Undisclosed
January 2009	(Poland) Kamil Majkowski	Wisła Płock	Loan return
January 2009	(Poland) Adrian Paluchowski	Znicz Pruszków	Loan return
February 2009	(Poland) Patryk Koziara	Legia Warsaw youth	None
			Total
			€950,000

=== Out ===
Date	Player	New Club	Cost
23 May 2008	(Spain) Antonio Aguilera Balbino		Contract termination
15 June 2008	(Spain) Inaki Astiz	Osasuna	Loan return
20 June 2008	(Poland) Maciej Korzym	Odra	Loan
30 July 2008	(Poland) Maciej Gostomski	Zagłębie Sosnowiec	Loan
August 2008	(Poland) Wojciech Wocial	Znicz Pruszków	Loan
August 2008	(Poland) Artur Jędrzejczyk	Dolcan Ząbki	Loan
August 2008	(Poland) Wojciech Trochim	Dolcan Ząbki	Loan
August 2008	(Poland) Błażej Augustyn	Rimini Calcio F.C.	Loan
January 2009	(Spain) Mikel Arruabarrena	SD Eibar	Loan
January 2009	(Poland) Piotr Bronowicki	Piast Gliwice	End of contract
January 2009	(Poland) Jakub Wawrzyniak	Panathinaikos	Undisclosed
January 2009	(Poland) Przemysław Wysocki	Piast Gliwice	Loan
January 2009	(Poland) Kamil Grosicki	Jagiellonia Białystok	Loan
January 2009	(Brazil) Edson Luis da Silva	Clube Náutico Capibaribe	Undisclosed
January 2009	(Serbia) Aleksandar Vuković	Iraklis	Undisclosed
January 2009	(Poland) Marcin Smoliński	ŁKS Łódź	Undisclosed
			Total
			TBC

== Squad ==
As of 18 February 2009. Note: Flags indicate national team as defined under FIFA eligibility rules; some limited exceptions apply. Players may hold more than one non-FIFA nationality.

No.	Pos.	Nation	Player
1	GK	POL	Wojciech Skaba
2	DF	ESP	Iñaki Descarga
3	DF	POL	Wojciech Szala
4	DF	ZIM	Dickson Choto
5	MF	ESP	Tito
6	MF	POL	Roger
7	MF	POL	Piotr Giza
8	MF	POL	Maciej Iwański
9	FW	POL	Bartłomiej Grzelak
11	DF	POL	Tomasz Kiełbowicz
12	GK	UKR	Konstatin Makhnovskyy
15	DF	ESP	Inaki Astiz
16	MF	POL	Ariel Borysiuk
18	MF	POL	Kamil Majkowski

No.	Pos.	Nation	Player
19	FW	ZIM	Takesure Chinyama
20	MF	POL	Sebastian Szałachowski
22	FW	POL	Piotr Rocki
23	FW	POL	Adrian Paluchowski
24	MF	POL	Patryk Koziara
25	DF	POL	Jakub Rzeźniczak
26	DF	MKD	Panče Kumbev
30	MF	NGA	Martins Ekwueme
31	MF	POL	Maciej Rybus
32	MF	SRB	Miroslav Radović
46	MF	POL	Krzysztof Ostrowski
78	MF	POL	Tomasz Jarzębowski
82	GK	SVK	Ján Mucha

== Match results ==
=== Friendlies ===
Date	Opponents	Home (H)/ Away (A)	Result	Scorers	Attendance
8 July 2008	FC Luzern	A	1-1	Grzelak	TBC
10 July 2008	FC Basel	A	1-6	Iwański	TBC
26 July 2008	Legia Warszawa Reserve Team	H	3-1	Szałachowski; 2xGrzelak	TBC
26 July 2008	Dolcan Ząbki	H	2-0	2xGrzelak	TBC
2 August 2008	Jagiellonia Białystok	H	0-2		TBC

=== Ekstraklasa ===
Date	Opponents	Home (H)/ Away (A)	Result	Scorers	Attendance
8 August	Polonia Warszawa	H	2-2	Grzelak; Iwański	7500
15 August	Odra	A	0-2		5,000
22 August	Jagiellonia Białystok	H	2-0	2xRadović	4,000
29 August	Górnik Zabrze	A	3-0	Chinyama; Szałachowski; Roger	17,000
12 September	Arka Gdynia	H	2-0	Chinyama; Radović	4,000
19 September	Cracovia	A	3-0	Roger; Chinyama; Giza	2,500
26 September	Piast Gliwice	H	3-1	Edson o.gGlik; Chiyama	5,000
3 October	Lech Poznań	A	0-0		24,000
17 October	ŁKS Łódź	A	0-0		5,000
24 October	Wisła Kraków	H	2-1	Grzelak; Chinyama	10,000
30 October	Lechia Gdańsk	H	3-0	2xChinyama; Édson	7,000
November 7	Polonia Bytom	A	0-1		6,000
November 11	GKS Bełchatów	A	0-1		4,500
November 14	Śląsk Wrocław	H	4-0	Iwański; Chinyama; Kumbev; Wawrzyniak	11,000
November 21	Ruch Chorzów	A	1-0	Chinyama	7,000
November 28	Lechia Gdańsk	A	3-2	o.gKosznik; 2xChinyama	11,000
December 5	GKS Bełchatów	H	3-0	Rybus; Chinyama; Giza	5,000
	Polonia Warszawa	A	TBC
	Odra	H	TBC
	Jagiellonia Białystok	A	TBC
	Górnik Zabrze	H	TBC
	Arka Gdynia	A	TBC
	Cracovia	H	TBC
	Piast Gliwice	A	TBC
	Lech Poznań	H	TBC
	ŁKS Łódź	H	TBC
	Wisła Kraków	A	TBC
	Polonia Bytom	H	TBC
	Śląsk Wrocław	A	TBC
	Ruch Chorzów	H	TBC

=== Polish Super Cup ===
Date	Opponents	Home (H)/ Away (A)	Result	Scorers	Attendance
20 July 2008	Wisła Kraków	N	2-1	Chinyama; Rocki	3,000

=== Polish Cup ===
Round	Date	Opponents	Home (H)/ Away (A)	Result	Scorers	Attendance
1/16	23 September 2008	Wisła Płock	A	2-1 a.e.t	2x Iwański	3,500

=== Puchar Ligi ===
Round	Date	Opponents	Home (H)/ Away (A)	Result	Scorers	Attendance
1, Group D	2 September 2008	Polonia Warszawa	A	0-3 w.o
2, Group D	5 September 2008	ŁKS Łódź	H	3-0	Wawrzyniak; Chinyama; Vuković	700

=== UEFA Cup ===
Round	Date	Opponents	Home (H)/ Away (A)	Result	Scorers	Attendance
First qualifying round	17 July 2008	FC Gomel	H	0-0		6,000
First qualifying round	31 July 2008	FC Gomel	A	1-4	2x Szałachowski; 2x Iwański	8,000

== Player statistics ==
No.	Pos.	Nationality	Player	Apps	Goals	YC	RC
1	GK	Poland	Wojciech Skaba	1	0	0	0
2	DF	Spain	Iñaki Descarga	3	0	0	0
3	DF	Poland	Wojciech Szala	10(1)	0	3	0
4	DF	Zimbabwe	Dickson Choto	19	0	3	0
6	MF	Poland	Roger	26(2)	4	4	0
7	MF	Poland	Piotr Giza	14(8)	5	3	0
8	MF	Poland	Maciej Iwański	29(1)	4	3	0
9	FW	Poland	Bartłomiej Grzelak	5(4)	2	1	0
11	DF	Poland	Tomasz Kiełbowicz	11(3)	0	2	0
12	GK	Ukraine	Konstatin Makhnovskyy	0	0	0	0
14	MF	Serbia	Aleksandar Vuković	6(3)	0	2	0
15	DF	Spain	Inaki Astiz	26	1	4	0
16	MF	Poland	Ariel Borysiuk	13(5)	0	4	0
17	DF	Poland	Marcin Komorowski	5(1)	0	0	0
19	FW	Zimbabwe	Takesure Chinyama	24(2)	19	3	0
20	MF	Poland	Sebastian Szalachowski	5	1	0	0
22	MF	Poland	Piotr Rocki	5(11)	0	1	0
23	DF	Poland	Adrian Paluchowski	4(3)	2	1	0
24	DF	Poland	Jakub Wawrzyniak	16	1	2	0
25	DF	Poland	Jakub Rzeźniczak	23	1	4	0
26	DF	(North Macedonia) Macedonia	Panče Kumbev	7(2)	1	3	0
27	MF	Brazil	Édson	5(2)	2	0	0
28	MF	Poland	Marcin Smoliński	1	0	0	0
30	MF	Nigeria	Martins Ekwueme	1(2)	0	0	0
31	MF	Poland	Maciej Rybus	21(6)	3	2	0
32	MF	Serbia	Miroslav Radović	18(10)	3	2	0
33	FW	Poland	Kamil Majkowski	0(2)	0	0	0
40	FW	Spain	Mikel Arruabarrena	0(5)	0	0	0
46	MF	Poland	Krzysztof Ostrowski	0(5)	0	0	0
78	MF	Poland	Tomasz Jarzebowski	4(3)	0	0	0
82	GK	Slovakia	Ján Mucha	29	0	0	0

- Last Update: Start of 2008/09 season
- Data includes all competitions

=== Top scorers ===
As of 2008/09 Season

P	Player	Position	Ekstraklasa	Polish Cup	Puchat Ligi	UEFA Cup	Total
1	(Zimbabwe) Takesure Chinyama	Forward	4	0	1	0	5
2	(Poland) Maciej Iwański	Midfielder	1	2	0	2	5
3	(Serbia) Miroslav Radović	Midfielder	3	0	0	0	3
4	(Poland) Roger	Midfielder	2	0	0	1	3
5	(Poland) Sebastian Szalachowski	Midfielder	1	0	0	2	3

=== Most assists ===
As of 2008/09 Season

P	Player	Position	Ekstraklasa	Polish Cup	Puchat Ligi	UEFA Cup	Total
1	(Serbia) Miroslav Radović	Midfielder	1	0	0	0	0
2	(Poland) Tomasz Kiełbowicz	Midfielder	0	0	0	1	1
3	(Poland) Jakub Rzeźniczak	Forward	0	0	0	1	1
4	(Poland) Maciej Iwański	Midfielder	0	0	0	0	0
5	(Poland) Sebastian Szałachowski	Forward	0	0	0	0	0

=== Most appearances ===
As of 2008/09 Season

P	Player	Position	Ekstraklasa	Polish Cup	Puchar Ligi	UEFA Cup	Total
1	(Slovakia) Ján Mucha	Goalkeeper	1	0	0	2	3
2	(Poland) Roger	Midfielder	1	0	0	2	3
3	(Poland) Maciej Iwański	Forward	1	0	0	2	3
4	(Serbia) Miroslav Radović	Midfielder	1	0	0	2	3
5	(Poland) Wojciech Szala	Midfielder	1	0	0	2	3
