= Miroslav Radović =

Serbian footballer (born 1984)

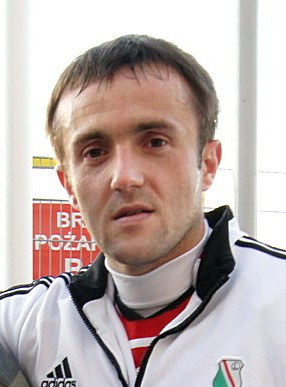
- Radović with Legia Warsaw in 2011

Personal information
- Date of birth: 16 January 1984 (age 42)
- Place of birth: Goražde, SFR Yugoslavia
- Height: 1.82 m (6 ft 0 in)
- Position: Winger

Youth career
- Mladost Rogatica
- 2001–2003: Partizan

Senior career*
Years	Team	Apps	(Gls)
2003–2006	Partizan	49	(8)
2006–2015	Legia Warsaw	228	(53)
2015	Hebei China Fortune	5	(2)
2016	Olimpija Ljubljana	14	(2)
2016	Partizan	7	(2)
2016–2019	Legia Warsaw	48	(13)
Total		351	(80)

International career
2004–2006	Serbia U21 (Note: Official UEFA matches only)	6	(1)
- * Club domestic league appearances and goals

Miroslav Radović (Serbian Cyrillic: Мирослав Радовић; born 16 January 1984) is a Serbian former professional footballer who played as a winger.

Radović started his career with Partizan, before joining Polish club Legia Warsaw in the summer of 2006. He acquired Polish citizenship in January 2014.

== Club career ==
=== Partizan ===
After signing his first professional contract with Partizan in June 2003, Radović was promoted to the senior squad under manager Lothar Matthäus during the 2003–04 campaign. He also made his UEFA Champions League debut that season, coming on as a substitute for Milivoje Ćirković in a 2–1 away loss against Porto on 26 November 2003. In the following 2004–05 campaign, Radović helped Partizan win the national championship title with an unbeaten record. He also scored a memorable goal in the 88th minute that eliminated Dnipro Dnipropetrovsk in the UEFA Cup round of 32. In the 2005–06 season, Radović made 19 appearances in all competitions, scoring three goals. He eventually left the club in the 2006 summer transfer window.

=== Legia Warsaw ===
On 30 June 2006, Radović signed with Polish club Legia Warsaw on a four-year deal. He made his official debut for the side on 22 July 2006, as they lost their Super Cup match 2–1 to Wisła Płock. On 12 August 2006, Radović scored his first goal for Legia in a 2–1 home league loss to GKS Bełchatów. He made a total of 27 league appearances and scored six goals in his first season at the club. In the following season, Radović won his first trophy with Legia by beating Wisła Kraków in the 2007–08 Polish Cup final after penalties.

In January 2009, Radović signed a new contract with the club until the summer of 2012. He subsequently became one of Legia's key players, being the team's top scorer in the 2010–11 season. In June 2011, Radović extended his contract with Legia on a three-year deal. He scored both of his team's goals in a 2–2 home draw with Spartak Moscow in the first leg of the UEFA Europa League play-off round on 18 August 2011. In Group C's second round, Radović scored an 89th-minute winning goal in a 3–2 home win over Hapoel Tel Aviv. He also scored three goals in two games against Rapid București, as the club reached the competition's round of 32.

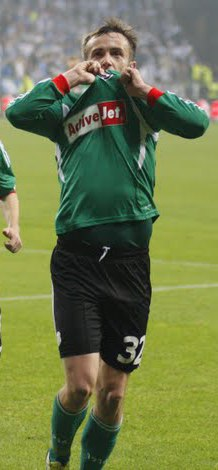
Radović celebrating his goal for Legia in 2012

After seven years of playing in Poland, Radović won his first Ekstraklasa title in the 2012–13 season. He also led the club to the second league title in a row while scoring 14 league goals in the 2013–14 season. On 16 July 2014, Radović scored a 90th minute equalizer in a 1–1 draw with St Patrick's Athletic in the first leg of the UEFA Champions League second qualifying round. He subsequently netted a brace in a 5–0 return leg victory. On 30 July 2014, Radović was the scorer of two goals in his team's 4–1 win over Celtic. However, the club was eliminated in the third qualifying round following a 3–0 forfeit loss at Celtic Park.

=== Hebei China Fortune ===
In February 2015, Radović left Legia after almost nine years and signed a two-year contract with China League One club Hebei China Fortune. He was one of the first acquisitions of newly appointed manager Radomir Antić. However, Radović missed the majority of the 2015 season due to an injury, making only five league appearances and scoring two goals, as the club gained promotion to the Super League.

=== Olimpija Ljubljana ===
On 8 February 2016, Radović signed a one-and-a-half-year contract with Olimpija Ljubljana. He immediately became an important part of the team, helping them win the league title for the first time in the club's history. On 8 June 2016, Radović mutually terminated his contract with the club.

=== Return to Partizan ===
On 15 June 2016, after spending ten years abroad, Radović officially returned to his parent club Partizan. He signed a two-year deal and was given the number 10 shirt. On 14 July 2016, Radović made his second debut for Partizan, playing the full 90 minutes in a 0–0 home draw with Zagłębie Lubin in the first leg of the UEFA Europa League second qualifying round. He scored his first goal upon his return to the club in a 2–0 away league win over Javor Ivanjica on 10 August 2016.

=== Return to Legia Warsaw ===
On 31 August 2016, Radović left Partizan, spending less than three months in his second tenure at the club, and returned to Legia Warsaw on a two-year deal. He converted a penalty in a 5–1 away loss against Real Madrid in Champions League's Group F on 18 October 2016. Two weeks later, Radović scored against the same opponent, this time at home, in an eventual 3–3 draw.

== International career ==
Radović made his debut for the Serbia and Montenegro national under-21 team in their successful qualifying campaign for the 2006 UEFA European Championship. He was omitted from the main 22-man squad for the final tournament held in Portugal. In September 2006, Radović played for the Serbia national under-21 team at the start of the qualifications for the 2007 UEFA European Championship, but again missed out on the final tournament.

== Personal life ==
In June 2014, Radović married his long-time girlfriend Sandra. The couple have three sons: Nikša, Matej and Jakov.

== Career statistics ==
Appearances and goals by club, season and competition
Club	Season	League			National cup (Note: Includes Serbia and Montenegro Cup, Polish Cup)		League cup (Note: Includes Ekstraklasa Cup)		Continental		Other		Total	
Club	Season	Division	Apps	Goals	Apps	Goals	Apps	Goals	Apps	Goals	Apps	Goals	Apps	Goals
Partizan	2003–04	First League of Serbia and Montenegro	18	3	4	1	—		1 (Note: Appearance(s) in UEFA Champions League)	0	—		23	4
Partizan	2004–05	First League of Serbia and Montenegro	19	3	4	0	—		9 (Note: Appearance(s) in UEFA Cup/UEFA Europa League)	1	—		32	4
Partizan	2005–06	First League of Serbia and Montenegro	12	2	2	1	—		5 (Note: Three appearances in UEFA Champions League, two appearances in UEFA Cup)	0	—		19	3
Partizan	Total		49	8	10	2	—		15	1	—		74	11
Legia Warsaw	2006–07	Ekstraklasa	27	6	1	1	4	1	6 (Note: Four appearances in UEFA Champions League, two appearances in UEFA Cup)	0	1 (Note: Appearance in Polish Super Cup)	0	39	8
Legia Warsaw	2007–08	Ekstraklasa	27	3	5	2	5	0	1 (Note: Appearance in UEFA Intertoto Cup)	0	—		38	5
Legia Warsaw	2008–09	Ekstraklasa	28	3	4	0	7	1	4	0	1	0	44	4
Legia Warsaw	2009–10	Ekstraklasa	26	2	4	0	—		3	0	—		33	2
Legia Warsaw	2010–11	Ekstraklasa	28	9	7	0	—		—		—		35	9
Legia Warsaw	2011–12	Ekstraklasa	28	6	5	1	—		9	7	—		42	14
Legia Warsaw	2012–13	Ekstraklasa	27	5	6	0	—		6	1	1	0	40	6
Legia Warsaw	2013–14	Ekstraklasa	27	14	2	0	—		9 (Note: Six appearances and one goal in UEFA Champions League, three appearances in UEFA Europa League)	1	—		38	15
Legia Warsaw	2014–15	Ekstraklasa	10	5	2	2	—		8 (Note: Four appearances and five goals in UEFA Champions League, four appearances and one goal in UEFA Europa League)	6	0	0	20	13
Legia Warsaw	Total		228	53	36	6	16	2	46	15	3	0	329	76
Hebei China Fortune	2015	China League One	5	2	0	0	—		—		—		5	2
Olimpija Ljubljana	2015–16	Slovenian PrvaLiga	14	2	0	0	—		—		—		14	2
Partizan	2016–17	Serbian SuperLiga	7	2	0	0	—		2	0	—		9	2
Legia Warsaw	2016–17	Ekstraklasa	29	11	0	0	—		7 (Note: Six appearances and two goals in UEFA Champions League, one appearance in UEFA Europa League)	2	0	0	36	13
Legia Warsaw	2017–18	Ekstraklasa	11	2	1	0	—		0	0	0	0	12	2
Legia Warsaw	2018–19	Ekstraklasa	8	0	2	0	—		3	1	1	0	14	1
Legia Warsaw	Total		48	13	3	0	—		10	3	1	0	62	16
Career total			351	80	49	8	16	2	73	19	4	0	493	109

== Honours ==
Partizan

- First League of Serbia and Montenegro: 2004–05

Legia Warsaw

- Ekstraklasa: 2012–13, 2013–14, 2016–17, 2017–18
- Polish Cup: 2007–08, 2010–11, 2011–12, 2012–13, 2017–18
- Polish Super Cup: 2008

Olimpija Ljubljana

- Slovenian PrvaLiga: 2015–16

Individual

- Ekstraklasa Player of the Season: 2013–14
- Ekstraklasa Midfielder of the Season: 2013–14
- Ekstraklasa Player of the Year: 2014
- Piłka Nożna Foreigner of the Year: 2011
