= Maciej Rybus =

Polish footballer (born 1989)

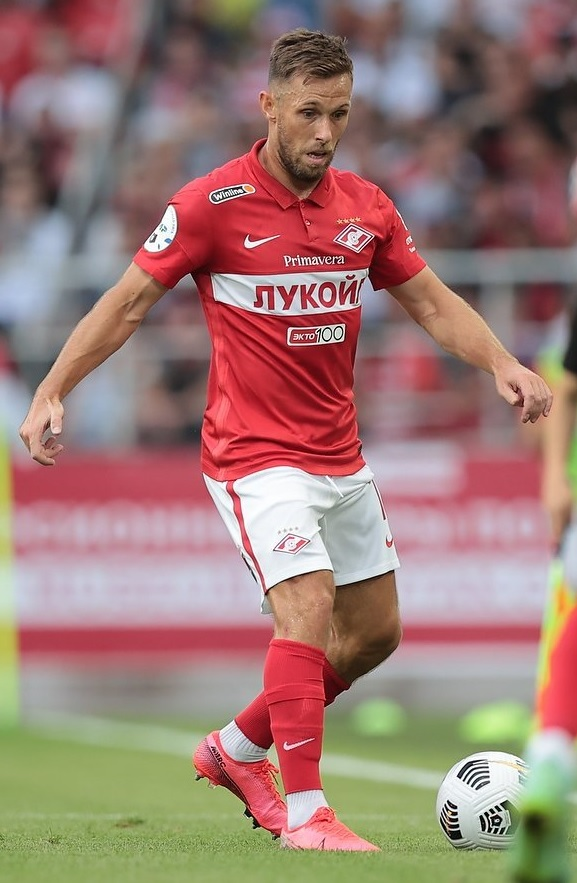
- Rybus playing for Spartak Moscow in 2022

Personal information
- Full name: Maciej Rybus
- Date of birth: 19 August 1989 (age 37)
- Place of birth: Łowicz, Poland
- Height: 1.73 m (5 ft 8 in)
- Position: Left-back

Team information
- Current team: Pelikan Łowicz
- Number: 31

Youth career
- Pelikan Łowicz
- 2006–2007: MSP Szamotuły

Senior career*
Years	Team	Apps	(Gls)
2007–2012	Legia Warsaw	102	(13)
2012–2016	Terek Grozny	101	(19)
2016–2017	Lyon	19	(0)
2017–2022	Lokomotiv Moscow	102	(2)
2022–2023	Spartak Moscow	8	(1)
2023–2024	Rubin Kazan	7	(1)
2026–	Pelikan Łowicz	0	(0)

International career
2008	Poland U19	1	(0)
2008–2009	Poland U21	9	(2)
2009–2021	Poland	66	(2)
- * Club domestic league appearances and goals as of 25 May 2024

Maciej Rybus ([ˈmat͡ɕɛj ˈrɨbus]; born 19 August 1989) is a Polish professional footballer who plays as a left-back for III liga club Pelikan Łowicz.

Having previously represented his country at under-19 and under-21 level, Rybus made his senior debut for Poland in November 2009. He went on to earn over 60 caps, representing his country at two UEFA European Championships (2012 and 2020) and one FIFA World Cup (2018).

== Club career ==
Rybus began his career with Pelikan Łowicz and was sold to MSP Szamotuły in the summer of 2006, where he played for only one season and was then scouted by Legia Warsaw.

He made his debut for Legia on 15 November 2007, in an Ekstraklasa Cup match against Dyskobolia Grodzisk Wielkopolski. Legia's coach Jan Urban, decided that the player would join the first team. Rybus debuted in the Ekstraklasa on 24 November 2007. He played the 2007–08 season mainly as a substitute but earned a place in the starting eleven towards the end of the season. He scored his first goal in the Ekstraklasa in December 2007 against Górnik Zabrze. In April 2008, Rybus scored a brace in a league match against Wisła Kraków.

On 21 June 2016, he signed with Lyon. He played a total of 28 matches for the club.

On 19 July 2017, he signed a three-year contract with Russian side Lokomotiv Moscow, which was later renewed. Rybus left Lokomotiv on 31 May 2022 as his contract expired. Throughout his career at the club, he won one league title, two cup titles and a super cup.

On 11 June 2022, Rybus signed a two-year contract with Spartak Moscow. He scored his first goal in a 4–1 victory over Fakel Voronezh on 27 August.

On 21 June 2023, his contract with Spartak was terminated by mutual consent. On 23 June, it was announced that Rybus had signed a one-year contract with Rubin Kazan on a free transfer. He made his debut in a 1–4 loss to his former club, Spartak, on 5 August. However, he suffered an injury shortly thereafter, ruling him out from playing until the end of the year. He returned to play on 24 April 2024 in a 2–0 away victory over Russian champions Zenit St. Petersburg. He left Rubin at the end of the 2023–24 season.

In August 2024, Rybus briefly began playing in the Russian amateur competition Media Football League.

Rybus returned to Poland in January 2026 to participate in a charity football event. After spending the summer of that year training with his hometown club Pelikan Łowicz, he signed with them on 30 July, returning to a football club after two years.

== International career ==
Rybus made his debut for the Poland national team against Romania in November 2009. In the next match against Canada, he scored his first goal. He also represented Poland at UEFA Euro 2012.

In May 2018, Rybus was named in Poland's preliminary 35-man squad for the 2018 FIFA World Cup in Russia, and later made the final team.

On 2 June 2021, Rybus was named in the 26-man Poland squad for UEFA Euro 2020.

On 20 June 2022, following his transfer to Spartak Moscow, Poland barred Rybus from playing for the national team. Playing for a Russian team during the Russian invasion of Ukraine was cited as the reason.

== Personal life ==
On 17 March 2018, Rybus married Lana Baimatova, a Russian hospitality manager of Ossetian ethnicity. They divorced in November 2025.

== Career statistics ==
=== Club ===
As of match played 25 May 2024

Appearances and goals by club, season and competition
Club	Season	League			National cup (Note: Includes Polish Cup, Coupe de France, Russian Cup)		Europe		Other		Total	
Club	Season	Division	Apps	Goals	Apps	Goals	Apps	Goals	Apps	Goals	Apps	Goals
Legia Warsaw	2007–08	Ekstraklasa	10	4	4	0	—		8 (Note: Appearances in Ekstraklasa Cup)	0	22	4
Legia Warsaw	2008–09	Ekstraklasa	27	3	2	0	3 (Note: Appearances in UEFA Cup/UEFA Europa League)	0	4	0	36	3
Legia Warsaw	2009–10	Ekstraklasa	29	2	3	1	4	0	—		36	3
Legia Warsaw	2010–11	Ekstraklasa	20	2	4	0	—		—		24	2
Legia Warsaw	2011–12	Ekstraklasa	16	2	1	1	11	1	—		28	4
Legia Warsaw	Total		102	13	14	2	18	1	12	0	146	16
Terek Grozny	2011–12	Russian Premier League	11	3	1	0	—		—		12	3
Terek Grozny	2012–13	Russian Premier League	19	4	1	0	—		—		20	4
Terek Grozny	2013–14	Russian Premier League	16	0	2	0	—		—		18	0
Terek Grozny	2014–15	Russian Premier League	27	3	1	0	—		—		28	3
Terek Grozny	2015–16	Russian Premier League	28	9	3	0	—		—		31	9
Terek Grozny	Total		101	19	8	0	—		—		109	19
Lyon B	2016–17	CFA	2	0	—		—		—		2	0
Lyon	2016–17	Ligue 1	19	0	1	0	7 (Note: Four appearances in UEFA Champions League, three appearances in UEFA Europa League)	0	1 (Note: Appearance in Coupe de la Ligue)	0	28	0
Lokomotiv Moscow	2017–18	Russian Premier League	20	0	1	0	6	1	—		27	1
Lokomotiv Moscow	2018–19	Russian Premier League	16	1	1	0	2 (Note: Appearances in UEFA Champions League)	0	1 (Note: Appearance in Russian Super Cup)	0	20	1
Lokomotiv Moscow	2019–20	Russian Premier League	19	0	1	0	5	0	1	0	26	0
Lokomotiv Moscow	2020–21	Russian Premier League	26	1	4	0	6	0	1	0	37	1
Lokomotiv Moscow	2021–22	Russian Premier League	21	0	0	0	4	0	1	0	26	0
Lokomotiv Moscow	Total		102	2	7	0	23	1	4	0	136	3
Spartak Moscow	2022–23	Russian Premier League	8	1	3	0	—		1	0	12	1
Rubin Kazan	2023–24	Russian Premier League	7	1	1	0	—		—		8	1
Pelikan Łowicz	2026–27	III liga, group I	0	0	—		—		—		0	0
Career total			341	36	34	2	48	2	18	0	441	40

=== International ===
Appearances and goals by national team and year
National team	Year	Apps	Goals
Poland	2009	2	1
Poland	2010	10	0
Poland	2011	6	0
Poland	2012	5	0
Poland	2013	3	1
Poland	2014	6	0
Poland	2015	8	0
Poland	2016	4	0
Poland	2017	4	0
Poland	2018	5	0
Poland	2019	2	0
Poland	2020	3	0
Poland	2021	8	0
Total		66	2

Scores and results list Poland's goal tally first, score column indicates score after each Rybus goal.

List of international goals scored by Maciej Rybus
No.	Date	Venue	Opponent	Score	Result	Competition
1	18 November 2009	Stadion Miejski im. Zdzisława Krzyszkowiaka, Bydgoszcz, Poland	Canada	1–0	1–0	Friendly
2	4 June 2013	Stadion Cracovii im. Józefa Piłsudskiego, Kraków, Poland	Liechtenstein	2–0	2–0	Friendly

== Honours ==
Legia Warsaw

- Polish Cup: 2007–08, 2010–11, 2011–12
- Polish Super Cup: 2008

Lokomotiv Moscow

- Russian Premier League: 2017–18
- Russian Cup: 2018–19, 2020–21
- Russian Super Cup: 2019
