= Wojciech Skaba =

Polish footballer

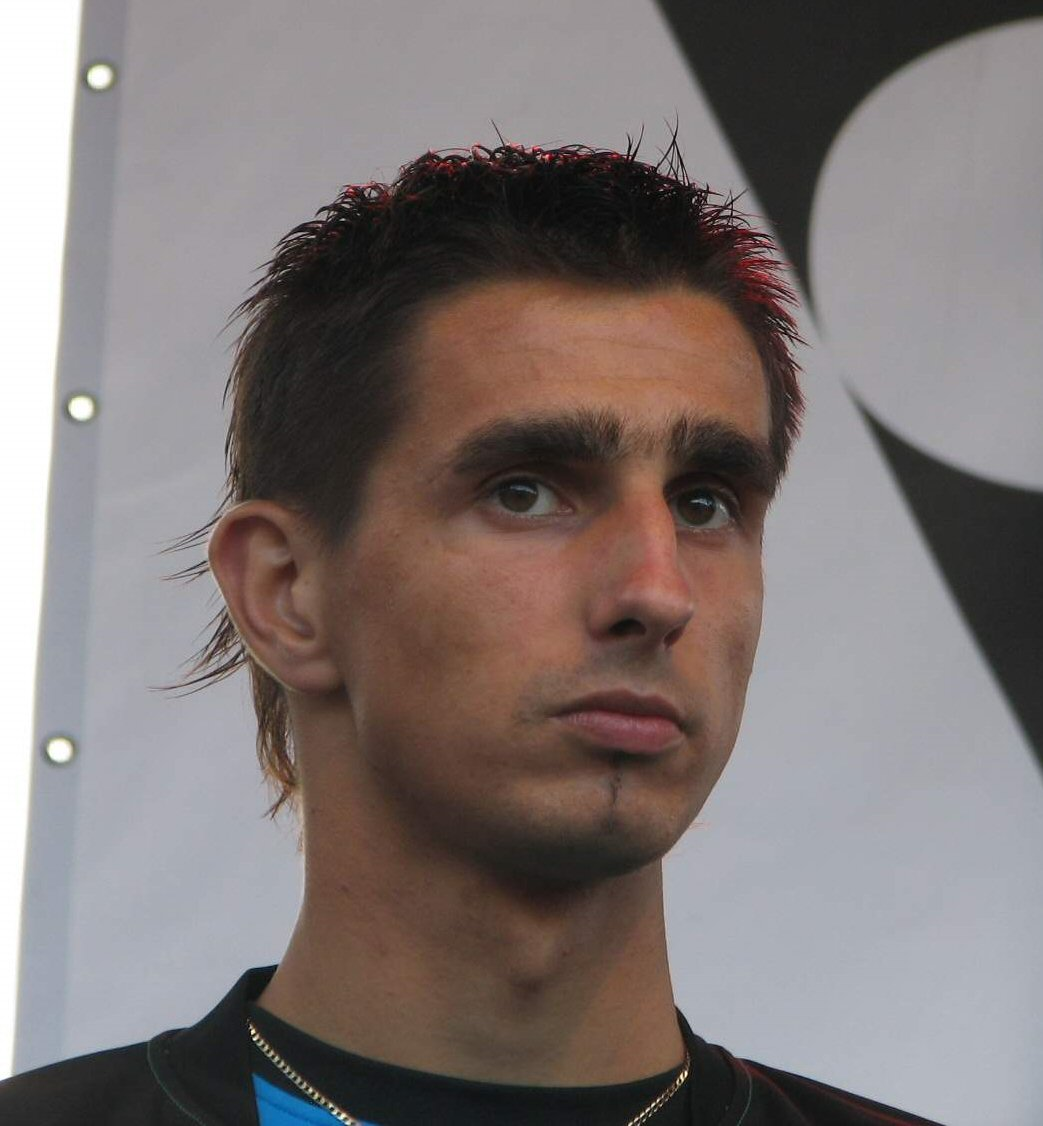

Personal information
- Full name: Wojciech Skaba
- Date of birth: 9 April 1984 (age 42)
- Place of birth: Rybnik, Poland
- Height: 1.90 m (6 ft 3 in)
- Position: Goalkeeper

Youth career
- Naprzód Rydułtowy
- 2001–2004: Rymer Niedobczyce/Rybnik

Senior career*
Years	Team	Apps	(Gls)
2004–2007	Odra Wodzisław	17	(0)
2007–2014	Legia Warsaw	29	(0)
2009–2010	→ Polonia Bytom (loan)	28	(0)
2014	Legia Warsaw II	14	(0)
2014–2017	Ruch Chorzów	7	(0)
2017	Zagłębie Sosnowiec	2	(0)
- * Club domestic league appearances and goals

Wojciech Skaba (Polish pronunciation: [ˈvɔjt͡ɕɛx ˈskaba]; born 9 April 1984) is a Polish former professional footballer who played as a goalkeeper, and a former youth gymnastics champion.

== Career ==
After a successful 2006–07 season at Odra, he signed a contract with Legia Warsaw after Łukasz Fabiański was sold to Arsenal. He spent two seasons as the club's second-choice keeper, making only two league appearances. In July 2009, he joined Polonia Bytom on a one-year loan. He returned to Legia in the summer of 2010.

In 2014, he moved to Ruch Chorzów and played seven games in Ekstraklasa.

On 27 March 2017, he signed a contract with Zagłębie Sosnowiec.

== Honours ==
Legia Warsaw

- Ekstraklasa: 2013–14
- Polish Cup: 2007–08, 2010–11, 2011–12, 2012–13
