= Takesure Chinyama =

Zimbabwean footballer (born 1982)

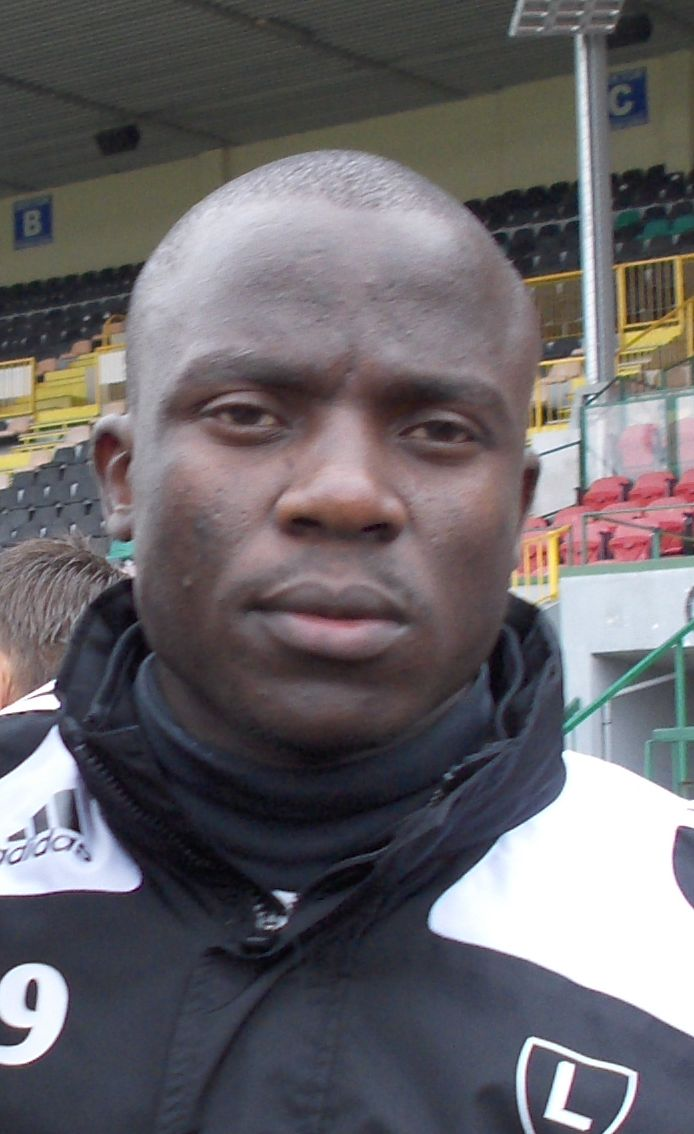

Personal information
- Date of birth: 30 September 1982 (age 44)
- Place of birth: Harare, Zimbabwe
- Height: 1.84 m (6 ft 0 in)
- Position: Forward

Team information
- Current team: Dynamos (assistant)

Senior career*
Years	Team	Apps	(Gls)
2003–2005	Wankie/Hwange		
2005–2006	Monomotapa United	8	(3)
2007	Groclin Grodzisk	11	(3)
2007–2011	Legia Warsaw	72	(36)
2012	Dynamos		
2012–2013	Orlando Pirates	15	(3)
2013–2014	Platinum Stars	5	(0)
2015	Dynamos		
2016	LZS Piotrówka		
2017	F.C. Platinum		
2019	LZS Piotrówka	12	(8)
2022	LZS Piotrówka	8	(2)
2023–2024	Batory Wola Batorska	5	(0)
2024	UKS Warszowice	6	(3)

International career
2005–2012	Zimbabwe	7	(0)
- * Club domestic league appearances and goals as of 22 September 2024

Takesure Chinyama (born 30 September 1982) is a Zimbabwean professional footballer. He is currently the assistant coach of Zimbabwean team Dynamos.

== Club career ==
Chinyama was born in Harare.

In autumn 2006, he was on trial in Legia Warsaw, but they decided not to buy him. After it, he joined Dyskobolia Grodzisk Wielkopolski. In the summer 2007, he moved to Legia, joining his two fellow countrymen, Dickson Choto and Herbert Dick. He became the first non-European joint top scorer in the Ekstraklasa history.

After four years, due to his poor performance in the 2009–10 and 2010–11 seasons and recurring health problems, he was released from Legia in June 2011.

After a short-term spell at his country's club Dynamos Harare, Chinyama joined South African team Orlando Pirates in July 2012.

== Managerial career ==
In May 2025, Chinyama was appointed assistant coach of Zimbabwean team Dynamos.

Previously, he was one of the coaches at Polish academy KS Bibiczanka.

== Career statistics ==
As of match played 29 May 2011

Appearances and goals by club, season and competition
Club	Season	League			National cup (Note: Includes Polish Cup)		Continental		Other		Total	
Club	Season	Division	Apps	Goals	Apps	Goals	Apps	Goals	Apps	Goals	Apps	Goals
Groclin Grodzisk	2006–07	Ekstraklasa	11	3	4	1	—		2 (Note: Appearances in Ekstraklasa Cup)	2	17	6
Legia Warsaw	2007–08	Ekstraklasa	28	15	6	1	0	0	4	2	38	18
Legia Warsaw	2008–09	Ekstraklasa	26	19	2	0	3 (Note: Appearances in UEFA Cup)	0	4 (Note: Three appearances and one goal in Ekstraklasa Cup, one appearance and one goal in Polish Super Cup)	1	35	21
Legia Warsaw	2009–10	Ekstraklasa	7	2	0	0	0	0	—		7	2
Legia Warsaw	2010–11	Ekstraklasa	11	0	1	0	—		—		12	0
Legia Warsaw	Total		72	36	9	1	3	0	8	3	92	41
Career total			83	39	13	9	3	0	10	5	109	47

== Honours ==
Dyskobolia Grodzisk Wielkopolski

- Polish Cup: 2006–07
- Ekstraklasa Cup: 2006–07

Legia Warsaw

- Polish Cup: 2007–08, 2010–11
- Polish Super Cup: 2008

F.C. Platinum

- Zimbabwe Premier Soccer League: 2017

Individual

- Ekstraklasa top scorer: 2008–09 (19 goals, joint with Paweł Brożek)
