= Sebastian Szałachowski =

Polish footballer

Personal information
- Full name: Sebastian Szałachowski
- Date of birth: 21 January 1984 (age 42)
- Place of birth: Lublin, Poland
- Height: 1.74 m (5 ft 8 1/2 in)
- Position: Winger

Senior career*
Years	Team	Apps	(Gls)
- Motor Lublin
2000–2003	Górnik Łęczna	61	(4)
2003	Motor Lublin	15	(6)
2004–2005	Górnik Łęczna	35	(10)
2005–2011	Legia Warsaw	90	(16)
2011–2012	ŁKS Łódź	17	(4)
2012	Cracovia	8	(0)
2012–2015	Górnik Łęczna	76	(9)

International career
2006	Poland U20	1	(0)
2004–2006	Poland U21	14	(1)
- * Club domestic league appearances and goals

Sebastian Szałachowski (Polish pronunciation: [sɛˈbastjan ʂawaˈxɔfskʲi]; born 21 January 1984) is a Polish former professional footballer who played as a winger.

== Career ==
Szałachowski had a good start to the 2006–07 season until he suffered an injury lasting over a year. His injury lasted over a year and he was expected to return for the spring 2007–08 season. The 2008–09 campaign started off very well for Szałachowski, who found a spot in left midfield and he scored one goal in the league and two goals in the 2008–09 UEFA Cup. However, during a league game against Cracovia, he broke his leg and again missed half of the season.

On 15 June 2011 Legia announced that the club won't renew Szałachowski's contract. On 25 July 2011, he joined ŁKS Łódź on a one-year contract

== Honours ==
Legia Warsaw

- Ekstraklasa: 2005–06
- Polish Cup: 2010–11
- Polish Super Cup: 2008
