= Piotr Giza =

Polish footballer (born 1980)

Personal information
- Full name: Piotr Giza
- Date of birth: 28 February 1980 (age 46)
- Place of birth: Kraków, Poland
- Height: 1.79 m (5 ft 10 in)
- Position: Midfielder

Youth career
- Kabel Kraków
- 1996–1997: Wisła Kraków

Senior career*
| Years | Team | Apps | (Gls) |
| 1997–2000 | Kabel Kraków | | |
| 2000–2002 | Świt Krzeszowice | | |
| 2002–2007 | Cracovia | 134 | (29) |
| 2007–2010 | Legia Warsaw | 65 | (8) |
| 2011 | Cracovia | 5 | (0) |
| 2012 | Jubilat Izdebnik | | |
| 2012–2013 | Skawinka Skawina | | |

International career
| 2005–2006 | Poland | 5 | (0) |

Managerial career
- 2012: Jubilat Izdebnik (player-manager)
- 2012–2013: Skawinka Skawina (player-manager)
- 2018–2019: Cracovia (youth)
- 2019–2022: Cracovia II
- 2023–2024: Wiślanie Skawina (assistant)
- * Club domestic league appearances and goals

Piotr Giza (born 28 February 1980) is a Polish professional football manager and former player who played as footballer who played as a midfielder. He was most recently the assistant manager of III liga club Wiślanie Skawina.

== Club career ==
=== Cracovia ===
Born in Kraków, Giza moved to Cracovia during the 2002–03 season. He made his Ekstraklasa debut on 30 July 2004 against Zagłębie Lubin. After a falling out with his manager Stefan Majewski, he stopped being included in the squad, even though he was generally considered one of the best offensive midfielders of the league.

=== Legia Warsaw ===
In 2007 after five years at Cracovia, he decided to play for Legia Warsaw on a loan deal. Though sometimes criticized for his poor performances and low goal count Legia decided to make the deal permanent for the 2008–09 season.

=== Return to Cracovia ===
He re-signed with Cracovia on 13 December 2010. He was released half year later.

== International career ==
Giza has been capped five times for the Poland national team.

== Career statistics ==
=== International ===
Appearances and goals by national team and year
| National team | Year | Apps | Goals |
|---|---|---|---|
Poland
| Poland | 2005 | 2 | 0 |
| Poland | 2006 | 3 | 0 |
| Total | | 5 | 0 |

== Honours ==
Legia Warsaw

- Polish Cup: 2007–08
