= Mikel Arruabarrena =

Spanish footballer

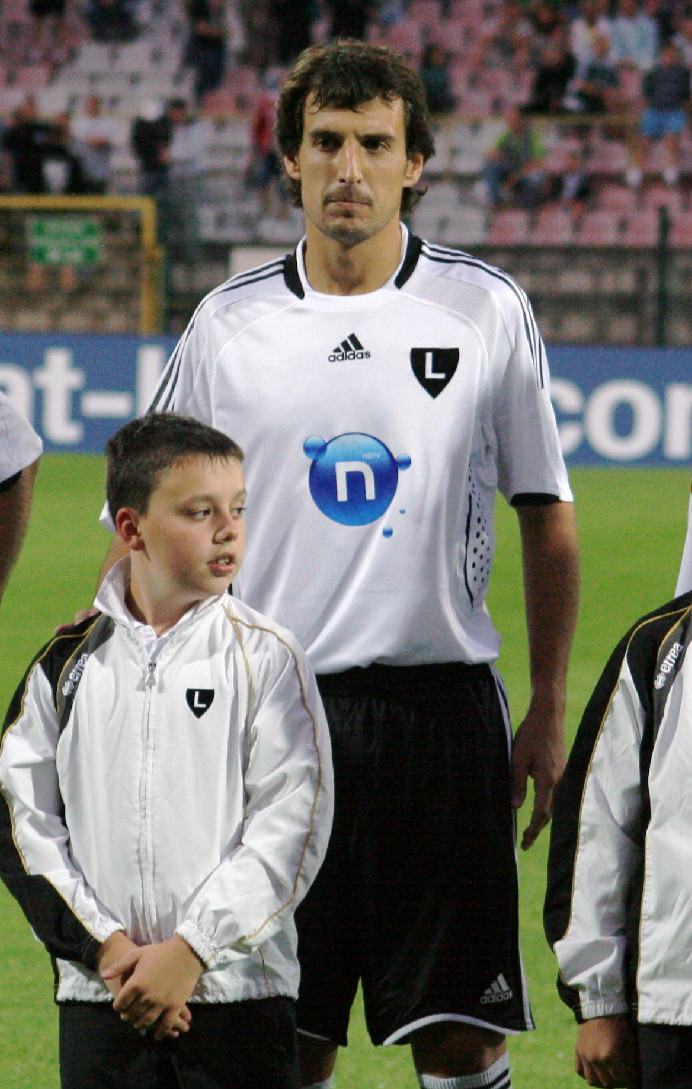
- Arruabarrena with Legia Warsaw

Personal information
- Full name: Mikel Arruabarrena Aranbide
- Date of birth: 9 February 1983 (age 43)
- Place of birth: Tolosa, Spain
- Height: 1.88 m (6 ft 2 in)
- Position: Centre-forward

Team information
- Current team: Beasain (manager)

Youth career
- Tolosa
- 1999–2002: Athletic Bilbao

Senior career*
Years	Team	Apps	(Gls)
2002–2003	Basconia	36	(5)
2003–2005	Bilbao Athletic	68	(17)
2005–2007	Osasuna B	35	(12)
2006–2007	→ Xerez (loan)	25	(5)
2007–2008	Tenerife	31	(6)
2008–2009	Legia Warsaw	6	(0)
2009	→ Eibar (loan)	13	(1)
2009–2016	Eibar	175	(44)
2010–2011	→ Leganés (loan)	34	(21)
2016	→ Huesca (loan)	16	(1)
2016–2018	AEL Limassol	48	(17)
2018	Fuenlabrada	7	(0)
2018–2019	Pontevedra	32	(8)
Total		526	(137)

International career
1999	Spain U16	1	(0)
2014	Basque Country	1	(0)

Managerial career
- 2020–2023: Tolosa
- 2023–: Beasain
- * Club domestic league appearances and goals

Mikel Arruabarrena Aranbide (born 9 February 1983) is a Spanish former professional footballer who played as a centre-forward. He is currently manager of Segunda Federación club Beasain.

== Club career ==
Born in Tolosa, Basque Country, Arruabarrena had stints with local giants Athletic Bilbao and Navarrese neighbours CA Osasuna, but did not made it past the reserves on either occasion. From 2006 to 2008, he played in the Segunda División with Xerez CD and CD Tenerife.

Arruabarrena was bought by Poland's Legia Warsaw alongside compatriots Iñaki Descarga and Iñaki Astiz in June 2008. However, in January of the following year, he was loaned to SD Eibar also in his native region and the second division, not being able to prevent the team from eventually dropping down a tier.

That summer, Arruabarrena arranged for a buyout of his Legia contract to remain at Eibar permanently, completing several seasons with the side in Segunda División B. On 12 December 2012, he was decisive in eliminating former club Athletic from the Copa del Rey, after scoring in a 1–1 draw at the San Mamés Stadium (his team progressed on the away goals rule).

Arruabarrena contributed 36 games and seven goals in the 2013–14 season, as the Armeros promoted to La Liga for the first time ever. He renewed his link with the club on 27 June 2014, and made his debut in the competition on 24 August at the age of 31, playing the full 90 minutes in a 1–0 home win against Real Sociedad.

Arruabarrena scored his first goal in the Spanish top flight on 24 September 2014, in a 1–1 home draw against Villarreal CF. On 24 January 2016, he was loaned to SD Huesca from the second division until the end of the season.

In 2016, Arruabarrena left Spain again, to join AEL Limassol of the Cypriot First Division. He returned to his country in January 2018, signing a two-year deal with third-tier CF Fuenlabrada.

== Honours ==
Eibar

- Segunda División: 2013–14
