= Legia Warsaw in European football =

Statistics for Legia Warsaw football club

- Club: Legia Warsaw
- First entry: 1956–57 European Cup
- Latest entry: 2025–26 UEFA Conference League

Legia Warsaw is an association football club from Warsaw, Poland. Legia has taken part in fifty-five UEFA cup editions: 25 times in the UEFA Cup and Europa League, 15 times in the European Cup and Champions League, 19 times in the Cup Winners' Cup and once in the Inter-Cities Fairs Cup. 5 times the club has competed in the Intertoto Cup. The club's first appearance was in the 1956–57 European Cup. The club's best performance so far is reaching the semi-finals of the European Cup, which they managed in the 1969–70 season.

== Overall record ==
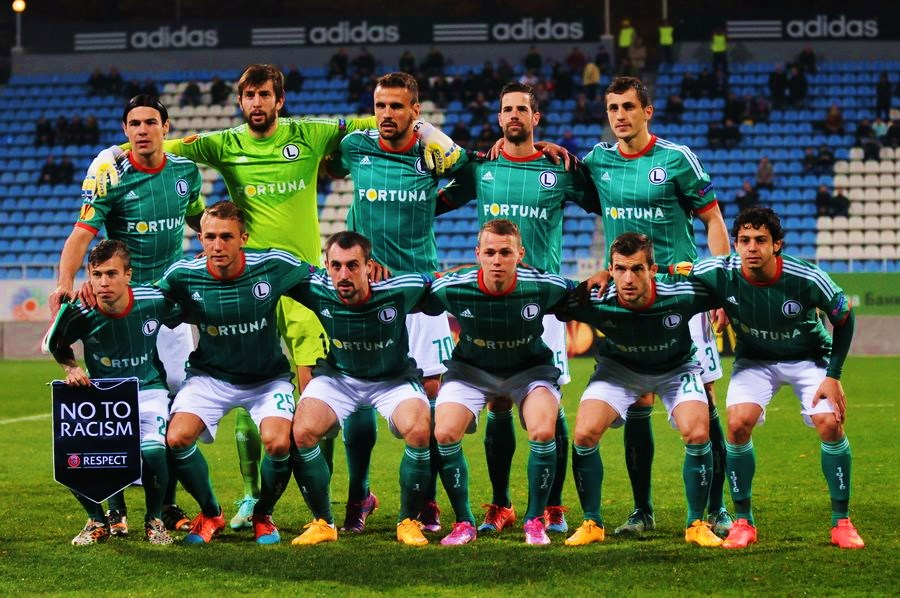
Legia Warsaw lining up before match against Metalist Kharkiv on 22 October 2014 during the 2014–15 UEFA Europa League group stage

As of match played 18 December 2025

Competition	Pld	W	D	L	GF	GA	GD
Champions League / European Cup	73	36	15	24	103	90	+13
Cup Winners' Cup	37	14	12	11	53	39	+14
Europa League / UEFA Cup	131	58	29	44	188	149	+39
Conference League	38	19	5	14	74	54	+20
UEFA competitions	279	127	61	93	418	332	+86
Inter-Cities Fairs Cup	6	3	1	2	13	6	+7
Pre-UEFA competitions	6	3	1	2	13	6	+7
Total	285	130	62	95	431	338	+93

== Results ==
Note: italics means neutral place results or penalised result

Season	Competition	Round	Nat.	Opponent	Home	Away	Aggregate
1956–57	European Cup	QR	(Czechoslovakia)	Slovan Bratislava	2–0	0–4	2–4
1960–61	European Cup	QR	(Denmark)	Aarhus	1–0	0–3	1–3
1964–65	UEFA Cup Winners' Cup	1R	(Austria)	Admira Wacker Mödling	1–0	3–1	4–1
1964–65	UEFA Cup Winners' Cup	2R	(Turkey)	Galatasaray	2–1	0–1, 1–0	3–2
1964–65	UEFA Cup Winners' Cup	QF	(Germany)	1860 München	0–4	0–0	0–4
1966–67	UEFA Cup Winners' Cup	1R	(East Germany)	Chemie Leipzig	0–3	2–2	2–5
1968–69	Inter-Cities Fairs Cup	1R	(Germany)	1860 München	6–0	3–2	9–2
1968–69	Inter-Cities Fairs Cup	2R	(Belgium)	Waregem	2–0	0–1	2–1
1968–69	Inter-Cities Fairs Cup	3R	(Hungary)	Újpest	0–1	2–2	2–3
1969–70	European Cup	1R	(Romania)	UTA Arad	8–0	2–1	10–1
1969–70	European Cup	2R	(France)	Saint-Étienne	2–1	1–0	3–1
1969–70	European Cup	QF	(Turkey)	Galatasaray	2–0	1–1	3–1
1969–70	European Cup	SF	(Netherlands)	Feyenoord	0–0	0–2	0–2
1970–71	European Cup	1R	(Sweden)	IFK Göteborg	2–1	4–0	6–1
1970–71	European Cup	2R	(Belgium)	Standard Liège	2–0	0–1	2–1
1970–71	European Cup	QF	(Spain)	Atlético Madrid	2–1	0–1	2–2 (a)
1971–72	UEFA Cup	1R	(Switzerland)	Lugano	0–0	3–1	3–1
1971–72	UEFA Cup	2R	(Romania)	Rapid București	2–0	0–4	2–4
1972–73	UEFA Cup Winners' Cup	1R	(Iceland)	Víkingur	9–0	2–0	11–0
1972–73	UEFA Cup Winners' Cup	2R	(Italy)	Milan	1–1	1–2 (a.e.t.)	2–3
1973–74	UEFA Cup Winners' Cup	1R	(Greece)	PAOK	1–1	0–1	1–2
1974–75	UEFA Cup	1R	(France)	Nantes	0–1	2–2	2–3
1980–81	UEFA Cup Winners' Cup	1R	(Bulgaria)	Slavia Sofia	1–0	1–3	2–3
1981–82	UEFA Cup Winners' Cup	1R	(Norway)	Vålerenga	4–1	2–2	6–3
1981–82	UEFA Cup Winners' Cup	2R	(Switzerland)	Lausanne-Sport	2–1	1–1	3–2
1981–82	UEFA Cup Winners' Cup	QF	(Soviet Union)	Dinamo Tbilisi	0–1	0–1	0–2
1985–86	UEFA Cup	1R	(Norway)	Viking	3–0	1–1	4–1
1985–86	UEFA Cup	2R	(Hungary)	Videoton Fehérvár	1–1	1–0	2–1
1985–86	UEFA Cup	3R	(Italy)	Internazionale	0–1 (a.e.t.)	0–0	0–1
1986–87	UEFA Cup	1R	(Soviet Union)	Dnipro	0–0	1–0	1–0
1986–87	UEFA Cup	2R	(Italy)	Internazionale	3–2	0–1	3–3 (a)
1988–89	UEFA Cup	1R	(Germany)	Bayern Munich	3–7	1–3	4–10
1989–90	UEFA Cup Winners' Cup	1R	(Spain)	Barcelona	0–1	1–1	1–2
1990–91	UEFA Cup Winners' Cup	1R	(Luxembourg)	Swift Hesperange	3–0	3–0	6–0
1990–91	UEFA Cup Winners' Cup	2R	(Scotland)	Aberdeen	1–0	0–0	1–0
1990–91	UEFA Cup Winners' Cup	QF	(Italy)	Sampdoria	1–0	2–2	3–2
1990–91	UEFA Cup Winners' Cup	SF	(England)	Manchester United	1–3	1–1	2–4
1994–95	UEFA Champions League	QR	(Croatia)	Hajduk Split	0–1	0–4	0–5
1995–96	UEFA Champions League	QR	(Sweden)	IFK Göteborg	1–0	2–1	3–1
1995–96	UEFA Champions League	GR	(Norway)	Rosenborg	3–1	0–4	2nd
1995–96	UEFA Champions League	GR	(Russia)	Spartak Moscow	0–1	1–2	2nd
1995–96	UEFA Champions League	GR	(England)	Blackburn Rovers	1–0	0–0	2nd
1995–96	UEFA Champions League	QF	(Greece)	Panathinaikos	0–0	0–3	0–3
1996–97	UEFA Cup	1QR	(Luxembourg)	Jeunesse Esch	3–0	4–2	7–2
1996–97	UEFA Cup	2QR	(Finland)	Haka	3–0	1–1	4–1
1996–97	UEFA Cup	1R	(Greece)	Panathinaikos	2–0	2–4	4–4 (a)
1996–97	UEFA Cup	2R	(Turkey)	Beşiktaş	1–1	1–2	2–3
1997–98	UEFA Cup Winners' Cup	QR	(Northern Ireland)	Glenavon	1–1	4–0	5–1
1997–98	UEFA Cup Winners' Cup	1R	(Italy)	Vicenza	0–2	1–1	1–3
1999–00	UEFA Cup	QR	(North Macedonia)	Vardar	5–0	4–0	9–0
1999–00	UEFA Cup	1R	(Cyprus)	Anorthosis Famagusta	2–0	0–1	2–1
1999–00	UEFA Cup	2R	(Italy)	Udinese	1–1	0–1	1–2
2001–02	UEFA Cup	QR	(Luxembourg)	Etzella Ettelbruck	2–1	4–0	6–1
2001–02	UEFA Cup	1R	(Sweden)	Elfsborg	4–1	6–1	10–2
2001–02	UEFA Cup	2R	(Spain)	Valencia	1–1	1–6	2–7
2002–03	UEFA Champions League	2QR	(North Macedonia)	Vardar	1–1	3–1	4–2
2002–03	UEFA Champions League	3QR	(Spain)	Barcelona	0–1	0–3	0–4
2002–03	UEFA Cup	1R	(Netherlands)	Utrecht	4–1	3–1	7–2
2002–03	UEFA Cup	2R	(Germany)	Schalke 04	2–3	0–0	2–3
2004–05	UEFA Cup	2QR	(Georgia (country))	Tbilisi	6–0	1–0	7–0
2004–05	UEFA Cup	1R	(Austria)	Austria Wien	1–3	0–1	1–4
2005–06	UEFA Cup	2QR	(Switzerland)	Zürich	0–1	1–4	1–5
2006–07	UEFA Champions League	2QR	(Iceland)	Hafnarfjörður	2–0	1–0	3–0
2006–07	UEFA Champions League	3QR	(Ukraine)	Shakhtar Donetsk	2–3	0–1	2–4
2006–07	UEFA Cup	1R	(Austria)	Austria Wien	1–1	0–1	1–2
2007-08	UEFA Intertoto Cup	2R	(Lithuania)	Vėtra	—	0–2 (0–3 w/o)	0–3
2008-09	UEFA Cup	1QR	(Belarus)	Gomel	0–0	4–1	4–1
2008-09	UEFA Cup	2QR	(Russia)	FC Moscow	1–2	0–2	1–4
2009–10	UEFA Europa League	2QR	(Georgia (country))	Olimpi Rustavi	3–0	1–0	4–0
2009–10	UEFA Europa League	3QR	(Denmark)	Brøndby	2–2	1–1	3–3 (a)
2011–12	UEFA Europa League	3QR	(Turkey)	Gaziantepspor	0–0	1–0	1–0
2011–12	UEFA Europa League	PO	(Russia)	Spartak Moscow	2–2	3–2	5–4
2011–12	UEFA Europa League	GR	(Netherlands)	PSV Eindhoven	0–3	0–1	2nd
2011–12	UEFA Europa League	GR	(Israel)	Hapoel Tel Aviv	3–2	0–2	2nd
2011–12	UEFA Europa League	GR	(Romania)	Rapid București	3–1	1–0	2nd
2011–12	UEFA Europa League	R32	(Portugal)	Sporting	2–2	0–1	2–3
2012–13	UEFA Europa League	2QR	(Latvia)	Liepājas Metalurgs	5–1	2–2	7–3
2012–13	UEFA Europa League	3QR	(Austria)	Ried	3–1	1–2	4–3
2012–13	UEFA Europa League	PO	(Norway)	Rosenborg	1–1	1–2	2–3
2013–14	UEFA Champions League	2QR	(Wales)	The New Saints	1–0	3–1	4–1
2013–14	UEFA Champions League	3QR	(Norway)	Molde	0–0	1–1	1–1 (a)
2013–14	UEFA Champions League	PO	(Romania)	Steaua București	2–2	1–1	3–3 (a)
2013–14	UEFA Europa League	GR	(Italy)	Lazio	0–2	0–1	4th
2013–14	UEFA Europa League	GR	(Turkey)	Trabzonspor	0–2	0–2	4th
2013–14	UEFA Europa League	GR	(Cyprus)	Apollon Limassol	0–1	2–0	4th
2014-15	UEFA Champions League	2QR	(Republic of Ireland)	St Patrick's Athletic	1–1	5–0	6–1
2014-15	UEFA Champions League	3QR	(Scotland)	Celtic	4–1	2–0 (0–3 w/o)	4–4 (a)
2014-15	UEFA Europa League	PO	(Kazakhstan)	Aktobe	2–0	1–0	3–0
2014-15	UEFA Europa League	GR	(Ukraine)	Metalist Kharkiv	2–1	1–0	1st
2014-15	UEFA Europa League	GR	(Turkey)	Trabzonspor	2–0	1–0	1st
2014-15	UEFA Europa League	GR	(Belgium)	Lokeren	1–0	0–1	1st
2014-15	UEFA Europa League	R32	(Netherlands)	Ajax	0–3	0–1	0–4
2015–16	UEFA Europa League	2QR	(Romania)	Botoșani	1–0	3–0	4–0
2015–16	UEFA Europa League	3QR	(Albania)	Kukësi	1–0	2–1 (3–0 w/o)	4–0
2015–16	UEFA Europa League	PO	(Ukraine)	Zorya Luhansk	3–2	1–0	4–2
2015–16	UEFA Europa League	GR	(Italy)	Napoli	0–2	2–5	4th
2015–16	UEFA Europa League	GR	(Belgium)	Club Brugge	1–1	0–1	4th
2015–16	UEFA Europa League	GR	(Denmark)	Midtjylland	1–0	0–1	4th
2016–17	UEFA Champions League	2QR	(Bosnia and Herzegovina)	Zrinjski Mostar	2–0	1–1	3–1
2016–17	UEFA Champions League	3QR	(Slovakia)	Trenčín	0–0	1–0	1–0
2016–17	UEFA Champions League	PO	(Republic of Ireland)	Dundalk	1–1	2–0	3–1
2016–17	UEFA Champions League	GR	(Spain)	Real Madrid	3–3	1–5	3rd
2016–17	UEFA Champions League	GR	(Germany)	Borussia Dortmund	0–6	4–8	3rd
2016–17	UEFA Champions League	GR	(Portugal)	Sporting	1–0	0–2	3rd
2016–17	UEFA Europa League	R32	(Netherlands)	Ajax	0–0	0–1	0–1
2017–18	UEFA Champions League	2QR	(Finland)	Mariehamn	6–0	3–0	9–0
2017–18	UEFA Champions League	3QR	(Kazakhstan)	Astana	1–0	1–3	2–3
2017–18	UEFA Europa League	PO	(Moldova)	Sheriff Tiraspol	1–1	0–0	1–1 (a)
2018–19	UEFA Champions League	1QR	(Republic of Ireland)	Cork City	1–0	3–0	4–0
2018–19	UEFA Champions League	2QR	(Slovakia)	Spartak Trnava	0–2	1–0	1–2
2018–19	UEFA Europa League	3QR	(Luxembourg)	Dudelange	1–2	2–2	3–4
2019–20	UEFA Europa League	1QR	(Gibraltar)	Europa	3–0	0–0	3–0
2019–20	UEFA Europa League	2QR	(Finland)	KuPS	1–0	0–0	1–0
2019–20	UEFA Europa League	3QR	(Greece)	Atromitos	0–0	2–0	2–0
2019–20	UEFA Europa League	PO	(Scotland)	Rangers	0–0	0–1	0–1
2020–21	UEFA Champions League	1QR	(Northern Ireland)	Linfield	1–0	—	1–0
2020–21	UEFA Champions League	2QR	(Cyprus)	Omonia	0–2 (a.e.t.)	—	0–2
2020–21	UEFA Europa League	3QR	(Kosovo)	Drita	2–0	—	2–0
2020–21	UEFA Europa League	PO	(Azerbaijan)	Qarabağ	0–3	—	0–3
2021–22	UEFA Champions League	1QR	(Norway)	Bodø/Glimt	2–0	3–2	5–2
2021–22	UEFA Champions League	2QR	(Estonia)	Flora	2–1	1–0	3–1
2021–22	UEFA Champions League	3QR	(Croatia)	Dinamo Zagreb	0−1	1−1	1–2
2021–22	UEFA Europa League	PO	(Czech Republic)	Slavia Prague	2−1	2−2	4–3
2021–22	UEFA Europa League	GR	(Italy)	Napoli	1–4	0–3	4th
2021–22	UEFA Europa League	GR	(England)	Leicester City	1–0	1–3	4th
2021–22	UEFA Europa League	GR	(Russia)	Spartak Moscow	0–1	1–0	4th
2023–24	UEFA Europa Conference League	2QR	(Kazakhstan)	Ordabasy	3–2	2–2	5–4
2023–24	UEFA Europa Conference League	3QR	(Austria)	Austria Wien	1–2	5–3	6–5
2023–24	UEFA Europa Conference League	PO	(Denmark)	Midtjylland	1–1 (a.e.t.)	3–3	4–4 (6–5 p)
2023–24	UEFA Europa Conference League	GR	(Netherlands)	AZ	2–0	0–1	2nd
2023–24	UEFA Europa Conference League	GR	(England)	Aston Villa	3–2	1–2	2nd
2023–24	UEFA Europa Conference League	GR	(Bosnia and Herzegovina)	Zrinjski Mostar	2–0	2–1	2nd
2023–24	UEFA Europa Conference League	KPO	(Norway)	Molde	0–3	2–3	2–6
2024–25	UEFA Conference League	2QR	(Wales)	Caernarfon Town	6–0	5−0	11–0
2024–25	UEFA Conference League	3QR	(Denmark)	Brøndby	1–1	3–2	4–3
2024–25	UEFA Conference League	PO	(Kosovo)	Drita	2–0	1–0	3–0
2024–25	UEFA Conference League	LP	(Spain)	Real Betis	1–0	—	7th
2024–25	UEFA Conference League	LP	(Serbia)	TSC	—	3–0	7th
2024–25	UEFA Conference League	LP	(Belarus)	Dinamo Minsk	4–0	—	7th
2024–25	UEFA Conference League	LP	(Cyprus)	Omonia	—	3–0	7th
2024–25	UEFA Conference League	LP	(Switzerland)	Lugano	1–2	—	7th
2024–25	UEFA Conference League	LP	(Sweden)	Djurgården IF	—	1–3	7th
2024–25	UEFA Conference League	R16	(Norway)	Molde	2–0 (a.e.t.)	2–3	4–3
2024–25	UEFA Conference League	QF	(England)	Chelsea	0–3	2–1	2–4
2025–26	UEFA Europa League	1QR	(Kazakhstan)	Aktobe	1−0	1−0	2–0
2025–26	UEFA Europa League	2QR	(Czech Republic)	Baník Ostrava	2–1	2–2	4–3
2025–26	UEFA Europa League	3QR	(Cyprus)	AEK Larnaca	2–1	1–4	3–5
2025–26	UEFA Conference League	PO	(Scotland)	Hibernian	3–3 (a.e.t.)	2–1	5–4
2025–26	UEFA Conference League	LP	(Turkey)	Samsunspor	0–1	—	28th
2025–26	UEFA Conference League	LP	(Ukraine)	Shakhtar Donetsk	—	2–1	28th
2025–26	UEFA Conference League	LP	(Slovenia)	Celje	—	1–2	28th
2025–26	UEFA Conference League	LP	(Czech Republic)	Sparta Prague	0–1	—	28th
2025–26	UEFA Conference League	LP	(Armenia)	Noah	—	1–2	28th
2025–26	UEFA Conference League	LP	(Gibraltar)	Lincoln Red Imps	4–1	—	28th

== Bibliography ==
- Hałys, Józef (1975). Polska piłka nożna [Polish football] (in Polish).
