= Martins Ekwueme =

Nigerian footballer (born 1985)

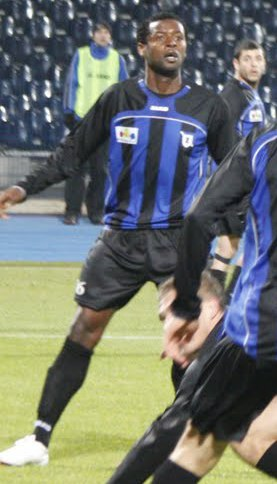
- Ekwueme with Zawisza Bydgoszcz in 2011

Personal information
- Full name: Martins Nnabugwu Ekwueme
- Date of birth: 2 October 1985 (age 41)
- Place of birth: Aboh Mbaise, Nigeria
- Height: 1.82 m (6 ft 0 in)
- Position: Midfielder

Team information
- Current team: KS Kłopotów-Osiek
- Number: 14

Senior career*
Years	Team	Apps	(Gls)
2000	Agunze Okigwe		
2000–2001	Jeziorak Iława		
2001–2002	Polonia Warsaw	2	(0)
2002–2003	Sigma Olomouc	8	(0)
2003–2006	Wisła Kraków	13	(0)
2006–2007	Polonia Warsaw	12	(0)
2007–2010	Legia Warsaw	16	(1)
2009–2010	→ Zagłębie Lubin (loan)	23	(1)
2010–2013	Zagłębie Lubin	14	(0)
2011–2012	→ Zawisza Bydgoszcz (loan)	29	(0)
2013–2014	Flota Świnoujście	8	(0)
2014	Sporting Goa	4	(0)
2015–2016	LZS Piotrówka	24	(2)
2016–2017	Kücük Kaymaklı	13	(1)
2017–2018	Falubaz Zielona Góra	39	(3)
2018–2020	Górnik Polkowice	49	(0)
2020–2022	Lechia Zielona Góra	41	(2)
2022	KS Legnickie Pole	10	(1)
2023	AKS Strzegom	9	(1)
2023	Korona Kożuchów	9	(0)
2024–2026	Odra Ścinawa	56	(2)
2026–	KS Kłopotów-Osiek	3	(0)
- * Club domestic league appearances and goals as of 23:01, 20 September 2026 (UTC)

Martins Nnabugwu Ekwueme // (born 2 October 1985) is a Nigerian footballer who plays as a midfielder for Polish club KS Kłopotów-Osiek.

== Career ==
Ekwueme first came to Poland in the 2000–01 season after joining Jeziorak Iława. Following the 2006–07 season, he joined Legia Warsaw. Then, on 31 August, he joined Zagłębie Lubin on a year loan deal. In the summer of 2010, he was traded to Zagłębie Lubin.

In July 2011, he was loaned to Zawisza Bydgoszcz on a one-year deal.

On 15 February 2014, he signed for Indian side Sporting Clube de Goa.

== Honours ==
Wisła Kraków

- Ekstraklasa: 2003–04, 2004–05

Legia Warsaw

- Polish Cup: 2007–08

LZS Piotrówka

- IV liga Opole: 2014–15

Falubaz Zielona Góra

- Polish Cup (Lubusz regionals): 2017–18

Górnik Polkowice

- III liga, group III: 2018–19

Lechia Zielona Góra

- Polish Cup (Lubusz regionals): 2020–21

Odra Ścinawa

- Regional league Legnica: 2025–26
