= Panče Ḱumbev =

Macedonian footballer (born 1979)

Panče Ќumbev
Personal information
- Full name: Panče Ќumbev; Панче Ќумбев
- Date of birth: 25 December 1979 (age 46)
- Place of birth: Titov Veles, SFR Yugoslavia
- Height: 1.88 m (6 ft 2 in)
- Position: Defender

Senior career*
Years	Team	Apps	(Gls)
1996–2000	Borec	23	(2)
2000–2003	Pobeda	106	(7)
2004–2008	Dyskobolia	52	(3)
2005	→ Obra Kościan (loan)		
2008–2010	Legia Warsaw	18	(1)
2011–2012	Rabotnički	26	(1)

International career
2003–2004	Macedonia	9	(0)
- * Club domestic league appearances and goals

Panče Ḱumbev^{[a]} (Macedonian: Панче Ќумбев; born 25 December 1979) is a Macedonian former professional footballer who played as a defender.

== International career ==
He made his senior debut for Macedonia in a February 2003 friendly match against Croatia and has earned a total of 9 caps, scoring no goals. His final international was a June 2004 friendly against Estonia.

== Honours ==
Pobeda Prilep

- Macedonian Cup: 2001–02

Dyskobolia Grodzisk Wielkopolski

- Polish Cup: 2006–07
- Ekstraklasa Cup: 2006–07, 2007–08

== Notes ==
a.	Macedonian spelling: Panče Ḱumbev, Панче Ќумбев, Romanized spelling: Panče Ćumbev.
