= 2007–08 Ekstraklasa =

82nd season of top-tier football league in Poland

Ekstraklasa
- Season: 2007–08
- Champions: Wisła Kraków; 12th Ekstraklasa title 11th Polish title
- Runner up: Legia Warsaw
- Relegated: Widzew Łódź; Zagłębie Sosnowiec; Zagłębie Lubin; Korona Kielce
- Champions League: Wisła Kraków (2nd qualifying round)
- UEFA Cup: Legia Warsaw (1st qualifying round); Lech Poznań (1st qualifying round)
- Intertoto Cup: Cracovia (1st round)
- Matches: 240
- Goals: 577 (2.4 per match)
- Top goalscorer: Paweł Brożek (23 goals)
- Highest attendance: 41,000; Ruch 3–2 Górnik (2 March 2008)
- Total attendance: 1,758,960
- Average attendance: 7,329 ▲9.3%

The 2007–08 Ekstraklasa (also known as Orange Ekstraklasa due to its sponsorship by Orange Polska) started in July 2007 and ended in mid-May 2008. It was run by the Ekstraklasa SA.

The Polish Champion will qualify for the UEFA Champions League second qualifying round. The runner-up and winner of the Polish Cup will qualify for the UEFA Cup first qualifying round. The third placed team will qualify for the second round of the UEFA Intertoto Cup. The bottom two teams will be relegated to Poland League Two for 2008-09 season, with the 3rd bottom team playing off against the 4th-placed team in Poland League Two to decide the final positions for next season (the winner will be either promoted or stay in the top league).

== Clubs ==
Location of teams in Ekstraklasa 2007–08
Location of teams in the Silesian Voivodeship

The following teams played in the Ekstraklasa:

- Cracovia
- GKS Bełchatów
- Górnik Zabrze
- Dyskobolia Grodzisk Wielkopolski (2007 Polish Cup winner)
- Korona Kielce
- Lech Poznań
- Legia Warsaw
- ŁKS Łódź
- Odra Wodzisław
- Widzew Łódź
- Wisła Kraków
- Zagłębie Lubin (2007 Polish Champion)
- Ruch Chorzów (promoted from Polish Second League)
- Jagiellonia Białystok (promoted from Polish Second League)
- Polonia Bytom (promoted from Polish Second League)
- Zagłębie Sosnowiec (promoted from Polish Second League)

== Relegated teams ==
- Zagłębie Lubin
- Korona Kielce
- Widzew Łódź
- Zagłębie Sosnowiec

== League table ==
Pos	Team	Pld	W	D	L	GF	GA	GD	Pts	Qualification or relegation
1	Wisła Kraków (C)	30	24	5	1	68	18	+50	77	Qualification to Champions League second qualifying round
2	Legia Warsaw (Note: Legia Warsaw automatically qualify for the UEFA Cup as they reached the Puchar Polski final.)	30	20	3	7	48	17	+31	63	Qualification to UEFA Cup first qualifying round
3	Dyskobolia (Note: Dyskobolia merged with Polonia Warsaw and lost own qualification for UEFA Cup)	30	18	6	6	52	24	+28	60	
4	Lech Poznań (Note: Lech Poznań took Dyskobolia place due to their resignation of playing in the UEFA Cup)	30	17	6	7	55	32	+23	57	Qualification to UEFA Cup first qualifying round
5	Zagłębie Lubin (Note: Automatically relegated at end of season due to involvement in corruption scandal.) (R)	30	15	7	8	43	30	+13	52	Relegation to I liga
6	Korona Kielce (R)	30	15	6	9	38	32	+6	51	Relegation to I liga
7	Cracovia	30	11	6	13	30	32	−2	39 (Note: CRA 3 pts, 1-0-1, 3-1; GÓR 3 pts, 1-0-1, 1-3)	Qualification to Intertoto Cup first round
8	Górnik Zabrze	30	11	6	13	34	39	−5	39	
9	GKS Bełchatów	30	9	11	10	26	32	−6	38	
10	Ruch Chorzów	30	8	10	12	35	41	−6	34	
11	ŁKS Łódź	30	7	9	14	25	31	−6	30	
12	Odra Wodzisław	30	8	5	17	28	47	−19	29	
13	Polonia Bytom	30	7	7	16	22	45	−23	28	
14	Jagiellonia Białystok	30	7	6	17	27	57	−30	27	
15	Widzew Łódź (R)	30	5	11	14	27	42	−15	26	Relegation to I liga
16	Zagłębie Sosnowiec (Note: Automatically relegated at end of season to third league due to involvement in corruption scandal and also taking one of two last standings) (R)	30	4	4	22	19	58	−39	16	Relegation to II liga

Source: 90minut.pl (in Polish)
Rules for classification: 1st points; 2nd head-to-head points; 3rd head-to-head goal difference; 4th head-to-head goals scored; 5th head-to-head away goals scored; 6th goal difference; 7th goals scored
(C) Champions; (R) Relegated

== Results ==
Home \ Away	CRA	DSK	BEŁ	GÓR	JAG	KOR	LPO	LEG	ŁKS	PBY	RUC	ODR	WID	WIS	ZLU	ZSO
Cracovia		3–1	0–2	3–0	2–0	1–1	3–2	0–2	0–0	1–1	1–0	3–0	1–0	1–2	1–2	1–0
Dyskobolia	0–0		0–0	3–1	3–1	4–0	1–0	1–0	2–0	3–1	1–4	0–0	3–0	0–0	2–0	3–0
GKS Bełchatów	0–4	1–1		0–0	2–0	2–0	0–3	2–2	1–0	0–3	2–0	3–1	3–1	0–0	0–1	2–0
Górnik Zabrze	1–0	0–0	2–0		3–0	0–3	0–1	0–3	1–1	4–0	1–0	1–0	1–1	1–3	0–1	4–2
Jagiellonia Białystok	0–2	1–3	0–1	1–1		0–0	4–2	1–2	1–0	2–1	1–1	2–3	2–1	1–2	0–0	2–1
Korona Kielce	2–0	1–1	2–2	3–2	1–0		1–0	1–0	2–0	4–0	0–2	2–0	1–1	1–1	1–4	2–0
Lech Poznań	3–1	2–1	1–1	4–1	6–1	1–0		1–0	1–2	1–0	6–2	2–0	1–0	1–2	0–0	4–2
Legia Warsaw	1–0	1–0	4–1	2–0	0–0	2–0	0–1		2–1	3–1	2–0	0–1	3–1	2–1	3–0	5–0
ŁKS Łódź	0–0	0–1	2–0	0–1	0–0	0–1	1–2	0–1		0–0	1–1	0–1	2–0	0–1	2–1	3–0
Polonia Bytom	1–0	0–2	0–0	0–4	0–1	0–2	2–2	1–2	0–1		1–1	1–0	1–1	1–2	1–0	1–0
Ruch Chorzów	2–0	1–2	1–1	3–2	4–0	1–2	0–2	0–0	0–0	2–0		3–2	1–1	0–3	2–2	1–0
Odra Wodzisław	0–1	1–2	1–0	0–2	1–3	1–0	1–2	0–2	2–2	0–2	2–0		1–1	2–2	1–3	1–0
Widzew Łódź	2–0	1–0	0–0	2–1	2–0	0–2	0–1	0–1	0–0	2–4	2–2	4–3		1–3	1–1	0–1
Wisła Kraków	2–1	3–0	2–0	2–0	5–0	4–0	4–2	1–0	5–2	5–0	2–0	0–0	1–0		2–1	4–0
Zagłębie Lubin	3–1	1–2	1–0	1–1	5–2	1–0	1–1	0–2	2–1	0–0	2–1	3–0	2–1	0–1		2–1
Zagłębie Sosnowiec	1–2	1–3	0–0	0–2	1–3	2–3	0–0	2–1	1–3	1–0	0–0	0–2	1–3	0–0	0–3	

Source: 90minut.pl (in Polish)
Legend: Blue = home team win; Yellow = draw; Red = away team win.

== Top goalscorers ==
Rank	Player	Club	Goals
1	(Poland) Paweł Brożek	Wisła Kraków	23
2	(Poland) Adrian Sikora	Dyskobolia Grodzisk	16
2	(Poland) Marek Zieńczuk	Wisła Kraków	16
4	(Zimbabwe) Takesure Chinyama	Legia Warsaw	15
5	(Peru) Hernan Rengifo	Lech Poznań	12
6	(Poland) Dawid Jarka	Górnik Zabrze	11
7	(Brazil) Edi Andradina	Korona Kielce	10
7	(Poland) Maciej Iwański	Zagłębie Lubin	10
7	(Poland) Marcin Robak	Korona Kielce	10
7	(Poland) Tomasz Zahorski	Górnik Zabrze	10
7	(Poland) Marcin Zając	Lech Poznań	10
12	(Serbia) Vuk Sotirović	Jagiellonia Białystok	8
13	(Poland) Wojciech Grzyb	Ruch Chorzów	7
13	(Italy) Stefano Napoleoni	Widzew Łódź	7

== Awards ==
=== Piłka Nożna Magazines Awards ===
Award	Recipient	Team
Coach of the year	(Poland) Maciej Skorża	Dyskobolia Grodzisk Wielkopolski/Wisła Kraków
Discovery of the year	(Poland) Radosław Majewski	Dyskobolia Grodzisk Wielkopolski
Return of the year	(Poland) Jan Urban	Legia Warszawa
Foreign player the year	(Poland) Roger Guerreiro	Legia Warszawa
President of the year	(Poland) Robert Pietryszyn	Zagłębie Lubin
League player of the year	(Poland) Marek Zieńczuk	Wisła Kraków

=== Piłka Nożna's All-Star team of fall 2007/08 ===
Position	PLayer	Team
Goalkeeper	(Slovakia) Ján Mucha	Legia Warszawa
Defender	(Poland) Marcin Baszczyński	Wisła Kraków
Defender	(Brazil) Cléber	Wisła Kraków
Defender	(Colombia) Manuel Arboleda	Zagłębie Lubin
Defender	(Poland) Dariusz Dudka	Wisła Kraków
Midfield	(Poland) Marcin Zając	Lech Poznań
Midfield	(Poland) Roger	Legia Warszawa
Midfield	(Poland) Maciej Iwański	Zagłębie Lubin
Midfield	(Poland) Marek Zieńczuk	Wisła Kraków
Forward	(Poland) Paweł Brożek	Wisła Kraków
Forward	(Zimbabwe) Takesure Chinyama	Legia Warszawa

Runners Up:

Position	PLayer	Team
Goalkeeper	(Poland) Mariusz Pawełek	Wisła Kraków
Defender	(Poland) Grzegorz Bartczak	Zagłębie Lubin
Defender	(Zimbabwe) Dickson Choto	Legia Warszawa
Defender	(Spain) Inaki Astiz	Legia Warszawa
Defender	(Poland) Tomasz Kiełbowicz	Legia Warszawa
Midfield	(Poland) Wojciech Łobodziński	Zagłębie Lubin
Midfield	(Poland) Radosław Majewski	Groclin
Midfield	(Poland) Rafał Murawski	Lech Poznań
Midfield	(Brazil) Edson	Legia Warszawa
Forward	(Brazil) Edi	Korona Kielce
Forward	(Poland) Adrian Sikora	Groclin

== Attendances ==
No.	Club	Average	Highest
1	Lech Poznań	18,010	29,000
2	Wisła Kraków	14,967	21,000
3	Górnik Zabrze	13,059	18,000
4	Ruch Chorzów	9,546	41,000
5	Korona Kielce	9,302	13,947
6	Legia Warszawa	8,333	12,000
7	Jagiellonia Białystok	7,900	12,000
8	Widzew Łódź	6,280	9,500
9	Zagłębie Lubin	5,820	12,000
10	ŁKS	4,900	10,000
11	Bełchatów	3,633	5,700
12	Polonia Bytom	3,478	9,000
13	Zagłębie Sosnowiec	3,433	8,000
14	Odra Wodzisław Śląski	3,161	5,500
15	Cracovia	2,890	4,500
16	Dyskobolia	2,546	6,040
