= Piotr Rocki =

Polish footballer (1974–2020)

Personal information
- Full name: Piotr Rocki
- Date of birth: 11 January 1974
- Place of birth: Warsaw, Poland
- Date of death: 1 June 2020 (aged 46)
- Place of death: Bytom, Poland
- Height: 1.72 m (5 ft 8 in)
- Positions: Striker; midfielder

Youth career
- 1986–1991: Polonez Warsaw
- 1991: Marcovia Marki
- 1992–1993: Polonia Warsaw

Senior career*
Years	Team	Apps	(Gls)
1993–1994	Marcovia Marki		
1993–1996	Polonia Warsaw	70	(9)
1996–1997	Hetman Zamość	0	(0)
1997–2000	Górnik Zabrze	79	(9)
2000–2001	Dyskobolia Grodzisk	3	(0)
2001–2003	Odra Wodzisław Śląski	51	(11)
2003–2004	Dyskobolia Grodzisk	28	(2)
2004–2005	Odra Wodzisław Śląski	24	(7)
2005–2008	Dyskobolia Grodzisk	75	(14)
2008–2009	Legia Warsaw	16	(0)
2000–2010	Podbeskidzie Bielsko-Biała	22	(2)
2010–2012	Ruch Radzionków	58	(6)
2012–2013	GKS Tychy	30	(9)
2013–2014	Kolejarz Stróże	16	(1)
2014	Polonia Bytom	1	(0)
2014–2018	Ruch Radzionków		

Managerial career
- 2019: Ruch Radzionków
- * Club domestic league appearances and goals

Piotr Rocki (11 January 1974 – 1 June 2020) was a Polish professional footballer.

== Club career ==
Rocki was born in Warsaw. On 5 May 2008, he joined Legia Warsaw. Before he played for Polonez Warsaw, Marcovia Marki, Polonia Warsaw, Hetman Zamość, Górnik Zabrze, Odra Wodzisław Śląski and Dyskobolia Grodzisk Wielkopolski. For Odra, he played 75 matches scoring 18 goals, becoming a fan favorite.

Right before the 2008–09 season, he joined Legia Warsaw. During his second match for Legia, Rocki scored the winning goal for his team in the Polish Super Cup against Wisła Kraków on 20 July 2008. After the 2008–09 season, he joined I liga club Podbeskidzie Bielsko-Biała. Later, he played for Polonia Bytom.

== Death ==
On 31 May 2020, Rocki was rushed to the hospital in a serious condition after a brain aneurysm ruptured. The following day, he died in the early hours of the evening. He was aged 46. After the funeral, the urn with the footballer's ashes was buried in St. Francis Parish cemetery in Zabrze.

== Honours ==
Dyskobolia Grodzisk Wielkopolski

- Polish Cup: 2006–07
- Ekstraklasa Cup: 2006–07, 2007–08

Legia Warsaw

- Polish Super Cup: 2008

Ruch Radzionków

- IV liga Silesia I: 2014–15, 2017–18
