= Przemysław Wysocki =

Polish footballer

Personal information
- Date of birth: 21 March 1989 (age 37)
- Place of birth: Nasielsk, Poland
- Height: 1.85 m (6 ft 1 in)
- Position: Left-back

Youth career
- Żbik Nasielsk
- –2005: Świt Nowy Dwór Mazowiecki

Senior career*
Years	Team	Apps	(Gls)
2005–2011	Legia Warsaw	4	(0)
2009	→ Piast Gliwice (loan)	0	(0)
2011	Legionovia Legionowo		
2012–2016	Żbik Nasielsk		
2020	Mazur Radzymin		

International career
2007	Poland U19	1	(0)
- * Club domestic league appearances and goals

Przemysław Wysocki (born 21 March 1989) is a Polish former professional footballer who played mainly as a left-back. Once considered one of the most promising full-backs in Poland, his career was hampered by numerous injuries. In 2008, Leo Beenhakker invited him for a consultation in Wronki as a potential player of the Poland national team.

== Honours ==
Legia Warsaw

- Polish Cup: 2007–08
