= Bartłomiej Grzelak =

Polish footballer (born 1981)

Personal information
- Date of birth: 9 August 1981 (age 45)
- Place of birth: Płock, Poland
- Height: 1.88 m (6 ft 2 in)
- Position: Forward

Senior career*
Years	Team	Apps	(Gls)
2000–2002	Orlen Płock	13	(2)
2002–2003	ŁKS Łódź	29	(3)
2003–2004	Unia Janikowo		
2004–2005	Kujawiak Włocławek	25	(3)
2005–2007	Widzew Łódź	45	(24)
2007–2010	Legia Warsaw	59	(13)
2010	Sibir Novosibirsk	8	(3)
2011	Jagiellonia Białystok	0	(0)
2012	Cracovia	3	(1)
2012	Górnik Zabrze	0	(0)
2013	Wisła Płock	5	(0)

International career
2006–2007	Poland	4	(2)

Managerial career
- 2024: Weszło Warsaw (interim)
- * Club domestic league appearances and goals

Bartłomiej Grzelak (born 9 August 1981) is a Polish football manager and former player who played as a forward.

== Club career ==
On 4 July 2005, he joined Widzew Łódź on a three-year contract.

In December 2006, Grzelak signed a three-and-a-half-year deal with defending Ekstraklasa champions Legia Warsaw.

On 8 August 2010, he moved abroad for the first time in his career, to join Russian club Sibir Novosibirsk on a free transfer.

He returned to Poland on 11 January the following year to sign with Jagiellonia Białystok.

On 9 July 2012, he joined Polish club Górnik Zabrze on a one-year contract, however his deal with the club was terminated just four days later, after he suffered an injury ahead of a friendly against MFK Ružomberok.

== International career ==
Grzelak made his debut for the Poland national team in a friendly against the United Arab Emirates in Abu Dhabi on 6 December 2006, scoring twice.

== Managerial career ==
On 16 April 2024, following the sacking of Piotr Kobierecki, the shareholders of IV liga Masovia club Weszło Warsaw voted in favour of Grzelak taking over as interim manager until the end of the season, alongside Marcin Burkhardt.

== Career statistics ==
=== International ===
Appearances and goals by national team and year
National team	Year	Apps	Goals
Poland
Poland	2006	2	2
Poland	2007	3	0
Total		5	2

Scores and results list Poland's goal tally first, score column indicates score after each Grzelak goal.

List of international goals scored by Bartłomiej Grzelak
No.	Date	Venue	Opponent	Score	Result	Competition
1	6 December 2006	Sheikh Zayed Stadium, Abu Dhabi, United Arab Emirates	United Arab Emirates	1–0	5–2	Friendly
2	6 December 2006	Sheikh Zayed Stadium, Abu Dhabi, United Arab Emirates	United Arab Emirates	3–1	5–2	Friendly

== Honours ==
Widzew Łódź

- II liga: 2005–06

Legia Warsaw

- Polish Cup: 2007–08

Individual

- II liga top scorer: 2005–06 (20 goals)
- Ekstraklasa Cup top scorer: 2007–08 (5 goals)
