= Marcin Smoliński =

Polish footballer

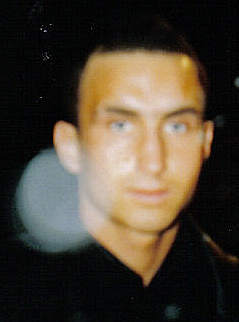
- Marcin Smolinski

Personal information
- Date of birth: 5 April 1985 (age 41)
- Place of birth: Warsaw, Poland
- Height: 1.74 m (5 ft 9 in)
- Position: Midfielder

Youth career
- 2000–2001: OSiR Targówek

Senior career*
Years	Team	Apps	(Gls)
2001–2004	GKP Targówek		
2004–2010	Legia Warsaw	62	(5)
2006	→ Odra Wodzisław (loan)	11	(0)
2009	→ ŁKS Łódź (loan)	13	(1)
2010–2012	ŁKS Łódź	37	(5)
2012–2017	Olimpia Grudziądz	149	(10)
2017–2019	Znicz Pruszków	47	(3)
2019–2020	Huragan Wołomin		

International career
2004	Poland U19		
	Poland U21	4	(1)
- * Club domestic league appearances and goals

Marcin Smoliński (born 5 April 1985) is a Polish former professional footballer who played as a midfielder.

== Career ==
=== Club ===
Smoliński started his career with GKP Targówek.

When he came to Legia, he was hailed as the new Kowalczyk, because of his personality and former place of living. However his talent did not develop to match Kowalczyk's. He spent autumn 2006 on loan with Odra Wodzisław.

In February 2009, he was loaned to ŁKS Łódź on a half year deal.

In July 2010, he joined ŁKS Łódź on a one-year contract.

Ahead of the 2019–20 season, Smoliński joined Huragan Wołomin.

=== International ===
He was a part of Poland national under-21 football team.

== Honours ==
Legia Warsaw

- Polish Cup: 2007–08

ŁKS Łódź

- I liga: 2010–11
