= Iñaki Descarga =

Spanish footballer

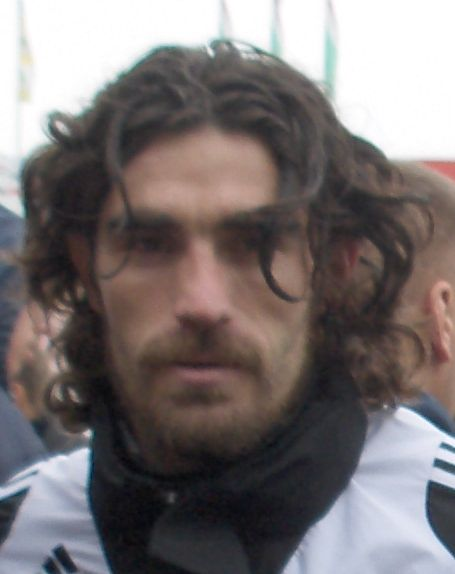
- Descarga as a Legia player

Personal information
- Full name: Iñaki Descarga Retegui
- Date of birth: 25 August 1976 (age 50)
- Place of birth: Irun, Spain
- Height: 1.74 m (5 ft 8 1/2 in)
- Position: Defender

Youth career
- Real Unión

Senior career*
Years	Team	Apps	(Gls)
1994–1996	Real Unión	14	(0)
1996–1999	Osasuna B	100	(3)
1997–1999	Osasuna	9	(0)
1999–2000	Eibar	37	(0)
2000–2008	Levante	216	(10)
2008–2009	Legia Warsaw	3	(0)
2009–2011	Real Unión	59	(2)
Total		438	(15)

Managerial career
- 2014–2015: Castellón B
- 2018–2020: Cantolagua
- 2023–2024: Burladés
- * Club domestic league appearances and goals

Iñaki Descarga Retegui (born 25 August 1976) is a Spanish former professional footballer. Mainly a central defender, he could also operate as a right-back.

He started and ended his 17-year career with Real Unión, but played mainly for Levante (eight seasons and 226 official matches, 61 in La Liga).

== Club career ==
Descarga was born in Irun, Basque Country. After an insignificant stint with CA Osasuna in the Segunda División and a season with neighbours SD Eibar in the same level, he spent eight years with Levante UD, where he would be one of their most influential players as well as captain, helping to two promotions to La Liga. His first match in the competition came on 13 November 2004 in a 1–0 away loss against Deportivo de La Coruña, with the Valencian Community side being relegated on the last matchday.

Descarga scored his goal in the top tier on 8 April 2007, in the 1–1 home draw to Real Betis. His second and last came on 20 May that year, a consolation in a 1–4 defeat against Osasuna also at the Estadi Ciutat de València.

Following Levante's severe financial crisis during 2007–08, Descarga was one of many players who would leave, joining Legia Warsaw in August 2008 and reuniting with former Osasuna teammate Iñaki Astiz. He made his Ekstraklasa debut in a 2–2 draw with Arka Gdynia, leaving the pitch after just 13 minutes after tearing his hamstring; he left at the end of the campaign, with ten total appearances.

In July 2009, Descarga signed with his first club Real Unión, recently promoted to the second tier. On 20 June 2010, as they were immediately relegated, he helped seal their fate by scoring in his own net in a 0–2 home loss to neighbours Real Sociedad (last matchday).

After not being able to help Unión return to division two, Descarga retired in June 2011 at the age of 35.

=== Match-fixing controversy ===
On 3 December 2008, Spanish regional TV channel Popular TV del Mediterráneo released a recording of a telephone conversation between Levante's president, Julio Romero, and club defender Descarga, in which the latter admitted that a certain number of his teammates had accepted a bribe to lose a 17 June 2007 match against Athletic Bilbao. The opposition won 2–0, and RC Celta de Vigo were instead relegated.

== Honours ==
Levante

- Segunda División: 2003–04
