= Grzegorz Bartczak =

Polish footballer (born 1985)

Personal information
- Full name: Grzegorz Bartczak
- Date of birth: 21 June 1985 (age 41)
- Place of birth: Legnica, Poland
- Height: 1.82 m (6 ft 0 in)
- Position: Right-back

Team information
- Current team: Prochowiczanka Prochowice (player-manager)
- Number: 85

Youth career
- Konfeks Legnica

Senior career*
Years	Team	Apps	(Gls)
2002–2011	Zagłębie Lubin	132	(4)
2011–2012	Jagiellonia Białystok	11	(0)
2012–2013	Warta Poznań	28	(3)
2013–2020	Miedź Legnica	163	(12)
2015–2022	Miedź Legnica II	58	(7)
2023	GKS Raciborowice	13	(3)
2023–	Prochowiczanka Prochowice	34	(1)

International career
2002	Poland U17		
2004	Poland U19		
2007	Poland	2	(0)

Managerial career
- 2024–: Prochowiczanka Prochowice (player-manager)
- * Club domestic league appearances and goals as of 21:54, 30 June 2026 (UTC)

Grzegorz Bartczak (born 21 June 1985) is a Polish professional footballer who plays as a right-back for IV liga Lower Silesia club Prochowiczanka Prochowice, where he also serves as a co-manager.

== Club career ==
Previously, he played for Zagłębie Lubin.

In June 2011, he joined Jagiellonia Białystok on a three-year contract but terminated his Jagiellonia contract by mutual consent in February 2012. He later joined Warta Poznań.

== International career ==
He was called up to the Poland national football team by Leo Beenhakker for games against Azerbaijan and Armenia which took place on 24 and 28 March 2007.

== Managerial statistics ==
As of match played 6 June 2026

Managerial record by team and tenure
Team	From	To	Record							
Team	From	To	G	W	D	L	GF	GA	GD	Win %
Prochowiczanka Prochowice (player-manager)	9 July 2024	Present	73	29	13	31	123	145	−22	39.73
Total			73	29	13	31	123	145	−22	39.73

== Honours ==
Zagłębie Lubin

- Ekstraklasa: 2006–07
- Polish Super Cup: 2007

Miedź Legnica

- I liga: 2017–18
