= Wojciech Szala =

Polish footballer

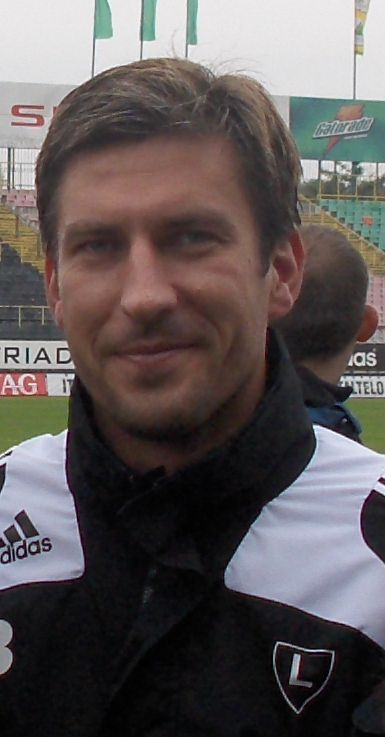

Personal information
- Full name: Wojciech Szala
- Date of birth: 27 January 1976 (age 50)
- Place of birth: Piotrków Trybunalski, Poland
- Height: 1.83 m (6 ft 0 in)
- Position: Defender

Youth career
- 1987–1994: GKS Katowice

Senior career*
Years	Team	Apps	(Gls)
1994–2001	GKS Katowice	93	(1)
2001–2010	Legia Warsaw	165	(0)
2010–2011	GKS Katowice	17	(0)
Total		275	(1)
- * Club domestic league appearances and goals

Wojciech Szala (born 27 January 1976) is a Polish former professional footballer who played as a defender.

== Career ==
=== GKS Katowice ===
Szala played in GKS Katowice between 1994 and 2001 for which he played in 93 matches and scored one goal. With GKS Katowice, he won the Polish Super Cup in 1995.

=== Legia Warsaw ===
In the summer of 2001, he was recruited for Legia Warsaw by Dragan Okuka. He made his debut in a 4–0 away win over Ruch Chorzów, playing the entire 90 minutes. In that season, he won the league with Legia, as well as the League Cup.

While Okuka was Legia's coach, Szala played as right midfielder from time to time. The next manager, Dariusz Kubicki, used Szala exclusively as a right defender.

The following temporary coach, Jacek Zieliński moved Szala to the center of defense. When Legia was taken over by Dariusz Wdowczyk, Szala returned to the right defense.

He was the first squad Legia player in the 2003–04, 2004–05 and 2005–06 seasons and has contributed to Legia being the least goal-conceding side in the league during that time.

=== Return to GKS Katowice ===
In September 2010, he rejoined GKS Katowice. He was released one year later.

== Honours ==
GKS Katowice

- Polish Super Cup: 1995

Legia Warsaw

- Ekstraklasa: 2001–02, 2005–06
- Polish Cup: 2007–08
- Polish League Cup: 2001–02
- Polish Super Cup: 2008
