= Kamil Majkowski =

Polish footballer

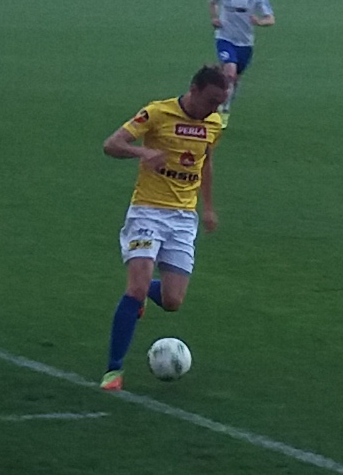
- Majkowski with Motor Lublin in 2017

Personal information
- Full name: Kamil Majkowski
- Date of birth: 4 February 1989 (age 37)
- Place of birth: Maków Mazowiecki, Poland
- Height: 1.78 m (5 ft 10 in)
- Positions: Forward; left winger

Team information
- Current team: Makowianka Maków Mazowiecki (manager)

Youth career
- 2004: Makowianka Maków Mazowiecki
- 2005: AON Rembertów

Senior career*
| Years | Team | Apps | (Gls) |
| 2005–2006 | AON Rembertów | | |
| 2006 | Legia Warsaw II | | |
| 2007–2012 | Legia Warsaw | 8 | (0) |
| 2008 | → Wisła Płock (loan) | 19 | (5) |
| 2009–2010 | → Znicz Pruszków (loan) | 2 | (1) |
| 2011 | → Pogoń Szczecin (loan) | 8 | (0) |
| 2011–2012 | → Zawisza Bydgoszcz (loan) | 7 | (0) |
| 2012 | Sandecja Nowy Sącz | 14 | (2) |
| 2013 | Makowianka Maków Mazowiecki | | |
| 2014–2016 | Błękitni Raciąż | | |
| 2017–2018 | Motor Lublin | 49 | (6) |
| 2018–2020 | Makowianka Maków Mazowiecki | 43 | (49) |
| 2020–2023 | CK Troszyn | 81 | (51) |
| 2023–2024 | Makowianka Maków Mazowiecki | 12 | (0) |

International career
| 2008 | Poland U19 | | |

Managerial career
- 2013: Makowianka Maków Mazowiecki (player-manager)
- 2023–: Makowianka Maków Mazowiecki
- * Club domestic league appearances and goals

Kamil Majkowski (born 4 February 1989) is a Polish professional football manager and former player who played as a forward. He is currently in charge of IV liga Masovia club Makowianka Maków Mazowiecki.

== Club career ==
He spent the first half of the 2008–09 season on loan at Wisła Płock. In the summer 2009, he was loaned to Znicz Pruszków on a one-year deal.

In February 2011, he was loaned to Pogoń Szczecin on a half-year deal. In July 2011, he was loaned to Zawisza Bydgoszcz.

On 19 January 2017, Majkowski signed a one-and-a-half-year contract with III liga club Motor Lublin.

== International career ==
He was a part of Poland national under-19 team.

== Managerial statistics ==
As of match played 26 April 2025

Managerial record by team and tenure
| Team | From | To | Record | | | | | | | |
| Team | From | To | G | W | D | L | GF | GA | GD | Win % |
|---|---|---|---|---|---|---|---|---|---|---|
| Makowianka Maków Mazowiecki | 13 July 2023 | Present | 58 | 30 | 8 | 20 | 119 | 91 | +28 | 51.72 |
| Total | | | 58 | 30 | 8 | 20 | 119 | 91 | +28 | 51.72 |

== Honours ==
=== Player ===
Legia Warsaw

- Polish Cup: 2007–08

Błękitni Raciąż

- IV liga Masovia (North): 2014–15

Motor Lublin

- Polish Cup (Lublin subdistrict regionals): 2016–17

Makowianka Maków Mazowiecki

- Regional league Ciechanów-Ostrołęka: 2018–19

CK Troszyn

- Polish Cup (Ciechanów-Ostrołęka regionals): 2022–23
