= Iñaki Astiz =

Spanish footballer

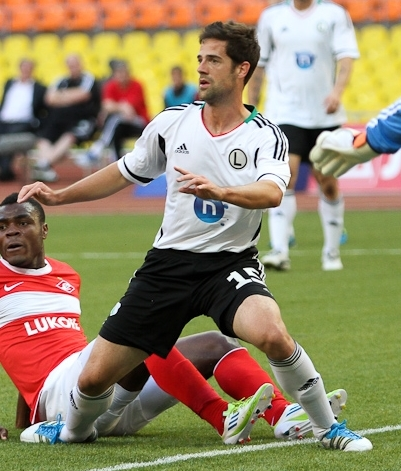
- Astiz with Legia Warsaw in 2011

Personal information
- Full name: Iñaki Astiz Ventura
- Date of birth: 5 November 1983 (age 42)
- Place of birth: Pamplona, Spain
- Height: 1.85 m (6 ft 1 in)
- Position: Centre-back

Team information
- Current team: AEK Larnaca (assistant)

Youth career
- Osasuna

Senior career*
Years	Team	Apps	(Gls)
2002–2007	Osasuna B	132	(9)
2007–2008	Osasuna	0	(0)
2007–2008	→ Legia Warsaw (loan)	23	(1)
2008–2015	Legia Warsaw	136	(7)
2013–2014	Legia Warsaw II	4	(0)
2015–2017	APOEL	43	(2)
2017–2021	Legia Warsaw	38	(0)
2019–2021	Legia Warsaw II	44	(0)
Total		420	(19)

Managerial career
- 2025: Legia Warsaw (caretaker)
- 2026: AEK Larnaca (caretaker)
- * Club domestic league appearances and goals

Iñaki Astiz Ventura (born 5 November 1983) is a Spanish former professional footballer who played as a central defender. He is currently the assistant manager of Cypriot First Division club AEK Larnaca.

Developed at Osasuna, he spent most of his career at Legia Warsaw, appearing in 273 competitive matches and winning several titles. He also played in the Cypriot First Division with APOEL.

== Playing career ==
A product of local CA Osasuna's youth system, Astiz was born in Pamplona, Navarre, and his earlier career was spent with their reserves where he met Jan Urban, a former club player who was their manager at the time. Thus, he was loaned for the 2007–08 season to Legia Warsaw (where Urban would work as coach) in the Ekstraklasa, becoming the first Spaniard ever to play in that competition.

Astiz returned to Osasuna in June 2008, only to rejoin Legia immediately for five years despite still having a contract running. The former, however, retained the possibility to re-buy the player after the first two seasons.

On 21 June 2015, Astiz signed a two-year deal with APOEL FC in the Cypriot First Division. He made his competitive debut on 14 July, in a 0–0 home draw against FK Vardar in the second qualifying round of the UEFA Champions League. He scored his first goal for his new team on 12 December 2016, the second in the 2–1 home win over Anorthosis Famagusta FC in the domestic league.

On 15 August 2017, the 33-year-old Astiz returned to Legia Warsaw. He scored his only goal in the Champions League on 31 July 2018, the only in a victory at FC Spartak Trnava in the second qualifying round that amounted to nothing as his side had lost 2–0 in the first leg. In June 2020, he agreed to a one-year extension at the Stadion Wojska Polskiego.

Astiz joined their reserve team in the III liga in July 2021. He retired shortly after, aged 38; over his two spells, he won four national championships and five Polish Cups.

== Coaching career ==
=== Legia Warsaw ===
On 25 October 2021, Legia II head coach Marek Gołębiewski was promoted to first-team manager, and Astiz joined his staff as an assistant. After the former's dismissal, he kept his role under Aleksandar Vuković, Kosta Runjaić, Gonçalo Feio and Edward Iordănescu.

On 31 October 2025, Astiz was appointed caretaker manager following Iordănescu's departure. Legia's form continued to drop after he took over, resulting in finishing the first half of the domestic league in the relegation zone and failing to advance to the knockout stage of the UEFA Conference League. In terms of average points, he had the worst record (0.6 points per game) among all club managers who had been in charge for more than one match. On 18 December, they recorded their only win during his tenure, 4–1 over Lincoln Red Imps in the Conference League league phase; the following day, he was replaced by Marek Papszun and resumed his duties as an assistant.

=== AEK Larnaca ===
Astiz joined Mauro Camoranesi's staff at AEK Larnaca in June 2026. On 14 August, he was appointed caretaker manager after Camoranesi had left the club. He returned to his role as assistant on 25 August following Rubén Sellés' appointment, without managing AEK Larnaca in an official game.

== Personal life ==
Astiz met Polish blogger Dominika Fetraś in 2008 when he was playing in the country, and they married on 31 December 2014. He has a daughter, Luna.

== Career statistics ==
Appearances and goals by club, season and competition
Club	Season	League			National cup (Note: Includes Polish Cup, Cypriot Cup)		Europe		Other		Total	
Club	Season	Division	Apps	Goals	Apps	Goals	Apps	Goals	Apps	Goals	Apps	Goals
Osasuna B	2002–03	Segunda División B	18	1	—		—		—		18	1
Osasuna B	2003–04	Segunda División B	15	1	—		—		—		15	1
Osasuna B	2004–05	Segunda División B	34	3	—		—		—		34	3
Osasuna B	2005–06	Segunda División B	31	2	—		—		—		31	2
Osasuna B	2006–07	Segunda División B	34	2	—		—		—		34	2
Osasuna B	Total		132	9	—		—		—		132	9
Legia Warsaw (loan)	2007–08	Ekstraklasa	23	1	6	0	1 (Note: Appearance in UEFA Intertoto Cup)	0	5 (Note: Appearances in Ekstraklasa Cup)	0	35	1
Legia Warsaw	2008–09	Ekstraklasa	26	1	4	0	0	0	6	1	36	2
Legia Warsaw	2009–10	Ekstraklasa	25	1	4	0	4 (Note: Appearances in UEFA Europa League)	0	—		33	1
Legia Warsaw	2010–11	Ekstraklasa	17	0	6	0	—		—		23	0
Legia Warsaw	2011–12	Ekstraklasa	12	1	3	0	2	0	—		17	1
Legia Warsaw	2012–13	Ekstraklasa	26	1	4	0	6	0	1 (Note: Appearance in Polish Super Cup)	0	37	1
Legia Warsaw	2013–14	Ekstraklasa	11	2	1	0	2	0	—		14	2
Legia Warsaw	2014–15	Ekstraklasa	19	1	4	0	8 (Note: Four appearances in UEFA Champions League, four appearances in UEFA Europa League)	0	—		31	1
Legia Warsaw	Total		159	8	32	0	23	0	12	1	226	9
Legia Warsaw II	2013–14	III liga	4	0	—		—		—		4	0
APOEL	2015–16	Cypriot First Division	16	0	3	0	10 (Note: Six appearances in UEFA Champions League, four appearances in UEFA Europa League)	0	1 (Note: Appearance in Cypriot Super Cup)	0	30	0
APOEL	2016–17	Cypriot First Division	27	2	3	1	14 (Note: Six appearances in UEFA Champions League, eight appearances in UEFA Europa League)	0	1	0	45	3
APOEL	Total		43	2	6	1	24	0	2	0	75	3
Legia Warsaw	2017–18	Ekstraklasa	22	0	1	0	0	0	—		23	0
Legia Warsaw	2018–19	Ekstraklasa	10	0	0	0	5 (Note: Four appearances and one goal in UEFA Champions League, one appearance in UEFA Europa League)	1	1	0	16	1
Legia Warsaw	2019–20	Ekstraklasa	6	0	1	0	—		—		7	0
Legia Warsaw	2020–21	Ekstraklasa	0	0	0	0	0	0	1	0	1	0
Legia Warsaw	Total		38	0	2	0	5	1	2	0	47	1
Legia Warsaw II	2019–20	III liga	7	0	—		—		—		7	0
Legia Warsaw II	2020–21	III liga	20	0	—		—		—		20	0
Legia Warsaw II	2021–22	III liga	17	0	—		—		—		17	0
Legia Warsaw II	Total		44	0	—		—		—		44	0
Career total			420	19	40	1	52	1	16	1	528	22

== Managerial statistics ==
As of match played 18 December 2025

Managerial record by team and tenure
Team	From	To	Record							
Team	From	To	G	W	D	L	GF	GA	GD	Win %
Legia Warsaw (caretaker)	31 October 2025	19 December 2025	10	1	3	6	11	15	−4	10.00
AEK Larnaca (caretaker)	14 August 2026	25 August 2026	0	0	0	0	0	0	—	
Total			10	1	3	6	11	15	−4	10.00

== Honours ==
Legia Warsaw

- Ekstraklasa: 2012–13, 2013–14, 2017–18, 2019–20
- Polish Cup: 2007–08, 2011–12, 2012–13, 2014–15, 2017–18

APOEL

- Cypriot First Division: 2015–16, 2016–17
