= Adrian Paluchowski =

Polish footballer (born 1987)

Personal information
- Full name: Adrian Paluchowski
- Date of birth: 19 August 1987 (age 39)
- Place of birth: Warsaw, Poland
- Height: 1.80 m (5 ft 11 in)
- Position: Forward

Team information
- Current team: Wisła Puławy

Youth career
- 1996–2004: Agrykola Warsaw

Senior career*
Years	Team	Apps	(Gls)
2004–2005	Agrykola Warsaw		
2005	Delta Warsaw		
2006	Legia Warsaw II		
2007–2010	Legia Warsaw	16	(5)
2008	→ Znicz Pruszków (loan)	33	(11)
2010	→ Piast Gliwice (loan)	11	(0)
2010–2012	Górnik Łęczna	39	(6)
2012–2014	Znicz Pruszków	62	(37)
2014–2016	Termalica	23	(4)
2015–2016	→ Zagłębie Sosnowiec (loan)	15	(1)
2016–2017	Znicz Pruszków	31	(10)
2017–2019	Pogoń Siedlce	52	(22)
2019–2020	Stal Mielec	27	(5)
2020–2023	Wisła Puławy	92	(54)
2023–2025	Avia Świdnik	58	(22)
2026–	Wisła Puławy	0	(0)

International career
	Poland U23	3	(1)
- * Club domestic league appearances and goals as of 18:43, 30 July 2026 (UTC)

Adrian Paluchowski (born 19 August 1987) is a Polish professional footballer who plays as a forward for Klasa A club Wisła Puławy. He served as the sporting director of Avia Świdnik from 2025 to 2026.

== Career ==
In March 2008, Paluchowski went on loan to Znicz Pruszków in the Polish second division. He returned to Legia in January 2009. In January 2010, he was loaned to Piast Gliwice on a one-year deal. He returned to Legia half-a-year later and was sold to Górnik Łęczna.

In 2020, Paluchowski signed for Wisła Puławy.

== Honours ==
Stal Mielec

- I liga: 2019–20

Wisła Puławy

- III liga, group IV: 2020–21
- Polish Cup (Lublin subdistrict regionals): 2020–21

Avia Świdnik

- Polish Cup (Lublin regionals): 2023–24, 2024–25
- Polish Cup (Lublin subdistrict regionals): 2023–24, 2024–25

Individual

- II liga East top scorer: 2013–14
- III liga, group IV top scorer: 2020–21
