= 2006–07 Ekstraklasa =

81st season of top-tier football league in Poland

Ekstraklasa
- Season: 2006–07
- Champions: Zagłębie Lubin (2nd title)
- Runner up: GKS Bełchatów
- Relegated: Wisła Płock; Pogoń Szczecin; Arka Gdynia; Górnik Łęczna
- Champions League: Zagłębie Lubin (2nd qualifying round)
- UEFA Cup: GKS Bełchatów (1st qualifying round); Dyskobolia (1st qualifying round)
- Intertoto Cup: Legia Warsaw (1st round)
- Matches: 240
- Goals: 621 (2.59 per match)
- Top goalscorer: Piotr Reiss (15 goals)
- Highest attendance: 26,000; Lech 3–1 Legia (19 May 2007)
- Total attendance: 1,609,680
- Average attendance: 6,707 ▲21.5%

The 2006–07 Ekstraklasa (also known as Orange Ekstraklasa due to its sponsorship by Orange Polska) started on 28 July 2006 and finished on 26 May 2007. Zagłębie Lubin were crowned champions.

For the second time league was sponsored by cell phone operator Orange Polska and official name for championship was Orange Ekstraklasa 2006–07.

== Corruption ==
On 12 April 2007 PZPN decided about degradation of Górnik Łęczna (two class degradation and 270,000 PLN fine) and Arka Gdynia (one class degradation and 200,000 PLN fine and minus 5 points on the start of next season) due to their involvement in corruption scandal.

== Clubs ==
Location of teams in Ekstraklasa 2006–07

16 clubs competed in the 2006–07 season:

- Teams that finished 1–13 in 2005–06 Ekstraklasa. In alphabetical order:
  - Cracovia
  - Dyskobolia Grodzisk Wielkopolski
  - GKS Bełchatów
  - Górnik Łęczna
  - Górnik Zabrze
  - Korona Kielce
  - Lech Poznań
  - Legia Warszawa
  - Odra Wodzisław Śląski
  - Pogoń Szczecin
  - Wisła Kraków
  - Wisła Płock
  - Zagłębie Lubin
- Three teams promoted from Polish Second League. In alphabetical order:
  - Arka Gdynia (3rd place, won playoffs)
  - ŁKS Łódź
  - Widzew Łódź

== League table ==
Pos	Team	Pld	W	D	L	GF	GA	GD	Pts	Qualification or relegation
1	Zagłębie Lubin (C)	30	18	8	4	57	29	+28	62	Qualification to Champions League second qualifying round
2	GKS Bełchatów	30	19	4	7	63	32	+31	61	Qualification to UEFA Cup first qualifying round
3	Legia Warsaw	30	16	4	10	53	33	+20	52	Qualification to Intertoto Cup second round
4	Cracovia	30	14	7	9	48	41	+7	49	
5	Dyskobolia (Note: Dyskobolia Grodzisk won Puchar Polski, therefore giving them the second UEFA Cup spot.)	30	11	15	4	40	26	+14	48	Qualification to UEFA Cup first qualifying round
6	Lech Poznań	30	12	11	7	53	36	+17	47	
7	Korona Kielce	30	14	5	11	41	34	+7	47 (Note: KOR 4 pts, 1-1-0, 5-2; WIS 1 pts, 0-1-1, 2-5)	
8	Wisła Kraków	30	10	16	4	41	25	+16	46	
9	ŁKS Łódź	30	10	11	9	31	30	+1	41	
10	Odra Wodzisław	30	10	10	10	29	36	−7	40	
11	Arka Gdynia (Note: Arka Gdynia was relegated to 2nd division due to a corruption scandal) (R)	30	10	10	10	43	39	+4	40	Relegation to II liga
12	Widzew Łódź	30	7	7	16	27	48	−21	28	
13	Górnik Łęczna (Note: Górnik Łęczna was dissolved after the season and started playing in the new fourth league.) (R)	30	7	5	18	24	64	−40	26	Relegation to III liga
14	Górnik Zabrze	30	6	7	17	30	51	−21	25	
15	Wisła Płock (R)	30	4	11	15	20	47	−27	23	Relegation to II liga
16	Pogoń Szczecin (Note: Pogoń Szczecin was relegated to 4th division) (R)	30	3	7	20	24	53	−29	16	Relegation to IV liga

Source: 90minut.pl (in Polish)
Rules for classification: 1st points; 2nd head-to-head points; 3rd head-to-head goal difference; 4th head-to-head goals scored; 5th head-to-head away goals scored; 6th goal difference; 7th goals scored
(C) Champions; (R) Relegated

== Results ==
Home \ Away	ARK	CRA	BEŁ	GKŁ	GÓR	DSK	KOR	LPO	LEG	ŁKS	ODR	POG	WID	WIS	WPK	ZLU
Arka Gdynia		4–2	1–3	5–1	3–0	2–4	0–3	3–1	1–1	0–0	0–1	2–0	3–0	0–0	4–1	3–0
Cracovia	1–1		2–1	5–0	3–1	1–1	1–0	3–0	0–0	1–1	1–0	1–0	2–1	0–0	2–2	2–4
GKS Bełchatów	2–2	2–1		6–0	3–1	1–0	3–2	0–0	3–1	1–2	5–1	1–0	1–0	1–2	2–1	3–1
Górnik Łęczna	1–0	1–0	1–3		0–2	1–3	1–3	0–3	1–2	0–1	2–0	3–2	1–5	1–1	0–0	2–1
Górnik Zabrze	2–0	1–5	0–4	2–0		2–3	0–0	1–2	1–0	1–1	2–2	0–3	0–3	0–4	2–0	0–3
Dyskobolia	2–1	0–0	1–1	1–1	2–0		1–0	1–0	1–1	2–0	1–1	3–1	0–0	2–2	1–1	0–0
Korona Kielce	1–0	1–2	5–3	2–0	4–2	2–0		2–2	3–1	1–0	0–1	2–1	3–0	0–0	0–0	1–2
Lech Poznań	1–1	3–4	1–1	1–0	2–0	2–2	3–0		3–1	4–0	0–0	3–0	6–1	3–3	3–2	0–2
Legia Warsaw	3–0	3–1	1–2	5–0	3–2	0–1	3–0	3–2		2–1	2–0	3–1	2–0	1–1	5–0	1–2
ŁKS Łódź	0–1	2–1	0–1	0–0	2–0	1–1	2–1	1–2	2–1		1–1	4–0	0–0	2–1	0–0	2–2
Odra Wodzisław	1–1	0–1	1–0	2–1	0–0	0–0	1–2	0–0	1–2	1–2		2–2	3–0	2–1	1–0	1–0
Pogoń Szczecin	0–0	0–2	0–2	3–0	0–0	1–1	1–1	1–3	0–1	0–1	1–3		0–1	1–1	1–2	1–3
Widzew Łódź	1–1	1–3	0–3	1–0	3–0	2–1	0–1	3–2	0–1	2–1	1–2	0–1		0–0	0–0	0–2
Wisła Kraków	2–2	3–0	2–4	2–1	1–0	0–4	2–0	0–0	3–1	0–0	6–0	0–0	2–0		2–0	0–0
Wisła Płock	1–0	0–2	0–4	0–1	0–1	0–0	0–1	1–1	0–3	2–1	1–1	2–1	2–2	0–0		0–2
Zagłębie Lubin	6–0	4–3	2–1	1–1	1–1	2–1	2–0	0–0	1–0	1–1	1–0	6–2	4–2	0–0	2–1	

Source: 90minut.pl (in Polish)
Legend: Blue = home team win; Yellow = draw; Red = away team win.

== Top goalscorers ==
Rank	Player	Club	Goals
1	(Poland) Piotr Reiss	Lech Poznań	15
2	(Poland) Michał Chałbiński	Zagłębie Lubin	12
2	(Poland) Adrian Sikora	Dyskobolia Grodzisk	12
4	(Poland) Łukasz Piszczek	Zagłębie Lubin	11
5	(Poland) Tomasz Moskała	Cracovia	10
5	(Poland) Piotr Włodarczyk	Legia Warsaw	10
5	(Poland) Zbigniew Zakrzewski	Lech Poznań	10
8	(Poland) Janusz Dziedzic	Arka Gdynia	9
8	(Poland) Radosław Matusiak	GKS Bełchatów	9
8	(Poland) Mariusz Ujek	GKS Bełchatów	9

== Annual awards ==
These were given out by the weekly magazine Piłka Nożna

=== Coach of the Year ===
Orest Lenczyk (GKS Bełchatów)

=== Discovery of the Year ===
Radosław Matusiak (GKS Bełchatów)

=== League player of the year ===
Piotr Reiss (Lech Poznań)

=== Best Foreign Players ===
- 2006:

Goalkeeper: Emilian Dolha (Wisła Kraków)
Defender (football): Edson (Legia Warszawa), Cléber (Wisła Kraków), Dickson Choto (Legia Warszawa), Veselin Đoković (Korona Kielce)
Midfielder: Roger Guerreiro (Legia Warszawa), Henry Quinteros (Lech Poznań), Hermes (Korona Kielce), Miroslav Radović (Legia Warszawa)
Striker: Ensar Arifović (ŁKS), Edi Andradina (Pogoń).

== Piłka Nożna's Ekstraklasa All star team ==
Goalkeeper: Emilian Dolha(Wisła Kraków), Micahl Vaclavik (Zagłębie Lubin)
Right Defender: Paweł Golański(Korona Kielce), Grzegorz Bartczak(Zagłębie Lubin)
Center Defender: Dickson Choto(Legia Warszawa), Dariusz Pietrasiak(GKS Bełchatów), Cléber Guedes de Lima (Wisła Kraków), Michał Stasiak(Zagłębie Lubin)
Left Defender: Manuel Arboleda(Zagłębie Lubin), Grzegorz Bronowicki(Legia Warszawa)
Right Midfield: Jakub Błaszczykowski(Wisła Kraków), Miroslav Radović(Legia Warszawa)
CenterMidfield: Maciej Iwański(Zagłębie Lubin), Tomasz Jarzębowski(GKS Bełchatów), Rafał Murawski(Lech Poznań), Dariusz Dudka(Wisła Kraków)
Left Midfield: Łukasz Garguła(GKS Bełchatów), Roger Guerreiro(Legia Warszawa)
Striker: Piotr Reiss(Lech Poznań), Adrian Sikora(Dyskobolia Grodzisk), Michał Chałbiński(Zagłębie Lubin), Łukasz Piszczek(Zagłębie Lubin).

== Attendances ==
No.	Club	Average	Highest
1	Lech Poznań	15,068	26,000
2	Legia Warszawa	10,093	13,000
3	Korona Kielce	10,003	15,500
4	Wisła Kraków	9,967	15,000
5	Górnik Zabrze	8,298	14,000
6	Widzew Łódź	7,695	10,000
7	Arka Gdynia	7,536	11,000
8	Zagłębie Lubin	6,213	10,500
9	Bełchatów	5,513	7,500
10	Pogoń Szczecin	5,467	14,000
11	ŁKS	5,467	9,000
12	Cracovia	4,023	6,500
13	Górnik Łęczna	3,387	6,000
14	Odra Wodzisław Śląski	3,207	5,500
15	Wisła Płock	3,142	7,000
16	Dyskobolia	2,289	5,500
