= Tomasz Jarzębowski =

Polish footballer (born 1978)

Personal information
- Full name: Tomasz Jarzębowski
- Date of birth: 16 November 1978 (age 47)
- Place of birth: Warsaw, Poland
- Height: 1.82 m (5 ft 11 1/2 in)
- Position: Defensive midfielder

Team information
- Current team: Legia Warsaw U19 (individual development coach)

Youth career
- 1992–1993: Legia Warsaw
- 1993–1996: Agrykola Warsaw

Senior career*
| Years | Team | Apps | (Gls) |
| 1997–2005 | Legia Warsaw | 79 | (10) |
| 2006–2008 | GKS Bełchatów | 78 | (12) |
| 2009–2010 | Legia Warsaw | 22 | (0) |
| 2010–2011 | Miedź Legnica | 17 | (5) |
| 2011–2014 | Arka Gdynia | 83 | (10) |
| 2014–2016 | Wigry Suwałki | 46 | (2) |
| Total | | 325 | (39) |

International career
| 2003–2004 | Poland | 2 | (0) |
- * Club domestic league appearances and goals

Tomasz Jarzębowski (born 16 November 1978) is a Polish former professional footballer who played as a defensive midfielder. He currently works for Legia Warsaw as an individual development coach for their under-19 team.

He has also made two appearances for the Poland national football team.

== Honours ==
Legia Warsaw

- Ekstraklasa: 2001–02
- Polish League Cup: 2001–02
