= Maciej Iwański =

Polish footballer (born 1981)

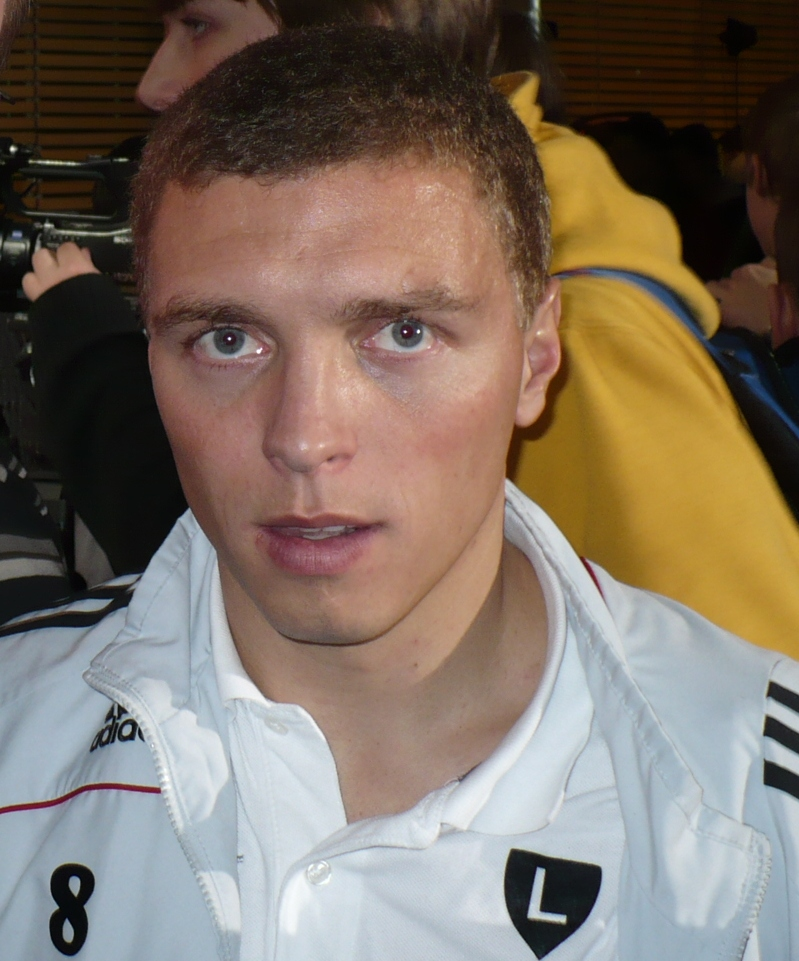
- Iwański with Legia Warsaw in 2009

Personal information
- Full name: Maciej Stanisław Iwański
- Date of birth: 7 May 1981 (age 45)
- Place of birth: Kraków, Poland
- Height: 1.71 m (5 ft 7 in)
- Position: Midfielder

Team information
- Current team: Soła Oświęcim (player-chairman)
- Number: 17

Youth career
- Omag Oświęcim

Senior career*
Years	Team	Apps	(Gls)
1999–2000	Unia Oświęcim		
2000–2005	Szczakowianka Jaworzno	70	(17)
2005–2008	Zagłębie Lubin	96	(27)
2008–2011	Legia Warsaw	71	(12)
2011	Manisaspor	13	(1)
2012	ŁKS Łódź	13	(0)
2012–2013	Manisaspor	32	(3)
2013–2015	Podbeskidzie Bielsko-Biała	48	(8)
2015–2016	Ruch Chorzów	25	(1)
2017–2018	Unia Oświęcim	21	(1)
2024–	Soła Oświęcim	4	(1)

International career
- Poland U21
2006–2010	Poland	10	(2)
- * Club domestic league appearances and goals as of 14:06, 21 June 2025 (UTC)

Maciej Stanisław Iwański (born 7 May 1981) is a Polish footballer who plays as a midfielder for Klasa B club Soła Oświęcim, and also serves as the club's chairman.

== Club career ==
After Zagłębie Lubin's relegation for match-fixing, many of the top teams in the first division fought for Iwański's signature. Legia Warsaw finally completed a move in the summer 2008, and Iwański became the most expensive transfer between two Polish clubs. He retired in 2018 after a year-long stint at Unia Oświęcim.

In January 2020, he was appointed chairman of Soła Oświęcim. In July 2024, Iwański resumed playing after Soła re-established their senior team.

== International career ==
A former U21 international, Iwański debuted in the senior side on 6 December 2006 in a friendly game versus UAE in Abu Zabi. On 3 February 2007, he scored his first international goal against Estonia.

== Honours ==
Zagłębie Lubin

- Ekstraklasa: 2006–07
- Polish Super Cup: 2007

Legia Warsaw

- Polish Cup: 2010–11
- Polish Super Cup: 2008
