= 2007–08 Polish Cup =

Tournament details
- Country: Poland
- Teams: 65

Final positions
- Champions: Legia Warsaw
- Runners-up: Wisła Kraków

Tournament statistics
- Matches played: 65
- Goals scored: 173 (2.66 per match)
- Top goal scorer(s): Paweł Buzała (6 goals)

The 2007–08 Polish Cup was the fifty-fourth season of the annual Polish cup competition. It began on 1 August 2007 with the extra preliminary round and ended on 13 May 2008 with the Final, played at Stadion GKS, Bełchatów. The winners qualified for the first qualifying round of the UEFA Cup. Dyskobolia Grodzisk Wielkopolski were the defending champions.

== Extra preliminary round ==
Team 1	Score	Team 2
1 August 2007
Jeziorak Iława	w/o^{1}	Jagiellonia II Białystok
Korona III Kielce	0–4	Sandecja II Nowy Sącz
Nielba Wągrowiec	3–0	GKP Gorzów Wielkopolski
Przyszłość Rogów	w/o^{2}	Polonia Przemyśl

Notes

- Note 1: Jagiellonia II Białystok withdrew from the competition and Jeziorak Iława were awarded a 3–0 walkover.
- Note 2: Polonia Przemyśl withdrew from the competition and Przyszłość Rogów were awarded a 3–0 walkover.

== Preliminary round ==
Team 1	Score	Team 2
31 July 2007
Znicz Pruszków	3–1	Start Krasnystaw
7 August 2007
KSZO II Ostrowiec Świętokrzyski	1–2	Przyszłość Rogów
Okocimski KS Brzesko	2–1	Concordia Piotrków Trybunalski
8 August 2007
Ruch Wysokie Mazowieckie	w/o^{1}	Olimpia Elbląg
KP Sopot	0–1	Jeziorak Iława
Skalnik Gracze	w/o^{2}	Zagłębie II Lubin
Stal Sanok	0–1	Sandecja II Nowy Sącz
Pogoń Oleśnica	3–1	Lechia Zielona Góra
Włókniarz Konstantynów Łódzki	2–1	Lech Rypin
Orlęta Radzyń Podlaski	2–3	Start Otwock
Victoria Koronowo	3–2	Nielba Wągrowiec
Jarota Jarocin	3–0	KP Police
GKS 71 Tychy	2–0	TOR Dobrzeń Wielki
Leśnik/Rossa Manowo	1–1 (a.e.t.) (3–4 p)	Bytovia II Bytów

Notes

- Note 1: Olimpia Elbląg withdrew from the competition and Ruch Wysokie Mazowieckie were awarded a 3–0 walkover.
- Note 2: Zagłębie II Lubin withdrew from the competition and Skalnik Gracze were awarded a 3–0 walkover.

== Round 1 ==
Team 1	Score	Team 2
28 August 2007
Ruch Wysokie Mazowieckie	0–2	Jagiellonia Białystok
Okocimski KS Brzesko	0–2	Zagłębie Sosnowiec
29 August 2007
Jeziorak Iława	3–1	ŁKS Łomża
Znicz Pruszków	1–0	Piast Gliwice
Przyszłość Rogów	1–2	Unia Janikowo
Sandecja II Nowy Sącz	0–0 (a.e.t.) (3–2 p)	Podbeskidzie Bielsko-Biała
Pogoń Oleśnica	3–0	Górnik Polkowice
Włókniarz Konstantynów Łódzki	0–0 (a.e.t.) (1–3 p)	Stal Stalowa Wola
Start Otwock	2–1	Polonia Bytom
Victoria Koronowo	1–0	KSZO Ostrowiec Świętokrzyski
Jarota Jarocin	1–4	Lechia Gdańsk
GKS 71 Tychy	3–0	Kmita Zabierzów
Bytovia II Bytów	0–1	Polonia Warsaw
Miedź Legnica	2–3	Śląsk Wrocław
Zawisza Bydgoszcz	w/o^{1}	Ruch Chorzów
4 September 2007
Skalnik Gracze	2–3	Odra Opole

Notes

- Note 1: Zawisza Bydgoszcz withdrew from the competition and Ruch Chorzów were awarded a 3–0 walkover.

== Round 2 ==
Team 1	Score	Team 2
25 September 2007
Jagiellonia Białystok	2–4	Widzew Łódź
Pogoń Oleśnica	0–3	Wisła Płock
Polonia Warsaw	3–2	Lech Poznań
Victoria Koronowo	0–3	Zagłębie Lubin
Odra Opole	1–0	GKS Bełchatów
Sandecja II Nowy Sącz	0–4	Legia Warsaw
26 September 2007
Śląsk Wrocław	2–2 (a.e.t.) (4–5 p)	Wisła Kraków
GKS 71 Tychy	0–0 (a.e.t.) (4–2 p)	Odra Wodzisław Śląski
Lechia Gdańsk	2–2 (a.e.t.) (5–4 p)	Górnik Zabrze
Znicz Pruszków	2–5	Cracovia
Ruch Chorzów	2–0	Górnik Łęczna
Jeziorak Iława	1–2	Dyskobolia Grodzisk Wlkp.
Stal Stalowa Wola	w/o^{1}	Pogoń Szczecin
Unia Janikowo	1–2	Arka Gdynia
Start Otwock	0–1	ŁKS Łódź
10 October 2007
Zagłębie Sosnowiec	0–2	Korona Kielce

Notes

- Note 1: Pogoń Szczecin withdrew from the competition and Stal Stalowa Wola were awarded a 3–0 walkover.

== Round 3 ==
Team 1	Score	Team 2
30 October 2007
Ruch Chorzów	1–0	Widzew Łódź
Odra Opole	0–2	Zagłębie Lubin
Polonia Warsaw	3–1	Korona Kielce
31 October 2007
Cracovia	0–1	Arka Gdynia
GKS 71 Tychy	1–3	Wisła Kraków
Stal Stalowa Wola	1–3	Dyskobolia Grodzisk Wlkp.
Legia Warsaw	1–0	ŁKS Łódź
18 November 2007
Lechia Gdańsk	5–1	Wisła Płock

== Quarter-finals ==
Team 1	Agg.	Team 2	1st leg	2nd leg
Dyskobolia Grodzisk Wlkp.	2–1	Ruch Chorzów	1–0	1–1
Arka Gdynia	1–2	Wisła Kraków	0–0	1–2
Zagłębie Lubin	8–2	Polonia Warsaw	5–0	3–2
Legia Warsaw	2–0	Lechia Gdańsk	1–0	1–0

=== First leg ===
1 April 2008	Dyskobolia Grodzisk Wlkp.	1–0	Ruch Chorzów	Grodzisk Wielkopolski
18:00 CEST (UTC+02:00)	Ivanovski 15'			Stadium: Stadion Dyskobolia; Attendance: 800; Referee: Jarosław Żyro (Bydgoszcz)

1 April 2008	Arka Gdynia	0–0	Wisła Kraków	Gdynia
18:15 CEST (UTC+02:00)				Stadium: Stadion GOSiR; Attendance: 11,000; Referee: Piotr Pielak (Warsaw)

1 April 2008	Legia Warsaw	1–0	Lechia Gdańsk	Warsaw
18:15 CEST (UTC+02:00)	Wawrzyniak 64'			Stadium: Polish Army Stadium; Attendance: 5,500; Referee: Paweł Gil (Lublin)

1 April 2008	Zagłębie Lubin	5–0	Polonia Warsaw	Lubin
19:00 CEST (UTC+02:00)	Iwański 18'; Rui Miguel 27', 55'; Chałbiński 38', 75'			Stadium: Stadion GOS; Attendance: 3,000; Referee: Robert Małek (Zabrze)

=== Second leg ===
8 April 2008	Ruch Chorzów	1–1 (1–2 agg.)	Dyskobolia Grodzisk Wlkp.	Chorzów
17:45 CEST (UTC+02:00)	Fabus 18'		Batata 90'	Stadium: Stadion Ruchu Chorzów; Attendance: 2,000; Referee: Adam Kajzer (Rzeszów)

9 April 2008	Polonia Warsaw	2–3 (2–8 agg.)	Zagłębie Lubin	Warsaw
17:45 CEST (UTC+02:00)	Piechna 5', 87'		Włodarczyk 27'; Plizga 59', 68'	Stadium: Stadion Polonii; Attendance: 800; Referee: Robert Kubas (Rzeszów)

9 April 2008	Lechia Gdańsk	0–1 (0–2 agg.)	Legia Warsaw	Gdańsk
17:45 CEST (UTC+02:00)			Guerreiro 86'	Stadium: Stadion Lechii; Attendance: 11,000; Referee: Mariusz Żak (Sosnowiec)

9 April 2008	Wisła Kraków	2–1 (2–1 agg.)	Arka Gdynia	Kraków
20:00 CEST (UTC+02:00)	Zieńczuk 44'; Cantoro 67'		Przytuła 90+4'	Stadium: Wisła Stadium; Attendance: 7,000; Referee: Marcin Szulc (Warsaw)

== Semi-finals ==
Team 1	Agg.	Team 2	1st leg	2nd leg
Legia Warsaw	1–1 (a)	Zagłębie Lubin	0–0	1–1
Wisła Kraków	1–0	Dyskobolia Grodzisk Wlkp.	0–0	1–0

=== First leg ===
22 April 2008	Legia Warsaw	0–0	Zagłębie Lubin	Warsaw
18:00 CEST (UTC+02:00)				Stadium: Polish Army Stadium; Attendance: 2,000; Referee: Mirosław Górecki (Katowice)

23 April 2008	Wisła Kraków	0–0	Dyskobolia Grodzisk Wlkp.	Kraków
20:30 CEST (UTC+02:00)				Stadium: Wisła Stadium; Attendance: 5,000; Referee: Robert Małek (Zabrze)

=== Second leg ===
30 April 2008	Dyskobolia Grodzisk Wlkp.	0–1 (0–1 agg.)	Wisła Kraków	Grodzisk Wielkopolski
19:45 CEST (UTC+02:00)			Brożek 65'	Stadium: Stadion Dyskobolia; Attendance: 1,500; Referee: Marcin Borski (Warsaw)

30 April 2008	Zagłębie Lubin	1–1 (1–1 (a) agg.)	Legia Warsaw	Lubin
20:00 CEST (UTC+02:00)	Pawłowski 30'		Chinyama 59'	Stadium: Stadion GOS; Attendance: 5,000; Referee: Jarosław Żyro (Bydgoszcz)

== Final ==
13 May 2008
17:00 CEST (UTC+02:00)

Wisła Kraków	0–0 (a.e.t.)	Legia Warsaw
	Report
Penalties
Głowacki (penalty scored); Zieńczuk (penalty scored); Cléber (penalty scored); Paulista (penalty missed); Baszczyński (penalty missed)	3–4	(penalty scored) Szala; (penalty scored) Guerreiro; (penalty scored) Smoliński; (penalty missed) Vuković; (penalty scored) Wawrzyniak

Stadion GKS, Bełchatów
Attendance: 5,000
Referee: Grzegorz Gilewski (Radom)

Wisła Kraków	Legia Warsaw

GK	81	(Poland) Mariusz Pawełek
DF	4	(Poland) Marcin Baszczyński
DF	6	(Poland) Arkadiusz Głowacki (c)
DF	25	(Brazil) Cléber	(yellow card) 116'
DF	8	(Poland) Piotr Brożek
MF	7	(Poland) Radosław Sobolewski
MF	21	(Poland) Wojciech Łobodziński		(substituted off) 60'
MF	20	(Argentina) Mauro Cantoro	(yellow card) 26'
MF	17	(Poland) Marek Zieńczuk
FW	9	(Poland) Rafał Boguski		(substituted off) 99'
FW	11	(Poland) Radosław Matusiak		(substituted off) 46'
Substitutes:
FW	10	(Brazil) Jean Paulista		(substituted on) 46'	(yellow card) 55'
MF	16	(Czech Republic) Tomáš Jirsák		(substituted on) 60'
MF	15	(Costa Rica) Junior Diaz		(substituted on) 99'
Manager:
(Poland) Maciej Skorża

GK	82	(Slovakia) Ján Mucha
DF	3	(Poland) Wojciech Szala	(yellow card) 69'
DF	26	(Spain) Iñaki Astiz
DF	4	(Zimbabwe) Dickson Choto
DF	24	(Poland) Jakub Wawrzyniak	(yellow card) 32'
MF	32	(Serbia) Miroslav Radović
MF	14	(Serbia) Aleksandar Vuković (c)
MF	6	(Poland) Roger Guerreiro	(yellow card) 110'
MF	31	(Poland) Maciej Rybus		(substituted off) 80'
FW	18	(Poland) Bartłomiej Grzelak		(substituted off) 84'
FW	19	(Zimbabwe) Takesure Chinyama		(substituted off) 112'
Substitutes:
MF	33	(Poland) Kamil Majkowski		(substituted on) 80'	(yellow card) 90+5'
MF	36	(Poland) Ariel Borysiuk		(substituted on) 84'	(yellow card) 117'
MF	3	(Poland) Marcin Smoliński		(substituted on) 112'
Manager:
(Poland) Jan Urban
