= Ekstraklasa Cup =

- Founded: 2006
- Abolished: 2009
- Region: Poland
- Teams: 16
- Last champions: Śląsk Wrocław (1st title)
- Most championships: Dyskobolia Grodzisk Wielkopolski (2 titles)

The Ekstraklasa Cup (Polish: Puchar Ekstraklasy) was an elimination tournament for Polish football clubs that played in the Polish Ekstraklasa. The Ekstraklasa Cup was the fourth attempt at introducing a League Cup competition in Poland. The first such tournament was a one-off tournament held in 1952 which Wawel Kraków won. Two other tournaments have also been held, the League Cup (1977–1978) and the Polish League Cup (1999–2002), these two tournaments mainly being cancelled due to a lack of interest from fans. A League Cup competition was again tried with the Ekstraklasa Cup in 2006, however this tournament again saw little interest from fans and the cup competition was cancelled in 2009 after the broadcasting rights expired.

The format of the tournament resembled that of the UEFA Champions League. The Ekstraklasa Cup consisted of 16 teams, which were broken up to 4 groups with 4 teams, that played on home and away basis, with top two teams qualifying out of each group and playing out the rest of the tournament in a knockout phase.

== Ekstraklasa Cup champions ==
- 2006–07 GKS Bełchatów 0–1 Dyskobolia Grodzisk Wielkopolski
- 2007–08 Dyskobolia Grodzisk Wielkopolski 4–1 Legia Warsaw
- 2008–09 Odra Wodzisław 0–1 Śląsk Wrocław

== Performance by club ==
Club	Winners	Runners-up	Winning years
Dyskobolia Grodzisk Wielkopolski	2	–	2006–07, 2007–08
Śląsk Wrocław	1	–	2008–09
Legia Warsaw	–	1	–
GKS Bełchatów	–	1	–
Odra Wodzisław	–	1	–
