= 2012–13 Legia Warsaw season =

Legia Warsaw
2012–13 season
- Manager: Jan Urban
- Stadium: Pepsi Arena
- Ekstraklasa: 1st
- Polish Cup: Winners
- Polish Super Cup: Runners-up
- UEFA Europa League: Play-off round
- Top goalscorer: League: Danijel Ljuboja (12)
- Biggest win: 5–0 v Śląsk Wrocław (Home, 2 June 2013, Ekstraklasa)
- Biggest defeat: 1–2 v Ried (Away, 2 August 2012, UEFA Europa League); 1–2 v Rosenborg (Away, 30 August 2012, UEFA Europa League); 1–2 v Jagiellonia Białystok (Home, 10 November 2012, Ekstraklasa); 0–1 v Śląsk Wrocław (Away, 7 December 2012, Ekstraklasa); 2–3 v Korona Kielce (Away, 23 February 2013, Ekstraklasa); 0–1 v Śląsk Wrocław (Home, 8 May 2013, Polish Cup)
Home colours	Away colours	Third colours

The 2012–13 season was Legia Warsaw's 66th consecutive season in the Ekstraklasa and 78th season in existence as a football club. In addition to the domestic league, the club participated in that season's editions of the Polish Cup, the Polish Super Cup and the UEFA Europa League.

== Squad ==
Squad at end of season

Note: Flags indicate national team as defined under FIFA eligibility rules; some limited exceptions apply. Players may hold more than one non-FIFA nationality.

No.	Pos.	Nation	Player
2	DF	POL	Artur Jędrzejczyk
3	DF	POL	Tomasz Jodłowiec
4	DF	ZIM	Dickson Choto
5	MF	POL	Janusz Gol
6	DF	POL	Michał Żewłakow
8	DF	SVN	Marko Šuler
9	FW	POL	Marek Saganowski
12	GK	SVK	Dušan Kuciak
13	FW	GEO	Vladimir Dvalishvili
14	DF	POL	Jakub Wawrzyniak
15	DF	ESP	Iñaki Astiz
17	DF	POL	Tomasz Brzyski
18	FW	POL	Michał Kucharczyk
19	MF	POL	Bartosz Bereszyński

No.	Pos.	Nation	Player
20	FW	POL	Jakub Kosecki
21	MF	CRO	Ivica Vrdoljak
22	MF	POL	Michał Kopczyński
23	GK	UKR	Ihor Berezovskyi
24	FW	POL	Michał Efir
25	DF	POL	Jakub Rzeźniczak
28	FW	SRB	Danijel Ljuboja
32	MF	SRB	Miroslav Radović
33	MF	POL	Michał Żyro
35	MF	POL	Daniel Łukasik
37	MF	POL	Dominik Furman
84	GK	POL	Wojciech Skaba
93	GK	POL	Oliwer Wienczatek

== Competitions ==
=== Overview ===
Competition	First match	Last match	Starting round	Final position	Record							
Competition	First match	Last match	Starting round	Final position	Pld	W	D	L	GF	GA	GD	Win %
Ekstraklasa	19 August 2012	2 June 2013	Matchday 1	Winners	30	20	7	3	59	22	+37	66.67
Polish Cup	5 August 2012	8 May 2013	Round of 32	Winners	8	6	1	1	16	5	+11	75.00
Polish Super Cup	12 August 2012		Final	Runners-up	1	0	1	0	1	1	+0	0.00
UEFA Europa League	19 July 2012	30 August 2012	Second qualifying round	Play-off round	6	2	2	2	13	9	+4	33.33
Total					45	28	11	6	89	37	+52	62.22

Source: Competitions

=== Ekstraklasa ===
==== League table ====
Pos	Team	Pld	W	D	L	GF	GA	GD	Pts	Qualification or relegation
1	Legia Warsaw (C)	30	20	7	3	59	22	+37	67	Qualification to Champions League second qualifying round
2	Lech Poznań	30	19	4	7	46	22	+24	61	Qualification to Europa League second qualifying round
3	Śląsk Wrocław	30	13	8	9	44	42	+2	47	Qualification to Europa League second qualifying round
4	Piast Gliwice (Note: Since both finalists of 2012–13 Polish Cup, Legia Warsaw and Śląsk Wrocław, finished top three, 4th-placed Piast Gliwice also qualified for Europa League.)	30	13	7	10	41	41	0	46	Qualification to Europa League second qualifying round
5	Górnik Zabrze	30	12	7	11	35	31	+4	43	

Source: 90minut.pl (in Polish)
Rules for classification: 1) points; 2) head-to-head points; 3) head-to-head goal difference; 4) head-to-head goals scored; 5) goal difference; 6) number of goals scored; 7) Fair Play table. Head-to-head record is used only after all the matches between the teams in question have been played
(C) Champions

==== Results summary ====
Overall								Home						Away					
Pld	W	D	L	GF	GA	GD	Pts	W	D	L	GF	GA	GD	W	D	L	GF	GA	GD
30	20	7	3	59	22	+37	67	12	2	1	33	8	+25	8	5	2	26	14	+12

Source: Soccerway

==== Results by round ====
Round	1	2	3	4	5	6	7	8	9	10	11	12	13	14	15	16	17	18	19	20	21	22	23	24	25	26	27	28	29	30
Ground	H	A	H	A	H	A	H	A	H	A	H	A	H	H	A	A	H	A	H	A	H	A	H	A	H	A	H	A	A	H
Result	W	W	W	D	D	D	W	W	W	W	L	W	W	W	L	L	D	W	W	W	W	W	W	D	W	W	W	D	D	W
Position	2	1	1	2	2	2	1	1	1	1	1	1	1	1	1	1	1	1	1	1	1	1	1	1	1	1	1	1	1	1
Points	3	6	9	10	11	12	15	18	21	24	24	27	30	33	33	33	34	37	40	43	46	49	52	53	56	59	62	63	64	67

Source: Worldfootball.net
A = Away; H = Home; W = Win; D = Draw; L = Loss

==== Matches ====
19 August 2012 1	Legia Warsaw	4–0	Korona Kielce	Warsaw
17:00 CEST (UTC+2)	Ljuboja 20' (pen.), 42', 51'; Łukasik (yellow card) 54'; Jędrzejczyk (yellow card) 84'; Staňo 87' (o.g.)	Report	Lech (yellow card) 17'; Staňo (yellow card) 20'	Stadium: Pepsi Arena

26 August 2012 2	GKS Bełchatów	0–2	Legia Warsaw	Bełchatów
17:00 CEST (UTC+2)	Baran (yellow card) 38'; Mak (yellow card) 41'; Buzała (yellow card) 61'	Report	Saganowski 11'; Ljuboja (yellow card) 38'; Żyro 53'; Jędrzejczyk (yellow card) 68'; Żewłakow (yellow card) 77'	Stadium: GIEKSA Arena

3 September 2012 3	Legia Warsaw	3–1	Podbeskidzie Bielsko-Biała	Warsaw
18:30 CEST (UTC+2)	Astiz (yellow card) 24'; Żyro 83'; Furman 87'; Wawrzyniak (yellow card) 90+1'; Radović 90+4'	Report	Demjan 13'; Król (yellow card) 36'; Byrtek (yellow card) 76'; Náther (yellow card) 84'; Zajac (yellow card) 90+2'	Stadium: Pepsi Arena

16 September 2012 4	Górnik Zabrze	2–2	Legia Warsaw	Zabrze
17:00 CEST (UTC+2)	Oziębała 81'; Danch 90'	Report	Saganowski 4'; Astiz (yellow card) 51'; Radović (yellow card) 64'; Furman 82'	Stadium: Ernest Pohl Stadium

21 September 2012 5	Legia Warsaw	1–1	Polonia Warsaw	Warsaw
20:30 CEST (UTC+2)	Ljuboja 33' (pen.)	Report	Dvalishvili 29'; Pazio (yellow card) 45'; Isidoro (yellow card) 47'; Kokoszka (yellow card) 77'	Stadium: Pepsi Arena

29 September 2012 6	Zagłębie Lubin	2–2	Legia Warsaw	Lubin
18:00 CEST (UTC+2)	Papadopulos 36'; Jež 56'; Małkowski (yellow card) 63'	Report	Łukasik (yellow card) 37'; Saganowski 45', 78'; Kucharczyk (yellow card) 89'	Stadium: Lubin Stadium

5 October 2012 7	Legia Warsaw	2–1	Wisła Kraków	Warsaw
20:45 CEST (UTC+2)	Rzeźniczak (yellow card) 13'; Kosecki 17', 25'; Salinas (yellow card) 53'; Jędrzejczyk (yellow card) 73'	Report	Garguła 13'; Wilk (yellow card) 18' (yellow-red card) 74'	Stadium: Pepsi Arena

22 October 2012 8	Pogoń Szczecin	0–3	Legia Warsaw	Szczecin
18:30 CEST (UTC+2)	Golla (yellow card) 4'; Dąbrowski (yellow card) 25' (yellow-red card) 57'; Hernâni (yellow card) 28' (yellow-red card) 78'; Rogalski (yellow card) 46'	Report	Ljuboja 15', 86'; Kosecki 21'; Wawrzyniak (yellow card) 22'; Astiz (yellow card) 34'	Stadium: Florian Krygier Municipal Stadium

28 October 2012 9	Legia Warsaw	3–2	Piast Gliwice	Warsaw
17:00 CET (UTC+1)	Ljuboja 45', 83'; Radović (yellow card) 53'; Jędrzejczyk (yellow card) 66', (goal) 82'; Kuciak (yellow card) 76'	Report	Mido (yellow card) 22'; Cuerda 30'; Kędziora 32'; Zganiacz (yellow card) 90+1'	Stadium: Pepsi Arena

4 November 2012 10	Lechia Gdańsk	1–2	Legia Warsaw	Gdańsk
14:30 CET (UTC+1)	Janicki (yellow card) 21'; Traoré 69'; Kacprzycki (yellow card) 71'	Report	Rzeźniczak (yellow card) 25'; Radović 36'; Ljuboja 73'; Jędrzejczyk (yellow card) 87'	Stadium: PGE Arena Gdańsk

10 November 2012 11	Legia Warsaw	1–2	Jagiellonia Białystok	Warsaw
18:00 CET (UTC+1)	Kosecki (yellow card) 40'; Kucharczyk (yellow card) 45+1'; Rzeźniczak 53'; Łukasik (yellow card) 65'; Radović (yellow card) 66'; Jędrzejczyk (yellow card) 75'; Astiz (yellow card) 90+5'	Report	Plizga 37'; Ukah (yellow card) 40'; Frankowski 76'; Dzalamidze (yellow card) 87'; Słowik (yellow card) 90+2'	Stadium: Pepsi Arena

18 November 2012 12	Lech Poznań	1–3	Legia Warsaw	Poznań
14:30 CET (UTC+1)	Trałka (yellow card) 41'; Wołąkiewicz (yellow card) 67'; Ślusarski 74'; Linetty (yellow card) 76'	Report	Kosecki 10'; Wawrzyniak 14'; Rzeźniczak (yellow card) 27'; Radović 32'; Łukasik (yellow card) 90'	Stadium: Poznań Stadium

23 November 2012 13	Legia Warsaw	1–0	Widzew Łódź	Warsaw
20:45 CET (UTC+1)	Żyro (yellow card) 21'; Wawrzyniak (yellow card) 41'; Kosecki 47'; Rzeźniczak (yellow card) 80'	Report	Kaczmarek (yellow card) 12'; Bartoszewicz (yellow card) 84'	Stadium: Pepsi Arena

2 December 2012 14	Legia Warsaw	3–0	Ruch Chorzów	Warsaw
17:00 CET (UTC+1)	Kosecki 29', 64'; Astiz (yellow card) 38' (yellow-red card) 63'; Ljuboja 73'	Report	Panka (yellow card) 15'; Szyndrowski (yellow card) 25'; Starzyński (yellow card) 57'; Đokić (yellow card) 60' (yellow-red card) 62'; Malinowski (yellow card) 90'	Stadium: Pepsi Arena

7 December 2012 15	Śląsk Wrocław	1–0	Legia Warsaw	Wrocław
20:45 CET (UTC+1)	Socha (yellow card) 12'; Pawelec (yellow card) 38'; Jodłowiec 56'	Report	Astiz (yellow card) 42'	Stadium: Stadion Miejski

23 February 2013 16	Korona Kielce	3–2	Legia Warsaw	Kielce
18:00 CET (UTC+1)	Jovanović (yellow card) 17'; Korzym 32', (yellow card) 50'; Lenartowski 47'; Kuzera (yellow card) 61'; Kijanskas 73'	Report	Kosecki 22', (yellow card) 39'; Vrdoljak (yellow card) 31'; Łukasik (yellow card) 45+3'; Astiz 67'; Radović (yellow card) 77'	Stadium: Stadion Miejski

2 March 2013 17	Legia Warsaw	0–0	GKS Bełchatów	Warsaw
18:30 CET (UTC+1)	Ljuboja (yellow card) 35'	Report	Kosznik (yellow card) 37'; Wilusz (yellow card) 39'; Madej (yellow card) 69'; Sawala (yellow card) 72'; Wacławczyk (yellow card) 75'	Stadium: Pepsi Arena

8 March 2013 18	Podbeskidzie Bielsko-Biała	1–2	Legia Warsaw	Bielsko-Biała
20:45 CET (UTC+1)	Łatka (yellow card); Sloboda (yellow card) 18'; Telichowski (yellow card) 25'; Pawela (yellow card) 32'; Zajac (yellow card) 62'; Demjan 73'	Report	Vrdoljak (yellow card) 14'; Saganowski 53'; Wawrzyniak (yellow card) 58', (goal) 76'	Stadium: Bielsko-Biała Stadium

15 March 2013 19	Legia Warsaw	3–0	Górnik Zabrze	Warsaw
20:45 CET (UTC+1)	Saganowski 33'; Ljuboja 67'; Jędrzejczyk (yellow card) 77'; Bereszyński (yellow card) 83'; Dvalishvili 90+3'	Report	Danch (yellow card) 44'; Mączyński (yellow card) 66'	Stadium: Pepsi Arena

30 March 2013 20	Polonia Warsaw	1–2	Legia Warsaw	Warsaw
18:00 CET (UTC+1)	Wszołek (yellow card) 11'; Tosik (yellow card) 16'; Todorovski (yellow card) 51'; Hołota (yellow card) 71'; Baran (yellow card) 82'; Piątek 87'	Report	Wawrzyniak (yellow card) 10'; Ljuboja 52'; Furman 90+1'	Stadium: Stadion Polonii Warszawa

6 April 2013 21	Legia Warsaw	2–0	Zagłębie Lubin	Warsaw
18:00 CEST (UTC+2)	Kuciak (yellow card) 29'; Astiz (yellow card) 29'; Radović 45'; Dvalishvili 60'; Bereszyński (yellow card) 85'; Vrdoljak (yellow card) 90'	Report	Hanzel (yellow card) 44'; Vidanov (yellow card) 45+1'; Čotra (yellow card) 50'; Woźniak (yellow card) 87'	Stadium: Pepsi Arena

13 April 2013 22	Wisła Kraków	1–2	Legia Warsaw	Kraków
18:00 CEST (UTC+2)	Głowacki (yellow card) 45'; Burliga (yellow card) 70'; Sikorski 87'; Pareiko (yellow card) 90+7'	Report	Vrdoljak (yellow card) 7'; Dvalishvili 12'; Jędrzejczyk 16', (yellow card) 37'; Kosecki (yellow card) 44'; Kuciak (yellow card) 90+7'	Stadium: Henryk Reyman Municipal Stadium

20 April 2013 23	Legia Warsaw	3–1	Pogoń Szczecin	Warsaw
18:15 CEST (UTC+2)	Vrdoljak 54' (pen.); Dvalishvili 59' (pen.); Brzyski 75'	Report	Ława 11'; Janukiewicz (yellow card) 58'	Stadium: Pepsi Arena

27 April 2013 24	Piast Gliwice	0–0	Legia Warsaw	Gliwice
18:00 CEST (UTC+2)	Murawski (yellow card) 56'; Matras (yellow card) 90+1'	Report	Łukasik (yellow card) 90+1'; Dvalishvili (yellow card) 90+3'	Stadium: Stadion Piast

5 May 2013 25	Legia Warsaw	1–0	Lechia Gdańsk	Warsaw
14:30 CEST (UTC+2)	Vrdoljak (yellow card) 6'; Astiz (yellow card) 24'; Kosecki 63'	Report	Pietrowski (yellow card) 55'; Janicki (yellow card) 65'; Deleu (yellow card) 90+5'	Stadium: Pepsi Arena

11 May 2013 26	Jagiellonia Białystok	0–3	Legia Warsaw	Białystok
18:00 CEST (UTC+2)	Norambuena (red card) 10'; Ukah (yellow card) 24'	Report	Jodłowiec 2'; Dvalishvili (penalty missed) 11', 65'; Kucharczyk 56'	Stadium: Stadion Miejski

18 May 2013 27	Legia Warsaw	1–0	Lech Poznań	Warsaw
13:30 CEST (UTC+2)	Łukasik (yellow card) 34'; Kosecki (yellow card) 45+2'; Jędrzejczyk (yellow card) 53'; Vrdoljak 86' (pen.)	Report	Ceesay (yellow card) 13'; Możdżeń (yellow card) 36' (red card) 84'; Kędziora (yellow card) 57'	Stadium: Pepsi Arena

24 May 2013 28	Widzew Łódź	1–1	Legia Warsaw	Łódź
20:45 CEST (UTC+2)	Broź 19' (pen.); Kasprzak (yellow card) 60'	Report	Jędrzejczyk (yellow card) 22'; Saganowski 56'; Bereszyński (yellow card) 65'	Stadium: Widzew Łódź Stadium

30 May 2013 29	Ruch Chorzów	0–0	Legia Warsaw	Chorzów
18:00 CEST (UTC+2)	Konczkowski (yellow card) 62'; Janoszka (yellow card) 67'	Report		Stadium: Stadion Ruchu

2 June 2013 30	Legia Warsaw	5–0	Śląsk Wrocław	Warsaw
16:00 CEST (UTC+2)	Saganowski 13', 14', 32' (pen.); Kucharczyk 39'; Radović 62'; Kosecki (yellow card) 90'	Report	Gikiewicz (yellow card) 65'; Socha (yellow card) 90'	Stadium: Pepsi Arena

=== Polish Cup ===
5 August 2012 Round of 32	Okocimski KS Brzesko	0–4	Legia Warsaw	Brzesko
17:00 CEST (UTC+2)	Jacek (yellow card) 45+1'; Wojcieszyński (yellow card) 66'; Jeriomenko (yellow card) 68'; Baliga (yellow card) 74'	Report	Kopczyński 43'; Żyro 53', 87'; Saganowski 58'	Stadium: OKS Brzesko Stadium

26 September 2012 Round of 16	Piast Gliwice	1–2	Legia Warsaw	Gliwice
18:30 CEST (UTC+2)	Cuerda 73'; Krzycki (red card) 88'	Report	Kucharczyk 42'; Salinas 60'	Stadium: Stadion Piast

26 February 2013 Quarter-finals First leg	Legia Warsaw	4–1	Olimpia Grudziądz	Warsaw
18:15 CET (UTC+1)	Saganowski 51', 90'; Jędrzejczyk 63'; Dvalishvili 90+1'	Report	Ruszkul 35'	Stadium: Pepsi Arena

26 March 2013 Quarter-finals Second leg	Olimpia Grudziądz	1–2 (2–6 agg.)	Legia Warsaw	Grudziądz
14:30 CET (UTC+1)	Banasiak 89'	Report	Dvalishvili 73'; Saganowski 78'	Stadium: Bronisław Malinowski Central Stadium
Note: Legia Warsaw won 6–2 on aggregate.

9 April 2013 Semi-finals First leg	Ruch Chorzów	0–0	Legia Warsaw	Chorzów
18:30 CEST (UTC+2)	Lewczuk (yellow card) (yellow-red card) 38'	Report		Stadium: Stadion Ruchu

16 April 2013 Semi-finals Second leg	Legia Warsaw	2–1 (2–1 agg.)	Ruch Chorzów	Warsaw
18:30 CEST (UTC+2)	Dvalishvili 51', 60'	Report	Starzyński 54'	Stadium: Pepsi Arena
Note: Legia Warsaw won 2–1 on aggregate.

2 May 2013 Final First leg	Śląsk Wrocław	0–2	Legia Warsaw	Wrocław
18:30 CEST (UTC+2)	Pawelec (yellow card) 43'; Wasiluk (yellow card) 64'; Socha (yellow card) 73'	Report	Saganowski 32', 45'; Vrdoljak (yellow card) 47'	Stadium: Stadion Miejski

8 May 2013 Final Second leg	Legia Warsaw	0–1 (2–1 agg.)	Śląsk Wrocław	Warsaw
20:30 CEST (UTC+2)		Report	Żewłakow 2' (o.g.)	Stadium: Pepsi Arena
Note: Legia Warsaw won 2–1 on aggregate.

=== Polish Super Cup ===
As the defending Polish Cup champions, Legia Warsaw faced the reigning Ekstraklasa winners Śląsk Wrocław in the Polish Super Cup.

12 August 2012 Final	Śląsk Wrocław	1–1 (4–2 p)	Legia Warsaw	Warsaw
16:30 CEST (UTC+2)	Socha (yellow card) 26'; Elsner 39'; Stevanović (yellow card) 53'	Report	Furman (yellow card) 34'; Kosecki (yellow card) 58'; Ljuboja 59'; Jędrzejczyk (yellow card) 83'	Stadium: Pepsi Arena
	Penalties
	Mila (penalty scored); Sobota (penalty scored); Kowalczyk (penalty scored); Jodłowiec (penalty missed); Cetnarski (penalty scored)		(penalty scored) Rzeźniczak; (penalty missed) Saganowski; (penalty missed) Radović; (penalty scored) Ljuboja

=== UEFA Europa League ===
==== Qualifying ====
===== Second qualifying round =====
19 July 2012 First leg	Liepājas Metalurgs (Latvia)	2–2	(Poland) Legia Warsaw	Liepāja, Latvia
18:00 EEST (UTC+3)	Zirnis (yellow card) 25' (yellow-red card) 68'; Tamošauskas (yellow card) 33'; Leliūga 43'; Kļava (yellow card) 49', (goal) 81' (pen.)	Report	Kucharczyk 20'; Kosecki 47'; Łukasik (yellow card) 63'	Stadium: Daugava Stadium; Attendance: 3,106; Referee: Antti Munukka (Finland); Assistant referees: Jan-Peter Aravirta (Finland), Jukka Honkanen (Finland); Fourth official: Tero Nieminen (Finland)

26 July 2012 Second leg	Legia Warsaw (Poland)	5–1 (7–3 agg.)	(Latvia) Liepājas Metalurgs	Warsaw, Poland
20:30 CEST (UTC+2)	Saganowski 4', 39', 79'; Gol 57'; Żyro 61'; Jędrzejczyk (yellow card) 73'; Kosecki (yellow card) 90+2'	Report	Hmizs (yellow card) 31'; Kamešs 45+1'; Soloņicins (red card) 54'; Savaļnieks (yellow card) 65'; Tamošauskas (yellow card) 73'; Flaksis (yellow card) 88'	Stadium: Pepsi Arena; Attendance: 12,300; Referee: João Capela (Portugal); Assistant referees: Pedro Garcia (Portugal), Tiago Rocha (Portugal); Fourth official: Nuno Miguel Serrano Almeida (Portugal)
Note: Legia Warsaw won 7–3 on aggregate.

===== Third qualifying round =====
2 August 2012 First leg	Ried (Austria)	2–1	(Poland) Legia Warsaw	Ried im Innkreis, Austria
19:00 CEST (UTC+2)	Riegler (yellow card) 36'; Gartler 52'; Hadžić 62' (pen.); Gebauer (yellow card) 82'; Ziegl (yellow card) 84'	Report	Wawrzyniak (yellow card) 49' (yellow-red card) 61'; Ljuboja 85'	Stadium: Keine Sorgen Arena; Attendance: 4,200; Referee: Ante Vučemilović-Šimunović Jr. (Croatia); Assistant referees: Dalibor Conjar (Croatia), Goran Pataki (Croatia); Fourth official: Danijel Trampus (Croatia)

9 August 2012 Second leg	Legia Warsaw (Poland)	3–1 (4–3 agg.)	(Austria) Ried	Warsaw, Poland
19:00 CEST (UTC+2)	Saganowski 41'; Vrdoljak (yellow card) 48' (yellow-red card) 71'; Radović 55'; Ljuboja 63'; Šuler (yellow card) 66'; Jędrzejczyk (yellow card) 82'	Report	Hinum (yellow card) 44'; Žulj 76'	Stadium: Pepsi Arena; Attendance: 15,322; Referee: Eli Hacmon (Israel); Assistant referees: Oren Borneshtain (Israel), Abed Alramili (Israel); Fourth official: Asaf Kenan (Israel)
Note: Legia Warsaw won 4–3 on aggregate.

==== Play-off round ====
23 August 2012 First leg	Legia Warsaw (Poland)	1–1	(Norway) Rosenborg	Warsaw, Poland
19:00 CEST (UTC+2)	Astiz (yellow card) 11'; Kosecki 42'; Jędrzejczyk (yellow card) 65'	Report	Diskerud (yellow card) 35'; Dočkal (yellow card) 55', (goal) 80'	Stadium: Pepsi Arena; Attendance: 21,637; Referee: Aleksandar Stavrev (Macedonia); Assistant referees: Marjan Kirovski (Macedonia), Dejan Kostadinov (Macedonia); Fourth official: Goran Spirkoski (Macedonia)

30 August 2012 Second leg	Rosenborg (Norway)	2–1 (3–2 agg.)	(Poland) Legia Warsaw	Trondheim, Norway
19:00 CEST (UTC+2)	Reginiussen 69'; Svensson (yellow card) 71'; Diskerud 87'	Report	Radović (yellow card) 18'; Ljuboja 36'; Łukasik (yellow card) 53'; Żyro (yellow card) 85'; Kosecki (yellow card) 86'	Stadium: Lerkendal Stadion; Attendance: 8,712; Referee: Daniele Orsato (Italy); Assistant referees: Mauro Tonolini (Italy), Fabiano Preti (Italy); Fourth official: Sebastiano Peruzzo (Italy)
Note: Rosenborg won 3–2 on aggregate.
