= Bunt (community) =

Community in South-Western India

The Bunt (/ˈbʌnt/, Tulu: [bɐɳʈɐɾɯ]) people are an ethnic Tuluva community who historically have inhabited the Tulu Nadu region in South India. The Bunts were traditionally a warrior-class or martial caste community, with agrarian origins, forming the landed gentry of the region. They are the dominant land-owning, farming and banking community of Tulu Nadu and speak Tulu and Kundagannada as their mother tongue. Today, the Bunts are a largely urbanised community, with a population size of less than one million worldwide.

== Etymology ==
The word Bunt means powerful man or warrior in Tulu language. Bunts are also referred to as okkelme, which means farmers or cultivators and references their agrarian origins.

== History ==
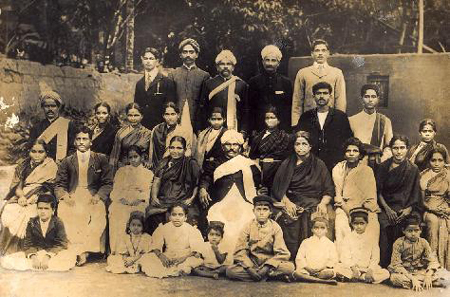
Kodial Guthu family (circa 1900). This particular Bunt family were landlords in the city of Mangalore, India Kuloor Boodu house has a history of more than two hundred years. This is the main house in northern Kasaragod

American anthropologist Sylvia Vatuk states that the Bunt community was a loosely defined social group. The matrilineal kin groups that constituted the caste were linguistically, geographically and economically diverse, which were united by their arrogation of aristocratic status and power. The Bunts speak Tulu and Kundagannada as their native language and were traditionally an agrarian caste engaged in rice cultivation. The Bunts follow a matrilineal system of inheritance called Aliyasantana. They have 93 clan names or surnames and are divided into 53 matrilineal septs called Bari. Members of the same bari did not intermarry. (Note: S. Anees Siraj quotes Ganapathi Rao Aigal, one of the earliest historians to document the history of the Kanara region) According to S. D. L. Alagodi, the Bunts "originally belonged to the warrior class. Being the martial race of Tulu Nadu, they served the ruling chiefs which brought them considerable benefits and allowed them to become the landowners and nobles of the region."

Bunt clans claim descent from the ancient Alupa dynasty (circa 2nd century CE – 15th century CE). Historian P. Gururaja Bhat mentions that the Alupa royal family were of local origin possibly belonging to the Bunt caste. The title Alupa (Alva) survives until this day among the Bunts according to historian Bhaskar Anand Saletore. Some ruling and feudal clans of North Kerala adjacent to Tulu Nadu were also likely descended from Bunts. Indian anthropologist Ayinapalli Aiyappan states that a powerful and warlike clan of the Bunts was called Kola Bari and the Kolathiri Raja of Kolathunadu was a descendant of this clan.

Norwegian anthropologist Harald Tambs-Lyche, states that the Bunts were warriors of the Jain kingdoms. Jainism gained a foothold in the Canara region during the rule of the Hoysala dynasty who were themselves Jains. The Hoysala Ballal kings are known to have appointed Bunts as military officers. A section of Bunts believe that they were originally Jains who later became a caste group. A legend prevalent among the Bunts states that one of the Jain kings of the Bunts abandoned Jainism and took to eating peacock meat to cure a disease. Veerendra Heggade, the hereditary administrator of the Dharmasthala Temple has also publicly spoken about the Jain origin of the Bunts. Heggade is the current head of the Pattada Pergade family of Bunt heritage which continues to practice the Jain religion.

The concept of personal landed property existed in South Canara district from at least the 12th century and also a military tenure not very different from the feudal system of Europe. The Bunts, being a martial caste, were exempt from paying land taxes. Around the 15th century, the Bunts had consolidated themselves as a land-owning feudal caste grouping. Among the Bunts existed rich landlords as well as poor labourers who were often exploited by the former. Bunt families controlled several villages and lived in a manor house. Several villages were generally united under a single Bunt chiefdom, and the chiefdoms had considerable autonomy despite being vassals to the Jain kings. The Bunt chiefs and petty princes became virtually independent after the rise of the Nayakas of Keladi. The Haleri Rajas, who were likely a cadet branch of the Nayakas of Keladi invited Bunt families to settle in Kodagu district after establishing the Kingdom of Coorg.

At the start of the 16th century, the Tuluva dynasty came to control the Vijayanagara Empire with its capital at Hampi in North Karnataka. It has been suggested by scholars Mysore Hatti Ramasharma and Mysore Hatti Gopal that the Tuluva rulers were of Bunt origin. A section of Bunts called Parivara Bunt have also traditionally claimed to be Nayaks (chieftains) of the Vijayanagara Empire.

The feudal life and society of Bunt began to disintegrate during the colonial period, leading to a period of increasing urbanisation.

== Religion ==
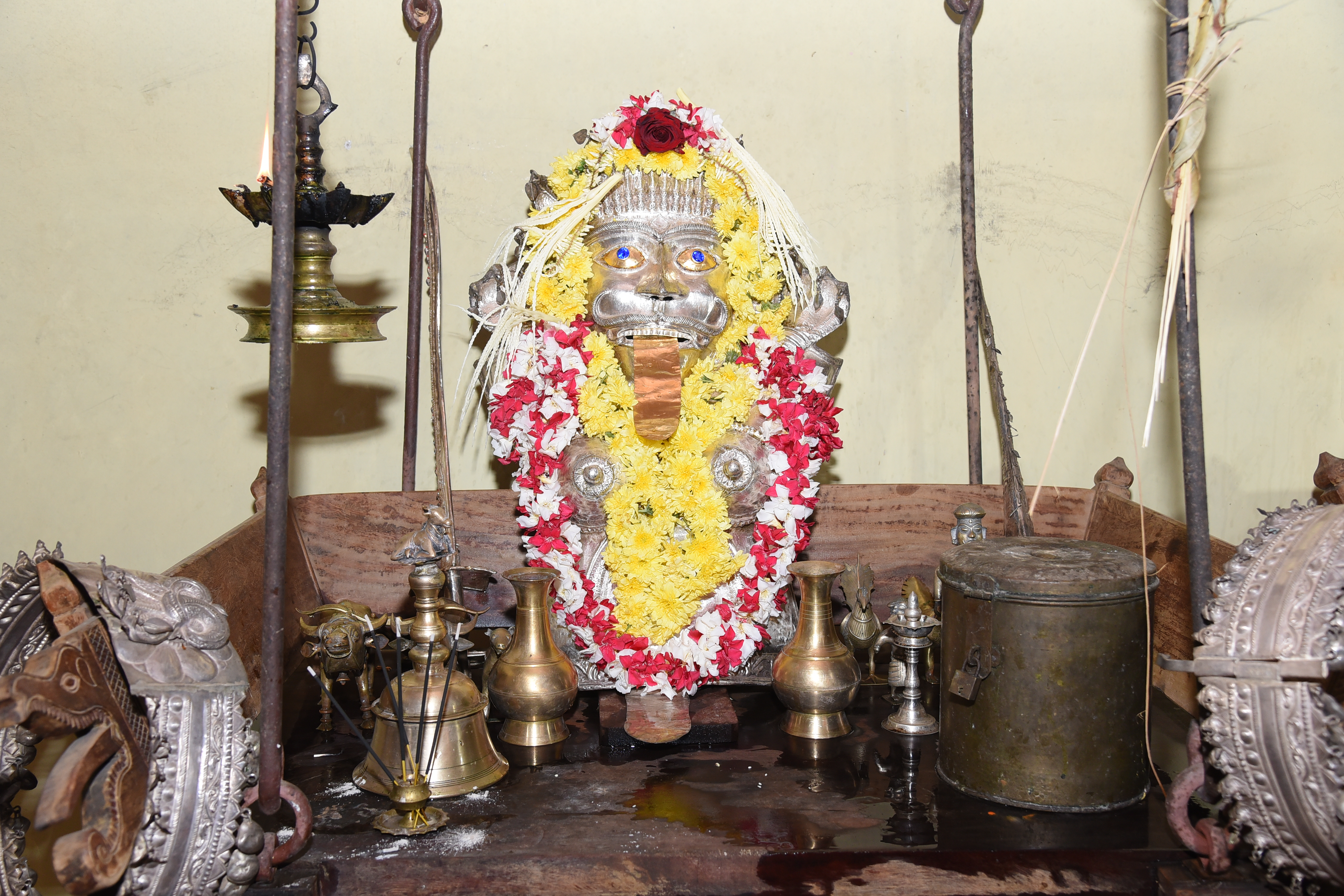
Image of the deity Jumadi at the Badagumane shrine in Belle, Udupi

The Bunts practice Hinduism as well as Jainism. Alagodi wrote in 2006 of the Tulu Nadu population that, "Among the Hindus, a little over ten per cent are brahmins, and all the others, though nominally Hindus, are really propitiators or worshippers of tutelary deities and bhutas." Amitav Ghosh describes the Tulu Butas as protective figures, ancestral spirits and heroes who have been assimilated to the ranks of minor deities. The cult worship of the Butas is widely practiced in Tulu Nadu by a large section of the population. The Bunts being the principal landowners of the region were the traditional patrons of the Buta Kola festival which included aspects akin to theatrical forms like Yakshagana.

Butas and daivas (tutelary deities) are not worshiped on a daily basis like mainstream Hindu gods. Their worship is restricted to annual ritual festivals, though daily pujas may be conducted for the ritual objects, ornaments, and other paraphernalia of the būta. Unlike with the better-known Hindu gods of the puraṇic variety, buta worship is congregational and every caste in the Tulu speaking region has its own set of butas and daivas that they worship.

Depending on the significance of the people who worship them, butas or daivas can be family deities (kuṭuṃbada buta), local or village deities (jageda buta, urada buta), or deities associated with administrative units such as manorial estates (Guțțus, e.g., Adve Moodra Guthu, Andemaar Guthu, Kinnimajal Guthu, Kudal Guthu.) (Beedus, e.g., Malarbeedu, Kuloor Beedu). groups of estates (Magane, e.g., Aila Magane uppala, districts (sime) or even small kingdoms (royal butas or rajandaivas). The deity Jumadi is cited as an example of a Rajandaiva, i.e. a royal deity who reigns over a former small kingdom or large feudal estate. Jumadi is worshiped mainly by the rich land-owning Bunts who are the chief patrons of his cult. In the myth, as well as in the religious Buta Kola dance, Jumadi is always accompanied by his warrior attendant, called Bante, who appears to be specially related to the patrons of the Bunt caste. Kodamanthaye, Kukkinanthaye, Jaranthaye, Ullaya and Ullalthi are some of the other deities from the royal Buta cult.

== Manor houses ==
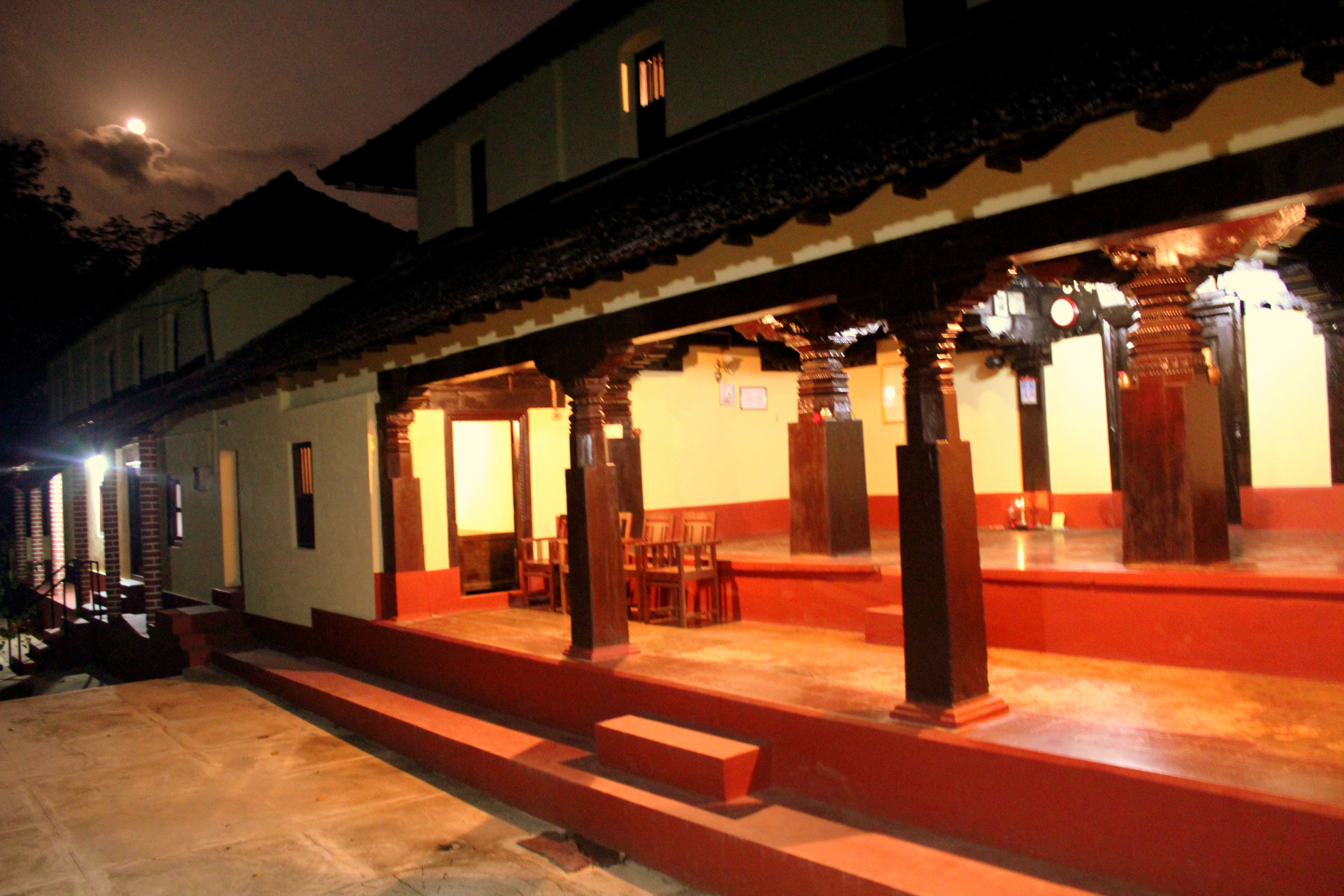
Kowdoor Nayarabettu: A medieval Bunt manor house.

Most Bunts followed a matrilineal system of inheritance and the eldest male member in the female line was the head of the family. This head of the family was called Yajmane and he would preside over the manorial court during the feudal era.

The Nadibettu Aramane house in Shirva was built in the 14th century and has copper plate inscriptions of the Vijayanagara Empire Chavadi Aramane of Nandalike, the manorial house of the Heggade chieftaincy has inscriptions from the 16th century. Suralu Aramane of the Tolaha dynasty is another house of chieftains in Udupi district; it dates from the 15th century. The Suralu Mud Palace is currently under the ownership of Sudarshan Shetty, a descendant of the Tolahas who is leading a restoration project. The Suralu Palace is a State protected Monument which was partially restored in 2016 with help from the Government of Karnataka.

Some other houses of the Bunts that preserve medieval architecture include the Kodial Guthu house of Mangalore. Badila Guthu in Kannur, Shetty Bettu, Puthige Guthu, Markada Guthu and Kodethur Guthu.

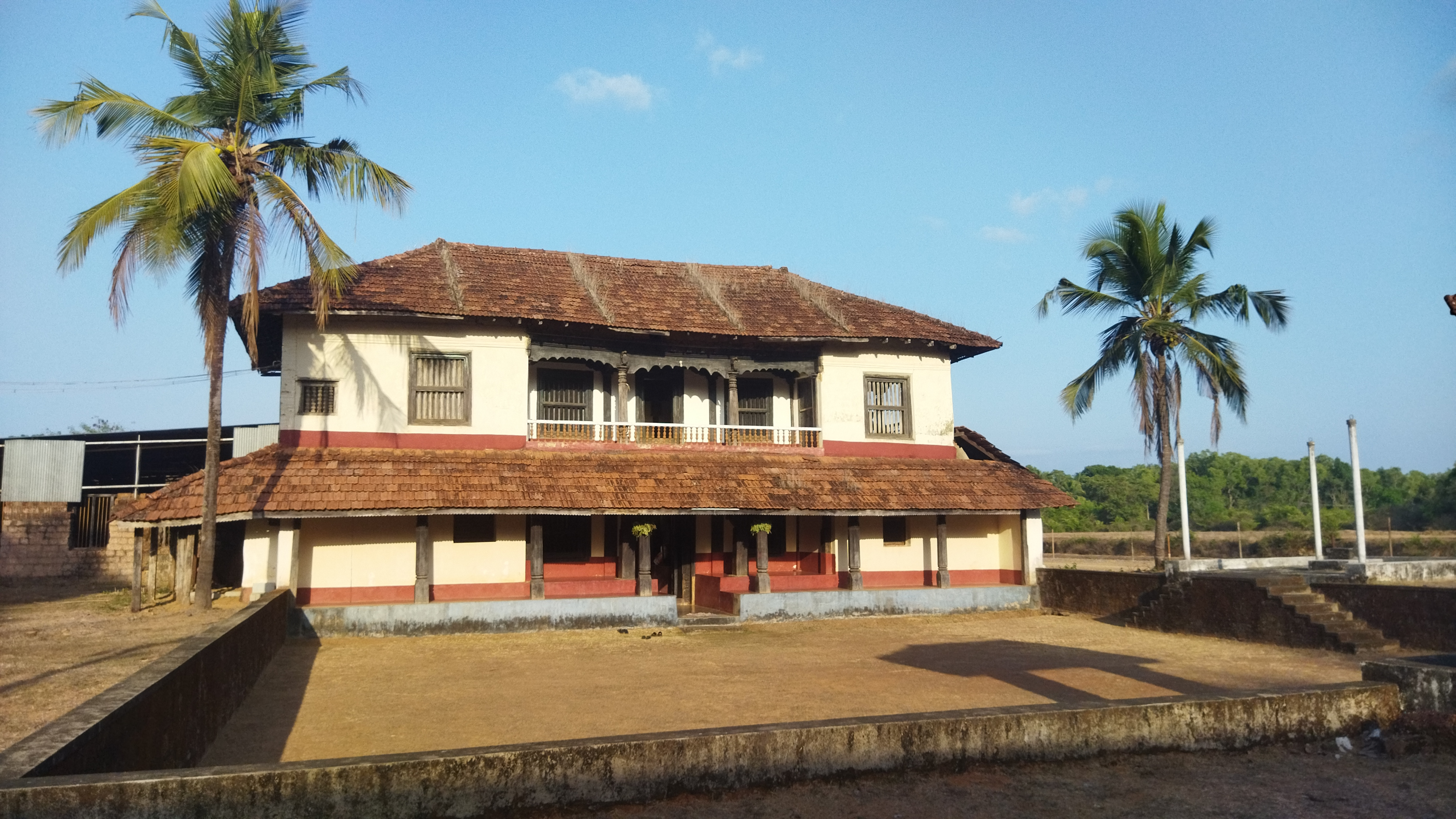
Suralu Mud Palace

== Organisation ==
The traditional community council of the Bunts have been replaced by a body of elected members called the Buntara Yane Nadavara Mathr Sangha (Bunt and Nadava Association). It was established in 1908 in Mangalore and has been called the apex body of the Bunt community by The Hindu newspaper. Similar regional and international organisations operate in areas where the Bunts have migrated.

The Bunt association, including its regional bodies, also runs schools, colleges, hostels and dispensaries.

== Varna classification ==
The traditional chaturvarna system is largely not found in South India. According to Buchanan and historians like P.N Chopra, Gundimeda Sambaiah and Sanjay Subrahmanyam etc., Bunts belong to the Sat-Shudras or "Upper" Shudras category in the Hindu varna system. In Southern India, the upper Shudras were generally the landholding ruling classes of South India and were analogous to Kshatriyas and Vaishyas in North India. According to Dr. D. N. Yogeeswarappa, Bunts are Nagavanshi kshatriyas.

Bunts today are considered a forward upper caste community.

== Reservation status ==
Bunts are categorized as Other Backward Class (OBC) in the state of Karnataka (not be confused with central list of OBC's)

They are not included in the Central List of OBCs of the state of Karnataka. However their central status is contested as legal petitions have allowed members of the Bunt community to avail OBC reservation at the national level as 'Nadavas'.

== See also ==
- Tulu people
- List of Bunts
- Kolathiri
- Alupa dynasty
