= 2013–14 I liga =

I liga
- Season: 2013–14
- Champions: GKS Bełchatów
- Promoted: GKS Bełchatów; Górnik Łęczna
- Relegated: Kolejarz Stróże; Puszcza Niepołomice; Energetyk ROW Rybnik; Okocimski KS Brzesko
- Matches played: 306
- Goals scored: 714 (2.33 per match)
- Top goalscorer: Dariusz Zjawiński (21 goals)
- Biggest home win: Bełchatów 5–0 Katowice
- Biggest away win: Okocimski 0–6 Ząbki
- Highest scoring: Puszcza 2–5 Arka
- Highest attendance: 6,634; Arka 2–1 Wisła (14 March 2014)
- Lowest attendance: 150; Puszcza 1–2 Chojnice (2 August 2013)
- Average attendance: 1,611 ▼20.5%

The 2013–14 I liga was the sixth season of the Polish I liga under its current title, and the sixty-sixth season of the second highest division in the Polish football league system. The season began on 27 July 2013 and concluded on 7 June 2014.

According to the competition rules, all clubs are required to field at least one youth player (born on 1993 or later and Polish or trained in Poland) in every game (except for the times when the only youth player on the roster is sent off or unable to continue playing).

== Changes from last season ==
The following teams have changed division since the 2012-13 season.

=== To I liga ===
Promoted from II liga East

- Puszcza Niepołomice
- Wisła Płock

Promoted from II liga West

- Chojniczanka Chojnice
- Energetyk ROW Rybnik

Relegated from Ekstraklasa

- GKS Bełchatów

=== From I liga ===
Relegated to II liga West

- Polonia Bytom
- Warta Poznań

Demoted

- ŁKS Łódź

Promoted to Ekstraklasa

- KS Cracovia
- Zawisza Bydgoszcz

=== Notes ===
- ŁKS Łódź were demoted from 2012–13 I liga as they withdrew from the competition after playing 20 out of 34 games. A successor club AP ŁKS Łódź competes in 2013–14 Łódź IV liga.
- Before the start of the season GKS Bogdanka returned to their former name Górnik Łęczna.

== Teams ==
Of the 18 participating teams, 13 remain following the 2012–13 I liga. They are joined by four teams promoted from the 2012–13 II liga and one relegated from the 2012–13 Ekstraklasa.

On 8 June 2013, Puszcza and Wisła Płock were promoted to the I liga from the eastern group of II liga after Pelikan Łowicz's 2–1 loss to Stal Rzeszów. A day later, Energetyk ROW and Chojniczanka joined them as champions and runners-up of II liga West following Bytovia's 4–0 loss to MKS Kluczbork.

On 28 May 2013 the PZPN announced their final decision that highly indebted Polonia Warsaw will be demoted from Ekstraklasa. Had they improved their financial situation, Polonia would be eligible to play in 2013–14 I liga. However, the club again failed to meet the Polish FA's financial criteria and will play in the North Mazovia IV liga. As a result, the 15th placed teams of the 2012–13 Ekstraklasa (Ruch Chorzów) and the 2012–13 I liga (Okocimski KS Brzesko) avoided relegation.

On 2 June 2013, GKS Bełchatów were relegated from the Ekstraklasa despite winning the final game against Piast Gliwice, as the other relegation threatened team Podbeskidzie Bielsko-Biała defeated Widzew Łódź 2–1.

== Team overview ==
Location of teams and stadiums in 2013–14 I liga

=== Stadia and locations ===
Team	Stadium	Capacity
Arka Gdynia	Stadion GOSiR	15,139
Chojniczanka Chojnice	Stadion Miejski Chojniczanka 1930	3,500
Dolcan Ząbki	Stadion Dolcanu	2,100
Energetyk ROW Rybnik	Stadion MOSiR	10,340
Flota Świnoujście	Stadion OSiR Wyspiarz	4,500
GKS Bełchatów	GIEKSA Arena	5,238
GKS Katowice	Stadion GKS Katowice	9,511
GKS Tychy	Stadion Miejski w Jaworznie	7,000
Górnik Łęczna	Stadion Górnika Łęczna	7,200
Kolejarz Stróże	Stadion Kolejarza Stróże	2,000
Miedź Legnica	Stadion im. Orła Białego	6,244
Okocimski KS Brzesko	Stadion Okocimskiego KS^{1}	3,000
Olimpia Grudziądz	Stadion im. Bronisława Malinowskiego	5,250
Puszcza Niepołomice	Stadion Puszczy^{2}	1,000
Sandecja Nowy Sącz	Stadion im. Ojca W. Augustynka	5,000
Stomil Olsztyn	Stadion OSiR^{3}	16,800
Nieciecza	Stadion Bruk-Bet	2,093
Wisła Płock	Stadion im. Kazimierza Górskiego	12,800

1. Okocimski played 1 home game at Stadion Suche Stawy (cap. 7,000) in Kraków.
2. Puszcza played 1 home game at Stadion Suche Stawy (cap. 7,000) in Kraków.
3. Stomil played 1 home game at Stadion OSiR (cap. 4,998) in Ostróda.

=== Personnel and sponsoring ===
As of 15 May 2014.

Team	Manager	Chairman	Team captain	Kit Manufacturer	Sponsor
Arka Gdynia	(Poland) Piotr Rzepka	(Poland) Wojciech Petrkiewicz	(Poland) Tomasz Jarzębowski	Adidas	Polnord, Gdynia OSiR
Chojniczanka Chojnice	(Poland) Mariusz Pawlak	(Poland) Maciej Polasik	(Poland) Paweł Iwanicki	Adidas	Skiba, Ginter, Eurostandard, Wodnik
Dolcan Ząbki	(Poland) Robert Podoliński	(Poland) Jerzy Szczęsny	(Poland) Piotr Klepczarek	Adidas	Dolcan, Ząbki
Energetyk ROW Rybnik	(Poland) Jan Furlepa	(Poland) Grzegorz Janik	(Poland) Kamil Kostecki	Adidas	Rybnik
Flota Świnoujście	(Poland) Tomasz Kafarski	(Poland) Edward Rozwałka	(Poland) Marek Niewiada	Jako	Leszek Zakrzewski, Świnoujście
GKS Bełchatów	(Poland) Kamil Kiereś	(Poland) Marcin Szymczyk	(Poland) Maciej Wilusz	Adidas	Polska Grupa Energetyczna
GKS Katowice	(Poland) Kazimierz Moskal	(Poland) Wojciech Cygan	(Poland) Przemysław Pitry	Macron	Katowice
GKS Tychy	(Poland) Jan Żurek	(Poland) Alina Sowa	(Poland) Łukasz Kopczyk	Nike	Tyskie, Tyski Sport
Górnik Łęczna	(Ukraine) Yuriy Shatalov	(Poland) Artur Kapelko	(Serbia) Veljko Nikitović	Jako	Bogdanka Coal Mine
Kolejarz Stróże	(Poland) Przemysław Cecherz	(Poland) Bolesław Dywan	(Poland) Dariusz Walęciak	Nike	Cargosped, Fonmix
Miedź Legnica	(Poland) Dariusz Żuraw	(Poland) Martyna Pajączek	(Poland) Jakub Grzegorzewski	Adidas	DSA
Okocimski KS Brzesko	(Poland) Robert Orłowski (Poland) Krzysztof Przytuła	(Poland) Roman Pawełek	(Poland) Radosław Jacek	Select	Okocim, Can-Pack S.A., Blach Stal
Olimpia Grudziądz	(Poland) Dariusz Kubicki	(Poland) Jacek Bojarowski	(Poland) Dariusz Kłus	Nike	TBD
Puszcza Niepołomice	(Poland) Dariusz Wójtowicz	(Poland) Jarosław Pieprzyca	(Poland) Łukasz Nowak	Nike	Niepołomice
Sandecja Nowy Sącz	(Poland) Ryszard Kuźma	(Poland) Andrzej Danek	(Poland) Paweł Nowak	Adidas	Wiśniowski, Fakro
Stomil Olsztyn	(Poland) Adam Łopatko	(Poland) Jacek Czałpiński	(Poland) Janusz Bucholc	RG Teamwear	Galeria Warmińska, Arbet, Olsztyn
Termalica Bruk-Bet Nieciecza KS	(Poland) Piotr Mandrysz	(Poland) Danuta Witkowska	(Poland) Karol Piątek	Nike	Termalica, Georyt
Wisła Płock	(Poland) Marcin Kaczmarek	(Poland) Jacek Kruszewski	(Poland) Łukasz Nadolski	Zina	Płock

== League table ==
Pos	Team	Pld	W	D	L	GF	GA	GD	Pts	Promotion or relegation
1	GKS Bełchatów (P)	34	18	9	7	50	27	+23	63	Promotion to Ekstraklasa
2	Górnik Łęczna (P)	34	17	10	7	45	27	+18	61	Promotion to Ekstraklasa
3	Dolcan Ząbki	34	15	10	9	60	39	+21	55	
4	Arka Gdynia	34	15	9	10	53	40	+13	54	
5	Nieciecza	34	14	11	9	42	33	+9	53 (Note: NIE - GRU 2:0; GRU - NIE 2:2)	
6	Olimpia Grudziądz	34	16	5	13	38	39	−1	53	
7	Wisła Płock	34	14	10	10	37	33	+4	52	
8	GKS Katowice	34	11	13	10	44	45	−1	46	
9	Sandecja Nowy Sącz	34	11	11	12	29	40	−11	44 (Note: SNS: 6 pts, 3-2; MLE: 5 pts, 4-3; KOL: 4 pts, 1-3)	
10	Miedź Legnica	34	11	11	12	42	37	+5	44	
11	Kolejarz Stróże (Note: Kolejarz Stróże did not receive the license for the 2014–15 season. As a result the 15th-placed Stomil Olsztyn stayed in I liga for the next season.) (R)	34	12	8	14	36	38	−2	44	Club dissolved after season
12	Flota Świnoujście	34	10	12	12	29	34	−5	42	
13	GKS Tychy	34	10	11	13	39	48	−9	41 (Note: TYC: 6 pts, 5-4; CCH: 5 pts, 5-4; STO: 4 pts, 2-4)	
14	Chojniczanka Chojnice	34	9	14	11	35	33	+2	41	
15	Stomil Olsztyn	34	10	11	13	38	42	−4	41	
16	Puszcza Niepołomice (R)	34	8	9	17	37	56	−19	33 (Note: ROW - PNI 0:1; PNI - ROW 1:1)	Relegation to II liga
17	Energetyk ROW Rybnik (R)	34	6	15	13	42	52	−10	33	Relegation to II liga
18	Okocimski KS Brzesko (R)	34	4	11	19	18	51	−33	23	Relegation to II liga

Source: 90minut.pl
Rules for classification: 1) points; 2) head-to-head points; 3) head-to-head goal difference; 4) head-to-head goals scored; 5) goal difference; 6) number of goals scored.
(P) Promoted; (R) Relegated

== Results ==
Home \ Away	ARK	CCH	DOL	ROW	FLO	BEŁ	KAT	TYC	GKŁ	KOL	MLE	OKO	GRU	PNI	SNS	STO	NIE	WPK
Arka Gdynia		3–2	0–2	0–2	3–0	1–1	3–0	3–0	2–1	3–1	0–0	1–2	1–1	3–2	0–0	3–3	1–2	2–1
Chojniczanka Chojnice	0–1		0–0	1–1	2–1	0–1	1–1	2–2	0–0	3–1	1–1	2–0	1–1	0–2	1–0	0–1	0–1	2–0
Dolcan Ząbki	1–0	0–0		0–2	2–1	2–1	0–0	4–0	2–2	1–1	1–4	3–2	2–1	4–2	2–0	4–2	2–1	3–1
Energetyk ROW Rybnik	2–2	1–4	2–2		1–1	2–0	0–4	1–1	1–0	1–2	0–3	3–0	1–2	0–1	2–3	0–2	2–3	2–2
Flota Świnoujście	0–1	2–0	2–1	1–1		1–1	1–0	0–1	1–1	0–2	1–0	2–0	0–0	0–1	1–1	0–0	0–0	2–0
GKS Bełchatów	0–1	1–1	1–0	2–2	3–0		5–0	3–1	1–1	0–0	2–1	1–1	2–1	1–0	4–0	1–0	1–1	0–2
GKS Katowice	2–0	2–1	3–1	2–1	1–1	2–2		3–3	1–1	2–2	1–0	0–1	4–0	1–1	2–0	2–1	1–1	1–0
GKS Tychy	0–1	1–1	1–1	2–2	2–3	1–3	3–1		2–0	0–3	3–1	2–0	0–1	5–1	2–0	1–0	0–3	1–0
Górnik Łęczna	1–1	2–0	1–1	1–2	0–0	0–2	3–0	2–0		2–0	2–0	2–2	2–1	2–0	3–0	3–0	1–1	0–2
Kolejarz Stróże	3–2	1–1	2–1	1–1	1–3	0–1	0–0	1–0	0–1		1–0	2–0	0–1	2–3	0–0	1–0	1–1	2–0
Miedź Legnica	2–1	2–2	0–3	1–1	1–2	0–2	3–0	0–0	1–2	2–0		0–0	1–0	3–0	2–2	1–1	2–0	0–0
Okocimski KS Brzesko	0–0	1–0	0–6	0–0	1–1	0–1	1–1	0–0	1–2	1–3	0–1		0–2	1–1	0–0	0–1	0–0	1–2
Olimpia Grudziądz	1–3	1–0	0–5	2–1	2–0	0–2	1–0	3–1	0–1	1–0	0–2	3–1		3–1	3–1	3–0	2–2	0–0
Puszcza Niepołomice	2–5	1–2	2–1	1–1	0–1	0–2	2–2	1–1	1–2	1–2	1–4	4–0	1–0		0–1	0–0	2–0	0–3
Sandecja Nowy Sącz	0–3	1–1	1–0	1–0	0–0	2–0	1–0	0–1	1–2	1–0	0–0	0–2	2–0	2–2		1–0	2–1	2–2
Stomil Olsztyn	0–0	0–2	1–1	1–1	3–1	2–3	3–1	1–1	1–0	2–1	4–2	2–0	0–1	1–1	1–1		2–0	1–2
Nieciecza	4–2	0–0	1–0	2–2	1–0	1–0	1–3	2–0	0–1	2–0	2–0	2–0	2–0	0–0	1–3	3–1		0–1
Wisła Płock	2–1	0–2	2–2	2–1	1–0	1–0	1–1	1–1	0–1	1–0	2–2	1–0	0–1	1–0	2–0	1–1	1–1	

Source: 90minut.pl
Legend: Blue = home team win; Yellow = draw; Red = away team win.

== Season statistics ==
=== Top goalscorers ===
As of matches played 7 June 2014.

Rank	Player	Club	Goals
1	(Poland) Dariusz Zjawiński	Dolcan Ząbki	21
2	(Poland) Michał Mak	GKS Bełchatów	15
3	(Poland) Grzegorz Piesio	Dolcan Ząbki	13
4	(Poland) Arkadiusz Aleksander	Arka Gdynia	12
5	(Senegal) Idrissa Cissé	Energetyk ROW Rybnik	11
5	(Poland) Daniel Feruga	Energetyk ROW Rybnik	11
5	(Poland) Łukasz Nowak	Puszcza Niepołomice	11
5	(Poland) Paweł Smółka	GKS Tychy	11
