= Baliga =

Baliga is a Konkani Brahmin surname from Goa, coastal Karnataka and parts of Maharashtra, India. It is found among Hindus of the Goud Saraswat Brahmin community.

== History ==
The Baliga surname is used by families of the Goud Saraswat Brahmin community. Baliga is the written form of the surname, but in spoken language it is used as Bale or Ballo.

In 1637, at the flourishing rice port of Basrur (Barcelore in Portuguese Records) on the Canara Coast, a group of merchants expressed their unhappiness over the atrocities by local Portuguese officials to the Portuguese Viceroy of Goa, through a letter. The letter also said that if the problems continued they will leave the port city with their money. This letter was signed by Narayan Ballo, Shiv Ballo and Damo Ballo among other Saraswats and Jain merchants.

The other notable mention is in The Ancient History of South Canara written by Ganapathi Rao Aigal, which mentions one Damarsa Bale, among nine other Samasthas (Noblemen) of Bantwal, signing a copper inscription of offering to Sri Bhadra Narasimha Temple of Manjeshwar. This inscription was created in the year 1747 A.D.

Today, there are families in Goa who use the surname Bale and their Gotra and Kuldev match that of the Manjeshwar Baligas. Since the actual form of the surname Baliga in usage in Konkani language is Bale or Ballo.

Some historians claim that foot soldiers wielding spears and weapon design were called Balle (Ballo for singular, Balle for plural). The soldier Ballo (Baliga) was under the command of the Nayak (Chieftain). The daily requirements of every family for survival, presentations, etc., were the responsibility of the Ballo.

The faction of the Baligas that reside in current day Bantwal, called Bantwal Baligas, are said by some to have hailed from the Hegde family. Incidentally, the Hegde family also bears the same Gotra (Kashyap) and Kuldevata (Aryadurga-Damodar).

== Notable people ==
The following is a list of notable people with last name Baliga:

- A. V. Baliga FRCS (1904–1964), a physician and an educationist
- B. Jayant Baliga, Indian electrical engineer
- Bantwal Vaikunta Baliga (1895–1968), lawyer
- R. K. Baliga (1929–1988), known as the father of Electronics City, Bangalore
- Ragavendra R. Baliga, Professor of Medicine
- Sujatha Baliga (born 1970/1971), American attorney and restorative justice practitioner
- Tomasz Baliga (born 1988), Polish footballer
