= Aigal =

Aigal may refer to:

- Aigal, Iran
- Ganapathi Rao Aigal (1881–1944), Indian educator and historian
