= List of Legia Warsaw seasons =

This is a list of the seasons played by Legia Warsaw from 1906 when the club first entered a league competition to the most recent seasons. The club's achievements in all major national and international competitions as well as the top scorers are listed. Top scorers in bold were also top scorers of Ekstraklasa. The list is separated into three parts, coinciding with the three major episodes of Polish football:

- 1927-1939 → the Polish league structure was changing rapidly. The end of World War II marks the end of this episode.
- 1948–63 → the Polish league structure without a nationwide league was maintained without greater changes.
- Since 1962-1963 → the nationwide league exists.

Legia have won the national championship 15 times, which makes them the most successful club in the Ekstraklasa. The club also won the Polish Cup 18 times, making them the record holder in number of cups won. Legia is the only Polish club never to have been relegated from the top flight of Polish football after World War II.

== Key ==
- Rank = Final position
- P = Played
- W = Games won
- D = Games drawn
- L = Games lost
- F = Goals for
- A = Goals against
- GD = Goal difference
- Pts = Points
- Avg.Att. = Average attendance at home
- PFC = Polish football championship
- Cup = Polish Cup
- Europe = European competition entered
- Res. = Result in that competition
- — = Not attended
- NQ = Qualification stage
- 1R = Round 1
- 2R = Round 2
- 3R = Round 3
- 4R = Round 4
- 5R = Round 5
- R32 = Round of 32
- R16 = Round of 16
- Group = Group stage
- QF = Quarter-finals
- SF = Semi-finals
- RU = Runners-Up
- W = Champions

Champions *	Runners-up ¤	Promoted ↑	Relegated ↓	Reached next stage of competition ∆

== 1927-1939 ==
Season	Division	P	W	D	L	F	A	GD	Pts	Rank	PFC
1927	Liga	26	12	3	11	60	75	7	27	5	—
1928	Liga	28	17	2	9	30	77	43	36	3	—
1929	Liga	24	12	6	6	44	34	10	30	4	—
1930	Liga	22				67	27	40	30	3	—
1931	Liga	22				57	34	23	29	3	—
1932	Liga	22				37	25	12	23	5	—
1933	Liga	20				39	39	(9)	16	6	—
1934	Liga	22				37	30	7	24	5	—
1935	Liga	22				32	46	(14)	18	9	—
1936	Liga	18				24	46	(24)	8	10 ↓	—
1937	Klasa A									5	—
1938	Liga okręgowa									3	—

== 1948–63 ==
Season	League										Polish Cup	Europe		Avg. Attendance	Top goalscorer(s)		Ref.
Season	Division	P	W	D	L	F	A	GD	Pts	Rank	Polish Cup	Cup	Res.	Avg. Attendance	Player	Goals	Ref.
1948	I Liga	26	14	2	10	55	46	9	30	4					Kazimierz Górski Aleksander Szymański	11	
1949	I Liga	22	7	5	10	37	43	(6)	19	9							
1950	I Liga	22	7	4	11	38	40	(2)	18	10							
1951	I Liga	22	12	3	7	37	31	6	27	3							
1952	I Liga	10	4	2	4	24	14	10	10	3							
1953	I Liga	22	8	7	7	37	31	6	23	5							
1954	I Liga	20	7	5	8	27	29	(2)	19	7							
1955	I Liga	22	12	4	6	48	21	27	28	1							
1956	I Liga	22	15	4	3	65	17	48	34	1		European Cup	DNQ				
1957	I Liga	22	11	4	7	62	33	29	26	4					Lucjan Brychczy	19	
1958	I Liga	22	9	2	11	40	40	0	20	6							
1959	I Liga	22	8	9	5	31	29	2	25	4							
1960	I Liga	22	12	5	5	40	26	14	29	2		European Cup	DNQ				
1961	I Liga	26	13	6	7	51	35	16	32	3							
1962	I Liga	14	6	5	3	20	15	5	14	5							

== Since 1962-63 ==
Season	League										Polish Cup	Europe		Avg. Att.	Top goalscorer(s)	
Season	Division	P	W	D	L	F	A	GD	Pts	Rank	Polish Cup	Europe	Res.	Avg. Att.	Player	Goals
1962–63	I Liga	26	7	11	8	29	25	4	25	7	R16	—	—			
1963–64	I Liga	26	13	5	8	44	36	8	31	4	W	—	—		(Poland) **Lucjan Brychczy**	**18**
1964–65	I Liga	26	9	8	9	30	28	2	26	6	SF	UEFA Cup Winners' Cup	QF		(Poland) **Lucjan Brychczy**	**20**
1965–66	I Liga	26	13	5	8	44	36	8	31	4	W	-	-			
1966–67	I Liga	26	9	7	10	35	22	13	28	4	R16	-	-			
1967–68	I Liga	26	13	9	4	36	15	21	35	2 ¤	R16	-	-			
1968–69	I Liga	26	16	7	3	51	16	35	39	1*	RU	Inter-Cities Fairs Cup	3R		-	-
1969–70	I Liga	26	17	6	3	43	17	26	40	1*	SF	European Cup	SF		(Poland) Robert Gadocha	15
1970–71	I Liga	26	14	6	6	39	20	19	34	2 ¤	QF	European Cup	QF		-	-
1971–72	I Liga	26	12	8	6	36	20	16	32	3	RU	UEFA Cup	2R		-	-
1972–73	I Liga	26	6	11	9	29	28	1	26	8	W	European Cup Winners' Cup	2R		-	-
1973–74	I Liga	30	12	10	8	38	28	10	34	4	QF	European Cup Winners' Cup	1R		-	-
1974–75	I Liga	30	9	11	10	45	35	10	29	6	R32	-	-		-	-
1975–76	I Liga	30	12	5	13	44	46	(2)	29	8	R16	-	-		-	-
1976–77	I Liga	30	12	6	12	40	38	2	30	8	SF	-	-		-	-
1977–78	I Liga	30	12	7	11	44	34	10	31	5	SF	-	-		-	-
1978–79	I Liga	30	10	13	7	32	28	4	33	6	R16	-	-		-	-
1979–80	I Liga	30	14	8	8	38	31	7	36	3	W	-	-		(Poland) **Krzysztof Adamczyk**	**18**
1980–81	I Liga	30	12	12	6	48	29	19	36	5	W	European Cup Winners' Cup	1R		-	-
1981–82	I Liga	30	11	13	6	39	29	10	35	4	R16	European Cup Winners' Cup	QF		-	-
1982–83	I Liga	30	11	7	12	43	39	4	29	8	QF	-	-		-	-
1983–84	I Liga	30	12	9	9	42	32	10	33	5	5R	-	-		-	-
1984–85	I Liga	30	17	7	6	36	19	17	41	2 ¤	QF	-	-		-	-
1985–86	I Liga	30	17	8	5	55	29	26	42	2 ¤	QF	UEFA Cup	3R		-	-
1986–87	I Liga	30	12	14	4	44	28	16	38	5	5R	UEFA Cup	2R		-	-
1987–88	I Liga	30	15	8	7	39	27	12	39	3	RU	-	-		(Poland) **Dariusz Dziekanowski**	**20**
1988–89	I Liga	30	14	9	7	41	19	22	43	4	W	UEFA Cup	1R		-	-
1989–90	I Liga	30	10	16	4	27	18	9	35	7	W	European Cup Winners' Cup	1R		-	-
1990–91	I Liga	30	8	12	10	24	24	0	28	9	RU	European Cup Winners' Cup	SF		-	-
1991–92	I Liga	34	11	11	12	34	33	1	33	10	5R	-	-		-	-
1992–93	I Liga	34	21	7	6	56	26	30	47	2 ¤	SF	-	-		-	-
1993–94	I Liga	34	19	13	2	72	24	48	48	1*	W	-	-		(Poland) Wojciech Kowalczyk	18
1994–95	I Liga	34	23	5	6	58	20	38	51	1*	W	UEFA Champions League	NQ		(Poland) Jerzy Podbrożny	21
1995–96	I Liga	34	27	4	3	95	22	73	85	2 ¤	4R	UEFA Champions League	QF		(Poland) Jerzy Podbrożny	21
1996–97	I Liga	34	24	5	5	66	27	39	77	2 ¤	W	UEFA Cup	2R		(Poland) Cezary Kucharski	23
1997–98	I Liga	34	16	11	7	50	32	18	59	5	5R	UEFA Cup Winners' Cup	1R		(Poland) **Sylwester Czereszewski**	**14**
1998–99	I Liga	30	16	8	6	41	25	16	56	3	5R	-	-		(Poland) Bartosz Karwan	12
1999–2000	I Liga	30	14	10	6	53	34	19	52	4	5R	-	-		(Poland) Sylwester Czereszewski	16
2000–01	I Liga	30	14	8	8	45	29	16	50	3	QF	-	-		(Poland) Marcin Mieciel	13
2001–02	I Liga	28	15	10	3	50	24	26	69	1*	QF	UEFA Cup	2R		(Poland) Cezary Kucharski	13
2002–03	I Liga	30	17	9	4	61	29	32	60	4	3R	UEFA Champions League; UEFA Cup	NQ; 2R		(Federal Republic of Yugoslavia) **Stanko Svitlica**	**24**
2003–04	I Liga	30	18	6	2	56	19	37	60	2 ¤	RU	-	-		(Poland) Marek Saganowski	17
2004–05	I Liga	30	13	8	5	42	19	23	47	3	SF	UEFA Cup	1R		(Poland) Piotr Włodarczyk	9
2005–06	I Liga	30	20	6	4	47	17	30	66	1*	QF	UEFA Cup	NQ		(Poland) Piotr Włodarczyk	10
2006–07	I Liga	30	16	4	10	53	33	20	52	3	SF	UEFA Champions League; UEFA Cup	NQ; 1R		(Poland) Piotr Włodarczyk	10
2007–08	I Liga	30	20	3	7	48	17	31	63	2 ¤	SF	UEFA Intertoto Cup	2R		(Zimbabwe) Takesure Chinyama	15
2008–09	Ekstraklasa	30	18	7	5	52	17	35	61	2 ¤	SF	UEFA Cup	NQ		(Zimbabwe) **Takesure Chinyama**	**19**
2009–10	Ekstraklasa	30	15	7	8	36	22	14	52	4	QF	UEFA Europa League	NQ		(Poland) Bartłomiej Grzelak (Poland) Maciej Iwański	6
2010–11	Ekstraklasa	30	15	4	11	45	38	7	49	3	W	—	—		(Serbia) Miroslav Radović	10
2011–12	Ekstraklasa	30	15	8	7	42	17	25	53	3	W	UEFA Europa League	R32		(Serbia) Danijel Ljuboja	11
2012–13	Ekstraklasa	30	20	7	3	59	22	37	67	1*	W	UEFA Europa League	NQ	17,700	(Serbia) Danijel Ljuboja	12
2013–14	Ekstraklasa	37	26	3	8	75	34	41	50	1*	R16	UEFA Europa League	Group	19,000	(Serbia) Miroslav Radovic	14
2014–15	Ekstraklasa	37	21	7	9	64	33	31	42	2 ¤	W	UEFA Europa League	R32	16,600	(Portugal) Orlando Sá	13
2015–16	Ekstraklasa	37	21	10	6	70	32	38	43	1*	W	UEFA Europa League	Group	21,213	(Hungary) **Nemanja Nikolić**	**28**
2016–17	Ekstraklasa	37	21	10	6	70	31	49	44	1*	R32	UEFA Champions League; UEFA Europa League	Group; R32	20,455	(Hungary) Nemanja Nikolić	12
2017–18	Ekstraklasa	37	22	4	11	54	35	19	70	1*	W	UEFA Champions League; UEFA Europa League	NQ; NQ	17,334	(Poland) Jarosław Niezgoda	13
2018–19	Ekstraklasa	37	20	8	9	55	38	17	68	2 ¤	QF	UEFA Champions League; UEFA Europa League	NQ; NQ	17,614	(Spain) Carlitos	16
2019–20	Ekstraklasa	37	21	6	10	70	35	35	69	1*	SF	UEFA Europa League	NQ	14,849	(Poland) Jarosław Niezgoda	14
2020–21	Ekstraklasa	30	19	7	4	48	24	24	64	1*	QF	UEFA Champions League; UEFA Europa League	NQ; NQ	9,163	(Czech Republic) **Tomáš Pekhart**	**22**
2021–22	Ekstraklasa	34	13	4	17	46	48	-2	43	10	SF	UEFA Champions League; UEFA Europa League	NQ; Group	14,503	(Czech Republic) Tomáš Pekhart	9
2022–23	Ekstraklasa	34	19	9	6	57	37	20	66	2 ¤	W	—	—	21,206	(Portugal) Josué Pesqueira	12
2023–24	Ekstraklasa	34	16	11	7	51	39	12	59	3	R16	UEFA Europa Conference League	KPO	24,716	(Portugal) Josué Pesqueira	9
2024–25	Ekstraklasa	34	15	9	10	60	45	15	54	5	W	UEFA Europa Conference League	QF	24,867	(Spain) Marc Gual (Poland) Bartosz Kapustka	9

== Bibliography ==
- List of Legia Warsaw in detail at the 90minut.pl
- List of Ekstraklasa top scorers at the History of Polish Football
