= Nandalike Balachandra Rao =

Indian journalist (1953–2025)

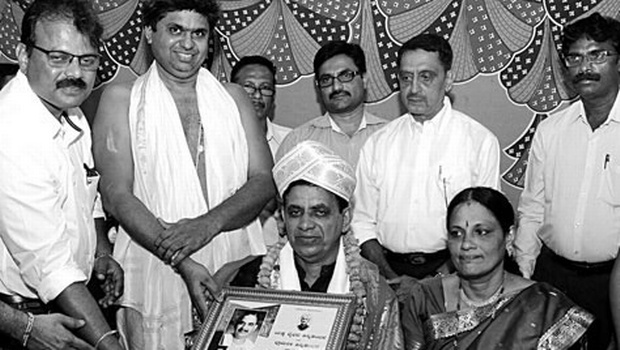
Award function

Nandalike Balachandra Rao (12 March 1953 – 14 May 2025) was an Indian journalist and writer who was the son of Nandalike Subba Rao and Girijamma.

== Life and career ==
Balachandra Rao was born on 12 March 1953. He did his B.A. at Government college, Mangalore and Diploma in public relations and journalism at Mysore University.

Former banker Nandalike Balachandra Rao, who made meaningful efforts to immortalise Kannada poet laureate Kavi Muddana’s works, was conferred the Kavi Muddanna Award. Muddana (Kannada: ಮುದ್ದಣ; 24 January 1870 – 15 February 1901) was a Kannada poet, writer and a Yakshagana poet from Nandalike.

His book "Kumara Vijaya" was released at Tulu Parba.

Balachandra Rao died on 14 May 2025, at the age of 72.

== See also ==
- Muddana
- Nandalike
