= Szymon Sawala =

Polish footballer

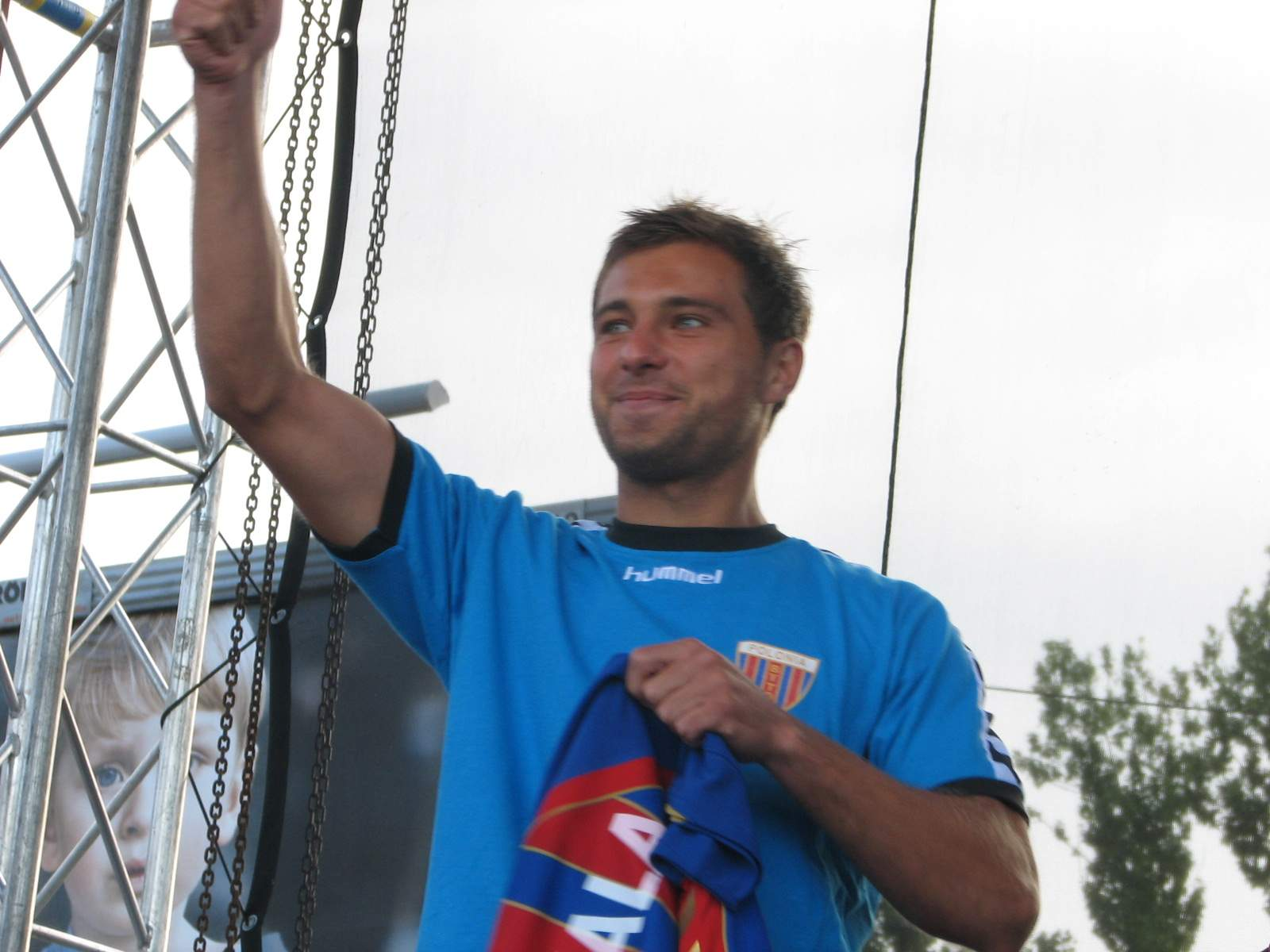
- Sawala with Polonia Bytom

Personal information
- Full name: Szymon Sawala
- Date of birth: 25 September 1982 (age 44)
- Place of birth: Sieraków, Poland
- Height: 1.84 m (6 ft 1/2 in)
- Position: Midfielder

Youth career
- Warta Międzychód

Senior career*
Years	Team	Apps	(Gls)
2000–2004	Amica Wronki	3	(0)
2004–2005	Hapoel Nazareth Illit	13	(0)
2005–2006	Drwęca Nowe Miasto Lubawskie	26	(2)
2006–2007	Vyzas Megara	31	(3)
2007–2008	Olympiacos Volos		
2008–2009	GKP Gorzów Wielkopolski	32	(3)
2009–2010	Polonia Bytom	41	(6)
2011–2015	GKS Bełchatów	86	(2)
2015–2016	Ząbkovia Ząbki	14	(0)
2016–2019	Warta Międzychód		
- * Club domestic league appearances and goals

Szymon Sawala (born 25 September 1982) is a Polish former professional footballer who played as a midfielder.

== Career ==
=== Club ===
In February 2011, he joined GKS Bełchatów on a three-and-a-half-year contract.

== Honours ==
GKS Bełchatów

- I liga: 2013–14

Warta Międzychód

- IV liga Greater Poland (North): 2015–16
