= Kamil Wacławczyk =

Polish footballer

Personal information
- Full name: Kamil Wacławczyk
- Date of birth: 29 March 1987 (age 39)
- Place of birth: Lubin, Poland
- Height: 1.78 m (5 ft 10 in)
- Position: Midfielder

Youth career
- Górnik Polkowice

Senior career*
Years	Team	Apps	(Gls)
2004–2011	Górnik Polkowice	112+	(11+)
2011–2015	GKS Bełchatów	74	(8)
2015	KS Polkowice	10	(3)
2016–2018	Bytovia Bytów	67	(4)
2018–2025	Górnik Polkowice	160	(12)
- * Club domestic league appearances and goals

Kamil Wacławczyk (born 29 March 1987) is a Polish former professional footballer who played as a midfielder.

== Honours ==
Górnik Polkowice

- II liga: 2020–21
- III liga: 2008–09 (Lower Silesia–Lubusz), 2018–19 (group III)
- Polish Cup (Legnica regionals): 2023–24

GKS Bełchatów

- I liga: 2013–14
