= Damian Byrtek =

Polish footballer

Personal information
- Full name: Damian Byrtek
- Date of birth: 7 March 1991 (age 35)
- Place of birth: Bielsko-Biała, Poland
- Height: 1.93 m (6 ft 4 in)
- Position: Centre-back

Youth career
- Olimpia Piekary Slaskie
- 2008–2009: Podbeskidzie

Senior career*
Years	Team	Apps	(Gls)
2010–2014	Podbeskidzie	16	(0)
2011	→ KSZO Ostrowiec (loan)	6	(1)
2013	→ OKS Brzesko (loan)	13	(1)
2013–2014	→ Raków Częstochowa (loan)	30	(1)
2015–2016	Chrobry Głogów	31	(2)
2016–2018	Wisła Płock	41	(3)
2018–2019	Piast Gliwice	1	(0)
2019–2020	Miedź Legnica	8	(0)
2020–2021	Stomil Olsztyn	27	(1)
2021–2023	Chojniczanka Chojnice	33	(0)
2023–2024	Legia Warsaw II	18	(0)

International career
2012	Poland U21	3	(0)
- * Club domestic league appearances and goals as of 10 June 2024

Damian Byrtek (born 7 March 1991) is a Polish professional footballer who plays as a centre-back.

== Club career ==
=== Early career ===
Before joining Podbeskidzie, Byrtek spent time with Olimpia Piekary Slaskie.

=== Podbeskidzie ===
In February 2010, he signed five-year contract with senior team of Podbeskidzie Bielsko-Biała.

=== KSZO ===
The first of Byrtek's loans was to KSZO. He was set to make his debut against Sokół Sokółka, but the match was called off. Instead, he made his debut a week later, in a 0–0 draw with Resovia.

=== Brzesko ===
In February 2013, Byrtek was loaned out to Okocimski KS Brzesko. He made his league debut on 9 March 2013 in a 1–0 loss to Cracovia.

=== Raków Częstochowa ===
In July 2013, Byrtek was loaned out to Raków Częstochowa in the II liga.

=== Chrobry Głogów ===
In January 2015, Byrtek moved to I liga club Chrobry Głogów on a free transfer.

=== Wisła Płock ===
In January 2016, Byrtek moved to Wisła Płock. The club were promoted to the Ekstraklasa in his debut season, and his top-flight debut came on 8 August 2016, in a 2–2 draw with Ruch Chorzów. He was brought on for Tomislav Božić in the 85th minute.

=== Stomil Osztyn ===
On 16 September 2020, he signed with Stomil Olsztyn.
