= Jakub Grzegorzewski =

Polish footballer

Personal information
- Date of birth: 16 April 1982 (age 44)
- Place of birth: Piotrków Trybunalski, Poland
- Height: 1.87 m (6 ft 1 1/2 in)
- Position: Forward

Senior career*
Years	Team	Apps	(Gls)
1999–2001	Concordia Piotrków Trybunalski		
2002–2004	Heko Czermno		
2004–2006	Korona Kielce	46	(13)
2006–2009	Górnik Łęczna	41	(12)
2007	→ Odra Wodzisław (loan)	25	(11)
2009–2010	Cracovia	2	(0)
2010	→ Odra Wodzisław (loan)	9	(4)
2011–2014	Miedź Legnica	90	(37)
2014	Okocimski KS Brzesko	10	(0)
2014–2015	MKS Kluczbork	25	(1)
2015	Polonia New York SC		
2016	Polonia Piotrków Trybunalski		
- * Club domestic league appearances and goals

Jakub Grzegorzewski (born 16 April 1982) is a Polish former professional footballer who played as a forward. During the 2004–05 season, he helped Korona earn promotion to Ekstraklasa.

== Honours ==
Korona Kielce

- II liga: 2004–05

Górnik Łęczna

- III liga, gr. IV: 2004–05

Miedź Legnica

- II liga West: 2011–12

MKS Kluczbork

- II liga: 2014–15
