= Nadavara =

Nadavara or Nadavaru is a caste. The word has been used in reference to two Indian castes from Karnataka.

- Bunts
- Nadavars of Uttara Kannada
