= Muddana =

Indian poet (1870–1901)

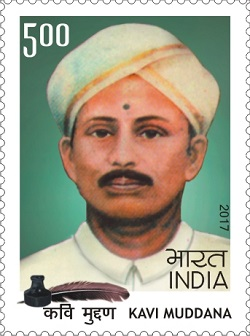
Muddana on a 2017 stamp of India

Nandalike Lakshminaranappa, known by his pseudonym Muddana (24 January 1870 – 15 February 1901), was a Kannada writer and a Yakshagana poet. He was also known as Mahakavi ("Great Poet") or Mahakavi Muddana. His best known works include Ratnavati Kalyaana(Yakshagana), Sri Rama Pattaabhisheka, Adbhuta Ramayana and Sri Ramashwamedha. He coined the word Kannadam Kasthuriyanthe, where he heartily compares his beloved language Kannada to Kasthuri.

Suffering poverty and poor health, Muddana died at the age of 31. His literary works have been used extensively in Kannada literary educational books.

== Early life ==
Lakshminaranappa was born on 24 January 1870 in Nandalike in Karkala taluk in Karnataka, India. His father was Pathaali Timmappaiah and mother Mahalakshmamma. His physical attractiveness earned him the nickname Muddana, which comes from Muddu (cute) in the Kannada language.

== Literary works ==
Muddana's most famous literary works include:

- Ratnavati Kalyana (Yakshagana play)
- Kumara Vijaya ( Yakshagana play)
- Sri Rama Pattaabhishekam (poetry in Vardhaka Shatpadi format)
- Adbhuta Ramayanam
- Sri Ramashwedham

As a young man, Muddana was modest and shy. He therefore published some of his initial works anonymously. These published literary works include Adbhuta Ramayanam (in modern Kannada prose style), Sri Rama Pattabhishekam (242 Shatpadi format poetry stanzas), ಹಾಗೂ Sri Ramashwemedham (reputedly his greatest work).

Muddana had informed to the publisher that, these works were written by ancient people and that he got these works through his ancestors, and that he did not have any kind of additional information. In the years 1895, 1896 and 1899–1901, these literary works were first published by M.A. Ramanuja Iyyangar and S.G. Narasimhachar of Mysore, Karnataka in their magazines Karnataka Kavya Manjari and Karnataka Kavya Kalaanidhi. Muddana had already sent several of his other works for publishing, in the name of "ancient works", that helped the publisher to believe even these three important works to be of ancient origin and not from Muddana.

His authorship was still unknown at the time of his death in 1901. It emerged in 1929 (that is, 28 years after his death), when Central College Karnataka Association in Bangalore published its Muddana Commemorative Edition book. At that time, Muddana's friends, fellow writers such as Panje Mangesharaya, Benegal Rama Rao, Hurali Bheema Rao, Malali Subba Rao gathered and aggregated all the information they had about Muddana, and proved that those three literary works were indeed written by Muddana and no one else.

In the story Muddana Manorameya Sarasa sallapa, during one night sweet conversation with his beloved wife Manorame, who was requesting him to say romantic stories instead of traditional stories. He heartily compares his beloved language Kannada to Kasthuri. ("kannadam katthuriyalthe"), which tells us the love, affection, gratitude he had for Kannada language.He says Kannada smells so pleasantly as kasthuri (Kasthuri (musk) is a substance secreted by Deer musk to attract the female counter, Alternatively it was extensively used as a natural Perfume in Royal courts and temples also as a human spray during olden days as it was renowned for its pleasant odour).

== In popular culture ==
Muddana Jayanti ("Muddana Birth Anniversary") is celebrated every year in Muddana's birthplace of Nandalike in Karnataka. In 1979, under the leadership of Nandalike Balachandra Rao, a cultural board Kavi Muddana Smaraka Mitra Mandali was formed as a memorial for Muddana. Also, Muddana Memorial building (Kavi Muddana Smaraka Bhavana) was constructed in 1987.
