= Grzegorz Janik =

Polish politician (born 1965)

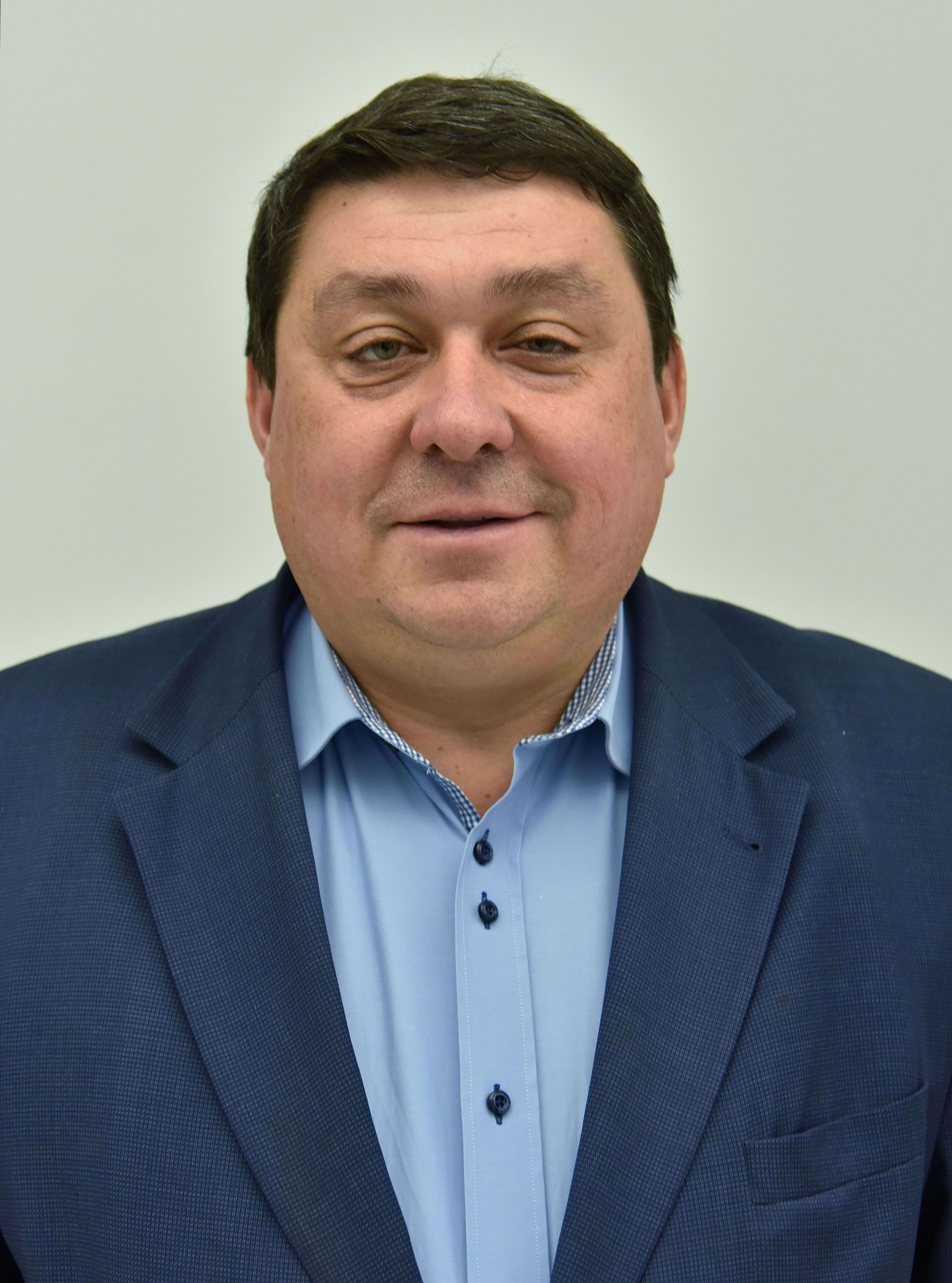

member of Sejm 2005-2007
- In office 25 September 2005 – ?

Personal details
- Born: 27 June 1965 (age 60)
- Party: Law and Justice

Grzegorz Piotr Janik (born 27 June 1965 in Rybnik) is a Polish politician. He was elected to the Sejm on 25 September 2005, getting 4,417 votes in 30 Rybnik district, as a candidate from the Law and Justice list.

== See also ==
- Members of Polish Sejm 2005-2007
