= Adam Banasiak =

Polish footballer (born 1989)

Personal information
- Date of birth: 7 December 1989 (age 36)
- Place of birth: Tomaszów Mazowiecki, Poland
- Height: 1.85 m (6 ft 1 in)
- Position: Midfielder

Team information
- Current team: Ceramika Opoczno
- Number: 10

Senior career*
Years	Team	Apps	(Gls)
- Lechia Tomaszów Mazowiecki
2008	Ceramika Opoczno		
2008–2012	Legia Warszawa (ME)	59	(7)
2010–2012	Legia Warszawa	1	(0)
2010–2011	→ GKP Gorzów Wlkp. (loan)	18	(3)
2011–2012	→ Olimpia Elbląg (loan)	23	(2)
2012–2013	Widzew Łódź	5	(0)
2013–2017	Olimpia Grudziądz	107	(12)
2017–2019	Zagłębie Sosnowiec	39	(3)
2019–2021	Radomiak Radom	52	(4)
2021–2022	Chrobry Głogów	11	(0)
2022–	Ceramika Opoczno	79	(19)
- * Club domestic league appearances and goals as of 11:18, 19 June 2025 (UTC)

Adam Banasiak (born 7 December 1989) is a Polish professional footballer who plays as a midfielder for IV liga Łódź club Ceramika Opoczno.

== Career ==
=== Club ===
In August 2010, he was loaned to GKP Gorzów Wlkp. from Legia Warszawa.

In July 2011, he was loaned to Olimpia Elbląg on a one-year deal.

== Honours ==
Radomiak Radom

- I liga: 2020–21
- II liga: 2018–19
