= Radosław Jacek =

Polish footballer

Personal information
- Full name: Radosław Jacek
- Date of birth: 23 January 1986 (age 40)
- Place of birth: Opole, Poland
- Height: 1.83 m (6 ft 0 in)
- Position: Defender

Team information
- Current team: Wiślanie Skawina (manager)

Youth career
- Odra Opole
- Markus Opole

Senior career*
| Years | Team | Apps | (Gls) |
| 2003–2004 | Wisła Kraków II | | |
| 2005 | Wisła Kraków | 1 | (0) |
| 2005–2007 | Wisła Kraków II | | |
| 2007–2008 | Wisła Kraków (ME) | 26 | (0) |
| 2008 | Zagłębie Sosnowiec | 6 | (0) |
| 2009–2010 | LKS Nieciecza | 45 | (0) |
| 2011 | LKS Nieciecza II | | |
| 2011–2015 | Okocimski Brzesko | 121 | (8) |
| 2016 | ŁKS Łódź | 11 | (1) |
| 2017 | Okocimski Brzesko | | |

Managerial career
- 2021–2024: Unia Tarnów
- 2024–2025: KSZO Ostrowiec
- 2025–: Wiślanie Skawina
- * Club domestic league appearances and goals

Radosław Jacek (born 23 January 1986) is a Polish professional football manager and former player who is currently in charge of III liga club Wiślanie Skawina.

== Managerial statistics ==
As of match played 30 May 2026

Managerial record by team and tenure
| Team | From | To | Record | | | | | | | |
| Team | From | To | G | W | D | L | GF | GA | GD | Win % |
|---|---|---|---|---|---|---|---|---|---|---|
| Unia Tarnów | 11 August 2021 | 30 June 2024 | 112 | 39 | 28 | 45 | 183 | 189 | −6 | 34.82 |
| KSZO Ostrowiec | 1 July 2024 | 14 June 2025 | 35 | 19 | 7 | 9 | 56 | 41 | +15 | 54.29 |
| Wiślanie Skawina | 1 July 2025 | Present | 36 | 16 | 7 | 13 | 59 | 55 | +4 | 44.44 |
| Total | | | 183 | 74 | 42 | 67 | 298 | 285 | +13 | 40.44 |

== Honours ==
=== Player ===
LKS Nieciecza

- II liga East: 2009–10

Okocimski Brzesko

- II liga East: 2011–12

=== Managerial ===
Unia Tarnów

- IV liga Lesser Poland East: 2019–20, 2020–21
- Polish Cup (Tarnów regionals): 2022–23
