= Tomasz Baliga =

Polish footballer

Personal information
- Full name: Tomasz Baliga
- Date of birth: 6 November 1988 (age 37)
- Place of birth: Kraków, Poland
- Height: 1.74 m (5 ft 9 in)
- Position: Defender

Team information
- Current team: Radziszowianka Radziszów
- Number: 13

Youth career
- Armatura Kraków

Senior career*
| Years | Team | Apps | (Gls) |
| 2004–2005 | Cracovia II | | |
| 2006–2011 | Cracovia | 6 | (0) |
| 2010–2011 | → Okocimski KS Brzesko (loan) | 23 | (0) |
| 2011–2013 | Okocimski KS Brzesko | 36 | (1) |
| 2013 | Przebój Wolbrom | 7 | (0) |
| 2014 | Górnik Libiąż | 10 | (0) |
| 2014–2015 | Garbarnia Kraków | 28 | (0) |
| 2018– | Radziszowianka Radziszów | 87 | (3) |
- * Club domestic league appearances and goals as of 6 November 2024

Tomasz Baliga (born 6 November 1988) is a Polish footballer who plays as a defender for Radziszowianka Radziszów.

== Career ==
In August 2010, he was loaned to Okocimski KS Brzesko on a one-year deal.

== Honours ==
Okocimski KS Brzesko

- II liga East: 2011–12

Radziszowianka Radziszów

- Regional league Kraków II: 2021–22
