= Artur Lenartowski =

Polish footballer (born 1988)

Personal information
- Date of birth: 17 March 1988 (age 38)
- Place of birth: Częstochowa, Poland
- Height: 1.92 m (6 ft 4 in)
- Position: Midfielder

Team information
- Current team: Warta Poraj
- Number: 3

Youth career
- 2002–2003: Olimpijczyk Częstochowa
- 2003–2005: Raków Częstochowa

Senior career*
| Years | Team | Apps | (Gls) |
| 2005–2011 | Raków Częstochowa | 89 | (19) |
| 2009 | → Piast Gliwice (loan) | 1 | (0) |
| 2011–2014 | Korona Kielce | 62 | (6) |
| 2014–2015 | Podbeskidzie Bielsko-Biała | 9 | (0) |
| 2015–2016 | Ruch Chorzów | 8 | (1) |
| 2016–2017 | GKS Bełchatów | 24 | (3) |
| 2017–2019 | Elana Toruń | 31 | (4) |
| 2019–2020 | Siarka Tarnobrzeg | 16 | (0) |
| 2020–2022 | Raków Częstochowa II | 45 | (9) |
| 2024–2025 | Lotnik Kościelec | 13 | (1) |
| 2025–2026 | Płomień Lgota Mała | 9 | (0) |
| 2026– | Warta Poraj | 14 | (2) |
- * Club domestic league appearances and goals as of 13:13, 30 August 2026 (UTC)

Artur Lenartowski (born 17 March 1988) is a Polish professional footballer who plays as a midfielder for Warta Poraj.

== Honours ==
Elana Toruń

- III liga, group II: 2017–18

Raków Częstochowa II

- IV liga Silesia I: 2020–21, 2021–22
