= Jan Furlepa =

Polish football manager

Personal information
- Date of birth: 23 April 1945 (age 81)
- Place of birth: Kętrzyn, Poland

Managerial career
- Years: Team
- 1996–1997: Naprzód Rydułtowy
- 1998–1999: Naprzód Rydułtowy
- 1999–2000: Concordia Knurów
- 2001–2002: Włókniarz Kietrz
- 2003: GKS Jastrzębie
- 2003–2004: Podbeskidzie Bielsko-Biała
- 2004–2005: MKS Lędziny
- 2006: Piast Gliwice
- 2010: GKS Jastrzębie
- 2010: Piast Gliwice (assistant)
- 2010–2011: ROW Rybnik
- 2011–2012: Naprzód Rydułtowy
- 2012–2013: Stal Bielsko-Biała
- 2014: ROW Rybnik
- 2014–2015: Iskra Pszczyna
- 2015: Podbeskidzie Bielsko-Biała (assistant)
- 2016–2017: Odra Opole
- 2017–2018: MKS Kluczbork
- 2018–2019: Kotwica Kołobrzeg
- 2019: Spójnia Landek
- 2019: LKS Bełk
- 2019–2021: MKS Kluczbork
- 2021–2022: Kuźnia Ustroń
- 2022–2023: Pniówek Pawłowice Śląskie
- 2024–2025: Polonia Głubczyce
- 2026: Concordia Knurów

Jan Furlepa (born 23 April 1956) is a Polish professional football manager, most recently in charge of Concordia Knurów.
