= Dariusz Żuraw =

Polish footballer and manager (born 1972)

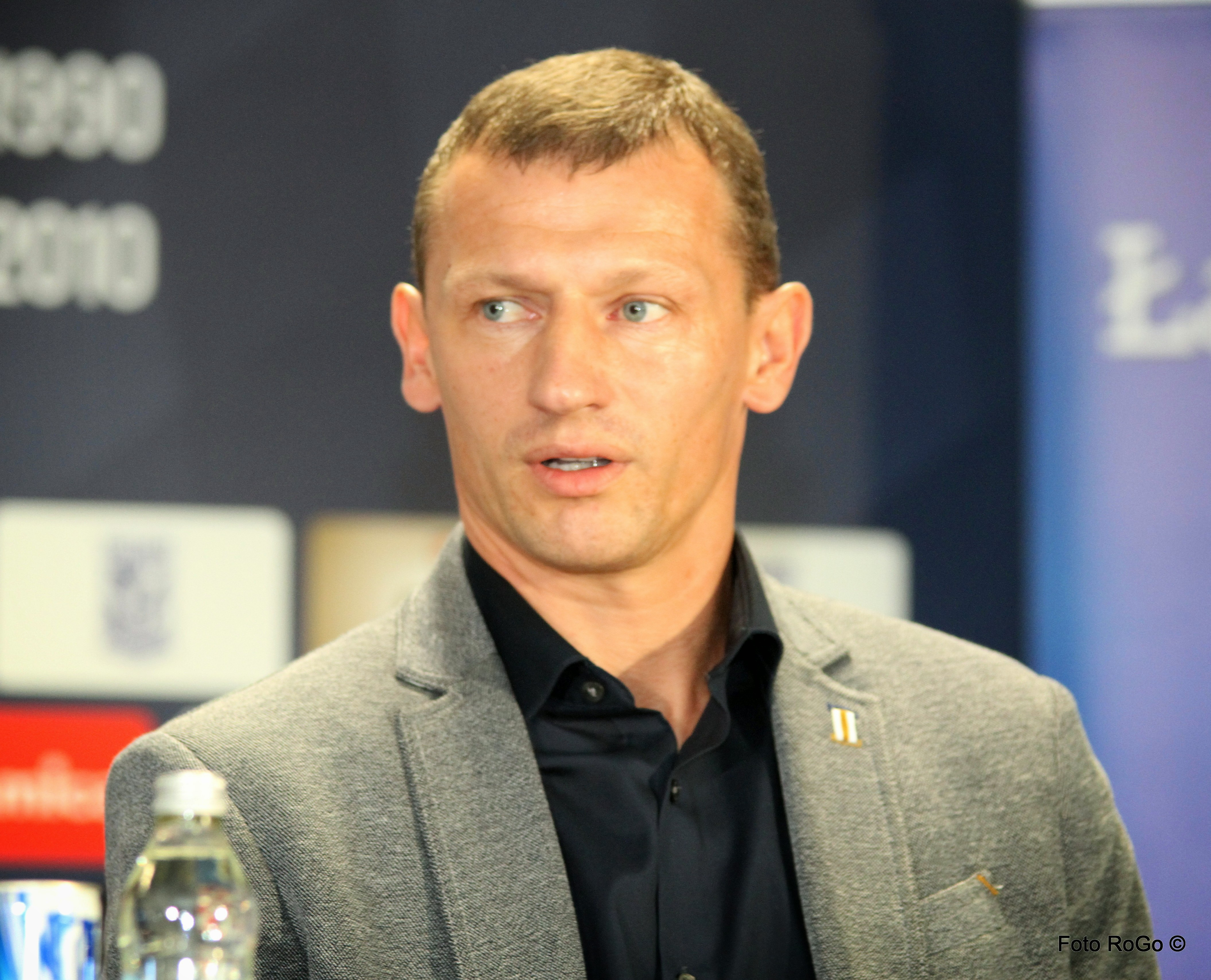
- Żuraw in 2014

Personal information
- Full name: Dariusz Żuraw
- Date of birth: 14 November 1972 (age 53)
- Place of birth: Wieluń, Poland
- Height: 1.83 m (6 ft 0 in)
- Position: Centre-back

Senior career*
Years	Team	Apps	(Gls)
1989–1990	LZS Ostrówek		
1990–1992	LZS Rychłocice	5	(0)
1992–1996	WKS Wieluń	71	(4)
1996–1997	Okocimski KS Brzesko	42	(2)
1997–2001	Zagłębie Lubin	100	(10)
2001–2008	Hannover 96	146	(7)
2008–2009	Arka Gdynia	30	(6)
2009–2011	WKS Wieluń		

International career
2005	Poland	1	(0)

Managerial career
- 2010–2012: WKS Wieluń
- 2012–2013: Odra Opole
- 2014: Miedź Legnica
- 2017–2018: Znicz Pruszków
- 2018–2019: Lech Poznań II
- 2018: Lech Poznań (caretaker)
- 2019–2021: Lech Poznań
- 2021: Zagłębie Lubin
- 2022–2023: Podbeskidzie Bielsko-Biała
- 2023–2024: Wisła Płock
- * Club domestic league appearances and goals

Dariusz Żuraw (born 14 November 1972) is a Polish professional football manager and former player who was most recently in charge of Wisła Płock. Besides Poland, he has played in Germany.

== Club career ==
Born in Wieluń, Żuraw began his career in his native Poland, playing for a succession of lower league teams: LZS Ostrówek, LZS Rychłocice, WKS Wieluń, Okocimski KS Brzesko, Zagłębie Lubin.

He was spotted by Hannover 96, then of 2. Bundesliga, and moved there on 24 October 2001, making his debut a month later on 28 November 2001 in a DFB-Pokal tie against VfL Wolfsburg II. He immediately enjoyed success, as the club won promotion, comfortably finishing as champions.

Żuraw's first game at the top level was also a memorable occasion as he scored after just 6 minutes against Hamburger SV.

He was a regular fixture in defence during his seven seasons with Hannover 96; in 2004–05, he was just one game away from being an ever-present (as suspension ruled him out).

In 2008, he transferred to the Polish Ekstraklasa club Arka Gdynia, on a free transfer from Hannover 96.

== International career ==
Żuraw made one appearance for the Poland national team, in a 3–1 friendly defeat to Belarus on 9 February 2005.

== Managerial career ==
Ahead of the 2017–18 season, Żuraw took over as manager at Znicz Pruszków, newly relegated to the third-tier II liga.

From 31 March 2019 to 6 April 2021, he served as manager of Ekstraklasa club Lech Poznań.

On 6 September 2022, he was appointed manager of second-tier side Podbeskidzie Bielsko-Biała, signing a deal until June 2024. On 3 June 2023, during a press conference following a 4–3 comeback win against Resovia, which saw Podbeskidzie finish the season in 7th, one spot short of promotion play-offs, Żuraw announced he would be leaving the team with immediate effect.

On 26 October 2023, Żuraw took charge of another I liga club Wisła Płock. After losing the last three games of the regular season and missing out on the promotion play-offs by two points, Żuraw left the club by mutual consent on 27 May 2024.

== Managerial statistics ==
As of match played 26 May 2024

Managerial record by team and tenure
Team	From	To	Record							
Team	From	To	G	W	D	L	GF	GA	GD	Win %
WKS Wieluń	14 October 2010	17 August 2012	60	32	15	13	109	64	+45	53.33
Odra Opole	16 September 2012	19 November 2013	49	27	13	9	82	49	+33	55.10
Miedź Legnica	8 May 2014	14 June 2014	6	2	2	2	7	7	+0	33.33
Znicz Pruszków	21 June 2017	8 May 2018	30	9	8	13	36	44	−8	30.00
Lech Poznań II	4 June 2018	4 November 2018	17	11	3	3	40	19	+21	64.71
Lech Poznań (caretaker)	4 November 2018	25 November 2018	2	1	1	0	4	3	+1	50.00
Lech Poznań II	25 November 2018	31 March 2019	5	4	0	1	10	4	+6	80.00
Lech Poznań	31 March 2019	6 April 2021	89	39	25	25	150	101	+49	43.82
Zagłębie Lubin	16 July 2021	16 December 2021	21	8	2	11	24	36	−12	38.10
Podbeskidzie	6 September 2022	3 June 2023	25	8	13	4	48	36	+12	32.00
Wisła Płock	26 October 2023	27 May 2024	22	10	5	7	31	29	+2	45.45
Total			326	151	87	88	541	392	+149	46.32

== Honours ==
=== Manager ===
Odra Opole

- III liga Opole–Silesia: 2012–13
- Polish Cup (Opole regional level): 2012–13

Individual

- Ekstraklasa Coach of the Month: June 2020, July 2020
