= Nandalike =

Coordinates: 13°11′N 74°54′E

- Village
- Interactive map of Nandalike
- Country: India
- State: Karnataka
- District: Udupi

Government
  - Body: Gram Panchayat

Languages
  - Official: Kannada
- Time zone: UTC+5:30 (IST)
- PIN: 576111
- Nearest city: Udupi
- Literacy: 90%
- Lok Sabha constituency: Udupi
- Vidhan Sabha constituency: karkala
- Civic agency: Gram Panchayat

Nandalike is a village in Karkala taluk in the Udupi District in Karnataka, India. It is approximately 16 km east of Padubidri and about 15 km from Karkala town.

Tulu and Kannada are the most widely spoken languages. Other languages spoken here include konkani.

== Notable people ==
- Muddana, Kannada poet and writer better known as Mahakavi ("Great Poet") or Mahakavi Muddana.
- Nandalike Balachandra Rao, a writer and bank employee from Mangalore.
- Bidaram Krishnappa, a famous carnatic musician in the court of the Wodeyars of Mysore.
