= Kannur, Dakshina Kannada =

Kannur, Dakshina Kannada Kannooru
- census town
- Location in Karnataka, India
- Coordinates: 12.87°N 74.9°E
- Country: India
- State: Karnataka
- District: Dakshina Kannada

Population (2001)
  - Total: 7,241

Languages
  - Official: Kannada
- Time zone: UTC+5:30 (IST)
- ISO 3166 code: IN-KL

Kannur is a census town in Dakshina Kannada district, and a locality in the Mangalore City Corporation, in the Indian state of Karnataka.

== Demographics ==
As of 2001 India census, Kannur had a population of 7241. Males constitute 51% of the population and females 49%. Kannur has an average literacy rate of 71%, higher than the national average of 59.5%; male literacy is 78%, and female literacy is 65%. In Kannur, 15% of the population is under 6 years of age.
