= Suralu Mud Palace =

Palace in Karnataka

Coordinates: 13.4471°N 74.8550°E

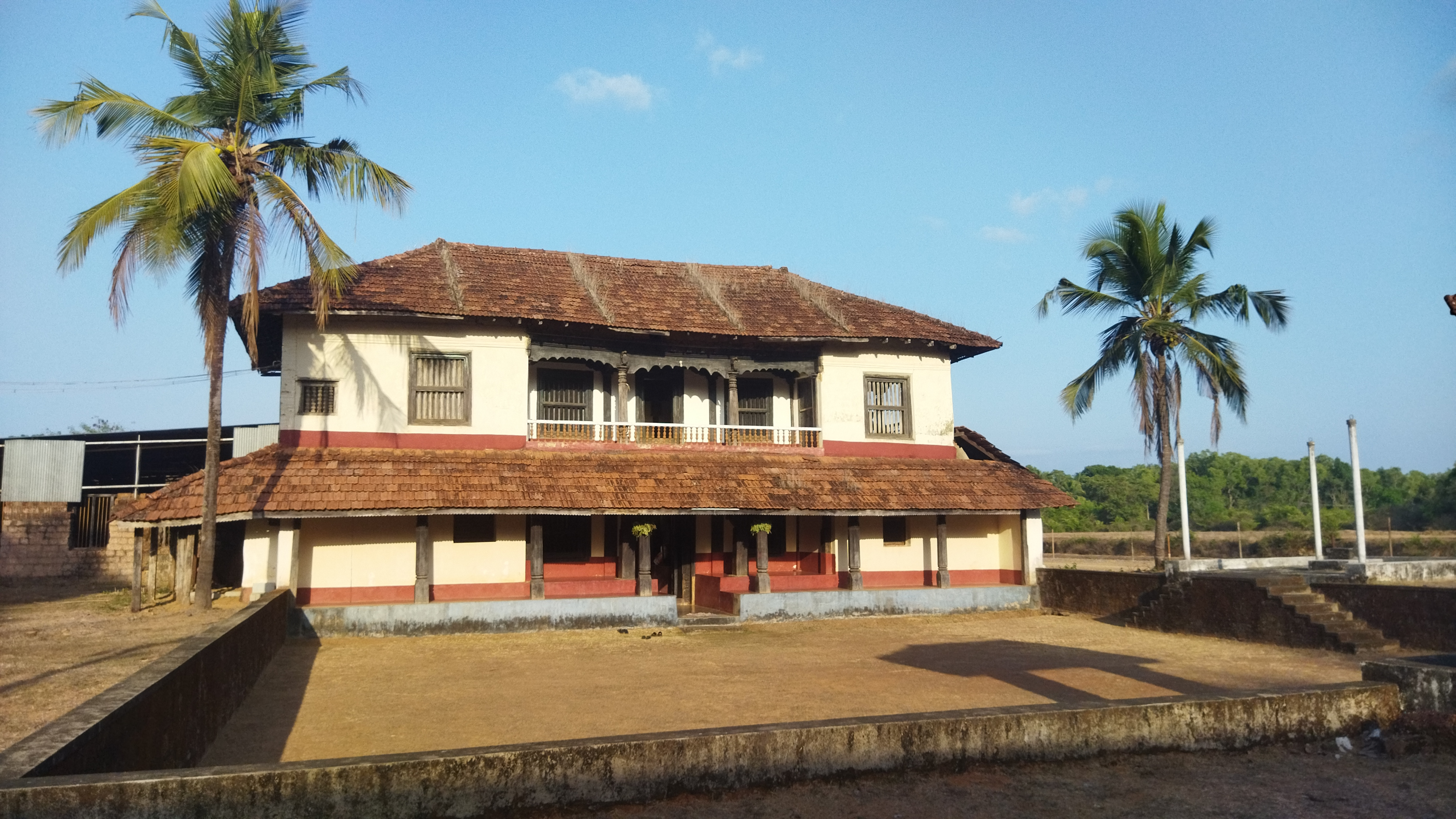
- The Façade of the palace
- Interactive map of the Suralu Mud Palace area

General information
- Location: Sural village, Karnataka, India
- Completed: 1511
- Owner: Sudarshan Shetty

Technical details
- Material: Clay

Suralu Mud Palace, also known as just Sural Palace, is located in Sural village near Udupi. The palace was built in 1511 by the Tolahara dynasty who ruled parts of Udupi at the time. The palace had housed 8-9 families of the dynasty. It currently belongs to Sudarshan Shetty who is a descendant of the dynasty.

== Description ==
The palace was made using mud and timber. Clay was used to build the walls and rooftops were made using country tiles. The palace consists of seven "angalas" (courtyards) and a Shrine for the Goddess Padmavathi. The palace also consists of bathrooms, a shed, kitchens and a storehouse of agricultural crops. The upper rooms were home to the women of the palace. The layout of the palace is designed in such a way as to prevent women from accessing the ground floor. The roof is supported by wooden pillars through the use of the inter-lock method, no nails used in the process. The palace corridor’s lintel carries an inscription dated 1828, which states that it was renovated that year. The palace also contains a collection of ornate sculptures.

== Gallery ==
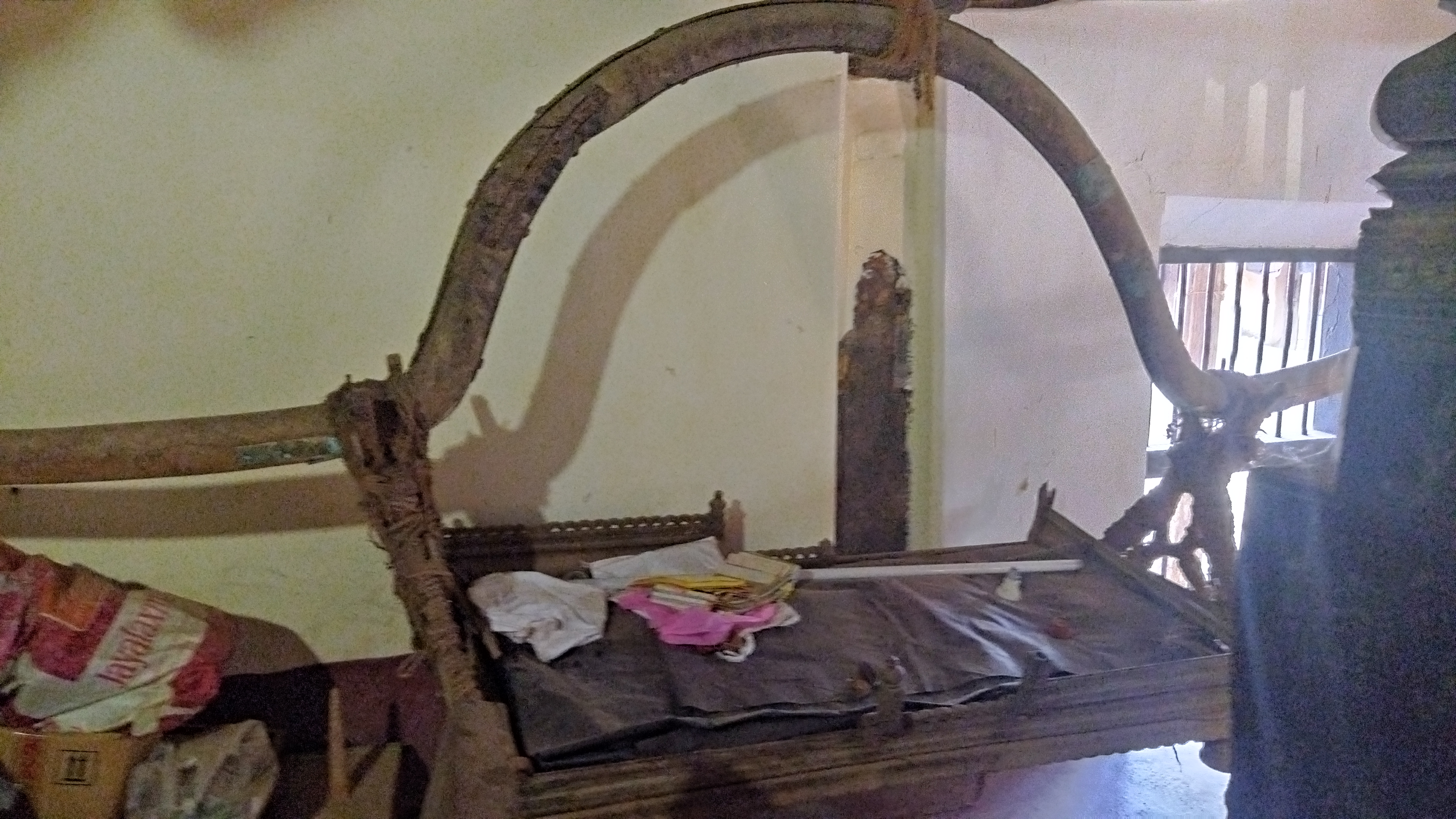
Palna

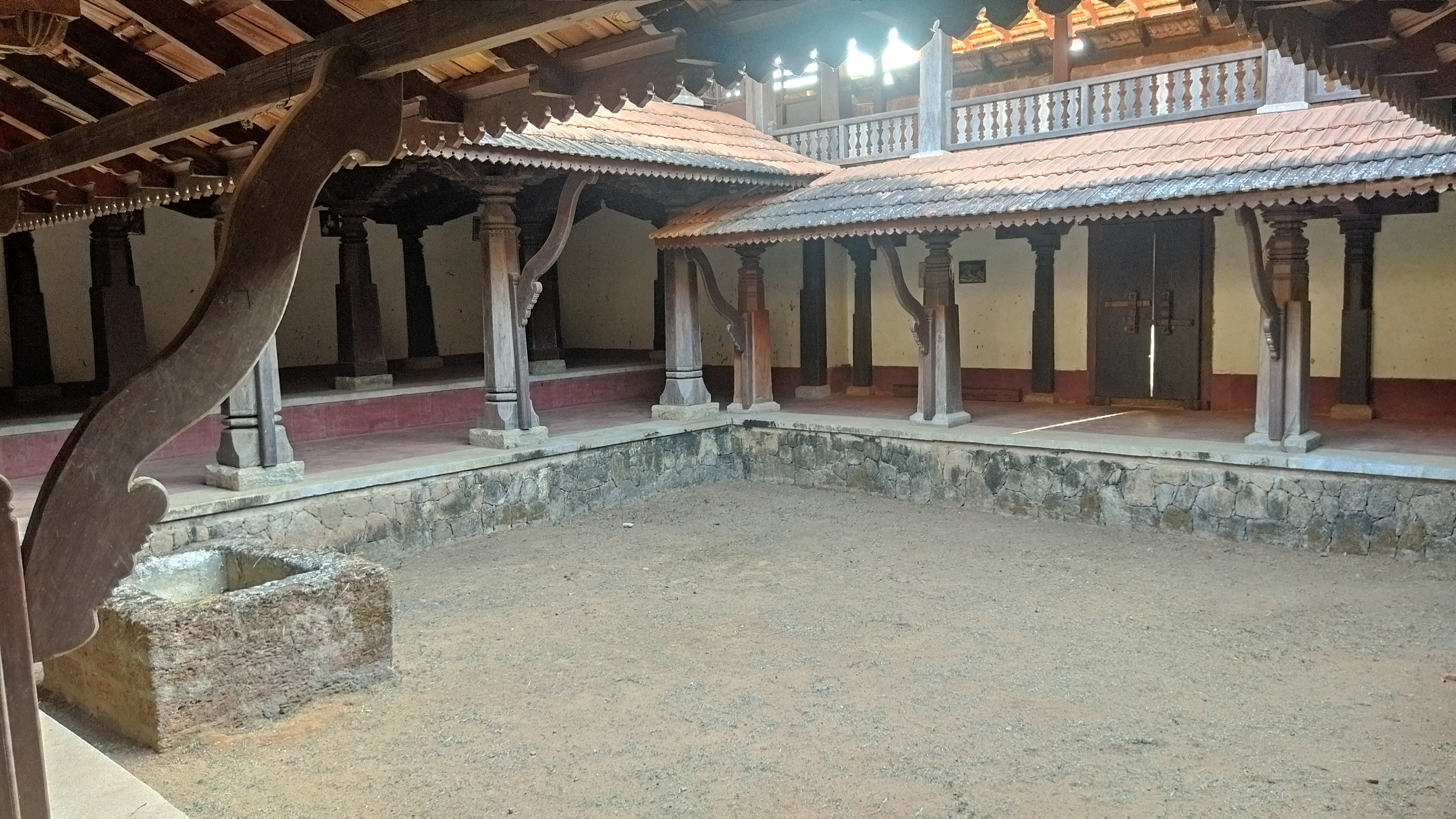
Internal courtyard of the palace

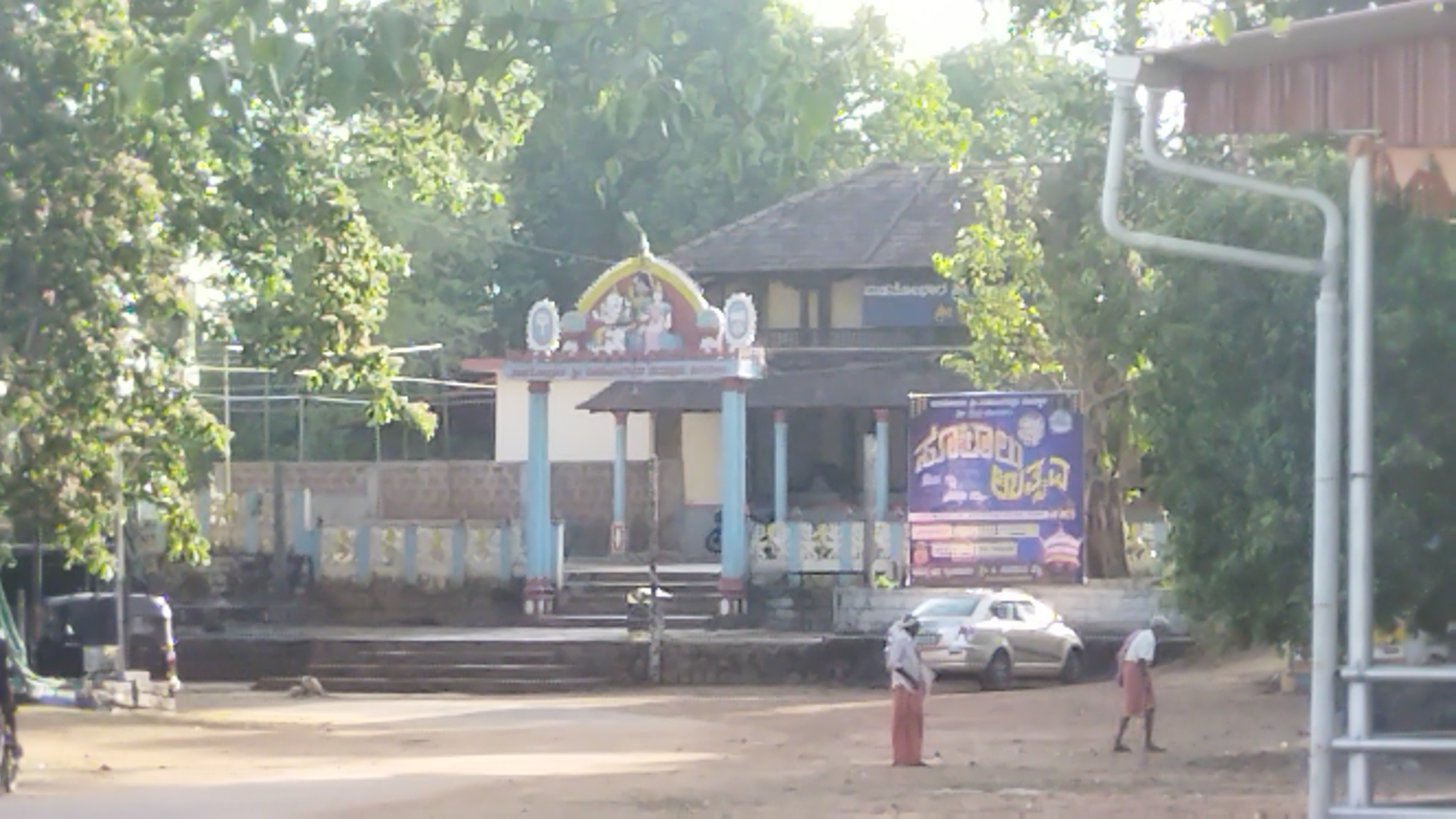
Suralu Mahalingeshwara Temple

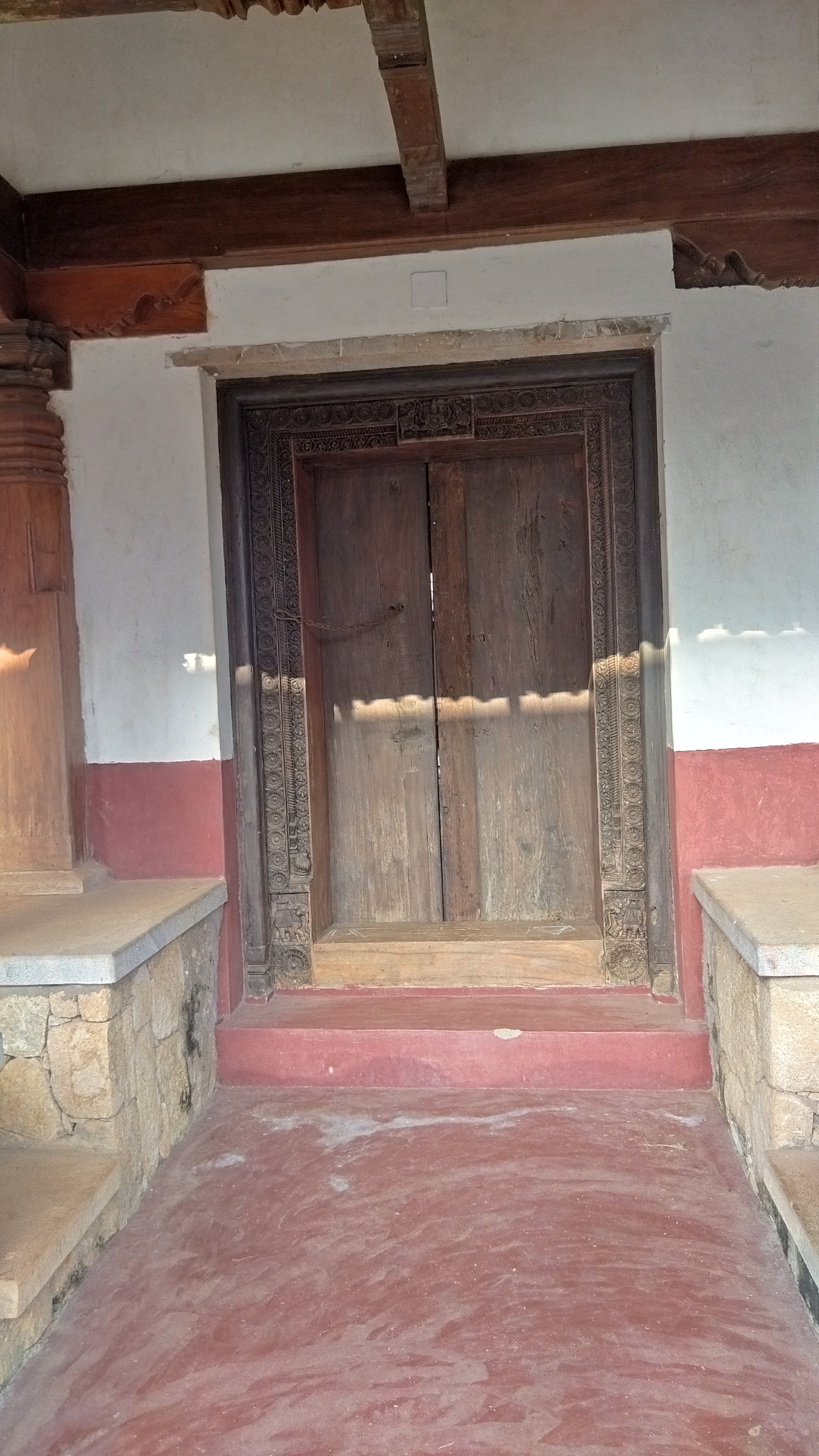
Gate

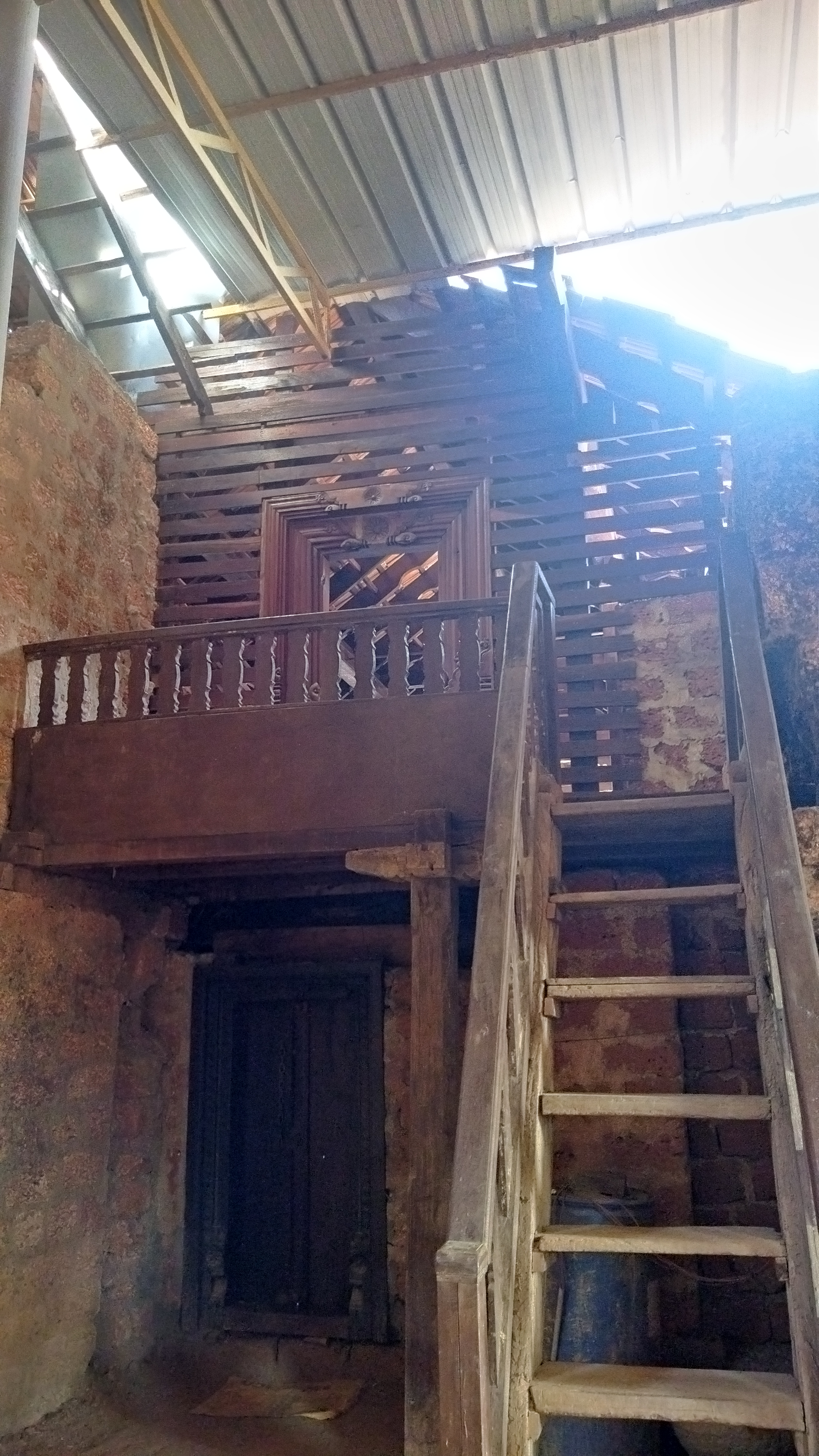
Staircase
