= Richard Zajac =

Slovak footballer

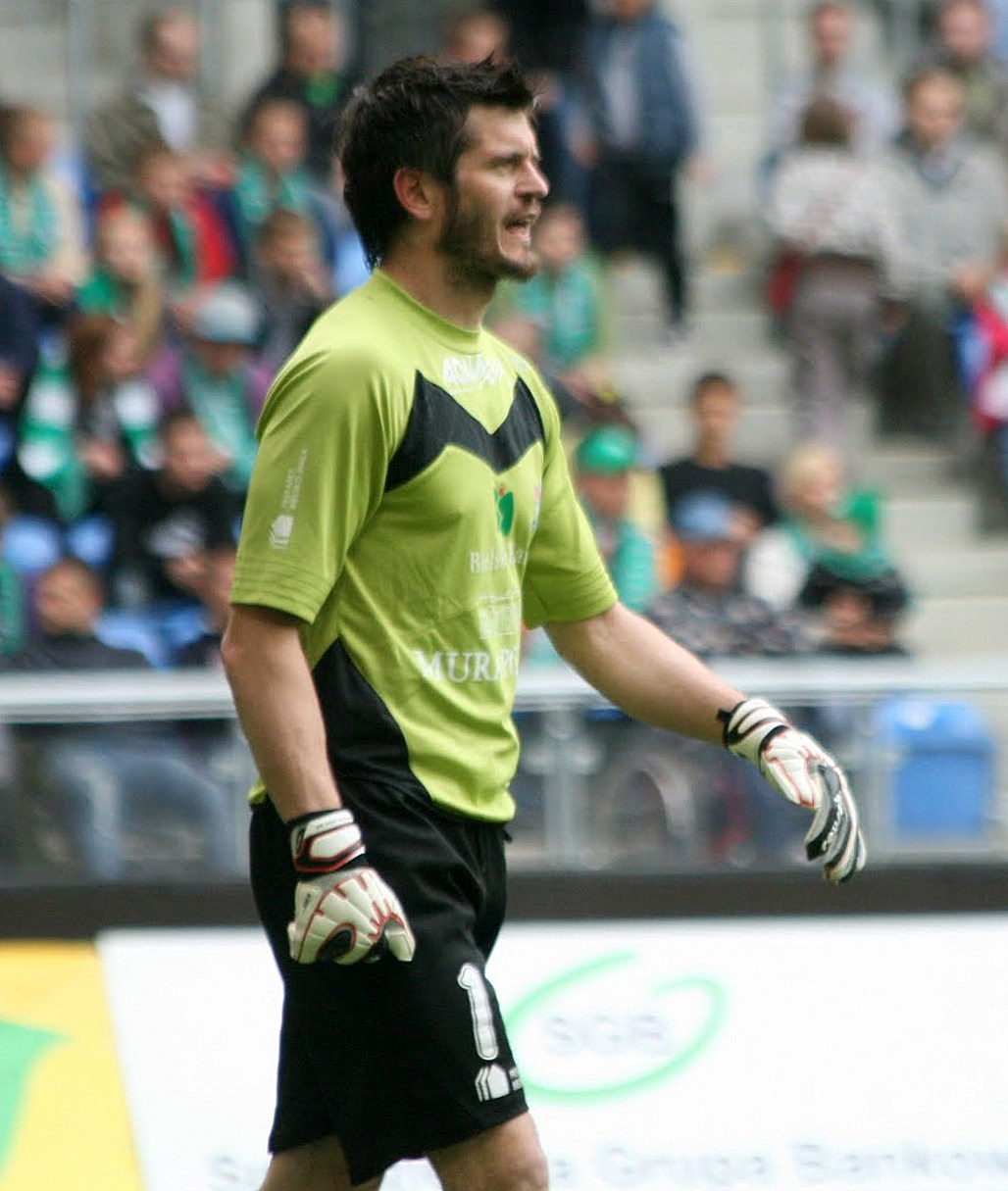

Personal information
- Full name: Richard Zajac
- Date of birth: 16 August 1976 (age 50)
- Place of birth: Žilina, Czechoslovakia
- Height: 1.86 m (6 ft 1 in)
- Position: Goalkeeper

Team information
- Current team: GLKS Wilkowice
- Number: 1

Youth career
- 1984–1989: OŠK Nededza
- 1989–1996: Dukla Banská Bystrica

Senior career*
Years	Team	Apps	(Gls)
1996–2008	Dukla Banská Bystrica	141	(0)
1999	→ FK Dubová (loan)		
2008–2010	Dubnica	38	(0)
2010–2015	Podbeskidzie	134	(0)
2020–	GLKS Wilkowice	105	(0)
- * Club domestic league appearances and goals as of 25 July 2024

Richard Zajac (born 16 August 1976) is a Slovak footballer who plays as a goalkeeper for Polish V liga club GLKS Wilkowice.

== Honours ==
Dukla Banská Bystrica

- Slovak Cup: 2004–05

GLKS Wilkowice

- Klasa A Bielsko-Biała: 2020–21
