= Hernâni (footballer, born 1984) =

Brazilian footballer

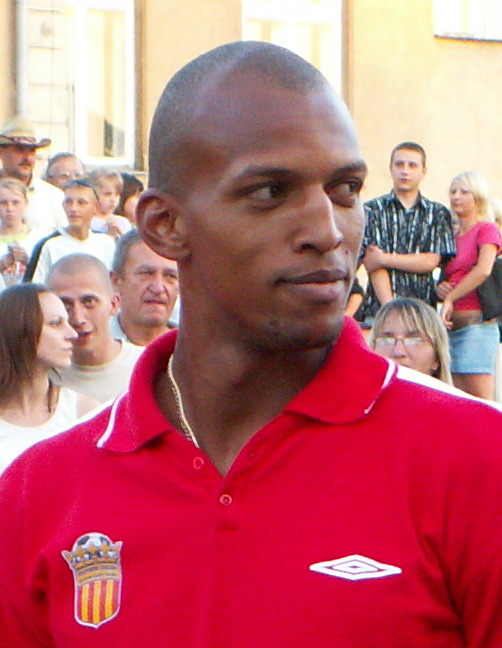
- Hernâni with Korona Kielce in July 2006

Personal information
- Full name: Hernâni José da Rosa
- Date of birth: 3 February 1984 (age 42)
- Place of birth: Antônio Carlos, Brazil
- Height: 1.91 m (6 ft 3 in)
- Position: Defender

Senior career*
| Years | Team | Apps | (Gls) |
| 2002 | Grêmio | | |
| 2003 | Avaí | | |
| 2003–2005 | Górnik Zabrze | 31 | (0) |
| 2005–2012 | Korona Kielce | 154 | (4) |
| 2012–2015 | Pogoń Szczecin | 72 | (3) |
| 2017 | Kalwarianka Kalwaria Z. | 5 | (1) |
| 2017 | Bielawianka Bielawa | 8 | (0) |
| 2018–2019 | KS Zakopane | 22 | (8) |
| 2019 | Glinik Gorlice | 15 | (1) |
| 2020 | Barciczanka Barcice | 0 | (0) |
| 2024 | JKS Jarosław | 5 | (0) |
- * Club domestic league appearances and goals as of 5 July 2024

Hernâni José da Rosa (Portuguese pronunciation: [eʁˈnɐ̃ɲi ʒuˈzɛ dɐ ˈʁɔzɐ]; born 3 February 1984), also known just as Hernâni, is a Brazilian professional footballer who plays as a central defender.

== Career ==
Hernâni was born in Antônio Carlos. He signed for Korona Kielce in 2005; his previous Polish club was Górnik Zabrze. In July 2011 Hernâni commenced a trial with West Ham United including being part of their pre-season tour in Switzerland.

== Personal life ==
He received Polish citizenship on 27 January 2011.
