= Ganapathi Rao Aigal =

Manjeshwar Ganapathi Rao Aigal
- Born: 1881
- Died: 1944 (aged 62–63)
- Writing career
- Language: Konkani Kannada
- Genre: History

Manjeshwar Ganapathi Rao Aigal (1881–1944) was a historian and served as a teacher in Bantwal, Dakshina Kannada. He was the author of Dakshina Kannada Jilleya Prachina Itihasa (Ancient History of Dakshina Kannada), published in 1923.

== Works ==
1. Sthala Puranagalu Series (Mangalore, Kollur, Polali, Kumbale, Subramanya, Dharmasthala, Udyavara) Not available.
2. Sthala Puranagalu Series - Manjeshwara
3. Shri Kashimathada Charithre

== Documentation of Paād-danāas ==
Paād-danāas are songs or ballads rendered in Tulu language, describing the origin and the deeds of the legends in the rituals of Bhuta Kola.

1. Attavara Daivongulu (1928)
2. Tulu Paddanolu (1933) (Todakinar, Mandattaye, Bobbarya, Kallurti, Kalkuda)
3. Bobbarya
4. Mundatthaye
