= Okocimski KS Brzesko =

Polish football club

- Full name: Stowarzyszenie Sportowe; Okocimski Klub Sportowy Brzesko
- Nickname: Piwosze (Beer Lovers)
- Founded: 6 September 1933; 92 years ago
- Ground: OKS Brzesko Stadium
- Capacity: 3,000
- Chairman: Piotr Kościółek
- Manager: Sebastian Klimczyk
- League: IV liga Lesser Poland
- 2024–25: V liga Lesser Poland East, 1st of 16 (promoted)
- Website: okocimski.com
colours	colours

Okocimski KS Brzesko is a Polish football club based in Brzesko, Poland. The club is currently playing in the IV liga Lesser Poland, the fifth division of Polish league football.

In the 1994–95 season, they achieved their best league performance by finishing fourth in the I liga, the second level division, barely missing out on promotion to the Ekstraklasa.

== Current squad ==
As of early 2026

Note: Flags indicate national team as defined under FIFA eligibility rules; some limited exceptions apply. Players may hold more than one non-FIFA nationality.

No.	Pos.	Nation	Player
1	GK	POL	Krzysztof Puchal
3	DF	POL	Adam Klimczyk
4	DF	POL	Jakub Baran
5	DF	POL	Daniel Kaciczak
6	DF	POL	Michał Zydroń
7	FW	POL	Mateusz Cięciwa
8	DF	POL	Maciej Węgrzyn
9	FW	POL	Szymon Kozieł
10	FW	POL	Dawid Lizak
11	DF	POL	Patryk Jawień
12	GK	POL	Piotr Zagórowski

No.	Pos.	Nation	Player
13	FW	POL	Marcel Kubala
15	DF	POL	Adrian Piekarz
16	FW	POL	Paweł Borowiec
17	MF	POL	Kacper Rojkowicz
18	MF	POL	Nikodem Mgłosiek
19	MF	POL	Kacper Ciuruś
20	MF	POL	Kacper Sowa
21	FW	POL	Mariusz Mazanek
22	MF	POL	Sebastian Pasek
24	MF	POL	Dominik Grochot
26	MF	POL	Michał Siudut

== Notable players ==
Had international caps for Poland.

- (Poland) Dariusz Żuraw (1996–1997)

== Achievements and honours ==
- 4th place in the second tier: 1994–95
- II liga winners: 2011–12 (East)
- III liga winners: 2005–06 (Lesser Poland Nowy Sącz-Tarnów group)
- V liga Lesser Poland winners: 2024–25 (Eastern Lesser Poland group)
- Regional league winners: 2017–18 (Tarnów I group)
- Polish Cup round of 16: 1950–51, 1995–96
