= List of Legia Warsaw records and statistics =

This page contains Legia's records and statistics. Legia Warsaw is a professional football club based in Warsaw, Poland. It is the most successful Polish football club in history, winning record 15 Ekstraklasa champions titles, a record 20 Polish Cup and 5 Polish Super Cup trophies. These stats does not take into account records and statistics of other sections of Legia.

== Player records ==
=== Most appearances ===
==== All competitions ====
As of matches played 21 April 2025

Rank	Player	Nationality	Years	Total
1	Lucjan Brychczy	Poland	1954–1972	452
2	Artur Jędrzejczyk	Poland	2006–13, 2016, 2017–	416
3	Jacek Zieliński	Poland	1992–2005	404
4	Miroslav Radović	Serbia	2006–14, 2016–19	391
5	Kazimierz Deyna	Poland	1966–1978	388
6	Jakub Rzeźniczak	Poland	2004–06, 2007–17	376
7	Michał Kucharczyk	Poland	2010–2019	349
8	Marek Jóźwiak	Poland	1988–2005	348
9	Horst Mahseli	Poland	1955–1969	347
10	Tomasz Kiełbowicz	Poland	2001–2012	339

==== European cups ====
As of match played 5 October 2025

Rank	Player	Nationality	Years	Total
1	Artur Jędrzejczyk	Poland	2006–13, 2016, 2017–	70
2	Michał Kucharczyk	Poland	2010–2019	67
3	Jakub Rzeźniczak	Poland	2004–06, 2007–17	61
4	Miroslav Radović	Serbia	2006–14, 2016–19	56
5	Tomasz Jodłowiec	Poland	2013–17, 2018, 2019	50
6	Dušan Kuciak	Slovakia	2011–2016	47
7	Paweł Wszołek	Poland	2019–2021, 2022–	43
8	Bernard Blaut	Poland	1962–1972	41
9	Michał Żyro	Poland	2009–2015	41
10	Antoni Trzaskowski	Poland	1961–1973	40

==== Foreign players, all competitions ====
As of matches played 21 April 2025

Rank	Player	Nationality	Years	Total
1	Miroslav Radović	Serbia	2006–14, 2016–19	391
2	Iñaki Astiz	Spain	2007–15, 2017–21	273
3	Aleksandar Vuković	Serbia	2001–04, 2005–08	239
4	Dickson Choto	Zimbabwe	2003–13	209
5	Dušan Kuciak	Slovakia	2011–16	193
6	Ivica Vrdoljak	Croatia	2010–15	191
7	Tomáš Pekhart	Czech Republic	2020–22, 2023–25	173
8	Luquinhas	Brazil	2019–22, 2024–25	156
9	Guilherme	Brazil	2014–17	150
10	Roger Guerreiro	Brazil	2006–09	138

==== By competition ====
- Most appearances in Ekstraklasa: 368 – (Poland) Lucjan Brychczy
- Most appearances in Polish Cup: 54 – (Poland) Jakub Rzeźniczak
- Most appearances in League Cup: 23 – (Poland) Tomasz Kiełbowicz
- Most appearances in Polish Super Cup: 4 – (Poland) Artur Jędrzejczyk, (Poland) Michał Kucharczyk, (Poland) Igor Lewczuk, (Serbia) Miroslav Radović, (Poland) Jakub Rzeźniczak, (Poland) Mateusz Wieteska
- Most appearances in European cups: 68 – (Poland) Artur Jędrzejczyk
- Most appearances in UEFA Champions League: 23 – (Poland) Michał Kucharczyk, (Serbia) Miroslav Radović
- Most appearances in European Cup Winners' Cup: 11 – (Poland) Bernard Blaut, (Poland) Antoni Trzaskowski
- Most appearances in UEFA Intertoto Cup: 12 – (Poland) Tadeusz Nowak
- Most appearances in UEFA Europa League and UEFA Cup combined: 46 – (Poland) Jakub Rzeźniczak
- Most appearances in UEFA Conference League: 34 – (Poland) Paweł Wszołek

==== Others ====
- Youngest first-team player: 16 years, 64 days – (Poland) Mateusz Hołownia v Zawisza Bydgoszcz, 2014 Polish Super Cup, 9 July 2014
- Oldest first-team player: 41 years, 358 days – (Poland) Artur Boruc v Warta Poznań, 2022–23 Ekstraklasa, 13 February 2022
- Oldest debutant: 35 years, 97 days – (Poland) Michał Żewłakow v Gaziantepspor, 2011–12 UEFA Europa League, 28 July 2011
- First foreign player: (Russia) Paweł Akimow (1923–1936), also first foreign player in the history of Ekstraklasa (against Warta Poznań on 15 May 1927)
- Most appearances by a foreign player in all competitions: 391 – (Serbia) Miroslav Radović
- Most appearances by a foreign player in Ekstraklasa: 276 – (Serbia) Miroslav Radović
- Most appearances by a foreign player in international competitions: 56 – (Serbia) Miroslav Radović
- Most appearances in a season in all competitions: 55 – (Brazil) Guilherme and (Hungary) Nemanja Nikolić, 2015–16

=== Goalscorers ===
==== All competitions ====
As of match played 5 October 2025

Rank	Player	Nationality	Years	Total
1	Lucjan Brychczy	Poland	1954–1972	226
2	Kazimierz Deyna	Poland	1966–1978	141
3	Józef Nawrot	Poland	1927–1936	106
4	Miroslav Radović	Serbia	2006–14, 2016–19	93
5	Robert Gadocha	Poland	1967–1975	88
6	Marek Saganowski	Poland	2002–05, 2012–16	87
7	Janusz Żmijewski	Poland	1960–1970	81
8	Cezary Kucharski	Poland	1995–2006	79
9	Marcin Mięciel	Poland	1994–2001, 2009–10	75
10	Marian Łańko	Poland	1925–1930	75

==== Domestic league ====
As of match played 5 October 2025

Rank	Player	Nationality	Years	Total
1	Lucjan Brychczy	Poland	1954–1972	182
2	Józef Nawrot	Poland	1927–1936	106
3	Kazimierz Deyna	Poland	1966–1978	94
4	Marian Łańko	Poland	1925–1930	75
5	Robert Gadocha	Poland	1967–1975	72
6	Miroslav Radović	Serbia	2006–14, 2016–19	67
7	Janusz Żmijewski	Poland	1960–1970	60
8	Józef Ciszewski	Poland	1925–1931	60
9	Marek Saganowski	Poland	2002–05, 2012–16	58
10	Cezary Kucharski	Poland	1995–2006	58

==== Polish Cup ====
As of match played 5 October 2025

Rank	Player	Nationality	Years	Total
1	Lucjan Brychczy	Poland	1954–1972	36
2	Kazimierz Deyna	Poland	1966–1978	30
3	Marek Saganowski	Poland	2002–05, 2012–16	20
4	Ernest Pol	Poland	1953–1956	13
5	Leszek Pisz	Poland	1986–1996	12
6	Henryk Kempny	Poland	1955–1957	12
7	Piotr Włodarczyk	Poland	1997–2007	11
8	Longin Janeczek	Poland	1950–1957	11
9	Henryk Apostel	Poland	1962–69, 1970	10
10	Marek Kusto	Poland	1977–1982	10

==== European cups ====
As of match played 5 October 2025

Rank	Player	Nationality	Years	CL	ICFC	UC/EL	CWC	ConL	IC	Total
1	Miroslav Radović	Serbia	2006–14, 2016–19	9		9				18
2	Kazimierz Deyna	Poland	1966–78	4	2		3		8	17
3	Jan Pieszko	Poland	1967–76	5	3	1	5		2	16
4	Michał Kucharczyk	Poland	2010–19	7		8				15
5	Janusz Żmijewski	Poland	1960–70	3	2		3		4	12
6	Cezary Kucharski	Poland	1995–2006	2		8				10
6	Tomáš Pekhart	Czech Republic	2020–22, 2023–25	1		1		8		10
8	Tomasz Sokołowski	Poland	1994–2001, 2009–10			6	3			9
8	Marc Gual	Spain	2023–					9		9

==== Foreign players, all competitions ====
As of matches played 21 April 2025

Rank	Player	Nationality	Years	Total
1	Miroslav Radović	Serbia	2006–14, 2016–19	93
2	Tomáš Pekhart	Czech Republic	2020–22, 2023–25	63
3	Nemanja Nikolić	Hungary	2015–16	55
4	Stanko Svitlica	Serbia	2001–03	51
5	Takesure Chinyama	Zimbabwe	2007–09	41
6	Danijel Ljuboja	Serbia	2011–13	30
6	Marc Gual	Spain	2023–25	30
8	Josué Pesqueira	Portugal	2022–24	29
9	Ivica Vrdoljak	Croatia	2010–15	26
10	Carlitos	Spain	2018–19, 2022–23	25
10	Luquinhas	Brazil	2019–22, 2024–25	25

==== By competition ====
- Most goals scored in all competitions: 226 – (Poland) Lucjan Brychczy
- Most goals scored in Ekstraklasa: 182 – (Poland) Lucjan Brychczy
- Most goals scored in Polish Cup: 36 – (Poland) Lucjan Brychczy
- Most goals scored in League Cup: 6 – (Poland) Bartłomiej Grzelak
- Most goals scored in Polish Super Cup: 3 – (Poland) Jerzy Podbrożny
- Most goals scored in European cups: 18 – (Serbia) Miroslav Radović
- Most goals scored in UEFA Champions League: 9 – (Serbia) Miroslav Radović
- Most goals scored in European Cup Winners' Cup: 5 – (Poland) Jan Pieszko
- Most goals scored in UEFA Intertoto Cup: 8 – (Poland) Kazimierz Deyna
- Most goals scored in UEFA Europa League and UEFA Cup combined: 9 – (Serbia) Miroslav Radović
- Most goals scored in UEFA Conference League: 9 – (Spain) Marc Gual

==== In a single season ====
This table lists players who have scored more than 25 goals in a single season. Ordered by number of goals scored and by a season.

Rank	Player	Goals	Season	League	Domestic Cups	Continental	Ref
1	(Hungary) Nemanja Nikolić	36	2015–16	28	6	2	
2	(Poland) Marian Łańko	30	1927	30			
3	(Serbia) Stanko Svitlica	29	2002–03	24		5	
4	(Poland) Sylwester Czereszewski	28	1999-00	16	8	4	
5	(Poland) Maciej Śliwowski	28	1992–93	25	3		
6	(Poland) Lucjan Brychczy	27	1964–65	20	5	2	
7	(Poland) Marian Łańko	26	1928	26			
8	(Poland) Henryk Kempny	26	1956	21	5		
9	(Poland) Lucjan Brychczy	25	1956	16	8	1	

==== In a single season by the competition ====
- Most goals scored in a single season in all competitions: 36 – (Hungary) Nemanja Nikolić, 2015–16
- Most goals scored in a single Ekstraklasa season: 28 – (Hungary) Nemanja Nikolić, 2015–16
- Most goals scored in a single Polish Cup season: 8 – (Poland) Lucjan Brychczy, 1956; (Poland) Henryk Apostel, 1963–64; (Poland) Kazimierz Deyna, 1971–72
- Most goals scored in a single Polish League Cup season: 5 – (Poland) Bartłomiej Grzelak, 2007–08
- Most goals scored in a single Champions League season: 6 – (Hungary) Nemanja Nikolić, 2016–17
- Most goals scored in a single European Cup Winners' Cup season: 5 – (Poland) Jan Pieszko
- Most goals scored in a single UEFA Intertoto Cup season: 4 – (Poland) Kazimierz Deyna, 1967–68; (Poland) Janusz Żmijewski, 1967–68; (Poland) Tadeusz Nowak, 1976–77; (Poland) Marek Kusto, 1976–77
- Most goals scored in a single UEFA Europa League or UEFA Cup season: 7 – (Serbia) Miroslav Radović, 2011–12
- Most goals scored in a single UEFA Conference League season: 7 – (Spain) Marc Gual, 2024–25

==== In a single match ====
- Most goals scored in a match in all competitions: 6 – (Poland) Józef Nawrot v Ruch Chorzów, 1930 Ekstraklasa, 30 November 1930
- Most goals scored in a league match: 6 – (Poland) Józef Nawrot v Ruch Chorzów, 1930 Ekstraklasa, 30 November 1930
- Most goals scored in a Polish Cup match: 4
  - (Poland) Ernest Pohl v Błękitni Kielce, 23 May 1954
  - (Poland) Marek Kusto v Gwardia Warsaw, 24 October 1979
  - (Poland) Piotr Włodarczyk v Hetman Zamość, 11 November 2005
- Most goals scored in a Polish League Cup match: 3 – (Poland) Bartłomiej Grzelak v Dyskobolia Grodzisk Wielkopolski, 24 October 2007
- Most goals scored in a Polish Super Cup match: 3 – (Poland) Jerzy Podbrożny v ŁKS Łódź, 24 July 1994
- Most goals scored in a Champions League match: 2
  - (Poland) Robert Gadocha v FC UTA Arad, 1 October 1969
  - (Poland) Lucjan Brychczy v Galatasaray S.K., 18 March 1970
  - (Poland) Władysław Stachurski v IFK Göteborg, 16 September 1970
  - (Poland) Leszek Pisz v Rosenborg BK, 13 September 1995
  - (Serbia) Miroslav Radović v St Patrick's Athletic F.C., 23 July 2014
  - (Serbia) Miroslav Radović v Celtic F.C., 30 July 2014
  - (Hungary) Nemanja Nikolić v Zrinjski Mostar, 19 July 2016
  - (Poland) Michał Kucharczyk v IFK Mariehamn, 19 July 2017
- Most goals scored in a European Cup Winners' Cup match: 3 – (Poland) Jan Pieszko v Vikingur Reykjavik, 27 September 1972
- Most goals scored in a UEFA Intertoto Cup match: 3
  - (Poland) Kazimierz Deyna v AC Bellinzona, 13 July 1967
  - (Poland) Marek Kusto v BSC Young Boys, 17 July 1977
- Most goals scored in a UEFA Europa League or UEFA Cup match: 3
  - (Poland) Piotr Włodarczyk v FC Tbilisi, 26 August 2004
  - (Poland) Marek Saganowski v FK Liepājas Metalurgs, 26 July 2012
- Most goals scored in a UEFA Conference League match: 3
  - (Spain) Marc Gual v Caernarfon Town F.C., 25 July 2024

==== Hat-tricks ====
- Most hat-tricks in all competitions: 13 – (Poland) Lucjan Brychczy, 1956–1967
- Most hat-tricks in Ekstraklasa: 10 – (Poland) Lucjan Brychczy, 1956–1964
- Most hat-tricks in Polish Cup: 3 – (Poland) Lucjan Brychczy, 1956–1967

==== Others ====
- Youngest goalscorer: 16 years, 265 days – (Poland) Ariel Borysiuk v Odra Wodzisław Śląski, 2007–08 Ekstraklasa, 19 April 2008
- Oldest goalscorer: 37 years, 279 days – (Poland) Artur Jędrzejczyk v GKS Katowice, 2025–26 Ekstraklasa, 10 August 2025
- Youngest goalscorer in international competitions: 17 years, 326 days – Mateusz Szczepaniak v AC Omonia, 2024–25 UEFA Conference League, 28 November 2024

=== International ===
- First capped player: Antoni Amirowicz, for Poland against USA on 10 June 1924
- First capped player not for Poland: Kenneth Zeigbo for Nigeria on 7 August 1997
- Most capped player: 97 – (Poland) Kazimierz Deyna
- Most capped player not for Poland: 19 – (Slovakia) Ján Mucha
- Most players from one club in a Poland squad: 9 – against Turkey on 16 November 1956 (jointly with Pogoń Lwów against Hungary on 19 July 1925)
- Most appearances by players from one club in a Poland squad: 1488 (as of 26 November 2022)
- First player to play in the Olympic Games: Franciszek Cebulak for Poland against Germany on 13 August 1936
- First players to play in the World Cup finals: Kazimierz Deyna and Robert Gadocha for Poland against Argentina on 15 June 1974
- First players to win a World Cup winners' medal: Lesław Ćmikiewicz, Kazimierz Deyna, and Robert Gadocha for Poland (1974 World Cup)
- First players to play in a European Championship finals: Roger Guerreiro for Poland against Germany on 8 June 2008
- First player to play in the UEFA Nations League: Artur Jędrzejczyk for Poland against Portugal on 11 October 2018
- First player to play in the Africa Cup of Nations: Dickson Choto for Zimbabwe against Cameroon on 29 January 2004

== Managerial records ==
=== Appearances ===
As of matches played 31 August 2024

Rank	Manager	Nationality	Years	Total
1	Jan Urban	Poland	2007–10, 2012–13	204
2	Andrzej Strejlau	Poland	1975–79, 1988–89	199
3	Jaroslav Vejvoda	Czech Republic	1966–69, 1973–75	175
4	Kazimierz Górski	Poland	1960–62, 1981–82	139
5	Lucjan Brychczy	Poland	1972–73, 1979–80, 1987	124
6	Wacław Kuchar	Poland	1948, 1949–53	111
7	Paweł Janas	Poland	1994–1996	109
8	Jerzy Kopa	Poland	1982–85, 1998–99	108
9	Dragan Okuka	Serbia	2001-2003	99
10	Henning Berg	Norway	2014–2015	97

=== Average points ===
As of matches played 13 July 2025

Rank	Manager	Nationality	Years	Number of games	Total
1	Dean Klafurić	Croatia	2018	15	2.27
2	Paweł Janas	Poland	1994–1996	109	2.23
3	Józef Kałuża	Poland	1930	11	2.18
4	Dariusz Kubicki	Poland	1999, 2003–04	59	2.07
5	Stanislav Cherchesov	Russia	2015–16	35	2.14

== Club records ==
=== Matches ===
==== Firsts ====
- First matches of the Sport Team Legia were against the scout teams of Polish Legions in spring 1916, in Legionowo, Volhynia
- First recorded match: Divisional Sanitation Facility 0–7 Sport Team Legia, 1916, Legionowo, Volhynia
- First match in Warsaw: Polonia Warsaw 1–1 Legia, 29 April 1917, Agricola Park
- First match against non-Polish team: Viktoria Žižkov 9–2 WKS Legia, 31 March 1922
- First Polish Cup match: Pogoń Warsaw 0–7 WKS Legia Warsaw, 25 October 1925
- First top-flight match: Warszawianka Warsaw 1–4 WKS Legia Warsaw, 3 April 1927
- First match after the World War II: Syrena Warsaw 3–3 I WKS, 1 May 1945, Warsaw
- First European match: ŠK Slovan Bratislava 4–0 CWKS Legia Warsaw, 12 September 1956
- First Polish Super Cup match: Ruch Chorzów 0–3 WKS Legia Warsaw, 8 July 1989

==== Record wins ====
- Record league win: 12–0 against Wisła Kraków, 1956 Ekstraklasa, 19 August 1956
- Record Polish Cup win: 11–1 against Polonia Głubczyce, 1963–64 Polish Cup, 17 November 1963
- Record European win: 9–0 against Vikingur Reykjavik, 1972-73 UEFA Cup Winners' Cup, 27 September 1972
- Record win in UEFA Champions League: 8–0 UT Arad, 1969–70 European Cup, 1 October 1969
- Record UEFA Europa League win:
  - 6–0 TSV 1860 Munich, 1968–69 Inter-Cities Fairs Cup, 2 October 1968
  - 6–0 FC Tbilisi, 2004–05 UEFA Cup, 26 August 2004
- Record UEFA Conference League win:
  - 6–0 Caernarfon Town F.C., 2024–25 UEFA Conference League, 25 July 2024

Record defeats

- Record league defeat: 2–11 against Pogoń Lwów, 1927 Ekstraklasa, 3 September 1927
- Record European defeat: 0–6 Borussia Dortmund, 2016–17 UEFA Champions League, 14 September 2016

=== Record consecutive results ===
==== All competitions ====
- Record consecutive wins: 10 (March 18 – May 6, 1995)
- Record consecutive defeats: 7 (June 21 – October 11, 1936)
- Record consecutive league matches without a defeat: 25 (March 13 – August 6, 1994)
- Record consecutive matches without a win:
  - 11 (October 26 – December 14, 2025)
  - 10 (August 18 – October 30, 1966)
- Goalless streak: 6 (August 27 – October 9, 1966)
- Clean sheet streak: 7 (November 21, 1965 – April 13, 1966)
- Consecutive matches with at least one goal scored: 25 (November 23, 1996 – August 17, 1997)
- Consecutive matches with at least two goals scored: 12 (October 18 – December 8, 2024)
- Consecutive matches with at least one goal conceded: 19 (October 13, 1935 – October 11, 1936)
- Record consecutive home wins: 16 (May 20 – November 8, 1995)
- Record consecutive home defeats: 5 (August 6 – November 12, 1950)
- Record consecutive matches without a defeat at home: 36 (June 4, 1969 – May 30, 1971)
- Record consecutive matches without a win at home: 8 (June 10 – October 29, 1951)
- Record consecutive away wins: 7 (March 24 – July 26, 2014)
- Record consecutive away defeats: 9 (May 3, 1936 – March 21, 1948)
- Record consecutive matches without a defeat away: 18 (June 11, 1989 – April 4, 1990)
- Record consecutive matches without a win away: 12 (November 10, 1935 – March 21, 1948)

==== European cups ====
- Record consecutive wins: 6 (August 21 – November 6, 2014)
- Record consecutive defeats: 5 (September 19 – November 28, 2013)
- Record consecutive matches without a defeat: 10 (July 25 – November 28, 2024)
- Record consecutive matches without a win: 9 (July 31 – November 28, 2013)
- Record consecutive matches without a goal scored: 5 (November 1, 1995 – March 20, 1996)
- Record consecutive matches without a goal conceded: 7 (July 11 – August 22, 2019)
- Consecutive matches with at least one goal scored: 12 (July 2, 1977 – November 4, 1981)
- Consecutive matches with at least one goal conceded: 13 (October 21, 2021 – October 26, 2023)
- Record consecutive home wins: 5 (July 30 – December 11, 2014)
- Record consecutive home defeats: 3 (October 3 – November 28, 2013)
- Record consecutive matches without a defeat at home: 15 (October 1, 1969 – July 27, 1974)
- Record consecutive matches without a win at home: 6 (August 6 – November 28, 2013)
- Record consecutive away wins: 5 (August 1 – November 28, 2024)
- Record consecutive away defeats: 4 (September 28, 2016 – February 23, 2017)
- Record consecutive matches without a defeat away: 7 (August 24, 2017 – August 14, 2019)
- Record consecutive matches without a win away: 6 (July 27, 1977 – October 2, 1985)

=== Goals ===
- Most goals scored in a season: 106 – 2015–2016
- Most league goals scored in a season: 95 – 1995–1996
- Most goals scored in a Polish Cup season: 24 – 1952
- Most goals scored in a European cups season: 35 – 2024–2025

=== Points ===
- Most points in a season:
  - Three points for a win: 85 in 34 matches, 1995–1996
- Fewest points in a season:
  - Two points for a win: 8 in 18 matches, 1936
  - Three points for a win: 43 in 34 matches, 2021–2022

== Bibliography ==
- Hałys, Józef (1986). Polska piłka nożna [Polish Football] (in Polish).
