= Marian Cygan =

Polish football player and manager (1940–2026)

Personal information
- Full name: Marian Ludwik Cygan
- Date of birth: 30 July 1940
- Place of birth: Kraków, General Government (now Poland)
- Date of death: 11 April 2026 (aged 85)
- Place of death: Kraków, Poland
- Position: Goalkeeper

Youth career
- 1954–1958: Cracovia

Senior career*
Years	Team	Apps	(Gls)
1958–1959	Cracovia	2	(0)
1959–1961	Tarnovia Tarnów		
1961–1963	Wawel Kraków		
1963–1964	Tarnovia Tarnów		
1964–1965	Hutnik Kraków		

International career
1954	Poland U18		

Managerial career
- 1971: Hutnik Kraków
- 1983: Hutnik Kraków
- 1985–1986: Hutnik Kraków
- 1987–1988: Victoria Jaworzno
- 1988: Cracovia
- Lesser Poland
- * Club domestic league appearances and goals

Marian Cygan (30 June 1940 – 11 April 2026) was a Polish footballer and manager. Born and raised in Kraków, his playing career as a goalkeeper was cut short due to a serious injury aged 25. He went on to become a successful manager, most notably at his previous local clubs Cracovia and Hutnik, particularly at youth levels. Later, he became a prominent figure in the local and regional football associations, and was known for launching and developing the careers of many well-known professional football players.

== Playing career ==
Cygan was an academy graduate of Cracovia, having joined as a goalkeeper aged 14 after being spotted by Ignacy Książek on the Błonia fields in 1954. At Cracovia, he was the fourth-choice goalkeeper and only played two Ekstraklasa matches, against Szombierki Bytom and Polonia Bydgoszcz. Four years later, he was part of the Poland under-18 squad under Kazimierz Górski that went to the 1958 UEFA European Under-18 Championship in Luxembourg, where they finished third in the group stage.

He then briefly joined third-division club Tarnovia Tarnów. He fulfilled his mandatory military service at second-division army club Wawel Kraków, joining the paratroopers to avoid playing for Lublin-based army club Lublinianka; he made 4 parachute jumps. He then returned to Tarnovia. He joined Hutnik Kraków of Nowa Huta in 1964, a club he would be linked to for the majority of his working career. His playing career was cut short due to an injury, at 25 years of age. In February 1965, he was with the Hutnik team at a training camp in Cieplice. On the last day of the camp, in a match against Wisła Kraków, he lunged at Fryderyk Monica's feet and fell in a manner that caused him to lose a kidney, an injury that caused the end of his playing career.

== Managerial career ==
Due to his playing career being cut short abruptly and not wanting to quit football, Cygan focused all his energy on coaching. In total, he ended up dedicating over 46 years of his life to it. Staying at Hutnik Kraków, he completed an instructor’s course, then a second and first-class coaching course. He then assisted a string of first-team coaches: Adam Wapiennik, Władysław Giergiel, Jerzy Steckiw, Jerzy Pest, Aleksander Brożyniak, and Lucjan Franczak. He was head coach of Hutnik three times, in 1971, 1983 and 1985–86. The first time was in the autumn of 1971 and he led the team in the last six matches of the first round. A coach from Czechoslovakia was supposed to arrive instead, but the club president at the time Stefan Niziołek said Cygan would continue to lead the team.

In winter, he completed a month-long internship at Górnik Zabrze, which he travelled for two or three times a week. Antoni Brzeżańczyk, who had previously coached the Poland national team and later Feyenoord Rotterdam and Rapid Vienna, assigned Cygan tasks and making him lead the training sessions. At that time, the Górnik squad had well known players such as Włodzimierz Lubański, Zygfryd Szołtysik, Jerzy Gorgoń, and Stanisław Oślizło. After a month, Brzeżańczyk opined Cygan's work positively. In the spring round, Hutnik did not lose a single match under his leadership. Despite Cygan's success, he resigned from working with the first team and returned to youth coaching. He again worked with Hutnik’s senior team in the spring of 1983 and in the 1985–86 season.

In 1986, he moved to Cracovia, where he was a youth training coordinator and assisted Tadeusz Piotrowski with the first team. He himself was briefly head coach for two weeks as an interim manager after Piotrowski left in April 1988. He spent the next two years (1987–1988) at Victoria Jaworzno, where he brought Ryszard Czerwiec from the academy into the first team.

== Executive career ==
After ending his managerial career, he became a training coordinator for the Kraków Regional Football Association (KOZPN) and later for the Lesser Poland Regional Football Association (MOZPN). He worked for 21 years at the Kraków and Małopolska Football Associations. He played a major role in several Polish championship titles won by Lesser Poland teams in various age categories. He was known for finding very gifted players in small clubs and helping them develop, such as Krzysztof Bukalski, Mirosław Waligóra, Mateusz Klich, Bartosz Kapustka, Sławomir Peszko and Adam Buksa. In the Lesser Poland representative team, he coached, among others, Marcin Siedlarz and Paweł Nowak. He remained a member of the Lesser Poland Football Association’s Training Department, and served on the committee that grants coaching licenses.

== Personal life and death ==
Cygan was born in Kraków on 30 July 1940. In his youth, he qualified and worked as a metallurgical technician. He died in Kraków on 11 April 2026, at the age of 85.
