= 2008 Polish Super Cup =

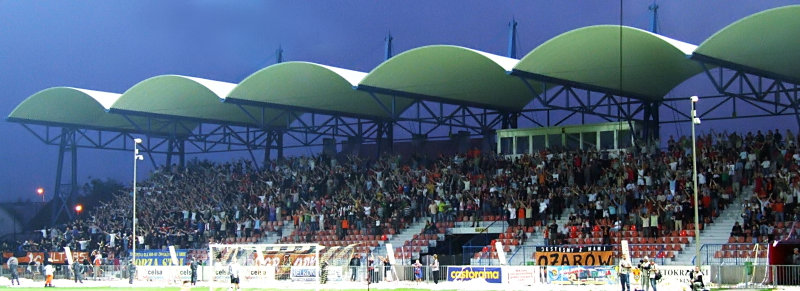
- The KSZO Municipal Sports Stadium in Ostrowiec Świętokrzyski hosted the final.
Wisła Kraków	Legia Warsaw
1	2
- Date: 20 July 2008
- Venue: KSZO Municipal Sports Stadium, Ostrowiec Świętokrzyski
- Referee: Tomasz Mikulski (Lubin)
- Attendance: 3,000

The 2008 Polish Super Cup, known then as the 2008 Ekstraklasa Super Cup, was held on 20 July 2008 between the 2007–08 Ekstraklasa winners Wisła Kraków and the 2007–08 Polish Cup winners Legia Warsaw. Legia Warsaw won the match 2–1, winning the trophy for the fourth time in their history.

== Match details ==
20 July 2008
19:15 CEST (UTC+02:00)

Wisła Kraków	1–2	Legia Warsaw
Kmiecik 15'	90minut Soccerway	Chinyama 13'; Rocki 87'

KSZO Municipal Sports Stadium, Ostrowiec Świętokrzyski
Attendance: 3,000
Referee: Tomasz Mikulski (Lubin)

Wisła Kraków:
GK	12	(Poland) Marcin Juszczyk
DF	25	(Brazil) Cléber	Yellow card
DF	24	(Poland) Mateusz Kowalski
DF	15	(Costa Rica) Júnior Díaz
DF	14	(Poland) Przemysław Szabat
MF	10	(Poland) Krzysztof Mączyński
MF	20	(Argentina) Mauro Cantoro
FW	19	(Poland) Patryk Małecki
FW	18	(Poland) Andrzej Niedzielan
FW	11	(Poland) Tomasz Dawidowski		(substituted off) 86'
FW	5	(Poland) Grzegorz Kmiecik	Yellow card
Substitutes:
DF	2	(Poland) Łukasz Burliga		(substituted on) 86'
Manager:
(Poland) Maciej Skorża

Legia Warsaw:
GK	82	(Slovakia) Ján Mucha
DF	4	(Zimbabwe) Dickson Choto
DF	25	(Poland) Jakub Rzeźniczak
DF	3	(Poland) Wojciech Szala
DF	11	(Poland) Tomasz Kiełbowicz
DF	24	(Poland) Jakub Wawrzyniak		(substituted off) 79'
MF	8	(Poland) Maciej Iwański
MF	14	(Serbia) Aleksandar Vuković	Yellow card	(substituted off) 69'
MF	22	(Poland) Piotr Rocki	Yellow card
FW	32	(Serbia) Miroslav Radović		(substituted off) 46'
FW	19	(Zimbabwe) Takesure Chinyama
Substitutes:
DF	31	(Poland) Maciej Rybus		(substituted on) 79'
MF	6	(Brazil) Roger Guerreiro		(substituted on) 69'
FW	20	(Poland) Sebastian Szałachowski		(substituted on) 46'
Manager:
(Poland) Jan Urban

== See also ==
- 2008–09 Ekstraklasa
- 2008–09 Polish Cup
