= 2001–02 I liga =

I liga
- Season: 2001–02
- Dates: 21 July 2001 – 5 May 2002
- Champions: Lech Poznań
- Promoted: Lech Poznań; Orlen Płock; Szczakowianka
- Relegated: Hutnik Kraków; Zagłębie Sosnowiec; Odra Opole; Włókniarz Kietrz; KS Myszków
- Matches: 380
- Goals: 906 (2.38 per match)
- Top goalscorer: Jacek Ziarkowski (22 goals)
- Biggest away win: Włókniarz 0–5 Polar (5 May 2002)
- Highest scoring: Polar 6–2 Hutnik (24 April 2002)
- Highest attendance: 20,000; Lech 1–0 Orlen (13 April 2002)
- Lowest attendance: 0 (Note: Matches have been played behind closed doors without any spectators.); Zagłębie 3–1 Tłoki (5 May 2002)
- Total attendance: 796,100
- Average attendance: 2,095 ▲0.5%

The 2001–02 I liga (then known as the II liga) is the 54th season of the I liga, the second highest division in the Polish football league system since its establishment in 1949. The league is operated by the Polish Football Association (PZPN). The league is contested by 20 teams who competing for promotion to the 2002–03 Ekstraklasa.

The regular season was played in a round-robin tournament. Each team played a total of 38 matches, half at home and half away. The champions and runners-up will receive automatic promotion while the 3rd- and 4th-placed teams will compete in Ekstraklasa's qualification play-offs. At the other end, the bottom six teams face automatic demotion to the II liga.

The season began on 21 July 2001, and concluded on 5 May 2002. After the 23rd matchday the league will be on winter break between 3 December 2001 and 1 March 2002.

== Teams ==
The following teams competed in the I liga 2001–02:

- Lech Poznań
- Orlen Płock
- Szczakowianka Jaworzno
- Górnik Łęczna
- GKS Bełchatów
- Ceramika Opoczno
- Hetman Zamość
- Ruch Radzionków
- Polar Wrocław
- Tłoki Gorzyce
- Arka Gdynia
- Górnik Polkowice
- Świt Nowy Dwór Mazowiecki
- ŁKS Łódź
- Jagiellonia Białystok
- Hutnik Kraków
- Zagłębie Sosnowiec
- Odra Opole
- Włókniarz Kietrz
- KS Myszków

== League table ==
Pos	Team	Pld	W	D	L	GF	GA	GD	Pts	Promotion or relegation
1	Lech Poznań (P)	38	26	10	2	64	18	+46	88	Promotion to Ekstraklasa
2	Orlen Płock (P)	38	20	13	5	50	24	+26	73	Promotion to Ekstraklasa
3	Szczakowianka Jaworzno (P)	38	20	6	12	61	50	+11	66	Qualification to play-offs
4	Górnik Łęczna	38	18	8	12	49	35	+14	62	Qualification to play-offs
5	GKS Bełchatów	38	16	10	12	55	46	+9	58	
6	Ceramika Opoczno	38	15	9	14	53	50	+3	54	
7	Hetman Zamość	38	12	15	11	47	43	+4	51	
8	Ruch Radzionków	38	14	8	16	52	51	+1	50 (Note: RRA: 6 pts,2-0-0, 3–0; PLR: 0 pts, 0-0-2, 0–3)	
9	Polar Wrocław	38	14	8	16	49	50	−1	50	
10	Tłoki Gorzyce	38	13	10	15	42	56	−14	49	
11	Arka Gdynia	38	10	18	10	39	41	−2	48 (Note: ARK: 2 pts,0-2-0, 2–2; GPK: 2 pts, 0-2-0, 2–2)	
12	Górnik Polkowice	38	11	15	12	34	35	−1	48	
13	Świt Nowy Dwór Mazowiecki	38	13	8	17	36	50	−14	47 (Note: ŚWI: 2 pts,0-2-0, 3–3; ŁKS: 2 pts, 0-2-0, 2–2)	
14	ŁKS Łódź	38	12	11	15	36	38	−2	47	
15	Jagiellonia Białystok (R)	38	11	12	15	41	41	0	45	Relegation to III liga
16	Hutnik Kraków (R)	38	12	8	18	48	61	−13	44	Relegation to III liga
17	Zagłębie Sosnowiec (R)	38	10	13	15	41	47	−6	43 (Note: ZSO: 4 pts,1-1-0, 3–1; OOP: 1 pt, 0-1-1, 1–3)	Relegation to III liga
18	Odra Opole (R)	38	12	5	21	40	61	−21	41	Relegation to III liga
19	Włókniarz Kietrz (R)	38	11	8	19	34	53	−19	41	Relegation to III liga
20	KS Myszków (R)	38	8	9	21	35	56	−21	33	Relegation to III liga

Source: 90minut.pl – II liga 2001/2002
Rules for classification: 1st points; 2nd head-to-head points; 3rd head-to-head goal difference; 4th head-to-head goals scored; 5th head-to-head away goals scored; 6th goal difference; 7th goals scored
(P) Promoted; (R) Relegated

== Results ==
Home \ Away	LPO	ORL	SZJ	GKŁ	BEŁ	CER	HET	RRA	PLR	TŁK	ARK	GPK	ŚWI	ŁKS	JAG	HUT	ZSO	OOP	WŁK	MYS
Lech Poznań		1–0	4–0	1–0	2–1	2–0	3–0	1–0	5–2	3–0	2–0	2–0	1–1	3–1	1–0	2–1	2–1	1–0	2–0	2–0
Orlen Płock	0–0		2–1	1–2	1–1	2–0	2–1	3–1	3–0	2–0	0–0	0–0	1–0	4–0	1–0	2–0	0–0	2–0	1–1	2–1
Szczakowianka Jaworzno	0–0	0–0		4–1	3–1	4–0	2–1	3–2	1–0	2–0	3–1	1–0	4–1	1–0	1–0	2–1	1–1	3–0	1–0	4–1
Górnik Łęczna	0–1	3–0	2–3		2–2	1–0	0–0	3–2	1–1	0–0	1–1	1–0	1–0	1–0	3–0	2–0	2–1	1–0	3–0	4–0
GKS Bełchatów	0–0	3–2	3–1	3–1		1–4	2–2	1–2	0–0	0–3	3–1	2–0	2–0	1–0	2–1	2–0	1–1	4–1	2–0	2–0
Ceramika Opoczno	1–1	1–1	2–1	0–2	2–1		2–1	1–1	3–0	4–0	0–2	0–3	2–0	0–1	1–0	5–2	1–1	5–2	3–0	2–1
Hetman Zamość	0–2	1–2	1–0	1–0	4–1	1–1		3–2	1–1	0–0	2–0	4–0	2–0	0–0	0–0	1–1	2–0	4–1	1–0	2–0
Ruch Radzionków	0–0	1–2	1–1	1–0	0–0	1–2	2–1		1–0	2–3	2–2	0–2	3–1	2–0	1–0	2–3	3–1	2–0	2–0	0–2
Polar Wrocław	0–1	2–0	1–3	1–3	1–2	3–1	1–1	0–2		2–0	0–0	1–2	1–0	2–0	2–2	6–2	0–1	2–1	1–2	1–0
Tłoki Gorzyce	0–4	1–1	1–0	1–4	3–1	0–1	2–2	2–4	0–3		2–1	1–1	0–1	1–0	2–0	2–0	1–1	3–3	1–0	2–1
Arka Gdynia	1–1	1–2	1–1	1–1	1–0	1–0	2–2	0–0	3–1	2–1		0–0	1–1	0–0	1–0	2–3	2–0	1–0	3–0	1–1
Górnik Polkowice	0–0	0–1	2–1	0–1	0–0	1–1	1–1	1–0	1–1	0–0	2–2		2–0	0–0	0–0	0–2	1–0	2–0	3–1	2–0
Świt Nowy Dwór Mazowiecki	1–3	0–2	3–1	1–0	2–1	2–1	0–0	2–1	1–1	1–3	3–1	1–1		1–1	2–1	2–1	1–0	0–1	0–1	1–0
ŁKS Łódź	2–1	0–0	4–0	0–0	1–0	4–1	2–1	1–1	0–2	1–0	1–0	1–1	2–2		2–1	0–1	1–1	4–0	2–1	1–3
Jagiellonia Białystok	1–1	1–3	3–1	1–0	0–2	1–0	1–2	1–1	4–0	1–1	0–0	3–1	4–2	2–0		2–0	2–2	3–1	1–0	0–0
Hutnik Kraków	1–2	0–0	1–2	1–0	0–1	1–2	2–0	0–2	2–0	2–0	1–1	3–2	1–1	1–1	1–1		3–1	4–3	0–0	1–1
Zagłębie Sosnowiec	2–4	0–0	5–1	1–1	2–2	1–1	0–0	3–0	1–2	3–1	0–0	1–0	0–1	0–3	1–0	2–1		1–0	2–1	2–1
Odra Opole	1–0	0–2	1–0	2–0	0–4	0–0	3–0	1–2	0–1	1–2	3–0	2–2	1–0	1–0	1–1	2–0	3–2		1–1	2–1
Włókniarz Kietrz	1–1	1–1	2–2	3–0	2–0	3–2	3–0	2–1	0–5	1–2	1–2	1–0	0–1	1–0	0–0	2–4	1–0	0–2		2–1
KS Myszków	0–2	0–2	1–2	1–2	1–1	1–1	2–2	3–2	0–2	1–1	1–1	0–2	2–0	1–0	2–3	3–1	1–0	1–0	0–0	

Source: 90minut.pl – II liga 2001/2002
Legend: Blue = home team win; Yellow = draw; Red = away team win.

== Top goalscorers ==
Rank	Player	Club	Goals
1	(Poland) Jacek Ziarkowski	Hetman Zamość	21
2	(Poland) Piotr Żaba	Ruch Radzionków	19
3	(Poland) Adam Grad	ŁKS Łódź / Jagiellonia Białystok	17

== Ekstraklasa qualification play-offs ==
Team 1	Agg.	Team 2	1st leg	2nd leg
Szczakowianka Jaworzno	2–1	RKS Radomsko (14E)	2–0	0–1
Górnik Łęczna	1–3	KSZO Ostrowiec Świętokrzyski (13E)	0–1	1–2

Source: 90minut.pl – Baraże o udział w I lidze (in Polish)
