= Andrzej Sermak =

Polish footballer

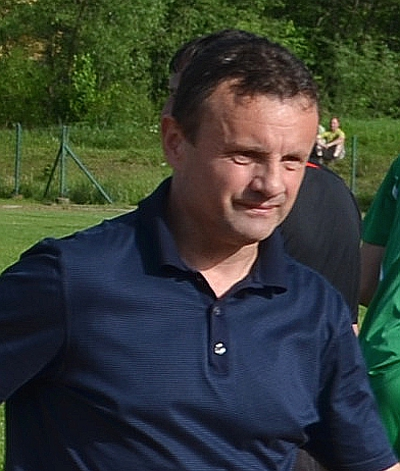

Personal information
- Date of birth: 29 November 1962 (age 63)
- Place of birth: Libiąż, Poland
- Height: 1.75 m (5 ft 9 in)
- Position: Midfielder

Team information
- Current team: LKS Palczowice; Korona Skawinki (manager)
- Number: 4

Senior career*
Years	Team	Apps	(Gls)
1979–1980	LZS Gromiec		
1980–1981	Górnik Libiąż		
1982–1984	Victoria Jaworzno		
1985	Ruch Chorzów	5	(0)
1985–1988	Victoria Jaworzno		
1988–1994	Hutnik Kraków		
1994–1995	GKS Katowice	18	(2)
1995–1998	Górnik/Janina Libiąż		
1998–1999	RKS Radomsko		
1999–2003	Szczakowianka Jaworzno		
2004–2005	Orzeł Balin		
2006	Garbarz Zembrzyce		
2006–2007	Szczakowianka Jaworzno		
2007–2008	KP Jaworzno		
2008	Szczakowianka Jaworzno		
2009	Soła Oświęcim		
2009	Nadwiślanin Gromiec		
2011	LKS Żarki		
2012	Korona Mętków		
2012–2013	Jałowiec Stryszawa		
2014–2015	Wisła Jankowice		
2017	LKS Gorzów		
2018	LKS Bobrek	5	(0)
2020	Błyskawica Marcówka	5	(1)
2021	Zaskawianka Zaskawie	10	(0)
2024–	LKS Palczowice	0	(0)

Managerial career
- 1999–2002: Szczakowianka Jaworzno (player-manager)
- 2003–2004: Szczakowianka Jaworzno II
- 2004–2005: Orzeł Balin (player-manager)
- 2006: Garbarz Zembrzyce (player-manager)
- 2006–2007: Szczakowianka Jaworzno
- 2007–2012: JSP Szczakowianka Jaworzno
- 2007–2012: Jałowiec Stryszawa (player-manager)
- 2013–2017: Szczakowianka Jaworzno
- 2017: LKS Gorzów (player-manager)
- 2017: Halniak Maków Podhalański
- 2018: Naroże Juszczyn
- 2019: Victoria Zalas
- 2019–2020: Błyskawica Marcówka (player-manager)
- 2021: Zaskawianka Zaskawie (player-manager)
- 2021–: Korona Skawinki
- * Club domestic league appearances and goals as of 13 October 2024

Andrzej Sermak (born 29 November 1962) is a Polish manager and player who plays as a midfielder for LKS Palczowice. He is also in charge of Korona Skawinki.
