= Branko Rašić =

Serbian football manager and player

Personal information
- Full name: Branko Rašić
- Date of birth: 13 February 1977 (age 49)
- Place of birth: Prokuplje, SR Serbia, SFR Yugoslavia
- Height: 1.81 m (5 ft 11 in)
- Position: Midfielder

Youth career
- Red Star Belgrade

Senior career*
| Years | Team | Apps | (Gls) |
| 1994 | Red Star Belgrade | 1 | (0) |
| 1995–1996 | Obilić | 29 | (5) |
| 1996 | Budućnost Valjevo | 10 | (4) |
| 1997–1998 | OFK Beograd | 27 | (1) |
| 2001 | Halcones de Querétaro | | |
| 2002 | Szczakowianka Jaworzno | | |
| 2002 | Hetman Zamość | 6 | (1) |
| 2003 | Kryvbas Kryvyi Rih | 0 | (0) |
| 2004 | Świt Nowy Dwór Mazowiecki | 11 | (4) |
| 2004 | Kujawiak Włocławek | 16 | (2) |
| 2005 | Unia Janikowo | | |
| 2006 | Victoria Jaworzno | | |
| 2006–2007 | Unia Janikowo | 23 | (5) |
| 2008 | Mieszko Gniezno | 14 | (3) |

Managerial career
- 2014–2015: Radnički Obrenovac
- 2022: Krtinska
- * Club domestic league appearances and goals

Branko Rašić (Serbian Cyrillic: Бранко Рашић; born 13 February 1977) is a Serbian football manager and former player.

== Playing career ==
After coming through the youth system of Red Star Belgrade, Rašić made his senior debut for the club in the 1993–94 season. He later spent most of his career in Poland playing for seven clubs, mostly in the lower leagues.

== Managerial career ==
Rašić was manager of Serbian League Belgrade club Radnički Obrenovac in the 2014–15 season.
