= 1991–92 Ekstraklasa =

65th season of top-tier football league in Poland

Liga
- Season: 1991–92
- Champions: Lech Poznań (4th title)
- Relegated: Motor Lublin; Stal Stalowa Wola; Zagłębie Sosnowiec; Igloopol Dębica
- Matches: 306
- Goals: 678 (2.22 per match)
- Top goalscorer: Jerzy Podbrożny; Mirosław Waligóra (20 goals)
- Average attendance: 4,778 ▲6.8%

Statistics of the Ekstraklasa for the 1991–92 season.

== Overview ==
It was contested by 18 teams, and Lech Poznań won the championship.

== League table ==
| Pos | Team | Pld | W | D | L | GF | GA | GD | Pts | Qualification or relegation |
|---|---|---|---|---|---|---|---|---|---|---|
| 1 | Lech Poznań (C) | 34 | 19 | 11 | 4 | 66 | 38 | +28 | 49 | Qualification to Champions League first round |
| 2 | GKS Katowice | 34 | 16 | 12 | 6 | 51 | 29 | +22 | 44 | Qualification to UEFA Cup first round |
| 3 | Widzew Łódź | 34 | 17 | 9 | 8 | 48 | 28 | +20 | 43 | Qualification to UEFA Cup first round |
| 4 | Górnik Zabrze | 34 | 14 | 15 | 5 | 43 | 26 | +17 | 43 | |
| 5 | Ruch Chorzów | 34 | 13 | 13 | 8 | 43 | 38 | +5 | 39 | |
| 6 | Śląsk Wrocław | 34 | 15 | 8 | 11 | 42 | 35 | +7 | 38 | |
| 7 | Wisła Kraków | 34 | 10 | 14 | 10 | 39 | 35 | +4 | 34 | |
| 8 | Zawisza Bydgoszcz | 34 | 11 | 12 | 11 | 43 | 42 | +1 | 34 | |
| 9 | Zagłębie Lubin | 34 | 12 | 10 | 12 | 30 | 31 | −1 | 34 | |
| 10 | Legia Warsaw | 34 | 11 | 11 | 12 | 34 | 33 | +1 | 33 | |
| 11 | ŁKS Łódź | 34 | 9 | 15 | 10 | 26 | 29 | −3 | 33 | |
| 12 | Hutnik Kraków | 34 | 9 | 14 | 11 | 54 | 46 | +8 | 32 | |
| 13 | Stal Mielec | 34 | 8 | 16 | 10 | 27 | 28 | −1 | 32 | |
| 14 | Olimpia Poznań | 34 | 8 | 15 | 11 | 34 | 41 | −7 | 31 | |
| 15 | Motor Lublin (R) | 34 | 9 | 12 | 13 | 33 | 40 | −7 | 30 | Relegated to II liga |
| 16 | Stal Stalowa Wola (R) | 34 | 8 | 12 | 14 | 23 | 33 | −10 | 28 | Relegated to II liga |
| 17 | Zagłębie Sosnowiec (R) | 34 | 6 | 12 | 16 | 28 | 50 | −22 | 24 | Relegated to II liga |
| 18 | Igloopol Dębica (R) | 34 | 2 | 7 | 25 | 15 | 76 | −61 | 11 | Relegated to II liga |

Source: 90minut.pl (in Polish)
(C) Champions; (R) Relegated

== Results ==
| Home \ Away | KAT | GÓR | HUT | IGL | LPO | LEG | ŁKS | MOL | OLP | RUC | STA | SSW | ŚLĄ | WID | WIS | ZLU | ZSO | ZAW |
|---|---|---|---|---|---|---|---|---|---|---|---|---|---|---|---|---|---|---|
| GKS Katowice | | 1–1 | 2–1 | 1–0 | 3–1 | 4–2 | 2–1 | 2–2 | 3–0 | 1–1 | 0–0 | 3–0 | 1–1 | 1–0 | 0–0 | 0–1 | 5–0 | 1–0 |
| Górnik Zabrze | 2–2 | | 2–0 | 5–1 | 2–2 | 1–0 | 2–3 | 0–0 | 0–0 | 4–2 | 1–1 | 2–1 | 3–0 | 1–0 | 1–0 | 2–0 | 0–0 | 0–0 |
| Hutnik Kraków | 3–0 | 1–2 | | 6–0 | 2–2 | 1–2 | 2–1 | 1–2 | 0–0 | 3–3 | 3–0 | 1–1 | 1–1 | 2–0 | 0–1 | 0–1 | 2–1 | 2–1 |
| Igloopol Dębica | 0–3 | 0–0 | 0–2 | | 0–4 | 1–0 | 1–2 | 1–0 | 1–2 | 0–3 | 0–0 | 0–4 | 0–3 | 1–2 | 0–4 | 0–0 | 0–2 | 0–1 |
| Lech Poznań | 1–0 | 1–1 | 3–2 | 3–0 | | 1–0 | 4–0 | 1–0 | 1–1 | 1–1 | 3–0 | 3–0 | 2–1 | 3–3 | 1–1 | 1–0 | 5–1 | 2–0 |
| Legia Warsaw | 0–2 | 0–0 | 0–2 | 5–2 | 2–0 | | 1–0 | 1–0 | 1–0 | 1–1 | 1–2 | 1–2 | 0–2 | 1–0 | 1–1 | 0–0 | 3–0 | 2–0 |
| ŁKS Łódź | 0–0 | 0–0 | 0–0 | 0–0 | 1–1 | 1–0 | | 2–0 | 0–1 | 2–1 | 0–0 | 0–0 | 1–1 | 2–0 | 0–0 | 0–1 | 0–0 | 3–4 |
| Motor Lublin | 0–2 | 0–0 | 2–2 | 1–1 | 1–1 | 0–3 | 2–1 | | 1–1 | 2–1 | 0–1 | 0–1 | 3–0 | 1–2 | 3–0 | 2–0 | 1–1 | 0–0 |
| Olimpia Poznań | 1–2 | 1–2 | 3–3 | 3–2 | 1–2 | 1–1 | 2–0 | 0–0 | | 0–0 | 1–1 | 1–1 | 1–1 | 0–0 | 1–2 | 2–1 | 3–2 | 1–0 |
| Ruch Chorzów | 1–1 | 1–0 | 1–1 | 1–0 | 3–1 | 0–0 | 1–0 | 5–0 | 2–1 | | 2–0 | 2–0 | 0–0 | 1–0 | 1–4 | 1–2 | 2–1 | 1–0 |
| Stal Mielec | 0–0 | 2–0 | 1–1 | 3–0 | 0–1 | 0–0 | 0–0 | 2–1 | 1–1 | 0–0 | | 3–0 | 0–0 | 0–1 | 3–0 | 0–1 | 1–1 | 4–1 |
| Stal Stalowa Wola | 1–0 | 0–0 | 1–1 | 2–0 | 1–2 | 0–0 | 0–1 | 0–1 | 0–0 | 0–0 | 1–1 | | 2–0 | 0–0 | 0–2 | 2–1 | 0–1 | 0–0 |
| Śląsk Wrocław | 2–1 | 1–2 | 3–2 | 3–0 | 1–2 | 0–1 | 1–1 | 1–3 | 1–0 | 3–0 | 2–0 | 2–0 | | 1–3 | 1–0 | 0–0 | 1–0 | 3–1 |
| Widzew Łódź | 2–0 | 1–0 | 3–3 | 5–0 | 2–2 | 3–0 | 1–1 | 3–0 | 3–0 | 4–0 | 2–1 | 1–0 | 0–1 | | 3–2 | 1–0 | 1–1 | 0–0 |
| Wisła Kraków | 2–4 | 3–3 | 1–1 | 0–0 | 0–2 | 2–2 | 0–1 | 0–0 | 1–1 | 3–0 | 2–0 | 0–0 | 0–1 | 0–0 | | 2–1 | 2–0 | 2–1 |
| Zagłębie Lubin | 1–1 | 1–2 | 1–0 | 2–1 | 2–4 | 1–0 | 0–0 | 2–0 | 2–0 | 1–1 | 0–0 | 0–1 | 2–1 | 0–1 | 1–1 | | 2–1 | 1–1 |
| Zagłębie Sosnowiec | 0–0 | 0–2 | 2–2 | 0–0 | 4–1 | 1–1 | 0–1 | 2–5 | 1–3 | 0–2 | 0–0 | 2–1 | 2–0 | 0–1 | 1–0 | 1–1 | | 0–0 |
| Zawisza Bydgoszcz | 2–3 | 1–0 | 3–1 | 4–2 | 2–2 | 2–2 | 1–1 | 0–0 | 3–1 | 2–2 | 2–0 | 2–1 | 1–3 | 3–0 | 1–1 | 2–1 | 2–0 | |

Source: 90minut.pl (in Polish)
Legend: Blue = home team win; Yellow = draw; Red = away team win.

== Top goalscorers ==
| Rank | Player | Club | Goals |
|---|---|---|---|
| 1 | (Poland) Mirosław Waligóra | Hutnik Kraków | 20 |
| 1 | (Poland) Jerzy Podbrożny | Lech Poznań | 20 |
| 3 | (Poland) Mirosław Trzeciak | Lech Poznań | 14 |
| 4 | (Poland) Krzysztof Walczak | GKS Katowice | 13 |
| 5 | (Poland) Andrzej Sermak | Hutnik Kraków | 12 |
| 6 | (Poland) Wojciech Kowalczyk | Legia Warsaw | 11 |
| 6 | (Poland) Andrzej Juskowiak | Lech Poznań | 11 |
| 8 | (Georgia (country)) Gija Guruli | GKS Katowice | 10 |
| 8 | (Poland) Dariusz Sajdak | Stal Stalowa Wola | 10 |
| 8 | (Poland) Dariusz Skrzypczak | Lech Poznań | 10 |

== Attendances ==
| No. | Club | Average |
|---|---|---|
| 1 | Lech Poznań | 10,199 |
| 2 | Widzew Łódź | 8,114 |
| 3 | Wisła Kraków | 7,562 |
| 4 | Stal Stalowa Wola | 6,588 |
| 5 | Śląsk Wrocław | 5,391 |
| 6 | Górnik Zabrze | 5,319 |
| 7 | Stal Mielec | 4,845 |
| 8 | Zawisza Bydgoszcz | 4,564 |
| 9 | Legia Warszawa | 4,265 |
| 10 | Hutnik Kraków | 4,118 |
| 11 | Zagłębie Sosnowiec | 3,735 |
| 12 | Ruch Chorzów | 3,727 |
| 13 | Zagłębie Lubin | 3,668 |
| 14 | Motor Lublin | 3,294 |
| 15 | GKS Katowice | 3,177 |
| 16 | ŁKS | 3,176 |
| 17 | Olimpia Poznań | 2,706 |
| 18 | Igloopol Dębica | 1,550 |
