= 2002–03 Ekstraklasa =

77th season of top-tier football league in Poland

Liga
- Season: 2002–03
- Champions: Wisła Kraków; 9th Ekstraklasa title 8th Polish title
- Relegated: Zagłębie Lubin; Szczakowianka Jaworzno; Ruch Chorzów; KSZO Ostrowiec Świętokrzyski; Pogoń Szczecin
- Top goalscorer: Stanko Svitlica (24 goals)
- Average attendance: 5,142 ▲26.1%

The 2002–03 Ekstraklasa is the 77th season of the Polish Football Championship and the 69th season of the Ekstraklasa, the top Polish professional league for association football clubs, since its establishment in 1927.

== Overview ==
16 teams competed in the 2002-03 season. Wisła Kraków won the championship.

== League table ==
| Pos | Team | Pld | W | D | L | GF | GA | GD | Pts | Qualification or relegation |
|---|---|---|---|---|---|---|---|---|---|---|
| 1 | Wisła Kraków (C) | 30 | 21 | 5 | 4 | 75 | 28 | +47 | 68 | Qualification to Champions League second qualifying round |
| 2 | Dyskobolia Grodzisk Wielkopolski | 30 | 18 | 8 | 4 | 56 | 26 | +30 | 62 | Qualification to UEFA Cup qualifying round |
| 3 | Dospel Katowice | 30 | 19 | 4 | 7 | 39 | 21 | +18 | 61 | Qualification to UEFA Cup qualifying round |
| 4 | Legia Warsaw | 30 | 17 | 9 | 4 | 61 | 29 | +32 | 60 | |
| 5 | Odra Wodzisław | 30 | 17 | 5 | 8 | 55 | 42 | +13 | 56 | Qualification to Intertoto Cup first round |
| 6 | Amica Wronki | 30 | 11 | 10 | 9 | 43 | 34 | +9 | 43 | |
| 7 | Górnik Zabrze | 30 | 10 | 11 | 9 | 46 | 32 | +14 | 41 | |
| 8 | Polonia Warsaw | 30 | 11 | 8 | 11 | 37 | 45 | −8 | 41 | Qualification to Intertoto Cup first round |
| 9 | Widzew Łódź | 30 | 10 | 7 | 13 | 29 | 39 | −10 | 37 | |
| 10 | Wisła Płock | 30 | 10 | 7 | 13 | 29 | 38 | −9 | 37 | Qualification to UEFA Cup qualifying round |
| 11 | Lech Poznań | 30 | 8 | 11 | 11 | 41 | 38 | +3 | 35 | |
| 12 | Zagłębie Lubin (R) | 30 | 8 | 8 | 14 | 34 | 44 | −10 | 32 | Qualification to relegation playoffs |
| 13 | Szczakowianka Jaworzno (R) | 30 | 8 | 8 | 14 | 40 | 54 | −14 | 32 | Qualification to relegation playoffs |
| 14 | Ruch Chorzów (R) | 30 | 7 | 11 | 12 | 29 | 39 | −10 | 32 | Relegated to II liga |
| 15 | KSZO Ostrowiec Świętokrzyski (R) | 30 | 4 | 3 | 23 | 21 | 63 | −42 | 15 | Relegated to II liga |
| 16 | Pogoń Szczecin (R) | 30 | 2 | 3 | 25 | 14 | 77 | −63 | 9 | Relegated to II liga |

Source: 90minut.pl (in Polish)
(C) Champions; (R) Relegated

== Results ==
| Home \ Away | AMC | KAT | KSZ | RUC | GÓR | DSK | LPO | LEG | ODR | POG | PWA | WID | WIS | WPK | ZLU | SZJ |
|---|---|---|---|---|---|---|---|---|---|---|---|---|---|---|---|---|
| Amica Wronki | | 0–1 | 5–1 | 2–1 | 2–1 | 0–1 | 2–1 | 1–1 | 0–2 | 2–0 | 1–3 | 1–0 | 1–1 | 2–2 | 2–2 | 1–2 |
| GKS Katowice | 1–1 | | 2–1 | 1–0 | 2–0 | 0–1 | 1–0 | 1–2 | 2–1 | 2–0 | 2–1 | 1–0 | 1–0 | 2–0 | 1–0 | 4–0 |
| KSZO Ostrowiec | 0–2 | 0–3 | | 0–2 | 1–2 | 1–3 | 1–3 | 1–1 | 2–1 | 0–1 | 2–1 | 0–0 | 0–1 | 0–2 | 1–0 | 3–1 |
| Ruch Chorzów | 1–0 | 2–0 | 1–1 | | 0–0 | 1–1 | 1–0 | 1–0 | 0–1 | 3–0 | 0–0 | 1–2 | 0–3 | 0–0 | 3–0 | 1–1 |
| Górnik Zabrze | 1–0 | 1–3 | 2–0 | 0–0 | | 0–0 | 0–0 | 2–3 | 4–0 | 9–0 | 0–0 | 4–0 | 1–2 | 1–2 | 3–2 | 3–0 |
| Dyskobolia | 1–2 | 0–2 | 1–0 | 1–1 | 2–2 | | 4–1 | 3–3 | 3–0 | 2–0 | 2–0 | 1–1 | 2–0 | 1–0 | 4–0 | 5–0 |
| Lech Poznań | 0–0 | 0–1 | 2–0 | 0–0 | 3–1 | 2–3 | | 0–0 | 2–3 | 6–0 | 4–1 | 2–1 | 2–4 | 2–2 | 0–0 | 2–2 |
| Legia Warsaw | 4–3 | 3–0 | 6–0 | 3–3 | 0–0 | 0–2 | 2–0 | | 0–0 | 0–0 | 4–1 | 2–0 | 3–2 | 1–0 | 3–1 | 2–1 |
| Odra Wodzisław | 0–3 | 0–3 | 2–1 | 1–1 | 1–3 | 3–1 | 2–1 | 2–1 | | 3–1 | 2–2 | 5–1 | 3–2 | 2–0 | 3–0 | 4–0 |
| Pogoń Szczecin | 0–4 | 0–0 | 4–1 | 0–3 | 1–3 | 1–2 | 0–1 | 0–4 | 1–7 | | 0–2 | 0–1 | 0–1 | 1–4 | 0–1 | 0–1 |
| Polonia Warsaw | 2–0 | 1–1 | 2–1 | 2–1 | 1–1 | 1–1 | 0–0 | 0–1 | 2–2 | 2–1 | | 1–0 | 0–4 | 3–1 | 2–1 | 2–1 |
| Widzew Łódź | 1–1 | 2–0 | 2–1 | 2–0 | 1–0 | 0–2 | 2–2 | 1–3 | 0–0 | 1–1 | 3–2 | | 2–3 | 1–0 | 2–0 | 1–0 |
| Wisła Kraków | 1–1 | 2–0 | 4–1 | 5–2 | 4–0 | 1–1 | 3–2 | 2–1 | 4–0 | 3–0 | 2–0 | 1–0 | | 4–0 | 4–1 | 2–2 |
| Wisła Płock | 0–1 | 1–1 | 2–0 | 2–0 | 0–0 | 1–0 | 0–0 | 0–2 | 0–1 | 2–1 | 0–1 | 3–2 | 0–3 | | 2–0 | 2–1 |
| Zagłębie Lubin | 1–1 | 2–0 | 2–0 | 2–1 | 1–1 | 1–2 | 1–1 | 1–3 | 0–1 | 5–0 | 3–1 | 0–0 | 1–4 | 1–1 | | 0–0 |
| Szczakowianka Jaworzno | 2–2 | 0–1 | 3–1 | 6–2 | 1–1 | 2–4 | 1–2 | 1–1 | 2–3 | 2–1 | 3–1 | 1–0 | 1–1 | 2–0 | 1–2 | |

Source: 90minut.pl (in Polish)
Legend: Blue = home team win; Yellow = draw; Red = away team win.

== Relegation playoffs ==
The matches were played on 14, 15, 21 and 22 June 2003.

| Team 1 | Agg. | Team 2 | 1st leg | 2nd leg |
|---|---|---|---|---|
| Górnik Łęczna | 3–1 | Zagłębie Lubin | 1–0 | 2–1 |
| Świt Nowy Dwór Mazowiecki | 4–0 | Szczakowianka Jaworzno | 1–0 | 3–0 |

== Top goalscorers ==
| Rank | Player | Club | Goals |
|---|---|---|---|
| 1 | (Serbia and Montenegro) Stanko Svitlica | Legia Warsaw | 24 |
| 2 | (Poland) Maciej Żurawski | Wisła Kraków | 22 |
| 3 | (Poland) Marcin Kuźba | Wisła Kraków | 21 |
| 3 | (Poland) Andrzej Niedzielan | Górnik Zabrze / Dyskobolia Grodzisk | 21 |
| 5 | (Poland) Jacek Ziarkowski | Odra Wodzisław | 14 |
| 6 | (Poland) Michał Chałbiński | Odra Wodzisław | 13 |
| 7 | (Poland) Tomasz Dawidowski | Amica Wronki | 12 |
| 7 | (Poland) Krzysztof Gajtkowski | GKS Katowice / Lech Poznań | 12 |
| 9 | (Poland) Grzegorz Rasiak | Dyskobolia Grodzisk | 10 |
| 9 | (Poland) Marek Saganowski | Legia Warsaw | 10 |

== Attendances ==
| No. | Club | Average |
|---|---|---|
| 1 | Lech Poznań | 15,133 |
| 2 | Wisła Kraków | 8,300 |
| 3 | Legia Warszawa | 7,900 |
| 4 | Widzew Łódź | 7,500 |
| 5 | Ostrowiec Świętokrzyski | 5,233 |
| 6 | Wisła Płock | 5,067 |
| 7 | Górnik Zabrze | 4,967 |
| 8 | Katowice | 4,400 |
| 9 | Szczakowianka Jaworzno | 4,333 |
| 10 | Dyskobolia | 3,887 |
| 11 | Odra Wodzisław Śląski | 3,467 |
| 12 | Ruch Chorzów | 3,071 |
| 13 | Zagłębie Lubin | 2,733 |
| 14 | Polonia Warszawa | 2,367 |
| 15 | Pogoń Szczecin | 2,040 |
| 16 | Amica Wronki | 1,743 |
