= Aleksander Januszkiewicz =

Polish association football player

Personal information
- Date of birth: 7 January 1994 (age 32)
- Place of birth: Świętochłowice, Poland
- Height: 1.83 m (6 ft 0 in)
- Position: Midfielder

Team information
- Current team: Victoria Jaworzno
- Number: 30

Youth career
- –2007: MSPN Górnik Zabrze
- 2007–2008: MOSM Tychy
- 2008–2011: Gwarek Zabrze

Senior career*
| Years | Team | Apps | (Gls) |
| 2011–2013 | Gwarek Zabrze | | |
| 2013–2016 | GKS Katowice | 32 | (1) |
| 2016–2017 | Polonia Bytom | 25 | (4) |
| 2017–2018 | Gwardia Koszalin | 30 | (1) |
| 2018 | Stal Brzeg | 14 | (2) |
| 2018 | Lynx FC | 4 | (1) |
| 2019 | Assyriska FF | | |
| 2020–2025 | Sparta Katowice | 110 | (37) |
| 2025– | Victoria Jaworzno | 21 | (14) |
- * Club domestic league appearances and goals as of 15:16, 13 June 2025 (UTC)

Aleksander Januszkiewicz (born 7 January 1994) is a Polish professional footballer who plays as a midfielder for IV liga Lesser Poland club Victoria Jaworzno.

== Honours ==
Gwardia Koszalin

- III liga, group I: 2016–17

Sparta Katowice

- IV liga Silesia: 2024–25
- Regional league Silesia IV: 2022–23

Victoria Jaworzno

- V liga Lesser Poland West: 2025–26
