= Trzaskowski (surname) =

Trzaskowski (pronounced [tʂaˈskɔfskʲi]; feminine: Trzaskowska) is a Polish-language surname. Notable people with the surname include:

- Andrzej Trzaskowski (1933–1998), Polish musician
- Antoni Trzaskowski (1941–2025), Polish footballer
- Rafał Trzaskowski (born 1972), Polish politician
