= List of derbies in Poland =

This is a list of the main sporting local derbies in Poland.

Many sports teams in Poland have organised supporter groups who are actively in involved in either the ultras scene or the hooligan scene. All these groups in Poland have 4 types of relationships between each other which are subject to change over time:

- friendships (zgody) - alliances between two groups of supporters, whereby fans frequently visit each other's matches. During matches between two such sides, there usually are no divisions between away and home fans but both sets of fans are in the same stand.
- agreements (układy) - provisional agreements of co-operation between two groups of fans. If they last, they usually become friendships later on.
- enemies (kosy) - rival teams. A rival of a friend is also usually considered to be a rival.
- neutral - there's no specific antipathy or sympathy towards each other.

These relationships can be complicated. However, local derbies are usually pre-determined by historical and geographical factors and it is very rare for a local derby not to be considered a fierce rivalry. In some cases, the rivalries extend beyond sport and are general rivalries between cities or towns.

== Association football ==
=== Biggest inter-regional rivalries ===
==== Football Derby of Poland ====
Any match where Legia Warsaw plays either Lech Poznań, Widzew Łódź or Wisła Kraków. All four clubs are among the most supported in the country and usually are or were among the title contenders. The animosity towards Legia stems from the fact that during the communist rule Legia forced players to transfer to their club by enforcing an ultimatum of either playing for Legia or serving in the military.

==== Silesia vs. The capital ====
Górnik Zabrze, Ruch Chorzów or Polonia Bytom vs. Legia Warsaw or Polonia Warsaw - the rivalry is not limited to those clubs, as such a derby can refer to any team from the capital, Legia, Polonia or even Hutnik or smaller teams, against any Upper Silesian club such as: GKS Tychy, GKS Jastrzębie, Górnik Zabrze, Odra Wodzisław, Piast Gliwice, Polonia Bytom, ROW Rybnik, Ruch Chorzów, Ruch Radzionków, Szczakowianka Jaworzno, Szombierki Bytom, Victoria Jaworzno with the exception of the Dąbrowa Basin clubs (which are nicknamed "gorole" - "non-Silesians" by Silesian fans).

The region of Silesia has always been hostile towards the capital city, Warsaw, a rivalry that is mirrored outside of sport as well. This is partly due to quasi-colonial exploitation of the region after 1945 by the central government (or at least perceived as such in the region), partly due to Warsaw strongly opposing any attempt for greater autonomy for Silesia, and the hostility of the mining communities (Upper Silesia being a predominantly mining region) towards the ruling capital. The two most successful clubs, Górnik Zabrze and Ruch Chorzów, frequently contested the championship title with Legia Warsaw and therefore, those matches are especially heated. Polonia Bytom, having spent many years in the top flight, has also developed an intense rivalry.

==== "The Great Triad" vs. "The Three Kings of Big Cities" ====
The Great Triad (Arka Gdynia, Cracovia & Lech Poznań) vs. The Three Kings of Big Cities (Lechia Gdańsk, Śląsk Wrocław & Wisła Kraków) - Fans of Arka, Cracovia and Lech share a friendship, known as "The Great Triad" (Wielka Triada). Fans of Lechia, Śląsk and Wisła also shared a friendship called Trzej Królowie Wielkich Miast and any match between the two groups was considered a big rivalry. Wisła then broke away from the alliance and joined Elana Toruń, Widzew Łódź and Ruch Chorzów fans, causing a massive rift in the Polish supporter world.

==== Other derbies between coalitions ====
Whilst most fans have their own alliances and friendships specific between their two clubs, there are instances of three or even four-way friendships. There are other long-term major coalitions in addition to the "Great Triad" and the "Three Kings of Big Cities". The most notable ones include:
- Legia Warsaw, Radomiak Radom, Zagłębie Sosnowiec and Olimpia Elbląg
- ŁKS Łódź, Zawisza Bydgoszcz and GKS Tychy
- Arka Gdynia, Zagłębie Lubin and Polonia Bytom
- Arka Gdynia, KSZO Ostrowiec Świętokrzyski and Lech Poznań
- Górnik Zabrze, ROW Rybnik, Concordia Knurów and Wisłoka Dębica
- Ruch Chorzów, Widzew Łódź, Elana Toruń and Wisła Kraków
- Motor Lublin, Górnik Łęczna, Chełmianka Chełm and Hetman Zamość. Although not in the "Eastern Horde" it is a popular football club from the east. Sometimes collectively called the "Eastern Horde" (Wschodnia Horda) or the Eastern coalition as the three clubs are one of the furthest towards the east of the country
- Zawisza Bydgoszcz, Górnik Wałbrzych and GKS Tychy
- Hetman Włoszczowa, Alit Ożarów and Orlicz Suchedniów
- Stal Mielec, Sandecja Nowy Sącz and Czarni Jasło
- GKS Tychy, Cracovia, Sandecja Nowy Sącz
- Stomil Olsztyn, Hutnik Kraków, Wisła Płock
These coalitions mean that although each club has its own rivalries and derbies, on the basis of "my friend's friend is my friend too" and "my friend's enemy is my enemy too", they add a lot of rivalries and derbies as very often, fans from all of the coalition clubs are present at a certain team's matches.

=== Most popular local derbies ===
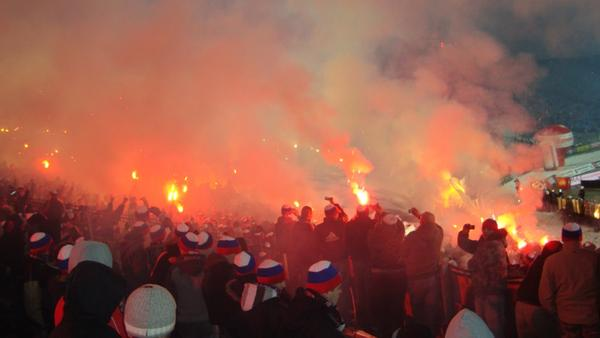
Górnik Zabrze fans during the Great Silesian Derby in 2009

- The Holy War (Kraków) (Święta Wojna) is a match between Wisła Kraków and Cracovia - multiple Polish champions, the two biggest clubs in Kraków and reportedly the oldest existing ones in Poland, both founded in 1906. The term "Holy War" was coined by the defender from KS Cracovia, Ludwik Gintel. The "Holy War" is one of the oldest (first friendly in 1908, first official game in 1913) and most played Polish derbies (over 100 official games). The rivalry is also considered the fiercest in Poland and one of the most intense in Central Europe. It is also the theme of a song devoted to their never-ending shenanigans, played by Andrusy.
- Great Silesian Derby (Wielkie Derby Śląska) is a derby between the two most successful Polish teams, 14-time national champions, both based in the Upper Silesian urban area: Górnik Zabrze and Ruch Chorzow. It is the most contested Polish derby (120+ official games).

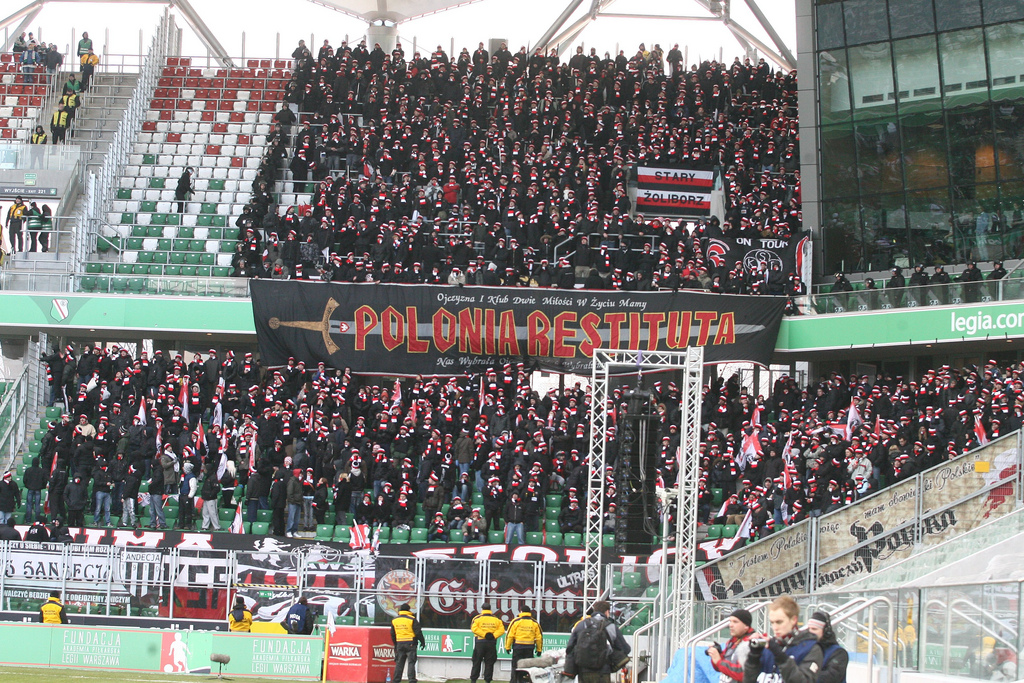
Polonia Warsaw fans during the Warsaw Derby in 2011

- Warsaw Derby between the most successful teams from Poland's capital: Legia Warsaw and Polonia Warsaw. It dates back to 1921 and both teams have won 29 times (as of November 2023).
- Łódź Derby between ŁKS Łódź and Widzew Łódź - one of the fiercest derbies, first played in 1926.
- Tricity Derby between Arka Gdynia and Lechia Gdańsk - the most successful clubs from Tricity. It is the biggest derby of northern Poland. In the past, matches between Lechia Gdańsk and Bałtyk Gdynia were also considered the Tricity Derby.
- Great Lwów Derby played between the oldest Polish clubs Pogoń Lwów and Czarni Lwów. It was one of the most contested and prestigious derbies of Poland prior to World War II. Also considered to be one of the oldest Polish derbies (first friendly in 1907, first official game in 1912).
- Rzeszów Derby between Resovia and Stal Rzeszów is one of the most contested Polish derbies (90+ official games). Even though it was never played in the highest division, it is considered a very intense rivalry.

=== Other derbies held in the top division ===
- Gdynia Derby between Arka Gdynia and Bałtyk Gdynia is the oldest Tricity rivalry dating back to 1931 (first friendly match).
- Bydgoszcz Derby between Polonia Bydgoszcz and Zawisza Bydgoszcz is a fierce rivalry between two Bydgoszcz teams, dating back to 1948 (first official match).
- Poznań Derby between Lech Poznań and Warta Poznań. Unusual in the fact that the cross-city rivalry does not provoke any tensions between the two groups of supporters due to historical differences in performance and the fact that many locals would watch both teams. Warta's golden years were the 1920s and the club won its last national championship in 1947, while Lech made its first Ekstraklasa appearance in 1948 and won its first ever championship in 1983.
- Lower Silesian Derby between Śląsk Wrocław and Zagłębie Lubin - the two largest teams in Lower Silesia, both Polish champions.

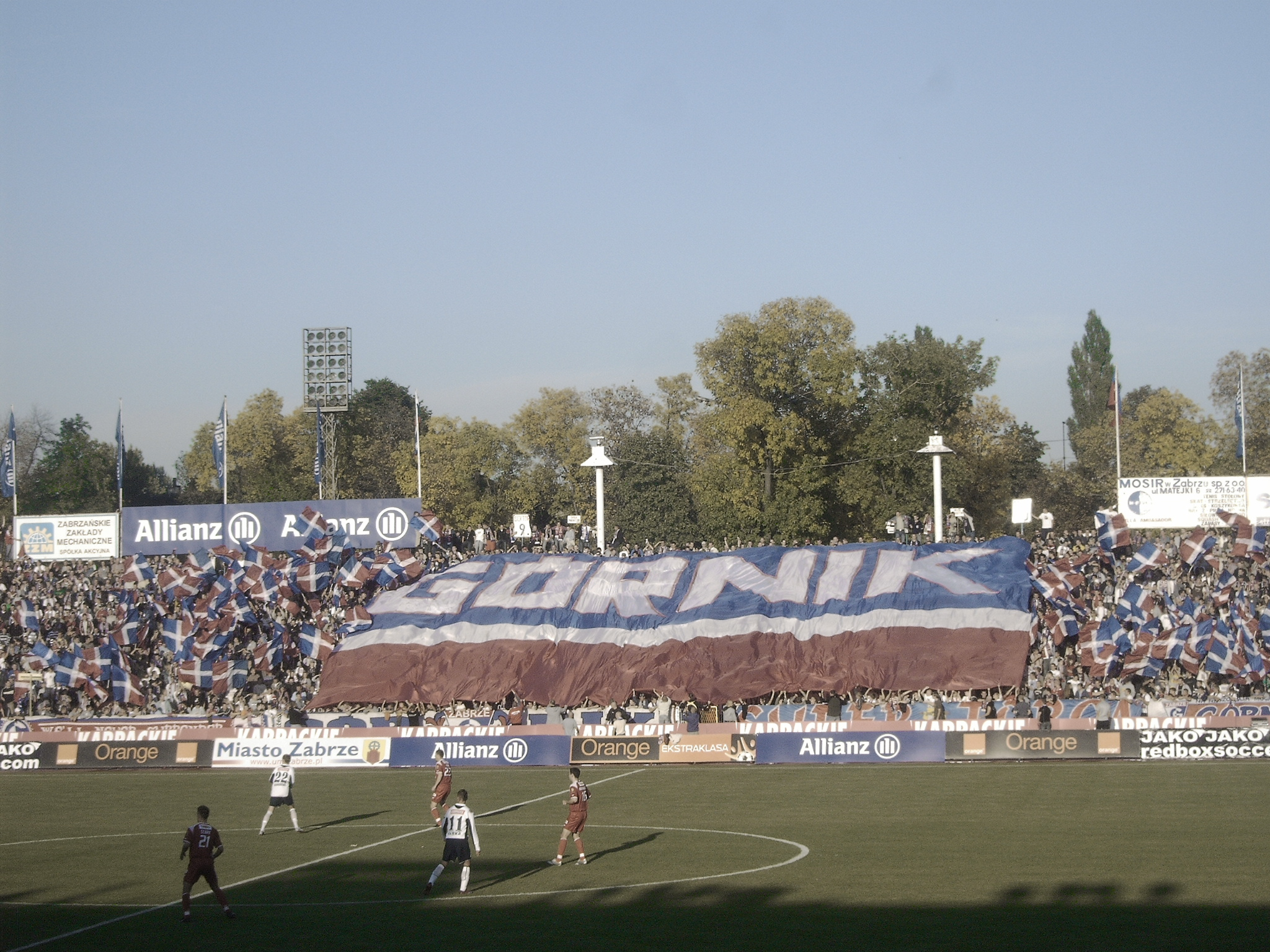
Górnik Zabrze fans during a match against Odra Wodzisław in 2007

- Upper Silesian derbies - Upper Silesia has a large number of professional teams and any match between the following teams can be considered to be an "Upper Silesian Derby": GKS Katowice, GKS Tychy, GKS Jastrzębie, Górnik Zabrze, Odra Wodzisław, Piast Gliwice, Polonia Bytom, ROW Rybnik, Ruch Chorzów, Ruch Radzionków, Szombierki Bytom. The most significant derbies include:
  - Bytom Derby between Polonia Bytom and Szombierki Bytom (and Ruch Radzionków in the past) - traditionally between Polonia and Szombierki, the two championship-winning Bytom teams, however Radzionków used to be a part of Bytom and part of Polonia's fanbase is located in Radzionków.
  - Chorzów Derby or Silesian Holy War between Ruch Chorzów and AKS Chorzów - a historic derby which used to be one of the fiercest rivalries in pre-war Poland
  - Old Silesian Derby between Polonia Bytom and Ruch Chorzów - both teams are amongst the oldest in Upper Silesia and they are also the two first Silesian teams to win the Polish championship (Ruch in 1933, Polonia in 1954). Bytom and Chorzów are neighboring cities in the central part of the Upper Silesian urban area. At 80+ official games, it is also the second most contested Silesian derby after the Great Silesian Derby.
  - The Silesian Classic (Śląski Klasyk) between Górnik Zabrze and GKS Katowice, with over 70 official matches played since the 1960s, is a popular rivalry since the 1980s, when both teams competed for the highest domestic trophies. It does not invoke the same levels of tension as the other Silesian derbies. Both teams share a very intense rivalry against Ruch Chorzów.
  - GKS Katowice vs. Ruch Chorzów - a very fierce rivalry between clubs based in the neighboring cities of Katowice and Chorzów.
  - Gliwice-Zabrze derby between Piast Gliwice and Górnik Zabrze - Gliwice and Zabrze are neighboring cities in the western part of the Upper Silesian urban area.
  - GieKSa Derby between GKS Katowice and GKS Tychy is a local derby between two sides who use the nickname GieKSa, which refers to the prefix "GKS" which stands for "Mining Sports Club" (Górniczy Klub Sportowy).
- Hanysy vs. Gorole (Silesian: Hanysy - "Silesians", Gorole - "non-Silesians") between any club with Silesian identity vs. any club from the Dąbrowa Basin which itself is part of the Upper Silesian urban area but is historically considered a part of Lesser Poland. Teams, who identify themselves as Silesians include GKS Katowice, GKS Tychy, GKS Jastrzębie, Górnik Zabrze, Odra Wodzisław, Piast Gliwice, Polonia Bytom, ROW Rybnik, Ruch Chorzów, Ruch Radzionków, and Szombierki Bytom while the Gorole clubs include Zagłębie Sosnowiec, Szczakowianka Jaworzno and Victoria Jaworzno. Clubs from southernmost parts of the Silesian Voivodeship, such as Góral Żywiec, and the two Bielsko-Biała clubs, Podbeskidzie and BKS Stal, are also not seen as Silesian by others in the region. Furthermore, BKS Stal and Zagłębie Sosnowiec have a mutual friendship with the deeply unpopular among Silesians Legia Warsaw, as well as each other.
- Minor Krakow Derbies - Hutnik Nowa Huta vs. Cracovia or Wisła Kraków vs. Garbarnia Kraków - apart from the "Holy War", matches between Hutnik and the other two sides are also considered Kraków derbies and are fierce rivalries. Due to Garbarnia's lack of sporting success and a small supporter presence, the derby is considered to be mostly of a historical nature.
- Szczecin Derby - a now historic derby between Pogoń Szczecin and Arkonia Szczecin, last played in 1981.
- Greater Poland Derby - a now historic derby between Lech Poznań and Dyskobolia Grodzisk Wielkopolski. Amica Wronki also used to contest this derby until the latter two clubs were disbanded.
- Copper Basin Derby - Miedź Legnica vs. Zagłębie Lubin

=== Other derbies by region ===
==== Northern Poland: Pomerania and Cuiavia ====
- Pomeranian Derby - Pogoń Szczecin vs. Lechia Gdańsk
- Cuiavian-Pomeranian Derby - Elana Toruń vs. Polonia Bydgoszcz or Zawisza Bydgoszcz - Bydgoszcz and Toruń share a rivalry which goes even beyond sporting competition
- Gdańsk Derby - Lechia Gdańsk vs. Gedania Gdańsk vs. Stoczniowiec Gdańsk
- Great Pomeranian Football Derby - Gwardia Koszalin vs. Gryf Słupsk vs. Kotwica Kołobrzeg
- Kaszubian Derby - Kaszubia Kościerzyna vs. Cartusia Kartuzy
- Koszalin Derby - Bałtyk Koszalin vs. Gwardia Koszalin
- Słupsk Voivodeship Derby - Gryf Słupsk vs. Pogoń Lębork
- Szczecinek Derby - Darzbór Szczecinek vs. Wielim Szczecinek
- Tczew Derby - Unia Tczew vs. Wisła Tczew
- Włocławek Derby - Kujawiak Włocławek vs. Włocłavia Włocławek

==== Central Poland: Greater Poland, Mazovia, Lubusz Voivodeship, Łódź Voivodeship ====
- The Great Derby of Greater Poland - KKS Kalisz vs. Górnik Konin or Ostrovia Ostrów Wielkopolski - fans from Kalisz do not consider themselves to belong to Greater Poland causing tension with nearby fans from Konin and Ostrów Wielkopolski.
- Greater Poland Derby between Dyskobolia Grodzisk Wielkopolski and Błękitni Wronki - before the reactivation of the football side by Amica, this derby used to be a high-profile game for the fans in Wronki. It later became a rivalry between Groclin and Amica Wronki. Both sides also used to play Lech Poznań to contest this derby when all three teams were playing in the Ekstraklasa.
- Szamotuły County Derby - Błękitni Wronki vs. Sparta Szamotuły - one of the oldest lower league derbies, as both teams are based in the Szamotuły County. Since 30 May 1976, when Sparta beat Błękitni 10-0 away from home, the teams have met only sporadically, with Amica Wronki replacing Błękitni between 1993 and 2007. Since Amica's disbandment and the re-founding of Błękitni, the rivalry has been renewed in the lower leagues
- Łodź Voivodeship Derby - GKS Bełchatów vs. RKS Radomsko - it can also refer to these two sides against any of the two Łódź teams, ŁKS or Widzew
- Minor Warsaw Derby - any match between Gwardia Warszawa, Hutnik Warszawa and RKS Ursus.
- Włochy Derby is a rivalry between two clubs based in the Włochy district of Warsaw - Okęcie Warszawa and Przyszłość Włochy
- Gorzów Wielkopolski Derby - Stilon Gorzów Wielkopolski vs. Warta Gorzów Wielkopolski
- Lubusz Voivodeship Derby - Stilon Gorzów Wielkopolski vs. Lechia Zielona Góra
- Lubusz Land Derby - Polonia Słubice vs. Celuloza Kostrzyn
- Eastern Łódź Voivodeship derby: Pelikan Łowicz vs. Unia Skierniewice

==== South-eastern Poland including Lesser Poland ====
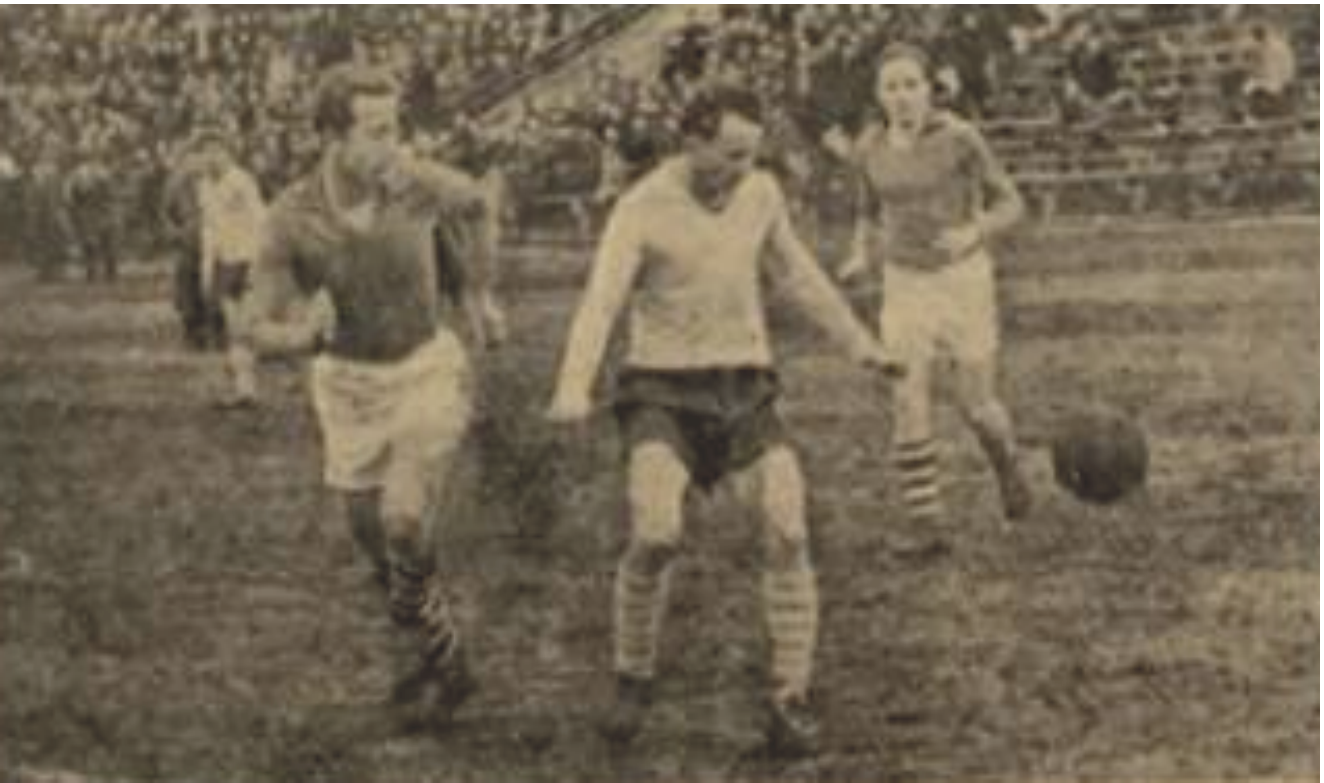
Lublin Derby in 1960

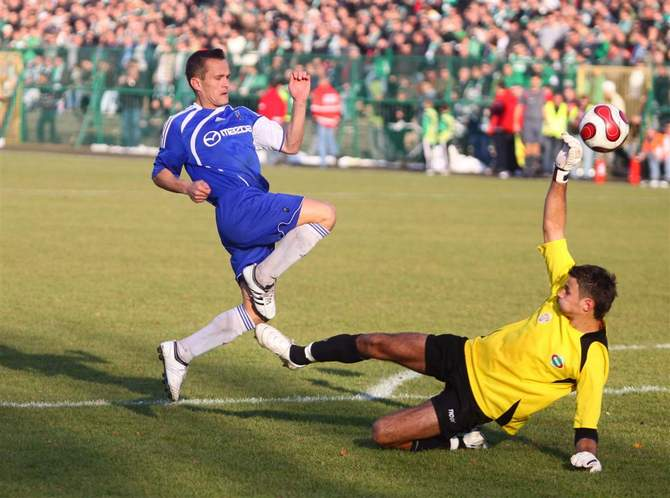
Radom Derby in 2010

- Częstochowa Derby - Raków Częstochowa vs. Skra Częstochowa
- Dębica Derby - Igloopol Dębica vs. Wisłoka Dębica
- Great Subcarpathian Derby - Siarka Tarnobrzeg vs. Stal Stalowa Wola
- Holy Cross Voivodeship Derby (Derby Świętokrzyskie) between Korona Kielce and KSZO Ostrowiec Świętokrzyski - two best teams in the Holy Cross Voivodeship
- Jaworzno Derby - Szczakowianka Jaworzno vs. Victoria Jaworzno - Szczakowianka are based in Szczakowa, Jaworzno, whereas Victoria are based in the Skałka district of Jaworzno.
- Czeladź Derby - CKS Czeladź vs. Górnik Piaski. Górnik Piaski is based in the southern part of the city, the Piaski district.
- Kielce Derby - a now historic derby between Korona Kielce and Błękitni Kielce
- Lublin Derby - Motor Lublin vs. KS Lublinianka
- Lublin Voivodeship Derby - Motor Lublin vs. Avia Świdnik
- Oświęcim Derby between Unia Oświęcim and Soła Oświęcim
- Przemyśl Derby - Czuwaj Przemyśl vs. Polonia Przemyśl
- Radom Derby between Broń Radom and Radomiak Radom
- Southern Subcarpathian Derby - Karpaty Krosno vs. Stal Sanok or Czarni 1910 Jasło - matches against Stal are alternatively called the Krosnian derby (after the old Krosno Voivodeship), sometimes erroneously called the Bieszczady Derby even though neither town lies in the mountains. The derby match against Czarni Jasło is alternatively called the Krosno-Jasło derby (Derby Jasła/Krosna)
- Steelworks derbies - Hutnik Kraków vs. KSZO Ostrowiec Świętokrzyski vs. Stal Stalowa Wola - called Hutnicze derby in Polish, between the three south-eastern teams associated with steelworks who frequently play each other.
- Tarnów Derby between Tarnovia Tarnów and Unia Tarnów
- Zamość Voivodeship derby - Hetman Zamość vs. Łada Biłgoraj

==== South-western Poland: Upper and Lower Silesia ====
- Wałbrzych Derby - Górnik Wałbrzych vs. Zagłębie Wałbrzych
- Wrocław Derby - Śląsk Wrocław vs. Ślęza Wrocław
- Bielsko-Biała Derby - BKS Bielsko-Biała vs. Podbeskidzie Bielsko-Biała
- Katowice Derby - GKS Katowice vs. Rozwój Katowice
- Opole-Wrocław derby - Odra Opole vs. Śląsk Wrocław
- Opole Voivodeship Derby - Odra Opole vs. MKS Kluczbork or Chemik Kędzierzyn-Koźle
- Northern Lower Silesian derby - Chrobry Głogów vs. Miedź Legnica or Zagłębie Lubin
- Ruda Śląska Derby - Urania Ruda Śląska vs. Grunwald Ruda Śląska vs. Slavia Ruda Śląska

==== North-eastern Poland ====
- Elbląg Derby - Olimpia Elbląg vs. Concordia Elbląg
- Olsztyn Derby - Stomil Olsztyn vs. Warmia Olsztyn
- Podlaskie Voivodeship Derby - Jagiellonia Białystok vs. ŁKS Łomża or vs. Warmia Grajewo
- Warmian Derby - Jeziorak Iława vs. OKS Stomil Olsztyn
- Masuria Derby - Mazur Ełk vs. Mazur Pisz

== Basketball ==
- Basketball Derby of Poland - Anwil Włocławek vs. Śląsk Wrocław
- Pomeranian Derby - AZS Koszalin vs. Czarni Słupsk
- Łódź Derby - ŁKS Łódź vs. Widzew Łódź
- Lower Silesian Derby - Śląsk Wrocław vs. Turów Zgorzelec
- Tricity Basketball Derby - Asseco Gdynia vs. Trefl Sopot
- Warsaw Derby - Polonia Warsaw vs. Legia Warsaw
- Wrocław Derby - Śląsk Wrocław vs. Gwardia Wrocław

== Handball ==
- Handball Derby of Poland - Iskra Kielce vs. Wisła Płock - two most successful teams in Poland.
- Lower Silesian derby: Śląsk Wrocław vs. Zagłębie Lubin
- Copper Basin derby: Miedź Legnica (pl) vs. Zagłębie Lubin
- Greater Poland derbies: Grunwald Poznań vs. Nielba Wągrowiec vs. Wolsztyniak Wolsztyn

== Ice hockey ==
- Katowice Derby - GKS Katowice vs. Naprzód Janów
- Silesian Hockey Derby - any match between GKS Tychy, GKS Katowice, GKS Jastzębie, Naprzód Janów, Polonia Bytom and Zagłębie Sosnowiec
- Lesser Poland Hockey Derby - any match between Podhale Nowy Targ, Cracovia, KTH Krynica and Unia Oświęcim
- Pomeranian Derby - TKH Toruń vs. Stoczniowiec Gdańsk
- Kuyavian-Pomeranian Derby - a now historic derby between TKH Toruń and Polonia Bydgoszcz

== Motorcycle speedway ==
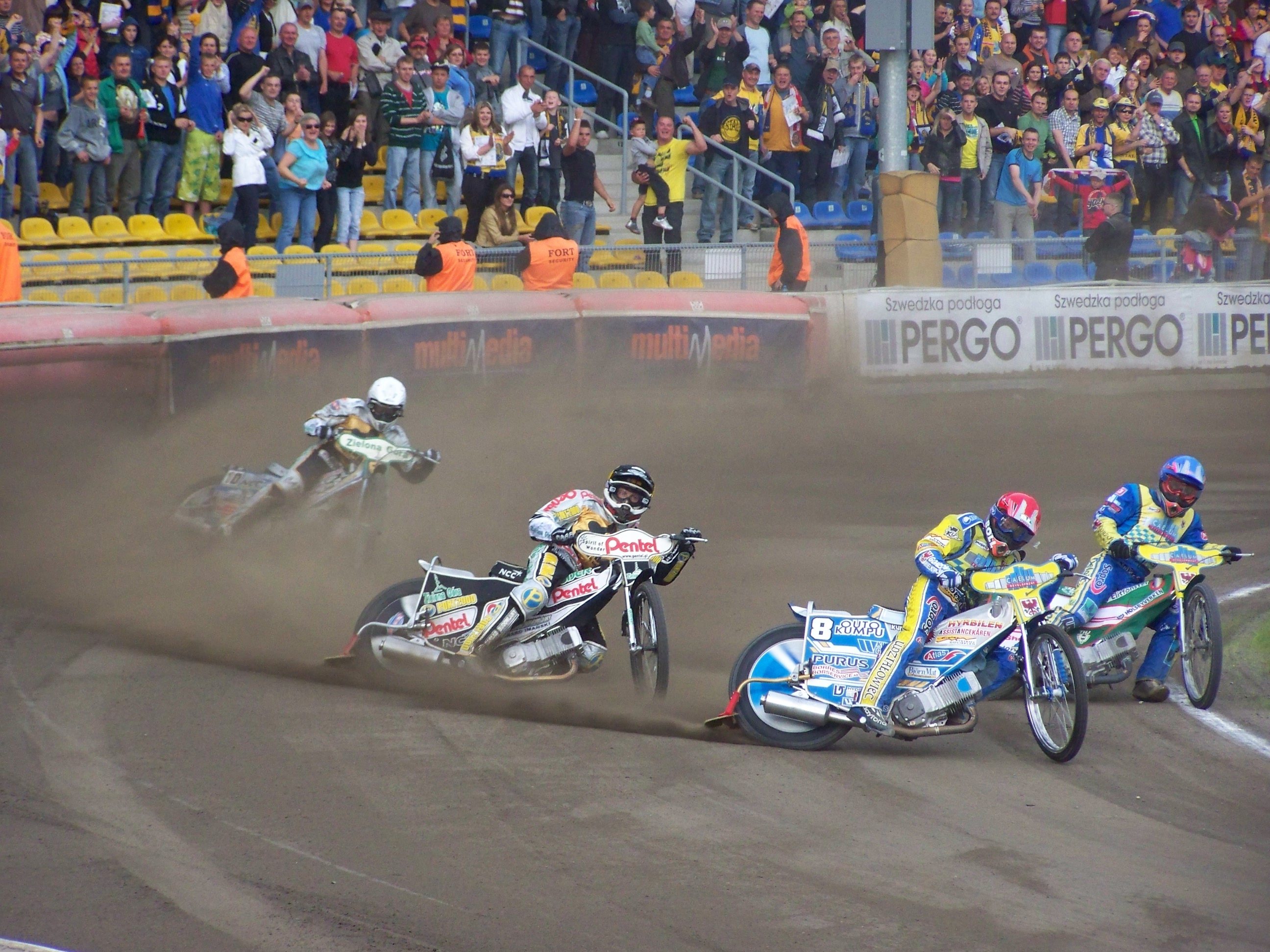
Derby of the Lubusz Land in 2009

- Pomeranian-Kuyavian Derby between (in Polish Derby Pomorza i Kujaw) between Polonia Bydgoszcz and KS Toruń - the most successful teams of northern Poland, multiple Polish champions
- The Derby of the Lubusz Voivodeship between Stal Gorzów and Falubaz Zielona Góra - Also known in English as the Lubusz Derby (Polish: Derby Lubuskie) is one of the most fiercely contested traditional Polish derbies.
- Southern Derby between Unia Tarnów and Stal Rzeszów
- Greater Poland Derby between Start Gniezno and Unia Leszno
- Pomeranian Speedway Derby between GKM Grudziądz and Wybrzeże Gdańsk
- Southern Greater Poland Speedway Derby: Ostrovia Ostrów Wlkp. vs. Unia Leszno

== Rugby union ==
- Tricity Rugby Derby - RC Arka Gdynia vs. RC Lechia Gdańsk
- Poznań Rugby Derby - Chaos Poznań vs. Posnania Poznań

== Volleyball ==
- The Holy War (Święta Wojna) - ZAKSA Kędzierzyn-Koźle vs. AZS Częstochowa
- Opole Voivodeship Derby - ZAKSA Kędzierzyn-Koźle vs. Stal Nysa
