= Grzegorz Kmiecik =

Polish footballer

Personal information
- Full name: Grzegorz Kmiecik
- Date of birth: 17 April 1984 (age 42)
- Place of birth: Kraków, Poland
- Height: 1.92 m (6 ft 4 in)
- Position: Striker

Team information
- Current team: Pogórze Gierałtowice
- Number: 31

Senior career*
Years	Team	Apps	(Gls)
2001–2008	Wisła Kraków II		
2004–2005	→ GKS Katowice (loan)	19	(5)
2005	→ GKS Bełchatów (loan)	9	(1)
2006	→ Polonia Warsaw (loan)	6	(1)
2006–2007	→ ŁKS Łódź (loan)	25	(4)
2007	→ Zagłębie Sosnowiec (loan)	10	(1)
2008	Wisła Kraków	1	(0)
2009	Stal Stalowa Wola	7	(1)
2009	SV Würmla	13	(5)
2010–	Sandecja Nowy Sącz	12	(2)
2010–2011	Tur Turek	16	(4)
2011–2012	Szczakowianka Jaworzno		
2012–2013	LKS Czaniec	12	(0)
2013	Janina Libiąż	27	(10)
2014	Limanovia Limanowa	12	(1)
2014	Poroniec Poronin	14	(3)
2014–2016	Górnik Libiąż		
2016	Sosnowianka Stanisław Dolny		
2017	Beskid Andrychów		
2017–2020	Babia Góra Sucha Beskidzka	69	(38)
2020–2021	Węgrzcanka Węgrzce Wielkie	18	(1)
2021–2022	Puls Broszkowice	17	(5)
2022	Zatorzanka Zator	12	(3)
2023–2024	Puls Broszkowice	15	(4)
2024–	Pogórze Gierałtowice	9	(6)

Managerial career
- 2014–2016: Górnik Libiąż (player-manager)
- 2017–2020: Babia Góra Sucha Beskidzka (player-manager)
- * Club domestic league appearances and goals as of 10:43, 23 June 2025 (UTC)

Grzegorz Kmiecik (born 17 April 1984) is a Polish footballer who plays as a striker for Klasa A club Pogórze Gierałtowice.

== Career ==
He made his debut in the Ekstraklasa on 31 July 2004 in the match GKS Katowice – Lech Poznań. In the 2007–08 season, he won the Polish Championship with Wisła Kraków. On 8 January 2009, Wisła terminated his contract by mutual agreement. In the spring half of the 2008–09 season, he played for Stal Stalowa Wola. In the autumn half of the 2009–10 season, he was a player for Austrian club SV Würmla. In the spring half of the 2009–2010 season, he played for Sandecja Nowy Sącz. At the start of the 2010–11 season, Kmiecik represented the II league club Tur Turek. In the spring, the forward moved to IV-league Szczakowianka Jaworzno, with whom he won promotion to the III league and, with 15 goals, became the top scorer of the Jaworzno team. Between 2012 and 2013, he played for III-league LKS Czaniec, and in 2013, he was a player for III-league Janina Libiąż. Since the 2017–2018 season, he has been the player-coach of MKS Babia Góra Sucha Beskidzka. In 2019, he led the club to promotion from the Wadowice A-class to the Oświęcim district league. In April 2020, he terminated his contract by mutual agreement.

== Personal life ==
Son of the Polish international and long-time Wisła Kraków player, Kazimierz Kmiecik.

== Honours ==
Wisła Kraków

- Ekstraklasa: 2007–08

Babia Góra Sucha Beskidzka

- Klasa A Wadowice: 2018–19

Pogórze Gierałtowice

- Klasa B Oświęcim: 2024–25
