= Damian Krajanowski =

Polish footballer

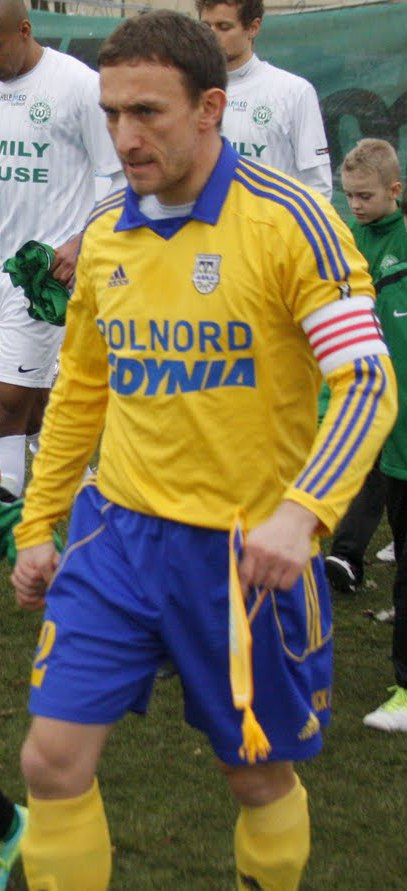

Personal information
- Full name: Damian Krajanowski
- Date of birth: 12 April 1983 (age 43)
- Place of birth: Ruda Śląska, Poland
- Height: 1.70 m (5 ft 7 in)
- Position: Defender

Team information
- Current team: Szczakowianka Jaworzno (manager)

Senior career*
Years	Team	Apps	(Gls)
- Stadion Śląski Chorzów
2002–2003	Ruch Chorzów	6	(0)
2003	Ruch Chorzów II		
2004–2006	Grunwald Ruda Śląska		
2006–2011	Flota Świnoujście	86	(10)
2011–2013	Arka Gdynia	58	(3)
2013–2014	GKS Tychy	16	(1)
2014–2017	Gwiazda Ruda Śląska (futsal)	25	(2)
2017	Pogoń Ruda Śląska		

Managerial career
- Pogoń Ruda Śląska
- 2020–2024: Orzeł Mokre
- 2024: Szczakowianka Jaworzno
- 2024: LZS Piotrówka
- 2024–: Szczakowianka Jaworzno
- * Club domestic league appearances and goals

Damian Krajanowski (born 12 April 1983) is a Polish football manager and former football and futsal player, currently in charge of Szczakowianka Jaworzno.

== Career ==
=== Club ===
In July 2011, he moved to Arka Gdynia on a two-year contract.

== Managerial statistics ==
As of match played 7 June 2025

Managerial record by team and tenure
Team	From	To	Record							
Team	From	To	G	W	D	L	GF	GA	GD	Win %
Szczakowianka Jaworzno	3 January 2024	24 February 2024	0	0	0	0	0	0	+0	—
LZS Piotrówka	22 March 2024	14 June 2024	13	6	1	6	28	25	+3	46.15
Szczakowianka Jaworzno	3 July 2024	Present	32	12	6	14	54	56	−2	37.50
Total			45	18	7	20	82	81	+1	40.00

== Honours ==
=== Player ===
Flota Świnoujście

- III liga, group II: 2007–08

=== Manager ===
Orzeł Mokre

- Klasa A Katowice: 2022–23
