= Ryszard Czerwiec =

Polish football player

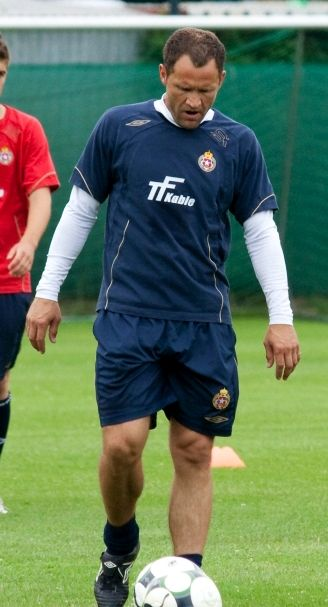

Personal information
- Date of birth: 28 February 1968 (age 58)
- Place of birth: Nowy Targ, Poland
- Height: 1.74 m (5 ft 8 1/2 in)
- Position: Midfielder

Team information
- Current team: Zgoda Byczyna
- Number: 14

Senior career*
Years	Team	Apps	(Gls)
1988–1989	Victoria Jaworzno		
1989–1992	Zagłębie Sosnowiec	88	(18)
1992–1996	Widzew Łódź	140	(34)
1996–1998	En Avant Guingamp	21	(0)
1998–2002	Wisła Kraków	114	(16)
2002–2004	Szczakowianka Jaworzno	54	(2)
2004–2005	GKS Katowice	16	(0)
2005–2006	Szczakowianka Jaworzno	28	(1)
2006–2007	Victoria Jaworzno		
2007	Strumyk Zarzecze		
2008	Bolesław Bukowno		
2008–2009	Skawinka Skawina		
2009–2010	Zgoda Byczyna		
2011–2013	Poroniec Poronin		
2014	Przemsza Okradzionów		
2014–2015	Zgoda Byczyna		
2016–2018	Orzeł Ryczów		
2018–2019	Zgoda Byczyna	20	(0)
2021–2022	Zgoda Byczyna	34	(0)
2023	SKS Łagisza	10	(0)
2023	Górnik Piaski	2	(0)
2024–	Zgoda Byczyna	9	(0)

International career
1991–2000	Poland	28	(0)
- * Club domestic league appearances and goals as of 29 October 2024

Ryszard Czerwiec (born 28 February 1968) is a Polish footballer who plays as a midfielder for Zgoda Byczyna. Czerwiec made 28 appearances for the Poland national team.

== Honours ==
Widzew Łódź

- Ekstraklasa: 1995–96
- Polish Super Cup: 1996

Wisła Kraków

- Ekstraklasa: 1998–99, 2000–01
- Polish Cup: 2001–02
- Polish League Cup: 2000–01

Poroniec Poronin

- IV liga Lesser Poland East: 2012–13

Orzec Ryczów

- Regional league Wadowice: 2016–17
- Polish Cup (Wadowice regionals): 2017–18
