= Jacek Ziarkowski =

Polish footballer (born 1976)

Personal information
- Full name: Jacek Tomasz Ziarkowski
- Date of birth: 4 September 1976 (age 50)
- Place of birth: Rejowiec Fabryczny, Poland
- Height: 1.86 m (6 ft 1 in)
- Position: Striker

Team information
- Current team: Granica Dorohusk (player-manager)
- Number: 19

Senior career*
Years	Team	Apps	(Gls)
- Sparta Rejowiec Fabryczny
–1996	Chełmianka Chełm		
1996–1999	Avia Świdnik		
1999–2002	Hetman Zamość		
2002–2003	Odra Wodzisław	30	(15)
2003–2004	Malatyaspor	1	(1)
2004	Odra Wodzisław	3	(0)
2005	Dyskobolia Grodzisk Wielkopolski	6	(1)
2005–2006	Odra Wodzisław	4	(1)
2006	Hetman Zamość		
2006	Górnik Zabrze	9	(0)
2006–2014	Sparta Rejowiec Fabryczny		
2014–2015	KS Lublin		
2022–2023	Tur Milejów	4	(4)
2023–2014	Sparta Rejowiec Fabryczny	9	(9)
2024–2025	Błękit Cyców	20	(20)
2025–	Granica Dorohusk	17	(36)

Managerial career
- 2010: Sparta Rejowiec Fabryczny (player-manager)
- 2014–2017: Avia Świdnik
- 2017–2019: Hetman Zamość
- 2020–2022: Kryształ Werbkowice
- 2025–: Granica Dorohusk (player-manager)
- * Club domestic league appearances and goals as of 21:42, 30 June 2026 (UTC)

Jacek Tomasz Ziarkowski (born 23 January 1975) is a Polish football manager and player who plays as a striker for Granica Dorohusk.

== Honours ==
=== Player ===
Tur Milejów

- Klasa A Lublin III: 2021–22

Individual

- II liga top scorer: 2001–02

=== Managerial ===
Hetman Zamość

- IV liga Lublin: 2018–19
- Polish Cup (Zamość regionals): 2018–19

Granica Dorohusk

- Klasa A Chełm: 2025–26
