= Stanko Svitlica =

Serbian footballer

Personal information
- Date of birth: 17 May 1976 (age 50)
- Place of birth: Kupres, SR Bosnia and Herzegovina, SFR Yugoslavia
- Height: 1.85 m (6 ft 1 in)
- Position: Forward

Youth career
- Bačka

Senior career*
Years	Team	Apps	(Gls)
1995–1996	Partizan	1	(0)
1996–1997	Čukarički	14	(4)
1997	Le Mans	8	(0)
1998	Proleter Zrenjanin	9	(1)
1998–1999	Spartak Subotica	16	(1)
1999–2000	Ethnikos Asteras	21	(1)
2000–2001	Čukarički	28	(13)
2001–2003	Legia Warsaw	60	(40)
2004	Hannover 96	3	(1)
2004–2006	LR Ahlen	38	(11)
2006	Wisła Kraków	2	(0)
2007	Čukarički	9	(0)
2009	Srem	15	(7)
2009	Banat Zrenjanin	12	(2)
2010	Srem	1	(0)
Total		237	(81)
- * Club domestic league appearances and goals

Stanko Svitlica (Serbian Cyrillic: Станко Свитлица; born 17 May 1976) is a Serbian retired footballer who played as a forward. He is best remembered for his time at Legia Warsaw, becoming the Polish Ekstraklasa top scorer in the 2002–03 season with 24 goals.

== Career ==
A journeyman, Svitlica played for several clubs in FR Yugoslavia, as well as France and Greece, before Dragan Okuka brought him to Legia Warsaw in the summer of 2001. He scored ten goals from 28 appearances in all competitions during his debut season in Poland, helping the club win the national championship that year. In the following season, Svitlica netted 29 goals in 38 games (24 in 29 in the league), becoming the first foreigner ever to win the Golden Boot in the Polish Ekstraklasa. He continued his goalscoring form in late 2003, securing him a transfer to Hannover 96 in the 2004 winter transfer window. Despite an impressive start (Svitlica scored against Bayern Munich beating Oliver Kahn on his debut after coming off the bench), his career in the Bundesliga never really took off and Hannover offloaded him after just half a year. He spent the following two seasons with LR Ahlen in the second tier of German football, before returning to Poland and joining Wisła Kraków. However, Svitlica struggled for fitness and after just two games left the club. He later returned to Serbia and his former club Čukarički, but failed to make an impact. In 2010, Svitlica retired from professional football.

== Honours ==
Partizan

- First League of FR Yugoslavia: 1995–96

Legia Warsaw

- Ekstraklasa: 2001–02
- Ekstraklasa Cup: 2002

Individual

- Ekstraklasa top scorer: 2002–03
