= Tomasz Kiełbowicz =

Polish footballer (born 1976)

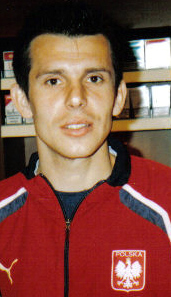

Personal information
- Full name: Tomasz Kiełbowicz
- Date of birth: 21 February 1976 (age 50)
- Place of birth: Hrubieszów, Poland
- Height: 1.76 m (5 ft 9 in)
- Positions: Left-back; left midfielder

Senior career*
Years	Team	Apps	(Gls)
1992–1993	Unia Hrubieszów		
1993–1996	Siarka Tarnobrzeg	101	(3)
1997–1999	Raków Częstochowa	72	(2)
1999	Widzew Łódź	15	(2)
2000	Polonia Warsaw	30	(7)
2001–2013	Legia Warsaw	237	(14)

International career
2000–2007	Poland	9	(0)
- * Club domestic league appearances and goals

Tomasz Kiełbowicz (Polish pronunciation: [ˈtɔmaʂ kʲɛwˈbɔvit͡ʂ]; born 21 February 1976) is a Polish former professional footballer who played as a left-back or left midfielder.

== Career ==
He joined Legia Warsaw from their local rivals Polonia Warsaw.

Kiełbowicz has made nine appearances for the Poland national football team.

== Honours ==
Polonia Warsaw

- Ekstraklasa: 1999–2000
- Polish League Cup: 1999–2000
- Polish Super Cup: 2000

Legia Warsaw

- Ekstraklasa: 2001–02, 2005–06
- Polish Cup: 2007–08, 2010–11, 2011–12
- Polish League Cup: 2001–02
- Polish Super Cup: 2008
