= Dickson Choto =

Zimbabwean footballer (born 1981)

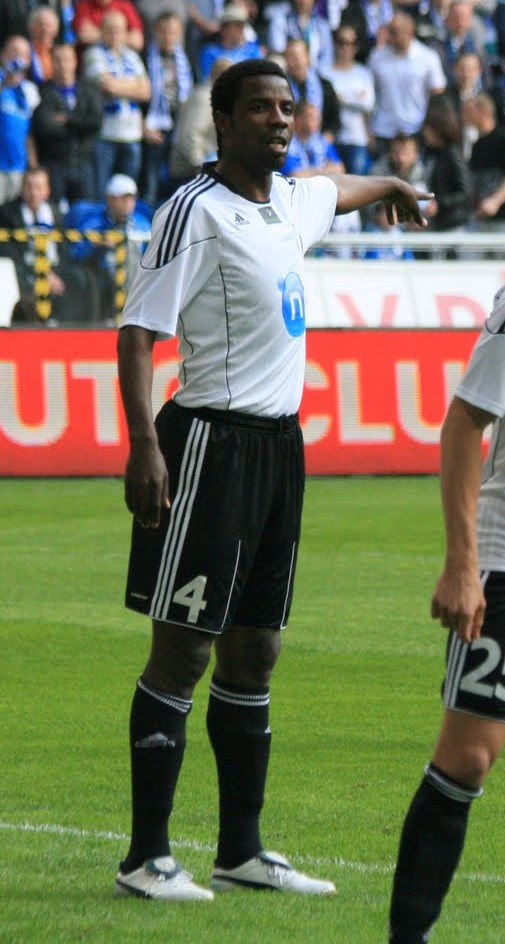
- Choto in 2011 with Legia Warsaw

Personal information
- Date of birth: 19 March 1981 (age 45)
- Place of birth: Wedza, Zimbabwe
- Height: 1.92 m (6 ft 4 in)
- Position: Centre-back

Senior career*
Years	Team	Apps	(Gls)
2000	Darryn Textiles Africa United		
2001–2002	Górnik Zabrze	12	(0)
2002–2003	Pogoń Szczecin	10	(0)
2003–2013	Legia Warsaw	145	(4)

International career
2000–2007	Zimbabwe	7	(0)
- * Club domestic league appearances and goals

Dickson Choto (born 19 March 1981) is a Zimbabwean former professional footballer who played as a centre-back.

== International career ==
Choto appeared for the Zimbabwe national team in the 2004 African Cup of Nations, and was not called up for 2006 African Cup of Nations.

== Honours ==
Legia Warsaw

- Ekstraklasa: 2005–06, 2012–13
- Polish Cup: 2007–08, 2010–11, 2011–12, 2012–13
- Polish Super Cup: 2008
