= Mirosław Waligóra =

Polish footballer

Personal information
- Full name: Mirosław Andrzej Waligóra
- Date of birth: 4 February 1970 (age 56)
- Place of birth: Kraków, Poland
- Height: 1.72 m (5 ft 7 1/2 in)
- Position: Striker

Senior career*
Years	Team	Apps	(Gls)
1982–1985	Wanda Kraków		
1990–1994	Hutnik Kraków	131	(61)
1994–2003	KFC Lommel	242	(61)
2003–2007	KVSK United	98	(50)
2007–2009	Verbroedering Geel-Meerhout		
2009–2013	KVK Beringen		

International career
	Poland Olympic	17	(2)
Medal record
Men's football
Representing Poland
Olympic Games
Silver medal – second place	1992 Barcelona	Team
- * Club domestic league appearances and goals

Mirosław Andrzej Waligóra (born 4 February 1970) is a Polish former professional footballer who played as a striker.

== Career ==
=== National team ===
He represented his native country at the 1992 Summer Olympics in Barcelona. There he won the silver medal with the national squad.

== Honours ==
Poland Olympic

- Olympic silver medal: 1992

Individual

- Ekstraklasa top scorer: 1991–92
