= Przemysław Szabat =

Polish footballer

Personal information
- Full name: Przemysław Szabat
- Date of birth: 19 December 1985 (age 40)
- Place of birth: Trzebinia, Poland
- Height: 1.82 m (5 ft 11 1/2 in)
- Position: Defender

Team information
- Current team: AP FFK Warsaw
- Number: 23

Senior career*
Years	Team	Apps	(Gls)
2003–2009	Wisła Kraków II		
2008	Wisła Kraków	1	(0)
2009–2012	Wisła Płock II		
2009	Wisła Płock	6	(1)
2009–2016	Świt Nowy Dwór Mazowiecki	103	(18)
2016–2020	Polonia Warsaw	76	(10)
2021–2022	Hutnik Warsaw	23	(5)
2022	Ząbkovia Ząbki	5	(0)
2023–	AP FFK Warsaw	47	(58)
- * Club domestic league appearances and goals as of 17:13, 24 June 2025 (UTC)

Przemysław Szabat (born 19 December 1985) is a Polish footballer who plays as defender for Klasa A club AP FFK Warsaw. He is a graduate of the Wisła Kraków's academy.

== Honours ==
Polonia Warsaw

- III liga Łódź-Masovia: 2015–16
