= Marcin Siedlarz =

Polish footballer

Personal information
- Full name: Marcin Siedlarz
- Date of birth: 15 February 1988 (age 38)
- Place of birth: Kraków, Poland
- Height: 1.78 m (5 ft 10 in)
- Position: Midfielder

Youth career
- Garbarnia Kraków

Senior career*
Years	Team	Apps	(Gls)
2004	Hutnik Kraków		
2005–2006	Górnik Zabrze	25	(1)
2006	Widzew Łódź	4	(0)
2006–2007	Siena	0	(0)
2008	Ruch Chorzów (ME)	13	(1)
2008–2010	Przebój Wolbrom	41	(2)
2009	→ GKS Katowice (loan)	3	(0)
2010–2013	Garbarnia Kraków	84	(19)
2013–2014	Flota Świnoujście	1	(0)
2014–2019	Garbarnia Kraków	118	(23)
- * Club domestic league appearances and goals

Marcin Siedlarz (born 15 February 1988) is a Polish former professional footballer who played as a midfielder.

== Honours ==
Widzew Łódź

- II liga: 2005–06

Garbarnia Kraków

- III liga Lesser Poland–Świętokrzyskie: 2010–11
- III liga, group IV: 2016–17
