= Mateusz Kowalski =

Polish footballer

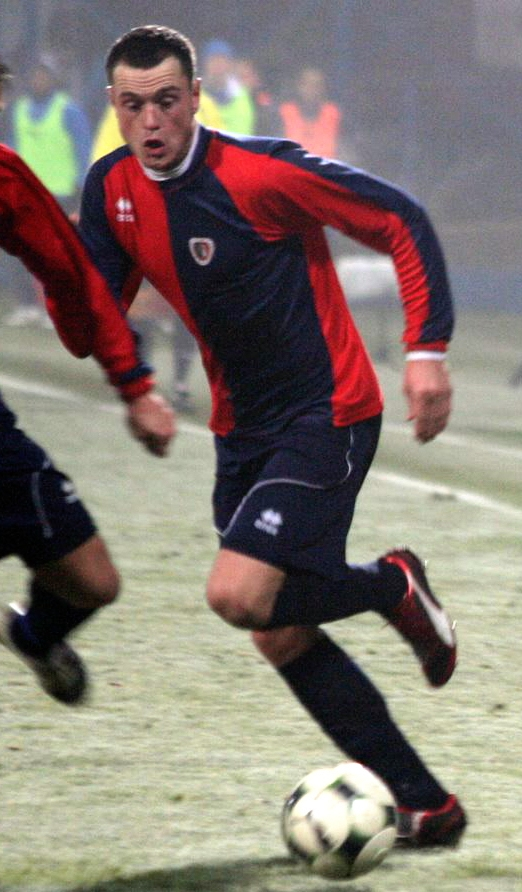

Personal information
- Full name: Mateusz Krzysztof Kowalski
- Date of birth: 30 September 1986 (age 40)
- Place of birth: Kraków, Poland
- Height: 1.86 m (6 ft 1 in)
- Position: Centre back

Youth career
- –2005: Wisła Kraków

Senior career*
| Years | Team | Apps | (Gls) |
| 2005–2007 | → Kolejarz Stróże (loan) | 43 | (3) |
| 2007–2008 | Wisła Kraków (ME) | 24 | (1) |
| 2008–2012 | Wisła Kraków | 5 | (0) |
| 2009–2010 | → Piast Gliwice (loan) | 27 | (1) |
| 2011–2012 | → Termalica Bruk-Bet (loan) | 16 | (1) |
| 2012–2013 | Sandecja Nowy Sącz | 12 | (0) |
| 2013–2015 | Garbarnia Kraków | 36 | (1) |
| 2015–2016 | FK Ørn Horten | 16 | (4) |
| 2016–2018 | Flint Fotball | 5 | (2) |

International career
| 2009–2010 | Poland U23 | 3 | (0) |
- * Club domestic league appearances and goals

Mateusz Krzysztof Kowalski (born 30 September 1986) is a Polish former professional footballer who played as a centre-back.

== Career ==
He is a trainee of Wisła Kraków and joined the first team in 2008. He made his Ekstraklasa debut in August 2008 against GKS Bełchatów, playing the full match. In February 2009 he was loaned out to Piast Gliwice, also in the Ekstraklasa.

== Career statistics ==
As of match played 29 May 2013

Appearances and goals by club, season and competition
| Club | Season | League | League | | National cup | | Europe | | Other | | Total | |
| Club | Season | League | Apps | Goals | Apps | Goals | Apps | Goals | Apps | Goals | Apps | Goals |
|---|---|---|---|---|---|---|---|---|---|---|---|---|
| Kolejarz Stróże (loan) | 2005–06 | III liga | 20 | 1 | 2 | 0 | — | | — | | 22 | 1 |
| Kolejarz Stróże (loan) | 2006–07 | III liga | 23 | 2 | 2 | 1 | — | | 2 | 0 | 27 | 3 |
| Kolejarz Stróże (loan) | Total | | 43 | 3 | 4 | 1 | — | | 2 | 0 | 49 | 4 |
| Wisła Kraków | 2007–08 | Ekstraklasa | 0 | 0 | 2 | 0 | — | | — | | 2 | 0 |
| Wisła Kraków | 2008–09 | Ekstraklasa | 1 | 0 | 4 | 0 | 0 | 0 | — | | 5 | 0 |
| Wisła Kraków | 2010–11 | Ekstraklasa | 4 | 0 | 1 | 0 | 4 (Note: Appearances in UEFA Europa League) | 0 | — | | 9 | 0 |
| Wisła Kraków | Total | | 5 | 0 | 7 | 0 | 4 | 0 | — | | 16 | 0 |
| Piast Gliwice (loan) | 2008–09 | Ekstraklasa | 10 | 0 | 2 | 0 | — | | — | | 12 | 0 |
| Piast Gliwice (loan) | 2009–10 | Ekstraklasa | 17 | 1 | 1 | 0 | — | | — | | 18 | 1 |
| Piast Gliwice (loan) | Total | | 27 | 1 | 3 | 0 | — | | — | | 30 | 1 |
| Termalica Bruk-Bet (loan) | 2011–12 | I liga | 16 | 1 | — | | — | | — | | 16 | 1 |
| Sandecja Nowy Sącz | 2012–13 | I liga | 12 | 0 | 1 | 0 | — | | — | | 13 | 0 |
| Career total | | | 103 | 5 | 15 | 1 | 4 | 0 | 2 | 0 | 124 | 5 |

== Honours ==
Wisła Kraków (ME)

- Młoda Ekstraklasa: 2007–08

Wisła Kraków

- Ekstraklasa: 2010–11
