= Górnik Libiąż =

Association football club in Libiąż

- Full name: Klub Sportowy Górnik Libiąż
- Founded: November 1945; 80 years ago
- Dissolved: September 2017; 8 years ago (senior team only)
- Ground: Municipal Stadium
- Capacity: 3,500
- Website: http://gorniklibiaz.futbolowo.pl
Home colours

Klub Sportowy Górnik Libiąż is a Polish professional football club based in Libiąż. The club currently doesn't field a senior team and focuses on youth development.

On 30 January 2014, the club returned to the historical name of KS Górnik Libiąż, which functioned from its foundation until 1996, when the name was changed to Janina Libiąż. The club's greatest success to date are appearances in the third division.

Górnik played its matches at Municipal Stadium in Libiąż.

== Rivals ==
Main rivals are neighbours Unia Oświęcim and Fablok Chrzanów.
