= Antoni Trzaskowski =

Polish footballer (1941–2025)

Personal information
- Date of birth: 6 April 1941
- Place of birth: Karczew, Poland
- Date of death: 26 March 2025 (aged 83)
- Height: 1.77 m (5 ft 10 in)
- Position: Defender

Youth career
- Mazur Karczew

Senior career*
Years	Team	Apps	(Gls)
1961–1962	Legia Warsaw II		
1963–1972	Legia Warsaw	218	(3)
1973–1975	Rochester Lancers		
- Polonia Greenpoint

International career
1971	Poland	1	(0)
- * Club domestic league appearances and goals

Antoni Trzaskowski (6 April 1941 – 26 March 2025) was a Polish footballer who played as a defender.

Trzaskowski played for Polish club Legia Warsaw, as well as American clubs Rochester Lancers and Polonia Greenpoint. He earned one cap for the Poland national team in 1971.

Trzaskowski died on 26 March 2025, at the age of 83.

== Honours ==
Legia Warsaw

- Ekstraklasa: 1968–69, 1969–70
- Polish Cup: 1963–64, 1965–66
