= Szczakowianka Jaworzno =

- Full name: Jaworznickie Stowarzyszenie Piłkarskie Szczakowianka Jaworzno
- Nickname(s): Szczaksa; Drwale (The Lumberjacks)
- Founded: 9 July 1923; 102 years ago
- Ground: Stadion Miejski
- Capacity: 7,000
- Chairman: Andrzej Sojka
- Manager: Damian Krajanowski
- League: V liga Silesia I
- 2024–25: V liga Silesia I, 9th of 16
- Website: szczakowianka.pl
Home colours

Garbarnia Szczakowianka Jaworzno is a Polish football club based in Szczakowa, Jaworzno. The club is currently playing in the V liga Silesia I.

== History ==
The club was founded on 9 July 1923 as fusion of three local clubs: Kartagina, Rewia' and Sparta, under the name KS Szczakowianka. With the exception of the years 1948–1951, and brief few-day spell in 2007 (where it was met with widespread fan protests) the club has kept its Szczakowianka name throughout its existence, despite numerous minor name changes. They have spent the majority of their history in the 4th tier of Polish football, until the year 2000 they slowly started to make their way up the league pyramid.

In the 2001–02 season, they gained promotion to the second division after a double play-off match against RKS Radomsko. However, the game was shrouded in controversy, with Branko Rašić becoming the centre of attention with Radomsko claiming he was ineligible to play, as he was on loan from Victoria Jaworzno before the transfer window at the time. The case took several years to resolve, with numerous court proceedings, Polish FA involvement and even appeals to UEFA, Polish Olympic Committee, and debates in the Polish parliament. The case had widespread consequences, with many officials punished and removed from office as a result, and changes in law to prevent similar incidents in the future.

In the 2002–03 season, they played in the Ekstraklasa and were relegated after one year in the top-flight. Whilst it looked like they were about to win promotion immediately, they were convicted of match-fixing, along with several other clubs in widespread enquiry that shook Polish football.

After the two scandals, the club was heavily hit by sanctions with lack of confidence from supporters and sponsors alike in the management which led to the club being bankrupt by 2007. The team carried on relying on its reserve team in the fourth division, whilst the first team was dissolved and the disgraced management made redundant.

=== Match-fixing scandal ===
After a play-off scandal where Szczakowianka were convicted of match-fixing in the 2003–04 season, Szczakowianka played in second league starting with a ten-point deduction at the start of the season: Several matches were annulled as result.

Autumn 2003 round:

- Szczakowianka Jaworzno – Cracovia Kraków 2–1 (1–0)
- Szczakowianka Jaworzno – Arka Gdynia 4–0 (2–0)
- Szczakowianka Jaworzno – Błękitni Stargard 2–0 (1–0)
- Szczakowianka Jaworzno – Ruch Chorzów 1–0 (0–0)
- Szczakowianka Jaworzno – ŁKS Łódź 2–1 (2–1)
- Szczakowianka Jaworzno – Polar Wrocław 1–1 (0–1)
- Szczakowianka Jaworzno – Podbeskidzie Bielsko-Biała 5–2 (3–0)
- Piast Gliwice – Szczakowianka Jaworzno 1–2 (0–1)
- Jagiellonia Białystok – Szczakowianka Jaworzno 0–2 (0–1)
- RKS Radomsko – Szczakowianka Jaworzno 2–1 (0–0)
- KS Stasiak Opoczno – Szczakowianka Jaworzno 1–3 (1–2)
- Zagłębie Lubin – Szczakowianka Jaworzno 0–0 (0–0)
- Tłoki Gorzyce – Szczakowianka Jaworzno 3–2 (0–1)
- Aluminium Konin – Szczakowianka Jaworzno 1–3 (0–2)
- GKS Bełchatów – Szczakowianka Jaworzno 1–2 (1–1)
- KSZO Ostrowiec Świętokrzyski – Szczakowianka Jaworzno 1–1 (1–1)
- Szczakowianka Jaworzno – MKS Pogoń Szczecin 0–0 (0–0)

Spring 2004 round:

- Szczakowianka Jaworzno – Jagiellonia Białystok 4–0 (2–0)
- Szczakowianka Jaworzno – Tłoki Gorzyce 4–2 (1–0)
- Szczakowianka Jaworzno – Zagłębie Lubin 4–1 (1–1)
- Szczakowianka Jaworzno – GKS Bełchatów 1–2 (0–0)
- Szczakowianka Jaworzno – Piast Gliwice 1–1 (1–1)
- Szczakowianka Jaworzno – RKS Radomsko 2–0 (1–0)
- Polar Wrocław – Szczakowianka Jaworzno 0–2 (0–1)
- MKS Pogoń Szczecin – Szczakowianka Jaworzno 3–2 (2–0)
- Arka Gdynia – Szczakowianka Jaworzno 0–1 (0–0)
- Cracovia Kraków – Szczakowianka Jaworzno 8–1 (5–0)
- Podbeskidzie Bielsko-Biała – Szczakowianka Jaworzno 2–0 (2–0)
- ŁKS Łódź – Szczakowianka Jaworzno 0–1 (0–0)
- Ruch Chorzów – Szczakowianka Jaworzno 1–1 (0–1)
- Szczakowianka Jaworzno – KS Stasiak Opoczno 1–0 (1–0)
- Szczakowianka Jaworzno – Aluminium Konin 1–0 (0–0)

== Current squad ==
Note: Flags indicate national team as defined under FIFA eligibility rules; some limited exceptions apply. Players may hold more than one non-FIFA nationality.

No.	Pos.	Nation	Player
1	GK	(Poland) POL	Krystian Nawrocki
2	DF	(Poland) POL	Mateusz Radosz
4	DF	(Poland) POL	Kamil Byrski
5	DF	(Poland) POL	Grzegorz Bizoń
6	MF	(Poland) POL	Madrin Piegzik
7	MF	(Poland) POL	Sebastian Dylowicz
8	MF	(Poland) POL	Michał Biskup
9	MF	(Poland) POL	Adrian Wojtaszak
10	MF	(Poland) POL	Damian Mrożek
13	FW	(Poland) POL	Daniel Niedzielski
14	FW	(Poland) POL	Marcin Smarzyński
15	DF	(Poland) POL	Wojciech Jamróz

No.	Pos.	Nation	Player
16	FW	(Poland) POL	Sebastian Chojnowski
18	MF	(Poland) POL	Grzegorz Kantek
19	MF	(Poland) POL	Piotr Sierczyński
20	FW	(Poland) POL	Kamil Głośny
21	FW	(Poland) POL	Dariusz Kurowski
22	DF	(Poland) POL	Filip Koralik
23	GK	(Poland) POL	Witold Wojtków
25	FW	(Poland) POL	Paweł Wasilewski
77	GK	(Poland) POL	Sławomir Jeziorek
—	MF	(Poland) POL	Paweł Cygnar
—	MF	(Poland) POL	Paweł Sermak
—	MF	(Poland) POL	Grzegorz Kmiecik

== Famous players ==
Players who have played in the top division

- Ryszard Czerwiec
- Maciej Iwański
- Akanni-Sunday Wasiu
- Andrzej Bledzewski

== Fans ==
Due to the number of large teams in close proximity, the club has a small but fanatical support. They used have a strong friendship with fans of Szombierki Bytom. The major rivals are cross-town neighbours Victoria Jaworzno, with whom they contest the Jaworzno derby. They also have rivalry with nearby Ruch Radzionków fans.

== See also ==
- Football in Poland
- List of football teams
- Champions' Cup/League
- UEFA Cup
