= Victoria Jaworzno =

Polish football club

- Full name: Górniczy Klub Sportowy; Victoria Jaworzno
- Nickname: Vica
- Founded: 1918; 108 years ago 2014; 12 years ago (refounded)
- Ground: Victoria Municipal Stadium
- Chairman: Nikodem Ryś
- Manager: Robert Moskal
- League: IV liga Lesser Poland
- 2025–26: V liga Lesser Poland West, 1st of 16 (promoted)
- Website: victoria1918.jaworzno.pl
Home colours	Away colours

GKS Victoria Jaworzno is a Polish football and boxing club based in Jaworzno, Poland. It is the oldest Polish miner's football club.

== History and etymology ==
The club's origins date back to 1914, however it was an unofficial gathering more so than a functioning sports club. After Poland re-gained independence in 1918, among the people returning from the front-lines of World War I was a man named Emil Dawidowicz. Emil with the help of his two friends, Rudolf Hot, a plumber from Moravian Ostrava, and Rudolf Gloser, a baker from Bielsko founded TSV Jaworzno (Towarzystwo Sportowe Victoria Jaworzno). They chose the name Victoria after the then popular Czech klub Viktoria Žižkov. 1918 is the club's official founding date as that is when the club charter, rules and regulations were established.

In 1974, the club changed its name to GKS Jaworzno, in reference to its mining community (GKS stands for Górniczy Klub Sportowy, which means "Mining Sport Club") after a merger with Górnik Jaworzno and Azotania Jaworzno. The merger was a flop, and in 1981 the historical name "Victoria" was re-incorporated once again.

The club has spent the majority of its history between the third and fifth tiers of Polish football.

In 2011, the club ceased to exist, due to ongoing financial troubles. The club's ground was demolished and listed for redevelopment.

In June 2014, the club was re-founded by the Victoria 1919 Jaworzno association and fielded a senior football team in the lowest division for the 2014–15 season. The new Victoria has no legal ties to the previous association and was re-activated due to a handful of loyal supporters. On 23 August 2014, the club played its first league match since its rebirth away against Lew Olszyny.

== Fans ==
The fan movement started in 1982–83. The fans were unique in the fact that as well as following the football team, they also attended the team's boxing matches. In the 80s and 90s, the fan group Desperados strongly identified with the skinhead movement and extreme right-wing ideology.

The club's biggest rival are fellow locals Szczakowianka Jaworzno. They have good relations with fans of Fablok Chrzanów since 1995 and handball fans of MTS Chrzanów.

The fans remained loyal to the colours despite the club's disappearance, and there were frequent talks of re-establishment of the club. Those talks proved worthwhile as the fans played a crucial role in the club's rebirth, and the fans made up a majority of the squad for the inaugural 2014–15 season.
