= 2017–18 in Polish football =

Football in Poland
- Season: 2017–18

2016–17 in Polish football
- Ekstraklasa champions
- Legia Warsaw
- Polish Cup winner
- Legia Warsaw
- Polish Super Cup winner
- Arka Gdynia
- Teams in Europe
- Legia Warsaw; Jagiellonia Białystok; Lech Poznań; Arka Gdynia
- Poland national team
- 2018 FIFA World Cup qualification
- 2018 FIFA World Cup

The 2017–18 season was the 93rd season of competitive football in Poland.

== League competitions ==
=== Ekstraklasa ===
==== Regular season ====
Pos	Team	Pld	W	D	L	GF	GA	GD	Pts	Qualification
1	Lech Poznań	30	15	10	5	49	23	+26	55	Qualification for the Championship round
2	Jagiellonia Białystok	30	16	6	8	45	36	+9	54 (Note: Head-to-head record: Jagiellonia 1–0 Legia, Legia 0–2 Jagiellonia.)	Qualification for the Championship round
3	Legia Warsaw	30	17	3	10	43	31	+12	54	Qualification for the Championship round
4	Wisła Płock	30	15	4	11	42	35	+7	49	Qualification for the Championship round
5	Górnik Zabrze (Note: Górnik Zabrze were punished after the 26th round with a deduction of three points because of stadium destruction by the fans.The appeal against the penalty has been accepted on 22 March 2018.)	30	12	11	7	56	46	+10	47	Qualification for the Championship round
6	Korona Kielce	30	11	12	7	44	37	+7	45	Qualification for the Championship round
7	Wisła Kraków	30	12	8	10	41	36	+5	44	Qualification for the Championship round
8	Zagłębie Lubin	30	10	13	7	39	33	+6	43	Qualification for the Championship round
9	Arka Gdynia	30	10	10	10	38	32	+6	40	Qualification for the Relegation round
10	Cracovia	30	10	9	11	40	40	0	39	Qualification for the Relegation round
11	Śląsk Wrocław	30	7	10	13	35	48	−13	31 (Note: Head-to-head record: Śląsk 3–0 Pogoń, Pogoń 3–2 Śląsk.)	Qualification for the Relegation round
12	Pogoń Szczecin	30	8	7	15	34	48	−14	31	Qualification for the Relegation round
13	Piast Gliwice	30	6	12	12	28	38	−10	30 (Note: Head-to-head record: Piast 1–2 Lechia, Lechia 0–2 Piast.)	Qualification for the Relegation round
14	Lechia Gdańsk (Note: Lechia Gdańsk were punished with a deduction of one point for failing with licensing requirements.)	30	7	10	13	39	51	−12	30	Qualification for the Relegation round
15	Bruk-Bet Termalica Nieciecza	30	7	8	15	32	52	−20	29	Qualification for the Relegation round
16	Sandecja Nowy Sącz	30	4	13	13	27	46	−19	25	Qualification for the Relegation round

Source: Ekstraklasa, 90minut
Rules for classification: 1) Points; 2) Head-to-head points; 3) Head-to-head goal difference; 4) Head-to-head goals scored; 5) Head-to-head away goals scored (only if two teams); 6) Goal difference; 7) Goals scored; 8) Fairplay ranking; 9) Draw. (Note: Head-to-head record is used only after all the matches between the teams in question have been played.)

==== Championship round ====
Pos	Team	Pld	W	D	L	GF	GA	GD	Pts	Qualification
1	Legia Warsaw (C)	37	22	4	11	55	35	+20	70	Qualification for the Champions League first qualifying round
2	Jagiellonia Białystok	37	20	7	10	55	41	+14	67	Qualification for the Europa League second qualifying round
3	Lech Poznań	37	16	12	9	53	34	+19	60	Qualification for the Europa League first qualifying round
4	Górnik Zabrze	37	16	12	9	68	54	+14	60	Qualification for the Europa League first qualifying round
5	Wisła Płock	37	17	6	14	53	45	+8	57	
6	Wisła Kraków	37	15	10	12	51	42	+9	55	
7	Zagłębie Lubin	37	13	13	11	45	42	+3	52	
8	Korona Kielce	37	12	13	12	49	54	−5	49	

Source: Ekstraklasa, 90minut
Rules for classification: 1) Points; 2) Points in regular season; 3) Head-to-head points in regular season; 4) Head-to-head goal difference in regular season; 5) Head-to-head goals scored in regular season; 5) Head-to-head away goals scored in regular season (if only two teams); 7) Goal difference; 8) Goals scored; 9) Fairplay ranking; 10) Play-off (only if needed to decide champion, teams for relegation or teams for UEFA competitions).
(C) Champions

==== Relegation round ====
Pos	Team	Pld	W	D	L	GF	GA	GD	Pts	Qualification
9	Cracovia	37	13	11	13	51	52	−1	50	
10	Śląsk Wrocław	37	13	11	13	50	54	−4	50	
11	Pogoń Szczecin	37	12	9	16	46	54	−8	45	
12	Arka Gdynia	37	11	10	16	46	48	−2	43	
13	Lechia Gdańsk	37	9	13	15	46	58	−12	39	
14	Piast Gliwice	37	8	13	16	40	48	−8	37	
15	Bruk-Bet Termalica Nieciecza (R)	37	9	9	19	39	66	−27	36	Relegation to I liga
16	Sandecja Nowy Sącz (R)	37	6	15	16	34	54	−20	33	Relegation to I liga

Source: Ekstraklasa, 90minut
Rules for classification: 1) Points; 2) Points in regular season; 3) Head-to-head points in regular season; 4) Head-to-head goal difference in regular season; 5) Head-to-head goals scored in regular season; 5) Head-to-head away goals scored in regular season (if only two teams); 7) Goal difference; 8) Goals scored; 9) Fairplay ranking; 10) Play-off (only if needed to decide champion, teams for relegation or teams for UEFA competitions).
(R) Relegated

=== I liga ===
==== Regular season ====
Pos	Team	Pld	W	D	L	GF	GA	GD	Pts	Promotion or Relegation
1	Miedź Legnica (C, P)	34	17	12	5	53	27	+26	63	Promotion to Ekstraklasa
2	Zagłębie Sosnowiec (P)	34	17	7	10	46	32	+14	58	Promotion to Ekstraklasa
3	Chojniczanka Chojnice	34	16	8	10	48	33	+15	56	
4	GKS Tychy	34	16	7	11	41	40	+1	55	
5	GKS Katowice	34	16	6	12	44	34	+10	54	
6	Wigry Suwałki	34	15	7	12	40	37	+3	52	
7	Raków Częstochowa	34	14	9	11	50	40	+10	51 (Note: Head-to-head record: Raków 1–2 Stal, Stal 2–3 Raków.)	
8	Stal Mielec	34	14	9	11	51	46	+5	51	
9	Podbeskidzie Bielsko-Biała	34	11	13	10	37	37	0	46 (Note: Head-to-head record: Chrobry 1–1 Podbeskidzie, Podbeskidzie 1–0 Chrobry.)	
10	Chrobry Głogów	34	12	10	12	46	47	−1	46	
11	Odra Opole	34	12	9	13	37	43	−6	45	
12	Puszcza Niepołomice	34	11	11	12	38	38	0	44	
13	Bytovia Bytów	34	10	10	14	36	45	−9	40	
14	Stomil Olsztyn (Note: Stomil was punished with a deduction of one point for infringement of the licensing regulations.)	34	12	4	18	39	50	−11	39	
15	Pogoń Siedlce (R)	34	9	11	14	42	50	−8	38	Qualification to play-off
16	Górnik Łęczna (R)	34	8	11	15	29	42	−13	35	Relegation to II liga
17	Olimpia Grudziądz (R)	34	7	10	17	24	37	−13	31	Relegation to II liga
18	Ruch Chorzów (Note: Ruch Chorzów was punished with a deduction of six points for infringement of the licensing regulations (five points before start of the league and six points during the season. The second punishment was reduced to one point).) (R)	34	9	6	19	35	58	−23	27	Relegation to II liga

Source: 1 liga, 90minut
Rules for classification: 1. points won; 2. points in head-to-head matches; 3. goal difference in hth matches; 4. goals scored in hth matches; 5. away goals in hth matches (only if two teams are tied); 6. total goal difference; 7. total goals scored; 8. fairplay ranking.
(C) Champions; (P) Promoted; (R) Relegated

== Polish Cup ==
2 May 2018 Polish Cup Final	Arka Gdynia	1–2	Legia Warsaw	PGE Narodowy, Warsaw
16:00 CEST	Sołdecki 90+9'	PZPN; 90minut	Niezgoda 12'; Cafú 29'	Attendance: 47,037; Referee: Piotr Lasyk (Bytom)

== Polish Super Cup ==
7 July 2017 2017 Polish Super Cup	Legia Warsaw	1–1 (3–4 p)	Arka Gdynia	Polish Army Stadium, Warsaw
20:30 CEST	Moulin 27'	Report	Pazdan 20' (o.g.)	Attendance: 26,756; Referee: Szymon Marciniak (Płock)
	Penalties
	Szwoch (penalty scored); Moulin (penalty missed); Guilherme (penalty scored); Dąbrowski (penalty scored); Kopczyński (penalty missed)		(penalty scored) Warcholak; (penalty scored) Sołdecki; (penalty scored) Zbozień; (penalty scored) Jurado

== Polish clubs in Europe ==
=== Legia Warsaw ===
2017–18 UEFA Champions League

==== Qualifying phase ====
12 July 2017 2nd QR	IFK Mariehamn (Finland)	0–3	(Poland) Legia Warsaw	Wiklöf Holding Arena, Mariehamn
20:00 CEST (UTC+2)	Dafaa (yellow card) 56' (yellow-red card) 61'; Sid (yellow card) 88'	Report	Guilherme 8' (pen.); Nagy 40'; Hämäläinen 44'; Dąbrowski (yellow card) 55'	Attendance: 1,637; Referee: Andrew Dallas (Scotland)

19 July 2017 2nd QR	Legia Warsaw (Poland)	6–0 (9–0 agg.)	(Finland) IFK Mariehamn	Polish Army Stadium, Warsaw
20:45 CEST (UTC+2)	Guilherme 6'; Kojola 37' (o.g.); Kucharczyk 40', 54' (pen.); Szymański 80'; Michalak 81'	Report		Attendance: 15,829; Referee: Tiago Martins (Portugal)

26 July 2017 3rd QR	Astana (Kazakhstan)	3–1	(Poland) Legia Warsaw	Astana Arena, Astana
16:00 CEST (UTC+2)	Muzhikov (yellow card) 32'; Kabananga 36', (yellow card) 84'; Mayewski 45'; Logvinenko (yellow card) 83'; Twumasi 90+4'; Aničić (yellow card) 90+6'	Report	Sadiku 79'	Attendance: 21,000; Referee: Tamás Bognár (Hungary)

2 August 2017 3rd QR	Legia Warsaw (Poland)	1–0 (2–3 agg.)	(Kazakhstan) Astana	Polish Army Stadium, Warsaw
20:45 CEST (UTC+2)	Jędrzejczyk (yellow card) 60'; Czerwiński 76'; Nagy (yellow card) 81'	Report	Mayewski (yellow card) 16'; Aničić (yellow card) 60'; Twumasi (yellow card) 74'	Attendance: 24,937; Referee: Jakob Kehlet (Denmark)

2017–18 UEFA Europa League

==== Qualifying phase ====
17 August 2017 4th QR	Legia Warsaw (Poland)	1–1	(Moldova) Sheriff Tiraspol	Polish Army Stadium, Warsaw
20:45 CEST (UTC+2)	Pazdan (yellow card) 28'; Hloušek (yellow card) 59'; Hämäläinen 76'	Report	Brezovec (yellow card) 50'; Cristiano (yellow card) 71'; Bayala 87'	Attendance: 17,733; Referee: Aleksandar Stavrev (Macedonia)

24 August 2017 4th QR	Sheriff Tiraspol (Moldova)	0–0 (1–1 agg.)	(Poland) Legia Warsaw	Sheriff Stadium, Tiraspol
19:00 CEST (UTC+2)	Balima (yellow card) 80'; Cristiano (yellow card) 85'; Jairo (yellow card) 88'	Report	Nagy (yellow card) 27'; Pazdan (yellow card) 38' (yellow-red card) 38'; Dąbrowski (yellow card) 68'; Kucharczyk (yellow card) 78'	Attendance: 7,500; Referee: Ivan Bebek (Croatia)

=== Jagiellonia Białystok ===
2017–18 UEFA Europa League

==== Qualifying phase ====
29 June 2017 1st QR	Dinamo Batumi (Georgia (country))	0–1	(Poland) Jagiellonia Białystok	Ramaz Shengelia Stadium, Kutaisi
18:00 CEST (UTC+2)	Grigalashvili (yellow card) 22'; Tevdoradze (yellow card) 42'; Tvildiani (yellow card) 90+1'	Report	Sheridan (penalty missed) 16', 49', (yellow card) 87'; Góralski (yellow card) 30'; Romanchuk (yellow card) 68'; Sekulski (yellow card) 90+3'	Attendance: 4,000; Referee: Erik Lambrechts (Belgium)

6 July 2017 1st QR	Jagiellonia Białystok (Poland)	4–0 (5–0 agg.)	(Georgia (country)) Dinamo Batumi	Stadion Miejski, Białystok
20:30 CEST (UTC+2)	Tomelin 58'; Černych 81'; Runje 88'; Sekulski 90+3'	Report	Tvildiani (yellow card) 43'; Mgeladze (yellow card) 56'; Tarkhnishvili (yellow card) 63' (yellow-red card) 75'	Attendance: 13,538; Referee: Yuriy Mozharovsky (Ukraine)

13 July 2017 2nd QR	Gabala (Azerbaijan)	1–1	(Poland) Jagiellonia Białystok	Bakcell Arena, Baku
19:00 CEST (UTC+2)	Halliday (yellow card) 17'; Mammadov (yellow card) 27'; Joseph-Monrose 47'; Huseynov (yellow card) 56'; Stanković (yellow card) 88'	Report	Romanchuk 15'; Góralski (yellow card) 18'; Burliga (yellow card) 44'	Attendance: 6,500; Referee: Marco Fritz (Germany)

20 July 2017 2nd QR	Jagiellonia Białystok (Poland)	0–2 (1–3 agg.)	(Azerbaijan) Gabala	Stadion Miejski, Białystok
20:30 CEST (UTC+2)	Guilherme (yellow card) 22'	Report	Gurbanov 18'; Huseynov (yellow card) 83'; Ozobić 89'; Ramaldanov (yellow card) 90'	Attendance: 13,326; Referee: Sebastian Colţescu (Romania)

=== Lech Poznań ===
2017–18 UEFA Europa League

==== Qualifying phase ====
29 June 2017 1st QR	Lech Poznań (Poland)	4–0	(North Macedonia) FK Pelister	INEA Stadion, Poznań
20:45 CEST (UTC+2)	N. Nielsen 28' (pen.); Šitum 30', 57'; Majewski 38'	Report		Attendance: 18,215; Referee: Luís Godinho (Portugal)

6 July 2017 1st QR	FK Pelister (North Macedonia)	0–3 (0–7 agg.)	(Poland) Lech Poznań	Stadion Mladost, Strumica
17:00 CEST (UTC+2)	Markoski (yellow card) 16'	Report	Burić (yellow card) 12'; Trałka 39'; Jevtić 66'; Jóźwiak 77'	Attendance: 750; Referee: François Letexier (France)

13 July 2017 2nd QR	Haugesund (Norway)	3–2	(Poland) Lech Poznań	Haugesund Stadion, Haugesund
19:00 CEST (UTC+2)	Abdi 24'; Kiss (yellow card) 45'; Hajradinović (yellow card) 31', (goal) 71'; Ibrahim 73'; Stølås (yellow card) 78'	Report	Gumny (yellow card) 27'; Majewski (yellow card) 68', (goal) 75'; Tetteh (yellow card) 84'; Jevtić 90+3' (pen.)	Attendance: 4,011; Referee: Alain Bieri (Switzerland)

20 July 2017 2nd QR	Lech Poznań (Poland)	2–0 (4–3 agg.)	(Norway) Haugesund	INEA Stadion, Poznań
20:00 CEST (UTC+2)	Jevtić 32'; N. Nielsen (yellow card) 85', (goal) 90+3'; Šitum (yellow card) 87'	Report	Abdi (yellow card) 40' (yellow-red card) 76'; Andreassen (yellow card) 77'; Leite (yellow card) 90+5'	Attendance: 21,968; Referee: Alexander Harkam (Austria)

27 July 2017 3rd QR	Utrecht (Netherlands)	0–0	(Poland) Lech Poznań	Stadion Galgenwaard, Utrecht
19:00 CEST (UTC+2)	Janssen (yellow card) 33'; Labyad (yellow card) 74'; Emanuelson (yellow card) 83'	Report	Kostevych (yellow card) 8'; Trałka (yellow card) 58'	Attendance: 13,817; Referee: Aleksandar Stavrev (Macedonia)

3 August 2017 3rd QR	Lech Poznań (Poland)	2–2 (2–2 agg.)	(Netherlands) Utrecht	INEA Stadion, Poznań
20:15 CEST (UTC+2)	Gytkjær 26', 90+4'; Vujadinović (yellow card) 57'; Šitum (yellow card) 61'; N. Nielsen (yellow card) 90+5'	Report	Kerk 1'; Janssen (yellow card) 16'; van der Maarel (yellow card) 42'; Leeuwin (yellow card) 48' (yellow-red card) 70'; Dessers 89'; Ayoub (yellow card) 90+5'	Attendance: 33,446; Referee: Mads-Kristoffer Kristoffersen (Denmark)

=== Arka Gdynia ===
2017–18 UEFA Europa League

==== Qualifying phase ====
27 July 2017 3rd QR	Arka Gdynia (Poland)	3–2	(Denmark) Midtjylland	Stadion GOSiR, Gdynia
20:00 CEST (UTC+2)	Marcus da Silva 31', 39' (pen.); Piesio (yellow card) 52'; Siemaszko 90+2'	Report	Hassan 33'; Dal Hende 36'	Attendance: 14,037; Referee: Enea Jorgji (Albania)

3 August 2017 3rd QR	Midtjylland (Denmark)	2–1 (4–4 agg.)	(Poland) Arka Gdynia	MCH Arena, Herning
20:30 CEST (UTC+2)	Hassan (yellow card) 57'; Socha 77' (o.g.); Sørloth 90+3'	Report	Socha (yellow card) 5'; Marcus da Silva (yellow card) 42'; Sobieraj (yellow card) 45+3'; Sołdecki 59'; Siemaszko (yellow card) 79'	Attendance: 8,138; Referee: Eitan Shmuelevitz (Israel)

== National teams ==
=== Poland national team ===
==== 2018 FIFA World Cup qualification ====
Pos	Team	Pld	W	D	L	GF	GA	GD	Pts	Qualification
1	Poland	10	8	1	1	28	14	+14	25	Qualification to 2018 FIFA World Cup
2	Denmark	10	6	2	2	20	8	+12	20	Advance to second round
3	Montenegro	10	5	1	4	20	12	+8	16	
4	Romania	10	3	4	3	12	10	+2	13	
5	Armenia	10	2	1	7	10	26	−16	7	
6	Kazakhstan	10	0	3	7	6	26	−20	3	

Source: FIFA
Rules for classification: Qualification tiebreakers

1 September 2017 2018 FIFA World Cup qualification	Denmark	4–0	Poland	Parken Stadium, Copenhagen
20:45 CEST (UTC+2)	Delaney 15'; Cornelius 42'; Jørgensen 59'; Eriksen 80'	Report (FIFA); Report (UEFA)	Mączyński (yellow card) 77'	Attendance: 34,505; Referee: Milorad Mažić (Serbia)

4 September 2017 2018 FIFA World Cup qualification	Poland	3–0	Kazakhstan	Stadion Narodowy, Warsaw
20:45 CEST (UTC+2)	Milik 11'; Glik 74'; Lewandowski 86' (pen.)	Report (FIFA); Report (UEFA)	Dmitrenko (yellow card) 24'; Suyumbayev (yellow card) 52'; Logvinenko (yellow card) 62'; Kuat (yellow card) 64'	Attendance: 56,963; Referee: Andris Treimanis (Latvia)

5 October 2017 2018 FIFA World Cup qualification	Armenia	1–6	Poland	Vazgen Sargsyan Republican Stadium, Yerevan
18:00 CEST (UTC+2)	Hambardzumyan 39'; Manoyan (yellow card) 84'	Report (FIFA); Report (UEFA)	Grosicki 2'; Lewandowski 18', 25', 64'; Błaszczykowski 58'; Wolski 89'	Attendance: 5,478; Referee: Matej Jug (Slovenia)

8 October 2017 2018 FIFA World Cup qualification	Poland	4–2	Montenegro	Stadion Narodowy, Warsaw
18:00 CEST (UTC+2)	Mączyński 6'; Grosicki 16'; Lewandowski 86'; Stojković 89' (o.g.)	Report (FIFA); Report (UEFA)	Vukčević (yellow card) 27', (goal) 83'; Bećiraj (yellow card) 38'; Ivanić (yellow card) 53'; Mugoša 78'	Attendance: 57,538; Referee: Daniele Orsato (Italy)

==== 2018 FIFA World Cup ====
===== Group stage =====
Pos	Team	Pld	W	D	L	GF	GA	GD	Pts	Qualification
1	Colombia	3	2	0	1	5	2	+3	6	Advance to knockout stage
2	Japan	3	1	1	1	4	4	0	4 (Note: Fair play points: Japan −4, Senegal −6.)	Advance to knockout stage
3	Senegal	3	1	1	1	4	4	0	4	
4	Poland	3	1	0	2	2	5	−3	3	

Source: FIFA
Rules for classification: Group stage tiebreakers
Notes:

19 June 2018 2018 FIFA World Cup	Poland	1–2	Senegal	Moscow, Russia
18:00 (UTC+3)	Krychowiak 86'	Report	Cionek 37' (o.g.); Niang 60'	Stadium: Spartak Stadium; Attendance: 44,190; Referee: Nawaf Shukralla (Bahrain)

24 June 2018 2018 FIFA World Cup	Poland	0–3	Colombia	Kazan, Russia
21:00 (UTC+3)		Report	Mina 40'; Falcao 70'; Cuadrado 75'	Stadium: Kazan Arena; Referee: César Arturo Ramos (Mexico)

28 June 2018 2018 FIFA World Cup	Japan	0–1	Poland	Volgograd, Russia
17:00 (UTC+3)		Report	Bednarek 59'	Stadium: Volgograd Arena; Attendance: 42,189; Referee: Janny Sikazwe (Zambia)

==== Friendlies ====
10 November 2017 Friendly	Poland	0–0	Uruguay	Warsaw, Poland
20:45 CET (UTC+1)		Report		Stadium: Stadion Narodowy; Attendance: 56,147; Referee: István Vad (Hungary)

13 November 2017 Friendly	Poland	0–1	Mexico	Gdańsk, Poland
20:45 CET (UTC+1)		Report	Jiménez 13'	Stadium: Stadion Energa Gdańsk; Attendance: 32,736; Referee: Oliver Drachta (Austria)

23 March 2018 Friendly	Poland	0–1	Nigeria	Wrocław, Poland
20:45 (UTC+1)		Report	Moses 61' (pen.)	Stadium: Stadion Miejski; Attendance: 41,208; Referee: Michael Oliver (England)

27 March 2018 Friendly	Poland	3–2	South Korea	Chorzów, Poland
20:45 (UTC+2)	Lewandowski 32'; Grosicki 45'; Zieliński 90+2'	Report	Lee Chang-min 85'; Hwang Hee-chan 87'	Stadium: Stadion Śląski; Attendance: 53,129; Referee: Tore Hansen (Norway)

8 June 2018 Friendly	Poland	2–2	Chile	Poznań, Poland
20:45 (UTC+2)	Lewandowski 30'; Zieliński 34'	Report	Valdés 38'; Albornoz 56'	Stadium: INEA Stadion; Referee: Paolo Mazzoleni (Italy)

12 June 2018 Friendly	Poland	4–0	Lithuania	Warsaw, Poland
18:00 (UTC+2)	Lewandowski 19', 32'; Kownacki 71'; Błaszczykowski 82' (pen.)	Report		Stadium: Stadion Narodowy; Attendance: 53,803; Referee: Kevin Blom (Netherlands)
