= 2017–18 Legia Warsaw season =

Legia Warsaw
2017–18 season
- Chairman: Dariusz Mioduski
- Manager: Jacek Magiera (until 13 September 2017); Romeo Jozak (13 September 2017-14 April 2018); Dean Klafurić (from 14 April 2018)
- Stadium: Polish Army Stadium
- Ekstraklasa: 1st
- Polish Cup: Winners
- UEFA Champions League: Third qualifying round
- UEFA Europa League: Play-off round
- Top goalscorer: League: Jarosław Niezgoda (13); All: Jarosław Niezgoda (15)
- Highest home attendance: 26,756 (vs Arka Gdynia, 7 July 2017)
- Lowest home attendance: 7,240 (vs Bytovia Bytów, 28 November 2017)
- Average home league attendance: 17,334
Home colours	Away colours	Third colours

The 2017–18 Legia Warsaw season is the club's 101st season of existence, and their 81st in the top flight of Polish football. Legia entered the 2017–18 season as the defending Ekstraklasa champions.

== Players ==
=== Current squad ===
As of 11 March 2018

Note: Flags indicate national team as defined under FIFA eligibility rules; some limited exceptions apply. Players may hold more than one non-FIFA nationality.

No.	Pos.	Nation	Player
1	GK	POL	Arkadiusz Malarz
2	DF	POL	Michał Pazdan (3rd captain)
3	MF	POL	Tomasz Jodłowiec
4	DF	BRA	Maurício (on loan from Lazio)
6	MF	LUX	Chris Philipps
7	MF	CRO	Domagoj Antolić
8	MF	ITA	Cristian Pasquato
9	FW	CRO	Eduardo
11	FW	POL	Jarosław Niezgoda
12	GK	LAT	Vjačeslavs Kudrjavcevs
14	DF	CZE	Adam Hloušek
15	MF	POL	Michał Kopczyński (vice-captain)
17	MF	POL	Mikołaj Kwietniewski
18	MF	POL	Michał Kucharczyk

No.	Pos.	Nation	Player
20	MF	MNE	Marko Vešović
22	MF	FIN	Kasper Hämäläinen
25	DF	POL	Łukasz Turzyniecki
26	MF	POR	Cafú (on loan from FC Metz)
28	DF	POL	Łukasz Broź
31	MF	POL	Krzysztof Mączyński
32	MF	SRB	Miroslav Radović (captain)
33	GK	POL	Radosław Cierzniak
34	DF	ESP	Iñaki Astiz
40	MF	USA	Brian Iloski
44	DF	FRA	William Rémy
53	MF	POL	Sebastian Szymański
55	DF	POL	Artur Jędrzejczyk

=== Transfers ===
==== In ====
No.	Pos	Player	From	Type	Window	Fee	Date	Source
7	MF	(Croatia) Domagoj Antolić	Dinamo Zagreb	Transfer	Winter	Undisclosed	4 January 2018	
9	FW	(Croatia) Eduardo	Free agent	Transfer	Winter	Free	4 January 2018	
20	MF	(Montenegro) Marko Vešović	HNK Rijeka	Transfer	Winter	Undisclosed	5 January 2018	
44	DF	(France) William Rémy	Montpellier	Transfer	Winter	Undisclosed	8 January 2018	
17	MF	(Poland) Mikołaj Kwietniewski	Fulham	Transfer	Winter	Undisclosed	25 January 2018	
6	MF	(Luxembourg) Chris Philipps	FC Metz	Transfer	Winter	Undisclosed	2 February 2018	
40	GK	(Latvia) Vjačeslavs Kudrjavcevs	Free agent	Transfer	Winter	Free	12 February 2018	
12	MF	(United States) Brian Iloski	UCLA Bruins	Transfer	Winter	Free	16 February 2018	
26	MF	(Portugal) Cafú	FC Metz	Loan	Winter		27 February 2018	

==== Out ====
No.	Pos	Player	To	Type	Window	Fee	Date	Source
25	DF	(Poland) Jakub Rzeźniczak	Qarabağ FK	Transfer	Summer		4 July 2017	
42	DF	(Poland) Bartłomiej Urbański	Willem II Tilburg	Transfer	Summer		6 July 2017	
52	DF	(Poland) Mateusz Wieteska	Górnik Zabrze	Transfer	Summer		7 July 2017	
8	MF	(Belgium) Vadis Odjidja-Ofoe	Olympiacos F.C.	Transfer	Summer	€3,000,000	9 July 2017	
99	FW	(Albania) Armando Sadiku	Levante UD	Transfer	Winter	€1,000,000	31 January 2018	
75	MF	(France) Thibault Moulin	PAOK	Transfer	Winter	€1,500,000	31 January 2018	
27	FW	(Nigeria) Daniel Chima Chukwu	Molde FK	Transfer	Winter		14 February 2018	

== Competitions ==
=== Friendlies ===
24 June 2017 Friendly	Legia Warsaw	3–0	Wisła Płock	Warka, Poland
17:00 CEST (UTC+2)	Guilherme 52' (pen.); Chima 56'; Michalak 79'	Report	Sielewski (yellow card) 24'

30 June 2017 Friendly	Radomiak Radom	0–2	Legia Warsaw	Radom, Poland
14:00 CEST (UTC+2)		Report

2 September 2017 Friendly	Mazur Karczew	1–6	Legia Warsaw	Karczew, Poland
14:00 CEST (UTC+2)		Report

13 January 2018 Florida Cup	Legia Warsaw	2–3	Barcelona S.C.	Lauderhill, Florida
15:00 CEST (UTC+2)	Niezgoda 7'; Remy 90'		Caicedo 18'; Nahuelpán 21'; Esterilla 27'	Stadium: Central Broward Regional Park, Lauderhill; Attendance: 2,048; Referee: Andres Pfefferkorn

20 January 2018 Florida Cup	Legia Warsaw	0–2	Atlético Nacional	St. Petersburg, Florida
18:00 CEST (UTC+2)			Ramírez 36'; Ramírez 42'	Stadium: Al Lang Stadium, St. Petersburg, Florida; Attendance: 3,500; Referee: Guido Gonzalez Jr.

27 January 2018 Friendly	Legia Warsaw	2–0	Silkeborg IF	Benidorm, Spain
CEST (UTC+2)	Sadiku 31'; Niezgoda 70'; Dąbrowski (yellow card) 50'; Szymański (yellow card) 79'	Report

1 February 2018 Friendly	Legia Warsaw	1–5	FC Viktoria Plzeň	Benidorm, Spain
16:00 CEST (UTC+2)	Hämäläinen 62'	Report	Kopic 16'; Krmenčík 17', 33'; Chorý 65'; Bakoš 86'

2 February 2018 Friendly	Legia Warsaw	1–1	Shanghai Shenxin F.C.	Benidorm, Spain
15:30 CEST (UTC+2)	Iloski 23'	Report	Yifeng 15'

=== Polish Super Cup ===
7 July 2017	Legia Warsaw	1–1 (3–4 p)	Arka Gdynia	Polish Army Stadium, Warsaw
20:30 CEST	Moulin 27'	Report	Pazdan 20' (o.g.)	Attendance: 26,756; Referee: Szymon Marciniak (Płock)
	Penalties
	Szwoch (penalty scored); Moulin (penalty missed); Guilherme (penalty scored); Dąbrowski (penalty scored); Kopczyński (penalty missed)		(penalty scored) Warcholak; (penalty scored) Sołdecki; (penalty scored) Zbozień; (penalty scored) Jurado

=== Polish Cup ===
8 August 2017 Round of 32	Wisła Puławy	1–4	Legia Warsaw	Stadion MOSiR, Puławy
18:00 CEST (UTC+02:00)	Hirsz 90'	Report	Mączyński 9'; Sedlewski 11' (o.g.); Nagy 64'; Sadiku 90'	Attendance: 3,930; Referee: Bartosz Frankowski (Toruń)

21 September 2017 Round of 16	Ruch Zdzieszowice	0–4	Legia Warsaw	Stadion Miejski, Opole
15:30 CEST (UTC+02:00)		Report	Broź 18' (pen.); Sadiku 64'; Szymański 75'; Dąbrowski 82'	Attendance: 3,500; Referee: Kornel Paszkiewicz (Wrocław)

25 October 2017 Quarterfinals	Bytovia Bytów	1–3	Legia Warsaw	Stadion MOSiR, Bytów
20:30 CEST (UTC+02:00)	Szewczyk 45'	Report	Sadiku 2', 87'; Pasquato 29'	Attendance: 2,000; Referee: Jarosław Przybył (Kluczbork)

28 November 2017 Quarterfinals	Legia Warsaw	4–2	Bytovia Bytów	Polish Army Stadium, Warsaw
20:45 CET (UTC+01:00)	Pereira 47', 62'; Szymański 49', 71'	Report	Surdykowski 26'; Kamiński 90'	Attendance: 7,240; Referee: Sebastian Jarzębak (Bytom)

Legia Warsaw won 7–3 on aggregate.

28 March 2018 Semifinals	Górnik Zabrze	1–1	Legia Warsaw	Ernest Pohl Stadium, Zabrze
18:00 CEST (UTC+02:00)	Kurzawa 75'	Report	Vešović 61'	Attendance: 22,708; Referee: Daniel Stefański (Bydgoszcz)

18 April 2018 Semifinals	Legia Warsaw	2–1	Górnik Zabrze	Polish Army Stadium, Warsaw
20:30 CEST (UTC+02:00)	Kucharczyk 74'; Niezgoda 90'	Report	Hloušek 56' (o.g.)	Attendance: 16,124; Referee: Bartosz Frankowski (Toruń)

Legia Warsaw won 3–2 on aggregate.

2 May 2018 Final	Arka Gdynia	1–2	Legia Warsaw	National Stadium, Warsaw
16:00 CEST (UTC+02:00)	Piesio (red card) 71'; Sołdecki 90+9'	http://www.thenews.pl/1/5/Artykul/361701, Football-Legia-Warsaw-beat-Arka-Gdynia-21-in-Polish-Cup-final	Niezgoda 12'; Cafú 29'	Attendance: 47,037; Referee: Piotr Lasyk (Bytom)

=== Ekstraklasa ===
==== Regular season ====
Win Draw Loss

15 July 2017 1	Górnik Zabrze	3–1	Legia Warsaw	Zabrze, Poland
20:30 CEST (UTC+2)	Suárez 17'; Angulo 43'; Angulo 65'; Wolyniewicz (yellow card) 49'; Rafał Kurzawa (yellow card) 71'	Report	Sadiku 80'; Guilherme (yellow card) 6'; Nagy (yellow card) 70'	Stadium: Ernest Pohl Stadium; Attendance: 22,708; Referee: Tomasz Musiał (Kraków)

22 July 2017 2	Legia Warsaw	1–1	Korona Kielce	Warsaw, Poland
20:30 CEST (UTC+2)	Kucharczyk 79'	Report	Kosakiewicz 85'; Możdżeń (yellow card) 85'; Barry (yellow card) 90+4'	Stadium: Polish Army Stadium; Attendance: 15,041; Referee: Daniel Stefański (Bydgoszcz)

29 July 2017 3	Legia Warsaw	2–0	Sandecja Nowy Sącz	Warsaw, Poland
18:00 CEST (UTC+2)	Hämäläinen 71'; Kucharczyk 90'	Report	Baran (red card) 20'	Stadium: Polish Army Stadium; Attendance: 14,393; Referee: Tomasz Kwiatkowski (Warsaw)

5 August 2017 4	Bruk-Bet Termalica Nieciecza	1–0	Legia Warsaw	Nieciecza, Poland
20:30 CEST (UTC+2)	Piątek 54'; Jovanović (yellow card) 36'; Śpiączka (yellow card) 89'; Kupczak (yellow card) 90+3'	Report	Baran (yellow card) 20'; Mączyński (yellow card) 80'	Stadium: Stadion Termaliki Bruk-Bet; Attendance: 4,561; Referee: Mariusz Złotek (Stalowa Wola)

11 August 2017 5	Legia Warsaw	3–1	Piast Gliwice	Warsaw, Poland
20:30 CEST (UTC+2)	Nagy 17'; Jędrzejczyk (yellow card) 54'; Mączyński 78'; Guilherme 79'; Moulin (yellow card) 90+5'	Report	Sedlar (yellow card) 57'; Dziczek (yellow card) 73'; Mak (yellow card) 86'; Papadopulos 89'; Živec (yellow card) 90+5'	Stadium: Polish Army Stadium; Attendance: 13,708; Referee: Bartosz Frankowski (Toruń)

20 August 2017 6	Wisła Płock	0–1	Legia Warsaw	Płock, Poland
15:30 CEST (UTC+2)		Report		Stadium: Kazimierz Górski Stadium; Attendance: 9,718; Referee: Daniel Stefański (Bydgoszcz)

27 August 2017 7	Legia Warsaw	2–1	Zagłębie Lubin	Warsaw, Poland
18:00 CEST (UTC+2)		Report		Stadium: Polish Army Stadium; Attendance: 14,941; Referee: Bartosz Frankowski (Toruń)

9 September 2017 8	Śląsk Wrocław	2–1	Legia Warsaw	Wrocław, Poland
18:00 CEST (UTC+2)		Report		Stadium: Stadion Miejski; Attendance: 24,086; Referee: Jarosław Przybył (Kluczbork)

17 September 2017 9	Legia Warsaw	1–0	KS Cracovia	Warsaw, Poland
18:00 CEST (UTC+2)		Report		Stadium: Polish Army Stadium; Attendance: 16,650; Referee: Szymon Marciniak (Płock)

24 September 2017 10	Jagiellonia Białystok	1–0	Legia Warsaw	Białystok, Poland
18:00 CEST (UTC+2)		Report		Stadium: Białystok City Stadium; Attendance: 17,894; Referee: Bartosz Frankowski (Toruń)

1 October 2017 11	Lech Poznań	3–0	Legia Warsaw	Poznań, Poland
18:00 CEST (UTC+2)		Report		Stadium: INEA Stadion; Attendance: 36,829; Referee: Szymon Marciniak (Płock)

15 October 2017 12	Legia Warsaw	1–0	Lechia Gdańsk	Warsaw, Poland
18:00 CEST (UTC+2)		Report		Stadium: Polish Army Stadium; Attendance: 18,574; Referee: Daniel Stefański (Bydgoszcz)

22 October 2017 13	Wisła Kraków	0–1	Legia Warsaw	Kraków, Poland
18:00 CEST (UTC+2)		Report		Stadium: Stadion Miejski; Attendance: 33,000; Referee: Bartosz Frankowski (Toruń)

29 October 2017 14	Legia Warsaw	2–0	Arka Gdynia	Warsaw, Poland
18:00 CEST (UTC+2)		Report		Stadium: Polish Army Stadium; Attendance: 14,433; Referee: Mariusz Złotek (Stalowa Wola)

5 November 2017 15	Pogoń Szczecin	1–3	Legia Warsaw	Szczecin, Poland
18:00 CEST (UTC+2)	Drygas 62'	Report	Broź 45' (pen.) Moulin 76' Dvali 82' (og.)	Stadium: Stadion Florian Krygier; Attendance: 6,192; Referee: Tomasz Musiał (Kraków)

19 November 2017 16	Legia Warsaw	1–0	Górnik Zabrze	Warsaw, Poland
18:00 CEST (UTC+2)		Report		Stadium: Polish Army Stadium; Attendance: 24,981; Referee: Jarosław Przybył (Kluczbork)

25 November 2017 17	Korona Kielce	3–2	Legia Warsaw	Kielce, Poland
20:30 CEST (UTC+2)		Report		Attendance: 15,200; Referee: Mariusz Złotek (Stalowa Wola)

2 December 2017 18	Sandecja Nowy Sącz	2–2	Legia Warsaw	Nowy Sącz, Poland
20:30 CEST (UTC+2)		Report		Stadium: Stadion Termaliki Bruk-Bet; Attendance: 2,619; Referee: Tomasz Musiał (Kraków)

9 December 2017 19	Legia Warsaw	3–0	Bruk-Bet Termalica Nieciecza	Warsaw, Poland
20:30 CEST (UTC+2)		Report		Stadium: Polish Army Stadium; Attendance: 11,388; Referee: Piotr Lasyk (Bytom)

12 December 2017 20	Piast Gliwice	0–1	Legia Warsaw	Gliwice, Poland
18:00 CEST (UTC+2)		Report	Guilherme 45' (pen).	Stadium: Stadion Piast; Attendance: 5,243; Referee: Szymon Marciniak (Płock)

16 December 2017 21	Legia Warsaw	0–2	Wisła Płock	Warsaw, Poland
20:30 CEST (UTC+2)		Report		Stadium: Polish Army Stadium; Attendance: 13,721; Referee: Tomasz Musiał (Kraków)

9 February 2018 22	Zagłębie Lubin	2–3	Legia Warsaw	Lublin, Poland
20:30 CEST (UTC+2)	Mareš 46', 90' (pen.)	Report	Niezgoda 16', 67'; Radović 90' (pen.)	Stadium: Stadion Zagłębia Lubin; Attendance: 9,655; Referee: Mariusz Złotek (Stalowa Wola)

16 February 2018 23	Legia Warsaw	4–1	Śląsk Wrocław	Warsaw, Poland
20:30 CEST (UTC+2)	Hämäläinen 23', 30', 33'; Niezgoda 45'	Report	Pich 35'	Stadium: Polish Army Stadium; Attendance: 23,720; Referee: Jarosław Przybył (Kluczbork)

24 February 2018 24	KS Cracovia	0–0	Legia Warsaw	Kraków, Poland
		Report		Attendance: 2,152

27 February 2018 25	Legia Warsaw	0–2	Jagiellonia Białystok	Warsaw, Poland
20:30 CEST (UTC+2)		Report		Stadium: Polish Army Stadium; Attendance: 12,939

4 March 2018 26	Legia Warsaw	2–1	Lech Poznań	Warsaw, Poland
18:00 CEST (UTC+2)		Report		Stadium: Polish Army Stadium; Attendance: 22,899

11 March 2018 27	Lechia Gdańsk	1–3	Legia Warsaw	Gdańsk, Poland
18:00 CEST (UTC+2)		Report		Attendance: 12,021

18 March 2018 28	Legia Warsaw	0–2	Wisła Kraków	Warsaw, Poland
18:00 CEST (UTC+2)		Report		Stadium: Polish Army Stadium; Attendance: 20,236

31 March 2018 29	Arka Gdynia	1–0	Legia Warsaw	Gdynia, Poland
20:30 CEST (UTC+2)		Report		Attendance: 11,762

7 April 2018 30	Legia Warsaw	3–0	Pogoń Szczecin	Warsaw, Poland
18:15 CEST (UTC+2)		Report		Stadium: Polish Army Stadium; Attendance: 18,683

===== League table =====
Pos	Team	Pld	W	D	L	GF	GA	GD	Pts	Qualification
1	Lech Poznań	30	15	10	5	49	23	+26	55	Qualification for the Championship round
2	Jagiellonia Białystok	30	16	6	8	45	36	+9	54 (Note: Head-to-head record: Jagiellonia 1–0 Legia, Legia 0–2 Jagiellonia.)	Qualification for the Championship round
3	Legia Warsaw	30	17	3	10	43	31	+12	54	Qualification for the Championship round
4	Wisła Płock	30	15	4	11	42	35	+7	49	Qualification for the Championship round
5	Górnik Zabrze (Note: Górnik Zabrze were punished after the 26th round with a deduction of three points because of stadium destruction by the fans. The appeal against the penalty has been accepted on 22 March 2018.)	30	12	11	7	56	46	+10	47	Qualification for the Championship round

Source: Ekstraklasa, 90minut
Rules for classification: 1) Points; 2) Head-to-head points; 3) Head-to-head goal difference; 4) Head-to-head goals scored; 5) Head-to-head away goals scored (only if two teams); 6) Goal difference; 7) Goals scored; 8) Fairplay ranking; 9) Draw. (Note: Head-to-head record is used only after all the matches between the teams in question have been played.)

==== Championship round ====
===== Matches =====
14 April 2018 31	Legia Warsaw	0–1	Zagłębie Lubin	Warsaw, Poland
30:20 CEST (UTC+2)		Report		Stadium: Polish Army Stadium; Attendance: 13,081

22 April 2018 32	Wisła Kraków	1–3	Legia Warsaw	Kraków, Poland
18:00 CEST (UTC+2)		Report		Attendance: 23,156

27 April 2018 33	Legia Warsaw	3–1	Korona Kielce	Warsaw, Poland
20:30 CEST (UTC+2)		Report		Stadium: Polish Army Stadium; Attendance: 16,865

6 May 2018 34	Jagiellonia Białystok	0–0	Legia Warsaw	Białystok, Poland
18:00 CEST (UTC+2)		Report		Attendance: 18,763; Referee: Tomasz Musiał (Kraków)

9 May 2018 35	Legia Warsaw	3–2	Wisła Płock	Warsaw, Poland
18:00 CEST (UTC+2)		Report		Stadium: Polish Army Stadium; Attendance: 16,043; Referee: Jarosław Przybył (Kluczbork)

13 May 2018 36	Legia Warsaw	2–0	Górnik Zabrze	Warsaw, Poland
18:00 CEST (UTC+2)		Report		Stadium: Polish Army Stadium; Attendance: 25,980; Referee: Szymon Marciniak (Płock)

20 May 2018 37	Lech Poznań	0–3	Legia Warsaw	Poznań, Poland
18:00 CEST (UTC+2)		Report		Stadium: INEA Stadion; Attendance: 27,617; Referee: Daniel Stefański (Bydgoszcz)

===== League table =====
Pos	Team	Pld	W	D	L	GF	GA	GD	Pts	Qualification
1	Legia Warsaw (C)	37	22	4	11	55	35	+20	70	Qualification for the Champions League first qualifying round
2	Jagiellonia Białystok	37	20	7	10	55	41	+14	67	Qualification for the Europa League second qualifying round
3	Lech Poznań	37	16	12	9	53	34	+19	60	Qualification for the Europa League first qualifying round
4	Górnik Zabrze	37	16	12	9	68	54	+14	60	Qualification for the Europa League first qualifying round
5	Wisła Płock	37	17	6	14	53	45	+8	57	

Source: Ekstraklasa, 90minut
Rules for classification: 1) Points; 2) Points in regular season; 3) Head-to-head points in regular season; 4) Head-to-head goal difference in regular season; 5) Head-to-head goals scored in regular season; 5) Head-to-head away goals scored in regular season (if only two teams); 7) Goal difference; 8) Goals scored; 9) Fairplay ranking; 10) Play-off (only if needed to decide champion, teams for relegation or teams for UEFA competitions).
(C) Champions

=== Champions League ===
==== Second qualifying round ====
12 July 2017	IFK Mariehamn (Finland)	0–3	(Poland) Legia Warsaw	Wiklöf Holding Arena, Mariehamn
20:00		Report	Guilherme 8' (pen.); Nagy 40'; Hämäläinen 44'	Attendance: 1,637; Referee: Andrew Dallas (Scotland)

19 July 2017	Legia Warsaw (Poland)	6–0	(Finland) IFK Mariehamn	Polish Army Stadium, Warsaw
20:45	Guilherme 6'; Kojola 37' (o.g.); Kucharczyk 40', 54' (pen.); Szymański 80'; Michalak 81'	Report		Attendance: 15,843; Referee: Tiago Martins (Portugal)

Legia Warsaw won 9–0 on aggregate.

==== Third qualifying round ====
26 July 2017	Astana (Kazakhstan)	3–1	(Poland) Legia Warsaw	Astana Arena, Astana
16:00	Kabananga 36'; Mayewski 45'; Twumasi 90+4'	Report	Sadiku 79'	Attendance: 26,100; Referee: Tamás Bognár (Hungary)

2 August 2017	Legia Warsaw (Poland)	1–0	(Kazakhstan) Astana	Polish Army Stadium, Warsaw
20:45	Czerwiński 76'	Report		Attendance: 24,937; Referee: Jakob Kehlet (Denmark)

Astana won 3–2 on aggregate.

=== Europa League ===
==== Play-off round ====
17 August 2017	Legia Warsaw (Poland)	1–1	(Moldova) Sheriff Tiraspol	Polish Army Stadium, Warsaw
20:45	Hämäläinen 76'	Report	Bayala 87'	Attendance: 17,732; Referee: Aleksandar Stavrev (Macedonia)

24 August 2017	Sheriff Tiraspol (Moldova)	0–0	(Poland) Legia Warsaw	Sheriff Stadium, Tiraspol
19:00		Report		Attendance: 6,237; Referee: Ivan Bebek (Croatia)

1–1 on aggregate. Sheriff Tiraspol won on away goals.

== Statistics ==
=== Goalscorers ===
As of 10 February 2018.

P	Pos.	Nr	Player	League	Super Cup	Polish Cup	Champions League	Europa League	Total
1	FW	11	(Poland) Jarosław Niezgoda	9	0	0	0	0	9
2	FW	(99)	(Albania) Armando Sadiku	2	–	4	1	0	7
3	MF	22	(Finland) Kasper Hämäläinen	4	0	0	1	1	6
4	MF	(6)	(Brazil) Guilherme	3	0	0	2	0	5
4	MF	18	(Poland) Michał Kucharczyk	3	0	0	2	0	5
4	MF	53	(Poland) Sebastian Szymański	1	0	3	1	0	5
7	MF	(21)	(Hungary) Dominik Nagy	1	0	1	1	0	3
7	MF	(75)	(France) Thibault Moulin	2	1	0	0	0	3
7	Own goal			1	0	1	1	0	3
10	DF	5	(Poland) Maciej Dąbrowski	1	0	1	0	0	2
10	DF	(7)	(Portugal) Hildeberto Pereira	0	–	2	0	0	2
10	MF	8	(Italy) Cristian Pasquato	1	–	1	0	0	2
10	DF	28	(Poland) Łukasz Broź	1	0	1	0	0	2
10	MF	31	(Poland) Krzysztof Mączyński	1	0	1	0	0	2
15	DF	(4)	(Poland) Jakub Czerwiński	0	0	0	1	0	1
15	MF	(17)	(Poland) Konrad Michalak	0	0	0	1	0	1
15	MF	32	(Serbia) Miroslav Radović	1	0	0	0	0	1
