= Frederik Helstrup =

Danish footballer (born 1993)

Personal information
- Full name: Frederik Helstrup Jensen
- Date of birth: 16 March 1993 (age 33)
- Place of birth: Copenhagen, Denmark
- Height: 1.88 m (6 ft 2 in)
- Position: Centre-back

Youth career
- Gladsaxe-Hero BK
- Virum-Sorgenfri BK
- Lyngby

Senior career*
Years	Team	Apps	(Gls)
2011–2013	Lyngby	35	(3)
2013–2015	Horsens	35	(1)
2015	→ Helsingborgs IF (loan)	13	(0)
2015–2017	Helsingborgs IF	50	(2)
2017–2020	Arka Gdynia	74	(1)
2020–2022	Almere City	53	(3)
2022–2024	Helsingør	56	(0)

International career
2010–2011	Denmark U18	8	(0)
2011–2012	Denmark U19	9	(2)
2012	Denmark U20	1	(0)
- * Club domestic league appearances and goals as of 3 June 2024

Frederik Helstrup Jensen (born 16 March 1993) is a Danish retired professional footballer.

== Club career ==
Helstrup started his career as youth prospect of the amateur clubs Gladsaxe-Hero BK, Virum-Sorgenfri BK and later professional club Lyngby Boldklub. In the summer of 2011, Lyngby's coaching staff promoted him to the first team squad. On 14 August 2011, he made his Superliga debut in a 1–1 draw against AC Horsens. In the 2011–12 season, Lyngby relegated to the Danish 1st Division, where he played for another year. In September 2013, he signed a three-year contract with AC Horsens, for whom he made 35 appearances at the 1st Division.

In March 2015, Helstrup was loaned for four months to Swedish club Helsingborgs IF, coached by Henrik Larsson. On 4 April 2015, he made his Allsvenskan debut in a goalless match against Kalmar FF. Before the end of the loan period, the club decided to sign Helstrup on a permanent transfer. For two consecutive seasons he was a starter in the defense. After the 2016 season ended, Helsingborgs IF suffered relegation to Superettan, after losing 2–3 to Halmstads BK. Helstrup played in both matches, scoring an own goal in the first one.

In the summer of 2017, he moved to Polish Ekstraklasa club Arka Gdynia led by head coach Leszek Ojrzyński. In the seventh matchday of the 2017–18 season, he made his debut in a 3–0 defeat to Lech Poznań. In the same season, Helstrup reached the finals of the Polish Cup with Arka Gdynia. In 2018, he won the Polish Super Cup with Arka after a 3–2 victory over Legia Warsaw.

In 2020, Helstrup moved to Dutch Eerste Divisie club Almere City FC as a free agent, where he signed a two-year contract. After eight years abroad, Helstrup returned to his homeland on 13 July 2022, when he signed a two-year deal with Danish 1st Division side FC Helsingør. At the end of the 2023–24 season, which ended with relegation to the Danish 2nd Division for Helsingør, Helstrup left the club.

In October 2024, at the age of 31, Helstrup announced his retirement from football.

== Honours ==
Arka Gdynia

- Polish Super Cup: 2018
