= 2018 Polish Super Cup =

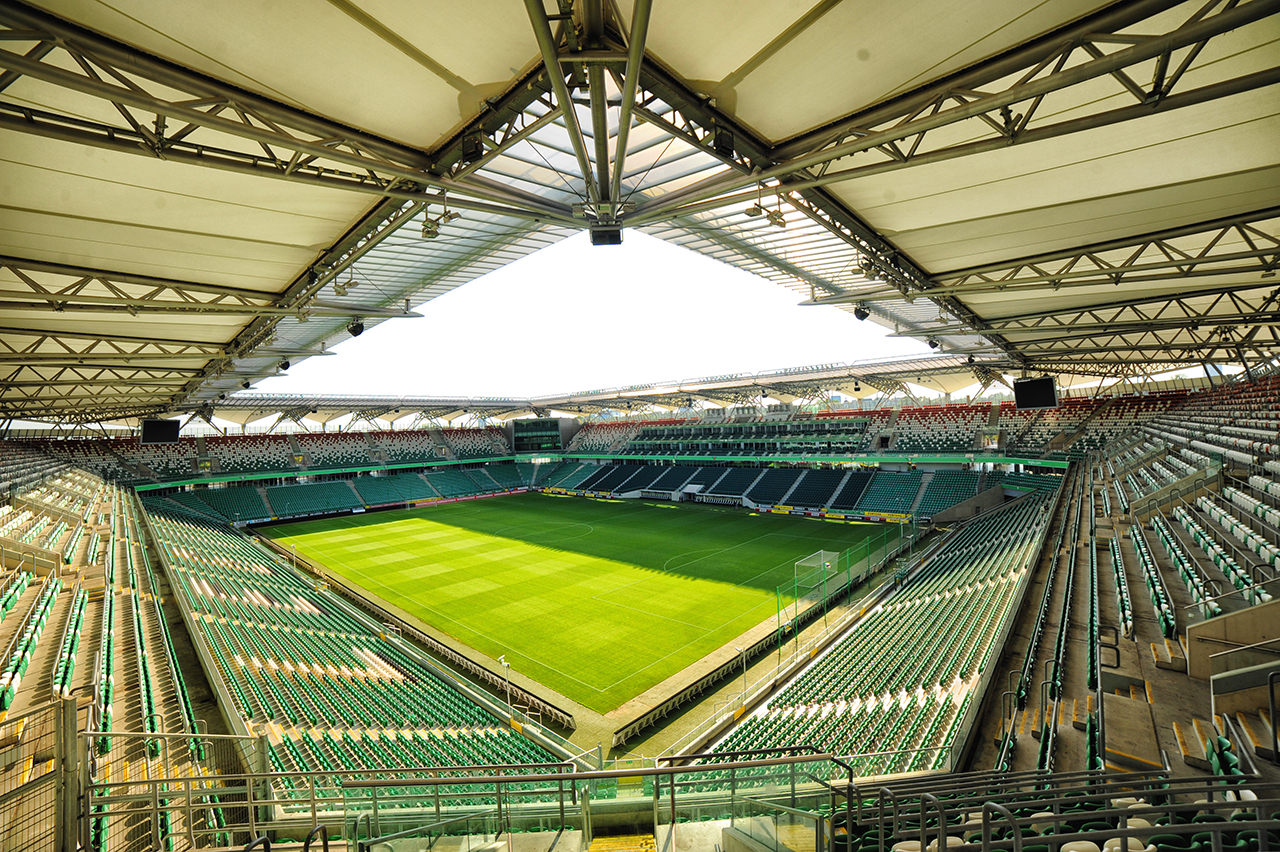
- The Polish Army Stadium in Warsaw hosted the final.
Legia Warsaw	Arka Gdynia
2	3
- Date: 14 July 2018
- Venue: Stadion Wojska Polskiego, Warsaw
- Referee: Mariusz Złotek (Stalowa Wola)
- Attendance: 17,419

The 2018 Polish Super Cup was the 27th Polish Super Cup, an annual Polish football match played between the reigning winners of the Ekstraklasa and Polish Cup. It was held on 14 July 2018 between the 2017–18 Ekstraklasa and 2017–18 Polish Cup winners Legia Warsaw and the 2017–18 Polish Cup runners-up Arka Gdynia at Legia's home, the Stadion Wojska Polskiego in Warsaw. Arka played its second Super Cup match, while Legia played its 13th and sixth consecutive Super Cup. It was a rematch of the previous Super Cup edition, during which Arka ended their first Super Cup appearance with a victory.

Arka won 3–2 to retain their Super Cup trophy, while Legia lost the Super Cup match for the sixth consecutive time.

== Match ==
14 July 2018
20:30 CEST (UTC+02:00)

Legia Warsaw	2–3	Arka Gdynia
Bohdanov 2' (o.g.); Philipps 30'	90minut.pl Soccerway	Zarandia 20' Bohdanov 38' Janota 45+3'

Stadion Wojska Polskiego, Warsaw
Attendance: 17,419
Referee: Mariusz Złotek (Stalowa Wola)

Legia Warsaw	Arka Gdynia

GK	1	(Poland) Arkadiusz Malarz
SW	34	(Spain) Iñaki Astiz
CB	44	(France) William Rémy
CB	4	(Poland) Mateusz Wieteska
RWB	20	(Montenegro) Marko Vešović	(yellow card) 44'	(substituted off) 46'
LWB	16	(Poland) Michał Kucharczyk	(yellow card) 90+2'
CM	29	(Poland) Krzysztof Mączyński	(yellow card) 43'	(substituted off) 57'
CM	53	(Poland) Sebastian Szymański	(yellow card) 62'	(substituted off) 82'
CM	6	(Luxembourg) Chris Philipps	(yellow card) 53'
CF	32	(Serbia) Miroslav Radović (c)		(substituted off) 57'
CF	19	(Guinea) José Kanté	(yellow card) 27'	(substituted off) 73'
Substitutes:
GK	33	(Poland) Radosław Cierzniak
DF	14	(Czech Republic) Adam Hloušek		(substituted on) 46'
DF	23	(Poland) Mateusz Żyro
MF	21	(Hungary) Dominik Nagy		(substituted on) 73'
MF	22	(Finland) Kasper Hämäläinen		(substituted on) 82'
MF	26	(Portugal) Cafú		(substituted on) 57'
FW	27	(Spain) Carlitos		(substituted on) 57'
Manager:
(Croatia) Dean Klafurić

GK	1	(Latvia) Pāvels Šteinbors
RB	33	(Poland) Damian Zbozień
CB	23	(Croatia) Luka Marić	(yellow card) 31'	(substituted off) 60'
CB	6	(Denmark) Frederik Helstrup
LB	17	(Poland) Adam Marciniak
CM	14	(Poland) Michał Nalepa	(yellow card) 79'
CM	90	(Ukraine) Andriy Bohdanov		(substituted off) 78'
RW	10	(Georgia (country)) Luka Zarandia		(substituted off) 88'
AM	22	(Poland) Michał Janota		(substituted off) 72'
LW	20	(Slovenia) Goran Cvijanović		(substituted off) 46'
CF	92	(Bulgaria) Aleksandar Kolev
Substitutes:
GK	97	(Poland) Marcin Staniszewski
DF	2	(Poland) Tadeusz Socha		(substituted on) 88'
DF	3	(Democratic Republic of the Congo) Christian Maghoma		(substituted on) 60'
DF	4	(Poland) Dawid Sołdecki		(substituted on) 78'
DF	44	(Poland) Robert Sulewski
MF	18	(Poland) Karol Danielak		(substituted on) 46'
FW	11	(Poland) Rafał Siemaszko		(substituted on) 72'
Manager:
(Poland) Zbigniew Smółka

Match rules

- 90 minutes.
- Penalty shoot-out if scores still level.
- Seven named substitutes.
- Maximum of five substitutions.

== See also ==
- 2018–19 Ekstraklasa
- 2018–19 Polish Cup
