= 2017–18 Ekstraklasa =

92nd season of top-tier football league in Poland

Ekstraklasa
- Season: 2017–18
- Dates: 14 July 2017 – 20 May 2018
- Champions: Legia Warsaw (13th title)
- Relegated: Termalica; Sandecja
- Champions League: Legia Warsaw
- Europa League: Jagiellonia Białystok; Lech Poznań; Górnik Zabrze
- Matches: 296
- Goals: 776 (2.62 per match)
- Top goalscorer: Carlitos (24 goals)
- Biggest home win: Arka 5–0 Sandecja (25 November 2017)
- Biggest away win: Lechia 0–5 Korona (30 October 2017)
- Highest scoring: 18 games: Lech 5–1 Piast (30 July 2017); Korona 4–2 Cracovia (31 July 2017); Cracovia 3–3 Górnik (18 August 2017); Lechia 3–3 Jagiellonia (18 September 2017); Górnik 3–3 Korona (20 October 2017); Lechia 3–3 Lech (21 October 2017); Zagłebie 4–2 Termalica (2 December 2017); Pogoń 3–3 Zagłebie (10 December 2017); Jagiellonia 5–1 Korona (12 December 2017); Wisła P. 4–2 Górnik (9 February 2018); Sandecja 3–3 Korona (16 February 2018); Lech 5–1 Jagiellonia (11 March 2018); Termalica 2–4 Pogoń (17 March 2018); Lechia 4–2 Arka (7 April 2018); Arka 1–5 Piast (27 April 2018); Lech 2–4 Górnik (28 April 2018); Cracovia 4–2 Termalica (29 April 2018); Cracovia 3–3 Śląsk Wrocław (4 May 2018)
- Longest winning run: 5 matches Legia Warsaw; Jagiellonia Białystok
- Longest unbeaten run: 9 matches Górnik Zabrze; Śląsk Wrocław; Korona Kielce
- Longest winless run: 22 matches Sandecja Nowy Sącz
- Longest losing run: 5 matches Pogoń Szczecin; Arka Gdynia
- Highest attendance: 36,941; Lech 3–1 Górnik (7 April 2018)
- Lowest attendance: 312; Sandecja 0–1 Zagłębie (27 February 2018)
- Total attendance: 2,802,483
- Average attendance: 9,468 ▼1.5%

The 2017–18 Ekstraklasa (also known as Lotto Ekstraklasa due to its sponsorship by Totalizator Sportowy, Polish lottery) was the 92nd season of the Polish Football Championship, the 84th season of the highest tier domestic division in the Polish football league system since its establishment in 1927 and the 10th season of the Ekstraklasa under its current title. The league was operated by the Ekstraklasa SA.

The season started on 14 July 2017 and concluded on 20 May 2018. It is the first Ekstraklasa season to use VAR. After the 21st matchday the league went on a winter break between 18 December 2017 and 9 February 2018. The regular season was played as a round-robin tournament. A total of 16 teams participated, 14 of which competed in the league during the 2016–17 season, while the remaining two were promoted from the I liga after the 2016–17 season. The fixtures were announced on 8 June 2017.

Each team played a total of 30 matches, half at home and half away. After the 30th round (in the beginning of April 2018), the league split into two groups: championship round (top eight teams) and relegation round (bottom eight teams). Each team played 7 more games (teams ranked 1-4 and 9-12 played four times at home). So, finally each team played a total of 37 matches. The team at the top of the Championship round wins the league title. The two teams at the bottom of the Relegation round are demoted to I liga for the 2018–19 season. This was the fifth season to take place since the new playoff structure has been introduced.

The defending champions were Legia Warsaw, who won their 12th Polish title the previous season.

Legia successfully defended their title, sealing the league trophy for a 13th time in dramatic circumstances as their deciding game against Lech Poznan was abandoned due to flares and pitch invasions by Lech fans (after Legia went 2-0 ahead). Legia were awarded the tie 3-0 and three points secured 1st place.

== Teams ==
Sixteen teams will compete in the league – the top fourteen teams from the previous season, as well as two teams promoted from the I liga. Sandecja Nowy Sącz were promoted to the Ekstraklasa for the first time. Górnik Zabrze returned to Ekstraklasa after a one-year absence.

=== Stadiums and locations ===
Note: Table lists in alphabetical order.

Team	Location	Venue	Capacity
Arka Gdynia	Gdynia	Stadion Miejski	15,139
Bruk-Bet Termalica Nieciecza	Nieciecza	Stadion Termaliki	4,653
Cracovia	Kraków	Stadion im. Józefa Piłsudskiego	15,016
Górnik Zabrze	Zabrze	Stadion im. Ernesta Pohla	24,413^{2}
Jagiellonia Białystok	Białystok	Stadion Miejski	22,432
Korona Kielce	Kielce	Kolporter Arena	15,550
Lech Poznań	Poznań	INEA Stadion	43,269
Lechia Gdańsk	Gdańsk	Stadion Energa Gdańsk	43,615
Legia Warsaw	Warsaw	Stadion Wojska Polskiego	31,800
Piast Gliwice	Gliwice	Arena Gliwice	10,037
Pogoń Szczecin	Szczecin	Stadion im. Floriana Krygiera	18,027
Sandecja Nowy Sącz	Nieciecza	Stadion Termaliki	4,653^{1}
Śląsk Wrocław	Wrocław	Stadion Wrocław	42,771
Wisła Kraków	Kraków	Stadion im. Henryka Reymana	33,326
Wisła Płock	Płock	Stadion im. Kazimierza Górskiego	12,800
Zagłębie Lubin	Lubin	Stadion Zagłębia	16,068

1. Sandecja Nowy Sącz will play their home games in Nieciecza until their home ground (Stadion im. Ojca Władysława Augustynka) fulfills license requirements.
2. Upgrading to 31,871.

Arka	Termalica	Cracovia	Górnik Zabrze	Jagiellonia	Korona
Stadion GOSiR	Stadion Bruk-Bet	Stadion im. Józefa Piłsudskiego	Stadion im. Ernesta Pohla	Stadion Jagiellonii	Kolporter Arena
Capacity: 15,139	Capacity: 4,666	Capacity: 15,016	Capacity: 24,413	Capacity: 22,432	Capacity: 15,550
Lech	Location of teams in 2017–18 Ekstraklasa				Lechia
INEA Stadion	Location of teams in 2017–18 Ekstraklasa				Stadion Energa Gdańsk
Capacity: 43,269	Location of teams in 2017–18 Ekstraklasa				Capacity: 43,615
Legia	Location of teams in 2017–18 Ekstraklasa				Piast
Stadion Wojska Polskiego	Location of teams in 2017–18 Ekstraklasa				Arena Gliwice
Capacity: 31,800	Location of teams in 2017–18 Ekstraklasa				Capacity: 10,037
Pogoń	Sandecja	Śląsk	Wisła Kraków	Wisła Płock	Zagłębie
Stadion im. Floriana Krygiera	Stadion Bruk-Bet	Stadion Wrocław	Stadion im. Henryka Reymana	Stadion im. Kazimierza Górskiego	Stadion Zagłębia
Capacity: 18,027	Capacity: 4,666	Capacity: 42,771	Capacity: 33,326	Capacity: 12,800	Capacity: 16,068

Location of teams in the Katowice urban area

=== Personnel and kits ===
Team	Chairman	Head coach	Captain	Manufacturer	Sponsors
Arka Gdynia	(Poland) Wojciech Pertkiewicz	(Poland) Leszek Ojrzyński	(Poland) Krzysztof Sobieraj	Adidas	Gdynia
Bruk-Bet Termalica Nieciecza	(Poland) Danuta Witkowska	(Poland) Jacek Zieliński	(Poland) Łukasz Piątek	Adidas	Bruk-Bet
Cracovia	(Poland) Janusz Filipiak	(Poland) Michał Probierz	(Bosnia and Herzegovina) Miroslav Čovilo	Puma	Comarch
Górnik Zabrze	(Poland) Bartosz Sarnowski	(Poland) Marcin Brosz	(Poland) Szymon Matuszek	Adidas	Allianz
Jagiellonia Białystok	(Poland) Cezary Kulesza	(Poland) Ireneusz Mamrot	(Poland) Rafał Grzyb	Erreà	STS
Korona Kielce	(Poland) Krzysztof Zając	(Italy) Gino Lettieri	(Czech Republic) Radek Dejmek	Puma	Lewiatan
Lech Poznań	(Poland) Karol Klimczak	(Poland) Rafał Ulatowski	(Poland) Maciej Gajos	Nike	Aforti
Lechia Gdańsk	(Poland) Adam Mandziara	(Poland) Piotr Stokowiec	(Poland) Sebastian Mila	New Balance	Energa
Legia Warsaw	(Poland) Dariusz Mioduski	(Croatia) Dean Klafurić	(Serbia) Miroslav Radović	Adidas	Fortuna
Piast Gliwice	(Poland) Paweł Żelem	(Poland) Waldemar Fornalik	(Spain) Gerard Badía	Joma	Gliwice
Pogoń Szczecin	(Poland) Jarosław Mroczek	(Croatia) Kosta Runjaić	(Poland) Adam Frączczak	Zina	Grupa Azoty
Sandecja Nowy Sącz	(Poland) Grzegorz Haslik	(Poland) Kazimierz Moskal	(Poland) Dawid Szufryn	Saller	Zakłady Mięsne Szubryt
Śląsk Wrocław	(Poland) Michał Bobowiec	(Poland) Tadeusz Pawłowski	(Poland) Piotr Celeban	Adidas	forBET
Wisła Kraków	(Poland) Marzena Sarapata	(Spain) Joan Carrillo	(Poland) Arkadiusz Głowacki	Adidas	LV Bet
Wisła Płock	(Poland) Jacek Kruszewski	(Poland) Jerzy Brzęczek	(Poland) Bartłomiej Sielewski	Adidas	PKN Orlen, Budmat
Zagłębie Lubin	(Poland) Robert Sadowski	(Poland) Mariusz Lewandowski	(Poland) Konrad Forenc	Nike	KGHM

=== Managerial changes ===
Team	Outgoing manager	Manner of departure	Date of vacancy	Position in table	Incoming manager	Date of appointment
Korona Kielce	(Poland) Maciej Bartoszek	Mutual consent	4 June 2017	Pre-season	(Italy) Gino Lettieri	1 July 2017
Pogoń Szczecin	(Poland) Kazimierz Moskal	End of contract	30 June 2017	Pre-season	(Poland) Maciej Skorża	1 July 2017
Jagiellonia Białystok	(Poland) Michał Probierz	Mutual consent	4 June 2017	Pre-season	(Poland) Ireneusz Mamrot	12 June 2017
Bruk-Bet Termalica Nieciecza	(Poland) Marcin Węglewski	Became assistant	13 June 2017	Pre-season	(Poland) Mariusz Rumak	13 June 2017
Cracovia	(Poland) Jacek Zieliński	Mutual consent	19 June 2017	Pre-season	(Poland) Michał Probierz	21 June 2017
Wisła Płock	(Poland) Marcin Kaczmarek	Mutual consent	5 July 2017	Pre-season	(Poland) Jerzy Brzęczek	11 July 2017
Legia Warsaw	(Poland) Jacek Magiera	Sacked	13 September 2017	5th	(Croatia) Romeo Jozak	13 September 2017
Piast Gliwice	(Poland) Dariusz Wdowczyk	Sacked	19 September 2017	14th	(Poland) Waldemar Fornalik	19 September 2017
Bruk-Bet Termalica Nieciecza	(Poland) Mariusz Rumak	Sacked	19 September 2017	16th	(Poland) Maciej Bartoszek	20 September 2017
Lechia Gdańsk	(Poland) Piotr Nowak	Taking over as sports director	27 September 2017	12th	(Wales) Adam Owen	27 September 2017
Pogoń Szczecin	(Poland) Maciej Skorża	Sacked	30 October 2017	16th	(Poland) Rafał Janas (interim)	30 October 2017
Pogoń Szczecin	(Poland) Rafał Janas	Caretaking spell over	6 November 2017	16th	(Croatia) Kosta Runjaić	6 November 2017
Zagłębie Lubin	(Poland) Piotr Stokowiec	Sacked	27 November 2017	8th	(Poland) Mariusz Lewandowski	28 November 2017
Wisła Kraków	(Spain) Kiko Ramírez	Sacked	10 December 2017	8th	(Spain) Joan Carrillo	1 January 2018
Sandecja Nowy Sącz	(Poland) Radosław Mroczkowski	Sacked	10 December 2017	14th	(Poland) Kazimierz Moskal	19 December 2017
Śląsk Wrocław	(Poland) Jan Urban	Sacked	19 February 2018	10th	(Poland) Tadeusz Pawłowski	19 February 2018
Bruk-Bet Termalica Nieciecza	(Poland) Maciej Bartoszek	Sacked	20 February 2018	15th	(Poland) Jacek Zieliński	20 February 2018
Lechia Gdańsk	(Wales) Adam Owen	Sacked	3 March 2018	12th	(Poland) Piotr Stokowiec	5 March 2018
Legia Warsaw	(Croatia) Romeo Jozak	Sacked	14 April 2018	3rd	(Croatia) Dean Klafurić	14 April 2018
Lech Poznań	(Croatia) Nenad Bjelica	Sacked	10 May 2018	3rd	(Poland) Rafał Ulatowski (interim)	10 May 2018

== Regular season ==
=== League table ===
Pos	Team	Pld	W	D	L	GF	GA	GD	Pts	Qualification
1	Lech Poznań	30	15	10	5	49	23	+26	55	Qualification for the Championship round
2	Jagiellonia Białystok	30	16	6	8	45	36	+9	54 (Note: Head-to-head record: Jagiellonia 1–0 Legia, Legia 0–2 Jagiellonia.)	Qualification for the Championship round
3	Legia Warsaw	30	17	3	10	43	31	+12	54	Qualification for the Championship round
4	Wisła Płock	30	15	4	11	42	35	+7	49	Qualification for the Championship round
5	Górnik Zabrze (Note: Górnik Zabrze were punished after the 26th round with a deduction of three points because of stadium destruction by the fans. The appeal against the penalty has been accepted on 22 March 2018.)	30	12	11	7	56	46	+10	47	Qualification for the Championship round
6	Korona Kielce	30	11	12	7	44	37	+7	45	Qualification for the Championship round
7	Wisła Kraków	30	12	8	10	41	36	+5	44	Qualification for the Championship round
8	Zagłębie Lubin	30	10	13	7	39	33	+6	43	Qualification for the Championship round
9	Arka Gdynia	30	10	10	10	38	32	+6	40	Qualification for the Relegation round
10	Cracovia	30	10	9	11	40	40	0	39	Qualification for the Relegation round
11	Śląsk Wrocław	30	7	10	13	35	48	−13	31 (Note: Head-to-head record: Śląsk 3–0 Pogoń, Pogoń 3–2 Śląsk.)	Qualification for the Relegation round
12	Pogoń Szczecin	30	8	7	15	34	48	−14	31	Qualification for the Relegation round
13	Piast Gliwice	30	6	12	12	28	38	−10	30 (Note: Head-to-head record: Piast 1–2 Lechia, Lechia 0–2 Piast.)	Qualification for the Relegation round
14	Lechia Gdańsk (Note: Lechia Gdańsk were punished with a deduction of one point for failing with licensing requirements.)	30	7	10	13	39	51	−12	30	Qualification for the Relegation round
15	Bruk-Bet Termalica Nieciecza	30	7	8	15	32	52	−20	29	Qualification for the Relegation round
16	Sandecja Nowy Sącz	30	4	13	13	27	46	−19	25	Qualification for the Relegation round

Source: Ekstraklasa, 90minut
Rules for classification: 1) Points; 2) Head-to-head points; 3) Head-to-head goal difference; 4) Head-to-head goals scored; 5) Head-to-head away goals scored (only if two teams); 6) Goal difference; 7) Goals scored; 8) Fairplay ranking; 9) Draw. (Note: Head-to-head record is used only after all the matches between the teams in question have been played.)

=== Positions by round ===
Team ╲ Round	1	2	3	4	5	6	7	8	9	10	11	12	13	14	15	16	17	18	19	20	21	22	23	24	25	26	27	28	29	30
Lech	9	13	6	4	4	4	1	1	1	3	2	1	1	3	5	6	4	5	4	4	2	3	3	3	3	3	3	3	2	1
Jagiellonia	5	1	1	3	2	2	4	4	6	4	4	4	7	5	3	4	6	4	3	3	4	2	2	1	1	1	1	1	1	2
Legia	14	14	8	10	7	5	3	5	4	6	8	6	4	2	2	1	2	2	2	1	1	1	1	2	2	2	2	2	3	3
Wisła P.	15	9	10	13	8	10	13	14	11	11	7	9	5	9	8	11	11	10	9	9	9	6	5	7	7	6	5	5	5	4
Górnik	1	6	3	5	5	6	6	2	2	1	1	2	2	1	1	2	1	1	1	2	3	4	4	4	4	4	4	4	4	5
Korona	12	12	7	7	9	13	9	8	9	8	9	7	8	6	4	5	3	3	5	7	7	5	6	5	5	5	6	7	6	6
Wisła K.	4	1	4	2	1	3	5	6	5	7	6	5	6	7	6	3	5	6	8	6	8	9	7	6	6	8	7	6	7	7
Zagłębie	5	3	2	1	3	1	2	3	3	2	3	3	3	4	7	7	8	7	6	8	5	7	9	8	8	7	8	8	8	8
Arka	2	4	5	6	6	9	12	10	10	10	11	11	9	10	10	8	7	8	7	5	6	8	8	9	9	9	9	10	9	9
Cracovia	7	5	9	14	14	15	16	15	15	16	16	13	14	15	14	15	12	12	12	15	12	11	11	11	10	10	10	9	10	10
Śląsk	15	16	13	12	13	11	8	7	8	5	5	8	11	8	9	10	9	11	11	11	10	10	10	10	11	11	11	11	12	11
Pogoń	11	8	12	15	15	8	11	12	13	13	13	15	16	16	16	16	16	16	16	16	16	15	16	15	15	13	14	13	11	12
Piast	7	11	16	16	16	16	10	13	14	15	15	16	15	14	15	14	15	15	13	14	15	16	13	13	13	14	12	12	13	13
Lechia	2	7	11	9	10	12	14	11	12	12	12	12	12	12	12	9	10	9	10	10	11	12	12	12	12	12	13	14	15	14
Nieciecza	12	15	15	11	11	14	15	16	16	14	14	14	13	13	13	13	13	14	15	12	13	13	15	14	14	15	15	15	14	15
Sandecja	9	10	14	8	11	7	7	9	7	9	10	10	10	11	11	12	14	13	14	13	14	14	14	16	16	16	16	16	16	16

=== Results ===
Home \ Away	ARK	BBT	CRA	GÓR	JAG	KOR	LPO	LGD	LEG	PIA	POG	SAN	ŚLĄ	WIS	WPŁ	ZAG
Arka Gdynia	—	4–0	1–1	1–0	4–1	0–0	0–0	0–1	1–0	0–0	0–3	5–0	2–0	3–1	1–1	1–1
Nieciecza	1–1	—	2–0	1–2	0–1	0–3	1–3	2–1	1–0	2–1	2–4	1–0	2–1	3–3	1–2	1–1
Cracovia	2–1	1–1	—	3–3	1–1	2–2	0–2	2–1	0–0	1–1	3–0	2–1	2–1	1–4	1–3	2–2
Górnik Zabrze	1–1	3–0	0–4	—	3–1	3–3	3–1	1–1	3–1	1–0	0–0	2–2	2–2	3–2	4–0	2–2
Jagiellonia Białystok	3–2	0–0	1–0	2–1	—	5–1	1–1	4–1	1–0	0–1	1–0	1–3	1–1	2–0	1–3	3–1
Korona Kielce	0–3	2–1	4–2	2–2	2–3	—	1–0	1–0	3–2	1–1	0–0	1–0	3–0	2–1	2–0	0–1
Lech Poznań	3–0	3–1	1–0	3–1	5–1	1–0	—	3–0	3–0	5–1	2–0	0–0	2–1	1–1	2–1	1–1
Lechia Gdańsk	4–2	2–2	0–1	1–1	3–3	0–5	3–3	—	1–3	0–2	1–3	2–3	3–1	1–1	3–0	1–0
Legia Warsaw	2–0	3–0	1–0	1–0	0–2	1–1	2–1	1–0	—	3–1	3–0	2–0	4–1	0–2	0–2	2–1
Piast Gliwice	0–1	1–1	1–0	0–3	0–2	2–0	0–0	1–2	0–1	—	1–2	2–2	1–1	0–0	2–1	0–0
Pogoń Szczecin	1–0	2–3	0–3	1–2	0–1	0–0	0–0	0–0	1–3	2–2	—	4–1	3–2	1–2	2–1	3–3
Sandecja Nowy Sącz	0–0	1–0	1–1	1–2	0–1	3–3	0–0	2–2	2–2	0–3	2–1	—	1–1	0–0	0–1	0–1
Śląsk Wrocław	1–2	1–1	2–1	1–1	1–0	1–1	2–0	3–2	2–1	2–2	3–0	0–0	—	0–2	1–1	1–0
Wisła Kraków	3–2	1–0	2–1	2–3	0–0	1–1	1–3	1–1	0–1	2–0	1–0	3–0	3–1	—	0–1	1–2
Wisła Płock	2–0	1–0	0–1	4–2	1–2	2–0	1–0	0–2	0–1	1–0	3–1	2–2	4–1	0–1	—	2–0
Zagłębie Lubin	0–0	4–2	1–2	3–2	1–0	0–0	0–0	0–0	2–3	2–2	3–0	1–0	1–0	3–0	2–2	—

Source: 90minut.pl
Legend: Blue = home team win; Yellow = draw; Red = away team win.
For upcoming matches, an "a" indicates there is an article about the rivalry between the two participants.

== Play-offs ==
=== Championship round ===
==== League table ====
Pos	Team	Pld	W	D	L	GF	GA	GD	Pts	Qualification
1	Legia Warsaw (C)	37	22	4	11	55	35	+20	70	Qualification for the Champions League first qualifying round
2	Jagiellonia Białystok	37	20	7	10	55	41	+14	67	Qualification for the Europa League second qualifying round
3	Lech Poznań	37	16	12	9	53	34	+19	60	Qualification for the Europa League first qualifying round
4	Górnik Zabrze	37	16	12	9	68	54	+14	60	Qualification for the Europa League first qualifying round
5	Wisła Płock	37	17	6	14	53	45	+8	57	
6	Wisła Kraków	37	15	10	12	51	42	+9	55	
7	Zagłębie Lubin	37	13	13	11	45	42	+3	52	
8	Korona Kielce	37	12	13	12	49	54	−5	49	

Source: Ekstraklasa, 90minut
Rules for classification: 1) Points; 2) Points in regular season; 3) Head-to-head points in regular season; 4) Head-to-head goal difference in regular season; 5) Head-to-head goals scored in regular season; 5) Head-to-head away goals scored in regular season (if only two teams); 7) Goal difference; 8) Goals scored; 9) Fairplay ranking; 10) Play-off (only if needed to decide champion, teams for relegation or teams for UEFA competitions).
(C) Champions

==== Positions by round ====
Team ╲ Round	30	31	32	33	34	35	36	37
Legia	3	3	3	1	1	1	1	1
Jagiellonia	2	2	2	3	3	2	2	2
Lech	1	1	1	2	2	3	3	3
Górnik	5	5	5	5	4	4	5	4
Wisła P.	4	4	4	4	5	5	4	5
Wisła K.	7	8	8	8	6	6	6	6
Zagłębie	8	7	7	6	7	8	8	7
Korona	6	6	6	7	8	7	7	8

==== Results ====
Home \ Away	LPO	JAG	LEG	WPŁ	GÓR	KOR	WIS	ZAG
Lech Poznań	—	0–2	0–3	—	2–4	0–1	—	—
Jagiellonia Białystok	—	—	0–0	2–1	1–2	—	0–1	—
Legia Warsaw	—	—	—	3–2	2–0	3–1	—	0–1
Wisła Płock	0–0	—	—	—	—	4–1	2–2	1–2
Górnik Zabrze	—	—	—	0–1	—	2–2	2–0	—
Korona Kielce	—	0–3	—	—	—	—	0–3	0–2
Wisła Kraków	1–1	—	0–1	—	—	—	—	3–0
Zagłębie Lubin	0–1	1–2	—	—	0–2	—	—	—

Source: 90minut.pl
Legend: Blue = home team win; Yellow = draw; Red = away team win.
For upcoming matches, an "a" indicates there is an article about the rivalry between the two participants.

=== Relegation round ===
==== League table ====
Pos	Team	Pld	W	D	L	GF	GA	GD	Pts	Qualification
9	Cracovia	37	13	11	13	51	52	−1	50	
10	Śląsk Wrocław	37	13	11	13	50	54	−4	50	
11	Pogoń Szczecin	37	12	9	16	46	54	−8	45	
12	Arka Gdynia	37	11	10	16	46	48	−2	43	
13	Lechia Gdańsk	37	9	13	15	46	58	−12	39	
14	Piast Gliwice	37	8	13	16	40	48	−8	37	
15	Bruk-Bet Termalica Nieciecza (R)	37	9	9	19	39	66	−27	36	Relegation to I liga
16	Sandecja Nowy Sącz (R)	37	6	15	16	34	54	−20	33	Relegation to I liga

Source: Ekstraklasa, 90minut
Rules for classification: 1) Points; 2) Points in regular season; 3) Head-to-head points in regular season; 4) Head-to-head goal difference in regular season; 5) Head-to-head goals scored in regular season; 5) Head-to-head away goals scored in regular season (if only two teams); 7) Goal difference; 8) Goals scored; 9) Fairplay ranking; 10) Play-off (only if needed to decide champion, teams for relegation or teams for UEFA competitions).
(R) Relegated

==== Positions by round ====
Team ╲ Round	30	31	32	33	34	35	36	37
Cracovia	10	9	9	9	9	9	9	9
Śląsk	11	11	11	11	10	10	10	10
Pogoń	12	12	12	12	11	12	12	11
Arka	9	10	10	10	12	11	11	12
Lechia	14	13	13	14	14	13	13	13
Piast	13	14	14	13	13	14	15	14
Termalica	15	15	15	15	15	15	14	15
Sandecja	16	16	16	16	16	16	16	16

==== Results ====
Home \ Away	ARK	CRA	ŚLĄ	POG	PIA	LGD	BBT	SAN
Arka Gdynia	—	2–0	0–1	—	1–5	1–2	—	—
Cracovia	—	—	3–3	1–4	2–1	—	4–2	—
Śląsk Wrocław	—	—	—	2–0	3–1	3–1	—	1–0
Pogoń Szczecin	3–2	—	—	—	—	1–1	2–0	2–0
Piast Gliwice	—	—	—	0–0	—	0–2	4–0	—
Lechia Gdańsk	—	0–0	—	—	—	—	0–1	1–1
Bruk-Bet Termalica Nieciecza	2–1	—	1–2	—	—	—	—	1–1
Sandecja Nowy Sącz	3–1	0–1	—	—	2–1	—	—	—

Source: 90minut.pl
Legend: Blue = home team win; Yellow = draw; Red = away team win.
For upcoming matches, an "a" indicates there is an article about the rivalry between the two participants.

== Season statistics ==
=== Top goalscorers ===
Rank	Player	Club	Goals
1	(Spain) Carlitos	Wisła Kraków	24
2	(Spain) Igor Angulo	Górnik Zabrze	23
3	(Poland) Krzysztof Piątek	Cracovia	21
4	(Denmark) Christian Gytkjær	Lech Poznań	19
4	(Poland) Marcin Robak	Śląsk Wrocław	19
6	(Portugal) Marco Paixão	Lechia Gdańsk	16
6	(Poland) Jakub Świerczok	Zagłębie Lubin	16
8	(Poland) Adam Frączczak	Pogoń Szczecin	14
9	(Poland) Jarosław Niezgoda	Legia Warsaw	13
10	(Poland) Damian Kądzior	Górnik Zabrze	10
10	(Portugal) Flávio Paixão	Lechia Gdańsk	10
10	(Poland) Arkadiusz Piech	Śląsk Wrocław	10
10	(Poland) Mateusz Szwoch	Arka Gdynia	10

=== Top assists ===
Rank	Player	Club	Assists
1	(Poland) Rafał Kurzawa	Górnik Zabrze	17
2	(Georgia (country)) Nika Kacharava	Korona Kielce	8
2	(Georgia (country)) Giorgi Merebashvili	Wisła Płock	8
4	(Spain) Carlitos	Wisła Kraków	7
4	(Lithuania) Fiodor Černych	Jagiellonia Białystok	7
4	(Poland) Dominik Furman	Wisła Płock	7
4	(Spain) Javi Hernández	Cracovia	7
4	(Switzerland) Darko Jevtić	Lech Poznań	7
4	(Bosnia and Herzegovina) Semir Štilić	Wisła Płock	7
4	(Poland) Łukasz Wolsztyński	Górnik Zabrze	7

=== Hat-tricks ===
Player	Club	Match	Result	Date	Matchday
(Spain) Igor Angulo	Górnik Zabrze	Górnik Zabrze - Wisła Kraków	3–2	29 July 2017	3.
(Spain) Igor Angulo	Górnik Zabrze	Górnik Zabrze - Wisła Płock	4–0	25 August 2017	7.
(Poland) Jakub Świerczok	Zagłębie Lubin	Zagłębie Lubin - Bruk-Bet Termalica Nieciecza	4–2	2 December 2017	18.
(Poland) Jakub Świerczok	Zagłębie Lubin	Pogoń Szczecin - Zagłębie Lubin	3–3	10 December 2017	19.
(Denmark) Christian Gytkjær	Lech Poznań	Lech Poznań - Bruk-Bet Termalica Nieciecza	3–1	17 December 2017	21.
(Finland) Kasper Hämäläinen	Legia Warsaw	Legia Warsaw - Śląsk Wrocław	4–1	16 February 2018	23.
(Spain) Carlitos	Wisła Kraków	Wisła Kraków - Śląsk Wrocław	3–1	9 March 2018	27.
(Denmark) Christian Gytkjær	Lech Poznań	Wisła Kraków - Lech Poznań	1–3	2 April 2018	29.
(Poland) Krzysztof Piątek	Cracovia	Cracovia - Bruk-Bet Termalica Nieciecza	4–2	29 April 2018	33.
(Poland) Adam Frączczak	Pogoń Szczecin	Cracovia - Pogoń Szczecin	1–4	19 May 2018	37.

== Attendances ==
Pos	Team	Total	High	Low	Average	Change
1	Lech Poznań	393,241	36,941	4,376	20,697	+5.4%
2	Górnik Zabrze	340,551	24,563	6,254	18,920	+77.9%^{1}
3	Legia Warsaw	329,354	25,980	11,388	17,334	−15.3%
4	Wisła Kraków	259,580	33,000	4,022	14,421	+3.2%
5	Jagiellonia Białystok	208,821	20,086	4,111	10,991	−18.5%
6	Lechia Gdańsk	194,228	22,871	2,235	10,790	−37.8%
7	Śląsk Wrocław	204,211	24,086	4,207	10,748	+18.3%
8	Arka Gdynia	154,589	14,113	3,074	8,136	+5.4%
9	Korona Kielce	135,364	15,200	4,812	7,520	+4.3%
10	Pogoń Szczecin	124,030	15,288	1,611	6,528	+12.4%
11	Zagłębie Lubin	110,908	12,721	1,821	6,162	−2.2%
12	Wisła Płock	95,013	10,021	899	5,001	−6.5%
13	Cracovia	92,535	14,000	450	4,870	−36.9%
14	Piast Gliwice	79,512	6,249	3,174	4,417	−12.7%
15	Nieciecza	49,989	4,561	919	2,777	−24.8%
16	Sandecja Nowy Sącz	30,557	2,983	312	1,698	+14.7%^{1}
	League total	2,802,483	36,941	312	9,468	−1.6%

Updated to games played on 20 May 2018.
Source: 90minut (in Polish)
Notes:
1: Team played last season in I liga

== Awards ==
=== Monthly awards ===
==== Player of the Month ====
Month	Player	Club
July 2017	(Spain) Igor Angulo	Górnik Zabrze
August 2017	(Spain) Igor Angulo	Górnik Zabrze
September 2017	(Poland) Marcin Robak	Śląsk Wrocław
October 2017	(Spain) Carlitos	Wisła Kraków
November 2017	(Spain) Igor Angulo	Górnik Zabrze
December 2017	(Poland) Jakub Świerczok	Zagłębie Lubin
February 2018	(Czech Republic) Martin Pospíšil	Jagiellonia Białystok
March 2018	(Denmark) Christian Gytkjær	Lech Poznań
April 2018	(Poland) Krzysztof Piątek	Cracovia
May 2018	(Poland) Adam Frączczak	Pogoń Szczecin

==== Coach of the Month ====
Month	Coach	Club
July 2017	(Poland) Marcin Brosz	Górnik Zabrze
August 2017	(Poland) Piotr Stokowiec	Zagłębie Lubin
September 2017	(Poland) Jerzy Brzęczek	Wisła Płock
October 2017	(Germany) Gino Lettieri	Korona Kielce
November 2017	(Germany) Gino Lettieri	Korona Kielce
December 2017	(Poland) Jerzy Brzęczek	Wisła Płock
February 2018	(Poland) Ireneusz Mamrot	Jagiellonia Białystok
March 2018	(Croatia) Nenad Bjelica	Lech Poznań
April 2018	(Poland) Jerzy Brzęczek	Wisła Płock
May 2018	(Croatia) Dean Klafurić	Legia Warsaw

=== Annual awards ===
Award	Player	Club
Player of the Season	(Spain) Carlitos	Wisła Kraków
Goalkeeper of the Season	(Poland) Arkadiusz Malarz	Legia Warsaw
Defender of the Season	(Poland) Michał Helik	Cracovia
Midfielder of the Season	(Poland) Rafał Kurzawa	Górnik Zabrze
Forward of the Season	(Spain) Carlitos	Wisła Kraków
Coach of the Season	(Poland) Marcin Brosz	Górnik Zabrze
Top Scorer of the season	(Spain) Carlitos	Wisła Kraków
Discovery of the season	(Poland) Szymon Żurkowski	Górnik Zabrze
Turbokozak	(Poland) Sebastian Mila	Lechia Gdańsk

Team of the Season
Goalkeeper	(Poland) Tomasz Loska (Górnik Zabrze)			
Defenders	(Poland) Robert Gumny (Lech Poznań)	(Poland) Michał Helik (Cracovia)	(Poland) Rafał Janicki (Wisła Kraków)	(Poland) Rafał Kurzawa (Górnik Zabrze)
Midfielders	(Poland) Szymon Żurkowski (Górnik Zabrze)	(Poland) Taras Romanczuk (Jagiellonia Białystok)		(Poland) Jacek Góralski (Jagiellonia Białystok)
Forwards	(Spain) Carlitos (Wisła Kraków)	(Spain) Igor Angulo (Górnik Zabrze)		(Poland) Krzysztof Piątek (Cracovia)

== See also ==
- 2017–18 I liga
- 2017–18 Polish Cup
