= Adam Marciniak =

Polish footballer (born 1988)

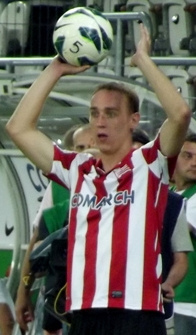
- Marciniak with Cracovia in 2012

Personal information
- Full name: Adam Marciniak
- Date of birth: 28 September 1988 (age 38)
- Place of birth: Łódź, Poland
- Height: 1.86 m (6 ft 1 in)
- Position: Defender

Team information
- Current team: ŁKS Łódź (academy director)

Senior career*
Years	Team	Apps	(Gls)
2006–2007	ŁKS Łódź	14	(1)
2007–2012	Górnik Zabrze	60	(2)
2008	→ Śląsk Wrocław (loan)	8	(0)
2008	→ ŁKS Łódź (loan)	15	(0)
2012–2015	Cracovia	100	(3)
2015–2016	AEK Larnaca	24	(2)
2016–2020	Arka Gdynia	141	(5)
2021–2024	ŁKS Łódź	64	(0)
2022–2024	ŁKS Łódź II	10	(0)
Total		436	(13)

International career
2009–2010	Poland U21	8	(0)
2013	Poland	2	(0)
- * Club domestic league appearances and goals

Adam Marciniak (born 28 September 1988) is a Polish football executive, pundit, co-commentator and former professional player who played as a defender. He currently serves as ŁKS Łódź's academy director.

He retired at the end of the 2023–24 season. Shortly after, he joined TVP Sport as a pundit to cover I liga.

== Career ==
=== ŁKS Łódź ===
He started his career in ŁKS Łódź, where he debuted on 10 June 2006 in a 1–0 away victory over Piast Gliwice. In the 34th minute of a Polish Cup 2–0 away loss with Legia Warsaw, which took place on 24 February 2007, he was given with a red card. He scored the first goal for ŁKS less than two months later, on 13 April 2007, in the 83th minute of a 1–1 away draw against Zagłębie Lubin.

== Career statistics ==
=== International ===
Appearances and goals by national team and year
National team	Year	Apps	Goals
Poland
Poland	2013	2	0
Total		2	0

== Honours ==
Arka Gdynia

- Polish Cup: 2016–17
- Polish Super Cup: 2017, 2018

ŁKS Łódź

- I liga: 2022–23

ŁKS Łódź II

- III liga, group I: 2022–23
