= Michał Żebrakowski =

Polish association football player

Personal information
- Full name: Michał Żebrakowski
- Date of birth: 7 January 1997 (age 29)
- Place of birth: Rzeszów, Poland
- Height: 1.93 m (6 ft 4 in)
- Position: Forward

Team information
- Current team: KS Zaczernie

Youth career
- –2014: Stal Rzeszów

Senior career*
Years	Team	Apps	(Gls)
2014–2015	Stal Rzeszów	12	(0)
2015–2016	Lechia Gdańsk	3	(0)
2016–2017	Siarka Tarnobrzeg	29	(9)
2017–2019	Arka Gdynia	2	(0)
2018	→ Górnik Łęczna (loan)	1	(0)
2019	→ Warta Poznań (loan)	12	(2)
2019–2022	Wigry Suwałki	52	(11)
2022–2024	Motor Lublin	20	(2)
2024–2025	Pogoń-Sokół Lubaczów	4	(0)
2025–2026	Głogovia Głogów Małopolski	6	(5)
2026–	KS Zaczernie	0	(0)

International career
2017	Poland U20	3	(1)
- * Club domestic league appearances and goals as of 19:10, 27 February 2026 (UTC)

Michał Żebrakowski (born 7 January 1997) is a Polish professional footballer who plays as a forward for regional league club KS Zaczernie.

== Senior career ==
Żebrakowski started his career with the team in the town of his birth, Stal in Rzeszów. After coming up through their youth system, he made his debut for Stal in 2014. After his first professional season he joined Lechia Gdańsk in the summer of 2015. His time at Lechia was unsuccessful, and he only managed 3 appearances for the first team. At the end of the season he made the move to Siarka Tarnobrzeg. Żebrakowski's time with Siarka was more successful, and he played most of the games that season, scoring 9 goals for the club. The next season, Żebrakowski found himself playing in the top division once again, this time for Lechia's main rivals, Arka Gdynia. In his first competitive appearance for Arka he helped the team to win the Polish Super Cup for the first time in their history. Żebrakowski failed to make a claim for a starting place in the Arka first team, and moved on loan to Górnik Łęczna for six months. This move also turned out to be unsuccessful, and he managed only one game for Górnik during the loan spell.

== Honours ==
Stal Rzeszów

- III liga Lublin–Subcarpathia: 2014–15

Arka Gdynia

- Polish Super Cup: 2017
