= 2017 Polish Super Cup =

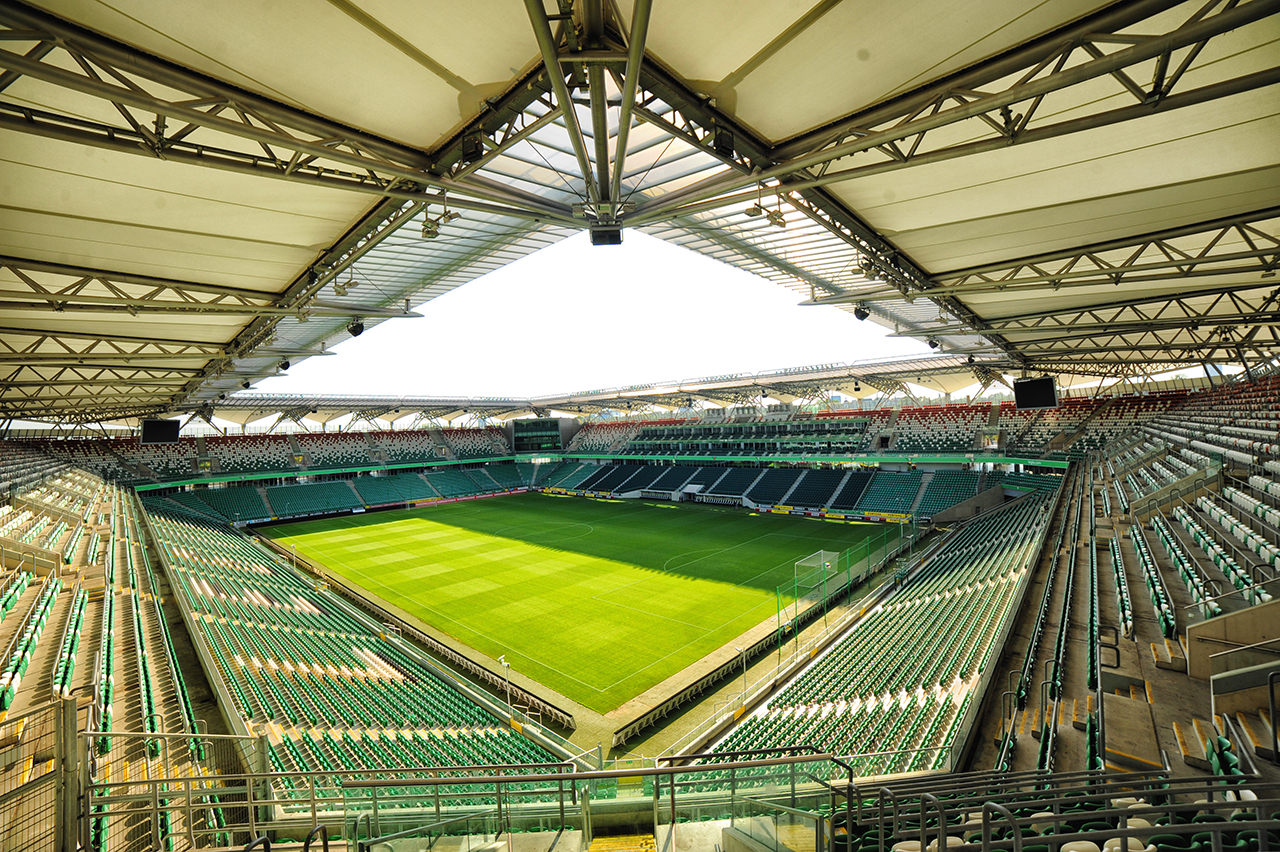
- The Polish Army Stadium in Warsaw hosted the final.
Legia Warsaw	Arka Gdynia
1	1
- Arka Gdynia won 4–3 on penalties
- Date: 7 July 2017
- Venue: Stadion Wojska Polskiego, Warsaw
- Referee: Szymon Marciniak (Płock)
- Attendance: 26,756

The 2017 Polish Super Cup was held on 7 July 2017 between the 2016–17 Ekstraklasa winners Legia Warsaw and the 2016–17 Polish Cup winners Arka Gdynia.

== Match details ==
7 July 2017
20:30 CEST (UTC+02:00)

Legia Warsaw	1–1	Arka Gdynia
Moulin 27'	Report	Pazdan 20' (o.g.)
Penalties
Szwoch (penalty scored); Moulin (penalty missed); Guilherme (penalty scored); Dąbrowski (penalty scored); Kopczyński (penalty missed)	3–4	(penalty scored) Warcholak; (penalty scored) Sołdecki; (penalty scored) Zbozień; (penalty scored) Jurado

Stadion Wojska Polskiego, Warsaw
Attendance: 26,756
Referee: Szymon Marciniak (Płock)

Legia Warsaw	Arka Gdynia

GK	1	(Poland) Arkadiusz Malarz
RB	55	(Poland) Artur Jędrzejczyk	(yellow card) 90'	(substituted off) 90+2'
CB	5	(Poland) Maciej Dąbrowski
CB	2	(Poland) Michał Pazdan	(yellow card) 49'
LB	14	(Czech Republic) Adam Hloušek
CM	15	(Poland) Michał Kopczyński (c)
CM	75	(France) Thibault Moulin
RM	6	(Brazil) Guilherme
AM	22	(Finland) Kasper Hämäläinen		(substituted off) 67'
LM	21	(Hungary) Dominik Nagy		(substituted off) 64'
CF	11	(Poland) Jarosław Niezgoda		(substituted off) 57'
Substitutes:
GK	29	(Poland) Jakub Szumski
FW	9	(France) Vamara Sanogo		(substituted in) 67'
MF	17	(Poland) Konrad Michalak
DF	19	(Poland) Rafał Makowski
MF	20	(Poland) Mateusz Szwoch	(yellow card) 82'	(substituted in) 57'
DF	23	(Poland) Mateusz Żyro		(substituted in) 90+2'
MF	53	(Poland) Sebastian Szymański		(substituted in) 64'
Manager:
(Poland) Jacek Magiera

GK	1	(Latvia) Pāvels Šteinbors
RB	33	(Poland) Damian Zbozień
CB	29	(Poland) Michał Marcjanik
CB	3	(Poland) Krzysztof Sobieraj (c)	(yellow card) 90+5'
LB	23	(Poland) Marcin Warcholak
CM	17	(Poland) Adam Marciniak		(substituted off) 77'
CM	21	(Germany) Yannick Kakoko
RM	8	(Brazil) Marcus da Silva		(substituted off) 62'
AM	13	(Poland) Grzegorz Piesio		(substituted off) 84'
LM	24	(Poland) Patryk Kun		(substituted off) 90+4'
CF	11	(Poland) Rafał Siemaszko		(substituted off) 67'
Substitutes:
GK	80	(Poland) Krzysztof Pilarz
DF	2	(Poland) Tadeusz Socha		(substituted in) 84'
DF	4	(Poland) Dawid Sołdecki		(substituted in) 62'
FW	9	(Spain) Rubén Jurado		(substituted in) 67'
DF	14	(Poland) Michał Nalepa		(substituted in) 77'
MF	25	(Poland) Paweł Wojowski
FW	44	(Poland) Michał Żebrakowski		(substituted in) 90+4'
Manager:
(Poland) Leszek Ojrzyński

Match rules

- 90 minutes.
- Penalty shoot-out if scores still level.
- Seven named substitutes.
- Maximum of five substitutions.

== See also ==
- 2017–18 Ekstraklasa
- 2017–18 Polish Cup
