= Tadeusz Socha =

Polish footballer

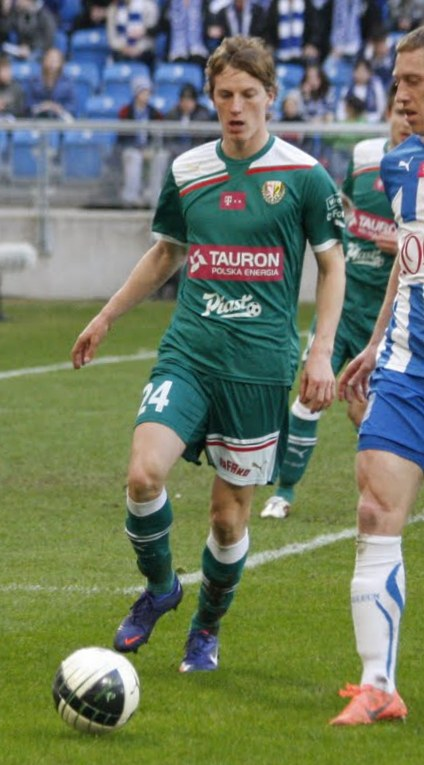
- Socha with Śląsk Wrocław in 2012

Personal information
- Full name: Tadeusz Socha
- Date of birth: 15 February 1988 (age 38)
- Place of birth: Wrocław, Poland
- Height: 1.83 m (6 ft 0 in)
- Position: Right-back

Team information
- Current team: Stal Rzeszów (head scout)

Youth career
- 2005–2007: Śląsk Wrocław

Senior career*
Years	Team	Apps	(Gls)
2007–2014	Śląsk Wrocław	126	(0)
2015	Bytovia Bytów	10	(0)
2015–2019	Arka Gdynia	59	(2)
2019–2020	Sandecja Nowy Sącz	6	(0)
Total		201	(2)

International career
2009–2010	Poland U21	5	(0)
- * Club domestic league appearances and goals

Tadeusz Socha (born 15 February 1988) is a Polish former professional footballer who played as a right-back. He is currently the head scout of I liga club Stal Rzeszów.

== Honours ==
Śląsk Wrocław

- Ekstraklasa: 2011–12
- Ekstraklasa Cup: 2008–09
- Polish Super Cup: 2012

Arka Gdynia

- I liga: 2015–16
- Polish Cup: 2016–17
- Polish Super Cup: 2017, 2018
