= Krzysztof Sobieraj =

Polish footballer and manager

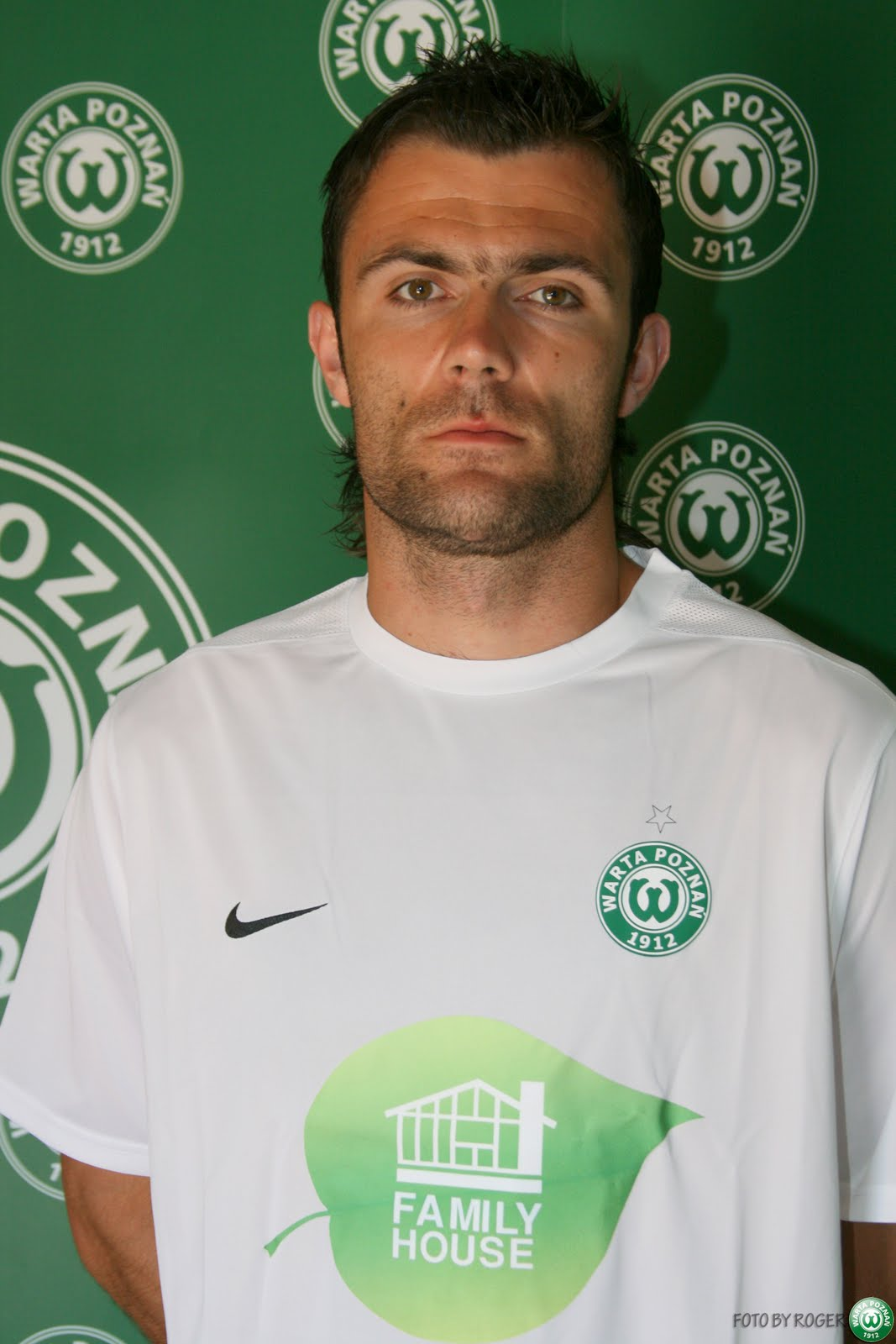
- Sobieraj with Warta Poznań in 2011

Personal information
- Date of birth: 25 August 1981 (age 45)
- Place of birth: Kielce, Poland
- Height: 1.89 m (6 ft 2 in)
- Position: Centre-back

Senior career*
Years	Team	Apps	(Gls)
- Korona Kielce
- Błękitni Kielce
- Spartakus Daleszyce
- Piast Chęciny
- KSZO 1929
2001	Star Starachowice		
2001	Heko Czermno		
2002	Nida Pińczów		
2002	MKS Końskie		
2003	AKS Busko Zdrój		
2004	Tłoki Gorzyce	12	(0)
2004–2009	Arka Gdynia	117	(1)
2009	Lubrzanka Kajetanów	10	(1)
2010–2011	Olimpia Elbląg	40	(3)
2011–2012	Warta Poznań	22	(1)
2012–2018	Arka Gdynia	130	(0)
2018–2019	Ogniwo Sopot	8	(0)

Managerial career
- 2009: Lubrzanka Kajetanów (player-manager)
- 2018–2019: Ogniwo Sopot (player-manager)
- 2020: Arka Gdynia
- 2020–2021: KP Starogard Gdański
- 2025: KP Starogard Gdański
- 2026: Cartusia Kartuzy
- * Club domestic league appearances and goals

Krzysztof Sobieraj (born 25 August 1981) is a Polish professional football manager and former player who played as a centre-back. He was most recently in charge of IV liga Pomerania club Cartusia Kartuzy.

== Coaching career ==
Sobieraj started his coaching career at the age of 28. He terminated his contract with Arka Gdynia to become a player-manager at LZS Lubrzanka Kajetanów. Sobieraj signed a contract until the end of 2009. In 10 league games in charge, the team recorded two victories and two draws. Sobieraj played in all matches, playing the full 90 minutes and scoring once. In 2010, he continued as a player, signing with Olimpia Elbląg.

In August 2018, Sobieraj joined Ogniwo Sopot, once again as a player-manager. Sobieraj was invited by his former teammate from Arka Gdynia, Tomasz Mazurkiewicz, who at the time worked for the club. On 4 April 2019, Sobieraj left his position to become assistant manager of Wisła Płock under his former manager from Arka Gdynia, Leszek Ojrzyński.

From 2018 to 2019, Sobieraj also worked as a youth coach at Gdyńska AP Dąbrowa and KP Frajda Gdynia.

On 11 October 2019, Sobieraj was appointed assistant manager of his former club Arka Gdynia under manager Aleksandar Rogić. Rogić was fired on 10 March 2020 and Sobieraj took charge of the team for the rest of the season. Three days after his appointment, Ekstraklasa was suspended due to the outbreak of COVID-19 pandemic, and he was replaced on 10 May 2020 by Ireneusz Mamrot without managing Arka in an official match.

== Managerial statistics ==
As of match played 30 May 2026

Managerial record by team and tenure
Team	From	To	Record							
Team	From	To	G	W	D	L	GF	GA	GD	Win %
Lubrzanka Kajetanów	10 September 2009	17 December 2009	11	2	2	7	11	28	−17	18.18
Ogniwo Sopot	4 August 2018	25 March 2019	18	12	2	4	42	23	+19	66.67
Arka Gdynia	10 March 2020	10 May 2020	0	0	0	0	0	0	—	
KP Starogard Gdański	17 September 2020	21 March 2021	16	9	2	5	21	18	+3	56.25
KP Starogard Gdański	6 January 2025	21 September 2025	26	16	6	4	59	31	+28	61.54
Cartusia Kartuzy	13 January 2026	4 July 2026	20	4	4	12	19	30	−11	20.00
Career total			91	43	16	32	152	130	+22	47.25

== Honours ==
Arka Gdynia

- Polish Cup: 2016–17
- Polish Super Cup: 2017
