= Rafał Siemaszko =

Polish footballer

Member of the Sejm
- Incumbent
- Assumed office 12 November 2023
- Constituency: Słupsk

Personal details
- Born: Rafał Siemaszko; 11 September 1986 (age 40) Wejherowo, Gdańsk Voivodeship, Polish People's Republic
- Party: Civic Platform
- Occupation: Politician; footballer
Association football career
- Height: 1.70 m (5 ft 7 in)
- Position: Forward
Team information
- Current team: Salos Rumia
- Number: 11
Senior career*
Years	Team	Apps	(Gls)
2004–2012	Orkan Rumia		
2010–2011	→ Arka Gdynia (loan)	12	(0)
2012–2014	Gryf Wejherowo	64	(24)
2014–2015	Chojniczanka Chojnice	31	(6)
2015–2020	Arka Gdynia	122	(25)
2020–2021	Sokół Ostróda	30	(4)
2021–2023	Wikęd Luzino	40	(23)
2023–2024	Wierzyca Pelplin	41	(23)
2025–	Salos Rumia	10	(8)
Managerial career
- 2023–2024: Wierzyca Pelplin (player-manager)
- * Club domestic league appearances and goals as of 09:47, 21 February 2026 (UTC)

Rafał Siemaszko (born 11 September 1986) is a Polish politician and professional footballer who plays for regional league club Salos Rumia.

== Football career ==
In the summer of 2010, he was loaned to Arka Gdynia on a one-year deal. He returned to Orkan one year later. He played in Gryf Wejherowo from 2012 to 2014, before spending the next season in Chojniczanka Chojnice. In 2015, he returned to Arka Gdynia. He also represented Sokół Ostróda. In 2025, after a year-long break from football, he joined regional league side Salos Rumia.

=== Honours ===
Arka Gdynia

- I liga: 2015–16
- Polish Cup: 2016–17
- Polish Super Cup: 2017, 2018

Wierzyca Pelplin

- Regional league Gdańsk II: 2023–24

== Political career ==
In the 2023 Polish parliamentary election, he was elected to the Sejm from Civic Platform in Słupsk. He assumed the position of Secretary of the Sejm and became a member of the Committee on Physical Culture, Sports, and Tourism.
