= Marcin Warcholak =

Polish footballer

Personal information
- Date of birth: 8 August 1989 (age 37)
- Place of birth: Wschowa, Leszno Voivodeship, Poland
- Height: 1.82 m (6 ft 0 in)
- Position: Left-back

Senior career*
Years	Team	Apps	(Gls)
2008–2009	Polonia Słubice	25	(0)
2010	Celuloza Kostrzyn nad Odrą	9	(0)
2010–2012	Ilanka Rzepin	50	(16)
2012–2013	Gryf Wejherowo	48	(6)
2013–2014	Stomil Olsztyn	13	(2)
2014–2018	Arka Gdynia	108	(6)
2018–2019	Wisła Płock	13	(0)
2019–2020	Miedź Legnica	8	(1)
2020–2021	KP Starogard Gdański	26	(4)
2021–2023	Olimpia Grudziądz	80	(7)
2024	Tłuchowia Tłuchowo	31	(15)
2025–2026	KP Starogard Gdański	46	(4)
- * Club domestic league appearances and goals as of 16:12, 9 July 2026 (UTC)

Marcin Warcholak (born 8 August 1989) is a Polish professional footballer who plays as a left-back.

== Honours ==
Arka Gdynia

- I liga: 2015–16
- Polish Cup: 2016–17
- Polish Super Cup: 2017

Olimpia Grudziądz

- III liga, group II: 2022–23
