= Grzegorz Piesio =

Polish footballer

Personal information
- Full name: Grzegorz Piesio
- Date of birth: 17 July 1988 (age 38)
- Place of birth: Garwolin, Poland
- Height: 1.85 m (6 ft 1 in)
- Position: Midfielder

Team information
- Current team: Wilga Garwolin
- Number: 13

Youth career
- Wilga Garwolin
- Amica Wronki

Senior career*
Years	Team	Apps	(Gls)
2006	Amica Wronki		
2006–2009	Lech Poznań (ME)		
2008	→ Górnik Łęczna (loan)	16	(1)
2008–2009	→ Stomil Olsztyn (loan)	29	(9)
2009–2010	Znicz Pruszków	22	(0)
2010–2015	Dolcan Ząbki	151	(33)
2015–2017	Górnik Łęczna	63	(8)
2017–2018	Arka Gdynia	40	(2)
2018–2019	GKS Katowice	22	(0)
2019–2020	Kotwica Kołobrzeg	16	(3)
2020	Wilga Garwolin	11	(2)
2021	KP Starogard Gdański	16	(0)
2021–	Wilga Garwolin	128	(34)
- * Club domestic league appearances and goals as of 08:12, 23 June 2025 (UTC)

Grzegorz Piesio (born 17 July 1988) is a Polish professional footballer who plays as a midfielder for IV liga Masovia club Wilga Garwolin.

== Career ==
In the beginning of August 2019, Piesio joined Kotwica Kołobrzeg.

== Honours ==
Górnik Łęczna

- III liga, group IV: 2007–08

Arka Gdynia

- Polish Super Cup: 2017
