= Bartłomiej Sielewski =

Polish footballer

Personal information
- Full name: Bartłomiej Sielewski
- Date of birth: 9 August 1984 (age 42)
- Place of birth: Płock, Poland
- Height: 1.87 m (6 ft 1 1/2 in)
- Position: Centre-back

Youth career
- Wisła Płock

Senior career*
Years	Team	Apps	(Gls)
2003–2004	Masovia Płock		
2005–2007	Mazowsze Płock		
2007–2010	Wisła Płock	79	(10)
2010–2011	Piast Gliwice	18	(2)
2011–2021	Wisła Płock	157	(11)
- * Club domestic league appearances and goals

Bartłomiej Sielewski (born 9 August 1984) is a Polish former professional footballer who played as a centre-back.

== Career ==
=== Club ===
From 2003 to 2007, he played for two Płock lower division sides, Masovia and Mazowsze. In 2007, he moved to Wisła Płock. He made his debut as a substitute in a 1–2 away win over Motor Lublin on 8 August 2007. During his first stint with Wisła, he made 84 appearances across all competitions, scored 10 goals and was given 13 yellow cards.

In June 2011, he returned to Wisła Płock on a two-year contract.

== Honours ==
Wisła Płock

- II liga East: 2012–13
