= Romeo Jozak =

Croatian football manager (born 1972)

Personal information
- Date of birth: 11 October 1972 (age 54)
- Place of birth: Rijeka, SR Croatia, SFR Yugoslavia

Team information
- Current team: Saudi Arabia (technical director)

Senior career*
Years	Team	Apps	(Gls)
–1994	Orijent		

Managerial career
- 2001–2002: Dinamo Zagreb (assistant)
- 2003–2004: Libya (assistant)
- 2004–2005: Dinamo Zagreb (assistant)
- 2005–2006: Libya (assistant)
- 2006–2008: Osijek (assistant)
- 2008–2013: Dinamo Zagreb Academy
- 2013–2017: Croatia (technical director)
- 2017: Dinamo Zagreb (sporting director)
- 2017–2018: Legia Warsaw
- 2018–2019: Kuwait U23
- 2018–2019: Kuwait
- 2021–: Saudi Arabia (technical director)
- * Club domestic league appearances and goals

Romeo Jozak (born 11 October 1972) is a Croatian professional football manager and former player who most recently managed the Kuwait national team.

== Early career ==
Jozak grew up in a family of mathematics and physics teachers. He ended his football career early due to a serious injury at the age of twenty-two while playing at the club NK Orijent Rijeka. During the Croatian War of Independence, he stayed in Zagreb. Soon after he was awarded a scholarship to the United States, where he also worked as an instructor at youth summer camps. After returning, he started training with Ilija Lončarević, assisting him as an assistant at Dinamo Zagreb (2001–2002 and 2004–2005), the Libya team (2003–2004 and 2005–2006) and NK Osijek (2006–2008). At the same time, he completed his doctorate education at the Faculty of Kinesiology at the University of Zagreb.

== Managerial career ==
=== Early career ===
He parted ways with the Croatian Football Federation in March 2017. Then returning to Dinamo Zagreb as a sports director, but he only staying there for four months. After the dismissal of Dinamo Zagreb's head coach, Ivaylo Petev, Jozak hinted at taking over for the vacant head coach position. The board replaced Petev with Mario Cvitanović and Jozak soon after decided to resign.

=== Legia Warsaw ===
On 13 September 2017, Jozak was hired as the manager of Polish club Legia Warsaw. On 14 April 2018, after his team lost 0–1 to Zagłębie Lubin, he was fired and replaced by his assistant Dean Klafurić.

=== Kuwait national team ===
On 27 July 2018, Jozak was hired as the head coach of the Kuwait national team. On 12 September 2019, Jozak was fired following a home defeat to Australia.

=== Columbus Blast FC Soccer Academy ===
Jozak made a significant investment and became the majority owner of Columbus’ Blast FC Soccer Academy in Columbus, Ohio, which is the longest running youth soccer program in Central Ohio.

=== Saudi Arabia ===
On 22 July 2021, Jozak was hired as the technical director of the Saudi Arabia national team.

== Managerial statistics ==
As of match played on 30 June 2021

Team	Nat	From	To	Record				
Team	Nat	From	To	G	W	D	L	Win %
Legia Warsaw	(Poland)	13 September 2017	14 April 2018	27	16	3	8	59.26
Kuwait	(Kuwait)	27 July 2018	11 September 2019	5	2	1	2	40.00
Total				32	18	4	10	56.25
