= Dawid Sołdecki =

Polish footballer

Personal information
- Full name: Dawid Sołdecki
- Date of birth: 29 April 1987 (age 39)
- Place of birth: Krasnystaw, Poland
- Height: 1.85 m (6 ft 1 in)
- Position: Defender

Team information
- Current team: Start Krasnystaw
- Number: 24

Senior career*
Years	Team	Apps	(Gls)
2004	Jedynka Krasnystaw		
2004–2013	Górnik Łęczna	108	(4)
2007	→ Jagiellonia Białystok (loan)	1	(0)
2013–2016	Termalica Bruk-Bet	89	(9)
2016–2019	Arka Gdynia	53	(2)
2019–2020	Wigry Suwałki	18	(0)
2020–	Start Krasnystaw	94	(38)
- * Club domestic league appearances and goals as of 14:40, 27 June 2025 (UTC)

Dawid Sołdecki (born 29 April 1987) is a Polish footballer who plays as a defender for IV liga Lublin club Start Krasnystaw.

== Early life ==
Sołdecki was born on 29 April 1987 in Krasnystaw, where he grew up with his parents and a niece named Aleksandra (diminutive Ola). In 2004, he was signed by Jedynka Krasnystaw at the age of 17 years old.

== Honours ==
Górnik Łęczna

- III liga, group IV: 2007–08

Arka Gdynia

- Polish Cup: 2016–17
- Polish Super Cup: 2017, 2018

Start Krasnystaw

- Polish Cup (Lublin regionals): 2022–23
- Polish Cup (Chełm regionals): 2022–23, 2023–24, 2024–25
