= Dominik Nagy =

Hungarian footballer (born 1995)

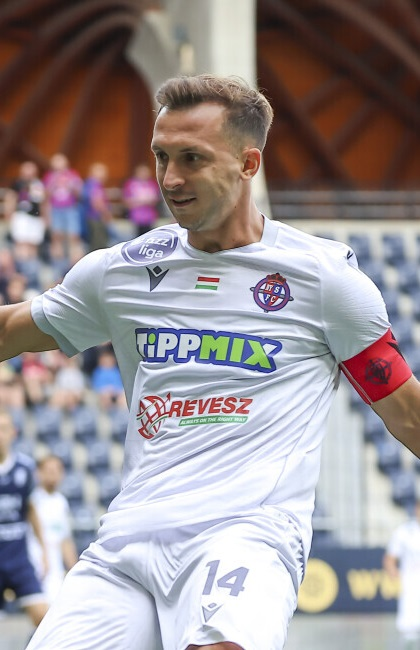
- Nagy playing for Nyíregyháza in 2025

Personal information
- Full name: Dominik Nagy
- Date of birth: 8 May 1995 (age 31)
- Place of birth: Bóly, Hungary
- Height: 1.74 m (5 ft 9 in)
- Position: Winger

Team information
- Current team: Nyíregyháza
- Number: 14

Youth career
- 2003–2004: Bóly
- 2004–2012: Pécs

Senior career*
Years	Team	Apps	(Gls)
2012–2013	Pécs	3	(0)
2013	→ Kozármisleny (loan)	13	(1)
2013–2016	Ferencváros	43	(2)
2017–2020	Legia Warsaw	60	(11)
2017–2020	→ Legia Warsaw II	8	(0)
2018	→ Ferencváros (loan)	13	(0)
2020	→ Panathinaikos (loan)	9	(1)
2021–2023	Budapest Honvéd	39	(9)
2023	Mezőkövesd	5	(0)
2023–	Nyíregyháza	71	(14)

International career
2011–2012	Hungary U17		
2013–2014	Hungary U19		
2014–2015	Hungary U20		
2016	Hungary U21	2	(1)
2016–2019	Hungary	10	(1)
- * Club domestic league appearances and goals as of 30 May 2026

Dominik Nagy (born 8 May 1995) is a Hungarian professional footballer who plays as a winger for and captains Nemzeti Bajnokság I club Nyíregyháza. He was also part of the Hungarian U19 team at the 2014 UEFA European Under-19 Championship and the U20 team at the 2015 FIFA U-20 World Cup.

== Club career ==
=== Ferencváros ===
On 2 April 2016, Nagy became a Hungarian League champion with Ferencvárosi TC after losing to Debreceni VSC 2–1 at the Nagyerdei Stadion in the 2015–16 Nemzeti Bajnokság I season.

=== Legia Warsaw ===
On 22 April 2017, Nagy scored his first goal in the 2016–17 Ekstraklasa season against Cracovia in the 18th minute at the Marshal Józef Piłsudski Stadium, Kraków, Poland.

=== Panathinaikos (loan) ===
On 14 January 2020, Panathinaikos officially announced the signing of Nagy on a six-month loan.

=== Legia Warsaw II ===
After returning from loan in Panathinaikos, Dominik Nagy was moved to Legia's reserve team. The coaching staff stated that they did not see a place for him in the first team. Eventually, he did not appear in any of the 2020–21 season games.

=== Budapest Honvéd ===
On 19 January 2021, he joined the Hungarian club Budapest Honvéd.

=== Mezőkövesd ===
On 17 January 2023, Nagy signed with Mezőkövesd.

=== Nyíregyháza ===
On 21 July 2023, he joined Nemzeti Bajnokság II side Nyíregyháza.

== International career ==
Nagy was part of the Hungarian U-20 team at the 2015 FIFA U-20 World Cup, playing in four games. He made his debut for U-21 team against Finland U21 on 13 November 2014. In November 2016 Nagy received his first call-up to the senior Hungary squad for matches against Andorra and Sweden, and he made his debut against second one.

== Career statistics ==
=== Club ===
As of 8 May 2024

Appearances and goals by club, season and competition
Club	Season	League			National cup (Note: Includes Magyar Kupa, Polish Cup, Greek Cup)		Continental		Other		Total	
Club	Season	Division	Apps	Goals	Apps	Goals	Apps	Goals	Apps	Goals	Apps	Goals
Pécs	2011–12	NB I	2	0	—		—		—		2	0
Pécs	2012–13	NB I	1	0	0	0	—		—		1	0
Pécs	Total		3	0	0	0	—		—		3	0
Kozármisleny (loan)	2012–13	NB II West	13	1	—		—		—		13	1
Ferencváros	2013–14	NB I	0	0	0	0	—		—		0	0
Ferencváros	2014–15	NB I	10	1	3	2	—		—		13	3
Ferencváros	2015–16	NB I	15	0	5	2	1 (Note: Appearance(s) in UEFA Europa League)	0	—		21	2
Ferencváros	2016–17	NB I	18	1	1	0	2 (Note: Appearances in UEFA Champions League)	0	—		21	1
Ferencváros	Total		43	2	9	4	3	0	—		55	6
Legia Warsaw	2016–17	Ekstraklasa	12	4	—		0	0	—		12	4
Legia Warsaw	2017–18	Ekstraklasa	9	1	2	1	5 (Note: Three appearances and one goal in UEFA Champions League, two appearances in UEFA Europa League)	1	1 (Note: Appearance in Polish Super Cup)	0	17	3
Legia Warsaw	2018–19	Ekstraklasa	30	5	3	0	4 (Note: Two appearances in UEFA Champions League, two appearances in UEFA Europa League)	0	1	0	38	5
Legia Warsaw	2019–20	Ekstraklasa	9	1	1	0	7	0	—		17	1
Legia Warsaw	Total		60	11	6	1	16	1	2	0	84	13
Legia Warsaw II	2016–17	III liga, gr. I	1	0	—		—		—		1	0
Legia Warsaw II	2017–18	III liga, gr. I	5	0	—		—		—		5	0
Legia Warsaw II	2019–20	III liga, gr. I	2	0	0	0	—		—		2	0
Legia Warsaw II	2020–21	III liga, gr. I	0	0	—		—		—		0	0
Legia Warsaw II	Total		8	0	0	0	—		—		8	0
Ferencváros (loan)	2017–18	NB I	13	0	—		—		—		13	0
Panathinaikos (loan)	2019–20	Super League Greece	9	1	2	0	—		—		11	1
Budapest Honvéd	2020–21	NB I	16	2	1	0	—		—		17	2
Budapest Honvéd	2021–22	NB I	23	7	4	0	—		—		27	7
Budapest Honvéd	2022–23	NB I	0	0	0	0	—		—		0	0
Budapest Honvéd	Total		39	9	5	0	0	0	20	0	44	9
Mezőkövesd	2022–23	NB I	5	0	0	0	—		—		5	0
Nyíregyháza	2023–24	NB II	29	10	2	0	—		—		31	10
Career total			222	34	24	5	19	1	2	0	267	40

=== International ===
Appearances and goals by national team and year
National team	Year	Apps	Goals
Hungary
Hungary	2016	1	0
Hungary	2017	1	0
Hungary	2018	3	1
Hungary	2019	5	0
Total		10	1

Scores and results list Hungary's goal tally first, score column indicates score after each Nagy goal.

List of international goals scored by Dominik Nagy
No.	Date	Venue	Opponent	Score	Result	Competition
1	15 October 2018	A. Le Coq Arena, Tallinn, Estonia	Estonia	1–1	3–3	2018–19 UEFA Nations League C

== Honours ==
Ferencváros

- Nemzeti Bajnokság I: 2015–16
- Magyar Kupa: 2014–15, 2015–16, 2016–17
- Szuperkupa: 2015
- Ligakupa: 2014–15

Legia Warsaw

- Ekstraklasa: 2016–17, 2017–18, 2019–20
- Polish Cup: 2016–17
