= Damian Zbozień =

Polish footballer

Personal information
- Date of birth: 25 April 1989 (age 37)
- Place of birth: Limanowa, Poland
- Height: 1.86 m (6 ft 1 in)
- Position: Right-back

Team information
- Current team: Avia Świdnik
- Number: 25

Youth career
- Zyndram Łącko
- 2005–2007: Sandecja Nowy Sącz

Senior career*
Years	Team	Apps	(Gls)
2007–2013	Legia Warsaw (ME)	71	(7)
2010–2011	→ Sandecja Nowy Sącz (loan)	30	(4)
2011–2012	→ GKS Bełchatów (loan)	14	(1)
2012–2013	→ Piast Gliwice (loan)	27	(2)
2013–2014	Piast Gliwice	18	(2)
2014–2015	Amkar Perm	6	(0)
2015	→ GKS Bełchatów (loan)	13	(1)
2015–2016	Zagłębie Lubin	15	(1)
2016–2020	Arka Gdynia	120	(8)
2020–2022	Wisła Płock	31	(0)
2022–2025	Górnik Łęczna	63	(1)
2025–	Avia Świdnik	31	(2)

International career
2009–2010	Poland U21	1	(0)
- * Club domestic league appearances and goals as of 22:27, 31 May 2026 (UTC)

Damian Zbozień (born 25 April 1989) is a Polish professional footballer who plays as a right-back for II liga club Avia Świdnik. Besides Poland, he has played in Russia.

== Club career ==
Born in Limanowa, Zbozień began his career as a youth player for Zyndram Łącko. Then. he played for Sandecja Nowy Sącz youth teams for two years.

In 2007. Zbozień joined Legia Warsaw. On 30 July 2007, he made his Młoda Ekstraklasa debut in a 3–1 loss to Cracovia. Three months later, on 4 December 2007, he made his debut for Legia's first team in a 2–0 victory over ŁKS Łódź in Ekstraklasa Cup. On 7 April 2008, Zbozień scored his first goal in a 2–1 victory over GKS Bełchatów in Młoda Ekstraklasa. He ended the 2007–08 season with 27 appearances in that competition and one in Ekstraklasa Cup.

On 27 August 2008, Zbozień played for Legia's reserves in a 0–3 loss to Motor Lublin, and he ended the 2008–09 season with 28 appearances and four goals in Młoda Ekstraklasa. He also appeared in one match in Ekstraklasa Cup.

In March 2010, he moved to Sandecja Nowy Sącz.

In February 2014, Zbozień joined the Russian side Amkar Perm, where he met his fellow countryman Janusz Gol. However, Zbozień only played six league games before being loaned to GKS Bełchatów.

Quickly returning to the Ekstraklasa with Zagłębie Lubin in 2015 and Arka Gdynia, Zbozień won the Polish Cup with Arka in 2017, remaining on the bench as Arka beat Lech Poznań 2–1 at the National Stadium.

When Arka were relegated in 2020 during a season interrupted by the COVID-19 pandemic in Poland, Zbozień joined one of the clubs that finished just above the relegation zone, Wisła Płock.

On 5 August 2022, Zbozień left Wisła to join I liga side Górnik Łęczna on a two-year contract.

On 12 June 2025, Zbozień joined III liga club Avia Świdnik.

== Honours ==
Arka Gdynia

- Polish Cup: 2016–17
- Polish Super Cup: 2017, 2018

Avia Świdnik

- III liga, group IV: 2025–26
- Polish Cup (Lublin regionals): 2025–26
