= Leszek Ojrzyński =

Polish footballer and manager (born 1972)

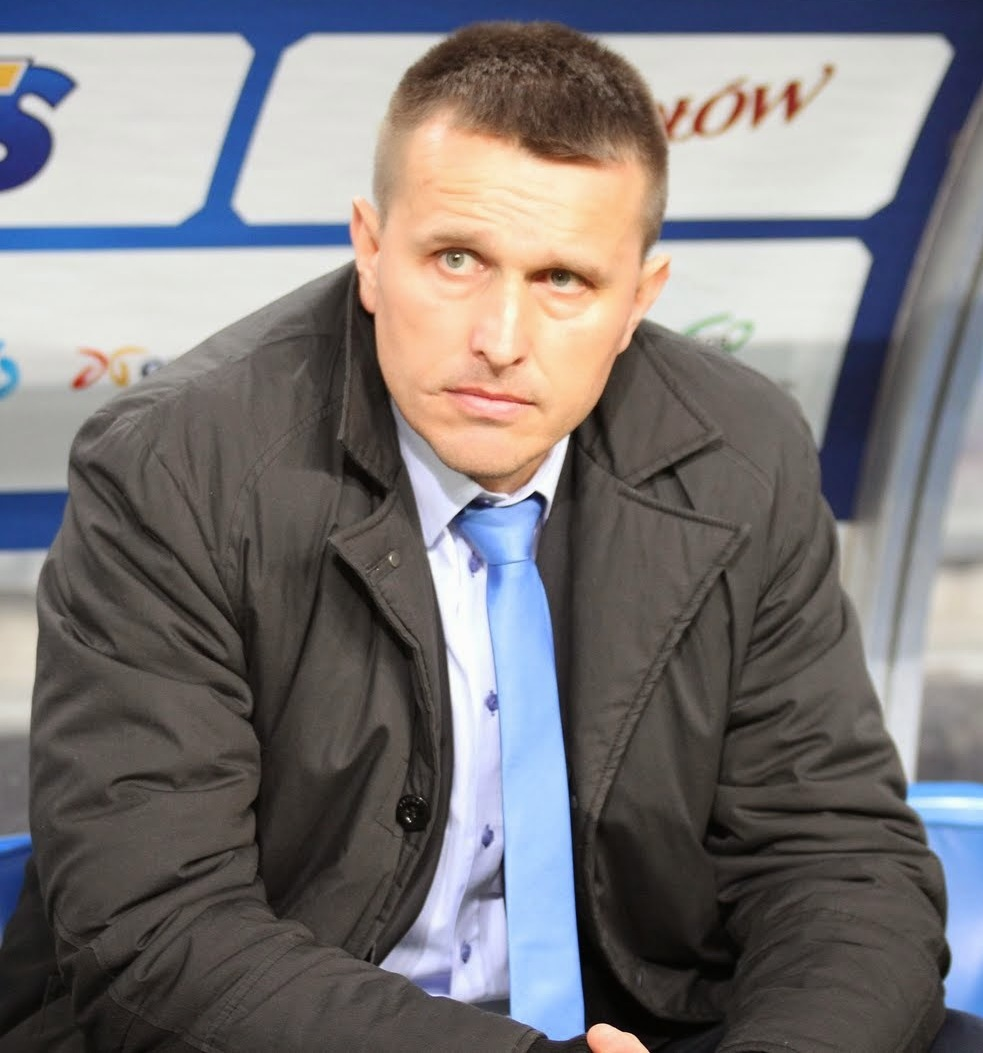
- Ojrzyński in 2014

Personal information
- Date of birth: 31 May 1972 (age 54)
- Place of birth: Ciechanów, Poland
- Position: Goalkeeper

Team information
- Current team: Zagłębie Lubin (manager)

Senior career*
Years	Team	Apps	(Gls)
- Pomowiec Sońsk
- Tęcza Płońsk
- AZS AWF Warsaw

Managerial career
- 2004: Milan Milanówek
- 2004–2005: Polonia Warsaw II
- 2006–2007: Znicz Pruszków
- 2007–2008: Wisła Płock
- 2008–2009: Raków Częstochowa
- 2010: Odra Wodzisław Śląski
- 2010–2011: Zagłębie Sosnowiec
- 2011–2013: Korona Kielce
- 2013–2015: Podbeskidzie Bielsko-Biała
- 2015–2016: Górnik Zabrze
- 2017–2018: Arka Gdynia
- 2019: Wisła Płock
- 2020–2021: Stal Mielec
- 2021–2022: Korona Kielce
- 2025–: Zagłębie Lubin
- * Club domestic league appearances and goals

Leszek Ojrzyński (born 31 May 1972) is a Polish professional football manager and former player who is currently in charge of Ekstraklasa club Zagłębie Lubin.

== Playing career ==
A former goalkeeper, Ojrzyński played for Pomowiec Sońsk, Tęcza Płońsk and AZS AWF Warsaw.

== Managerial career ==
At the start of his management career, Ojrzyński was in charge of Legia Warsaw youth teams, Milan Milanówek and the reserve team of Polonia Warsaw.

In December 2006, he was appointed head coach of third-tier Znicz Pruszków. With Ojrzyński in charge, Znicz earned promotion after finishing 1st in the league, with the club's striker Robert Lewandowski earning top scorer honours. Ojrzyński then went on to manage other I liga and II liga teams such as Wisła Płock, Raków Częstochowa, Odra Wodzisław Śląski and Zagłębie Sosnowiec.

He was the manager of Ekstraklasa teams such as Korona Kielce, Podbeskidzie Bielsko-Biała and Górnik Zabrze.

Ojrzyński was appointed manager of Arka Gdynia in April 2017. He led Arka to unlikely 2017–18 Polish Cup and 2018 Polish Super Cup wins, before leaving the club in June 2018.

On 11 November 2020, he was announced as the manager of Stal Mielec. On 12 April 2021, he was dismissed.

On 17 December 2021, Ojrzyński made his return to Korona Kielce, signing a contract to manage the team until the end of the 2022–23 season. Korona finished the season in fourth and entered promotion play-offs, won by Korona after a last-minute goal by Jacek Kiełb in extra-time of the final against Chrobry Głogów on 29 May 2022. However, the team struggled after their return to top flight, resulting in Ojrzyński being relieved of his duties following a 1–1 home draw against Piast Gliwice on 29 October 2022.

On 13 March 2025, he became the manager of top-flight side Zagłębie Lubin.

== Private life ==
His son is a goalkeeper Jakub Ojrzyński, who has represented the colours of Legia Warsaw II, Liverpool and Caernarfon Town.

== Managerial statistics ==
As of match played 21 November 2026

Managerial record by team and tenure
Team	From	To	Record							
Team	From	To	G	W	D	L	GF	GA	GD	Win %
Znicz Pruszków	4 December 2006	20 October 2007	38	24	6	8	82	34	+48	63.16
Wisła Płock	19 November 2007	1 May 2008	9	3	1	5	9	16	−7	33.33
Raków Częstochowa	20 August 2008	19 October 2009	45	21	9	15	62	44	+18	46.67
Odra Wodzisław	15 June 2010	23 September 2010	9	2	1	6	7	15	−8	22.22
Zagłębie Sosnowiec	13 October 2010	30 June 2011	22	9	9	4	31	18	+13	40.91
Korona Kielce	1 July 2011	5 August 2013	66	23	19	24	72	76	−4	34.85
Podbeskidzie Bielsko-Biała	22 October 2013	30 April 2015	61	23	19	19	79	83	−4	37.70
Górnik Zabrze	13 August 2015	3 March 2016	21	4	10	7	24	30	−6	19.05
Arka Gdynia	10 April 2017	30 June 2018	57	19	15	23	74	74	+0	33.33
Wisła Płock	4 April 2019	27 July 2019	11	5	3	3	16	15	+1	45.45
Stal Mielec	11 November 2020	12 April 2021	15	3	7	5	17	20	−3	20.00
Korona Kielce	17 December 2021	29 October 2022	33	10	11	12	43	46	−3	30.30
Zagłębie Lubin	13 March 2025	Present	62	25	16	21	82	73	+9	40.32
Total			456	171	133	152	597	544	+53	37.50

== Honours ==
=== Manager ===
Znicz Pruszków

- III liga, group I: 2006–07
- Polish Cup (Masovia regionals): 2006–07

Arka Gdynia

- Polish Cup: 2016–17
- Polish Super Cup: 2017

Individual

- Ekstraklasa Coach of the Month: April 2025, February 2026
