= Łukasz Piątek =

Polish footballer

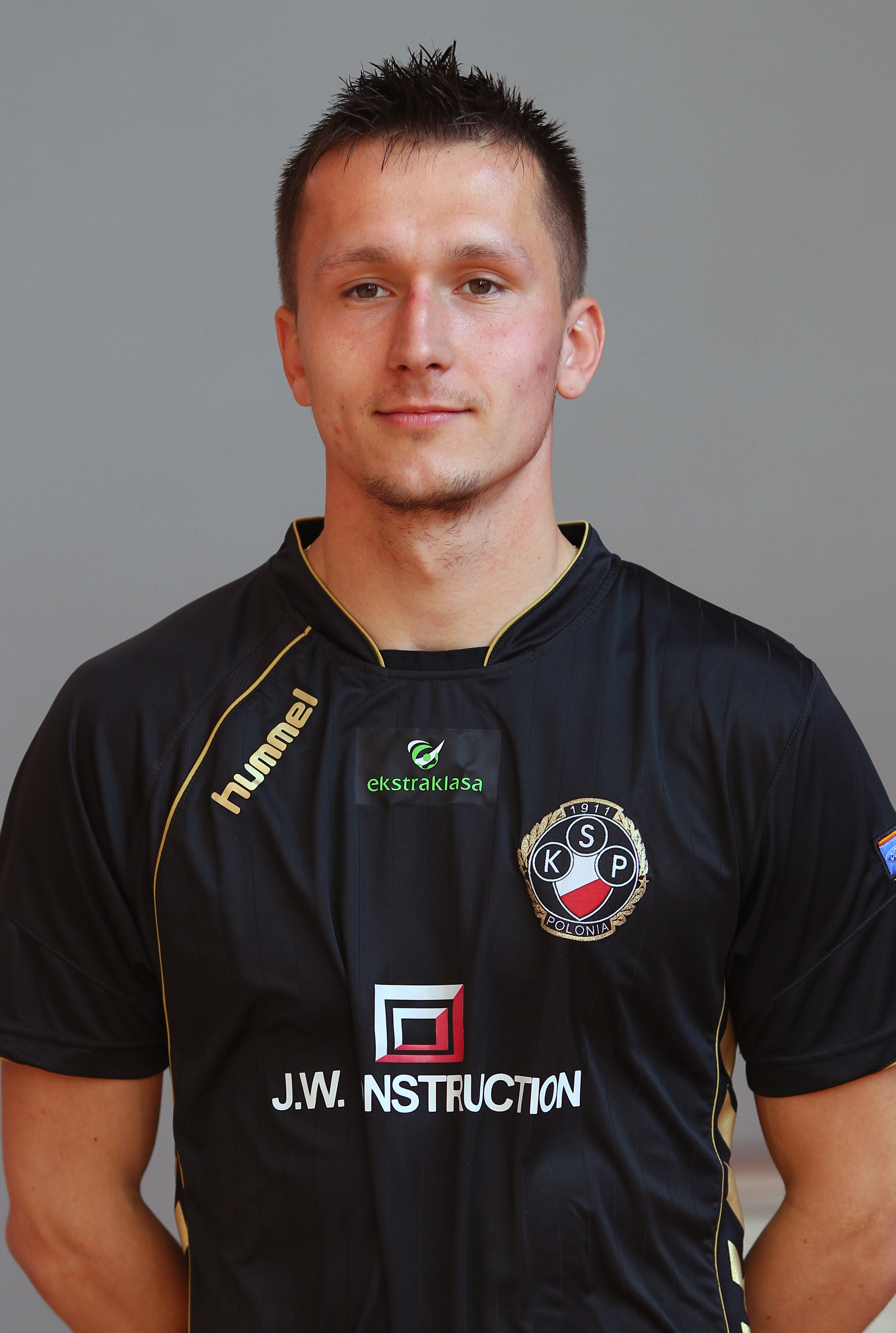

Personal information
- Full name: Łukasz Piątek
- Date of birth: 21 September 1985 (age 41)
- Place of birth: Warsaw, Poland
- Height: 1.80 m (5 ft 11 in)
- Position: Midfielder

Team information
- Current team: Polonia Warsaw U15 (assistant)

Youth career
- –2005: Polonia Warsaw

Senior career*
| Years | Team | Apps | (Gls) |
| 2005–2013 | Polonia Warsaw | 180 | (16) |
| 2013–2017 | Zagłębie Lubin | 123 | (9) |
| 2017–2018 | Bruk-Bet Termalica | 32 | (6) |
| 2018–2020 | ŁKS Łódź | 42 | (3) |
| 2020–2023 | Polonia Warsaw | 100 | (22) |
| Total | | 477 | (56) |
- * Club domestic league appearances and goals

Łukasz Piątek (born 21 September 1985) is a Polish former professional footballer who played as a midfielder. He currently serves as an assistant coach of Polonia Warsaw's under-15 team.

== Playing career ==
He began his career in the youth system of Polonia Warsaw. During the 2005–06 season, Piątek was promoted to the 1st team. Piątek played in two league games and two cup fixtures during that campaign. He was substituted in during the 21st minute against Odra Wodzisław Śląski earning his debut. The following season, he played in 16 matches scoring a goal.

On 21 June 2017, he signed a contract with Bruk-Bet Termalica Nieciecza.

On 26 September 2018, Piątek joined ŁKS Łódź.

On 14 July 2020, after seven years, he returned to Polonia Warsaw, then competing in III liga. With Piątek as the team's captain, Polonia won two promotions in a row, from III liga to II liga in 2021–22, and then to the second tier in May 2023. On 27 November 2023, it was announced his contract would not be extended and he was to leave the club at the end of the year. He made his 311th and final appearance for Polonia in the final minutes of a 2–2 draw against Stal Rzeszów on 1 December.

== Honours ==
Zagłębie Lubin

- I liga: 2014–15

Polonia Warsaw

- II liga: 2022–23
- III liga, group I: 2021–22
