= 2019–20 MKE Ankaragücü season =

MKE Ankaragücü
2019–20 season
- Chairman: Fatih Mert
- Manager: İbrahim Üzülmez
- Stadium: Eryaman Stadium
- Süper Lig: 18th
- Turkish Cup: Fourth round
- Top goalscorer: İlhan Parlak (7)
Home colours	Away colours	Third colours

The 2019–20 season was MKE Ankaragücü's 110th year in existence. In addition to the domestic league, MKE Ankaragücü participated in the Turkish Cup.

== Squad ==
As of 31 January 2020

Note: Flags indicate national team as defined under FIFA eligibility rules; some limited exceptions apply. Players may hold more than one non-FIFA nationality.

No.	Pos.	Nation	Player
1	GK	TUR	Korcan Çelikay
3	MF	TUR	Sedat Ağçay
4	DF	TUR	Mehmet Sak
7	FW	ARG	Óscar Scarione
8	DF	POR	Tiago Pinto
11	MF	TUR	Mahmut Akan
12	FW	JAM	Dever Orgill
13	DF	CRO	Ante Kulušić
14	MF	SEN	Ricardo Faty
15	MF	TUR	Orkan Çınar
17	MF	TUR	Ender Aygören
18	MF	POL	Konrad Michalak (on loan from Akhmat Grozny)
19	DF	TUR	Cebrail Karayel
20	MF	TUR	Aydın Karabulut
22	DF	POL	Michał Pazdan

No.	Pos.	Nation	Player
23	FW	TUR	İlhan Parlak
24	MF	GEO	Saba Lobzhanidze
25	GK	BRA	Ricardo Friedrich
27	MF	TUR	Ahmet Can Arık
29	MF	TUR	Oğuzhan Orhan
30	FW	VEN	Gelmin Rivas
35	MF	POL	Daniel Lukasik (on loan from Lechia Gdańsk)
45	FW	TUR	Alper Önal
55	MF	SRB	Miloš Stanojević
70	DF	GRE	Stelios Kitsiou
77	DF	TUR	Sitki Imdat
78	DF	TUR	Fatih Tultak
80	FW	TUR	Berke Gürbüz
89	DF	TUR	Atila Turan

== Süper Lig ==
=== League table ===
Pos	Team	Pld	W	D	L	GF	GA	GD	Pts
14	Denizlispor	34	9	8	17	31	48	−17	35 (Note: Head-to-head points: Denizlispor 4, Rizespor 1)
15	Rizespor	34	10	5	19	38	57	−19	35
16	Yeni Malatyaspor	34	8	8	18	44	51	−7	32 (Note: Head-to-head points: Yeni Malatyaspor 6, Kayserispor 5, Ankaragücü 5. Head-to-head goal difference: Yeni Malatyaspor +6, Kayserispor -3, Ankaragücü -3. Head-to-head goals scored: Yeni Malatyaspor 9, Kayserispor 4, Ankaragücü 3.)
17	Kayserispor	34	8	8	18	40	72	−32	32
18	Ankaragücü	34	7	11	16	31	56	−25	32

Source: Süper Lig, Soccerway
Rules for classification: 1) Points; 2) Head-to-head points; 3) Head-to-head goal difference; 4) Head-to-head goals scored; 5) Goal difference; 6) Goals scored; 7) Play-off.

=== Results summary ===
Overall								Home						Away					
Pld	W	D	L	GF	GA	GD	Pts	W	D	L	GF	GA	GD	W	D	L	GF	GA	GD
34	7	11	16	31	56	−25	32	4	4	9	15	30	−15	3	7	7	16	26	−10

Source: TFF

=== Results by round ===
Round	1	2	3	4	5	6	7	8	9	10	11	12	13	14	15	16	17	18	19	20	21	22	23	24	25	26	27	28	29	30	31	32	33	34
Ground	A	H	A	H	A	H	A	H	A	H	A	H	A	H	A	A	H	H	A	H	A	H	A	H	A	H	A	H	A	H	A	H	H	A
Result	D	D	W	L	L	W	L	D	L	L	L	L	L	L	D	D	D	L	D	D	W	W	L	L	L	W	D	L	D	L	D	W	L	W
Position	11	12	6	12	15	11	15	13	16	16	17	17	17	18	18	17	17	17	17	17	16	16	16	17	17	17	17	18	18	18	18	18	18	18

Source: TFF.org
A = Away; H = Home; W = Win; D = Draw; L = Loss

== Matches ==
August 18, 2019 1	Konyaspor	0–0	MKE Ankaragücü	Konya
19.15		Report	(yellow card) 24' İlhan Parlak; (yellow card) 90' Ricardo Faty	Stadium: Büyükşehir Belediye Stadyumu; Referee: Bülent Birincioğlu; Assistant referees: Mehmet Metin, Mehmet Kısal; Fourth official: Yakup Özhan; Fifth official: Özgür Yankaya, Hakan Ceylan

August 24, 2019 2	MKE Ankaragücü	1–1	Kayserispor	Ankara
19.15	Aydın Karabulut (yellow card) 38'; Dever Orgill 59' (yellow card) 77'; Stelios Kitsiou (yellow card) 90'	Report	(yellow card) 43' Atila Turan; 90' Umut Bulut	Stadium: Eryaman Stadium; Referee: Ali Şansalan; Assistant referees: İlker Takpak, İbrahim Bozbey; Fourth official: Sinan Derici; Fifth official: Bahattin Şimşek, Çağdaş Altay

August 30, 2019 3	Kasımpaşa	0–1	MKE Ankaragücü	Kasımpaşa, Beyoğlu, Istanbul
20.30	Karim Hafez (yellow card) 41'	Report	23' (yellow card) 45' İlhan Parlak; (yellow card) 39' Aydın Karabulut; (yellow card) 76' Tiago Pinto; (yellow card) 83' Ricardo Faty; (yellow card) 90' Zaur Sadayev	Stadium: Recep Tayyip Erdoğan Stadium; Referee: Zorbay Küçük; Assistant referees: Serkan Ok, Bilal Gölen; Fourth official: Mustafa Aydın; Fifth official: Tugay Kaan Numanoğlu, Esat Sancaktar

September 15, 2019 4	MKE Ankaragücü	0–4	Yeni Malatyaspor	Ankara
17.00	Ante Kulušić (yellow card) 29'; Stelios Kitsiou (yellow card) 45' (yellow card) 76' (red card); Tiago Pinto (yellow card) 90'	Report	(yellow card) 25' (goal) 82' Mitchell Donald; 26' Adis Jahović; 33' Thievy Bifouma; 43' Guilherme Costa Marques; (yellow card) 51' Ghaylen Chaaleli; (yellow card) 71' Afriyie Acquah	Stadium: Eryaman Stadium; Referee: Volkan Bayarslan; Assistant referees: Bahtiyar Birinci, Yusuf Bozdoğan; Fourth official: Bayram Başkan; Fifth official: Ümit Öztürk, Sarper Barış Saka

September 21, 2019 5	Fenerbahçe	2–1	MKE Ankaragücü	Istanbul
20.00	Zanka 20' (yellow card) 80'; Luiz Gustavo (yellow card) 62'; Vedat Muriqi 73'	Report	16' (yellow card) 24' Dever Orgill; (yellow card) 25' Cebrail Karayel; (yellow card) 44' Héctor Canteros	Stadium: Şükrü Saracoğlu Stadyumu; Attendance: 37.475; Referee: Abdulkadir Bitigen; Assistant referees: İbrahim Çağlar Uyarcan, Ali Saygın Ögel; Fourth official: Burak Şeker; Fifth official: Alper Ulusoy, Kemal Yılmaz

September 29, 2019 6	MKE Ankaragücü	2–1	Gençlerbirliği	Ankara
16.30	Daniel Candeias 56' (k.k.); İlhan Parlak 68'; Sedat Ağçay (yellow card) 55'	Report	(yellow card) 23' Zargo Touré; (yellow card) 55' Giovanni Sio; 75' (k.k.) Korcan Çelikay	Stadium: Eryaman Stadium; Attendance: 6.788; Referee: Ümit Öztürk; Assistant referees: Osman Gökhan Bilir, Kamil Çetin; Fourth official: Oğuzhan Uğurlu; Fifth official: Bülent Birincioğlu, Esat Sancaktar

October 6, 2019 7	Sivasspor	3–1	MKE Ankaragücü	Sivas
14.00	Mert Yandaş 26', 48'; Aaron Appindangoyé (yellow card) 44'; Uğur Çiftçi (yellow card) 54'; Erdoğan Yeşilyurt (yellow card) 79'; Marcelo Goiano (yellow card) 88'; Mustapha Yatabaré 90+2'	Report	15' Dever Orgill; (yellow card) 21' Hasan Kaya	Stadium: New Sivas 4 Eylül Stadium; Attendance: 7.841; Referee: Atilla Karaoğlan; Assistant referees: Özgür Ertem, Bilal Gölen; Fourth official: Serkan Önsal; Fifth official: Emre Malok, Murat Erdoğan

October 19, 2019 8	MKE Ankaragücü	0–0	Beşiktaş	Ankara
20.00	Tiago Pinto (yellow card) 23'; Sedat Ağçay (yellow card) 74' (yellow card) 74' (red card)	Report	(yellow card) 27' Caner Erkin; (yellow card) 57' Güven Yalçın; (yellow card) 83' Orkan Çınar; (yellow card) 87' Atiba Hutchinson	Stadium: Eryaman Stadium; Attendance: 17.093; Referee: Ali Şansalan; Assistant referees: Kemal Yılmaz, İsmail Şencan; Fourth official: Alper Çetin; Fifth official: Bahattin Şimşek, Cevdet Kömürcüoğlu

October 25, 2019 9	Çaykur Rizespor	2–0	MKE Ankaragücü	Rize
20.30	Braian Samudio 29' (pen.); Oğulcan Çağlayan (yellow card) 49'; Fernando Boldrin 59'	Report	(yellow card) 28' Alihan Kubalas; (yellow card) 52' Ante Kulušić; (yellow card) 75' Stelios Kitsiou	Stadium: Yeni Rize Şehir Stadium; Attendance: 6.151; Referee: Koray Gençerler; Assistant referees: Serkan Ok, Yusuf Bozdoğan; Fourth official: Mustafa Kürşad Filiz; Fifth official: Volkan Bayarslan, Mustafa Emre Eyisoy

November 4, 2019 10	MKE Ankaragücü	1–2	Gaziantep	Ankara
20.00	Tiago Pinto (yellow card) 43'; İlhan Parlak 68' (yellow card) 90+2'	Report	29' (pen.) Patrick Twumasi; (yellow card) 43' (goal) 90+3' Papy Djilobodji; (yellow card) 74' Souleymane Diarra	Stadium: Eryaman Stadium; Attendance: 3.427; Referee: Halil Umut Meler; Assistant referees: Cevdet Kömürcüoğlu, Kamil Çetin; Fourth official: Erkan Engin; Fifth official: Alper Ulusoy, Yiğit Arslan

November 10, 2019 11	İstanbul Başakşehir	2–1	MKE Ankaragücü	Istanbul
19.00	Enzo Crivelli 9', 77'; Arda Turan (yellow card) 85'	Report	(yellow card) 38' Stelios Kitsiou; (yellow card) 65' Mehmet Sak; 87' Aydın Karabulut	Stadium: Başakşehir Fatih Terim Stadium; Attendance: 2.243; Referee: Zorbay Küçük; Assistant referees: Mustafa Savranlar, Bilal Gölen; Fourth official: Ferhan Kestanlıoğlu; Fifth official: Fırat Aydınus, Mert Güzenge

November 23, 2019 12	MKE Ankaragücü	0–3	Trabzonspor	Ankara
17.30	İlhan Parlak (yellow card) 9'; Héctor Canteros (yellow card) 36'; Ricardo Faty (yellow card) 43' (yellow card) 45+1' (red card); Alihan Kubalas (yellow card) 88'	Report	6' Alexander Sørloth; 48' Yusuf Sari; 56' Anthony Nwakaeme	Stadium: Eryaman Stadium; Attendance: 15.130; Referee: Cüneyt Çakır; Assistant referees: Bahattin Duran, Tarık Ongun; Fourth official: Direnç Tonusluoğlu; Fifth official: Ali Şansalan, Kerem Ersoy

November 30, 2019 13	Alanyaspor	5–0	MKE Ankaragücü	Alanya, Antalya
17.30	Anastasios Bakasetas 16', 85'; Djalma Campos 24', 90', 90'; Papiss Cissé (yellow card) 57'	Report	(yellow card) 63' Cebrail Karayel; (yellow card) 90' Dever Orgill	Stadium: Bahçeşehir Okulları Stadium; Attendance: 4.424; Referee: Alper Ulusoy; Assistant referees: Mustafa Emre Eyisoy, Kemal Yılmaz; Fourth official: Emre Kargın; Fifth official: Emre Malok, Esat Sancaktar

December 7, 2019 14	MKE Ankaragücü	1–3	Göztepe	Ankara
17.30	İlhan Parlak 31'; Hasan Kaya (yellow card) 76'; Alper Önal (yellow card) 90+2'	Report	1' Halil Akbunar; (yellow card) 37' Alpaslan Öztürk; 47', 57' Serdar Gürler; (yellow card) 51' Cameron Jerome; (yellow card) 89' Soner Aydoğdu	Stadium: Eryaman Stadium; Attendance: 9.091; Referee: Mete Kalkavan; Assistant referees: Ceyhun Sesigüzel, Esat Sancaktar; Fourth official: Burak Taşkınsoy; Fifth official: Özgür Yankaya, Ramazan Keleş

December 14, 2019 15	Galatasaray	2–2	MKE Ankaragücü	Istanbul
20.00	Ryan Babel (yellow card) 32'; Sofiane Feghouli 53'; Younès Belhanda 83' (pen.); Marcão (yellow card) 86'	Report	(yellow card) 9' Ricardo Faty; (yellow card) 41' Cebrail Karayel; (yellow card) 45' (yellow card) 72' (red card) Dever Orgill; (yellow card) 82' Ante Kulušić; 88' (pen.) İlhan Parlak; 90+1' Stelios Kitsiou	Stadium: Türk Telekom Stadium; Attendance: 28.124; Referee: Ali Şansalan; Assistant referees: Serkan Ok, Mehmet Kısal; Fourth official: Mert Güzenge; Fifth official: Serkan Tokat, Ceyhun Sesigüzel

December 20, 2019 16	Antalyaspor	2–2	MKE Ankaragücü	Antalya
20.30	Amilton Minervino da Silva (yellow card) 16'; Chico 23'; Doğukan Sinik (yellow card) 65'; Gustavo Blanco Leschuk 80'	Report	(yellow card) 45' (goal) 56' Héctor Canteros; (yellow card) 51' Ante Kulušić; 90+4' Stelios Kitsiou; (yellow card) 90+4' Alper Önal	Stadium: New Antalya Stadium; Attendance: 9.103; Referee: Fırat Aydınus; Assistant referees: Kerem Ersoy, Aleks Taşçıoğlu; Fourth official: Mustafa Kürşad Filiz; Fifth official: Arda Kardeşler, Tugay Kaan Numanoğlu

December 28, 2019 17	MKE Ankaragücü	2–2	Denizlispor	Ankara
15.00	Alihan Kubalas (yellow card) 27'; Dever Orgill (yellow card) 44'; Óscar Scarione 66', 84'	Report	(red card) 10' Modou Barrow; 22' Mustafa Yumlu; 45' Hugo Rodallega; (yellow card) 81' Radosław Murawski	Stadium: Eryaman Stadium; Attendance: 8.493; Referee: Arda Kardeşler; Assistant referees: Candaş Elbil, Bilal Gölen; Fourth official: Yakup Özhan; Fifth official: Tugay Kaan Numanoğlu, Mert Güzenge

January 17, 2020 18	MKE Ankaragücü	0–1	Konyaspor	Ankara
20.00		Report	(yellow card) 35' Deni Milošević; 90+2' Levan Shengelia	Stadium: Eryaman Stadium; Attendance: 9.820; Referee: Alper Ulusoy; Assistant referees: Samet Çavuş, Abdullah Bora Özkara; Fourth official: Yalçın Taşkınfurat; Fifth official: Tugay Kaan Numanoğlu, Oğuzhan Uğurlu

January 25, 2020 19	Kayserispor	1–1	MKE Ankaragücü	Kayseri
14.00	Bernard Mensah 23' (pen.) (yellow card) 54'; Emre Demir (yellow card) 44'; Gustavo Campanharo (yellow card) 68'; Pedro Henrique (yellow card) 76'; Ben Rienstra (yellow card) 90+3'	Report	Cebrail Karayel (yellow card) 17' (yellow card) 48' (red card); Tiago Pinto (yellow card) 28'; Sedat Ağçay (yellow card) 29'; Héctor Canteros (yellow card) 33'; Alihan Kubalas 68' (yellow card) 90+1'	Stadium: Kadir Has Şehir Stadyumu; Attendance: 6.747; Referee: Cüneyt Çakır; Assistant referees: Alpaslan Dedeş, Candaş Elbil; Fourth official: İlker Yasin Avcı; Fifth official: Suat Arslanboğa, Kutluhan Bilgiç

February 2, 2020 20	MKE Ankaragücü	1–1	Kasımpaşa	Ankara
13.30	Gerson Rodrigues 50' (pen.); Ricardo Faty (yellow card) 77'; Dever Orgill (yellow card) 83'; Ante Kulušić (yellow card) 90+3'	Report	7' Mame Baba Thiam; (yellow card) 22' Tarkan Serbest; (yellow card) 45+1' Dieumerci Ndongala; (yellow card) 83' Ricardo Quaresma	Stadium: Eryaman Stadium; Attendance: 13.600; Referee: Halil Umut Meler; Assistant referees: Bahattin Duran, İlker Takpak; Fourth official: Hakan Ülker; Fifth official: Ali Şansalan, Emre Kargın

February 7, 2020 21	Yeni Malatyaspor	0–1	MKE Ankaragücü	Malatya
20.00	Mustafa Akbaş (red card) 49'; Ahmed Ildiz (yellow card) 85'	Report	66' Dever Orgill; (yellow card) 89' Atila Turan; (yellow card) 90+1' Tiago Pinto	Stadium: Malatya Arena; Attendance: 4.500; Referee: Fırat Aydınus; Assistant referees: Aleks Taşcıoğlu, Erdem Bayık; Fourth official: Bilal Köseoğlu; Fifth official: Mustafa Öğretmenoğlu, Yiğit Arslan

February 15, 2020 22	MKE Ankaragücü	2–1	Fenerbahçe	Ankara
20.00	Saba Lobzhanidze 13'; Gerson Rodrigues 75'; İlhan Parlak (yellow card) 89'	Report	(yellow card) 41' Mauricio Isla; (yellow card) 84' Luiz Gustavo; 90+6' Serdar Aziz	Stadium: Eryaman Stadium; Attendance: 18.012; Referee: Mete Kalkavan; Assistant referees: Ceyhun Sesigüzel, Serkan Ok; Fourth official: Caner Ak; Fifth official: Volkan Bayarslan, Alper Çetin

February 23, 2020 23	Gençlerbirliği	1–0	MKE Ankaragücü	Ankara
16.00	Erdem Özgenç (yellow card) 61'; Yasin Pehlivan (yellow card) 70'; Giovanni Sio 74'	Report	(yellow card) 32' Ante Kulušić; (yellow card) 44' Daniel Łukasik; (yellow card) 88' Ricardo Faty	Stadium: Eryaman Stadium; Attendance: 5.651; Referee: Ali Şansalan; Assistant referees: İsmail Şencan, Kamil Çetin; Fourth official: Mustafa Aydın; Fifth official: Burak Şeker, Erkan Engin

March 1, 2020 24	MKE Ankaragücü	0–3	Sivasspor	Ankara
16.00	Miloš Stojanović (yellow card) 31' (yellow card) 36' (red card)	Report	(yellow card) 56' Emre Kılınç; 69' Hakan Arslan; (penalty missed) 74' 74' Mert Hakan Yandaş; (yellow card) 76' Uğur Çiftçi; 90+1' Mustapha Yatabaré	Stadium: Eryaman Stadium; Attendance: 14.656; Referee: Ümit Öztürk; Assistant referees: Mehmet Salih Mazlum, Deniz Caner Özaral; Fourth official: Veli Karakaya; Fifth official: Emre Malok, Emre Kargın

March 6, 2020 25	Beşiktaş	2–1	MKE Ankaragücü	Istanbul
20.00	Burak Yılmaz 6' (pen.); Jeremain Lens (yellow card) 41'; Víctor Ruiz (yellow card) 47'; Mohamed Elneny (yellow card) 52'; Adem Ljajić 88'	Report	(yellow card) 21' Dever Orgill; (yellow card) 37' Daniel Łukasik; (yellow card) 38' Sedat Ağçay; (yellow card) 82' Ricardo Faty; (yellow card) 83' Konrad Michalak; 90+3' (pen.) İlhan Parlak	Stadium: Vodafone Park; Attendance: 24.602; Referee: Ali Şansalan; Assistant referees: Mehmet Cem Hanoğlu, Bahtiyar Birinci; Fourth official: Cihan Aydın; Fifth official: Koray Gençerler, Kerem Ersoy

March 13, 2020 26	MKE Ankaragücü	2–1	Çaykur Rizespor	Ankara
20.00	Burak Albayrak 17' (o.g.); Konrad Michalak (yellow card) 20'; Gerson Rodrigues 22'; Ante Kulušić (yellow card) 57'	Report	45+1' Denys Harmash; (yellow card) 64' Ismaël Diomandé; (yellow card) 90+2' (yellow card) 90+4' (red card) Mykola Morozyuk	Stadium: Eryaman Stadium; Attendance: 0 Referee: Yaşar Kemal Uğurlu; Assistant referees: Erdinç Sezertam, Samet Çiçek; Fourth official: Cihan Aydın; Fifth official: Mustafa Öğretmenoğlu, Abdullah Buğra Taşkınsoy

June 14, 2020 27	Gaziantep	1–1	MKE Ankaragücü	Gaziantep
21.00	Alexandru Maxim 25' (pen.); Souleymane Diarra (yellow card) 68'; Patrick Twumasi (yellow card) 85'; Júnior Morais (yellow card) 90'	Report	(yellow card) 32' Daniel Łukasik; 51' Óscar Scarione; (yellow card) 73' Michał Pazdan; (yellow card) 90+4' Sedat Ağçay	Stadium: New Gaziantep Stadium; Attendance: 0 Referee: Mete Kalkavan; Assistant referees: Ceyhun Sesigüzel, Esat Sancaktar; Fourth official: Mustafa Kürşad Filiz; Fifth official: Hüseyin Göçek, Kutluhan Bilgiç

June 19, 2020 28	MKE Ankaragücü	1–2	İstanbul Başakşehir	Ankara
21.00	Martin Škrtel (yellow card) 10'; Danijel Aleksić 59' (yellow card) 61'; Edin Višća 73'; Enzo Crivelli (yellow card) 76'; Mert Günok (yellow card) 90+1'	Report	12' (pen.) (yellow card) 61' Gerson Rodrigues; (yellow card) 40' Daniel Łukasik; (yellow card) 48' Ricardo Faty; (yellow card) 65' Stelios Kitsiou	Stadium: Eryaman Stadium; Attendance: 0 Referee: Hüseyin Göçek; Assistant referees: Serkan Ok, Süleyman Özay; Fourth official: Mert Güzenge; Fifth official: Mustafa Öğretmenoğlu, Erkan Engin

June 27, 2020 29	Trabzonspor	1–1	MKE Ankaragücü	Trabzon
21.00	Alexander Sørloth 3'; Abdülkadir Ömür (yellow card) 45+3'; João Pereira (yellow card) 52'; Gastón Campi (yellow card) 54'; José Sosa (yellow card) 61'	Report	(yellow card) 31' Michał Pazdan; (yellow card) 39' Ante Kulušić; (yellow card) 43' Sedat Ağçay; (yellow card) 45+1' Scarione; (yellow card) 57' Tiago Pinto; 63' (pen.) (yellow card) 70' (yellow card) 82' (red card) Gerson Rodrigues; (yellow card) 83' Dever Orgill	Stadium: Şenol Güneş Stadium; Attendance: 0 Referee: Abdulkadir Bitigen; Assistant referees: Kemal Yılmaz, İbrahim Çağlar Uyarcan; Fourth official: Murat Erdoğan; Fifth official: Suat Arslanboğa, Mustafa Kürşad Filiz

July 4, 2020 30	MKE Ankaragücü	1–4	Alanyaspor	Ankara
18.30	Dever Orgill (penalty missed) 44'; Stelios Kitsiou (yellow card) 57'; Gelmin Rivas (yellow card) 77' (goal) 82'	Report	(yellow card) 42' Welinton; 64' Papiss Cissé; 66' Onur Bulut; 78' (pen.) Anastasios Bakasetas; (yellow card) 89' Emircan Altıntaş; 90' Júnior Fernándes	Stadium: Eryaman Stadium; Attendance: 0 Referee: Halil Umut Meler; Assistant referees: Cevdet Kömürcüoğlu, Samet Çiçek; Fourth official: Hakan Ceylan; Fifth official: Ali Şansalan, Emre Kargın

July 8, 2020 31	Göztepe	2–2	MKE Ankaragücü	İzmir
21.00	Kamil Wilczek 26' (pen.); Soner Aydoğdu (yellow card) 35' (goal) 45+3'; Titi (yellow card) 90+1'	Report	17' Dever Orgill; (yellow card) 31' Gerson Rodrigues; (yellow card) 49' (goal) 58' (pen.) Daniel Łukasik; (yellow card) 61' Stelios Kitsiou; (yellow card) 90+6' Ante Kulušić	Stadium: Bornova Stadium; Attendance: 0 Referee: Fırat Aydınus; Assistant referees: Aleks Taşcıoğlu, Erdem Bayık; Fourth official: Caner Ak; Fifth official: Özgür Yankaya, Çağdaş Altay

July 12, 2020 32	MKE Ankaragücü	1–0	Galatasaray	Ankara
18.30	Michał Pazdan (yellow card) 32'; Stelios Kitsiou (yellow card) 55'; Ezequiel Óscar Scarione 62' (pen.); Dever Orgill (yellow card) 69'	Report	(yellow card) 17' Younès Belhanda; (yellow card) 34' Marcão; (yellow card) 87' Marcelo Saracchi	Stadium: Eryaman Stadium; Attendance: 0 Referee: Atilla Karaoğlan; Assistant referees: Esat Sancaktar, Samet Çavuş; Fourth official: Mert Güzenge; Fifth official: Volkan Bayarslan, Abdullah Buğra Taşkınsoy

July 19, 2020 33	MKE Ankaragücü	0–1	Antalyaspor	Ankara
21.00		Report		Stadium: Eryaman Stadium; Attendance: 0 Referee: Cüneyt Çakır; Assistant referees: Bahattin Duran, Tarık Ongun; Fourth official: Turgut Doman

July 2020 34	Denizlispor	0–1	MKE Ankaragücü	Denizli
		Report		Stadium: Atatürk Stadyumu
