= Stadion Miejski (Gdynia) =

Football stadium in Gdynia, Poland

Coordinates: 54°29′35.29″N 18°31′52.37″E

- Stadion GOSiR
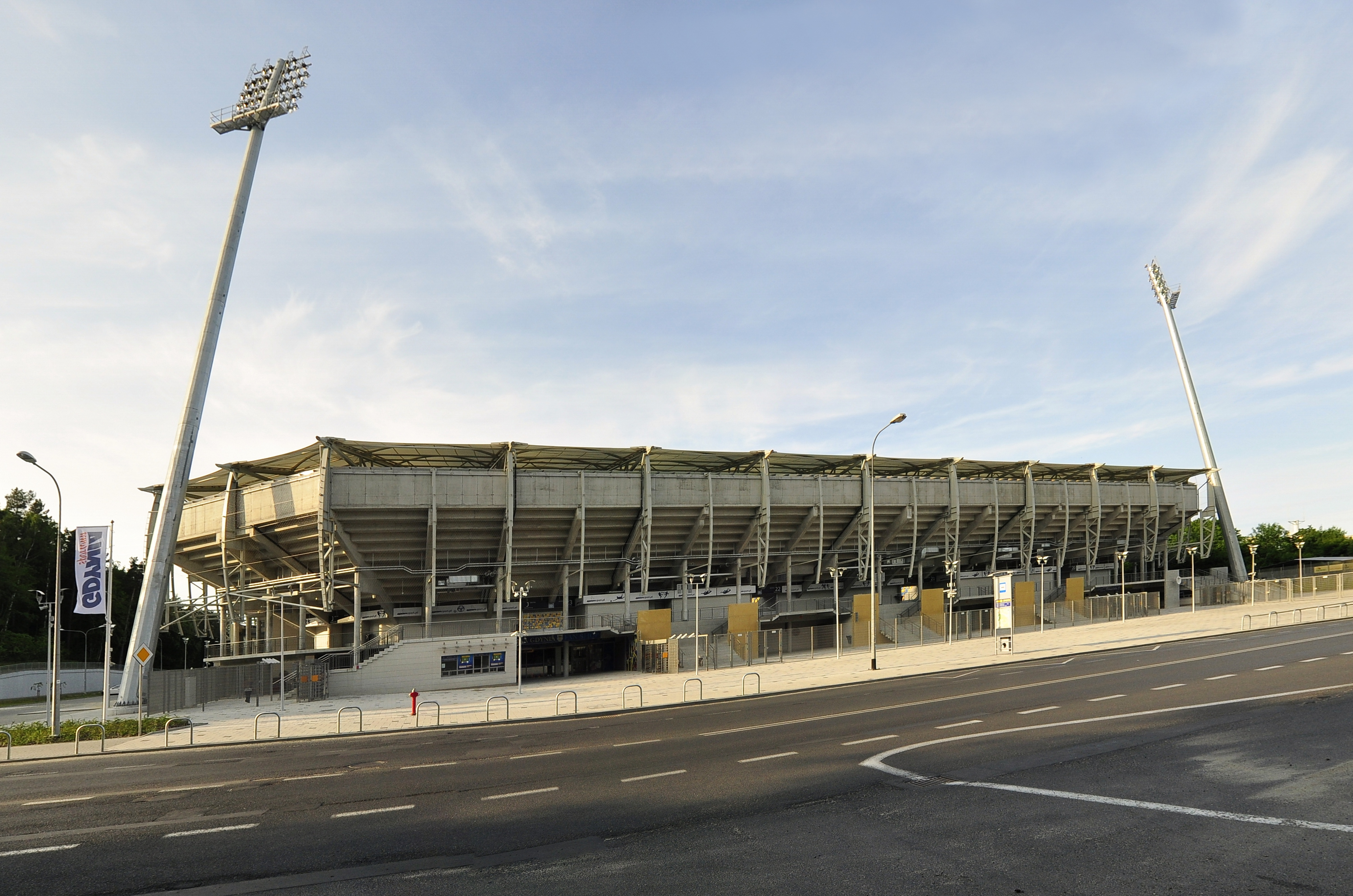
- Interactive map of Stadion Miejski
- Full name: Stadion Miejski w Gdyni
- Location: Gdynia, Poland
- Operator: Gdyńskie Centrum Sportu
- Capacity: 15,139
- Field size: 105 m x 68 m

Construction
- Built: 2011
- Opened: 19 February 2011
- Cost: 78.4 million PLN (18.5 million euro)
- Architect: Studio Projektowe SPAK

Tenants
- Arka Gdynia: Major sporting events hosted; 2017 UEFA Under-21 Euro 2019 FIFA U-20 World Cup

Stadion Miejski (English: Municipal Stadium), also known as Stadion GOSiR, is a football stadium in Gdynia, Poland. It is the home ground of Arka, but has also hosted several international games, including those of the Poland youth national team. The stadium holds 15,139 people and replaced an obsolete ground by the same name that stood here since 1964. In 2017, it serves as one of the venues for the 2017 UEFA European Under-21 Championship and hosted several matches of the 2019 FIFA U-20 World Cup, including the third place match.

== Construction ==
Designed by Warsaw-based firm SPAK, Gdynia was able to improve stadium standards, though the structure also earned some criticism as the roof only partially covers the seating area and was constructed using steel supports, thus creating obstructed view seating in some sections. Despite this, the Gdynia municipality preferred said design over a more efficient cantilever-style roof due to budget constraints. Demolition of the previous stadium began on 1 December 2009, with challenging foundation work started over the duration of a harsh winter. By May 2010, the first completed stand reached its maximum height at 20 rows of terracing. The work carried out by Budimex-Dromex was due to end in late 2010, but were finished in the early weeks of 2011 after delays.

== Inauguration ==
The opening ceremony of the stadium was held on 19 February 2011, with a historical exhibition match against Beroe Stara Zagora. The choice of opposition is due to Arka's historical links with Beroe as their first UEFA Cup Winners' Cup opponent in 1979. The game ended 1–1 with goals from Evgeni Yordanov and Emil Noll.

19 February 2011
18:30 UTC

Arka Gdynia	1–1	Beroe Stara Zagora
Emil Noll 90+5'		Evgeni Yordanov 64'

Municipal Stadium, Gdynia
Attendance: 13,500
Referee: Paul Drechsel

Arka Gdynia (4–4–2):
GK	39	Marcelo Moretto
DF	32	Adrian Sulima (substituted off) 62'
DF	2	Ante Rožić (substituted off) 76'
DF	23	Maciej Szmatiuk
DF	20	Emil Noll
FW	18	Giovanni Vemba-Duarte
DF	8	Michał Płotka
MF	7	Pawel Zawistowski
MF	25	Filip Burkhardt (substituted off) 76'
LW	19	Miroslav Božok (substituted off) 65'
FW	21	Joseph Desire Mawaye (substituted off) 46'
Substitutions:
DF	41	Tomasz Mokwa	(substituted on) 62'
DF	29	Robert Bednarek	(substituted on) 65'
DF	28	Krystian Żołnierewicz	(substituted on) 76'
MF	31	Paweł Czoska	(substituted on) 76'
FW	24	Junior Ross	(substituted on) 46'
Manager:
Dariusz Pasieka

Beroe Stara Zagora (4–4–2):
GK	33	Teodor Skorchev (substituted off) 63'
RB	4	Vladislav Yamukov (substituted off) 79'
CB	23	Aleksandar Tomash (substituted off) 79'
CB	24	Stanislav Bachev (substituted off) 79'
LB	28	Veselin Penev
RM	20	Nikolay Stankov (substituted off) 76'
CM	10	Diyan Genchev (substituted off) 60'
CM	16	Stefan Velev
LM	21	Todor Hristov (substituted off) 79'
CF	19	Vladislav Zlatinov (substituted off) 69'
CF	14	Evgeni Yordanov (substituted off) 79'
Substitutions:
GK	1	Martin Temenliev	(substituted on) 63'
DF	25	Miroslav Enchev	(substituted on) 79'
DF	30	Pavel Kovachev	(substituted on) 79'
DF	3	Todor Todorov	(substituted on) 79'
MF	18	Petar Kostadinov	(substituted on) 60'
MF	71	Milen Tanev	(substituted on) 76'
MF	9	Ivo Gyurov	(substituted on) 79'
MF	17	Martin Raynov	(substituted on) 79'
MF	6	Simeon Mechev	(substituted on) 69'
Manager:
Ilian Iliev

== See also ==
- List of football stadiums in Poland
