= 2015–16 Legia Warsaw season =

Legia Warsaw
2015–16 season
- Manager: Henning Berg (until 5 October 2015); Stanislav Cherchesov (from 6 October 2015)
- Stadium: Polish Army Stadium
- Ekstraklasa: 1st
- Polish Cup: Winners
- Polish Super Cup: Runners-up
- UEFA Europa League: Group stage
- Top goalscorer: League: Nemanja Nikolić (28); All: Nemanja Nikolić (36)
- Biggest win: 5–0 v Podbeskidzie Bielsko-Biała (Home, 26 July 2015, Ekstraklasa)
- Biggest defeat: 2–5 v Napoli (Away, 10 December 2015, UEFA Europa League); 0–3 v Nieciecza (Away, 2 March 2016, Ekstraklasa)
Home colours	Away colours	Third colours

The 2015–16 season was Legia Warsaw's 69th consecutive season in the Ekstraklasa and 81st season in existence as a football club. In addition to the domestic league, the club participated in the Polish Cup, the Polish Super Cup and the UEFA Europa League.

Henning Berg was dismissed as manager of Legia Warsaw on 5 October 2015 after the club's poor start to the season left them fourth in the Ekstraklasa and ten points behind leaders. He was replaced the following day by Stanislav Cherchesov, who signed a contract until the end of the season.

== Squad ==
Squad at end of season

Note: Flags indicate national team as defined under FIFA eligibility rules; some limited exceptions apply. Players may hold more than one non-FIFA nationality.

No.	Pos.	Nation	Player
1	GK	POL	Arkadiusz Malarz
2	DF	POL	Michał Pazdan
3	MF	POL	Tomasz Jodłowiec
4	DF	POL	Igor Lewczuk
5	DF	POL	Artur Jędrzejczyk
6	MF	BRA	Guilherme
7	MF	POL	Ariel Borysiuk
8	MF	SVK	Ondrej Duda
9	FW	POL	Marek Saganowski
11	FW	HUN	Nemanja Nikolić
14	DF	CZE	Adam Hloušek
15	MF	POL	Michał Kopczyński
16	MF	POL	Michał Masłowski
17	DF	POL	Tomasz Brzyski

No.	Pos.	Nation	Player
18	MF	POL	Michał Kucharczyk
19	DF	POL	Bartosz Bereszyński
20	FW	POL	Jarosław Niezgoda
22	MF	FIN	Kasper Hämäläinen
23	MF	BIH	Stojan Vranješ
25	DF	POL	Jakub Rzeźniczak
28	DF	POL	Łukasz Broź
29	GK	POL	Jakub Szumski
33	GK	POL	Radosław Cierzniak
45	FW	POL	Adam Ryczkowski
47	DF	POL	Rafał Makowski
77	MF	BUL	Mihail Aleksandrov
91	GK	POL	Radosław Majecki
99	FW	SUI	Aleksandar Prijović

== Competitions ==
=== Overview ===
Competition	First match	Last match	Starting round	Final position	Record							
Competition	First match	Last match	Starting round	Final position	Pld	W	D	L	GF	GA	GD	Win %
Ekstraklasa	19 July 2015	15 May 2016	Matchday 1	Winners	37	21	10	6	70	32	+38	56.76
Polish Cup	12 August 2015	2 May 2016	Round of 32	Winners	7	7	0	0	19	4	+15	100.00
Polish Super Cup	10 July 2015		Final	Runners-up	1	0	0	1	1	3	−2	0.00
UEFA Europa League	16 July 2015	10 December 2015	Second qualifying round	Group stage	12	7	1	4	16	12	+4	58.33
Total					57	35	11	11	106	51	+55	61.40

Source: Competitions

=== Ekstraklasa ===
==== Regular season ====
===== League table =====
Pos	Team	Pld	W	D	L	GF	GA	GD	Pts	Qualification
1	Legia Warsaw	30	17	9	4	58	28	+30	60	Qualification for the championship round
2	Piast Gliwice	30	17	7	6	49	36	+13	58	Qualification for the championship round
3	Pogoń Szczecin	30	10	16	4	36	30	+6	46	Qualification for the championship round
4	Zagłębie Lubin	30	12	9	9	41	37	+4	45 (Note: Head-to-head record: Zagłębie - Cracovia 4–2, Cracovia - Zagłębie 1–2.)	Qualification for the championship round
5	Cracovia	30	12	9	9	57	42	+15	45	Qualification for the championship round

Source: Ekstraklasa, Soccerway
Rules for classification: 1) Points; 2) Head-to-head points; 3) Head-to-head goal difference; 4) Head-to-head goals scored; 5) Head-to-head away goals scored (only if two teams); 6) Goal difference; 7) Goals scored; 8) Fairplay ranking; 9) Draw. (Note: Head-to-head record is used only after all the matches between the teams in question have been played).

===== Results summary =====
Overall								Home						Away					
Pld	W	D	L	GF	GA	GD	Pts	W	D	L	GF	GA	GD	W	D	L	GF	GA	GD
30	17	9	4	58	28	+30	60	8	5	2	28	12	+16	9	4	2	30	16	+14

Source: Soccerway

===== Results by round =====
Round	1	2	3	4	5	6	7	8	9	10	11	12	13	14	15	16	17	18	19	20	21	22	23	24	25	26	27	28	29	30
Ground	A	H	A	H	A	H	A	H	A	H	A	H	H	A	H	H	A	H	A	H	A	H	A	H	A	H	A	A	H	A
Result	W	W	W	D	L	L	D	D	W	D	D	W	L	W	W	W	D	W	W	D	W	W	W	W	L	W	W	W	D	D
Position	1	1	1	1	2	3	3	3	2	3	4	3	4	2	2	2	2	2	2	2	2	2	2	1	2	1	1	1	1	1
Points	3	6	9	10	10	10	11	12	15	16	17	20	20	23	26	29	30	33	36	37	40	43	46	49	49	52	55	58	59	60

Source: Worldfootball.net
A = Away; H = Home; W = Win; D = Draw; L = Loss

===== Matches =====
19 July 2015 1	Śląsk Wrocław	1–4	Legia Warsaw	Wrocław
18:00 CEST (UTC+2)	Paixão 28'; Pawełek (yellow card) 77'	Report	Furman 33'; Jodłowiec 53'; Rzeźniczak (yellow card) 56'; Brzyski (yellow card) 59'; Nikolić 71', 90'	Stadium: Wrocław Stadium; Referee: K. Jakubik

26 July 2015 2	Legia Warsaw	5–0	Podbeskidzie Bielsko-Biała	Warsaw
18:00 CEST (UTC+2)	Jaroch 4' (o.g.); Nikolić 33'; Kucharczyk 41'; Rzeźniczak (yellow card) 56'; Żyro 75'; Duda 88'	Report	Sokołowski (yellow card) 45'; Jaroch (yellow card) 71'	Stadium: Polish Army Stadium; Referee: B. Frankowski

2 August 2015 3	Górnik Łęczna	0–2	Legia Warsaw	Łęczna
18:00 CEST (UTC+2)		Report	Nikolić 16', 33'; Pazdan (yellow card) 59'; Furman (yellow card) 74'	Stadium: Łęczna Stadium; Referee: T. Musial

9 August 2015 4	Legia Warsaw	1–1	Wisła Kraków	Warsaw
18:00 CEST (UTC+2)	Furman 44'; Rzeźniczak (yellow card) 57'; Kuciak (yellow card) 64'; Makowski (yellow card) 89'	Report	Guzmics (yellow card) 41'; Boguski (penalty missed) 59'; Guerrier 64'; Burliga (yellow card) 68'; Jankowski (yellow card) 80'	Stadium: Polish Army Stadium; Referee: D. Stefanski

15 August 2015 5	Piast Gliwice	2–1	Legia Warsaw	Gliwice
20:30 CEST (UTC+2)	Nešpor 27'; Murawski (yellow card) 37'; Barišić (yellow card) 48'; Živec 85'	Report	Nikolić 7', (yellow card) 45'	Stadium: Stadion Piast; Referee: S. Marciniak

23 August 2015 6	Legia Warsaw	1–2	Korona Kielce	Warsaw
18:00 CEST (UTC+2)	Furman (yellow card) 5'; Nikolić 58' (pen.)	Report	Trytko 2', (yellow card) 3'; Zając (yellow card) 7'; Dejmek (yellow card) 58'; Jovanović (yellow card) 82'; Przybyła 90+3'	Stadium: Polish Army Stadium; Attendance: 16,381; Referee: P. Lasyk

30 August 2015 7	Jagiellonia Białystok	1–1	Legia Warsaw	Białystok
18:00 CEST (UTC+2)	Gajos 55'	Report	Duda (yellow card) 11'; Guilherme 39'; Rzeźniczak (yellow card) 60'	Stadium: Stadion Miejski; Attendance: 22,172; Referee: D. Stefanski

11 September 2015 8	Legia Warsaw	2–2	Zagłębie Lubin	Warsaw
20:30 CEST (UTC+2)	Vranješ (yellow card) 39'; Kucharczyk (yellow card) 53'; Trichkovski 69'; Nikolić 74'	Report	Piątek 17', (yellow card) 30'; Papadopulos (yellow card) 21', (goal) 35'	Stadium: Polish Army Stadium; Attendance: 14,798; Referee: S. Marciniak

20 September 2015 9	Ruch Chorzów	1–4	Legia Warsaw	Chorzów
15:30 CEST (UTC+2)	Stępiński 21'; Konczkowski (yellow card) 87'	Report	Nikolić 1'; Vranješ 10'; Kucharczyk 12'; Prijović 59'; Furman (yellow card) 75'	Stadium: Ruch Chorzów Stadium; Attendance: 9,300; Referee: M. Zlotek

27 September 2015 10	Legia Warsaw	1–1	Nieciecza	Warsaw
18:00 CEST (UTC+2)	Nikolić 60'; Broź (yellow card) 90+4'	Report	Jarecki (yellow card) 51'; Juhar 58'; Pleva (yellow card) 75'	Stadium: Polish Army Stadium; Attendance: 14,020; Referee: K. Jakubik

4 October 2015 11	Górnik Zabrze	2–2	Legia Warsaw	Zabrze
15:30 CEST (UTC+2)	Shevelyukhin (yellow card) 5'; Sobolewski (yellow card) 31'; Vidanov (yellow card) 37'; Kwiek (yellow card) 76' (yellow-red card) 80'; Kasprzik (yellow card) 89'	Report	Nikolić 20' (pen.), 40'; Guilherme (yellow card) 26'	Stadium: Ernest Pohl Stadium; Attendance: 8,570; Referee: T. Musial

18 October 2015 12	Legia Warsaw	3–1	Cracovia	Warsaw
18:00 CEST (UTC+2)	Nikolić 5', 53', 54'; Pazdan (yellow card) 70'	Report	Deleu (yellow card) 18'; Kapustka (yellow card) 40'; Jendrišek 80'	Stadium: Polish Army Stadium; Attendance: 17,315

25 October 2015 13	Legia Warsaw	0–1	Lech Poznań	Warsaw
18:00 CET (UTC+1)	Kucharczyk (yellow card) 90'	Report	Hämäläinen 8'; Kádár (yellow card) 65'; Ceesay (yellow card) 82'; Douglas (yellow card) 90+1'; Jevtić (yellow card) 90+3'	Stadium: Polish Army Stadium; Attendance: 26,831; Referee: B. Frankowski

31 October 2015 14	Lechia Gdańsk	1–3	Legia Warsaw	Gdańsk
18:00 CET (UTC+1)	Borysiuk (yellow card) 22'; Peszko (yellow card) 52'; Kovačević 54'; Kuświk (yellow card) 82'; Mila (yellow card) 89'	Report	Duda (yellow card) 28'; Guilherme 31'; Pazdan (yellow card) 42'; Brzyski (yellow card) 43'; Nikolić 50'; Jodłowiec 58'; Saganowski (yellow card) 89'	Stadium: PGE Arena Gdańsk; Attendance: 19,285

8 November 2015 15	Legia Warsaw	1–0	Pogoń Szczecin	Warsaw
18:00 CET (UTC+1)	Jodłowiec 12'	Report		Stadium: Polish Army Stadium; Attendance: 14,780; Referee: T. Musial

21 November 2015 16	Legia Warsaw	1–0	Śląsk Wrocław	Warsaw
18:00 CET (UTC+1)	Guilherme (yellow card) 60'; Prijović 72'; Nikolić (yellow card) 78'	Report	Pawelec (yellow card) 6'; Dankowski (yellow card) 59'; Kiełb (yellow card) 62'; Biliński (yellow card) 82'	Stadium: Polish Army Stadium; Attendance: 17,875; Referee: K. Jakubik

29 November 2015 17	Podbeskidzie Bielsko-Biała	2–2	Legia Warsaw	Bielsko-Biała
15:30 CET (UTC+1)	Demjan 6'; Kolčák (red card) 0'; Lewczuk 86' (o.g.)	Report	Duda (yellow card) 20'; Lewczuk (yellow card) 59'; Nikolić 68'; Jodłowiec (yellow card) 72'; Vranješ 90+3'	Stadium: Bielsko-Biała Stadium; Attendance: 4,368; Referee: B. Frankowski

2 December 2015 18	Legia Warsaw	2–1	Górnik Łęczna	Warsaw
18:00 CET (UTC+1)	Nikolić 4', 30'	Report	Bednarek (yellow card) 32'; Szmatiuk (yellow card) 38'; Bonin 87'; Leândro (yellow card) 90+1'	Stadium: Polish Army Stadium; Attendance: 8,125; Referee: M. Zlotek

6 December 2015 19	Wisła Kraków	0–2	Legia Warsaw	Kraków
18:00 CET (UTC+1)	Guerrier (yellow card) 32'	Report	Brzyski (yellow card) 27'; Pazdan (yellow card) 73'; Nikolić 85'; Prijović 90+3'	Stadium: Henryk Reyman Municipal Stadium; Attendance: 20,100; Referee: J. Przybyl

13 December 2015 20	Legia Warsaw	1–1	Piast Gliwice	Warsaw
18:00 CET (UTC+1)	Duda (yellow card) 57'; Lewczuk (yellow card) 58'; Hebert 62' (o.g.); Kucharczyk (yellow card) 67'; Guilherme (yellow card) 81'	Report	Vacek (yellow card) 58'; Badía 79'	Stadium: Polish Army Stadium; Attendance: 21,191; Referee: S. Marciniak

20 December 2015 21	Korona Kielce	1–3	Legia Warsaw	Kielce
15:30 CET (UTC+1)	B. Pawłowski (yellow card) 38'; Sierpina 42'; Jovanović (yellow card) 46'	Report	Jodłowiec (yellow card) 41'; Guilherme 45'; Kucharczyk 55'; Nikolić 59'	Stadium: Kolporter Arena; Attendance: 9,136; Referee: D. Stefanski

14 February 2016 22	Legia Warsaw	4–0	Jagiellonia Białystok	Warsaw
18:00 CET (UTC+1)	Nikolić 7', 58'; Kucharczyk 17'; Vranješ (yellow card) 63'; Jodłowiec 84'	Report	Tomasik (yellow card) 62'; Góralski (yellow card) 82'	Stadium: Polish Army Stadium; Attendance: 25,675; Referee: T. Musial

21 February 2016 23	Zagłębie Lubin	1–2	Legia Warsaw	Lubin
15:30 CET (UTC+1)	Piątek 50'; Zbozień (yellow card) 65'; Luís Carlos (yellow card) 76'; Čotra (yellow card) 90+3'	Report	Prijović 2'; Kucharczyk (yellow card) 28', (goal) 38'; Guilherme (yellow card) 34'	Stadium: Lubin Stadium; Attendance: 8,858; Referee: M. Zlotek

28 February 2016 24	Legia Warsaw	2–0	Ruch Chorzów	Warsaw
18:00 CET (UTC+1)	Oleksy 31' (o.g.); Hloušek 49'; Duda (yellow card) 51'; Jodłowiec (yellow card) 54'; Lewczuk (yellow card) 73'	Report	Grodzicki (yellow card) 53'	Stadium: Polish Army Stadium; Attendance: 24,021; Referee: P. Gil

2 March 2016 25	Nieciecza	3–0	Legia Warsaw	Nieciecza
18:00 CET (UTC+1)	W. Kędziora 36'; Mišák (yellow card) 42', (goal) 52'; Plizga 90+3'	Report		Stadium: Stadion Sportowy Bruk-Bet Termalica; Attendance: 4,595; Referee: B. Frankowski

5 March 2016 26	Legia Warsaw	3–1	Górnik Zabrze	Warsaw
20:30 CET (UTC+1)	Hloušek 45+2'; Kucharczyk (yellow card) 57'; Jędrzejczyk 63'; Prijović 76'	Report	Madej (yellow card) 31'; Steblecki 38'	Stadium: Polish Army Stadium; Attendance: 23,358; Referee: J. Przybyl

12 March 2016 27	Cracovia	1–2	Legia Warsaw	Kraków
18:00 CET (UTC+1)	Jendrišek 8'; Kapustka (yellow card) 34'; Cetnarski (yellow card) 84'; Deleu (yellow card) 88'	Report	Guilherme 3', (yellow card) 60'; Lewczuk (yellow card) 63'; Prijović 83'; Masłowski (yellow card) 90+3'	Stadium: Józef Piłsudski Cracovia Stadium; Attendance: 14,000; Referee: B. Frankowski

19 March 2016 28	Lech Poznań	0–2	Legia Warsaw	Poznań
20:30 CET (UTC+1)	Tetteh (yellow card) 45'; Trałka (yellow card) 60'	Report	Pazdan (yellow card) 39'; Nikolić 42', 45+1' (pen.); Aleksandrov (yellow card) 73'; Duda (yellow card) 76'	Stadium: INEA Stadion; Attendance: 41,567; Referee: S. Marciniak

2 April 2016 29	Legia Warsaw	1–1	Lechia Gdańsk	Warsaw
20:30 CEST (UTC+2)	Duda 21'; Hloušek (yellow card) 22'; Borysiuk (red card) 56'; Pazdan (yellow card) 62'; Jędrzejczyk (yellow card) 80'; Guilherme (yellow card) 86'	Report	Peszko (yellow card) 28'; Kuświk 47'; Chrapek (yellow card) 90'	Stadium: Polish Army Stadium; Attendance: 28,131; Referee: D. Stefanski

9 April 2016 30	Pogoń Szczecin	0–0	Legia Warsaw	Szczecin
18:00 CEST (UTC+2)	Akahoshi (yellow card) 45'; Gyurcsó (yellow card) 54'	Report	Rzeźniczak (yellow card) 20'; Pazdan (yellow card) 80'	Stadium: Florian Krygier Municipal Stadium; Attendance: 14,348; Referee: P. Lasyk

==== Championship round ====
===== League table =====
Pos	Team	Pld	W	D	L	GF	GA	GD	Pts	Qualification
1	Legia Warsaw (C)	37	21	10	6	70	32	+38	43	Qualification for the Champions League second qualifying round (Note: Legia Warsaw qualified for the Europa League second qualifying round by winning the 2015–16 Polish Cup. However, since they already qualified for European competition based on their league position, the spot awarded to the cup winners was passed down the league.)
2	Piast Gliwice	37	20	9	8	60	45	+15	40	Qualification for the Europa League second qualifying round
3	Zagłębie Lubin	37	17	9	11	55	42	+13	38	Qualification for the Europa League first qualifying round
4	Cracovia	37	16	10	11	66	50	+16	36	Qualification for the Europa League first qualifying round
5	Lechia Gdańsk (Note: Lechia Gdańsk were punished with a deduction of one point during regular season for failing with licensing requirements. On 8 April 2016 the punishment was suspended by Polish Court of Arbitration for Sport.On 11 April 2016 an appeal against the original decision was withdrawn by the club.)	37	14	10	13	53	44	+9	32	
6	Pogoń Szczecin	37	12	17	8	43	43	0	30	
7	Lech Poznań	37	14	6	17	42	47	−5	27	
8	Ruch Chorzów (Note: Ruch Chorzów were punished with a deduction of one point during regular season for failing with licensing requirements.)	37	11	8	18	40	60	−20	21	

Source: Ekstraklasa, Soccerway
Rules for classification: 1) Points; 2) Points in regular season; 3) Head-to-head points in regular season; 4) Head-to-head goal difference in regular season; 5) Head-to-head goals scored in regular season; 5) Head-to-head away goals scored in regular season (if only two teams); 7) Goal difference; 8) Goals scored; 9) Fairplay ranking; 10) Play-off (only if needed to decide champion, teams for relegation or teams for UEFA competitions).
(C) Champions

===== Results summary =====
Overall								Home						Away					
Pld	W	D	L	GF	GA	GD	Pts	W	D	L	GF	GA	GD	W	D	L	GF	GA	GD
7	4	1	2	12	4	+8	13	4	0	0	12	0	+12	0	1	2	0	4	−4

Source: Worldfootball

===== Results by round =====
Round	31	32	33	34	35	36	37
Ground	H	A	H	A	H	A	H
Result	W	D	W	L	W	L	W
Position	1	1	1	1	1	1	1
Points	33	34	37	37	40	40	43

Source: Worldfootball
A = Away; H = Home; W = Win; D = Draw; L = Loss

===== Matches =====
15 April 2016 31	Legia Warsaw	1–0	Lech Poznań	Warsaw
20:30 CEST (UTC+2)	Kucharczyk (yellow card) 61'; Prijović 62'; Borysiuk (yellow card) 66'; Guilherme (yellow card) 79'; Lewczuk (yellow card) 90'; Jędrzejczyk (yellow card) 90+4'	Report	Trałka (yellow card) 57'; Jóźwiak (yellow card) 90'	Stadium: Polish Army Stadium; Attendance: 28,286; Referee: D. Stefanski

19 April 2016 32	Ruch Chorzów	0–0	Legia Warsaw	Chorzów
20:30 CEST (UTC+2)	Grodzicki (yellow card) 29'	Report	Borysiuk (yellow card) 45+1'	Stadium: Ruch Chorzów Stadium; Attendance: 8,300; Referee: S. Krasny

22 April 2016 33	Legia Warsaw	4–0	Cracovia	Warsaw
20:30 CEST (UTC+2)	Prijović 6'; Kucharczyk 25'; Nikolić 32'; Hämäläinen 77'; Jodłowiec (yellow card) 83'	Report	Kapustka (yellow card) 29'; Deleu (yellow card) 38'	Stadium: Polish Army Stadium; Attendance: 24,061; Referee: J. Przybyl

28 April 2016 34	Zagłębie Lubin	2–0	Legia Warsaw	Lubin
18:00 CEST (UTC+2)	Tosik 12', (yellow card) 55'; Piątek 44'	Report	Duda (yellow card) 28'; Kucharczyk (yellow card) 55'; Borysiuk (yellow card) 79'; Hloušek (yellow card) 90+4'	Stadium: Lubin Stadium; Attendance: 9,015; Referee: B. Frankowski

8 May 2016 35	Legia Warsaw	4–0	Piast Gliwice	Warsaw
18:00 CEST (UTC+2)	Lewczuk 28'; Guilherme 45'; Hämäläinen 54'; Nikolić 69' (pen.)	Report	Vacek (yellow card) 40'; Sapała (yellow card) 81'	Stadium: Polish Army Stadium; Attendance: 29,245; Referee: S. Marciniak

11 May 2016 36	Lechia Gdańsk	2–0	Legia Warsaw	Gdańsk
20:30 CEST (UTC+2)	Krasić (yellow card) 12', (goal) 50'; Peszko 20', (yellow card) 82'; Wojtkowiak (yellow card) 42'; Chrapek (yellow card) 55'	Report	Lewczuk (yellow card) 38' (yellow-red card) 63'; Jędrzejczyk (yellow card) 90'	Stadium: Stadion Energa Gdańsk; Attendance: 22,415; Referee: T. Musial

15 May 2016 37	Legia Warsaw	3–0	Pogoń Szczecin	Warsaw
18:00 CEST (UTC+2)	Czerwiński 14' (o.g.); Pazdan (yellow card) 25'; Nikolić 83', (yellow card) 85'; Hämäläinen 86'	Report	Matras (yellow card) 80'	Stadium: Polish Army Stadium; Attendance: 29,381; Referee: D. Stefanski

=== Polish Cup ===
12 August 2015 Round of 32	Górnik Łęczna	0–2	Legia Warsaw	Łęczna
20:30 CEST (UTC+2)	Bielák (yellow card) 58'	Report	Rzeźniczak (yellow card) 19'; Bereszyński (yellow card) 66'; Saganowski 72'; Prijović 83'	Stadium: Łęczna Stadium

24 September 2015 Round of 16	Legia Warsaw	4–1	Lechia Gdańsk	Warsaw
20:30 CEST (UTC+2)	Prijović 26', 85'; Nikolić 63'; Lewczuk (yellow card) 75'	Report	Peszko (yellow card) 44'; Borysiuk (yellow card) 69'; Mak 77'; Wojtkowiak (yellow card) 83'	Stadium: Polish Army Stadium; Attendance: 17,000

28 October 2015 Quarter-finals First leg	Chojniczanka Chojnice	1–2	Legia Warsaw	Chojnice
18:00 CET (UTC+1)	Mrozik (yellow card) 31'; Lisowski (yellow card) 44'; Mikita 49'; Bartoszewicz (yellow card) 73'; Grzelak (yellow card) 85'	Report	Guilherme (yellow card) 19'; Vranješ 24'; Bereszyński (yellow card) 69'; Duda 80'	Stadium: Stadion Miejski

18 November 2015 Quarter-finals Second leg	Legia Warsaw	4–1 (6–2 agg.)	Chojniczanka Chojnice	Warsaw
20:45 CET (UTC+1)	Vranješ 30', (red card) 87'; Prijović 34'; Brzyski 39'; Nikolić 64'; Kopczyński (yellow card) 72'	Report	Rybski 5'; Biernat (yellow card) 87'	Stadium: Polish Army Stadium
Note: Legia Warsaw won 6–2 on aggregate.

16 March 2016 Semi-finals First leg	Legia Warsaw	4–0	Zawisza Bydgoszcz	Warsaw
18:30 CEST (UTC+2)	Nikolić 6', 63', 79'; Broź 50'; Borysiuk (yellow card) 57'; Duda (penalty missed) 73'	Report	Drygas (yellow card) 34'; Igumanović (yellow card) 45'	Stadium: Polish Army Stadium; Attendance: 14,912; Referee: K. Jakubik

6 April 2016 Semi-finals Second leg	Zawisza Bydgoszcz	1–2 (1–6 agg.)	Legia Warsaw	Bydgoszcz
18:00 CEST (UTC+2)	Drygas (yellow card) 42'; Danielak 60'	Report	Nikolić 16'; Lewczuk (yellow card) 26'; Kopczyński (yellow card) 73'; Guilherme 79'	Stadium: Stadion Miejski im. Zdzisława Krzyszkowiaka; Attendance: 2,343; Referee: H. Kimura (Japan)
Note: Legia Warsaw won 6–1 on aggregate.

2 May 2016 Final	Lech Poznań	0–1	Legia Warsaw	Warsaw
16:00 CEST (UTC+2)	S. Pawłowski (yellow card) 42'; Trałka (yellow card) 56'	Report	Prijović (yellow card) 38', (goal) 69'; Pazdan (yellow card) 90+3'; Jędrzejczyk (yellow card) 90+10'; Guilherme (yellow card) 90+11'	Stadium: Stadion Narodowy; Attendance: 48,563; Referee: S. Marciniak

=== Polish Super Cup ===
As the defending Polish Cup champions, Legia Warsaw faced the reigning Ekstraklasa winners Lech Poznań in the Polish Super Cup.

10 July 2015 Final	Lech Poznań	3–1	Legia Warsaw	Poznań
20:15 CEST (UTC+2)	T. Kędziora 10'; Douglas (yellow card) 31'; Robak (yellow card) 32'; Kamiński 35'; Kádár (yellow card) 58'; Linetty 87'	Report	Rzeźniczak (yellow card) 32'; Żyro 90+5'	Stadium: INEA Stadion; Referee: M. Zlotek

=== UEFA Europa League ===
==== Qualifying ====
===== Second qualifying round =====
16 July 2015 First leg	Legia Warsaw (Poland)	1–0	(Romania) Botoșani	Warsaw, Poland
21:00 CEST (UTC+2)	Broź (yellow card) 54'; Rzeźniczak (yellow card) 58'; Guilherme (yellow card) 64'; Duda 78', (yellow card) 78'	Report	Cordoș (yellow card) 20'; Vașvari (yellow card) 60'; Cucu (yellow card) 62'	Stadium: Polish Army Stadium; Attendance: 10,446; Referee: Ante Vučemilović-Šimunović Jr. (Croatia); Assistant referees: Dalibor Conjar (Croatia), Igor Krmar (Croatia); Fourth official: Bruno Marić (Croatia)

23 July 2015 Second leg	Botoșani (Romania)	0–3 (0–4 agg.)	(Poland) Legia Warsaw	Botoșani, Romania
20:00 EEST (UTC+3)	Cordoș (yellow card) 32'; Costin (yellow card) 67'	Report	Guilherme 7'; Nikolić 38' (pen.); Prijović 87'	Stadium: Botoșani Municipal Stadium; Attendance: 5,353; Referee: Alexandre Boucaut (Belgium); Assistant referees: Jimmy Cremers (Belgium), Rien Vanyzere (Belgium); Fourth official: Christophe Delacour (Belgium)
Note: Legia Warsaw won 4–0 on aggregate.

===== Third qualifying round =====
30 July 2015 First leg	Kukësi (Albania)	0–3; Awarded (Note: The match was abandoned in the 52nd minute with a 2–1 lead for Legia Warsaw after a Legia Warsaw player was hit in the head by an object thrown from the crowd. On 4 August 2015, UEFA awarded Legia Warsaw with a 3–0 win against Kukësi Kukësi were given a €70,000 fine and ordered to play their next home match behind closed doors.)	(Poland) Legia Warsaw	Tirana, Albania (Note: The match was played at the Qemal Stafa Stadium in Tirana, instead of Kukësi regular stadium, the Zeqir Ymeri Stadium, in Kukës.)
20:00 CEST (UTC+2)	Flores (yellow card) 21'; Jefferson (yellow card) 26'; Felipe Moreira (yellow card) 34', (goal) 49'; Jean Carioca (yellow card) 43'	Report	Duda (yellow card) 18'; Nikolić 29'; Rzeźniczak 51'	Stadium: Qemal Stafa Stadium; Attendance: 5,000; Referee: Stephan Klossner (Switzerland); Assistant referees: Vital Jobin (Switzerland), Remy Zgraggen (Switzerland); Fourth official: Sascha Amhof (Switzerland)

6 August 2015 Second leg	Legia Warsaw (Poland)	1–0 (4–0 agg.)	(Albania) Kukësi	Warsaw, Poland
21:00 CEST (UTC+2)	Bereszyński (yellow card) 28'; Kucharczyk 47'; Furman (yellow card) 53'	Report	Birungueta (yellow card) 58'	Stadium: Polish Army Stadium; Attendance: 11,847; Referee: Tony Chapron (France); Assistant referees: Nicolas Danos (France), Alexandre Viala (France); Fourth official: Wilfried Bien (France)
Note: Legia Warsaw won 4–0 on aggregate.

==== Play-off round ====
20 August 2015 First leg	Zorya Luhansk (Ukraine)	0–1	(Poland) Legia Warsaw	Kyiv, Ukraine (Note: The match was played at the Valeriy Lobanovskyi Dynamo Stadium in Kyiv, instead of Zorya Luhansk regular stadium, the Avanhard Stadium, in Luhansk, due to the war conditions in Eastern Ukraine.)
20:00 EEST (UTC+3)	Chaykovskyi (yellow card) 30'; Ljubenović (yellow card) 57'; Hordiyenko (yellow card) 61'; Sivakow (yellow card) 89'	Report	Guilherme (yellow card) 8'; Kucharczyk 48'; Jodłowiec (yellow card) 71'	Stadium: Valeriy Lobanovskyi Dynamo Stadium; Attendance: 16,000; Referee: Anastasios Sidiropoulos (Greece); Assistant referees: Damianos Efthimiadis (Greece), Polychronis Kostaras (Greece); Fourth official: Ilias Spathas (Greece)

27 August 2015 Second leg	Legia Warsaw (Poland)	3–2 (4–2 agg.)	(Ukraine) Zorya Luhansk	Warsaw, Poland
21:00 CEST (UTC+2)	Pazdan (yellow card) 2'; Brzyski 16'; Guilherme 62'; Rzeźniczak (yellow card) 65'; Duda (yellow card) 90+4', (goal) 90+5'	Report	Kamenyuka (yellow card) 37'; Khomchenovskyi 39'; Sivakow (yellow card) 45+2'; Malinovskyi 66'; Budkivskyi (yellow card) 79'; Opanasenko (yellow card) 90+5'	Stadium: Polish Army Stadium; Attendance: 23,163; Referee: Tobias Welz (Germany); Assistant referees: Rafael Foltyn, Holger Henschel; Fourth official: Robert Hartmann
Note: Legia Warsaw won 4–2 on aggregate.

==== Group stage ====
Pos	Team	Pld	W	D	L	GF	GA	GD	Pts	Qualification	NAP	MID	BRU	LEG
1	(Italy) Napoli	6	6	0	0	22	3	+19	18	Advance to knockout phase	—	5–0	5–0	5–2
2	(Denmark) Midtjylland	6	2	1	3	6	12	−6	7	Advance to knockout phase	1–4	—	1–1	1–0
3	(Belgium) Club Brugge	6	1	2	3	4	11	−7	5		0–1	1–3	—	1–0
4	(Poland) Legia Warsaw	6	1	1	4	4	10	−6	4		0–2	1–0	1–1	—

Source: Soccerway
Rules for classification: Group stage tiebreakers

17 September 2015 1	Midtjylland (Denmark)	1–0	(Poland) Legia Warsaw	Herning, Denmark
19:00 CEST (UTC+2)	Rasmussen 60', (yellow card) 65'; Poulsen (yellow card) 85'	Report	Guilherme (yellow card) 59'; Furman (yellow card) 74' (yellow-red card) 88'; Kuciak (yellow card) 90+4'	Stadium: MCH Arena; Attendance: 6,798; Referee: Hüseyin Göçek (Turkey); Assistant referees: Emre Eyisoy (Turkey), Orkun Aktaş (Turkey); Fourth official: Serkan Ok (Turkey); Goal-line assistants: Barış Şimşek (Turkey), Süleyman Abay (Turkey)

1 October 2015 2	Legia Warsaw (Poland)	0–2	(Italy) Napoli	Warsaw, Poland
21:05 CEST (UTC+2)	Rzeźniczak (yellow card) 44'	Report	Mertens 53'; Higuaín 84'	Stadium: Polish Army Stadium; Attendance: 26,357; Referee: Michael Koukoulakis (Greece); Assistant referees: Alexandros Grevenis (Greece), Chrysoula Kourompylia (Greece); Fourth official: Christos Baltas (Greece); Goal-line assistants: Athenasios Giachos (Greece), Andreas Pappas (Greece)

22 October 2015 3	Legia Warsaw (Poland)	1–1	(Belgium) Club Brugge	Warsaw, Poland
21:05 CEST (UTC+2)	Rzeźniczak (yellow card) 50'; Kucharczyk 51'	Report	De fauw 39'	Stadium: Polish Army Stadium; Attendance: 16,320; Referee: Harald Lechner (Austria); Assistant referees: Maximilian Kolbitsch (Austria), Andreas Heidenreich (Austria); Fourth official: Andreas Staudinger (Austria); Goal-line assistants: Alexander Harkam (Austria), Julian Weinberger (Austria)

5 November 2015 4	Club Brugge (Belgium)	1–0	(Poland) Legia Warsaw	Bruges, Belgium
19:00 CET (UTC+1)	Meunier 38'; De Bock (yellow card) 72'	Report	Saganowski (yellow card) 27'; Pazdan (yellow card) 77'; Guilherme (yellow card) 83'	Stadium: Jan Breydel Stadium; Attendance: 16,349; Referee: Marijo Strahonja (Croatia); Assistant referees: Ivica Modrić (Croatia), Dario Vrabec (Croatia); Fourth official: Hrvoje Radić (Croatia); Goal-line assistants: Fran Jović (Croatia), Mario Zebec (Croatia)

26 November 2015 5	Legia Warsaw (Poland)	1–0	(Denmark) Midtjylland	Warsaw, Poland
21:05 CET (UTC+1)	Prijović 35'; Duda (yellow card) 46'; Żyro (yellow card) 87'	Report	Rømer (yellow card) 39'; Sparv (yellow card) 45'; Poulsen (yellow card) 84'	Stadium: Polish Army Stadium; Attendance: 9,468; Referee: Andre Marriner (England); Assistant referees: Michael Mullarkey (England), John Brooks (England); Fourth official: Michael Salisbury (England); Goal-line assistants: Robert Madley (England), Lee Mason (England)

10 December 2015 6	Napoli (Italy)	5–2	(Poland) Legia Warsaw	Naples, Italy
19:00 CET (UTC+1)	Chalobah 32', (yellow card) 89'; Insigne 39'; Strinić (yellow card) 55'; Callejón 57'; Mertens 65', 90+1'	Report	Vranješ 62'; Prijović 90+2'	Stadium: Stadio San Paolo; Attendance: 7,922; Referee: Aleksandar Stavrev (Macedonia); Assistant referees: Marjan Kirovski (Macedonia), Dejan Kostadinov (Macedonia); Fourth official: Nikola Karakolev (Macedonia); Goal-line assistants: Dimitar Meckarovski (Macedonia), Dejan Jakimovksi (Macedonia)

== Awards ==
=== Ekstraklasa top scorer ===
Player	Goals	Ref.
(Hungary) Nemanja Nikolić	28	
