= 2020–21 MKE Ankaragücü season =

MKE Ankaragücü
2020–21 season
- President: Fatih Mert
- Manager: Fuat Çapa (until 22 November 2020); Mustafa Dalcı (from 23 January 2021)
- Stadium: Eryaman Stadium
- Süper Lig: 19th (relegated)
- Turkish Cup: Third round
- Top goalscorer: League: Joseph Paintsil (11 goals); All: Joseph Paintsil (11 goals)
Home colours	Away colours	Third colours
- All statistics correct as of 15 May 202021.

The 2020–21 season was MKE Ankaragücü's 111th season in existence and the club's third consecutive season in the top flight of Turkish football. In addition to the domestic league, Ankaragücü participated in this season's editions of the Turkish Cup. The season covers the period from July 2020 to 30 June 2021.

== Players ==
=== Current squad ===
As of 5 October 2020

Note: Flags indicate national team as defined under FIFA eligibility rules; some limited exceptions apply. Players may hold more than one non-FIFA nationality.

No.	Pos.	Nation	Player
1	GK	TUR	Korcan Çelikay
2	DF	POL	Michał Pazdan
4	DF	TUR	Erdi Dikmen
6	MF	TUR	Atakan Çankaya
7	MF	SRB	Luka Adžić (on loan from Anderlecht)
8	DF	POR	Tiago Pinto
9	FW	COD	Jonathan Bolingi (on loan from Antwerp)
10	MF	TUR	Orkan Çınar
11	MF	GEO	Saba Lobzhanidze
13	DF	CRO	Ante Kulušić
14	MF	SEN	Assane Dioussé (on loan from Saint-Étienne)
17	MF	TUR	Ender Aygören
18	MF	GER	Şahverdi Çetin
19	DF	TUR	Cebrail Karayel
20	MF	TUR	Alper Potuk

No.	Pos.	Nation	Player
21	FW	TUR	Berke Gürbüz
22	FW	NOR	Torgeir Børven
25	GK	BRA	Ricardo Friedrich
26	FW	TUR	Mücahit Can Akçay
28	MF	GHA	Joseph Paintsil (on loan from Genk)
35	DF	POL	Daniel Łukasik
42	MF	KOS	Idriz Voca
50	DF	CRO	Zvonimir Šarlija
55	DF	TUR	Murat Sipahioğlu
66	GK	TUR	Mert Topuz
70	DF	GRE	Stelios Kitsiou
77	FW	TUR	Emre Güral
88	MF	ALB	Endri Çekiçi
89	DF	TUR	Atila Turan
99	GK	TUR	Furkan Bekleviç

=== Out on loan ===
Note: Flags indicate national team as defined under FIFA eligibility rules; some limited exceptions apply. Players may hold more than one non-FIFA nationality.

No.	Pos.	Nation	Player
28	FW	GER	Hasan Kaya (at 24 Erzincanspor)

== Transfers ==
=== In ===
No.	Pos	Player	Transferred from	Fee	Date	Source
15			TBD		1 July 2020	

=== Out ===
No.	Pos	Player	Transferred to	Fee	Date	Source
15			TBD		1 July 2020	

== Pre-season and friendlies ==
Win Draw Loss Fixtures

== Competitions ==
=== Overview ===
Competition	First match	Last match	Starting round	Final position	Record							
Competition	First match	Last match	Starting round	Final position	Pld	W	D	L	GF	GA	GD	Win %
Süper Lig	11 September 2020	16 May 2021	Matchday 1		27	7	5	15	31	45	−14	25.93
Turkish Cup	3 November 2020		Third round	Third round	1	0	0	1	1	2	−1	0.00
Total					28	7	5	16	32	47	−15	25.00

Last updated: 7 March 2021
Source: Competitions

=== Süper Lig ===
==== League table ====
Pos	Team	Pld	W	D	L	GF	GA	GD	Pts	Qualification or relegation
17	Kayserispor	40	9	14	17	35	52	−17	41	
18	BB Erzurumspor (R)	40	10	10	20	44	68	−24	40	Relegation to TFF First League
19	Ankaragücü (R)	40	10	8	22	46	65	−19	38	Relegation to TFF First League
20	Gençlerbirliği (R)	40	10	8	22	44	76	−32	38	Relegation to TFF First League
21	Denizlispor (R)	40	6	10	24	38	77	−39	28	Relegation to TFF First League

Source: Süper Lig, Soccerway
Rules for classification: 1) Points; 2) Head-to-head points; 3) Head-to-head goal difference; 4) Head-to-head goals scored; 5) Goal difference; 6) Goals scored; 7) Play-off.
(R) Relegated

==== Results summary ====
Overall								Home						Away					
Pld	W	D	L	GF	GA	GD	Pts	W	D	L	GF	GA	GD	W	D	L	GF	GA	GD
27	7	5	15	31	45	−14	26	5	2	6	18	19	−1	2	3	9	13	26	−13

Last updated: 7 March 2021.
Source: Süper Lig

==== Results by round ====
Round	1	2	3	4	5	6	7	8	9	10	11	12	13	14	15	16	17	18	19	20	21	22	23	24	25	26	27	28	29	30	31	32	33	34	35	36	37	38	39	40	41	42
Ground	H	B	A	H	A	H	A	H	A	H	A	H	A	H	A	H	A	H	A	H	A	A	B	H	A	H	A	H	A	H	A	H	A	H	A	H	A	H	A	H	A	H
Result	L	B	D	L	L	W	L	D	L	L	L	W	D	L	W	W	L	L	L	W	L	L	B	L	D	D	L	W	W													
Position	13	19	16	20	21	20	21	19	19	20	21	20	19	20	18	18	18	19	20	19	19	20	20	20	20	20	21	19	18													

Updated to match(es) played on 7 March 2021. Source: Süper Lig
A = Away; H = Home; B = Bye; W = Win; D = Draw; L = Loss

Note: Since the league has been expanded to 21 teams each team will earn a bye twice this season.

==== Matches ====
13 September 2020 1	Ankaragücü	1–2	BB Erzurumspor	Ankara
17:00 TRT (UTC+3)	Bolingi 61'	Report	Karakullukçu 75', 79'	Stadium: Eryaman Stadium; Attendance: 0 Referee: Burak Şeker

2	BYE

27 September 2020 3	Sivasspor	0–0	Ankaragücü	Sivas
16:00 TRT (UTC+3)	Yeşilyurt (yellow card) 53'	Report	Adžić (yellow card) 59'; Pazdan (yellow card) 90+3'	Stadium: New Sivas 4 Eylül Stadium; Attendance: 0 Referee: Arda Kardeşler

2 October 2020 4	Ankaragücü	0–1	Kayserispor	Ankara
20:00		Report	Parlak 42'	Stadium: Eryaman Stadium; Attendance: 0 Referee: Bahattin Şimşek; Fourth official: Caner Ak

17 October 2020 5	Çaykur Rizespor	5–3	Ankaragücü	Rize
13:30 TRT (UTC+3)	Fernando 19'; Fernando Boldrin 45+1'; Loïc Rémy 55' (pen.), 62' (pen.), 78'	Report	Paintsil 6', 16'; Børven 43' (yellow card) 81'; Potuk (yellow card) 38' (yellow-red card) 45+3'	Stadium: Yeni Rize Şehir Stadium; Attendance: 0 Referee: Abdulkadir Bitigen

31 October 2020 7	Galatasaray	1–0	Ankaragücü	Istanbul
19:00 TRT (UTC+3)	Babel 45'; Emre (yellow card) 90'	Report		Stadium: Türk Telekom Stadium; Attendance: 0 Referee: Ali Şansalan

8 November 2020 8	Ankaragücü	2–2	Fatih Karagümrük	Ankara
13:30	Børven 27' (pen.); Güral 90'	Report	Sobiech 15'; Roco 35'	Stadium: Eryaman Stadium; Attendance: 0 Referee: Suat Arslanboga; Fourth official: Ramazan Keleş

27 November 2020 10	Ankaragücü	0–1	Trabzonspor	Ankara
19:30	Zvonimir Šarlija (yellow card) 5'; Stelios Kitsiou (yellow card) 21'	Report	Lewis Baker 45+1'; João Pereira (yellow card) 71' (yellow-red card) 90'; Uğurcan Çakır (yellow card) 81'; Djaniny (yellow card) 90+3'	Stadium: Eryaman Stadium; Attendance: 0 Referee: Mustafa Öğretmenoğlyu; Assistant referees: Mustafa Emre Eyisoy, Murat Ergin Gözütok; Fourth official: Caner Ak

6 December 2020 11	Antalyaspor	1–0	Ankaragücü	Antalya
16:00 TRT (UTC+3)	Bayrakdar (yellow card) 42'; Podolski (yellow card) 45'; Jahović 45+4'; Amilton (yellow card) 51'	Report	(yellow card) 22' Potuk; (yellow card) 28' Kitsiou	Stadium: Antalya Stadium; Attendance: 0 Referee: Halil Umut Meler

12 December 2020 12	Ankaragücü	4–3	Konyaspor	Ankara
19:00 TRT	Lobzhanidze 15'; Dioussé (yellow card) 20'; Bolingi (yellow card) 29' (yellow-red card) 90+6'; Børven 48'; Paintsil 78'; Güral 89' (pen.) (yellow card) 90'; Aygören (yellow card) 90+1'	Report	Demirok (yellow card) 21' (goal) 29' (pen.); Milošević 38'; Jevtović (yellow card) 39'; Skubic 69'; Demirbağ (yellow card) 88'	Stadium: Eryaman Stadium; Attendance: 0 Referee: Mete Kalkavan

15 December 2020 6	Ankaragücü	2–0	Hatayspor	Ankara
16:00 TRT (UTC+3)	Šarlija 69'; Paintsil 89'	Report	Karadeniz (red card) 50'	Stadium: Eryaman Stadium; Attendance: 0 Referee: Hüseyin Göçek
Note: Match was postponed due to COVID-19.

20 December 2020 13	Gençlerbirliği	1–1	Ankaragücü	Ankara
13:30 TRT (UTC+3)	Özdemir 58'; Altıparmak (red card) 90+6'	Report	Lobzhanidze 74'	Stadium: Eryaman Stadium; Attendance: 0 Referee: Yaşar Kemal Uğurlu

24 December 2020 14	Ankaragücü	0–1	Beşiktaş	Ankara
19:00 TRT (UTC+3)	Çetin (yellow card) 85'	Report	Vida 61'	Stadium: Eryaman Stadium; Attendance: 0 Referee: Halis Özkahya

27 December 2020 15	Denizlispor	1–2	Ankaragücü	Denizli
16:00	Hugo Rodallega (yellow card) 37'; Özer Özdemir (yellow card) 71'; Recep Niyaz 80'	Report	(yellow card) 2' (goal) 21' Atakan Çankaya; 45' Daniel Łukasik; (yellow card) 63' Joseph Paintsil; (yellow card) 90+6' Jonathan Bolingi	Stadium: Atatürk Stadium; Attendance: 0 Referee: Özgür Yankaya; Assistant referees: Esat Sancaktar, Candaş Elbil; Fourth official: Atilla Karaoğlan

2 January 2021 16	Ankaragücü	3–1	Yeni Malatyaspor	Ankara
16:00	Łukasik 4'; Paintsil 37' (pen.); Børven 88'	Report	Ndayishimiye 76'; Hafez (red card) 83'	Stadium: Eryaman Stadium; Attendance: 0 Referee: Volkan Bayarslan; Fourth official: Mustafa Kürşad Filiz

10 January 2021 18	Ankaragücü	1–2	İstanbul Başakşehir	Ankara
16:00 TRT (UTC+3)	Çekiçi 20'	Report	Višća 17'; Ba 56'	Stadium: Eryaman Stadium; Attendance: 0 Referee: Tugay Kaan Numanoglu

18 January 2021 19	Fenerbahçe	3–1	Ankaragücü	Istanbul
19:00	Mame Thiam 28' (yellow card) 45'; Mbwana Samatta 34'; Ozan Tufan (yellow card) 41'; Enner Valencia 67'	Report	(yellow card) 45' Endri Çekiçi; 90' Emre Güral	Stadium: Şükrü Saracoğlu Stadium; Attendance: 0 Referee: Arda Kardeşler; Assistant referees: Ali Saygın Ögel, Erdem Bayık; Fourth official: Kutluhan Bilgiç

21 January 2021 20	Ankaragücü	1–0	Kasımpaşa	Ankara
19:00	Hadergjonaj 16' (o.g.); Çekiçi (yellow card) 45+3'; Çankaya (yellow card) 53'; Pinto (yellow card) 71'; Çelikay (yellow card) 90+1'; Güral (yellow card) 90+6'	Report	Kara (yellow card) 24'; Hodžić (yellow card) 32'; Břečka (yellow card) 36'; Erdoğan (yellow card) 44'; Sadiku (yellow card) 80'	Stadium: Eryaman Stadium; Attendance: 0 Referee: Sarper Baris Saka; Fourth official: Çağdaş Altay

25 January 2021 21	Alanyaspor	4–3	Ankaragücü	Alanya
19:00	Uçan 37'; Bakasetas 54'; Babacar 62'; Moubandje 79'	Report	Paintsil 3', 28'; Aksoy 65' (o.g.)	Stadium: Bahçeşehir Okulları Stadium; Attendance: 0 Referee: Cüneyt Çakιr

23	BYE

7 February 2021 24	Ankaragücü	1–4	Sivasspor	Ankara
16:00 TRT (UTC+3)	Akdağ (yellow card) 20'; Kitsiou (yellow card) 55'; Badji (yellow card) 60'; Oğuz 66' (o.g.); Cetin (yellow card) 71'	Report	Gradel 9' (pen.); Kayode 48'; Yeşilyurt (yellow card) 58' (goal) 69'; Yatabaré 86'	Stadium: Eryaman Stadium; Attendance: 0 Referee: Burak Şeker

27 February 2021 27	Hatayspor	4–1	Ankaragücü	Antakya
13:30 TRT (UTC+3)		Report		Stadium: Hatay New Stadium; Attendance: 0 Referee: Atilla Karaoğlan

3 March 2021 28	Ankaragücü	2–1	Galatasaray	Ankara
19:00 TRT	Atila (yellow card) 27'; Šarlija (yellow card) 36'; Lobzhanidze 55', (yellow card) 64'; İbrahim 45+1', (yellow card) 71'; Kitsiou (yellow card) 90+1'	Report	Yedlin (yellow card) 33'; Mohamed (red card) 57'; Etebo (yellow card) 64'; Marcão (yellow card) 77'; Babel (yellow card) 90+2'; Kerem 90+2'	Stadium: Eryaman Stadium; Attendance: 0 Referee: Halil Umut Meler

7 March 2021 29	Fatih Karagümrük	0–1	Ankaragücü	Istanbul
13:30		Report	Potuk 54'	Stadium: Atatürk Olympic Stadium; Attendance: 0 Referee: Halis Özkahya

4 April 2021 32	Ankaragücü	v	Antalyaspor	Ankara
16:00 TRT (UTC+3)		Report		Stadium: Eryaman Stadium; Attendance: 0

36	Ankaragücü	v	Denizlispor	Ankara
		Report		Stadium: Eryaman Stadium

40	Ankaragücü	v	Fenerbahçe	Ankara
	1	Report	2	Stadium: Eryaman Stadium

=== Turkish Cup ===
3 November 2020 Third round	Ankaragücü	1–2	Kocaelispor	Ankara
20:30	Bolingi 74'	Report	Yiğit 51'; Karakaş 90+5'	Stadium: Eryaman Stadium; Referee: Çağdaş Altay
