= Arik (disambiguation) =

Arik is a given name and a surname.

Arik may also refer to:

- Arık, Kargı, village in Turkey
- Arik Air, Nigerian airline

== Surname ==
- Rabbi Meir Arik (1855–1925), Galician Torah scholar
- Engin Arık (October 14, 1948 – November 30, 2007) was a Turkish particle physicist
- Ahmet Can Arık (born 22 August 1997) is a Turkish footballer

== See also ==
- Arike (disambiguation)
