= Topuz =

Topuz is a Turkish surname. Notable people with the surname include:

- Ali Topuz (1932–2019), Turkish politician
- Fatma Aliye Topuz (1862–1936), Turkish novelist
- Hıfzı Topuz (1923–2023) Turkish journalist and novelist
- Mehmet Topuz (born 1983), Turkish footballer
- Mert Topuz (born 2001), Turkish footballer
- Rabia Topuz (born 2000), Turkish female boxer
- Seyhun Topuz (born 1942), Turkish sculptor
- Yakup Topuz (born 1954), Turkish wrestler

== See also ==
- Topuz, Sungurlu
