= Cebrail =

Cebrail is a given name used in various cultures and is a variant of the name Gabriel, one of the most revered angelic names. Derived from the Hebrew Gavri'el, it means “God is my strength” or “Strength of God.” The name conveys divine power, spiritual guidance, and the role of a heavenly messenger.

In religious and cultural traditions, Gabriel is celebrated as the archangel who delivers divine messages to humanity. Revered in Judaism, Christianity, and Islam, Gabriel embodies wisdom, protection, and sacred strength. The name evokes concepts such as divine strength, heavenly might, and the power of the Almighty, symbolizing fortitude and spiritual resilience.

The variant Cebrail is used across several cultures worldwide, preserving the profound symbolic heritage linked to the original name.

Notable people with the given name include:

- Cebrail Karayel (born 1994), Turkish footballer
- Cebrail Makreckis (born 2000), Latvian footballer

== See also ==
- Gabriel (given name)
- Cebrâil
