= Arike =

Arike may refer to:

- Arike (film), a 2012 Indian film
- Arike Ogunbowale (born 1997), American basketball player
- Heiki Arike (1965–2018), Estonian politician

== See also ==
- Arik (disambiguation)
- Arike (given name)
