= Stojan Vranješ =

Bosnian footballer (born 1986)

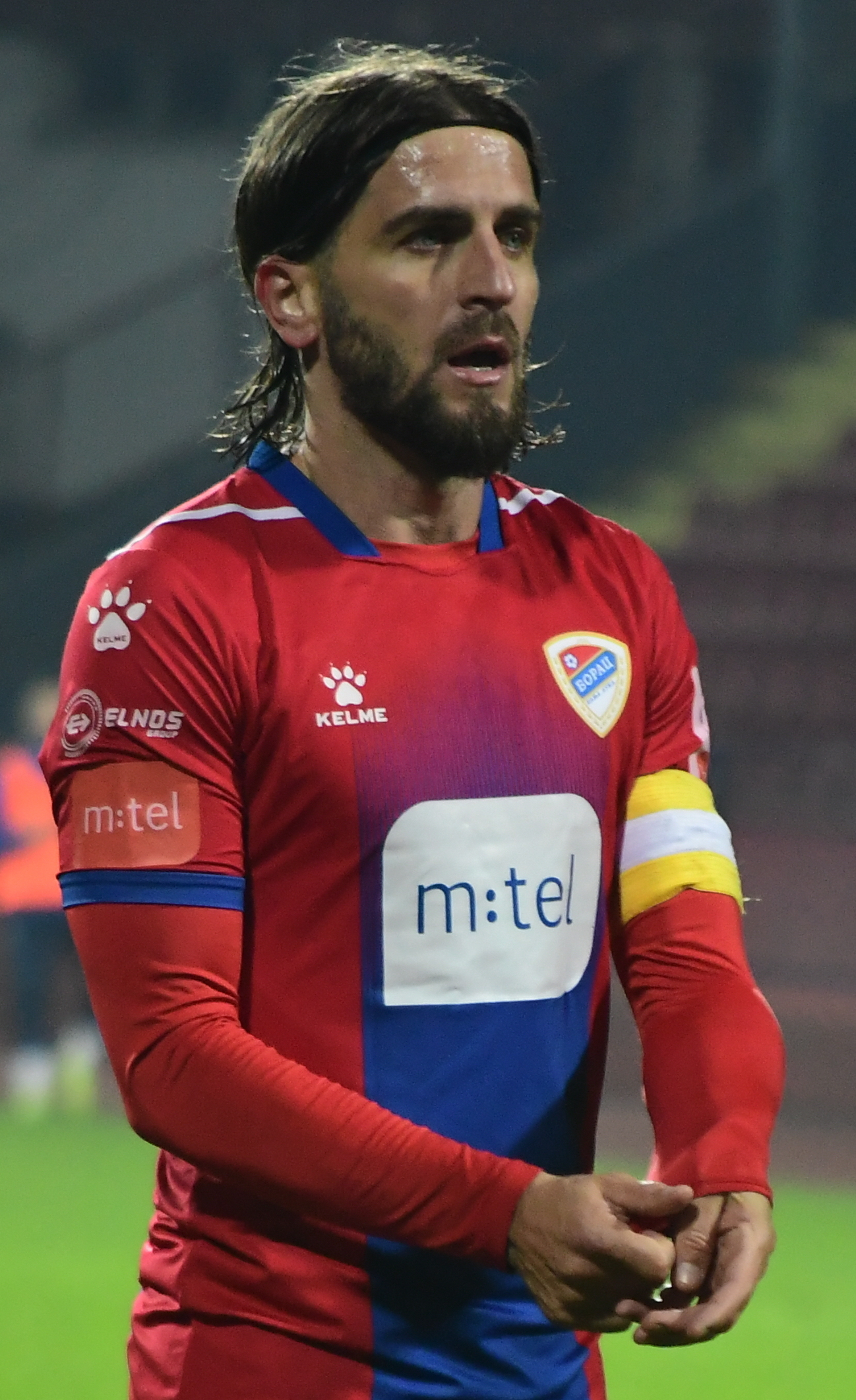
- Vranješ with Borac Banja Luka in 2020

Personal information
- Date of birth: 11 October 1986 (age 40)
- Place of birth: Banja Luka, SR Bosnia and Herzegovina, Yugoslavia
- Height: 1.83 m (6 ft 0 in)
- Positions: Attacking midfielder; forward

Team information
- Current team: Borac Banja Luka
- Number: 23

Youth career
- Borac Banja Luka
- Dugo Selo
- HAŠK

Senior career*
Years	Team	Apps	(Gls)
2005–2010	Borac Banja Luka	120	(30)
2010–2012	Pandurii	47	(11)
2012	→ CFR Cluj (loan)	10	(2)
2013–2014	Vojvodina	28	(5)
2014–2015	Lechia Gdańsk	52	(16)
2015–2016	Legia Warsaw	20	(2)
2016	Legia Warsaw II	8	(4)
2017–2018	Piast Gliwice	19	(1)
2018–2019	Željezničar	24	(3)
2019–2021	Borac Banja Luka	68	(38)
2021–2022	Bashundhara Kings	6	(2)
2022–2023	Sloboda Tuzla	21	(5)
2023–	Borac Banja Luka	62	(6)

International career
2002	Bosnia and Herzegovina U17	3	(0)
2007	Bosnia and Herzegovina U21	1	(0)
2009–2012	Bosnia and Herzegovina	3	(0)
- * Club domestic league appearances and goals as of 16 September 2026

Stojan Vranješ (Serbian Cyrillic: Стојан Врањеш; born 11 October 1986) is a Bosnian professional footballer who plays as a midfielder for Bosnian Premier League club Borac Banja Luka.

== Club career ==
=== Early career ===
Vranješ spent his youth career at his hometown club Borac Banja Luka, as well as Croatian clubs Dugo Selo and HAŠK. In 2005, he joined Borac's first team and stayed with the club for five seasons before moving to Romania, where he played for Pandurii and CFR Cluj.

=== Vojvodina ===
On 6 February 2013, Vranješ signed a two-year contract with Serbian giants Vojvodina. He scored his first goal for Vojvodina in a 2–1 win against Smederevo on 27 February 2013. He scored a goal from distance in a 3–0 win against Donji Srem on 19 March 2013, which Donji Srem manager Bogić Bogićević dubbed a "euro-goal".

=== Adventure in Poland ===
In February 2014, Vranješ was transferred from Vojvodina to Polish club Lechia Gdańsk for 200,000 Euros. After impressing at Lechia, scoring 16 goals in 52 appearances, he was transferred to Legia Warsaw on 29 August 2015. While at Legia, Vranješ won both the Ekstraklasa and Polish Cup in 2016. On 9 January 2017, shortly after leaving Legia, he signed a contract with Piast Gliwice. On 15 January 2018, Vranješ left the club after not having enough playing time in that season. Both sides said they are on good terms still to this day.

=== Željezničar ===
On 23 January 2018, Vranješ signed a one-and-a-half-year deal with Bosnian Premier League club Željezničar. On 9 May 2018, he won the Bosnian Cup after Željezničar beat Krupa in the two legged final of that season's cup. On 31 January 2019, Vranješ left Željezničar.

=== Return to Borac ===
On 1 February 2019, nine years after leaving the club, Vranješ once again became the new player of Borac in the First League of RS. He made his official debut for Borac on 27 February 2019, in a 2–1 away loss in a cup game against Široki Brijeg.

In the 2018–19 First League of RS season, Vranješ's Borac won the league title five games before the end of the season and got promoted back to the Bosnian Premier League. On 12 January 2020, he extended his contract with the club until the summer of 2023.

Vranješ won his first league title with Borac on 23 May 2021, one game before the end of the 2020–21 season, getting crowned Bosnian Premier League champions.

He terminated his contract with Borac and left the club in November 2021.

=== Bashundhara Kings ===
On 20 November 2021, Vranješ joined Bangladesh Premier League club Bashundhara Kings for the 2021–22 season.

== International career ==
Vranješ made his senior debut for Bosnia and Herzegovina on 1 June 2009, against Uzbekistan.

On 31 May 2012, Vranješ was at the center of a media storm for a mistake he made in a friendly match in Chicago against Mexico, which resulted in a last-minute goal for Mexico, who won 2–1.

== Personal life ==
Vranješ has a younger brother, Ognjen, who is also a professional footballer.

== Career statistics ==
=== Club ===
As of match played 16 September 2026

Appearances and goals by club, season and competition
Club	Season	League			National cup (Note: Includes Romanian Cup, Serbian Cup, Polish Cup, Bosnian Cup)		Continental		Other		Total	
Club	Season	Division	Apps	Goals	Apps	Goals	Apps	Goals	Apps	Goals	Apps	Goals
Borac Banja Luka	2005–06	First League of RS	10	2	—		—		—		10	2
Borac Banja Luka	2006–07	Bosnian Premier League	20	3	—		—		—		20	3
Borac Banja Luka	2007–08	First League of RS	26	9	—		—		—		26	9
Borac Banja Luka	2008–09	Bosnian Premier League	28	7	—		—		—		28	7
Borac Banja Luka	2009–10	Bosnian Premier League	14	5	—		—		—		14	5
Borac Banja Luka	Total		98	26	—		—		—		98	26
Pandurii	2009–10	Liga I	12	1	—		—		—		12	1
Pandurii	2010–11	Liga I	17	5	2	0	—		—		19	5
Pandurii	2011–12	Liga I	18	5	2	1	—		—		20	6
Pandurii	Total		47	11	4	1	—		—		51	12
CFR Cluj (loan)	2011–12	Liga I	10	2	—		—		—		10	2
Vojvodina	2012–13	Serbian SuperLiga	13	3	3	0	—		—		16	3
Vojvodina	2013–14	Serbian SuperLiga	15	2	3	0	8 (Note: Appearances in UEFA Europa League)	3	—		26	5
Vojvodina	Total		28	5	6	0	8	3	—		42	8
Lechia Gdańsk	2013–14	Ekstraklasa	14	7	2	0	—		—		16	7
Lechia Gdańsk	2014–15	Ekstraklasa	33	8	1	0	—		—		34	8
Lechia Gdańsk	2015–16	Ekstraklasa	5	1	—		—		—		5	1
Lechia Gdańsk	Total		52	16	3	0	—		—		55	16
Legia Warsaw	2015–16	Ekstraklasa	19	2	3	2	4	1	—		26	5
Legia Warsaw	2016–17	Ekstraklasa	1	0	—		—		1 (Note: Appearance in the Polish Super Cup)	0	2	0
Legia Warsaw	Total		20	2	3	2	4	1	1	0	28	5
Legia Warsaw II	2016–17	III liga	8	4	—		—		—		8	4
Piast Gliwice	2016–17	Ekstraklasa	10	0	—		—		—		10	0
Piast Gliwice	2017–18	Ekstraklasa	9	1	1	0	—		—		10	1
Piast Gliwice	Total		19	1	1	0	—		—		20	1
Željezničar	2017–18	Bosnian Premier League	12	2	3	0	—		—		15	2
Željezničar	2018–19	Bosnian Premier League	12	1	1	0	2	0	—		15	1
Željezničar	Total		24	3	4	0	2	0	—		30	3
Borac Banja Luka	2018–19	First League of RS	6	1	1	1	—		—		7	2
Borac Banja Luka	2019–20	Bosnian Premier League	22	12	2	2	—		—		24	14
Borac Banja Luka	2020–21	Bosnian Premier League	25	15	4	2	2	1	—		31	18
Borac Banja Luka	2021–22	Bosnian Premier League	15	10	—		4 (Note: Two appearances and one goal in UEFA Champions League, two appearances in UEFA Conference League)	1	—		19	11
Borac Banja Luka	Total		68	38	7	5	6	2	—		81	45
Bashundhara Kings	2021–22	Bangladesh Premier League	6	2	—		—		—		6	2
Sloboda Tuzla	2022–23	Bosnian Premier League	21	5	1	1	—		—		22	6
Borac Banja Luka	2023–24	Bosnian Premier League	20	3	8	1	1 (Note: Appearance in UEFA Conference League)	0	—		29	4
Borac Banja Luka	2024–25	Bosnian Premier League	26	3	5	1	13 (Note: Four appearances in UEFA Champions League, one appearance in UEFA Europa League, eight appearances in UEFA Conference League)	0	1 (Note: Appearance in the Bosnian Supercup)	0	45	4
Borac Banja Luka	2025–26	Bosnian Premier League	11	0	1	0	—		—		12	0
Borac Banja Luka	2026–27	Bosnian Premier League	5	0	0	0	1	0	—		6	0
Borac Banja Luka	Total		62	6	14	2	15	0	1	0	92	8
Career total			463	121	43	11	35	6	2	0	543	138

=== International ===
Appearances and goals by national team and year
National team	Year	Apps	Goals
Bosnia and Herzegovina	2009	1	0
Bosnia and Herzegovina	2012	2	0
Total		3	0

== Honours ==
Borac Banja Luka

- Bosnian Premier League: 2020–21, 2023–24, 2025–26
- First League of RS: 2018–19
- Bosnian Cup: 2009–10

CFR Cluj

- Liga I: 2011–12

Vojvodina

- Serbian Cup: 2013–14

Legia Warsaw

- Ekstraklasa: 2015–16
- Polish Cup: 2015–16

Željezničar

- Bosnian Cup: 2017–18
