= Alihan Kubalas =

Turkish footballer

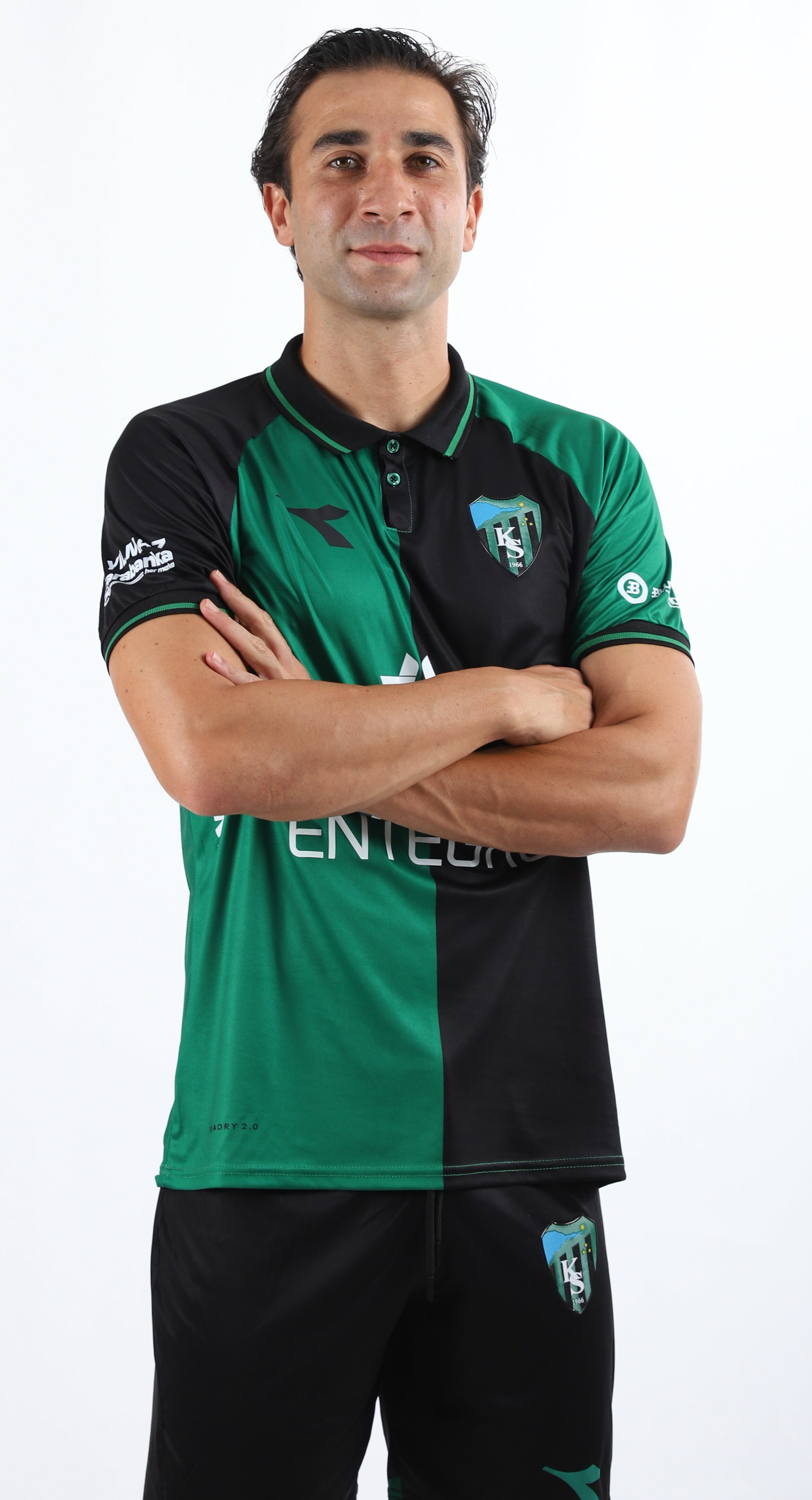

Personal information
- Date of birth: 26 October 1991 (age 35)
- Place of birth: Şişli, Turkey
- Height: 1.85 m (6 ft 1 in)
- Position: Midfielder

Team information
- Current team: Yeni Mersin İY
- Number: 5

Youth career
- 2004–2007: Maltepespor
- 2007–2009: Fenerbahçe
- 2009–2010: Bulvarspor

Senior career*
Years	Team	Apps	(Gls)
2010–2012	Bağcılar	60	(6)
2012–2013	Sivasspor	0	(0)
2012–2013	→ Tokatspor (loan)	25	(4)
2013–2014	Altay	26	(4)
2015	Karagümrük	1	(0)
2015–2016	İstanbulspor	32	(3)
2016–2020	Ankaragücü	76	(8)
2022–2023	Vanspor FK	14	(0)
2023–2024	Kocaelispor	17	(0)
2024	Ankara Keçiörengücü	5	(1)
2024–2025	Serik Belediyespor	29	(2)
2025–	Yeni Mersin İY	8	(0)
- * Club domestic league appearances and goals as of 9 November 2025

Alihan Kubalas (born 26 October 1991) is a Turkish professional footballer who plays as a midfielder for TFF 2. Lig club Yeni Mersin İY.

== Professional career ==
A youth product of various Istanbul based team, Kubalas spent his early career in the lower divisions of Turkish football before moving to Ankaragücü in 2016. Kubalas made his professional debut for in an Ankaragücü in a 2–1 Süper Lig loss to Kasımpaşa on 2 September 2018.
