= Sedat Ağçay =

Turkish footballer (born 1981)

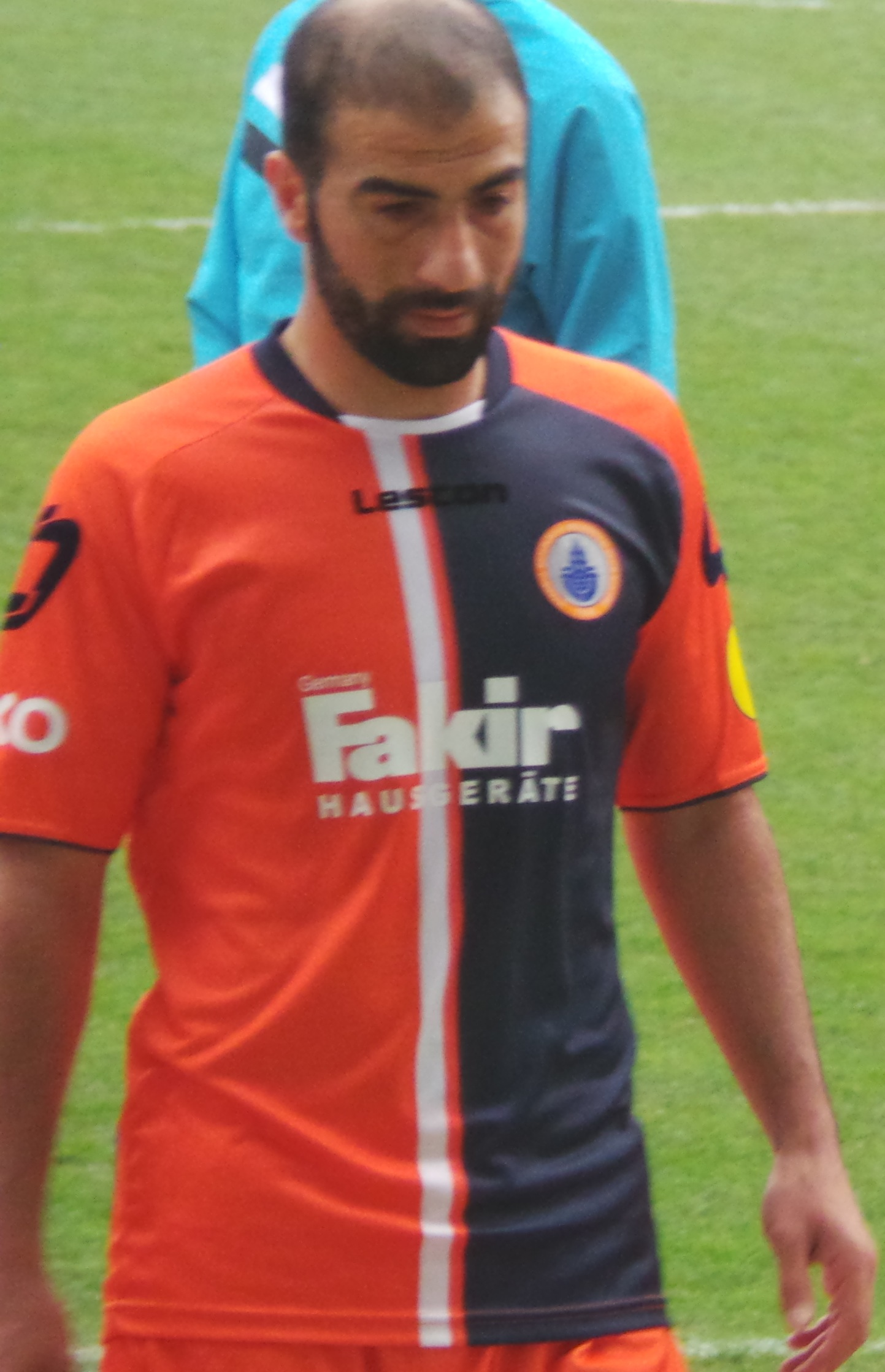

Personal information
- Full name: Sedat Ağçay
- Date of birth: 22 September 1981 (age 45)
- Place of birth: Bulanık, Muş
- Height: 1.76 m (5 ft 9 1/2 in)
- Position: Defensive midfielder

Senior career*
Years	Team	Apps	(Gls)
2003	Elazığspor	10	(1)
2004–2006	Gaziantepspor	65	(6)
2006–2008	Konyaspor	56	(3)
2008–2012	Antalyaspor	124	(1)
2012–2013	Adanaspor	28	(0)
2013–2014	Şanlıurfaspor	17	(0)
2014–2015	İstanbul Başakşehir	42	(1)
2016–2017	Yeni Malatyaspor	45	(3)
2017–2020	Ankaragücü	81	(2)

Managerial career
- 2022–2023: Ankaragücü (assistant)
- 2023: Ankaragücü
- 2024–2025: Pendikspor
- 2025: Keçiörengücü
- * Club domestic league appearances and goals

Sedat Ağçay (born 22 September 1981, Muş, Turkey) is a Turkish football coach and former professional footballer who was most recently the manager of TFF 1. Lig club Keçiörengücü.

== Career ==
He has played for Zeytinburnuspor, Yozgatspor, Elazigspor, Gaziantepspor, Konyaspor and Antalyaspor.

== Managerial statistics ==
As of match played 19 March 2023

Managerial record by team and tenure
Team	From	To	Record							
Team	From	To	G	W	D	L	GF	GA	GD	Win %
Ankaragücü	21 February 2023	23 March 2023	3	1	0	2	3	4	−1	33.33
Pendikspor	18 October 2024	Present	1	0	1	0	0	0	+0	0.00
Career total			4	1	1	2	3	4	−1	25.00
