= Krystian Żołnierewicz =

Polish footballer

Personal information
- Full name: Krystian Żołnierewicz
- Date of birth: 21 April 1993 (age 33)
- Place of birth: Elbląg, Poland
- Height: 1.90 m (6 ft 3 in)
- Position: Defender

Team information
- Current team: Salos Rumia
- Number: 12

Youth career
- 2006: UKS Cisowa
- 2007–2009: Arka Gdynia

Senior career*
Years	Team	Apps	(Gls)
2009–2013	Arka Gdynia (ME)	23	(2)
2010–2013	Arka Gdynia	4	(0)
2013	Arka Gdynia II	3	(2)
2019–2022	Wietcisa Skarszewy	59	(19)
2025–	Salos Rumia	3	(0)

International career
2010	Poland U18	1	(0)
- * Club domestic league appearances and goals as of 10:16, 21 February 2026 (UTC)

Krystian Żołnierewicz (born 21 April 1993) is a Polish semi-professional footballer who plays as a defender for regional league club Salos Rumia.

== Career ==
Żołnierewicz was a top prospect for Arka Gdynia, making his professional debut in the Ekstraklasa at age 17. However, he spent more of his time playing for the reserve team, and the club released him in June 2013 after making only four appearances in the top tier.
