= Paweł Czoska =

Polish footballer

Personal information
- Full name: Paweł Czoska
- Date of birth: 31 August 1990 (age 36)
- Place of birth: Wejherowo, Poland
- Height: 1.81 m (5 ft 11 1/2 in)
- Position: Midfielder

Youth career
- Gryf Wejherowo
- Arka Gdynia

Senior career*
Years	Team	Apps	(Gls)
2007	Arka Gdynia II		
2008–2013	Arka Gdynia (ME)	63	(6)
2008–2013	Arka Gdynia	26	(1)
2012	→ Olimpia Elbląg (loan)	11	(0)
2013	Warta Poznań	11	(0)
2013	Radomiak Radom	14	(1)
2015–2016	Gryf Wejherowo	31	(2)
2016–2017	GKS Przodkowo	41	(4)
2017–2020	GOSRiT Luzino		

International career
2011	Poland U21	2	(0)
- * Club domestic league appearances and goals

Paweł Czoska (born 31 August 1990) is a Polish former professional footballer who played as a midfielder.

== Honours ==
Gryf Wejherowo

- III liga Pomerania–West Pomerania: 2014–15
