= Arik =

Arik is a given name and may refer to:

- Arik Ascherman (born 1959), American-born Reform rabbi and Palestinian human rights activist in Israel
- Arik Brauer (1929–2021), Austrian visionary artist
- Arik Benado (born 1973), Israeli football manager and former player
- Arik Einstein (1939–2013), Israeli singer
- Arik Levy, Industrial designer and contemporary artist
- Arik Gilbert (born 2002), American football player
- Ariel "Arik" Ze'evi (born 1977), Israeli judoka
- Arik Marshall (born 1967), American musician
- Artoces (fl. 78–63 BC), a.k.a. Arik, an ancient Georgian ruler

== Fictional characters ==
- Arik Soong, fictional geneticist and later cyberneticist
