= Michał Pazdan =

Polish footballer (born 1987)

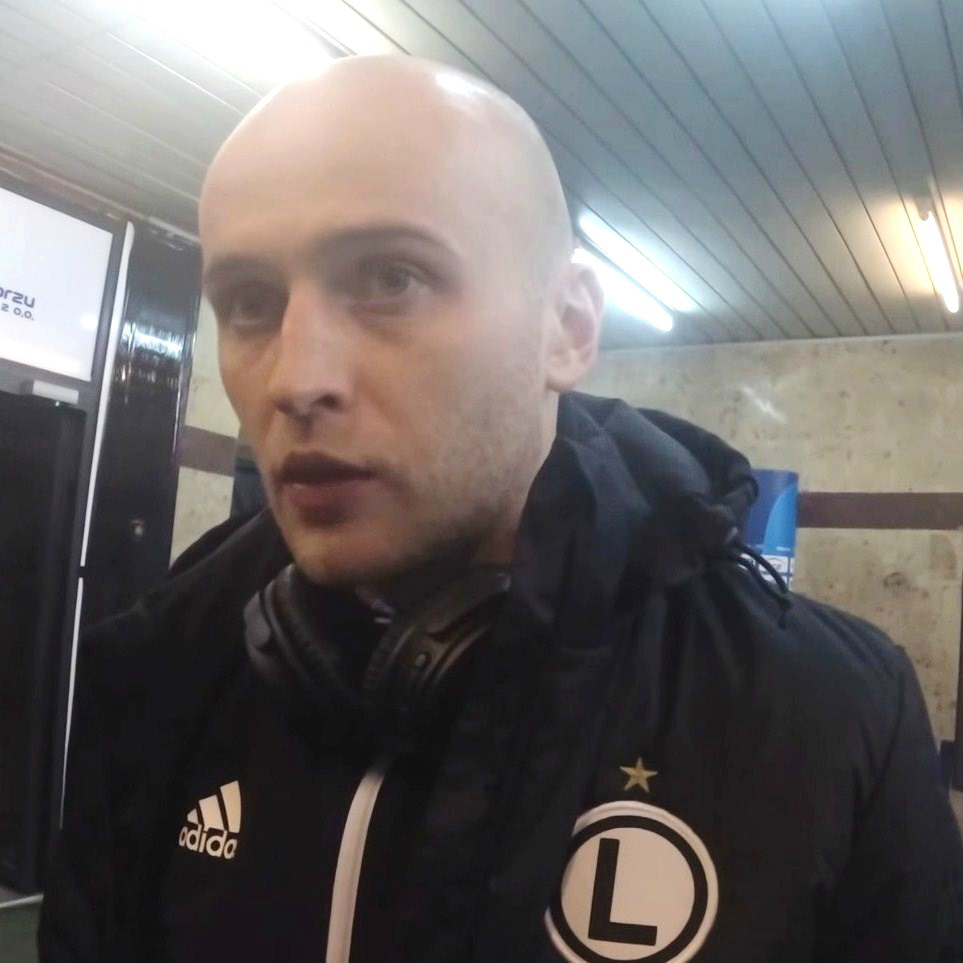
- Pazdan with Legia Warsaw in 2018

Personal information
- Full name: Michał Pazdan
- Date of birth: 21 September 1987 (age 39)
- Place of birth: Kraków, Poland
- Height: 1.81 m (5 ft 11 in)
- Position: Centre-back

Youth career
- 2002–2004: Hutnik Kraków

Senior career*
Years	Team	Apps	(Gls)
2004–2007	Hutnik Kraków		
2007–2012	Górnik Zabrze	126	(3)
2012–2015	Jagiellonia Białystok	86	(3)
2015–2019	Legia Warsaw	83	(0)
2019–2021	Ankaragücü	60	(2)
2021–2023	Jagiellonia Białystok	41	(1)
2023–2026	Wieczysta Kraków	85	(6)

International career
2007–2019	Poland	38	(0)
- * Club domestic league appearances and goals as of 21:38, 31 May 2026 (UTC)

Michał Pazdan (Polish pronunciation: [ˈmixaw ˈpazdan], born 21 September 1987) is a Polish professional footballer who plays as a centre-back.

== Club career ==
Pazdan began his football career at Hutnik Kraków. He gradually made his way up the ranks and became part of the first team squad in the 2003–04 season.

In 2007, Pazdan joined Górnik Zabrze and made his Ekstraklasa debut on 14 September 2007 with Jagiellonia Białystok against Polonia Bytom. During that season, he made 19 appearances for the club, 17 of those as a starter, with the team finishing in eighth place.

On 24 June 2015, Pazdan joined Legia Warsaw. He later signed a two-year contract with Ankaragücü on 29 January 2019.

== International career ==
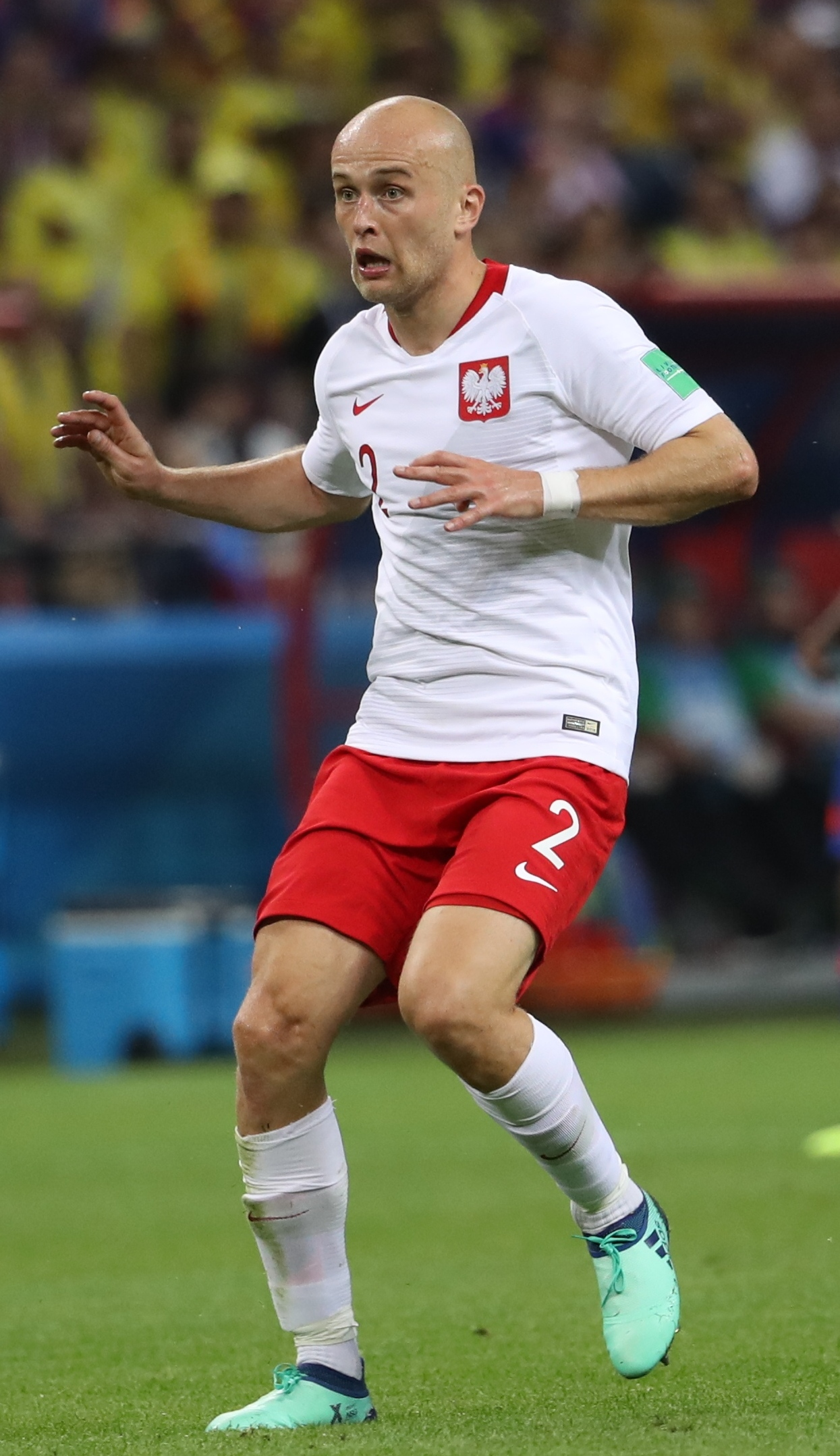
Pazdan with Poland at the 2018 FIFA World Cup

Pazdan earned 35 caps for the Poland national team, making his debut on 15 December 2007 in a 1–0 friendly victory against Bosnia and Herzegovina. He was later included in the Polish squad for UEFA Euro 2008 but did not play in the tournament.

During Euro 2016, Pazdan became a national hero after the game against World Champions, Germany, where he was pronounced as Man of the match and led the team to a draw, which helped Poland to qualify for the knockout stages of the tournament for the first time in history. His performances also led to reported interest from Premier League clubs. Poland beat Switzerland on penalties to qualify for the quarter-finals, but the defenders conceded their first goal of the tournament to Xherdan Shaqiri.

In June 2018, he was named in Poland's squad for the 2018 FIFA World Cup in Russia.

== Career statistics ==
=== Club ===
As of match played 31 May 2026

Appearances and goals by club, season and competition
Club	Season	League			National cup (Note: Includes Polish Cup)		Europe		Other		Total	
Club	Season	Division	Apps	Goals	Apps	Goals	Apps	Goals	Apps	Goals	Apps	Goals
Górnik Zabrze	2007–08	Ekstraklasa	19	0	0	0	—		9 (Note: Appearances in Ekstraklasa Cup)	0	28	0
Górnik Zabrze	2008–09	Ekstraklasa	29	0	2	0	—		2	0	33	0
Górnik Zabrze	2009–10	I liga	33	2	0	0	—		—		33	2
Górnik Zabrze	2010–11	Ekstraklasa	17	0	0	0	—		—		17	0
Górnik Zabrze	2011–12	Ekstraklasa	28	1	2	0	—		—		30	1
Górnik Zabrze	Total		126	3	4	0	—		11	0	141	3
Jagiellonia Białystok	2012–13	Ekstraklasa	27	1	3	0	—		—		30	1
Jagiellonia Białystok	2013–14	Ekstraklasa	32	0	5	0	—		—		37	0
Jagiellonia Białystok	2014–15	Ekstraklasa	27	2	2	0	—		—		29	2
Jagiellonia Białystok	Total		86	3	10	0	—		—		96	3
Legia Warsaw	2015–16	Ekstraklasa	24	0	4	0	10 (Note: Appearances in UEFA Europa League)	0	1 (Note: Appearance in Polish Super Cup)	0	39	0
Legia Warsaw	2016–17	Ekstraklasa	28	0	0	0	10 (Note: Eight appearances in UEFA Champions League, two appearances in UEFA Europa League)	0	0	0	38	0
Legia Warsaw	2017–18	Ekstraklasa	29	0	3	0	5 (Note: Three appearances in UEFA Champions League, two appearances in UEFA Europa League)	0	1	0	38	0
Legia Warsaw	2018–19	Ekstraklasa	2	0	2	1	3 (Note: One appearance in UEFA Champions League, two appearances in UEFA Europa League)	0	0	0	7	1
Legia Warsaw	Total		83	0	9	1	28	0	2	0	122	1
Ankaragücü	2018–19	Süper Lig	14	2	0	0	—		—		14	2
Ankaragücü	2019–20	Süper Lig	31	0	0	0	—		—		31	0
Ankaragücü	2020–21	Süper Lig	15	0	0	0	—		—		15	0
Ankaragücü	Total		60	2	0	0	—		—		60	2
Jagiellonia Białystok	2021–22	Ekstraklasa	27	0	1	0	—		—		28	0
Jagiellonia Białystok	2022–23	Ekstraklasa	14	1	1	0	—		—		15	1
Jagiellonia Białystok	Total		41	1	2	0	—		—		43	1
Wieczysta Kraków	2023–24	III liga, gr. IV	26	2	0	0	—		—		26	2
Wieczysta Kraków	2024–25	II liga	27	2	—		—		2 (Note: Appearances in II liga promotion play-offs)	1	29	3
Wieczysta Kraków	2025–26	I liga	28	1	0	0	—		2 (Note: Appearances in I liga promotion play-offs)	0	30	1
Wieczysta Kraków	Total		81	5	0	0	—		4	1	85	6
Career total			477	14	25	1	28	0	17	1	547	16

=== International ===
Appearances and goals by national team and year
National team	Year	Apps	Goals
Poland	2007	1	0
Poland	2008	4	0
Poland	2013	2	0
Poland	2014	2	0
Poland	2015	5	0
Poland	2016	10	0
Poland	2017	6	0
Poland	2018	5	0
Poland	2019	3	0
Total		38	0

== Honours ==
Legia Warsaw

- Ekstraklasa: 2015–16, 2016–17, 2017–18
- Polish Cup: 2015–16, 2017–18

Wieczysta Kraków

- III liga, group IV: 2023–24

Individual

- Ekstraklasa Player of the Year: 2016
- Ekstraklasa Defender of the Season: 2014–15
- Polish Footballers' Union's Ekstraklasa XI: 2016
- FIFA San Miguel Cup Team of the Tournament: 2009
- Polski Związek Piłki Nożnej Sony Cup runner-up
