= Emil Noll =

German-Congolese footballer (born 1978)

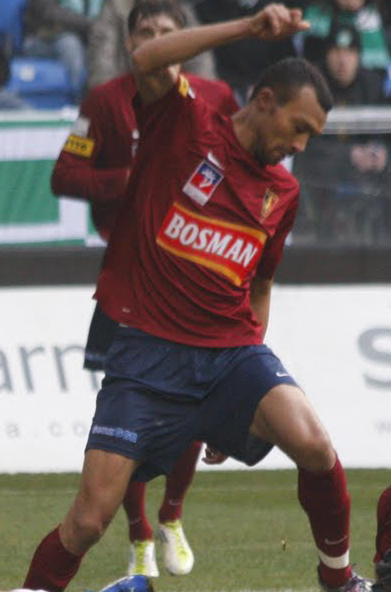
- Noll with Pogoń Szczecin

Personal information
- Date of birth: 21 November 1978 (age 47)
- Place of birth: Kinshasa, Zaire
- Height: 1.94 m (6 ft 4 in)
- Position: Centre-back

Youth career
- SV Aufheim
- TSV Albeck

Senior career*
Years	Team	Apps	(Gls)
1997–1999	TSV Neu-Ulm		
1999–2002	FV Illertissen		
2002–2004	VfR Aalen	47	(5)
2004–2006	Alemannia Aachen	53	(5)
2007	TuS Koblenz	11	(0)
2007–2008	SC Paderborn	14	(0)
2008–2009	FSV Frankfurt	14	(1)
2009–2010	FC Vaduz	17	(2)
2010–2011	Arka Gdynia	29	(3)
2011–2013	Pogoń Szczecin	47	(3)
2012	Pogoń Szczecin II	1	(0)
2013–2016	FC Homburg	67	(6)
2016–2017	FV Ravensburg		
- * Club domestic league appearances and goals

Emil Noll (born 21 November 1978) is a German-Congolese former professional footballer who played as a centre-back.

== Career ==
Noll was born in Kinshasa, Zaire. He played in the Bundesliga and the UEFA Cup with Alemannia Aachen. In April 2009, was linked with a transfer to Leeds United and Sheffield Wednesday.

In August 2010, he joined Arka Gdynia on a two-year contract. He was released by Arka Gdynia on 30 June 2011.

In August 2011, he joined Pogoń Szczecin.

== Personal life ==
Noll's father is German and his mother is Congolese, his family moved to Ulm, Germany when he was five years old.

== Honours ==
Vaduz

- Liechtenstein Cup: 2009–10
