= Mehmet Sak =

Turkish footballer

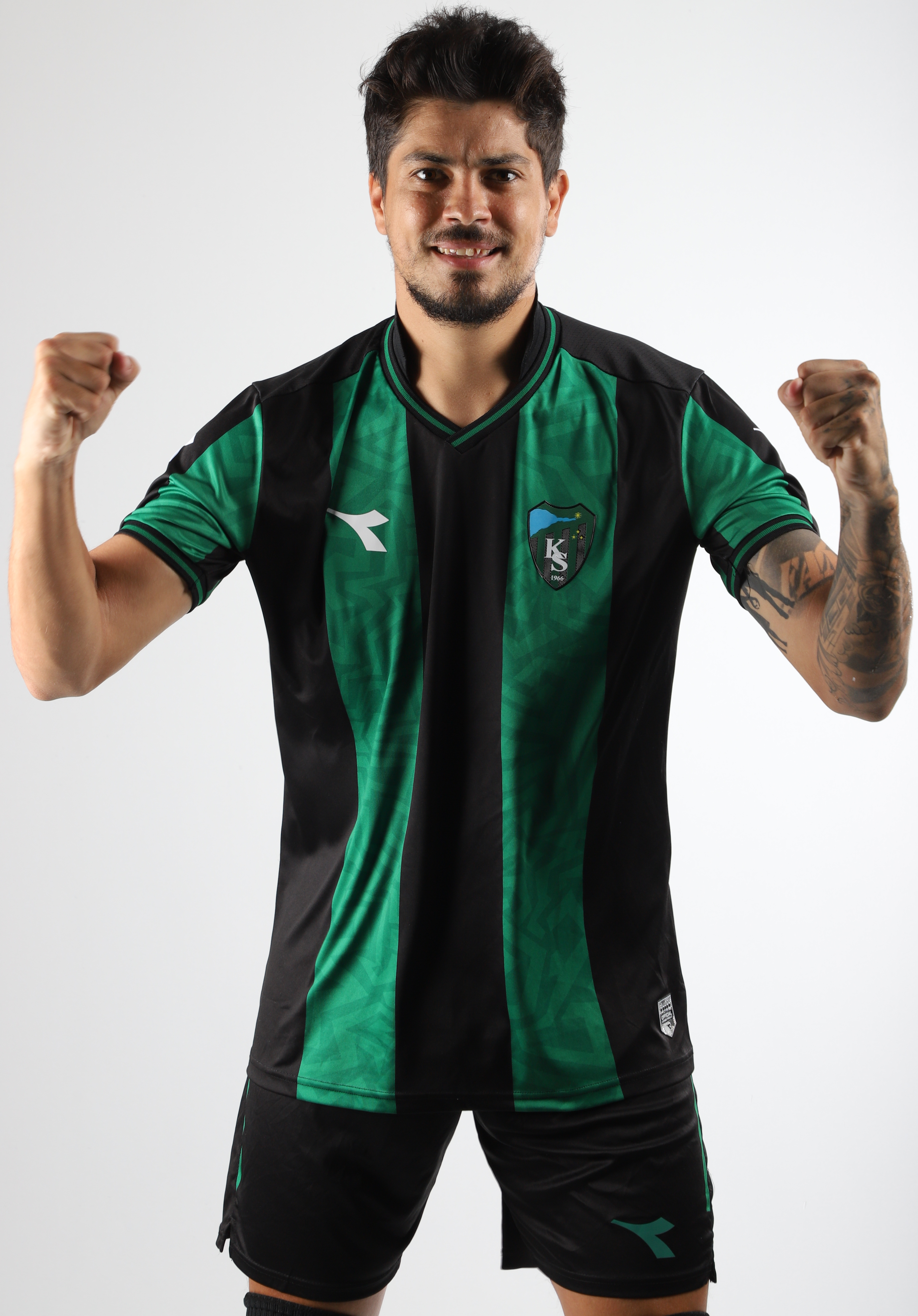

Personal information
- Date of birth: 4 April 1990 (age 36)
- Place of birth: Konak, İzmir, Turkey
- Height: 1.78 m (5 ft 10 in)
- Position: Left back

Youth career
- 2002–2006: Altay

Senior career*
| Years | Team | Apps | (Gls) |
| 2006–2011 | Altay | 24 | (0) |
| 2011–2013 | Bursaspor | 8 | (0) |
| 2012 | → Samsunspor (loan) | 1 | (0) |
| 2013 | → Göztepe (loan) | 6 | (0) |
| 2013–2014 | Bucaspor | 3 | (0) |
| 2014–2016 | Adanaspor | 47 | (2) |
| 2016–2017 | Yeni Malatyaspor | 12 | (0) |
| 2017–2020 | Ankaragücü | 40 | (0) |
| 2020–2022 | Hekimoğlu Trabzon | 34 | (0) |
| 2022 | Serik Belediyespor | 16 | (0) |
| 2022–2023 | Kocaelispor | 15 | (0) |
| 2023–2025 | Bucaspor 1928 | 46 | (7) |
| 2025 | Adana 01 FK | 0 | (0) |

International career
| 2008 | Turkey U18 | 3 | (0) |
- * Club domestic league appearances and goals as of 3 May 2025

Mehmet Sak (born 4 April 1990) is a Turkish professional footballer who plays as a midfielder.

== Club career ==
A native of İzmir, Sak began his career with local club Altay in 2006. He moved to Bursaspor in January 2011.

On 11 August 2012, he joined Samsunspor on a season-long loan.
