= Vlastimir Jovanović (footballer) =

Bosnian footballer (born 1985)

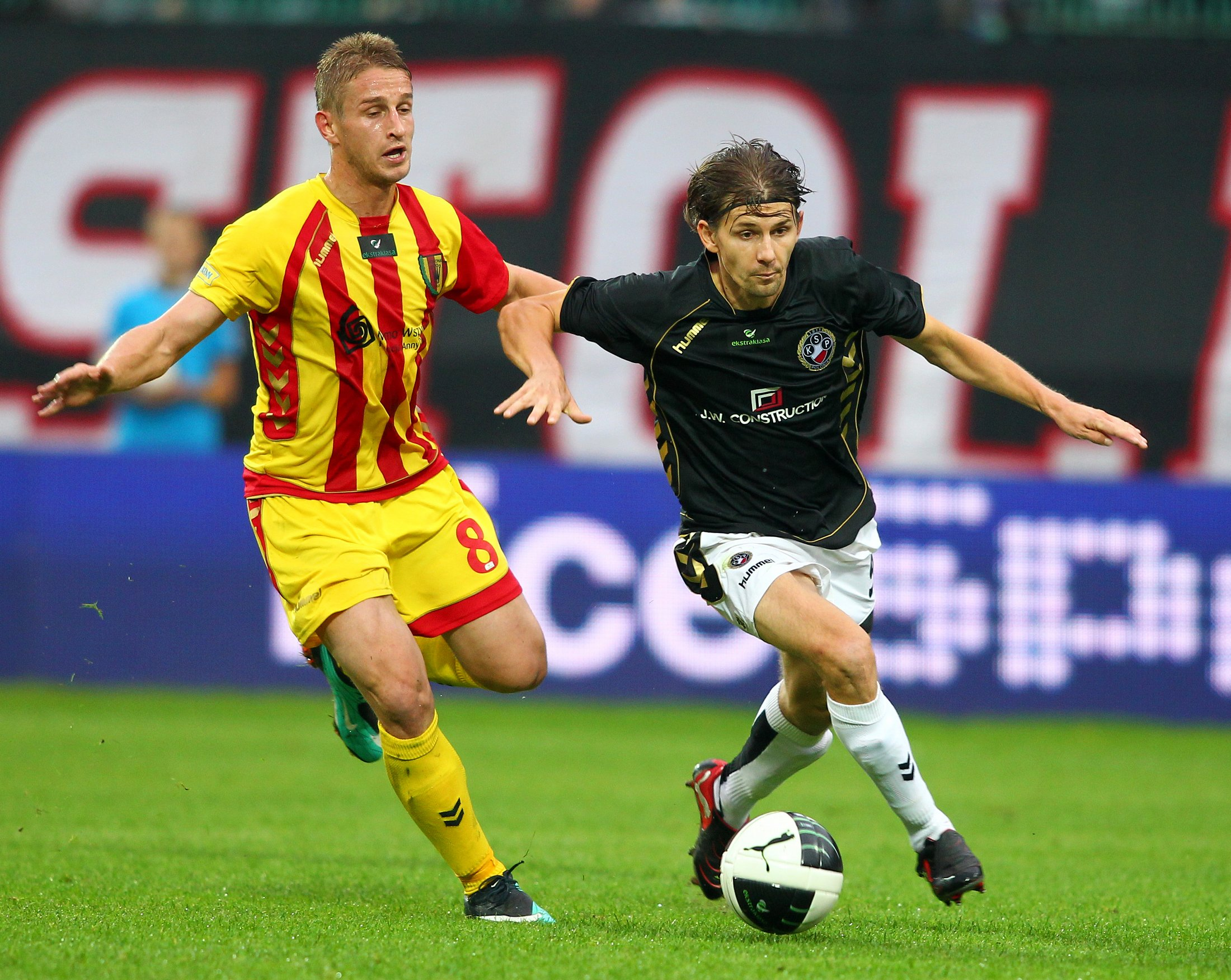

Personal information
- Date of birth: 3 April 1985 (age 41)
- Place of birth: Doboj, SFR Yugoslavia
- Height: 1.82 m (6 ft 0 in)
- Position: Defensive midfielder

Senior career*
Years	Team	Apps	(Gls)
2005–2006	Sloga Doboj		
2006–2009	Slavija Sarajevo	73	(4)
2009	Manisaspor	0	(0)
2009–2010	Slavija Sarajevo	18	(2)
2010–2016	Korona Kielce	176	(6)
2016–2024	Bruk-Bet Termalica	134	(7)
2020–2025	Bruk-Bet Termalica II	110	(41)

International career
2008–2009	Bosnia and Herzegovina	3	(0)
- * Club domestic league appearances and goals

Vlastimir Jovanović (Serbian Cyrillic: Властимир Јовановић; born 3 April 1985) is a Bosnian former professional footballer who played as a defensive midfielder.

== Club career ==
Jovanović signed a three-year contract with Turkish club Manisaspor in July 2009, before returning to Slavija Sarajevo shortly after.

On 22 July 2010, he signed a three-year contract with Ekstraklasa club Korona Kielce

== International career ==
He made his debut for Bosnia and Herzegovina in a January 2008 friendly match away against Japan and has earned a total of three caps, scoring no goals. His final international was a June 2009 friendly against Uzbekistan.

== Personal life ==
Since August 2017, Jovanović holds Polish citizenship.

== Honours ==
Bruk-Bet Termalica II

- IV liga Lesser Poland East: 2021–22
- Polish Cup (Żabno regionals): 2021–22, 2022–23, 2023–24, 2024–25
