= Alper Önal =

Turkish footballer

Personal information
- Full name: Alper Önal
- Date of birth: 6 June 1996 (age 30)
- Place of birth: Manisa, Turkey
- Height: 1.77 m (5 ft 10 in)
- Position: Forward

Team information
- Current team: Adıyamanspor (on loan from Ankaragücü)
- Number: 1

Youth career
- 2007–2008: Manisa FK
- 2008–2017: Manisaspor

Senior career*
Years	Team	Apps	(Gls)
2017–2018	Manisaspor	18	(1)
2019–	Ankaragücü	6	(0)
2018–2019	→ Fethiyespor (loan)	19	(2)
2020	→ Mamak FK (loan)	4	(1)
2020–	→ Adıyamanspor (loan)	8	(0)
- * Club domestic league appearances and goals as of 14:34, 26 December 2020 (UTC)

Alper Önal (born 6 June 1996) is a Turkish footballer who plays as a forward for Adıyamanspor on loan from Ankaragücü.

== Professional career ==
Önal made his professional debut with Ankaragücü in a 2-0 Süper Lig loss to Çaykur Rizespor on 25 October 2019.
