= Ahmet Can Arık =

Turkish footballer (born 1997)

Personal information
- Date of birth: 22 August 1997 (age 29)
- Place of birth: Sincan, Turkey
- Height: 1.77 m (5 ft 10 in)
- Position: Midfielder

Team information
- Current team: Pazarspor
- Number: 27

Youth career
- 2007–2017: Ankaragücü

Senior career*
| Years | Team | Apps | (Gls) |
| 2017–2020 | Ankaragücü | 2 | (0) |
| 2018–2019 | → Nevşehir Belediyespor (loan) | 20 | (1) |
| 2020 | → Çankaya FK (loan) | 1 | (0) |
| 2020–2021 | 68 Aksaray Belediyespor | 13 | (0) |
| 2021–2023 | 23 Elazığ FK | 74 | (12) |
| 2023– | Pazarspor | 3 | (0) |
- * Club domestic league appearances and goals as of 23 September 2023

Ahmet Can Arık (born 22 August 1997) is a Turkish footballer who plays as a midfielder for TFF Third League club Pazarspor.

== Professional career ==
Arık made his professional debut with Ankaragücü in a 2-0 Süper Lig loss to Çaykur Rizespor on 25 October 2019.
