= Ender Aygören =

Turkish footballer

Personal information
- Date of birth: 16 June 2000 (age 26)
- Place of birth: Uşak, Turkey
- Height: 1.76 m (5 ft 9 in)
- Position: Midfielder

Team information
- Current team: Manisaspor

Youth career
- 2011–2013: Barbarosspor
- 2013–2016: Kepezspor
- 2016–2019: Ankaragücü

Senior career*
Years	Team	Apps	(Gls)
2019–2023	Ankaragücü	5	(0)
2021–2022	→ Iğdır FK (loan)	8	(0)
2022	→ Alanya Kestelspor (loan)	5	(0)
2022	→ Ankara Demirspor (loan)	7	(0)
2023	→ Dıyarbakırspor (loan)	2	(0)
2023	Kırklarelispor	6	(1)
2023–	Manisaspor		
- * Club domestic league appearances and goals as of 20 May 2023

Ender Aygören (born 16 June 2000) is a Turkish footballer who plays as a midfielder for an amateur side Manisaspor.

== Professional career ==
Aygören made his debut with Ankaragücü in a 5-0 Süper Lig loss to Alanyaspor on 30 November 2019.

In 2021, he was loaned away to Iğdır FK.
