= Maciej Szmatiuk =

Polish footballer

Personal information
- Full name: Maciej Szmatiuk
- Date of birth: 9 May 1980 (age 46)
- Place of birth: Gliwice, Poland
- Height: 1.83 m (6 ft 0 in)
- Position: Defender

Team information
- Current team: Piast Gliwice II (assistant)

Senior career*
Years	Team	Apps	(Gls)
1999–2000	Sośnica Gliwice		
2000–2001	Górnik Zabrze	0	(0)
2001–2006	Piast Gliwice		
2006–2007	Koszarawa Żywiec		
2007–2009	Podbeskidzie Bielsko-Biała	66	(5)
2009–2011	Arka Gdynia	55	(6)
2011–2013	GKS Bełchatów	37	(2)
2013–2017	Górnik Łęczna	104	(6)
2018	Gwardia Koszalin	3	(0)

Managerial career
- 2020–: Piast Gliwice II (assistant)
- * Club domestic league appearances and goals

Maciej Szmatiuk (born 9 May 1980) is a Polish former professional footballer who is currently the assistant coach of Piast Gliwice II.

== Career ==
=== Club ===
In July 2007 he moved to Podbeskidzie Bielsko-Biała on a two-year contract from Koszarawa Żywiec. In summer 2009 he joined Arka Gdynia on a two-year contract.

In June 2011 he joined GKS Bełchatów on a two-year contract.
