= Mert Topuz =

Turkish footballer

Personal information
- Date of birth: 19 February 2001 (age 25)
- Place of birth: Yerköy, Turkey
- Height: 1.89 m (6 ft 2 in)
- Position: Goalkeeper

Team information
- Current team: Hacettepe 1945 SK

Youth career
- 2013–2020: Ankaragücü

Senior career*
Years	Team	Apps	(Gls)
2020–2023	Ankaragücü	1	(0)
2022	→ Ankara Demirspor (loan)	0	(0)
2023	Bodrumspor	0	(0)
2023–	Hacettepe 1945 SK	0	(0)
- * Club domestic league appearances and goals as of 3 September 2023

Mert Topuz (born 19 February 2001) is a Turkish professional footballer who plays as a goalkeeper for TFF Third League club Hacettepe 1945 SK.

== Professional career ==
A youth product of Ankaragücü since 2013, Topuz signed his first professional contract with Ankaragücü in 2020. He made his professional debut with Ankaragücü in a 1–0 Süper Lig loss to Alanyaspor on 15 May 2021.
