= Cebrail Karayel =

Turkish footballer

Personal information
- Full name: Cebrail Karayel
- Date of birth: 15 August 1994 (age 32)
- Place of birth: Sungurlu, Turkey
- Height: 1.76 m (5 ft 9 in)
- Position: Right back

Team information
- Current team: Sarıyer
- Number: 77

Youth career
- 2006–2012: BAKspor
- 2012–2013: Osmanlıspor

Senior career*
Years	Team	Apps	(Gls)
2013–2016	Osmanlıspor	0	(0)
2013	→ BAKspor (loan)	8	(0)
2013–2014	→ Adliyespor (loan)	26	(1)
2014–2016	→ BAKspor (loan)	55	(1)
2016–2018	BAKspor	55	(1)
2018–2019	Şanlıurfaspor	17	(1)
2019–2021	Ankaragücü	23	(0)
2021–2022	Altay	42	(2)
2022–2024	Konyaspor	28	(0)
2024–2025	Sakaryaspor	13	(0)
2025–2026	Iğdır	9	(0)
2026–	Sarıyer	17	(1)
- * Club domestic league appearances and goals as of 6 May 2026

Cebrail Karayel (born 15 August 1994) is a Turkish footballer who plays as a right back for TFF 1. Lig club Sarıyer.

== Career ==
In January 2019, Karayel signed his first professional contract with MKE Ankaragücü, keeping him at the club for 2.5 years. Karayel made his professional debut with Ankaragücü in a 2-2 Süper Lig tie with Çaykur Rizespor on 4 May 2019.

On 1 June 2022, Karayel signed a two-year contract with Konyaspor.
