= 2013–14 Zawisza Bydgoszcz season =

Polish football club season

Zawisza Bydgoszcz are a Polish Football club which are based in Bydgoszcz. During the 2013/14 campaign they will compete in the Ekstraklasa and Polish Cup.

== Ekstraklasa ==
20 July 2013 Match 1	Zawisza Bydgoszcz	0 - 1	Jagiellonia Białystok	Bydgoszcz
15:30	Hermes (yellow card) 56' (yellow-red card); Lewczuk (yellow card) 64'; Wójcicki (yellow card) 73'	Summary	Tosik (yellow card) 29'; Bala 78'; Kupisz (yellow card) 89'	Stadium: Zdzisław Krzyszkowiak Stadium; Attendance: 9,000; Referee: (Poland) Pawel Pskit

26 July 2013 Match 2	Widzew Łódź	2 - 1	Zawisza Bydgoszcz	Łódź
20:30	Višņakovs 36', 83'; Rybicki (yellow card) 85'; Kowalski (yellow card) 90'; Okachi (yellow card) 90+4'	Summary	Wójcicki 18'; Lewczuk (yellow card) 65'	Stadium: Stadion Widzewa; Attendance: 4,500; Referee: (Poland) Szymon Marciniak

2 August 2013 Match 3	Zawisza Bydgoszcz	1 - 1	Pogoń Szczecin	Bydgoszcz
20:30	Goulon 49'; Dudek (yellow card) 69'	Summary	Akahoshi 16'; Ława (yellow card) 35'	Stadium: Zdzisław Krzyszkowiak Stadium; Attendance: 6,000; Referee: (Poland) Tomasz Musial

12 August 2013 Match 4	Piast Gliwice	1 - 1	Zawisza Bydgoszcz	Gliwice
18:00	Król 21'; Zbozień (yellow card) 59'	Summary	Bernardo Vasconcelos 27' (yellow card) 68'; Lewczuk (yellow card) 40'; Goulon (yellow card) 87'	Stadium: Stadion Piast; Attendance: 4,000; Referee: (Poland) Pawe Raczkowski

24 August 2013 Match 5	Zawisza Bydgoszcz	2 - 2	Podbeskidzie Bielsko-Biała	Bydgoszcz
15:30	Hermes (yellow card) 13'; Wójcicki 37'; Bernardo Vasconcelos (yellow card) 41' (goal) 69'; Gevorgyan (yellow card) 85'	Summary	Konieczny (yellow card) 51'; Sokołowski 78'; Marcin Wodecki 89' (pen.)	Stadium: Zdzisław Krzyszkowiak Stadium; Attendance: 6,000; Referee: (Poland) Pawel Pskit

1 September 2013 Match 6	Lech Poznań	3 - 2	Zawisza Bydgoszcz	Poznań
18:00	Ślusarski 4'; Henríquez 18' (yellow card) 19' (yellow-red card); Wołąkiewicz (yellow card) 19'; Classen 53'; Kamiński (yellow card) 66'; Teodorczyk (yellow card) 87'; Kotorowski (yellow card) 90+4'	Summary	Skrzyński (yellow card) 25' (goal) 66'; Masłowski 33' (yellow card) 58'	Stadium: INEA Stadion; Attendance: 19,393; Referee: (Poland) Pawe Raczkowski

14 September 2013 Match 7	Zawisza Bydgoszcz	2 - 0	Cracovia	Bydgoszcz
15:30	Piotr Petasz (yellow card) 18'; André Micael (yellow card) 41'; Drygas (yellow card) 50'; Vasconcelos 60' (yellow card) 61'; Ziajka 68'; Masłowski (yellow card) 87'	Summary	Sebastian Steblecki (yellow card) 86'	Stadium: Zdzisław Krzyszkowiak Stadium; Attendance: 4,113; Referee: (Poland) Szymon Marciniak

21 September 2013 Match 8	Lechia Gdańsk	1 - 1	Zawisza Bydgoszcz	Gdańsk
15:30	Grzelczak 25'; Pazio (yellow card) 65'	Summary	Luís Carlos Lima 33'	Stadium: PGE Arena Gdańsk; Attendance: 17,754; Referee: (Poland) Tomasz Musial

24 September 2013 Match 9	Zawisza Bydgoszcz	2 - 0	Zagłębie Lubin	Bydgoszcz
18:00	Ziajka (yellow card) 35'; Lewczuk (yellow card) 38'; Vasconcelos 62'; Drygas 89'	Summary	Oleksy (yellow card) 46'; Kwiek (yellow card) 50'; Banaś (red card) 69'	Stadium: Zdzisław Krzyszkowiak Stadium; Attendance: 3,500; Referee: (Poland) Pawel Gil

30 September 2013 Match 10	Górnik Zabrze	3 - 2	Zawisza Bydgoszcz	Zabrze
18:00	Kosznik 8'; Zachara 48'; Šteinbors (yellow card) 69'; Sobolewski 90'	Summary	Vasconcelos 5' (pen.); André Micael (yellow card) 17'; Dudek 69' (pen.); Drygas (yellow card) 77'	Stadium: Ernest Pohl Stadium; Attendance: 3,000; Referee: (Poland) Szymon Marciniak

4 October 2013 Match 11	Zawisza Bydgoszcz	0 - 1	Korona Kielce	Bydgoszcz
18:00	Ziajka (yellow card) 32'; Lewczuk (yellow card) 67'; Vasconcelos (yellow card) 90+5'	Summary	Pylypchuk (yellow card) 26'; Staňo (yellow card) 56'; Kamil Sylwestrzak 75'	Stadium: Zdzisław Krzyszkowiak Stadium; Attendance: 3,500; Referee: (Poland) Pawel Gil

19 October 2013 Match 12	Zawisza Bydgoszcz	3 - 1	Wisła Kraków	Bydgoszcz
15:30	Ziajka (yellow card) 15'; Goulon 59'; Masłowski (yellow card) 62' (yellow-red card) (goal) 68'; Luís Carlos Lima 87'; Drygas (yellow card) 90'	Summary	Bunoza (yellow card) 3' (yellow-red card); Garguła 38'; Małecki (yellow card) 78'	Stadium: Zdzisław Krzyszkowiak Stadium; Attendance: 5,500; Referee: (Poland) Pawe Raczkowski

27 October 2013 Match 13	Śląsk Wrocław	1 - 2	Zawisza Bydgoszcz	Wrocław
15:30	Pawelec (yellow card) 35'; Patejuk 55' (yellow card) 69'; Socha (yellow card) 73'	Summary	Luís Carlos Lima 67' (yellow card) 84'; Gevorgyan 74'; Dudek (yellow card) 85'	Stadium: Stadion Miejski; Attendance: 8,759; Referee: (Poland) Pawe Raczkowski

30 October 2013 Match 14	Zawisza Bydgoszcz	3 - 1	Legia Warsaw	Bydgoszcz
20:30	Gevorgyan 7', 47'; Luís Carlos Lima 55'	Summary	Hélio Pinto 24'	Stadium: Zdzisław Krzyszkowiak Stadium; Attendance: 8,000; Referee: (Poland) Szymon Marciniak

5 November 2013 Match 15	Ruch Chorzów	1 - 0	Zawisza Bydgoszcz	Chorzów
18:00	Bartłomiej Babiarz (yellow card) 71'; Kuświk 89'	Summary	Goulon (red card) 27'; Gevorgyan (yellow card) 29'; Luís Carlos Lima (yellow card) 90+2'	Stadium: Stadion Ruchu; Attendance: 5,500; Referee: (Poland) Jarosaw Rykiewicz

8 November 2013 Match 16	Jagiellonia Białystok	1 - 1	Zawisza Bydgoszcz	Białystok
18:00	Plizga 61'; Popkhadze (yellow card) 90'	Summary	Dudek (yellow card) 57'; Gevorgyan 62'	Stadium: Białystok City Stadium; Attendance: 5,089; Referee: (Poland) Tomasz Wajda

23 November 2013 Match 17	Zawisza Bydgoszcz	2 - 0	Widzew Łódź	Bydgoszcz
15:30	Lafrance 3' (o.g.); Drygas (yellow card) 34'; Luís Carlos Lima 56'; André Micael (yellow card) 59'	Summary	Jonathan de Amo Pérez (yellow card) 31'; Kaczmarek (yellow card) 90'	Stadium: Zdzisław Krzyszkowiak Stadium; Attendance: 7,000; Referee: (Poland) Szymon Marciniak

29 November 2013 Match 18	Pogoń Szczecin	1 - 1	Zawisza Bydgoszcz	Szczecin
18:00	Frączczak 22'	Summary	Goulon (yellow card) 24'; Drygas 41'; Masłowski (yellow card) 44'; Ziajka (yellow card) 64'	Stadium: Stadion Florian Krygier; Attendance: 4,100; Referee: (Poland) Tomasz Musial

3 December 2013 Match 19	Zawisza Bydgoszcz	6 - 0	Piast Gliwice	Bydgoszcz
18:00	Masłowski 12', 21', 47', 58'; Lewczuk 36'; Goulon (yellow card) 77' (yellow-red card); Piotr Petasz 85'	Summary	Klepczyński (yellow card) 50'	Stadium: Zdzisław Krzyszkowiak Stadium; Referee: (Poland) Tomasz Musial

8 December 2013 Match 20	Podbeskidzie Bielsko-Biała	0 - 0	Zawisza Bydgoszcz	Bielsko-Biała
15:30	Deja (yellow card) 31'; Chmiel (yellow card) 37'; Mateusz Kupczak (yellow card) 61'; Malinowski (yellow card) 69'	Summary	Strąk (yellow card) 74'; André Micael (yellow card) 82'	Stadium: Stadion Miejski; Referee: (Poland) Marcin Borski

13 December 2013 Match 21	Zawisza Bydgoszcz	2 - 2	Lech Poznań	Bydgoszcz
20:30	Skrzyński (yellow card) 9'; Masłowski 24'; Vasconcelos 58'	Summary	Teodorczyk 22', 30' (yellow card) 84'; Linetty (yellow card) 42'; Trałka (yellow card) 54'; Douglas (yellow card) 70'; Injac (yellow card) 89'; Henríquez (red card) 90+2'	Stadium: Zdzisław Krzyszkowiak Stadium; Attendance: 7,000; Referee: (Poland) Pawel Gil

15 February 2014 Match 22	Cracovia	0 - 2	Zawisza Bydgoszcz	Kraków
13:00	Żytko (yellow card) 78'	Summary	Drygas 73'; Masłowski (yellow card) 76'; Vasconcelos 86' (pen.)	Stadium: Marshal Józef Piłsudski Stadium; Attendance: 8,001; Referee: (Poland) Pawe Raczkowski

24 February 2014 Match 23	Zawisza Bydgoszcz	0 - 3	Lechia Gdańsk	Bydgoszcz
18:00		Summary	Tuszyński 25', 46', 79'; Wiśniewski (yellow card) 29'; Oualembo (yellow card) 32'; Janicki (yellow card) 42'; Makuszewski (yellow card) 45'; Pietrowski (yellow card) 53'	Stadium: Zdzisław Krzyszkowiak Stadium; Attendance: 1,620; Referee: (Poland) Marcin Borski

2 March 2014 Match 24	Zagłębie Lubin	3 - 1	Zawisza Bydgoszcz	Lubin
15:30	Guldan 21'; Rymaniak (yellow card) 67'; Abwo 79'; Piech 82'	Summary	Skrzyński (yellow card) 34'; Masłowski 84' (yellow card) 87'	Stadium: Stadion Zagłębia Lubin; Attendance: 7,042; Referee: (Poland) Pawe Raczkowski

7 March 2014 Match 25	Zawisza Bydgoszcz	3 - 1	Górnik Zabrze	Bydgoszcz
20:30	Gevorgyan 51'; Dudek 63', 68'	Summary	Iwan 20' (yellow card) 64'; Wełnicki (red card) 67'; Kosznik (yellow card) 69'	Stadium: Zdzisław Krzyszkowiak Stadium; Attendance: 1,500; Referee: (Poland) Tomasz Musial

14 March 2014 Match 26	Korona Kielce	1 - 1	Zawisza Bydgoszcz	Kielce
18:00	Dejmek 13'; Malarczyk (yellow card) 45'; Korzym (yellow card) 65'; Golański (yellow card) 70'; Pylypchuk (red card) 75'	Summary	Vasconcelos (yellow card) 45'; Ziajka 81'	Stadium: Kielce City Stadium; Attendance: 6,755; Referee: (Poland) Pawel Gil

21 March 2014 Match 27	Wisła Kraków	0 - 1	Zawisza Bydgoszcz	Kraków
20:30	Brożek (yellow card) 80'; Szewczyk (yellow card) 90+2'	Summary	Drygas (yellow card) 48'; Kadú 69'; Gevorgyan (yellow card) 90+2'	Stadium: Stadion Miejski in Kraków; Attendance: 7,410; Referee: (Poland) Marcin Borski

30 March 2014 Match 28	Zawisza Bydgoszcz	1 - 0	Śląsk Wrocław	Bydgoszcz
15:30	Nawotczyński (yellow card) 8'; Hermes (yellow card) 35'; Drygas 82'	Summary	Socha (yellow card) 59'	Stadium: Zdzisław Krzyszkowiak Stadium; Attendance: 4,200; Referee: (Poland) Szymon Marciniak

6 April 2014 Match 29	Legia Warsaw	3 - 0	Zawisza Bydgoszcz	Warsaw
18:00	Radović (yellow card) 28' (goal) 48', 83'; Żyro 50'	Summary	Drygas (yellow card) 63' (yellow-red card)	Stadium: Polish Army Stadium; Attendance: 17,642; Referee: (Poland) Mariusz Zlotek

12 April 2014 Match 30	Zawisza Bydgoszcz	0 - 3	Ruch Chorzów	Bydgoszcz
18:00	Kadú (yellow card) 2'	Summary	Malinowski (yellow card) 31'; Babiarz 43' (yellow card) 52'; Dziwniel (yellow card) 81'; Surma 87'; Kuświk 90'	Stadium: Zdzisław Krzyszkowiak Stadium; Attendance: 3,000; Referee: (Poland) Tomasz Kwiatkowski

=== League table ===
Pos	Team	Pld	W	D	L	GF	GA	GD	Pts	Qualification
4	Pogoń Szczecin	30	11	14	5	47	38	+9	47	Qualification to Championship round
5	Wisła Kraków	30	12	9	9	38	30	+8	45	Qualification to Championship round
6	Zawisza Bydgoszcz	30	11	9	10	43	37	+6	42 (Note: ZAW 3-1 GÓR; GÓR 3-2 ZAW)	Qualification to Championship round
7	Górnik Zabrze	30	11	9	10	42	46	−4	42	Qualification to Championship round
8	Lechia Gdańsk	30	10	10	10	38	37	+1	40	Qualification to Championship round

Source: Ekstraklasa.org
Rules for classification: 1) points; 2) head-to-head points; 3) head-to-head goal difference; 4) head-to-head goals scored; 5) goal difference; 6) number of goals scored; 7) Fair Play table. Head-to-head record is used only after all the matches between the teams in question have been played

== Polish Cup ==
23 July 2013 Last 64	Lech Rypin	0 - 2	Zawisza Bydgoszcz	Rypin
17:00		Summary	Abbott 46'; Wójcicki 90'	Stadium: Stadion MOSiR; Attendance: 1,000; Referee: (Poland) Wojciech Krzton

17 August 2013 Last 32	Pogoń Szczecin	1 - 3	Zawisza Bydgoszcz	Szczecin
19:30	Robak 27'; Frączczak (yellow card) 59'	Summary	Vasconcelos 2' (yellow card) 52'; Piotr Petasz 11'; Ciechanowski (yellow card) 65'; Masłowski 90'	Stadium: Stadion Florian Krygier; Attendance: 2,000; Referee: (Poland) Tomasz Radkiewicz

16 October 2013 Last 16	GKS Katowice	0 - 1	Zawisza Bydgoszcz	Katowice
18:30		Summary	Piotr Petasz 69'	Stadium: Stadion GKS Katowice; Attendance: 4,000; Referee: (Poland) Jarosaw Przybyl

18 March 2014 Quarter Final First Leg	Zawisza Bydgoszcz	2 - 1	Górnik Zabrze	Bydgoszcz
18:30	Masłowski 40'; Piotr Petasz 70'	Summary	Majtán 21'	Stadium: Zdzisław Krzyszkowiak Stadium; Referee: (Poland) Mariusz Zlotek

26 March 2014 Quarter Final Second Leg	Górnik Zabrze	0 - 3 (1 - 5 agg.)	Zawisza Bydgoszcz	Zabrze
19:45	Iwan (yellow card) 66'; Łukasiewicz (yellow card) 83'	Summary	Drygas 35', 69'Iwan 52' (o.g.)	Stadium: Ernest Pohl Stadium; Attendance: 2,500; Referee: (Poland) Tomasz Kwiatkowski

9 April 2014 Semi Final First Leg	Jagiellonia Białystok	0 - 2	Zawisza Bydgoszcz	Białystok
18:30	Savaļnieks (yellow card) 25'; Gajos (yellow card) 56'	Summary	Luís Carlos Lima 4' (yellow card) 63'; Hermes (yellow card) 38'; Drygas 65' (yellow card) 90+3'; Lewczuk (yellow card) 80'	Stadium: Białystok City Stadium; Attendance: 6,272; Referee: (Poland) Pawel Gil

15 April 2014 Semi Final Second Leg	Zawisza Bydgoszcz	-	Jagiellonia Białystok	Bydgoszcz
17:45				Stadium: Zdzisław Krzyszkowiak Stadium
