= 2013–14 Zagłębie Lubin season =

Polish football club season

Zagłębie Lubin (Polish pronunciation: [zaˈɡwɛmbjɛ ˈlubin]) is a Polish professional football club based in Lubin, Lower Silesia. Founded in 1945 as OMTUR Lubin, the club currently competes in the Ekstraklasa, the highest tier of the Polish football league system. During the 2013–14 campaign they competed in the Ekstraklasa and in the Polish Cup.

Zagłębie Lubin has a rich history in Polish football, having been founded shortly after the end of World War II. The club achieved its first major success in the 1990s, gaining promotion to the Ekstraklasa for the first time in 1992. They went on to establish themselves as a top-flight team, winning the Polish Championship twice (2006–07 and 2008–09) and the Polish Cup once (2007).

2013–14 Season:

The 2013–14 season was a significant one for Zagłębie Lubin. They competed in both the Ekstraklasa and the Polish Cup. They reached the final for the third time in their history. However, they were defeated by Zawisza Bydgoszcz on penalties after a 0–0 draw.

Recent Years:

Since the 2013–14 season, Zagłębie Lubin has continued to be a consistent presence in the Ekstraklasa. They have achieved several top-half finishes and secured a place in the UEFA Europa League qualifications in the 2015–16 season.

Club Honours:

- Ekstraklasa: Champions (2006–07, 2008–09)
- Polish Cup: Winners (2007)
- Polish Super Cup: Winners (2007)

Current Status:

Zagłębie Lubin remains to be a popular team in Polish football. They continue to compete in both domestic and European competitions.

- Zagłębie Lubin was founded in 1945 as OMTUR Lubin. ([Source: Zagłębie Lubin official website])
- They won their first Polish Championship title in the 2006–07 season. ([Source: Ekstraklasa website])
- In the 2013–14 season, they finished 8th in the Ekstraklasa. ([Source: Polish Football Association website])

== Competitions ==
=== Ekstraklasa ===
==== Regular season ====
19 July 2013 Match 1	Zagłębie Lubin	0 - 2	Pogoń Szczecin	Lubin
18:00	Woźniak (yellow card) 71'	Summary	Dąbrowski 5'; Akahoshi 29'	Stadium: Stadion Zagłębia Lubin; Attendance: 8,135; Referee: (Poland) Tomasz Wajda

28 July 2013 Match 2	Piast Gliwice	2 - 1	Zagłębie Lubin	Gliwice
15:30	Hanzel (yellow card) 25'; Carles Martínez (yellow card) 41'; Wilczek 80'; Rubén Jurado 82'; Szumski (yellow card) 90'	Summary	Przybecki 9'; Rymaniak (yellow card) 48'	Stadium: Stadion Piast; Attendance: 3,150; Referee: (Poland) Marcin Borski

4 August 2013 Match 3	Zagłębie Lubin	0 - 0	Lech Poznań	Lubin
20:30	Rymaniak (yellow card) 62'; Woźniak (yellow card) 78'	Summary		Stadium: Stadion Zagłębia Lubin; Attendance: 10,872; Referee: (Poland) Pawel Pskit

9 August 2013 Match 4	Podbeskidzie Bielsko-Biała	0 - 0	Zagłębie Lubin	Bielsko-Biała
18:00	Frank Kwame (yellow card) 70'	Summary		Stadium: Stadion Miejski; Attendance: 2,500; Referee: (Poland) Tomasz Musial

23 August 2013 Match 5	Zagłębie Lubin	0 - 1	KS Cracovia	Lubin
18:00	Bonecki (yellow card) 28'; Rakowski (yellow card) 50'; Rymaniak (yellow card) 65'	Summary	Żytko (yellow card) 25'; Dąbrowski (yellow card) 40'; Krzysztof Danielewicz (yellow card) 53'; Budziński 72'	Stadium: Stadion Zagłębia Lubin; Attendance: 5,467; Referee: (Poland) Bartosz Frankowski

30 August 2013 Match 6	Ruch Chorzów	0 - 2	Zagłębie Lubin	Chorzów
18:00	Konczkowski (yellow card) 8'; Janoszka (yellow card) 70'; Malinowski (yellow card) 78'	Summary	Papadopulos 28'; Vidanov (yellow card) 64'; Bílek (yellow card) 67'; Piech 73'	Stadium: Stadion Ruchu; Attendance: 6,800; Referee: (Poland) Tomasz Radkiewicz

16 September 2013 Match 7	Górnik Zabrze	2 - 1	Zagłębie Lubin	Zabrze
18:00	Kosznik 23'; Nakoulma 30'; Przybylski (yellow card) 37'	Summary	Guldan (yellow card) 26'; Piech 61'; Banaś (yellow card) 80'; Piątek (yellow card) 84'	Stadium: Ernest Pohl Stadium; Attendance: 3,000; Referee: (Poland) Pawel Pskit

21 September 2013 Match 8	Zagłębie Lubin	2 - 0	Korona Kielce	Lubin
20:30	Piech (yellow card) 41' (goal) 45'; Kwiek (yellow card) 56'; Čotra 83'	Summary	Małkowski (yellow card) 56'; Malarczyk (yellow card) 74' (yellow-red card); Lisowski (yellow card) 87'	Stadium: Stadion Zagłębia Lubin; Attendance: 5,237; Referee: (Poland) Krzysztof Jakubik

24 September 2013 Match 9	Zawisza Bydgoszcz	2 - 0	Zagłębie Lubin	Bydgoszcz
18:00	Ziajka (yellow card) 35'; Lewczuk (yellow card) 38'; Bernardo Vasconcelos 62'; Drygas 89'	Summary	Oleksy (yellow card) 46'; Kwiek (yellow card) 50'; Banaś (red card) 69'	Stadium: Zdzisław Krzyszkowiak Stadium; Attendance: 3,500; Referee: (Poland) Pawel Gil

29 September 2013 Match 10	Zagłębie Lubin	1 - 1	Jagiellonia Białystok	Lubin
15:30	Abwo 8'; Rymaniak (yellow card) 80'	Summary	Ukah (yellow card) 38'; Plizga (yellow card) 46'; Gajos (yellow card) 68'; Mateusz Piątkowski 87'	Stadium: Stadion Zagłębia Lubin; Attendance: 6,240; Referee: (Poland) Sebastian Jarzebak

4 October 2013 Match 11	Śląsk Wrocław	2 - 0	Zagłębie Lubin	Wrocław
20:30	Marco Paixão 15'; Dudu Paraíba 49' (pen.); Plaku (yellow card) 59'; Kaźmierczak (yellow card) 60'; Stevanović (yellow card) 88'	Summary	Čotra (yellow card) 49' (yellow-red card); Papadopulos (yellow card) 78'	Stadium: Stadion Miejski; Attendance: 15,649; Referee: (Poland) Pawel Pskit

19 October 2013 Match 12	Zagłębie Lubin	3 - 1	Widzew Łódź	Lubin
18:00	Błąd 77', 85'; Čotra 80'	Summary	Batrović (yellow card) 49'; Višņakovs 65'	Stadium: Stadion Zagłębia Lubin; Attendance: 5,000; Referee: (Poland) Tomasz Musial

26 October 2013 Match 13	Wisła Kraków	1 - 0	Zagłębie Lubin	Kraków
20:30	Garguła 39'; Chrapek (yellow card) 56'; Guerrier (yellow card) 68'; Burliga (yellow card) 75'	Summary	Jež (yellow card) 81'	Stadium: Stadion Miejski; Attendance: 10,753; Referee: (Poland) Jarosaw Rynkiewicz

==== League table ====
Pos	Team	Pld	W	D	L	GF	GA	GD	Pts	Qualification
12	Śląsk Wrocław	30	7	13	10	38	40	−2	34 (Note: ŚLĄ 0-0 PIA; PIA 1-1 ŚLĄ)	Qualification to Relegation round
13	Piast Gliwice	30	8	10	12	29	47	−18	34	Qualification to Relegation round
14	Podbeskidzie Bielsko-Biała	30	6	13	11	27	39	−12	31	Qualification to Relegation round
15	Zagłębie Lubin	30	7	8	15	31	40	−9	29	Qualification to Relegation round
16	Widzew Łódź	30	5	7	18	26	51	−25	22	Qualification to Relegation round

Source: Ekstraklasa.org
Rules for classification: 1) points; 2) head-to-head points; 3) head-to-head goal difference; 4) head-to-head goals scored; 5) goal difference; 6) number of goals scored; 7) Fair Play table. Head-to-head record is used only after all the matches between the teams in question have been played

==== League table ====
Pos	Team	Pld	W	D	L	GF	GA	GD	Pts	Relegation
9	Śląsk Wrocław	37	12	15	10	49	41	+8	34	
10	Podbeskidzie Bielsko-Biała	37	10	15	12	39	45	−6	30	
11	Jagiellonia Białystok	37	12	12	13	59	58	+1	29	
12	Piast Gliwice	37	11	12	14	43	56	−13	28	
13	Korona Kielce	37	10	14	13	47	56	−9	26	
14	Cracovia	37	12	8	17	43	56	−13	25	
15	Widzew Łódź (R)	37	8	9	20	36	59	−23	22	Relegation to I liga
16	Zagłębie Lubin (R)	37	7	9	21	32	51	−19	16	Relegation to I liga

Source: Ekstraklasa.org
Rules for classification: 1) points; 2) points in regular season; 3) head-to-head points in regular season; 4) head-to-head goal difference in regular season; 5) head-to-head goals scored in regular season; 6) goal difference; 7) number of goals scored; 8) Fair Play table
(R) Relegated
