= 2013–14 Ekstraklasa =

88th season of top-tier football league in Poland

Ekstraklasa
- Season: 2013–14
- Champions: Legia Warsaw (10th title)
- Relegated: Zagłębie Lubin; Widzew Łódź
- Champions League: Legia Warsaw
- Europa League: Zawisza Bydgoszcz; Lech Poznań; Ruch Chorzow
- Matches: 296
- Goals: 786 (2.66 per match)
- Top goalscorer: Marcin Robak (22 goals)
- Biggest home win: Jagiellonia 6–0 Ruch; Zawisza 6–0 Piast
- Biggest away win: Cracovia 1–6 Lech
- Highest scoring: Korona 3–5 Legia; Jagiellonia 4–4 Korona
- Longest winning run: 8 games Legia Warsaw
- Longest unbeaten run: 11 games Wisła Kraków
- Longest winless run: 13 games Widzew Łódź
- Longest losing run: 5 games Wisła Kraków
- Highest attendance: 38,458; Lech 1–1 Legia (27 October 2013)
- Total attendance: 2,487,003 ▲
- Average attendance: 8,403 ▼0.1%

The 2013–14 Ekstraklasa (also known as T-Mobile Ekstraklasa due to its sponsorship by T-Mobile Polska) was the 88th season of the Polish Football Championship, the 80th season of the highest tier domestic division in the Polish football league system since its establishment in 1927 and the 6th season of the Ekstraklasa under its current title. The league was operated by the Ekstraklasa SA.

A total of 16 teams were participating, 14 of which competed in the league during the 2012–13 season, while the remaining two were promoted from the I liga. Each team played a total of 30 matches, half at home and half away. After 30th round, league was split into 'champion' (top eight teams) and 'relegation' (bottom eight teams) groups. Each team played seven more games (1-4 and 9-12 teams played four times at home), starting with half the points achieved during the first phase of 30 matches. The changes extended the season to total of 296 matches played.

Legia Warsaw were the defending champions, winning their 9th title the previous season. Legia successfully defended their title.

== Teams ==
Promotion and relegation as usual was determined by the position in the table from prior season. The bottom two teams were directly relegated to the I Liga, while the top two teams are promoted to the Ekstraklasa.

Polonia Warsaw dissolved after the previous season. GKS Bełchatów finished 16th and were relegated to the Polish First League as a result. Zawisza Bydgoszcz and Cracovia finished 1st and 2nd, respectively, in the I Liga gained promotion. Cracovia returned to the top level at the first attempt, but Zawisza returned to it after 19 years.

=== Stadiums and locations ===
Location of teams in 2013–14 Ekstraklasa
Location of teams in the Katowice urban area

Club	Location	Venue	Capacity	Av. Att.
Cracovia	Kraków	Stadion im. Marszałka Józefa Piłsudskiego	15,016	7,756
Górnik Zabrze	Zabrze	Stadion im. Ernesta Pohla	3,000	2,999
Jagiellonia Białystok	Białystok	Stadion Jagiellonii	7,000	4,964
Korona Kielce	Kielce	Kolporter Arena	15,500	6,870
Lech Poznań	Poznań	INEA Stadion	43,269	19,256
Lechia Gdańsk	Gdańsk	PGE Arena Gdańsk	43,615	13,000
Legia Warsaw	Warsaw	Pepsi Arena	31,103	15,029
Piast Gliwice	Gliwice	Arena Gliwice	10,037	5,104
Podbeskidzie Bielsko-Biała	Bielsko-Biała	Stadion BBOSiR	4,279	3,036
Pogoń Szczecin	Szczecin	Stadion im. Floriana Krygiera	18,027	7,157
Ruch Chorzów	Chorzów	Stadion Ruchu Chorzów	10,000	6,223
Widzew Łódź	Łódź	Stadion im. Ludwika Sobolewskiego	10,000	5,492
Wisła Kraków	Kraków	Stadion im. Henryka Reymana	33,268	14,636
Zagłębie Lubin	Lubin	Stadion Zagłębia	16,068	6,217
Zawisza Bydgoszcz	Bydgoszcz	Stadion im. Zdzisława Krzyszkowiaka	20,247	5,082
Śląsk Wrocław	Wrocław	Stadion Wrocław	42,771	10,655

Cracovia	Górnik	Jagiellonia	Korona	Lech	Lechia
Stadion im. Marszałka Józefa Piłsudskiego	Stadion im. Ernesta Pohla	Stadion Jagiellonii	Kolporter Arena	INEA Stadion	PGE Arena Gdańsk
Capacity: 15,016	Capacity: 3,000	Capacity: 7,000	Capacity: 15,500	Capacity: 43,269	Capacity: 43,615
Legia	Piast	Podbeskidzie	Pogoń	Ruch	Widzew
Pepsi Arena	Arena Gliwice	Stadion BBOSiR	Stadion im. Floriana Krygiera	Stadion Ruchu Chorzów	Stadion im. Ludwika Sobolewskiego
Capacity: 31,103	Capacity: 10,037	Capacity: 4,279	Capacity: 18,027	Capacity: 10,000	Capacity: 10,000
	Wisła	Zagłębie	Zawisza	Śląsk	
	Stadion im. Henryka Reymana	Stadion Zagłębia	Stadion im. Zdzisława Krzyszkowiaka	Stadion Wrocław	
	Capacity: 33,268	Capacity: 16,068	Capacity: 20,247	Capacity: 42,771	

=== Personnel and kits ===
Team	Manager	Captain	Kit manufacturer	Shirt sponsor
Cracovia	(Poland) Mirosław Hajdo	(Poland) Sławomir Szeliga	Nike	Comarch
Górnik Zabrze	(Poland) Robert Warzycha	(Poland) Adam Danch	adidas	Kompania Węglowa, Allianz
Jagiellonia Białystok	(Poland) Michał Probierz	(Poland) Rafał Grzyb	Under Armour	Eurocash, Wschodzący Białystok
Korona Kielce	(Spain) José Rojo Martín	(Poland) Maciej Korzym	adidas	Lewiatan
Lech Poznań	(Poland) Mariusz Rumak	(Poland) Hubert Wołąkiewicz	Puma	STS
Lechia Gdańsk	(Netherlands) Ricardo Moniz	(Poland) Jarosław Bieniuk	adidas	LOTOS
Legia Warsaw	(Norway) Henning Berg	(Croatia) Ivica Vrdoljak	adidas	Fortuna
Piast Gliwice	(Spain) Ángel Pérez García	(Poland) Tomasz Podgórski	adidas	Miasto Gliwice, Kar-Tel
Podbeskidzie Bielsko-Biała	(Poland) Leszek Ojrzyński	(Poland) Marek Sokołowski	Masita	Murapol, KREDYTY-Chwilówki
Pogoń Szczecin	(Poland) Dariusz Wdowczyk	(Poland) Bartosz Ława	Nike	Grupa Azoty, Szczecin
Ruch Chorzów	(Slovakia) Ján Kocian	(Poland) Marcin Malinowski	adidas	Węglokoks, WOŚP
Śląsk Wrocław	(Poland) Tadeusz Pawłowski	(Portugal) Marco Paixão	Puma	TAURON Polska Energia
Widzew Łódź	(Poland) Artur Skowronek	(Poland) Mateusz Cetnarski	Vigo	—
Wisła Kraków	(Poland) Franciszek Smuda	(Poland) Arkadiusz Głowacki	adidas	TELE-FONIKA
Zagłębie Lubin	(Poland) Piotr Stokowiec	(Poland) Adam Banaś	Nike	KGHM
Zawisza Bydgoszcz	(Poland) Ryszard Tarasiewicz	(Poland) Łukasz Skrzyński	Masita	SOLBET

== Regular season ==
=== League table ===
Pos	Team	Pld	W	D	L	GF	GA	GD	Pts	Qualification
1	Legia Warsaw	30	20	3	7	60	30	+30	63	Qualification to Championship round
2	Lech Poznań	30	15	8	7	56	34	+22	53	Qualification to Championship round
3	Ruch Chorzów	30	14	8	8	40	38	+2	50	Qualification to Championship round
4	Pogoń Szczecin	30	11	14	5	47	38	+9	47	Qualification to Championship round
5	Wisła Kraków	30	12	9	9	38	30	+8	45	Qualification to Championship round
6	Zawisza Bydgoszcz	30	11	9	10	43	37	+6	42 (Note: ZAW 3-1 GÓR; GÓR 3-2 ZAW)	Qualification to Championship round
7	Górnik Zabrze	30	11	9	10	42	46	−4	42	Qualification to Championship round
8	Lechia Gdańsk	30	10	10	10	38	37	+1	40	Qualification to Championship round
9	Cracovia	30	11	6	13	37	43	−6	39 (Note: CRA 1-0 JAG; JAG 1-2 CRA)	Qualification to Relegation round
10	Jagiellonia Białystok	30	10	9	11	46	43	+3	39	Qualification to Relegation round
11	Korona Kielce	30	9	10	11	36	41	−5	37	Qualification to Relegation round
12	Śląsk Wrocław	30	7	13	10	38	40	−2	34 (Note: ŚLĄ 0-0 PIA; PIA 1-1 ŚLĄ)	Qualification to Relegation round
13	Piast Gliwice	30	8	10	12	29	47	−18	34	Qualification to Relegation round
14	Podbeskidzie Bielsko-Biała	30	6	13	11	27	39	−12	31	Qualification to Relegation round
15	Zagłębie Lubin	30	7	8	15	31	40	−9	29	Qualification to Relegation round
16	Widzew Łódź	30	5	7	18	26	51	−25	22	Qualification to Relegation round

Source: Ekstraklasa.org
Rules for classification: 1) points; 2) head-to-head points; 3) head-to-head goal difference; 4) head-to-head goals scored; 5) goal difference; 6) number of goals scored; 7) Fair Play table. Head-to-head record is used only after all the matches between the teams in question have been played

=== Results ===
Home \ Away	CRA	GÓR	JAG	KOR	LGD	LPO	LEG	PIA	PBB	POG	RUC	ŚLĄ	WID	WIS	ZLU	ZAW
Cracovia		2–0	1–0	1–2	2–1	1–6	0–1	2–3	4–2	0–1	2–1	0–1	1–1	1–1	2–0	0–2
Górnik Zabrze	0–1		3–3	0–0	0–0	0–3	0–3	2–1	2–0	1–1	2–2	3–2	3–2	3–2	2–1	3–2
Jagiellonia Białystok	1–2	0–1		1–1	0–1	2–0	2–3	1–1	2–2	2–3	6–0	3–1	1–0	5–2	1–0	1–1
Korona Kielce	1–0	2–2	4–1		1–0	1–0	3–5	2–0	2–1	2–2	1–4	0–0	2–1	2–3	1–1	1–1
Lechia Gdańsk	3–1	1–1	2–0	2–2		1–4	2–0	3–1	2–2	2–3	0–0	1–2	2–0	0–0	2–1	1–1
Lech Poznań	1–1	3–1	6–1	2–0	2–1		1–1	4–0	2–1	1–2	4–2	2–1	1–0	2–0	1–1	3–2
Legia Warsaw	4–1	2–1	0–3 (Note: The match was registered with a score of 0–3 because of Legia's fans.)	1–0	0–1	1–0		4–1	4–0	3–1	2–0	2–1	5–1	2–2	2–0	3–0
Piast Gliwice	1–1	2–0	2–1	1–1	0–0	0–2	1–2		0–0	2–2	0–2	1–1	3–0	0–1	2–1	1–1
Podbeskidzie Bielsko-Biała	1–1	1–2	0–1	1–0	3–1	0–0	1–0	0–1		0–0	0–0	3–3	1–0	0–0	0–0	0–0
Pogoń Szczecin	0–0	1–4	1–1	3–2	1–1	5–1	0–3	4–0	2–1		3–1	2–2	1–0	0–0	1–1	1–1
Ruch Chorzów	3–2	2–1	1–0	2–0	1–1	1–1	2–1	0–2	0–1	1–1		1–1	2–1	1–1	0–2	1–0
Śląsk Wrocław	0–3	1–1	2–3	1–1	1–0	2–0	1–1	0–0	4–0	1–1	2–3		3–1	0–0	2–0	1–2
Widzew Łódź	1–3	0–3	1–1	2–1	4–1	2–2	0–1	1–1	1–1	2–1	0–1	0–0		2–1	0–0	2–1
Wisła Kraków	3–1	0–0	1–1	1–0	3–0	2–0	1–0	3–0	0–1	2–1	0–1	3–0	3–0		1–0	0–1
Zagłębie Lubin	0–1	3–0	1–1	2–0	1–3	0–0	1–3	0–2	3–2	0–2	1–2	2–2	3–1	3–1		3–1
Zawisza Bydgoszcz	2–0	3–1	0–1	0–1	0–3	2–2	3–1	6–0	2–2	1–1	0–3	1–0	2–0	3–1	2–0	

Source: 90minut.pl
Legend: Blue = home team win; Yellow = draw; Red = away team win.

== Play-offs ==
=== Championship round ===
==== League table ====
Pos	Team	Pld	W	D	L	GF	GA	GD	Pts	Qualification
1	Legia Warsaw (C)	37	26	3	8	75	34	+41	50	Qualification to Champions League second qualifying round
2	Lech Poznań	37	19	9	9	68	40	+28	40	Qualification to Europa League second qualifying round
3	Ruch Chorzów	37	16	11	10	47	48	−1	34	Qualification to Europa League second qualifying round
4	Lechia Gdańsk	37	13	13	11	46	41	+5	32	
5	Wisła Kraków	37	14	11	12	51	46	+5	31	
6	Górnik Zabrze	37	14	10	13	53	57	−4	31	
7	Pogoń Szczecin	37	11	17	9	50	50	0	27	
8	Zawisza Bydgoszcz	37	12	10	15	48	48	0	25	Qualification to Europa League second qualifying round (Note: Zawisza Bydgoszcz have qualified for the second qualifying round of the 2014–15 UEFA Europa League for winning the 2013–14 Polish Cup.)

Source: Ekstraklasa.org
Rules for classification: 1) points; 2) points in regular season; 3) head-to-head points in regular season; 4) head-to-head goal difference in regular season; 5) head-to-head goals scored in regular season; 6) goal difference; 7) number of goals scored; 8) Fair Play table. Head-to-head record is used only after all the matches between the teams in question have been played
(C) Champions

==== Results ====
Home \ Away	LEG	LPO	RUC	POG	WIS	ZAW	GÓR	LGD
Legia Warsaw		2–0	1–2		5–0	2–0		
Lech Poznań			4–0	0–0	3–0		2–1	
Ruch Chorzów				0–0	2–2	3–1		0–0
Pogoń Szczecin	0–1					1–2	2–2	0–2
Wisła Kraków				5–0		2–1	2–3	
Zawisza Bydgoszcz		1–2					0–1	0–0
Górnik Zabrze	2–3		2–0					0–2
Lechia Gdańsk	0–1	2–1			2–2			

Source: 90minut.pl
Legend: Blue = home team win; Yellow = draw; Red = away team win.

=== Relegation round ===
==== League table ====
Pos	Team	Pld	W	D	L	GF	GA	GD	Pts	Relegation
9	Śląsk Wrocław	37	12	15	10	49	41	+8	34	
10	Podbeskidzie Bielsko-Biała	37	10	15	12	39	45	−6	30	
11	Jagiellonia Białystok	37	12	12	13	59	58	+1	29	
12	Piast Gliwice	37	11	12	14	43	56	−13	28	
13	Korona Kielce	37	10	14	13	47	56	−9	26	
14	Cracovia	37	12	8	17	43	56	−13	25	
15	Widzew Łódź (R)	37	8	9	20	36	59	−23	22	Relegation to I liga
16	Zagłębie Lubin (R)	37	7	9	21	32	51	−19	16	Relegation to I liga

Source: Ekstraklasa.org
Rules for classification: 1) points; 2) points in regular season; 3) head-to-head points in regular season; 4) head-to-head goal difference in regular season; 5) head-to-head goals scored in regular season; 6) goal difference; 7) number of goals scored; 8) Fair Play table
(R) Relegated

==== Results ====
Home \ Away	CRA	JAG	KOR	ŚLĄ	PIA	PBB	ZLU	WID
Cracovia		2–2	1–1		1–5	0–1		
Jagiellonia Białystok			4–4	0–3	4–3		1–0	
Korona Kielce				1–5	0–1	3–2		2–2
Śląsk Wrocław	1–0					0–0	1–0	1–0
Piast Gliwice				0–0		2–2	2–0	
Podbeskidzie Bielsko-Biała		2–1					2–0	3–0
Zagłębie Lubin	1–2		0–0					0–3 (Note: The match was registered with a score of 0–3 because of Zagłębie's fans.)
Widzew Łódź	2–0	1–1			2–1			

Source: 90minut.pl
Legend: Blue = home team win; Yellow = draw; Red = away team win.

== Season statistics ==
=== Top goalscorers ===
As of games played 1 June 2014.

Rank	Player	Club	Goals
1	(Poland) Marcin Robak	Piast Gliwice / Pogoń Szczecin	22
2	(Portugal) Marco Paixão	Śląsk Wrocław	21
3	(Poland) Łukasz Teodorczyk	Lech Poznań	20
4	(Poland) Paweł Brożek	Wisła Kraków	17
5	(Spain) Dani Quintana	Jagiellonia Białystok	15
6	(Spain) Rubén Jurado	Piast Gliwice	14
6	(Serbia) Miroslav Radovic	Legia Warsaw	14
8	(Poland) Grzegorz Kuświk	Ruch Chorzów	12
8	(Latvia) Eduards Višņakovs	Widzew Łódź	12
10	(Poland) Mateusz Zachara	Górnik Zabrze	11
11	(Georgia (country)) Vladimir Dvalishvili	Legia Warsaw	10
11	(Poland) Łukasz Garguła	Wisła Kraków	10
11	(Burkina Faso) Prejuce Nakoulma	Górnik Zabrze	10
11	(Poland) Filip Starzyński	Ruch Chorzów	10

== Awards ==
=== Annual awards ===
Award	Player	Club
Player of the Season	(Serbia) Miroslav Radović	Legia Warsaw
Goalkeeper of the Season	(Serbia) Dušan Kuciak	Legia Warsaw
Defender of the Season	(Poland) Arkadiusz Głowacki	Wisła Kraków
Midfielder of the Season	(Serbia) Miroslav Radović	Legia Warsaw
Forward of the Season	(Poland) Marcin Robak	Piast Gliwice & Pogoń Szczecin
Coach of the Season	(Slovakia) Ján Kocian	Ruch Chorzów
Goal of the Season	(Poland) Marcin Malinowski	Ruch Chorzów
Save of the Season	(Poland) Krzysztof Baran	Jagiellonia Białystok
Discovery of the Season	(Poland) Michał Masłowski	Zawisza Bydgoszcz
Plus of the Season	(Hungary) Gergő Lovrencsics	Lech Poznań

== Number of teams by voivodeship ==
	Voivodeship or country	Number of teams	Teams
1	Silesian Voivodeship	4	Górnik Zabrze, Piast Gliwice, Podbeskidzie Bielsko-Biała and Ruch Chorzów
2	Lesser Poland Voivodeship	2	Cracovia and Wisła Kraków
2	Lower Silesian Voivodeship	2	Śląsk Wrocław and Zagłębie Lubin
4	Greater Poland Voivodeship	1	Lech Poznań
4	Kuyavian-Pomeranian Voivodeship	1	Zawisza Bydgoszcz
4	Łódź Voivodeship	1	Widzew Łódź
4	Masovian Voivodeship	1	Legia Warsaw
4	Podlaskie Voivodeship	1	Jagiellonia Białystok
4	Pomeranian Voivodeship	1	Lechia Gdańsk
4	Świętokrzyskie Voivodeship	1	Korona Kielce
4	West Pomeranian Voivodeship	1	Pogoń Szczecin

== Attendances ==
No.	Club	Average	Highest
1	Lech Poznań	19,575	38,458
2	Legia Warszawa	17,010	29,749
3	Lechia Gdańsk	12,849	24,276
4	Wisła Kraków	12,652	32,458
5	Śląsk Wrocław	10,486	18,761
6	Pogoń Szczecin	7,522	12,284
7	Cracovia	7,504	14,125
8	Korona Kielce	6,684	10,098
9	Ruch Chorzów	6,332	8,800
10	Zagłębie Lubin	6,018	10,872
11	Piast Gliwice	5,282	9,053
12	Widzew Łódź	5,218	8,000
13	Jagiellonia Białystok	4,786	6,927
14	Zawisza Bydgoszcz	4,730	12,789
15	Podbeskidzie Bielsko-Biala	3,032	3,651
16	Górnik Zabrze	2,999	3,000
