= Filip Jagiełło =

Polish footballer (born 1997)

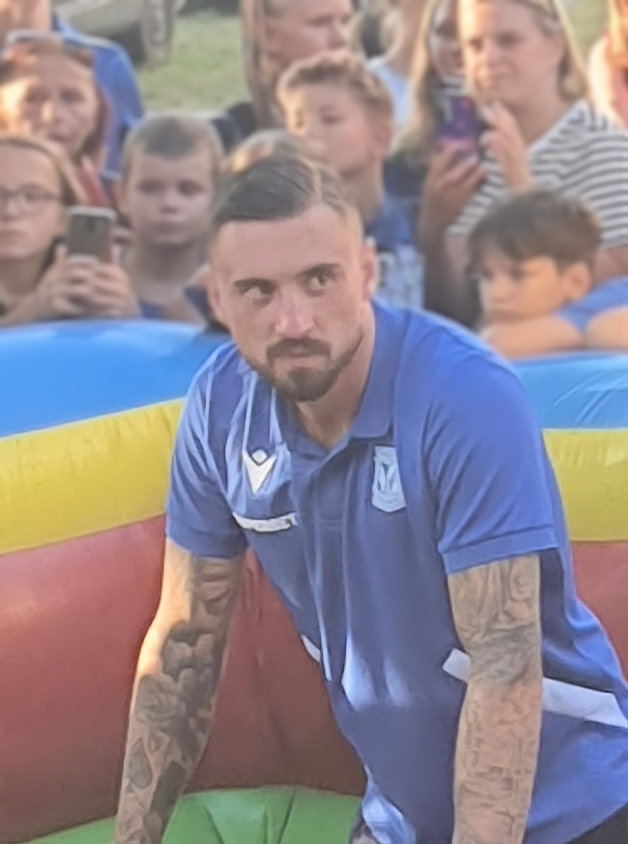
- Jagiełło with Lech Poznań in 2024

Personal information
- Full name: Filip Wojciech Jagiełło
- Date of birth: 8 August 1997 (age 29)
- Place of birth: Lubin, Poland
- Height: 1.80 m (5 ft 11 in)
- Position: Midfielder

Team information
- Current team: Lech Poznań
- Number: 24

Youth career
- –2013: Zagłębie Lubin

Senior career*
| Years | Team | Apps | (Gls) |
| 2013–2017 | Zagłębie Lubin II | 64 | (15) |
| 2013–2019 | Zagłębie Lubin | 78 | (3) |
| 2019–2024 | Genoa | 47 | (4) |
| 2019 | → Zagłębie Lubin (loan) | 15 | (2) |
| 2020–2022 | → Brescia (loan) | 62 | (9) |
| 2024 | → Spezia (loan) | 13 | (1) |
| 2024– | Lech Poznań | 64 | (4) |

International career
| 2010–2011 | Poland U15 | 4 | (1) |
| 2012 | Poland U16 | 8 | (1) |
| 2013–2014 | Poland U17 | 6 | (2) |
| 2014–2016 | Poland U18 | 2 | (0) |
| 2016–2017 | Poland U20 | 12 | (3) |
| 2018–2019 | Poland U21 | 9 | (1) |
- * Club domestic league appearances and goals as of 11:03, 16 November 2026 (UTC)

Filip Wojciech Jagiełło (born 8 August 1997) is a Polish professional footballer who plays as a midfielder for Ekstraklasa club Lech Poznań.

== Career ==
Born in Lubin, Poland, Jagiełło started his career in his local club Zagłębie Lubin. When he was a teenager, he was targeted by clubs such as Juventus and AFC Ajax but decided to stay in Lubin.

He made his debut for Zagłębie in a 2–1 defeat to Ruch Chorzów on 15 December 2013.

On 31 January 2019, Jagiełło signed a 4.5-year contract with Italian club Genoa and was loaned back to Zagłębie for the remainder of the 2018–19 season.

On 5 October 2020, he joined Serie B club Brescia on loan. Jagiełło returned to Brescia on another season-long loan on 9 August 2021.

On 17 January 2024, Jagiełło moved on loan to Spezia in Serie B.

On 12 August 2024, Ekstraklasa club Lech Poznań announced they had reached an agreement with Genoa to sign Jagiełło. The deal was formalised the following day, and he signed a three-year contract, with an option for another year.

== Career statistics ==
As of match played 8 November 2026

Appearances and goals by club, season and competition
| Club | Season | League | | | National cup (Note: Includes Polish Cup, Coppa Italia) | | Europe | | Other | | Total | |
| Club | Season | Division | Apps | Goals | Apps | Goals | Apps | Goals | Apps | Goals | Apps | Goals |
|---|---|---|---|---|---|---|---|---|---|---|---|---|
| Zagłębie Lubin II | 2013–14 | III liga, gr. E | 16 | 1 | — | | — | | — | | 16 | 1 |
| Zagłębie Lubin II | 2014–15 | III liga, gr. E | 19 | 9 | 1 | 0 | — | | — | | 20 | 9 |
| Zagłębie Lubin II | 2015–16 | III liga, gr. E | 23 | 3 | — | | — | | — | | 23 | 3 |
| Zagłębie Lubin II | 2016–17 | IV liga | 6 | 2 | — | | — | | — | | 6 | 2 |
| Zagłębie Lubin II | Total | | 64 | 15 | 1 | 0 | — | | — | | 65 | 15 |
| Zagłębie Lubin | 2013–14 | Ekstraklasa | 4 | 0 | 0 | 0 | — | | — | | 4 | 0 |
| Zagłębie Lubin | 2014–15 | I liga | 4 | 0 | 0 | 0 | — | | — | | 4 | 0 |
| Zagłębie Lubin | 2015–16 | Ekstraklasa | 4 | 1 | 2 | 0 | — | | — | | 6 | 1 |
| Zagłębie Lubin | 2016–17 | Ekstraklasa | 17 | 0 | 0 | 0 | 0 | 0 | — | | 17 | 0 |
| Zagłębie Lubin | 2017–18 | Ekstraklasa | 32 | 1 | 3 | 0 | — | | — | | 35 | 1 |
| Zagłębie Lubin | 2018–19 | Ekstraklasa | 32 | 3 | 0 | 0 | — | | — | | 32 | 3 |
| Zagłębie Lubin | Total | | 93 | 5 | 5 | 0 | 0 | 0 | — | | 98 | 5 |
| Genoa | 2019–20 | Serie A | 11 | 0 | 1 | 0 | — | | — | | 12 | 0 |
| Genoa | 2022–23 | Serie B | 34 | 4 | 2 | 0 | — | | — | | 36 | 4 |
| Genoa | 2023–24 | Serie A | 2 | 0 | 1 | 0 | — | | — | | 3 | 0 |
| Genoa | Total | | 47 | 4 | 4 | 0 | — | | — | | 51 | 4 |
| Brescia (loan) | 2020–21 | Serie B | 34 | 6 | 1 | 0 | — | | 1 (Note: Appearance in Serie B promotion play-off) | 0 | 36 | 6 |
| Brescia (loan) | 2021–22 | Serie B | 28 | 3 | 1 | 0 | — | | 3 | 0 | 32 | 3 |
| Brescia (loan) | Total | | 62 | 9 | 2 | 0 | — | | 4 | 0 | 68 | 9 |
| Spezia (loan) | 2023–24 | Serie B | 13 | 1 | — | | — | | — | | 13 | 1 |
| Lech Poznań | 2024–25 | Ekstraklasa | 26 | 2 | 1 | 0 | — | | — | | 27 | 2 |
| Lech Poznań | 2025–26 | Ekstraklasa | 27 | 1 | 2 | 1 | 8 (Note: Two appearances and one goal in UEFA Champions League, one appearance and one goal in UEFA Europa League, five appearances in UEFA Conference League) | 2 | 1 (Note: Appearance in Polish Super Cup) | 0 | 38 | 4 |
| Lech Poznań | 2026–27 | Ekstraklasa | 11 | 1 | 1 | 0 | 7 (Note: Two appearances and one goal in UEFA Champions League, five appearances in UEFA Europa League) | 1 | 1 | 0 | 20 | 2 |
| Lech Poznań | Total | | 64 | 4 | 4 | 1 | 15 | 3 | 2 | 0 | 85 | 8 |
| Career total | | | 343 | 38 | 16 | 1 | 15 | 3 | 6 | 0 | 380 | 42 |

== Honours ==
Zagłębie Lubin

- I liga: 2014–15

Zagłębie Lubin II

- IV liga Lower Silesia West: 2016–17

Lech Poznań

- Ekstraklasa: 2024–25, 2025–26
- Polish Super Cup: 2026

Individual

- Ekstraklasa Young Player of the Month: February 2019
