= Michał Masłowski =

Polish footballer (born 1989)

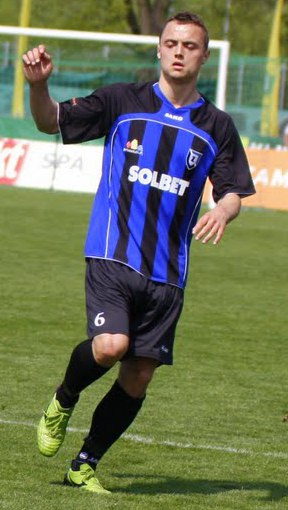

Personal information
- Full name: Michał Adam Masłowski
- Date of birth: 19 December 1989 (age 36)
- Place of birth: Strzelin, Poland
- Height: 1.78 m (5 ft 10 in)
- Position: Midfielder

Youth career
- 2005–2008: Strzelinianka Strzelin
- 2008–2009: Zieloni Łagiewniki
- 2009–2010: Strzelinianka Strzelin

Senior career*
| Years | Team | Apps | (Gls) |
| 2010–2011 | Lechia Dzierżoniów | 27 | (9) |
| 2011–2015 | Zawisza Bydgoszcz | 86 | (18) |
| 2015–2017 | Legia Warsaw | 22 | (0) |
| 2016–2017 | Legia Warsaw II | 7 | (2) |
| 2016–2017 | → Piast Gliwice (loan) | 30 | (1) |
| 2017–2020 | HNK Gorica | 57 | (5) |
| 2021–2023 | Zagłębie Sosnowiec | 37 | (3) |
| 2023–2024 | Gwardia Koszalin | 28 | (8) |
| 2024–2025 | Mazovia Mińsk Mazowiecki | 11 | (1) |
| Total | | 305 | (47) |

International career
| 2014 | Poland | 3 | (0) |
- * Club domestic league appearances and goals

Michał Adam Masłowski (born 19 December 1989) is a Polish former professional footballer who played as a midfielder. On 18 January 2014, he made his debut for the Poland national team in a friendly against Norway.

== Career statistics ==
=== Club ===
Appearances and goals by club, season and competition
| Club | Season | League | | | National cup (Note: Includes Polish Cup, Croatian Cup) | | Europe | | Other | | Total | |
| Club | Season | Division | Apps | Goals | Apps | Goals | Apps | Goals | Apps | Goals | Apps | Goals |
|---|---|---|---|---|---|---|---|---|---|---|---|---|
| Lechia Dzierżoniów | 2010–11 | III liga, gr. E | 27 | 9 | — | | — | | — | | 27 | 9 |
| Zawisza Bydgoszcz | 2011–12 | I liga | 20 | 5 | 2 | 0 | — | | — | | 22 | 5 |
| Zawisza Bydgoszcz | 2012–13 | I liga | 31 | 3 | 2 | 0 | — | | — | | 33 | 3 |
| Zawisza Bydgoszcz | 2013–14 | Ekstraklasa | 27 | 8 | 5 | 2 | — | | — | | 32 | 10 |
| Zawisza Bydgoszcz | 2014–15 | Ekstraklasa | 8 | 2 | 0 | 0 | 0 | 0 | 0 | 0 | 8 | 2 |
| Zawisza Bydgoszcz | Total | | 86 | 18 | 9 | 2 | 0 | 0 | 0 | 0 | 95 | 20 |
| Legia Warsaw | 2014–15 | Ekstraklasa | 12 | 0 | 4 | 1 | 2 (Note: Appearance(s) in UEFA Europa League) | 0 | — | | 18 | 1 |
| Legia Warsaw | 2015–16 | Ekstraklasa | 10 | 0 | 1 | 0 | 3 | 0 | 1 (Note: Appearance in Polish Super Cup) | 0 | 15 | 0 |
| Legia Warsaw | 2016–17 | Ekstraklasa | 0 | 0 | 0 | 0 | 0 | 0 | 1 | 0 | 1 | 0 |
| Legia Warsaw | Total | | 22 | 0 | 5 | 1 | 5 | 0 | 2 | 0 | 34 | 1 |
| Legia Warsaw II | 2015–16 | III liga, gr. A | 4 | 0 | — | | — | | — | | 4 | 0 |
| Legia Warsaw II | 2017–18 | III liga, gr. I | 3 | 2 | — | | — | | — | | 3 | 2 |
| Legia Warsaw II | Total | | 7 | 2 | — | | — | | — | | 7 | 2 |
| Piast Gliwice (loan) | 2016–17 | Ekstraklasa | 30 | 1 | 1 | 0 | 2 | 0 | — | | 33 | 1 |
| Gorica | 2017–18 | 2. HNL | 25 | 3 | 1 | 0 | — | | — | | 26 | 3 |
| Gorica | 2018–19 | 1. HNL | 10 | 0 | 0 | 0 | — | | — | | 10 | 0 |
| Gorica | 2019–20 | 1. HNL | 22 | 2 | 0 | 0 | — | | — | | 22 | 2 |
| Gorica | Total | | 57 | 5 | 1 | 0 | — | | — | | 58 | 5 |
| Zagłębie Sosnowiec | 2020–21 | I liga | 11 | 1 | — | | — | | — | | 11 | 1 |
| Zagłębie Sosnowiec | 2021–22 | I liga | 10 | 1 | 0 | 0 | — | | — | | 10 | 0 |
| Zagłębie Sosnowiec | 2022–23 | I liga | 16 | 1 | 2 | 0 | — | | — | | 18 | 1 |
| Zagłębie Sosnowiec | Total | | 37 | 3 | 2 | 0 | — | | — | | 39 | 3 |
| Gwardia Koszalin | 2022–23 | IV liga Pomerania | 12 | 1 | — | | — | | — | | 12 | 1 |
| Gwardia Koszalin | 2023–24 | IV liga Pomerania | 16 | 7 | — | | — | | — | | 16 | 7 |
| Gwardia Koszalin | Total | | 28 | 8 | — | | — | | — | | 28 | 8 |
| Mazovia Mińsk Mazowiecki | 2023–24 | IV liga Masovia | 8 | 0 | — | | — | | — | | 8 | 0 |
| Mazovia Mińsk Mazowiecki | 2024–25 | IV liga Masovia | 3 | 1 | — | | — | | — | | 3 | 1 |
| Mazovia Mińsk Mazowiecki | Total | | 11 | 1 | — | | — | | — | | 11 | 1 |
| Career total | | | 305 | 47 | 18 | 3 | 7 | 0 | 2 | 0 | 333 | 50 |

=== International ===
Appearances and goals by national team and year
| National team | Year | Apps | Goals |
|---|---|---|---|
Poland
| Poland | 2014 | 3 | 0 |
| Total | | 3 | 0 |

== Honours ==
Zawisza Bydgoszcz

- I liga: 2012–13
- Polish Cup: 2013–14

Legia Warsaw

- Ekstraklasa: 2015–16
- Polish Cup: 2014–15, 2015–16

Individual

- Ekstraklasa Discovery of the Season: 2013–14
