= Daniel Dziwniel =

Polish footballer (born 1992)

Personal information
- Full name: Daniel Dziwniel
- Date of birth: 19 August 1992 (age 34)
- Place of birth: Frankfurt am Main, Germany
- Height: 1.78 m (5 ft 10 in)
- Position: Left-back

Youth career
- Eintracht Frankfurt
- Kickers Offenbach

Senior career*
| Years | Team | Apps | (Gls) |
| 2011–2012 | Kickers Offenbach II | 11 | (0) |
| 2011–2013 | Kickers Offenbach | 14 | (0) |
| 2013–2015 | Ruch Chorzów | 48 | (2) |
| 2015–2016 | St. Gallen | 3 | (0) |
| 2016–2019 | Zagłębie Lubin | 41 | (2) |
| 2019–2020 | Korona Kielce | 10 | (0) |
| 2020–2021 | Sandecja Nowy Sącz | 29 | (1) |
| 2021–2024 | Górnik Łęczna | 67 | (0) |
| 2024–2026 | Podbeskidzie | 35 | (0) |
| Total | | 258 | (5) |

International career
| 2012–2014 | Poland U21 | 14 | (0) |
- * Club domestic league appearances and goals

Daniel Dziwniel (born 19 August 1992) is a former professional footballer who played as a left-back. Born in Germany, he represented Poland at under-21 international level and holds dual Polish-German citizenship.

== Club career ==
On 25 August 2020, Dziwniel signed a one-year contract with Sandecja Nowy Sącz.

== International career ==
From 2012 to 2014, he was a part of Poland national under-21 team.

== Honours ==
Zagłębie Lubin II

- IV liga Lower Silesia West: 2016–17
