= Hermes (footballer, born 1974) =

Brazilian footballer

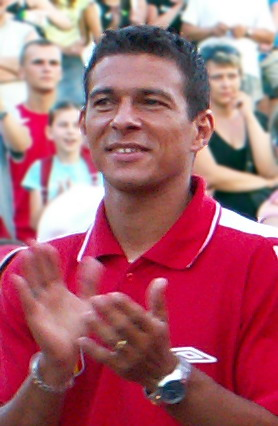
- Hermes in 2006

Personal information
- Full name: Hermes Neves Soares
- Date of birth: 19 September 1974 (age 52)
- Place of birth: São Paulo, Brazil
- Height: 1.68 m (5 ft 6 in)
- Position: Midfielder

Team information
- Current team: Jagiellonia Białystok (assistant)

Senior career*
Years	Team	Apps	(Gls)
1995	Corinthians		
1996	Bahia	21	(1)
1997	Londrina		
1997	Rio Branco Americana		
1998	Bahia		
1998	Santo André		
1999	São Bento		
1999	Ituano		
2000	Brusque		
2001	Olímpia		
2002	Goiânia		
2002	Widzew Łódź	11	(1)
2003–2008	Korona Kielce	110	(3)
2008–2011	Jagiellonia Białystok	96	(2)
2012	Polonia Bytom	12	(0)
2012–2014	Zawisza Bydgoszcz	48	(1)

International career
1993	Brazil U20		

Managerial career
- 2014: Zawisza Bydgoszcz II
- 2016: Chojniczanka Chojnice (caretaker)
- 2017: Unia Solec Kujawski
- 2018–2021: Jagiellonia Białystok (youth)
- 2022–2023: Arka Gdynia
- 2025: Unia Swarzędz
- 2025: Mławianka Mława
Medal record
Men's football
Representing Brazil
FIFA World Youth Championship
Winner	1993 Australia
- * Club domestic league appearances and goals

Hermes Neves Soares, nicknamed Hermes (born 19 September 1974) is a Brazilian professional football manager and former player who played as a midfielder. He is currently the assistant manager of Ekstraklasa club Jagiellonia Białystok.

== Club career ==
Hermes previously played for Bahia in the Campeonato Brasileiro.

== International career ==
He was a member of Brazil national under-20 football team, which won the World Youth Cup in 1993.

== Managerial statistics ==
As of match played 31 October 2025

Managerial record by team and tenure
Team	From	To	Record							
Team	From	To	G	W	D	L	GF	GA	GD	Win %
Chojniczanka Chojnice (caretaker)	9 November 2016	17 December 2016	3	1	2	0	5	3	+2	33.33
Unia Solec Kujawski	11 October 2017	18 December 2017	7	2	2	3	8	11	−3	28.57
Arka Gdynia	24 November 2022	11 April 2023	8	3	3	2	15	10	+5	37.50
Unia Swarzędz	1 January 2025	4 November 2025	32	11	9	12	42	44	−2	34.38
Mławianka Mława	2 December 2025	20 December 2025	0	0	0	0	0	0	—	
Total			50	17	16	17	70	68	+2	34.00

== Personal life ==
Hermes has lived in Poland since 2002. When he moved to the country, he planned to stay for only a year. Years later, he admitted that Poland was his new homeland. On 10 April 2014, the Kuyavian-Pomeranian Voivode, Ewa Mes, presented Hermes with Polish citizenship. He is married to Geiza, and they have daughters, Sara and Hana, and a son, Alvaro.

== Honours ==
=== Player ===
Corinthians

- Copa do Brasil: 1995

Korona Kielce

- II liga: 2004–05
- III liga, group IV: 2003–04

Jagiellonia Białystok

- Polish Cup: 2009–10
- Polish Super Cup: 2010

Zawisza Bydgoszcz

- I liga: 2012–13
- Polish Cup: 2013–14

Brazil U20

- FIFA World Youth Championship: 1993
