= Đorđe Čotra =

Serbian footballer

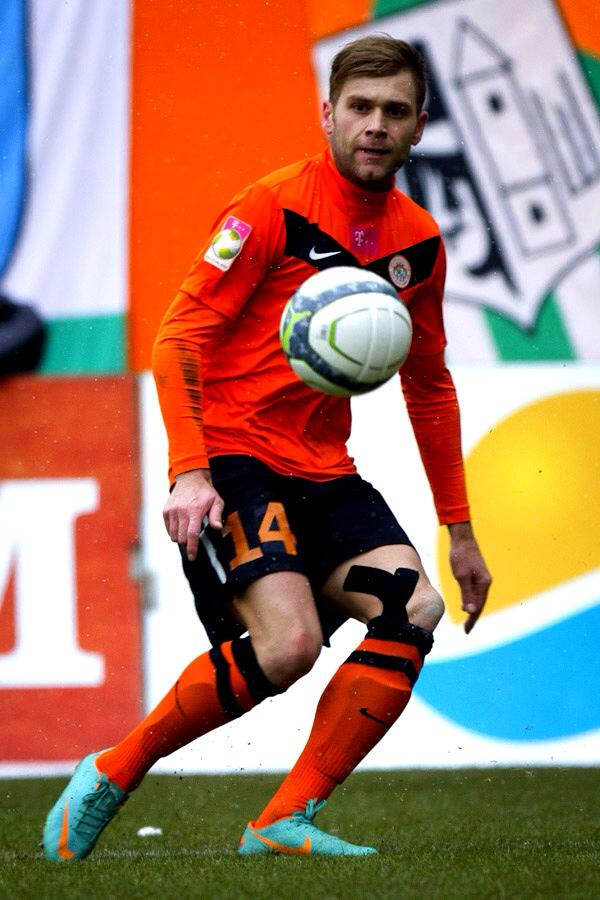

Personal information
- Full name: Đorđe Čotra
- Date of birth: 13 September 1984 (age 42)
- Place of birth: Benkovac, SR Croatia, Yugoslavia
- Height: 1.82 m (5 ft 11 1/2 in)
- Position: Left-back

Senior career*
Years	Team	Apps	(Gls)
2002–2004	BSK Batajnica		
2004–2006	BSK Borča	61	(3)
2006–2008	Vojvodina	11	(0)
2007	→ BSK Borča (loan)	11	(0)
2008	→ Hajduk Kula (loan)	2	(0)
2008–2010	Rad	51	(3)
2011–2013	Polonia Warsaw	34	(0)
2013–2017	Zagłębie Lubin	123	(3)
2017–2019	Śląsk Wrocław	29	(1)
- * Club domestic league appearances and goals

Đorđe Čotra (Serbian Cyrillic: Ђорђе Чотра; born 13 September 1984) is a Serbian former professional footballer who played as a left-back.

== Career ==
In January 2011, he joined Polish club Polonia Warsaw on two-and-a-half-year contract.

On 22 June 2017, he signed a contract with Śląsk Wrocław.

== Honours ==
Zagłębie Lubin

- I liga: 2014–15
