= Tomasz Lisowski =

Polish footballer (born 1985)

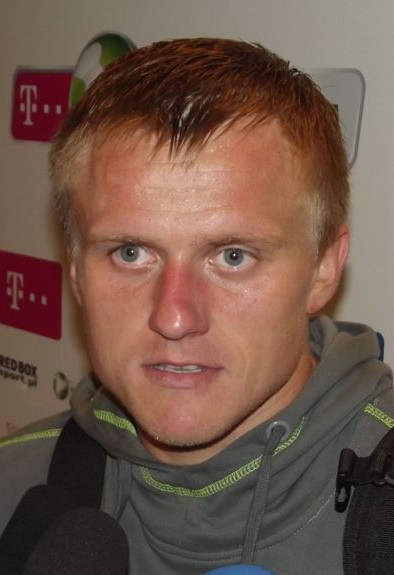
- Lisowski in 2011

Personal information
- Full name: Tomasz Lisowski
- Date of birth: 4 April 1985 (age 41)
- Place of birth: Braniewo, Poland
- Height: 1.80 m (5 ft 11 in)
- Position: Defender

Team information
- Current team: AP 16 Gdynia
- Number: 7

Youth career
- Zatoka Braniewo
- Polonia Elbląg
- Stomil Olsztyn
- 2003: Amica Wronki

Senior career*
Years	Team	Apps	(Gls)
2003–2006	Amica Wronki	6	(0)
2007	Górnik Łęczna	18	(1)
2007–2010	Widzew Łódź	75	(5)
2011–2014	Korona Kielce	75	(1)
2014–2015	Pogoń Szczecin	2	(0)
2015	Widzew Łódź	9	(0)
2015–2016	Chojniczanka Chojnice	5	(0)
2016–2017	Radomiak Radom	3	(0)
2024–	AP 16 Gdynia	20	(2)

International career
2007–2008	Poland	3	(0)
- * Club domestic league appearances and goals as of 16:49, 30 June 2026 (UTC)

Tomasz Lisowski (born 4 April 1985) is a Polish professional footballer who plays as a defender for Klasa B club Akademia Piłkarska 16 Gdynia.

== Career ==
In February 2011, Lisowski joined Korona Kielce before debuting in a 3–3 draw against Polonia Bytom on 12 March. He made three appearances for the Poland national team, debuting on 15 December 2007 in a 2–0 friendly victory over Bosnia and Herzegovina.

== Honours ==
Widzew Łódź

- I liga: 2008–09, 2009–10
