= Andrzej Iwan =

Polish footballer (1959–2022)

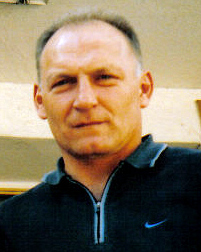

Personal information
- Date of birth: 10 November 1959
- Place of birth: Kraków, Poland
- Date of death: 27 December 2022 (aged 63)
- Place of death: Kraków, Poland
- Height: 1.75 m (5 ft 9 in)
- Position: Forward

Youth career
- 1968–1975: Wanda Kraków

Senior career*
Years	Team	Apps	(Gls)
1976–1985	Wisła Kraków	198	(69)
1985–1987	Górnik Zabrze	67	(21)
1988–1989	VfL Bochum	30	(2)
1989	Górnik Zabrze	3	(0)
1990–1991	Aris	30	(2)
1992	Górnik Zabrze	1	(0)
Total		329	(94)

International career
- Poland U18
1978–1987	Poland	29	(11)

Managerial career
- 2003–2005: Okocimski KS Brzesko
- 2005–2006: Płomień Jerzmanowice
- 2006–2008: Orlęta Rudawa
Medal record
Men's football
Representing Poland
FIFA World Cup
Third place	1982 Spain
UEFA European Under-18 Championship
Third place	1978 Poland
- * Club domestic league appearances and goals

Andrzej Iwan (10 November 1959 – 27 December 2022) was a Polish professional footballer who played as a forward. In 1987, he won the Polish Footballer of the Year Award presented by the Piłka Nożna football weekly.

== Club career ==
Iwan made first steps on a long football career in Wanda Kraków, but in 1976 he moved to Wisła Kraków where he entered professional football, contributing a great deal to the title in 1978. He played 198 games and scored 69 goals for Wisła Kraków, before he was transferred to Górnik Zabrze. In next two years he proved to be a key player for a new team, a dominant force in the middle of 80s in Polish football. As he started career as a striker, he experienced transformation in Górnik Zabrze into a playmaker. He spent the last years of his professional career abroad (VfL Bochum, Aris Saloniki) punctuated by short returns to Górnik Zabrze. He won four Polish Championships (Wisła and Górnik) and ended up with 226 games and 90 goals in the Polish League. Additionally, he participated in 17 games in European club competitions and scored four goals.

== International career ==
Iwan made his debut in the Poland national team in the second game of the 1978 FIFA World Cup, against Tunisia, at the age of 18, being the youngest player in the tournament. Four years later he became a first team player in the 1982 FIFA World Cup until injury in the second game ruled him out from the next games. He gave up the international career in 1987 with 11 goals in 29 matches.

== Career statistics ==
=== International ===
Appearances and goals by national team and year
National team	Year	Apps	Goals
Poland	1978	2	0
Poland	1979	0	0
Poland	1980	9	9
Poland	1981	8	1
Poland	1982	2	0
Poland	1983	3	1
Poland	1984	1	0
Poland	1985	1	0
Poland	1986	0	0
Poland	1987	3	0
Total		29	11

== Coaching career ==
On his retirement as a player, Iwan embarked on a coaching profession, for the first few years with a junior team in Wisła Kraków, leading him to the assistant position of the first team between 1999 and 2001, under Adam Nawałka and Orest Lenczyk. In Zagłębie Lubin, he was again an assistant to Adam Nawałka, however, they were relieved of their duties after only five months of working at the club. In 2003, Iwan leaped at the opportunity to lead a team, a fourth league club Okocimski KS Brzesko. He worked there for two years until his dismissal in 2005, following a series of defeats. Prior to that, Okocimski Brzesko had been close to promotion in 2004, but lost the play-offs to Kmita Zabierzów. Iwan managed three more teams, Płomien Jerzmanowice (fifth league, 2005–06) and Wiatra Ludźmierz (junior team, 2006) and Orlęta Rudawa until his coaching career was finally brought to a close.

== Media career ==
In the last years, Iwan made regular appearance as football expert to commentate on Polish Ekstraklasa. Iwan's biography under the title "Spalony" (combination of meanings Offside/Burnt) was released in 2012.

== Personal life and death ==
Iwan was a father of Bartosz Iwan, a former player of Ekstraklasa sides, such as Widzew Łódź, Odra Wodzisław Śląski, Piast Gliwice and Górnik Zabrze.

Iwan died on 27 December 2022, at the age of 63.

== Honours ==
Wisła Kraków

- Ekstraklasa: 1977–78

Górnik Zabrze

- Ekstraklasa: 1985–86, 1986–87, 1987–88

Poland

- FIFA World Cup third place: 1982

Poland U18

- UEFA European Under-18 Championship third place: 1978

Individual

- Piłka Nożna Polish Footballer of the Year: 1987
