= Sebastian Dudek =

Polish footballer

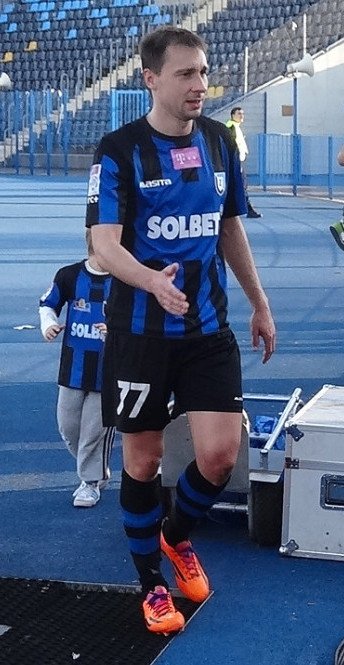

Personal information
- Full name: Sebastian Dudek
- Date of birth: 19 January 1980 (age 46)
- Place of birth: Żary, Poland
- Height: 1.82 m (6 ft 0 in)
- Position: Midfielder

Team information
- Current team: Warta Kamieńskie Młyny

Senior career*
Years	Team	Apps	(Gls)
1998–2005	Promień Żary		
2005–2012	Śląsk Wrocław	136	(23)
2012–2013	Widzew Łódź	27	(1)
2013–2014	Zawisza Bydgoszcz	31	(1)
2014–2017	Zagłębie Sosnowiec	85	(13)
2018	Polonia Bytom		
2018–2019	Warta Kamieńskie Młyny		
2019	Tęcza Błędów		
2019–2021	Cyklon Rogoźnik		
2021–	Warta Kamieńskie Młyny		
- * Club domestic league appearances and goals as of 27 June 2022

Sebastian Dudek (born 19 January 1980) is a Polish professional footballer who plays for Warta Kamieńskie Młyny as a midfielder.

During the 2011–12 UEFA Europa League, he scored a top corner goal against Dundee United, which secured his team's place in the next round.

== Career ==
His career began in 1998, when he joined the team Promień Żary.

== Honours ==
Śląsk Wrocław

- Ekstraklasa: 2011–12
- Ekstraklasa Cup: 2009

Zawisza Bydgoszcz

- Polish Cup: 2013–14
