= Bartosz Iwan =

Polish footballer

Personal information
- Full name: Bartosz Iwan
- Date of birth: 18 April 1984 (age 42)
- Place of birth: Kraków, Poland
- Height: 1.86 m (6 ft 1 in)
- Position: Midfielder

Team information
- Current team: Orzeł Bębło (Manager)

Youth career
- Strzelcy Kraków

Senior career*
Years	Team	Apps	(Gls)
2001–2005	Wisła Kraków II		
2005–2006	Widzew Łódź	34	(10)
2007	Odra Wodzisław	12	(1)
2008–2009	GKS Katowice	44	(16)
2010–2011	Piast Gliwice	38	(9)
2011–2012	Olimpia Elbląg	15	(4)
2012	Garbarnia Kraków	9	(2)
2012–2015	Górnik Zabrze	74	(8)
2015–2016	GKS Katowice	19	(3)
2016	Wilki Wilcza		
2019–2020	Wieczysta Kraków	11	(1)
2022	Batory Wola Batorska	4	(0)

Managerial career
- 2019–2020: Wieczysta Kraków (player-assistant)
- 2022: LKS Czarnochowice
- 2024–2025: Piast Wołowice
- 2025: Zielonka Wrząsowice
- 2025–: Orzeł Bębło
- * Club domestic league appearances and goals

Bartosz Iwan (born 18 April 1984) is a Polish former professional footballer who played as a midfielder. He is currently the manager of Orzeł Bębło.

== Career ==
In July 2011, he joined Olimpia Elbląg on a one-year contract.

In 2019, he joined Wieczysta Kraków as a playing assistant coach. In June 2020, his contract with Wieczysta was dissolved.

In August 2022, Iwan was appointed manager of LKS Czarnochowice. He was, however, dismissed after just 3 matches. In January 2024, he was appointed manager of Piast Wołowice. He was fired in May 2025.

Iwan was appointed manager of Zielonka Wrząsowice in July 2025; however, this cooperation proved to be extremely short-lived, ending after only a few days. He was then immediately appointed as the new manager of Orzeł Bębło, which was confirmed on August 1, 2025.

== Personal life ==
He is a son of former Poland international Andrzej Iwan.

== Honours ==
Widzew Łódź

- II liga: 2005–06
