= Igor Lewczuk =

Polish footballer (born 1985)

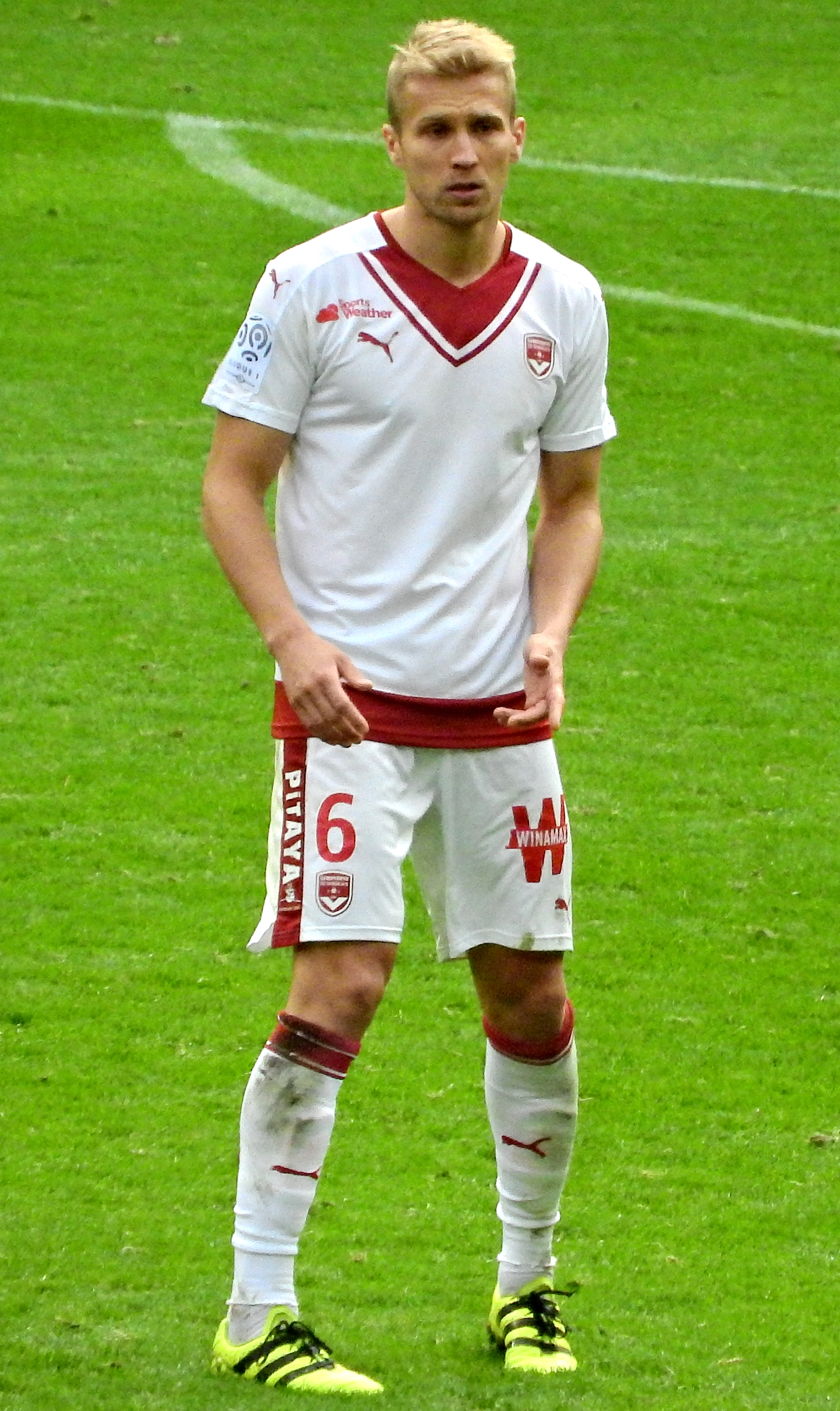
- Lewczuk playing for Girondins Bordeaux in 2016

Personal information
- Date of birth: 30 May 1985 (age 41)
- Place of birth: Białystok, Poland
- Height: 1.89 m (6 ft 2 in)
- Position: Centre-back

Team information
- Current team: Ożarowianka Ożarów Maz.

Senior career*
Years	Team	Apps	(Gls)
2003–2006	Hetman Białystok		
2006–2008	Znicz Pruszków		(6)
2008–2012	Jagiellonia Białystok	50	(1)
2010–2011	→ Piast Gliwice (loan)	13	(0)
2011–2012	→ Ruch Chorzów (loan)	18	(1)
2012–2013	Ruch Chorzów	19	(0)
2013–2014	Zawisza Bydgoszcz	36	(1)
2014–2016	Legia Warsaw	56	(3)
2016–2019	Bordeaux	38	(1)
2019–2021	Legia Warsaw	37	(1)
2021–2023	Znicz Pruszków	27	(1)
2023–2024	Weszło Warsaw	38	(4)
2024–2026	KS CK Troszyn	52	(8)
2026–	Ożarowianka Ożarów Maz.	0	(0)

International career
2014	Poland	2	(0)
- * Club domestic league appearances and goals as of 22:05, 1 June 2026 (UTC)

Igor Lewczuk (born 30 May 1985) is a Polish professional footballer who plays as a centre-back for V liga Masovia club Ożarowianka Ożarów Mazowiecki. Besides Poland, he has played in France.

== Career ==
In January 2011, he was loaned to Piast Gliwice.

In June 2011, he was loaned to Ruch Chorzów on a one-year deal.

On 19 June 2014, Lewczuk signed three-year deal with Legia Warsaw.

On 31 August 2016, French club Bordeaux announced that Lewczuk would play for them for the next two seasons.

On 12 June 2019, Lewczuk returned to Legia Warsaw on a one-year contract with an option for a further year.

== Career statistics ==
=== Club ===
As of match played 30 May 2026

Appearances and goals by club, season and competition
Club	Season	League			National cup (Note: Includes Polish Cup, Coupe de France)		Europe		Other		Total	
Club	Season	Division	Apps	Goals	Apps	Goals	Apps	Goals	Apps	Goals	Apps	Goals
Znicz Pruszków	2006–07	III liga, gr. I		3	3	0	—				3	3
Znicz Pruszków	2007–08	II liga	32	3	2	1	—		—		34	4
Znicz Pruszków	Total		32	6	5	1	—		—		37	7
Zagłębie Lubin (loan)	2007–08	Ekstraklasa	—		—		—		1 (Note: Appearances in Ekstraklasa Cup)	0	1	0
Jagiellonia Białystok	2008–09	Ekstraklasa	23	0	1	0	—		2	0	26	0
Jagiellonia Białystok	2009–10	Ekstraklasa	26	1	6	0	—		—		32	1
Jagiellonia Białystok	2010–11	Ekstraklasa	1	0	2	0	1 (Note: Appearance(s) in UEFA Europa League)	0	0	0	4	0
Jagiellonia Białystok	Total		50	1	9	0	1	0	2	0	62	1
Piast Gliwice (loan)	2010–11	I liga	13	0	—		—		—		13	0
Ruch Chorzów (loan)	2011–12	Ekstraklasa	18	1	4	0	—		—		22	1
Ruch Chorzów	2012–13	Ekstraklasa	19	0	3	0	2	0	—		24	0
Zawisza Bydgoszcz	2013–14	Ekstraklasa	36	1	8	0	—		—		44	1
Legia Warsaw	2014–15	Ekstraklasa	22	1	4	0	1	0	1 (Note: Appearance in Polish Super Cup)	0	28	1
Legia Warsaw	2015–16	Ekstraklasa	29	1	6	1	8	0	1	0	44	2
Legia Warsaw	2016–17	Ekstraklasa	5	1	1	0	6 (Note: Appearances in UEFA Champions League)	0	1	0	24	0
Legia Warsaw	Total		56	3	11	1	15	0	3	0	85	4
Legia Warsaw II	2014–15	III liga, gr. A	3	0	—		—		—		3	0
Bordeaux	2016–17	Ligue 1	25	1	4	0	—		4 (Note: Appearances in Coupe de la Ligue)	0	33	1
Bordeaux	2017–18	Ligue 1	7	0	0	0	2	0	—		9	0
Bordeaux	2018–19	Ligue 1	6	0	0	0	7	0	—		13	0
Bordeaux	Total		38	1	4	0	2	0	11	0	55	1
Legia Warsaw	2019–20	Ekstraklasa	26	1	3	1	5	0	—		34	2
Legia Warsaw	2020–21	Ekstraklasa	11	0	0	0	2 (Note: One appearance in UEFA Champions League, one appearance in UEFA Europa League)	0	1	0	14	0
Legia Warsaw	Total		37	1	3	1	7	0	1	0	48	2
Legia Warsaw II	2020–21	III liga, gr. I	2	0	—		—		—		2	0
Znicz Pruszków	2021–22	II liga	27	1	1	0	—		—		28	1
Weszło Warsaw	2022–23	V liga Masovia I	6	0	—		—		—		6	0
Weszło Warsaw	2023–24	IV liga Masovia	32	4	—		—		—		32	4
Weszło Warsaw	Total		38	4	—		—		—		38	4
KS CK Troszyn	2024–25	IV liga Masovia	31	6	—		—		—		31	6
KS CK Troszyn	2025–26	III liga, group I	21	2	—		—		—		21	2
KS CK Troszyn	Total		52	8	—		—		—		52	8
Ożarowianka Ożarów Maz.	2026–27	V liga Masovia I	0	0	—		—		—		0	0
Career total			421	27	48	3	27	0	18	0	514	30

=== International ===
Appearances and goals by national team and year
National team	Year	Apps	Goals
Poland
Poland	2014	2	0
Total		2	0

== Honours ==
Znicz Pruszków

- III liga, group I: 2006–07
- Polish Cup (Masovia regionals): 2006–07

Jagiellonia Białystok

- Polish Cup: 2009–10

Zawisza Bydgoszcz

- Polish Cup: 2013–14

Legia Warsaw

- Ekstraklasa: 2015–16, 2016–17, 2019–20, 2020–21
- Polish Cup: 2014–15, 2015–16

Weszło Warsaw

- V liga Masovia I: 2022–23
- Polish Cup (Warsaw regionals): 2023–24

KS CK Troszyn

- IV liga Masovia: 2024–25
- Polish Cup (Ciechanów-Ostrołęka regionals): 2024–25
