= Kamil Drygas =

Polish professional footballer (born 1991)

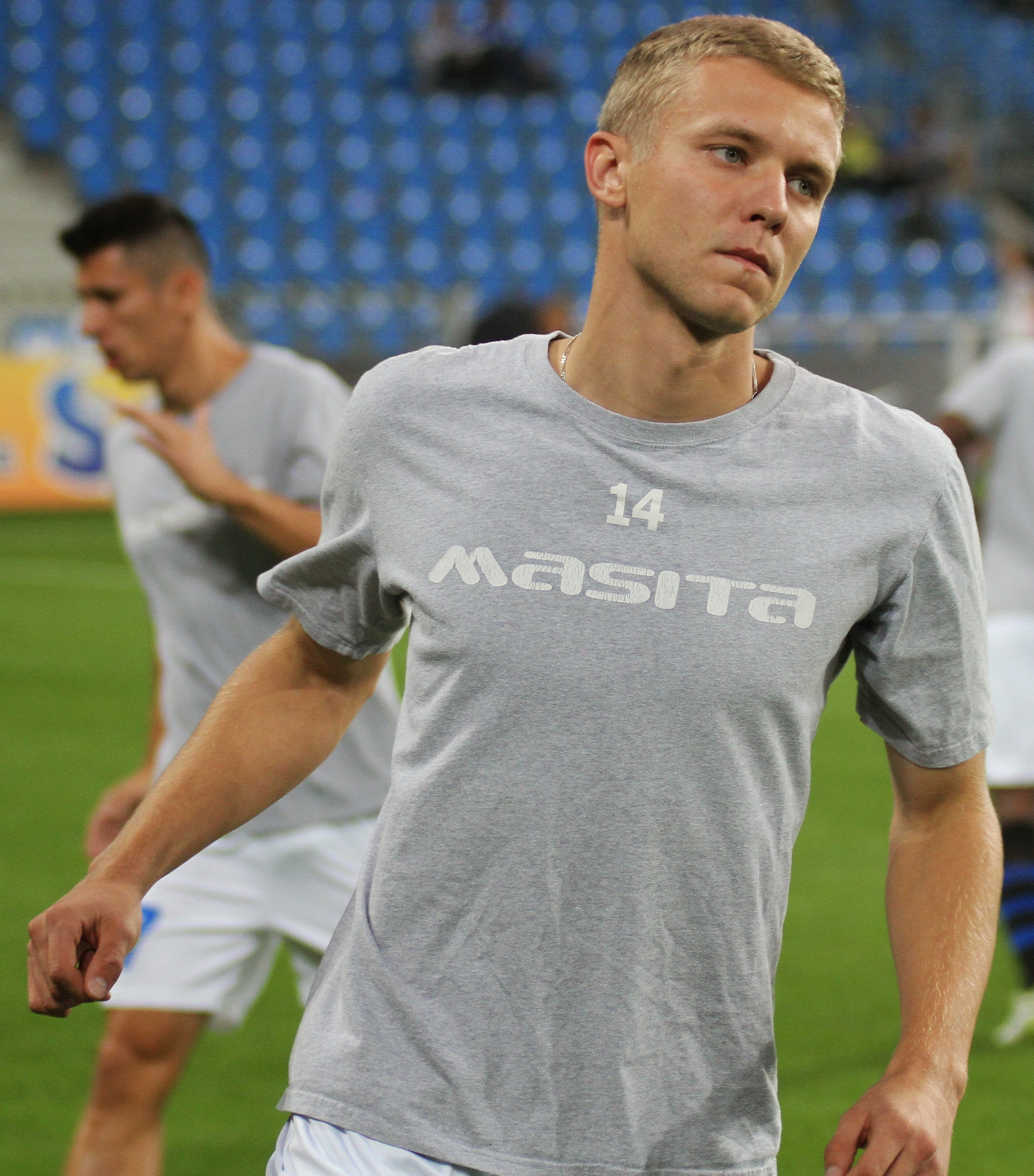
- Drygas with Zawisza Bydgoszcz in 2014

Personal information
- Full name: Kamil Drygas
- Date of birth: 7 September 1991 (age 35)
- Place of birth: Kępno, Poland
- Height: 1.84 m (6 ft 1/2 in)
- Position: Midfielder

Team information
- Current team: Miedź Legnica II

Youth career
- 2007: Marcinki Kępno
- 2007–2008: Amica Wronki
- 2008–2010: Lech Poznań

Senior career*
Years	Team	Apps	(Gls)
2010–2013	Lech Poznań	15	(0)
2012–2013	→ Zawisza Bydgoszcz (loan)	23	(8)
2013–2016	Zawisza Bydgoszcz	91	(21)
2016–2023	Pogoń Szczecin	176	(29)
2022	Pogoń Szczecin II	2	(2)
2023–2026	Miedź Legnica	97	(13)
2026–	Miedź Legnica II	0	(0)

International career
2010	Poland U20	3	(0)
2011	Poland U21	2	(0)
- * Club domestic league appearances and goals as of 15:13, 29 May 2026 (UTC)

Kamil Drygas (born 7 September 1991) is a Polish professional footballer who plays as a midfielder for III liga club Miedź Legnica II.

== Club career ==
Drygas began his career in Marcinki Kępno. Until 2007 he played in Amica Wronki.

In 2007, he signed for Lech Poznań. In 2008, he joined to Młoda Ekstraklasa team. In 2010, he was promoted to the senior team. Drygas made his debut in the 0–1 UEFA Champions League qualifications defeat against Sparta Prague on 27 June 2010.

He was then loaned out to Zawisza Bydgoszcz, whom he joined permanently in 2013. In January 2016, he signed a contract with Pogoń Szczecin, effective from July that year.

On 25 January 2023, Drygas moved to Miedź Legnica on a three-and-a-half-year contract, becoming Miedź's record signing.

On 18 June 2026, Drygas signed a new one-year contract with Miedź and joined their reserve team.

== International career ==
In August 2010, Drygas was selected to the Poland U20 team. On 3 September 2010 he played 45 minutes in a friendly match against Uzbekistan.

== Career statistics ==
As of match played 24 May 2026

Appearances and goals by club, season and competition
Club	Season	League			Polish Cup		Continental		Other		Total	
Club	Season	Division	Apps	Goals	Apps	Goals	Apps	Goals	Apps	Goals	Apps	Goals
Lech Poznań	2010–11	Ekstraklasa	4	0	1	0	5 (Note: Two appearances in UEFA Champions League, three appearances in UEFA Europa League)	0	—		10	0
Lech Poznań	2011–12	Ekstraklasa	9	0	2	0	—		—		11	0
Lech Poznań	2013–14	Ekstraklasa	2	0	0	0	1 (Note: Appearance(s) in UEFA Europa League)	0	—		3	0
Lech Poznań	Total		15	0	3	0	6	0	—		24	0
Zawisza Bydgoszcz (loan)	2012–13	I liga	23	8	2	0	—		—		25	8
Zawisza Bydgoszcz	2013–14	Ekstraklasa	29	4	5	3	—		—		34	7
Zawisza Bydgoszcz	2014–15	Ekstraklasa	33	4	1	0	2	1	1 (Note: Appearance in Polish Super Cup)	0	37	5
Zawisza Bydgoszcz	2015–16	I liga	29	13	6	3	—		—		35	16
Zawisza Bydgoszcz	Total		91	21	12	6	2	1	1	0	106	28
Pogoń Szczecin	2016–17	Ekstraklasa	32	3	4	2	—		—		36	5
Pogoń Szczecin	2017–18	Ekstraklasa	33	5	2	0	—		—		35	5
Pogoń Szczecin	2018–19	Ekstraklasa	35	10	1	0	—		—		36	10
Pogoń Szczecin	2019–20	Ekstraklasa	13	0	—		—		—		13	0
Pogoń Szczecin	2020–21	Ekstraklasa	27	3	3	3	—		—		30	6
Pogoń Szczecin	2021–22	Ekstraklasa	24	7	0	0	2 (Note: Appearances in UEFA Europa Conference League)	0	—		26	7
Pogoń Szczecin	2022–23	Ekstraklasa	12	1	1	0	4	2	—		17	3
Pogoń Szczecin	Total		176	29	11	5	6	2	—		193	36
Pogoń Szczecin II	2022–23	III liga, gr. II	2	2	—		—		—		2	2
Miedź Legnica	2022–23	Ekstraklasa	17	1	—		—		—		17	1
Miedź Legnica	2023–24	I liga	25	9	1	0	—		—		26	9
Miedź Legnica	2024–25	I liga	29	3	2	0	—		2 (Note: Appearances in I liga promotion play-offs)	0	33	3
Miedź Legnica	2025–26	I liga	24	0	1	0	—		—		25	0
Miedź Legnica	Total		95	13	4	0	—		2	0	101	13
Miedź Legnica II	2026–27	III liga, gr. III	0	0	—		—		—		0	0
Career total			402	75	32	12	14	3	3	0	451	90

== Honours ==
Zawisza Bydgoszcz

- I liga: 2012–13
- Polish Cup: 2013–14
- Polish Super Cup: 2014

Individual

- Ekstraklasa Player of the Month: August 2016
