= Bartosz Ława =

Polish footballer (born 1979)

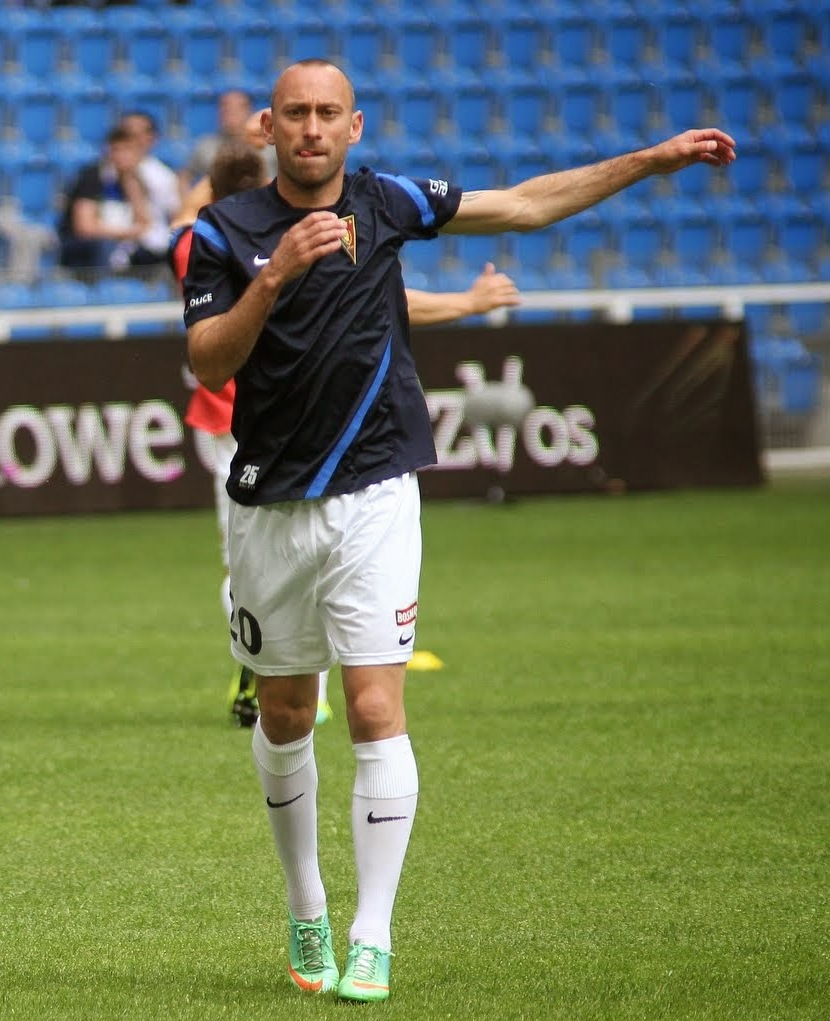
- Ława with Pogoń Szczecin in 2014

Personal information
- Full name: Bartosz Ława
- Date of birth: 26 February 1979 (age 47)
- Place of birth: Trzebiatów, Poland
- Height: 1.76 m (5 ft 9 1/2 in)
- Position: Midfielder

Senior career*
Years	Team	Apps	(Gls)
1996–2002	Pogoń Szczecin	48	(3)
2002–2003	Amica Wronki	14	(0)
2004	Widzew Łódź	11	(1)
2004–2010	Arka Gdynia	151	(21)
2010–2014	Pogoń Szczecin	104	(14)
2014–2015	Arka Gdynia	31	(3)
2015–2017	Vineta Wolin	35	(7)
2017–2021	Chemik Police		
2021–2023	Pogoń Szczecin II	51	(2)
2023–2024	Penkuner SV Rot-Weiß	2	(0)
- * Club domestic league appearances and goals

Bartosz Ława (Polish pronunciation: [ˈbar.tɔʂ ˈwa.va]; born 26 February 1979) is a Polish former professional footballer who played as a midfielder.

== Career ==
In the past, Ława played for Amica Wronki, Widzew Łódź and Arka Gdynia.

== Honours ==
Vineta Wolin

- III liga Pomeranian–West Pomeranian: 2015–16

Chemik Police

- IV liga West Pomerania: 2018–19
- Regional league Szczecin: 2017–18
- Polish Cup (Pomerania regionals): 2018–19

Pogoń Szczecin II

- Polish Cup (Pomerania regionals): 2021–22, 2022–23
