= Sebastian Ziajka =

Polish footballer

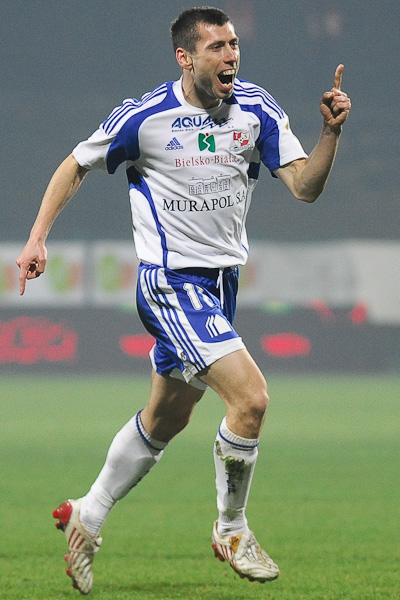
- Sebastian Ziajka in 2011

Personal information
- Full name: Sebastian Ziajka
- Date of birth: 15 December 1982 (age 43)
- Place of birth: Kostrzyn nad Odrą, Poland
- Height: 1.82 m (5 ft 11 1/2 in)
- Position: Midfielder

Senior career*
Years	Team	Apps	(Gls)
2002–2004	Celuloza Kostrzyn		
2004–2008	Miedź Legnica		
2008–2013	Podbeskidzie Bielsko-Biała	73	(6)
2009–2010	→ Dolcan Ząbki (loan)	33	(0)
2013–2015	Zawisza Bydgoszcz	78	(4)
2015–2017	Termalica Bruk-Bet Nieciecza	31	(0)
2017–2019	1. FC Frankfurt	25	(1)
- * Club domestic league appearances and goals

Sebastian Ziajka (born 15 December 1982) is a Polish former professional footballer who played as a midfielder.

== Career ==
=== Club ===
He joined Podbeskidzie Bielsko-Biała in 2008. For the 2009–10 season, he was loaned to Dolcan Ząbki on a one-year deal. He returned to Podbeskidzie in the summer of 2010.

== Honours ==
Zawisza Bydgoszcz

- I liga: 2012–13
- Polish Cup: 2013–14
- Polish Super Cup: 2014
