= Stadion Miejski im. Zdzisława Krzyszkowiaka =

Stadium in Poland

Coordinates: 53°08′44″N 18°01′14″E

Zdzisław Krzyszkowiak Municipal Stadium
- Zawisza Stadium
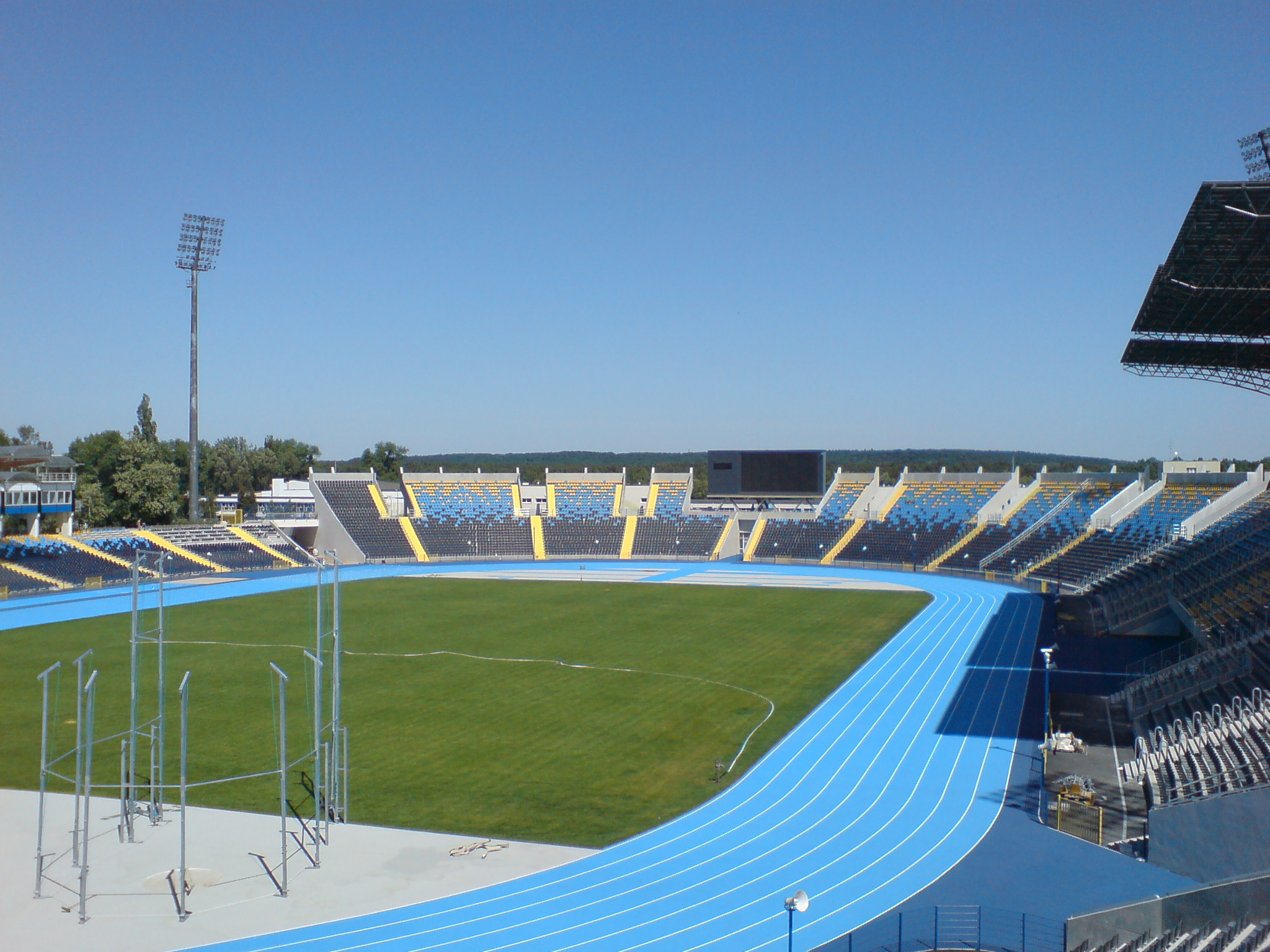
- Interactive map of Zdzisław Krzyszkowiak Municipal Stadium
- Location: Gdańska Street, Bydgoszcz, Poland
- Owner: Bydgoszcz City
- Operator: Zawisza Bydgoszcz
- Capacity: 20,187
- Surface: Grass

Tenants
- Zawisza Bydgoszcz: Major sporting events hosted; 2017 UEFA Under-21 Euro 2019 FIFA U-20 World Cup

The Zdzisław Krzyszkowiak Municipal Stadium (Polish: Stadion Miejski im. Zdzisława Krzyszkowiaka) is a multi-use stadium in Bydgoszcz, Poland. It was completed in 1960 with a capacity of about 35,944 on wooden benches. The stadium was completely rebuilt in 2007–2008, and the current seating capacity is 20,187 people. It is currently used for football matches and track and field events. The stadium is named after Polish Olympic gold medal-winning runner Zdzisław Krzyszkowiak.

== Athletics ==
Zdzisław Krzyszkowiak Stadium has hosted several national athletic competitions:

- 14 of 94 all Polish national senior athletics championships (last in 2016)

and at the international level:

- 1999 - World Youth Championships
- 2000 - European Cup First League
- 2001 - European Relay Festival
- 2003 - European Athletics U23 Championships
- 2004 - European Cup
- 2008, 2016 - World Junior Championships in Athletics
- 2017 - European Athletics U23 Championships
- 2019 - European Team Championships
- 2021 - World Para Athletics European Championships

In addition, it annually hosts the Irena Szewińska Memorial part of World Athletics Continental Tour Bronze.

== Football ==
It has hosted 10 international matches of the Poland national football team. In 2017, the stadium was one of the venues of the 2017 UEFA European Under-21 Championship. In 2019, it was one of the venues of the 2019 FIFA U-20 World Cup.

What	No	Date	Score	Opponent	Goals for Poland
Friendly match	253.	15 October 1972	3–0 (2–0)	Czechoslovakia	Kazimierz Deyna 2, Robert Gadocha
Friendly match	370.	24 May 1981	3–0 (2–0)	Republic of Ireland	Andrzej Iwan, O’Leary (OG), Roman Ogaza
Friendly match	428.	7 October 1986	2–2 (1–0)	North Korea	Ryszard Tarasiewicz, Jan Karaś
Friendly match	438.	2 September 1987	3–1 (3–0)	Romania	Marek Leśniak 2, Andrzej Rudy
Friendly match	597.	25 April 2001	1–1 (0–0)	Scotland	Radosław Kałużny
Friendly match	608.	17 April 2002	1–2 (0–2)	Romania	Tomasz Hajto
Friendly match	636.	28 April 2004	0–0 (0–0)	Republic of Ireland	-
UEFA Euro 2008 qualifying	670.	2 September 2006	1–3 (0–0)	Finland	Łukasz Garguła
Friendly match	-	12 August 2009	2–0 (2–0)	Greece	Ludovic Obraniak 2
Friendly match	-	18 November 2009	1–0 (1–0)	Canada	Maciej Rybus

== Gallery ==
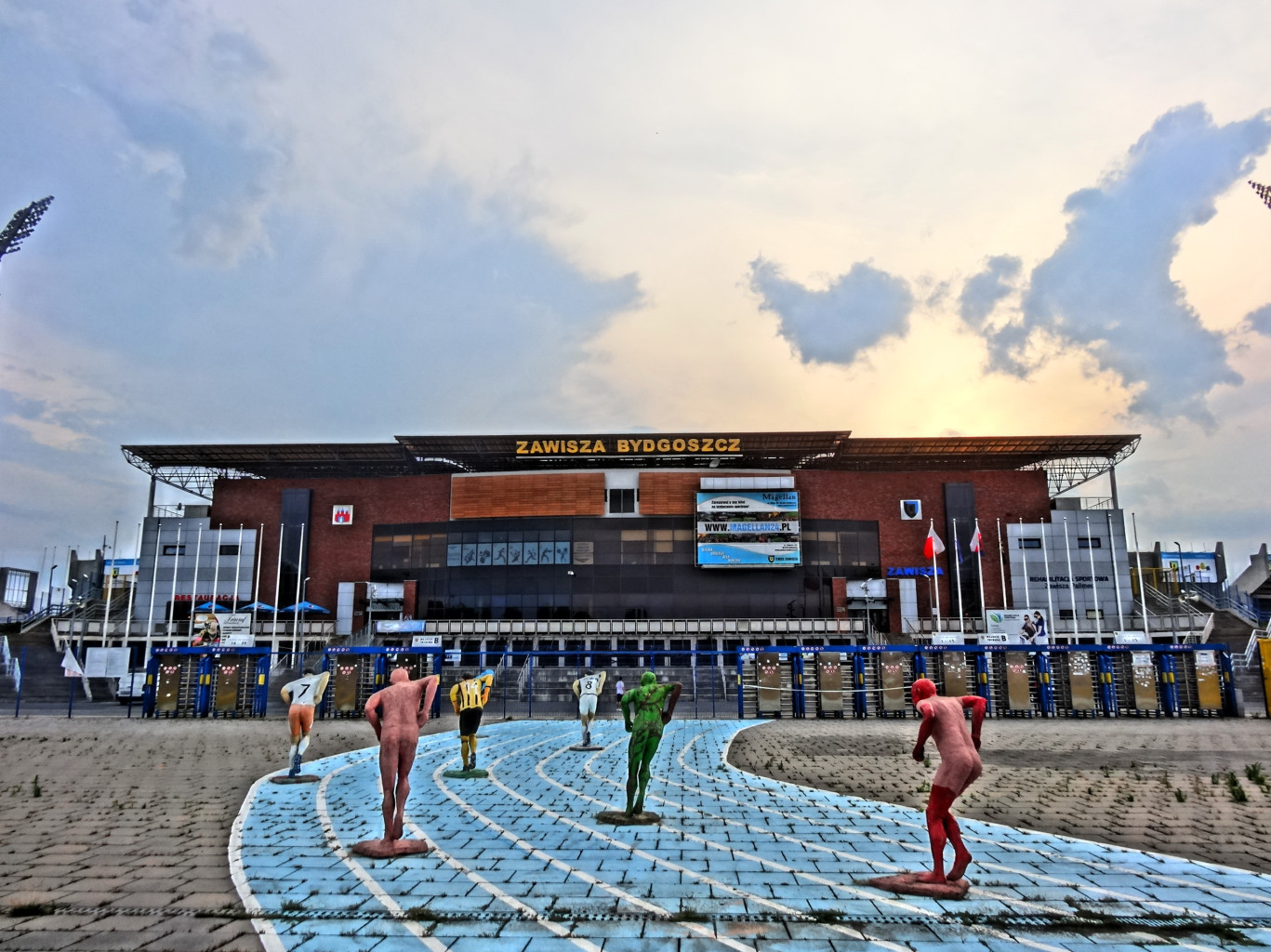
Main entrance on Gdańska Street

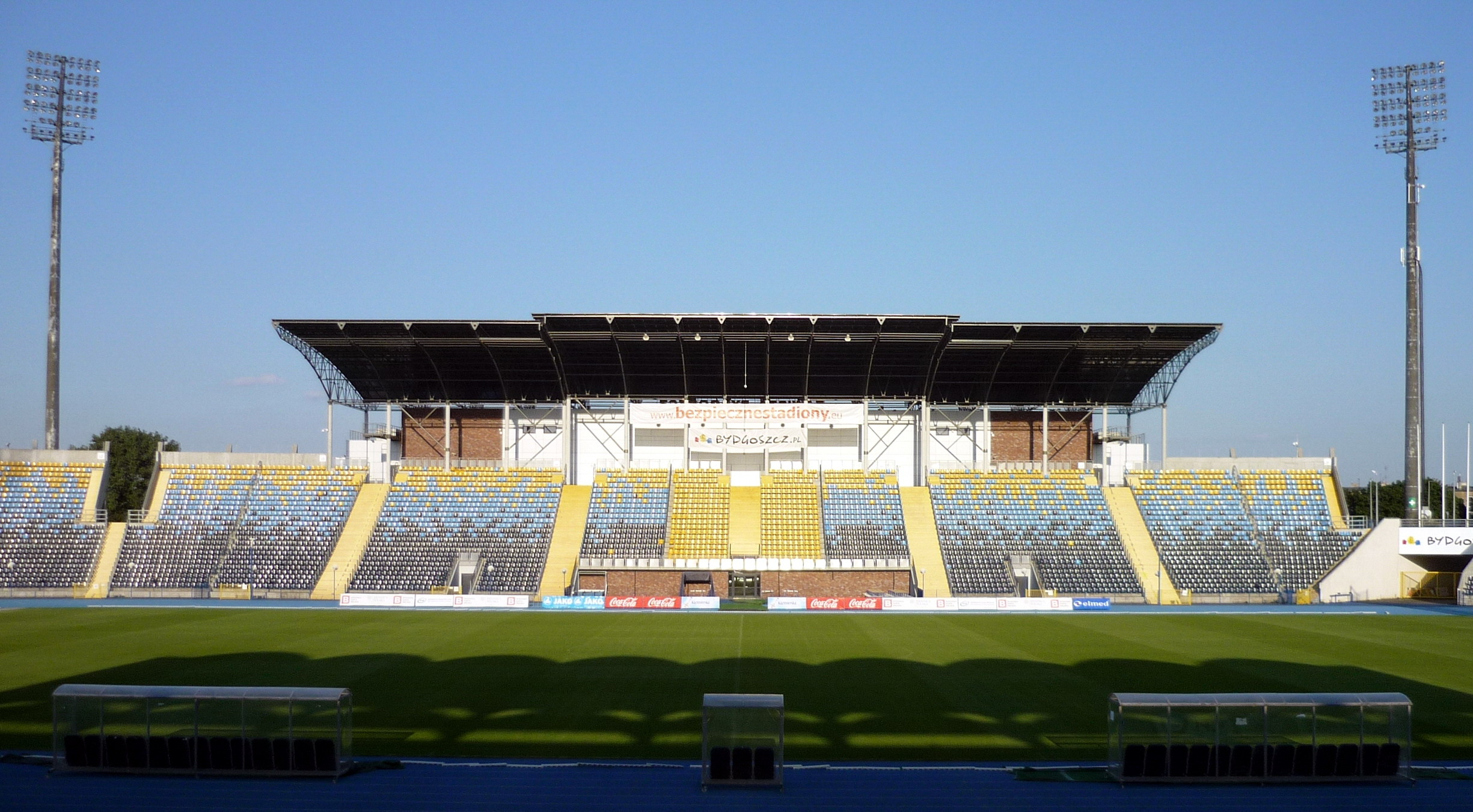
Tribune B

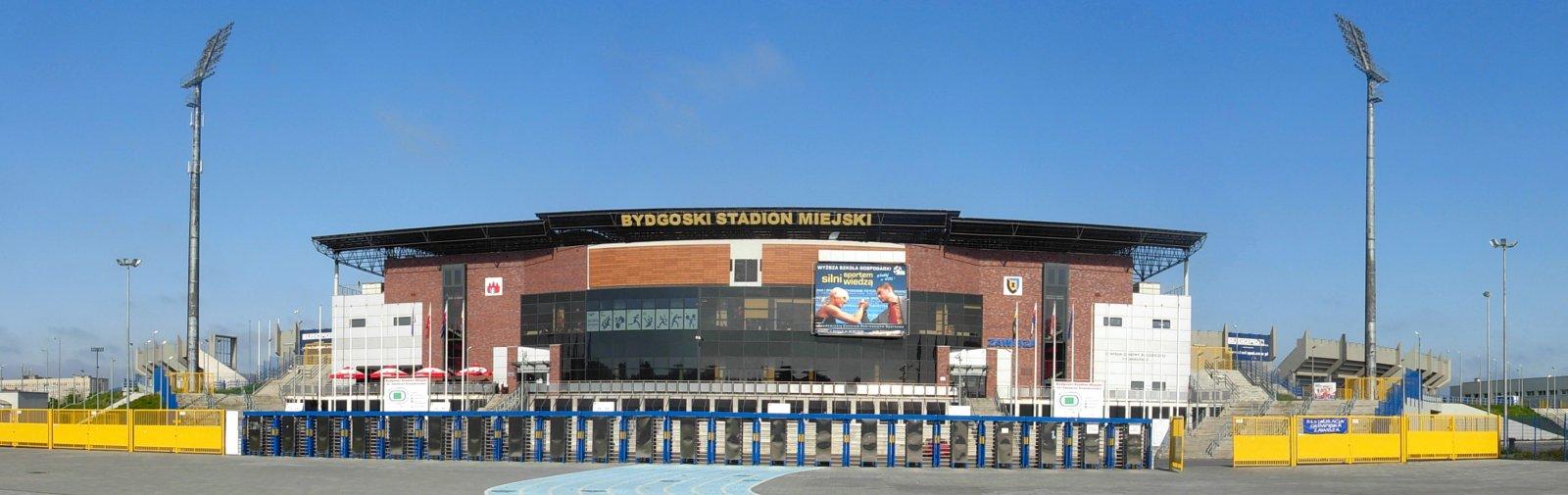
Main entrance, and the club building

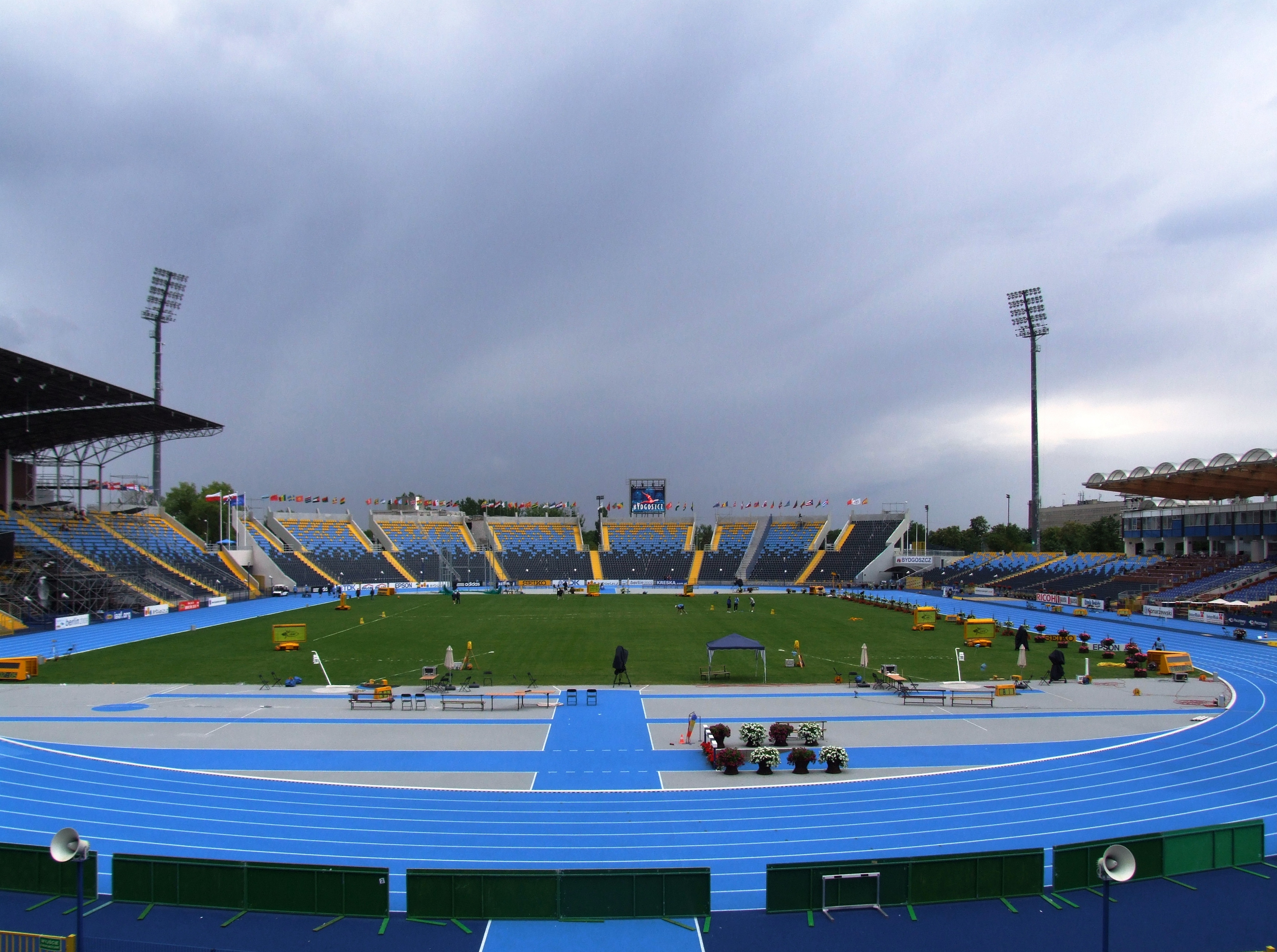
Junior Athletics World Championships 2008

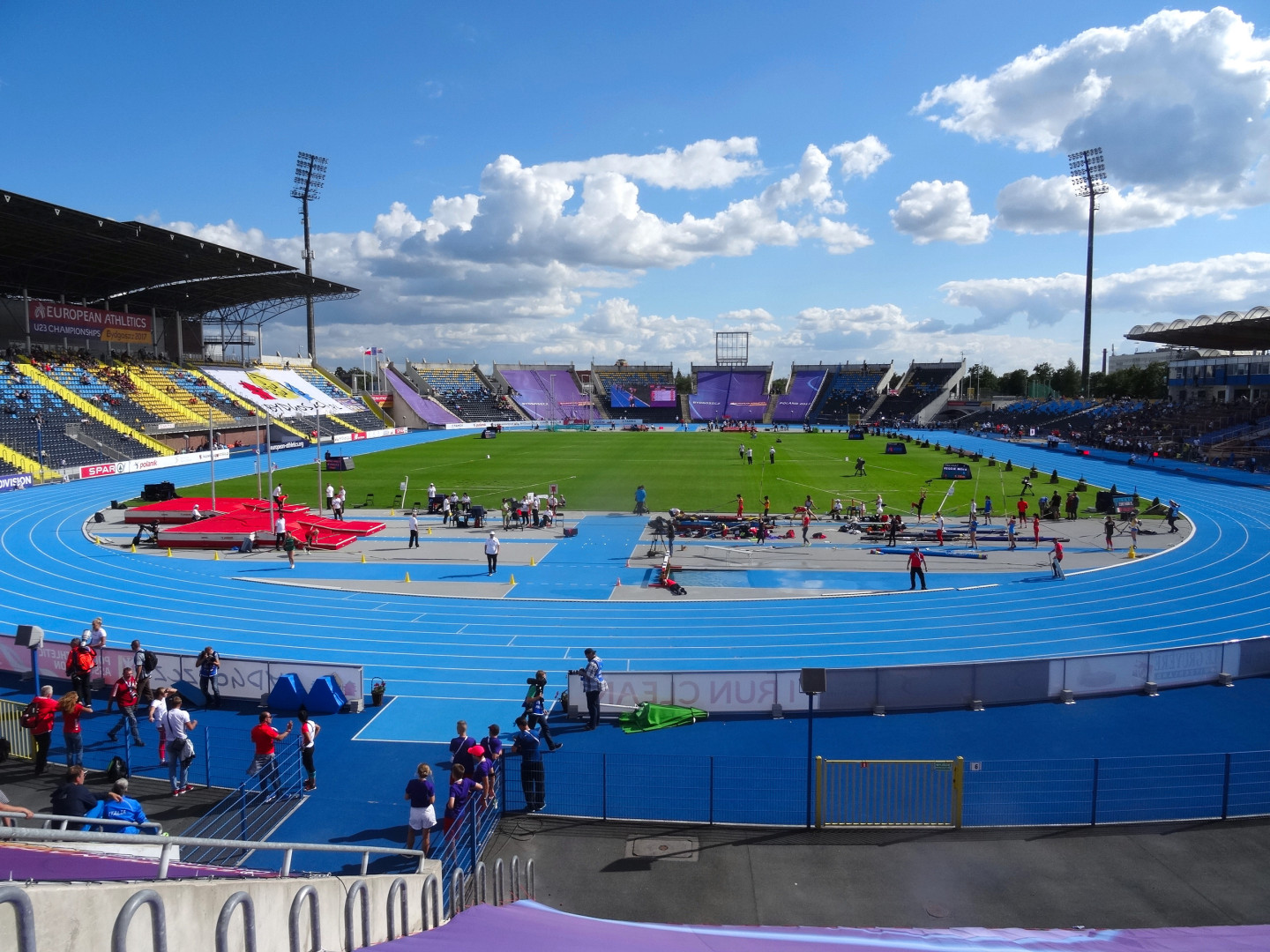
U23 European Athletics Championships 2017

== See also ==
- Józef Piłsudski Stadium (Bydgoszcz)
- List of football stadiums in Poland
- Lists of stadiums
