= Maciej Korzym =

Polish footballer

Personal information
- Full name: Maciej Korzym
- Date of birth: 2 May 1988 (age 38)
- Place of birth: Nowy Sącz, Poland
- Height: 1.80 m (5 ft 11 in)
- Position: Forward

Team information
- Current team: Barciczanka Barcice (manager)

Youth career
- Start Nowy Sącz
- 2002–2003: Sandecja Nowy Sącz
- 2003: Lech Poznań

Senior career*
Years	Team	Apps	(Gls)
2003–2004	Sandecja Nowy Sącz		
2004–2010	Legia Warsaw	24	(3)
2005–2006	→ Odra Wodzisław (loan)	25	(3)
2008–2009	→ Odra Wodzisław (loan)	28	(3)
2009–2010	→ GKS Bełchatów (loan)	20	(3)
2010–2014	Korona Kielce	97	(20)
2014–2015	Podbeskidzie Bielsko-Biała	22	(4)
2015–2016	Górnik Zabrze	16	(2)
2016–2020	Sandecja Nowy Sącz	81	(10)
2021	Poprad Muszyna	12	(5)
2021–2023	Barciczanka Barcice	51	(39)
2024	Barciczanka Barcice	12	(1)
2024–2025	Dunajec Nowy Sącz	14	(2)

International career
2009	Poland U21	2	(2)

Managerial career
- 2025–: Barciczanka Barcice
- * Club domestic league appearances and goals

Maciej Korzym (born 2 May 1988) is a Polish former professional footballer who played as a forward. He is currently in charge of regional league club Barciczanka Barcice. He briefly retired in 2023 to take on the role of sporting director at Sandecja Nowy Sącz, which he held from June until December that year.

== Career ==
Korzym played for the Poland U21s in 2009.

== Managerial statistics ==
Managerial record by team and tenure
Team	From	To	Record							
Team	From	To	G	W	D	L	GF	GA	GD	Win %
Barciczanka Barcice	9 December 2025	Present	0	0	0	0	0	0	+0	—
Total			0	0	0	0	0	0	+0	—

== Honours ==
Legia Warsaw

- Polish Cup: 2007–08

Sandecja Nowy Sącz

- I liga: 2016–17

Barciczanka Barcice

- Regional league Nowy Sącz I: 2021–22
