= Paweł Oleksy =

Polish footballer

Personal information
- Full name: Paweł Oleksy
- Date of birth: 1 April 1991 (age 35)
- Place of birth: Kamienna Góra, Poland
- Height: 1.83 m (6 ft 0 in)
- Position: Left-back

Team information
- Current team: KS Wiązownica

Youth career
- Skalnik Czarny Bór
- 2006: Górnik/Zagłębie Wałbrzych
- 2007: Zagłębie Lubin

Senior career*
Years	Team	Apps	(Gls)
2007–2010	Zagłębie Lubin (ME)	12	(0)
2008	Zagłębie Lubin II	11	(1)
2009–2015	Zagłębie Lubin	21	(0)
2010	→ Chrobry Głogów (loan)	8	(0)
2011	→ Górnik Polkowice (loan)	8	(0)
2011–2012	→ Zawisza Bydgoszcz (loan)	29	(2)
2012–2013	→ Piast Gliwice (loan)	23	(1)
2014	→ Arka Gdynia (loan)	5	(1)
2015–2017	Ruch Chorzów	55	(4)
2017–2019	Podbeskidzie	41	(4)
2019–2021	Bruk-Bet Termalica	5	(0)
2020–2021	→ Chrobry Głogów (loan)	18	(1)
2021–2025	Stal Rzeszów	78	(5)
2025–2026	Pogoń-Sokół Lubaczów	15	(3)
2026–	KS Wiązownica	0	(0)

International career
2009–2010	Poland U19	11	(0)
2011	Poland U21	5	(0)
- * Club domestic league appearances and goals as of 19:38, 7 February 2026 (UTC)

Paweł Oleksy (born 1 April 1991) is a Polish professional footballer who plays as a left-back for IV liga Subcarpathia club KS Wiązownica.

== Club career ==
He is a trainee of Skalnik Czarny Bór. In the summer 2010, he was loaned to Chrobry Głogów from Zagłębie Lubin. In January 2011, he was loaned to Górnik Polkowice on a one-year deal.

In July 2011, he was loaned to Zawisza Bydgoszcz.

On 22 September 2020, he returned to Chrobry Głogów 10 years after his first season at the club, on loan for the 2020–21 season.

== International career ==
He was part of the Poland national under-19 team. In 2011, he took part in the 2013 UEFA Euro Under-21 qualifying campaign with the Poland U21s.

== Honours ==
Stal Rzeszów

- II liga: 2021–22
