= Łukasz Skrzyński =

Polish footballer (born 1978)

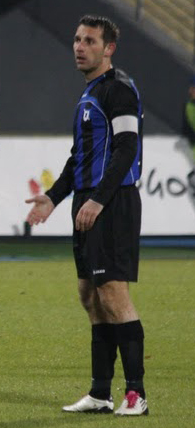
- Skrzyński in 2011.

Personal information
- Full name: Łukasz Skrzyński
- Date of birth: 31 January 1978 (age 48)
- Place of birth: Skawina, Poland
- Height: 1.87 m (6 ft 2 in)
- Position: Centre-back

Team information
- Current team: Cracovia (academy recruitment and development coordinator)

Youth career
- –1995: Wisła Kraków

Senior career*
Years	Team	Apps	(Gls)
1995–2000	Wisła Kraków	0	(0)
1998–1999	→ Cracovia (loan)	15	(1)
1999–2000	→ Korona Kielce (loan)	10	(0)
2000–2002	Proszowianka Proszowice		
2002–2008	Cracovia	151	(10)
2008–2010	Polonia Warsaw	46	(0)
2011–2014	Zawisza Bydgoszcz	74	(2)

Managerial career
- 2020–2021: Dalin Myślenice
- 2021–2024: Wiślanie Skawina
- * Club domestic league appearances and goals

Łukasz Skrzyński (born 31 January 1978) is a Polish professional football manager and former player who played as a centre-back. He currently works for Ekstraklasa club Cracovia's academy as a coordinator.

== Career ==
In July 2011, Skrzyński joined Zawisza Bydgoszcz.

== Post-playing career ==
After retiring in 2014, Skrzyński was appointed sporting director of his last club, Zawisza. He held that role until the club's dissolvement in June 2016.

From 2020 until 2021, he took on managerial positions at lower division teams Dalin Myślenice and Wiślanie Skawina, before becoming the vice-chairman and sporting director of Sandecja Nowy Sącz, where he remained until 19 April 2023. He and Wiślanie agreed to part ways on 19 August 2024.

On 26 January 2026, Skrzyński returned to Cracovia and joined their academy as a recruitment and development coordinator.

== Managerial statistics ==
As of match played 16 August 2024

Managerial record by team and tenure
Team	From	To	Record							
Team	From	To	G	W	D	L	GF	GA	GD	Win %
Dalin Myślenice	2 January 2020	7 July 2021	30	15	5	10	59	47	+12	50.00
Wiślanie Skawina	10 July 2021	19 August 2024	117	77	17	23	290	120	+170	65.81
Total			147	92	22	33	349	167	+182	62.59

== Honours ==
=== Player ===
Zawisza Bydgoszcz

- I liga: 2012–13
- Polish Cup: 2013–14

=== Manager ===
Dalin Myślenice

- Polish Cup (Myślenice regionals): 2020–21

Wiślanie Jaśkowice

- IV liga Lesser Poland: 2022–23
- Polish Cup (Kraków regionals): 2023–24
