= Rafał Kosznik =

Polish footballer (born 1983)

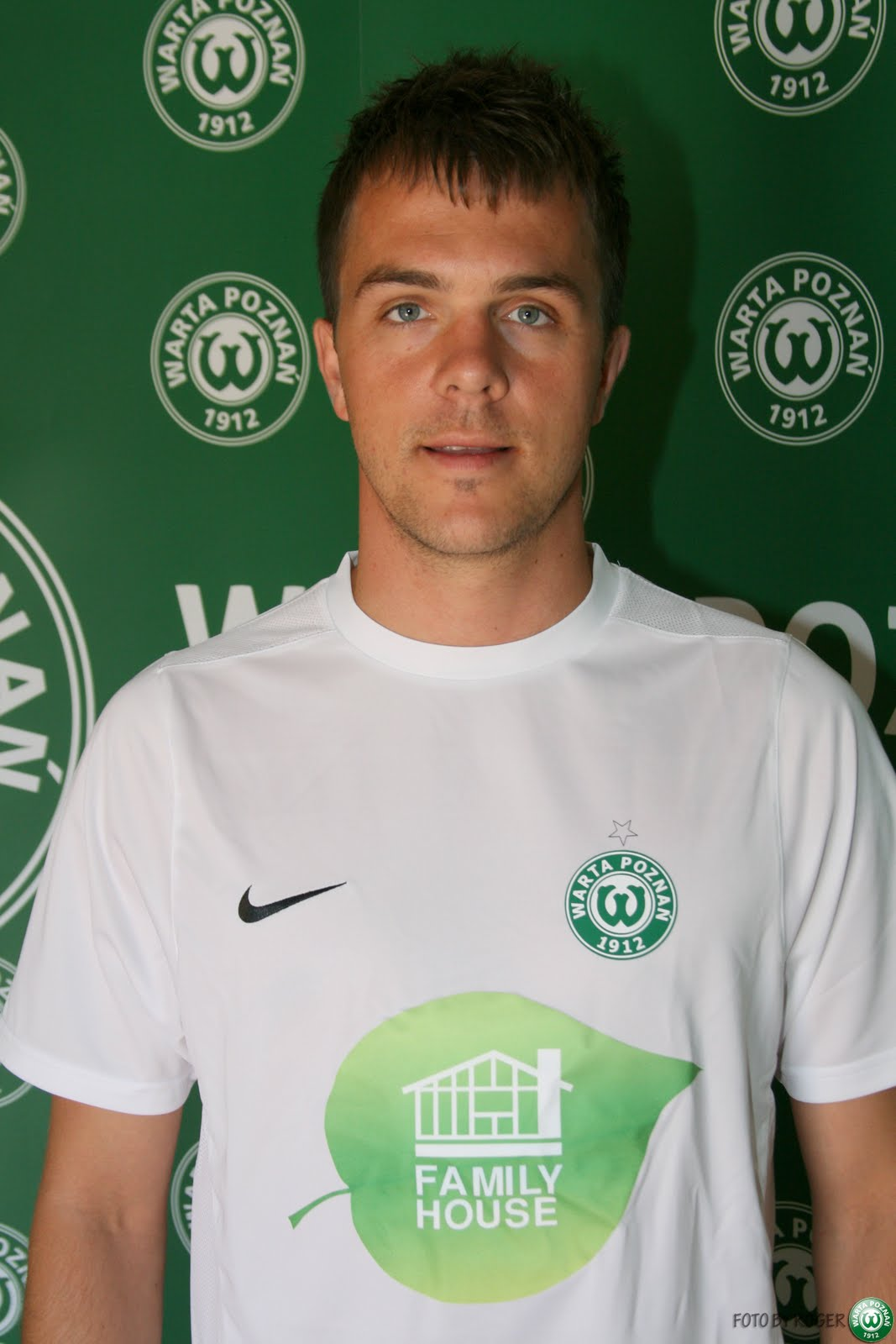
- Kosznik with Warta Poznań in 2011

Personal information
- Date of birth: 17 September 1983 (age 43)
- Place of birth: Kościerzyna, Poland
- Height: 1.83 m (6 ft 0 in)
- Position: Left-back

Team information
- Current team: Tylko Lechia Gdańsk
- Number: 4

Senior career*
Years	Team	Apps	(Gls)
2001–2005	Kaszubia Kościerzyna		
2006–2008	Lechia Gdańsk	69	(1)
2009	Omonia Nicosia	0	(0)
2010	Lechia Gdańsk	5	(0)
2010–2012	Warta Poznań	55	(0)
2013	GKS Bełchatów	14	(0)
2013–2017	Górnik Zabrze	94	(8)
2017–2018	Górnik Łęczna	27	(1)
2018–2023	Radunia Stężyca	108	(8)
2023–	Tylko Lechia Gdańsk	62	(17)

International career
2013	Poland	1	(0)
- * Club domestic league appearances and goals as of 17:40, 30 June 2026 (UTC)

Rafał Kosznik (born 17 December 1983) is a Polish professional footballer who plays as a left-back for regional league club Tylko Lechia Gdańsk.

== Honours ==
Kaszubia Kościerzyna

- IV liga Pomerania: 2002–03

Lechia Gdańsk

- II liga: 2007–08

Radunia Stężyca

- III liga, group II: 2020–21

Tylko Lechia Gdańsk

- Klasa B Gdańsk II: 2023–24
