= Marek Sokołowski =

Polish footballer

Personal information
- Full name: Marek Sokołowski
- Date of birth: 11 March 1978 (age 48)
- Place of birth: Sławno, Poland
- Height: 1.81 m (5 ft 11 1/2 in)
- Position: Midfielder

Senior career*
Years	Team	Apps	(Gls)
1999–2000	BBTS Bielsko-Biała		
2001–2002	KSZO Ostrowiec	35	(3)
2003	Podbeskidzie Bielsko-Biała	7	(0)
2003–2004	Odra Wodzisław Śląski	22	(3)
2004–2008	Dyskobolia Grodzisk	80	(3)
2005	→ Obra Kościan (loan)		
2008–2010	Polonia Warsaw	38	(2)
2011–2017	Podbeskidzie Bielsko-Biała	167	(16)

Managerial career
- 2024: Podbeskidzie II
- * Club domestic league appearances and goals

Marek Sokołowski (born 11 March 1978) is a Polish former professional footballer who played as a midfielder or a full-back.

== Career ==
=== Club ===
He joined Podbeskidzie Bielsko-Biała in 2010.

== Honours ==
=== Player ===
Dyskobolia Grodzisk

- Polish Cup: 2006–07
- Ekstraklasa Cup: 2006–07, 2007–08

=== Manager ===
Podbeskidzie II

- Polish Cup (Silesia regionals): 2023–24
