= Marcin Malinowski =

Polish footballer

Personal information
- Full name: Marcin Malinowski
- Date of birth: 6 November 1975 (age 50)
- Place of birth: Wodzisław Śląski, Poland
- Height: 1.79 m (5 ft 10 1/2 in)
- Position: Midfielder

Youth career
- –1991: ROW Rybnik

Senior career*
Years	Team	Apps	(Gls)
1991–1994	Gwarek Zabrze		
1994–1996	Polonia Bytom	63	(2)
1997–2002	Odra Wodzisław Śląski	155	(6)
2002–2004	Ruch Chorzów	56	(2)
2004–2010	Odra Wodzisław Śląski	148	(4)
2010–2015	Ruch Chorzów	130	(3)
2015	Poroniec Poronin	13	(0)
2016–2018	Odra Centrum Wodzisław Śląski	83	(4)
2019	Unia Turza Śląska	24	(0)
2020	LKS Krzyżanowice	8	(0)
2024	LKS Raszczyce	3	(0)
2024	Unia Turza Śląska II	0	(0)

Managerial career
- 2019: Unia Turza Śląska (player-manager)
- 2019–2020: Zagłębie Sosnowiec (assistant)
- 2020: LKS Krzyżanowice (player-manager)
- 2020–2022: Sandecja Nowy Sącz (assistant)
- 2022–2023: Zagłębie Sosnowiec (assistant)
- 2023: Zagłębie Sosnowiec
- 2023–2024: Zagłębie Sosnowiec (assistant)
- 2024: Unia Turza Śląska U17
- 2024: Unia Turza Śląska II
- 2024–2025: Unia Turza Śląska (assistant)
- 2025: Unia Turza Śląska
- * Club domestic league appearances and goals

Marcin Malinowski (born 6 November 1975) is a Polish professional football manager and former player who played as a midfielder. He was most recently in currently in charge of Unia Turza Śląska.

From 1997 to 2015, he made 458 Ekstraklasa appearances for Odra Wodzisław and Ruch Chorzów, the second highest number of appearances in the league's history.

He began his career in Gwarek Zabrze, then moved to Polonia Bytom. In 1997, he signed a contract with Polish top division side Odra Wodzisław. The club won third place in the league in 1997 and played in UEFA Cup.

In 2002, he moved to Ruch Chorzów. He returned to Odra Wodzisław in 2004, was later appointed club captain, and played there until the club was relegated to the I liga in 2010. For Odra, he played 303 matches and scored 10 goals across 12 seasons in Ekstraklasa. In 2010, he rejoined Ruch Chorzów.

== Managerial statistics ==
As of match played 7 June 2025

Managerial record by team and tenure
Team	From	To	Record							
Team	From	To	G	W	D	L	GF	GA	GD	Win %
Unia Turza Śląska (player-manager)	8 January 2019	8 October 2019	29	23	3	3	90	23	+67	79.31
LKS Krzyżanowice (player-manager)	22 August 2020	11 November 2020	13	9	2	2	27	13	+14	69.23
Zagłębie Sosnowiec	12 April 2023	22 August 2023	13	4	4	5	11	12	−1	30.77
Unia Turza Śląska II	1 August 2024	28 October 2024	13	8	1	4	44	22	+22	61.54
Unia Turza Śląska	17 April 2025	22 June 2025	8	1	0	7	6	22	−16	12.50
Total			76	45	10	21	178	92	+86	59.21

== Honours ==
=== Player ===
Odra Centrum Wodzisław Śląski

- Regional league Katowice III: 2016–17
- Klasa A Rybnik: 2015–16

Individual

- Ekstraklasa Goal of the Season: 2013–14
