= 2016–17 Legia Warsaw season =

Legia Warsaw
2016–17 season
- Manager: Besnik Hasi (until 20 September); Aleksandar Vuković (caretaker, from 20 September to 24 September); Jacek Magiera (from 24 September)
- Stadium: Polish Army Stadium
- Ekstraklasa: 1st
- Polish Cup: Round of 32
- Polish Super Cup: Runners-up
- UEFA Champions League: Group stage
- UEFA Europa League: Round of 32
| Home colours | Away colours |

The 2016–17 season was Legia Warsaw's 80th season in the Ekstraklasa and 100th year in existence as a football club. In addition to the domestic league, Legia Warsaw participated in this season's editions of the Polish Cup, the Polish Super Cup, the UEFA Champions League and the UEFA Europa League.

== Squad ==
Note: Flags indicate national team as defined under FIFA eligibility rules; some limited exceptions apply. Players may hold more than one non-FIFA nationality.

| No. | Pos. | Nation | Player |
|---|---|---|---|
| 1 | GK | POL | Arkadiusz Malarz |
| 2 | DF | POL | Michał Pazdan |
| 3 | MF | POL | Tomasz Jodłowiec |
| 4 | DF | POL | Jakub Czerwiński |
| 5 | DF | POL | Maciej Dąbrowski |
| 6 | MF | BRA | Guilherme |
| 8 | MF | BEL | Vadis Odjidja-Ofoe |
| 9 | MF | GEO | Valeri Qazaishvili |
| 14 | DF | CZE | Adam Hloušek |
| 15 | MF | POL | Michał Kopczyński |
| 18 | MF | POL | Michał Kucharczyk |
| 21 | MF | HUN | Dominik Nagy |
| 22 | MF | FIN | Kasper Hämäläinen |

| No. | Pos. | Nation | Player |
|---|---|---|---|
| 23 | DF | POL | Mateusz Hołownia |
| 24 | FW | CZE | Tomáš Necid |
| 25 | DF | POL | Jakub Rzeźniczak |
| 26 | FW | CRO | Sandro Kulenović |
| 27 | FW | NGR | Daniel Chima Chukwu |
| 28 | DF | POL | Łukasz Broź |
| 30 | GK | POL | Radosław Majecki |
| 32 | MF | SRB | Miroslav Radović |
| 33 | GK | POL | Radosław Cierzniak |
| 42 | MF | POL | Bartłomiej Urbański |
| 53 | MF | POL | Sebastian Szymański |
| 55 | DF | POL | Artur Jędrzejczyk |
| 75 | MF | FRA | Thibault Moulin |

== Competitions ==
=== Overview ===
| Competition | First match | Last match | Starting round | Final position | Record | | | | | | | |
| Competition | First match | Last match | Starting round | Final position | Pld | W | D | L | GF | GA | GD | Win % |
|---|---|---|---|---|---|---|---|---|---|---|---|---|
| Ekstraklasa | 16 July 2016 | 4 June 2017 | Matchday 1 | Winners | 37 | 21 | 10 | 6 | 70 | 31 | +39 | 56.76 |
| Polish Cup | 10 August 2016 | 10 August 2016 | Round of 32 | Round of 32 | 1 | 0 | 0 | 1 | 2 | 3 | −1 | 0.00 |
| Polish Super Cup | 7 July 2016 | | Final | Runners-up | 1 | 0 | 0 | 1 | 1 | 4 | −3 | 0.00 |
| UEFA Champions League | 12 July 2016 | 7 December 2016 | Second qualifying round | Group stage | 12 | 4 | 4 | 4 | 16 | 26 | −10 | 33.33 |
| UEFA Europa League | 16 February 2017 | 23 February 2017 | Round of 32 | Round of 32 | 2 | 0 | 1 | 1 | 0 | 1 | −1 | 0.00 |
| Total | | | | | 53 | 25 | 15 | 13 | 89 | 65 | +24 | 47.17 |

Source: Competitions

=== Polish Super Cup ===
As the previous season's Ekstraklasa and Polish Cup winners, Legia Warsaw faced cup runners-up Lech Poznań in the 2016 Polish Super Cup.

| 7 July 2016 Final | Legia Warsaw | 1–4 | Lech Poznań | Warsaw |
| 17:30 CEST (UTC+2) | Guilherme (yellow card) 28', (goal) 36'; Broź (yellow card) 35'; Makowski (yellow card) 58' | Report | Makuszewski 23'; Bille (yellow card) 40'; Trałka (yellow card) 50'; Gajos (yellow card) 57'; Nielsen 65'; Formella 90+1', 90+3' | Stadium: Polish Army Stadium; Referee: Krzysztof Jakubik |

=== Ekstraklasa ===
==== Results summary ====
| Overall | | | | | | | | Home | | | | | | Away | | | | | |
| Pld | W | D | L | GF | GA | GD | Pts | W | D | L | GF | GA | GD | W | D | L | GF | GA | GD |
|---|---|---|---|---|---|---|---|---|---|---|---|---|---|---|---|---|---|---|---|
| 37 | 21 | 10 | 6 | 70 | 31 | +39 | 73 | 8 | 8 | 3 | 32 | 15 | +17 | 13 | 2 | 3 | 38 | 16 | +22 |

Source: Competitions

==== Regular season ====
===== Table =====
| Pos | Team | Pld | W | D | L | GF | GA | GD | Pts | Qualification |
|---|---|---|---|---|---|---|---|---|---|---|
| 1 | Jagiellonia Białystok | 30 | 18 | 5 | 7 | 56 | 31 | +25 | 59 | Qualification for the championship round |
| 2 | Legia Warsaw | 30 | 17 | 7 | 6 | 58 | 30 | +28 | 58 | Qualification for the championship round |
| 3 | Lech Poznań | 30 | 16 | 7 | 7 | 50 | 22 | +28 | 55 | Qualification for the championship round |
| 4 | Lechia Gdańsk | 30 | 16 | 5 | 9 | 46 | 37 | +9 | 53 | Qualification for the championship round |
| 5 | Wisła Kraków | 30 | 13 | 5 | 12 | 45 | 46 | −1 | 44 | Qualification for the championship round |

Source: Ekstraklasa, 90minut, Soccerway
Rules for classification: 1) Points; 2) Head-to-head points; 3) Head-to-head goal difference; 4) Head-to-head goals scored; 5) Head-to-head away goals scored (only if two teams); 6) Goal difference; 7) Goals scored; 8) Fairplay ranking; 9) Draw. (Note: Head-to-head record is used only after all the matches between the teams in question have been played).

===== Matches =====
| 16 July 2016 1 | Legia Warsaw | 1–1 | Jagiellonia Białystok | Warsaw |
| 20:30 CEST (UTC+2) | Aleksandrov 45' | Report | Černych 56' | Stadium: Polish Army Stadium; Referee: Szymon Marciniak |

| 23 July 2016 2 | Legia Warsaw | 0–0 | Śląsk Wrocław | Warsaw |
| 20:30 CEST (UTC+2) | | Report | | Stadium: Polish Army Stadium; Referee: Jarosław Przybył |

| 30 July 2016 3 | Wisła Płock | 2–3 | Legia Warsaw | Płock |
| 20:30 CEST (UTC+2) | Božić 2'; Szymiński 10' | Report | Prijović 17'; Kucharczyk 41'; Lewczuk 58' | Stadium: Kazimierz Górski Stadium; Referee: Tomasz Musiał |

| 7 August 2016 4 | Legia Warsaw | 0–0 | Piast Gliwice | Warsaw |
| 18:00 CEST (UTC+2) | | Report | | Stadium: Polish Army Stadium; Referee: Paweł Gil |

| 13 August 2016 5 | Górnik Łęczna | 1–0 | Legia Warsaw | Lublin |
| 18:00 CEST (UTC+2) | Ubiparip 80' | Report | | Stadium: Arena Lublin; Referee: Krzysztof Jakubik |

| 20 August 2016 6 | Legia Warsaw | 1–3 | Arka Gdynia | Warsaw |
| 20:30 CEST (UTC+2) | Hämäläinen 62' | Report | Vinícius 6'; Marciniak 19', 58' | Stadium: Polish Army Stadium; Referee: Mariusz Złotek |

| 28 August 2016 7 | Ruch Chorzów | 0–2 | Legia Warsaw | Chorzów |
| 18:00 CEST (UTC+2) | | Report | Nikolić 39', 76' | Stadium: Stadion Miejski; Referee: Daniel Stefański |

| 10 September 2016 8 | Nieciecza | 2–1 | Legia Warsaw | Nieciecza |
| 20:30 CEST (UTC+2) | Jovanović 20' (pen.); Kędziora 84' (pen.) | Report | Nikolić 90+3' | Stadium: Stadion Termaliki Bruk-Bet; Referee: Bartosz Frankowski |

| 18 September 2016 9 | Legia Warsaw | 2–3 | Zagłębie Lubin | Warsaw |
| 18:00 CEST (UTC+2) | Czerwiński 50'; Langil 57' | Report | Jach 17'; Janus 35' (pen.); Pazdan 71' (o.g.) | Stadium: Polish Army Stadium; Referee: Tomasz Musiał |

| 23 September 2016 10 | Wisła Kraków | 0–0 | Legia Warsaw | Kraków |
| 20:30 CEST (UTC+2) | | Report | | Stadium: Henryk Reyman Stadium; Referee: Paweł Gil |

| 1 October 2016 11 | Legia Warsaw | 3–0 | Lechia Gdańsk | Warsaw |
| 20:30 CEST (UTC+2) | Guilherme 49', 58'; Nikolić 70' | Report | | Stadium: Polish Army Stadium; Referee: Szymon Marciniak |

| 14 October 2016 12 | Pogoń Szczecin | 3–2 | Legia Warsaw | Szczecin |
| 20:30 CEST (UTC+2) | Frączczak 7', 40' (pen.); Murawski 72' | Report | Radović 24', 74' | Stadium: Florian Krygier Stadium; Referee: Mariusz Złotek |

| 22 October 2016 13 | Legia Warsaw | 2–1 | Lech Poznań | Warsaw |
| 20:30 CEST (UTC+2) | Nikolić 64'; Hämäläinen 90+3' | Report | Robak 90' (pen.) | Stadium: Polish Army Stadium; Referee: Szymon Marciniak |

| 28 October 2016 14 | Korona Kielce | 2–4 | Legia Warsaw | Kielce |
| 20:30 CEST (UTC+2) | Palanca 8' (pen.); Grzelak 12' | Report | Guilherme 29'; Nikolić 57'; Rymaniak 61' (o.g.); Prijović 83' | Stadium: Kielce Stadium; Referee: Tomasz Musiał |

| 6 November 2016 15 | Legia Warsaw | 2–0 | Cracovia | Warsaw |
| 18:00 CET (UTC+1) | Nikolić 43'; Radović 90+2' | Report | | Stadium: Polish Army Stadium; Referee: Mariusz Złotek |

| 18 November 2016 16 | Jagiellonia Białystok | 1–4 | Legia Warsaw | Białystok |
| 20:30 CET (UTC+1) | Romanczuk 90+2' | Report | Guilherme 39'; Odjidja-Ofoe 62'; Prijović 90'; Kucharczyk 90+3' | Stadium: Białystok Stadium; Referee: Bartosz Frankowski |

| 27 November 2016 17 | Śląsk Wrocław | 0–4 | Legia Warsaw | Wrocław |
| 18:00 CET (UTC+1) | | Report | Radović 1'; Gonçalves 5' (o.g.); Prijović 7', 44' | Stadium: Wrocław Stadium; Referee: Daniel Stefański |

| 2 December 2016 18 | Legia Warsaw | 2–2 | Wisła Płock | Warsaw |
| 20:30 CET (UTC+1) | Nikolić 10'; Hämäläinen 56' | Report | Furman 63'; Sylwestrzak 78' | Stadium: Polish Army Stadium; Referee: Jarosław Przybył |

| 11 December 2016 19 | Piast Gliwice | 1–5 | Legia Warsaw | Gliwice |
| 18:00 CET (UTC+1) | Sapała 90+2' | Report | Radović 32', 73'; Nikolić 45+1', 79'; Odjidja-Ofoe 81' | Stadium: Stadion Miejski; Referee: Mariusz Złotek |

| 18 December 2016 20 | Legia Warsaw | 5–0 | Górnik Łęczna | Warsaw |
| 18:00 CET (UTC+1) | Nikolić 5', 58', 76'; Radović 20'; Hämäläinen 90+3' | Report | | Stadium: Polish Army Stadium; Referee: Daniel Stefański |

| 11 February 2017 21 | Arka Gdynia | 0–1 | Legia Warsaw | Gdynia |
| 20:30 CET (UTC+1) | | Report | Jodłowiec 39' | Stadium: Stadion Miejski; Referee: Tomasz Musiał |

| 19 February 2017 22 | Legia Warsaw | 1–3 | Ruch Chorzów | Warsaw |
| 18:00 CET (UTC+1) | Radović 84' | Report | Lipski 14'; Urbańczyk 42'; Niezgoda 51' | Stadium: Polish Army Stadium; Referee: Daniel Stefański |

| 26 February 2017 23 | Legia Warsaw | 1–1 | Nieciecza | Warsaw |
| 18:00 CET (UTC+1) | Radović 37' | Report | Štefánik 22' | Stadium: Polish Army Stadium; Referee: Mariusz Złotek |

| 3 March 2017 24 | Zagłębie Lubin | 1–3 | Legia Warsaw | Lubin |
| 20:30 CET (UTC+1) | Woźniak 56' | Report | Moulin 36'; Dąbrowski 82'; Szymański 88' | Stadium: Lubin Stadium; Referee: Jarosław Przybył |

| 12 March 2017 25 | Legia Warsaw | 1–0 | Wisła Kraków | Warsaw |
| 18:00 CET (UTC+1) | Radović 11' | Report | | Stadium: Polish Army Stadium; Referee: Paweł Gil |

| 19 March 2017 26 | Lechia Gdańsk | 1–2 | Legia Warsaw | Gdańsk |
| 18:00 CET (UTC+1) | Maloča 48' | Report | Kucharczyk 58', 87' | Stadium: Stadion Energa Gdańsk; Referee: Daniel Stefański |

| 1 April 2017 27 | Legia Warsaw | 2–0 | Pogoń Szczecin | Warsaw |
| 20:30 CEST (UTC+2) | Kucharczyk 63'; Odjidja-Ofoe 77' | Report | | Stadium: Polish Army Stadium; Referee: Adrien Jaccottet (Switzerland) |

| 9 April 2017 28 | Lech Poznań | 1–2 | Legia Warsaw | Poznań |
| 18:00 CEST (UTC+2) | Kędziora 82' | Report | Dąbrowski 87'; Hämäläinen 90+4' | Stadium: Poznań Stadium; Referee: Daniel Stefański |

| 17 April 2017 29 | Legia Warsaw | 0–0 | Korona Kielce | Warsaw |
| 15:30 CEST (UTC+2) | | Report | | Stadium: Polish Army Stadium; Referee: Bartosz Frankowski |

| 22 April 2017 30 | Cracovia | 1–2 | Legia Warsaw | Kraków |
| 18:00 CEST (UTC+2) | Dąbrowski 44' (pen.) | Report | Nagy 18'; Necid 49' | Stadium: Józef Piłsudski Stadium; Referee: Jarosław Przybył |

==== Championship round ====
===== Table =====
| Pos | Team | Pld | W | D | L | GF | GA | GD | Pts | Qualification |
|---|---|---|---|---|---|---|---|---|---|---|
| 1 | Legia Warsaw (C) | 37 | 21 | 10 | 6 | 70 | 31 | +39 | 44 | Qualification for the Champions League second qualifying round |
| 2 | Jagiellonia Białystok | 37 | 21 | 8 | 8 | 64 | 39 | +25 | 42 (Note: Regular season record: Jagiellonia 59 pts, Lech 55 pts, Lechia 53 pts.) | Qualification for the Europa League first qualifying round |
| 3 | Lech Poznań | 37 | 20 | 9 | 8 | 62 | 29 | +33 | 42 | Qualification for the Europa League first qualifying round |
| 4 | Lechia Gdańsk | 37 | 20 | 8 | 9 | 57 | 37 | +20 | 42 | |
| 5 | Korona Kielce | 37 | 14 | 5 | 18 | 47 | 65 | −18 | 28 | |

Source: Ekstraklasa, 90minut
Rules for classification: 1) Points; 2) Points in regular season; 3) Head-to-head points in regular season; 4) Head-to-head goal difference in regular season; 5) Head-to-head goals scored in regular season; 5) Head-to-head away goals scored in regular season (if only two teams); 7) Goal difference; 8) Goals scored; 9) Fairplay ranking; 10) Play-off (only if needed to decide champion, teams for relegation or teams for UEFA competitions).
(C) Champions

===== Matches =====
| 30 April 2017 31 | Legia Warsaw | 1–1 | Wisła Kraków | Warsaw |
| 18:00 CEST (UTC+2) | Jędrzejczyk 75' | Report | Brlek 58' (pen.) | Stadium: Polish Army Stadium; Referee: Daniel Stefański |

| 7 May 2017 32 | Pogoń Szczecin | 0–2 | Legia Warsaw | Szczecin |
| 18:00 CEST (UTC+2) | | Report | Nagy 49'; Moulin 69' | Stadium: Florian Krygier Stadium; Referee: Szymon Marciniak |

| 14 May 2017 33 | Legia Warsaw | 6–0 | Nieciecza | Warsaw |
| 18:00 CEST (UTC+2) | Hämäläinen 5', 74'; Radović 28'; Nagy 52'; Guilherme 56' (pen.); Qazaishvili 88' | Report | Jovanović (yellow card) 44' | Stadium: Polish Army Stadium; Referee: Tomasz Musiał |

| 17 May 2017 34 | Legia Warsaw | 2–0 | Lech Poznań | Warsaw |
| 20:30 CEST (UTC+2) | Odjidja-Ofoe 7'; Kucharczyk 83' | Report | | Stadium: Polish Army Stadium; Referee: Daniel Stefański |

| 21 May 2017 35 | Jagiellonia Białystok | 0–0 | Legia Warsaw | Białystok |
| 18:00 CEST (UTC+2) | | Report | | Stadium: Białystok Stadium; Referee: Bartosz Frankowski |

| 28 May 2017 36 | Korona Kielce | 0–1 | Legia Warsaw | Kielce |
| 18:00 CEST (UTC+2) | | Report | Nagy 35' | Stadium: Kielce Stadium; Referee: Jarosław Przybył |

| 4 June 2017 37 | Legia Warsaw | 0–0 | Lechia Gdańsk | Warsaw |
| 18:00 CEST (UTC+2) | | Report | | Stadium: Polish Army Stadium; Referee: Bartosz Frankowski |

=== Polish Cup ===
| 10 August 2016 Round of 32 | Górnik Zabrze | 3–2 (a.e.t.) | Legia Warsaw | Zabrze |
| 20:30 CEST (UTC+2) | Kopacz 54', 105'; Kurzawa 61' | Report | Hämäläinen 37'; Nikolić 39' | Stadium: Arena Zabrze; Referee: Sebastian Krasny |

=== UEFA Champions League ===
==== Qualifying rounds ====
===== Second qualifying round =====
| 12 July 2016 First leg | Zrinjski Mostar (Bosnia and Herzegovina) | 1–1 | (Poland) Legia Warsaw | Mostar, Bosnia and Herczegovina |
| 18:30 CEST (UTC+2) | Stojkić (yellow card) 32'; Todorović (yellow card) 37'; Bilbija (yellow card) 40'; Katanec 57', (yellow card) 61'; Tomić (yellow card) 81' | Report | Jodłowiec (yellow card) 44'; Nikolić 49'; Moulin (yellow card) 90+4' | Stadium: Stadion pod Bijelim Brijegom; Attendance: 5,500; Referee: Carlos Clos Gómez (Spain) |

| 19 July 2016 Second leg | Legia Warsaw (Poland) | 2–0 (3–1 agg.) | (Bosnia and Herzegovina) Zrinjski Mostar | Warsaw, Poland |
| 20:45 CEST (UTC+2) | Nikolić 28' (pen.), 62'; Lewczuk (yellow card) 70' | Report | Bilbija (yellow card) 28' | Stadium: Polish Army Stadium; Attendance: 12,784; Referee: Nicolas Rainville (France) |
Note: Legia Warsaw won 3–1 on aggregate.

===== Third qualifying round =====
| 27 July 2016 First leg | Trenčín (Slovakia) | 0–1 | (Poland) Legia Warsaw | Žilina, Slovakia (Note: The match was played at the Štadión pod Dubňom in Žilina, instead of Trenčín regular stadium, the Štadión na Sihoti in Trenčín.) |
| 20:30 CEST (UTC+2) | Bero (yellow card) 33'; Kalu (yellow card) 74' | Report | Kopczyński (yellow card) 24'; Nikolić 69' | Stadium: Štadión pod Dubňom; Attendance: 5,866; Referee: Aleksei Kulbakov (Belarus) |

| 3 August 2016 Second leg | Legia Warsaw (Poland) | 0–0 (1–0 agg.) | (Slovakia) Trenčín | Warsaw, Poland |
| 20:45 CEST (UTC+2) | Prijović (yellow card) 79' | Report | Bero (yellow card) 90+4'; Šulek (yellow card) 90+5' | Stadium: Polish Army Stadium; Attendance: 21,850; Referee: Vladislav Bezborodov (Russia) |
Note: Legia Warsaw won 1–0 on aggregate.

==== Play-off round ====
| 17 August 2016 First leg | Dundalk (Republic of Ireland) | 0–2 | (Poland) Legia Warsaw | Dublin, Ireland (Note: The match was played at the Aviva Stadium in Dublin, instead of Dundalk regular stadium, the Oriel Park in Dundalk.) |
| 19:45 IST (UTC+1) | O'Donnell (yellow card) 20'; Boyle (yellow card) 55' | Report | Odjidja-Ofoe (yellow card) 44'; Nikolić 56' (pen.); Hloušek (yellow card) 69'; Prijović 90+4' | Stadium: Aviva Stadium; Attendance: 30,417; Referee: Deniz Aytekin (Germany) |

| 23 August 2016 Second leg | Legia Warsaw (Poland) | 1–1 (3–1 agg.) | (Republic of Ireland) Dundalk | Warsaw, Poland |
| 20:45 CEST (UTC+2) | Odjidja-Ofoe (yellow card) 7'; Hloušek (yellow card) 57' (yellow-red card) 67'; Kucharczyk 90+2', (yellow card) 90+4' | Report | Benson 19', (yellow card) 73' | Stadium: Polish Army Stadium; Attendance: 29,066; Referee: Svein Oddvar Moen (Norway) |
Note: Legia Warsaw won 3–1 on aggregate.

==== Group stage ====
| Pos | Team | Pld | W | D | L | GF | GA | GD | Pts | Qualification | DOR | RMA | LEG | SPO |
|---|---|---|---|---|---|---|---|---|---|---|---|---|---|---|
| 1 | (Germany) Borussia Dortmund | 6 | 4 | 2 | 0 | 21 | 9 | +12 | 14 | Advance to knockout phase | — | 2–2 | 8–4 | 1–0 |
| 2 | (Spain) Real Madrid | 6 | 3 | 3 | 0 | 16 | 10 | +6 | 12 | Advance to knockout phase | 2–2 | — | 5–1 | 2–1 |
| 3 | (Poland) Legia Warsaw | 6 | 1 | 1 | 4 | 9 | 24 | −15 | 4 | Transfer to Europa League | 0–6 | 3–3 | — | 1–0 |
| 4 | (Portugal) Sporting CP | 6 | 1 | 0 | 5 | 5 | 8 | −3 | 3 | | 1–2 | 1–2 | 2–0 | — |

Source: UEFA
Rules for classification: Group stage tiebreakers

| 14 September 2016 1 | Legia Warsaw (Poland) | 0–6 | (Germany) Borussia Dortmund | Warsaw, Poland |
| 20:45 CEST (UTC+2) | Malarz (yellow card) 16'; Guilherme (yellow card) 30'; Bereszyński (yellow card) 61' | Report | Götze 7', (yellow card) 74'; Papastathopoulos 15'; Bartra 17'; Guerreiro 51'; Castro 76'; Aubameyang 87' | Stadium: Polish Army Stadium; Attendance: 27,304; Referee: Sergei Karasev (Russia) |

| 27 September 2016 2 | Sporting CP (Portugal) | 2–0 | (Poland) Legia Warsaw | Lisbon, Portugal |
| 19:45 WEST (UTC+1) | B. Ruiz 28'; Dost 37' | Report | Guilherme (yellow card) 39'; Bereszyński (yellow card) 86'; Rzeźniczak (yellow card) 87' | Stadium: Estádio José Alvalade; Attendance: 40,094; Referee: Michael Oliver (England) |

| 18 October 2016 3 | Real Madrid (Spain) | 5–1 | (Poland) Legia Warsaw | Madrid, Spain |
| 20:45 CEST (UTC+2) | Bale 16'; Jodłowiec 20' (o.g.); Asensio 37'; Ronaldo (yellow card) 63'; Vázquez 68'; Morata 84' | Report | Radović 22' (pen.), (yellow card) 62'; Moulin (yellow card) 51' | Stadium: Santiago Bernabéu; Attendance: 70,251; Referee: Ruddy Buquet (France) |

| 2 November 2016 4 | Legia Warsaw (Poland) | 3–3 | (Spain) Real Madrid | Warsaw, Poland |
| 20:45 CET (UTC+1) | Odjidja-Ofoe 40'; Radović 58'; Moulin 83' | Report | Bale 1'; Benzema 35'; Kovačić 85' | Stadium: Polish Army Stadium; Attendance: 0 Referee: Pavel Královec (Czech Republic) |
Note: The match was played behind closed doors due to punishment by UEFA.

| 22 November 2016 5 | Borussia Dortmund (Germany) | 8–4 | (Poland) Legia Warsaw | Dortmund, Germany |
| 20:45 CET (UTC+1) | Kagawa 17', 18'; Şahin 20'; Dembélé 29'; Reus 32', 52'; Passlack 81'; Ginter (yellow card) 88'; Rzeźniczak 90+2' (o.g.) | Report | Prijović 10', 24'; Kucharczyk 57'; Odjidja-Ofoe (yellow card) 61'; Pazdan (yellow card) 63'; Nikolić 83' | Stadium: Westfalenstadion; Attendance: 55,094; Referee: Martin Strömbergsson (Sweden) |

| 7 December 2016 6 | Legia Warsaw (Poland) | 1–0 | (Portugal) Sporting CP | Warsaw, Poland |
| 20:45 CET (UTC+1) | Guilherme 30'; Kopczyński (yellow card) 36'; Rzeźniczak (yellow card) 74'; Odjidja-Ofoe (yellow card) 75'; Radović (yellow card) 79'; Pazdan (yellow card) 81' | Report | Silva (yellow card) 56'; Carvalho (yellow card) 81' (yellow-red card) 85' | Stadium: Polish Army Stadium; Attendance: 28,232; Referee: Gianluca Rocchi (Italy) |

=== UEFA Europa League ===
==== Knockout phase ====
===== Round of 32 =====
| 16 February 2017 First leg | Legia Warsaw (Poland) | 0–0 | (Netherlands) Ajax | Warsaw, Poland |
| 21:05 CET (UTC+1) | Broź (yellow card) 63'; Radović (yellow card) 70' | Report | Tete (yellow card) 71' (yellow-red card) 84'; Klaassen (yellow card) 84' | Stadium: Polish Army Stadium; Attendance: 28,742; Referee: David Fernández Borbalán (Spain) |

| 23 February 2017 Second leg | Ajax (Netherlands) | 1–0 (1–0 agg.) | (Poland) Legia Warsaw | Amsterdam, Netherlands |
| 19:00 CET (UTC+1) | Viergever 49'; Sánchez (yellow card) 71'; Traoré (yellow card) 75'; Veltman (yellow card) 86'; Onana (yellow card) 90+4' | Report | | Stadium: Amsterdam Arena; Attendance: 52,285; Referee: Anthony Taylor (England) |
Note: Ajax won 1–0 on aggregate.
