= 2016–17 in Polish football =

Football in Poland
- Season: 2016–17

2016–17 in Polish football
- Ekstraklasa champions
- Legia Warsaw
- Polish Cup winner
- Arka Gdynia
- Polish Super Cup winner
- Lech Poznań
- Teams in Europe
- Legia Warsaw, Piast Gliwice, Zagłębie Lubin, Cracovia
- Poland national team
- 2018 FIFA World Cup qualification

The 2016–2017 season was the 92nd season of competitive football in Poland.

== League competitions ==
=== Ekstraklasa ===
==== Regular season ====
Pos	Team	Pld	W	D	L	GF	GA	GD	Pts	Qualification
1	Jagiellonia Białystok	30	18	5	7	56	31	+25	59	Qualification for the championship round
2	Legia Warsaw	30	17	7	6	58	30	+28	58	Qualification for the championship round
3	Lech Poznań	30	16	7	7	50	22	+28	55	Qualification for the championship round
4	Lechia Gdańsk	30	16	5	9	46	37	+9	53	Qualification for the championship round
5	Wisła Kraków	30	13	5	12	45	46	−1	44	Qualification for the championship round
6	Pogoń Szczecin	30	10	12	8	47	40	+7	42 (Note: Head-to-head record: Pogoń 5–0 Nieciecza, Nieciecza 2–0 Pogoń.)	Qualification for the championship round
7	Nieciecza	30	12	6	12	31	38	−7	42	Qualification for the championship round
8	Korona Kielce	30	12	3	15	39	55	−16	39 (Note: Head-to-head record: Korona 9 pts (8–8), Wisła P. 6 pts (7-8), Zagłębie 3 pts (7–6).)	Qualification for the championship round
9	Wisła Płock	30	10	9	11	42	44	−2	39	Qualification for the relegation round
10	Zagłębie Lubin	30	10	9	11	37	36	+1	39	Qualification for the relegation round
11	Śląsk Wrocław	30	8	10	12	34	45	−11	34	Qualification for the relegation round
12	Arka Gdynia	30	8	7	15	37	50	−13	31 (Note: Head-to-head record: Arka 1–0 Cracovia, Cracovia 1–1 Arka.)	Qualification for the relegation round
13	Cracovia	30	6	13	11	38	43	−5	31	Qualification for the relegation round
14	Ruch Chorzów (Note: Ruch Chorzów were punished with a deduction of four points due to financial problems.)	30	10	4	16	37	46	−9	30 (Note: Head-to-head record: Ruch 7 pts (7–3), Piast 5 pts (5-5), Górnik 4 pts (5–9).)	Qualification for the relegation round
15	Piast Gliwice	30	7	9	14	31	49	−18	30	Qualification for the relegation round
16	Górnik Łęczna	30	7	9	14	36	52	−16	30	Qualification for the relegation round

Source: Ekstraklasa, 90minut, Soccerway
Rules for classification: 1) Points; 2) Head-to-head points; 3) Head-to-head goal difference; 4) Head-to-head goals scored; 5) Head-to-head away goals scored (only if two teams); 6) Goal difference; 7) Goals scored; 8) Fairplay ranking; 9) Draw. (Note: Head-to-head record is used only after all the matches between the teams in question have been played).

==== Championship round ====
Pos	Team	Pld	W	D	L	GF	GA	GD	Pts	Qualification
1	Legia Warsaw (C)	37	21	10	6	70	31	+39	44	Qualification for the Champions League second qualifying round
2	Jagiellonia Białystok	37	21	8	8	64	39	+25	42 (Note: Regular season record: Jagiellonia 59 pts, Lech 55 pts, Lechia 53 pts.)	Qualification for the Europa League first qualifying round
3	Lech Poznań	37	20	9	8	62	29	+33	42	Qualification for the Europa League first qualifying round
4	Lechia Gdańsk	37	20	8	9	57	37	+20	42	
5	Korona Kielce	37	14	5	18	47	65	−18	28	
6	Wisła Kraków	37	14	6	17	54	57	−3	26	
7	Pogoń Szczecin	37	11	13	13	51	54	−3	25 (Note: Regular season record: Pogoń 42 pts, Nieciecza 42 pts. Head-to-head record: Pogoń 5–0 Nieciecza, Nieciecza 2–0 Pogoń.)	
8	Bruk-Bet Termalica Nieciecza	37	13	7	17	35	55	−20	25	

Source: Ekstraklasa, 90minut
Rules for classification: 1) Points; 2) Points in regular season; 3) Head-to-head points in regular season; 4) Head-to-head goal difference in regular season; 5) Head-to-head goals scored in regular season; 5) Head-to-head away goals scored in regular season (if only two teams); 7) Goal difference; 8) Goals scored; 9) Fairplay ranking; 10) Play-off (only if needed to decide champion, teams for relegation or teams for UEFA competitions).
(C) Champions

==== Relegation round ====
Pos	Team	Pld	W	D	L	GF	GA	GD	Pts	Qualification
9	Zagłębie Lubin	37	14	11	12	51	45	+6	34	
10	Piast Gliwice	37	12	10	15	45	54	−9	31	
11	Śląsk Wrocław	37	12	10	15	49	52	−3	29	
12	Wisła Płock	37	12	11	14	49	57	−8	28	
13	Arka Gdynia	37	10	9	18	44	60	−16	24 (Note: Regular season record: Arka 31 pts, Cracovia 31 pts. Head-to-head record: Arka 1–0 Cracovia, Cracovia 1–1 Arka.)	Qualification for the Europa League third qualifying round (Note: Arka Gdynia qualified for the Europa League third qualifying round by winning the 2016–17 Polish Cup.)
14	Cracovia	37	8	15	14	45	52	−7	24	
15	Górnik Łęczna (R)	37	9	10	18	47	63	−16	22	Relegation to I liga
16	Ruch Chorzów (R)	37	10	8	19	42	62	−20	19	Relegation to I liga

Source: Ekstraklasa, 90minut
Rules for classification: 1) Points; 2) Points in regular season; 3) Head-to-head points in regular season; 4) Head-to-head goal difference in regular season; 5) Head-to-head goals scored in regular season; 5) Head-to-head away goals scored in regular season (if only two teams); 7) Goal difference; 8) Goals scored.
(R) Relegated

=== I liga ===
Pos	Team	Pld	W	D	L	GF	GA	GD	Pts	Promotion or Relegation
1	Sandecja Nowy Sącz (C, P)	34	18	7	9	50	29	+21	61	Promotion to Ekstraklasa
2	Górnik Zabrze (P)	34	17	7	10	53	34	+19	58	Promotion to Ekstraklasa
3	Zagłębie Sosnowiec	34	16	9	9	53	44	+9	57 (Note: Head-to-head record: Zagłębie 1–0 Miedź, Miedź 2–1 Zagłębie.)	
4	Miedź Legnica	34	16	9	9	49	27	+22	57	
5	Chojniczanka Chojnice	34	13	17	4	54	48	+6	56 (Note: Head-to-head record: Chojniczanka 3–1 Olimpia, Olimpia 0–1 Chojniczanka .)	
6	Olimpia Grudziądz	34	17	5	12	48	35	+13	56	
7	GKS Katowice	34	15	9	10	47	32	+15	54	
8	Podbeskidzie Bielsko-Biała	34	14	11	9	40	39	+1	53	
9	Wigry Suwałki	34	15	7	12	51	45	+6	52	
10	Stal Mielec	34	12	9	13	39	42	−3	45	
11	Pogoń Siedlce	34	13	5	16	34	46	−12	44	
12	Chrobry Głogów	34	12	7	15	50	50	0	43	
13	Stomil Olsztyn (Note: Stomil Olsztyn were punished with a deduction of three points for failing with licensing requirements.)	34	9	13	12	48	50	−2	37 (Note: Head-to-head record: Stomil 4–0 Tychy. Tychy 2–2 Stomil.)	
14	GKS Tychy	34	10	7	17	42	52	−10	37	
15	Bytovia Bytów	34	8	11	15	38	47	−9	35	Qualification to play-off
16	Wisła Puławy (R)	34	7	12	15	33	49	−16	33	Relegation to II liga
17	Znicz Pruszków (R)	34	8	6	20	35	64	−29	30	Relegation to II liga
18	MKS Kluczbork (R)	34	4	13	17	35	66	−31	25	Relegation to II liga

Source: 90minut.pl
Rules for classification: 1. points won; 2. points in head-to-head matches; 3. goal difference in hth matches; 4. goals scored in hth matches; 5. away goals in hth matches (only if two teams are tied); 6. total goal difference; 7. total goals scored; 8. fairplay ranking.
(C) Champions; (P) Promoted; (R) Relegated

== Polish Cup ==
2 May 2017 Final	Lech Poznań	1–2 (a.e.t.)	Arka Gdynia	National Stadium, Warsaw
16:00 CEST (UTC+02:00)	Robak (yellow card) 50'; Trałka 119'	Report	Szwoch (yellow card) 20'; Marcus (yellow card) 53'; Łukasiewicz (yellow card) 77'; Siemaszko 107'; Zarandia 111', (yellow card) 113'	Attendance: 43,760; Referee: Tomasz Musiał (Kraków)

== Polish Super Cup ==
7 July 2016 2016 Polish Super Cup	Legia Warsaw	1–4	Lech Poznań	Polish Army Stadium, Warsaw
17:30 CEST (UTC+2)	Guilherme (yellow card) 27', (goal) 36'; Broź (yellow card) 34'; Makowski (yellow card) 58'	Report	Makuszewski 22'; Bille (yellow card) 40'; Trałka (yellow card) 50'; L. Nielsen 65'; Formella 90+1', 90+3'	Attendance: 15,000; Referee: Krzysztof Jakubik (Siedlce)

== Polish clubs in Europe ==
=== Legia Warsaw ===
2016–17 UEFA Champions League

==== Qualifying phase ====
12 July 2016 2nd QR	Zrinjski Mostar (Bosnia and Herzegovina)	1–1	(Poland) Legia Warsaw	Stadion pod Bijelim Brijegom, Mostar
18:30 CEST (UTC+2)	Stojkić (yellow card) 32'; Todorović (yellow card) 37'; Bilbija (yellow card) 40'; Katanec 57', (yellow card) 61'; Tomić (yellow card) 81'	Report	Jodłowiec (yellow card) 44'; Nikolić 49'; Moulin (yellow card) 90+4'	Attendance: 4,500; Referee: Carlos Clos Gómez (Spain)

19 July 2016 2nd QR	Legia Warsaw (Poland)	2–0 (3–1 agg.)	(Bosnia and Herzegovina) Zrinjski Mostar	Polish Army Stadium, Warsaw
20:45 CEST (UTC+2)	Nikolić 28' (pen.), 62'; Lewczuk (yellow card) 70'	Report	Bilbija (yellow card) 28'	Attendance: 12,784; Referee: Nicolas Rainville (France)

27 July 2016 3rd QR	AS Trenčín (Slovakia)	0–1	(Poland) Legia Warsaw	Štadión pod Dubňom, Žilina
20:30 CEST (UTC+2)	Bero (yellow card) 33'; Kalu (yellow card) 74'	Report	Kopczyński (yellow card) 24'; Nikolić 69'	Attendance: 5,866; Referee: Aleksei Kulbakov (Belarus)

3 August 2016 3rd QR	Legia Warsaw (Poland)	0–0 (1–0 agg.)	(Slovakia) AS Trenčín	Polish Army Stadium, Warsaw
20:45 CEST (UTC+2)	Prijović (yellow card) 79'	Report	Bero (yellow card) 90+4'; Šulek (yellow card) 90+5'	Attendance: 21,850; Referee: Vladislav Bezborodov (Russia)

17 August 2016 4th QR	Dundalk (Republic of Ireland)	0–2	(Poland) Legia Warsaw	Aviva Stadium, Dublin
20:45 CEST (UTC+2)	O'Donnell (yellow card) 20'; Boyle (yellow card) 55'	Report	Odjidja-Ofoe (yellow card) 44'; Nikolić 56' (pen.); Hloušek (yellow card) 69'; Prijović 90+4'	Attendance: 30,417; Referee: Deniz Aytekin (Germany)

23 August 2016 4th QR	Legia Warsaw (Poland)	1–1 (3–1 agg.)	(Republic of Ireland) Dundalk	Polish Army Stadium, Warsaw
20:45 CEST (UTC+2)	Odjidja-Ofoe (yellow card) 7'; Hloušek (yellow card) 57' (yellow-red card) 67'; Kucharczyk 90+2', (yellow card) 90+4'	Report	Benson 19', (yellow card) 73'	Attendance: 29,066; Referee: Svein Oddvar Moen (Norway)

==== Group stage ====
Pos	Team	Pld	W	D	L	GF	GA	GD	Pts	Qualification	DOR	RMA	LEG	SPO
1	(Germany) Borussia Dortmund	6	4	2	0	21	9	+12	14	Advance to knockout phase	—	2–2	8–4	1–0
2	(Spain) Real Madrid	6	3	3	0	16	10	+6	12	Advance to knockout phase	2–2	—	5–1	2–1
3	(Poland) Legia Warsaw	6	1	1	4	9	24	−15	4	Transfer to Europa League	0–6	3–3	—	1–0
4	(Portugal) Sporting CP	6	1	0	5	5	8	−3	3		1–2	1–2	2–0	—

Source: UEFA
Rules for classification: Group stage tiebreakers

14 September 2016 GS	Legia Warsaw (Poland)	0–6	(Germany) Borussia Dortmund	Polish Army Stadium, Warsaw
20:45 CEST (UTC+2)	Malarz (yellow card) 16'; Guilherme (yellow card) 30'; Bereszyński (yellow card) 61'	Report	Götze 7'; Sokratis 15'; Bartra 17'; Guerreiro 51'; Götze (yellow card) 74'; Castro 76'; Aubameyang 87'	Attendance: 27,304; Referee: Sergei Karasev (Russia)

27 September 2016 GS	Sporting CP (Portugal)	2–0	(Poland) Legia Warsaw	Estádio José Alvalade, Lisbon
20:45 CEST (UTC+2)	Ruiz 28'; Dost 37'	Report	Guilherme (yellow card) 39'; Bereszyński (yellow card) 86'; Rzeźniczak (yellow card) 87'	Attendance: 40,094; Referee: Michael Oliver (England)

18 October 2016 GS	Real Madrid (Spain)	5–1	(Poland) Legia Warsaw	Santiago Bernabéu, Madrid
20:45 CEST (UTC+2)	Bale 16'; Jodłowiec 20' (o.g.); Asensio 37'; Ronaldo (yellow card) 63'; Vázquez 68'; Morata 84'	Report	Radović 22' (pen.), (yellow card) 62'; Moulin (yellow card) 51'	Attendance: 70,251; Referee: Ruddy Buquet (France)

2 November 2016 GS	Legia Warsaw (Poland)	3–3	(Spain) Real Madrid	Polish Army Stadium, Warsaw
20:45 CET (UTC+1)	Odjidja-Ofoe 40'; Radović 58'; Moulin 83'	Report	Bale 1'; Benzema 35'; Kovačić 85'	Attendance: 0 Referee: Pavel Královec (Czech Republic)

22 November 2016 GS	Borussia Dortmund (Germany)	8–4	(Poland) Legia Warsaw	Westfalenstadion, Dortmund
20:45 CET (UTC+1)	Kagawa 17', 18'; Şahin 20'; Dembélé 29'; Reus 32', 52'; Passlack 81'; Rzeźniczak 90+2' (o.g.); Ginter (yellow card) 88'	Report	Prijović 10', 24'; Kucharczyk 57'; Odjidja-Ofoe (yellow card) 61'; Pazdan (yellow card) 63'; Nikolić 83'	Attendance: 55,094; Referee: Martin Strömbergsson (Sweden)

7 December 2016 GS	Legia Warsaw (Poland)	1–0	(Portugal) Sporting CP	Polish Army Stadium, Warsaw
20:45 CET (UTC+1)	Guilherme 30'; Kopczyński (yellow card) 36'; Rzeźniczak (yellow card) 74'; Odjidja-Ofoe (yellow card) 75'; Radović (yellow card) 79'; Pazdan (yellow card) 81'	Report	Silva (yellow card) 56'; Carvalho (yellow card) 81' (yellow-red card) 85'	Attendance: 28,232; Referee: Gianluca Rocchi (Italy)

2016–17 UEFA Europa League

==== Knockout phase ====
16 February 2017 R32	Legia Warsaw (Poland)	0–0	(Netherlands) Ajax	Polish Army Stadium, Warsaw
21:05 CET (UTC+1)	Broź (yellow card) 63'; Radović (yellow card) 70'	Report	Tete (red card) 84'; Klaassen (yellow card) 84'	Attendance: 28,742; Referee: David Fernández Borbalán (Spain)

23 February 2017 R32	Ajax (Netherlands)	1–0 (1–0 agg.)	(Poland) Legia Warsaw	Amsterdam Arena, Amsterdam
19:00 CET (UTC+1)	Viergever 49'; Sánchez (yellow card) 71'; Traoré (yellow card) 75'; Veltman (yellow card) 86'; Onana (yellow card) 90+4'	Report		Attendance: 52,285; Referee: Anthony Taylor (England)

Notes

3. The Legia Warsaw vs Real Madrid match was played behind closed doors due to punishment by UEFA.

=== Piast Gliwice ===
2016–17 UEFA Europa League

==== Qualifying phase ====
14 July 2016 2nd QR	Piast Gliwice (Poland)	0–3	(Sweden) IFK Göteborg	Stadion Piast, Gliwice
20:45 CEST (UTC+2)	Masłowski (yellow card) 66'; Mak (yellow card) 88'; Girdvainis (yellow card) 90+3'	Report	Rogne 2'; Eriksson (yellow card) 30'; Hysén 35'; Engvall 86'	Attendance: 5,629; Referee: Manuel Schüttengruber (Austria)

21 July 2016 2nd QR	IFK Göteborg (Sweden)	0–0 (3–0 agg.)	(Poland) Piast Gliwice	Gamla Ullevi, Gothenburg
19:00 CEST (UTC+2)		Report	Bukata (yellow card) 43'; Badía (yellow card) 90'	Attendance: 7,276; Referee: Giórgos Komínis (Greece)

=== Zagłębie Lubin ===
2016–17 UEFA Europa League

==== Qualifying phase ====
30 June 2016 1st QR	Slavia Sofia (Bulgaria)	1–0	(Poland) Zagłębie Lubin	Vasil Levski National Stadium, Sofia
18:30 CEST (UTC+2)	Pashov (yellow card) 39'; Serderov 85'	Report	Čotra (yellow card) 43'	Attendance: 1,160; Referee: Aliyar Aghayev (Azerbaijan)

7 July 2016 1st QR	Zagłębie Lubin (Poland)	3–0 (3–1 agg.)	(Bulgaria) Slavia Sofia	Stadion Zagłębia Lubin, Lubin
18:00 CEST (UTC+2)	Guldan 20'; Ł. Piątek 64'; Dąbrowski 81'; Todorovski (yellow card) 90+3'	Report	Omar (yellow card) 72'; Sergeyev (yellow card) 87'	Attendance: 5,817; Referee: Yuriy Mozharovsky (Ukraine)

14 July 2016 2nd QR	Partizan (Serbia)	0–0	(Poland) Zagłębie Lubin	Partizan Stadium, Belgrade
20:15 CEST (UTC+2)	Everton Luiz (yellow card) 28'	Report	Papadopulos (yellow card) 44' (yellow-red card) 56'; Woźniak (yellow card) 90+3'	Attendance: 12,000; Referee: Eitan Shemeulevitch (Israel)

21 July 2016 2nd QR	Zagłębie Lubin (Poland)	0–0 (a.e.t.) (0–0 agg.) (4–3 p)	(Serbia) Partizan	Stadion Zagłębia Lubin, Lubin
19:45 CEST (UTC+2)	Čotra (yellow card) 6'; Woźniak (yellow card) 32'; Dąbrowski (yellow card) 57'; Janoszka (yellow card) 72'	Report	Gogoua (yellow card) 86'; Radović (yellow card) 88'; Ilić (yellow card) 101'; Everton Luiz (yellow card) 103'	Attendance: 11,279; Referee: Anatoliy Abdula (Ukraine)
	Penalties
	Janus (penalty scored); Guldan (penalty scored); Todorovski (penalty missed); Woźniak (penalty scored); Vlasko (penalty scored)		(penalty missed) Brašanac; (penalty scored) Ilić; (penalty scored) Đuričković; (penalty scored) Janković; (penalty missed) Mihajlović

28 July 2016 3rd QR	Zagłębie Lubin (Poland)	1–2	(Denmark) SønderjyskE	Stadion Zagłębia Lubin, Lubin
19:00 CEST (UTC+2)	Vlasko (yellow card) 42'; Janoszka 45+2'	Report	Kroon 19' (yellow card) 31'; Dal Hende 36'; Kanstrup (yellow card) 61'; Guira (yellow card) 77'	Attendance: 10,271; Referee: Bobby Madley (England)

4 August 2016 3rd QR	SønderjyskE (Denmark)	1–1 (3–2 agg.)	(Poland) Zagłębie Lubin	Sydbank Park, Haderslev
19:15 CEST (UTC+2)	Pedersen 65'; Uhre (yellow card) 86'	Report	Guldan 22', (yellow card) 51'; Vlasko (yellow card) 63'	Attendance: 4,795; Referee: Tamás Bognár (Hungary)

=== Cracovia ===
2016–17 UEFA Europa League

==== Qualifying phase ====
30 June 2016 1st QR	Shkëndija (North Macedonia)	2–0	(Poland) Cracovia	Philip II Arena, Skopje
21:00 CEST (UTC+2)	Demiri (yellow card) 21'; Ibraimi 41'; Stênio Júnior 68'	Report	Wołąkiewicz (yellow card) 67'; Litauszki (yellow card) 72'	Attendance: 4,539; Referee: Sándor Andó-Szabó (Hungary)

7 July 2016 1st QR	Cracovia (Poland)	1–2 (1–4 agg.)	(North Macedonia) Shkëndija	Marshal Józef Piłsudski Stadium, Kraków
20:00 CEST (UTC+2)	Demiri 68' (o.g.); Steblecki (yellow card) 76'; Budziński (yellow card) 86'	Report	Ibraimi 13'; Radeski (yellow card) 41'; Vujčić (yellow card) 67'; Cuculi (yellow card) 82'; Hasani 90+3'	Attendance: 7,122; Referee: Gunnar Jarl Jónsson (Iceland)

== National teams ==
=== Poland national team ===
Pos	Team	Pld	W	D	L	GF	GA	GD	Pts	Qualification
1	Poland	10	8	1	1	28	14	+14	25	Qualification to 2018 FIFA World Cup
2	Denmark	10	6	2	2	20	8	+12	20	Advance to second round
3	Montenegro	10	5	1	4	20	12	+8	16	
4	Romania	10	3	4	3	12	10	+2	13	
5	Armenia	10	2	1	7	10	26	−16	7	
6	Kazakhstan	10	0	3	7	6	26	−20	3	

Source: FIFA
Rules for classification: Qualification tiebreakers

4 September 2016 2018 FIFA World Cup qualification	Kazakhstan	2–2	Poland	Astana Arena, Astana
18:00 CEST (UTC+2)	Malyi (yellow card) 18'; Akhmetov (yellow card) 43'; Khizhnichenko 51', 58', (yellow card) 70'; Baizhanov (yellow card) 56'; Kuat (yellow card) 71'; Islamkhan (yellow card) 74'	Report	Kapustka 9'; Lewandowski (yellow card) 18', (goal) 35' (pen.); Zieliński (yellow card) 28'; Piszczek (yellow card) 53'; Glik (yellow card) 73'	Attendance: 19,905; Referee: Serdar Gözübüyük (Netherlands)

8 October 2016 2018 FIFA World Cup qualification	Poland	3–2	Denmark	National Stadium, Warsaw
20:45 CEST (UTC+2)	Lewandowski 20', 36' (pen.), 48'; Cionek (yellow card) 53'	Report	Schmeichel (yellow card) 36'; Glik 49' (o.g.); Eriksen (yellow card) 62'; Poulsen 69'	Attendance: 56,811; Referee: Gianluca Rocchi (Italy)

11 October 2016 2018 FIFA World Cup qualification	Poland	2–1	Armenia	National Stadium, Warsaw
20:45 CEST (UTC+2)	Cionek (yellow card) 35'; Mkoyan 48' (o.g.); Błaszczykowski (yellow card) 87'; Lewandowski 90+5'	Report	Andonian (yellow card) 28' (yellow-red card) 30'; Pizzelli 50'; Beglaryan (yellow card) 73'; Mkoyan (yellow card) 85'	Attendance: 44,786; Referee: Ivan Kružliak (Slovakia)

11 November 2016 2018 FIFA World Cup qualification	Romania	0–3	Poland	Arena Națională, Bucharest
20:45 CET (UTC+1)	Benzar (yellow card) 52'; Săpunaru (yellow card) 68'; Andone (yellow card) 79'	Report (FIFA); Report (UEFA)	Grosicki 11'; Lewandowski 83', 90+1' (pen.)	Attendance: 48,531; Referee: Damir Skomina (Slovenia)

14 November 2016 Friendly	Poland	1–1	Slovenia	Stadion Miejski, Wrocław
20:45 CET (UTC+1)	Pazdan (yellow card) 76'; Teodorczyk 79'	Report	Mevlja 24'; Zajc (yellow card) 30'; Krhin (yellow card) 70'	Attendance: 40,119; Referee: Björn Kuipers (Netherlands)

26 March 2017 2018 FIFA World Cup qualification	Montenegro	1–2	Poland	Stadion pod Goricom, Podgorica
20:45 CEST (UTC+2)	Savić (yellow card) 39'; Mugoša (yellow card) 40', (goal) 63'; Vešović (yellow card) 42'; Šofranac (yellow card) 48'	Report	Lewandowski 40'; Glik (yellow card) 69'; Piszczek 82'	Attendance: 10,439; Referee: Viktor Kassai (Hungary)

10 June 2017 2018 FIFA World Cup qualification	Poland	3–1	Romania	National Stadium, Warsaw
20:45 CEST (UTC+2)	Lewandowski 29' (pen.), 57', 62' (pen.)	Report	Săpunaru (yellow card) 28'; Stancu 77'	Attendance: 57,128; Referee: Ruddy Buquet (France)
