= Urbańczyk =

Urbańczyk is a Polish patronymic surname derived from the given name Urban. Notable people with the surname include:

- Aleksandra Urbańczyk (born 1987), Polish swimmer
- Elżbieta Urbańczyk (born 1971), Polish sprint canoeist
- Klaus Urbanczyk (born 1940), East German footballer and manager
- Maciej Urbańczyk (born 1996), Polish footballer
- Przemysław Urbańczyk (born 1951), Polish archaeologist
- Stanisław Urbańczyk (1909–2001), Polish linguist and academic
