= Aleksandar Todorovski =

Macedonian footballer

Personal information
- Full name: Aleksandar Todorovski
- Date of birth: 26 February 1984 (age 42)
- Place of birth: Kraljevo, SFR Yugoslavia
- Height: 1.81 m (5 ft 11 in)
- Position: Right-back

Team information
- Current team: Hajduk Beška

Senior career*
Years	Team	Apps	(Gls)
2002–2005	Radnički Beograd	49	(1)
2005–2006	APOEL	3	(0)
2006–2007	Digenis Morphou	25	(0)
2007–2008	AEL Limassol	14	(0)
2008–2011	Rad	63	(0)
2011–2013	Polonia Warsaw	41	(2)
2013–2015	Sturm Graz	28	(0)
2015–2018	Zagłębie Lubin	74	(0)
2018–2020	Radnički Niš	55	(0)
2020–2022	Grafičar Beograd	45	(0)
2022–2023	Kačer Belanovica		
2023–	Hajduk Beška		

International career
2002	FR Yugoslavia U19 (Note: Only official UEFA matches included)	2	(0)
2010–2015	Macedonia	16	(0)
- * Club domestic league appearances and goals as of 25 February 2024

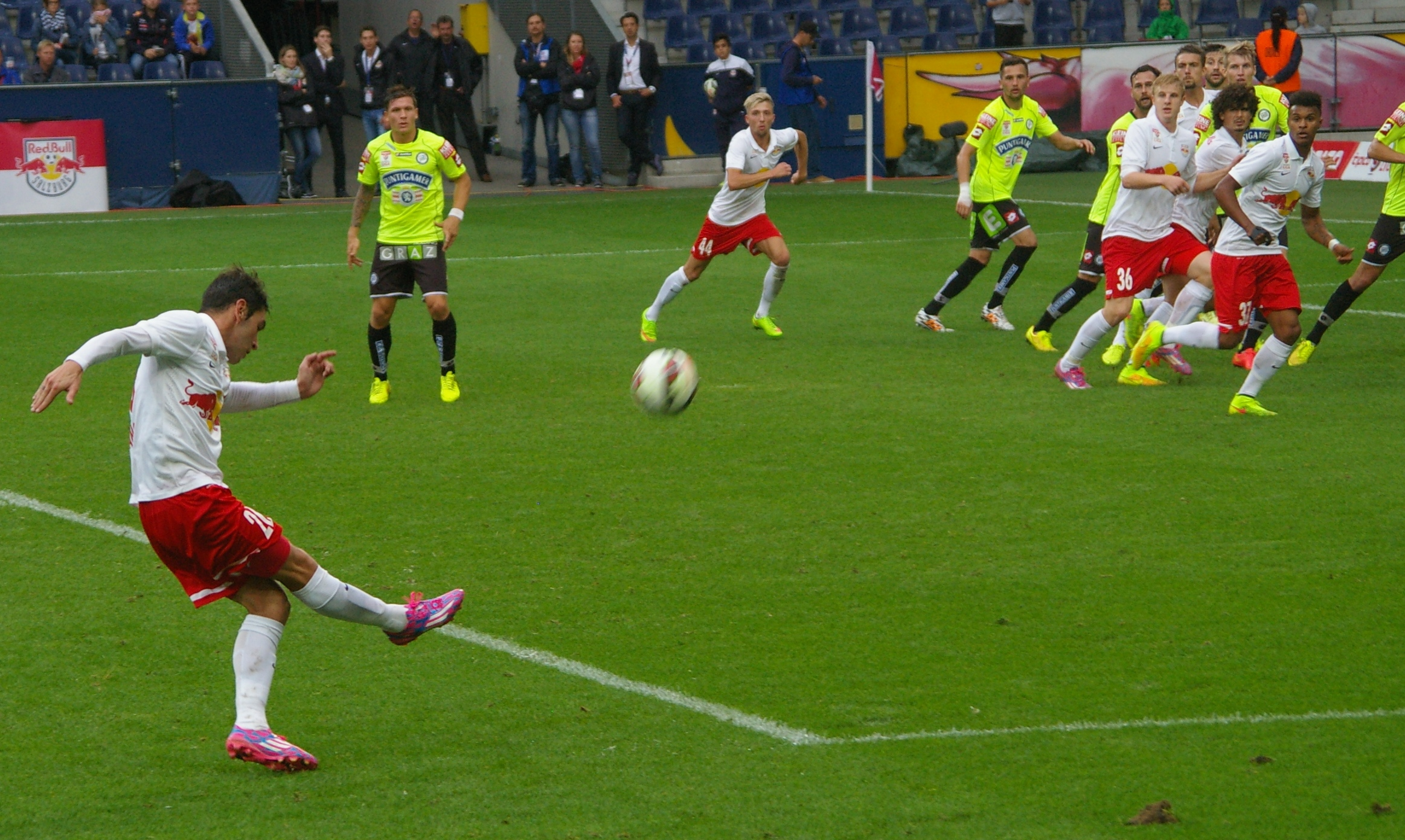
Todorovski playing for RB Salzburg.

Aleksandar Todorovski (Macedonian: Александар Тодоровски; born 26 February 1984) is a Serbian-born Macedonian professional footballer who plays as a defender for Hajduk Beška.

== Club career ==
Todorovski started out at Radnički Beograd in 2002. He made 10 appearances in the 2004–05 First League of Serbia and Montenegro. In 2005, Todorovski moved abroad to Cyprus and joined APOEL. He also played for Digenis Akritas and AEL Limassol, before returning to Serbia in 2008.

After spending three seasons at Rad, Todorovski moved abroad for the second time and signed with Polish club Polonia Warsaw in 2011. He was acquired by Austrian side Sturm Graz in June 2013. In early 2015, Todorovski returned to Poland and joined Zagłębie Lubin.

In June 2018, Todorovski returned to Serbia and joined Radnički Niš. Todorovski extended his contract with Radnički Niš in June 2019.

== International career ==
In 2002, Todorovski represented FR Yugoslavia at under-19 level. He, however, accepted a call-up to represent Macedonia in early 2010. During his five-year international career, between 2010 and 2015, Todorovski was capped 16 times for the Macedonia national team. His final international was a June 2015 European Championship qualification match away against Slovakia.

== Honours ==
Zagłębie Lubin

- I liga: 2014–15

Zagłębie Lubin II

- IV liga Lower Silesia West: 2016–17
