= Guilherme (footballer, born May 1991) =

Brazilian footballer

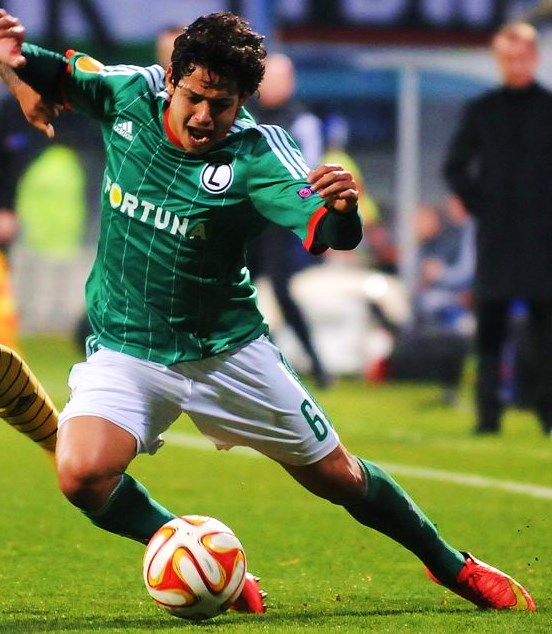
- Guilherme with Legia Warsaw

Personal information
- Full name: Guilherme Costa Marques
- Date of birth: 21 May 1991 (age 35)
- Place of birth: Três Rios, Brazil
- Height: 1.74 m (5 ft 9 in)
- Position: Midfielder

Team information
- Current team: Atlético Goianiense

Youth career
- 2008–2009: Paraíba do Sul
- 2009–2010: Braga

Senior career*
Years	Team	Apps	(Gls)
2010–2015	Braga	5	(1)
2010–2011	→ Vizela (loan)	7	(0)
2011–2012	→ Gil Vicente (loan)	19	(0)
2012–2013	Braga B	27	(4)
2013–2015	→ Legia Warsaw (loan)	8	(0)
2015–2018	Legia Warsaw	91	(14)
2018	Benevento	12	(2)
2018–2021	GDSC Alvarenga	0	(0)
2018–2019	→ Yeni Malatyaspor (loan)	30	(5)
2019–2020	→ Yeni Malatyaspor (loan)	18	(5)
2020	→ Trabzonspor (loan)	16	(0)
2020–2021	→ Göztepe (loan)	10	(2)
2021–2022	Guangzhou City	32	(11)
2023	Goiás	30	(6)
2024–2025	Changchun Yatai	12	(3)
2025	Mirassol	12	(2)
2026–	Atlético Goianiense	14	(4)
- * Club domestic league appearances and goals as of 16 April 2026

Guilherme Costa Marques (born 21 May 1991), known simply as Guilherme, is a Brazilian professional footballer who plays as a midfielder for Campeonato Brasileiro Série B club Atlético Goianiense.

== Career ==
=== Braga ===
Born in Três Rios, Brazil, Guilherme began playing futsal and trained at a football school, having started out playing in the streets. He started out playing in five-a-side before switching to eleven-a-side. As Guilherme grew older, he began to take football seriously. Guilherme then started out his career at Paraíba do Sul before moving to Portugal, where he joined Braga in 2009 at age sixteen. Immediately after joining the club, Guilherme was assigned to the youth team.

Guilherme made his SC Braga first team debut on 24 January 2010, starting the whole game, in a 4–1 win over Leiria. He also appeared as an unused substitute in a league match against Vitória on 6 March 2010. For the remaining part of the 2009–10 season, Guilherme appeared in a number of matches as an unused substitute, as he made one appearance for the side.

Ahead of the 2010–11 season, Guilherme was promoted to Braga's senior squad. His first appearance of the season came on 21 August 2010, coming on as a second–half substitute, in a 0–0 draw against Vitória. On 22 January 2011, he scored his first goal of the season, in a 2–2 draw against Vitória. Eight days later, on 30 January 2011, Guilherme scored again in the third round of Taça da Liga, in a 4–0 win over Arouca. At the end of the 2010–11 season, he went on to make eight appearances and scoring once in all competitions. During the season, Guilherme was linked a move away from SC Braga, as Juventus, Manchester City and FC Barcelona were interested in signing him.

Guilherme made his first appearance of the 2011–12 season against BSC Young Boys in the second leg of the UEFA Europa League qualifying play-off round on 25 August 2011, where he came on as a 61st-minute substitute and set up a goal for Lima in a 2–2 draw and saw SC Braga go through to the Group Stage, thanks to away goal. After spending the 2011–12 season on loan at Gil Vicente, Guilherme was sent to the Braga B team for the whole 2012–13 season. At Braga B team, he received a handful of playing time despite being called up from the senior team. However, Guilherme had discipline issues, receiving thirteen yellow card and two red cards, coming against Tondela and F.C. Penafiel on 2 September 2012 and 7 October 2012 respectively. Despite this, he went on to make twenty–six appearances and scoring four times for Braga B team.

It was announced on 19 June 2013 that Guilherme's future at the SC Braga was in doubt, as his homeland clubs were becoming more interested in signing him. After a failed move, he spent the rest of the year, training for the reserve side. It was announced on 10 January 2014 that Guilherme was expected to leave SC Braga, either having his contract terminated or on loan.

==== Loan spells from Braga ====
In the first part of the following season, Guilherme was loaned to Segunda Liga side Vizela. He went on to make seven appearances for the side.

For the 2011–12 season, Guilherme was loaned out to Gil Vicente for the rest of the season. He made his debut for the club, coming on as a second-half substitute, in a 2–2 draw against Olhanense on 16 September 2011. A month later on 27 October 2011, he scored his first Gil Vicente goal, coming from a penalty spot, in a 2–1 loss against Belenenses in the Taça da Liga campaign. Guilherme appeared in the Taça da Liga final against S.L. Benfica, coming on as a 67th-minute substitute, as the club went on to lose 2–1. At the end of the 2011–12 season, he went on to make twenty–six appearances and scoring once in all competitions.

=== Legia Warsaw ===
On 14 January 2014, it was announced that Guilherme was loaned out to Legia Warsaw for the next twelve months. Upon joining the club, Guilherme became the twelve Brazilian player to join Legia Warsaw.

Guilherme made his Legia Warsaw debut on 14 February 2014, starting the match before being substituted in the 74th minute, in a 1–0 win over Korona Kielce. After making his second appearance for the club, he, however, suffered a ruptured intraarticular ligament initiation in the ankle that saw him out until the end of the 2013–14 season. By the time he suffered a rupture to his ankle, Guilherme went on to make two appearances for the side this season. Despite this, he went on to win February's Player of the Month by Legia Warsaw supporters. During his absent from injury, the club went on to win the league.

At the start of the 2014–15 season, Guilherme remained out of the first team, due to suffering from injury. On 17 October 2014, he returned from injury, coming on as a 78th-minute substitute, as Legia Warsaw beat Lechia Gdańsk 1–0. Four days later, on 22 October 2014, Guilherme made his first start as a left–back since returning from injury, in a 1–0 win over Metalist Kharkiv in the group stage of the UEFA Europa League. Since returning to the first team from injury, he regained his first team place, playing in the left–back position. On 14 January 2015, it was announced that Guilherme signed for Legia Warsaw on a permanent basis, signing a three–year contract. After losing his place by the returning Tomasz Brzyski, he regained his first team place, playing in the attacking position, although he occasionally played at the left–back position. On 29 April 2015, Guilherme scored his first goal for the club, scoring from an equaliser, in a 2–1 win against Pogoń Szczecin. Three days later, on 2 May 2015, he started in the Polish Cup final against Lech Poznań (who went on to win the league), only for him to be substituted in the 37th minute, as Legia Warsaw won 2–1. Despite being sidelined several times later in the 2014–15 season, Guilherme went on to make thirty appearances and scoring once for the side.

At the start of the 2015–16 season, Guilherme remained in the first team regular for the side, where he played in the right–wing position despite competing with Michał Kucharczyk. He scored his first goal of the season in the second leg of the UEFA Europa League third round against FC Botoșani, as Legia Warsaw won 3–0 to advance to the next round. A month later on 27 August 2015, Guilherme scored his second goal of the season in the second leg of the UEFA Europa League play–offs round against Zorya Luhansk, as the club won 3–2 to advance to the Group Stage. Three days later on 30 August 2015, he scored the opening goal of the game, in a 1–1 draw against Jagiellonia Białystok. On 31 October 2015, Guilherme scored his fourth goal of the season, in a 3–1 win against Lechia Gdańsk. On 20 December 2015, he scored his fifth goal of the season, as well as, providing two assists, in a 3–1 win against Korona Kielce. His performance at Legia Warsaw attracted interests from Serie A side Inter Milan, but the move never happened. After being sidelined on two separate matches between late–February and early–March, Guilherme scored on his return from injury, in a 2–1 win over KS Cracovia on 12 March 2016. In the second leg of the semi–final of the Polish Cup against Zawisza Bydgoszcz on 6 April 2016, he came on as a 52nd-minute substitute and scored the winning goal, in a 2–1 win to reach the final for the second time in a row. In the Polish Cup final against Lech Poznań, Guilherme came on as a 67th-minute substitute and helped Legia Warsaw win 1–0 to win the tournament. Six days later on 8 May 2016, he scored his eighth goal of the season, in a 4–0 win against Piast Gliwice. In a follow–up match against Pogoń Szczecin, Guilherme set up the third of the game to help club win 3–0, a win that saw the club win the league. At the end of the 2015–16 season, he went on to make 55 appearances and scoring 8 times in all competitions.

At the start of the 2016–17 season, Guilherme scored Legia Warsaw's first goal of the season, in a 4–1 loss against Lech Poznań in the Polish SuperCup. However, he soon suffered a shoulder injury during a 2–0 win over Zrinjski Mostar in the second leg of the UEFA Champions League second round and was sidelined for a month. After being out for a month, Guilherme returned from injury on 20 August 2016 against Arka Gdynia, coming on as a second-half substitute and set up a goal for Kasper Hämäläinen, in a 3–1 loss. Since returning from a shoulder injury, he regained his first team place, playing in the right–wing position. On 1 October 2016, Guilherme scored a brace, scoring the club's first and second goals of the game, in a 3–0 win over Lechia Gdańsk. On 28 October 2016, he played a role in the match by scoring Legia Warsaw's first goal of the game and set up the club's second goal of the game, in a 4–2 win against Arka Gdynia. On 18 November 2016, Guilherme scored his fifth goal of the season, in a 4–2 win against Jagiellonia Białystok. On 7 December 2016, he scored his first UEFA Champions League goal, in a 1–0 win over Sporting CP, their first win of the UEFA Champions League's Group Stage. However, Guilherme suffered both suspension and a thigh injury that saw him out for two months. While out with a thigh injury, Legia Warsaw opened a contract negotiation to convince him to stay at the club beyond 2018, whose contract was expected to expire. On 11 February 2017, he returned from injury, coming on as a 76th-minute substitute, in a 1–0 win against Arka Gdynia. However, his return was short–lived when Guilherme missed one match, due to suspension for picking up five yellow cards this season. After serving a one match suspension, he returned to the starting line–up, in a 2–1 win against KS Cracovia on 22 April 2017. On 14 May 2017, Guilherme scored his seventh goal of the season and set up one of the goals, in a 6–0 win against Bruk-Bet Termalica Nieciecza. In the last game of the season against Lechia Gdańsk, he started the whole game, in a 0–0 draw, a result that saw club won the league for the second time in a row. At the end of the 2016–17 season, Guilherme went on to make forty–one appearances and scoring seven times in all competitions.

Ahead of the 2017–18 season, Guilherme was linked away from Legia Warsaw, as Sporting CP and Trabzonspor were among interested, but he stayed at the club. In the Polish SuperCup against Arka Gdynia on 7 July 2017, Guilherme started the match and set up the equalising goal for Thibault Moulin to score; leading the match to extra–time and penalty shoot–out, where he successfully converted the shootout, but Legia Warsaw lost 4–3 in the penalty shoot–out. Guilherme then scored in both legs of the UEFA Champions League second round qualification against IFK Mariehamn, as the club won 9–0 on aggregate to advance to the next round. However, he was out for a month after suffering a knee injury during a 1–1 draw against Sheriff Tiraspol in a UEFA Europa League Play–Off Round match in the first leg. On 1 October 2017, Guilherme returned from injury, coming on as a second-half substitute, in a 3–0 loss against Lech Poznan. He scored on 9 December 2017 and 12 December 2017 against Bruk-Bet Termalica Nieciecza and Piast Gliwice respectively. It was announced on 8 December 2017 that Guilherme did not sign a new contract with Legia Warsaw and expected to leave the club when the transfer window opens next month. His last appearance, which also coincidentally turns out to be his 150th appearance for Legia Warsaw, came on 16 December 2017, in a 2–0 loss against Wisła Płock. After the match, he made a farewell statements, thanking the club during his four years spell there. By the time he departed the club, Guilherme's contribution to the club winning the league this season, where he made 22 appearances and scoring five times, earned him a medal.

During his time at Legia Warsaw, Guilherme made 150 appearances and scoring 21 times, as he helped the side win the Polish Cup on two occasions and the league on three occasions. He was also the club's fan favourite, due to his dribbling and shooting skills.

=== Benevento ===
With his contract not being renewed, Guilherme was linked a move to Serie A side Benevento, who was at 20th place at the time, and was looking for reinforcements to help the side avoid relegation. On 16 December 2017, Italian media Tutto Mercato Web reported that Guilherme agreed a deal to join the club. However, his move to Benevento was delayed over paperwork issues. Eventually, it was announced on 19 January 2018 that he joined Benevento.

Guilherme made his Benevento debut against Bologna, starting the whole game, in a 3–0 loss on 21 January 2018. After his making his debut, Eurosport gave Guilherme's performance 6/10, commenting: "Encouraging the performance of the last arrived; in the first part of the race he sows panic in the opposing defence." On 11 February 2018, Guilherme scored his first goal for the club, in a 5–2 loss against Roma. A month later on 31 March 2018, he scored again, which saw Benevento lost 6–2 loss against Lazio. However, Guilherme suffered ankle injury during a 2–2 draw against Sassuolo on 15 April 2018 and was expected to be out for the rest of the season. While on the sidelines, the club were relegated to Serie B after spending one season at Serie A. But he made his return from injury in the last game of the season against Chievo, starting the whole game, in a 1–0 loss. During the second half of the 2017–18 season, Guilherme made twelve appearances with two times in league competition.

Following the club's relegation, Guilherme was linked a move away from Benevento despite being keen on playing in Serie B next season.

=== Alvarenga ===
On 1 July 2018, Guilherme joined Portuguese club GD Santa Cruz Alvarenga.

==== Yeni Malatyaspor (first loan spell) ====
It was announced on 4 August 2018 that Guilherme joined Yeni Malatyaspor on a season–long deal for the 2018–19 season.

Guilherme made his Yeni Malatyaspor debut, starting a match and played 81 minutes before being substituted, in a 3–1 win over Göztepe in the opening game of the season. In a follow-up match against Fenerbahçe, he set up a goal for Danijel Aleksić to score the only goal in the game, in a 1–0 win. On 15 September 2018, Guilherme scored his first goal for the club, in a 2–1 loss against Beşiktaş. Then, on 9 November 2018, he scored a brace and set up two of the club's other three goals, in a 5–0 win over Trabzonspor. Since joining the club, he quickly established himself in the starting eleven and impressed the management with his display. However in late–November, Guilherme suffered an injury that saw him out for one match. On 3 December 2018, he made his return from injury, starting the whole game, in a 1–1 draw against Akhisarspor. However, his return was short–lived when he missed one match, due to picking up five yellow cards so far this season. On 23 December 2018, Guilherme scored an equalising goal, only for him to be sent–off for a second bookable offence, in a 1–1 draw against Bursaspor on 23 December 2018. However, he spent the beginning of January on the sideline, due to injury and suspension. On 28 January 2019, Guilherme returned to the starting line–up, in a 3–2 loss against Fenerbahçe. In the quarter–finals of Turkish Cup against Göztepe, he played in both legs, which the match played all the way to penalty shootout and scored in the shootout, as Yeni Malatyaspor won 5–3 to advance to the next round. On 17 March 2019, Guilherme scored his fifth goal for the club, in a 3–1 win against Ankaragücü. At the end of the 2018–19 season, he went on to make thirty–five appearances and scoring five times in all competitions. Following this, Guilherme returned to his parent club.

==== Yeni Malatyaspor (second loan spell) ====
On 18 July 2019, Guilherme rejoined Yeni Malatyaspor for the second time on loan for the 2019–20 season.

He made his second debut for the club, starting the whole game, in a 2–2 draw against Olimpija Ljubljana in the first leg of the UEFA Europa League Second qualifying round. In a follow–up match, Guilherme came on as a 60th-minute substitute and helped Yeni Malatyaspor win 1–0 to advance to the next round. In the opening game of the season, he scored his first goal of the season and set up the club's second goal of the game, in a 3–0 win against İstanbul Başakşehir. Guilherme scored on 15 September 2019 and 22 September 2019 against Ankaragücü and Galatasaray respectively. On 4 October 2019, he set up two goals, in a 5–1 win against Denizlispor. This was followed up by scoring his fourth goal of the season, in a 2–0 win against Konyaspor. Since joining Yeni Malatyaspor, Guilherme continued to regain his place in the first team. He then scored three more goals throughout December, including scoring in both legs against Ankara Keçiörengücü in the Turkish Cup. By the time Guilherme left the club, he made twenty–seven appearances and scoring seven times in all competitions.

==== Trabzonspor (loan) ====
On 31 January 2020, Guilherme joined Trabzonspor on loan for the remainder of the 2019–20 season. He was previously linked with a move to Beşiktaş and Fenerbahçe. On 12 January 2020, Guilherme was expected to move to Beşiktaş but he would have to take a pay cut to join the club. However, his move to Beşiktaş broke down, due to the club's limited spending.

Guilherme made his debut for the club, coming on as a second-half substitute, in a 2–1 win against Fenerbahçe on 1 February 2020. In a follow–up match against Erzurumspor in the first leg of the Turkish Cup quarter–finals, he set up a goal, in a 5–0 win. In the return leg, Guilherme scored a brace, in a 4–1 win to advance to the semi–finals. However, the season was interrupted by COVID-19 pandemic. Once the season resumed behind closed doors, he returned to the first team on 12 June 2020 against Göztepe, only for him to be sent–off for a second bookable, in a 3–1 win. After serving a one match suspension, Guilherme returned to the starting line–up, in a 2–2 draw against Alanyaspor on 22 June 2020. In the Turkish Cup final against Alanyaspor, he started the whole game and helped Trabzonspor win 2–0 to win the tournament. At the end of the 2019–20 season, Guilherme went on to make eighteen appearances and scoring two times in all competitions.

In the 2020–21 season, Guilherme made two appearances for Trabzonspor. On 1 October 2020, his loan spell at Trabzonspor was terminated.

==== Göztepe (loan) ====
On 1 October 2020, Göztepe signed Guilherme on a two-year loan with an option to buy.

He made his debut for the club, coming on as a second-half substitute, in a 0–0 draw against İstanbul Başakşehir on 3 October 2020. In a follow–up match, Guilherme scored a brace, in a 3–2 loss against Fenerbahçe. By the time he left Göztepe Göztepe, Guilherme went on to make eleven appearances and scoring three times in all competitions.

=== Guangzhou City ===
On 1 March 2021, Guilherme signed Chinese Super League club Guangzhou City on a three-year deal.

He made his debut for the club, starting the whole game, and set up a goal for Ye Chugui, in a 2–2 draw against Guangzhou Evergrande in the opening game of the season. In a follow–up match, Guilherme scored a brace and set up one of the goals, in a 3–1 win against Chongqing Liangjiang Athletic. Since joining Guangzhou City, he became a first team regular at the club, playing in the winger position. However, Guilherme acknowledged his tight schedule affected his form. On 24 July 2021, he scored his second goal for Guangzhou City, in a 3–3 draw against Guangzhou Evergrande. A week later on 31 July 2021, Guilherme scored for the second time this season against Chongqing Liangjiang Athletic, in a 4–2 win. On 8 August 2021, he scored his fifth goal of the season, in a 3–1 loss against Shandong Taishan. Following this, Guilherme did not play for the rest of the 2021 season., due to being deregistered by the club. At the end of the 2021 season, he made fourteen appearances and scoring five times in all competitions.

The start of the 2022 season continued to see Guilherme out of the first team, due to being deregistered again and his own injury concerns. He was linked with a move away from Guangzhou City, with Yeni Malatyaspor keen on re-signing him, but the move never happened. In July 2022, he was registered back to the club's first team. On 27 August 2022, Guilherme made his first appearance of the season, setting up Guangzhou City's only goal of the game, in a 2–1 loss against Chengdu Rongcheng. Following his return, he became a first team regular, playing in the winger position. On 3 November 2022, Guilherme scored his first goal of the season, in a 4–1 loss against Wuhan Three Towns. Three weeks later on 21 November 2022, he scored his second goal of the season, in a 2–1 loss against Beijing Guoan. Guilherme scored on 14 December 2022, 23 December 2022 and 27 December 2022 against Shanghai Shenhua, Hebei (twice) and Shenzhen respectively, as Guangzhou City were relegated to China League One. Despite this, he finished the 2022 season, making eighteen appearances and scoring six times in all competitions.

The club was dissolved in March 2023, making all players – including Guilherme – all free agents.

=== Goiás ===
On 13 April 2023, Guilherme returned to Brazil and signed a with Campeonato Brasileiro Série A side Goiás. He was previously linked with a move to São Paulo and SC Internacional.

Two days later on 15 April 2023, Guilherme made his debut for the club, coming on as a 77th-minute substitute, in a 2–0 loss against Club Athletico Paranaense. However, during a match against SE Palmeiras on 7 May 2023, he suffered a foot injury and was substituted in the 43rd minute, as Goiás loss 5–0. After the match, Guilherme had a surgery on his foot and was out throughout May. On 4 June 2023, he made his return from injury, coming on as an 80th-minute substitute, in a 1–0 loss against Cuiabá. Guilherme then scored his first goal for the club, in a 2–1 win against Independiente Santa Fe in the Copa Sudamericana. A week later on 9 July 2023 against Santos, he scored a brace, only for him to be sent–off in the last minute of the game, as Goiás loss 4–3.

After serving a one match suspension, Guilherme returned to the starting line–up, in a 1–0 win against Cruzeiro on 23 July 2023. A month later on 26 August 2023, he scored his fourth goal of the season, in 1–1 draw against Corinthians. After serving a one match suspension due to picking up five yellow cards, Guilherme returned to the starting line–up, in a 0–0 draw against Flamengo on 20 September 2023. Two weeks later on 7 October 2023, he scored another brace, in a 6–4 loss against Esporte Clube Bahia. Two weeks later on 21 October 2023, Guilherme scored his seventh goal of the season, in a 1–1 draw against Cuiabá. After serving a one match suspension, he returned to the starting line–up, in a 1–0 loss against Cruzeiro on 27 November 2023. Three days later on 30 November 2023, Goiás were relegated to Campeonato Brasileiro Série B after losing 2–1 loss against Grêmio. At the end of the 2023 season, Guilherme made thirty–five appearances and scoring seven times in all competitions.

Following the club's relegation, Guilherme's future at Goiás became uncertain.

=== Changchun Yatai ===
On 7 February 2024, Guilherme returned to China and signed a with Chinese Super League club Changchun Yatai.

He made his debut for the club, starting the whole game, in a 4–2 away defeat against Shandong Taishan in the opening game of the season on 1 March 2024. In a follow–up match on 8 March 2024, Guilherme scored his first goal for Yatai in a 1–0 away win against Qingdao Hainiu. A month later on 14 April 2024, he scored his second goal for the club, in a 2–1 loss against Chengdu Rongcheng. However, Guilherme suffered an injury that saw him out for one match. But on 26 April 2024, he made his return from injury, coming on as a 60th-minute substitute, in a 1–0 loss against Meizhou Hakka. On 17 May 2024, Guilherme scored his third goal for Changchun Yatai, in a 3–2 win against Beijing Guoan. However, he suffered a cruciate ligament injury during training and was out for the rest of the 2024 season. At the end of the 2024 season, Guilherme went on to make twelve appearances and scoring three times in all competitions.

On 29 May 2025, Guilherme's contract with Changchun Yatai was terminated by mutual consent, having made no appearances for the club this season.

=== Mirassol ===
On 8 September 2025, Guilherme joined Campeonato Brasileiro Série A side Mirassol for the rest of the 2025 season. He scored 2 goals in 12 appearances, as the São Paulo-based club, as the club finished in an historic fourth place in the Série A table, qualifying for the Copa Libertadores.

=== Atlético Goianiense ===
In January 2026, after leaving Mirassol, Guilherme joined Série B club Atlético Goianiense on a one-year contract.

== Style of play ==
Guilherme plays in an offensive midfielder and prefers to play in the middle position. Goal.com said about Guilherme, commenting: "he's a Brazilian of great creativity and imagination, able to make himself valuable for his team with a play of class or a winning assist for his teammate".

During his early career at Legia Warsaw, Guilherme also played in the left–back position, reflecting: "At this point I focus on the left defense, because I'm needed there. Therefore, I listen to many comments, watch matches, analyzing the players' play in this position. For sure, the fact that I'm doing so well on left defense is caused by the help of the training staff. There really was no conversation with the trainer about the game on the left defense."

== Personal life ==
Guilherme mentioned in an interview with Gol 24 that he has a wife, implying that he's married. During the same interview, he's currently learning Polish and spoke English and occasionally Portuguese when he was at Legia Warsaw. Having spent four years in Poland, he applied for the Polish Citizenship to help the club reduce the limit of foreigners in the league. In February 2018, Guilherme became a first time father.

Growing up in Três Rios, Brazil, Guilherme revealed that he stayed all day on the pitch that "sometime his mother came for me because I forgot about the dinner". Although he described his mother as "strict", due to the fact that "she did not always like that him spending so much time playing football" and "demanding", she, nevertheless, supported him. He also grew up supporting Flamengo. He also have a tattoo that said: "Minha Família é minha vida" (translated "My family is my life") in his right arm. Guilherme also has a brother.

== Career statistics ==
As of match played 6 December 2025

Appearances and goals by club, season and competition
Club	Season	League			State league		National cup (Note: Includes Taça de Portugal, Polish Cup, Turkish Cup)		League cup		Continental		Other		Total	
Club	Season	Division	Apps	Goals	Apps	Goals	Apps	Goals	Apps	Goals	Apps	Goals	Apps	Goals	Apps	Goals
Braga	2009–10	Primeira Liga	0	0	—		0	0	1 (Note: Appearance(s) in Taça da Liga)	0	—		—		1	0
Braga	2010–11	Primeira Liga	5	1	—		2	0	1	1	—		—		8	2
Braga	2011–12	Primeira Liga	0	0	—		0	0	—		1 (Note: Appearance(s) in UEFA Europa League)	0	—		1	0
Braga	Total		5	1	—		2	0	2	1	1	0	—		10	2
Gil Vicente (loan)	2011–12	Primeira Liga	19	0	—		1	0	6	1	—		—		26	1
Braga B (loan)	2012–13	Segunda Liga	27	4	—		0	0	—		—		—		27	4
Legia Warsaw	2013–14	Ekstraklasa	2	0	—		0	0	—		—		—		2	0
Legia Warsaw	2014–15	Ekstraklasa	18	1	—		6	0	—		6	0	0	0	30	1
Legia Warsaw	2015–16	Ekstraklasa	35	5	—		7	1	—		12	2	1 (Note: Appearance in Polish Super Cup)	0	55	8
Legia Warsaw	2016–17	Ekstraklasa	29	5	—		0	0	—		11 (Note: Nine appearances and one goal in UEFA Champions League, two appearances in UEFA Europa League)	1	1	1	41	7
Legia Warsaw	2017–18	Ekstraklasa	15	3	—		1	0	—		5 (Note: Four appearances and two goals in UEFA Champions League, one appearance in UEFA Europa League)	2	1	0	22	5
Legia Warsaw	Total		99	14	—		14	1	—		34	5	3	1	150	21
Benevento	2017–18	Serie A	12	2	—		0	0	—		—		—		12	2
Yeni Malatyaspor (loan)	2018–19	Süper Lig	30	5	—		5	0	—		—		—		35	5
Yeni Malatyaspor (loan)	2019–20	Süper Lig	18	5	—		4	2	—		4	0	—		26	7
Yeni Malatyaspor (loan)	Total		48	10	—		9	2	—		4	0	—		61	12
Trabzonspor (loan)	2019–20	Süper Lig	14	0	—		4	2	—		—		—		18	2
Trabzonspor (loan)	2020–21	Süper Lig	2	0	—		0	0	—		—		—		2	0
Trabzonspor (loan)	Total		16	0	—		4	2	—		—		—		20	2
Göztepe (loan)	2020–21	Süper Lig	10	2	—		1	1	—		—		—		11	3
Guangzhou City	2021	Chinese Super League	14	5	—		0	0	—		—		—		14	5
Guangzhou City	2022	Chinese Super League	18	6	—		0	0	—		—		—		18	6
Guangzhou City	Total		32	11	—		0	0	—		—		—		32	11
Goiás	2023	Série A	30	6	0	0	5	1	—		—		0	0	35	7
Changchun Yatai	2024	Chinese Super League	12	3	—		0	0	—		—		—		12	3
Mirassol	2025	Série A	12	2	—		—		—		—		—		12	2
Career total			322	57	0	0	36	7	8	2	39	5	3	1	408	70

== Honours ==
Legia Warsaw

- Ekstraklasa: 2013–14, 2015–16, 2016–17, 2017–18
- Polish Cup: 2014–15, 2015–16, 2017–18

Trabzonspor

- Turkish Cup: 2019–20
