= Maciej Dąbrowski =

Polish footballer (born 1987

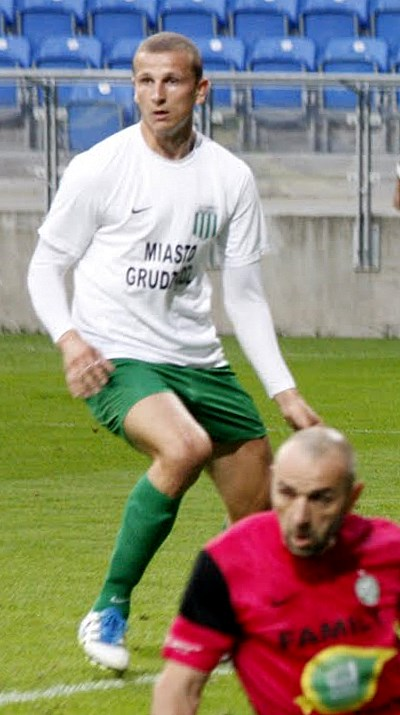
- Dąbrowski with Olimpia Grudziądz in 2011

Personal information
- Full name: Maciej Dąbrowski
- Date of birth: 20 April 1987 (age 39)
- Place of birth: Radziejów, Poland
- Height: 1.94 m (6 ft 4 in)
- Position: Centre-back

Team information
- Current team: Włókniarz Zelów
- Number: 9

Youth career
- Lubienianka Lubień Kujawski

Senior career*
Years	Team	Apps	(Gls)
2005–2006	Zawisza Bydgoszcz	0	(0)
2006–2007	Victoria Koronowo	11	(0)
2008	GKS Bełchatów	1	(0)
2009–2011	Zawisza Bydgoszcz	72	(9)
2011–2012	Olimpia Grudziądz	31	(4)
2012–2015	Pogoń Szczecin	70	(7)
2015	→ Zagłębie Lubin (loan)	14	(1)
2015–2016	Zagłębie Lubin	33	(4)
2016–2018	Legia Warsaw	27	(3)
2018–2019	Zagłębie Lubin	33	(0)
2020–2023	ŁKS Łódź	86	(2)
2023–2024	Lubienianka Lubień Kujawski	15	(18)
2024–	Włókniarz Zelów	16	(24)

International career
2007	Poland U20	3	(0)
- * Club domestic league appearances and goals as of 21:15, 30 June 2026 (UTC)

Maciej Dąbrowski (born 20 April 1987) is a Polish professional footballer who plays as a centre-back for regional league club Włókniarz Zelów.

== Club career ==
In July 2011, he joined Olimpia Grudziądz.

== International career ==
Dąbrowski participated in the 2007 FIFA U-20 World Cup.

== Career statistics ==
As of match played 4 October 2025

Appearances and goals by club, season and competition
Club	Season	League			Polish Cup		Europe		Other		Total	
Club	Season	Division	Apps	Goals	Apps	Goals	Apps	Goals	Apps	Goals	Apps	Goals
Victoria Koronowo	2006–07	III liga, gr. II	0	0	1	0	—		—		1	0
Victoria Koronowo	2007–08	III liga, gr. II	11	0	3	0	—		—		14	0
Victoria Koronowo	Total		11	0	4	0	—		—		15	0
GKS Bełchatów	2007–08	Ekstraklasa	1	0	0	0	—		—		1	0
Zawisza Bydgoszcz	2008–09	II liga West	9	1	0	0	—		—		9	1
Zawisza Bydgoszcz	2009–10	II liga West	33	3	0	0	—		—		33	3
Zawisza Bydgoszcz	2010–11	II liga West	30	5	2	0	—		—		32	5
Zawisza Bydgoszcz	Total		72	9	2	0	—		—		74	9
Olimpia Grudziądz	2011–12	I liga	31	4	0	0	—		—		31	4
Pogoń Szczecin	2012–13	Ekstraklasa	25	2	1	0	—		—		26	2
Pogoń Szczecin	2013–14	Ekstraklasa	31	3	0	0	—		—		31	3
Pogoń Szczecin	2014–15	Ekstraklasa	14	2	2	0	—		—		16	2
Pogoń Szczecin	Total		70	7	3	0	—		—		73	7
Zagłębie Lubin	2014–15	I liga	14	1	0	0	—		—		14	1
Zagłębie Lubin	2015–16	Ekstraklasa	30	3	3	0	—		—		33	3
Zagłębie Lubin	2016–17	Ekstraklasa	3	1	0	0	6 (Note: Appearances in UEFA Europa League)	1	—		9	2
Zagłębie Lubin	Total		47	5	3	0	6	1	—		56	6
Legia Warsaw	2016–17	Ekstraklasa	18	2	1	0	4 (Note: Two appearances in UEFA Champions League, two appearances in UEFA Europa League)	0	—		23	2
Legia Warsaw	2017–18	Ekstraklasa	9	1	4	1	5 (Note: Three appearances in UEFA Champions League, two appearances in UEFA Europa League)	0	1 (Note: Appearance in Polish Super Cup)	0	19	2
Legia Warsaw	Total		27	3	5	1	9	0	1	0	42	4
Legia Warsaw II	2016–17	III liga, gr. I	1	0	—		—		—		1	0
Zagłębie Lubin	2017–18	Ekstraklasa	6	0	—		—		—		6	0
Zagłębie Lubin	2018–19	Ekstraklasa	24	0	1	0	—		—		25	0
Zagłębie Lubin	2019–20	Ekstraklasa	3	0	3	1	—		—		6	1
Zagłębie Lubin	Total		33	0	4	1	—		—		37	1
Zagłębie Lubin II	2018–19	III liga, gr. III	1	0	—		—		—		1	0
ŁKS Łódź	2019–20	Ekstraklasa	15	0	—		—		—		15	0
ŁKS Łódź	2020–21	I liga	26	0	2	0	—		1 (Note: Appearance in I liga promotion play-offs)	0	29	0
ŁKS Łódź	2021–22	I liga	21	1	1	0	—		—		22	1
ŁKS Łódź	2022–23	I liga	23	1	1	0	—		—		24	1
ŁKS Łódź	Total		85	2	4	0	—		1	0	90	2
Lubienianka Lubień Kujawski	2023–24	Regional league	15	18	—		—		—		15	18
Włókniarz Zelów	2024–25	Regional league	14	23	—		—		—		14	23
Włókniarz Zelów	2025–26	Regional league	2	1	—		—		—		2	1
Włókniarz Zelów	Total		16	24	—		—		—		16	24
Career total			340	65	22	2	15	1	2	0	379	68

== Honours ==
Victoria Koronowo

- Polish Cup (Kuyavia-Pomerania regionals): 2006–07

Zagłębie Lubin

- I liga: 2014–15

Legia Warsaw

- Ekstraklasa: 2016–17, 2017–18
- Polish Cup: 2017–18

ŁKS Łódź

- I liga: 2022–23

Individual

- Ekstraklasa Defender of the Season: 2016–17
