= Jakub Rzeźniczak =

Polish footballer

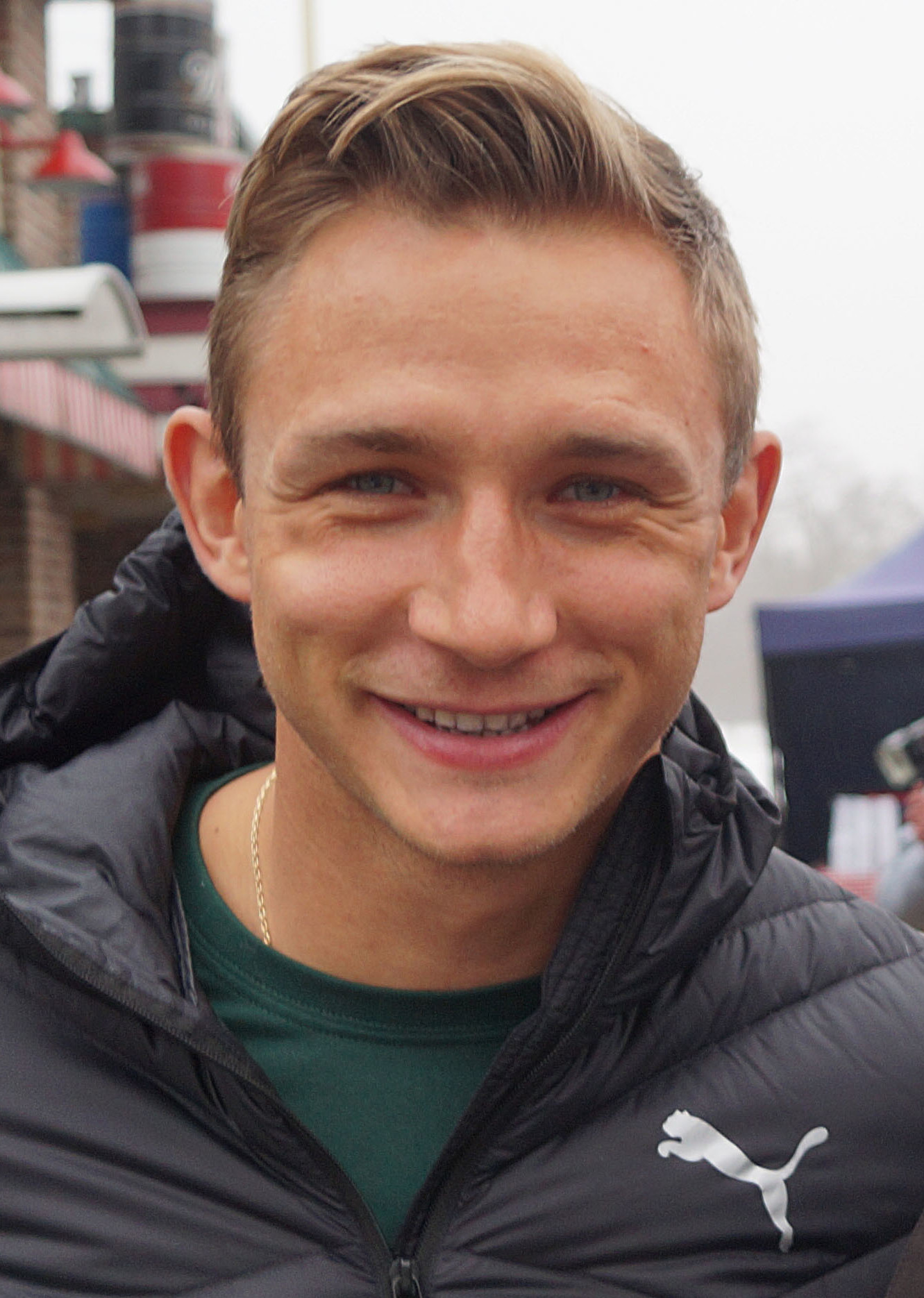

Personal information
- Full name: Jakub Rzeźniczak
- Date of birth: 26 October 1986 (age 40)
- Place of birth: Łódź, Poland
- Height: 1.83 m (6 ft 0 in)
- Position: Centre-back

Team information
- Current team: Football Campus Tomaszów Maz.

Youth career
- ŁKS Łódź
- 1996–2003: Widzew Łódź

Senior career*
Years	Team	Apps	(Gls)
2003–2004	Widzew Łódź	11	(0)
2004–2017	Legia Warsaw	249	(12)
2006–2007	→ Widzew Łódź (loan)	25	(0)
2017–2019	Qarabağ	25	(1)
2019–2023	Wisła Płock	90	(3)
2023–2024	Kotwica Kołobrzeg	16	(0)
2025	Stal Kraśnik	11	(0)
2025–2026	Mazur Radzymin	10	(0)
2026–	Football Campus Tomaszów Maz.	0	(0)

International career
2004–2008	Poland U21	16	(0)
2008–2014	Poland	9	(0)
- * Club domestic league appearances and goals as of 17:18, 30 June 2026 (UTC)

Jakub Rzeźniczak (born 26 October 1986) is a Polish professional footballer who plays as a centre-back for Klasa A club Football Campus Tomaszów Mazowiecki. Besides Poland, he has played in Azerbaijan.

== Club career ==
During his first couple of seasons at Legia Warsaw, Rzeźniczak struggled with consistency, and was eventually loaned out to Widzew Łódź, where he spent the 2006–07 season. He returned to Legia the next season and eventually became a regular starter.

On 6 July 2017, Rzeźniczak signed a two-year contract with Azerbaijani club Qarabağ. Rzeźniczak was released by Qarabağ at the end of his contract.

Ahead of the 2019–20 season, Rzeźniczak returned to Poland and signed a one-year contract with Wisła Płock.

On 19 June 2023, Rzeźniczak joined II liga club Kotwica Kołobrzeg. In the autumn round of the 2023–24 II liga season, he made 16 appearances, recorded one assist, and also served as the team's captain. On 30 December 2023, the club issued an announcement stating that Rzeźniczak was given a free hand to look for a new team. On 9 January 2024, Kotwica unilaterally terminated the player's deal, citing his breach of the contract and the Polish Football Association's Code of Ethics. In November 2024, Rzeźniczak won a court ruling against Kotwica for unjust termination, obligating the club to pay him arrears of wages with interest.

On 4 April 2025, Rzeźniczak announced his return to professional football, joining fifth-tier club Stal Kraśnik on a three-month deal with an extension option. He made 11 appearances as Stal won the IV liga Lublin title, earning promotion to the fourth tier. He left the club at the conclusion of the season.

In August 2025, Rzeźniczak joined regional league club Mazur Radzymin.

On 16 July 2026, Klasa A club Football Campus Tomaszów Mazowiecki announced the signing of Rzeźniczak.

== International career ==
Rzeźniczak was formerly a regular member of the Poland U21 team. He has earned nine caps for the senior national team.

== Career statistics ==
=== Club ===
As of match played 16 November 2025

Appearances and goals by club, season and competition
Club	Season	League			National cup (Note: Includes Polish Cup, Azerbaijan Cup)		Europe		Other		Total	
Club	Season	Division	Apps	Goals	Apps	Goals	Apps	Goals	Apps	Goals	Apps	Goals
Widzew Łódź	2003–04	Ekstraklasa	11	0	—		—		—		11	0
Legia Warsaw	2004–05	Ekstraklasa	18	0	9	0	1 (Note: Appearance in UEFA Cup)	0	—		28	0
Legia Warsaw	2005–06	Ekstraklasa	16	0	5	0	2	0	—		23	0
Legia Warsaw	2007–08	Ekstraklasa	21	0	5	0	—		3 (Note: Appearance in Ekstraklasa Cup)	0	29	0
Legia Warsaw	2008–09	Ekstraklasa	23	1	3	1	4	0	6 (Note: Five appearances in Ekstraklasa Cup, one appearance in Polish Super Cup)	0	36	2
Legia Warsaw	2009–10	Ekstraklasa	23	0	3	0	3 (Note: Appearances in UEFA Europa League)	0	—		29	0
Legia Warsaw	2010–11	Ekstraklasa	22	1	6	0	—		—		28	1
Legia Warsaw	2011–12	Ekstraklasa	15	0	6	0	7	0	—		28	0
Legia Warsaw	2012–13	Ekstraklasa	12	1	3	0	4	0	1 (Note: Appearance in Polish Super Cup)	0	20	1
Legia Warsaw	2013–14	Ekstraklasa	29	4	2	0	11 (Note: Five appearances and one goal in UEFA Champions League, six appearances in UEFA Europa League)	1	—		42	5
Legia Warsaw	2014–15	Ekstraklasa	31	5	6	0	13 (Note: Four appearances in UEFA Champions League, nine appearances in UEFA Europa League)	0	0	0	50	5
Legia Warsaw	2015–16	Ekstraklasa	20	0	5	0	10	1	1	0	36	1
Legia Warsaw	2016–17	Ekstraklasa	19	0	1	0	6 (Note: Appearances in UEFA Champions League)	0	1	0	27	0
Legia Warsaw	Total		249	12	54	1	61	2	12	0	376	15
Widzew Łódź (loan)	2006–07	Ekstraklasa	25	0	1	0	—		1	0	27	0
Legia Warsaw II	2014–15	III liga, group A	1	0	—		—		—		1	0
Legia Warsaw II	2015–16	III liga, group A	1	0	—		—		—		1	0
Legia Warsaw II	Total		2	0	—		—		—		2	0
Qarabağ	2017–18	Azerbaijan Premier League	14	0	2	0	11	0	—		27	0
Qarabağ	2018–19	Azerbaijan Premier League	11	1	1	0	9 (Note: Three appearances in UEFA Champions League, six appearances in UEFA Europa League)	0	—		21	1
Qarabağ	Total		25	1	3	0	20	0	—		48	1
Wisła Płock	2019–20	Ekstraklasa	16	2	0	0	—		—		16	2
Wisła Płock	2020–21	Ekstraklasa	21	1	1	0	—		—		22	1
Wisła Płock	2021–22	Ekstraklasa	28	0	1	0	—		—		29	0
Wisła Płock	2022–23	Ekstraklasa	25	0	0	0	—		—		25	0
Wisła Płock	Total		90	3	2	0	—		—		92	3
Kotwica Kołobrzeg	2023–24	II liga	16	0	1	0	—		—		17	0
Stal Kraśnik	2024–25	IV liga Lublin	11	0	—		—		—		11	0
Mazur Radzymin	2025–26	Regional league	10	0	—		—		—		10	0
Career total			439	16	60	1	72	2	13	0	584	19

=== International ===
Appearances and goals by national team and year
National team	Year	Apps	Goals
Poland
Poland	2008	1	0
Poland	2009	5	0
Poland	2011	1	0
Poland	2012	1	0
Poland	2014	1	0
Total		9	0

== Honours ==
Legia Warsaw

- Ekstraklasa: 2005–06, 2012–13, 2013–14, 2015–16, 2016–17
- Polish Cup: 2007–08, 2010–11, 2011–12, 2012–13, 2014–15, 2015–16
- Polish Super Cup: 2008

Qarabağ

- Azerbaijan Premier League: 2017–18, 2018–19

Stal Kraśnik

- IV liga Lublin: 2024–25
