= Bartłomiej Urbański =

Polish footballer

Personal information
- Date of birth: 15 May 1998 (age 28)
- Place of birth: Grójec, Poland
- Height: 1.75 m (5 ft 9 in)
- Position: Midfielder

Team information
- Current team: Ożarowianka Ożarów Mazowiecki
- Number: 8

Youth career
- 2010–2015: Polonia Warsaw

Senior career*
Years	Team	Apps	(Gls)
2015	Polonia Warsaw	7	(1)
2015–2017	Legia Warsaw II	56	(5)
2017–2018	Willem II	0	(0)
2019	Chojniczanka Chojnice	1	(0)
2020	Pogoń Siedlce	1	(0)
2020–2022	Pogoń Grodzisk	29	(3)
2022–2025	Weszło Warsaw	86	(4)
2025–	Ożarowianka Ożarów Mazowiecki	16	(1)

International career
2015	Poland U18	4	(0)
2016–2017	Poland U19	3	(0)
- * Club domestic league appearances and goals as of 11:02, 1 March 2026 (UTC)

Bartłomiej Urbański (born 15 May 1998) is a Polish professional footballer who plays as a midfielder for IV liga Masovia club Ożarowianka Ożarów Mazowiecki.

== Career ==
In 2017, Urbański signed for Dutch top flight side Willem II. Recalling his time in the Netherlands in 2020, he praised the level of and approach to youth development in the country, as well as willingness to let players focus on their best abilities in training. He also said, "the Dutch are very self-centered. [...] The entire nation considers itself outstanding. They are tactically and substantively prepared, but the players do not always want to listen to their coaches. [...] that can help, but also lead to worse roads. There is often a belief that you know everything best on the spot. There is no openness to other paths and ideas."

Before the second half of the 2018–19 season, he signed for Chojniczanka Chojnice in the Polish second division, where he made a single league appearance. On 24 April 2019, Urbański debuted for Chojniczanka Chojnice during a 0–2 loss to Warta Poznań. Before the second half of 2019–20 season, he joined Polish third division club Pogoń Siedlce. In 2020, he signed for Pogoń Grodzisk Mazowiecki in the Polish fourth division.

On 11 July 2022, Urbański joined V liga club Weszło Warsaw. He was released at the end of the 2024–25 season.

== Honours ==
Weszło Warsaw

- V liga Masovia I: 2022–23
- Polish Cup (Warsaw regionals): 2022–23, 2023–24
