= Arkadiusz Woźniak =

Polish footballer

Personal information
- Full name: Arkadiusz Woźniak
- Date of birth: 1 June 1990 (age 36)
- Place of birth: Lubin, Poland
- Height: 1.84 m (6 ft 1/2 in)
- Positions: Full-back; winger

Team information
- Current team: Zagłębie Lubin
- Number: 11

Youth career
- Zagłębie Lubin

Senior career*
Years	Team	Apps	(Gls)
2010–2018	Zagłębie Lubin	221	(35)
2014	→ Górnik Łęczna (loan)	15	(5)
2018–2022	GKS Katowice	122	(26)
2022–	Zagłębie Lubin	46	(0)
2022–	Zagłębie Lubin II	21	(3)

International career
2011	Poland U21	3	(1)
2011	Poland	1	(0)
- * Club domestic league appearances and goals as of 17:34, 29 May 2026 (UTC)

Arkadiusz Woźniak (born 1 June 1990) is a Polish professional footballer who plays for Ekstraklasa club Zagłębie Lubin.

== Career statistics ==
=== International ===
Appearances and goals by national team and year
National team	Year	Apps	Goals
Poland
Poland	2011	1	0
Total		1	0

== Honours ==
Zagłębie Lubin

- I liga: 2014–15

Zagłębie Lubin II

- IV liga Lower Silesia West: 2016–17
