= Maciej Urbańczyk =

Polish footballer (born 1995)

Personal information
- Full name: Maciej Urbańczyk
- Date of birth: 2 April 1995 (age 31)
- Place of birth: Mikołów, Poland
- Height: 1.72 m (5 ft 7 1/2 in)
- Position: Midfielder

Youth career
- –2013: Ruch Chorzów

Senior career*
Years	Team	Apps	(Gls)
2013–2019	Ruch Chorzów	99	(4)
2019–2022	Stal Mielec	73	(0)
2022–2024	Odra Opole	30	(1)
2024–2026	Hutnik Kraków	74	(3)

International career
2015	Poland U20	2	(0)
- * Club domestic league appearances and goals as of 19:04, 31 May 2026 (UTC)

Maciej Urbańczyk (born 2 April 1995) is a Polish professional footballer who plays as a midfielder.

== Career ==
=== Stal Mielec ===
Urbańczyk signed for Stal Mielec on 31 January 2019.

=== Odra Opole ===
On 30 June 2022, he moved to I liga side Odra Opole, signing a two-year deal with an extension option.

=== Hutnik Kraków ===
On 30 January 2024, Urbańczyk signed an eighteen-month contract with II liga outfit Hutnik Kraków.

== Honours ==
Stal Mielec

- I liga: 2019–20
