= Michał Kopczyński =

Polish footballer (born 1992)

Personal information
- Full name: Michał Kopczyński
- Date of birth: 15 June 1992 (age 34)
- Place of birth: Zamość, Poland
- Height: 1.80 m (5 ft 11 in)
- Positions: Defensive midfielder; centre-back

Team information
- Current team: Talent Warsaw

Youth career
- 2000–2012: Legia Warsaw

Senior career*
Years	Team	Apps	(Gls)
2012–2018	Legia Warsaw II	54	(5)
2012–2019	Legia Warsaw	53	(0)
2014–2015	→ Wigry Suwałki (loan)	26	(3)
2018–2019	→ Wellington Phoenix (loan)	23	(0)
2018	→ Wellington Phoenix II (loan)	2	(0)
2019–2020	Arka Gdynia	11	(0)
2020–2025	Warta Poznań	87	(3)
2025–2026	Mazovia Mińsk Mazowiecki	23	(2)
2026–	Talent Warsaw	0	(0)
- * Club domestic league appearances and goals as of 21:42, 22 June 2026 (UTC)

Michał Kopczyński (born 15 June 1992) is a Polish professional footballer who plays as a defensive midfielder or centre-back for IV liga Masovia club Talent Warsaw.

== Club career ==
On 20 August 2020, he signed a two-year contract with Warta Poznań. He left Warta at the conclusion of the 2024–25 season.

== Career statistics ==
As of match played 21 June 2026

Appearances and goals by club, season and competition
Club	Season	League			National cup (Note: Includes Polish Cup, Australia Cup)		Continental		Other		Total	
Club	Season	Division	Apps	Goals	Apps	Goals	Apps	Goals	Apps	Goals	Apps	Goals
Legia Warsaw II	2013–14	III liga, gr. A	21	0	—		—		—		21	1
Legia Warsaw II	2014–15	III liga, gr. A	2	1	—		—		—		2	1
Legia Warsaw II	2015–16	III liga, gr. A	26	3	—		—		—		26	3
Legia Warsaw II	2016–17	III liga, gr. I	2	0	—		—		—		2	0
Legia Warsaw II	2017–18	III liga, gr. I	3	0	—		—		—		3	0
Legia Warsaw II	Total		54	5	—		—		—		54	5
Legia Warsaw	2012–13	Ekstraklasa	1	0	2	1	0	0	0	0	3	1
Legia Warsaw	2013–14	Ekstraklasa	2	0	0	0	0	0	—		2	0
Legia Warsaw	2014–15	Ekstraklasa	0	0	0	0	0	0	0	0	0	0
Legia Warsaw	2015–16	Ekstraklasa	2	0	3	0	0	0	0	0	5	0
Legia Warsaw	2016–17	Ekstraklasa	31	0	0	0	11 (Note: Nine appearances in UEFA Champions League, two appearances in UEFA Europa League)	0	0	0	42	0
Legia Warsaw	2017–18	Ekstraklasa	17	0	4	0	3 (Note: Appearances in UEFA Champions League)	0	1 (Note: Appearance in Polish Super Cup)	0	25	0
Legia Warsaw	Total		53	0	9	1	14	0	1	0	77	1
Wigry Suwałki (loan)	2014–15	I liga	26	3	0	0	—		—		26	3
Wellington Phoenix FC (loan)	2018–19	A-League	23	0	1	0	—		—		24	0
Wellington Phoenix II (loan)	2018–19	NZFC	2	0	0	0	—		—		2	0
Arka Gdynia	2019–20	Ekstraklasa	11	0	0	0	—		—		11	0
Warta Poznań	2020–21	Ekstraklasa	7	0	0	0	—		—		7	0
Warta Poznań	2021–22	Ekstraklasa	26	2	0	0	—		—		26	2
Warta Poznań	2022–23	Ekstraklasa	28	1	0	0	—		—		28	1
Warta Poznań	2023–24	Ekstraklasa	7	0	0	0	—		—		7	0
Warta Poznań	2024–25	I liga	19	0	2	0	—		—		21	0
Warta Poznań	Total		87	3	2	0	—		—		89	3
Mazovia Mińsk Mazowiecki	2025–26	IV liga Masovia	21	2	—		—		2 (Note: Appearances in IV liga promotion play-offs)	0	23	2
Talent Warsaw	2026–27	IV liga Masovia	0	0	—		—		—		0	0
Career total			277	13	12	1	14	0	3	0	306	14

== Honours ==
Legia Warsaw

- Ekstraklasa: 2012–13, 2013–14, 2015–16, 2016–17, 2017–18
- Polish Cup: 2012–13, 2015–16, 2017–18

Mazovia Mińsk Mazowiecki

- Polish Cup (Siedlce regionals): 2025–26
