= Arkadiusz Malarz =

Polish footballer

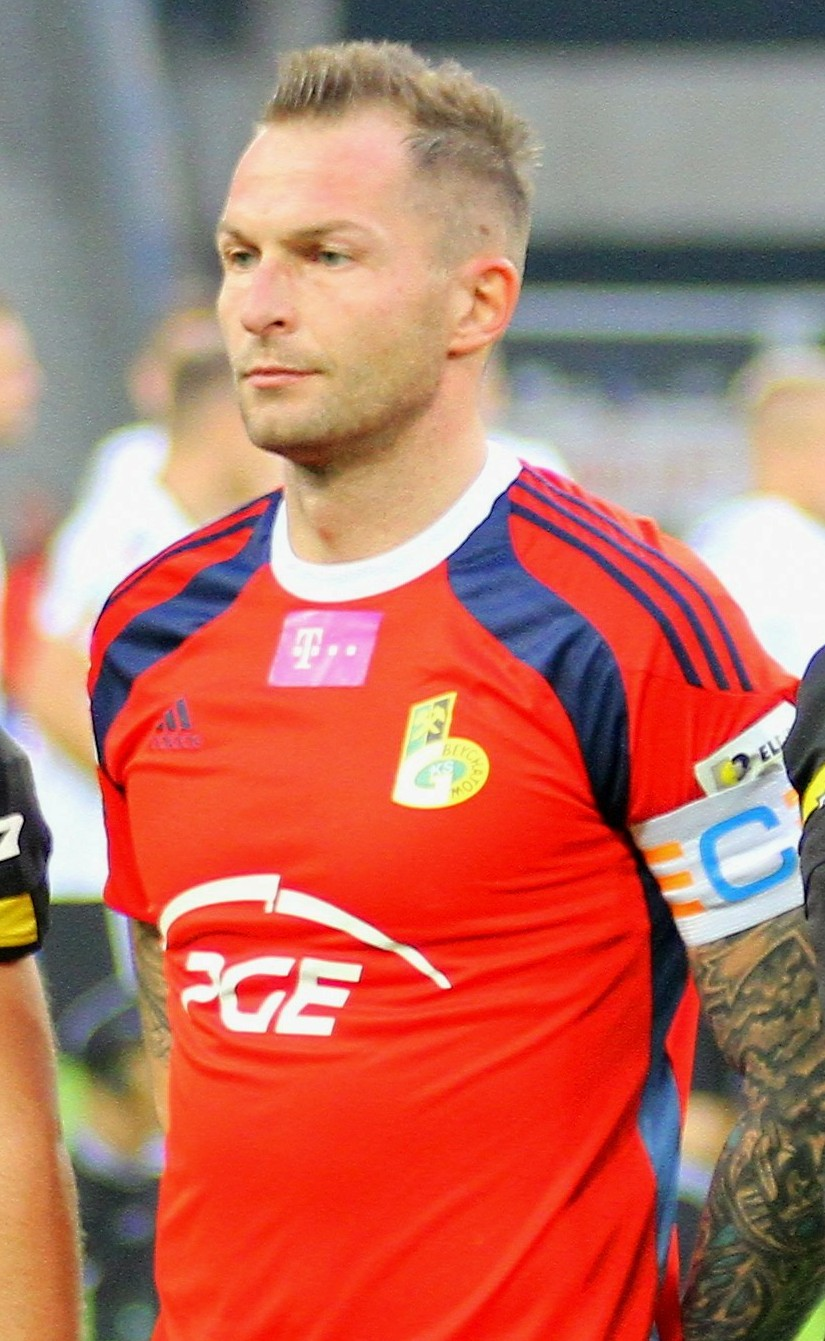
- Malarz with GKS Bełchatów in 2014

Personal information
- Full name: Arkadiusz Marcin Malarz
- Date of birth: 19 June 1980 (age 46)
- Place of birth: Pułtusk, Poland
- Height: 1.93 m (6 ft 4 in)
- Position: Goalkeeper

Youth career
- Nadnarwianka Pułtusk
- Mazovia Ciechanów
- 1997–1998: Bug Wyszków

Senior career*
| Years | Team | Apps | (Gls) |
| 1998–2000 | Polonia Warsaw | 0 | (0) |
| 2000–2001 | Gwardia Warsaw | | |
| 2001–2004 | Świt Nowy Dwór Mazowiecki | 20 | (0) |
| 2004–2006 | Amica Wronki | 10 | (0) |
| 2006 | Lech Poznań | 2 | (0) |
| 2006–2007 | Skoda Xanthi | 25 | (0) |
| 2007–2009 | Panathinaikos | 11 | (0) |
| 2008–2009 | → OFI (loan) | 27 | (0) |
| 2009–2010 | AEL | 15 | (0) |
| 2010–2011 | AEL Limassol | 9 | (0) |
| 2011–2012 | Panachaiki | 4 | (0) |
| 2012–2013 | Ethnikos Achna | 22 | (0) |
| 2013–2015 | GKS Bełchatów | 51 | (0) |
| 2015–2019 | Legia Warsaw | 104 | (0) |
| 2015–2019 | Legia Warsaw II | 4 | (0) |
| 2019–2021 | ŁKS Łódź | 56 | (0) |
- * Club domestic league appearances and goals

Arkadiusz Marcin Malarz (Polish pronunciation: [arˈkadjuʂ ˈmalaʂ]; born 19 June 1980) is a Polish former professional footballer who played as a goalkeeper.

While playing for Greek side Skoda Xanthi, he kept clean sheets in seven consecutive games, finally conceding a goal after 683 minutes, which is his former team's record for the longest "clean sheet" period in the Super League Greece.

From June 2022 to January 2026, he was the goalkeeping coach at Legia Warsaw.

== Honours ==
GKS Bełchatów

- I liga: 2013–14

Legia Warsaw

- Ekstraklasa: 2015–16, 2016–17, 2017–18
- Polish Cup: 2015–16

Individual

- Greek Best Goalkeeper: 2006–07
- Ekstraklasa Player of the Year: 2017
- Ekstraklasa Goalkeeper of the Season: 2017–18
