= Krzysztof Janus =

Polish footballer (born 1986)

Personal information
- Full name: Krzysztof Janus
- Date of birth: 25 March 1986 (age 40)
- Place of birth: Brzeg Dolny, Poland
- Height: 1.76 m (5 ft 9 in)
- Position: Winger

Team information
- Current team: Wisła Płock II (assistant); Wisła Płock U19 (manager)

Senior career*
Years	Team	Apps	(Gls)
2004	MKP Wołów		
2004–2007	Gawin Królewska Wola		
2007–2010	GKS Bełchatów	36	(1)
2010–2012	Cracovia	12	(0)
2011–2012	→ KS Polkowice (loan)	33	(5)
2012–2015	Wisła Płock	93	(28)
2015–2018	Zagłębie Lubin	63	(7)
2018	Arka Gdynia	3	(1)
2018–2022	Odra Opole	125	(18)
2022–2023	Wisła Płock II	28	(9)
2023–2024	Wisła Płock	18	(3)
2024–2026	Wisła Płock II	54	(10)

Managerial career
- 2025–2026: Wisła Płock U18
- 2026–: Wisła Płock U19
- * Club domestic league appearances and goals

Krzysztof Janus (born 25 March 1986) is a Polish professional football manager and former player who played as a winger. He currently serves as the assistant manager of Wisła Płock II, and is in charge of Wisła's under-19 team.

== Career ==
In July 2011, Janus was loaned to KS Polkowice on a one-year deal. After that, he played for Wisła Płock.

== Honours ==
Wisła Płock

- II liga East: 2012–13

Wisła Płock

- Polish Cup (Masovia regionals): 2022–23, 2025–26
