= Thibault Moulin =

French footballer (born 1990)

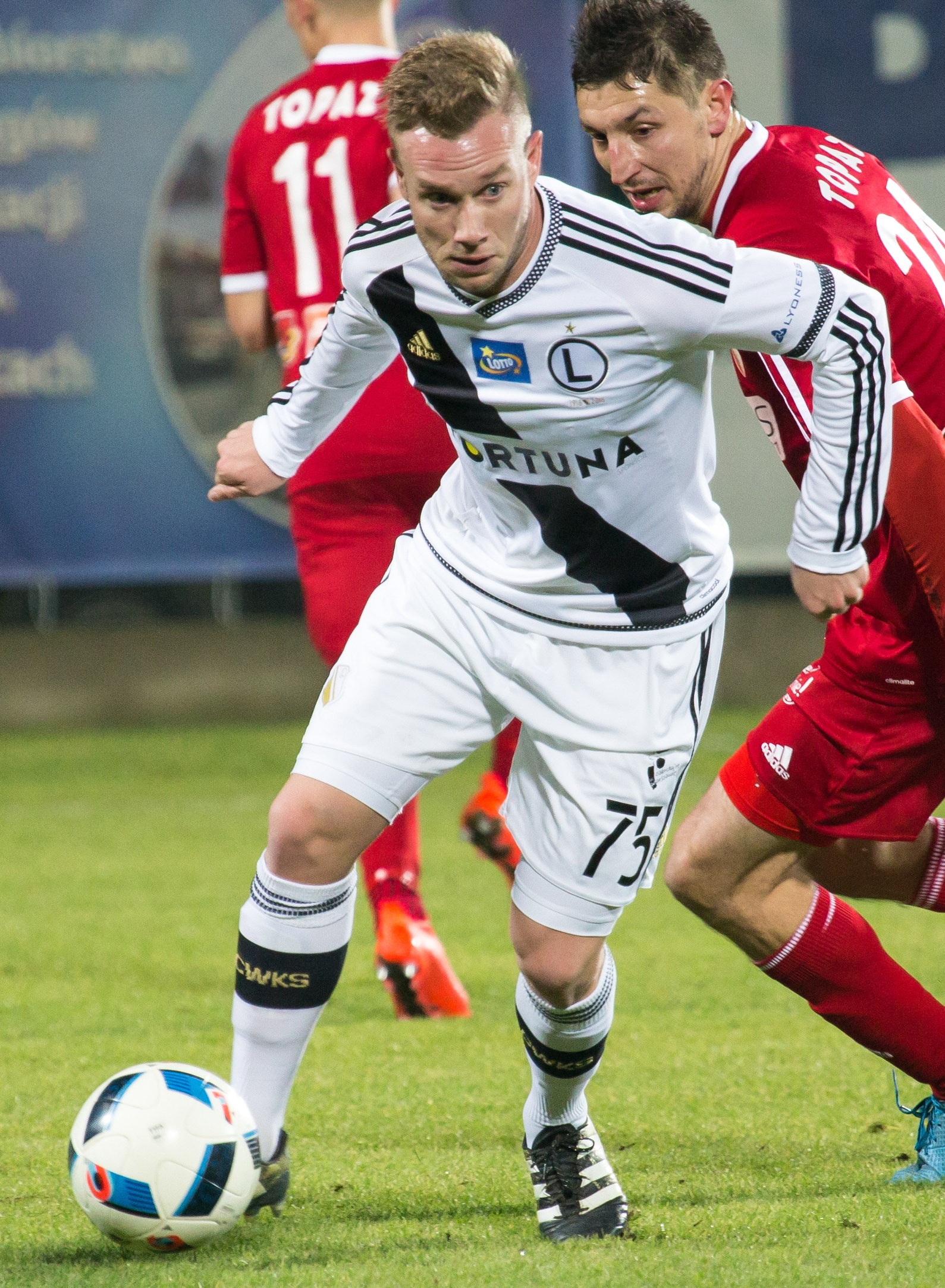
- Moulin playing for Legia Warsaw in November 2016

Personal information
- Full name: Thibault Gaëtan Mathieu Moulin
- Date of birth: 13 January 1990 (age 36)
- Place of birth: Flers, France
- Height: 1.74 m (5 ft 9 in)
- Position: Midfielder

Team information
- Current team: FC Flers

Youth career
- 1996–2000: Athis de l'Orne
- 2000–2004: FC Flers
- 2004–2010: Caen

Senior career*
Years	Team	Apps	(Gls)
2010–2013	Caen	36	(1)
2011–2012	→ Châteauroux (loan)	27	(4)
2013–2015	Clermont	67	(5)
2015–2016	Waasland-Beveren	31	(3)
2016–2018	Legia Warsaw	51	(4)
2017	Legia Warsaw II	1	(0)
2018–2020	PAOK	2	(0)
2018–2019	→ Ankaragücü (loan)	20	(0)
2019–2020	→ Xanthi (loan)	17	(0)
2020	MOS Caen	2	(0)
2021–2022	Academica Clinceni	32	(1)
2022–2024	Wieczysta Kraków	40	(4)
2024–	Football Club Flérien	0	(0)

International career
2011	France U21	2	(0)
- * Club domestic league appearances and goals as of 9 June 2024

Thibault Moulin (born 13 January 1990) is a French professional footballer who plays as a midfielder for Football Club Flérien.

== Career ==
Born in Flers, he primarily plays as an attacking midfielder and was promoted to the senior team of Caen for the 2010–11 season. Moulin made his professional debut on 11 September 2010 in a league match against Auxerre. On 1 February 2011, he signed his first professional contract after agreeing to a three-year deal with Caen.

On 28 June 2013, Moulin moved to the Ligue 2 side Clermont Foot on a two-year deal.

Following the expiration of his contract with Clermont Foot, Moulin joined Belgian club Waasland-Beveren in the summer transfer market of 2015. In Belgium in his first season played 33 games(4 goals and 10 assists). His superb appearances brought the interest of Polish club Legia Warsaw. In Poland, Moulin in his first season had 45 appearances (3 goals and 7 assists) having as a teammate PAOK winger Aleksandar Prijovic. His highlight with Legia Warsaw was a remarkable goal against giants Real Madrid, after Prijovic's assist in an UEFA Champions League. At the end of the season he won the Polish championship, being even decisive on the road to the title. In the first half of the 2017–18 season, he played in 26 games (3 goals, 1 assist).

=== PAOK ===
On 31 January 2018, just before the end of the transfer window, PAOK reached an agreement with Legia Warsaw for the transfer of Moulin. PAOK paid a transfer fee fee €1.3 million Moulin signing a three-year contract worth €600,000 per year.

On 17 August 2018, after making just official appearances in the domestic competitions during the second half of the 2017–18 season, Moulin joined MKE Ankaragücü on a season-long loan.

On 30 August 2019, Moulin joined Xanthi on a season-long loan.

== Career statistics ==
=== Club ===
As of 9 June 2024

Appearances and goals by club, season and competition
Club	Season	League			National cup (Note: Includes Coupe de France, Belgian Cup, Polish Cup, Greek Cup, Cupa României)		League cup (Note: Includes Coupe de la Ligue)		Continental		Other		Total	
Club	Season	Division	Apps	Goals	Apps	Goals	Apps	Goals	Apps	Goals	Apps	Goals	Apps	Goals
Caen	2010–11	Ligue 1	17	0	0	0	1	0	—		—		18	0
Caen	2012–13	Ligue 2	19	1	1	1	3	0	—		—		23	2
Caen	Total		36	1	1	1	4	0	—		—		41	2
Châteauroux (loan)	2011–12	Ligue 2	27	4	4	1	1	0	—		—		32	5
Clermont	2013–14	Ligue 2	32	3	0	0	2	0	—		—		34	3
Clermont	2014–15	Ligue 2	35	2	1	0	0	0	—		—		36	2
Clermont	Total		67	5	1	0	2	0	—		—		70	5
Waasland-Beveren	2015–16	Pro League	31	4	2	1	—		—		—		33	5
Legia Warsaw	2016–17	Ekstraklasa	32	2	1	0	—		12 (Note: Eleven appearances and one goal in UEFA Champions League, one appearance in UEFA Europa League)	1	0	0	45	3
Legia Warsaw	2017–18	Ekstraklasa	19	2	0	0	—		5 (Note: Three appearances in UEFA Champions League, two appearances in UEFA Europa League)	0	1 (Note: Appearance in Polish Super Cup)	1	25	3
Legia Warsaw	Total		51	4	1	0	—		17	1	1	1	70	6
Legia Warsaw II	2017–18	III liga, gr. I	1	0	—		—		—		—		1	0
PAOK	2017–18	Super League Greece	2	0	1	0	—		—		—		3	0
Ankaragücü (loan)	2018–19	Süper Lig	20	0	0	0	—		—		—		20	0
Xanthi (loan)	2019–20	Super League Greece	17	0	3	0	—		—		—		20	0
Academica Clinceni	2020–21	Liga I	17	1	0	0	—		—		—		17	1
Academica Clinceni	2021–22	Liga I	15	0	1	0	—		—		—		16	0
Academica Clinceni	Total		32	1	1	0	—		—		—		33	1
Wieczysta Kraków	2021–22	IV liga Les. Pol.	15	2	—		—		—		—		15	2
Wieczysta Kraków	2022–23	III liga, gr. IV	13	1	1	0	—		—		—		14	1
Wieczysta Kraków	2023–24	III liga, gr. IV	12	1	0	0	—		—		—		12	1
Wieczysta Kraków	Total		40	4	1	0	—		—		—		41	4
Career total			324	23	15	3	7	0	17	1	1	1	364	28

== Honours ==
Legia Warsaw

- Ekstraklasa: 2016–17, 2017–18
- Polish Cup: 2017–18

PAOK

- Greek Cup: 2017–18

Wieczysta Kraków

- III liga, group IV: 2023–24
- IV liga Lesser Poland West: 2021–22
- Polish Cup (Lesser Poland regionals): 2021–22
