= 2012–13 Polish Cup =

Puchar Polski

Tournament details
- Country: Poland
- Dates: 18 July 2012 – 8 May 2013
- Teams: 85

Final positions
- Champions: Legia Warsaw (16th title)
- Runners-up: Śląsk Wrocław

Tournament statistics
- Matches played: 86
- Goals scored: 274 (3.19 per match)
- Top goal scorer: Marek Saganowski (6)

The 2012–13 Polish Cup was the 59th season of the annual Polish football knockout tournament. It began on 18 July 2012 with the first matches of the extra preliminary round and ended on 3 May 2013 with the final. The winners qualified for the second qualifying round of the 2013–14 UEFA Europa League.

Legia Warsaw were the defending champions, having won their record breaking 15th title in the previous season. They successfully defended this title, becoming the winner of the Polish Cup for the 16th time in history.

== Participating teams ==
Enter in Round of 32	Enter in First Round	Enter in Extra preliminary round		
2011–12 Ekstraklasa; 16 teams	2011–12 I Liga; 18 teams	2011–12 II liga 35 teams		Winners of 16 regional cup competitions
Śląsk Wrocław; Ruch Chorzów; Legia Warsaw; Lech Poznań; Korona Kielce; Polonia Warsaw; Wisła Kraków; Górnik Zabrze; Zagłębie Lubin; Jagiellonia Białystok; Widzew Łódź; Podbeskidzie Bielsko-Biała; Lechia Gdańsk; GKS Bełchatów; KS Cracovia; ŁKS Łódź	Piast Gliwice; Pogoń Szczecin; Zawisza Bydgoszcz; Kolejarz Stróże; Termalica Bruk-Bet Nieciecza; GKS Bogdanka; Arka Gdynia; Flota Świnoujście; Ruch Radzionków; Warta Poznań; Olimpia Grudziądz; Sandecja Nowy Sącz; GKS Katowice; Dolcan Ząbki; Polonia Bytom; Wisła Płock; KS Polkowice; Olimpia Elbląg	Okocimski KS Brzesko; Stomil Olsztyn; Puszcza Niepołomice; Znicz Pruszków; Motor Lublin; Resovia; Stal Stalowa Wola; Wisła Puławy; Pogoń Siedlce; Świt Nowy Dwór Mazowiecki; Stal Rzeszów; Wigry Suwałki; Garbarnia Kraków; Pelikan Łowicz; Jeziorak Iława; KSZO Ostrowiec Świętokrzyski; Sokół Sokółka	Miedź Legnica; GKS Tychy; Bytovia Bytów; Jarota Jarocin; Ruch Zdzieszowice; Górnik Wałbrzych; Elana Toruń; Chrobry Głogów; Chojniczanka Chojnice; MKS Kluczbork; Raków Częstochowa; Czarni Żagań; Energetyk ROW Rybnik; Zagłębie Sosnowiec; Tur Turek; Calisia Kalisz; Nielba Wągrowiec; Bałtyk Gdynia	LZS Stary Śleszów (Lower Silesia); Cuiavia Inowrocław (Kujawy-Pomerania); GKS II Bogdanka (Lublin); Lechia Zielona Góra (Lubusz); Sokół Aleksandrów Łódzki (Łódź); Limanovia Limanowa (Lesser Poland); Legia Warsaw youth (Mazovia); Odra Wodzisław Śląski^{1} (Opole); Piast Tuczempy (Podkarpacie); ŁKS 1926 Łomża (Podlasie); Kaszubia Kościerzyna (Pomerania); Polonia Łaziska Górne (Silesia); Łysica II Bodzentyn (Świętokrzyskie); Sokół Ostróda (Warmia-Masuria); Luboński KS (Greater Poland); Kotwica Kołobrzeg (West Pomerania)

Notes:

1. The winner of Opole region preliminaries Start Bogdanowice changed its name to Odra Wodzisław. The two clubs merged in January 2012.

== Round and draw dates ==
Round	Draw date	First leg	Second leg
Extra preliminary round	18 June 2012	18 July 2012	—
Preliminary round	18 June 2012	24–25 July 2012	—
First round	26 July 2012	31 July–1 August 2012	—
Round of 32	26 July 2012	4, 5, 11 & 12 August 2012	—
Round of 16	21 August 2012	25–27 September, 2 & 3 October 2012	—
Quarter-finals	24 October 2012	26–28 February 2013	12, 13, 26, 27 March 2013
Semi-finals	14 March 2013	9, 10 April 2013	16, 17 April 2013
Final	—	2 May 2013	8 May 2013

== Extra preliminary round ==
The draw for this round was conducted at the headquarters of the Polish FA on 18 June 2012. Participating in this round were 16 regional cup winners and 35 teams from the 2011–12 II liga. The matches were played on 18 July 2012. Pelikan Łowicz received a bye to the preliminary round.

Team 1	Score	Team 2
18 July 2012
Kaszubia Kościerzyna	1–3 (a.e.t.)	Stomil Olsztyn
Kotwica Kołobrzeg	2–0	Elana Toruń
Sokół Ostróda	2–1	Jeziorak Iława
ŁKS 1926 Łomża	0–3	Świt Nowy Dwór Mazowiecki
Cuiavia Inowrocław	1–2	Nielba Wągrowiec
Luboński KS	w/o^{1}	Calisia Kalisz
Lechia Zielona Góra	1–2	Chrobry Głogów
Sokół Aleksandrów Łódzki	1–0	Znicz Pruszków
Legia Warsaw youth	2–1	Motor Lublin
GKS II Bogdanka	w/o^{2}	KSZO Ostrowiec Świętokrzyski
Łysica II Bodzentyn	w/o^{3}	Stal Stalowa Wola
LZS Stary Śleszów	0–3	Górnik Wałbrzych
Odra Wodzisław	1–3	GKS Tychy
Polonia Łaziska Górne	2–4	Puszcza Niepołomice
Limanovia Limanowa	2–0	Raków Częstochowa
Piast Tuczempy	1–1 (a.e.t.) (1–4 p)	Garbarnia Kraków
Bałtyk Gdynia	2–0	Bytovia Bytów
Miedź Legnica	w/o^{4}	Czarni Żagań
Sokół Sokółka	0–6	Wigry Suwałki
Chojniczanka Chojnice	2–2 (a.e.t.) (5–4 p)	Jarota Jarocin
Tur Turek	0–0 (a.e.t.) (4–3 p)	MKS Kluczbork
Ruch Zdzieszowice	2–0	Energetyk ROW Rybnik
Wisła Puławy	1–3	Pogoń Siedlce
Resovia	2–3 (a.e.t.)	Okocimski KS Brzesko
Zagłębie Sosnowiec	2–1	Stal Rzeszów

Notes:

1. Calisia withdrew from the competition.
2. KSZO Ostrowiec Świętokrzyski withdrew from the competition.
3. Stal Stalowa Wola withdrew from the competition.
4. Czarni Żagań withdrew from the competition.

== Preliminary round ==
The draw for this round was conducted at the headquarters of the Polish FA on 18 June 2012. The matches were played on 24 and 25 July 2012. Stomil Olsztyn and Sokół Aleksandrów Łódzki received a bye to the first round.

Team 1	Score	Team 2
24 July 2012
Legia Warsaw youth	2–1	GKS II Bogdanka
25 July 2012
Kotwica Kołobrzeg	0–0 (a.e.t.) (5–4 p)	Bałtyk Gdynia
Sokół Ostróda	1–0	Świt Nowy Dwór Mazowiecki
Luboński KS	3–1	Nielba Wągrowiec
Chrobry Głogów	1–2	Miedź Legnica
Łysica II Bodzentyn	5–1	Pogoń Siedlce
Górnik Wałbrzych	2–0	GKS Tychy
Limanovia Limanowa	2–1	Garbarnia Kraków
Ruch Zdzieszowice	2–1	Tur Turek
Wigry Suwałki	2–2 (a.e.t.) (6–5 p)	Chojniczanka Chojnice
Puszcza Niepołomice	2–2 (a.e.t.) (4–5 p)	Okocimski KS Brzesko
Pelikan Łowicz	3–2	Zagłębie Sosnowiec

== First round ==
The draw for this round was conducted at the headquarters of the Polish FA on 26 July 2012. Participating in this round are the 12 winners of the preliminary round along with Stomil Olsztyn and Sokół Aleksandrów Łódzki and the 18 teams from 2011–12 I Liga (Poland). The matches will be played on 31 July–1 August 2012.

Team 1	Score	Team 2
31 July 2012
Pelikan Łowicz	2–1	Kolejarz Stróże
Okocimski KS Brzesko	1–1 (a.e.t.) (4–2 p)	Polonia Bytom
Stomil Olsztyn	2–3	GKS Bogdanka
Arka Gdynia	0–1	Olimpia Elbląg
1 August 2012
Limanovia Limanowa	0–1	Piast Gliwice
Wigry Suwałki	1–2	Termalica Bruk-Bet Nieciecza
Luboński KS	4–2	GKS Katowice
Sokół Ostróda	w/o^{1}	Ruch Radzionków
Miedź Legnica	2–1	Dolcan Ząbki
Łysica II Bodzentyn	1–2	Wisła Płock
Kotwica Kołobrzeg	0–4	Warta Poznań
Ruch Zdzieszowice	0–5	Flota Świnoujście
Górnik Wałbrzych	4–1	Sandecja Nowy Sącz
Sokół Aleksandrów Łódzki	0–5	Zawisza Bydgoszcz
Legia Warsaw youth	2–4 (a.e.t.)	KS Polkowice
Olimpia Grudziądz	1–0 (a.e.t.)	Pogoń Szczecin

Notes:

1. Ruch Radzionków withdrew from the competition.

== Round of 32 ==
The draw for this round was conducted at the headquarters of the Polish FA on 26 July 2012. Participating in this round are the 16 winners of the first round along with and the 16 teams from 2011–12 Ekstraklasa. The matches will be played on 11–12 August 2012 with the exception of matches involving Legia Warsaw and Śląsk Wrocław.

Team 1	Score	Team 2
4 August 2012
KS Polkowice	0–1	Śląsk Wrocław
5 August 2012
Okocimski KS Brzesko	0–4	Legia Warsaw
11 August 2012
Luboński KS	0–5	Wisła Kraków
Wisła Płock	2–4	Zagłębie Lubin
GKS Bogdanka	1–2 (a.e.t.)	Lechia Gdańsk
Olimpia Elbląg	1–2 (a.e.t.)	Korona Kielce
Termalica Bruk-Bet Nieciecza	0–2	GKS Bełchatów
Górnik Wałbrzych	2–1	ŁKS Łódź
Flota Świnoujście	2–1	Górnik Zabrze
Warta Poznań	1–0	Podbeskidzie Bielsko-Biała
Piast Gliwice	1–0	Widzew Łódź
Sokół Ostróda	1–8	Jagiellonia Białystok
Zawisza Bydgoszcz	0–2	Cracovia
12 August 2012
Pelikan Łowicz	0–1	Ruch Chorzów
Miedź Legnica	1–3	Polonia Warsaw
Olimpia Grudziądz	2–1 (a.e.t.)	Lech Poznań

4 August 2012	KS Polkowice	0–1	Śląsk Wrocław	Polkowice
19:00 CEST (UTC+02:00)			Díaz 31'	Stadium: Stadion KS-u; Attendance: 600; Referee: Jarosław Rynkiewicz (Szczecin)

5 August 2012	Okocimski KS Brzesko	0–4	Legia Warsaw	Brzesko
17:00 CEST (UTC+02:00)			Kopczyński 43'; Żyro 54', 87'; Saganowski 58'	Stadium: Stadion Okocimskiego KS; Attendance: 1,000; Referee: Paweł Pskit (Łódź)

11 August 2012	Luboński KS	0–5	Wisła Kraków	Poznań
14:00 CEST (UTC+02:00)			Genkov 60', 66', 88'; Garguła 85'; Boguski 90+1'	Stadium: Stadion Miejski w Luboniu; Referee: Wojciech Ksztoń (Olsztyn)

11 August 2012	Wisła Płock	2–4	Zagłębie Lubin	Płock
14:30 CEST (UTC+02:00)	Dziedzic 48' (pen.); Sielewski 56'		Pawłowski 29' (pen.); Woźniak 37'; Jež 54'; Šernas 82'	Stadium: Stadion im. Kazimierza Górskiego; Attendance: 1,000; Referee: Erwin Paterek (Lublin)

11 August 2012	GKS Bogdanka	1–2 (a.e.t.)	Lechia Gdańsk	Łęczna
16:00 CEST (UTC+02:00)	Ropiejko 29'		Madera 55'; Wiśniewski 98'	Stadium: Stadion Górnika; Referee: Mariusz Korzeb (Warsaw)

11 August 2012	Olimpia Elbląg	1–2 (a.e.t.)	Korona Kielce	Elbląg
16:00 CEST (UTC+02:00)	Lubenov 90' (pen.)		Zieliński 45'; Kijanskas 120'	Stadium: Stadion Miejski; Referee: Artur Ciecierski (Warsaw)

11 August 2012	Termalica Bruk-Bet Nieciecza	0–2	GKS Bełchatów	Nieciecza
17:00 CEST (UTC+02:00)			Wróbel 77'; Buzała 78'	Stadium: Stadion LKS-u; Attendance: 1,000; Referee: Rafał Greń (Rzeszów)

11 August 2012	Górnik Wałbrzych	2–1	ŁKS Łódź	Wałbrzych
17:00 CEST (UTC+02:00)	Zinke 40'; D. Michalak 58'		Stąporski 6'	Stadium: Stadion 1000-lecia Referee: Dawid Bukowczan (Żywiec)

11 August 2012	Flota Świnoujście	2–1	Górnik Zabrze	Świnoujście
17:00 CEST (UTC+02:00)	Śpiączka 33'; Zalepa 74'		Milik 90+2' (pen.)	Stadium: Stadion OSiR Wyspiarz; Referee: Szymon Lizak (Poznań)

11 August 2012	Warta Poznań	1–0	Podbeskidzie Bielsko-Biała	Poznań
17:30 CEST (UTC+02:00)	Bartczak 22' (pen.)			Stadium: Stadion Warty; Attendance: 500; Referee: Sebastian Tarnowski (Wrocław)

11 August 2012	Piast Gliwice	1–0	Widzew Łódź	Gliwice
18:30 CEST (UTC+02:00)	R. Jurado 50'			Stadium: Stadion Miejski; Attendance: 523; Referee: Tomasz Kwiatkowski (Warsaw)

11 August 2012	Sokół Ostróda	1–8	Jagiellonia Białystok	Ostróda
20:00 CEST (UTC+02:00)	M. Śnieżawski 90+2' (pen.)		Gajos 5'; Makuszewski 26', 45+2'; Frankowski 57'; Kupisz 65', 86' (pen.); Dzalamidze 76'; Dźwigała 79'	Stadium: Stadion Miejski; Attendance: 1,500; Referee: Michał Mularczyk (Skierniewice)

11 August 2012	Zawisza Bydgoszcz	0–2	KS Cracovia	Bydgoszcz
20:15 CEST (UTC+02:00)			Dudzic 17'; Štraus 89'	Stadium: Kompleks Sportowy Zawisza; Referee: Marcin Szrek (Kielce)

12 August 2012	Pelikan Łowicz	0–1	Ruch Chorzów	Łowicz
11:15 CEST (UTC+02:00)			Kuświk 76'	Stadium: Stadion Miejski; Attendance: 2,000; Referee: Łukasz Szczech (Białystok)

12 August 2012	Miedź Legnica	1–3	Polonia Warsaw	Legnica
14:30 CEST (UTC+02:00)	Zakrzewski 89'		Wszołek 25', 70'; Gołębiewski 35'	Stadium: Stadion Miejski; Attendance: 3,500; Referee: Grzegorz Jabłoński (Kraków)

12 August 2012	Olimpia Grudziądz	2–1 (a.e.t.)	Lech Poznań	Grudziądz
17:00 CEST (UTC+02:00)	Cieśliński 15'; Woźniak 96'		Trałka 82'	Stadium: Stadion Centralny; Referee: Łukasz Bednarek (Koszalin)

== Round of 16 ==
The 16 winners from Round of 32 compete in this round. The matches will be played on 25–27 September and 2–3 October.

Team 1	Score	Team 2
25 September 2012
Warta Poznań	0−1	Wisła Kraków
Ruch Chorzów	3–1 (a.e.t.)	Korona Kielce
26 September 2012
Piast Gliwice	1−2	Legia Warsaw
Śląsk Wrocław	3−0	GKS Bełchatów
27 September 2012
Górnik Wałbrzych	1−3 (a.e.t.)	Olimpia Grudziądz
2 October 2012
Zagłębie Lubin	2−1	Polonia Warsaw
3 October 2012
Flota Świnoujście	2–2 (a.e.t.) (8–7 p)	Cracovia
Jagiellonia Białystok	2–2 (a.e.t.) (5–4 p)	Lechia Gdańsk

25 September 2012	Warta Poznań	0–1	Wisła Kraków	Poznań
15:30 CEST (UTC+02:00)			Genkov 56'	Stadium: Stadion Warty; Attendance: 2,500; Referee: Tomasz Wajda (Żywiec)

25 September 2012	Ruch Chorzów	3–1 (a.e.t.)	Korona Kielce	Chorzów
18:30 CEST (UTC+02:00)	Piech 80'; Smektała 94'; Šultes 119'		Janota 71'	Stadium: Stadion Miejski; Attendance: 3,100; Referee: Krzysztof Jakubik (Siedlce)

26 September 2012	Piast Gliwice	1–2	Legia Warsaw	Gliwice
18:30 CEST (UTC+02:00)	Cuerda 73'		Kucharczyk 43'; Salinas 60'	Stadium: Stadion Miejski; Attendance: 5,000; Referee: Paweł Pskit (Łódź)

26 September 2012	Śląsk Wrocław	3–0	GKS Bełchatów	Wrocław
20:30 CEST (UTC+02:00)	Gikiewicz 25', 42'; Cetnarski 87' (pen.)			Stadium: Stadion Miejski; Attendance: 19,438; Referee: Sebastian Jarzębak (Bytom)

27 September 2012	Górnik Wałbrzych	1–3 (a.e.t.)	Olimpia Grudziądz	Wałbrzych
15:00 CEST (UTC+02:00)	Zinke 78'		Mazurkiewicz 59'; Cieśliński 95'; Franczak 114'	Stadium: Stadion 1000-lecia Attendance: 1,500; Referee: Rafał Rokosz (Katowice)

2 October 2012	Zagłębie Lubin	2–1	Polonia Warsaw	Płock
18:30 CEST (UTC+02:00)	Papadopulos 41'; Tunchev 53'		Wszołek 45+2'	Stadium: Stadion im. Kazimierza Górskiego; Attendance: 3,852; Referee: Tomasz Radkiewicz (Łódź)

3 October 2012	Flota Świnoujście	2–2 (a.e.t.) (8–7 p)	KS Cracovia	Świnoujście
15:30 CEST (UTC+02:00)	Niewiada 2', 69'		Szeliga 17'; Kosanović 55'	Stadium: Stadion OSiR Wyspiarz; Attendance: 2,000; Referee: Bartosz Frankowski (Toruń)
	Penalties
	Kieruzel (penalty scored); Olszar (penalty missed); Bodziony (penalty scored); Zelepa (penalty scored); Kasprzik (penalty scored); Jasiński (penalty scored); Śpiączka (penalty scored); Fryc (penalty scored); Udarević (penalty scored)		(penalty scored) Żytko; (penalty scored) Boljević; (penalty missed) Danielewicz; (penalty scored) Bernhardt; (penalty scored) Kosanović; (penalty scored) Dudzic; (penalty scored) Dąbrowski; (penalty scored) Zejdler; (penalty missed) Štraus

3 October 2012	Jagiellonia Białystok	2–2 (a.e.t.) (5–4 p)	Lechia Gdańsk	Białystok
18:30 CEST (UTC+02:00)	Smolarek 20'; Kupisz 32'		Kupisz 30' (o.g.); Traoré 75'	Stadium: Stadion Miejski; Attendance: 2,437; Referee: Tomasz Kwiatkowski (Warsaw)
	Penalties
	Kupisz (penalty scored); Grzyb (penalty scored); Dzalamidze (penalty missed); Norambuena (penalty scored); Pejović (penalty scored); Tymiński (penalty scored)		(penalty scored) Andreu; (penalty scored) Deleu; (penalty scored) Machaj; (penalty scored) Rasiak; (penalty missed) Traoré; (penalty missed) Surma

== Quarter-finals ==
The 8 winners from Round of 16 competed in this round.
The matches will be played in two legs. The first leg took place on 26 and 28 February 2013, while the second legs were played on 12 and 13 March 2013.
Pairs were determined on 24 October 2012.

Two second legs were moved to 26–27 March 2013 due to bad weather conditions. This is an official UEFA date and matches will be played without players called to the National Teams, what was agreed by interested teams.

Team 1	Agg.	Team 2	1st leg	2nd leg
Legia Warsaw	6–2	Olimpia Grudziądz	4–1	2–1
Wisła Kraków	6–2	Jagiellonia Białystok	2–0	4–2
Śląsk Wrocław	5–2	Flota Świnoujście	3–2	2–0
Zagłębie Lubin	2–3	Ruch Chorzów	2–2	0–1

=== First leg ===
26 February 2013	Legia Warsaw	4–1	Olimpia Grudziądz	Warsaw
18:15 CET (UTC+01:00)	Saganowski 53', 90'; Jędrzejczyk 63'; Dvalishvili 90+1'		Ruszkul 35'	Stadium: Pepsi Arena; Attendance: 11,696; Referee: Marcin Szrek (Kielce)

27 February 2013	Śląsk Wrocław	3–2	Flota Świnoujście	Wrocław
17:00 CET (UTC+01:00)	Ostrowski 23'; Sobota 56'; Ćwielong 90'		Niedziela 6' (pen.); Bodziony 26'	Stadium: Stadion Miejski; Attendance: 12,467; Referee: Robert Małek (Zabrze)

27 February 2013	Zagłębie Lubin	2–2	Ruch Chorzów	Lubin
18:30 CET (UTC+01:00)	Pawłowski 42'; Wilczek 59'		Jankowski 13'; Tymiński 70'	Stadium: Stadion Zagłębia; Attendance: 5,134; Referee: Bartosz Frankowski (Toruń)

28 February 2013	Wisła Kraków	2–0	Jagiellonia Białystok	Kraków
20:00 CET (UTC+01:00)	Boguski 39', 45'		Kupisz (penalty missed) 51'	Stadium: Stadion Miejski; Attendance: 9,833; Referee: Jarosław Rynkiewicz (Zielona Góra)

=== Second leg ===
12 March 2013	Jagiellonia Białystok	2–4 (2–6 agg.)	Wisła Kraków	Białystok
18:00 CET (UTC+01:00)	Dani Quintana 56', 70'		Burliga 21'; Boguski 34'; Sobolewski 48'; Małecki 89'	Stadium: Stadion Miejski; Attendance: 1,000; Referee: Szymon Marciniak (Płock)

13 March 2013	Ruch Chorzów	1–0 (3–2 agg.)	Zagłębie Lubin	Chorzów
18:30 CET (UTC+01:00)	Janoszka 57'			Stadium: Stadion Miejski; Attendance: 4,150; Referee: Tomasz Kwiatkowski (Warsaw)

26 March 2013	Olimpia Grudziądz	1–2 (2–6 agg.)	Legia Warsaw	Grudziądz
14:30 CET (UTC+01:00)	Banasiak 89'		Dvalishvili 73'; Saganowski 77'	Stadium: Stadion Centralny; Attendance: 3,000; Referee: Tomasz Radkiewicz (Łódź)

27 March 2013	Flota Świnoujście	0–2 (2–5 agg.)	Śląsk Wrocław	Świnoujście
14:00 CET (UTC+01:00)			Gikiewicz 6'; Sobota 35'	Stadium: Stadion OSiR Wyspiarz; Attendance: 1,500; Referee: Tomasz Garbowski (Kluczbork)

== Semi-finals ==
The 4 winners from the Quarterfinals will compete in this round.
The matches will be played in two legs. The first legs took place on 10 April 2013, while the second legs were played on 17 April 2013.
The two winners moved on to the final.

Team 1	Agg.	Team 2	1st leg	2nd leg
Śląsk Wrocław	5−3	Wisła Kraków	2−1	3−2
Ruch Chorzów	1–2	Legia Warsaw	0–0	1–2

=== First leg ===
9 April 2013	Ruch Chorzów	0–0	Legia Warsaw	Chorzów
18:30 CEST (UTC+02:00)				Stadium: Stadion Miejski; Attendance: 3,300; Referee: Bartosz Frankowski (Toruń)

10 April 2013	Śląsk Wrocław	2–1	Wisła Kraków	Wrocław
18:30 CEST (UTC+02:00)	Sobota 10'; Mila 13'		Małecki 51'	Stadium: Stadion Miejski; Attendance: 20,981; Referee: Paweł Pskit (Łódź)

=== Second leg ===
16 April 2013	Legia Warsaw	2–1 (2–1 agg.)	Ruch Chorzów	Warsaw
18:30 CEST (UTC+02:00)	Radović (penalty missed) 35'; Dvalishvili 52', 60' (pen.)		Starzyński 54' (pen.)	Stadium: Pepsi Arena; Attendance: 12,048; Referee: Tomasz Musiał (Kraków)

17 April 2013	Wisła Kraków	2–3 (3–5 agg.)	Śląsk Wrocław	Kraków
18:30 CEST (UTC+02:00)	Wilk 27'; Iliev 68'		Stevanovič 23'; Sobota 54'; Mila 80'	Stadium: Stadion Miejski; Attendance: 11,189; Referee: Paweł Raczkowski (Warsaw)

== Final ==
=== First leg ===
2 May 2013
18:30 CEST (UTC+02:00)

Śląsk Wrocław	0–2	Legia Warsaw
		Saganowski 32', 44'

Stadion Miejski, Wrocław
Attendance: 35,000
Referee: Szymon Marciniak (Płock)

=== Second leg ===
8 May 2013
20:30 CEST (UTC+02:00)

Legia Warsaw	0–1	Śląsk Wrocław
		Żewłakow 2' (o.g.)

Pepsi Arena, Warsaw
Attendance: 29,416
Referee: Paweł Gil (Lublin)

Legia Warsaw won 2–1 on aggregate.

== Goalscores ==
6 goals

- Marek Saganowski (Legia Warsaw)

4 goals

- Rafał Boguski (Wisła Kraków)
- Vladimir Dvalishvili (Legia Warsaw)
- Tsvetan Genkov (Wisła Kraków)
- Rafał Leśniewski (Zawisza Bydgoszcz)
- Waldemar Sobota (Śląsk Wrocław)

3 goals

- Adam Cieśliński (Olimpia Grudziądz)
- Łukasz Gikiewicz (Śląsk Wrocław)
- Mirosław Kalista (Łysica II Bodzentyn)
- Tomasz Kupisz (Jagiellonia Białystok)
- Dariusz Michalak (Górnik Wałbrzych)
- Adrian Moszyk (Górnik Wałbrzych)
- Marek Śnieżawski (Sokół Ostróda)
- Paweł Wszołek (Polonia Warszawa)
- Łukasz Zaniewski (Okocimski Brzesko)
- Daniel Zinke (Górnik Wałbrzych)

2 goals

- 26 players

1 goal

- 161 players

== See also ==
- 2012–13 Ekstraklasa
