= 2011–12 I liga =

I liga
- Season: 2011–12
- Champions: Piast Gliwice
- Promoted: Piast Gliwice; Pogoń Szczecin
- Relegated: Wisła Płock; Polonia Bytom; KS Polkowice; Olimpia Elbląg
- Matches: 306
- Goals: 786 (2.57 per match)
- Top goalscorer: Wojciech Kędziora (18 goals)
- Biggest home win: Katowice 5–0 Polkowice; Wisła 6–1 Sandecja
- Biggest away win: Flota 0–4 Sandecja
- Highest scoring: Ruch 4–4 Polkowice
- Longest winning run: 5 games Pogoń Szczecin
- Longest unbeaten run: 12 games Zawisza Bydgoszcz
- Longest winless run: 15 games Flota Świnoujście
- Longest losing run: 5 games Sandecja Nowy Sącz; Olimpia Elbląg
- Highest attendance: 9,432; Piast 2–1 Wisła (5 November 2011)
- Total attendance: 688,410
- Average attendance: 2,248 ▲9.1%

The 2011–12 I liga was the 64th season of the second tier domestic division in the Polish football league system since its establishment in 1949 and the 4th season of the Polish I liga under its current title. The league was operated by the Polish Football Association (PZPN).

The league is contested by 18 teams who competing for promotion to the 2012–13 Ekstraklasa. The regular season was played in a round-robin tournament. The champions and runners-up would receive promotion. The bottom four teams were automatically demoted to the II liga.

== Changes from last season ==
=== From I liga ===
Promoted to 2010–11 Ekstraklasa

- ŁKS Łódź
- Podbeskidzie Bielsko-Biała

Relegated

- MKS Kluczbork (to II liga, Group West)
- KSZO Ostrowiec Świętokrzyski (to II liga, Group East)
- Odra Wodzisław Śląski (disbanded)
- GKP Gorzów Wielkopolski (disbanded)

=== To I liga ===
Relegated from 2010–11 Ekstraklasa

- Arka Gdynia
- Polonia Bytom

Promoted from II liga, Group East

- Olimpia Elbląg
- Wisła Płock

Promoted from II liga, Group West

- Olimpia Grudziądz
- Zawisza Bydgoszcz

== Team overview ==
=== Stadiums and locations ===
Location of teams and stadiums in 2011–12 I liga
Location of teams in the Metropolis GZM

Team	Stadium	Capacity
Arka Gdynia	Stadion Miejski	15,139
GKS Bogdanka	Stadion Górnika	7,200
Dolcan Ząbki	Stadion Dolcanu	2,100
Flota Świnoujście	Stadion Miejski	4,500
GKS Katowice	Stadion GKS Katowice	9,511
Kolejarz Stróże	Stadion Kolejarza	2,000
KS Polkowice	Stadion Miejski	4,365
Olimpia Elbląg	Stadion Miejski	7,000
Olimpia Grudziądz	Stadion Centralny	5,250
Piast Gliwice	Arena Gliwice^{1}	10,037
Pogoń Szczecin	Stadion im. Floriana Krygiera	18,027
Polonia Bytom	Stadion im. Edwarda Szymkowiaka	6,000
Ruch Radzionków	Stadion Ruchu (in Bytom)	3,000
Sandecja Nowy Sącz	Stadion im. Ojca Władysława Augustynka	5,000
Termalica Bruk-Bet Nieciecza	Stadion Nieciecza	2,093
Warta Poznań	Stadion Lecha^{2}	41,609
Wisła Płock	Stadion im. Kazimierza Górskiego	12,800
Zawisza Bydgoszcz	Stadion Miejski im. Zdzisława Krzyszkowiaka	20,247

1. Piast played 2 home games at Stadion Miejski in Wodzisław Śląski (cap. 7,000
2. Warta played 3 home games at Stadion im. Edmunda Szyca (cap. 4,000)

=== Personnel and sponsoring ===
Team	Manager	Chairman	Team captain	Kit maker	Shirt sponsor
Arka Gdynia	(Czech Republic) Petr Němec	(Poland) Witold Nowak	(Poland) Sławomir Mazurkiewicz	Adidas	Polnord, Gdynia
GKS Bogdanka	(Poland) Piotr Rzepka	(Poland) Artur Kapelko	(Serbia) Veljko Nikitović	Jako	Lubelski Węgiel Bogdanka
Dolcan Ząbki	(Poland) Robert Podoliński	(Poland) Jerzy Szczęsny	(Poland) Piotr Kosiorowski	Zina	Dolcan
Flota Świnoujście	(Poland) Ryszard Kłusek	(Poland) Edward Rozwałka	(Poland) Marek Niewiada	Jako	LZ
GKS Katowice	(Poland) Rafał Górak	(Poland) Jacek Krysiak	(Poland) Jacek Kowalczyk	adidas	Ideon
Kolejarz Stróże	(Poland) Przemysław Cecherz	(Poland) Bolesław Dywan	(Poland) Dariusz Walęciak	Nike	FPON^{1}
KS Polkowice	(Poland) Janusz Kudyba	(Poland) Grzegorz Długosz	(Poland) Tomasz Salamoński	Jako	—
Olimpia Elbląg	(Belarus) Oleg Radushko	(Poland) Łukasz Konończuk	(Poland) Marcin Pacan	Adidas	CH Rapsodia
Olimpia Grudziądz	(Poland) Marcin Kaczmarek	(Poland) Jacek Bojarowski	(Poland) Bartłomiej Kowalski	Nike	Grudziądz
Piast Gliwice	(Poland) Marcin Brosz	(Poland) Józef Drabicki	(Poland) Tomasz Podgórski	Adidas	Gliwice
Pogoń Szczecin	(Poland) Ryszard Tarasiewicz	(Poland) Jarosław Mroczek	(Poland) Bartosz Ława	Nike	Bosman
Polonia Bytom	(Poland) Dariusz Fornalak	(Poland) Radosław Nowakowski	(Czech Republic) Lukaš Killar	Hummel	LKJ-Bud, Bytom
Ruch Radzionków	(Poland) Artur Skowronek	(Poland) Tomasz Baran	(Poland) Piotr Rocki	Colo	Radzionków, O&S Computer-Soft
Sandecja Nowy Sącz	(Poland) Robert Moskal	(Poland) Andrzej Danek	(Slovakia) Ján Fröhlich	Adidas	AW Wiśniowski
Termalica Bruk-Bet Nieciecza	(Slovakia) Dušan Radolský	(Poland) Danuta Witkowska	(Poland) Jan Cios	Nike	Termalica
Warta Poznań	(Poland) Czesław Owczarek	(Poland) Marek Łbik	(Poland) Tomasz Magdziarz	Nike	Family House
Wisła Płock	(Czech Republic) Libor Pala	(Poland) Krzysztof Dmoszyński	(Poland) Ariel Jakubowski	Zina	Płock
Zawisza Bydgoszcz	(Ukraine) Yuriy Shatalov	(Poland) Anita Osuch	—	Jako	Solbet

1. Kolejarz displays the charity's logo on their kit.

==== Managerial changes ====
Team	Outgoing manager	Manner of departure	Date of vacancy	Position in table	Incoming manager	Date of appointment
Arka	(Czech Republic) František Straka	End of contract	30 June 2011	Pre-season	(Czech Republic) Petr Němec	12 June 2011
Flota	(Czech Republic) Petr Němec	Signed by Arka	12 June 2011	Pre-season	(Poland) Krzysztof Pawlak	12 June 2011
Olimpia E.	(Poland) Jarosław Araszkiewicz	Resigned	12 June 2011	Pre-season	(Poland) Grzegorz Wesołowski	22 June 2011
Pogoń	(Poland) Jerzy Rot	Temporary manager	12 June 2011	Pre-season	(Poland) Marcin Sasal	12 June 2011
Termalica	(Poland) Piotr Wrześniak	Appointed as goalkeeping coach	14 June 2011	Pre-season	(Slovakia) Dušan Radolský	14 June 2011
Warta	(Poland) Bogusław Baniak	Signed by Miedź Legnica	15 June 2011	Pre-season	(Poland) Czesław Jakołcewicz	22 June 2011
Katowice	(Poland) Wojciech Stawowy	Mutual consent	17 June 2011	Pre-season	(Poland) Rafał Górak	21 June 2011
Bogdanka	(Poland) Mirosław Jabłoński	End of contract	21 June 2011	Pre-season	(Poland) Piotr Rzepka	25 June 2011
Zawisza	(Poland) Adam Topolski	End of contract	22 June 2011	Pre-season	(Poland) Janusz Kubot	22 June 2011
Kolejarz	(Poland) Janusz Kubot	Signed by Zawisza	22 June 2011	Pre-season	(Poland) Przemysław Cecherz	23 June 2011
Warta	(Poland) Czesław Jakołcewicz	Resigned	22 August 2011	10th	(Poland) Piotr Tworek	22 August 2011
Warta	(Poland) Piotr Tworek	Temporary manager	24 August 2011	10th	(Poland) Artur Płatek	24 August 2011
Wisła	(Poland) Mieczysław Broniszewski	Temporary manager	5 September 2011	11th	(Poland) Marek Końko	5 September 2011
Wisła	(Poland) Marek Końko	Temporary manager	8 September 2011	11th	(Czech Republic) Libor Pala	8 September 2011
Polkowice	(Poland) Dominik Nowak	Sacked	14 September 2011	18th	(Poland) Bartłomiej Majewski	14 September 2011
Polkowice	(Poland) Bartłomiej Majewski	Sacked	28 September 2011	18th	(Poland) Janusz Kudyba	28 September 2011
Olimpia E.	(Poland) Grzegorz Wesołowski	Sacked	15 October 2011	18th	(Ukraine) Anatoliy Piskovets	17 October 2011
Warta	(Poland) Artur Płatek	Joined 1. FC Kaiserslautern staff	1 November 2011	10th	(Poland) Jarosław Araszkiewicz	1 November 2011
Sandecja	(Poland) Mariusz Kuras	Sacked	15 November 2011	9th	(Poland) Robert Moskal	15 November 2011
Olimpia E.	(Ukraine) Anatoliy Piskovets	Sacked	9 January 2012	18th	(Poland) Szymon Szałachowski	9 January 2012
Olimpia E.	(Poland) Szymon Szałachowski	Sacked	16 January 2012	18th	(Belarus) Oleg Radushko	16 January 2012
Pogoń	(Poland) Marcin Sasal	Sacked	10 April 2012	1st	(Poland) Ryszard Tarasiewicz	10 April 2012
Zawisza	(Poland) Janusz Kubot	Resigned	18 April 2012	5th	(Ukraine) Yuriy Shatalov	19 April 2012
Warta	(Poland) Jarosław Araszkiewicz	Sacked	25 April 2012	9th	(Poland) Czesław Owczarek	25 April 2012
Flota	(Poland) Krzysztof Pawlak	Sacked	10 May 2012	9th	(Poland) Ryszard Kłusek	10 May 2012

== League table ==
Pos	Team	Pld	W	D	L	GF	GA	GD	Pts	Promotion or relegation
1	Piast Gliwice (C, P)	34	19	7	8	57	40	+17	64	Promotion to Ekstraklasa
2	Pogoń Szczecin (P)	34	18	7	9	54	30	+24	61	Promotion to Ekstraklasa
3	Zawisza Bydgoszcz	34	16	11	7	47	39	+8	59	
4	Kolejarz Stróże	34	16	9	9	40	34	+6	57	
5	Nieciecza	34	15	11	8	42	26	+16	56	
6	GKS Bogdanka	34	15	9	10	50	37	+13	54	
7	Arka Gdynia	34	13	12	9	50	41	+9	51	
8	Flota Świnoujście	34	12	13	9	46	43	+3	49	
9	Ruch Radzionków (Note: Ruch Radzionków withdrew from all professional competition after season, so previously relegated Polonia Bytom took their place in the 2012–13 II liga.) (R)	34	13	9	12	46	51	−5	48	
10	Warta Poznań	34	12	10	12	44	36	+8	46	
11	Olimpia Grudziądz	34	10	13	11	46	41	+5	43	
12	Sandecja Nowy Sącz	34	10	10	14	42	46	−4	40	
13	GKS Katowice	34	9	12	13	33	38	−5	39 (Note: DOL 0–0 GKS; GKS 3–1 DOL)	
14	Dolcan Ząbki	34	10	9	15	40	53	−13	39	
15	Polonia Bytom	34	9	9	16	37	51	−14	36	
16	Wisła Płock (R)	34	9	8	17	39	50	−11	35	Relegation to II liga
17	KS Polkowice (R)	34	7	9	18	40	64	−24	30	Relegation to II liga
18	Olimpia Elbląg (R)	34	4	10	20	33	66	−33	22	Relegation to II liga

Source: 90minut.pl (in Polish)
Rules for classification: 1) points; 2) head-to-head points; 3) head-to-head goal difference; 4) head-to-head goals scored; 5) goal difference; 6) number of goals scored
(C) Champions; (P) Promoted; (R) Relegated

== Results ==
Home \ Away	ARK	GKŁ	DOL	FLO	KAT	KOL	GPK	ELB	GRU	PIA	POG	PBY	RRA	SNS	NIE	WAP	WPK	ZAW
Arka Gdynia		2–2	3–1	1–1	1–1	0–1	2–1	3–1	1–1	2–2	0–2	4–0	1–3	2–0	1–0	0–0	1–0	5–2
Górnik Łęczna	2–1		1–1	5–2	2–0	3–0	3–0	2–0	2–0	2–0	0–1	2–1	0–2	0–2	0–0	1–1	2–1	4–2
Dolcan Ząbki	1–1	0–0		2–2	0–0	1–2	1–1	2–2	0–3	3–1	2–1	0–0	2–0	1–2	1–0	0–2	1–2	1–0
Flota Świnoujście	1–0	1–0	1–2		0–0	0–2	3–0	2–1	0–0	0–0	1–0	0–0	5–1	0–4	1–0	0–0	2–2	1–2
GKS Katowice	0–0	1–0	3–1	0–0		0–1	5–0	1–1	1–0	3–2	0–2	2–0	1–2	2–0	0–1	0–3	0–1	0–1
Kolejarz Stróże	1–1	1–2	2–0	0–0	0–0		3–1	2–2	0–2	0–1	1–1	2–3	2–0	3–2	0–3	1–0	2–0	0–0
Górnik Polkowice	0–1	1–4	3–2	3–2	1–2	1–0		3–1	3–2	0–2	1–1	0–2	3–1	0–0	0–2	0–0	2–2	1–1
Olimpia Elbląg	1–4	1–0	4–1	1–3	2–2	0–2	3–4		0–0	1–3	2–1	2–1	1–2	0–0	0–1	0–2	1–1	0–3
Olimpia Grudziądz	0–0	0–0	0–2	1–2	1–1	4–1	3–2	3–0		2–0	0–0	3–1	4–0	1–1	1–1	2–1	3–3	0–1
Piast Gliwice	2–2	2–2	3–2	3–2	3–0	2–0	1–1	1–0	1–0		2–1	3–1	0–1	2–1	1–1	3–0	2–1	3–0
Pogoń Szczecin	3–1	4–0	2–3	1–0	1–0	1–2	3–2	3–1	1–1	2–1		3–0	5–1	1–0	0–2	2–1	3–0	1–0
Polonia Bytom	1–3	1–1	1–1	1–2	4–2	0–1	1–1	3–2	4–1	0–2	0–3		1–2	2–1	0–0	0–1	2–0	1–1
Ruch Radzionków	2–3	0–1	1–0	2–2	2–2	1–1	4–4	4–1	1–1	1–2	1–1	0–0		1–1	1–0	2–0	1–0	4–1
Sandecja Nowy Sącz	3–0	1–4	1–2	1–1	0–0	1–1	2–1	1–1	3–1	4–0	1–0	2–3	1–2		2–0	0–3	1–3	0–1
Nieciecza	2–1	0–0	2–1	2–3	2–0	1–2	2–0	3–0	2–0	2–3	1–1	1–0	0–0	0–0		2–2	1–0	0–0
Warta Poznań	1–1	2–0	3–0	4–2	2–2	0–1	1–0	2–0	1–2	1–3	1–2	2–0	1–0	1–2	2–2		1–2	0–1
Wisła Płock	0–2	3–1	1–2	0–2	0–2	0–2	1–0	1–1	1–1	1–0	0–0	0–2	2–0	6–1	1–3	3–3		0–1
Zawisza Bydgoszcz	3–0	3–2	3–1	2–2	2–0	1–1	1–0	0–0	4–3	1–1	2–1	1–1	2–1	1–1	2–3	0–0	2–1	

Source: 90minut.pl
Legend: Blue = home team win; Yellow = draw; Red = away team win.

== Statistics ==
=== Top goalscorers ===
As of 27 May 2012.

Rank	Player	Club	Goals
1	(Poland) Wojciech Kędziora	Piast Gliwice	18
2	(Poland) Arkadiusz Aleksander	Sandecja Nowy Sącz	16
3	(Poland) Adrian Błąd	Zawisza Bydgoszcz	14
3	(Poland) Maciej Tataj	Dolcan Ząbki	14
5	(Spain) Rubén Jurado	Piast Gliwice	12
5	(Brazil) Nildo França Júnior	GKS Bogdanka	12
5	(Brazil) Ricardinho	Wisła Płock	12
5	(Poland) Jakub Świerczok	Polonia Bytom	12
7	(Brazil) Andradina	Pogoń Szczecin	11
7	(Poland) Wojciech Łuczak	Wisła Płock	11

=== Hat-tricks ===
Player	For	Against	Result	Date
(Poland) Arkadiusz Aleksander	Sandecja Nowy Sącz	Arka Gdynia	3–0	7 August 2011
(Poland) Jakub Świerczok	Polonia Bytom	Olimpia Grudziądz	4–1	2 September 2011
(Brazil) Nildo França Júnior	GKS Bogdanka	KS Polkowice	3–0	3 September 2011
(Poland) Jakub Świerczok	Polonia Bytom	GKS Katowice	4–2	7 October 2011
(Poland) Dawid Wacławczyk	KS Polkowice	Dolcan Ząbki	3–2	19 November 2011
(Poland) Tomasz Chałas	Olimpia Elbląg	Dolcan Ząbki	4–1	20 May 2012
(Brazil) Ricardinho	Wisła Płock	Warta Poznań	3–3	27 May 2012

=== Scoring ===
- First goal of the season: Dariusz Pawlusiński for Termalica against GKS Katowice (22 July 2011)
- Fastest goal of the season: 24 seconds – Wojciech Kędziora for Piast Gliwice against Termalica (13 April 2012)
- Most goals in a game: 8 goals
  - Radzionków 4–4 Polkowice (20 May 2012)
- Most goals scored in a game by one team: 6 goals
  - Wisła 6–1 Sandecja (12 November 2011)
- Most goals scored in a match by a losing team: 3 goals
  - Zawisza 4–3 Olimpia G. (18 March 2012)
  - Elbląg 3–4 Polkowice (4 May 2012)
- Largest winning margin: 5 goals
  - Katowice 5–0 Polkowice (14 September 2011)
  - Wisła 6–1 Sandecja (12 November 2011)
- Widest away winning margin: 4 goals
  - Flota 0–4 Sandecja (9 May 2012)
- Highest scoring draw: 8 goals
  - Radzionków 4–4 Polkowice
- Most games failed to score in: 17
  - GKS Katowice
- Fewest games failed to score in: 5
  - Pogoń Szczecin

=== Disciplinary record by team ===
As of 27 May 2012

Rank	Team	Yellow card	Red card
1	Termalica Bruk-Bet Nieciecza	64	3
2	Polonia Bytom	69	4
3	Ruch Radzionków	71	4
4	Arka Gdynia	75	3
5	KS Polkowice	74	5
6	Wisła Płock	78	4
7	Warta Poznań	75	7
8	Pogoń Szczecin	82	4
9	GKS Katowice	85	5
10	Olimpia Grudziądz	77	9
11	Piast Gliwice	81	7
12	Sandecja Nowy Sącz	83	6
13	Flota Świnoujście	89	5
14	Dolcan Ząbki	87	7
15	Kolejarz Stróże	81	10
16	Olimpia Elbląg	84	9
17	GKS Bogdanka	97	7
18	Zawisza Bydgoszcz	103	5

- Most yellow cards (player): 12 – Arkadiusz Baran (Termalica Bruk-Bet Nieciecza), Błażej Jankowski (Zawisza Bydgoszcz)
- Most red cards (player): 2 – Radosław Bartoszewicz (GKS Bogdanka), Jan Buryán (Piast Gliwice), Janusz Dziedzic (Olimpia Grudziądz), Cheikh Niane (Kolejarz Stróże), Marcin Nowak (KS Polkowice), Grzegorz Piesio (Dolcan Ząbki), Michał Renusz (GKS Bogdanka), Dawid Szufryn (Kolejarz Stróże), Wojciech Wilczyński (Arka Gdynia, Polonia Bytom)

=== Clean sheets ===
- Most clean sheets: 17
  - Termalica Bruk-Bet Nieciecza
- Fewest clean sheets: 3
  - KS Polkowice
