= 2012–13 I liga =

I liga
- Season: 2012–13
- Champions: Zawisza Bydgoszcz
- Promoted: Zawisza Bydgoszcz; Cracovia
- Relegated: Warta Poznań; Polonia Bytom; ŁKS Łódź
- Matches: 291
- Goals: 730 (2.51 per match)
- Top goalscorer: Maciej Kowalczyk (22 goals)
- Biggest home win: Ząbki 5–0 Łęczna; Tychy 5–0 Warta
- Biggest away win: ŁKS 1–7 Flota
- Highest scoring: ŁKS 1–7 Flota
- Longest winning run: 8 games Dolcan; Flota
- Longest unbeaten run: 12 games Flota
- Longest winless run: 18 games Bytom
- Longest losing run: 6 games Bytom
- Highest attendance: 10,348; Cracovia 1–0 Sandecja (3 November 2012)
- Lowest attendance: 150 (Note: Match played in Jaworzno.); Tychy 1–0 Miedź (19 September 2012)
- Average attendance: 2,026 ▼9.9%

The 2012–13 I liga was the 65th season of the second tier domestic division in the Polish football league system since its establishment in 1949 and the 5th season of the Polish I liga under its current title. The league was operated by the Polish Football Association (PZPN).

The league is contested by 18 teams who competing for promotion to the 2013–14 Ekstraklasa. The regular season was played in a round-robin tournament. The champions and runners-up would receive promotion. The bottom four teams were automatically demoted to the II liga.

According to the competition rules, all clubs are required to field at least one youth player (born on 1992 or later and trained in Poland) in every game (except for the times when the only youth player on the roster is sent off or unable to continue playing, in which case he can't be substituted by a senior player).

On 28 February 2013 the Disciplinary Commission of the Polish FA suspended the ŁKS's license to compete in the I liga, because of non-payment of salaries to former players. Since the club's appeal was unsuccessful, on 5 April the Polish FA announced the cancellation of Warta–ŁKS game on the 22nd match day. On 10 April the club announced its withdrawal from the I liga. As ŁKS had already played over 50% of their games, according to the rules of I liga, they will be ranked in the final league table, with the cancelled games counted as lost 0–3.

== Changes from last season ==
=== From I liga ===
Promoted to 2011–12 Ekstraklasa

- Piast Gliwice
- Pogoń Szczecin

Relegated to II liga, Group East

- Wisła Płock
- Olimpia Elbląg

Relegated to II liga, Group West

- KS Polkowice

Withdrew (see below)

- Ruch Radzionków

=== To I liga ===
Relegated from 2011–12 Ekstraklasa

- ŁKS Łódź
- Cracovia

Promoted from II liga, Group East

- Okocimski KS Brzesko
- Stomil Olsztyn

Promoted from II liga, Group West

- Miedź Legnica
- GKS Tychy

=== Additionalnotes ===
Before the start of the season Ruch Radzionków withdrew from 2012 to 2013 I liga, citing financial problems. The club also withdrew its reserve team from Bytom region Klasa A (7th level). However, Ruch will be able to join the 2013–14 III liga, after a one-year suspension.

Ruch's I liga spot was taken by another Silesian club, Polonia Bytom, the highest placed team of the previous season's I liga relegation zone.

== Team overview ==
=== Stadiums and locations ===
Location of teams and stadiums in 2012–13 I liga
Location of teams in the Metropolis GZM

Team	Stadium	Capacity
Arka Gdynia	Stadion Miejski	15,139
Cracovia	Stadion im. Józefa Piłsudskiego	15,016
Dolcan Ząbki	Stadion Miejski	2,100
Flota Świnoujście	Stadion Miejski	4,500
GKS Bogdanka	Stadion Górnika	7,200
GKS Katowice	Stadion GKS Katowice	9,511
GKS Tychy	Stadion Miejski w Jaworznie	7,000
Kolejarz Stróże	Stadion Kolejarza	2,000
ŁKS Łódź	Stadion ŁKS	7,000
Miedź Legnica	Stadion im. Orła Białego	6,244
Okocimski KS Brzesko	Stadion Miejski	3,000
Olimpia Grudziądz	Stadion Centralny	5,250
Polonia Bytom	Stadion im. Edwarda Szymkowiaka	6,000
Sandecja Nowy Sącz	Stadion im. Ojca Władysława Augustynka	5,000
Stomil Olsztyn	Stadion Miejski	16,800
Nieciecza	Stadion Nieciecza	2,093
Warta Poznań	Stadion Lecha	41,609
Zawisza Bydgoszcz	Stadion Miejski im. Zdzisława Krzyszkowiaka	20,247

=== Personnel and sponsoring ===
Team	Manager	Chairman	Team captain	Kit maker	Shirt sponsor
Arka Gdynia	(Poland) Paweł Sikora	(Poland) Wojciech Petrkiewicz	(Poland) Tomasz Jarzębowski	Adidas	Polnord, Gdynia
Cracovia	(Poland) Wojciech Stawowy	(Poland) Janusz Filipiak	(Poland) Arkadiusz Radomski	Nike	Comarch
Dolcan Ząbki	(Poland) Robert Podoliński	(Poland) Jerzy Szczęsny	Maciej Tataj	Zina	Dolcan
Flota Świnoujście	(Poland) Dominik Nowak	(Poland) Edward Rozwałka	(Poland) Marek Niewiada	Jako	LZ
GKS Bogdanka	(Poland) Piotr Rzepka	(Poland) Artur Kapelko	(Serbia) Veljko Nikitović	Jako	Lubelski Węgiel Bogdanka
GKS Katowice	(Poland) Rafał Górak	(Poland) Jacek Krysiak	(Poland) Adrian Napierała	adidas	Ideon
GKS Tychy	(Poland) Piotr Mandrysz	(Poland) Alina Sowa	(Poland) Łuczak Kopczyk	Nike	RPWiK Tychy, Tyski Sport
Kolejarz Stróże	(Poland) Przemysław Cecherz	(Poland) Bolesław Dywan	(Poland) Dariusz Walęciak	Nike	FPON^{1}
ŁKS Łódź	(Poland) Marek Chojnacki	(Poland) Maciej Janicki	(Poland) Bogusław Wyparło	Zina	Colorit
Miedź Legnica	(Poland) Bogusław Baniak	(Poland) Martyna Pajączek	(Poland) Kamil Hempel	Givova	DSA SA
Okocimski KS Brzesko	(Poland) Krzysztof Łętocha	(Poland) Czesław Kwaśniak	(Poland) Mateusz Pawłowicz	Select	Okocim, Imex
Olimpia Grudziądz	(Poland) Tomasz Asensky	(Poland) Jacek Bojarowski	(Poland) Bartłomiej Kowalski	Nike	Grudziądz
Polonia Bytom	(Poland) Jacek Trzeciak	(Poland) Radosław Nowakowski	Mateusz Mika	Hummel	LKJ-Bud, Bytom
Sandecja Nowy Sącz	(Poland) Janusz Świerad	(Poland) Andrzej Danek	(Slovakia) Ján Fröhlich	Adidas	AW Wiśniowski
Stomil Olsztyn	(Poland) Zbigniew Kaczmarek	(Poland) Jacek Czałpiński	(Poland) Janusz Bucholc	R-Gol	DBK
Termalica Bruk-Bet Nieciecza	(Poland) Kazimierz Moskal	(Poland) Danuta Witkowska	Karol Piątek	Nike	Termalica
Warta Poznań	(Poland) Czesław Owczarek	(Poland) Marek Łbik	(Poland) Tomasz Magdziarz	Nike	Family House
Zawisza Bydgoszcz	(Ukraine) Yuriy Shatalov	(Poland) Anita Osuch	(Poland) Łukasz Skrzyński	Jako	Solbet

1. Kolejarz displays the charity's logo on their kit.

==== Managerial changes ====
Team	Outgoing manager	Manner of departure	Date of vacancy	Position in table	Incoming manager	Date of appointment
Termalica	(Slovakia) Dušan Radolský	Resigned	28 May 2012	Pre-season	(Poland) Kazimierz Moskal	14 June 2011
ŁKS Łódź	(Poland) Andrzej Pyrdoł		1 June 2012	Pre-season	(Poland) Marek Chojnacki	1 June 2011
Cracovia	(Poland) Tomasz Kafarski	Mutual consent	11 June 2012	Pre-season	(Poland) Wojciech Stawowy	11 June 2011
Sandecja	(Poland) Robert Moskal	End of contract	11 June 2012	Pre-season	(Poland) Jarosław Araszkiewicz	11 June 2011
Olimpia	(Poland) Marcin Kaczmarek	End of contract	15 June 2012	Pre-season	(Poland) Tomasz Asensky	15 June 2011
Polonia	(Poland) Dariusz Fornalak	End of contract	30 June 2012	Pre-season	(Poland) Piotr Pierścionek	2 July 2012
Flota	(Poland) Ryszard Kłusek	Failed to renew his coaching licence	26 July 2012	Pre-season	(Poland) Dominik Nowak	26 July 2012
Polonia	(Poland) Piotr Pierścionek	Sacked	2 October 2012	18th	(Poland) Dominik Nowak	2 October 2012
Sandecja	(Poland) Jarosław Araszkiewicz	Sacked	2 October 2012	11th	(Poland) Janusz Świerad	2 October 2012
Polonia	(Poland) Piotr Pierścionek		2 October 2012	18th	(Poland) Jacek Trzeciak	2 October 2012
Arka	(Czech Republic) Petr Němec	Sacked	14 November 2012	10th	(Poland) Paweł Sikora	14 November 2012
ŁKS	(Poland) Marek Chojnacki	Mutual consent	13 December 2012	16th	(Poland) Piotr Zajączkowski	15 January 2013
Warta	(Poland) Czesław Owczarek	Mutual consent	21 December 2012	10th	(Poland) Maciej Borowski	15 January 2013
Sandecja	(Poland) Janusz Świerad		18 January 2013	14th	(Poland) Mirosław Hajdo	18 January 2013
Warta	(Poland) Maciej Borowski	Appointed goalkeeping coach	2 April 2013	14th	(Poland) Krzysztof Pawlak	2 April 2013
Flota	(Poland) Dominik Nowak	Mutual consent	10 April 2013	2nd	(Poland) Tomasz Kafarski	11 April 2013
Okocimski KS	(Poland) Krzysztof Łętocha		11 April 2013	17th	(Poland) Czesław Palik	11 April 2013
Zawisza	(Ukraine) Yuri Shatalov	Mutual consent	26 April 2013	7th	(Poland) Ryszard Tarasiewicz	27 April 2013

== League table ==
Pos	Team	Pld	W	D	L	GF	GA	GD	Pts	Promotion or relegation
1	Zawisza Bydgoszcz (P)	34	19	9	6	69	26	+43	66	Promotion to Ekstraklasa
2	Cracovia (P)	34	19	7	8	48	35	+13	64	Promotion to Ekstraklasa
3	Nieciecza	34	19	6	9	54	28	+26	63 (Note: NIE 4–0 FLO; FLO 4–1 NIE)	
4	Flota Świnoujście	34	19	6	9	57	33	+24	63	
5	Arka Gdynia	34	17	6	11	46	29	+17	57	
6	GKS Tychy	34	15	10	9	44	28	+16	55	
7	Dolcan Ząbki	34	16	6	12	52	41	+11	54	
8	Miedź Legnica	34	15	8	11	49	42	+7	53	
9	Olimpia Grudziądz	34	13	12	9	39	34	+5	51	
10	GKS Katowice	34	14	8	12	43	36	+7	50 (Note: KAT 2–0 KOL; KOL 2–2 KAT)	
11	Kolejarz Stróże	34	14	8	12	47	45	+2	50	
12	GKS Bogdanka	34	11	13	10	37	42	−5	46	
13	Stomil Olsztyn	34	8	14	12	37	45	−8	38	
14	Sandecja Nowy Sącz	34	10	7	17	35	54	−19	37	
15	Okocimski KS Brzesko (Note: Although Okocimski KS originally finished the season in the relegation zone, they stayed in I liga, since Polonia Warsaw (who were demoted from 2012–13 Ekstraklasa) failed to meet the financial requirements set by the Polish FA for 2013–14 I liga teams.)	34	7	11	16	38	54	−16	32	
16	Warta Poznań (R)	34	7	7	20	34	57	−23	28	Relegation to II liga
17	Polonia Bytom (R)	34	5	7	22	29	64	−35	22	Relegation to II liga
18	ŁKS Łódź (Note: ŁKS withdrew from the competition after 22nd round.) (R)	34	3	5	26	17	82	−65	14	Relegation to II liga

Source: 90minut.pl (in Polish)
Rules for classification: 1) points; 2) head-to-head points; 3) head-to-head goal difference; 4) head-to-head goals scored; 5) goal difference; 6) number of goals scored
(P) Promoted; (R) Relegated

== Results ==
Home \ Away	ARK	CRA	DOL	FLO	BOG	KAT	TYC	KOL	ŁKS	MLE	OKO	GRU	PBY	SNS	STO	NIE	WAP	ZAW
Arka Gdynia		1–1	1–2	0–1	2–0	1–2	2–1	3–1	3–0 (Note: Match cancelled due to ŁKS withdrawing from the competition.)	1–0	3–1	0–1	3–1	3–0	0–1	0–1	2–0	0–1
Cracovia	1–0		0–2	1–1	2–0	1–0	0–1	2–2	4–2	1–1	1–0	0–0	2–0	1–0	1–0	2–1	2–1	3–1
Dolcan Ząbki	1–4	3–1		0–1	5–0	2–0	0–1	1–4	1–1	1–1	1–0	2–0	4–1	1–1	2–0	0–1	2–0	1–0
Flota Świnoujście	3–0	1–2	2–0		3–1	3–1	1–0	0–1	3–0	1–1	1–0	1–0	2–0	4–0	0–1	4–1	2–1	0–3
GKS Bogdanka	2–1	0–2	2–1	1–1		2–1	2–0	1–0	3–0	2–2	1–2	2–1	3–1	2–2	0–0	1–0	3–1	1–1
GKS Katowice	1–2	1–1	1–0	2–0	1–0		1–0	2–0	1–2	0–2	1–2	1–1	4–2	0–0	4–2	1–2	1–1	1–0
GKS Tychy	0–0	2–0	1–2	1–0	0–0	1–1		1–1	3–1	1–0	0–1	2–1	0–0	1–1	0–0	0–3	5–0	2–2
Kolejarz Stróże	1–1	0–1	2–3	1–2	3–0	2–2	2–1		2–1	2–1	3–0	0–0	1–3	1–0	2–2	0–1	1–0	2–1
ŁKS Łódź	0–2	0–3	0–3	1–7	1–1	0–1	0–3	0–3		0–1	0–3	0–3	0–3	3–2	0–2	0–3	0–2	1–1
Miedź Legnica	1–1	1–3	3–2	0–2	2–0	0–2	2–1	0–0	3–0		0–0	2–1	1–0	3–1	1–2	2–1	5–2	1–2
Okocimski KS Brzesko	1–1	0–2	1–2	2–2	1–1	1–4	1–3	1–1	0–1	2–2		0–0	1–1	0–1	3–3	1–2	2–0	1–4
Olimpia Grudziądz	0–1	2–0	0–0	2–1	1–1	2–1	1–3	2–1	3–1	2–0	0–0		2–2	2–2	2–1	0–0	4–2	1–0
Polonia Bytom	0–1	1–3	3–1	2–1	0–1	1–1	0–3	0–1	1–1	1–3	0–3	1–2		0–1	1–1	0–3	2–0	0–4
Sandecja Nowy Sącz	1–2	1–2	2–1	0–2	1–0	0–2	1–2	1–2	3–0	1–0	4–3	2–0	3–0		0–2	0–0	0–1	0–5
Stomil Olsztyn	0–2	3–0	1–2	1–1	2–2	0–0	1–1	2–3	0–0	1–2	0–4	1–1	0–0	4–0		0–0	0–2	0–5
Nieciecza	3–2	2–0	3–1	4–0	0–0	1–0	1–3	4–2	3–1	1–2	4–0	1–1	3–0	0–1	1–0		3–0	0–1
Warta Poznań	0–1	2–2	2–2	1–2	1–1	0–2	0–1	4–0	3–0	0–3 (Note: Match declared forfeited due to Warta fielding an ilegible player. The game ended in a 2–2 tie.)	1–1	0–1	2–1	2–2	1–1	2–0		0–1
Zawisza Bydgoszcz	0–0	3–1	1–1	2–2	1–1	2–0	0–0	2–0	3–0	5–1	4–0	3–0	3–1	3–1	2–3	1–1	2–0	

Source: 90minut.pl (in Polish)
Legend: Blue = home team win; Yellow = draw; Red = away team win.

== Season statistics ==
=== Top scorers ===
Rank	Player	Club	Goals
1	(Poland) Maciej Kowalczyk	Kolejarz Stróże	22
2	(Poland) Paweł Abbott	Zawisza Bydgoszcz	15
2	(Montenegro) Vladimir Boljević	Cracovia	15
2	(Brazil) Marcus Vinicius	Arka Gdynia	15
5	(Poland) Arkadiusz Aleksander	Sandecja / Flota	13
5	(Poland) Jakub Grzegorzewski	Miedź Legnica	13
5	(Poland) Dariusz Pawlusiński	Termalica Bruk-Bet Nieciecza	13
5	(Poland) Mateusz Piątkowski	Dolcan Ząbki	13
5	(Poland) Przemysław Pitry	GKS Katowice	13
10	(Poland) Sebastian Olszar	Flota Świnoujście	11
10	(Latvia) Deniss Rakels	GKS Katowice	11

=== Clean sheets (player) ===
Rank	Player	Club	Clean sheets
1	(Poland) Sebastian Nowak	Termalica	16
2	(Poland) Piotr Misztal	GKS Tychy	13
3	(Poland) Grzegorz Kasprzik	Flota	11
3	(Poland) Krzysztof Pilarz	Cracovia	11
3	(Poland) Michał Wróbel	Olimpia Grudziądz	11
6	(Poland) Łukasz Budziłek	GKS Katowice	9
6	(Poland) Marcin Cabaj	Sandecja	9
6	(Poland) Rafał Leszczyński	Dolcan	9
9	(Poland) Wojciech Kaczmarek	Zawisza	8
9	(Poland) Piotr Skiba	Stomil	8

=== Scoring ===
- First goal of the season: Zbigniew Zakrzewski for Miedź against Bogdanka (4 August 2012)
- Largest winning margin: 6 goals
  - ŁKS 1–7 Flota (6 October 2012)
- Highest scoring game: 8 goals
  - ŁKS 1–7 Flota (6 October 2012)
- Most goals scored in a match by a single team: 7 goals
  - ŁKS 1–7 Flota (6 October 2012)
- Most goals scored in a match by a losing team: 2 goals
  - Stomil 2–3 Kolejarz (13 April 2013)
  - Kolejarz 2–3 Dolcan (21 April 2013)

=== Clean sheets (club) ===
- Most clean sheets: 16
  - Termalica
- Fewest clean sheets: 2
  - ŁKS

=== Discipline ===
- Most yellow cards (club): 97
  - Sandecja Nowy Sącz
- Most yellow cards (player): 11
  - Tomáš Pešír (Bogdanka)
- Most red cards (club): 10
  - Stomil Olsztyn
  - Warta Poznań
- Most red cards (player): 2
  - Martin Baran (Polonia Bytom)
  - Paweł Baranowski (Stomil)
  - Michał Benkowski (Bogdanka)
  - Grzegorz Fonfara (Katowice)
  - Michał Masłowski (Zawisza)
  - Michał Nalepa (Termalica)
  - Marcin Pietroń (Katowice)
  - Dawid Sołdecki (Bogdanka)
  - Łukasz Skrzyński (Zawisza)
  - Dawid Szufryn (Kolejarz)
  - Maciej Wichtowski (Warta)
  - Konrad Wieczorek (Okocimski KS)
