= Artur Prokop =

Polish footballer

Personal information
- Full name: Artur Prokop
- Date of birth: 18 December 1972 (age 53)
- Place of birth: Tarnów, Poland
- Height: 1.78 m (5 ft 10 in)
- Position: Midfielder

Team information
- Current team: LKS Szynwałd
- Number: 99

Senior career*
Years	Team	Apps	(Gls)
1994–1995	Tarnovia Tarnów		
1995–1996	Unia Tarnów		
1996–2000	Hutnik Kraków		
2000–2004	RKS Radomsko	91+	(5+)
2004–2005	Podbeskidzie Bielsko-Biała	31	(3)
2005–2007	Górnik Zabrze	50	(5)
2007–2008	Kolejarz Stróże	45	(11)
2009–2011	LKS Nieciecza	70	(8)
2011–2012	Limanovia Limanowa	23	(5)
2012–2015	Poroniec Poronin	55+	(3+)
2015–2017	Jadowniczanka Jadowniki		
2017–2019	Tuchovia Tuchów	53	(0)
2020–2021	Unia Niedomice	25	(0)
2021–2022	Tuchovia Tuchów	11	(0)
2023–	LKS Szynwałd	51	(1)
- * Club domestic league appearances and goals as of 19:38, 5 July 2026 (UTC)

Artur Prokop (born 18 December 1972) is a Polish footballer who plays as a midfielder for LKS Szynwałd. He previously played in the Ekstraklasa for Hutnik Kraków, RKS Radomsko and Górnik Zabrze.

== Honours ==
LKS Nieciecza

- II liga East: 2009–10

Jadowniczanka Jadowniki

- Regional league Tarnów I: 2015–16
