= Cieśliński =

Cieśliński is a Polish surname. Notable people with the surname include:

- Adam Cieśliński (born 1982), Polish footballer
- Janusz Tadeusz Cieśliński (born 1954), Polish engineer and academic
