= Aleksander Ptak =

Polish footballer

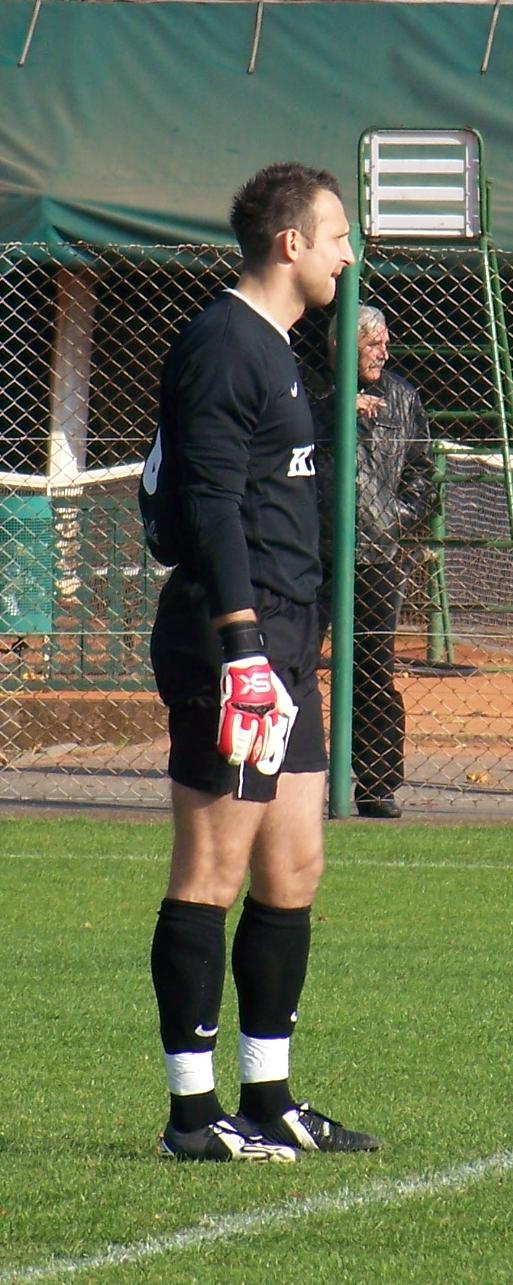

Personal information
- Full name: Aleksander Ptak
- Date of birth: 4 November 1977 (age 48)
- Place of birth: Wałcz, Poland
- Height: 1.86 m (6 ft 1 in)
- Position: Goalkeeper

Team information
- Current team: Górnik Polkowice (goalkeeping coach)

Youth career
- –1996: Orzeł Biały Wałcz

Senior career*
Years	Team	Apps	(Gls)
1996–2005	GKS Bełchatów	215	(0)
2005–2007	Dyskobolia Grodzisk Wlkp.	17	(0)
2007–2012	Zagłębie Lubin	91	(0)
2012–2014	Miedź Legnica	60	(0)
2015	KS Polkowice		
2015–2016	Miedź Legnica II	2	(0)
Total		385	(0)

Managerial career
- 2015–2016: Miedź Legnica II (goalkeeping coach)
- 2016–2023: Miedź Legnica (goalkeeping coach)
- 2023–: Górnik Polkowice (goalkeeping coach)
- * Club domestic league appearances and goals

Aleksander Ptak (born 4 November 1977) is a Polish former professional footballer who played as a goalkeeper. He is currently the goalkeeping coach of Górnik Polkowice.

== Career ==
=== Club ===
Since 1996 to 2005 he has played for GKS Bełchatów. In 2005, he moved to the Dyskobolia Grodzisk Wlkp., which played for two years. In 2007, he joined Zagłębie Lubin.

== Honours ==
Dyskobolia Grodzisk Wlkp

- Polish Cup: 2006–07
- Ekstraklasa Cup: 2006–07

== Notes ==
- Aleksander Ptak at 90minut.pl (in Polish)
