= Walid Kandel =

Egyptian footballer (born 1985)

Personal information
- Full name: Walid Mohamed Kandel El-Said
- Date of birth: 24 March 1985 (age 41)
- Place of birth: Egypt
- Height: 1.79 m (5 ft 10 in)
- Position: Defender

Team information
- Current team: KS Szyk (manager)

Senior career*
Years	Team	Apps	(Gls)
–2007	Zamalek		
2007–2008	Tersana		
2008–2009	Ghazl El Mahalla		
2009–2012	Asyut Petroleum		
2013	Sohag		
2014	UKS Łady		
2014–2017	Limanovia Limanowa	13+	(1+)

International career
2007	Egypt U20	1	(0)

Managerial career
- 2015–2017: Limanovia Limanowa (player-assistant)
- 2018–2020: Zalesianka Zalesie
- 2019–2021: Hutnik Kraków II
- 2019: Limanovia Limanowa
- 2023: Poprad Muszyna
- 2024–2025: Kolejarz Stróże
- 2025–: KS Szyk
- * Club domestic league appearances and goals

Walid Mohamed Kandel El-Said (Arabic: وليد قنديل; born 24 March 1985) is an Egyptian football manager and former player who is currently in charge of Polish club KS Szyk.

== Club career ==
Kandel started his career with Egyptian top flight side Zamalek. In 2007, he signed for Tersana in the Egyptian top flight. Before the second half of 2012–13, Kandel signed for Egyptian second-tier club Sohag. Before the second half of 2013–14, he signed for UKS Łady in the Polish fifth tier after trialing for Polish top flight team Jagiellonia Białystok. In 2014, Kandel signed for Limanovia Limanowa in the Polish third tier, where he suffered relegation to the Polish sixth tier due to sponsorship problems.

== International career ==
He represented Egypt at the 2005 FIFA World Youth Championship.

== Managerial statistics ==
As of match played 13 June 2026

Managerial record by team and tenure
Team	From	To	Record							
Team	From	To	G	W	D	L	GF	GA	GD	Win %
Hutnik Kraków II	22 July 2019	25 June 2021	46	24	6	16	147	97	+50	52.17
Limanovia Limanowa	21 October 2019	4 December 2019	3	2	1	0	6	2	+4	66.67
Poprad Muszyna	5 July 2023	30 November 2023	21	7	4	10	46	43	+3	33.33
Kolejarz Stróże	14 January 2024	18 November 2025	64	30	14	20	95	80	+15	46.88
KS Szyk	1 December 2025	Present	11	5	1	5	15	18	−3	45.45
Total			145	68	26	51	309	240	+69	46.90

== Honours ==
=== Player ===
Limanovia Limanowa

- IV liga Lesser Poland East: 2016–17
- Regional league Nowy Sącz: 2015–16

=== Managerial ===
Poprad Muszyna

- Polish Cup (Nowy Sącz regionals): 2023–24
