= Mariusz Mężyk =

Polish footballer

Personal information
- Full name: Mariusz Mężyk
- Date of birth: 2 September 1983 (age 43)
- Place of birth: Nowy Sącz, Poland
- Height: 1.77 m (5 ft 10 in)
- Position: Striker

Senior career*
Years	Team	Apps	(Gls)
1999–2002	Dunajec Nowy Sącz		
2003	Glinik/Karpatia Gorlice		
2003–2004	Pogoń Staszów		
2004	KSZO Ostrowiec	9	(0)
2005	Tłoki Gorzyce		
2005	Sandecja Nowy Sącz		
2005–2006	ŁKS Łódź	11	(1)
2006–2008	Polonia Bytom	49	(13)
2008	Sandecja Nowy Sącz	3	(1)
2009–2012	Kolejarz Stróże	65	(14)
2012–2014	Limanovia Limanowa	56	(15)
2014–2016	Poprad Muszyna	12	(2)
- * Club domestic league appearances and goals

Mariusz Mężyk (born 2 September 1983) is a Polish former professional footballer who played as a striker.

== Career ==
In the summer of 2009, he joined Kolejarz Stróże.

== Honours ==
Limanovia Limanowa

- III liga Lesser Poland–Świętokrzyskie: 2012–13
