= Maciej Kowalczyk =

Polish footballer

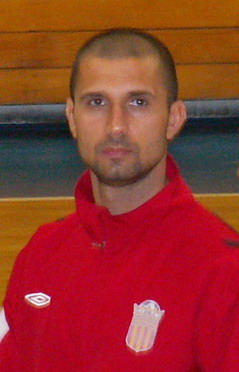

Personal information
- Date of birth: 6 March 1977 (age 49)
- Place of birth: Wrocław, Poland
- Height: 1.81 m (5 ft 11 1/2 in)
- Position: Forward

Youth career
- Włókniarz Wrocław

Senior career*
Years	Team	Apps	(Gls)
1993–1994	Parasol Wrocław		
1994–1996	Ślęza Wrocław		
1996–1998	Parasol Wrocław		
1998–2000	Ceramika Opoczno	69	(16)
2000–2001	Śląsk Wrocław	25	(1)
2001	Ceramika Opoczno	19	(6)
2002–2006	Arsenal Kyiv	71	(12)
2002	→ Borysfen Boryspil (loan)	4	(3)
2003–2004	→ CSKA Kyiv (loan)	11	(2)
2003–2004	→ Arsenal-2 Kyiv	4	(0)
2006–2008	Korona Kielce	41	(8)
2008	→ Widzew Łódź (loan)	9	(1)
2008–2010	Lechia Gdańsk	38	(3)
2010–2011	Sandecja Nowy Sącz	25	(1)
2011–2013	Kolejarz Stróże	62	(28)
2013–2014	Olimpia Grudziądz	25	(3)
2014–2015	GKS Tychy	33	(11)
2015–2017	MKS Kluczbork	53	(8)
2017	Bystrzyca Kąty Wrocławskie	2	(0)
2017–2021	Piast Żerniki	78	(34)
- * Club domestic league appearances and goals

Maciej Kowalczyk (born 6 March 1977) is a Polish former professional footballer who played as a forward.

== Career ==
Kowalczyk came to Lechia Gdańsk from Korona Kielce.

In June 2011, he joined Kolejarz Stróże.

== Honours ==
Individual

- I liga Player of the Year: 2012
- I liga top scorer: 2012–13
