= Bodziony =

Bodziony may refer to:

- Mount Bodziony, Antarctic mountain
- Krzysztof Bodziony (born 1985), Polish footballer
