= Jan Buryán =

Czech footballer and manager (born 1977)

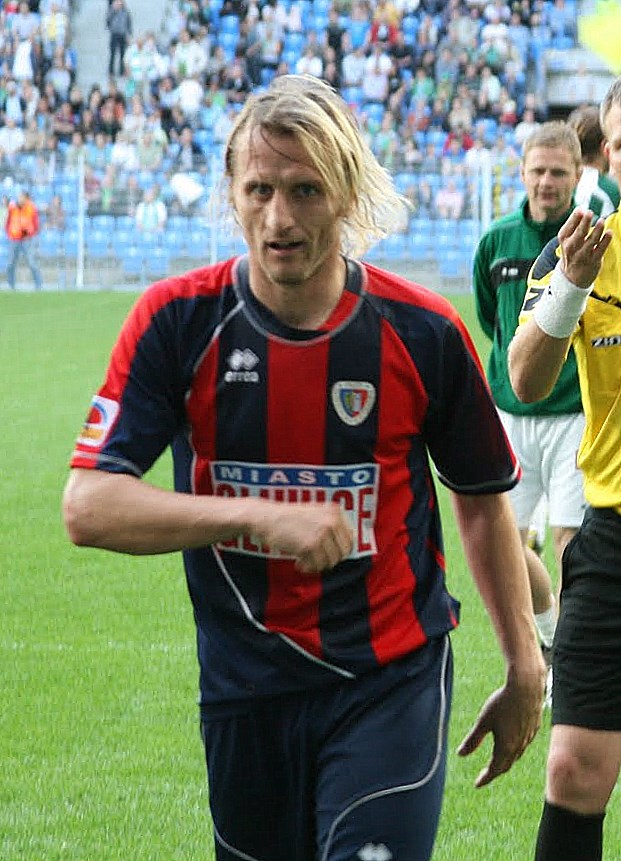

Personal information
- Date of birth: 17 February 1977 (age 49)
- Place of birth: Benátky nad Jizerou, Czechoslovakia
- Height: 1.80 m (5 ft 11 in)
- Position: Defender

Youth career
- 1983–1988: Benátky nad Jizerou
- 1988–1995: Mladá Boleslav

Senior career*
| Years | Team | Apps | (Gls) |
| 1995–2005 | Viktoria Žižkov | 213+ | (7) |
| 1995 | → Brandýs nad Labem (loan) | | |
| 2005–2006 | Marila Příbram | 27 | (3) |
| 2006–2008 | Artmedia Petržalka | 28 | (0) |
| 2008 | Dukla Praha | | |
| 2008–2010 | Karviná | 48 | (1) |
| 2010–2013 | Piast Gliwice | 54 | (2) |
| 2013–2014 | Benátky nad Jizerou | | |

Managerial career
- 2018: Benátky nad Jizerou
- 2018–2019: Polaban Nymburk
- * Club domestic league appearances and goals

Jan Buryán (born 17 February 1977) is a Czech football manager and former player who played as a defender.

Buryán played over 200 matches in the Czech First League, mostly for Viktoria Žižkov, with one season at Marila Příbram. He most recently played for Czech lower division side Benátky nad Jizerou.

== Honours ==
Viktoria Žižkov

- Czech Cup: 2000–01

Piast Gliwice

- I liga: 2011–12
