= Krzysztof Markowski =

Polish footballer

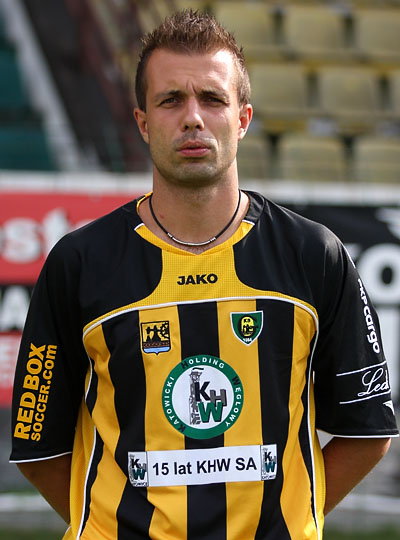
- Markowski with GKS Katowice in 2008

Personal information
- Date of birth: 24 September 1979 (age 47)
- Place of birth: Zabrze, Poland
- Height: 1.85 m (6 ft 1 in)
- Position: Defender

Senior career*
Years	Team	Apps	(Gls)
1997–1998	Górnik Zabrze II		
1998–1999	Sparta Zabrze		
2000–2003	Ruch Radzionków		
2003	Sparta Zabrze		
2004–2005	GKS Katowice	37	(4)
2005–2006	Polonia Warsaw	13	(0)
2006–2008	GKS Katowice	51	(4)
2009–2010	Odra Wodzisław	34	(0)
2011	Zagłębie Sosnowiec	16	(2)
2011–2014	Kolejarz Stróże	101	(6)
2014–2017	Zagłębie Sosnowiec	80	(4)
2017–2018	Polonia Bytom	31	(12)
2018–2019	Warta Kamieńskie Młyny	33	(6)
2019–2023	Cyklon Rogoźnik	95	(18)
2023	Warta Kamieńskie Młyny	27	(0)
- * Club domestic league appearances and goals

Krzysztof Markowski (born 24 September 1979) is a Polish former professional footballer who played as a defender.

== Career ==
In February 2011, he joined Zagłębie Sosnowiec on a one-and-a-half-year contract. He signed for the newly reformed Polonia Bytom in August 2017.

== Honours ==
Polonia Bytom

- IV liga Silesia II: 2017–18
