= Michał Wróbel =

Polish footballer and coach

Personal information
- Date of birth: 27 April 1980 (age 46)
- Place of birth: Gliwice, Poland
- Height: 2.01 m (6 ft 7 in)
- Position: Goalkeeper

Youth career
- Górnik Zabrze
- Sośnica Gliwice

Senior career*
Years	Team	Apps	(Gls)
1998–2003	Górnik Zabrze	7	(0)
2000	→ Włókniarz Kietrz (loan)		
2002	→ Szczakowianka (loan)		
2003–2006	Wisła Kraków	0	(0)
2003–2006	Wisła Kraków II		
2007–2009	Unia Janikowo	76	(0)
2009–2010	KSZO Ostrowiec	37	(0)
2011–2016	Olimpia Grudziądz	104	(2)
2016–2018	Rodło Kwidzyn		

Managerial career
- 2018–2019: Olimpia Grudziądz (goalkeeper coach)
- * Club domestic league appearances and goals

Michał Wróbel (born 27 April 1980) is a Polish former professional footballer who played as a goalkeeper. Following retirement, he became a goalkeeping coach.

== Career ==
=== Club ===
In February 2011, he joined Olimpia Grudziądz on a one-and-a-half-year contract.

During the 2012–13 season, Wróbel scored last-minute equalizers in two 1–1 away draws, against GKS Katowice on 3 November 2012 and Termalica Bruk-Bet Nieciecza on 1 June 2013.

== Coaching career ==
In January 2018, Wróbel was hired as a goalkeeper coach by his former club Olimpia Grudziądz. He left the position in August 2019.

== Honours ==
Olimpia Grudziądz

- II liga West: 2010–11
