= Paweł Leśniak =

Polish footballer

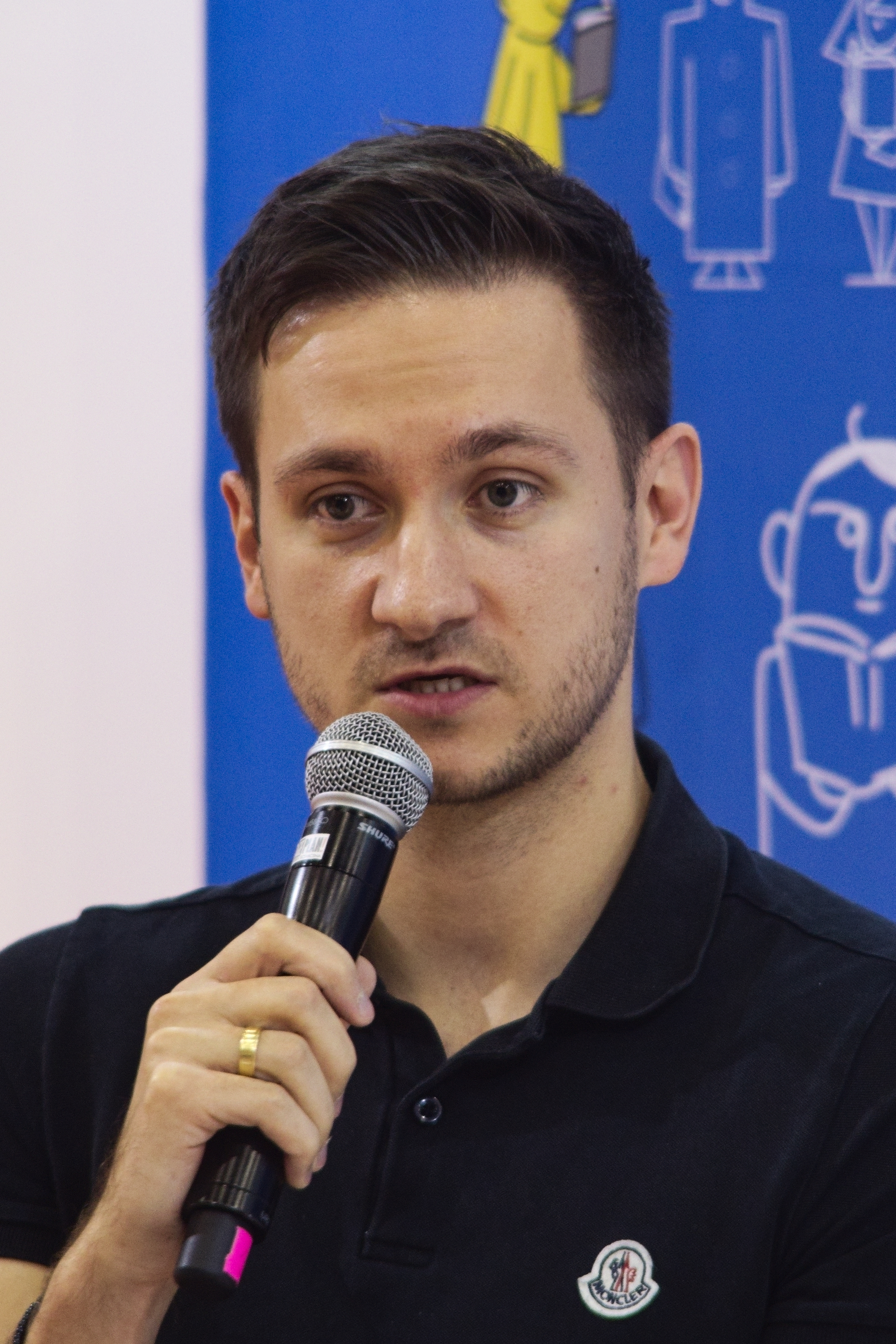

Personal information
- Date of birth: 22 February 1989 (age 37)
- Place of birth: Nowy Sącz, Poland
- Height: 1.81 m (5 ft 11 in)
- Position: Midfielder

Youth career
- Sandecja Nowy Sącz

Senior career*
Years	Team	Apps	(Gls)
2008	Kolejarz Stróże	7	(0)
2008–2009	Sandecja Nowy Sącz	2	(0)
2009–2010	Kolejarz Stróże	22	(0)
2010–2013	Sandecja Nowy Sącz	24	(0)
2013–2014	Kolejarz Stróże	5	(0)
2014	Tatran Liptovský Mikuláš		
- * Club domestic league appearances and goals

Paweł Leśniak (born 22 February 1989) is a Polish former professional footballer who played as a midfielder.

== Career ==
Before the second half of the 2007–08 season, Leśniak signed for Polish third tier side Kolejarz Stróże. In 2010, he moved to I liga club Sandecja Nowy Sącz, where he made 24 appearances and scored 0 goals. On 29 August 2010, Leśniak made his debut for Sandecja in a 2–1 win over Kolejarz Stróże. In 2014, he signed for Slovak club Tatran Liptovský Mikuláš but left due to not being registered within the deadline. At the age of 26, he retired from professional football to become an author.
