= Szymon Skrzypczak =

Polish footballer (born 1990)

Personal information
- Full name: Szymon Skrzypczak
- Date of birth: 14 March 1990 (age 36)
- Place of birth: Rawicz, Poland
- Height: 1.83 m (6 ft 0 in)
- Position: Centre forward

Team information
- Current team: Górnik Polkowice
- Number: 23

Youth career
- –2007: Polonia Leszno
- 2007–2011: Zagłębie Lubin

Senior career*
Years	Team	Apps	(Gls)
2007–2009	Zagłębie Lubin II		
2011–2012	Ruch Radzionków	16	(2)
2012	MKS Kluczbork	11	(1)
2012–2013	KS Polkowice	32	(21)
2013–2017	Górnik Zabrze	54	(5)
2014	→ GKS Katowice (loan)	5	(0)
2017–2020	Odra Opole	96	(30)
2020–2023	Chojniczanka Chojnice	98	(34)
2023–2025	Miedź Legnica II	67	(63)
2025–	Górnik Polkowice	34	(10)
- * Club domestic league appearances and goals as of 18:11, 9 June 2026 (UTC)

Szymon Skrzypczak (born 14 March 1990) is a Polish professional footballer who plays as a centre forward for III liga club Górnik Polkowice.

== Club career ==
In 2017, he moved to Odra Opole.

On 18 August 2020, he signed a two-year contract with Chojniczanka Chojnice.

== Honours ==
Miedź Legnica II

- IV liga Lower Silesia: 2023–24
- Polish Cup (Lower Silesia regionals): 2024–25
- Polish Cup (Legnica regionals): 2024–25
- Lower Silesia Super Cup: 2024

Górnik Polkowice

- Polish Cup (Lower Silesia regionals): 2025–26
- Polish Cup (Legnica regionals): 2025–26

Individual

- II liga West top scorer: 2012–13
