= Witold Cichy =

Polish footballer

Personal information
- Date of birth: 15 March 1986 (age 40)
- Place of birth: Wodzisław Śląski, Poland
- Height: 1.82 m (6 ft 0 in)
- Position: Defender

Senior career*
| Years | Team | Apps | (Gls) |
| 2003–2008 | Odra Wodzisław | 34 | (0) |
| 2009 | GKS Jastrzębie-Zdrój | 15 | (0) |
| 2009–2014 | Kolejarz Stróże | 139 | (7) |
| 2014–2015 | Puszcza Niepołomice | 31 | (0) |
| 2015–2016 | Kotwica Kołobrzeg | 29 | (0) |
| 2016–2017 | ROW 1964 Rybnik | 15 | (1) |
| 2017–2018 | MKS Trzebinia | 17 | (0) |
| Total | | 280 | (8) |

International career
| 2007–2008 | Poland U21 | 5 | (0) |
- * Club domestic league appearances and goals

Witold Cichy (born 15 March 1986) is a Polish former professional footballer who played as a defender.
