= Marcin Nowak (footballer) =

Polish footballer

Personal information
- Full name: Marcin Dariusz Nowak
- Date of birth: 26 June 1979 (age 47)
- Place of birth: Tomaszów Mazowiecki, Poland
- Height: 1.83 m (6 ft 0 in)
- Position: Defender

Senior career*
Years	Team	Apps	(Gls)
- Pilica Tomaszów Mazowiecki
1995	Gwarek Zabrze		
1996–2004	RKS Radomsko		
2004–2005	Volyn Lutsk	14	(0)
2005–2007	Widzew Łódź	42	(1)
2007–2008	Piast Gliwice	30	(3)
2008–2011	Pogoń Szczecin	56	(4)
2011–2012	KS Polkowice	29	(2)
2012–2013	Pogoń Siedlce	32	(1)
2013–2014	Warta Sieradz	35	(2)
2014–2016	Pelikan Łowicz	59	(4)
2017	Widzew Łódź	10	(1)
- * Club domestic league appearances and goals

Marcin Dariusz Nowak (born 26 June 1979) is a Polish former professional footballer who played as a defender.

== Honours ==
Widzew Łódź

- II liga: 2005–06
