= Grzegorz Tomala =

Polish footballer

Personal information
- Full name: Grzegorz Tomala
- Date of birth: 6 September 1974 (age 52)
- Place of birth: Gliwice, Poland
- Height: 1.96 m (6 ft 5 in)
- Position: Goalkeeper

Senior career*
Years	Team	Apps	(Gls)
1992–1993	Odra Wodzisław Śląski		
1993	KS 27 Gołkowice		
1994–1998	Górnik Pszów		
1998–2003	Odra Wodzisław Śląski	70	(0)
2003–2005	Kolejarz Stróże		
2005–2007	Przyszłość Rogów		
2007	Granica Ruptawa		
2008	GKS Jastrzębie	2	(0)
2009–2014	Przyszłość Rogów		
2015	Wypoczynek Buków		

International career
1999	Poland	1	(0)
- * Club domestic league appearances and goals

Grzegorz Tomala (born 6 September 1974) is a Polish former professional footballer who played as a goalkeeper. He made one appearance for the Poland national team in 1999. Following retirement, he became a goalkeeping coach.
