= Tomasz Salamoński =

Polish footballer

Personal information
- Full name: Tomasz Salamoński
- Date of birth: 10 October 1973 (age 53)
- Place of birth: Wąsosz, Poland
- Height: 1.78 m (5 ft 10 in)
- Position: Midfielder

Senior career*
Years	Team	Apps	(Gls)
–1997	Orla Wąsosz		
1998–2003	Górnik Polkowice		
2003–2005	Zagłębie Lubin	33	(3)
2006	Zagłębie Lubin II		
2006–2012	KS Polkowice	143	(14)
- * Club domestic league appearances and goals

Tomasz Salamoński (born 10 October 1973) is a Polish former professional footballer who played as a midfielder.

== Honours ==
Górnik Polkowice

- III liga Lower Silesia–Lubusz: 2008–09
