= Wojciech Kaczmarek =

Polish footballer

Personal information
- Full name: Wojciech Kaczmarek
- Date of birth: 29 March 1983 (age 43)
- Place of birth: Gostyń, Poland
- Height: 2.02 m (6 ft 8 in)
- Position: Goalkeeper

Youth career
- Kania Gostyń

Senior career*
Years	Team	Apps	(Gls)
2000–2001	Wisła Kraków II		
2004–2006	Kania Gostyń		
2006–2010	Śląsk Wrocław	49	(0)
2011–2012	Cracovia	41	(0)
2012–2015	Zawisza Bydgoszcz	57	(0)
2015–2016	Podbeskidzie Bielsko-Biała	4	(0)
2016–2017	MKS Kluczbork	8	(0)
2017–2019	Carina Gubin	71	(0)
- * Club domestic league appearances and goals

Wojciech Kaczmarek (born 29 March 1983) is a Polish former professional footballer who played as a goalkeeper.

In March 2011, Kaczmarek was called up to the Poland national team for games against Lithuania and Greece, but did not appear in any of these games.

== Honours ==
Śląsk Wrocław

- Ekstraklasa Cup: 2008–09

Zawisza Bydgoszcz

- I liga: 2012–13
- Polish Cup: 2013–14

Carina Gubin

- Regional league Zielona Góra: 2017–18
