= Tomasz Chałas =

Polish footballer (born 1988)

Personal information
- Full name: Tomasz Chałas
- Date of birth: 20 July 1988 (age 38)
- Place of birth: Pruszków, Poland
- Height: 1.85 m (6 ft 1 in)
- Position: Striker

Youth career
- –2008: Znicz Pruszków
- 2008: Legia Warsaw

Senior career*
Years	Team	Apps	(Gls)
2009–2010	Znicz Pruszków		
2010–2013	Górnik Zabrze	4	(0)
2011	→ Dolcan Ząbki (loan)	7	(0)
2011	→ Zawisza Bydgoszcz (loan)	4	(0)
2012	→ Olimpia Elbląg (loan)	13	(9)
2012	→ Zawisza Bydgoszcz (loan)	13	(2)
2013–2014	Pogoń Szczecin	14	(2)
2014	Kolejarz Stróże	13	(2)
2014–2015	Dolcan Ząbki	14	(3)
2015–2016	Stomil Olsztyn	9	(0)
2016	Znicz Pruszków	13	(6)
2016–2017	Ursus Warsaw	9	(6)
2017	MKS Kluczbork	4	(0)
2017–2018	Polonia Warsaw	32	(8)
2018–2019	Znicz Pruszków	4	(0)
2019–2020	KSZO Ostrowiec	18	(4)
2021	Grom Warsaw	2	(0)
2023–2024	AP FFK Warsaw	2	(0)

International career
2009–2010	Poland U21	3	(0)
- * Club domestic league appearances and goals

Tomasz Chałas (born 20 July 1988) is a Polish former professional footballer who played as a forward.

== Club career ==
As a youth, he trained at his hometown club Znicz Pruszków, with a brief spell at Agrykola Warszawa. In the fall of 2008 he joined Legia Warsaw's youth team playing in the Młoda Ekstraklasa. The contract was terminated by mutual agreement during the winter transfer window. He then signed a two-year deal with I liga side Znicz Pruszków. In July 2010, he joined Górnik Zabrze in the Ekstraklasa.

In February 2011, he was loaned to Dolcan Ząbki on a half-year deal. He returned to Górnik half a year later.

== International career ==
He was a part of Poland national under-21 football team.
