= Wojciech Kędziora =

Polish footballer

Personal information
- Full name: Wojciech Kędziora
- Date of birth: 20 December 1980 (age 45)
- Place of birth: Gliwice, Poland
- Height: 1.87 m (6 ft 1 1/2 in)
- Position: Forward

Team information
- Current team: Piast Gliwice II (assistant)

Senior career*
Years	Team	Apps	(Gls)
1999–2001	Sośnica Gliwice		
2001–2004	Carbo Gliwice		
2004–2008	Piast Gliwice	129	(18)
2008–2011	Zagłębie Lubin	45	(10)
2011–2015	Piast Gliwice	70	(28)
2015–2017	Termalica Nieciecza	60	(13)
2017–2018	GKS Katowice	27	(10)
2018–2019	Ruch Chorzów	28	(3)
2019–2020	Wilki Wilcza	4	(0)
2020–2025	Piast Gliwice II	88	(43)
- * Club domestic league appearances and goals

Wojciech Kędziora (born 20 December 1980) is a Polish former professional footballer who played as a forward. He is currently the assistant coach of Piast Gliwice II.

== Career ==
At the beginning of his career, Kędziora played for Sośnica Gliwice. In 2001, he moved to the Carbo Gliwice. Then he played four seasons in Piast Gliwice.

In June 2008, he joined Zagłębie Lubin. He was released from Zagłębie Lubin on 1 June 2011.

In July 2011, he joined Piast Gliwice.

On 30 July 2019, Kędziora signed with Wilki Wilcza.

== Honours ==
Piast Gliwice

- I liga: 2011–12

Piast Gliwice II

- Regional league Silesia I: 2020–21

Individual

- I liga top scorer: 2011–12
