= Marcin Pietroń =

Polish footballer (born 1986)

Personal information
- Date of birth: 24 January 1986 (age 40)
- Place of birth: Zielona Góra, Poland
- Height: 1.75 m (5 ft 9 in)
- Position: Left winger

Team information
- Current team: SPKL Stag

Youth career
- UKP Zielona Góra

Senior career*
Years	Team	Apps	(Gls)
2003–2008	Zagłębie Lubin	24	(4)
2008–2009	Arka Gdynia	22	(2)
2009–2012	Piast Gliwice	36	(3)
2012–2013	GKS Katowice	19	(0)
2013–2019	Fram Larvik	127	(16)
2020–	SPKL Stag		

International career
2007	Poland U21	3	(0)
- * Club domestic league appearances and goals as of 00:25, 30 January 2024 (UTC)

Marcin Pietroń (born 24 January 1986 in Zielona Góra) is a Polish professional footballer who plays as a midfielder for Norwegian club SPKL Stag.

== Career ==
Pietroń was a member of the Zagłębie Lubin side which won the 2006–07 Ekstraklasa, scoring four goals in eleven reserve appearances in the league. He didn't live up to his early potential and spent the end of his career in the lower levels of Norwegian football.

== Honours ==
Zagłębie Lubin

- Ekstraklasa: 2006–07
- Polish Super Cup: 2007
