= Bartłomiej Dudzic =

Polish footballer

Personal information
- Full name: Bartłomiej Dudzic
- Date of birth: 18 August 1988 (age 38)
- Place of birth: Oświęcim, Poland
- Height: 1.80 m (5 ft 11 in)
- Position: Forward

Team information
- Current team: Niwa Nowa Wieś
- Number: 13

Youth career
- Niwa Nowa Wieś

Senior career*
Years	Team	Apps	(Gls)
2004–2006	Unia Oświęcim		
2007–2014	Cracovia	142	(17)
2010	→ GKS Katowice (loan)	15	(1)
2015–2020	Sandecja Nowy Sącz	123	(13)
2021	Hejnał Kęty	9	(5)
2021–	Niwa Nowa Wieś		
- * Club domestic league appearances and goals as of 18 August 2024

Bartłomiej Dudzic (born 18 August 1988) is a Polish footballer who plays as a forward for Niwa Nowa Wieś.

== Honours ==
Sandecja Nowy Sącz

- I liga: 2016–17

Niwa Nowa Wieś

- V liga Lesser Poland West: 2022–23
