= Michał Renusz =

Polish footballer

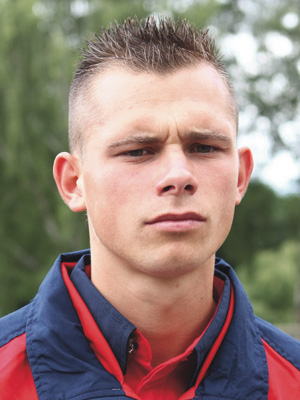

Personal information
- Full name: Michał Renusz
- Date of birth: 18 October 1987 (age 39)
- Place of birth: Malbork, Poland
- Height: 1.74 m (5 ft 9 in)
- Position: Midfielder

Team information
- Current team: Salos Rumia
- Number: 17

Youth career
- MKS Władysławowo
- 2004–2005: Arka Gdynia

Senior career*
Years	Team	Apps	(Gls)
2005–2006	Arka Gdynia II		
2006–2007	Orlęta Reda		
2007	Orkan Rumia		
2008–2010	Jagiellonia Białystok	18	(0)
2009	→ Supraślanka Supraśl (loan)		
2010–2011	Stomil Olsztyn	25	(1)
2011–2013	Górnik Łęczna	50	(4)
2013–2014	GKS Bełchatów	28	(1)
2015	Arka Gdynia	24	(1)
2016	Wierzyca Pelplin		
2016–2017	Centrum Pelplin		
2017–2018	Orkan Rumia	51	(13)
2019	Anioły Garczegorze	5	(1)
2019–2020	Bałtyk Gdynia	16	(0)
2020–2021	Gryf Wejherowo	15	(2)
2021–2023	Zatoka Puck	4	(0)
2024	Orlęta Reda	4	(0)
2024–	Salos Rumia		
- * Club domestic league appearances and goals as of 18 October 2024

Michał Renusz (born 18 October 1987) is a Polish footballer who plays as a midfielder for Salos Rumia.

== Career ==
=== Club ===
In March 2009, following extended health problems, Jagiellonia loaned him out to Supraślanka Supraśl in order to regain fitness.

In July 2011, he joined Górnik Łęczna.

== Honours ==
GKS Bełchatów

- I liga: 2013–14
