= Ivan Udarević =

Croatian footballer

Personal information
- Date of birth: 18 November 1982 (age 43)
- Place of birth: Osijek, Croatia
- Height: 1.89 m (6 ft 2 in)
- Position: Defender

Senior career*
Years	Team	Apps	(Gls)
2003–2004	Belišće	20	(4)
2004–2005	Polonia Warszawa	21	(2)
2005	Inter Zaprešić	5	(0)
2006	APOEL	3	(1)
2006–2007	Polonia Warszawa	28	(1)
2007–2008	ŁKS Łódź	1	(0)
2008–2010	Ilanka Rzepin	49	(14)
2010–2013	Flota Świnoujście	76	(1)
2013	Motor Lublin	11	(0)
2013–2014	Odra Opole	23	(1)
2014–2016	Swornica Czarnowąsy		

International career
2001	Croatia U19	1	(0)
- * Club domestic league appearances and goals

Ivan Udarević (born 18 November 1982) is a Croatian former professional footballer who played as a defender.

== Career ==
Udarević previously played for NK Inter Zaprešić in the Croatian First League.

== Honours ==
APOEL

- Cypriot Cup: 2005–06
