= Janusz Tadeusz Cieśliński =

- Born: 15 April 1954 (age 72); Słupsk, Poland
- Citizenship: Polish
- Education: Gdańsk University of Technology
- Awards: Ribbon
- Scientific career
- Fields: intensification of convective heat transfer, the dynamics of bubbles of steam and gas, renewable energy, unconventional methods and systems for energy conversion

Janusz Tadeusz Cieśliński was born on April 15, 1954, in Słupsk, Poland. Polish full professor of Gdańsk University of Technology, research fields Mechanical Engineering, Thermodynamics. Vice-Rector for Organisation of Gdańsk University of Technology since 1 September 2016.

== Education ==
Janusz Cieśliński graduated from the Faculty of Mechanical Engineering at Gdańsk University of Technology (1978). In 1986 he received the title of Doctor, in 1997 he obtained the title of Ph.D. with habilitation, and in 2006 he received the title of Professor. He worked as head of department and vice-dean for Education at the Faculty of Mechanical Engineering for two terms (2002-2008).

== Research interests ==
His research interests relate, among others, to intensification of convective heat transfer, the dynamics of bubbles of steam and gas, renewable energy, unconventional methods and systems for energy conversion, for example MHD generators, fuel cells and Stirling engines. Moreover, he studies thermophysical properties and using nanofluids in energy systems, including storage of thermal energy.

== Publications ==
Author and co-author of 152 papers. He supervised 9 Ph.Ds, and is a tutor of 3 doctoral students. He has been a reviewer in 24 doctoral, and 6 habilitation proceedings and in 2 procedure for the title of professor.

Janusz Cieśliński has completed a number of scientific internships, for example at Universität-GH-Essen, in Kernforschungsanlage Jülich GmbH and twice in Fachhochschule Stralsund (University of Applied Sciences) as a DAAD scholarship. He repeatedly held short-term internships at the Hochschule Bremen. He is an active participant in the Erasmus Programme. The supervisor of more than 30 theses carried out at German universities.

== Membership of societies ==
Since 1994 a member of the Section of Thermodynamics of the Committee of Thermodynamics and Combustion of the Polish Academy of Sciences (secretary of the Section in 1999–2002). Since 2011 a member of the Committee of Thermodynamics and Combustion of the Polish Academy of Sciences. 1994-2011 chairman of the interdisciplinary Subsection of Multiphase Flows Section of Fluid Mechanics of the Committee of Mechanics of the Polish Academy of Sciences. Chairman, secretary or member of more than 30 organizing committees of conferences at national and international levels. Since 2014 a member of the editorial board of The Archive of Mechanical Engineering, since 1993 scientific consultant of the Magazine on Refrigeration and Air Conditioning.

== Awards ==
He was awarded the Gold Cross of Merit, the Medal of the National Education Commission, and also the Medal "Rebels at Gdańsk University of Technology 1945-1989". His activities for Gdańsk University of Technology were awarded 37 prizes of the GUT Rector.
