= Grzegorz Fonfara =

Polish footballer

Personal information
- Full name: Grzegorz Fonfara
- Date of birth: 8 June 1983 (age 43)
- Place of birth: Katowice, Poland
- Height: 1.76 m (5 ft 9 1/2 in)
- Position: Defender

Youth career
- GKS Katowice

Senior career*
Years	Team	Apps	(Gls)
2002–2004	GKS Katowice	65	(2)
2005–2012	GKS Bełchatów	114	(2)
2012–2014	GKS Katowice	56	(9)
2014–2015	ROW 1964 Rybnik	18	(4)
2015–2016	Zagłębie Sosnowiec	32	(5)
2016–2017	Stal Mielec	7	(0)
2017	Rozwój Katowice	12	(2)
2017–2019	Gwarek Tarnowskie Góry	35	(4)
2019–2020	Szczakowianka Jaworzno	16	(6)
2020–2022	Górnik Mysłowice	29	(3)
Total		384	(37)

International career
2005	Poland U21	5	(0)
- * Club domestic league appearances and goals

Grzegorz Fonfara (born 8 June 1983) is a Polish former professional footballer who played as a defender.

== National team ==
He is a former member of U-21 Poland national football team.

== Honours ==
Szczakowianka Jaworzno

- Regional league Silesia IV: 2019–20
