= Sebastian Zalepa =

Polish footballer

Personal information
- Full name: Sebastian Zalepa
- Date of birth: 7 February 1990 (age 36)
- Place of birth: Łódź, Poland
- Height: 1.94 m (6 ft 4 in)
- Position: Centre-back

Youth career
- ChKS Łódź
- 2004–2007: UKS SMS Łódź

Senior career*
Years	Team	Apps	(Gls)
2007–2012	UKS SMS Łódź	54	(4)
2011	→ Widzew Łódź (loan)	2	(0)
2011	→ Tur Turek (loan)	17	(2)
2012–2014	Flota Świnoujście	77	(9)
2015	Olimpia Grudziądz	4	(0)
2015–2017	Stal Mielec	57	(6)
2017–2018	Stal Stalowa Wola	16	(3)
2018–2019	Resovia	27	(3)
2019	Wigry Suwałki	0	(0)
2019–2021	Resovia	46	(5)
2021	GKS Bełchatów	8	(0)
2022	Hutnik Kraków	4	(0)
2022–2024	Orkan Buczek	54	(8)

International career
	Poland U17	1	(1)
2011	Poland U21	1	(0)
- * Club domestic league appearances and goals as of 16:52, 21 December 2024 (UTC)

Sebastian Zalepa (born 7 February 1990) is a Polish professional footballer who plays as a centre-back.

== Club career ==
He made his Ekstraklasa debut on 15 May 2011.

In July 2011, he was loaned to Tur Turek.

== International career ==
He was a part of Poland national under-21 football team.

== Honours ==
Stal Mielec

- II liga: 2015–16
