= Łukasz Tymiński =

Polish footballer

Personal information
- Full name: Łukasz Tymiński
- Date of birth: 8 November 1990 (age 35)
- Place of birth: Żywiec, Poland
- Height: 1.73 m (5 ft 8 in)
- Position: Midfielder

Youth career
- ŻAPN Żywiec

Senior career*
| Years | Team | Apps | (Gls) |
| 2006 | Czarni-Góral Żywiec | | |
| 2007 | Skałka Żabnica | | |
| 2007 | Czarni-Góral Żywiec | | |
| 2008–2010 | Śląsk Wrocław | 1 | (0) |
| 2008–2010 | Śląsk Wrocław (ME) | 32 | (2) |
| 2010 | → Polonia Bytom (loan) | 10 | (0) |
| 2011 | Polonia Bytom | 13 | (1) |
| 2011–2015 | Jagiellonia Białystok | 48 | (2) |
| 2013 | → Ruch Chorzów (loan) | 12 | (0) |
| 2013 | → Ruch Chorzów II (loan) | 7 | (0) |
| 2014 | → Okocimski KS Brzesko (loan) | 13 | (0) |
| 2014–2015 | Jagiellonia Białystok II | 10 | (4) |
| 2015–2018 | Górnik Łęczna | 60 | (2) |

International career
| 2011 | Poland U20 | 2 | (0) |
| 2011–2012 | Poland U21 | 5 | (0) |
- * Club domestic league appearances and goals

Łukasz Tymiński (born 8 November 1990) is a Polish former professional footballer who played as a midfielder.

== Club career ==
In March 2010, he was loaned to Polonia Bytom on a one-year deal from Śląsk Wrocław. In January 2011, he was sold to Polonia.

In July 2011, he joined Jagiellonia Białystok on a four-year contract.

== Honours ==
Śląsk Wrocław

- Ekstraklasa Cup: 2008–09
