= Wojciech Wilczyński =

Polish footballer

Personal information
- Date of birth: 18 March 1990 (age 36)
- Place of birth: Słupsk, Poland
- Height: 1.75 m (5 ft 9 in)
- Position: Defender

Team information
- Current team: Wikęd Luzino (sporting director)

Youth career
- Orliki Jezierzyce
- Stal Jezierzyce
- 2002: Sezamor Słupsk
- 2003: Gryf 95 Słupsk
- 2004–2009: Arka Gdynia

Senior career*
Years	Team	Apps	(Gls)
2009–2013	Arka Gdynia	39	(3)
2012	→ Polonia Bytom (loan)	13	(0)
2012–2013	→ Sandecja Nowy Sącz (loan)	13	(0)
2013	Warta Poznań	14	(0)
2013–2019	Bytovia Bytów	138	(1)
2019–2021	Radunia Stężyca	36	(0)
2021–2022	GKS Przodkowo	25	(0)
2022–2025	Wikęd Luzino	87	(7)
Total		11	(365)

International career
2010	Poland U20	3	(0)
- * Club domestic league appearances and goals

Wojciech Wilczyński (born 18 March 1990) is a Polish former professional footballer who played as a defender. He is currently the sporting director of III liga club Wikęd Luzino.

== Honours ==
Radunia Stężyca

- III liga, group II: 2020–21

Wikęd Luzino

- IV liga Pomerania: 2022–23, 2024–25
