= Piotr Misztal (footballer) =

Polish footballer

Personal information
- Date of birth: 10 July 1987 (age 39)
- Place of birth: Warsaw, Poland
- Height: 1.93 m (6 ft 4 in)
- Position: Goalkeeper

Youth career
- –2005: Olimpia Warsaw
- 2006: Korona Kielce

Senior career*
Years	Team	Apps	(Gls)
2006–2011	Korona Kielce	2	(0)
2009–2010	→ Naprzód Jędrzejów (loan)	23	(0)
2010–2011	→ GLKS Nadarzyn (loan)	24	(0)
2011–2012	Znicz Pruszków	30	(0)
2012–2015	GKS Tychy	62	(0)
2015	Nadwiślan Góra	9	(0)
2015–2026	Znicz Pruszków	260	(0)
- * Club domestic league appearances and goals as of 16:18, 26 May 2026 (UTC)

Piotr Misztal (born 10 July 1987) is a Polish professional footballer who plays as a goalkeeper.
