= Janusz Kudyba =

Polish footballer

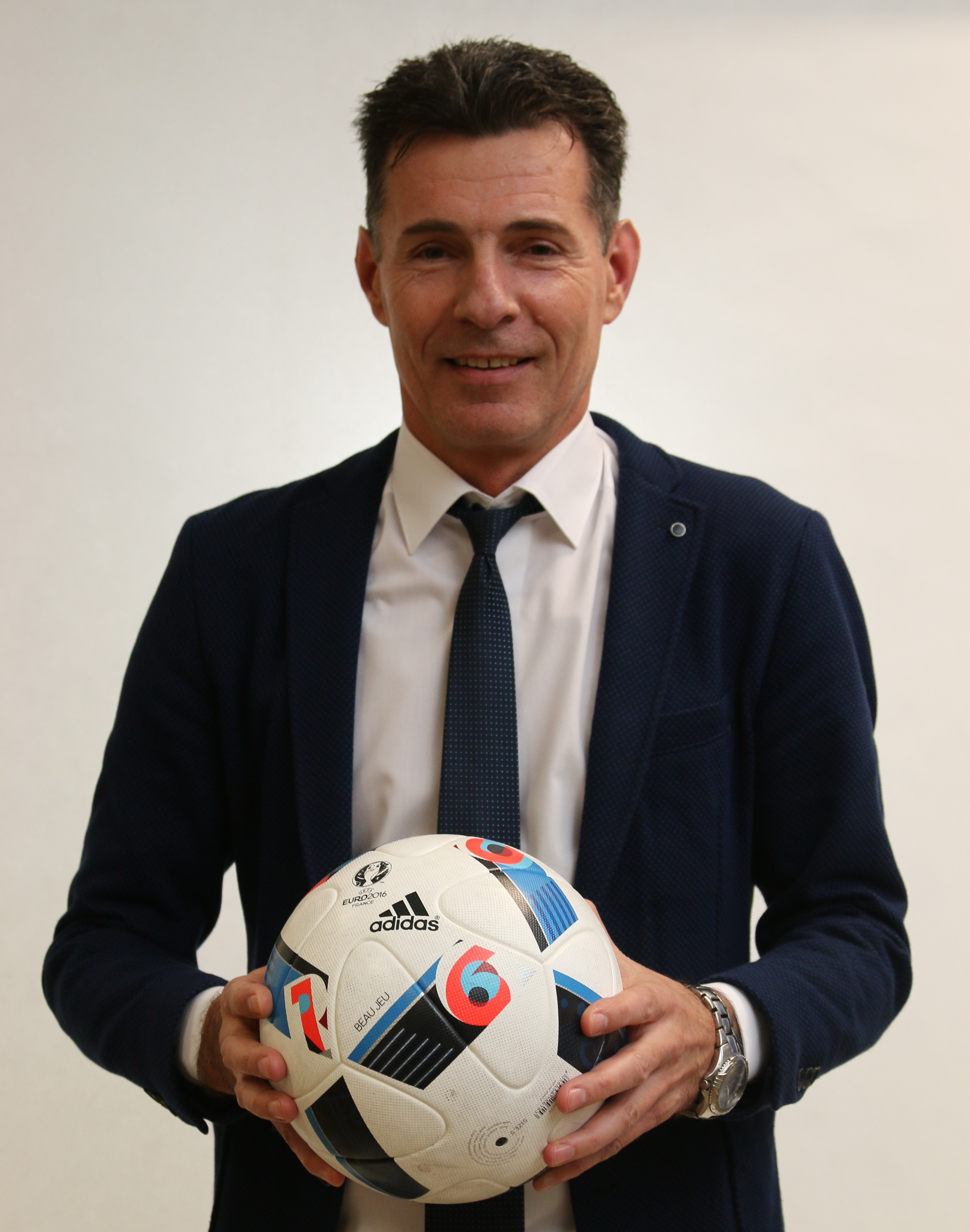

Personal information
- Date of birth: July 12, 1961 (age 65)
- Place of birth: Jelenia Góra, Poland
- Height: 1.86 m (6 ft 1 in)
- Position: Striker

Senior career*
Years	Team	Apps	(Gls)
1979–1980	Karkonosze Jelenia Góra		
1980–1981	Lech Poznań	0	(0)
1981–1982	Lechia Piechowice		
1982–1988	Motor Lublin		
1988–1990	Zagłębie Lubin		
1990	Karlskrona		
1990–1991	Zagłębie Lubin	21	(8)
1991	Lyn	20	(0)
1991–1992	Zagłębie Lubin	20	(6)
1992–1993	GKS Bełchatów		
1993–1996	Śląsk Wrocław		

Managerial career
- 1996–1999: SMS Sport Contact Wrocław
- 1996–1999: Ravia Rawicz
- 2001: Czarni Żagań
- 2003: Pogoń Świebodzin
- 2003–2004: Orzeł Ząbkowice Śląskie
- 2005: GKS Kobierzyce
- 2006–2008: Gawin Królewska Wola
- 2008: Gawin/Ślęza Wrocław
- 2008–2009: Zagłębie Sosnowiec
- 2009–2011: Miedź Legnica
- 2011: Czarni Żagań
- 2011–2012: KS Polkowice
- 2013–2014: Miedź Legnica (head of youth)
- 2014: Miedź Legnica (caretaker)
- 2014–2015: Miedź Legnica
- 2015–2016: Miedź Legnica (head of youth)
- 2022–2023: Barycz Sułów
- * Club domestic league appearances and goals

Janusz Kudyba (born 12 July 1961) is a Polish football executive and former professional player who played as a striker. He is currently a member of the board at Miedź Legnica in the economic sector.

He played in the top leagues of Poland and Norway, and most recently managed IV liga club Barycz Sułów.
