= Piotr Skiba =

Polish footballer (born 1982)

Personal information
- Date of birth: 7 July 1982 (age 44)
- Place of birth: Olsztyn, Poland
- Height: 1.85 m (6 ft 1 in)
- Position: Goalkeeper

Youth career
- Stomil Olsztyn

Senior career*
Years	Team	Apps	(Gls)
2001	Warfama Dobre Miasto		
2001	Gryf Wejherowo		
2002	Warfama Dobre Miasto		
2003–2006	OKS 1945 Olsztyn		
2006–2007	Bradford (Park Avenue)	33	(0)
2007–2008	Ossett Town	26	(0)
2008–2009	Guiseley	53	(0)
2009–2010	Farsley Celtic	21	(0)
2010	Huragan Morąg	16	(0)
2011–2020	Stomil Olsztyn	227	(0)
- * Club domestic league appearances and goals

Piotr Skiba (born 7 July 1982) is a Polish former professional footballer who played as a goalkeeper.

== Career ==
In 2006, Skiba signed for English non-league side Bradford (Park Avenue) after trialing for Leeds United in the English second division and playing for Polish fourth division club Stomil Olsztyn. After that, Skiba played for Ossett Town, Guiseley, and Farsley Celtic in the English non-league, where he threw the ball into his own goal during a 3–1 win over AFC Telford United.

In 2007, Skiba represented England C against Sheffield FC.

In 2010, he signed for Polish fourth division team Huragan Morąg.

Before the second half of the 2010–11 season, Skiba returned to Stomil Olsztyn in the Polish third division, where he rejected an offer from Polish top flight outfit Zagłębie Lubin.

In 2014, he established 4keepers, a goalkeeper glove shop.
