= Dawid Szufryn =

Polish footballer

Personal information
- Full name: Dawid Szufryn
- Date of birth: 29 May 1986 (age 40)
- Place of birth: Nowy Sącz, Poland
- Height: 1.91 m (6 ft 3 in)
- Position: Centre-back

Team information
- Current team: Poprad Muszyna
- Number: 5

Youth career
- Sandecja Nowy Sącz

Senior career*
Years	Team	Apps	(Gls)
2005–2009	Sandecja Nowy Sącz		
2009	Polonia Bytom	0	(0)
2009–2014	Kolejarz Stróże	109	(3)
2014–2024	Sandecja Nowy Sącz	194	(6)
2024–	Poprad Muszyna	29	(1)
- * Club domestic league appearances and goals as of 08:55, 19 June 2025 (UTC)

Dawid Szufryn (born 29 May 1986) is a Polish professional footballer who plays as a centre-back for IV liga Lesser Poland club Poprad Muszyna.

== Honours ==
Sandecja Nowy Sącz

- I liga: 2016–17
