= Elbląg Municipal Stadium =

Football stadium in Elbląg, Poland

Coordinates: 54°9′57″N 19°25′16″E

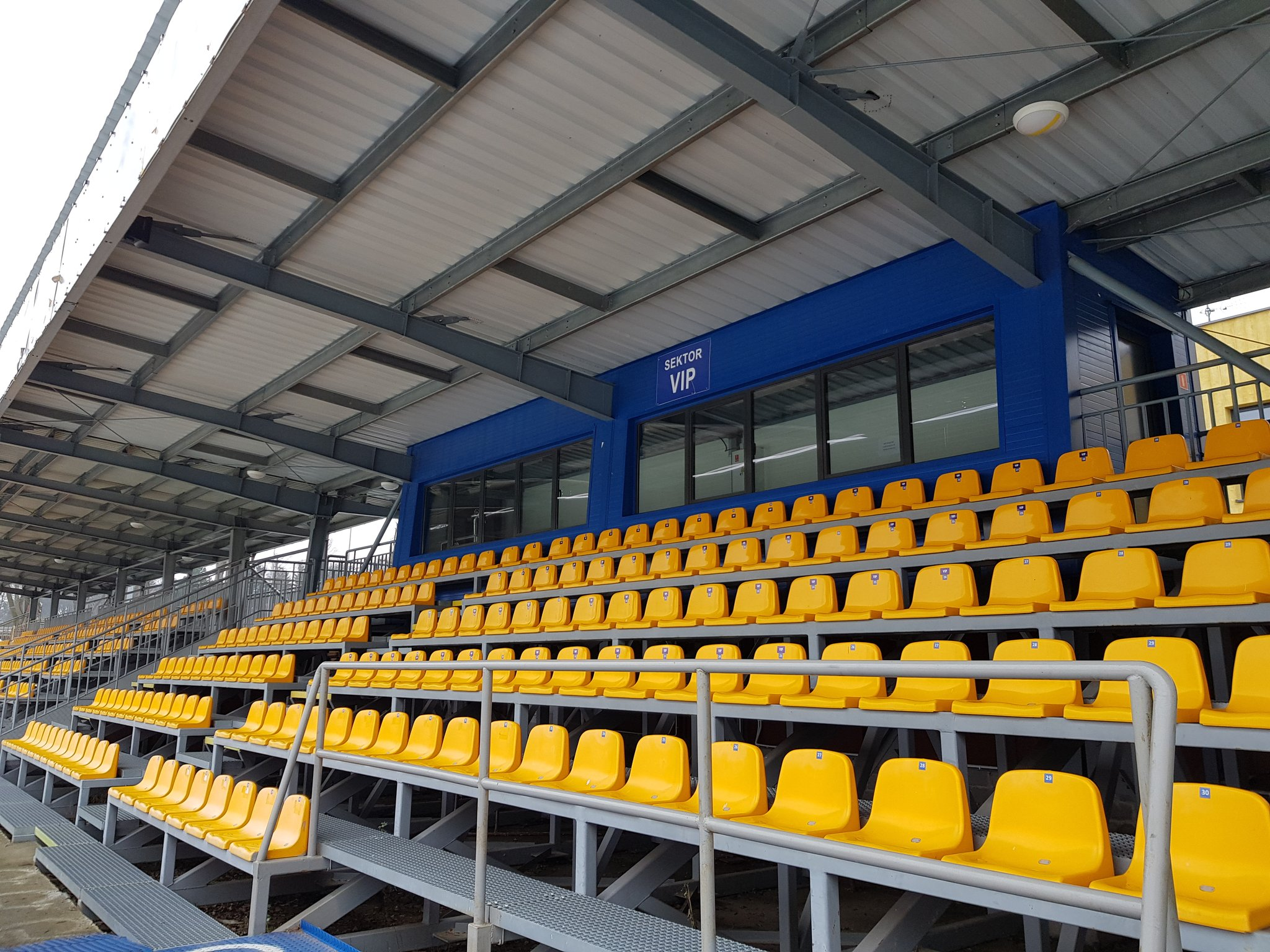
The covered stand of the municipal stadium in Elbląg

The Elbląg Municipal Stadium is a football stadium in Elbląg, Poland, used by the Olimpia Elbląg football club. Stadium capacity is 3,585, with 2,985 individual seats.
