= Dariusz Walęciak =

Polish footballer

Personal information
- Full name: Dariusz Walęciak
- Date of birth: 17 October 1979 (age 47)
- Place of birth: Piotrków Trybunalski, Poland
- Height: 1.83 m (6 ft 0 in)
- Position: Defender

Senior career*
Years	Team	Apps	(Gls)
1998–2002	GKS Bełchatów		
2003–2006	Heko Czermno		
2006–2014	Kolejarz Stróże	147+	(2+)
2014–2015	Warta Dziadoszyn		
- * Club domestic league appearances and goals

Dariusz Walęciak (born 17 October 1979) is a Polish former professional footballer who played as a defender.
