= Krzysztof Bodziony =

Polish footballer

Personal information
- Full name: Krzysztof Bodziony
- Date of birth: 9 July 1985 (age 41)
- Place of birth: Rybnik, Poland
- Height: 1.76 m (5 ft 9 in)
- Position: Midfielder

Team information
- Current team: Ruch Stanowice
- Number: 8

Youth career
- Pniówek Pawłowice
- 2003–2004: Gwarek Zabrze

Senior career*
Years	Team	Apps	(Gls)
2004	Pogoń Szczecin II		
2005	Podbeskidzie Bielsko-Biała		
2005–2007	Pniówek Pawłowice		
2008–2010	Zagłębie Sosnowiec	55	(1)
2010–2014	Flota Świnoujście	128	(20)
2014–2015	GKS Katowice	14	(0)
2015–2016	Pogoń Siedlce	20	(1)
2016–2017	Pelikan Łowicz	8	(0)
2017–2018	MKS Kluczbork	23	(1)
2018–2019	Pniówek Pawłowice	33	(4)
2019–2020	Cukrownik Chybie	3	(1)
2020	Pniówek Pawłowice	8	(1)
2021–2023	Drama Zbrosławice	71	(15)
2024–	Ruch Stanowice	41	(6)
- * Club domestic league appearances and goals as of 22:22, 24 June 2025 (UTC)

Krzysztof Bodziony (born 9 July 1985) is a Polish professional footballer who plays as a midfielder for regional league club Ruch Stanowice.

== Honours ==
Drama Zbrosławice

- Regional league Silesia I: 2021–22
