= Tomasz Magdziarz =

Polish footballer

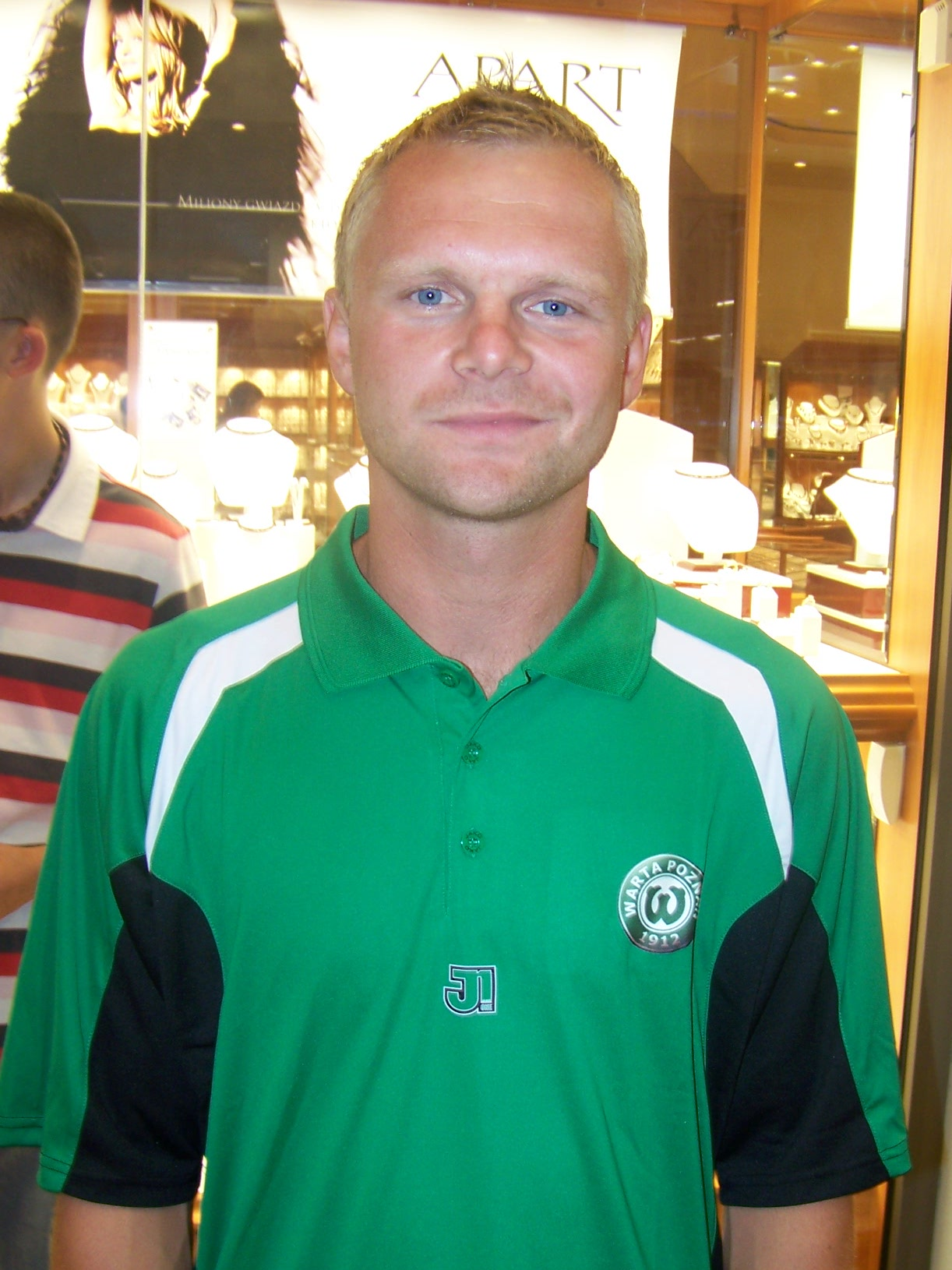

Personal information
- Date of birth: 23 February 1978 (age 48)
- Place of birth: Poznań, Poland
- Height: 1.80 m (5 ft 11 in)
- Position: Midfielder

Senior career*
Years	Team	Apps	(Gls)
1998–2004	Lech Poznań	2+	(0)
1998–1999	→ Warta Śrem (loan)		
2000	→ Warta Poznań (loan)		
2004–2013	Warta Poznań	168	(22)
- * Club domestic league appearances and goals

Tomasz Magdziarz (born 23 February 1978) is a Polish football agent and former professional footballer, co-owner of the sports agency Fabryka Futbolu.

Magdziarz started his football career at Lech Poznań. He spent the majority of his career at Warta Poznań. In 2012, he was selected by fans for Warta's team of the century as the only active player. In 2006 he was one of the co-founders, along with Szymon Pacanowski and Przemyslaw Erdman, of the sports agency Fabryka Futbolu.
