= Adam Cieśliński =

Polish footballer

Personal information
- Full name: Adam Cieśliński
- Date of birth: 11 May 1982 (age 44)
- Place of birth: Chełmno, Poland
- Height: 1.79 m (5 ft 10 1/2 in)
- Position: Forward

Team information
- Current team: Gwiazda Starogród
- Number: 10

Youth career
- FAM Chełmno

Senior career*
Years	Team	Apps	(Gls)
1998–2000	Kasztelan Papowo Biskupie		
2000–2004	Legia Warsaw II		
2000–2004	Legia Warsaw	0	(0)
2002–2003	→ Stomil Olsztyn (loan)	21	(9)
2005–2006	Toruński KP		
2007–2008	ŁKS Łódź	10	(0)
2008	Elana Toruń	12	(1)
2009–2010	KSZO Ostrowiec	38	(18)
2010–2012	Podbeskidzie Bielsko-Biała	39	(14)
2012–2016	Olimpia Grudziądz	106	(24)
2016	Wda Świecie	12	(4)
2016–2019	Gwiazda Starogród		(41)
2019–2020	Fala Świekatowo	2	(2)
2020	Gwiazda Starogród	10	(6)
2021	Chełminianka Chełmno	7	(1)
2021–	Gwiazda Starogród	27	(6)
- * Club domestic league appearances and goals as of 11 May 2024

Adam Cieśliński (born 11 May 1982 in Chełmno) is a Polish footballer who plays as a forward for Gwiazda Starogród.

== Honours ==
Legia Warsaw

- Polish League Cup: 2001–02

KSZO Ostrowiec

- II liga East: 2008–09

Individual

- I liga Player of the Year: 2010
