= Limanovia Limanowa =

Polish football club

- Full name: Miejski Klub Sportowy Limanovia Limanowa
- Founded: 1924; 102 years ago
- Ground: Roman Szumilas Stadium
- Capacity: 959
- Chairman: Janusz Bugajski
- Manager: Vacant
- League: IV liga Lesser Poland
- 2025–26: IV liga Lesser Poland, 10th of 19
- Website: http://www.limanovia.net/
Home colours	Away colours

MKS Limanovia Limanowa is a Polish football club from Limanowa, Lesser Poland. They currently compete in the IV liga Lesser Poland, the fifth level of Polish league system.

== History ==
=== Beginning ===
The club was founded in 1924 thanks to the merger of two local clubs, Sokół and Olimpia and adopted the name Klub Sportowy Olimpia w Limanowej (Sports Club Olimpia in Limanowa). The initial period of the club was very difficult, caused by a lack of funds. The first competitions were held in Limanowa, Nowy Sącz, Mszana Dolna, Wiśnicz, between all of the existing local sports clubs.

There were big difficulties with the organization of the competition, mainly related to the costs of travel, which team members were to be self-funded, unless the budget allowed the club to cover the travel expenses of the poorest players.

The main means of transport were mostly horse carts, and on rare occasions a truck, occasionally rental vehicles. Trainings and even competitions were initially held in the Station Square, and later at the local market next to the local stables belonging to Grzegorz Mars, to finally move to a pitch which exists to this day. The composition of that team were the following players: Marian Pawłowski (captain), Stanisław Krasuń, Sobiesław Miroszewski, Józef Bednarz, Jan Lesiecki, Tadeusz Kozdruń, Marian Kędroń, Aleksnder Samueli, Józef Śliwa, Stanisław Mamak, Jan Zaręba, Kazimierz Kępny, Kazimierz Węgrzynek.

The war and occupation of the country brutally interrupted the club's sporting activities. Sports, mainly football matches were held in secret from the occupier. In a match being played on 10 October 1943, Limanovia achieved great success by beating the famous Wisła Kraków 3–2. The Limanovia team had Stanislaw Baran in their squad, later a many-time representative of the Poland national team and ŁKS Łódź.

=== Post-war era ===
Shortly after the end of the occupation in Limanowa, in a private restaurant Teodor Smolawa held the first Sports Club Olimpia meeting in which it was decided to reactivate club football section, giving it a new name Klub Sportowy Limanovia (Sports Club Limanovia) and elected board of directors, which included: the club president Zbigniew Fleszar, then the county governor, Vice President Teodor Smolawa, Waleria Golińska the treasurer, secretary Marek Joniec and board member Józef Abram.

In 1947, elected a new board of the club, which repeatedly changed over the following years but president J. Puchała, vice-president Teodor Smolawa and secretary treasurer Tadeusz Golinski, treasurer Waleria Golińska and board member Joseph Abram all remained. "OMTUR" took patronage over the club. In 1948, the board changed once again and the function of chairman was taken over by Tomasz Pękala.

The most difficult period in the club's history were the years between 1949 and 1955. The club was plagued with various problems arising in part from the weak position of provincial sport and in part of the reorganization of all kinds that had a great influence on Polish sport in the 1950s. Football team was transferred to Klasa "B" group of Nowy Sącz, where they played matches until 1951. In the same year the merger with KS "Harnaś" Tymbark took place, but after a few months there merger fell apart.

On 5 March 1958, the general assembly elected a new board of the club headed by Roman Szumilas. Thanks to the dedicated work of the board the club was soon prepared for organizational and sporting successes; obtaining permission for the club to own land, which was allocated to football and for the first time in the history of the club, hired grade II football coach Jerzy Ligęza, who was also a physical education teacher in local schools allowing him to search for talented youth team.

=== Expansion of the club ===
In 1967, the club counted 518 members in four sections: football, athletics which was founded in 1966, cross-country and downhill skiing.

In April 1970, holiday and sports resort "KS Limanovia" was launched, which included a hotel building with 90 beds, and in 1974, a sports hall with an usable area of 13966m^{2}. In 1974, the sports hall, the largest in the Kraków area, celebrated the 50th anniversary KS "Limanovia" and marked the beginning of the celebration of "Earth Week Limanowa". During a ceremony held on 22 September 1974 years a banner funded by the city was given to the club and the club was awarded a gold badge for "Achievements given to the Cracovian lands".

In 1974–75, the team won promotion to the voivodeship-level league. The team coached by Richard Szumilas appeared as follows: Marek Czeczótka, Andrzej Ćwik, Tadeusz Rusin, Józef Binda, Jan Ślazyk, Roman Boroński, Zbigniew Donga, Stanisław Szubryt, Andrzej Pałka, Andrzej Zalewski, Janusz Biskup, Ryszard Kurczab, Mieczysław Wójtowicz, Władysław Binda.

The biggest success of the players was when KS Limanovia was promoted to the third division in 1984. Promotion was won by the following players: Andrzej Ćwik (captain), Wiesław Wójtowicz, Janusz Prędki, Józef Ficoń, Leszek Banaś, Jerzy Goliński, Wojciech Ślęzak, Andrzej Różkiewicz, Wojciech Majeran, Wojciech Gawron, Marek Wrona, Janusz Kurczab, Marek Szymański, Maciej Kaim, Tomasz Marcian, Bogdan Ryś. Trenerem zespołu był Tadeusz Wrona a kierownikami Grzegorz Młynarczyk i Paweł Jordan.

The football team fought valiantly in the Polish Cup. After winning the regional competition and moving on to the central level they beat Karpaty Krosno but lost against the higher division outfit Polonia Bytom. In the years 1988–1999 the level of play of Limanovia was varied, playing in the district and inter-district leagues. The football section was the leading section of the club and had about 120 active players.

Since 1979, the football section organizes the annual youth international football tournaments, the Society of Friends of the Earth Cup Limanowa. Since 1988, the tournament was not played due to financial difficulties. After a six-year break, restored the organization of the annual Junior Football Tournament for the Cup of the Mayor of Limanowa.

On 29 June to 2 July 1995 the Limanovia junior team participated in the tournament played in Terheijden where have achieved significant success taking place in the tournament after beating VCW Wagenberg 3–1 and the host team Terheijden 2–1. The success of the youth teams meant that the number of fans watching the senior side also rose, especially for important inter-regional games.

=== Recent Golden Era ===
Former club crest, which contained the club foundation date

Currently, the Municipal Sports Club "Limanovia" (change the name of the club was at the General Meeting, which was held in the Regional Museum in Limanowa on 20 December 1996), only football section exists. At present in this section there are six teams that are owned mostly by private sponsors and the City Council in Limanowa.

In 2010–11, the club achieved promotion to the fourth tier and won the regional Polish Cup. The following 2011–12 season, the club had a remarkable cup run causing many upsets, including beating Raków Częstochowa, Stilon Gorzów Wielkopolski and most surprisingly Ekstraklasa side Lechia Gdańsk, before eventually losing to Wisła Kraków in the round of 16. A year later, Limanovia achieved promotion once again, to the II liga.

In 2014, the club avoided relegation as the club bought Kolejarz Stróże's licence and started the 2014–15 season in the third division.

== Honours ==
- II liga
  - Tenth place: 2013–14
- Polish Cup
  - Round of 16: 2011–12
- Polish Cup (Lesser Poland regionals)
  - Winners: 2010–11, 2011–12

== Current squad ==
As of 10 April 2015.

Note: Flags indicate national team as defined under FIFA eligibility rules; some limited exceptions apply. Players may hold more than one non-FIFA nationality.

No.	Pos.	Nation	Player
—	GK	POL	Hubert Bieda
—	GK	POL	Daniel Bomba
—	GK	POL	Wojciech Mastalerz
—	GK	POL	Waldemar Sotnicki
—	DF	POL	Paweł Czajka
—	DF	POL	Arkadiusz Garzeł
—	DF	POL	Bartłomiej Hudecki
—	DF	POL	Paweł Kępa
—	DF	POL	Radosław Kulewicz
—	DF	POL	Radosław Kuligowski
—	DF	POL	Mateusz Niechciał
—	DF	POL	Michał Ruchałowski
—	MF	POL	Dawid Basta
—	MF	POL	Marcin Byszewski
—	MF	POL	Jakub Downar-Zapolski

No.	Pos.	Nation	Player
—	MF	POL	Rafał Komorek
—	MF	POL	Damian Majcher
—	MF	POL	Mateusz Orzechowski
—	MF	POL	Bartłomiej Pająk
—	MF	POL	Łukasz Pietras
—	MF	POL	Józef Piwowarczyk
—	MF	POL	Paweł Pyciak
—	MF	SEN	Lifa Sadio
—	MF	SEN	Karamo Sané
—	MF	POL	Arkadiusz Serafin
—	MF	POL	Artur Skiba
—	FW	POL	Wojciech Dziadzio
—	FW	POL	Mariusz Mężyk (on loan from Kolejarz Stróże)
—	FW	POL	Jacek Pietrzak
20	MF	SVK	Miroslav Poliaček
