= Górnik Polkowice =

Polish football club

- Full name: Klub Sportowy Górnik Polkowice
- Nickname: Coal Boys
- Founded: 1947; 79 years ago (as KS Włókniarz)
- Ground: Kopalniana Street Stadium
- Capacity: 4,886 (3,885 seats)
- Owner: Gmina Polkowice
- Chairman: Piotr Pałaszewski
- Manager: Andrzej Sawicki
- League: III liga, group III
- 2025–26: III liga, group III, 2nd of 18
- Website: http://www.ksgornik.eu/
Home colours	Away colours	Third colours

KS Górnik Polkowice is a Polish football club based in Polkowice. The club currently plays in III liga which is the fourth tier of Polish football. They competed in the top tier for one season in 2003–04.

== History ==
KS Górnik Polkowice were founded in 1947.

From 2003 until 2004, Górnik played their only season in Ekstraklasa, the top tier of Polish football. They drew 0–0 against Świt Nowy Dwór Mazowiecki to finish 14th, which qualified them for a relegation play-out against Cracovia. They lost the relegation play-out 8–0 on aggregate.

In 2021, after winning the II liga, Górnik were promoted to I liga, making their return after they were relegated at the end of the 2011–12 season.

=== Naming history ===
- Klub Sportowy „Włókniarz” Polkowice – 1947
- Ludowy Zespół Sportowy Polkowice – 1951
- Terenowy Klub Sportowy „Górnik” – 1967
- Międzyzakładowy Klub Sportowy „Górnik” Polkowice – 1977
- Klub Sportowy „Górnik” Polkowice – 1987
- Klub Sportowy Polkowice sp. z o.o. – 2011
- Klub Sportowy Górnik Polkowice – 2018

== Current squad ==
As of 12 September 2025

Note: Flags indicate national team as defined under FIFA eligibility rules; some limited exceptions apply. Players may hold more than one non-FIFA nationality.

No.	Pos.	Nation	Player
1	GK	POL	Marcin Furtak
4	DF	POL	Jarosław Ratajczak (captain)
5	DF	POL	Mateusz Stawny
6	MF	POL	Rafał Karmelita
7	MF	POL	Maksymilian Czajka
8	MF	POL	Mateusz Solarz
9	DF	POL	Oliwier Mojzyk
10	MF	POL	Marcel Chudek
11	FW	POL	Mateusz Surożyński
12	GK	POL	Filip Anufrajonek
14	DF	POL	Michał Bogacz
15	DF	POL	Kacper Poczwardowski
17	FW	POL	Mariusz Szuszkiewicz
18	MF	POL	Mateusz Wołoszyn

No.	Pos.	Nation	Player
20	DF	POL	Jakub Rogalski
22	MF	POL	Oskar Leopold
23	FW	POL	Szymon Skrzypczak
24	MF	POL	Kacper Strzelecki
25	MF	POL	Kamil Sobczak
26	DF	POL	Bartosz Rymaniak
28	MF	POL	Jakub Wireński
29	FW	POL	Filip Baranowski
33	GK	POL	Wiktor Wernicki
35	DF	POL	Szymon Kwapisz
77	MF	POL	Kasjan Frankowski
90	FW	POL	Michał Nagrodzki
99	MF	POL	Miłosz Jóźwiak

== Managers ==
- 1956–1970 – Tadeusz Ptasznik
- 1970–1971 – Ryszard Łakomiec
- 1971–1972 – Wojciech Gawryszewski
- 1973–1975 – Alojzy Sitko
- 1975–1976 – Roman Badak
- 1976–1981 – Krzysztof Pawlica
- 1981–1982 – Bogdan Jankowski, Stefan Beńko
- 1983–1987 – Henryk Markowski
- 1988 – Andrzej Kot
- 1989 – Mieczysław Bieniusiewicz, Edward Wojewódzki
- 1989–1990 – Rudolf Rupa, Piotr Wójcik
- 1991–1992 – Krzysztof Pawlica
- 1992–1993 – Ireneusz Frąckowiak, Marian Putyra
- 1994–1995 – Artur Sikorski
- 1996 – Bruno Zachariasiewicz, Artur Sikorski
- 1997 – Stanisław Kumik
- 1997–2001 – Mirosław Dragan
- 2001–2002 – Romuald Szukiełowicz
- 2002–2004 – Mirosław Dragan
- 2005 – Wiesław Wojno
- 2005 – Marek Koniarek
- 2006 – Mirosław Dragan
- 2006–2011 – Dominik Nowak
- 2011 – Bartłomiej Majewski
- 2011–2012 – Janusz Kudyba
- 2012–2013 – Adam Buczek
- 2013 – Janusz Kubot
- 2013 – Zbigniew Mandziejewicz
- 2014–2017 – Jarosław Pedryc
- 2017–2020 – Enkeleid Dobi
- 2020–2021 – Janusz Niedźwiedź
- 2021 – Paweł Barylski
- 2021–2022 – Szymon Szydełko
- 2022–2023 – Tomasz Grzegorczyk
- 2023–2024 – Enkeleid Dobi
- 2024–2025 – Ariel Sworacki
- 2025–present – Andrzej Sawicki
