= Kolejarz Stróże =

Polish football club

- Full name: Klub Sportowy Kolejarz Stróże
- Founded: 2 August 1949; 76 years ago (as TKS Stróże)
- Ground: Stadion Kolejarz Stróże
- Capacity: 3,000
- Chairman: Mirosław Matusik
- Manager: Walid Kandel
- League: V liga Lesser Poland East
- 2024–25: V liga Lesser Poland East, 5th of 16
Home colours	Away colours	Third colours

Kolejarz Stróże is a Polish football club based in Stróże, currently playing in the eastern group of V liga Lesser Poland.

Kolejarz's biggest success since their foundation in 1949 was finishing in the fourth place of 2011–12 I liga, just two years after their first promotion to the second tier. After the 2014 demotion to the third division, the club merged with Limanowa-based Limanovia. Kolejarz, reestablished, began competing in the Nowy Sącz Klasa A (7th tier).

== Current squad ==
As of 25 August 2013

Note: Flags indicate national team as defined under FIFA eligibility rules; some limited exceptions apply. Players may hold more than one non-FIFA nationality.

No.	Pos.	Nation	Player
1	GK	POL	Łukasz Radliński
5	DF	POL	Dawid Szufryn
6	MF	POL	Marcin Klatt
7	MF	POL	Marcin Stefanik
8	MF	POL	Adam Giesa
9	FW	POL	Krzysztof Kaliciak
10	DF	POL	Krzysztof Markowski
11	FW	POL	Krzysztof Gajtkowski
12	GK	POL	Mariusz Rozalski
13	DF	POL	Witold Cichy

No.	Pos.	Nation	Player
14	MF	POL	Patryk Szymański
15	MF	POL	Michał Gryźlak
18	MF	POL	Michał Bajdur
19	MF	POL	Wojciech Trochim
21	DF	POL	Dariusz Walęciak
23	DF	SEN	Cheikh Niane
27	MF	POL	Janusz Wolański
—	MF	POL	Paweł Leśniak
—	MF	POL	Marcin Majchrzak
—	FW	POL	Adrian Danek

=== Out on loan ===
Note: Flags indicate national team as defined under FIFA eligibility rules; some limited exceptions apply. Players may hold more than one non-FIFA nationality.

No.	Pos.	Nation	Player

== Notable players ==
Had international caps for Poland.

- (Poland) Piotr Madejski (2010–2011)
- (Poland) Grzegorz Piechna (2009)
- (Poland) Grzegorz Tomala (2003–2005)
