= 2014–15 Polish Cup =

Puchar Polski

Tournament details
- Country: Poland
- Dates: 19 July 2014 – 2 May 2015
- Teams: 86

Final positions
- Champions: Legia Warsaw
- Runners-up: Lech Poznań

Tournament statistics
- Matches played: 91
- Goals scored: 297 (3.26 per match)
- Top goal scorer(s): Mateusz Argasiński; Maciej Górski; Zaur Sadayev; Emil Wrażeń (4 goals each)

The 2014–15 Polish Cup was the 61st season of the annual Polish football knockout tournament. It began on 19 July 2014 with the first matches of the extra preliminary round and ended on 2 May 2015 with the Final, in which Legia Warsaw defeated Lech Poznań for a record 17th title. As winners, Legia qualified for the qualifying tournament of the 2015–16 UEFA Europa League.

Zawisza Bydgoszcz were the defending champions, having won their first title in the previous season, but were eliminated in the last 32 by Podbeskidzie Bielsko-Biała.

== Participating teams ==
Enter in Round of 32	Enter in first round	Enter in Extra preliminary round		
2013–14 Ekstraklasa; 16 teams	2013–14 I Liga; 18 teams	2013–14 II liga 36 teams		Winners of 16 regional cup competitions
Legia Warsaw; Lech Poznań; Ruch Chorzów; Lechia Gdańsk; Wisła Kraków; Górnik Zabrze; Pogoń Szczecin; Zawisza Bydgoszcz; Śląsk Wrocław; Podbeskidzie Bielsko-Biała; Jagiellonia Białystok; Piast Gliwice; Korona Kielce; Cracovia; Widzew Łódź; Zagłębie Lubin	GKS Bełchatów; Górnik Łęczna; Dolcan Ząbki; Arka Gdynia; Termalica Bruk-Bet Nieciecza; Olimpia Grudziądz; Wisła Płock; GKS Katowice; Sandecja Nowy Sącz; Miedź Legnica; ~~Kolejarz Stróże~~^{1}; Flota Świnoujście; GKS Tychy; Chojniczanka Chojnice; Stomil Olsztyn; Puszcza Niepołomice; Energetyk ROW Rybnik; Okocimski KS Brzesko	Wigry Suwałki; Pogoń Siedlce; Siarka Tarnobrzeg; Legionovia Legionowo; Stal Stalowa Wola; Znicz Pruszków; Stal Mielec; Wisła Puławy; Olimpia Elbląg; ~~Limanovia Limanowa~~^{1}; Stal Rzeszów; Radomiak Radom; Pelikan Łowicz; Olimpia Zambrów; Motor Lublin; Garbarnia Kraków; Concordia Elbląg; Świt Nowy Dwór Mazowiecki	Chrobry Głogów; Bytovia Bytów; Zagłębie Sosnowiec; Błękitni Stargard Szczeciński; MKS Kluczbork; Górnik Wałbrzych; Rozwój Katowice; ~~Warta Poznań~~^{2}; Polonia Bytom; Raków Częstochowa; Gryf Wejherowo; Odra Opole; Ruch Zdzieszowice; Ostrovia Ostrów Wielkopolski; Calisia Kalisz; UKP Zielona Góra; Jarota Jarocin; KS Polkowice	Zagłębie II Lubin (Lower Silesia); Unia Solec Kujawski (Kujawy-Pomerania); Podlasie Biała Podlaska (Lublin); Piast Karnin (Lubusz); Lechia Tomaszów Mazowiecki (Łódź); MKS Trzebinia-Siersza (Lesser Poland); Sparta Jazgarzew (Mazovia); Małapanew Ozimek (Opole); Stal II Rzeszów (Podkarpacie); Wissa Szczuczyn (Podlasie); Brda Przechlewo (Pomerania); Pniówek Pawłowice Śląskie (Silesia); Łysica Bodzentyn (Świętokrzyskie); Sokół Ostróda (Warmia-Masuria); Sokół Kleczew (Greater Poland); Kotwica Kołobrzeg (West Pomerania)

Source: 90minut.pl Notes:

1. Following the takeover of the I Liga team Kolejarz Stróże by Limanovia Limanowa, the club w decided to waive their spot in the preliminary round. The Polish FA ruled that the withdrawal is effective also for the first round spot ceded to Limanovia by Kolejarz.
2. Warta failed to register for the competition.

== Round and draw dates ==
Round	Draw date	First leg	Second leg
Extra preliminary round	26 June 2014	19 July 2014	—
Preliminary roud	26 June 2014	26 July 2014	—
First round	26 June 2014	1 August 2014	—
Round of 32	14 August 2014	24 September 2014	—
Round of 16	14 August 2014	29 October 2014	—
Quarter-finals	14 August 2014	4 March 2015	18 March 2015
Semi-finals	14 August 2014	1 April 2015	8 April 2015
Final	14 August 2014	2 May 2015 at National Stadium, Warsaw	—

Source: 90minut.pl

== First Preliminary Round ==
The draw for this round was conducted at the headquarters of the Polish FA on 26 June 2014. Participating in this round are 16 regional cup winners and 36 teams from the 2013–14 II Liga. The matches were played on 19 and 20 July 2014.

Team 1	Score	Team 2
19 July 2014
MKS Trzebinia-Siersza (4)	0–2	Legionovia Legionowo (3)
Podlasie Biała Podlaska (4)	1–1 (a.e.t.) (1–4 p)	Górnik Wałbrzych (3)
Wissa Szczuczyn (5)	0–2	Znicz Pruszków (3)
Zagłębie II Lubin (4)	1–3	Chrobry Głogów (2)
Limanovia Limanowa (3)	0–3 (awarded)^{1}	Kotwica Kołobrzeg (3)
Pniówek Pawłowice Śląskie (4)	1–2	Siarka Tarnobrzeg (3)
Unia Solec Kujawski (4)	2–1	MKS Kluczbork (3)
Polonia Bytom (4)	1–0	Łysica Bodzentyn (4)
KS Polkowice (5)	2–3 (a.e.t.)	Stal Stalowa Wola (3)
Olimpia Elbląg (4)	7–0	Calisia Kalisz (–)
Pogoń Siedlce (2)	2–1	Bytovia Bytów (2)
UKP Zielona Góra (4)	0–3	Wigry Suwałki (2)
Warta Poznań (4)	0–3 (awarded)^{2}	Wisła Puławy (3)
Piast Karnin (4)	0–5	Raków Częstochowa (3)
Małapanew Ozimek (4)	1–6	Błękitni Stargard Szczeciński (3)
Radomiak Radom (4)	3–0	Sokół Ostróda (4)
Sparta Jazgarzew (5)	4–1	Stal Mielec (3)
Pelikan Łowicz (4)	0–0 (a.e.t.) (7–6 p)	Lechia Tomaszów Mazowiecki (4)
Sokół Kleczew (4)	1–1 (a.e.t.) (5–4 p)	Zagłębie Sosnowiec (3)
Stal II Rzeszów (6)	0–2	Świt Nowy Dwór Mazowiecki (4)
Motor Lublin (4)	5–0	Jarota Jarocin (4)
Odra Opole (4)	5–0	Garbarnia Kraków (4)
Ruch Zdzieszowice (4)	1–3 (a.e.t.)	Ostrovia Ostrów Wielkopolski (4)
Olimpia Zambrów (4)	0–3	Rozwój Katowice (3)
Stal Rzeszów (4)	5–0	Concordia Elbląg (4)
20 July 2014
Brda Przechlewo (6)	1–4	Gryf Wejherowo (4)

Notes

- Note 1: Limanovia failed to register for the competition.
- Note 2: Warta failed to register for the competition.

== Second Preliminary Round ==
The draw for this round was conducted at the headquarters of the Polish FA on 26 June 2014. The matches were played on 26 and 27 July 2014.

Team 1	Score	Team 2
26 July 2014
Legionovia Legionowo (3)	1–2	Rozwój Katowice (3)
Odra Opole (4)	1–2	Znicz Pruszków (3)
Motor Lublin (4)	0–4	Chrobry Głogów (2)
Gryf Wejherowo (4)	2–0	Kotwica Kołobrzeg (3)
Świt Nowy Dwór Mazowiecki (4)	2–3	Siarka Tarnobrzeg (3)
Sokół Kleczew (4)	3–0	Unia Solec Kujawski (4)
Polonia Bytom (4)	1–0	Pelikan Łowicz (4)
Sparta Jazgarzew (5)	2–5	Stal Stalowa Wola (3)
Olimpia Elbląg (4)	1–2	Radomiak Radom (4)
Błękitni Stargard Szczeciński (3)	3–1	Pogoń Siedlce (2)
Raków Częstochowa (3)	0–1	Wigry Suwałki (2)
27 July 2014
Ostrovia Ostrów Wielkopolski (4)	3–1	Górnik Wałbrzych (3)
No match
Wisła Puławy (3)	bye to the next round	
Stal Rzeszów (4)	bye to the next round	

== First round ==
The draw for this round was conducted at the headquarters of the Polish FA on 26 June 2014. The matches were played on 12 and 13 August 2014. Joining in this round are the 18 teams from 2013–14 I Liga.

Team 1	Score	Team 2
12 August 2014
Energetyk ROW Rybnik (3)	2–1	Siarka Tarnobrzeg (3)
Znicz Pruszków (3)	2–1	Termalica Bruk-Bet Nieciecza (2)
Stal Stalowa Wola (3)	2–0	Olimpia Grudziądz (2)
13 August 2014
Kolejarz Stróże (7)	0–3 (awarded)^{1}	Wisła Puławy (3)
Rozwój Katowice (3)	0–1	GKS Tychy (2)
Ostrovia Ostrów Wielkopolski (4)	2–1 (a.e.t.)	Puszcza Niepołomice (3)
GKS Katowice (2)	1–2	Chrobry Głogów (2)
Gryf Wejherowo (4)	1–0	Arka Gdynia (2)
Sokół Kleczew (4)	1–4	Miedź Legnica (2)
Polonia Bytom (4)	1–3	Wisła Płock (2)
Radomiak Radom (4)	1–2 (a.e.t.)	Dolcan Ząbki (2)
Błękitni Stargard Szczeciński (3)	1–0	Chojniczanka Chojnice (2)
Flota Świnoujście (2)	2–0	Wigry Suwałki (2)
Stal Rzeszów (4)	2–1	Górnik Łęczna (1)
Okocimski KS Brzesko (3)	2–1	Stomil Olsztyn (2)
Sandecja Nowy Sącz (2)	0–1	GKS Bełchatów (1)

Notes

- Note 1: Following the takeover of the I Liga team Kolejarz Stróże by Limanovia Limanowa, the club decided to waive their spot in the first round.

== Bracket ==
Round of 32
Miedź Legnica	0
Legia Warsaw	4
Dolcan Ząbki	2
Pogoń Szczecin	3
Widzew Łódź	1
Śląsk Wrocław	2
Stal Stalowa Wola	2
Lechia Gdańsk	1
Flota Świnoujście	1
GKS Bełchatów	2
Wisła Puławy	1(3)
Piast Gliwice	1(4)
Górnik Zabrze	2
Korona Kielce	1
Zawisza Bydgoszcz	0
Podbeskidzie Bielsko-Biała	2
Ostrovia Ostrów Wielkopolski	2
Ruch Chorzów	1
Okocimski KS Brzesko	1
Cracovia	2
Gryf Wejherowo	1
Błękitni Stargard Szczeciński	2
Wisła Płock	2(3)
GKS Tychy	2(4)
Stal Rzeszów	1
Znicz Pruszków	3
Energetyk ROW Rybnik	0
Zagłębie Lubin	4
Chrobry Głogów	1
Jagiellonia Białystok	3
Lech Poznań	2
Wisła Kraków	0

Round of 16
Legia Warsaw	3
Pogoń Szczecin	1
Śląsk Wrocław	1
Stal Stalowa Wola	0
GKS Bełchatów	0
Piast Gliwice	5
Górnik Zabrze	2
Podbeskidzie Bielsko-Biała	4
Ostrovia Ostrów Wielkopolski	1
Cracovia	2
Błękitni Stargard Szczeciński	3
GKS Tychy	2
Znicz Pruszków	2
Zagłębie Lubin	1
Jagiellonia Białystok	2
Lech Poznań	4

Quarterfinals
Legia Warsaw	1	1(3)
Śląsk Wrocław	1	1(1)
Piast Gliwice	1	0
Podbeskidzie Bielsko-Biała	2	1
Cracovia	0	0
Błękitni Stargard Szczeciński	2	2
Znicz Pruszków	1	0
Lech Poznań	5	1

Semifinals
Legia Warsaw	4	2
Podbeskidzie Bielsko-Biała	1	0
Błękitni Stargard Szczeciński	3	1
Lech Poznań	1	5

Final
Legia Warsaw	2
Lech Poznań	1

== Round of 32 ==
The draw for this round was conducted at National Stadium, Warsaw on 14 August 2014. Participating in this round are the 16 winners of the first round along with the 16 teams from 2013–14 Ekstraklasa. The matches were played on 23, 24 and 25 September 2014.

Team 1	Score	Team 2
23 September 2014
Widzew Łódź (2)	1–2	Śląsk Wrocław (1)
Wisła Puławy (3)	1–1 (a.e.t.) (3–4 p)	Piast Gliwice (1)
Górnik Zabrze (1)	2–1	Korona Kielce (1)
24 September 2014
Miedź Legnica (2)	0–4	Legia Warsaw (1)
Dolcan Ząbki (2)	2–3 (a.e.t.)	Pogoń Szczecin (1)
Stal Stalowa Wola (3)	2–1	Lechia Gdańsk (1)
Flota Świnoujście (2)	1–2	GKS Bełchatów (1)
Zawisza Bydgoszcz (1)	0–2	Podbeskidzie Bielsko-Biała (1)
Ostrovia Ostrów Wielkopolski (4)	2–1	Ruch Chorzów (1)
Okocimski KS Brzesko (3)	1–2	Cracovia (1)
Gryf Wejherowo (4)	1–2	Błękitni Stargard Szczeciński (3)
Wisła Płock (2)	2–2 (a.e.t.) (3–4 p)	GKS Tychy (2)
Stal Rzeszów (4)	1–3	Znicz Pruszków (3)
Energetyk ROW Rybnik (3)	0–4	Zagłębie Lubin (2)
Lech Poznań (1)	2–0	Wisła Kraków (1)
25 September 2014
Chrobry Głogów (2)	1–3	Jagiellonia Białystok (1)

23 September 2014	Górnik Zabrze	2–1	Korona Kielce	Zabrze
18:00 CEST (UTC+02:00)	Plizga 36'; Łuczak 85'		Khizhnichenko 48'	Stadium: Ernest Pohl Stadium; Attendance: 1,500; Referee: Tomasz Radkiewicz (Łódź)

23 September 2014	Wisła Puławy	1–1 (a.e.t.) (3–4 p)	Piast Gliwice	Puławy
19:00 CEST (UTC+02:00)	Nowak 6'		Kędziora 88' (pen.)	Stadium: Stadion MOSiR; Attendance: 900; Referee: Sebastian Krasny (Kraków)
	Penalties
	Lisiecki (penalty scored); Maksymiuk (penalty missed); Charzewski (penalty scored); Machalski (penalty scored); Fedoriv (penalty missed)		Badía (penalty scored); Podgórski (penalty scored); Kędziora (penalty scored); Martínez (penalty scored); Ižvolt (penalty missed)

23 September 2014	Widzew Łódź	1–2	Śląsk Wrocław	Łódź
20:00 CEST (UTC+02:00)	Kwiek 9'		Machaj 38'; F. Paixão 57'	Stadium: Stadion Widzewa; Attendance: 1,000; Referee: Marcin Szczerbowicz (Olsztyn)

24 September 2014	Dolcan Ząbki	2–3 (a.e.t.)	Pogoń Szczecin	Ząbki
15:00 CEST (UTC+02:00)	Wiśniewski 76'; Chałas 112'		Robak 14'; Małecki 96', 102'	Stadium: Stadion Dolcanu; Attendance: 500; Referee: Piotr Idzik (Poznań)

24 September 2014	Flota Świnoujście	1–2	GKS Bełchatów	Świnoujście
15:00 CEST (UTC+02:00)	Nwaogu 31'		Wroński 66'; Mi. Mak 90+2'	Stadium: Stadion Miejski; Attendance: 580; Referee: Wojciech Krztoń (Olsztyn)

24 September 2014	Gryf Wejherowo	1–2	Błękitni Stargard Szczeciński	Wejherowo
15:30 CEST (UTC+02:00)	Rzepa 35'		Gajda 24' (pen.); Inczewski 84'	Stadium: Stadion WKS Gryf; Attendance: 500; Referee: Kamil Waskowski (Poznań)

24 September 2014	Okocimski KS Brzesko	1–2	Cracovia	Brzesko
16:00 CEST (UTC+02:00)	Garzeł 31'		Dudzic 9'; Rakels 90+4'	Stadium: Stadion Okocimskiego KS; Attendance: 1,000; Referee: Dawid Bukowczan (Żywiec)

24 September 2014	KP Ostrovia Ostrów Wielkopolski	2–1	Ruch Chorzów	Ostrów Wielkopolski
16:00 CEST (UTC+02:00)	Szymanowski 38'; Cyfert 82' (pen.)		Starzyński 17'	Stadium: Stadion Miejski; Attendance: 2,500; Referee: Artur Aluszyk (Barlinek)

24 September 2014	Stal Rzeszów	1–3	Znicz Pruszków	Rzeszów
16:00 CEST (UTC+02:00)	Szczoczarz 57'		Tomczyk 29' (pen.); Górski 40', 49'	Stadium: Stadion Miejski; Attendance: 500; Referee: Grzegorz Jabłoński (Kraków)

24 September 2014	Stal Stalowa Wola	2–1	Lechia Gdańsk	Stalowa Wola
16:00 CEST (UTC+02:00)	Kałat 38'; Płonka 52'		Grzelczak 77'	Stadium: Stadion MOSiR; Attendance: 2,000; Referee: Tomasz Wajda (Żywiec)

24 September 2014	Miedź Legnica	0–4	Legia Warsaw	Legnica
17:45 CEST (UTC+02:00)			Vrdoljak 22'; Radović 48', 90'; Kosecki 56'	Stadium: Stadion im.Orła Białego; Attendance: 5,100; Referee: Zbigniew Dobrynin (Łódź)

24 September 2014	Wisła Płock	2–2 (a.e.t.) (3–4 p)	GKS Tychy	Płock
18:00 CEST (UTC+02:00)	Krzywicki 33'; Ruszkul 77'		Kowalczyk 85' (pen.), 90+1'	Stadium: Kazimierz Górski Stadium; Attendance: 600; Referee: Łukasz Szczech (Kobyłka)
	Penalties
	Magdoń (penalty scored); Krzywicki (penalty scored); Hempel (penalty missed); Góralski (penalty scored); Ruszkul (penalty missed)		Kowalczyk (penalty scored); Nitkiewicz (penalty scored); Wodecki (penalty scored); Ruskovský (penalty scored)

24 September 2014	Zawisza Bydgoszcz	0–2	Podbeskidzie Bielsko-Biała	Bydgoszcz
18:00 CEST (UTC+02:00)			Pietrasiak 56', 71'	Stadium: Zdzisław Krzyszkowiak Stadium; Attendance: 1,000; Referee: Marek Opaliński (Lubin)

24 September 2014	Energetyk ROW Rybnik	0–4	Zagłębie Lubin	Rybnik
18:30 CEST (UTC+02:00)			Godál 16'; Kwiek 26'; Guldan 52'; K. Piątek 58'	Stadium: Stadion MOSiR; Attendance: 1,174; Referee: Mariusz Korpalski (Toruń)

24 September 2014	Lech Poznań	2–0	Wisła Kraków	Poznań
20:45 CEST (UTC+02:00)	Pawłowski 66', 77'			Stadium: INEA Stadium; Attendance: 10,695; Referee: Tomasz Kwiatkowski (Warsaw)

25 September 2014	Chrobry Głogów	1–3	Jagiellonia Białystok	Głogów
18:00 CEST (UTC+02:00)	Szczepaniak 49'		Gajos 60'; Piątkowski 88'; Tuszyński 90+1'	Stadium: Stadion Chrobrego; Attendance: 1,800; Referee: Jarosław Rynkiewicz (Gorzów Wlkp.)

== Round of 16 ==
Competing in this round are the 16 winners from the previous round. The draw for this round was conducted at National Stadium, Warsaw on 14 August 2014. Matches were played on 15, 28, 29 and 30 October 2014.

Team 1	Score	Team 2
15 October 2014
Błękitni Stargard Szczeciński (3)	3–2	GKS Tychy (2)
Znicz Pruszków (3)	2–1	Zagłębie Lubin (2)
28 October 2014
Stal Stalowa Wola (3)	0–1	Śląsk Wrocław (1)
Górnik Zabrze (1)	2–4	Podbeskidzie Bielsko-Biała (1)
29 October 2014
Ostrovia Ostrów Wielkopolski (4)	1–2 (a.e.t.)	Cracovia (1)
Piast Gliwice (1)	5–0	GKS Bełchatów (1)
30 October 2014
Lech Poznań (1)	4–2 (a.e.t.)	Jagiellonia Białystok (1)
Legia Warsaw (1)	3–1 (a.e.t.)	Pogoń Szczecin (1)

15 October 2014	Błękitni Stargard Szczeciński	3–2	GKS Tychy	Stargard Szczeciński
14:00 CEST (UTC+02:00)	Gajda 43' (pen.); Fadecki 59'; Zdunek 85'		Smółka 24'; Radzewicz 45'	Stadium: Stadion Miejski; Attendance: 1,200; Referee: Paweł Pskit (Łódź)

15 October 2014	Znicz Pruszków	2–1	Zagłębie Lubin	Pruszków
17:45 CEST (UTC+02:00)	Grudniewski 20'; Górski 68'		Guldan 61' (pen.)	Stadium: Stadion Znicza; Attendance: 900; Referee: Rafał Rokosz (Katowice)

28 October 2014	Stal Stalowa Wola	0–1	Śląsk Wrocław	Stalowa Wola
13:00 CET (UTC+01:00)			Juanito 87'	Stadium: Stadion MOSiR; Attendance: 2,300; Referee: Marcin Szczerbowicz (Olsztyn)

28 October 2014	Górnik Zabrze	2–4	Podbeskidzie Bielsko-Biała	Zabrze
20:45 CET (UTC+01:00)	Ćerimagić 17'; Magiera 78' (pen.)		Horoszkiewicz 7'; Mańka 38' (o.g.); Korzym 66'; Magiera 70' (o.g.)	Stadium: Ernest Pohl Stadium; Attendance: 2,000; Referee: Tomasz Radkiewicz (Łódź)

29 October 2014	Ostrovia Ostrów Wielkopolski	1–2 (a.e.t.)	Cracovia	Ostrów Wielkopolski
12:00 CET (UTC+01:00)	Czech 71'		Kapustka 45+1'; Zjawiński 98'	Stadium: Stadion Miejski; Attendance: 7,000; Referee: Zbigniew Dobrynin (Łódź)

29 October 2014	Piast Gliwice	5–0	GKS Bełchatów	Gliwice
20:45 CET (UTC+01:00)	Badía 8', 36'; Janczyk 45', 63' (pen.); Vassiljev 74'			Stadium: Stadion Piast; Attendance: 1,231; Referee: Adam Lyczmański (Bydgoszcz)

30 October 2014	Lech Poznań	4–2 (a.e.t.)	Jagiellonia Białystok	Poznań
17:45 CET (UTC+01:00)	Sadayev 1'; Linetty 7', 120+1'; Douglas 112'		Gajos 16'; Arajuuri 26' (o.g.)	Stadium: INEA Stadion; Attendance: 10,237; Referee: Marcin Borski (Warsaw)

30 October 2014	Legia Warsaw	3−1 (a.e.t.)	Pogoń Szczecin	Warsaw
20:45 CET (UTC+01:00)	Żyro 22'; Broź 93' (pen.); Jodłowiec 107'		Zwoliński 11'	Stadium: Polish Army Stadium; Attendance: 15,412; Referee: Szymon Marciniak (Płock)

== Quarter-finals ==
The 8 winners from Round of 16 competed in this round.
The matches will be played in two legs. The first leg took place on 12 February, 3 and 4 March 2015, while the second legs were played on 5, 17, 18 and 19 March 2015.
The draw for this round was conducted at National Stadium, Warsaw on 14 August 2014.

Team 1	Agg.	Team 2	1st leg	2nd leg
Śląsk Wrocław (1)	2–2 (1–3 p)	Legia Warsaw (1)	1–1	1–1 (a.e.t.)
Piast Gliwice (1)	1–3	Podbeskidzie Bielsko-Biała (1)	1–2	0–1
Błękitni Stargard Szczeciński (3)	4–0	Cracovia (1)	2–0	2–0
Znicz Pruszków (3)	1–6	Lech Poznań (1)	1–5	0–1

=== First leg ===
12 February 2015	Śląsk Wrocław	1–1	Legia Warsaw	Wrocław
20:00 CET (UTC+01:00)	M. Paixão 85'		Żyro 45+3'	Stadium: Stadion Miejski; Attendance: 15,183; Referee: Adam Lyczmański (Bydgoszcz)

3 March 2015	Znicz Pruszków	1–5	Lech Poznań	Pruszków
18:00 CET (UTC+01:00)	Jędrych 50'		Linetty 17'; Formella 62'; Sadayev 65', 67'; Keita 90+2'	Stadium: Stadion Znicza; Attendance: 1,940; Referee: Tomasz Wajda (Żywiec)

4 March 2015	Błękitni Stargard Szczeciński	2–0	Cracovia	Stargard Szczeciński
14:00 CET (UTC+01:00)	Wiśniewski 88'; Sretenović 90+4' (o.g.)			Stadium: Stadion Miejski; Attendance: 2,000; Referee: Zbigniew Dobrynin (Łódź)

4 March 2015	Piast Gliwice	1–2	Podbeskidzie Bielsko-Biała	Gliwice
18:00 CET (UTC+01:00)	Ciechański 85'		Kołodziej 64' (pen.); Malinowski 67'	Stadium: Stadion Piast; Attendance: 2,103; Referee: Marcin Szczerbowicz (Olsztyn)

=== Second leg ===
5 March 2015	Legia Warsaw	1–1 (a.e.t.) (2–2 agg.) (3–1 p)	Śląsk Wrocław	Warsaw
20:00 CET (UTC+01:00)	Żyro 53'		Grajciar 12'	Stadium: Polish Army Stadium; Attendance: 21,464; Referee: Szymon Marciniak (Płock)
	Penalties
	Guilherme (penalty scored); Pinto (penalty scored); Duda (penalty missed); Saganowski (penalty scored)		(penalty scored) Hateley; (penalty missed) M. Paixão; (penalty missed) F. Paixão; (penalty missed) Lačný

17 March 2015	Cracovia	0–2 (0–4 agg.)	Błękitni Stargard Szczeciński	Kraków
17:45 CET (UTC+01:00)			Wiśniewski 30'; Flis 83'	Stadium: Marshal Józef Piłsudski Stadium; Attendance: 4,644; Referee: Tomasz Wajda (Żywiec)

18 March 2015	Lech Poznań	1–0 (6–1 agg.)	Znicz Pruszków	Poznań
17:45 CET (UTC+01:00)	Formella 89'			Stadium: INEA Stadium; Attendance: 8,273; Referee: Karol Rudziński (Nidzica)

19 March 2015	Podbeskidzie Bielsko-Biała	1–0 (3–1 agg.)	Piast Gliwice	Bielsko-Biała
16:00 CET (UTC+01:00)	Kołodziej 45'			Stadium: Stadion Miejski; Attendance: 2,710; Referee: Marcin Borski (Warsaw)

== Semi-finals ==
The 4 winners from the Quarterfinals competed in this round.
The matches will be played in two legs. The first leg took place on 1 April 2015, while the second legs were played on 8 and 9 April 2015.
The draw for this round was conducted at National Stadium, Warsaw on 14 August 2014.

Team 1	Agg.	Team 2	1st leg	2nd leg
Podbeskidzie Bielsko-Biała (1)	1–6	Legia Warsaw (1)	1–4	0–2
Błękitni Stargard Szczeciński (3)	4–6	Lech Poznań (1)	3–1	1–5

=== First leg ===
1 April 2015	Błękitni Stargard Szczeciński	3–1	Lech Poznań	Stargard Szczeciński
16:30 CEST (UTC+02:00)	Pustelnik 54', 64'; Kosakiewicz 84'		Sadayev 9'	Stadium: Stadion Miejski; Attendance: 2,500; Referee: Jarosław Przybył (Kluczbork)

1 April 2015	Podbeskidzie Bielsko-Biała	1–4	Legia Warsaw	Bielsko-Biała
20:00 CEST (UTC+02:00)	Korzym 84'		Masłowski 24'; Vrdoljak 30'; Kucharczyk 71'; Kosecki 87'	Stadium: Stadion Miejski; Attendance: 5,864; Referee: Mariusz Złotek (Stalowa Wola)

=== Second leg ===
8 April 2015	Legia Warsaw	2–0 (6–1 agg.)	Podbeskidzie Bielsko-Biała	Warsaw
20:45 CEST (UTC+02:00)	Saganowski 19', 46'			Stadium: Polish Army Stadium; Attendance: 8,000; Referee: Zbigniew Dobrynin (Łódź)

9 April 2015	Lech Poznań	5–1 (a.e.t.) (6–4 agg.)	Błękitni Stargard Szczeciński	Poznań
20:45 CEST (UTC+02:00)	Arajuuri 34'; Formella 44'; Kownacki 74', 106'; Hämäläinen 100'		Wojtasiak 19'	Stadium: INEA Stadion; Attendance: 18,461; Referee: Paweł Gil (Lublin)

== Final ==
The Polish cup Final is being held at the Stadion Narodowy, Warsaw on 2 May 2015.

2 May 2015
16:00 CEST (UTC+02:00)

Lech Poznań	1–2	Legia Warsaw
Jodłowiec 20' (o.g.)		Jodłowiec 30'; Saganowski 54'

Stadion Narodowy, Warsaw
Attendance: 45,322
Referee: Daniel Stefański (Bydgoszcz)

Lech Poznań	Legia Warsaw

GK	33	(Poland) Maciej Gostomski
RB	4	(Poland) Tomasz Kędziora
CB	23	(Finland) Paulus Arajuuri
CB	35	(Poland) Marcin Kamiński
LB	3	(Scotland) Barry Douglas	(yellow card) 51' (yellow-red card) 88'
CM	6	(Poland) Łukasz Trałka (c)	(yellow card) 44'
CM	7	(Poland) Karol Linetty		(substituted off) 68'
RM	24	(Poland) Dawid Kownacki
AM	19	(Finland) Kasper Hämäläinen
LM	8	(Poland) Szymon Pawłowski		(substituted off) 79'
CF	95	(Russia) Zaur Sadayev		(substituted off) 72'
Substitutes:
GK	1	(Bosnia and Herzegovina) Jasmin Burić
DF	5	(Hungary) Tamás Kádár
MF	16	(Switzerland) Darko Jevtić		(substituted on) 68'
DF	25	(Panama) Luis Henríquez
FW	28	(Poland) Dariusz Formella		(substituted on) 72'
MF	77	(Norway) Muhamed Keita		(substituted on) 79'
MF	88	(Belgium) Arnaud Djoum
Manager:
(Poland) Maciej Skorża

GK	12	(Slovakia) Dušan Kuciak
RB	28	(Poland) Łukasz Broź
CB	25	(Poland) Jakub Rzeźniczak
CB	15	(Spain) Iñaki Astiz
LB	17	(Poland) Tomasz Brzyski
CM	3	(Poland) Tomasz Jodłowiec
CM	21	(Croatia) Ivica Vrdoljak (c)
RM	6	(Brazil) Guilherme		(substituted off) 37'
AM	8	(Slovakia) Ondrej Duda	(yellow card) 12'	(substituted off) 79'
LM	18	(Poland) Michał Kucharczyk	(yellow card) 64'
CF	9	(Poland) Marek Saganowski
Substitutes:
GK	34	(Poland) Arkadiusz Malarz
DF	4	(Poland) Igor Lewczuk
MF	16	(Poland) Michał Masłowski		(substituted on) 79'
DF	19	(Poland) Bartosz Bereszyński
MF	20	(Poland) Jakub Kosecki		(substituted on) 89'
MF	33	(Poland) Michał Żyro		(substituted on) 37'	(substituted off) 89'
FW	45	(Poland) Adam Ryczkowski
Manager:
(Norway) Henning Berg

== See also ==
- 2014–15 Ekstraklasa
