= 2014–15 Lech Poznań season =

Lech Poznań
2014–15 season
- Chairman: Karol Klimczak
- Manager: Maciej Skorża (From 1 September 2014); Krzysztof Chrobak (From 12 August 2014 to 1 September 2014); Mariusz Rumak (Until 12 August 2014)
- Stadium: INEA Stadion
- Ekstraklasa: 1st
- Polish Cup: Runners-up
- UEFA Europa League: Third qualifying round
- Top goalscorer: League: Kasper Hämäläinen (13 goals); All: Kasper Hämäläinen (15 goals)
- Highest home attendance: Ekstraklasa: 41,556 vs. Wisła K. (7 June 2015)
- Lowest home attendance: Ekstraklasa: 0 vs. Piast Gliwice (20 July 2014)
- Average home league attendance: 18,999
Home colours	Away colours

Lech Poznań is a Polish football club based in Poznań. This was their 92nd season overall. They competed in Ekstraklasa, the highest ranking league in Poland, Polish Cup and UEFA Europa League qualifying.

== Squad ==
Note: Flags indicate national team as defined under FIFA eligibility rules; some limited exceptions apply. Players may hold more than one non-FIFA nationality.

No.	Pos.	Nation	Player
1	GK	BIH	Jasmin Burić
3	DF	SCO	Barry Douglas
4	DF	POL	Tomasz Kędziora
5	DF	HUN	Tamás Kádár
6	MF	POL	Łukasz Trałka (captain)
7	MF	POL	Karol Linetty
8	MF	POL	Szymon Pawłowski
11	MF	HUN	Gergő Lovrencsics
14	FW	SRB	Vojo Ubiparip
16	MF	SUI	Darko Jevtić
17	MF	POL	Szymon Drewniak
19	MF	FIN	Kasper Hämäläinen
20	MF	HUN	Dávid Holman (on loan from (Hungary) Ferencváros)
21	DF	GAM	Kebba Ceesay
22	MF	POL	Jakub Serafin
23	DF	FIN	Paulus Arajuuri

No.	Pos.	Nation	Player
24	FW	POL	Dawid Kownacki
25	DF	PAN	Luis Henríquez
26	DF	POL	Maciej Wilusz
27	GK	POL	Krzysztof Kotorowski
28	MF	POL	Dariusz Formella
31	MF	POL	Krystian Sanocki
33	GK	POL	Maciej Gostomski
34	DF	LAT	Antonijs Černomordijs
35	DF	POL	Marcin Kamiński
36	GK	POL	Mateusz Lis
37	MF	GER	Niklas Zulciak
40	DF	POL	Jan Bednarek
77	MF	NOR	Muhamed Keita
88	MF	CMR	Arnaud Djoum
95	FW	RUS	Zaur Sadayev (on loan from (Russia) Terek Grozny)

=== Out on loan ===
Note: Flags indicate national team as defined under FIFA eligibility rules; some limited exceptions apply. Players may hold more than one non-FIFA nationality.

No. / Pos. / Nation / Player; — / GK / POL / Karol Szymański (At Ostrovia Ostrów Wielkopolski)	No. / Pos. / Nation / Player

== Transfer ==
=== Summer transfer window ===
==== In ====
No.	Pos.	Nat.	Name	Age	EU	Moving from	Type	Transfer window	Ends	Transfer fee	Source
17	MF	(Poland)	Szymon Drewniak	21	EU	Górnik Zabrze	End of loan	Summer	Undisclosed	Free	
16	MF	(Switzerland) (Serbia)	Darko Jevtić	21	Non-EU	(Switzerland) Basel	Loan	Summer	2015	€100,000	
77	MF	(Norway) (The Gambia)	Muhamed Keita	23	Non-EU	(Norway) Strømsgodset	Transfer	Summer	2017	€600,000	
95	FW	(Russia)	Zaur Sadayev	24	Non-EU	(Russia) Terek Grozny	Loan	Summer	2015	Free	
22	MF	(Poland)	Jakub Serafin	18	EU		Transfer	Summer	Undisclosed	Youth system	
26	DF	(Poland)	Maciej Wilusz	25	EU	GKS Bełchatów	Transfer	Summer	2017	Free	

Total spending: ▼€700,000

==== Out ====
No.	Pos.	Nat.	Name	Age	EU	Moving to	Type	Transfer window	Transfer fee	Source
5	DF	(Colombia)	Manuel Arboleda	34	Non-EU		End of career	Summer		
22	MF	(South Africa)	Daylon Claasen	24	Non-EU	(Germany) 1860 Munich	Transfer	Summer	Free	
31	MF	(Serbia)	Dimitrije Injac	33	Non-EU	Widzew Łódź	End of contract	Summer	Free	
32	MF	(Poland)	Mateusz Możdżeń	23	EU	Lechia Gdańsk	Transfer	Summer	Free	
10	FW	(Poland)	Łukasz Teodorczyk	23	EU	(Ukraine) Dynamo Kyiv	Transfer	Summer	€4,000,000	
	MF	(Poland)	Szymon Zgarda	20	EU	Miedź Legnica	Loan	Summer	Free	

Total income: ▲€4,000,000

Total expenditure: ▲€3,300,000

=== Winter transfer window ===
==== In ====
No.	Pos.	Nat.	Name	Age	EU	Moving from	Type	Transfer window	Ends	Transfer fee	Source
34	DF	(Latvia)	Antonijs Černomordijs	18	EU	(Latvia) Daugavpils	Loan	Winter	2016	Free	
20	MF	(Hungary)	Dávid Holman	21	EU	(Hungary) Ferencváros	Loan	Winter	2016	€100,000	
16	MF	(Switzerland) (Serbia)	Darko Jevtić	21	Non-EU	(Switzerland) Basel	Transfer	Summer	2018	€350,000	
5	DF	(Hungary)	Tamás Kádár	24	EU	(Hungary) Diósgyőr	Transfer	Winter	2018	€450,000	
36	GK	(Poland)	Mateusz Lis	17	EU		Transfer	Winter	Undisclosed	Youth system	
31	MF	(Poland)	Krystian Sanocki	18	EU		Transfer	Winter	Undisclosed	Youth system	
31	MF	(Cameroon) (Belgium)	Arnaud Djoum	25	EU		Transfer	Winter	2015	Free	
37	MF	(Germany) (Poland)	Niklas Zulciak	20	EU		Transfer	Winter	Undisclosed	Youth system	

Total spending: ▼€900,000

==== Out ====
No.	Pos.	Nat.	Name	Age	EU	Moving to	Type	Transfer window	Transfer fee	Source
20	DF	(Poland)	Hubert Wołąkiewicz	29	EU	(Romania) Astra Giurgiu	End of contract	Winter	Free	

Total income: €0

Total expenditure: ▼€900,000

== Friendlies ==
Win Draw Loss

25 June 2014 Club friendly	Lech Poznań	1–2	Podbeskidzie Bielsko-Biała	Opalenica, Poland
17:00 CEST (UTC+02:00)	Kownacki 23'	Report	Bartlewski 52'; Wilusz 64' (o.g.)	Stadium: Hotel Remes Sport & Spa

2 July 2014 Club friendly	Lech Poznań	3–0	Lechia Gdańsk	Grodzisk Wielkopolski, Poland
11:00 CEST (UTC+02:00)	Jevtić 30'; Kędziora 57'; Ubiparip 81'	Report		Stadium: Dyskobolia Stadium

10 July 2014 Club friendly	Zagłębie Lubin	1–0	Lech Poznań	Lubin, Poland
18:00 CEST (UTC+02:00)	Piątek 84'	Report		Stadium: Stadion Zagłębia Lubin

17 September 2014 Club friendly	Warta Międzychód	0–2	Lech Poznań	Międzychód, Poland
16:30 CEST (UTC+02:00)		Report	Lovrencsics 65'; Ubiparip 80'	Referee: Szymon Lizak (Poznań)

2 October 2014 Club friendly	Lech Poznań	3–0	Jarota Jarocin	Poznań, Poland
16:00 CEST (UTC+02:00)	Henríquez 4'; Formella 22'; Wołąkiewicz 32' (pen.)	Report		Stadium: Lech Poznań training ground

11 October 2014 Club friendly	Lech Poznań	0–0	Pogoń Szczecin	Wronki, Poland
13:00 CEST (UTC+02:00)		Report		Stadium: Stadion Amiki

16 October 2014 Club friendly	Unia Swarzędz	0–1	Lech Poznań	Swarzędz, Poland
16:00 CEST (UTC+02:00)		Report	Linetty 54'	Stadium: Stadion Miejski

15 November 2014 Club friendly	Lech Poznań	1–1	Pogoń Szczecin	Wronki, Poland
12:00 CET (UTC+01:00)	Jevtić 59'	Report	Frączczak 30' (pen.)	Stadium: Stadion Amiki; Referee: Kamil Waskowski (Poznań)

17 January 2015 Club friendly	Lech Poznań	1–2	(Kazakhstan) Ordabasy	Kadriye, Turkey
16:30 CET (UTC+01:00)	Hämäläinen 24'	Report	Tazhimbetov 22'; Nurgaliyev 52' (pen.)	Stadium: IC Hotels Football Center

20 January 2015 Club friendly	Eskişehirspor (Turkey)	0–1	Lech Poznań	Kadriye, Turkey
16:00 CET (UTC+01:00)		Report	Hämäläinen 29'	Stadium: IC Hotels Football Center

29 January 2015 Club friendly	Lech Poznań	5–0	(Ukraine) Metalist Kharkiv	Turkey
16:00 CET (UTC+01:00)	Ubiparip 16', 31'; Kownacki 56', 60'; Kulakov 84' (o.g.)	Report		Referee: Tomasz Wajda (Poland)

1 February 2015 Club friendly	Lech Poznań	2–2	(Russia) Anzhi Makhachkala	Turkey
16:00 CET (UTC+01:00)	Hämäläinen 18'; Lovrencsics 90'	Report	Komkov 79'; Dzhamalutdinov 88'	Referee: Zbigniew Dobrynin (Poland)

4 February 2015 Club friendly	Lech Poznań	2–0	(Russia) Amkar Perm	Kadriye, Turkey
16:00 CET (UTC+01:00)	Holman 18' (pen.); Formella 52'	Report		Stadium: IC Hotels Football Center

5 February 2015 Club friendly	Lech Poznań	2–2	(Bulgaria) Levski Sofia	Belek, Turkey
16:00 CET (UTC+01:00)	Ubiparip 17'; Jevtić 76'	Report	Domovchiyski 9' (pen.), 36'	Stadium: Spice Hotel & Spa

11 February 2015 Club friendly	Lech Poznań	2–0	Unia Swarzędz	Poznań, Poland
13:30 CET (UTC+01:00)	Kownacki,	Report		Stadium: Lech Poznań training ground Attendance: 0

== Competitions ==
Win Draw Loss

=== Overall ===
Competition	Started round	Current position / round	Final position / round	First match	Last match
2014–15 Ekstraklasa	Matchday 1	—	Winners	20 July 2014	7 June 2015
2014–15 Polish Cup	Round of 32	—	Runners-up	24 September 2014	2 May 2015
UEFA Europa League	Second qualifying round	—	Third qualifying round	17 July 2014	7 August 2014

Source: Competitions

=== Overview ===
Competition	Record							
Competition	G	W	D	L	GF	GA	GD	Win %
Ekstraklasa	37	19	13	5	67	33	+34	51.35
Polish Cup	7	4	1	2	19	9	+10	57.14
UEFA Europa League	4	1	1	2	3	2	+1	25.00
Total	48	24	15	9	89	44	+45	50.00

Source: Competitions

=== Ekstraklasa ===
==== Regular season ====
===== League table =====
Pos	Team	Pld	W	D	L	GF	GA	GD	Pts	Qualification or relegation
1	Legia Warsaw	30	17	5	8	57	30	+27	56	Qualification to Championship round
2	Lech Poznań	30	14	12	4	52	27	+25	54	Qualification to Championship round
3	Jagiellonia Białystok	30	14	7	9	43	35	+8	49	Qualification to Championship round
4	Śląsk Wrocław	30	12	10	8	43	36	+7	46	Qualification to Championship round
5	Wisła Kraków	30	11	10	9	47	39	+8	43 (Note: Wisła Kraków ahead on head-to-head record; Górnik Zabrze – Wisła Kraków 0–5, Wisła Kraków – Górnik Zabrze 1–1)	Qualification to Championship round
6	Górnik Zabrze	30	11	10	9	43	43	0	43	Qualification to Championship round
7	Pogoń Szczecin	30	11	8	11	40	38	+2	41 (Note: Tied on head-to-head record, Pogoń Szczecin ahead on goal difference; Lechia Gdańsk – Pogoń Szczecin 0–1, Pogoń Szczecin – Lechia Gdańsk 0–1)	Qualification to Championship round
8	Lechia Gdańsk	30	11	8	11	36	37	−1	41	Qualification to Championship round
9	Korona Kielce	30	10	9	11	34	42	−8	39 (Note: Head-to-head record; Korona Kielce 10 pts, Piast Gliwice 6 pts, Podbeskidzie Bielsko-Biała 1 pt)	Qualification to the Relegation round
10	Piast Gliwice	30	11	6	13	38	43	−5	39	Qualification to the Relegation round
11	Podbeskidzie Bielsko-Biała	30	10	9	11	40	48	−8	39	Qualification to the Relegation round
12	Cracovia	30	10	7	13	35	41	−6	37	Qualification to the Relegation round
13	Górnik Łęczna	30	8	10	12	31	37	−6	34	Qualification to the Relegation round
14	Ruch Chorzów	30	8	9	13	33	38	−5	33	Qualification to the Relegation round
15	GKS Bełchatów	30	8	7	15	24	42	−18	31	Qualification to the Relegation round
16	Zawisza Bydgoszcz	30	8	5	17	32	52	−20	29	Qualification to the Relegation round

Updated to match(es) played on 29 April 2015. Source: 90minut.pl
Rules for classification: 1) points; 2) head-to-head points; 3) head-to-head goal difference; 4) head-to-head goals scored; 5) goal difference; 6) number of goals scored; 7) Fair play table; head-to-head record is used only after all the matches between the teams in question have been played.

===== Results summary =====
Overall								Home						Away					
Pld	W	D	L	GF	GA	GD	Pts	W	D	L	GF	GA	GD	W	D	L	GF	GA	GD
30	14	12	4	52	27	+25	54	10	4	1	34	11	+23	4	8	3	18	16	+2

Source: 90minut.pl

===== Results by round =====
Round	1	2	3	4	5	6	7	8	9	10	11	12	13	14	15	16	17	18	19	20	21	22	23	24	25	26	27	28	29	30
Ground	H	A	H	A	H	A	H	A	H	A	H	A	H	A	H	A	H	A	H	A	H	A	H	A	H	A	H	A	H	A
Result	W	D	L	W	D	D	D	L	W	D	W	D	W	D	D	L	W	W	W	D	W	D	W	L	W	W	D	D	W	W
Position	1	3	9	5	6	8	9	10	7	7	7	7	6	6	7	7	6	3	3	4	3	3	2	3	2	2	2	2	2	2

Source: "Ekstraklasa 2014/2015". 90minut.pl.
A = Away; H = Home; W = Win; D = Draw; L = Loss

===== Matches =====
Win Draw Loss

20 July 2014 Match 1	Lech Poznań	4–0	Piast Gliwice	Poznań
15:30 CEST (UTC+02:00)	Ubiparip 19', 84', 90'; Kownacki 36'	Report		Stadium: INEA Stadion; Attendance: 0 Referee: Paweł Gil (Lublin)

27 July 2014 Match 2	Górnik Zabrze	1–1	Lech Poznań	Zabrze
18:00 CEST (UTC+02:00)	Zachara 58'	Report	Teodorczyk 19'	Stadium: Ernest Pohl Stadium; Attendance: 3,000; Referee: Tomasz Musiał (Kraków)

3 August 2014 Match 3	Lech Poznań	2–3	Wisła Kraków	Poznań
18:00 CEST (UTC+02:00)	Wołąkiewicz 59' (pen.); Douglas 83'	Report	Garguła 17', 28'; Guerrier 87'	Stadium: INEA Stadion; Attendance: 16,264; Referee: Paweł Raczkowski (Warsaw)

10 August 2014 Match 4	Lechia Gdańsk	1–2	Lech Poznań	Gdańsk
15:30 CEST (UTC+02:00)	Vranješ 36' (pen.)	Report	Teodorczyk 80', 84'	Stadium: PGE Arena; Attendance: 25,529; Referee: Szymon Marciniak (Płock)

16 August 2014 Match 5	Lech Poznań	1–1	Pogoń Szczecin	Poznań
20:30 CEST (UTC+02:00)	Pawłowski 73'	Report	Robak 21'	Stadium: INEA Stadion; Attendance: 13,174; Referee: Tomasz Musiał (Kraków)

24 August 2014 Match 6	Ruch Chorzów	0–0	Lech Poznań	Chorzów
18:00 CEST (UTC+02:00)		Report		Stadium: Stadion Miejski; Attendance: 7,500; Referee: Paweł Raczkowski (Warsaw)

31 August 2014 Match 7	Lech Poznań	1–1	Cracovia	Poznań
18:00 CEST (UTC+02:00)	Hämäläinen 46'	Report	Budziński 22'	Stadium: INEA Stadion; Attendance: 14,884; Referee: Szymon Marciniak (Płock)

13 September 2014 Match 8	Jagiellonia Białystok	1–0	Lech Poznań	Białystok
18:00 CEST (UTC+02:00)	Piątkowski 5'	Report		Stadium: Stadion Miejski; Attendance: 7,350; Referee: Tomasz Kwiatkowski (Warsaw)

20 September 2014 Match 9	Lech Poznań	6–2	Zawisza Bydgoszcz	Poznań
20:30 CEST (UTC+02:00)	Sadayev 12'; Lovrencsics 18'; Hämäläinen 43'; Jevtić 51' (pen.), 82'; Pawłowski 66'	Report	Micael 32'; Wágner 41'	Stadium: INEA Stadion; Attendance: 11,078; Referee: Paweł Raczkowski (Warsaw)

27 September 2014 Match 10	Legia Warsaw	2–2	Lech Poznań	Warsaw
20:30 CEST (UTC+02:00)	Brzyski 76'; Júnior 90'	Report	Kamiński 33'; Formella 39'	Stadium: Polish Army Stadium; Attendance: 25,934; Referee: Bartosz Frankowski (Toruń)

5 October 2014 Match 11	Lech Poznań	5–0	GKS Bełchatów	Poznań
18:00 CEST (UTC+02:00)	Hämäläinen 17', 71'; Malarz 51' (o.g.); Lovrencsics 81'; Jevtić 86'	Report		Stadium: INEA Stadion; Attendance: 18,717; Referee: Tomasz Musiał (Kraków)

19 October 2014 Match 12	Korona Kielce	2–2	Lech Poznań	Kielce
15:30 CEST (UTC+02:00)	Kapo 16'; Sylwestrzak 90'	Report	Hämäläinen 5'; Pawłowski 28'	Stadium: Stadion Miejski; Attendance: 7,401; Referee: Krzysztof Jakubik (Siedlce)

26 October 2014 Match 13	Lech Poznań	1–0	Górnik Łęczna	Poznań
15:30 CET (UTC+01:00)	Keita 81'	Report		Stadium: INEA Stadion; Attendance: 14,882; Referee: Szymon Marciniak (Płock)

2 November 2014 Match 14	Śląsk Wrocław	1–1	Lech Poznań	Wrocław
15:30 CET (UTC+01:00)	Machaj 70'	Report	Jevtić 2'	Stadium: Stadion Miejski; Attendance: 22,687; Referee: Tomasz Kwiatkowski (Warsaw)

7 November 2014 Match 15	Lech Poznań	1–1	Podbeskidzie Bielsko-Biała	Poznań
20:30 CET (UTC+01:00)	Kownacki 6'	Report	Śpiączka 89'	Stadium: INEA Stadion; Attendance: 12,991; Referee: Mariusz Złotek (Stalowa Wola)

23 November 2014 Match 16	Piast Gliwice	3–2	Lech Poznań	Gliwice
18:00 CET (UTC+01:00)	Wilczek 47'; Szeliga 50'; Podgórski 86'	Report	Pawłowski 3'; Kamiński 68'	Stadium: Stadion Miejski; Attendance: 5,173; Referee: Szymon Marciniak (Płock)

30 November 2014 Match 17	Lech Poznań	3–0	Górnik Zabrze	Poznań
15:30 CET (UTC+01:00)	Hämäläinen 11'; Pawłowski 36'; Kędziora 63'	Report		Stadium: INEA Stadion; Attendance: 12,749; Referee: Bartosz Frankowski (Toruń)

7 December 2014 Match 18	Wisła Kraków	1–2	Lech Poznań	Kraków
18:00 CET (UTC+01:00)	Burliga 9'	Report	Kędziora 54'; Sadayev 84'	Stadium: Stadion Miejski im. Henryka Reymana; Attendance: 17,263; Referee: Bartosz Frankowski (Toruń)

13 December 2014 Match 19	Lech Poznań	1–0	Lechia Gdańsk	Poznań
18:00 CET (UTC+01:00)	Formella 32'	Report		Stadium: INEA Stadion; Attendance: 16,029; Referee: Tomasz Kwiatkowski (Warsaw)

14 February 2015 Match 20	Pogoń Szczecin	1–1	Lech Poznań	Szczecin
18:00 CET (UTC+01:00)	Robak 3'	Report	Arajuuri 90'	Stadium: Stadion Florian Krygier; Attendance: 9,684; Referee: Tomasz Musiał (Kraków)

22 February 2015 Match 21	Lech Poznań	2–1	Ruch Chorzów	Poznań
15:30 CET (UTC+01:00)	Sadayev 6'; Hämäläinen 34'	Report	Starzyński 78' (pen.)	Stadium: INEA Stadion; Attendance: 16,672; Referee: Mariusz Złotek (Stalowa Wola)

27 February 2015 Match 22	Cracovia	0–0	Lech Poznań	Kraków
20:30 CET (UTC+01:00)		Report		Stadium: Marshal Józef Piłsudski Stadium; Attendance: 9,151; Referee: Paweł Raczkowski (Warsaw)

6 March 2015 Match 23	Lech Poznań	2–0	Jagiellonia Białystok	Poznań
20:30 CET (UTC+01:00)	Douglas 86'; Kędziora 90' (pen.)	Report		Stadium: INEA Stadion; Attendance: 18,523; Referee: Tomasz Musiał (Kraków)

14 March 2015 Match 24	Zawisza Bydgoszcz	1–0	Lech Poznań	Bydgoszcz
18:00 CET (UTC+01:00)	Barišić 33'	Report		Stadium: Zdzisław Krzyszkowiak Stadium; Attendance: 4,893; Referee: Tomasz Kwiatkowski (Warsaw)

22 March 2015 Match 25	Lech Poznań	2–1	Legia Warsaw	Poznań
18:00 CET (UTC+01:00)	Douglas 66'; Hämäläinen 70'	Report	Kucharczyk 84'	Stadium: INEA Stadion; Attendance: 41,545; Referee: Tomasz Musiał (Kraków)

4 April 2015 Match 26	GKS Bełchatów	1–2	Lech Poznań	Bełchatów
18:00 CEST (UTC+02:00)	Wroński 72'	Report	Keita 26'; Arajuuri 74'	Stadium: Stadion Miejski; Attendance: 4,085; Referee: Marcin Borski (Warsaw)

12 April 2015 Match 27	Lech Poznań	1–1	Korona Kielce	Poznań
18:00 CEST (UTC+02:00)	Lovrencsics 58'	Report	Luís Carlos 65'	Stadium: INEA Stadion; Attendance: 24,308; Referee: Jarosław Przybył (Kluczbork)

19 April 2015 Match 28	Górnik Łęczna	1–1	Lech Poznań	Łęczna
15:30 CEST (UTC+02:00)	Rudzik 22'	Report	Sadayev 45'	Stadium: Stadion Górnika; Attendance: 6,143; Referee: Tomasz Musiał (Kraków)

25 April 2015 Match 29	Lech Poznań	2–0	Śląsk Wrocław	Poznań
20:30 CEST (UTC+02:00)	Hämäläinen 56'; Arajuuri 83'	Report		Stadium: INEA Stadion; Attendance: 22,175; Referee: Marcin Borski (Warsaw)

29 April 2015 Match 30	Podbeskidzie Bielsko-Biała	0–2	Lech Poznań	Bielsko-Biała
20:30 CEST (UTC+02:00)		Report	Formella 48'; Hämäläinen 88'	Stadium: Stadion Miejski; Attendance: 5,632; Referee: Szymon Marciniak (Płock)

==== Championship round ====
===== League table =====
Pos	Team	Pld	W	D	L	GF	GA	GD	Pts	Qualification
1	Lech Poznań (C)	37	19	13	5	67	33	+34	43	Qualification to Champions League second qualifying round
2	Legia Warsaw	37	21	7	9	64	33	+31	42	Qualification to Europa League second qualifying round (Note: Legia Warsaw qualifies for Europa League second qualifying round as winners of the 2014–15 Polish Cup and the spot for the runners-up (Europa League first qualifying round) is passed to the fourth placed team.)
3	Jagiellonia Białystok	37	19	8	10	59	44	+15	41	Qualification to Europa League first qualifying round
4	Śląsk Wrocław	37	15	13	9	50	43	+7	35	Qualification to Europa League first qualifying round
5	Lechia Gdańsk	37	13	10	14	45	47	−2	29	
6	Wisła Kraków	37	12	13	12	56	48	+8	28	
7	Górnik Zabrze	37	12	11	14	50	60	−10	26	
8	Pogoń Szczecin	37	11	9	17	45	52	−7	22	

Updated to match(es) played on 3 June 2015. Source: 90minut.pl
Rules for classification: 1) points; 2) points in regular season; 3) head-to-head points in regular season; 4) head-to-head goal difference in regular season; 5) head-to-head away goals scored in regular season (if only two teams); 6) head-to-head goals scored in regular season (if more than two teams); 7) goal difference; 8) number of goals scored; 9) Fair Play table.
(C) Champions

===== Results summary =====
Overall								Home						Away					
Pld	W	D	L	GF	GA	GD	Pts	W	D	L	GF	GA	GD	W	D	L	GF	GA	GD
37	19	13	5	67	33	+34	43	12	5	2	39	14	+25	7	8	3	28	19	+9

Source: 90minut.pl

===== Results by round =====
Round	1	2	3	4	5	6	7
Ground	A	H	H	A	H	A	H
Result	W	L	W	W	W	W	D
Position	1	1	1	1	1	1	1

Source: 90minut.pl
A = Away; H = Home; W = Win; D = Draw; L = Loss

===== Matches =====
Win Draw Loss

9 May 2015 Match 31	Legia Warsaw	1–2	Lech Poznań	Warsaw
15:30 CEST (UTC+02:00)	Vrdoljak 54'	Report	Jevtić 47'; Linetty 49'	Stadium: Polish Army Stadium; Attendance: 25,037; Referee: Szymon Marciniak (Płock)

17 May 2015 Match 32	Lech Poznań	1–3	Jagiellonia Białystok	Poznań
15:30 CEST (UTC+02:00)	Kownacki 52'	Report	Tuszyński 60', 67'; Gajos 82'	Stadium: INEA Stadion; Attendance: 22,515; Referee: Mariusz Złotek (Stalowa Wola)

20 May 2015 Match 33	Lech Poznań	3–0	Śląsk Wrocław	Poznań
18:00 CEST (UTC+02:00)	Kownacki 12'; Pawłowski 17', 28'	Report		Stadium: INEA Stadion; Attendance: 15,377; Referee: Tomasz Musiał (Kraków)

24 May 2015 Match 34	Lechia Gdańsk	1–2	Lech Poznań	Gdańsk
18:00 CEST (UTC+02:00)	Vranješ 90' (pen.)	Report	Hämäläinen 30'; Pawłowski 74'	Stadium: PGE Arena; Attendance: 23,921; Referee: Szymon Marciniak (Płock)

31 May 2015 Match 35	Lech Poznań	1–0	Pogoń Szczecin	Poznań
18:00 CEST (UTC+02:00)	Linetty 45'	Report		Stadium: INEA Stadion; Attendance: 27,538; Referee: Mariusz Złotek (Stalowa Wola)

3 June 2015 Match 36	Górnik Zabrze	1–6	Lech Poznań	Zabrze
20:30 CEST (UTC+02:00)	Nowak 4'	Report	Pawłowski 9'; Hämäläinen 12', 17'; Sadayev 30'; Jevtić 58', 90'	Stadium: Ernest Pohl Stadium; Attendance: 3,000; Referee: Daniel Stefański (Bydgoszcz)

7 June 2015 Match 37	Lech Poznań	0–0	Wisła Kraków	Poznań
18:00 CEST (UTC+02:00)		Report		Stadium: INEA Stadion; Attendance: 41,556; Referee: Szymon Marciniak (Płock)

=== Polish Cup ===
24 September 2014 Round of 32	Lech Poznań	2–0	Wisła Kraków	Poznań
20:45 CEST (UTC+02:00)	Pawłowski 66', 77'	Report		Stadium: INEA Stadion; Attendance: 10,695; Referee: Tomasz Kwiatkowski (Warsaw)

30 October 2014 Round of 16	Lech Poznań	4–2 (a.e.t.)	Jagiellonia Białystok	Poznań
17:45 CET (UTC+01:00)	Sadayev 1'; Linetty 7', 120+1'; Douglas 112'	Report	Gajos 16'; Arajuuri 26' (o.g.)	Stadium: INEA Stadion; Attendance: 10,237; Referee: Marcin Borski (Warsaw)

==== Quarterfinals ====
3 March 2015 First Leg	Znicz Pruszków	1–5	Lech Poznań	Pruszków
18:00 CEST (UTC+02:00)	Jędrych 50'	Report	Linetty 17'; Formella 62'; Sadayev 65', 67'; Keita 90+2'	Stadium: Stadion Znicza; Attendance: 1,940; Referee: Tomasz Wajda (Żywiec)

18 March 2015 Second Leg	Lech Poznań	1–0 (6–1 agg.)	Znicz Pruszków	Poznań
17:45 CET (UTC+01:00)	Formella 89'	Report		Stadium: INEA Stadion; Attendance: 8,273; Referee: Karol Rudziński (Nidzica)

==== Semifinals ====
1 April 2015 First Leg	Błękitni Stargard Szczeciński	3–1	Lech Poznań	Stargard Szczeciński
16:30 CEST (UTC+02:00)	Pustelnik 54', 64'; Kosakiewicz 84'	Report	Sadayev 9'	Stadium: Stadion Miejski; Attendance: 2,500; Referee: Jarosław Przybył (Kluczbork)

9 April 2015 Second Leg	Lech Poznań	5–1 (a.e.t.) (6–4 agg.)	Błękitni Stargard Szczeciński	Poznań
20:45 CEST (UTC+02:00)	Arajuuri 34'; Formella 44'; Kownacki 74', 106'; Hämäläinen 100'	Report	Wojtasiak 19'	Stadium: INEA Stadion; Attendance: 18,461; Referee: Paweł Gil (Lublin)

==== Final ====
2 May 2015 Final	Lech Poznań	1–2	Legia Warsaw	Warsaw
16:00 CEST (UTC+02:00)	Jodłowiec 20' (o.g.)	Report	Jodłowiec 30'; Saganowski 54'	Stadium: Stadion Narodowy; Attendance: 45,322; Referee: Daniel Stefański (Bydgoszcz)

=== UEFA Europa League ===
==== Second qualifying round ====
17 July 2014 First leg	Nõmme Kalju (Estonia)	1–0	(Poland) Lech Poznań	Tallinn, Estonia
18:00 CEST (UTC+2)	Wakui 81'	Report		Stadium: Kadriorg Stadium; Attendance: 2,280; Referee: Domagoj Vučkov (Croatia)

24 July 2014 Second leg	Lech Poznań (Poland)	3–0 (3–1 agg.)	(Estonia) Nõmme Kalju	Poznań, Poland
19:00 CEST (UTC+2)	Kędziora 33'; Hämäläinen 43'; Kownacki 90+3'	Report		Stadium: INEA Stadion; Attendance: 20,263; Referee: Sebastian Colţescu (Romania)

==== Third qualifying round ====
31 July 2014 First leg	Stjarnan (Iceland)	1–0	(Poland) Lech Poznań	Garðabær, Iceland
20:30 CEST (UTC+2)	Toft 48'	Report		Stadium: Stjörnuvöllur; Attendance: 1,000; Referee: Ognjen Valjić (Bosnia and Herzegovina)

7 August 2014 Second leg	Lech Poznań (Poland)	0–0 (0–1 agg.)	(Iceland) Stjarnan	Poznań, Poland
19:00 CEST (UTC+2)		Report		Stadium: INEA Stadion; Attendance: 22,619; Referee: Pavle Radovanović (Montenegro)

== Squad statistics ==
=== Appearances and goals ===
As of end of the 2014–15 season.

No.	Pos	Player	Ekstraklasa		Polish Cup		UEFA Europa League		Total	
No.	Pos	Player	Apps	Goals	Apps	Goals	Apps	Goals	Apps	Goals
Goalkeepers
1	GK	(Bosnia and Herzegovina) Jasmin Burić	11	0	3	0	3	0	17	0
27	GK	(Poland) Krzysztof Kotorowski	6	0	0	0	1	0	7	0
33	GK	(Poland) Maciej Gostomski	20+1	0	4	0	0	0	25	0
36	GK	(Poland) Mateusz Lis	0	0	0	0	0	0	0	0
Defenders
3	DF	(Scotland) Barry Douglas	21+6	3	4+1	1	0+1	0	33	4
4	DF	(Poland) Tomasz Kędziora	35	3	4+1	0	4	1	44	4
5	DF	(Hungary) Tamás Kádár	3+6	0	3	0	0	0	12	0
21	DF	(The Gambia) Kebba Ceesay	0+2	0	3	0	0	0	5	0
23	DF	(Finland) Paulus Arajuuri	24+1	3	4	1	0	0	29	4
25	DF	(Panama) Luis Henríquez	14+2	0	3	0	4	0	23	0
26	DF	(Poland) Maciej Wilusz	7+1	0	0	0	1	0	9	0
34	DF	(Latvia) Antonijs Černomordijs	0	0	0	0	0	0	0	0
35	DF	(Poland) Marcin Kamiński	35+1	2	6	0	3	0	45	2
40	DF	(Poland) Jan Bednarek	1+1	0	0+2	0	0	0	4	0
Midfielders
6	MF	(Poland) Łukasz Trałka	32	0	5	0	4	0	41	0
7	MF	(Poland) Karol Linetty	22+1	2	5	3	1	0	29	5
8	MF	(Poland) Szymon Pawłowski	27+6	9	4+2	2	4	0	43	11
11	MF	(Hungary) Gergő Lovrencsics	20+5	3	1+1	0	3+1	0	31	3
16	MF	(Switzerland) Darko Jevtić	22+7	7	1+3	0	4	0	37	7
17	MF	(Poland) Szymon Drewniak	1+4	0	0+2	0	0	0	7	0
19	MF	(Finland) Kasper Hämäläinen	33+3	13	4	1	4	1	44	15
20	MF	(Hungary) Dávid Holman	0+1	0	1	0	0	0	2	0
22	MF	(Poland) Jakub Serafin	2	0	1	0	0	0	3	0
28	MF	(Poland) Dariusz Formella	8+20	3	3+2	3	0	0	33	6
31	MF	(Poland) Krystian Sanocki	0	0	0+1	0	0	0	1	0
37	MF	(Germany) Niklas Zulciak	0+2	0	0	0	0	0	2	0
77	MF	(Norway) Muhamed Keita	6+13	2	5+1	1	1+2	0	28	3
88	MF	(Cameroon) Arnaud Djoum	3	0	1+1	0	0	0	5	0
Forwards
14	FW	(Serbia) Vojo Ubiparip	5+2	3	1+3	0	3	0	14	3
24	FW	(Poland) Dawid Kownacki	17+13	4	5	2	0+3	1	38	7
95	FW	(Russia) Zaur Sadayev	20+5	5	4+1	4	0	0	30	9
Players away from the club on loan:
Players who appeared for Lech and left the club during the season:
10	FW	(Poland) Łukasz Teodorczyk	3+1	3	0	0	2	0	6	3
20	DF	(Poland) Hubert Wołąkiewicz	9+4	1	2	0	4	0	19	1

=== Goalscorers ===
As of end of the 2014–15 season.

Place	Position	Number	Nation	Name	Ekstraklasa	Polish Cup	UEL	Total
1	MF	19	(Finland)	Kasper Hämäläinen	13	1	1	15
2	MF	8	(Poland)	Szymon Pawłowski	9	2	0	11
3	FW	95	(Russia)	Zaur Sadayev	5	4	0	9
4	MF	16	(Switzerland)	Darko Jevtić	7	0	0	7
4	FW	24	(Poland)	Dawid Kownacki	4	2	1	7
5	MF	28	(Poland)	Dariusz Formella	3	3	0	6
6	MF	7	(Poland)	Karol Linetty	2	3	0	5
7	DF	3	(Scotland)	Barry Douglas	3	1	0	4
7	DF	4	(Poland)	Tomasz Kędziora	3	0	1	4
7	DF	23	(Finland)	Paulus Arajuuri	3	1	0	4
10	FW	10	(Poland)	Łukasz Teodorczyk	3	0	0	3
10	MF	11	(Hungary)	Gergő Lovrencsics	3	0	0	3
10	FW	14	(Serbia)	Vojo Ubiparip	3	0	0	3
10	MF	77	(Norway)	Muhamed Keita	2	1	0	3
14	DF	35	(Poland)	Marcin Kamiński	2	0	0	2
15	DF	20	(Poland)	Hubert Wołąkiewicz	1	0	0	1
Own goal					1	1	0	2
TOTALS					67	19	3	89

=== Clean sheets ===
As of end of the 2014–15 season.

Place	Number	Nation	Name	Ekstraklasa	Polish Cup	UEL	Total
1	33	(Poland)	Maciej Gostomski	6	1	–	7
2	1	(Bosnia and Herzegovina)	Jasmin Burić	3	1	1	5
3	27	(Poland)	Krzysztof Kotorowski	1	–	1	2
4	36	(Poland)	Mateusz Lis	–	–	–	–
TOTALS				10	2	2	14

=== Disciplinary record ===
As of end of the 2014–15 season.

Number	Position	Nation	Name	Ekstraklasa			Polish Cup			UEL			Total		
Number	Position	Nation	Name	Booked	(yellow card) (yellow-red card)	Sent off (straight red)	Booked	(yellow card) (yellow-red card)	Sent off (straight red)	Booked	(yellow card) (yellow-red card)	Sent off (straight red)	Booked	(yellow card) (yellow-red card)	Sent off (straight red)
1	GK	(Bosnia and Herzegovina)	Jasmin Burić	0	0	0	0	0	0	0	0	0	0	0	0
3	DF	(Scotland)	Barry Douglas	8	0	0	0	1	0	0	0	0	8	1	0
4	DF	(Poland)	Tomasz Kędziora	7	0	0	0	0	0	0	0	0	7	0	0
5	DF	(Hungary)	Tamás Kádár	1	0	0	0	0	0	–			1	0	0
6	MF	(Poland)	Łukasz Trałka	10	0	0	3	0	0	1	0	0	14	0	0
7	MF	(Poland)	Karol Linetty	6	0	0	1	0	0	0	0	0	7	0	0
8	MF	(Poland)	Szymon Pawłowski	2	0	0	0	0	0	1	0	0	3	0	0
11	MF	(Hungary)	Gergő Lovrencsics	1	0	0	0	0	0	0	0	0	1	0	0
14	FW	(Serbia)	Vojo Ubiparip	1	0	0	0	0	0	0	0	0	1	0	0
16	MF	(Switzerland)	Darko Jevtić	6	0	0	1	0	0	2	0	0	9	0	0
17	MF	(Poland)	Szymon Drewniak	0	0	0	0	0	0	–			0	0	0
19	MF	(Finland)	Kasper Hämäläinen	1	0	0	0	0	0	0	0	0	1	0	0
20	MF	(Hungary)	Dávid Holman	0	0	0	0	0	0	–			0	0	0
21	DF	(The Gambia)	Kebba Ceesay	0	0	0	0	0	0	–			0	0	0
22	MF	(Poland)	Jakub Serafin	0	0	0	0	0	0	–			0	0	0
23	DF	(Finland)	Paulus Arajuuri	5	0	0	0	0	0	–			5	0	0
24	FW	(Poland)	Dawid Kownacki	3	0	0	1	0	0	1	0	0	5	0	0
25	DF	(Panama)	Luis Henríquez	2	0	0	0	0	0	1	0	0	3	0	0
26	DF	(Poland)	Maciej Wilusz	3	0	0	–			0	0	0	3	0	0
27	GK	(Poland)	Krzysztof Kotorowski	0	0	0	–			0	0	0	0	0	0
28	MF	(Poland)	Dariusz Formella	1	0	1	1	0	0	–			2	0	1
31	MF	(Poland)	Krystian Sanocki	–			0	0	0	–			0	0	0
33	GK	(Poland)	Maciej Gostomski	1	0	0	0	0	0	–			1	0	0
34	DF	(Latvia)	Antonijs Černomordijs	–									0	0	0
35	DF	(Poland)	Marcin Kamiński	2	0	0	1	0	0	0	0	0	3	0	0
36	GK	(Poland)	Mateusz Lis	–									0	0	0
37	MF	(Germany)	Niklas Zulciak	0	0	0	–						0	0	0
40	DF	(Poland)	Jan Bednarek	1	0	0	0	0	0	–			1	0	0
77	MF	(Norway)	Muhamed Keita	2	0	0	1	0	0	0	0	0	3	0	0
88	MF	(Cameroon)	Arnaud Djoum	0	1	0	0	0	0	–			0	1	0
95	FW	(Russia)	Zaur Sadayev	8	0	0	0	1	0	–			8	1	0
Players away from the club on loan:
Players who appeared for Lech and left the club during the season:
10	FW	(Poland)	Łukasz Teodorczyk	2	0	0	–			0	0	0	2	0	0
20	DF	(Poland)	Hubert Wołąkiewicz	1	0	0	1	0	0	0	0	0	2	0	0
TOTALS				74	1	1	10	2	0	6	0	0	90	3	1
