= Marcin Adamski =

Polish footballer (born 1975)

Personal information
- Full name: Marcin Adamski
- Date of birth: 20 August 1975 (age 51)
- Place of birth: Świnoujście, Poland
- Height: 1.87 m (6 ft 2 in)
- Position: Defender

Team information
- Current team: Flota Świnoujście (chairman)

Senior career*
Years	Team	Apps	(Gls)
1995	Flota Świnoujście		
1996	Warta Poznań		
1997–2001	Zagłębie Lubin	100	(1)
2002–2006	Rapid Wien	101	(4)
2005	→ Angers (loan)	4	(0)
2006–2007	Erzgebirge Aue	20	(1)
2007	Ipswich Town (res.)	1	(0)
2007	Northampton Town (res.)	1	(0)
2008–2012	ŁKS Łódź	73	(5)
Total		300	(11)

International career
2003–2005	Poland	3	(0)

Managerial career
- 2020–2021: Flota Świnoujście (assistant)
- 2020: Flota Świnoujście (caretaker)
- 2021–2024: Flota Świnoujście
- * Club domestic league appearances and goals

Marcin Adamski (born 20 August 1975) is a Polish football executive, manager and former player. He is currently the chairman of III liga club Flota Świnoujście.

== Career ==
=== Club ===
In 2002, he joined Austrian side Rapid Wien. In January 2005, he was loaned to French club Angers on a half-year deal.

In June 2005, he extended his deal with Rapid Wien. He was released by the club at the end of the 2005–06 season.

In September 2006, he signed a one-year contract with German club Erzgebirge Aue.

In January 2008, he moved to ŁKS Łódź. Six months later, he extended his contract for four years.

=== International ===
Adamski has made three appearances for the Poland national team.

== Managerial statistics ==
As of match played 24 March 2024

Managerial record by team and tenure
Team	From	To	Record							
Team	From	To	G	W	D	L	GF	GA	GD	Win %
Flota Świnoujście (caretaker)	2 October 2020	9 October 2020	1	1	0	0	2	1	+1	100.00
Flota Świnoujście	5 June 2021	26 March 2024	108	75	12	21	311	114	+197	69.44
Total			109	76	12	21	313	115	+198	69.72

== Honours ==
=== Player ===
ŁKS Łódź

- I liga: 2010–11

=== Manager ===
Flota Świnoujście

- IV liga West Pomerania: 2022–23
