= Krzywicki =

Krzywicki (feminine: Krzywicka; plural: Krzywiccy) is a Polish surname. It comes from toponyms such as Krzywica and Krzywice, both derived from the adjective krzywy.

It may refer to:

- Dick Krzywicki (born 1947), Welsh footballer
- Irena Krzywicka (1899–1994), Polish feminist
- Ludwik Krzywicki (1859–1941), Polish sociologist
- Marcin Krzywicki (born 1986), Polish footballer
- Piotr Krzywicki (1964–2009), Polish politician
