= Sanocki =

Sanocki (feminine: Sanocka; plural: Sanoccy) is a Polish surname. Notable people with this surname include:

- Janusz Sanocki (1954–2020), Polish politician
- Krystian Sanocki (born 1996), Polish footballer
