= Paweł Skrzypek =

Polish footballer

Personal information
- Date of birth: 23 August 1971 (age 55)
- Place of birth: Maków Podhalański, Poland
- Height: 1.74 m (5 ft 9 in)
- Position: Defender

Youth career
- –1986: Płomień Jerzmanowice

Senior career*
Years	Team	Apps	(Gls)
1986–1995	CKS Czeladź		
1995–1996	Raków Częstochowa	68	(7)
1997–2000	Legia Warsaw	53	(2)
2000–2002	Pogoń Szczecin	38	(1)
2002–2005	Amica Wronki	98	(0)
2006–2007	Flota Świnoujście		
2007–2009	Pogoń Szczecin		
2009–2010	Drawa Drawsko Pomorskie		
2011	Victoria 95 Przecław		
2012–2017	Polonia Falcons		

International career
1996–1997	Poland	10	(0)

Managerial career
- 2006–2007: Flota Świnoujście (player-manager)
- 2009–2010: Drawa Drawsko Pomorskie (player-manager)
- 2011: Victoria 95 Przecław (player-manager)
- Olimpia Stockholm
- * Club domestic league appearances and goals

Paweł Skrzypek (born 23 August 1971) is a Polish former professional footballer who played as a defender.

== Honours ==
Legia Warsaw

- Polish Cup: 1996–97
- Polish Super Cup: 1997

Pogoń Szczecin

- IV liga West Pomerania: 2007–08
