= Maciej Górski (footballer) =

Polish footballer (born 1990)

Personal information
- Full name: Maciej Górski
- Date of birth: 1 March 1990 (age 36)
- Place of birth: Warsaw, Poland
- Height: 1.83 m (6 ft 0 in)
- Position: Forward

Team information
- Current team: KSZO Ostrowiec Świętokrzyski

Youth career
- Mazowsze Miętne
- 2004: Agrykola Warsaw
- 2005–2006: KS Piaseczno
- 2006–2008: Amica Wronki

Senior career*
| Years | Team | Apps | (Gls) |
| 2008–2012 | Legia Warsaw (ME) | 61 | (28) |
| 2010–2012 | Legia Warsaw | 4 | (0) |
| 2010–2011 | → GKP Gorzów Wlkp. (loan) | 18 | (2) |
| 2012–2013 | Arka Gdynia | 10 | (0) |
| 2013–2014 | Sandecja Nowy Sącz | 34 | (2) |
| 2014–2015 | Znicz Pruszków | 33 | (15) |
| 2015–2016 | Chrobry Głogów | 28 | (15) |
| 2016–2018 | Jagiellonia Białystok | 10 | (1) |
| 2017 | → Korona Kielce (loan) | 25 | (3) |
| 2018 | → Chojniczanka Chojnice (loan) | 13 | (2) |
| 2018–2019 | Korona Kielce | 15 | (2) |
| 2019–2020 | Radomiak Radom | 30 | (2) |
| 2020–2022 | Pogoń Siedlce | 51 | (25) |
| 2022–2024 | Resovia | 71 | (21) |
| 2025–2026 | Podbeskidzie Bielsko-Biała | 42 | (7) |
| 2026– | KSZO Ostrowiec Świętokrzyski | 0 | (0) |

International career
| 2010 | Poland U21 | 1 | (0) |
- * Club domestic league appearances and goals as of 14:45, 6 June 2026 (UTC)

Maciej Górski (born 1 March 1990) is a Polish professional footballer who plays as a forward for III liga club KSZO Ostrowiec Świętokrzyski.

== Career ==
=== Youth career ===
Górski spent time at several different clubs during his youth, including Mazowsze Mietne, Agrykola Warsaw, KS Piasecano, and Amica Wronki.

=== Legia Warsaw ===
Górski joined Legia Warsaw from Amica Wronki in 2008. He spent two years with the B-Team before being promoted to the senior squad in January 2010.

=== GKP Gorzow (Loan) ===
In the summer of 2010, he was loaned to GKP Gorzów Wlkp. from Legia Warsaw. His league debut for the club came on 29 August 2010 in a 2–1 victory over Termalica Nieciecza. Unfortunately, he would be subbed off injured in the 25th minute, and Adam Banasiak would take his spot. Gorski made 18 appearances on his loan, scoring twice. The first of those came in the 74th minute of a 2–1 loss to Górnik Łęczna, the other in the 17th minute of a 3–2 loss to Kluczbork.

=== Arka Gdynia ===
In the summer of 2012, Górski was sold to Arka Gdynia on a free transfer. He made his league debut for Arka on 4 August 2012 in a 2–0 win over Warta Poznań. He was replaced by Dariusz Formella in the 89th minute. He spent a little less than a year at the club, playing ten times in the league, but never scoring.

=== Sandecja ===
In March 2013, he was sold to Sandecja. He made his league debut for Sandecja on 9 March 2013 in a 3–1 loss to Zawisza Bydgoszcz. He came on in the 54th minute, replacing goal scorer Piotr Giel. He stayed a little over a year there, scoring twice in 34 appearances. The first of those goals came on 30 March 2013 in a 3–0 win over Polonia Bytom. His goal, the third of the match, came in the 80th minute, just ten minutes after he had been brought on for Patryk Tuszyński.

=== Znicz Pruszków ===
In July 2014, Górski was sold again to Znicz Pruszków. He made his league debut for the club on 2 August 2014 in a 3–0 victory over Nadwiślan Góra. He made an immediate impact with his new club, scoring his first goal in the 6th minute of this match. He spent about a year there as well scoring 15 goals in 33 games.

=== Chrobry Głogów ===
In July 2015, he left for Chrobry Głogów. He made his league debut for the club on 1 August 2015 in a 2–0 victory over MKS Kluczbork, scoring both of the goals. The goals came in the 62nd and 90th minutes. He stayed about a year at Glogow as well, scoring 15 goals in only 28 games, which was his most prolific season to that point. He scored his first professional hat-trick on 21 November 2015, also against Kluczbork. His goals came in the 16th, 76th, and 80th minutes.

=== Jagiellonia ===
Górski's scoring abilities caught the eye of Jagiellonia, who brought him in in July 2016 on a free transfer. He made his league debut on 16 July 2016 in a 1–1 draw with Legia Warsaw, coming on for Karol Mackiewicz. However, he only made 10 appearances for the club, scoring once. That goal came on 23 July 2016 in a 4–1 victory over Ruch Chorzów. His goal came in the 17th minute.

=== Korona Kielce (loan) ===
In January 2017, Górski was loaned out to Korona Kielce. In 25 games for Kielce, he scored three goals. His league debut came on 11 February 2017 in a 2–0 loss to Wisła Kraków, coming on for Nabil Aankour in the 80th minute. His first league goal came a little over a month later in a 3–0 victory over Cracovia. The goal came in the 86th minute, just nine minutes after he had been subbed on for Iliyan Mitsanski.

=== Chojniczanka Chojnice (loan) ===
In January 2018, Górski was loaned out to Chojniczanka Chojnice.

=== Radomiak Radom ===
On 12 June 2019, Górski joined Radomiak Radom on a 1-year contract.

=== Pogoń Siedlce ===
On 7 September 2020, he signed a two-year contract with Pogoń Siedlce.

=== Resovia ===
On 24 June 2022, Górski moved to I liga side Resovia on a one-year deal. On 8 November 2024, in a post-match interview after a 3–1 II liga win over Wisła Puławy, Górski spoke about Resovia's financial and organizational issues, stating his uncertainty whether the club would contest the spring round, and that he and his teammates had not once received their salaries on time since he joined Resovia. His claims were denied by the club in an official statement the following day. Górski and Resovia agreed to part ways later that month, on 30 November.

=== Podbeskidzie ===
On 10 January 2025, he joined fellow third-tier club Podbeskidzie Bielsko-Biała on a deal until June 2026.

=== KSZO Ostrowiec Świętokrzyski ===
On 27 June 2026, Górski moved to the fourth division to join KSZO Ostrowiec Świętokrzyski. He signed a one-year contract with an option to extend.

== Honours ==
Legia Warsaw

- Polish Cup: 2011–12

Legia Warsaw II

- Polish Cup (Masovia regionals): 2011–12

Individual

- Polish Cup top scorer: 2014–15
