= Karol Linetty =

Polish footballer (born 1995)

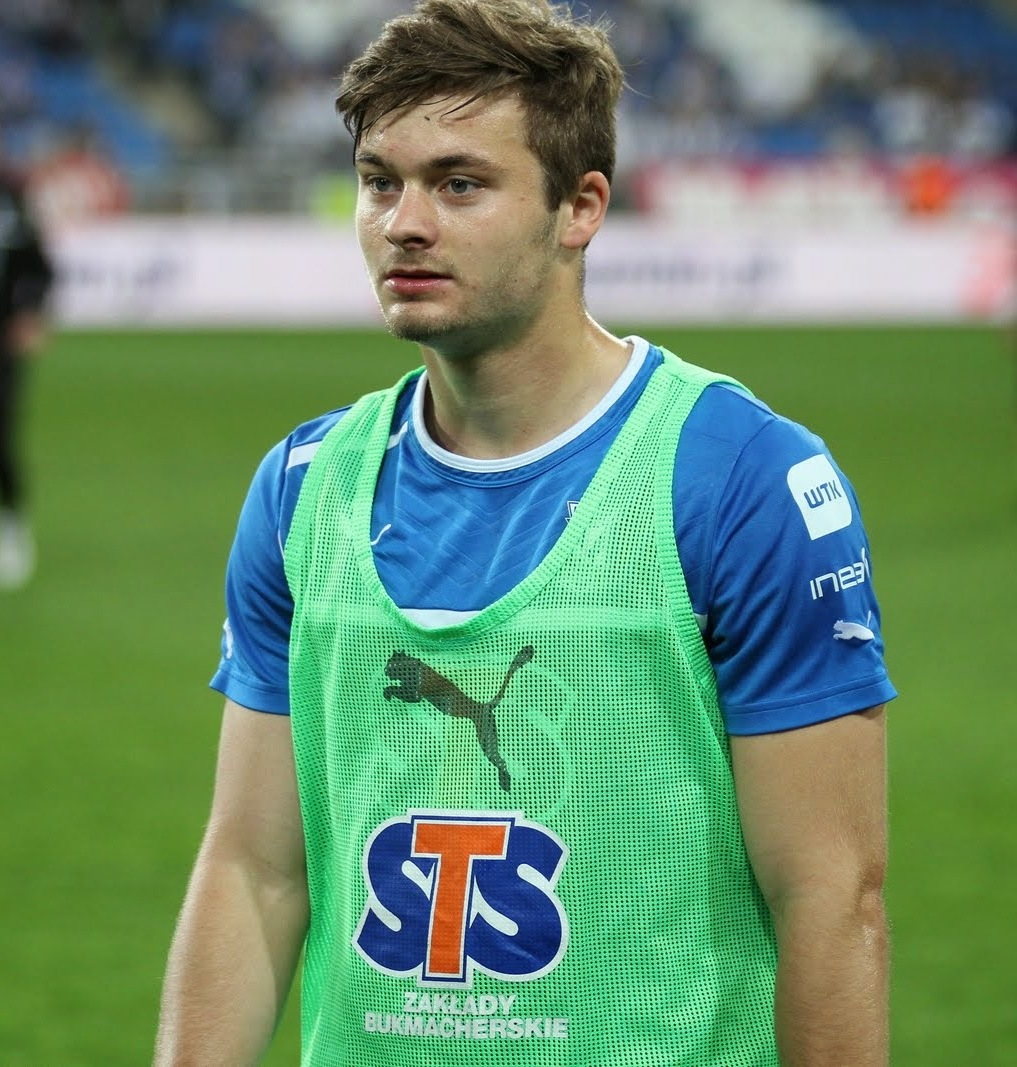
- Linetty with Lech Poznań in 2014

Personal information
- Full name: Karol Linetty
- Date of birth: 2 February 1995 (age 31)
- Place of birth: Żnin, Poland
- Height: 1.76 m (5 ft 9 in)
- Position: Midfielder

Team information
- Current team: Śląsk Wrocław
- Number: 17

Youth career
- 2006: Sokół Damasławek
- 2006–2012: Lech Poznań

Senior career*
Years	Team	Apps	(Gls)
2012–2016	Lech Poznań	93	(6)
2016–2020	Sampdoria	124	(11)
2020–2025	Torino	131	(3)
2025–2026	Kocaelispor	25	(0)
2026–	Śląsk Wrocław	0	(0)

International career
2010	Poland U15	4	(0)
2011–2012	Poland U17	12	(1)
2012	Poland U19	6	(0)
2013–2017	Poland U21	8	(0)
2014–2023	Poland	47	(5)
- * Club domestic league appearances and goals as of 19:43, 1 June 2026 (UTC)

Karol Linetty ([ˈkarɔl liˈnɛttɨ]; born 2 February 1995) is a Polish professional footballer who plays as a midfielder for Ekstraklasa club Śląsk Wrocław.

Linetty began his professional playing career at Lech Poznań. He joined Italian side Sampdoria in July 2016 and made over 100 appearances for the club, before moving to Torino in September 2020. After spending nine years in Italy, he signed for Turkish side Kocaelispor in mid-2025. In 2026, he returned to Poland with Śląsk Wrocław.

== Club career ==
=== Lech Poznań ===
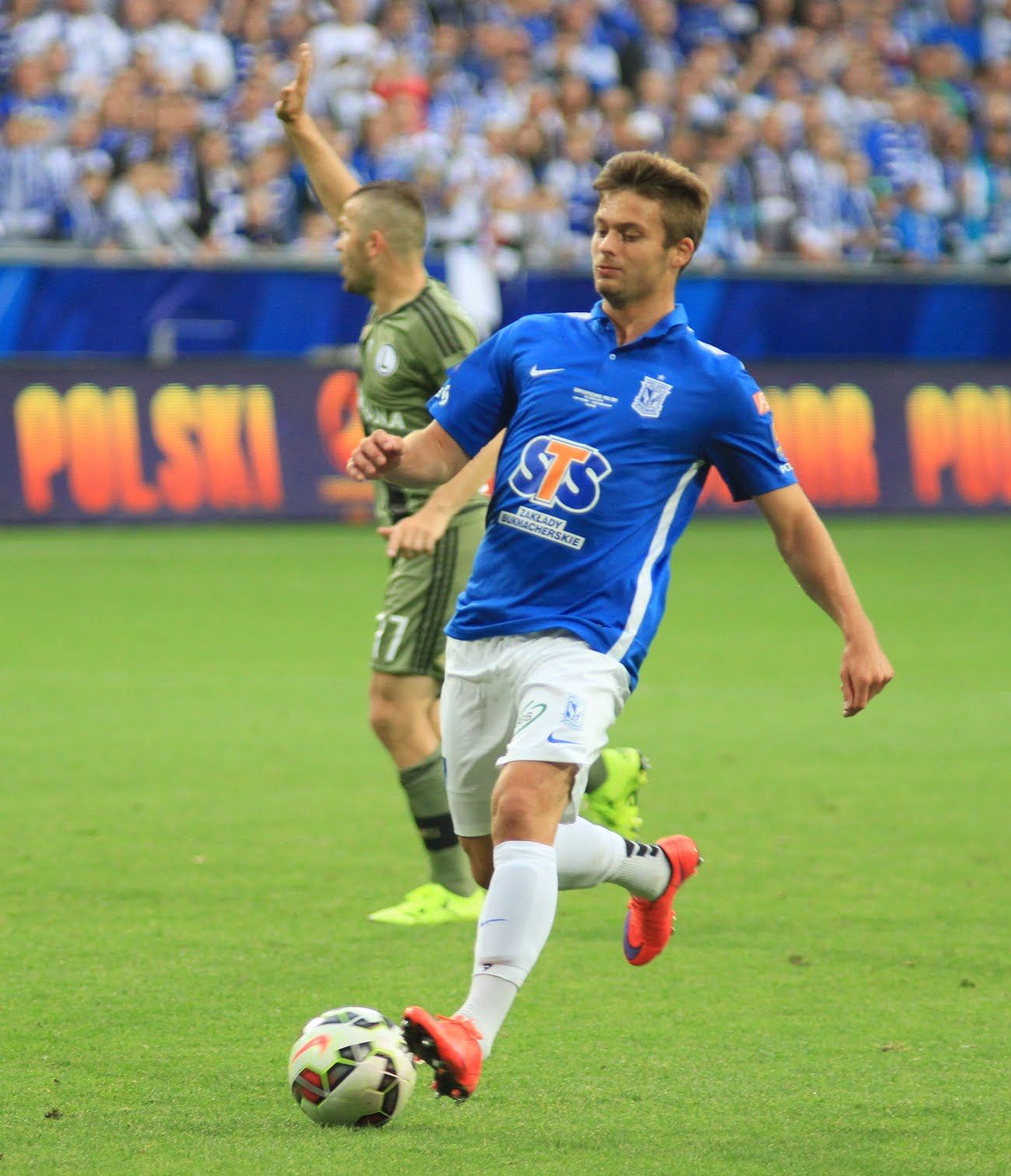
Linetty in 2015

Linetty was called up to the first team of Lech Poznań in 2012. He made his debut on 2 November 2012, as a substitute for Szymon Drewniak in the 60th minute against Wisła Kraków.

=== Italy ===
In July 2016, Linetty moved to Serie A club Sampdoria and signed a five-year contract with the club.

In September 2020, Linetty signed for Torino for a reported fee of €7.5 million on a four-year contract. On 13 November 2023, he scored his first goal for the club against Roma in the 55th minute. On 3 January 2024, Linetty extended his contract with Torino until 30 June 2025.

Linetty left Torino at the end of his contract in June 2025.

=== Kocaelispor ===
On 14 August 2025, Linetty signed a season-long deal with recently promoted Süper Lig club Kocaelispor. In July 2026, shortly after Linetty exercised his option to extend his contract, he left the club by mutual consent.

=== Śląsk Wrocław ===
On 30 August 2026, after ten years abroad, Linetty returned to Poland and signed a two-year deal with Ekstraklasa club Śląsk Wrocław.

== International career ==
Linetty debuted for the Polish senior squad on 18 January 2014 against Norway, scoring a goal which eventually resulted in a 3–0 victory for Poland. He was later selected for the UEFA Euro 2016.

In June 2018, Linetty was named in Poland's 23-man squad for the 2018 FIFA World Cup in Russia.

== Career statistics ==
=== Club ===
As of match played 17 May 2026

Appearances and goals by club, season and competition
Club	Season	League			National cup (Note: Includes Polish Cup, Coppa Italia)		Europe		Other		Total	
Club	Season	Division	Apps	Goals	Apps	Goals	Apps	Goals	Apps	Goals	Apps	Goals
Lech Poznań	2012–13	Ekstraklasa	14	0	—		—		—		14	0
Lech Poznań	2013–14	Ekstraklasa	28	1	—		—		—		28	1
Lech Poznań	2014–15	Ekstraklasa	23	2	5	3	1 (Note: Appearance(s) in UEFA Europa League)	0	—		29	5
Lech Poznań	2015–16	Ekstraklasa	28	3	3	0	9 (Note: Three appearances in UEFA Champions League, six appearances and one goal in UEFA Europa League)	1	1 (Note: Appearance in Polish Super Cup)	1	41	5
Lech Poznań	Total		93	6	8	3	10	1	1	1	112	11
Sampdoria	2016–17	Serie A	35	1	3	0	—		—		38	1
Sampdoria	2017–18	Serie A	29	3	0	0	—		—		29	3
Sampdoria	2018–19	Serie A	32	3	3	0	—		—		35	3
Sampdoria	2019–20	Serie A	28	4	2	0	—		—		30	4
Sampdoria	Total		124	11	8	0	—		—		132	11
Torino	2020–21	Serie A	27	1	3	0	—		—		30	1
Torino	2021–22	Serie A	16	0	2	0	—		—		18	0
Torino	2022–23	Serie A	32	1	3	0	—		—		35	1
Torino	2023–24	Serie A	28	0	1	0	—		—		29	0
Torino	2024–25	Serie A	28	1	2	0	—		—		30	1
Torino	Total		131	3	11	0	—		—		142	3
Kocaelispor	2025–26	Süper Lig	25	0	3	0	—		—		28	0
Career total			373	20	30	3	10	1	1	1	414	25

=== International ===
As of match played 10 September 2023

Appearances and goals by national team and year
National team	Year	Apps	Goals
Poland	2014	5	1
Poland	2015	4	0
Poland	2016	4	0
Poland	2017	5	0
Poland	2018	5	0
Poland	2019	0	0
Poland	2020	7	1
Poland	2021	10	3
Poland	2022	2	0
Poland	2023	5	0
Total		47	5

Scores and results list Poland's goal tally first, score column indicates score after each Linetty goal.

List of international goals scored by Karol Linetty
No.	Date	Venue	Opponent	Score	Result	Competition
1	18 January 2014	Zayed Sports City Stadium, Abu Dhabi, United Arab Emirates	Norway	3–0	3–0	Friendly
2	14 October 2020	Stadion Miejski, Wrocław, Poland	Bosnia and Herzegovina	2–0	3–0	2020–21 UEFA Nations League A
3	14 June 2021	Krestovsky Stadium, Saint Petersburg, Russia	Slovakia	1–1	1–2	UEFA Euro 2020
4	2 September 2021	Stadion Narodowy, Warsaw, Poland	Albania	4–1	4–1	2022 FIFA World Cup qualification
5	5 September 2021	San Marino Stadium, Serravalle, San Marino	San Marino	4–0	7–1	2022 FIFA World Cup qualification

== Honours ==
Lech Poznań

- Ekstraklasa: 2014–15
- Polish Super Cup: 2015

Individual

- Polish Newcomer of the Year: 2014
