= Emil Wrażeń =

Polish footballer

Personal information
- Date of birth: 21 February 1992 (age 34)
- Place of birth: Radom, Poland
- Height: 1.87 m (6 ft 2 in)
- Position: Striker

Youth career
- Junior Radom
- –2009: KS Piaseczno

Senior career*
Years	Team	Apps	(Gls)
2009–2011	KS Piaseczno	35+	(7+)
2011	→ Widzew Łódź (ME) (loan)		
2011–2013	Widzew Łódź	1	(0)
2012	→ Ruch Radzionków (loan)	0	(0)
2012–2013	→ Dolcan Ząbki (loan)	1	(0)
2013	→ GKP Targówek (loan)	5	(1)
2013–2016	Sparta Jazgarzew		
2016–2017	KS Konstancin		
2017–2019	MKS Piaseczno		
2019–2020	Jedność Żabieniec		
- * Club domestic league appearances and goals

Emil Wrażeń (born 21 February 1992) is a Polish former professional footballer who played as a striker.

== Career ==
After making over 31 league appearances and seven goals with KS Piaseczno in the Polish fourth division, Wrażeń signed for Widzew Łódź in the top flight. However, despite making a league appearance with the club, he left after two unsuccessful loans with Ruch Radzionków and Dolcan Ząbki in the lower leagues.

In 2012, he signed for GKP Targówek in the fourth division, where he was accused of faking injury and placed with the reserves.

Despite receiving many offers after scoring 28 goals in the fifth division with Sparta Jazgarzew, Wrażeń decided to stay put due to having a secure job.

He was tied with four players as the top scorer of the 2014–15 Polish Cup.

== Honours ==
Individual

- Polish Cup top scorer: 2014–15
