= Radosław Wiśniewski =

Polish footballer (born 1992)

Personal information
- Full name: Radosław Sebastian Wiśniewski
- Date of birth: 10 September 1992 (age 34)
- Place of birth: Kamień Pomorski, Poland
- Height: 1.72 m (5 ft 7 1/2 in)
- Position: Forward

Team information
- Current team: Prawobrzeże Świnoujście
- Number: 8

Youth career
- 2004–2005: Gryf Kamień Pomorski
- 2005–2006: Iskra Golczewo
- 2006–2009: Ina Goleniów

Senior career*
Years	Team	Apps	(Gls)
2009–2011	Ina Goleniów		
2011–2014	Pogoń Szczecin	19	(0)
2011	→ Bałtyk Gdynia (loan)	9	(1)
2014	→ Lorca FC (loan)	1	(1)
2014	Ina Goleniów	11	(8)
2015–2018	Błękitni Stargard	39	(5)
2018–2020	Vineta Wolin	34	(12)
2021–2022	Iskra Golczewo	31	(33)
2022–2024	OKS Goleniów	53	(26)
2024–	Prawobrzeże Świnoujście	28	(12)
- * Club domestic league appearances and goals as of 18:46, 24 June 2025 (UTC)

Radosław Wiśniewski (born 10 September 1992) is a Polish footballer who plays as a striker for regional league club Prawobrzeże Świnoujście. Besides Poland, he has played in Spain.

== Career ==
Born in Kamień Pomorski, Wiśniewski went through the youth departments of hometown club Gryf and Iskra Golczewo before being scouted for the Ina Goleniów academy. After two seasons in the first team, he was signed by Pogoń Szczecin in February 2011, playing two league matches in his first half season for the club.
