= Harrison Omoko =

Nigerian footballer

Harrison Omokoh
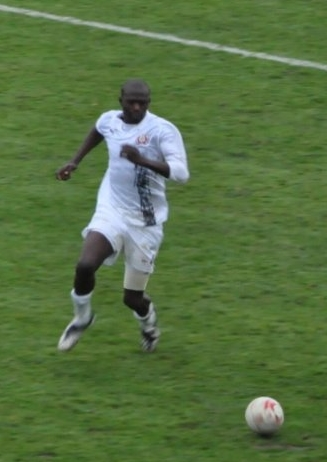

Personal information
- Full name: Harrison Orovianor Omokoh
- Date of birth: 12 December 1981 (age 44)
- Place of birth: Warri, Nigeria
- Height: 1.95 m (6 ft 5 in)
- Position: Defender

Team information
- Current team: MKS Kotwica Kołobrzeg II (head coach)

Youth career
- Bendel Insurance
- Plateau United

Senior career*
Years	Team	Apps	(Gls)
2000–2003	Dynamo Kyiv	0	(0)
2001–2002	→ Dynamo-2 Kyiv	46	(0)
2001	→ Dynamo-3 Kyiv	1	(0)
2001	→ Hapoel Be'er Sheva (loan)	0	(0)
2002	→ Arsenal Kyiv (loan)	1	(0)
2003–2004	Vorskla Poltava	40	(6)
2004–2005	Volyn Lutsk	38	(0)
2006–2008	Tavriya Simferopol	41	(0)
2008–2010	Zorya Luhansk	40	(0)
2010–2011	Volyn Lutsk	10	(0)
2016–2018	Arsenal-Kyivshchyna Bila Tserkva	43	(3)

International career
1999	Nigeria	1	(0)

Managerial career
- 2026–: MKS Kotwica Kołobrzeg II
- * Club domestic league appearances and goals

Harrison Orovianor Omokoh (born 12 December 1981) is a Nigerian football manager and former professional player. He is currently in charge of MKS Kotwica Kołobrzeg II along with Łukasz Kosakiewicz.
