= Nikodem Fiedosewicz =

Polish footballer (born 1998)

Personal information
- Full name: Nikodem Fiedosewicz
- Date of birth: 30 May 1998 (age 28)
- Place of birth: Grodzisk Wielkopolski, Poland
- Height: 1.74 m (5 ft 9 in)
- Positions: Left-back; winger

Team information
- Current team: Obra Zbąszyn
- Number: 20

Youth career
- –2011: Grom Wolsztyn
- 2011–2014: Warta Poznań

Senior career*
Years	Team	Apps	(Gls)
2014–2022	Warta Poznań	110	(0)
2019	→ KKS 1925 Kalisz (loan)	12	(0)
2022	→ Pogoń Siedlce (loan)	5	(0)
2022–2023	Pogoń Siedlce	23	(0)
2023–2024	Wikęd Luzino	23	(2)
2024–2026	Błękitni Stargard	44	(2)
2026–	Obra Zbąszyn	1	(0)
- * Club domestic league appearances and goals as of 19:50, 5 September 2026 (UTC)

Nikodem Fiedosewicz (born 30 May 1998) is a Polish professional footballer who plays as a left-back or left midfielder for V liga Greater Poland club Obra Zbąszyn.

== Career statistics ==
As of match played 5 September 2026

Appearances and goals by club, season and competition
Club	Season	League			Polish Cup		Other		Total	
Club	Season	Division	Apps	Goals	Apps	Goals	Apps	Goals	Apps	Goals
Warta Poznań	2014–15	III liga, gr. C	17	0	—		2 (Note: Appearances in III liga promotion play-offs)	0	19	0
Warta Poznań	2015–16	III liga, gr. C	22	0	—		1	0	23	0
Warta Poznań	2016–17	II liga	25	0	—		—		25	0
Warta Poznań	2017–18	II liga	20	0	1	0	—		21	0
Warta Poznań	2018–19	I liga	12	0	0	0	—		12	0
Warta Poznań	2019–20	I liga	8	0	1	0	—		9	0
Warta Poznań	2020–21	Ekstraklasa	0	0	1	0	—		1	0
Warta Poznań	2021–22	Ekstraklasa	3	0	1	0	—		4	0
Warta Poznań	Total		107	0	4	0	3	0	114	0
KKS 1925 Kalisz (loan)	2018–19	III liga, gr. II	12	0	—		—		12	0
Pogoń Siedlce (loan)	2021–22	II liga	5	0	—		—		5	0
Pogoń Siedlce	2022–23	II liga	23	0	4	2	—		27	2
Wikęd Luzino	2023–24	III liga, gr. II	23	2	—		—		23	2
Błękitni Stargard	2024–25	III liga, gr. II	27	2	—		2 (Note: Appearances in II liga relegation play-offs)	0	29	2
Błękitni Stargard	2025–26	III liga, gr. II	15	0	—		—		15	0
Błękitni Stargard	Total		42	2	—		2	0	44	2
Obra Zbąszyn	2026–27	V liga Gr. Pol.	1	0	—		—		1	0
Career total			213	4	8	2	5	0	226	6

== Honours ==
Warta Poznań

- III liga Kuyavia-Pomerania–Greater Poland: 2014–15, 2015–16
