= Charles Nwaogu =

Nigerian footballer (born 1990)

Personal information
- Full name: Charles Uchenna Nwaogu
- Date of birth: 22 July 1990 (age 36)
- Place of birth: Osogu, Nigeria
- Height: 1.77 m (5 ft 10 in)
- Position: Striker

Youth career
- 2006: Polonia Warsaw

Senior career*
Years	Team	Apps	(Gls)
2007–2008	Znicz Pruszków		
2008–2009	Odra Opole	26	(1)
2009–2011	Flota Świnoujście	61	(28)
2011	Energie Cottbus	0	(0)
2012	Arka Gdynia	13	(2)
2013	Flota Świnoujście	26	(6)
2014	Podbeskidzie Bielsko-Biała	3	(0)
2014–2015	Flota Świnoujście	20	(3)
2015	Żyrardowianka Żyrardów	5	(3)
2016	Bytovia Bytów	4	(1)
2016	Gryf Kamień Pomorski	0	(0)
2017–2018	Świt Szczecin	36	(8)
2018	Hutnik Szczecin	13	(3)
2019	Świt Szczecin	11	(1)
2019	Hutnik Szczecin	16	(9)
2020	Sparta Węgorzyno	17	(11)
2021–2022	Vielgovia Szczecin	25	(26)
2022	Sparta Węgorzyno	3	(4)
- * Club domestic league appearances and goals

Charles Uchenna Nwaogu (born 22 July 1990) is a Nigerian former professional footballer who played as a striker.

== Early life ==
Nwaogu was born in 1990 in Nigeria. He joined the youth academy of Polish side Polonia Warsaw at the age of fifteen.

== Career ==
In 2009, Nwaogu signed for Polish side Flota Świnoujście. He was the top scorer of the 2010–11 I liga with twenty goals.

== Personal life ==
Nwaogu has been nicknamed "Charlie". After retiring from professional football, he worked in the music industry.

== Honours ==
Individual

- I liga top scorer: 2010–11
