= 2010–11 I liga =

I liga
- Season: 2010–11
- Champions: ŁKS Łódź
- Promoted: ŁKS Łódź; Podbeskidzie Bielsko-Biała
- Relegated: MKS Kluczbork; KSZO Ostrowiec Świętokrzyski; Odra Wodzisław; GKP Gorzów Wielkopolski
- Matches: 306
- Goals: 750 (2.45 per match)
- Top goalscorer: Charles Nwaogu (20 goals)
- Biggest home win: Piast 5–0 GKP (23 October 2010)
- Biggest away win: Katowice 1–6 Podbeskidzie (28 August 2010)
- Highest scoring: Odra 3–6 ŁKS (21 May 2011)
- Longest winning run: ŁKS Łódź (7 games)
- Longest unbeaten run: ŁKS Łódź; Piast Gliwice (13 games)
- Longest winless run: GKP Gorzów Wielkopolski (10 games)
- Longest losing run: Dolcan Ząbki (8 games)
- Highest attendance: 19,000; Warta 2–1 Katowice (20 March 2011)
- Lowest attendance: 300; Górnik P. 1–2 Flota (20 May 2011)
- Average attendance: 2,061 ▼34.8%

The 2010–11 I liga was the 63rd season of the second tier domestic division in the Polish football league system since its establishment in 1949 and the 3rd season of the Polish I liga under its current title. The league was operated by the Polish Football Association (PZPN).

The league is contested by 18 teams who competing for promotion to the 2011–12 Ekstraklasa. The regular season was played in a round-robin tournament. The champions and runners-up would receive promotion. The bottom four teams were automatically demoted to the II liga.

== Teams ==
Location of teams in 2010–11 I liga
Location of teams in the Metropolis GZM

Relegated from 2009–10 Ekstraklasa:

- Odra Wodzisław
- Piast Gliwice

2009–10 I liga teams remaining in the league:

- Dolcan Ząbki
- Flota Świnoujście
- GKS Katowice
- GKP Gorzów Wielkopolski
- Górnik Łęczna
- KSZO Ostrowiec Świętokrzyski
- ŁKS Łódź
- MKS Kluczbork
- Podbeskidzie Bielsko-Biała
- Pogoń Szczecin
- Sandecja Nowy Sącz
- Warta Poznań

Promoted from 2009–10 II liga:

- Ruch Radzionków
- Górnik Polkowice
- LKS Nieciecza
- Kolejarz Stróże

== League table ==
Pos	Team	Pld	W	D	L	GF	GA	GD	Pts	Promotion or relegation
1	ŁKS Łódź (P)	34	20	11	3	59	34	+25	71	Promotion to Ekstraklasa
2	Podbeskidzie Bielsko-Biała (P)	34	20	9	5	53	23	+30	69	Promotion to Ekstraklasa
3	Flota Świnoujście	34	19	9	6	58	34	+24	66	
4	Sandecja Nowy Sącz	34	15	11	8	52	34	+18	56	
5	Piast Gliwice	34	13	13	8	45	31	+14	52	
6	Pogoń Szczecin	34	14	9	11	55	42	+13	51	
7	Warta Poznań	34	14	8	12	44	43	+1	50 (Note: WPO 1−1 GÓŁ; GÓŁ 0−1 WPO)	
8	Górnik Łęczna	34	14	8	12	44	39	+5	50	
9	Ruch Radzionków	34	13	7	14	34	32	+2	46	
10	Górnik Polkowice	34	12	6	16	31	39	−8	42	
11	GKS Katowice	34	10	11	13	47	57	−10	41	
12	Kolejarz Stróże	34	10	8	16	30	43	−13	38	
13	Dolcan Ząbki	34	10	7	17	33	39	−6	37 (Note: LKS 1−0 DOL; DOL 5−1 LKS)	
14	Nieciecza	34	10	7	17	40	53	−13	37	
15	MKS Kluczbork (R)	34	8	12	14	36	44	−8	36 (Note: MKS 1−1 KSZO; KSZO 2−2 MKS)	Relegation to II liga
16	KSZO Ostrowiec Świętokrzyski (R)	34	9	9	16	32	43	−11	36	Relegation to II liga
17	Odra Wodzisław (R)	34	9	5	20	29	58	−29	32	Relegation to II liga
18	GKP Gorzów Wielkopolski (Note: GKP Gorzów Wielkopolski has been withdrawn after matchday 28.)	34	7	8	19	28	62	−34	29	

Rules for classification: 1) points; 2) head-to-head points; 3) head-to-head goal difference; 4) head-to-head goals scored; 5) goal difference; 6) number of goals scored.
(P) Promoted; (R) Relegated

== Season statistics ==
=== Top scorers ===
Rank	Player	Club	Goals
1	(Nigeria) Charles Nwaogu	Flota Świnoujście	20
2	(Poland) Arkadiusz Aleksander	Sandecja Nowy Sącz	15
3	(Poland) Marcin Mięciel	ŁKS Łódź	13
4	(Poland) Adam Cieśliński	Podbeskidzie Bielsko-Biała	12
5	(Poland) Emil Drozdowicz	GKP Gorzów Wielkopolski	11
5	(Poland) Łukasz Cichos	LKS Nieciecza	11
5	(Poland) Jakub Kosecki	ŁKS Łódź	11
8	(Poland) Zbigniew Zakrzewski	Warta Poznań	10
8	(Poland) Jakub Biskup	Piast Gliwice	10
8	(Poland) Andrzej Rybski	LKS Nieciecza	10

== See also ==
- 2010–11 Ekstraklasa
- 2010–11 Polish Cup
