= Sebastian Bartlewski =

Polish footballer (born 1994)

Personal information
- Full name: Sebastian Bartlewski
- Date of birth: 13 June 1994 (age 32)
- Place of birth: Gdynia, Poland
- Height: 1.72 m (5 ft 8 in)
- Position: Attacking midfielder

Team information
- Current team: Stolem Gniewino
- Number: 61

Youth career
- 2002–2003: UKS Cisowa Gdynia
- 2003–2013: Arka Gdynia

Senior career*
Years	Team	Apps	(Gls)
2013	Arka Gdynia II	6	(2)
2013–2015	Podbeskidzie Bielsko-Biała	14	(0)
2015	→ Dolcan Ząbki (loan)	9	(0)
2016	→ Olimpia Grudziądz (loan)	12	(0)
2016–2017	Kotwica Kołobrzeg	32	(2)
2017–2020	Bałtyk Gdynia	76	(10)
2021–2022	Olimpia Elbląg	15	(1)
2022–2023	Stolem Gniewino	13	(2)
2023	Bałtyk Gdynia	1	(0)
2023	Wikęd Luzino	6	(1)
2024–	Stolem Gniewino	39	(8)

International career
	Poland U17	3	(0)
- * Club domestic league appearances and goals as of 26 June 2026

Sebastian Bartlewski (born 13 June 1994) is a Polish professional footballer who plays as an attacking midfielder for IV liga Pomerania club Stolem Gniewino.
