= Łukasz Kosakiewicz =

Polish footballer

Personal information
- Date of birth: 19 September 1990 (age 36)
- Place of birth: Szczecin, Poland
- Height: 1.76 m (5 ft 9 in)
- Position: Right-back

Team information
- Current team: MKS Kotwica Kołobrzeg

Youth career
- Energetyk Gryfino

Senior career*
| Years | Team | Apps | (Gls) |
| 2008–2009 | Energetyk Gryfino | | |
| 2009–2011 | Rega Trzebiatów | 45 | (1) |
| 2011 | Czarni Żagań | 12 | (0) |
| 2011–2012 | Energetyk Gryfino | | |
| 2013 | Hetman Grzybno | | |
| 2013–2014 | Drawa Drawsko Pomorskie | 17 | (2) |
| 2014–2015 | Błękitni Stargard | 42 | (4) |
| 2015–2017 | Chojniczanka Chojnice | 58 | (9) |
| 2017–2019 | Korona Kielce | 54 | (1) |
| 2019–2021 | Widzew Łódź | 60 | (0) |
| 2021–2022 | Znicz Pruszków | 12 | (2) |
| 2022–2023 | Sandecja Nowy Sącz | 25 | (0) |
| 2023–2025 | Kotwica Kołobrzeg | 61 | (2) |
| 2025–2026 | ŁKS Łomża | 50 | (4) |
| 2026– | MKS Kotwica Kołobrzeg | 0 | (0) |

Managerial career
- 2026–: MKS Kotwica Kołobrzeg II
- * Club domestic league appearances and goals as of 10:00, 14 August 2026 (UTC)

Łukasz Kosakiewicz (born 19 September 1990) is a Polish professional footballer who plays as a right-back for IV liga West Pomerania club MKS Kotwica Kołobrzeg. He is also in charge of MKS Kotwica's reserve team along with Harrison Omoko.

== Honours ==
Hetman Grzybno

- Klasa A Szczecin IV: 2012–13

ŁKS Łomża

- Polish Cup (Podlasie regionals): 2024–25
