= Szymon Drewniak =

Polish footballer

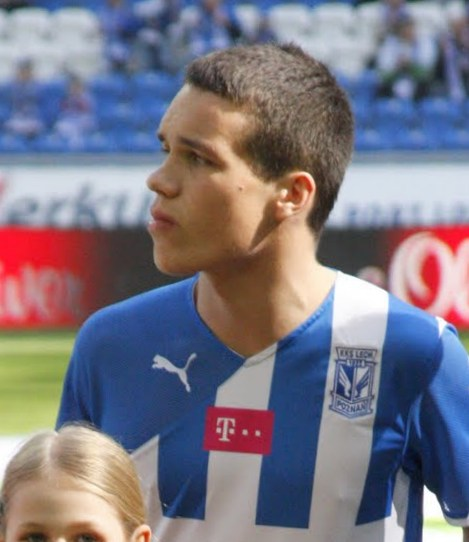
- Drewniak with Lech Poznań in 2012

Personal information
- Full name: Szymon Drewniak
- Date of birth: 11 July 1993 (age 33)
- Place of birth: Poznań, Poland
- Height: 1.79 m (5 ft 10 in)
- Position: Midfielder

Team information
- Current team: Noteć Czarnków
- Number: 6

Youth career
- –2011: Lech Poznań

Senior career*
Years	Team	Apps	(Gls)
2011–2017	Lech Poznań	35	(1)
2013–2015	Lech Poznań II	13	(0)
2014	→ Górnik Zabrze (loan)	13	(0)
2014	→ Górnik Zabrze II (loan)	4	(2)
2015–2016	→ Chrobry Głogów (loan)	31	(3)
2016–2017	→ Górnik Łęczna (loan)	29	(5)
2017–2018	Cracovia	21	(0)
2018–2020	Chrobry Głogów	53	(2)
2020–2021	Arka Gdynia	17	(1)
2021	Odra Opole	17	(2)
2021–2022	Górnik Łęczna	27	(0)
2022–2023	Chojniczanka Chojnice	26	(0)
2023–2025	Górnik Polkowice	57	(3)
2025–	Noteć Czarnków	22	(2)

International career
2009–2010	Poland U17	7	(1)
2010–2011	Poland U18	6	(2)
2011	Poland U19	3	(0)
- * Club domestic league appearances and goals as of 16:19, 4 June 2026 (UTC)

Szymon Drewniak (born 11 July 1993) is a Polish professional footballer who plays as a midfielder for III liga club Noteć Czarnków.

== Club career ==
On 29 July 2020, he signed a two-year contract with Arka Gdynia.

== Career statistics ==
As of match played 17 May 2026

Appearances and goals by club, season and competition
Club	Season	League			Polish Cup		Europe		Other		Total	
Club	Season	Division	Apps	Goals	Apps	Goals	Apps	Goals	Apps	Goals	Apps	Goals
Lech Poznań	2011–12	Ekstraklasa	6	0	—		—		—		6	0
Lech Poznań	2012–13	Ekstraklasa	15	1	1	0	5 (Note: Appearances in UEFA Europa League)	0	—		21	1
Lech Poznań	2013–14	Ekstraklasa	9	0	1	1	4	0	—		14	1
Lech Poznań	2014–15	Ekstraklasa	5	0	2	0	0	0	—		7	0
Lech Poznań	Total		35	1	4	1	9	0	—		48	2
Lech Poznań II	2013–14	III liga, gr. C	1	0	—		—		—		1	0
Lech Poznań II	2014–15	III liga, gr. C	12	0	—		—		—		12	0
Lech Poznań II	Total		13	0	—		—		—		13	0
Górnik Zabrze (loan)	2013–14	Ekstraklasa	12	0	1	0	—		—		13	0
Górnik Zabrze (loan)	2014–15	Ekstraklasa	1	0	—		—		—		1	0
Górnik Zabrze (loan)	Total		13	0	1	0	—		—		14	0
Górnik Zabrze II (loan)	2013–14	III liga, gr. F	2	2	—		—		—		2	2
Górnik Zabrze II (loan)	2014–15	III liga, gr. F	2	0	—		—		—		2	0
Górnik Zabrze II (loan)	Total		4	2	—		—		—		4	2
Chrobry Głogów (loan)	2015–16	I liga	31	3	2	0	—		—		33	3
Górnik Łęczna (loan)	2016–17	Ekstraklasa	29	5	1	0	—		—		30	5
Cracovia	2017–18	Ekstraklasa	21	0	0	0	—		—		21	0
Chrobry Głogów	2018–19	I liga	22	1	2	0	—		—		24	1
Chrobry Głogów	2019–20	I liga	31	1	1	0	—		—		32	1
Chrobry Głogów	Total		53	2	3	0	—		—		56	2
Arka Gdynia	2020–21	I liga	17	1	2	0	—		—		19	1
Odra Opole	2020–21	I liga	16	2	—		—		—		16	2
Odra Opole	2021–22	I liga	1	0	0	0	—		—		1	0
Odra Opole	Total		17	2	0	0	—		—		17	2
Górnik Łęczna	2021–22	I liga	26	0	4	0	—		—		30	0
Górnik Łęczna	2022–23	I liga	1	0	0	0	—		—		1	0
Górnik Łęczna	Total		27	0	4	0	—		—		31	0
Chojniczanka Chojnice	2022–23	I liga	26	0	1	0	—		—		27	0
Górnik Polkowice	2023–24	III liga, gr. III	28	3	0	0	—		—		28	3
Górnik Polkowice	2024–25	III liga, gr. III	29	0	—		—		—		29	0
Górnik Polkowice	Total		57	3	0	0	—		—		57	3
Noteć Czarnków	2025–26	III liga, gr. II	22	2	—		—		—		22	2
Career total			366	21	18	1	9	0	—		393	22

== Honours ==
Lech Poznań

- Ekstraklasa: 2014–15

Górnik Polkowice

- Polish Cup (Legnica regionals): 2023–24
