= Niklas Zulciak =

German footballer

Personal information
- Date of birth: 3 February 1994 (age 32)
- Place of birth: Frankfurt, Germany
- Height: 1.73 m (5 ft 8 in)
- Position: Attacking midfielder

Team information
- Current team: Concordia Buckow/Waldsieversdorf 03
- Number: 20

Youth career
- Viktoria Preußen 07
- 2008–2013: FSV Frankfurt

Senior career*
Years	Team	Apps	(Gls)
2013–2017	Lech Poznań II	90	(40)
2014–2015	Lech Poznań	2	(0)
2017	Stal Mielec	0	(0)
2017–2018	Wisła Puławy	23	(9)
2018–2019	Warta Poznań	8	(1)
2019–2020	Würzburger Kickers	3	(0)
2020–	Concordia Buckow/Waldsieversdorf 03		
- * Club domestic league appearances and goals as of 3 February 2024

Niklas Zulciak (born 3 February 1994) is a German professional footballer who plays as an attacking midfielder for Concordia Buckow/Waldsieversdorf 03.

== Career ==
Zulciak joined Stal Mielec in 2017.

== Career statistics ==
As of match played 19 June 2020

Appearances and goals by club, season and competition
Club	Season	League			National cup		Europe		Other		Total	
Club	Season	Division	Apps	Goals	Apps	Goals	Apps	Goals	Apps	Goals	Apps	Goals
Lech Poznań II	2013–14	III liga, gr. C	18	4	–		—		—		18	4
Lech Poznań II	2014–15	III liga, gr. C	21	9	—		—		—		21	9
Lech Poznań II	2015–16	III liga, gr. C	28	11	—		—		—		28	11
Lech Poznań II	2016–17	III liga, gr. C	23	16	—		—		—		23	16
Lech Poznań II	Total		90	40	—		—		—		90	40
Lech Poznań	2014–15	Ekstraklasa	2	0	0	0	0	0	—		2	0
Stal Mielec	2017–18	I liga	0	0	0	0	—		—		0	0
Wisła Puławy	2017–18	II liga	23	9	0	0	—		—		23	9
Warta Poznań	2018–19	I liga	8	1	0	0	—		—		8	1
Würzburger Kickers	2019–20	3. Liga	3	0	0	0	—		—		3	0
Career total			126	50	0	0	—		—		126	50

== Honours ==
Lech Poznań

- Ekstraklasa: 2014–15
