= Mariusz Magiera =

Polish footballer

Personal information
- Full name: Mariusz Magiera
- Date of birth: 25 August 1984 (age 42)
- Place of birth: Andrychów, Poland
- Height: 1.78 m (5 ft 10 in)
- Position: Defender

Youth career
- Halny Andrychów
- Beskid Andrychów
- 1999–2003: Gwarek Zabrze

Senior career*
Years	Team	Apps	(Gls)
2003–2005	Wisła Kraków	0	(0)
2005–2006	Górnik Zabrze	23	(0)
2006–2007	ŁKS Łódź	22	(0)
2007	Wisła Kraków	0	(0)
2008–2016	Górnik Zabrze	153	(9)
2016–2018	Podbeskidzie Bielsko-Biała	40	(0)
2018–2021	GKS Bełchatów	73	(2)
2021–2024	LKS Goczałkowice-Zdrój	83	(5)
Total		394	(16)
- * Club domestic league appearances and goals

Mariusz Magiera (born 25 August 1984) is a Polish former professional footballer who played as a defender.

== Honours ==
LKS Goczałkowice-Zdrój

- Polish Cup (Tychy regionals): 2023–24
