= Dariusz Kołodziej =

Polish footballer

Personal information
- Full name: Dariusz Robert Kołodziej
- Date of birth: 17 April 1982 (age 44)
- Place of birth: Kraków, Poland
- Height: 1.77 m (5 ft 9 1/2 in)
- Position: Midfielder

Team information
- Current team: Podbeskidzie (academy director)

Senior career*
Years	Team	Apps	(Gls)
1999–2005	Hutnik Kraków		
2005–2008	Podbeskidzie	95	(21)
2008–2009	Górnik Zabrze	23	(3)
2009–2016	Podbeskidzie	107	(16)
2017–2019	Drzewiarz Jasienica	50	(28)
2019–2021	Czarni Jaworze	13	(9)
2023	Czarni Jaworze	5	(1)

Managerial career
- 2022: Podbeskidzie (caretaker)
- * Club domestic league appearances and goals

Dariusz Robert Kołodziej (born 17 April 1982) is a Polish former professional footballer who played as a midfielder. Following retirement, he became a coach and is currently the director of Podbeskidzie Bielsko-Biała's academy.

== Managerial statistics ==
As of match played 16 November 2022

Managerial record by team and tenure
Team	From	To	Record							
Team	From	To	G	W	D	L	GF	GA	GD	Win %
Podbeskidzie (caretaker)	31 August 2022	6 September 2022	1	0	0	1	0	1	−1	0.00
Total			1	0	0	1	0	1	−1	0.00
