= Maciej Mańka =

Polish footballer

Personal information
- Full name: Maciej Mańka
- Date of birth: 30 June 1989 (age 37)
- Place of birth: Tychy, Poland
- Height: 1.83 m (6 ft 0 in)
- Position: Right-back

Team information
- Current team: AKS Mikołów
- Number: 5

Youth career
- MOSM Tychy

Senior career*
Years	Team	Apps	(Gls)
2007–2010	GKS Tychy	56+	(8+)
2010–2016	Górnik Zabrze	16	(0)
2011–2013	→ GKS Tychy (loan)	42	(3)
2016	→ GKS Tychy (loan)	14	(1)
2016–2023	GKS Tychy	174	(19)
2023–2024	Rekord Bielsko-Biała	18	(2)
2024–	AKS Mikołów	23	(3)
- * Club domestic league appearances and goals as of 21:50, 20 June 2025 (UTC)

Maciej Mańka (born 30 June 1989) is a Polish professional footballer who plays as a right-back for V liga Silesia club AKS Mikołów.

== Honours ==
GKS Tychy

- IV liga Silesia I: 2007–08

Rekord Bielsko-Biała

- III liga, group III: 2023–24

== Notes ==
- Maciej Mańka at 90minut.pl (in Polish)
