= Krystian Sanocki =

Polish footballer (born 1996)

Personal information
- Full name: Krystian Sanocki
- Date of birth: 5 August 1996 (age 30)
- Place of birth: Czarnków, Poland
- Height: 1.77 m (5 ft 10 in)
- Position: Winger

Team information
- Current team: Pogoń Szczecin II
- Number: 17

Youth career
- –2012: Amica Wronki
- 2012–2014: Lech Poznań

Senior career*
Years	Team	Apps	(Gls)
2014–2017	Lech Poznań II	39	(7)
2014–2017	Lech Poznań	0	(0)
2016	→ MKS Kluczbork (loan)	9	(0)
2017	→ Kotwica Kołobrzeg (loan)	7	(0)
2017–2019	Warta Poznań	32	(2)
2019–2020	Błękitni Stargard	41	(10)
2020–2022	GKS Katowice	54	(4)
2022–2023	Lech Poznań II	23	(2)
2023–2025	Zawisza Bydgoszcz	57	(10)
2025–2026	Błękitni Stargard	29	(1)
2026–	Pogoń Szczecin II	1	(0)
- * Club domestic league appearances and goals as of 22:04, 2 September 2026 (UTC)

Krystian Sanocki (born 5 August 1996) is a Polish professional footballer who plays as a winger for IV liga West Pomerania club Pogoń Szczecin II.

== Club career ==
On 5 August 2020, he joined GKS Katowice.

On 26 July 2022, he returned to the reserve team of Lech Poznań, signing a one-year contract.

On 6 July the following year, Sanocki moved to III liga side Zawisza Bydgoszcz on a deal until June 2024.

== Career statistics ==
As of match played 30 May 2026

Appearances and goals by club, season and competition
Club	Season	League			Polish Cup		Europe		Other		Total	
Club	Season	Division	Apps	Goals	Apps	Goals	Apps	Goals	Apps	Goals	Apps	Goals
Lech Poznań II	2014–15	III liga, gr. C	14	0	—		—		—		14	0
Lech Poznań II	2015–16	III liga, gr. C	25	7	—		—		—		25	7
Lech Poznań II	Total		39	7	—		—		—		39	7
Lech Poznań	2014–15	Ekstraklasa	0	0	1	0	0	0	—		1	0
Lech Poznań	2015–16	Ekstraklasa	0	0	0	0	0	0	0	0	0	0
Lech Poznań	Total		0	0	1	0	0	0	0	0	1	0
MKS Kluczbork (loan)	2016–17	I liga	9	0	1	0	—		—		10	0
Kotwica Kołobrzeg (loan)	2016–17	II liga	7	0	—		—		—		7	0
Warta Poznań	2017–18	II liga	20	2	0	0	—		—		20	2
Warta Poznań	2018–19	I liga	12	0	0	0	—		—		12	0
Warta Poznań	Total		32	2	0	0	—		—		32	2
Błękitni Stargard	2018–19	II liga	8	3	—		—		—		8	3
Błękitni Stargard	2019–20	I liga	33	7	3	1	—		—		36	8
Błękitni Stargard	Total		41	10	3	1	—		—		44	11
GKS Katowice	2020–21	II liga	35	4	0	0	—		—		35	4
GKS Katowice	2021–22	I liga	19	0	2	0	—		—		21	0
GKS Katowice	Total		54	4	2	0	—		—		56	4
Lech Poznań II	2022–23	II liga	23	2	1	1	—		—		24	3
Zawisza Bydgoszcz	2023–24	III liga, gr. II	34	7	2	1	—		—		36	8
Zawisza Bydgoszcz	2024–25	III liga, gr. II	23	3	—		—		—		23	3
Zawisza Bydgoszcz	Total		57	10	2	1	—		—		59	11
Błękitni Stargard	2025–26	III liga, gr. II	29	1	—		—		—		29	1
Pogoń Szczecin II	2026–27	IV liga West Pom.	0	0	—		—		—		0	0
Career total			291	36	10	3	0	0	0	0	301	39

== Honours ==
Zawisza Bygdoszcz

- Polish Cup (Kuyavia-Pomerania regionals): 2024–25
