= Daniel Ciechański =

Polish footballer

Personal information
- Date of birth: 26 February 1995 (age 31)
- Place of birth: Warsaw, Poland
- Height: 1.82 m (6 ft 0 in)
- Position: Forward

Team information
- Current team: Mazowsze Grójec

Youth career
- Polonia Warsaw

Senior career*
Years	Team	Apps	(Gls)
2013–2014	Chrobry Głogów	20	(2)
2014–2015	Pogoń Siedlce	3	(1)
2014–2015	Pogoń Siedlce II	14	(2)
2015	Piast Gliwice	0	(0)
2015	Piast Gliwice II	17	(11)
2015	→ GKS Katowice (loan)	9	(0)
2016	Polonia Bytom	0	(0)
2016	Gryf Wejherowo	19	(5)
2016–2017	GKS Bełchatów	10	(0)
2017	Pelikan Łowicz	12	(1)
2018–2019	Elana Toruń	19	(7)
2019–2023	KTS Weszło	93	(226)
2023–2024	KS Łomianki	28	(48)
2024–2025	Marcovia Marki	25	(37)
2025–2026	Naprzód Zielonki	14	(19)
2026	Marcovia Marki	15	(1)
2026–	Mazowsze Grójec	0	(0)
- * Club domestic league appearances and goals as of 18:48, 30 July 2026 (UTC)

Daniel Ciechański (born 26 February 1995) is a Polish footballer who plays as a forward for regional league club Mazowsze Grójec.

== Club career ==
In his career, he was associated with, among others, Pogoń Siedlce (then in I liga), Piast Gliwice (then in Ekstraklasa) and GKS Katowice (then in I liga). In 2019, he stopped playing professionally in football, leaving Elana Toruń's team.

In June 2019, he joined the amateur club KTS Weszło. Across four years, he contributed to three straight promotions, to regional league, V liga and IV liga, scoring over 220 goals. Apart from his sports career, he worked as a sports journalist for the Weszło media group. He left KTS Weszło after the 2022–23 season to join KS Łomianki which competed in the Warsaw I group of the regional league.

In July 2025, he moved from Marcovia Marki to the V liga side Naprzód Zielonki.

== Honours ==
Chrobry Głogów

- II liga West: 2013–14

Elana Toruń

- III liga, group II: 2017–18
- Polish Cup (Kuyavia-Pomerania regionals): 2017–18

KTS Weszło

- V liga Masovia I: 2022–23
- Regional league Warsaw I: 2021–22
- Klasa A Warsaw I: 2020–21
- Polish Cup (Warsaw regionals): 2022–23

KS Łomianki

- Regional league Warsaw I: 2023–24
