= Piotr Ruszkul =

Polish footballer

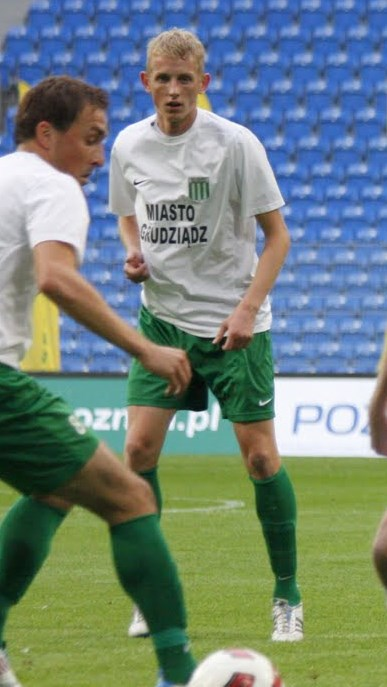

Personal information
- Full name: Piotr Ruszkul
- Date of birth: 4 August 1985 (age 41)
- Place of birth: Kętrzyn, Poland
- Height: 1.83 m (6 ft 0 in)
- Position: Forward

Team information
- Current team: Tylko Lechia Gdańsk
- Number: 19

Youth career
- Orlęta Reszel

Senior career*
Years	Team	Apps	(Gls)
2000–2005	Orlęta Reszel		
2006	Amica Wronki	0	(0)
2006–2007	Olimpia Elbląg		
2007–2009	Górnik Zabrze	3	(0)
2008	→ GKP Gorzów Wlkp. (loan)	14	(2)
2009	→ OKS 1945 Olsztyn (loan)	8	(3)
2009	Unia Janikowo	18	(5)
2010–2014	Olimpia Grudziądz	129	(41)
2014–2015	Wisła Płock	27	(1)
2015	Wigry Suwałki	13	(1)
2016	Tęcza Biskupiec	12	(8)
2016–2017	Bałtyk Gdynia	30	(12)
2017–2020	GKS Przodkowo	73	(26)
2021–2022	AS Pomorze Gdańsk	27	(11)
2022–2024	Ogniwo Sopot	30	(31)
2024–	Tylko Lechia Gdańsk	27	(25)
- * Club domestic league appearances and goals as of 13:41, 30 June 2025 (UTC)

Piotr Ruszkul (born 4 August 1985) is a Polish footballer who plays as a forward for regional league club Tylko Lechia Gdańsk.

== Honours ==
Olimpia Grudziądz

- II liga West: 2010–11

Tylko Lechia Gdańsk

- Klasa B Gdańsk II: 2023–24

Individual

- II liga West top scorer: 2010–11
