= Marcin Krzywicki =

Polish footballer

Personal information
- Full name: Marcin Krzywicki
- Date of birth: 29 November 1986 (age 39)
- Place of birth: Bydgoszcz, Poland
- Height: 2.00 m (6 ft 7 in)
- Position: Forward

Team information
- Current team: Piaski Bydgoszcz
- Number: 27

Youth career
- Zawisza Bydgoszcz

Senior career*
Years	Team	Apps	(Gls)
2004–2005	Zawisza Bydgoszcz		
2005–2006	Pomorzanin Serock		
2007–2008	Victoria Koronowo		
2009–2011	Cracovia	20	(1)
2009	→ Zawisza Bydgoszcz (loan)	13	(0)
2009–2010	→ Unia Janikowo (loan)	26	(14)
2011	→ Ruch Radzionków (loan)	13	(2)
2012–2015	Wisła Płock	87	(21)
2015	Dolcan Ząbki	11	(5)
2016	Chojniczanka Chojnice	9	(0)
2016	GKS Bełchatów	15	(4)
2017	Widzew Łódź	8	(1)
2018–2023	Sportis Łochowo	74	(23)
2023	ADP Bydgoszcz	0	(0)
2023–2024	Unia Solec Kujawski	3	(0)
2024–	Piaski Bydgoszcz	31	(46)

International career
2008	Poland U21	1	(1)
- * Club domestic league appearances and goals as of 14:04, 21 June 2025 (UTC)

Marcin Krzywicki (born 29 November 1986) is a Polish footballer who plays as a forward for Klasa A club Piaski Bydgoszcz.

== Career ==
He made his first appearance in the Ekstraklasa in September 2008.

In July 2011, he was loaned to Ruch Radzionków on a one-year deal.

== Honours ==
Victoria Koronowo

- Polish Cup (Kuyavia-Pomerania regionals): 2006–07

Wisła Płock

- II liga East: 2012–13

Piaski Bydgoszcz

- Klasa B Bydgoszcz II: 2023–24
