= Flota Świnoujście =

Polish football club

- Full name: Morski Klub Sportowy Flota w Świnoujściu
- Nicknames: Wyspiarze (The Islanders); Niebiescy (The Blues)
- Founded: 17 April 1957; 69 years ago (as Wojskowy Klub Sportowy Flota); 20 June 2015; 11 years ago (refounded)
- Ground: Municipal Stadium
- Capacity: 3,070
- Chairman: Marcin Adamski
- Manager: Patryk Dąbrowski (caretaker)
- League: III liga, group II
- 2025–26: III liga, group II, 8th of 18
- Website: mksflota.swinoujscie.pl
Home colours	Away colours

Flota Świnoujście (Polish pronunciation: [ˈflɔta ɕfinɔˈujɕt͡ɕɛ]) is a Polish professional football club based in Świnoujście, West Pomeranian Voivodeship, that competes in group II of the III liga.

Historically, several athletic clubs bore this name, but they were disestablished and replaced several times between 1957 and the present.

Flota, as a club, runs three sports sections: soccer, bridge and table tennis. The club also ran a reserve side, which competed in the lower divisions of Polish football, and three junior sides.

== History ==
Flota's football section was founded on 17 April 1957 in Świnoujście as Wojskowy Klub Sportowy Flota (Military Sport Club Flota). In 1968, the club was reorganized and renamed to Międzyzakładowy Klub Sportowy Flota (Inter-works Sport Club Flota). It was then transformed into Miejski Klub Sportowy Flota (Municipal Sport Club Flota). Due to mounting financial problems, the club was officially dissolved on 13 May 2015.

Following the club's dissolution, team officials promised the creation of a new team which would begin playing in the lowest level of Polish football, indicating that the earliest return to the first division would be possible in 2023. A new association called Morski Klub Sportowy Flota (Maritime Sport Club Flota) was founded on 20 June 2015.

=== League history ===
The club spent the majority of their history in the Polish third division. They played in the second tier for almost seven years: from the club's promotion in 2007 until being withdrawn after 29 games near the end of the 2014–15 season.

In 2015, following the founding of the new association, the club joined the Klasa A, the 8th tier of Polish association football. The club finished first in the klasa A during the 2015/16 season and went on to win the klasa okręgowa, the 7th tier, the following season. In the 2017–18 season, the team was playing at the sixth tier, in the liga okręgowa.

=== Polish Cup ===
The club's most notable result at the central level of the Polish Cup was achieved during the 2012–13 season. In the fall of 2012, Flota eliminated Ruch Zdzieszowice (third division at the time) after a 5–0 victory in the first round. At the subsequent stage, the team won 2–1 against top-tier Górnik Zabrze. The match against Cracovia (second tier) in the next round ended in a 2–2 draw, with Flota advancing to the quarterfinals having won the penalty shootout. In the quarterfinals held in the spring of 2013, Flota was eliminated by Śląsk Wrocław.

Flota also reached the third round of the Polish Cup in 2003.

== Honours ==
- Polish Cup
  - Quarter-finalists: 2012–13

== Former players ==
Had international caps for their respective countries.

Poland

- (Poland) Marcin Adamski (1996)
- (Poland) Arkadiusz Bąk (2008)
- (Poland) Rafał Grzelak (2013–2015)
- (Poland) Robert Kolendowicz (2013–2015)
- (Poland) Arkadiusz Reca (2014–2015)
- (Poland) Paweł Skrzypek (2006–2007)
- (Poland) Michał Stasiak (2013–2015, 2018–2024)

Palestine

- (Palestine) Omar Jarun (2009)
