= Błękitni Stargard =

Polish football club

- Full name: Klub Piłkarski Błękitni Stargard
- Founded: 18 May 1945; 81 years ago
- Ground: Municipal Stadium
- Capacity: 6,000
- Chairman: Robert Gajda
- Manager: Mateusz Silewicz (men's)
- League: III liga, group II (men's); IV liga Lubusz-West Pomerania (women's); IV liga West Pomerania (men's reserves)
- 2025–26: III liga, group II, 12th of 18 (men's)
- Website: http://www.blekitni.stargard.pl/
Home colours	Away colours

Błękitni Stargard is a Polish association football sports club from Stargard. The men's team is currently playing in the fourth-tier III liga, following their 2020–21 relegation from the II liga. The men's reserve and the women's teams compete in their respective fifth divisions. There are also 11 different youth teams. It was formerly a multi-sports club.

== History ==
Former crest of the club until 2024. It depicts a red Griffin, the regional symbol of Western Pomerania.

On 18 May 1945, on the initiative of the athlete Tadeusz Świniarski, a participant of the 1946 European Athletics Championships, Błękitni, the first Polish sports club in Western Pomerania, was founded. The football, boxing and athletics sections were all officially launched in 1945. Two years later, a volleyball section was added. Table tennis and swimming sections followed in 1948 and 1949, respectively.

=== League history ===
In 1980–81, Błękitni finished second behind Gryf Słupsk at the third tier and won promotion to the II liga. During the 1981/82 season, the team played in the second division where they finished 15th out of 16 teams and were relegated back to the third tier.

The club played the next 16 seasons in the III liga, managing to finish second on four separate occasions. However, none of these granted them promotion. In 1998, the club was relegated from the third tier having finished 10th. (Note: After the 1997–98 season, more than half of the clubs at the third level were relegated due to the number of third league groups being reduced from 8 to 4.) Błękitni spent the next two seasons at the fourth tier - in 1998/99 they were denied promotion by Kotwica Kołobrzeg but won their group next season. However, they didn't manage to keep their spot at the third tier and returned to the fourth level one year later.

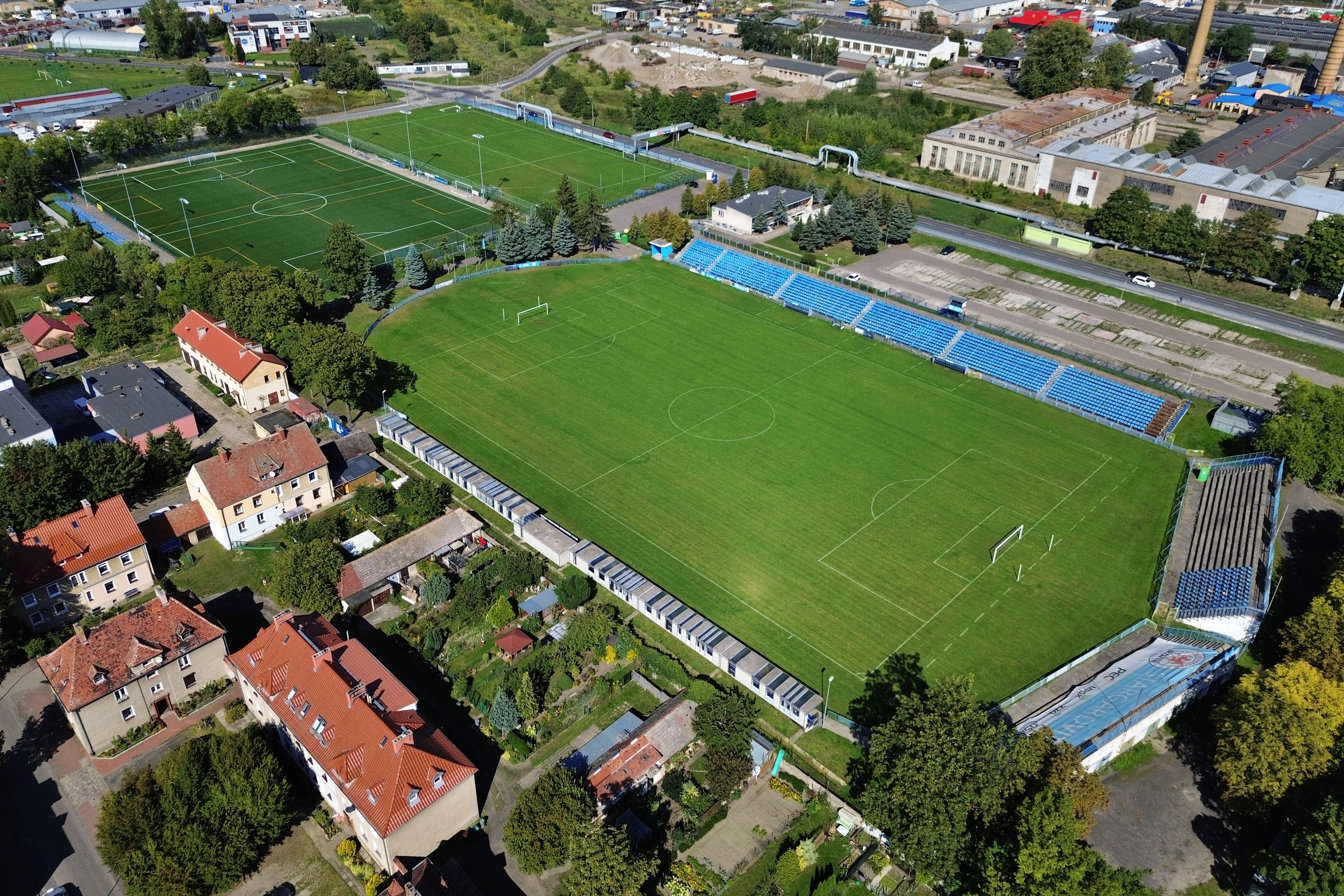
Blekitni Stargard Stadium

After two promotions in succession, in 2002–03, the club returned to the second division but was withdrawn at the halfway stage of the season, their results annulled.

After being withdrawn from the second tier, Błękitni joined the IV liga, the fourth tier of Polish association football, in 2004 and played for the next nine seasons at that level. (Note: In 2008, the fourth level was renamed to from IV liga to III liga. Since then, the division called IV liga is actually the fifth tier.) In 2013, the club won promotion to the third division and has been playing at the third tier since.

=== In the Polish Cup ===
The club had an unprecedented cup run during the 2014–15 season, reaching the semifinals of the Polish Cup. The club was playing in the third division at the time. In the first round, Błękitni won 6–1 with Małapanew Ozimek, lower-tier team. In the second round, the club already eliminated its first higher-level opponent winning 3–1 with Pogoń Siedlce and went on to win against Chojniczanka 1–0 the following round. Both of these opponents were playing in the second division at the time. In the 16th-finals eliminated a fourth-division team, Gryf Wejherowo, 2–1. The following round, Błękitni won with another second-tier team, GKS Tychy, 3–2 and advanced to the quarterfinals which were held in the spring of 2015. Then, having managed to achieve two surprise 2–0 wins, home and away, against Ekstraklasa side Cracovia in the quarterfinals, the team progressed to the semifinals, where they faced Lech Poznań. While Błęktini did win against Lech 3–1 at home, they were eventually knocked out by Lech in the return leg, after losing 1–3 in regular time. In extra time, Lech scored two goals to win the tie 6–4 on aggregate.

== Honours ==
=== Association football (men's) ===
- I liga
  - 15th place: 1981–82
- Polish Cup
  - Semi-finalists: 2014–15

=== Table tennis ===
- Second division: 1957, 1990–2000

== Players ==
=== Current squad ===
As of 14 September 2025

Note: Flags indicate national team as defined under FIFA eligibility rules; some limited exceptions apply. Players may hold more than one non-FIFA nationality.

No.	Pos.	Nation	Player
2	DF	POL	Piotr Delner
3	MF	POL	Mateusz Piotrowski
5	DF	POL	Dawid Rezaeian
6	DF	POL	Jakub Sawczak
7	DF	POL	Maciej Liśkiewicz (captain)
8	DF	POL	Maciej Badowski
9	FW	POL	Damian Niedojad-Bednarczyk
10	MF	POL	Konrad Prawucki
11	MF	POL	Adam Ładziak
12	GK	POL	Bartosz Nowakowski
14	FW	POL	Kacper Zaborski
15	DF	POL	Oliwer Kowalik
16	MF	POL	Krystian Sanocki

No.	Pos.	Nation	Player
17	MF	POL	Maciej Ignasiak
18	DF	POL	Mateusz Jarzębiński
19	DF	POL	Łukasz Michalak
20	DF	POL	Nikodem Fiedosewicz
21	MF	POL	Wojciech Fadecki
22	GK	POL	Miłosz Siekacz
23	MF	POL	Maciej Ogielski
24	DF	POL	Kacper Maczulski
25	MF	POL	Mikołaj Ogrodowski
27	DF	POL	Daniel Zamiara
57	GK	POL	Oskar Czarnota
—	GK	POL	Borys Mieczan
—	MF	POL	Jakub Duda

=== Out on loan ===
Note: Flags indicate national team as defined under FIFA eligibility rules; some limited exceptions apply. Players may hold more than one non-FIFA nationality.

No.	Pos.	Nation	Player
—	MF	POL	Olivier Klis (at Ina Ińsko until 30 June 2026)
