= 2017–18 Polish Cup =

Puchar Polski

Tournament details
- Country: Poland
- Dates: 14 July 2017 – 2 May 2018
- Teams: 68

Final positions
- Champions: Legia Warsaw (19th title)
- Runners-up: Arka Gdynia

Tournament statistics
- Matches played: 72
- Goals scored: 233 (3.24 per match)
- Top goal scorer(s): Igor Angulo; Armando Sadiku; Janusz Surdykowski (4 goals each)

The 2017–18 Polish Cup was the 64th season of the annual Polish football knockout tournament. It began on 14 July 2017 with the first matches of the preliminary round and ended on 2 May 2018 with the final at Stadion Narodowy. Winners of the competition, Legia Warsaw, qualified for the qualifying tournament of the 2018–19 UEFA Europa League. They secured their 19th Polish Cup title ever, after defeating 2–1 defending champions from Arka Gdynia.

== Participating teams ==
Enter in Round of 32	Enter in First Round	Enter in preliminary round		
2016–17 Ekstraklasa; 16 teams	2016–17 I liga 12 highest ranked teams	2016–17 I liga 6 lowest ranked teams	2016–17 II liga 18 teams	Winners of 16 regional cup competitions
Legia Warsaw; Jagiellonia Białystok; Lech Poznań; Lechia Gdańsk; Korona Kielce; Wisła Kraków; Pogoń Szczecin; Bruk-Bet Termalica Nieciecza; Zagłębie Lubin; Piast Gliwice; Śląsk Wrocław; Wisła Płock; Arka Gdynia; Cracovia; Górnik Łęczna; Ruch Chorzów	Sandecja Nowy Sącz; Górnik Zabrze; Zagłębie Sosnowiec; Miedź Legnica; Chojniczanka Chojnice; Olimpia Grudziądz; GKS Katowice; Podbeskidzie Bielsko-Biała; Wigry Suwałki; Stal Mielec; Pogoń Siedlce; Chrobry Głogów	Stomil Olsztyn; GKS Tychy; Bytovia Bytów; Wisła Puławy; Znicz Pruszków; MKS Kluczbork	Raków Częstochowa; Odra Opole; Puszcza Niepołomice; Radomiak Radom; Olimpia Elbląg; Siarka Tarnobrzeg; Błękitni Stargard; Legionovia Legionowo; GKS Bełchatów; Stal Stalowa Wola; Warta Poznań; ROW 1964 Rybnik; Rozwój Katowice; Gryf Wejherowo; Polonia Warsaw; Kotwica Kołobrzeg; Olimpia Zambrów; ~~Polonia Bytom~~^{1}	Polonia Środa Wielkopolska (Greater Poland); Wda Świecie (Kuyavian-Pomeranian); Podhale Nowy Targ (Lesser Poland); Warta Sieradz (Łódź); Zagłębie Lubin II (Lower Silesian); Chełmianka Chełm (Lublin); Stilon Gorzów Wielkopolski (Lubusz); Świt Nowy Dwór Mazowiecki (Masovian); Ruch Zdzieszowice (Opole); Stal Rzeszów (Podkarpackie); ŁKS 1926 Łomża (Podlaskie); Gryf Słupsk (Pomeranian); Rekord Bielsko-Biała (Silesian); KSZO Ostrowiec Świętokrzyski (Świętokrzyskie); Sokół Ostróda (Warmian-Masurian); MKP Szczecinek (West Pomeranian)

Source: 90minut.pl

Notes

1. Polonia Bytom withdrew from the competition.

== Round and draw dates ==
Round	Draw date	First leg	Second leg
Preliminary round	22 June 2017	14–18 July 2017	—
First round	22 June 2017	22–26 July 2017	—
Round of 32	25 July 2017	8–10 August 2017	—
Round of 16	25 July 2017	19–27 September 2017	—
Quarter-finals	25 July 2017	24–26 October 2017	28–29 November 2017
Semi-finals		3–4 April 2018	17–18 April 2018
Final		2 May 2018 at PGE Narodowy	—

Source: 90minut.pl

== Preliminary round ==
The draw for this round was conducted at the headquarters of the Polish FA on 22 June 2017. Participating in this round were 16 regional cup winners, 18 teams from the 2016–17 II liga and 6 lowest ranked teams from the 2016–17 I liga. The matches were played from 14 to 18 July 2017.

16 of the 24 I liga and II liga teams participating in the preliminary round were drawn against the 16 regional cup winners, and the remaining 8 were drawn against each other. Games were hosted by teams playing in the lower division in the 2017–18 season. (Note: Regional cup winners were assured to be hosts of both the preliminary round and the first round games, regardless of their and their opponents' relative position in the league pyramid.) The host of Legionovia Legionowo versus Znicz Pruszków (both teams playing in 2017–18 II liga) game was determined by the order in which the teams were drawn. The number in brackets indicates what tier of Polish football each team competes in during the 2017–18 season.

Team 1	Score	Team 2
14 July 2017
Polonia Środa Wielkopolska (4)	1–2	ROW 1964 Rybnik (3)
15 July 2017
Świt Nowy Dwór Mazowiecki (4)	5–0	Odra Opole (2)
Wda Świecie (4)	1–3	Radomiak Radom (3)
Warta Sieradz (4)	0–0 (a.e.t.) (4–2 p)	Stomil Olsztyn (2)
Stal Rzeszów (4)	3–3 (a.e.t.) (7–6 p)	Olimpia Zambrów (4)
Gryf Słupsk (5)	2–4	MKS Kluczbork (3)
Ruch Zdzieszowice (4)	3–3 (a.e.t.) (3–1 p)	Olimpia Elbląg (3)
Podhale Nowy Targ (4)	0–1	Siarka Tarnobrzeg (3)
MKP Szczecinek (5)	0–7	Błękitni Stargard (3)
ŁKS 1926 Łomża (4)	2–4	Bytovia Bytów (2)
Chełmianka Chełm (4)	1–0	Rozwój Katowice (3)
Kotwica Kołobrzeg (4)	0–2	GKS Tychy (2)
Legionovia Legionowo (3)	3–1	Znicz Pruszków (3)
Wisła Puławy (3)	3–2	Raków Częstochowa (2)
16 July 2017
Rekord Bielsko-Biała (4)	2–6	GKS Bełchatów (3)
Stilon Gorzów Wielkopolski (4)	1–3	Puszcza Niepołomice (2)
Zagłębie Lubin II (4)	0–1	Gryf Wejherowo (3)
18 July 2017
KSZO Ostrowiec Świętokrzyski (4)	1–1 (a.e.t.) (3–2 p)	Warta Poznań (3)
Sokół Ostróda (4)	2–0	Polonia Warsaw (4)
No match
Polonia Bytom (4)	0–3 (awarded)^{1}	Stal Stalowa Wola (3)

Notes

- Note 1: Polonia Bytom withdrew from the competition.

14 July 2017	Polonia Środa Wielkopolska	1–2	ROW 1964 Rybnik	Środa Wielkopolska
17:00 CEST (UTC+02:00)	Molewski 14'	Report	Brychlik 54'; Muszalik 90'	Stadium: CSiR Stadion Średzki; Attendance: 1,400; Referee: Konrad Aluszyk (Gorzów Wielkopolski)

15 July 2017	MKP Szczecinek	0–7	Błękitni Stargard	Szczecinek
16:00 CEST (UTC+02:00)		Report	Wojtasiak 3'; Gutowski 10'; Szymusik 23'; Skórecki 33'; Pustelnik 37' (pen.); Inczewski 68', 72'	Stadium: Stadion Miejski; Referee: Łukasz Karski (Słupsk)

15 July 2017	Warta Sieradz	0–0 (a.e.t.) (4–2 p)	Stomil Olsztyn	Warta
17:00 CEST (UTC+02:00)		Report		Stadium: Stadion Jutrzenki; Referee: Marek Opaliński (Legnica)
	Penalties
	Sitarz (penalty scored); Zawodziński (penalty scored); Mitek (penalty scored); Klepacz (penalty missed); Kacela (penalty scored)		(penalty scored) Lech; (penalty scored) Zahorski; (penalty missed) Baranowski; (penalty missed) Głowacki

15 July 2017	Stal Rzeszów	3–3 (a.e.t.) (7–6 p)	Olimpia Zambrów	Rzeszów
17:00 CEST (UTC+02:00)	Reiman 50'; Szeliga 97'; Hordiychuk 119'	Report	Jackiewicz 70', 103', 109'	Stadium: Stadion Miejski; Attendance: 500; Referee: Mateusz Złotnicki (Lublin)
	Penalties
	Kursa (penalty scored); Marczak (penalty scored); Maślany (penalty scored); Szeliga (penalty missed); Reiman (penalty scored); Skała (penalty scored); Lisańczuk (penalty missed); Hordiychuk (penalty scored); Zięba (penalty scored)		(penalty scored) Jackiewicz; (penalty scored) Grzybowski; (penalty missed) Gryko; (penalty scored) Dębek; (penalty scored) Hryszko; (penalty scored) Jastrzębski; (penalty missed) Koncewicz; (penalty scored) Piłatowski; (penalty missed) Zalewski

15 July 2017	Ruch Zdzieszowice	3–3 (a.e.t.) (3–1 p)	Olimpia Elbląg	Zdzieszowice
17:00 CEST (UTC+02:00)	Kostrzycki 30'; Polak 35'; Werner 71'	Report	Kolosov 23'; Szmydt 67'; Danowski 74'	Stadium: Stadion Miejski; Attendance: 300; Referee: Rafał Rokosz (Katowice)
	Penalties
	Czajkowski (penalty scored); Wieczorek (penalty scored); Sotor (penalty missed); Zapotoczny (penalty scored)		(penalty scored) Wenger; (penalty missed) Szuprytowski; (penalty missed) Kurbiel; (penalty missed) Tułowiecki

15 July 2017	Podhale Nowy Targ	0–1	Siarka Tarnobrzeg	Nowy Targ
17:00 CEST (UTC+02:00)		Report	Grzesik 65'	Stadium: Stadion Miejski im. Józefa Piłsudskiego; Referee: Daniel Kruczyński (Żywiec)

15 July 2017	ŁKS 1926 Łomża	2–4	Bytovia Bytów	Łomża
17:00 CEST (UTC+02:00)	Sadowski 21'; Kaliszewski 51'	Report	Surdykowski 57' (pen.), 63'; Biel 85', 90'	Stadium: Stadion Miejski; Referee: Konrad Gąsiorowski (Biała Podlaska)

15 July 2017	Chełmianka Chełm	1–0	Rozwój Katowice	Chełm
17:00 CEST (UTC+02:00)	Banaszak 13'	Report		Stadium: Stadion Miejski; Attendance: 800; Referee: Damian Gawęcki (Kielce)

15 July 2017	Legionovia Legionowo	3–1	Znicz Pruszków	Legionowo
17:00 CEST (UTC+02:00)	Żebrowski 32'; Kwiatkowski 47'; Koziara 86'	Report	Machalski 33'	Stadium: Stadion Miejski; Referee: Łukasz Kuźma (Białystok)

15 July 2017	Świt Nowy Dwór Mazowiecki	5–0	Odra Opole	Nowy Dwór Mazowiecki
18:00 CEST (UTC+02:00)	Wolski 8'; Drwęcki 25'; Gabrych 38'; Basiuk 73'; Kozłowski 89'	Report		Stadium: Stadion Miejski; Attendance: 500; Referee: Wojciech Myć (Lublin)

15 July 2017	Wda Świecie	1–3	Radomiak Radom	Świecie
18:00 CEST (UTC+02:00)	Retlewski 64' (pen.)	Report	Leândro 26' (pen.); Bemba 70'; Mazan 90'	Stadium: Stadion Miejski; Attendance: 420; Referee: Mariusz Korpalski (Toruń)

15 July 2017	Gryf Słupsk	2–4	MKS Kluczbork	Słupsk
18:00 CEST (UTC+02:00)	Stasiak 28' (pen.); Mikołajczyk 67'	Report	Nitkiewicz 21' (pen.); Deja 51', 90'; Niemczyk 77'	Stadium: Stadion Gryfa; Attendance: 900; Referee: Damian Kos (Gdańsk)

15 July 2017	Kotwica Kołobrzeg	0–2	GKS Tychy	Kołobrzeg
18:00 CEST (UTC+02:00)		Report	Fidziukiewicz 75'; Tanżyna 81'	Stadium: Stadion Miejski; Attendance: 1,500; Referee: Zbigniew Dobrynin (Łódź)

15 July 2017	Wisła Puławy	3–2	Raków Częstochowa	Puławy
18:00 CEST (UTC+02:00)	Ploj 9'; Patejuk 60'; Smektała 90'	Report	Mesjasz 38', 84'	Stadium: Stadion MOSiR; Attendance: 700; Referee: Piotr Urban (Warsaw)

16 July 2017	Zagłębie Lubin II	0–1	Gryf Wejherowo	Polkowice
11:00 CEST (UTC+02:00)			Gabor 88'	Stadium: Stadion KS Polkowice; Referee: Marcin Kochanek (Opole)

16 July 2017	Rekord Bielsko-Biała	2–6	GKS Bełchatów	Bielsko-Biała
17:00 CEST (UTC+02:00)	Sobik 13'; Szędzielarz 28'	Report	Bartosiak 6'; Flaszka 36', 74'; Rachwał 39' (pen.); Pietroń 54'; Thiakane 90'	Stadium: Stadion Rekordu; Attendance: 1,000; Referee: Piotr Lasyk (Bytom)

16 July 2017	Stilon Gorzów Wielkopolski	1–3	Puszcza Niepołomice	Gorzów Wielkopolski
17:00 CEST (UTC+02:00)	Świtaj 80' (pen.)	Report	Orłowski 8', 10'; Ziętarski 70'	Stadium: Stadion OSiR; Attendance: 350; Referee: Piotr Idzik (Poznań)

18 July 2017	KSZO Ostrowiec Świętokrzyski	1–1 (a.e.t.) (3–2 p)	Warta Poznań	Ostrowiec Świętokrzyski
17:00 CEST (UTC+02:00)	Mąka 85'	Report	Laskowski 45' (pen.)	Stadium: Miejski Stadion Sportowy "KSZO"; Attendance: 1,000; Referee: Mariusz Złotek (Stalowa Wola)
	Penalties
	Stachurski (penalty scored); Kapsa (penalty missed); Persona (penalty scored); Mąka (penalty scored)		(penalty scored) Laskowski; (penalty missed) Marciniak; (penalty missed) Kieliba; (penalty scored) Biegański; (penalty missed) Onsorge

18 July 2017	Sokół Ostróda	2–0	Polonia Warsaw	Ostróda
18:00 CEST (UTC+02:00)	Korzeniewski 27'; Ciach 51'	Report		Stadium: Stadion Miejski; Attendance: 980; Referee: Piotr Łęgosz (Włocławek)

== First round ==
The draw for this round was conducted at the headquarters of the Polish FA on 22 June 2017. The matches were played from 22 to 26 July 2017. Participating in this round were the 20 winners from the previous round and 12 highest ranked teams from the 2016–17 I liga. Winners of matches were advanced to the next round. The 12 teams joining in this round were seeded and their opponents were drawn from the 20 winners of the preliminary round (the other 8 formed the remaining 4 matches). Games will be hosted by teams playing in the lower division in the 2017–18 season. Host of match between Puszcza Niepołomice and GKS Tychy (the teams are playing in the same tier) was decided by a draw on 17 July 2017. The number in brackets indicates what tier of Polish football each team competes in during the 2017–18 season.

Team 1	Score	Team 2
22 July 2017
GKS Bełchatów (3)	2–1	Wigry Suwałki (2)
MKS Kluczbork (3)	0–3	Chrobry Głogów (2)
Siarka Tarnobrzeg (3)	1–0	GKS Katowice (2)
Świt Nowy Dwór Mazowiecki (4)	2–2 (a.e.t.) (5–4 p)	Olimpia Grudziądz (2)
Wisła Puławy (3)	2–2 (a.e.t.) (4–3 p)	Pogoń Siedlce (2)
KSZO Ostrowiec Świętokrzyski (4)	0–1	Stal Mielec (2)
Stal Rzeszów (4)	1–3	Miedź Legnica (2)
Radomiak Radom (3)	1–1 (a.e.t.) (2–4 p)	Podbeskidzie Bielsko-Biała (2)
Legionovia Legionowo (3)	1–4	Chojniczanka Chojnice (2)
Chełmianka Chełm (4)	0–3	Zagłębie Sosnowiec (2)
Puszcza Niepołomice (2)	0–1	GKS Tychy (2)
Ruch Zdzieszowice (4)	2–1	Gryf Wejherowo (3)
Błękitni Stargard (3)	1–2	Bytovia Bytów (2)
23 July 2017
Sokół Ostróda (4)	2–1 (a.e.t.)	Stal Stalowa Wola (3)
26 July 2017
ROW 1964 Rybnik (3)	0–2	Górnik Zabrze (1)
Warta Sieradz (4)	1–5	Sandecja Nowy Sącz (1)

22 July 2017	Świt Nowy Dwór Mazowiecki	2–2 (a.e.t.) (5–4 p)	Olimpia Grudziądz	Nowy Dwór Mazowiecki
16:00 CEST (UTC+02:00)	Basiuk 34'; Gabrych 86'	Report	Janicki 7', 42'	Stadium: Stadion Miejski; Attendance: 300; Referee: Tomasz Marciniak (Płock)
	Penalties
	Dankowski (penalty scored); Wolski (penalty scored); Basiuk (penalty scored); Gabrych (penalty scored); Kozłowski (penalty scored)		(penalty scored) Feruga; (penalty scored) Michalik; (penalty scored) Wolski; (penalty scored) Woźniak; (penalty missed) Kaczmarek

22 July 2017	Legionovia Legionowo	1–4	Chojniczanka Chojnice	Legionowo
16:00 CEST (UTC+02:00)	Koziara 59'	Report	Rybski 2'; Mikołajczak 68'; Zawistowski 73' (pen.); Drozdowicz 88'	Stadium: Stadion Miejski; Attendance: 300; Referee: Tomasz Wajda (Żywiec)

22 July 2017	MKS Kluczbork	0–3	Chrobry Głogów	Kluczbork
17:00 CEST (UTC+02:00)		Report	Trytko 26' (pen.), 38'; Szczepaniak 57'	Stadium: Stadion Miejski; Attendance: 500; Referee: Sebastian Jarzębak (Bytom)

22 July 2017	Siarka Tarnobrzeg	1–0	GKS Katowice	Tarnobrzeg
17:00 CEST (UTC+02:00)	Grzesik 15'	Report		Stadium: Stadion OSiR; Attendance: 1,800; Referee: Łukasz Szczech (Warsaw)

22 July 2017	Wisła Puławy	2–2 (a.e.t.) (4–3 p)	Pogoń Siedlce	Puławy
17:00 CEST (UTC+02:00)	Stępniowski 33' (o.g.); Darmochwał 108' (pen.)	Report	Tomasiewicz 73'; Chyła 104'	Stadium: Stadion MOSiR; Attendance: 400; Referee: Marcin Liana (Bydgoszcz)
	Penalties
	Maksymiuk (penalty scored); Smektała (penalty scored); Darmochwał (penalty scored); Poznański (penalty scored); Hirsz (penalty missed)		(penalty missed) Zjawiński; (penalty scored) Paluchowski; (penalty scored) Chyła; (penalty scored) Tomasiewicz; (penalty missed) Czarnecki

22 July 2017	KSZO Ostrowiec Świętokrzyski	0–1	Stal Mielec	Ostrowiec Świętokrzyski
17:00 CEST (UTC+02:00)		Report	Djermanović 47'	Stadium: Miejski Stadion Sportowy "KSZO"; Attendance: 1,600; Referee: Artur Aluszyk (Szczecin)

22 July 2017	Stal Rzeszów	1–3	Miedź Legnica	Rzeszów
17:00 CEST (UTC+02:00)	Zięba 70'	Report	Zieliński 18'; Garguła 38'; Łobodziński 90'	Stadium: Stadion Miejski; Attendance: 1,000; Referee: Robert Marciniak (Kraków)

22 July 2017	Radomiak Radom	1–1 (a.e.t.) (2–4 p)	Podbeskidzie Bielsko-Biała	Radom
17:00 CEST (UTC+02:00)	Cupriak 46'	Report	Podgórski 26' (pen.)	Stadium: Stadion MOSiR; Attendance: 3,300; Referee: Paweł Pskit (Łódź)
	Penalties
	Leândro (penalty scored); Cupriak (penalty missed); Klabník (penalty missed); Brągiel (penalty scored)		(penalty scored) Iliev; (penalty scored) Wiktorski; (penalty scored) Tomczyk; (penalty scored) Hanzel

22 July 2017	Chełmianka Chełm	0–3	Zagłębie Sosnowiec	Chełm
17:00 CEST (UTC+02:00)		Report	Łuczak 75', 79'; Banasiak 90'	Stadium: Stadion Miejski; Attendance: 1,000; Referee: Wojciech Krztoń (Olsztyn)

22 July 2017	Puszcza Niepołomice	0–1	GKS Tychy	Niepołomice
17:00 CEST (UTC+02:00)		Report	Biernat 19'	Stadium: Stadion Miejski; Attendance: 500; Referee: Sebastian Tarnowski (Wrocław)

22 July 2017	Ruch Zdzieszowice	2–1	Gryf Wejherowo	Zdzieszowice
17:00 CEST (UTC+02:00)	Czajkowski 50' (pen.); Sotor 58'	Report	Nadolski 20' (pen.)	Stadium: Stadion Miejski; Attendance: 400; Referee: Paweł Kukla (Kraków)

22 July 2017	Błękitni Stargard	1–2	Bytovia Bytów	Stargard
17:00 CEST (UTC+02:00)	Węsierski 57'	Report	Surdykowski 33' (pen.); Biel 44'	Stadium: Stadion Miejski; Attendance: 800; Referee: Łukasz Bednarek (Koszalin)

22 July 2017	GKS Bełchatów	2–1	Wigry Suwałki	Bełchatów
19:00 CEST (UTC+02:00)	Flaszka 88'; Giel 90'	Report	Klepczyński 90' (o.g.)	Stadium: GIEKSA Arena; Attendance: 1,000; Referee: Dominik Sulikowski (Gdańsk)

23 July 2017	Sokół Ostróda	2–1 (a.e.t.)	Stal Stalowa Wola	Ostróda
19:45 CEST (UTC+02:00)	Otręba 25'; Zalewski 110'	Report	Dziubiński 90'	Stadium: Stadion Miejski; Attendance: 950; Referee: Konrad Kiełczewski (Białystok)

26 July 2017	Warta Sieradz	1–5	Sandecja Nowy Sącz	Warta
17:30 CEST (UTC+02:00)	Mitek 85'	Report	Piszczek 13'; Mráz 16'; Trochim 56'; Korzym 60', 70'	Stadium: Stadion Jutrzenki; Attendance: 500; Referee: Szymon Lizak (Poznań)

26 July 2017	ROW 1964 Rybnik	0–2	Górnik Zabrze	Rybnik
19:00 CEST (UTC+02:00)		Report	Matuszek 31'; Urynowicz 87'	Stadium: Stadion MOSiR; Attendance: 5,516; Referee: Marcin Szrek (Kielce)

== Bracket ==
Round of 32
Sokół Ostróda	1
Górnik Zabrze	3
Miedź Legnica	1
Sandecja Nowy Sącz	2
GKS Bełchatów	0
Chojniczanka Chojnice	3
Siarka Tarnobrzeg	1
Bruk-Bet Termalica Nieciecza (a.e.t.)	4
Wisła Puławy	1
Legia Warsaw	4
Ruch Zdzieszowice	2
Górnik Łęczna	1
Pogoń Szczecin	3
Lech Poznań	0
Bytovia Bytów	1
Lechia Gdańsk	0
Świt Nowy Dwór Mazowiecki	1
Podbeskidzie Bielsko-Biała	3
Arka Gdynia (a.e.t.)	4
Śląsk Wrocław	2
Stal Mielec	0
Piast Gliwice	2
Ruch Chorzów	1
Chrobry Głogów	3
GKS Tychy	1 (1)
Cracovia (p)	1 (4)
Zagłębie Lubin	2
Jagiellonia Białystok	1
Zagłębie Sosnowiec	1
Korona Kielce (a.e.t.)	2
Wisła Kraków	2
Wisła Płock	1

Round of 16
Górnik Zabrze (a.e.t.)	3
Sandecja Nowy Sącz	2
Chojniczanka Chojnice	2
Bruk-Bet Termalica Nieciecza	1
Legia Warsaw	4
Ruch Zdzieszowice	0
Pogoń Szczecin	0 (4)
Bytovia Bytów (p)	0 (5)
Podbeskidzie Bielsko-Biała	1
Arka Gdynia (a.e.t.)	2
Piast Gliwice	1
Chrobry Głogów	2
Cracovia	0
Zagłębie Lubin	3
Korona Kielce (a.e.t.)	1
Wisła Kraków	0

Quarterfinals
Górnik Zabrze	3	3
Chojniczanka Chojnice	1	0
Legia Warsaw	3	4
Bytovia Bytów	1	2
Arka Gdynia	2	1
Chrobry Głogów	0	1
Zagłębie Lubin	0	0
Korona Kielce	1	2

Semifinals
Górnik Zabrze	1	1
Legia Warsaw	1	2
Arka Gdynia	1	1
Korona Kielce	2	0

Final
Legia Warsaw	2
Arka Gdynia	1

== Round of 32 ==
The draw for this round was conducted at the PGE Narodowy on 25 July 2017. The matches were played on 8–10 August 2017. Participating in this round were the 16 winners from the previous round and 16 teams from the 2016–17 Ekstraklasa. Games were hosted by teams playing in the lower division in the 2017–18 season. The hosts of matches of teams playing in the same tier were the teams occupying a higher position in the bracket.

Team 1	Score	Team 2
8 August 2017
Siarka Tarnobrzeg (3)	1–4 (a.e.t.)	Bruk-Bet Termalica Nieciecza (1)
Wisła Puławy (3)	1–4	Legia Warsaw (1)
Ruch Zdzieszowice (4)	2–1	Górnik Łęczna (2)
Świt Nowy Dwór Mazowiecki (4)	1–3	Podbeskidzie Bielsko-Biała (2)
Stal Mielec (2)	0–2	Piast Gliwice (1)
Ruch Chorzów (2)	1–3	Chrobry Głogów (2)
Wisła Kraków (1)	2–1	Wisła Płock (1)
9 August 2017
Sokół Ostróda (4)	1–3	Górnik Zabrze (1)
Miedź Legnica (2)	1–2	Sandecja Nowy Sącz (1)
GKS Bełchatów (3)	0–3	Chojniczanka Chojnice (2)
Pogoń Szczecin (1)	3–0	Lech Poznań (1)
Bytovia Bytów (2)	1–0	Lechia Gdańsk (1)
GKS Tychy (2)	1–1 (a.e.t.) (1–4 p)	Cracovia (1)
Zagłębie Lubin (1)	2–1	Jagiellonia Białystok (1)
10 August 2017
Arka Gdynia (1)	4–2 (a.e.t.)	Śląsk Wrocław (1)
Zagłębie Sosnowiec (2)	1–2 (a.e.t.)	Korona Kielce (1)

8 August 2017	Siarka Tarnobrzeg	1–4 (a.e.t.)	Bruk-Bet Termalica Nieciecza	Tarnobrzeg
17:00 CEST (UTC+02:00)	Czyżycki 88'	Report	Gutkovskis 4'; Śpiączka 95' (pen.), 118'; Mišák 120'	Stadium: Stadion OSiR; Attendance: 1,000; Referee: Piotr Urban (Warsaw)

8 August 2017	Ruch Zdzieszowice	2–1	Górnik Łęczna	Zdzieszowice
17:00 CEST (UTC+02:00)	Zapotoczny 11'; Sotor 21'	Report	Suchanek 44'	Stadium: Stadion Miejski; Attendance: 600; Referee: Daniel Kruczyński (Żywiec)

8 August 2017	Wisła Puławy	1–4	Legia Warsaw	Puławy
18:00 CEST (UTC+02:00)	Hirsz 90'	Report	Mączyński 9'; Sedlewski 11' (o.g.); Nagy 64'; Sadiku 90'	Stadium: Stadion MOSiR; Attendance: 3,930; Referee: Bartosz Frankowski (Toruń)

8 August 2017	Świt Nowy Dwór Mazowiecki	1–3	Podbeskidzie Bielsko-Biała	Nowy Dwór Mazowiecki
19:00 CEST (UTC+02:00)	Pomorski 20'	Report	Rakowski 12'; Šabala 43'; Tomczyk 73'	Stadium: Stadion Miejski; Attendance: 900; Referee: Łukasz Szczech (Warsaw)

8 August 2017	Stal Mielec	0–2	Piast Gliwice	Mielec
19:00 CEST (UTC+02:00)		Report	Bukata 9'; Dziczek 76' (pen.)	Stadium: Stadion Stali; Attendance: 3,049; Referee: Mateusz Złotnicki (Lublin)

8 August 2017	Ruch Chorzów	1–3	Chrobry Głogów	Chorzów
19:00 CEST (UTC+02:00)	Arak 11'	Report	Machaj 32', 62'; Trytko 86'	Stadium: Stadion Miejski; Attendance: 3,365; Referee: Dawid Bukowczan (Żywiec)

8 August 2017	Wisła Kraków	2–1	Wisła Płock	Kraków
20:45 CEST (UTC+02:00)	González 56' (pen.), 86' (pen.)	Report	Łukowski 49'	Stadium: Stadion Miejski im. Henryka Reymana; Attendance: 7,827; Referee: Dominik Sulikowski (Gdańsk)

9 August 2017	Sokół Ostróda	1–3	Górnik Zabrze	Ostróda
19:00 CEST (UTC+02:00)	Mlonek 20'	Report	R. Wolsztyński 67', 90'; Kądzior 85'	Stadium: Stadion Miejski; Attendance: 2,214; Referee: Sylwester Rasmus (Toruń)

9 August 2017	Miedź Legnica	1–2	Sandecja Nowy Sącz	Legnica
19:00 CEST (UTC+02:00)	Garguła 45' (pen.)	Report	Trochim 86', 90'	Stadium: Stadion im. Orła Białego; Attendance: 2,100; Referee: Tomasz Wajda (Żywiec)

9 August 2017	GKS Bełchatów	0–3	Chojniczanka Chojnice	Bełchatów
19:00 CEST (UTC+02:00)		Report	Boczek 55'; Mikołajczak 62'; Podgórski 72'	Stadium: GIEKSA Arena; Attendance: 996; Referee: Wojciech Myć (Lublin)

9 August 2017	Bytovia Bytów	1–0	Lechia Gdańsk	Bytów
19:00 CEST (UTC+02:00)	Kamiński 61'	Report		Stadium: Stadion MOSiR; Attendance: 2,009; Referee: Łukasz Bednarek (Koszalin)

9 August 2017	GKS Tychy	1–1 (a.e.t.) (1–4 p)	Cracovia	Tychy
19:30 CEST (UTC+02:00)	Tanżyna 81'	Report	Deja 52'	Stadium: Stadion Mieski; Attendance: 6,109; Referee: Zbigniew Dobrynin (Łódź)
	Penalties
	Ćwielong (penalty missed); Zapolnik (penalty scored); Mańka (penalty missed)		(penalty scored) Piątek; (penalty scored) Wójcicki; (penalty scored) Helik; (penalty scored) Sipľak

9 August 2017	Pogoń Szczecin	3–0	Lech Poznań	Szczecin
20:00 CEST (UTC+02:00)	Kort 37', 77'; Frączczak 45' (pen.)	Report		Stadium: Stadion Miejski im. Floriana Krygiera; Attendance: 5,903; Referee: Krzysztof Jakubik (Siedlce)

9 August 2017	Zagłębie Lubin	2–1	Jagiellonia Białystok	Lubin
20:00 CEST (UTC+02:00)	Kubicki 34'; Janoszka 63'	Report	Novikovas 90'	Stadium: Stadion Zagłębia; Attendance: 4,839; Referee: Paweł Pskit (Łódź)

10 August 2017	Zagłębie Sosnowiec	1–2 (a.e.t.)	Korona Kielce	Sosnowiec
19:00 CEST (UTC+02:00)	Nawotka 120'	Report	Soriano 105'; Możdżeń 111'	Stadium: Stadion Ludowy; Attendance: 2,456; Referee: Sebastian Jarzębak (Bytom)

10 August 2017	Arka Gdynia	4–2 (a.e.t.)	Śląsk Wrocław	Gdynia
20:00 CEST (UTC+02:00)	Zbozień 63'; Siemaszko 66', 110'; Kakoko 102'	Report	Pawelec 42'; Piech 43'	Stadium: Stadion GOSiR; Attendance: 6,548; Referee: Jarosław Przybył (Kluczbork)

== Round of 16 ==
The 16 winners from the previous round competed in this round. The draw for this round was conducted at PGE Narodowy, Warsaw on 25 July 2017. Matches were played from 19 September to 27 September 2017. Hosts of matches between teams playing in the same tier were decided by a draw conducted on 11 August 2017.

Team 1	Score	Team 2
19 September 2017
Bytovia Bytów (2)	0–0 (a.e.t.) (5–4 p)	Pogoń Szczecin (1)
Podbeskidzie Bielsko-Biała (2)	1–2 (a.e.t.)	Arka Gdynia (1)
20 September 2017
Górnik Zabrze (1)	3–2 (a.e.t.)	Sandecja Nowy Sącz (1)
Korona Kielce (1)	1–0 (a.e.t.)	Wisła Kraków (1)
21 September 2017
Ruch Zdzieszowice (4)	0–4	Legia Warsaw (1)
Cracovia (1)	0–3	Zagłębie Lubin (1)
26 September 2017
Chrobry Głogów (2)	2–1	Piast Gliwice (1)
27 September 2017
Chojniczanka Chojnice (2)	2–1	Bruk-Bet Termalica Nieciecza (1)

19 September 2017	Bytovia Bytów	0–0 (a.e.t.) (5–4 p)	Pogoń Szczecin	Bytów
17:45 CEST (UTC+02:00)		Report		Stadium: Stadion MOSiR; Attendance: 1,560; Referee: Sylwester Rasmus (Toruń)
	Penalties
	Wróbel (penalty scored); Hebel (penalty missed); Duda (penalty scored); Wolski (penalty scored); Surdykowski (penalty scored); Stasiak (penalty scored)		(penalty scored) Gyurcsó; (penalty scored) Drygas; (penalty scored) Nunes; (penalty missed) Kort; (penalty scored) Tsintsadze; (penalty missed) Dvali

19 September 2017	Podbeskidzie Bielsko-Biała	1–2 (a.e.t.)	Arka Gdynia	Bielsko-Biała
20:45 CEST (UTC+02:00)	Sobczak 20'	Report	Piesio 14'; Zarandia 110'	Stadium: Stadion Miejski; Attendance: 4,235; Referee: Wojciech Myć (Lublin)

20 September 2017	Górnik Zabrze	3–2 (a.e.t.)	Sandecja Nowy Sącz	Zabrze
17:45 CEST (UTC+02:00)	Matuszek 65'; Angulo 75', 99'	Report	Kolev 85'; Grendel 90' (o.g.)	Stadium: Ernest Pohl Stadium; Attendance: 10,038; Referee: Bartosz Frankowski (Toruń)

20 September 2017	Korona Kielce	1–0 (a.e.t.)	Wisła Kraków	Kielce
20:45 CEST (UTC+02:00)	Diaw 92'	Report		Stadium: Stadion Miejski; Attendance: 5,072; Referee: Jarosław Przybył (Kluczbork)

21 September 2017	Ruch Zdzieszowice	0–4	Legia Warsaw	Opole
15:30 CEST (UTC+02:00)		Report	Broź 18' (pen.); Sadiku 64'; Szymański 75'; Dąbrowski 82'	Stadium: Stadion Miejski (Note: Ruch Zdzieszowice will play their home match against Legia at Stadion Miejski, Opole, instead of their regular stadium Stadion Miejski, Zdzieszowice, due to a police decision.); Attendance: 3,500; Referee: Kornel Paszkiewicz (Wrocław)

21 September 2017	Cracovia	0–3	Zagłębie Lubin	Kraków
20:45 CEST (UTC+02:00)		Report	Świerczok 5' (pen.); Pawłowski 25'; Kopacz 35'	Stadium: Józef Piłsudski Stadium; Attendance: 3,406; Referee: Piotr Lasyk (Bytom)

26 September 2017	Chrobry Głogów	2–1	Piast Gliwice	Głogów
18:00 CEST (UTC+02:00)	M. Machaj 42'; Kaczmarek 67'	Report	Jankowski 26'	Stadium: GOS Stadium; Attendance: 1,157; Referee: Paweł Pskit (Łódź)

27 September 2017	Chojniczanka Chojnice	2–1	Bruk-Bet Termalica Nieciecza	Chojnice
15:30 CEST (UTC+02:00)	Mikołajczak 60'; Zawistowski 85'	Report	Szeliga 68'	Stadium: Stadion Miejski; Attendance: 1,498; Referee: Łukasz Bednarek (Koszalin)

== Quarter-finals ==
The 8 winners from Round of 16 competed in this round. The matches were played in two legs. The first leg took place on 24–26 October 2017. The second leg took place on 28 and 29 November 2017. The draw for this round was conducted at PGE Narodowy, Warsaw on 25 July 2017. Host of first match between teams playing in the same tier (Zagłębie Lubin and Korona Kielce) was decided by a draw conducted on 28 September 2017.

Team 1	Agg.	Team 2	1st leg	2nd leg
Chojniczanka Chojnice (2)	1–6	Górnik Zabrze (1)	1–3	0–3
Bytovia Bytów (2)	3–7	Legia Warsaw (1)	1–3	2–4
Chrobry Głogów (2)	1–3	Arka Gdynia (1)	0–2	1–1
Zagłębie Lubin (1)	0–3	Korona Kielce (1)	0–1	0–2

=== First leg ===
24 October 2017	Chojniczanka Chojnice	1–3	Górnik Zabrze	Chojnice
20:30 CEST (UTC+02:00)	Kieruzel 72'	Report	Angulo 26' (pen.), 32'; Kądzior 63'	Stadium: Stadion Miejski; Attendance: 2,183; Referee: Szymon Marciniak (Płock)

25 October 2017	Bytovia Bytów	1–3	Legia Warsaw	Bytów
20:30 CEST (UTC+02:00)	Szewczyk 45'	Report	Sadiku 2', 87'; Pasquato 29'	Stadium: Stadion MOSiR; Attendance: 2,000; Referee: Jarosław Przybył (Kluczbork)

25 October 2017	Chrobry Głogów	0–2	Arka Gdynia	Głogów
18:00 CEST (UTC+02:00)		Report	Jurado 16'; Danielak 90' (o.g.)	Stadium: GOS Stadium; Attendance: 1,786; Referee: Paweł Gil (Lublin)

26 October 2017	Zagłębie Lubin	0–1	Korona Kielce	Lubin
20:30 CEST (UTC+02:00)		Report	Górski 45'	Stadium: Stadion Zagłębia; Attendance: 2,893; Referee: Paweł Raczkowski (Warsaw)

=== Second leg ===
28 November 2017	Górnik Zabrze	3–0 (6–1 agg.)	Chojniczanka Chojnice	Zabrze
18:00 CET (UTC+01:00)	Kurzawa 62'; Ł. Wolsztyński 71'; Żurkowski 84'	Report		Stadium: Ernest Pohl Stadium; Attendance: 10,087; Referee: Marek Opaliński (Legnica)

28 November 2017	Legia Warsaw	4–2 (7–3 agg.)	Bytovia Bytów	Warsaw
20:45 CET (UTC+01:00)	Pereira 47', 62'; Szymański 49', 71'	Report	Surdykowski 26'; Kamiński 90'	Stadium: Polish Army Stadium; Attendance: 7,240; Referee: Sebastian Jarzębak (Bytom)

29 November 2017	Arka Gdynia	1–1 (3–1 agg.)	Chrobry Głogów	Gdynia
18:00 CET (UTC+01:00)	Jazvić 22'	Report	Kowalczyk 69'	Stadium: Stadion GOSiR; Attendance: 4,021; Referee: Kornel Paszkiewicz (Wrocław)

29 November 2017	Korona Kielce	2–0 (3–0 agg.)	Zagłębie Lubin	Kielce
20:45 CET (UTC+01:00)	Janoszka 8' (o.g.); Burdenski 82'	Report		Stadium: Stadion Miejski; Attendance: 7,278; Referee: Daniel Stefański (Bydgoszcz)

== Semi-finals ==
The 4 winners from the Quarterfinals competed in this round. The matches were played in two legs. The first legs took place on 3-4 April 2018. The second legs took place on 18 April 2018. The draw for this round was conducted at Stadion Miejski, Kielce on 29 November 2017.

Team 1	Agg.	Team 2	1st leg	2nd leg
Górnik Zabrze (1)	2–3	Legia Warsaw (1)	1–1	1–2
Korona Kielce (1)	2–2 (a)	Arka Gdynia (1)	2–1	0–1

=== First leg ===
3 April 2018	Górnik Zabrze	1–1	Legia Warsaw	Zabrze
18:00 CEST (UTC+02:00)	Kurzawa 75'	Report	Vešović 61'	Stadium: Ernest Pohl Stadium; Attendance: 22,708; Referee: Daniel Stefański (Bydgoszcz)

4 April 2018	Korona Kielce	2–1	Arka Gdynia	Kielce
18:00 CEST (UTC+02:00)	Kacharava 14', 69'	Report	Zarandia 80'	Stadium: Stadion Miejski; Attendance: 9,678; Referee: Piotr Lasyk (Bytom)

=== Second leg ===
18 April 2018	Legia Warsaw	2–1 (3–2 agg.)	Górnik Zabrze	Warsaw
20:30 CEST (UTC+02:00)	Kucharczyk 74'; Niezgoda 90+7'	Report	Hloušek 56' (o.g.)	Stadium: Polish Army Stadium; Attendance: 15,000; Referee: Bartosz Frankowski (Toruń)

17 April 2018	Arka Gdynia	1–0 (2 (a)–2 agg.)	Korona Kielce	Gdynia
20:30 CEST (UTC+02:00)	da Silva 85'	Report		Stadium: Stadion GOSiR; Attendance: 6,789; Referee: Jarosław Przybył (Kluczbork)

== Final ==
The final match was played at the Stadion Narodowy, Warsaw on 2 May 2018. The host of the final match was decided by a draw which was conducted on 17 April 2018.

2 May 2018
16:00 CEST (UTC+02:00)

Arka Gdynia	1–2	Legia Warsaw
Sołdecki 90+9'	PZPN; 90minut	Niezgoda 12'; Cafú 29'

Stadion Narodowy, Warsaw
Attendance: 47,037
Referee: Piotr Lasyk (Bytom)

Arka Gdynia	Legia Warsaw

GK	1	(Latvia) Pāvels Šteinbors
RB	33	(Poland) Damian Zbozień
CB	29	(Poland) Michał Marcjanik
CB	28	(Denmark) Frederik Helstrup
LB	23	(Poland) Marcin Warcholak
DM	4	(Poland) Dawid Sołdecki
CM	90	(Ukraine) Andriy Bohdanov		(substituted off) 46'
CM	14	(Poland) Michał Nalepa	(yellow card) 42'	(substituted off) 73'
RM	8	(Brazil) Marcus da Silva (c)
LM	10	(Poland) Mateusz Szwoch
CF	22	(Poland) Maciej Jankowski		(substituted off) 46'
Substitutes:
GK	80	(Poland) Krzysztof Pilarz
DF	2	(Poland) Tadeusz Socha
DF	17	(Poland) Adam Marciniak		(substituted on) 73'
MF	13	(Poland) Grzegorz Piesio	(red card) 71'	(substituted on) 46'
MF	24	(Poland) Patryk Kun
FW	9	(Spain) Rubén Jurado
FW	11	(Poland) Rafał Siemaszko		(substituted on) 46'
Manager:
(Poland) Leszek Ojrzyński

GK	33	(Poland) Radosław Cierzniak
RB	20	(Montenegro) Marko Vešović
CB	44	(France) William Rémy
CB	2	(Poland) Michał Pazdan
LB	14	(Czech Republic) Adam Hloušek
RM	26	(Portugal) Cafú
CM	6	(Luxembourg) Chris Philipps
LM	7	(Croatia) Domagoj Antolić
RW	18	(Poland) Michał Kucharczyk	(substituted off) 89'
LW	32	(Serbia) Miroslav Radović (c)	(substituted off) 65'
CF	11	(Poland) Jarosław Niezgoda	(substituted off) 74'
Substitutes:
GK	1	(Poland) Arkadiusz Malarz
DF	3	(Brazil) Maurício
DF	55	(Poland) Artur Jędrzejczyk
MF	8	(Italy) Cristian Pasquato
MF	22	(Finland) Kasper Hämäläinen	(substituted on) 74'
MF	53	(Poland) Sebastian Szymański	(substituted on) 65'
FW	9	(Croatia) Eduardo	(substituted on) 89'
Manager:
(Croatia) Dean Klafurić

Match officials:
Referee:
Piotr Lasyk
Assistant referees:
Dawid Golis
Bartłomiej Lekki
Fourth official:
Mariusz Złotek
Video assistant referee:
Paweł Gil
Marcin Borkowski

Match rules

- 90 minutes.
- 30 minutes of extra-time if necessary.
- Penalty shoot-out if scores still level.
- Seven named substitutes.
- Maximum of three substitutions.

== Top goalscorers ==
Rank	Player	Club	Goals
1	(Spain) Igor Angulo	Górnik Zabrze	4
1	(Albania) Armando Sadiku	Legia Warsaw	4
1	(Poland) Janusz Surdykowski	Bytovia Bytów	4
4	(Poland) Bartosz Biel	Bytovia Bytów	3
4	(Poland) Dawid Flaszka	GKS Bełchatów	3
4	(Poland) Kamil Jackiewicz	Olimpia Zambrów	3
4	(Poland) Mateusz Machaj	Chrobry Głogów	3
4	(Poland) Tomasz Mikołajczak	Chojniczanka Chojnice	3
4	(Poland) Sebastian Szymański	Legia Warsaw	3
4	(Poland) Bartosz Śpiączka	Bruk-Bet Termalica Nieciecza	3
4	(Poland) Wojciech Trochim	Sandecja Nowy Sącz	3
4	(Poland) Przemysław Trytko	Chrobry Głogów	3

== See also ==
- 2017–18 Ekstraklasa
- 2017–18 I liga
