= 2015–16 Polish Cup =

Puchar Polski

Tournament details
- Country: Poland
- Dates: 18 July 2015 – 2 May 2016
- Teams: 68

Final positions
- Champions: Legia Warsaw
- Runners-up: Lech Poznań

Tournament statistics
- Matches played: 73
- Goals scored: 209 (2.86 per match)
- Top goal scorer(s): Nemanja Nikolić (6 goals)

The 2015–16 Polish Cup was the 62nd season of the annual Polish football knockout tournament. It began on 18 July 2015 with the first matches of the preliminary round and ended on 2 May 2016 with the final at the Stadion Narodowy in Warsaw. Winners of the competition qualified for the qualifying tournament of the 2016–17 UEFA Europa League.

The 2015–16 season brought several changes into the competition format determined by the 2014 reform of II liga (3rd tier), which decreased the number of teams playing in the league from 36 to 18 and the number of teams participating in the Polish Cup from 86 to 68. The tournament had one preliminary round (instead of two in previous seasons), in which also the 6 lowest-ranked I liga (2nd tier) teams entered.

Legia Warsaw successfully defended the Polish Cup champion title, winning the final game 1–0 against Lech Poznań and secured their eighteenth title.

== Participating teams ==
Enter in Round of 32	Enter in First round	Enter in Preliminary round		
2014–15 Ekstraklasa; 16 teams	2014–15 I Liga; 12 highest ranked teams	2014–15 I Liga; 6 lowest ranked teams	2014–15 II liga 18 teams	Winners of 16 regional cup competitions
Lech Poznań; Legia Warsaw; Jagiellonia Białystok; Śląsk Wrocław; Lechia Gdańsk; Wisła Kraków; Górnik Zabrze; Pogoń Szczecin; Cracovia; Ruch Chorzów; Korona Kielce; Piast Gliwice; Podbeskidzie Bielsko-Biała; Górnik Łęczna; Zawisza Bydgoszcz; GKS Bełchatów	Zagłębie Lubin; Termalica Bruk-Bet Nieciecza; Wisła Płock; Olimpia Grudziądz; Chojniczanka Chojnice; Dolcan Ząbki; Stomil Olsztyn; GKS Katowice; Wigry Suwałki; Arka Gdynia; Chrobry Głogów; Miedź Legnica	Bytovia Bytów; Sandecja Nowy Sącz; Pogoń Siedlce; GKS Tychy; ~~Widzew Łódź~~^{2}; ~~Flota Świnoujście~~^{3}	MKS Kluczbork; Zagłębie Sosnowiec; Rozwój Katowice; Raków Częstochowa; KS ROW 1964 Rybnik^{1}; Błękitni Stargard Szczeciński; Stal Stalowa Wola; Stal Mielec; Znicz Pruszków; Nadwiślan Góra; Legionovia Legionowo; Siarka Tarnobrzeg; Wisła Puławy; Okocimski KS Brzesko; Puszcza Niepołomice; Kotwica Kołobrzeg; Górnik Wałbrzych; ~~Limanovia Limanowa~~^{4}	Ślęza Wrocław (Lower Silesia); Wda Świecie (Kujawy-Pomerania); Chełmianka Chełm (Lublin); Stilon Gorzów Wielkopolski (Lubusz); Boruta Zgierz (Łódź); Garbarnia Kraków (Lesser Poland); Ursus Warszawa (Mazovia); Odra Opole (Opole); Resovia Rzeszów (Podkarpacie); ŁKS Łomża (Podlasie); Rodło Kwidzyn (Pomerania); Grunwald Ruda Śląska (Silesia); Wisła Sandomierz (Świętokrzyskie); Olimpia Olsztynek (Warmia-Masuria); KKS 1925 Kalisz (Greater Poland); Gwardia Koszalin (West Pomerania)

Source: 90minut.pl

Notes

1. Competed in 2014–15 season as Energetyk ROW Rybnik.
2. Widzew Łódź dissolved after the 2014–15 season.
3. Flota Świnoujście dissolved after the 2014–15 season.
4. Limanovia withdrew from the competition, citing financial difficulties.

== Round and draw dates ==
Round	Draw date	First leg	Second leg
Preliminary round	17 June 2015	18–19 July 2015	—
First round	17 June 2015	25–26 July 2015	—
Round of 32	23 July 2015	12 August 2015	—
Round of 16	23 July 2015	23 September 2015	—
Quarter-finals	23 July 2015	28 October 2015	18 November 2015
Semi-finals	16 December 2015	30 March 2016	20 April 2016
Final	16 December 2015	2 May 2016 at the National Stadium, Warsaw	—

Source: 90minut.pl

== Preliminary round ==
The draw for this round was conducted at the headquarters of the Polish FA on 17 June 2015. Participating in this round were 16 regional cup winners, 18 teams from the 2014–15 II Liga and 6 lowest ranked teams from the 2014–15 I Liga. The matches were played on 18, 19 and 22 July 2015.

16 of the 24 I Liga and II Liga teams participating in the preliminary round were drawn against the 16 regional cup winners, and the remaining 8 were drawn against each other. Games were hosted by teams playing in the lower division in the 2015–16 season (Note: Regional cup winners were assured to be hosts of both the preliminary round and the first round games, regardless of their and their opponents' relative position in the league pyramid. However, all regional cup winners happened to be drawn against either teams playing in higher divisions or teams that subsequently withdrew from the competition.). The host of Znicz Pruszków vs. Nadwiślan Góra (both playing in II Liga) game was determined by the order in which the teams were drawn.

Team 1	Score	Team 2
18 July 2015
Stilon Gorzów Wielkopolski (4)	3–2	Kotwica Kołobrzeg (3)
Gwardia Koszalin (4)	1–3	Błękitni Stargard Szczeciński (3)
Resovia Rzeszów (4)	1–2	Puszcza Niepołomice (3)
Odra Opole (4)	0–1	Pogoń Siedlce (2)
Chełmianka Chełm (4)	0–1	Siarka Tarnobrzeg (3)
Olimpia Olsztynek (4)	1–3	Legionovia Legionowo (3)
Grunwald Ruda Śląska (4)	2–4 (a.e.t.)	Stal Stalowa Wola (3)
KKS 1925 Kalisz (4)	1–4	Wisła Puławy (3)
Znicz Pruszków (3)	0–1	Nadwiślan Góra (3)
Stal Mielec (3)	0–2	Rozwój Katowice (2)
Górnik Wałbrzych (4)	1–1 (a.e.t.) (3–0 p)	Okocimski KS Brzesko (3)
KS ROW 1964 Rybnik (3)	2–0	MKS Kluczbork (2)
19 July 2015
Wisła Sandomierz (4)	0–1	Sandecja Nowy Sącz (2)
ŁKS Łomża (4)	2–1	Raków Częstochowa (3)
Ślęza Wrocław (4)	0–1	Bytovia Bytów (2)
Ursus Warszawa (4)	0–1	Zagłębie Sosnowiec (2)
22 July 2015
Garbarnia Kraków (4)	2–0	GKS Tychy (3)
No match
Rodło Kwidzyn (5)	3–0 (awarded)^{1}	Flota Świnoujście (dissolved)^{1}
Boruta Zgierz (5)	3–0 (awarded)^{2}	Widzew Łódź (dissolved)^{2}
Wda Świecie (4)	3–0 (awarded)^{3}	Limanovia Limanowa (6)

Notes

- Note 1: Flota Świnoujście dissolved after the 2014–2015 season and withdrew from the Polish Cup. The successor club plays in the Szczecin I group of the A klasa (8th tier)
- Note 2: Widzew Łódź dissolved after the 2014–2015 season and withdrew from the Polish Cup. The successor club plays in the Łódź Voivodeship IV Liga (5th tier)
- Note 3: Limanovia withdrew from the competition, citing financial difficulties.

== First round ==
The draw for this round was conducted at the headquarters of the Polish FA on 17 June 2015. The matches were played on 25, 26, 28 and 29 July 2015. Participating in this round were the 20 winners from the previous round and 12 highest ranked teams from the 2014–15 I Liga.

The 12 teams joining in this round were seeded and their opponents were drawn from the 20 winners of the preliminary round (the other 8 formed the remaining 4 matches). Games will be hosted by teams playing in the lower division in the 2015–16 season. Hosts of matches between teams playing in the same tier were decided by a draw conducted on 20 July 2015, with the exception of the Katowice derby, where both teams agreed to play on GKS's Stadion Miejski.

Team 1	Score	Team 2
25 July 2015
Górnik Wałbrzych (4)	0–2	Wigry Suwałki (2)
KS ROW 1964 Rybnik (3)	0–4	Dolcan Ząbki (2)
Siarka Tarnobrzeg (3)	1–4	Chojniczanka Chojnice (2)
Rodło Kwidzyn (5)	2–4 (a.e.t.)	Olimpia Grudziądz (2)
Stomil Olsztyn (2)	2–0	Sandecja Nowy Sącz (2)
Arka Gdynia (2)	4–1	Pogoń Siedlce (2)
Boruta Zgierz (5)	0–3	Puszcza Niepołomice (3)
Wda Świecie (4)	1–0	Legionovia Legionowo (3)
Stilon Gorzów Wielkopolski (4)	0–1	Stal Stalowa Wola (3)
Wisła Puławy (3)	2–2 (a.e.t.) (2–4 p)	Zagłębie Sosnowiec (2)
26 July 2015
Wisła Płock (2)	1–2	Bytovia Bytów (2)
Garbarnia Kraków (4)	0–2	Miedź Legnica (2)
ŁKS Łomża (4)	0–0 (a.e.t.) (6–7 p)	Chrobry Głogów (2)
GKS Katowice (2)	2–0	Rozwój Katowice (2)
28 July 2015
Nadwiślan Góra (3)	0–3	Zagłębie Lubin (1)
29 July 2015
Błękitni Stargard Szczeciński (3)	2–1	Termalica Bruk-Bet Nieciecza (1)

== Bracket ==
Round of 32
Jagiellonia Białystok	2
Pogoń Szczecin	1
Błękitni Stargard Szczeciński	2
Zagłębie Lubin	4
Olimpia Grudziądz	0
Lech Poznań	2
Ruch Chorzów	2
Wisła Kraków	1
Zagłębie Sosnowiec	3
Górnik Zabrze	1
Wda Świecie	3
Korona Kielce	0
Dolcan Ząbki	2
Cracovia	3
Wigry Suwałki	0
GKS Katowice	2
GKS Bełchatów	1
Bytovia Bytów	0
Arka Gdynia	1 (2)
Chojniczanka Chojnice	1 (3)
Puszcza Niepołomice	1
Lechia Gdańsk	5
Górnik Łęczna	0
Legia Warsaw	2
Zawisza Bydgoszcz	4
Chrobry Głogów	1
Stal Stalowa Wola	2 (3)
Piast Gliwice	2 (0)
Miedź Legnica	1
Podbeskidzie Bielsko-Biała	2
Stomil Olsztyn	1
Śląsk Wrocław	5

Round of 16
Jagiellonia Białystok	0
Zagłębie Lubin	2
Lech Poznań	1
Ruch Chorzów	0
Zagłębie Sosnowiec	4
Wda Świecie	1
Cracovia	3
GKS Katowice	1
GKS Bełchatów	1
Chojniczanka Chojnice	2
Lechia Gdańsk	1
Legia Warsaw	4
Zawisza Bydgoszcz	2
Stal Stalowa Wola	1
Podbeskidzie Bielsko-Biała	0
Śląsk Wrocław	1

Quarterfinals
Zagłębie Lubin	0	0
Lech Poznań	1	1
Zagłębie Sosnowiec	1	2
Cracovia	2	0
Chojniczanka Chojnice	1	1
Legia Warsaw	2	4
Zawisza Bydgoszcz	0	2
Śląsk Wrocław	0	1

Semifinals
Lech Poznań	1	1
Zagłębie Sosnowiec	0	1
Legia Warsaw	4	2
Zawisza Bydgoszcz	0	1

Final
Lech Poznań	0
Legia Warsaw	1

== Round of 32 ==
The draw for this round was conducted at the PGE Narodowy on 23 July 2015. The matches were played on 11, 12 and 13 August 2015. Participating in this round are the 16 winners from the previous round and 16 teams from the 2014–15 Ekstraklasa.

Team 1	Score	Team 2
11 August 2015
Błękitni Stargard Szczeciński (3)	2–4	Zagłębie Lubin (1)
Olimpia Grudziądz (2)	0–2	Lech Poznań (1)
Wda Świecie (4)	3–0 (awarded)	Korona Kielce (1)
Dolcan Ząbki (2)	2–3	Cracovia (1)
12 August 2015
Jagiellonia Białystok (1)	2–1	Pogoń Szczecin (1)
Zawisza Bydgoszcz (2)	4–1	Chrobry Głogów (2)
Stal Stalowa Wola (3)	2–2 (a.e.t.) (3–0 p)	Piast Gliwice (1)
Stomil Olsztyn (2)	1–5	Śląsk Wrocław (1)
GKS Bełchatów (2)	1–0	Bytovia Bytów (2)
Arka Gdynia (2)	1–1 (a.e.t.) (2–3 p)	Chojniczanka Chojnice (2)
Puszcza Niepołomice (3)	1–5	Lechia Gdańsk (1)
Górnik Łęczna (1)	0–2	Legia Warsaw (1)
Zagłębie Sosnowiec (2)	3–1	Górnik Zabrze (1)
Wigry Suwałki (2)	0–2	GKS Katowice (2)
13 August 2015
Ruch Chorzów (1)	2–1	Wisła Kraków (1)
Miedź Legnica (2)	1–2 (a.e.t.)	Podbeskidzie Bielsko-Biała (1)

11 August 2015	Błękitni Stargard Szczeciński	2–4	Zagłębie Lubin	Stargard Szczeciński
17:00 CEST (UTC+02:00)	Wiśniewski 23', 53'		Sobków 52', 90+1'; Janus 71', 77'	Stadium: Stadion Miejski; Attendance: 2,000; Referee: Tomasz Białek (Drezdenko)

11 August 2015	Wda Świecie	3–0; Awarded	Korona Kielce	Świecie
17:00 CEST (UTC+02:00)			Grzelak 80' (pen.)	Stadium: Stadion Miejski; Attendance: 981; Referee: Krzysztof Korycki (Warsaw)
Note: PZPN awarded Wda a 3–0 win due to Korona Kielce fielding ineligible player. The original match had ended in a 1–0 win for Korona.

11 August 2015	Dolcan Ząbki	2–3	Cracovia	Ząbki
17:00 CEST (UTC+02:00)	Świerblewski 2'; Matuszek 26'		Kapustka 1'; Zjawiński 47', 67'	Stadium: Stadion Dolcanu; Attendance: 450; Referee: Piotr Idzik (Poznań)

11 August 2015	Olimpia Grudziądz	0–2	Lech Poznań	Grudziądz
18:00 CEST (UTC+02:00)			Holman 9', 86'	Stadium: Bronisław Malinowski Stadium; Attendance: 4,000; Referee: Marek Opaliński (Legnica)

12 August 2015	Puszcza Niepołomice	1–5	Lechia Gdańsk	Niepołomice
17:00 CEST (UTC+02:00)	Gębalski 38' (pen.)		Wiśniewski 20', 36'; Makuszewski 44'; Pawłowski 49', 74'	Stadium: Stadion Puszczy; Attendance: 1,716; Referee: Sebastian Jarzębak (Bytom)

12 August 2015	Stal Stalowa Wola	2–2 (a.e.t.) (3–0 p)	Piast Gliwice	Stalowa Wola
17:00 CEST (UTC+02:00)	Łanucha 37' (pen.); Płonka 90+2'		Badía 15', 64'	Stadium: Stadion MOSiR; Attendance: 1,500; Referee: Mateusz Złotnicki (Lublin)
	Penalties
	Jabłoński (penalty scored); Płonka (penalty scored); Łanucha (penalty scored)		(penalty missed) Klepczyński; (penalty missed) Korun; (penalty missed) Mokwa

12 August 2015	Jagiellonia Białystok	2–1	Pogoń Szczecin	Białystok
17:30 CEST (UTC+02:00)	Świderski 25'; Frankowski 50'		Frączczak 42'	Stadium: Stadion Miejski; Attendance: 7,123; Referee: Paweł Raczkowski (Warsaw)

12 August 2015	Zawisza Bydgoszcz	4–1	Chrobry Głogów	Bydgoszcz
18:00 CEST (UTC+02:00)	Lewicki 26', 39'; Nykiel 60'; Drygas 79' (pen.)		Machaj 71'	Stadium: Zdzisław Krzyszkowiak Stadium; Attendance: 400; Referee: Łukasz Bednarek (Koszalin)

12 August 2015	Arka Gdynia	1–1 (a.e.t.) (2–3 p)	Chojniczanka Chojnice	Gdynia
18:30 CEST (UTC+02:00)	Renusz 45'		Mikołajczak 79'	Stadium: Stadion GOSiR; Attendance: 3,796; Referee: Artur Aluszyk (Szczecin)
	Penalties
	Łukasiewicz (penalty missed); Stolc (penalty scored); Fialho (penalty scored); Siemaszko (penalty missed); Szerszeń (penalty missed)		(penalty missed) Rybski; (penalty scored) Mikołajczak; (penalty scored) Grzelak; (penalty missed) Zawistowski; (penalty scored) Rogalski

12 August 2015	Wigry Suwałki	0–2	GKS Katowice	Suwałki
19:00 CEST (UTC+02:00)			Wołkowicz 3'; Trochim 51'	Stadium: Stadion Miejski; Attendance: 2,100; Referee: Jacek Małyszek (Lublin)

12 August 2015	Zagłębie Sosnowiec	3–1	Górnik Zabrze	Sosnowiec
19:00 CEST (UTC+02:00)	Sołowiej 55'; Markowski 65'; Fidziukiewicz 87'		Iwan 22'	Stadium: Stadion Ludowy; Attendance: 4,500; Referee: Tomasz Wajda (Żywiec)

12 August 2015	Stomil Olsztyn	1–5	Śląsk Wrocław	Olsztyn
19:45 CEST (UTC+02:00)	Remisz 22'		Celeban 6'; Biliński 12'; Grajciar 26'; Paixão 76'; Machaj 90+2' (pen.)	Stadium: Stadion OSiR; Attendance: 2,833; Referee: Paweł Pskit (Łódź)

12 August 2015	GKS Bełchatów	1–0	Bytovia Bytów	Bełchatów
20:00 CEST (UTC+02:00)	Rachwał 90+1' (pen.)			Stadium: GIEKSA Arena; Attendance: 1,128; Referee: Łukasz Szczech (Warsaw)

12 August 2015	Górnik Łęczna	0–2	Legia Warsaw	Łęczna
20:30 CEST (UTC+02:00)			Saganowski 72'; Prijović 82'	Stadium: Stadion Górnika; Attendance: 4,500; Referee: Sebastian Krasny (Kraków)

13 August 2015	Miedź Legnica	1–2 (a.e.t.)	Podbeskidzie Bielsko-Biała	Legnica
18:00 CEST (UTC+02:00)	Telichowski 57'		Hiszpański 22'; Kolčák 103'	Stadium: Stadion im. Orła Białego; Attendance: 2,000; Referee: Zbigniew Dobrynin (Łódź)

13 August 2015	Ruch Chorzów	2–1	Wisła Kraków	Chorzów
20:00 CEST (UTC+02:00)	Lipski 21'; Višņakovs 88'		Jankowski 90+2'	Stadium: Stadion Ruchu; Attendance: 6,504; Referee: Bartosz Frankowski (Toruń)

== Round of 16 ==
Competing in this round were the 16 winners from the previous round. The draw for this round was conducted at the National Stadium, Warsaw on 23 July 2015. Matches were played on 15, 16, 22–24 September 2015. Hosts of matches between teams playing in the same tier were decided by a draw conducted on 14 August 2015.

Team 1	Score	Team 2
15 September 2015
Wda Świecie (4)	1–4	Zagłębie Sosnowiec (2)
16 September 2015
Stal Stalowa Wola (3)	1–2	Zawisza Bydgoszcz (2)
22 September 2015
Podbeskidzie Bielsko-Biała (1)	0–1	Śląsk Wrocław (1)
GKS Katowice (2)	1–3	Cracovia (1)
23 September 2015
Jagiellonia Białystok (1)	0–2	Zagłębie Lubin (1)
Lech Poznań (1)	1–0	Ruch Chorzów (1)
24 September 2015
Chojniczanka Chojnice (2)	2–1 (a.e.t.)	GKS Bełchatów (2)
Legia Warsaw (1)	4–1	Lechia Gdańsk (1)

15 September 2015	Wda Świecie	1–4	Zagłębie Sosnowiec	Świecie
15:30 CEST (UTC+02:00)	Urbański 13'		Zaradny 32'; Paluchowski 43'; Pribula 53'; Szatan 63'	Stadium: Stadion Miejski; Attendance: 986; Referee: Łukasz Bednarek (Koszalin)

16 September 2015	Stal Stalowa Wola	1–2	Zawisza Bydgoszcz	Stalowa Wola
15:30 CEST (UTC+02:00)	Jabłoński 80'		Mica 28'; Drygas 48'	Stadium: Stadion MOSiR; Attendance: 1,376; Referee: Mateusz Złotnicki (Lublin)

22 September 2015	GKS Katowice	1–3	Cracovia	Katowice
17:45 CEST (UTC+02:00)	Goncerz 79' (pen.)		Čovilo 19'; Jendrišek 70'; Czerwiński 84' (o.g.)	Stadium: Stadion GKS Katowice; Attendance: 2,600; Referee: Marek Opaliński (Legnica)

22 September 2015	Podbeskidzie Bielsko-Biała	0–1	Śląsk Wrocław	Bielsko-Biała
20:30 CEST (UTC+02:00)			Gecov 58'	Stadium: Stadion Miejski; Attendance: 3,059; Referee: Tomasz Kwiatkowski (Warsaw)

23 September 2015	Jagiellonia Białystok	0–2	Zagłębie Lubin	Białystok
17:45 CEST (UTC+02:00)			Papadopulos 16'; K. Piątek 31'	Stadium: Stadion Miejski; Attendance: 8,813; Referee: Krzysztof Jakubik (Siedlce)

23 September 2015	Lech Poznań	1–0	Ruch Chorzów	Poznań
20:30 CEST (UTC+02:00)	Grodzicki 50' (o.g.)			Stadium: INEA Stadion; Attendance: 11,273; Referee: Marcin Borski (Warsaw)

24 September 2015	Chojniczanka Chojnice	2–1 (a.e.t.)	GKS Bełchatów	Chojnice
17:45 CEST (UTC+02:00)	Rybski 25'; Rogalski 114'		Zgarda 75'	Stadium: Stadion Miejski; Attendance: 1,100; Referee: Dominik Sulikowski (Gdańsk)

24 September 2015	Legia Warsaw	4–1	Lechia Gdańsk	Warsaw
20:30 CEST (UTC+02:00)	Prijović 24', 85'; Nikolić 62'; Lewczuk 75'		Mak 76'	Stadium: Polish Army Stadium; Attendance: 18,289; Referee: Jarosław Przybył (Kluczbork)

== Quarter-finals ==
The 8 winners from Round of 16 competed in this round. The matches were played in two legs. The first leg took place on the 27 and 28 October 2015. The second leg took place on 18–19 November and 16 December 2015. The draw for this round was conducted at the National Stadium, Warsaw on 23 July 2015. Host of first match between teams playing in the same tier were decided by a draw conducted on 28 September 2015.

Team 1	Agg.	Team 2	1st leg	2nd leg
Zagłębie Lubin (1)	0–2	Lech Poznań (1)	0–1	0–1
Zawisza Bydgoszcz (2)	2–1	Śląsk Wrocław (1)	0–0	2–1
Chojniczanka Chojnice (2)	2–6	Legia Warsaw (1)	1–2	1–4
Zagłębie Sosnowiec (2)	3–2	Cracovia (1)	1–2	2–0

=== First leg ===
27 October 2015	Zawisza Bydgoszcz	0–0	Śląsk Wrocław	Bydgoszcz
18:00 CET (UTC+01:00)				Stadium: Zdzisław Krzyszkowiak Stadium; Attendance: 1,483; Referee: Paweł Raczkowski (Warsaw)

27 October 2015	Zagłębie Sosnowiec	1–2	Cracovia	Sosnowiec
20:30 CET (UTC+01:00)	Fidziukiewicz 43'		Čovilo 22'; Rakeļs 90'	Stadium: Stadion Ludowy; Attendance: 1,360; Referee: Marcin Borski (Warsaw)

28 October 2015	Chojniczanka Chojnice	1–2	Legia Warsaw	Chojnice
18:00 CET (UTC+01:00)	Mikita 48'		Vranješ 23'; Duda 78'	Stadium: Stadion Miejski; Attendance: 4,832; Referee: Tomasz Wajda (Żywiec)

28 October 2015	Zagłębie Lubin	0–1	Lech Poznań	Lubin
20:30 CET (UTC+01:00)			Arajuuri 81'	Stadium: Stadion Zagłębia Lubin; Attendance: 4,587; Referee: Paweł Gil (Lublin)

=== Second leg ===
18 November 2015	Legia Warsaw	4–1 (6–2 agg.)	Chojniczanka Chojnice	Warsaw
20:45 CET (UTC+01:00)	Vranješ 29'; Prijović 33'; Brzyski 38'; Nikolić 63'		Rybski 5'	Stadium: Polish Army Stadium; Attendance: 8,368; Referee: Jacek Lis (Ruda Śląska)

19 November 2015	Cracovia	0–2 (2–3 agg.)	Zagłębie Sosnowiec	Kraków
17:45 CET (UTC+01:00)			Pribula 26'; Dudek 40' (pen.)	Stadium: Marshal Józef Piłsudski Stadium; Attendance: 3,436; Referee: Zbigniew Dobrynin (Łódź)

19 November 2015	Lech Poznań	1–0 (2–0 agg.)	Zagłębie Lubin	Poznań
20:45 CET (UTC+01:00)	Pawłowski 90+3'			Stadium: INEA Stadion; Attendance: 9,271; Referee: Jarosław Przybył (Kluczbork)

16 December 2015	Śląsk Wrocław	1–2 (1–2 agg.)	Zawisza Bydgoszcz	Wrocław
20:00 CET (UTC+01:00)	Biliński 74'		Lewicki 69'; Drygas 78'	Stadium: Stadion Miejski; Attendance: 3,234; Referee: Tomasz Wajda (Żywiec)

== Semi-finals ==
The 4 winners from Quarterfinals will compete in this round. The matches will be played in two legs. The first leg took place on 15–16 March 2016. The second leg took place on 5–6 April 2016. The draw for this round was conducted at Stadion Miejski, Wrocław on 16 December 2015.

Team 1	Agg.	Team 2	1st leg	2nd leg
Lech Poznań (1)	2–1	Zagłębie Sosnowiec (2)	1–0	1–1
Legia Warsaw (1)	6–1	Zawisza Bydgoszcz (2)	4–0	2–1

=== First leg ===
15 March 2016	Lech Poznań	1–0	Zagłębie Sosnowiec	Poznań
18:30 CET (UTC+01:00)	Volkov 38'			Stadium: INEA Stadion; Attendance: 12,885; Referee: Jarosław Przybył (Kluczbork)

16 March 2016	Legia Warsaw	4–0	Zawisza Bydgoszcz	Warsaw
18:30 CET (UTC+01:00)	Nikolić 6', 63', 79'; Broź 50'			Stadium: Polish Army Stadium; Attendance: 14,912; Referee: Krzysztof Jakubik (Siedlce)

=== Second leg ===
5 April 2016	Zagłębie Sosnowiec	1–1 (1–2 agg.)	Lech Poznań	Sosnowiec
18:00 CEST (UTC+02:00)	Paluchowski 82'		Gajos 70'	Stadium: Stadion Ludowy; Attendance: 4,950; Referee: Bartosz Frankowski (Toruń)

6 April 2016	Zawisza Bydgoszcz	1–2 (1–6 agg.)	Legia Warsaw	Bydgoszcz
18:00 CEST (UTC+02:00)	Danielak 60'		Nikolić 16'; Guilherme 79'	Stadium: Zdzisław Krzyszkowiak Stadium; Attendance: 2,000; Referee: Hiroyuki Kimura (Japan)

== Final ==
The final match was played at the Stadion Narodowy, Warsaw on 2 May 2016.

2 May 2016
16:00 CEST (UTC+02:00)

Lech Poznań	0–1	Legia Warsaw
	Report	Prijović 69'

Stadion Narodowy, Warsaw
Attendance: 48,563
Referee: Szymon Marciniak (Płock)

Lech Poznań	Legia Warsaw

GK	1	(Bosnia and Herzegovina) Jasmin Burić
RB	4	(Poland) Tomasz Kędziora
CB	23	(Finland) Paulus Arajuuri
CB	35	(Poland) Marcin Kamiński
LB	5	(Hungary) Tamás Kádár
CM	6	(Poland) Łukasz Trałka (c)	(yellow card) 56'	(substituted off) 79'
CM	55	(Ghana) Abdul Aziz Tetteh
RM	11	(Hungary) Gergő Lovrencsics		(substituted off) 90+2'
AM	7	(Poland) Karol Linetty
LM	8	(Poland) Szymon Pawłowski	(yellow card) 42'
CF	24	(Poland) Dawid Kownacki		(substituted off) 88'
Substitutes:
GK	27	(Poland) Krzysztof Kotorowski
DF	3	(Montenegro) Vladimir Volkov
MF	10	(Switzerland) Darko Jevtić		(substituted on) 88'
MF	14	(Poland) Maciej Gajos		(substituted on) 79'
DF	21	(The Gambia) Kebba Ceesay
DF	26	(Poland) Maciej Wilusz
MF	29	(Poland) Kamil Jóźwiak		(substituted on) 90+2'
Manager:
(Poland) Jan Urban

GK	1	(Poland) Arkadiusz Malarz
RB	5	(Poland) Artur Jędrzejczyk
CB	4	(Poland) Igor Lewczuk
CB	2	(Poland) Michał Pazdan (c)	(yellow card) 90+3'
LB	14	(Czech Republic) Adam Hloušek
RM	8	(Slovakia) Ondrej Duda		(substituted off) 67'
CM	7	(Poland) Ariel Borysiuk
CM	3	(Poland) Tomasz Jodłowiec
LM	18	(Poland) Michał Kucharczyk
FW	99	(Serbia) Aleksandar Prijović	(yellow card) 38'	(substituted off) 90'
FW	9	(Hungary) Nemanja Nikolić		(substituted off) 83'
Substitutes:
GK	33	(Poland) Radosław Cierzniak
MF	6	(Brazil) Guilherme	(yellow card) 90+11'	(substituted on) 67'
DF	17	(Poland) Tomasz Brzyski
DF	19	(Poland) Bartosz Bereszyński
MF	22	(Finland) Kasper Hämäläinen		(substituted on) 90'
MF	23	(Bosnia and Herzegovina) Stojan Vranješ
MF	77	(Bulgaria) Mihail Aleksandrov		(substituted on) 83'
Manager:
(Russia) Stanislav Cherchesov

Match officials:
Referee:
Szymon Marciniak
Assistant referees:
Paweł Sokolnicki
Tomasz Listkiewicz
Additional assistant referees:
Paweł Raczkowski
Tomasz Musiał
Fourth official:
Radosław Siejka

Match rules

- 90 minutes.
- 30 minutes of extra-time if necessary.
- Penalty shoot-out if scores still level.
- Seven named substitutes.
- Maximum of three substitutions.

== Top goalscorers ==
As of matches played 2 May 2016.

Rank	Player	Club	Goals
1	(Hungary) Nemanja Nikolić	Legia Warsaw	6
2	(Switzerland) Aleksandar Prijović	Legia Warsaw	5
3	(Poland) Kamil Drygas	Zawisza Bydgoszcz	3
3	(Poland) Szymon Lewicki	Zawisza Bydgoszcz	3
3	(Poland) Damian Łanucha	Stal Stalowa Wola	3
3	(Poland) Szymon Matuszek	Dolcan Ząbki	3
3	(Poland) Eryk Sobków	Zagłębie Lubin	3
3	(Poland) Radosław Wiśniewski	Błękitni Stargard Szczeciński	3

== See also ==
- 2015–16 Ekstraklasa
- 2015–16 I Liga
