= 2016–17 I liga =

I liga
- Season: 2016–17
- Dates: 29 July 2016 – 4 June 2017
- Champions: Sandecja Nowy Sącz
- Promoted: Sandecja Nowy Sącz; Górnik Zabrze
- Relegated: Wisła Puławy; Znicz Pruszków; MKS Kluczbork
- Matches: 306
- Goals: 799 (2.61 per match)
- Top goalscorer: Igor Angulo (17 goals)
- Biggest home win: Wigry 6–0 Stal (28 August 2016)
- Biggest away win: Wisła 1–5 Miedź (8 październik 2016); Pogoń 0–4 Miedź (5 November 2016); Kluczbork 0–4 Zagłębie (8 April 2017); Stomil 0–4 Stal (15 April 2017)
- Highest scoring: Chojniczanka 5–4 Stomil (6 August 2016); Podbeskidzie 4–5 Zagłębie (16 September 2016); Znicz 4–5 Wigry (25 November 2016)
- Longest winning run: 8 matches Sandecja
- Longest unbeaten run: 18 matches Chojniczanka
- Longest winless run: 14 matches Kluczbork
- Longest losing run: 6 matches Tychy
- Highest attendance: 20,987; Górnik 1–0 Katowice (16 May 2017)
- Lowest attendance: 250; Znicz 1–3 Sandecja (21 October 2016)
- Total attendance: 790,237
- Average attendance: 2,583 ▲52.1%

The 2016–17 I liga (currently named Nice I liga due to sponsorship reasons) was the 9th season of the Polish I liga under its current title, and the 69th season of the second highest division in the Polish football league system since its establishment in 1949. The league is operated by the Polish Football Association (PZPN). The league is contested by 18 teams. The regular season was played in a round-robin tournament. The season began on 29 July 2016, and concluded on 4 June 2017. After the 19th matchday the league will be on winter break between 28 November 2016 and 2 March 2017.

According to the competition rules, all clubs are required to field at least one youth player (born in 1996 or later and Polish or trained in Poland) in every game (except for the times when the only youth player on the roster is sent off or unable to continue playing).

== Changes from last season ==
The following teams have changed division since the 2015–16 season.

=== To I liga ===
Relegated from Ekstraklasa

- Górnik Zabrze
- Podbeskidzie Bielsko-Biała

Promoted from II liga

- Stal Mielec
- Znicz Pruszków
- GKS Tychy
- Wisła Puławy

=== From I liga ===
Promoted to Ekstraklasa

- Arka Gdynia
- Wisła Płock

Relegated to II liga

- GKS Bełchatów
- Rozwój Katowice

Dissolved

- Zawisza Bydgoszcz

Withdrew

- Dolcan Ząbki

== Team overview ==
Location of teams and stadiums in 2016–17 I liga
Location of teams in the Metropolis GZM in 2022-23 I liga.

=== Stadiums and locations ===
Team	Stadium	Capacity
Bytovia Bytów	Stadion MOSiR	1,500
Chojniczanka Chojnice	Stadion Miejski Chojniczanka 1930	3,000
Chrobry Głogów	Stadion GOS	2,817
GKS Katowice	Stadion GKS Katowice	6,710
GKS Tychy	Stadion Tychy	15,300
Górnik Zabrze	Ernest Pohl Stadium	24,413^{1}
Miedź Legnica	Stadion Orła Białego	6,244
MKS Kluczbork	Stadion Miejski	2,776
Olimpia Grudziądz	Stadion im. Bronisława Malinowskiego	5,000
Podbeskidzie Bielsko-Biała	Stadion BBOSiR	15,316
Pogoń Siedlce	Stadion ROSRRiT	2,901
Sandecja Nowy Sącz	Stadion im. Ojca Władysława Augustynka	2,850
Stal Mielec	Stadion MOSiR	6,800
Stomil Olsztyn	OSiR Stadium	3,500
Wigry Suwałki	Stadion OSiR	3,060
Wisła Puławy	Stadion MOSiR	4,418
Zagłębie Sosnowiec	Stadium Ludowy	7,500
Znicz Pruszków	Stadion MZOS Znicz	1,977

1. Upgrading to 31,871.

== League table ==
Pos	Team	Pld	W	D	L	GF	GA	GD	Pts	Promotion or Relegation
1	Sandecja Nowy Sącz (C, P)	34	18	7	9	50	29	+21	61	Promotion to Ekstraklasa
2	Górnik Zabrze (P)	34	17	7	10	53	34	+19	58	Promotion to Ekstraklasa
3	Zagłębie Sosnowiec	34	16	9	9	53	44	+9	57 (Note: Head-to-head record: Zagłębie 1–0 Miedź, Miedź 2–1 Zagłębie.)	
4	Miedź Legnica	34	16	9	9	49	27	+22	57	
5	Chojniczanka Chojnice	34	13	17	4	54	48	+6	56 (Note: Head-to-head record: Chojniczanka 3–1 Olimpia, Olimpia 0–1 Chojniczanka .)	
6	Olimpia Grudziądz	34	17	5	12	48	35	+13	56	
7	GKS Katowice	34	15	9	10	47	32	+15	54	
8	Podbeskidzie Bielsko-Biała	34	14	11	9	40	39	+1	53	
9	Wigry Suwałki	34	15	7	12	51	45	+6	52	
10	Stal Mielec	34	12	9	13	39	42	−3	45	
11	Pogoń Siedlce	34	13	5	16	34	46	−12	44	
12	Chrobry Głogów	34	12	7	15	50	50	0	43	
13	Stomil Olsztyn (Note: Stomil Olsztyn were punished with a deduction of three points for failing with licensing requirements.)	34	9	13	12	48	50	−2	37 (Note: Head-to-head record: Stomil 4–0 Tychy. Tychy 2–2 Stomil.)	
14	GKS Tychy	34	10	7	17	42	52	−10	37	
15	Bytovia Bytów (O)	34	8	11	15	38	47	−9	35	Qualification to play-off
16	Wisła Puławy (R)	34	7	12	15	33	49	−16	33	Relegation to II liga
17	Znicz Pruszków (R)	34	8	6	20	35	64	−29	30	Relegation to II liga
18	MKS Kluczbork (R)	34	4	13	17	35	66	−31	25	Relegation to II liga

Source: 90minut.pl
Rules for classification: 1. points won; 2. points in head-to-head matches; 3. goal difference in hth matches; 4. goals scored in hth matches; 5. away goals in hth matches (only if two teams are tied); 6. total goal difference; 7. total goals scored; 8. fairplay ranking.
(C) Champions; (O) Play-off winners; (P) Promoted; (R) Relegated

== Positions by round ==
Team / Round	1	2	3	4	5	6	7	8	9	10	11	12	13	14	15	16	17	18	19	20	21	22	23	24	25	26	27	28	29	30	31	32	33	34
Sandecja	8	10	6	7	5	3	3	4	2	4	5	5	5	4	4	5	4	4	4	4	3	4	4	5	4	1	1	1	1	1	1	1	1	1
Górnik	14	13	17	11	14	15	14	10	11	11	10	8	6	6	9	8	8	8	8	8	8	7	8	9	8	8	8	9	9	9	6	4	2	2
Zagłębie	6	4	5	3	3	2	2	1	1	1	1	1	1	1	1	3	3	3	3	3	5	2	1	2	2	2	2	2	2	4	2	2	4	3
Miedź	3	5	7	10	10	12	10	7	7	8	8	7	10	10	7	4	7	6	5	6	6	5	6	7	7	6	5	7	8	6	8	6	5	4
Chojniczanka	6	3	4	5	4	4	5	5	4	2	2	3	3	3	3	2	1	1	1	1	1	1	2	1	1	3	2	3	4	7	3	5	3	5
Olimpia	17	17	18	13	12	9	12	15	16	13	15	13	11	13	12	15	12	10	9	7	9	8	5	4	6	5	3	5	5	2	5	3	7	6
Katowice	14	7	8	9	8	6	4	3	5	3	3	2	2	2	2	1	2	2	2	2	2	3	3	3	3	4	6	4	3	3	4	7	6	7
Podbeskidzie	1	1	1	2	2	5	7	6	6	7	9	10	9	9	10	9	10	12	10	10	10	10	11	11	10	9	9	8	7	8	9	8	8	8
Wigry	3	2	2	1	1	1	1	2	3	5	6	6	8	8	8	11	9	7	7	5	4	6	7	6	5	7	7	6	6	5	7	9	9	9
Stal	8	10	11	14	15	16	17	17	18	18	18	16	16	16	15	13	14	14	14	14	11	12	10	10	11	11	10	11	11	10	10	10	10	10
Pogoń	3	8	13	15	17	17	15	11	8	10	7	9	7	7	5	6	5	5	6	9	7	9	9	8	9	10	11	10	10	11	11	11	12	11
Chrobry	18	18	16	18	16	14	13	13	13	12	13	11	12	14	13	12	13	11	12	12	13	15	13	13	13	12	13	12	12	12	13	12	11	12
Stomil	12	15	14	16	13	8	8	12	12	9	12	12	13	12	11	7	11	13	13	13	12	11	12	12	12	13	12	13	13	13	12	13	13	13
Tychy	14	13	9	8	9	11	6	8	10	14	11	14	15	15	16	17	16	17	15	16	15	16	15	15	15	15	14	14	14	14	14	14	14	14
Bytovia	2	9	12	6	7	10	11	9	9	6	4	4	4	5	6	10	6	9	11	11	14	14	16	16	16	16	16	16	16	17	16	16	15	15
Wisła	8	6	3	4	6	7	9	14	14	15	14	15	14	11	14	14	15	15	16	15	16	13	14	14	14	14	15	15	15	15	15	15	16	16
Znicz	13	16	15	17	18	18	18	18	17	17	17	17	18	18	17	16	17	16	17	17	17	17	17	17	17	17	17	17	17	16	17	17	17	17
Kluczbork	8	12	10	11	11	13	16	16	15	16	16	18	17	17	18	18	18	18	18	18	18	18	18	18	18	18	18	18	18	18	18	18	18	18

== Results ==
Home \ Away	BYT	CCH	GŁO	KAT	TYC	GÓR	MLE	KLU	GRU	PBB	PSI	SNS	STA	STO	WIG	WPU	ZSO	ZNI
Bytovia Bytów		0–1	2–1	1–0	1–1	0–1	1–0	2–0	0–0	0–2	1–3	2–0	2–2	1–0	1–1	0–1	0–1	0–1
Chojniczanka Chojnice	1–1		2–2	2–2	1–4	1–1	0–0	1–1	3–1	1–1	2–1	1–2	2–0	5–4	3–2	3–3	2–2	1–1
Chrobry Głogów	3–3	1–3		0–2	2–2	2–0	1–1	3–0	1–3	0–2	2–0	2–1	0–1	3–0	2–1	1–2	1–0	1–1
GKS Katowice	1–1	1–1	2–1		3–0	1–1	0–2	2–3	1–0	1–2	1–0	0–1	1–0	2–2	0–1	2–1	0–0	2–0
GKS Tychy	1–0	0–2	0–2	1–0		2–1	0–2	4–2	1–1	0–1	0–1	2–1	1–4	2–2	2–1	2–0	3–0	4–1
Górnik Zabrze	0–0	6–1	2–1	1–0	1–0		0–2	4–2	2–1	4–0	2–0	2–0	1–1	2–0	0–0	4–0	1–2	0–1
Miedź Legnica	2–1	2–0	1–2	2–2	3–2	1–0		2–0	0–0	1–1	3–0	2–0	1–2	2–2	0–1	1–1	2–1	2–0
MKS Kluczbork	2–2	1–1	3–2	0–2	1–1	2–1	2–2		3–2	1–1	2–2	1–2	0–1	1–2	0–0	2–2	0–4	2–2
Olimpia Grudziądz	2–3	0–1	2–1	0–2	1–0	1–2	2–1	2–0		0–2	1–0	2–0	3–1	0–0	0–0	0–1	3–1	1–0
Podbeskidzie Bielsko-Biała	2–1	0–1	2–1	0–2	2–2	3–3	2–1	3–1	0–3		0–0	2–1	0–1	2–2	1–1	0–0	4–5	2–0
Pogoń Siedlce	1–0	1–2	2–0	0–1	1–0	2–1	0–4	1–1	1–4	3–0		0–3	1–0	1–0	1–2	2–1	0–2	1–0
Sandecja Nowy Sącz	3–1	1–1	1–0	0–1	1–1	2–0	1–0	4–1	3–1	0–0	4–0		1–0	2–1	2–1	0–0	5–0	5–2
Stal Mielec	2–2	0–1	1–4	3–3	3–2	1–2	1–0	1–1	1–0	0–1	1–2	0–0		0–0	2–1	0–1	2–0	3–1
Stomil Olsztyn	3–1	1–1	3–0	1–1	4–0	2–4	0–1	1–0	1–3	1–0	1–1	0–0	0–4		1–4	3–2	0–0	5–1
Wigry Suwałki	3–2	2–3	2–2	3–2	1–0	0–0	0–1	2–0	0–2	2–0	1–4	0–1	6–0	2–1		3–2	0–3	2–1
Wisła Puławy	2–1	0–0	3–4	0–3	2–1	0–1	1–5	0–0	0–1	0–1	1–1	0–0	0–0	1–1	0–1		1–1	1–2
Zagłębie Sosnowiec	3–3	1–1	0–2	1–0	2–1	2–1	1–0	4–0	3–5	0–0	1–0	2–0	1–1	1–1	2–0	3–1		0–3
Znicz Pruszków	1–2	3–3	0–0	1–4	2–0	1–2	0–0	1–0	0–1	0–1	2–1	1–3	1–0	0–3	4–5	0–3	1–4	

Source: 90minut.pl
Legend: Blue = home team win; Yellow = draw; Red = away team win.

== I liga play-off ==
The 15th place team from the regular season will compete in a play-off with the 4th place team from II liga. Matches will be played on 11 and 18 June 2017. The winner will compete in the 2017–18 I liga season.

11 June 2017
17:00

Bytovia Bytów	4–0	Radomiak Radom
González 11'; Klichowicz 33'; Surdykowski 44', 68'	Report

MOSiR Stadium, Bytów
Attendance: 1,150
Referee: Piotr Lasyk (Bytom)

18 June 2017
16:00

Radomiak Radom	0–2	Bytovia Bytów
	Report	Rzuchowski 51', 75'

Stadion Miejski, Radom
Attendance: 2,655
Referee: Paweł Pskit (Łódź)

Bytovia won 6–0 on aggregate and stayed in I liga for next season.

== Top goalscorers ==
Rank	Player	Club	Goals
1	(Spain) Igor Angulo	Górnik Zabrze	17
2	(Poland) Jakub Świerczok	GKS Tychy	16
3	(Poland) Karol Angielski	Olimpia Grudziądz	14
3	(Poland) Damian Kądzior	Wigry Suwałki	14
5	(Finland) Petteri Forsell	Miedź Legnica	13
6	(Poland) Kamil Zapolnik	Wigry Suwałki	12
7	(Poland) Sylwester Patejuk	Wisła Puławy	11
7	(Slovakia) Martin Pribula	Zagłębie Sosnowiec	11
9	(Poland) Adrian Paluchowski	Znicz Pruszków	10
9	(Poland) Paweł Zawistowski	Chojniczanka Chojnice	10

== Awards ==
=== Annual awards ===
Award	Winner	Club	Ref.
Goalkeeper of the Season	(Poland) Tomasz Loska	Górnik Zabrze	
Left-back of the Season	(Poland) Jarosław Ratajczak	Stomil Olsztyn	
Centre-back of the Season	(Poland) Lukas Klemenz	Olimpia Grudziądz	
Right-back of the Season	(Poland) Jacek Podgórski	Chojniczanka Chojnice	
Left Midfielder of the Season	(Poland) Sylwester Patejuk	Wisła Puławy	
Central Midfielder of the Season	(Poland) Szymon Matuszek	Górnik Zabrze	
Right Midfielder of the Season	(Poland) Łukasz Wolsztyński	Górnik Zabrze	
Forward of the Season	(Poland) Andrzej Rybski	Chojniczanka Chojnice	
Player of the Season	(Poland) Lukas Klemenz	Olimpia Grudziądz	

==== Team of the season ====
Pos.	Player	Club	Ref.
GK	(Poland) Tomasz Loska	Górnik Zabrze	
DF	(Poland) Jarosław Ratajczak	Stomil Olsztyn	
DF	(Poland) Mateusz Wieteska	Chrobry Głogów	
DF	(Poland) Lukas Klemenz	Olimpia Grudziądz	
DF	(Poland) Jacek Podgórski	Chojniczanka Chojnice	
MF	(Poland) Sylwester Patejuk	Wisła Puławy	
MF	(Poland) Wojciech Trochim	Sandecja Nowy Sącz	
MF	(Poland) Szymon Matuszek	Górnik Zabrze	
MF	(Poland) Łukasz Wolsztyński	Górnik Zabrze	
FW	(Spain) Igor Angulo	Górnik Zabrze	
FW	(Poland) Andrzej Rybski	Chojniczanka Chojnice	

== See also ==
- 2016–17 Ekstraklasa
