= Paweł Charbicki =

Polish footballer

Personal information
- Date of birth: 6 November 1965 (age 60)
- Height: 1.81 m (5 ft 11 in)
- Position: Goalkeeper

Senior career*
Years	Team	Apps	(Gls)
- ChKS Łódź
- Granica Kętrzyn
- Sokół Ostróda
1987–1990	Stomil Olsztyn		
1993–1997	Stomil Olsztyn		
1998	Warmia Olsztyn	5	(0)
1998–1999	Świt Nowy Dwór		
- * Club domestic league appearances and goals

Paweł Charbicki (born 6 November 1965) is a Polish former professional footballer who played as a goalkeeper.
