= Emil Drozdowicz =

Polish footballer (born 1986)

Personal information
- Full name: Emil Drozdowicz
- Date of birth: 5 July 1986 (age 40)
- Place of birth: Sulęcin, Poland
- Height: 1.78 m (5 ft 10 in)
- Position: Forward

Team information
- Current team: Stilon Gorzów Wielkopolski
- Number: 21

Youth career
- Spójnia Ośno Lubuskie
- 2001–2005: LSPM Zielona Góra

Senior career*
| Years | Team | Apps | (Gls) |
| 2005–2009 | Lechia Zielona Góra | | |
| 2008–2009 | → GKP Gorzów Wielkopolski (loan) | 32 | (12) |
| 2009 | → Arka Gdynia (loan) | 0 | (0) |
| 2010–2011 | GKP Gorzów Wielkopolski | 39 | (14) |
| 2011 | Polonia Bytom | 3 | (1) |
| 2011–2016 | Termalica Bruk-Bet | 136 | (37) |
| 2016–2017 | Wisła Płock | 11 | (0) |
| 2017–2020 | Chojniczanka Chojnice | 65 | (10) |
| 2020–2022 | Wisła Puławy | 70 | (20) |
| 2022– | Stilon Gorzów Wielkopolski | 134 | (61) |
- * Club domestic league appearances and goals as of 13:01, 26 June 2026 (UTC)

Emil Drozdowicz (born 5 July 1986) is a Polish professional footballer who plays as a forward for III liga club Stilon Gorzów Wielkopolski.

== Career ==
In July 2009, Drozdowicz was loaned to Arka Gdynia on a one-year deal from Lechia Zielona Góra. In the winter 2010, he joined GKP Gorzów Wlkp. on a three-year deal.

In May 2011, he joined Polonia Bytom.

In June 2011, he joined LKS Nieciecza on a two-year contract.

In February 2016, he joined Wisła Płock from Termalica Bruk-Bet for free.

In July 2017, he joined Chojniczanka Chojnice from Wisła Płock for free.

On 7 July 2020, he signed with Wisła Puławy.

On 19 July 2022, he returned to Gorzów Wielkopolski to rejoin Stilon.

== Honours ==
Lechia Zielona Góra

- Polish Cup (Lubusz regionals): 2006–07

Wisła Puławy

- III liga, group IV: 2020–21
- Polish Cup (Lublin subdistrict regionals): 2020–21
