= Machaj =

Machaj is a surname. Notable people with the surname include:

- Bartosz Machaj (born 1993), Polish footballer
- Mateusz Machaj (born 1989), Polish footballer
- Stefan Machaj (born 1964), Polish footballer
