= Robert Hirsz =

Polish footballer (born 1989)

Personal information
- Full name: Robert Marek Hirsz
- Date of birth: 17 October 1989 (age 37)
- Place of birth: Gdańsk, Poland
- Height: 1.85 m (6 ft 1 in)
- Position: Forward

Team information
- Current team: Stoczniowiec Gdańsk
- Number: 15

Senior career*
Years	Team	Apps	(Gls)
2006–2009	Lechia Gdańsk	24	(0)
2010	→ Tur Turek (loan)	13	(2)
2011	APEP Pitsilia		
2011	Bałtyk Gdynia	8	(0)
2012	Kaszubia Kościerzyna	13	(3)
2012–2015	Bytovia Bytów	72	(25)
2015	Wigry Suwałki	12	(1)
2016	Legionovia Legionowo	4	(0)
2016–2017	Sokół Ostróda	32	(16)
2017–2018	Wisła Puławy	30	(5)
2018	Olimpia Grudziądz	16	(5)
2019	Sokół Ostróda	20	(9)
2020	KP Starogard Gdański	17	(4)
2021	Warta Gorzów Wielkopolski	14	(0)
2021–2022	GKS Przodkowo	27	(4)
2022–2023	Włocłavia Włocławek	17	(5)
2023–2024	Powiśle Dzierzgoń	33	(9)
2024	Bałtyk Gdynia	17	(6)
2024–2025	Powiśle Dzierzgoń	14	(9)
2025	Wierzyca Pelplin	12	(1)
2025–2026	Amator Kiełpino	12	(1)
2026–	Stoczniowiec Gdańsk	11	(0)

International career
2008	Poland U19	1	(0)
- * Club domestic league appearances and goals as of 22:26, 22 June 2026 (UTC)

Robert Marek Hirsz (born 17 October 1989) is a Polish professional footballer who plays as a forward for IV liga Pomerania club Stoczniowiec Gdańsk.

== Career ==
Born in Gdańsk, Hirsz began his career at Lechia Gdańsk making his debut on 15 April 2006. On 3 February 2019, Hirsz returned to Sokół Ostróda.

== Honours ==
Lechia Gdańsk

- II liga: 2007–08

Stoczniowiec Gdańsk

- Regional league Gdańsk I: 2025–26
