= Krzysztof Job =

Polish football manager

Personal information
- Date of birth: 28 January 1963 (age 63)
- Place of birth: Maków Podhalański, Poland
- Height: 1.70 m (5 ft 7 in)
- Position: Defender

Senior career*
Years	Team	Apps	(Gls)
1981–1982	Halniak Maków Podhalański		
1983–1984	Górnik Zabrze		
1986–1993	Odra Opole		
1993–1998	Varta Start Namysłów		
1998–1999	Odra Opole		

Managerial career
- 2001–2002: Odra Opole
- 2006–2008: Ruch Zdzieszowice
- 2009: Orzeł Źlinice
- 2009–2010: Victoria Chrościce
- 2011–2014: Orzeł Źlinice
- 2015–: Silesius Kotórz Mały
- * Club domestic league appearances and goals

Krzysztof Job (born 28 January 1963) is a Polish football manager and former player who played as a defender.

Job managed Victoria Chrościce between 2003 and 2005, and later managed Ruch Zdzieszowice, with whom he was twice promoted to the IV liga and then the III liga. He then managed Orzeł Źlinice before being re-appointed as Victoria Chrościce manager in November 2009, with the club on 9 points after 14 matches. He was sacked as manager of Victoria Chrościce in December 2010, after avoiding relegation in the 2009–10 season.
