= Piotr Darmochwał =

Polish footballer (born 1991)

Personal information
- Date of birth: 19 June 1991 (age 35)
- Place of birth: Tomaszów Lubelski, Poland
- Height: 1.75 m (5 ft 9 in)
- Position: Midfielder

Team information
- Current team: Cisowianka Drzewce
- Number: 18

Youth career
- Tomasovia Tomaszów Lubelski
- 2007–2008: Promień Opalenica

Senior career*
Years	Team	Apps	(Gls)
2009–2013	Promień Opalenica	8	(2)
2009–2013	→ Okocimski KS Brzesko (loan)	129	(20)
2014	Stomil Olsztyn	35	(9)
2015–2016	Wisła Płock	18	(3)
2016	→ Olimpia Grudziądz (loan)	10	(0)
2016–2018	Wisła Puławy	36	(2)
2018–2021	Motor Lublin	27	(2)
2019	→ Avia Świdnik (loan)	14	(3)
2021	Avia Świdnik	16	(5)
2021–2022	Igros Krasnobród	5	(0)
2022–2023	Orion Niedrzwica Duża	30	(20)
2024–	Cisowianka Drzewce	40	(38)
- * Club domestic league appearances and goals as of 17:12, 30 June 2026 (UTC)

Piotr Darmochwał (born 19 June 1991) is a Polish professional footballer who plays as a midfielder for regional league club Cisowianka Drzewce.

== Club career ==
Darmochwał started his career in his hometown club Tomasovia Tomaszów Lubelski. In 2007, he moved to Promień Opalenica. Progressing through their youth level, he made his first-team debut at the age of 17 in a match against Mieszko Gniezno on 28 March 2009. Ahead of 2009–10 season, he joined II liga club Okocimski KS Brzesko on loan. In the 2011-12 season, he made 28 appearances, scoring 8 goals, helping the team to gain promotion to I liga. He spent on loan four-and-a-half seasons with Okocimski, before returning to Promień Opalenica.

In January 2014, Darmochwał signed a one-year contract with I liga side Stomil Olsztyn. He made his debut for Stomil on 7 March 2014, in an away league match against ROW Rybnik, scoring in a 2–0 win. During his one-year spell at Stomil, he scored 9 goals in 35 league appearances.

In December 2014, Darmochwał signed a two-year contract with Wisła Płock. A year later, he joined Olimpia Grudziądz on loan until the end of 2015–16 season. In July 2016, he moved to Wisła Puławy, where he played for two years, scoring 3 goals in 38 matches.

On 6 July 2018, Darmochwał signed a contract with Motor Lublin. On 5 March 2019, he was loaned to Avia Świdnik until the end of the 2018–19 season.

== Honours ==
Okocimski KS Brzesko

- II liga East: 2011–12

Motor Lublin

- III liga, group IV: 2019–20
- Polish Cup (Lublin subdistrict regionals): 2019–20
