= Jakub Smektała =

Polish footballer (born 1987)

Personal information
- Full name: Jakub Smektała
- Date of birth: 26 August 1987 (age 39)
- Place of birth: Rawicz, Poland
- Height: 1.84 m (6 ft 1/2 in)
- Position: Midfielder

Team information
- Current team: Orla Jutrosin
- Number: 8

Senior career*
Years	Team	Apps	(Gls)
2004–2007	Sparta Miejska Górka		
2007–2008	Piast Kobylin		
2008	Jarota Jarocin	18	(11)
2008–2011	Piast Gliwice	70	(6)
2011–2014	Ruch Chorzów	54	(2)
2013–2014	Ruch Chorzów II	11	(1)
2014–2016	Zawisza Bydgoszcz	39	(6)
2016–2018	Wisła Puławy	51	(6)
2018–2019	Sokół Kleczew	11	(3)
2019–2022	Piast Kobylin	72	(49)
2022–2025	Barycz Sułów	90	(33)
2025–	Orla Jutrosin	28	(18)
- * Club domestic league appearances and goals as of 09:06, 26 June 2026 (UTC)

Jakub Smektała (born 26 August 1987) is a Polish professional footballer who plays as a midfielder for V liga Greater Poland club Orla Jutrosin.

== Career ==
In January 2011, he joined Ruch Chorzów on a three-year contract which will apply from 1 July 2011.

== Honours ==
Barycz Sułów

- Polish Cup (Lower Silesia regionals): 2023–24
- Polish Cup (Wrocław regionals): 2023–24, 2024–25

Orla Jutrosin

- Regional league Greater Poland IV: 2025–26
- Polish Cup (Leszno regionals): 2025–26
