= Piotr Kieruzel =

Polish footballer

Personal information
- Full name: Piotr Kieruzel
- Date of birth: 12 November 1988 (age 37)
- Place of birth: Kołobrzeg, Poland
- Height: 1.87 m (6 ft 1 1/2 in)
- Position: Centre-back

Youth career
- Żaki 94 Kołobrzeg
- 2006: MSP Szamotuły

Senior career*
Years	Team	Apps	(Gls)
2006–2007	Sparta Oborniki		
2007–2008	Zagłębie Lubin (ME)	23	(1)
2008–2010	Ruch Chorzów	4	(0)
2011	Warta Poznań	12	(1)
2011–2014	Flota Świnoujście	74	(10)
2014–2018	Chojniczanka Chojnice	96	(5)
2018–2019	Kotwica Kołobrzeg	21	(2)

Managerial career
- 2021: Elana Toruń
- 2021–2022: Chojniczanka Chojnice II
- 2022: Chojniczanka Chojnice (caretaker)
- 2022–2023: Chojniczanka Chojnice (assistant)
- 2023–2025: Kotwica Kołobrzeg (assistant)
- * Club domestic league appearances and goals

Piotr Kieruzel (born 12 November 1988 in Kołobrzeg) is a Polish professional football manager and former player. He was most recently the assistant coach of Kotwica Kołobrzeg.

== Career ==
In January 2011, he joined Warta Poznań.

In July 2011, he signed a contract with Flota Świnoujście.
