= Janusz Surdykowski =

Polish footballer

Personal information
- Full name: Janusz Surdykowski
- Date of birth: 4 May 1986 (age 40)
- Place of birth: Gdańsk, Poland
- Height: 1.87 m (6 ft 1 1/2 in)
- Position: Striker

Team information
- Current team: Jaguar Gdańsk
- Number: 28

Youth career
- MOSiR Pruszcz Gdański

Senior career*
Years	Team	Apps	(Gls)
2002–2004	Debiutant Gdańsk		
2004	Polonia Warsaw	1	(0)
2005–2006	Amica Wronki	5	(0)
2006–2010	Górnik Łęczna	63	(13)
2007	→ Podbeskidzie (loan)	8	(0)
2010–2011	APEP	22	(15)
2011–2013	Arka Gdynia	31	(9)
2013–2018	Bytovia Bytów	138	(59)
2018–2020	Chojniczanka Chojnice	42	(9)
2020–2021	Olimpia Elbląg	32	(16)
2021–2023	Radunia Stężyca	43	(13)
2023	KP Starogard Gdański	14	(6)
2023–	Jaguar Gdańsk	53	(28)

International career
2007	Poland U21	1	(1)
- * Club domestic league appearances and goals as of 13:18, 20 June 2025 (UTC)

Janusz Surdykowski (born 4 May 1986) is a Polish professional footballer who plays as a striker for IV liga Pomerania club Jaguar Gdańsk.

== Career ==
In June 2006, Surdykowski joined Górnik Łęczna on a four-year contract. In July 2007, he was loaned to Podbeskidzie Bielsko-Biała. He returned to Górnik half year later.

In August 2010, he signed a contract with APEP.

In July 2011, Surdykowski moved to Arka Gdynia.

On 28 August 2020, he signed with Olimpia Elbląg.

== Honours ==
Górnik Łęczna

- III liga, group IV: 2007–08

Individual

- Polish Cup top scorer: 2017–18
