= Grzegorz Szymusik =

Polish footballer

Personal information
- Date of birth: 4 June 1998 (age 28)
- Place of birth: Stargard, Poland
- Height: 1.84 m (6 ft 0 in)
- Position: Right-back

Team information
- Current team: Polonia Bytom
- Number: 14

Youth career
- Zenit Koszewo
- –2015: Błękitni Stargard

Senior career*
Years	Team	Apps	(Gls)
2015–2018	Błękitni Stargard	65	(8)
2018–2019	Warta Poznań	26	(3)
2019–2022	Korona Kielce	72	(4)
2023–2024	Chojniczanka Chojnice	30	(7)
2024–	Polonia Bytom	56	(6)

International career
2016	Poland U19	2	(1)
- * Club domestic league appearances and goals as of 08:44, 27 May 2026 (UTC)

Grzegorz Szymusik (born 4 June 1998) is a Polish professional footballer who plays as a right-back for I liga club Polonia Bytom.

== Honours ==
Polonia Bytom

- II liga: 2024–25
