= Adrian Rakowski =

Polish footballer (born 1990)

Personal information
- Date of birth: 7 October 1990 (age 36)
- Place of birth: Żagań, Poland
- Height: 1.80 m (5 ft 11 in)
- Position: Midfielder

Team information
- Current team: Orzeł Łękawica

Youth career
- Piast Iłowa
- Vitrosilicon Iłowa
- 2007–2008: Zagłębie Lubin

Senior career*
Years	Team	Apps	(Gls)
2008–2017	Zagłębie Lubin II	43	(8)
2010–2017	Zagłębie Lubin	91	(3)
2014	→ Olimpia Grudziądz (loan)	2	(0)
2017–2020	Podbeskidzie	72	(3)
2020–2022	Chojniczanka Chojnice	27	(0)
2022–2023	Podhale Nowy Targ	21	(1)
2023–2024	Wiślanie Jaśkowice	46	(3)
2024–2025	Kuźnia Ustroń	33	(3)
2025–	Orzeł Łękawica	0	(0)
- * Club domestic league appearances and goals as of 10:17, 21 June 2025 (UTC)

Adrian Rakowski (born 7 October 1990) is a Polish professional footballer who plays as a midfielder for IV liga Silesia club Orzeł Łękawica.

== Career ==
He made his debut for Zagłębie in a 3–1 victory to Lechia Gdańsk on 27 November 2010.

On 6 October 2020, he signed with third-tier II liga club Chojniczanka Chojnice.

== Honours ==
Zagłębie Lubin

- I liga: 2014–15

Zagłębie Lubin II

- IV liga Lower Silesia West: 2016–17

Podhale Nowy Targ

- Polish Cup (Nowy Targ regionals): 2021–22

Wiślanie Jaśkowice

- IV liga Lesser Poland: 2022–23
- Polish Cup (Kraków regionals): 2023–24
