= Tomasz Mikołajczak =

Polish footballer

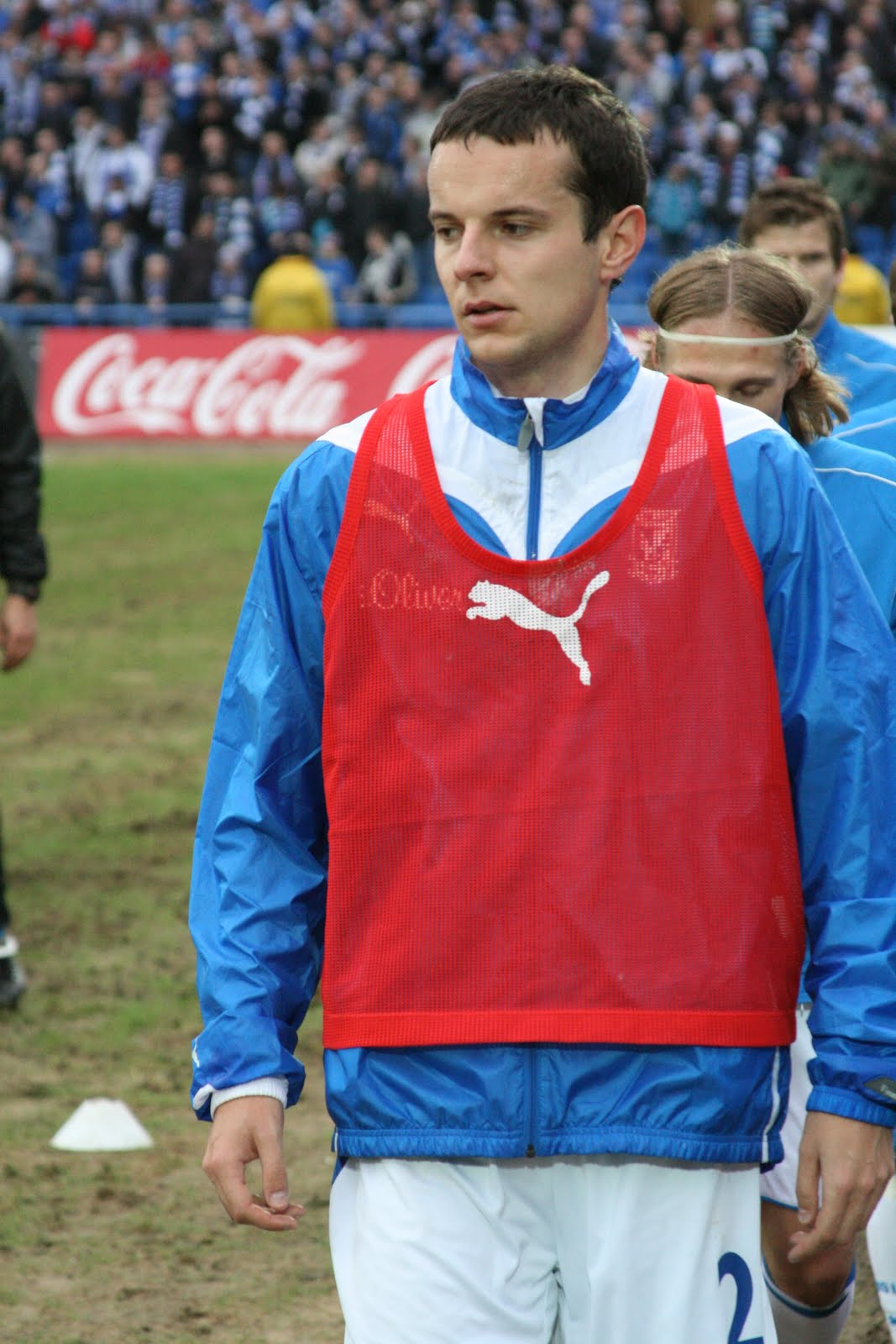
- Mikołajczak with Lech Poznań in 2010

Personal information
- Date of birth: 11 December 1987 (age 38)
- Place of birth: Kościan, Poland
- Height: 1.88 m (6 ft 2 in)
- Position: Forward

Youth career
- Obra Kościan

Senior career*
Years	Team	Apps	(Gls)
2004–2006	Obra Kościan		
2006–2009	Nielba Wągrowiec	57	(34)
2009–2013	Lech Poznań	32	(5)
2010	→ Polonia Bytom (loan)	4	(0)
2012	→ Nielba Wągrowiec (loan)	5	(4)
2012–2013	→ Chojniczanka Chojnice (loan)	30	(7)
2013–2025	Chojniczanka Chojnice	303	(83)
2016–2025	Chojniczanka Chojnice II	30	(16)
- * Club domestic league appearances and goals

Tomasz Mikołajczak (born 11 December 1987) is a Polish former professional footballer who played as a striker.

== Career ==
Mikołajczak is a trainee of Obra Kościan. He joined Lech Poznań in the summer of 2009 from Nielba Wągrowiec.

== Honours ==
Nielba Wągrowiec

- IV liga Greater Poland North: 2006–07
- Polish Cup (Piła regionals): 2006–07, 2007–08

Lech Poznań

- Ekstraklasa: 2009–10

Individual

- IV liga Greater Poland North top scorer: 2006–07
- II liga West top scorer: 2008–09
