= Kamil Cupriak =

Polish footballer

Personal information
- Date of birth: 11 November 1994 (age 32)
- Place of birth: Łódź, Poland
- Height: 1.83 m (6 ft 0 in)
- Position: Centre forward

Team information
- Current team: Zjednoczeni Stryków
- Number: 10

Youth career
- UKS SMS Łódź
- ŁKS Łódź

Senior career*
Years	Team	Apps	(Gls)
2013–2016	Górnik Zabrze II	25	(3)
2013–2016	Górnik Zabrze	3	(0)
2014–2015	→ ŁKS Łódź (loan)	26	(4)
2016	→ Radomiak Radom (loan)	13	(3)
2016–2018	Radomiak Radom	36	(5)
2018–2019	Siarka Tarnobrzeg	14	(2)
2019–2020	Sokół Aleksandrów Łódzki	10	(1)
2020–	Zjednoczeni Stryków	130	(52)

International career
2013	Poland U19	1	(0)
- * Club domestic league appearances and goals as of 08:08, 25 June 2025 (UTC)

Kamil Cupriak (born 11 November 1994) is a Polish footballer who plays as a centre forward for IV liga Łódź club Zjednoczeni Stryków.

== Honours ==
Górnik Zabrze II

- Polish Cup (Zabrze regionals): 2015–16
