= Szymon Matuszek =

Polish footballer

Personal information
- Full name: Szymon Matuszek
- Date of birth: 7 January 1989 (age 37)
- Place of birth: Cieszyn, Poland
- Height: 1.85 m (6 ft 1 in)
- Position: Midfielder

Team information
- Current team: Górnik Zabrze (assistant)

Youth career
- –2005: WSP Wodzisław Śląski
- 2005–2006: Silesia Lubomia

Senior career*
Years	Team	Apps	(Gls)
2006–2007	UD Horadada		
2007–2008	Real Madrid C		
2008–2009	Jagiellonia Białystok	15	(1)
2009–2012	Piast Gliwice	10	(0)
2011	→ Chojniczanka Chojnice (loan)	10	(1)
2012	→ Wisła Płock (loan)	3	(0)
2012–2016	Dolcan Ząbki	105	(10)
2016–2020	Górnik Zabrze	124	(8)
2020–2023	Miedź Legnica	71	(7)
2022	Miedź Legnica II	1	(0)
2023–2024	GKS Jastrzębie	17	(2)

International career
2009–2010	Poland U21	3	(0)
- * Club domestic league appearances and goals

Szymon Matuszek (born 7 January 1989) is a Polish former professional footballer who played as a midfielder. He is currently an assistant coach of Ekstraklasa club Górnik Zabrze.

== Career ==
In February 2011, he was loaned to Chojniczanka Chojnice on a half-year deal. He returned to Piast Gliwice at the conclusion of the loan spell.

On 4 August 2020, he moved to Miedź Legnica.

On 9 September 2023, Matuszek joined II liga side GKS Jastrzębie on a deal until June 2025. He left the club by mutual consent on 1 July 2024.

== Honours ==
Miedź Legnica

- I liga: 2021–22

Individual

- I liga Central Midfielder of the Season: 2016–17
- I liga Team of the Season: 2016–17
