= Leândro Rossi =

Brazilian footballer

Personal information
- Full name: Leândro Rossi Pereira
- Date of birth: 26 November 1988 (age 37)
- Place of birth: Andradina, Brazil
- Height: 1.75 m (5 ft 9 in)
- Position: Forward

Youth career
- Araçatuba

Senior career*
Years	Team	Apps	(Gls)
- Rio Verde
- Mixto
2011	Zawisza Rzgów	15+	(3+)
2012–2026	Radomiak Radom	364	(116)
- * Club domestic league appearances and goals

Leândro Rossi Pereira (born 26 November 1988) is a Brazilian former professional footballer who played as a forward.

== Career ==
In 2007, Leândro traveled with a Brazilian youth team through a Polish businessman to Poland and Turkey, where they played against Fenerbahçe, one of the most successful clubs in Turkey. After that, however, he stopped playing professional football for two years due to not receiving clearance from the Polish Football Association.

Before the second half of the 2010–11 season, he signed for Polish fifth division side Zawisza Rzgów after playing for Mixto in the Brazilian lower leagues.

In early 2012, he signed for Polish fourth division club Radomiak Radom, helping them achieve promotion to the second division within seven seasons. In 2021, with Leandro as club captain, Radomiak won promotion back to the Ekstraklasa after 36 years of absence. He made 85 appearances, scored six goals and provided seven assists for Radomiak in the Polish top-tier. He retired from professional football on 16 May 2026, starting in a 3–1 loss to Lech Poznań and leaving the pitch in the 9th minute to a guard of honour from both teams. His jersey number 9 was retired by Radomiak after the game.

== Personal life ==
On 28 June 2021, Leândro received Polish citizenship.

== Honours ==
Radomiak Radom

- I liga: 2020–21
- II liga: 2018–19
- III liga Łódź–Masovian: 2011–12, 2014–15

Individual

- II liga top scorer: 2017–18, 2018–19
