= Sławomir Szeliga =

Polish footballer

Personal information
- Date of birth: 17 July 1982 (age 44)
- Place of birth: Rzeszów, Poland
- Height: 1.81 m (5 ft 11 in)
- Position: Midfielder

Team information
- Current team: Sokół Kolbuszowa Dolna (manager)

Senior career*
Years	Team	Apps	(Gls)
2001–2005	Stal Rzeszów		
2005–2008	Widzew Łódź	83	(3)
2008–2015	Cracovia	167	(4)
2015–2022	Stal Rzeszów	184	(11)

Managerial career
- 2022–2024: Stal Rzeszów II
- 2024–2025: Stal Rzeszów (assistant)
- 2025–: Sokół Kolbuszowa Dolna
- * Club domestic league appearances and goals

Sławomir Szeliga (born 17 July 1982) is a Polish professional football manager and former player who played as a midfielder. He is currently in charge of III liga club Sokół Kolbuszowa Dolna.

== Managerial statistics ==
As of match played 30 May 2026

Managerial record by team and tenure
Team	From	To	Record							
Team	From	To	G	W	D	L	GF	GA	GD	Win %
Stal Rzeszów II	20 June 2022	8 January 2024	57	27	6	24	129	80	+49	47.37
Sokół Kolbuszowa Dolna	5 November 2025	Present	19	9	3	7	24	24	+0	47.37
Total			76	36	9	31	153	104	+49	47.37

== Honours ==
Stal Rzeszów

- II liga: 2021–22
- III liga, group IV: 2018–19
