= Andrzej Rybski =

Polish footballer

Personal information
- Full name: Andrzej Rybski
- Date of birth: 11 March 1985 (age 41)
- Place of birth: Wolfsburg, West Germany
- Height: 1.81 m (5 ft 11 1/2 in)
- Position: Forward

Youth career
- ŁKS Łódź
- 1999–2003: Widzew Łódź

Senior career*
Years	Team	Apps	(Gls)
2003–2007	Widzew Łódź	36	(6)
2005–2006	→ Polonia Bytom (loan)	29	(6)
2006	→ ŁKS Łomża (loan)	13	(5)
2007	→ Górnik Polkowice (loan)	16	(3)
2007–2010	Lechia Gdańsk	53	(9)
2010	Zawisza Bydgoszcz	13	(4)
2010	Odra Wodzisław	17	(7)
2011–2013	Termalica Bruk-Bet Nieciecza	95	(13)
2014–2018	Chojniczanka Chojnice	94	(19)
2018–2019	Pogoń Siedlce	38	(7)
2019	Widzew Łódź II	7	(1)
Total		411	(80)
- * Club domestic league appearances and goals

Andrzej Rybski (born 11 March 1985) is a Polish former professional footballer who played as a forward. He was most recently the assistant coach of Widzew Łódź's under-17 team.

== Career ==
In February 2011, he joined Termalica Bruk-Bet Nieciecza.

=== Widzew Łódź II ===
Joining Pogoń Siedlce in February 2018, he left the club in September 2019 to join the reserve team of his former club, Widzew Łódź.

== Honours ==
Lechia Gdańsk

- II liga: 2007–08

Individual

- I liga Forward of the Season: 2016–17
- I liga Team of the Season: 2016–17
