= Mariusz Zawodziński =

Polish footballer

Personal information
- Full name: Mariusz Zawodziński
- Date of birth: 11 February 1989 (age 37)
- Place of birth: Bełchatów, Poland
- Height: 1.71 m (5 ft 7 1/2 in)
- Position: Midfielder

Youth career
- 2003–2006: GKS Bełchatów

Senior career*
Years	Team	Apps	(Gls)
2007–2011	GKS Bełchatów (ME)	96	(8)
2007–2011	GKS Bełchatów	3	(0)
2011	KSZO Ostrowiec	0	(0)
2011–2014	Znicz Pruszków	58	(2)
2014–2015	Omega Kleszczów	48	(8)
2015	Legionovia Legionowo	19	(2)
2015–2017	Widzew Łódź		
2017–2019	Warta Sieradz		
2019–2020	Orkan Buczek	13	(2)
2020	Skalnik Sulejów	10	(0)
2021	Włókniarz Zelów	17	(2)
2021	Czarni Rząśnia	1	(0)
2022–2023	ESPN Bełchatów	10	(2)
- * Club domestic league appearances and goals

Mariusz Zawodziński (born 11 February 1989) is a Polish former professional footballer who played as a midfielder.

== Career ==
=== Club ===
He made his debut in Ekstraklasa in a 1–1 draw game against Cracovia on 10 May 2008.

In July 2011, he was released from GKS Bełchatów.

In July 2011, he joined Znicz Pruszków.

In January 2016, he joined Widzew Łódź.

In February 2017, he moved to Warta Sieradz.

== Honours ==
Widzew Łódź

- IV liga Łódź: 2015–16

Warta Sieradz

- IV liga Łódź: 2016–17
- Polish Cup (Łódź regionals): 2016–17
