= Wojciech Trochim =

Polish footballer (born 1989)

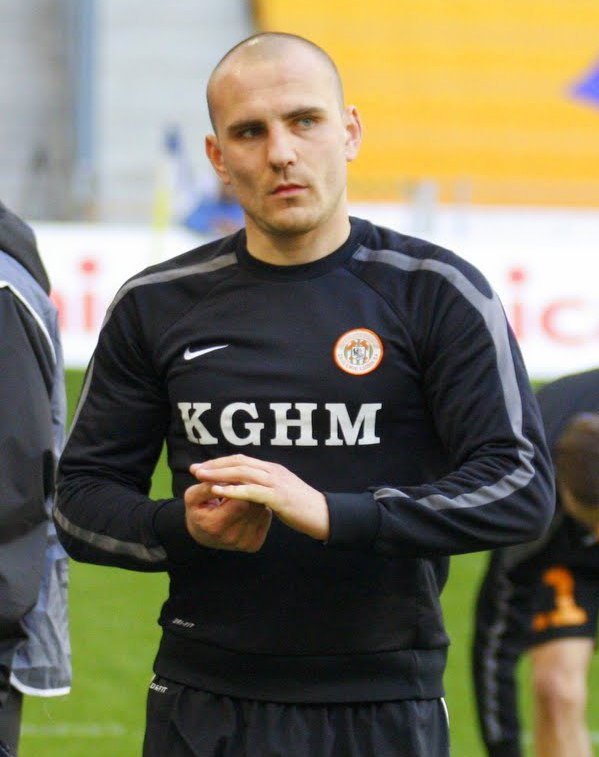
- Trochim with Zagłębie Lubin in 2013

Personal information
- Full name: Wojciech Trochim
- Date of birth: 31 March 1989 (age 37)
- Place of birth: Mińsk Mazowiecki, Poland
- Height: 1.80 m (5 ft 11 in)
- Position: Midfielder

Team information
- Current team: Mazur Karczew; Stal Kraśnik (sporting director)
- Number: 9

Youth career
- 2003–2004: Mazovia Mińsk Mazowiecki
- 2004–2005: AON Rembertów

Senior career*
Years	Team	Apps	(Gls)
2006	AON Rembertów		
2006–2007	Legia Warsaw II		
2007–2010	Legia Warsaw	1	(0)
2008–2009	→ Dolcan Ząbki (loan)	27	(1)
2010	→ Bałtyk Gdynia (loan)	31	(6)
2011–2012	Sandecja Nowy Sącz	29	(1)
2012	Warta Poznań	15	(5)
2013	Zagłębie Lubin	1	(0)
2013–2014	Kolejarz Stróże	33	(8)
2014–2015	Podbeskidzie Bielsko-Biała	3	(0)
2014–2015	Podbeskidzie Bielsko-Biała II	11	(6)
2014	→ GKS Tychy (loan)	10	(1)
2015	GKS Katowice	19	(0)
2016–2018	Sandecja Nowy Sącz	83	(12)
2018–2019	Chojniczanka Chojnice	26	(3)
2020	KSZO Ostrowiec	20	(12)
2021	KS Wiązownica	15	(3)
2021–2022	Pogoń Siedlce	26	(4)
2022–2024	Mazovia Mińsk Mazowiecki	60	(32)
2024–2025	Mazur Karczew	27	(24)
2025–2026	Tygrys Huta Mińska	14	(17)
2026–	Mazur Karczew	16	(10)

International career
	Poland U18	1	(0)
	Poland U19	1	(1)
- * Club domestic league appearances and goals as of 16:31, 30 June 2026 (UTC)

Wojciech Trochim (born 31 March 1989) is a Polish professional footballer who plays as a midfielder for IV liga Masovia club Mazur Karczew. He also serves as the sporting director of IV liga Lublin club Stal Kraśnik.

== Career ==
Trochim was born in Mińsk Mazowiecki. In February 2011, he joined Sandecja Nowy Sącz.

He was also a member of Poland national under-19 team.

== Honours ==
Sandecja Nowy Sącz

- I liga: 2016–17

Individual

- I liga Team of the Season: 2016–17

KSZO Ostrowiec Świętokrzyski

- Polish Cup (Świętokrzyskie regionals): 2019–20

Mazovia Mińsk Mazowiecki

- Polish Cup (Siedlce regionals): 2023–24

Mazur Karczew

- V liga Masovia II: 2024–25
