= Krystian Stępniowski =

Polish footballer

Personal information
- Full name: Krystian Stępniowski
- Date of birth: 5 December 1992 (age 33)
- Place of birth: Kraków, Poland
- Height: 1.91 m (6 ft 3 in)
- Position: Goalkeeper

Youth career
- Hutnik Kraków

Senior career*
Years	Team	Apps	(Gls)
2008–2009	Hutnik Kraków II		
2010–2012	Hutnik Kraków		
2011–2012	→ Górnik Zabrze (loan)	0	(0)
2012–2014	Puszcza Niepołomice	42	(0)
2012–2019	Cracovia	2	(0)
2017	→ Pogoń Siedlce (loan)	7	(0)
2019–2021	Zagłębie Sosnowiec	34	(0)
2021–2022	Stal Rzeszów	2	(0)

International career
2013	Poland U20	1	(0)
- * Club domestic league appearances and goals

Krystian Stępniowski (born 5 December 1992) is a Polish former professional footballer who played as a goalkeeper.

== Honours ==
Stal Rzeszów

- II liga: 2021–22
