= Paweł Zawistowski =

Polish footballer

Personal information
- Full name: Paweł Zawistowski
- Date of birth: 11 March 1984 (age 42)
- Place of birth: Łódź, Poland
- Height: 1.82 m (6 ft 0 in)
- Position: Midfielder

Team information
- Current team: Boruta Zgierz
- Number: 5

Youth career
- ŁKS Łódź

Senior career*
Years	Team	Apps	(Gls)
2002–2003	UKS SMS Łódź		
2003–2006	Heko Czermno		
2006–2007	KS Paradyż		
2007–2008	Znicz Pruszków	32	(2)
2008–2011	Jagiellonia Białystok	36	(4)
2010–2011	→ Arka Gdynia (loan)	25	(1)
2011–2012	Zawisza Bydgoszcz	40	(7)
2013–2014	Korona Kielce	7	(0)
2013	→ Górnik Łęczna (loan)	26	(3)
2014–2020	Chojniczanka Chojnice	147	(22)
2020–2021	Bytovia Bytów	47	(9)
2021	RKS Radomsko	3	(1)
2021–2024	AKS SMS Łódź	79	(24)
2024–	Boruta Zgierz	55	(20)
- * Club domestic league appearances and goals as of 12:10, 24 June 2024 (UTC)

Paweł Zawistowski (born 11 March 1984) is a Polish professional footballer who plays as a midfielder for IV liga Łódź club Boruta Zgierz.

== Career ==
In June 2010, Zawistowski was loaned to Arka Gdynia on a one-year deal. He was released from Arka Gdynia on 30 June 2011.

In July 2011, he moved to Zawisza Bydgoszcz.

== Honours ==
Jagiellonia

- Polish Cup: 2009–10

AKS SMS Łódź

- Regional league Łódź: 2021–22

Boruta Zgierz

- Regional league Łódź: 2024–25

Individual

- I liga Player of the Year: 2017
