= Bartosz Machaj =

Polish footballer

Personal information
- Full name: Bartosz Machaj
- Date of birth: 30 April 1993 (age 33)
- Place of birth: Głogów, Poland
- Height: 1.77 m (5 ft 9 1/2 in)
- Position: Midfielder

Team information
- Current team: RKS Radomsko
- Number: 7

Youth career
- UKS SP Głogów
- Amica Wronki
- Lech Poznań

Senior career*
Years	Team	Apps	(Gls)
2010–2013	Chrobry Głogów	73	(11)
2014–2015	Miedź Legnica	15	(0)
2015	Śląsk Wrocław	0	(0)
2015	Śląsk Wrocław II	8	(1)
2015–2019	Chrobry Głogów	77	(7)
2019–2020	Elana Toruń	22	(3)
2020–2021	Unia Janikowo	14	(2)
2021–	RKS Radomsko	137	(52)
- * Club domestic league appearances and goals as of 16:34, 24 June 2025 (UTC)

Bartosz Machaj (born 30 April 1993) is a Polish footballer who plays as a midfielder for IV liga Łódź club RKS Radomsko.

== Career ==
On 22 June 2019 Elana Toruń confirmed, that they had signed Machaj on a one-year contract.

== Honours ==
Chrobry Głogów

- III liga Lower Silesia–Lubusz: 2010–11
- Polish Cup (Legnica regionals): 2010–11

RKS Radomsko

- Polish Cup (Łódź regionals): 2021–22
