= MKS Ruch Zdzieszowice =

Polish football club

Ruch Zdzieszowice
- Full name: Miejski Klub Sportowy Ruch Zdzieszowice
- Founded: 1969; 57 years ago
- Ground: Municipal Stadium
- Capacity: 3,000
- Manager: Adrian Pajączkowski
- League: IV liga Opole
- 2025–26: IV liga Opole, 2nd of 14
Home colours	Away colours

Miejski Klub Sportowy Ruch Zdzieszowice (MKS Ruch Zdzieszowice) is a Polish football club in Zdzieszowice, Opole Voivodeship. Ruch currently plays in the Opole group of fifth-tier IV liga. They play home games at the Stadion Miejski. The club also has other sports sections including weightlifting, cycling, cards, women's football, athletics, and boxing.

== History ==
Before 1965, the club went under many different names such as "Robotniczy" Sports Club, "Anna" and "Unia". Finally, in 1965 the club was named "Ruch" and still harbors this name to the present day.

Since the beginning of the reign football club, the women's handball teams have enjoyed a lot of success. In the '70s, Małgorzata Wieczorek, Brygida Paterok and other girls with Zdzieszowice constituted the core team at that time Polish champions - Otmęt Krapkowice.

The faithful fans of the club are pensioners, they are exempt from payment of premiums and the club includes events for free. In the 90s, Jerzy Woźniak was president - chairman of the Committee of NSZZ Solidarity Works. In his younger years as a football player, he played for Start Łódź, before moving in Zdzieszowice to 1974 to play for Korona Krępna LZS.

In years past, on the occasion of "Player of the Day", Zdzieszowice has hosted such clubs as the Ruch Chorzów, Raków Częstochowa, Polonia Bytom and Zagłębie Sosnowiec.

Since the 2006–07 season, the club went on a run of successive promotions, resulting in earning a right to compete in the II liga in 2010.

== Club honours ==
- II liga
  - Sixth place: 2010–11 (West)
- Polish Cup (Opole regionals)
  - Winners: 2008–09, 2009–10, 2020–21
