= Adrian Klepczyński =

Polish footballer

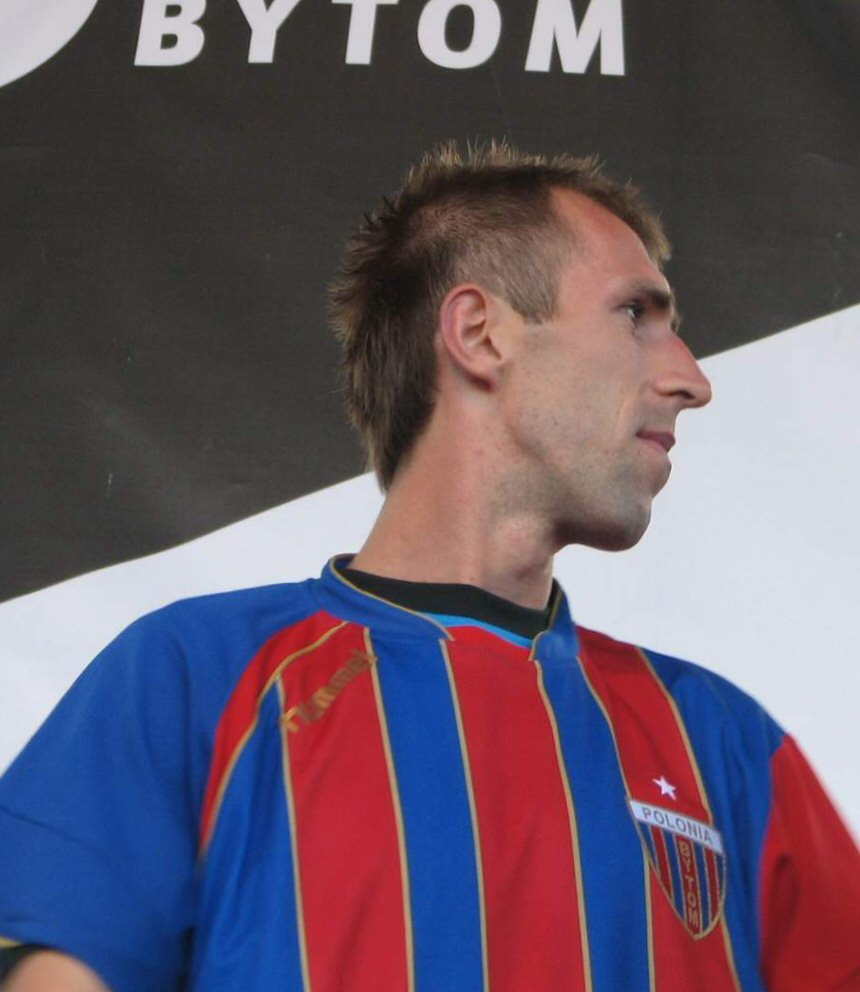

Personal information
- Full name: Adrian Klepczyński
- Date of birth: 1 April 1981 (age 45)
- Place of birth: Częstochowa, Poland
- Height: 1.87 m (6 ft 1 1/2 in)
- Position: Defender

Team information
- Current team: Płomień Czarny Las
- Number: 20

Senior career*
| Years | Team | Apps | (Gls) |
| 1999–2000 | Raków Częstochowa | | |
| 2001 | Warta Działoszyn | | |
| 2001–2003 | RKS Radomsko | 38 | (0) |
| 2004 | Stal Głowno | | |
| 2004–2006 | Widzew Łódź | 37 | (1) |
| 2006–2010 | Polonia Bytom | 72 | (3) |
| 2010–2015 | Piast Gliwice | 142 | (2) |
| 2015–2016 | Raków Częstochowa | 25 | (3) |
| 2016–2018 | GKS Bełchatów | 41 | (2) |
| 2018 | MKS Kluczbork | 10 | (1) |
| 2018–2020 | RKS Radomsko | 40 | (4) |
| 2020–2021 | Warta Mstów | 47 | (19) |
| 2022 | Unia Rędziny | 15 | (2) |
| 2022–2023 | Płomień Kuźnica Marianowa | 25 | (4) |
| 2023– | Płomień Czarny Las | 34 | (5) |
- * Club domestic league appearances and goals as of 21 December 2024

Adrian Klepczyński (born 1 April 1981) is a Polish footballer who plays as a defender for Płomień Czarny Las.

== Honours ==
Widzew Łódź

- II liga: 2005–06

Piast Gliwice

- I liga: 2011–12

RKS Radomsko

- IV liga Łódź: 2018–19

== Notes ==
- Adrian Klepczyński at 90minut.pl (in Polish)
- Adrian Klepczyński at Soccerway (archived)
