= Sokół Ostróda =

Polish football club

- Full name: Ostródzki Klub Sportowy; Sokół Ostróda
- Nickname: Sokoły (The Eagles)
- Founded: 1945; 81 years ago
- Ground: Municipal Stadium
- Capacity: 4,998
- Chairman: Tomasz Harazim
- Manager: Rafał Więckowski
- League: IV liga Warmia-Masuria
- 2025–26: IV liga Warmia-Masuria, 5th of 16
- Website: http://sokolostroda.com

Sokół Ostróda is a Polish football club based in Ostróda, Warmian-Masurian Voivodeship. They compete in the fifth-tier IV liga Warmia-Masuria. In 2020, they were promoted to II liga.
