= Wisła Puławy =

Polish football club

- Full name: Klub Sportowy Wisła Puławy
- Nickname: Duma Powiśla (The Pride of Powiśle)
- Founded: 1923; 103 years ago
- Ground: Municipal Sports & Recreation Stadium Puławy
- Capacity: 4,418
- Chairman: Łukasz Marczuk
- Manager: Radosław Adamczyk
- League: Klasa A Lublin
- 2025–26: Regional league Lublin, 15th of 15 (relegated)
- Website: www.kswislapulawy.pl
Home colours	Away colours

Klub Sportowy Wisła Puławy is a Polish football club based in Puławy, Lublin Voivodeship. They currently compete in the Klasa A.

From 2009 to 2025, Wisła spent most of the time playing in the third and fourth tiers of the Polish league system, and competed in the I liga in the 2016–17 season. At the end of the 2024–25 II liga season, Wisła withdrew from professional competition, demoting itself back to the lower tiers.

== Current squad ==
As of 31 March 2025

Note: Flags indicate national team as defined under FIFA eligibility rules; some limited exceptions apply. Players may hold more than one non-FIFA nationality.

No.	Pos.	Nation	Player
1	GK	POL	Krzysztof Wróblewski (on loan from Chrobry Głogów)
2	DF	POL	Patryk Waliś (on loan from Odra Opole)
3	DF	POL	Adam Gałązka
4	DF	POL	Miłosz Lewandowski (on loan from Motor Lublin)
5	MF	POL	Karol Dziedzic (on loan from Wisła Kraków)
6	DF	POL	Łukasz Kabaj (on loan from Raków Częstochowa)
7	FW	POL	Kacper Szymanek
8	MF	POL	Kamil Kumoch
9	FW	POL	Sebastian Kwaczreliszwili
10	MF	POL	Bartosz Wiktoruk
11	MF	POL	Kamil Kargulewicz (captain)
12	GK	POL	Kamil Bielikow
14	DF	POL	Bartosz Waleńcik
15	MF	POL	Bartłomiej Juszczyk
16	DF	POL	Dominik Cheba

No.	Pos.	Nation	Player
17	DF	POL	Radosław Śledzicki
18	FW	MEX	Manuel Ponce García
19	DF	POL	Bartosz Bernard
20	MF	POL	Sebastian Koziej (on loan from Motor Lublin)
21	DF	POL	Franciszek Polowiec
22	MF	POL	Franciszek Łuczuk
24	FW	POL	Danny Babor (on loan from Pogoń Siedlce)
25	MF	POL	Marcin Stromecki
—	MF	POL	Leonard Brykowski
—	MF	POL	Kamil Cholewa
—	MF	POL	Rafał Cholewa
—	MF	POL	Maciej Kiełkucki
—	GK	POL	Kacper Murat
—	MF	POL	Jakub Zych (on loan from Stal Rzeszów)

== Honours ==
- III liga
  - Champions: 2010–11 (Lublin–Subcarpathia), 2020–21 (group IV)
- Lublin Polish Cup (regional level)
  - Winners: 2008–09
