= Chojniczanka Chojnice =

Polish football club

- Full name: Miejski Klub Sportowy Chojniczanka 1930 Chojnice
- Founded: 10 March 1930; 96 years ago
- Ground: Chojniczanka 1930 Municipal Stadium
- Capacity: 3,000
- Chairman: Jarosław Klauzo
- Manager: Marek Brzozowski
- League: II liga
- 2025–26: II liga, 8th of 18
- Website: mkschojniczanka.pl
Home colours	Away colours

Chojniczanka Chojnice is a Polish football club located in Chojnice. As of the 2026–27 season, they compete in II liga. The team's colors are yellow, white and red.

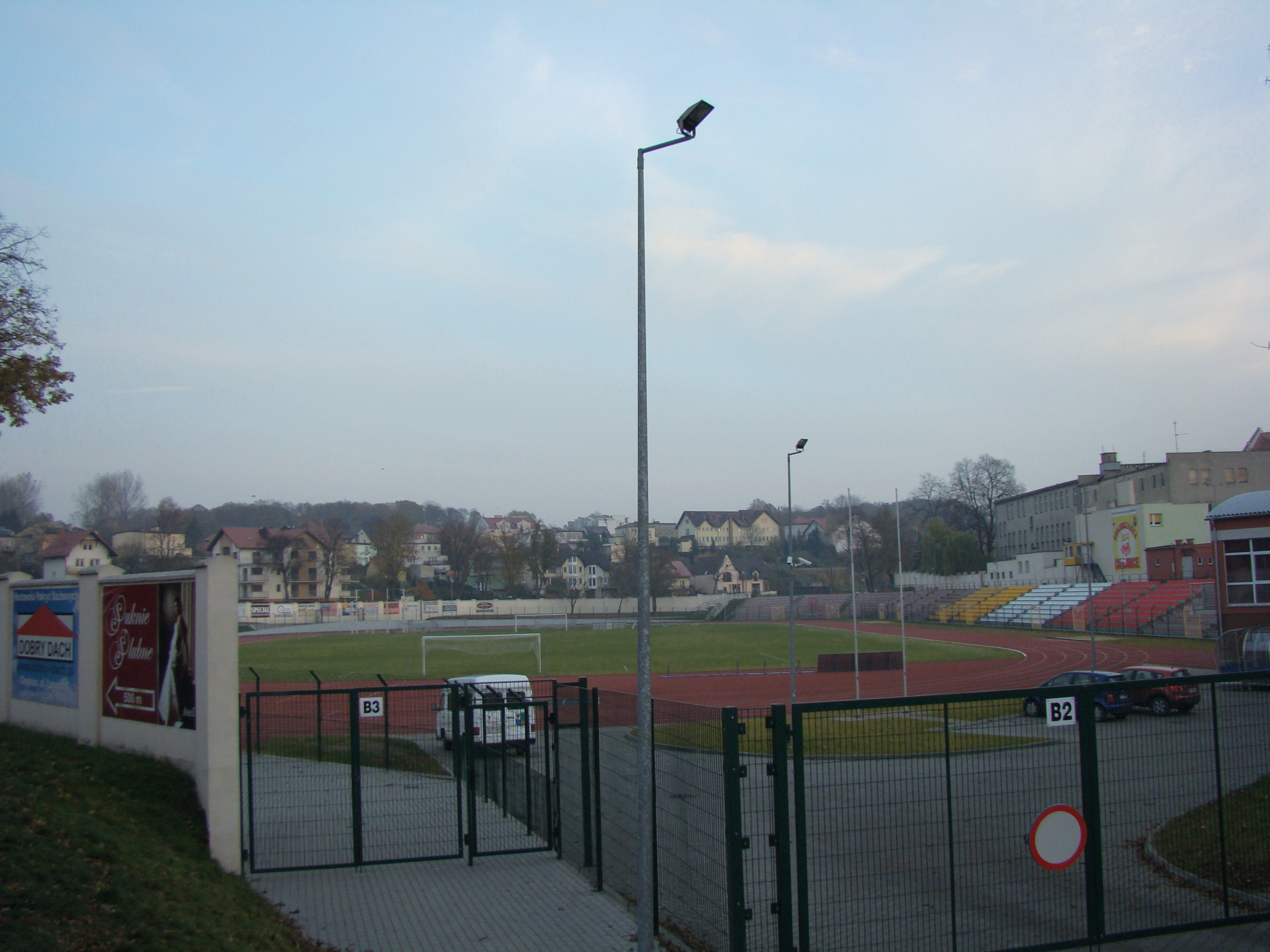
Chojniczanka 1930 Municipal Stadium

== Current squad ==
As of 16 September 2026

Note: Flags indicate national team as defined under FIFA eligibility rules; some limited exceptions apply. Players may hold more than one non-FIFA nationality.

No.	Pos.	Nation	Player
2	DF	POL	Mateusz Bąkowicz
3	DF	UKR	Dmytro Yukhymovych
6	DF	RUS	Ramil Mustafaev
7	MF	POL	Błażej Szczepanek
8	MF	POL	Szymon Stypułkowski (on loan from Jagiellonia Białystok II)
9	FW	POL	Hubert Sobol
10	MF	POL	Maciej Famulak
11	MF	POL	Konrad Janicki
19	DF	POL	Maksymilian Tkocz
20	FW	LVA	Valērijs Šabala (captain)
21	DF	POL	Jakub Goliński
22	GK	POL	Maksymilian Bydler
27	MF	POL	Hubert Adamczyk

No.	Pos.	Nation	Player
29	GK	POL	Damian Primel
30	MF	POL	Jakub Sobeczko (on loan from Ruch Chorzów)
33	DF	POL	Jakub Tecław
31	MF	POL	Jakub Żywicki
34	MF	POL	Damian Nowacki
43	DF	POL	Dawid Szot
44	DF	POL	Jan Smolarczyk
51	DF	POL	Mateusz Morek
67	MF	POL	Adrian Czyżewski
77	MF	POL	Jakub Pławski
80	MF	POL	Filip Mosek
88	GK	POL	Adrian Czerniewicz
97	FW	POL	Jakub Oleksiewicz
