= 2018–19 Górnik Zabrze season =

Górnik Zabrze
2018–19 season
- Manager: Marcin Brosz
- Stadium: Arena Zabrze
- Ekstraklasa: 11th
- Polish Cup: Quarter-finals
- UEFA Europa League: Second qualifying round
- Top goalscorer: League: Igor Angulo (24); All: Igor Angulo (28)
Home colours	Away colours	Third colours

The 2018–19 season was Górnik Zabrze's 2nd consecutive season in the Ekstraklasa and 70th year in existence as a football club. In addition to the domestic league, Górnik Zabrze participated in that season's editions of the Polish Cup and the UEFA Europa League.

== Squad ==
As of 8 April 2019

Note: Flags indicate national team as defined under FIFA eligibility rules; some limited exceptions apply. Players may hold more than one non-FIFA nationality.

No.	Pos.	Nation	Player
1	GK	POL	Tomasz Loska
2	DF	POL	Przemysław Wiśniewski
3	DF	SVK	Boris Sekulić
4	DF	ISL	Adam Örn Arnarson
5	DF	POL	Paweł Bochniewicz
7	MF	POL	Szymon Żurkowski
8	MF	GEO	Valerian Gvilia
9	MF	ESP	Jesús Jiménez
10	MF	POL	Łukasz Wolsztyński
11	MF	POL	Daniel Liszka
13	DF	POL	Kacper Michalski
14	DF	POL	Michał Koj
15	DF	ESP	Dani Suárez
17	FW	ESP	Igor Angulo

No.	Pos.	Nation	Player
18	MF	POL	Wojciech Hajda
19	FW	POL	Kamil Zapolnik
20	MF	GHA	Ishmael Baidoo
22	MF	POL	Szymon Matuszek
23	MF	POL	Mateusz Matras
24	DF	POL	Bartłomiej Eizenchart
25	MF	POL	Krzysztof Kubica
27	DF	POL	Adrian Gryszkiewicz
28	MF	POL	Maciej Ambrosiewicz
33	GK	POL	Daniel Bielica
45	MF	POL	Adam Ryczkowski
77	MF	GRE	Giannis Mystakidis
84	GK	SVK	Martin Chudý

== Transfers ==
In:

No.	Pos.	Nation	Player
6	MF	POL	Wiktor Biedrzycki (From Stomil Olsztyn)
9	FW	ESP	Jesús Jiménez (From (Spain) Talavera)
45	FW	POL	Adam Ryczkowski (From Legia Warsaw)
—	MF	POL	Filip Żagiel (Return from Odra Opole)

Out:

No.	Pos.	Nation	Player
4	DF	POL	Mateusz Wieteska (To Legia Warsaw)
5	DF	UKR	Oleksandr Shevelyukhin
7	MF	POL	Rafał Kurzawa (To (France) Amiens)
9	MF	POL	Damian Kądzior (To (Croatia) Dinamo Zagreb)
10	MF	SVK	Erik Grendel (To (Slovakia) Spartak Trnava)
11	FW	CZE	David Ledecký (To (Czech Republic) České Budějovice, previously on loan at Odra Opole)
21	MF	SLO	Sandi Arčon
96	GK	POL	Mateusz Kuchta (To Zagłębie Lubin, previously on loan at Odra Opole)
99	GK	POL	Grzegorz Kasprzik

== Competitions ==
=== Overview ===
Competition	First match	Last match	Starting round	Final position	Record							
Competition	First match	Last match	Starting round	Final position	Pld	W	D	L	GF	GA	GD	Win %
Ekstraklasa	22 July 2018	18 May 2019	Matchday 1	11th	37	12	10	15	48	53	−5	32.43
Polish Cup	2 October 2018	27 February 2019	Round of 64	Quarter-finals	4	3	0	1	15	3	+12	75.00
UEFA Europa League	12 July 2018	2 August 2018	First qualifying round	Second qualifying round	4	1	1	2	3	6	−3	25.00
Total					45	16	11	18	66	62	+4	35.56

Source: Competitions

=== Ekstraklasa ===
==== Results summary ====
Overall								Home						Away					
Pld	W	D	L	GF	GA	GD	Pts	W	D	L	GF	GA	GD	W	D	L	GF	GA	GD
37	12	10	15	48	53	−5	46	5	6	8	23	25	−2	7	4	7	25	28	−3

Source: Competitions

==== Regular season ====
===== League table =====
Pos	Team	Pld	W	D	L	GF	GA	GD	Pts	Qualification
10	Korona Kielce	30	10	10	10	35	44	−9	40	Qualification for the Relegation round
11	Miedź Legnica	30	8	8	14	30	52	−22	32	Qualification for the Relegation round
12	Górnik Zabrze	30	7	10	13	36	49	−13	31 (Note: Head-to-head record: Górnik Zabrze 2–2 Śląsk Wrocław, Śląsk Wrocław 0–1 Górnik Zabrze.)	Qualification for the Relegation round
13	Śląsk Wrocław	30	8	7	15	35	37	−2	31	Qualification for the Relegation round
14	Wisła Płock	30	7	9	14	40	49	−9	30	Qualification for the Relegation round

Source: Ekstraklasa, 90minut
Rules for classification: 1) Points; 2) Head-to-head points; 3) Head-to-head goal difference; 4) Head-to-head goals scored; 5) Head-to-head away goals scored (only if two teams); 6) Goal difference; 7) Goals scored; 8) Fairplay ranking; 9) Draw. (Note: Head-to-head record is used only after all the matches between the teams in question have been played.)

===== Matches =====
22 July 2018 1	Górnik Zabrze	1–1	Korona Kielce	Zabrze
15:30 CEST (UTC+2)	M. Urynowicz (yellow card) 33'; Smuga 46'; Wiśniewski (yellow card) 89'	Report	Soriano (yellow card) 5'; Żubrowski (yellow card) 12'; Malarczyk (yellow card) 55'; Jukić 62'	Stadium: Arena Zabrze; Referee: Daniel Stefański

29 July 2018 2	Górnik Zabrze	1–1	Wisła Płock	Zabrze
15:30 CEST (UTC+2)	Angulo 75'	Report	Ricardinho 46'	Stadium: Arena Zabrze; Referee: Tomasz Musiał

5 August 2018 3	Miedź Legnica	1–3	Górnik Zabrze	Legnica
18:00 CEST (UTC+2)	Piątkowski 27'	Report	Suárez 73'; Angulo 76'; Żurkowski 87'	Stadium: Stadion Miejski; Referee: Tomasz Kwiatkowski

11 August 2018 4	Arka Gdynia	1–1	Górnik Zabrze	Gdynia
20:30 CEST (UTC+2)	Janota 88'	Report	Suárez 45+2'	Stadium: Gdynia Stadium; Referee: Jarosław Przybył

18 August 2018 5	Górnik Zabrze	0–2	Lechia Gdańsk	Zabrze
20:30 CEST (UTC+2)		Report	Bochniewicz 23' (o.g.); Paixão 33'	Stadium: Arena Zabrze; Referee: Krzysztof Jakubik

25 August 2018 6	Wisła Kraków	3–0	Górnik Zabrze	Kraków
20:30 CEST (UTC+2)	Pietrzak 18'; Ondrášek 22'; Basha 49'	Report		Stadium: Henryk Reyman Stadium; Referee: Bartosz Frankowski

31 August 2018 7	Górnik Zabrze	1–1	Pogoń Szczecin	Zabrze
18:00 CEST (UTC+2)	Angulo 71' (pen.)	Report	Majewski 51'	Stadium: Arena Zabrze; Referee: Wojciech Myć

17 September 2018 8	Zagłębie Sosnowiec	1–1	Górnik Zabrze	Sosnowiec
18:00 CEST (UTC+2)	Sanogo 17'	Report	Angulo 85'	Stadium: Sosnowiec People's Stadium; Referee: Mariusz Złotek

23 September 2018 9	Górnik Zabrze	1–3	Jagiellonia Białystok	Zabrze
18:00 CEST (UTC+2)	Angulo 3'	Report	Bezjak 54'; Novikovas 62'; Frankowski 89'	Stadium: Arena Zabrze; Referee: Bartosz Frankowski

29 September 2018 10	Piast Gliwice	1–0	Górnik Zabrze	Gliwice
15:30 CEST (UTC+2)	Badía 72'	Report		Stadium: Stadion Piast; Referee: Tomasz Musiał

5 October 2018 11	Górnik Zabrze	2–2	Lech Poznań	Zabrze
15:30 CEST (UTC+2)	Jiménez 7'; Żurkowski 49'	Report	Pedro Tiba 56'; Kostevych 77'	Stadium: Arena Zabrze; Referee: Tomasz Kwiatkowski

22 October 2018 12	Cracovia	2–0	Górnik Zabrze	Kraków
18:00 CEST (UTC+2)	Airam 62'; Hernández 63'	Report		Stadium: Józef Piłsudski Cracovia Stadium; Referee: Tomasz Kwiatkowski

28 October 2018 13	Górnik Zabrze	2–0	Zagłębie Lubin	Zabrze
18:00 CET (UTC+1)	Angulo 38' (pen.), 46'	Report		Stadium: Arena Zabrze; Referee: Dominik Sulikowski

3 November 2018 14	Legia Warsaw	4–0	Górnik Zabrze	Warsaw
20:30 CET (UTC+1)	Carlitos 13', 81'; Kucharczyk 29' (pen.); Nagy 37'	Report		Stadium: Polish Army Stadium; Referee: Wojciech Myć

9 November 2018 15	Górnik Zabrze	2–2	Śląsk Wrocław	Zabrze
18:00 CET (UTC+1)	Suárez 26'; Jiménez 40'	Report	Chrapek 22'; Pich 60'	Stadium: Arena Zabrze; Referee: Paweł Raczkowski

24 November 2018 16	Korona Kielce	4–2	Górnik Zabrze	Kielce
15:30 CET (UTC+1)	Diaw 8'; Soriano 17', 41'; Cebula 37'	Report	Angulo 19' (pen.), 89'	Stadium: Kielce Stadium; Referee: Szymon Marciniak

1 December 2018 17	Wisła Płock	0–4	Górnik Zabrze	Płock
15:30 CET (UTC+1)	Dźwigała (yellow card) 70'	Report	Zapolnik 42'; Angulo 50', 66'; M. Urynowicz 90+4', (yellow card) 90+4'	Stadium: Kazimierz Górski Stadium; Referee: Daniel Stefański

9 December 2018 18	Górnik Zabrze	1–3	Miedź Legnica	Zabrze
15:30 CET (UTC+1)	Angulo 90'	Report	Loska 36' (o.g.); Forsell 53' (pen.); Ojamaa 61'	Stadium: Arena Zabrze; Referee: Krzysztof Jakubik

15 December 2018 19	Górnik Zabrze	1–1	Arka Gdynia	Zabrze
18:00 CET (UTC+1)	Suárez 31'	Report	Nalepa 57'	Stadium: Arena Zabrze; Referee: Łukasz Szczech

22 December 2018 20	Lechia Gdańsk	4–0	Górnik Zabrze	Gdańsk
18:00 CET (UTC+1)	Sobiech 14'; Wolski 51'; Mladenović 55'; Paixão 72'	Report		Stadium: Stadion Energa Gdańsk; Referee: Bartosz Frankowski

11 February 2019 21	Górnik Zabrze	2–0	Wisła Kraków	Zabrze
18:00 CET (UTC+1)	Matras 10', 37'	Report		Stadium: Arena Zabrze; Referee: Jarosław Przybył

15 February 2019 22	Pogoń Szczecin	3–1	Górnik Zabrze	Szczecin
18:00 CET (UTC+1)	Majewski 18'; Kožulj 27'; Malec 50'	Report	Angulo 12' (pen.)	Stadium: Florian Krygier Stadium; Referee: Paweł Raczkowski

23 February 2019 23	Górnik Zabrze	2–1	Zagłębie Sosnowiec	Zabrze
15:30 CET (UTC+1)	Gvilia 12'; Angulo 60'	Report	Udovičić 51'	Stadium: Arena Zabrze; Referee: Bartosz Frankowski

2 March 2019 24	Jagiellonia Białystok	2–2	Górnik Zabrze	Białystok
18:00 CET (UTC+1)	Guilherme 23' (pen.); Novikovas 57'	Report	Żurkowski 25'; Angulo 89'	Stadium: Białystok Stadium; Referee: Jarosław Przybył

8 March 2019 25	Górnik Zabrze	0–2	Piast Gliwice	Zabrze
18:00 CET (UTC+1)		Report	Kirkeskov 36'; Sedlar 85' (pen.)	Stadium: Arena Zabrze; Referee: Szymon Marciniak

15 March 2019 26	Lech Poznań	0–3	Górnik Zabrze	Poznań
20:30 CET (UTC+1)		Report	Angulo 41', 86'; Sekulić 67'	Stadium: Poznań Stadium; Referee: Bartosz Frankowski

29 March 2019 27	Górnik Zabrze	0–1	Cracovia	Zabrze
20:30 CET (UTC+1)		Report	Airam 19'	Stadium: Arena Zabrze; Referee: Wojciech Myć

2 April 2019 28	Zagłębie Lubin	1–1	Górnik Zabrze	Lubin
20:30 CEST (UTC+2)	Pawłowski 83'	Report	Matras 79'	Stadium: Lubin Stadium; Referee: Łukasz Szczech

7 April 2019 29	Górnik Zabrze	1–2	Legia Warsaw	Zabrze
18:00 CEST (UTC+2)	Angulo 28'	Report	Carlitos 76' (pen.), 87'	Stadium: Arena Zabrze; Referee: Mariusz Złotek

13 April 2019 30	Śląsk Wrocław	0–1	Górnik Zabrze	Wrocław
18:00 CEST (UTC+2)		Report	Jiménez 85'	Stadium: Wrocław Stadium; Referee: Tomasz Kwiatkowski

==== Relegation round ====
===== League table =====
Pos	Team	Pld	W	D	L	GF	GA	GD	Pts
9	Wisła Kraków	37	14	7	16	67	63	+4	49
10	Korona Kielce	37	12	11	14	42	54	−12	47
11	Górnik Zabrze	37	12	10	15	48	53	−5	46
12	Śląsk Wrocław	37	12	8	17	49	45	+4	44
13	Arka Gdynia	37	10	12	15	49	51	−2	42

Source: Ekstraklasa, 90minut
Rules for classification: 1) Points; 2) Points in regular season; 3) Head-to-head points in regular season; 4) Head-to-head goal difference in regular season; 5) Head-to-head goals scored in regular season; 5) Head-to-head away goals scored in regular season (if only two teams); 7) Goal difference; 8) Goals scored; 9) Fairplay ranking; 10) Play-off (only if needed to decide champion, teams for relegation or teams for UEFA competitions).

===== Matches =====
22 April 2019 31	Górnik Zabrze	1–0	Arka Gdynia	Zabrze
18:00 CEST (UTC+2)	Zapolnik 53'	Report		Stadium: Arena Zabrze; Referee: Paweł Gil

25 April 2019 32	Śląsk Wrocław	1–2	Górnik Zabrze	Wrocław
20:30 CEST (UTC+2)	Robak 4' (pen.)	Report	Angulo 53' (pen.), 79'	Stadium: Wrocław Stadium; Referee: Szymon Marciniak

29 April 2019 33	Górnik Zabrze	4–0	Zagłębie Sosnowiec	Zabrze
18:00 CEST (UTC+2)	Sekulić 28'; Jiménez 38'; Angulo 43', 78'	Report		Stadium: Arena Zabrze; Referee: Piotr Lasyk

3 May 2019 34	Górnik Zabrze	1–2	Wisła Kraków	Zabrze
20:30 CEST (UTC+2)	Jiménez 37'	Report	Kolar 34' (pen.), 51'	Stadium: Arena Zabrze; Referee: Paweł Gil

11 May 2019 35	Miedź Legnica	0–1	Górnik Zabrze	Legnica
18:00 CEST (UTC+2)		Report	Bochniewicz 69'	Stadium: Stadion Miejski; Referee: Paweł Raczkowski

14 May 2019 36	Górnik Zabrze	0–1	Wisła Płock	Zabrze
20:30 CEST (UTC+2)		Report	Merebashvili 7'	Stadium: Arena Zabrze; Referee: Łukasz Szczech

18 May 2019 37	Korona Kielce	0–3	Górnik Zabrze	Kielce
15:30 CEST (UTC+2)		Report	Angulo 69', 90'; Wolsztyński 87'	Stadium: Kielce Stadium; Referee: Łukasz Szczech

=== Polish Cup ===
2 October 2018 Round of 64	Unia Hrubieszów	0–9	Górnik Zabrze	Hrubieszów
15:00 CEST (UTC+2)		Report	Smuga 12', 34'; Żurkowski 16', 90+1'; Angulo 41'; Zapolnik 51', 68'; Jiménez 65'; Ambrosiewicz 82'	Stadium: Stadion Miejski; Referee: Mateusz Złotnicki

31 October 2018 Round of 32	Legionovia Legionowo	0–1	Górnik Zabrze	Legionowo
13:00 CET (UTC+1)		Report	Angulo 17'	Stadium: Father Jan Mrugacz Stadium; Referee: Łukasz Szczech

6 December 2018 Round of 16	Rozwój Katowice	1–4 (a.e.t.)	Górnik Zabrze	Katowice
12:15 CET (UTC+1)	Płonka 27'	Report	Jiménez 34'; Zapolnik 108'; Matuszek 113'; Wolsztyński 120+3' (pen.)	Stadium: Stadion Rozwoj; Referee: Artur Aluszyk

27 February 2019 Quarter-finals	Górnik Zabrze	1–2	Lechia Gdańsk	Zabrze
20:30 CET (UTC+1)	Angulo 90+6' (pen.)	Report	Mak 33'; Makowski 85'	Stadium: Arena Zabrze; Referee: Tomasz Musiał

=== UEFA Europa League ===
==== Qualifying rounds ====
===== First qualifying round =====
12 July 2018 First leg	Górnik Zabrze (Poland)	1–0	(Moldova) Zaria Bălți	Zabrze, Poland
20:00 CEST (UTC+2)	Jiménez (yellow card) 38'; Żurkowski (yellow card) 53' (yellow-red card) 90+0'; Angulo 87'	Report	Yermak (yellow card) 62'	Stadium: Arena Zabrze; Attendance: 19,528; Referee: Filip Glova (Slovakia)

19 July 2018 Second leg	Zaria Bălți (Moldova)	1–1 (1–2 agg.)	(Poland) Górnik Zabrze	Chișinău, Moldova (Note: The match was played at the Zimbru Stadium in Chișinău, instead of Zaria Bălți regular stadium, the Stadionul Orășenesc in Bălți.)
20:00 EEST (UTC+3)	Guilherme 7', (yellow card) 78'; Yermak (yellow card) 65'	Report	Ambrosiewicz (yellow card) 30'; Koj (yellow card) 77'; Smuga 85'	Stadium: Zimbru Stadium; Attendance: 1,300; Referee: Rahim Hasanov (Azerbaijan)
Note: Górnik Zabrze won 2–1 on aggregate.

===== Second qualifying round =====
26 July 2018 First leg	Górnik Zabrze (Poland)	0–1	(Slovakia) Trenčín	Zabrze, Poland
20:00 CEST (UTC+2)	Wolniewicz (yellow card) 42'; Smuga (yellow card) 59'; Angulo (yellow card) 65'	Report	Yem (yellow card) 24'; Azango 39'; Šemrinec (yellow card) 86'	Stadium: Arena Zabrze; Attendance: 12,859; Referee: Mattias Gestranius (Finland)

2 August 2018 Second leg	Trenčín (Slovakia)	4–1 (5–1 agg.)	(Poland) Górnik Zabrze	Myjava, Slovakia (Note: The match was played at the Stadium Myjava in Myjava, instead of Žilina regular stadium, the Štadión na Sihoti in Trenčín due to renovation.)
17:30 CEST (UTC+2)	Angulo 10' (o.g.); Čataković 20', 90'; El Mahdioui (yellow card) 23'; Azango 59'	Report	Matuszek (yellow card) 51'; Smuga 60'	Stadium: Stadium Myjava; Attendance: 1,897; Referee: Ole Hobber Nilsen (Norway)
Note: Trenčín won 5–1 on aggregate.

== Awards ==
=== Ekstraklasa top scorer ===
Player	Goals	Ref
(Spain) Igor Angulo	24	
