= 2024–25 Stal Mielec season =

Stal Mielec
2024–25 season
- Manager: Kamil Kiereś
- Stadium: Mielec Stadium
- Ekstraklasa: 16th (relegated to I liga)
Home colours	Away colours	Third colours

The 2024–25 season was the 86th season in the history of Stal Mielec, and the club's fifth consecutive season in Ekstraklasa. In addition to the domestic league, the team participated in the Polish Cup.

== Transfers ==
=== In ===
Pos.	Player	Transferred from	Fee	Date	Source
MF	(Poland) Fryderyk Gerbowski	(Poland) Wisła Płock	Free	1 July 2024	
MF	(Poland) Dawid Tkacz	(Poland) Widzew Łódź	Loan	1 July 2024	
MF	(Finland) Pyry Hannola	(Finland) SJK	Loan	5 January 2025	

=== Out ===
Pos.	Player	Transferred to	Fee	Date	Source
GK	(United States) David Poręba	(United States) Chicago Fire FC II	Undisclosed	1 July 2024	

== Friendlies ==
=== Pre-season ===
26 June 2024 Friendly	Stal Mielec (Poland)	2–2	(Poland) Resovia	Wola Chorzelowska
11:00

29 June 2024 Friendly	Stal Mielec (Poland)	0–1	(Poland) Sandecja Nowy Sącz
11:00			Wolsztyński 39'

6 July 2024 Friendly	Stal Mielec (Poland)	1–3	(Poland) ŁKS Łódź	Wola Chorzelowska
11:00

12 July 2024 Friendly	Stal Mielec (Poland)	5–0	(Poland) Stal Rzeszów	Wola Chorzelowska
10:00				Stadium: Hotel Rado

=== Mid-season ===
16 January 2025 Friendly	Stal Mielec (Poland)	2–0	(Sweden) IF Elfsborg

== Competitions ==
=== Overall record ===
Competition	First match	Last match	Starting round	Record							
Competition	First match	Last match	Starting round	Pld	W	D	L	GF	GA	GD	Win %
Ekstraklasa	22 July 2024	24–25 May 2025	Matchday 1	4	0	1	3	1	5	−4	0.00
Polish Cup				0	0	0	0	0	0	+0	—
Total				4	0	1	3	1	5	−4	0.00

Last updated: 10 August 2024
Source: Soccerway

=== Ekstraklasa ===
==== League table ====
Pos	Team	Pld	W	D	L	GF	GA	GD	Pts	Qualification or relegation
14	Lechia Gdańsk	34	10	7	17	44	59	−15	37	
15	Zagłębie Lubin	34	10	6	18	33	51	−18	36	
16	Stal Mielec (R)	34	7	10	17	39	56	−17	31	Relegation to I liga
17	Śląsk Wrocław (R)	34	6	12	16	38	53	−15	30	Relegation to I liga
18	Puszcza Niepołomice (R)	34	6	10	18	37	63	−26	28	Relegation to I liga

Source: ekstraklasa.org 90minut.pl
Rules for classification: 1) Points; 2) Head-to-head points; 3) Head-to-head goal difference; 4) Goal difference; 5) Goals scored; 6) Number of wins; 7) Number of away wins; 8) Lower number of points based on yellow and red cards (red card = 3 points, yellow card = 1 point, sending-off = 3 points - including 1 point for first yellow card); 9) Fairplay ranking; 10) Draw.
(Note: Head-to-head record is used only after all the matches between the teams in question have been played)
(R) Relegated

==== Matches ====
Round	Date	Time	Opponent	Venue	Result F–A	Scorers	Attendance	Ref.
1	22 July 2024	21:00	Widzew Łódź	Home	1–1	Szkuryn 45+2'	6,446	
2	27 July 2024	14:45	GKS Katowice	Home	0–1		5,565	
3	3 August 2024	19:30	Jagiellonia Białystok	Away	0–2		15,719	
4	10 August 2024	20:15	Pogoń Szczecin	Away	0–1		17,169	
5	19 August 2024	19:00	Piast Gliwice	Home	2–0	Szkuryn 79', Assayag 84'	4,308	
6	26 August 2024	19:00	Korona Kielce	Away	1–2	Domański 86'	11,057	
7	30 August 2024	20:30	Lech Poznań	Home	0–2		6,477	
9	22 September 2024	12:15	Motor Lublin	Home	1–0	Krykun 50'	5,210	
10	30 September 2024	19:00	Cracovia	Away	1–1	Guillaumier 30'	8,873	
11	5 October 2024	12:15	Lechia Gdańsk	Home	2–1	Wlazło 58', Wolsztyński 90+2'	3,932	
12	20 October 2024	14:45	Górnik Zabrze	Away	1–3	Wlazło 39'	14,130	
8	23 October 2024	18:30	Śląsk Wrocław	Away	1–2	Wolsztyński 69'	13,825	
13	27 October 2024	12:15	Zagłębie Lubin	Home	2–2	Wlazło 33' pen., Senger 57'	3,845	
14	2 November 2024	14:45	Raków Częstochowa	Away	0–1		5,287	
15	10 November 2024	12:15	Puszcza Niepołomice	Home	2–0	Szkuryn 67', 74'	3,832	
16	24 November 2024	12:15	Radomiak Radom	Away	2–1	Wlazło 32' pen., Szkuryn 45'	6,555	
17	1 December 2024	17:30	Legia Warsaw	Home	2–2	Wlazło 28' pen., Wolsztyński 90+1'	6,337	
18	7 December 2024	17:30	Widzew Łódź	Away	1–2	Wlazło 40' pen.	15,136	
19	31 January 2025	18:00	GKS Katowice	Away	0–1		7,067	
20	7 February 2025	18:00	Jagiellonia Białystok	Home	2–1	Dadok 22', Wlazło 29' pen.	5,039	
21	16 February 2025	12:15	Pogoń Szczecin	Home	1–2	Matras 89'	4,239	
22	21 February 2025	18:00	Piast Gliwice	Away	2–2	Getinger 36', Wlazło 53' pen.	3,634	
23	1 March 2025	14:45	Korona Kielce	Home	0–1		4,778	
24	8 March 2025	20:15	Lech Poznań	Away	1–3	Dadok 41'	23,281	
25	15 March 2025	14:45	Śląsk Wrocław	Home	1–4	Wlazło 18' pen.	3,612	
26	30 March 2025	14:45	Motor Lublin	Away	1–4	Wołkowicz 90+8'	14,195	
27	4 April 2025	18:00	Cracovia	Home	1–1	Wolsztyński 11'	5,184	
28	14 April 2025	19:00	Lechia Gdańsk	Away	2–3	Gerbowski 34', Cavaleiro 42'	7,501	
29	22 April 2025	19:00	Górnik Zabrze	Home	0–0		4,943	
30	28 April 2025	19:00	Zagłębie Lubin	Away	2–2	Jaunzems 55', Dadok 65'	3,873	
31	3 May 2025	14:45	Raków Częstochowa	Home	0–2		5,893	
32	12 May 2025	19:00	Puszcza Niepołomice	Away	3–2	Guillaumier 5', Matras 25', Wlazło 37' pen.	2,000	
33	16 May 2025	18:00	Radomiak Radom	Home	2–2	Cavaleiro 45', Guillaumier 73'	4,418	
34	24 May 2025	17:30	Legia Warsaw	Away	2–2	Wolsztyński 57' pen., Matras 77'	25,344	

=== Polish Cup ===
Polish Cup match details
Round	Date	Time	Opponent	Venue	Result F–A	Scorers	Attendance	Ref.
First round	25 September 2024	17:30	Korona Kielce	Away	1–1 (3–4 p)	Dadok 83'	6,053	
