= Wolsztynski =

Wolsztynski or Wolsztyński may refer to:

== Wolsztynski ==
- Richard Wolsztynski {b. 1948}, French Air Force general

== Wolsztyński ==
- Łukasz Wolsztyński (b. 1994), a Polish footballer
- Rafał Wolsztyński (b. 1994), a Polish footballer

== See also ==
- Wolsztyn County, a Polish county
