= 2018–19 in Polish football =

Football in Poland
- Season: 2018–19

2018–19 in Polish football
- Ekstraklasa champions
- Piast Gliwice
- Polish Cup winner
- Lechia Gdańsk
- Polish Super Cup winner
- Arka Gdynia
- Teams in Europe
- Legia Warsaw; Jagiellonia Białystok; Lech Poznań; Górnik Zabrze
- Poland national team
- 2018–19 UEFA Nations League; UEFA Euro 2020 qualifying
- Poland national under-21 team
- 2019 UEFA European Under-21 Championship

The 2018–19 season was the 94th season of competitive football in Poland.

== League competitions ==
=== Ekstraklasa ===
==== Regular season ====
Pos	Team	Pld	W	D	L	GF	GA	GD	Pts	Qualification
1	Lechia Gdańsk	30	17	9	4	45	25	+20	60 (Note: Head-to-head record: Legia Warsaw 0–0 Lechia Gdańsk, Lechia Gdańsk 0–0 Legia Warsaw. Goal difference: Lechia Gdańsk (+20), Legia Warsaw (+17))	Qualification for the Championship round
2	Legia Warsaw	30	18	6	6	48	31	+17	60	Qualification for the Championship round
3	Piast Gliwice	30	15	8	7	47	31	+16	53	Qualification for the Championship round
4	Cracovia	30	14	6	10	39	34	+5	48	Qualification for the Championship round
5	Zagłębie Lubin	30	14	5	11	48	38	+10	47 (Note: Head-to-head record: Zagłębie Lubin 0–2 Jagiellonia Białystok, Jagiellonia Białystok 0–4 Zagłębie Lubin.)	Qualification for the Championship round
6	Jagiellonia Białystok	30	13	8	9	45	41	+4	47	Qualification for the Championship round
7	Pogoń Szczecin	30	12	7	11	44	42	+2	43 (Note: Head-to-head record: Pogoń Szczecin 3–0 Lech Poznań, Lech Poznań 3–2 Pogoń Szczecin.)	Qualification for the Championship round
8	Lech Poznań	30	13	4	13	41	40	+1	43	Qualification for the Championship round
9	Wisła Kraków	30	12	6	12	55	48	+7	42	Qualification for the Relegation round
10	Korona Kielce	30	10	10	10	35	44	−9	40	Qualification for the Relegation round
11	Miedź Legnica	30	8	8	14	30	52	−22	32	Qualification for the Relegation round
12	Górnik Zabrze	30	7	10	13	36	49	−13	31 (Note: Head-to-head record: Górnik Zabrze 2–2 Śląsk Wrocław, Śląsk Wrocław 0–1 Górnik Zabrze.)	Qualification for the Relegation round
13	Śląsk Wrocław	30	8	7	15	35	37	−2	31	Qualification for the Relegation round
14	Wisła Płock	30	7	9	14	40	49	−9	30	Qualification for the Relegation round
15	Arka Gdynia	30	6	11	13	39	44	−5	29	Qualification for the Relegation round
16	Zagłębie Sosnowiec	30	6	6	18	41	63	−22	24	Qualification for the Relegation round

Source: Ekstraklasa, 90minut
Rules for classification: 1) Points; 2) Head-to-head points; 3) Head-to-head goal difference; 4) Head-to-head goals scored; 5) Head-to-head away goals scored (only if two teams); 6) Goal difference; 7) Goals scored; 8) Fairplay ranking; 9) Draw. (Note: Head-to-head record is used only after all the matches between the teams in question have been played.)

==== Championship round ====
Pos	Team	Pld	W	D	L	GF	GA	GD	Pts	Qualification
1	Piast Gliwice (C)	37	21	9	7	57	33	+24	72	Qualification for the Champions League first qualifying round
2	Legia Warsaw	37	20	8	9	55	38	+17	68	Qualification for the Europa League first qualifying round
3	Lechia Gdańsk	37	19	10	8	54	38	+16	67	Qualification for the Europa League second qualifying round (Note: Lechia Gdańsk qualified for the Europa League second qualifying round by winning the 2018–19 Polish Cup.)
4	Cracovia	37	17	6	14	45	43	+2	57 (Note: Points in regular season: Cracovia 48 points, Jagiellonia Białystok 47 points.)	Qualification for the Europa League first qualifying round
5	Jagiellonia Białystok	37	16	9	12	55	52	+3	57	
6	Zagłębie Lubin	37	15	8	14	57	48	+9	53	
7	Pogoń Szczecin	37	14	10	13	57	54	+3	52 (Note: Head-to-head in regular season record: Pogoń Szczecin 3–0 Lech Poznań, Lech Poznań 3–2 Pogoń Szczecin.)	
8	Lech Poznań	37	15	7	15	49	48	+1	52	

Source: Ekstraklasa, 90minut
Rules for classification: 1) Points; 2) Points in regular season; 3) Head-to-head points in regular season; 4) Head-to-head goal difference in regular season; 5) Head-to-head goals scored in regular season; 5) Head-to-head away goals scored in regular season (if only two teams); 7) Goal difference; 8) Goals scored; 9) Fairplay ranking; 10) Play-off (only if needed to decide champion, teams for relegation or teams for UEFA competitions).
(C) Champions

==== Relegation round ====
Pos	Team	Pld	W	D	L	GF	GA	GD	Pts	Qualification
9	Wisła Kraków	37	14	7	16	67	63	+4	49	
10	Korona Kielce	37	12	11	14	42	54	−12	47	
11	Górnik Zabrze	37	12	10	15	48	53	−5	46	
12	Śląsk Wrocław	37	12	8	17	49	45	+4	44	
13	Arka Gdynia	37	10	12	15	49	51	−2	42	
14	Wisła Płock	37	10	11	16	50	58	−8	41	
15	Miedź Legnica (R)	37	10	10	17	40	65	−25	40	Relegation to I liga
16	Zagłębie Sosnowiec (R)	37	7	8	22	49	80	−31	29	Relegation to I liga

Source: Ekstraklasa, 90minut
Rules for classification: 1) Points; 2) Points in regular season; 3) Head-to-head points in regular season; 4) Head-to-head goal difference in regular season; 5) Head-to-head goals scored in regular season; 5) Head-to-head away goals scored in regular season (if only two teams); 7) Goal difference; 8) Goals scored; 9) Fairplay ranking; 10) Play-off (only if needed to decide champion, teams for relegation or teams for UEFA competitions).
(R) Relegated

=== I liga ===
==== Regular season ====
Pos	Team	Pld	W	D	L	GF	GA	GD	Pts	Promotion or Relegation
1	Raków Częstochowa (C, P)	34	20	10	4	54	22	+32	70	Promotion to Ekstraklasa
2	ŁKS Łódź (P)	34	20	9	5	58	23	+35	69	Promotion to Ekstraklasa
3	Stal Mielec	34	18	10	6	59	28	+31	64	
4	Sandecja Nowy Sącz	34	14	13	7	35	29	+6	55	
5	GKS Jastrzębie	34	12	12	10	43	38	+5	48 (Note: Head-to-head record: GKS Jastrzębie 2–1 Podbeskidzie, Podbeskidzie 2–2 GKS Jastrzębie.)	
6	Podbeskidzie Bielsko-Biała	34	13	9	12	52	46	+6	48	
7	GKS Tychy	34	12	11	11	48	41	+7	47	
8	Bruk-Bet Termalica Nieciecza	34	12	10	12	45	46	−1	46	
9	Puszcza Niepołomice	34	12	8	14	37	45	−8	44	
10	Chojniczanka Chojnice	34	10	12	12	49	49	0	42	
11	Stomil Olsztyn (Note: Stomil Olsztyn were deducted 3 points for financial arrears.)	34	11	10	13	38	43	−5	40 (Note: Head-to-head record: Stomil 2–1 Odra, Odra 2–2 Stomil.)	
12	Odra Opole	34	10	10	14	47	58	−11	40	
13	Warta Poznań	34	10	9	15	31	43	−12	39 (Note: Head-to-head record: Warta 2–1 Chrobry, Chrobry 1–1 Warta.)	
14	Chrobry Głogów	34	10	9	15	29	39	−10	39	
15	Wigry Suwałki	34	9	10	15	40	56	−16	37 (Note: Head-to-head record: Wigry - 7 points, Bytovia - 5 points, GKS Katowice - 4 points.)	
16	Bytovia Bytów (R)	34	7	16	11	45	50	−5	37	Relegation to 2019–20 II liga
17	GKS Katowice (R)	34	9	10	15	34	45	−11	37	Relegation to 2019–20 II liga
18	Garbarnia Kraków (R)	34	5	6	23	21	64	−43	21	Relegation to 2019–20 II liga

Source: 1 liga, 90minut
Rules for classification: 1. points won; 2. points in head-to-head matches; 3. goal difference in hth matches; 4. goals scored in hth matches; 5. away goals in hth matches (only if two teams are tied); 6. total goal difference; 7. total goals scored; 8. fairplay ranking.
(C) Champions; (P) Promoted; (R) Relegated

== Polish Cup ==
2 May 2019 Polish Cup Final	Jagiellonia Białystok	0–1	Lechia Gdańsk	PGE Narodowy, Warsaw
16:00 CEST (UTC+2)		90minut	Sobiech 90+6'	Attendance: 44,158; Referee: Bartosz Frankowski (Toruń)

== Polish Super Cup ==
14 July 2018 2018 Polish Super Cup	Legia Warsaw	2–3	Arka Gdynia	Polish Army Stadium, Warsaw
20:30 CEST	Bodanov 2' (o.g.); Kanté (yellow card) 27'; Philipps 30' (yellow card) 53'; Mączyński (yellow card) 43'; Vešović (yellow card) 44'; Carlitos (yellow card) 61'; Szymański (yellow card) 62'; Kucharczyk (yellow card) 90+2'	PZPN; 90minut	Zarandia 20'; Marić (yellow card) 31'; Bodanov 38'; Janota 45+3'; Nalepa (yellow card) 79'	Attendance: 17,419; Referee: Mariusz Złotek (Stalowa Wola)

== Polish clubs in Europe ==
=== Legia Warsaw ===
2018–19 UEFA Champions League

==== Qualifying phase ====
10 July 2018 1st QR	Cork City (Republic of Ireland)	0–1	(Poland) Legia Warsaw	Turners Cross, Cork
20:45 CEST (UTC+2)		Report	Kucharczyk 79'	Attendance: 5,795; Referee: Radu Petrescu (Romania)

17 July 2018 1st QR	Legia Warsaw (Poland)	3–0 (4–0 agg.)	(Republic of Ireland) Cork City	Polish Army Stadium, Warsaw
21:00 CEST (UTC+2)	Kanté 28'; Radović 73' (pen.); Carlitos 89'	Report		Attendance: 14,576; Referee: Kai Erik Steen (Norway)

24 July 2018 2nd QR	Legia Warsaw (Poland)	0–2	(Slovakia) Spartak Trnava	Polish Army Stadium, Warsaw
21:00 CEST (UTC+2)		Report	Grendel 16'; Vlasko 90+3'	Attendance: 15,527; Referee: Ádám Farkas (Hungary)

31 July 2018 2nd QR	Spartak Trnava (Slovakia)	0–1 (2–1 agg.)	(Poland) Legia Warsaw	Štadión Antona Malatinského, Trnava
20:30 CEST (UTC+2)		Report	Astiz 63'	Attendance: 17,204; Referee: Roi Reinshreiber (Israel)

2018–19 UEFA Europa League

==== Qualifying phase ====
9 August 2018 3rd QR	Legia Warsaw (Poland)	1–2	(Luxembourg) F91 Dudelange	Polish Army Stadium, Warsaw
21:00 CEST (UTC+2)	Carlitos 27'	Report	Couturier 24'; Turpel 62' (pen.)	Attendance: 9,923; Referee: Halis Özkahya (Turkey)

16 August 2018 3rd QR	F91 Dudelange (Luxembourg)	2–2 (4–3 agg.)	(Poland) Legia Warsaw	Stade Josy Barthel, Luxembourg City (Note: F91 Dudelange played their third qualifying and play-off rounds home matches at Stade Josy Barthel, Luxembourg City, instead of their regular stadium Stade Jos Nosbaum, Dudelange.)
20:00 CEST (UTC+2)	Stumpf 7'; Stélvio 17'	Report	Kanté 33', 86'	Attendance: 2,000; Referee: Ivaylo Stoyanov (Bulgaria)

=== Jagiellonia Białystok ===
2018–19 UEFA Europa League

==== Qualifying phase ====
26 July 2018 2nd QR	Jagiellonia Białystok (Poland)	1–0	(Portugal) Rio Ave	Białystok City Stadium, Białystok
19:20 CEST (UTC+2)	Machaj 9'	Report		Attendance: 13,725; Referee: Ricardo de Burgos Bengoetxea (Spain)

2 August 2018 2nd QR	Rio Ave (Portugal)	4–4 (4–5 agg.)	(Poland) Jagiellonia Białystok	Estádio dos Arcos, Vila do Conde
21:00 CEST (UTC+2)	Galeno 27', 45+2'; Gelson 63'; Furtado 84'	Report	Sheridan 6'; Romanczuk 56', 79'; Pospíšil 72'	Attendance: 5,930; Referee: Marco Di Bello (Italy)

9 August 2018 3rd QR	Jagiellonia Białystok (Poland)	0–1	(Belgium) Gent	Białystok City Stadium, Białystok
19:20 CEST (UTC+2)		Report	Jonathan David 85'	Attendance: 15,591; Referee: Ali Palabıyık (Turkey)

16 August 2018 3rd QR	Gent (Belgium)	3–1 (4–1 agg.)	(Poland) Jagiellonia Białystok	Ghelamco Arena, Ghent
20:30 CEST (UTC+2)	Awoniyi 13'; Yaremchuk 84'; Jonathan David 89'	Report	Pospíšil 58'	Attendance: 16,000; Referee: Bastian Dankert (Germany)

=== Lech Poznań ===
2018–19 UEFA Europa League

==== Qualifying phase ====
12 July 2018 1st QR	Lech Poznań (Poland)	2–0	(Armenia) Gandzasar Kapan	Stadion Miejski, Poznań
20:45 CEST (UTC+2)	Gytkjær 10', 15' (pen.)	Report		Attendance: 0 (No-crowd match); Referee: Yigal Frid (Israel)

19 July 2018 1st QR	Gandzasar Kapan (Armenia)	2–1 (2–3 agg.)	(Poland) Lech Poznań	Vazgen Sargsyan Republican Stadium, Yerevan (Note: Gandzasar Kapan played their home match at Vazgen Sargsyan Republican Stadium, Yerevan, instead of their regular stadium Gandzasar Stadium, Kapan, due to renovation.)
17:00 CEST (UTC+2)	Musonda 50'; Harutyunyan 67'	Report	Trałka 90+5'	Attendance: 1,645; Referee: Mohammed Al-Hakim (Sweden)

26 July 2018 2nd QR	Shakhtyor Soligorsk (Belarus)	1–1	(Poland) Lech Poznań	Stroitel Stadium, Salihorsk
19:30 CEST (UTC+2)	Bakaj 53'	Report	Amaral 89'	Attendance: 3,700; Referee: Svein Oddvar Moen (Norway)

2 August 2018 2nd QR	Lech Poznań (Poland)	3–1 (a.e.t.) (4–2 agg.)	(Belarus) Shakhtyor Soligorsk	Stadion Miejski, Poznań
20:45 CEST (UTC+2)	Gytkjær 15', 94', 118'	Report	Laptsew 79'	Attendance: 16,507; Referee: Christian Dingert (Germany)

9 August 2018 3rd QR	Genk (Belgium)	2–0	(Poland) Lech Poznań	Luminus Arena, Genk
20:00 CEST (UTC+2)	Malinovskyi 44'; Samatta 56'	Report		Attendance: 13,540; Referee: Marius Avram (Romania)

16 August 2018 3rd QR	Lech Poznań (Poland)	1–2 (1–4 agg.)	(Belgium) Genk	Stadion Miejski, Poznań
20:15 CEST (UTC+2)	Cywka 50'	Report	Samatta 19'; Trossard 45+1' (pen.)	Attendance: 20,765; Referee: Marco Guida (Italy)

=== Górnik Zabrze ===
2018–19 UEFA Europa League

==== Qualifying phase ====
12 July 2018 1st QR	Górnik Zabrze (Poland)	1–0	(Moldova) Zaria Bǎlți	Ernest Pohl Stadium, Zabrze
20:00 CEST (UTC+2)	Angulo 87'	Report		Attendance: 19,528; Referee: Filip Glova (Slovakia)

19 July 2018 1st QR	Zaria Bǎlți (Moldova)	1–1 (1–2 agg.)	(Poland) Górnik Zabrze	Zimbru Stadium, Chișinău (Note: Zaria Bǎlți played their home match at Zimbru Stadium, Chișinău, instead of their regular stadium Stadionul Orășenesc, Bălți.)
19:00 CEST (UTC+2)	Silva 7'	Report	Smuga 85'	Attendance: 1,300; Referee: Rahim Hasanov (Azerbaijan)

26 July 2018 2nd QR	Górnik Zabrze (Poland)	0–1	(Slovakia) Trenčín	Ernest Pohl Stadium, Zabrze
20:00 CEST (UTC+2)		Report	Azango 39'	Attendance: 12,859; Referee: Mattias Gestranius (Finland)

2 August 2018 2nd QR	Trenčín (Slovakia)	4–1 (5–1 agg.)	(Poland) Górnik Zabrze	Stadium Myjava, Myjava (Note: Trenčín played home match at Stadium Myjava, Myjava instead of their regular stadium Štadión na Sihoti, Trenčín, due to renovation.)
17:30 CEST (UTC+2)	Angulo 10' (o.g.); Čataković 20', 90'; Azango 59'	Report	Smuga 60'	Attendance: 1,897; Referee: Ole Hobber Nilsen (Norway)

== National teams ==
=== Poland national team ===
==== 2018–19 UEFA Nations League ====
Pos	Team	Pld	W	D	L	GF	GA	GD	Pts	Qualification (Note: Due to revamp of the format for the 2020–21 UEFA Nations League, no teams were eventually relegated.)	(Portugal)	(Italy)	(Poland)
1	Portugal	4	2	2	0	5	3	+2	8	Qualification for Nations League Finals	—	1–0	1–1
2	Italy	4	1	2	1	2	2	0	5		0–0	—	1–1
3	Poland	4	0	2	2	4	6	−2	2		2–3	0–1	—

Source: UEFA
Notes:

7 September 2018 2018–19 UEFA Nations League	Italy	1–1	Poland	Bologna, Italy
20:45 (UTC+2)	Jorginho 78' (pen.)	Report	Zieliński 40'	Stadium: Stadio Renato Dall'Ara; Referee: Felix Zwayer (Germany)

11 October 2018 2018–19 UEFA Nations League	Poland	2–3	Portugal	Chorzów, Poland
20:45 (UTC+2)	Piątek 18'; Błaszczykowski 77'	Report	A. Silva 32'; Glik 43' (o.g.); B. Silva 52'	Stadium: Stadion Śląski; Referee: Carlos del Cerro Grande (Spain)

14 October 2018 2018–19 UEFA Nations League	Poland	0–1	Italy	Chorzów, Poland
20:45 (UTC+2)		Report	Biraghi 90+2'	Stadium: Stadion Śląski; Referee: Damir Skomina (Slovenia)

20 November 2018 2018–19 UEFA Nations League	Portugal	1–1	Poland	Guimarães, Portugal
19:45 (UTC±0)	A. Silva 34'	Report	Milik 66' (pen.)	Stadium: Estádio D. Afonso Henriques; Referee: Sergei Karasev (Russia)

==== Friendlies ====
11 September 2018 Friendly	Poland	1–1	Republic of Ireland	Wrocław, Poland
20:45 (UTC+2)	Klich 87'	Report	O'Brien 53'	Stadium: Stadion Miejski; Referee: Boris Marhefka (Slovakia)

15 November 2018 Friendly	Poland	0–1	Czech Republic	Gdańsk, Poland
20:45 (UTC+1)		Report	Jankto 52'	Stadium: Stadion Energa; Attendance: 34,783; Referee: Stephan Klossner (Switzerland)

==== UEFA Euro 2020 qualifying ====
Pos	Team	Pld	W	D	L	GF	GA	GD	Pts	Qualification	(Poland)	(Austria)	(North Macedonia)	(Slovenia)	(Israel)	(Latvia)
1	Poland	10	8	1	1	18	5	+13	25	Qualify for final tournament	—	0–0	2–0	3–2	4–0	2–0
2	Austria	10	6	1	3	19	9	+10	19	Qualify for final tournament	0–1	—	2–1	1–0	3–1	6–0
3	North Macedonia	10	4	2	4	12	13	−1	14 (Note: Head-to-head points: North Macedonia 4, Slovenia 1.)	Advance to play-offs via Nations League	0–1	1–4	—	2–1	1–0	3–1
4	Slovenia	10	4	2	4	16	11	+5	14		2–0	0–1	1–1	—	3–2	1–0
5	Israel	10	3	2	5	16	18	−2	11	Advance to play-offs via Nations League	1–2	4–2	1–1	1–1	—	3–1
6	Latvia	10	1	0	9	3	28	−25	3		0–3	1–0	0–2	0–5	0–3	—

Source: UEFA
Rules for classification: Qualification tiebreakers
Notes:

21 March 2019 UEFA Euro 2020 qualifying	Austria	0–1	Poland	Vienna, Austria
20:45 (UTC+1)		Report	Piątek 69'	Stadium: Ernst-Happel-Stadion; Referee: Anastasios Sidiropoulos (Greece)

24 March 2019 UEFA Euro 2020 qualifying	Poland	2–0	Latvia	Warsaw, Poland
20:45 (UTC+1)	Lewandowski 76'; Glik 84'	Report		Stadium: National Stadium; Referee: Aliyar Aghayev (Azerbaijan)

7 June 2019 UEFA Euro 2020 qualifying	North Macedonia	0–1	Poland	Skopje, North Macedonia
20:45 (UTC+2)		Report	Piątek 47'	Stadium: Toše Proeski Arena; Referee: Gianluca Rocchi (Italy)

10 June 2019 UEFA Euro 2020 qualifying	Poland	4–0	Israel	Warsaw, Poland
20:45 (UTC+2)	Piątek 35'; Lewandowski 56' (pen.); Grosicki 59'; Kądzior 84'	Report		Stadium: National Stadium; Attendance: 57,229; Referee: Tobias Stieler (Germany)

=== Poland national under-21 team ===
==== 2019 UEFA European Under-21 Championship qualification ====
Pos	Team	Pld	W	D	L	GF	GA	GD	Pts	Qualification	Denmark	Poland	Georgia	Finland	Lithuania	Faroe Islands
1	Denmark	10	7	2	1	30	8	+22	23	Final tournament	—	1–1	5–2	2–0	6–0	3–0
2	Poland	10	6	4	0	22	9	+13	22	Play-offs	3–1	—	3–0	3–3	1–0	1–1
3	Georgia	10	3	3	4	11	19	−8	12		2–2	0–3	—	2–2	1–0	1–0
4	Finland	10	2	3	5	13	21	−8	9		0–5	1–3	1–2	—	0–2	1–1
5	Lithuania	10	2	2	6	7	16	−9	8		0–2	0–2	0–0	0–2	—	3–0
6	Faroe Islands	10	1	4	5	10	20	−10	7		0–3	2–2	3–1	1–3	2–2	—

Source: UEFA

7 September 2018 UEFA EURO U-21 qualification	Poland	1–1	Faroe Islands	Lubin, Poland
18:00 CEST (UTC+02:00)	Kownacki 72' (pen.)	Report	Thomsen 16'	Stadium: Stadion Zaglebia Lubin; Referee: Robert Hennessy (Republic of Ireland)

11 September 2018 UEFA EURO U-21 qualification	Finland	1–3	Poland	Helsinki, Finland
17:30 CEST (UTC+02:00)	Lappalainen 68'	Report	Wieteska 66', 74'; Kownacki 89' (pen.)	Stadium: Telia 5G -areena Referee: Stephan Klossner (Switzerland)

12 October 2018 UEFA EURO U-21 qualification	Denmark	1–1	Poland	Aalborg, Denmark
18:00 CEST (UTC+02:00)	Billing 40'	Report	Kownacki 43' (pen.)	Stadium: Aalborg Stadium; Referee: Mete Kalkavan (Turkey)

16 October 2018 UEFA EURO U-21 qualification	Poland	3–0	Georgia	Gdynia, Poland
18:00 CEST (UTC+02:00)	Mikeltadze 52' (o.g.); Michalak 74'; Kownacki 90'	Report		Stadium: Stadion GOSiR; Referee: Arnold Hunter (Northern Ireland)

16 November 2018 UEFA EURO U-21 qualification play-offs	Poland	0–1	Portugal	Zabrze, Poland
18:00 CET (UTC+01:00)		Report	Jota 30'	Stadium: Ernest Pohl Stadium; Attendance: 12,982; Referee: Georgi Kabakov (Bulgaria)

20 November 2018 UEFA EURO U-21 qualification play-offs	Portugal	1–3 (2–3 agg.)	Poland	Chaves, Portugal
18:00 CET (UTC+01:00)	Jota 52'	Report	Bielik 5'; Kownacki 8'; Szymański 24'	Stadium: Estádio Municipal Eng. Manuel Branco Teixeira; Attendance: 6,000; Referee: Davide Massa (Italy)

==== Friendlies ====
21 March 2019 Friendly	England	1–1	Poland	Bristol, England
20:45 CET (UTC+01:00)	Calvert-Lewin 13'	PZPN; 90minut	Szymański 34'	Stadium: Ashton Gate Stadium; Attendance: 25,119; Referee: Lawrence Visser (Belgium)

26 March 2019 Friendly	Poland	0–2	Serbia	Grodzisk Wielkopolski, Poland
15:00 CET (UTC+01:00)		PZPN; 90minut	Mašović 71'; Ranđelović 87'	Stadium: Dyskobolia Stadium; Referee: Tomasz Wajda (Poland)

==== 2019 UEFA European Under-21 Championship ====
Pos	Team	Pld	W	D	L	GF	GA	GD	Pts	Qualification
1	Spain	3	2	0	1	8	4	+4	6 (Note: Head-to-head goal difference: Spain +3, Italy +1, Poland –4.)	Knockout stage and 2020 Summer Olympics
2	Italy (H)	3	2	0	1	6	3	+3	6	
3	Poland	3	2	0	1	4	7	−3	6	
4	Belgium	3	0	0	3	4	8	−4	0	

Source: UEFA
Rules for classification: Group stage tiebreakers
(H) Hosts
Notes:

16 June 2019 UEFA EURO U-21	Poland	3–2	Belgium	Reggio Emilia, Italy
18:30 CEST (UTC+02:00)	Żurkowski 26'; Bielik 52'; Szymański 79'	Report	Leya Iseka 16'; Cools 84'	Stadium: Mapei Stadium – Città del Tricolore; Attendance: 2,534; Referee: István Kovács (Romania)

19 June 2019 UEFA EURO U-21	Italy	0–1	Poland	Bologna, Italy
21:00 CEST (UTC+02:00)		Report	Bielik 40'	Stadium: Stadio Renato Dall'Ara; Attendance: 26,890; Referee: Aleksei Kulbakov (Belarus)

22 June 2019 UEFA EURO U-21	Spain	5–0	Poland	Bologna, Italy
21:00 CEST (UTC+02:00)	Fornals 17'; Oyarzabal 35'; Fabián 39'; Ceballos 71'; Mayoral 90'	Report		Stadium: Stadio Renato Dall'Ara; Attendance: 3,122; Referee: Bobby Madden (Scotland)
