= Michał Nalepa =

Michał Nalepa may refer to:

- Michał Nalepa (footballer, born 1993), Polish footballer playing for Zagłębie Lubin
- Michał Nalepa (footballer, born 1995), Polish footballer playing for Gençlerbirliği
