= Liszka =

Liszka is a Polish surname derived from a nickname with multiple meanings. In particular, it may mean 'vixen', a nickname for a cunning or treacherous person. It has archaic feminine forms, still in colloquial use: Liszczyna or Liszkowa (after husband); Liszczanka (after father). Notable people with the surname include:

- Daniel Liszka (born 2000), Polish footballer
- James Jakob Liszka
- Wilhelm Lawicz-Liszka (1893–1968), Polish infantry officer
- Wojciech Liszka (born 1980), Polish basketball referee
