= Matthew Guillaumier =

Maltese footballer

Personal information
- Date of birth: 9 April 1998 (age 28)
- Place of birth: Sliema, Malta
- Height: 1.83 m (6 ft 0 in)
- Position: Midfielder

Team information
- Current team: Ħamrun Spartans
- Number: 6

Youth career
- –2013: St. Andrews
- 2013–2015: Empoli

Senior career*
Years	Team	Apps	(Gls)
2013	St. Andrews	1	(0)
2015–2016	St. Andrews	16	(0)
2016–2020	Birkirkara	75	(5)
2020–2023	Ħamrun Spartans	55	(6)
2022	→ Siena (loan)	12	(0)
2023–2025	Stal Mielec	64	(5)
2025–2026	Panserraikos	8	(0)
2026–	Ħamrun Spartans	18	(3)

International career^{‡}
2014	Malta U17	6	(0)
2014–2016	Malta U19	9	(2)
2015–2018	Malta U21	15	(1)
2019–	Malta	60	(3)
- * Club domestic league appearances and goals as of 20:46, 5 June 2026 (UTC) ‡ National team caps and goals as of 19:50, 18 November 2026 (UTC)

Matthew Guillaumier (Maltese pronunciation: [ˈɡʊlːɐjmɪːr]; born 9 April 1998) is a Maltese professional footballer who plays as a midfielder for Maltese Premier League club Ħamrun Spartans and the Malta national team.

== Club career ==
Guillaumier began his youth career with St. Andrews at the age of five. On 26 April 2013, he made his debut for the senior team in a First Division match against Gudja United, aged only 15 years and 17 days. In the match he played alongside his uncle, midfielder Joseph Farrugia. In September 2013, after trials with English clubs Birmingham City and West Bromwich Albion, he joined the youth academy of Italian club Empoli, with whom he had trained regularly in the year prior.

In 2015, he returned to St. Andrews, making sixteen appearances in the Maltese Premier League. In January 2016, he moved to Birkirkara on a 4.5-year contract, lasting until 2020. On the 29 September 2020 he moved to Ħamrun Spartans for a record fee in Malta of €300,000. In the same season, after winning his first Maltese Premier League title, he received the award as Maltese Player of the Year.

On 31 January 2022, Guillaumier joined Siena in the Italian third-tier Serie C on loan with an option to buy.

On 13 July 2023, Polish Ekstraklasa side Stal Mielec announced the signing of Guillaumier on a two-year deal, with an option for another season.

On 20 June 2025, Guillaumier signed a two-year contract with Greek club Panserraikos.

On 5 January 2026, Guillaumier joined Ħamrun Spartans for the second time in his career on a six-month contract, reportedly worth €10,000 a month.

== International career ==
Guillaumier was included in the squad of hosts Malta for the 2014 UEFA European Under-17 Championship. He appeared in all three matches, with the team eliminated in the group stage. He made his international debut for Malta on 23 March 2019, starting in a UEFA Euro 2020 qualifying home match against the Faroe Islands, which finished as a 2–1 home win. The match was Malta's first competitive home win, as well as their first UEFA European Championship qualifying win, since October 2006.

== Career statistics ==
=== Club ===
As of match played 15 May 2026

Appearances and goals by club, season and competition
Club	Season	League			National cup (Note: Includes Maltese FA Trophy, Polish Cup)		Continental		Total	
Club	Season	Division	Apps	Goals	Apps	Goals	Apps	Goals	Apps	Goals
St. Andrews	2013–14	Maltese First Division	0	0	1	0	—		1	0
St. Andrews	2015–16	Maltese Premier League	16	0	—		—		16	0
St. Andrews	Total		16	0	1	0	0	0	17	0
Birkirkara	2015–16	Maltese Premier League	12	0	2	0	—		14	0
Birkirkara	2016–17	Maltese Premier League	21	1	—		5 (Note: Appearance(s) in UEFA Europa League)	0	26	1
Birkirkara	2017–18	Maltese Premier League	11	2	—		—		11	2
Birkirkara	2018–19	Maltese Premier League	16	1	2	0	—		18	1
Birkirkara	2019–20	Maltese Premier League	13	1	2	1	—		15	2
Birkirkara	2020–21	Maltese Premier League	2	0	—		—		2	0
Birkirkara	Total		75	5	6	1	5	0	86	6
Ħamrun Spartans	2020–21	Maltese Premier League	19	1	2	0	—		21	1
Ħamrun Spartans	2021–22	Maltese Premier League	11	1	—		—		11	1
Ħamrun Spartans	2022–23	Maltese Premier League	25	4	3	1	8 (Note: Appearance(s) in UEFA Europa Conference League)	4	36	9
Ħamrun Spartans	Total		55	6	3	1	8	4	68	11
Siena (loan)	2021–22	Serie C	12	0	—		—		12	0
Stal Mielec	2023–24	Ekstraklasa	33	2	3	0	—		36	2
Stal Mielec	2024–25	Ekstraklasa	31	3	0	0	—		31	3
Stal Mielec	Total		64	5	3	0	—		67	5
Panserraikos	2025–26	Super League Greece	8	0	0	0	—		8	0
Ħamrun Spartans	2025–26	Maltese Premier League	18	3	1	0	—		19	3
Career total			248	19	13	2	18	4	279	25

=== International ===
As of match played 16 November 2026

Appearances and goals by national team and year
National team	Year	Apps	Goals
Malta	2019	2	0
Malta	2020	6	1
Malta	2021	5	0
Malta	2022	10	1
Malta	2023	10	0
Malta	2024	9	1
Malta	2025	9	0
Malta	2026	9	0
Total		60	3

Scores and results list Malta's goal tally first, score column indicates score after each Guillaumier goal.

List of international goals scored by Matthew Guillaumier
No.	Date	Venue	Opponent	Score	Result	Competition
1	17 November 2020	National Stadium, Ta' Qali, Malta	Faroe Islands	1–0	1–1	2020–21 UEFA Nations League
2	5 June 2022	San Marino Stadium, Serravalle, San Marino	San Marino	2–0	2–0	2022–23 UEFA Nations League
3	21 March 2024	National Stadium, Ta' Qali, Malta	Slovenia	1–1	2–2	Friendly

== Honours ==
Ħamrun Spartans

- Maltese Premier League: 2020–21, 2022–23

Individual

- Maltese Player of the Year: 2020–21
