= Paweł Bochniewicz =

Polish footballer (born 1996)

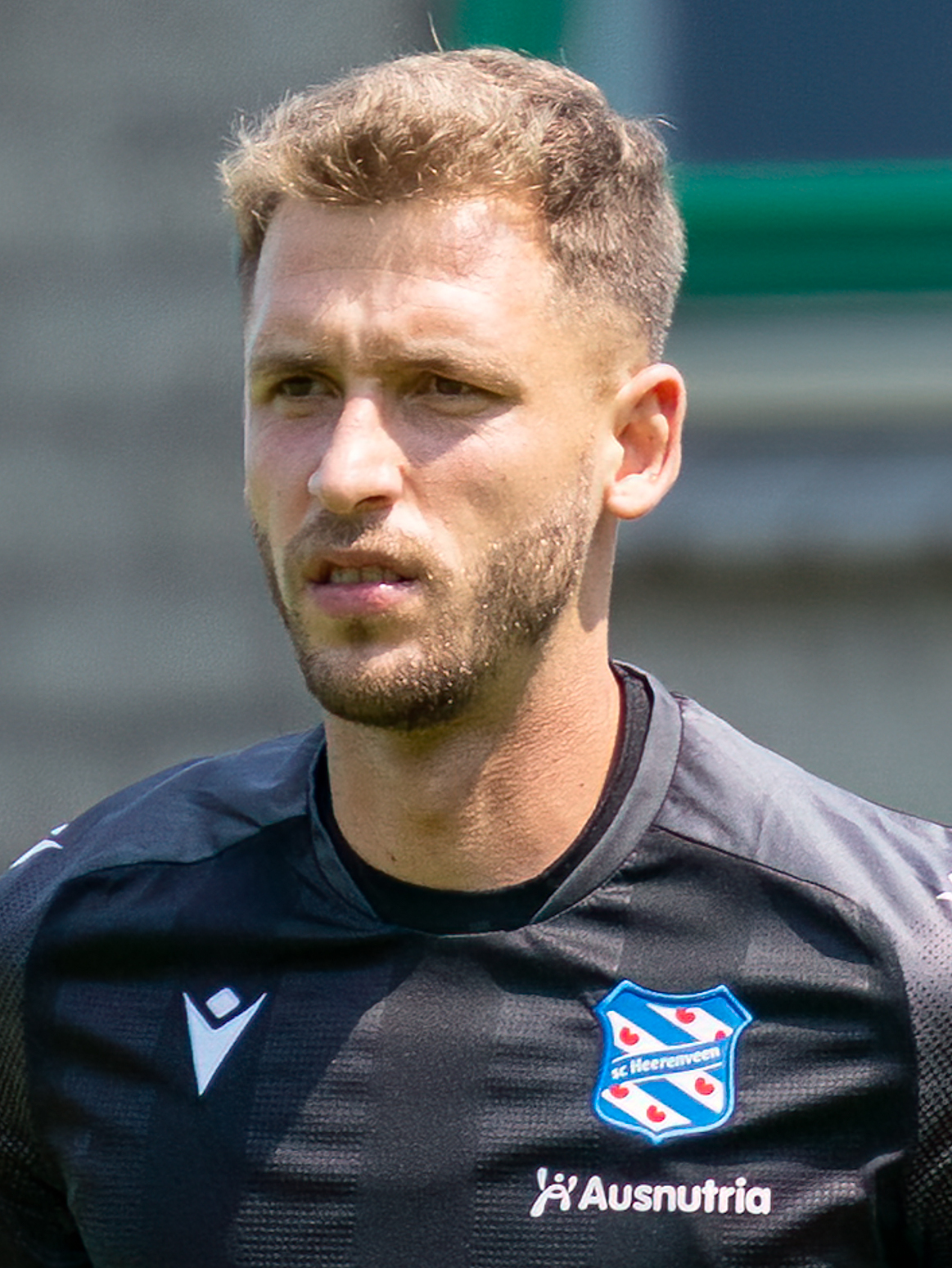
- Bochniewicz with Heerenveen in 2023

Personal information
- Date of birth: 30 January 1996 (age 30)
- Place of birth: Dębica, Poland
- Height: 1.94 m (6 ft 4 in)
- Position: Centre-back

Team information
- Current team: Górnik Zabrze
- Number: 4

Youth career
- Wisłoka Dębica
- 2010–2012: Stal Mielec
- 2012–2014: Reggina

Senior career*
Years	Team	Apps	(Gls)
2013–2014	Reggina	11	(0)
2014–2019	Udinese	0	(0)
2015–2017	→ Granada B (loan)	46	(4)
2018–2019	→ Górnik Zabrze (loan)	48	(2)
2019–2020	Górnik Zabrze	35	(2)
2020–2026	Heerenveen	107	(7)
2026–	Górnik Zabrze	10	(1)

International career
2012	Poland U16	1	(0)
2012–2013	Poland U17	11	(0)
2013–2014	Poland U18	3	(1)
2013–2015	Poland U19	7	(0)
2015–2017	Poland U20	7	(1)
2016–2017	Poland U21	13	(0)
2020–2023	Poland	3	(0)
- * Club domestic league appearances and goals as of 20:46, 28 August 2026 (UTC)

Paweł Bochniewicz (born 30 January 1996) is a Polish professional footballer who plays as a centre-back for Ekstraklasa club Górnik Zabrze.

== Club career ==
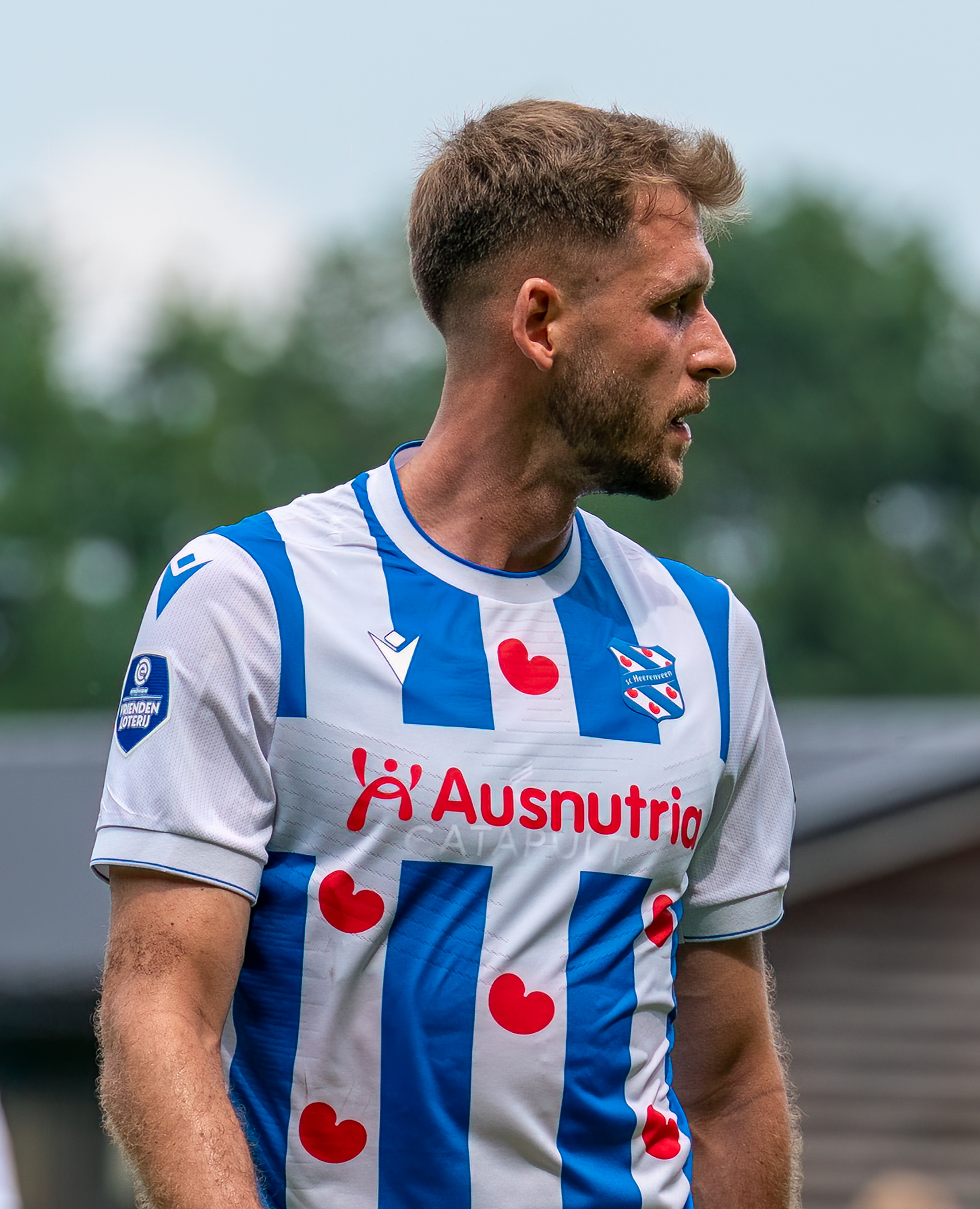
Bochniewicz with Heerenveen during a friendly match in 2023

Bochniewicz started his career in his hometown club, Wisłoka Dębica. In 2010, he joined the youth team of Stal Mielec. Two years later, his talent was spotted by Reggina Calcio scouts and he moved to Italy. On 22 March 2014, he made his senior debut in Serie B, coming on as a substitute in the 66th minute against Empoli.

On 6 June 2014, he joined Serie A club Udinese. On 20 January 2018, Bochniewicz joined Ekstraklasa club Górnik Zabrze on loan, later signing for them permanently in July 2019. On 10 September 2020, he joined Eredivisie club Heerenveen on a three-year contract. He started in the first match of the season on 12 September 2020 against Willem II, in which he also scored in a 2–0 victory.

On 24 January 2026, Bochniewicz returned to Górnik Zabrze on a three-and-a-half-year deal.

== International career ==
On 7 October 2020, Bochniewicz made his international debut in friendly match against Finland and was replaced by Sebastian Walukiewicz.

On 29 May 2024, he was named in coach Michał Probierz's 29-man preliminary squad for UEFA Euro 2024, but was not included in the final roster.

== Career statistics ==
=== Club ===
As of match played 27 August 2026

Appearances and goals by club, season and competition
Club	Season	League			National cup (Note: Includes Coppa Italia, Polish Cup, KNVB Cup)		Europe		Other		Total	
Club	Season	Division	Apps	Goals	Apps	Goals	Apps	Goals	Apps	Goals	Apps	Goals
Reggina	2013–14	Serie B	11	0	0	0	—		—		11	0
Udinese	2014–15	Serie A	0	0	0	0	—		—		0	0
Udinese	2017–18	Serie A	0	0	2	0	—		—		2	0
Udinese	Total		0	0	2	0	—		—		2	0
Granada B (loan)	2015–16	Segunda División B	20	2	—		—		—		20	2
Granada B (loan)	2016–17	Segunda División B	26	2	—		—		—		26	2
Granada B (loan)	Total		46	4	—		—		—		46	4
Górnik Zabrze (loan)	2017–18	Ekstraklasa	16	1	2	0	—		—		18	2
Górnik Zabrze (loan)	2018–19	Ekstraklasa	32	1	4	0	—		—		36	1
Górnik Zabrze	2019–20	Ekstraklasa	33	1	2	0	—		—		35	1
Górnik Zabrze	2020–21	Ekstraklasa	2	1	1	1	—		—		3	2
Górnik Zabrze	Total		83	4	9	1	—		—		92	5
Heerenveen	2020–21	Eredivisie	31	2	4	0	—		—		27	0
Heerenveen	2021–22	Eredivisie	0	0	0	0	—		—		48	2
Heerenveen	2022–23	Eredivisie	33	2	3	0	—		1 (Note: Appearance in Eredivisie European competition play-offs)	0	45	1
Heerenveen	2023–24	Eredivisie	29	3	2	0	—		—		20	0
Heerenveen	2024–25	Eredivisie	13	0	0	0	—		—		29	0
Heerenveen	2025–26	Eredivisie	1	0	1	0	—		—		2	0
Heerenveen	Total		107	7	10	0	—		1	0	118	7
Górnik Zabrze	2025–26	Ekstraklasa	8	1	1	0	—		—		9	1
Górnik Zabrze	2026–27	Ekstraklasa	2	0	0	0	1 (Note: Appearance in UEFA Conference League)	0	0	0	3	0
Górnik Zabrze	Total		10	1	1	0	1	0	0	0	12	1
Career total			257	9	22	1	1	0	1	0	281	10

=== International ===
As of match played 17 November 2023

Appearances and goals by national team and year
National team	Year	Apps	Goals
Poland
Poland	2020	2	0
Poland	2023	1	0
Total		3	0

== Honours ==
Górnik Zabrze

- Polish Cup: 2025–26
