= Fryderyk Gerbowski =

Polish footballer

Personal information
- Date of birth: 17 January 2003 (age 23)
- Place of birth: Warsaw, Poland
- Height: 1.81 m (5 ft 11 in)
- Position: Midfielder

Team information
- Current team: Stal Mielec
- Number: 32

Youth career
- 2010–2013: Białe Orły Warsaw
- 2013–2020: Escola Varsovia Warsaw

Senior career*
Years	Team	Apps	(Gls)
2020–2024	Wisła Płock	43	(2)
2022–2023	→ Stal Mielec (loan)	22	(2)
2024–	Stal Mielec	51	(3)

International career
2017–2018	Poland U15	4	(0)
2018–2019	Poland U16	11	(0)
2019–2020	Poland U17	4	(0)
2022–2024	Poland U20	4	(0)
2022–2024	Poland U21	4	(0)
- * Club domestic league appearances and goals as of 21:06, 26 May 2026 (UTC)

Fryderyk Gerbowski (born 17 January 2003) is a Polish professional footballer who plays as a midfielder for I liga club Stal Mielec.

== Career statistics ==
As of match played 24 May 2026

Appearances and goals by club, season and competition
Club	Season	League			Polish Cup		Europe		Other		Total	
Club	Season	Division	Apps	Goals	Apps	Goals	Apps	Goals	Apps	Goals	Apps	Goals
Wisła Płock	2021–22	Ekstraklasa	18	0	0	0	—		—		18	0
Wisła Płock	2023–24	I liga	25	2	0	0	—		—		25	2
Wisła Płock	Total		43	2	0	0	—		—		43	2
Stal Mielec (loan)	2022–23	Ekstraklasa	22	2	2	0	—		—		24	2
Stal Mielec	2024–25	Ekstraklasa	22	1	1	0	—		—		23	1
Stal Mielec	2025–26	I liga	29	2	1	0	—		—		30	2
Stal Mielec	Total		51	3	2	0	—		—		53	3
Career total			116	7	4	0	0	0	0	0	120	7
