= Tomasz Loska =

Polish footballer (born 1996)

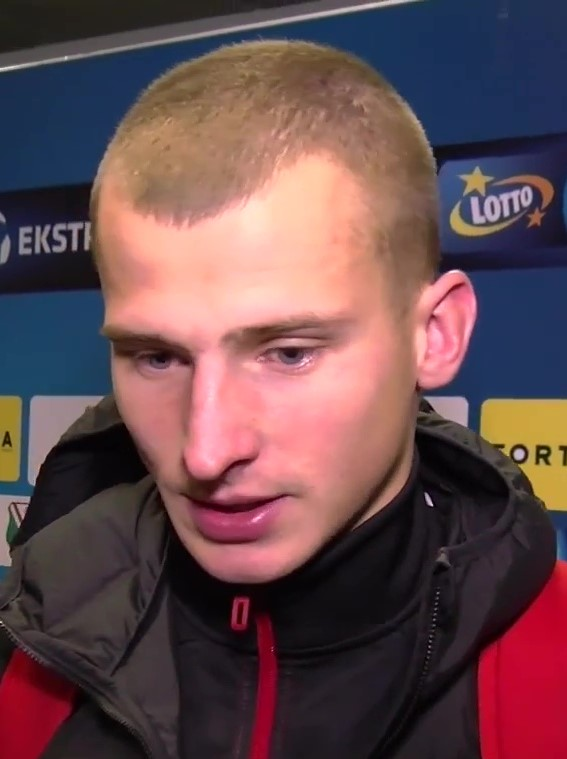
- Loska in 2018

Personal information
- Date of birth: 26 January 1996 (age 30)
- Place of birth: Knurów, Poland
- Height: 1.90 m (6 ft 3 in)
- Position: Goalkeeper

Team information
- Current team: Górnik Zabrze
- Number: 99

Youth career
- –2009: Tempo Paniówki
- 2009–2010: Piast Gliwice
- 2010–2011: Gwarek Ornontowice

Senior career*
Years	Team	Apps	(Gls)
2011–2012	Gwarek Ornontowice		
2012–2013	GKS Tychy	0	(0)
2013–2014	Gwarek Ornontowice	0	(0)
2014–2016	Górnik Zabrze II	14	(0)
2015	→ Nadwiślan Góra (loan)	13	(0)
2016	→ Raków Częstochowa (loan)	19	(0)
2017–2020	Górnik Zabrze	70	(0)
2020	→ Bruk-Bet Termalica (loan)	10	(0)
2020–2024	Bruk-Bet Termalica	114	(0)
2024–2025	Śląsk Wrocław	1	(0)
2024	Śląsk Wrocław II	1	(0)
2025–	Górnik Zabrze	2	(0)

International career
2017	Poland U21	2	(0)
- * Club domestic league appearances and goals as of 19:23, 29 May 2026 (UTC)

Tomasz Loska (born 26 January 1996) is a Polish professional footballer who plays as a goalkeeper for Ekstraklasa club Górnik Zabrze.

== Career ==
=== Górnik Zabrze ===
Loska joined Górnik Zabrze in January 2017. On 30 June 2020, it was confirmed that Loska had joined Bruk-Bet Termalica Nieciecza on loan for the rest of the season.

=== Śląsk Wrocław ===
On 4 June 2024, Loska signed a two-year deal with Polish club Śląsk Wrocław, with the option of a further year.

=== Return to Górnik ===
On 23 June 2025, Loska returned to Górnik Zabrze after over five years, after agreeing on a one-year contract.

== Honours ==
Górnik Zabrze II

- Polish Cup (Zabrze regionals): 2015–16

Śląsk Wrocław II

- III liga, group III: 2024–25

Górnik Zabrze

- Polish Cup: 2025–26

Individual

- I liga Goalkeeper of the Season: 2016–17
- I liga Team of the Season: 2016–17
