= Michał Koj =

Polish footballer (born 1993)

Personal information
- Full name: Michał Koj
- Date of birth: 28 July 1993 (age 33)
- Place of birth: Ruda Śląska, Poland
- Height: 1.88 m (6 ft 2 in)
- Position: Left-back

Team information
- Current team: Wieczysta Kraków II

Youth career
- Slavia Ruda Śląska
- –2008: MSPN Górnik Zabrze
- 2008–2010: Ruch Chorzów
- 2010–2012: Panathinaikos

Senior career*
Years	Team	Apps	(Gls)
2013–2015	Pogoń Szczecin II	19	(0)
2013–2015	Pogoń Szczecin	6	(0)
2015–2017	Ruch Chorzów	43	(5)
2017–2021	Górnik Zabrze	67	(5)
2021–2022	Korona Kielce	25	(2)
2022–2024	Puszcza Niepołomice	43	(4)
2024–2026	Wieczysta Kraków	20	(0)
2024–	Wieczysta Kraków II	9	(0)
- * Club domestic league appearances and goals as of 21:09, 31 May 2026 (UTC)

Michał Koj (born 28 July 1993) is a Polish professional footballer who plays as a left-back for III liga club Wieczysta Kraków II.

== Career ==
At the age of 16, Koj joined the youth academy of Panathinaikos.

== Honours ==
Wieczysta Kraków II

- IV liga Lesser Poland: 2025–26
