= Mateusz Matras =

Polish footballer

Personal information
- Date of birth: 23 January 1991 (age 35)
- Place of birth: Ornontowice, Poland
- Height: 1.93 m (6 ft 4 in)
- Positions: Centre back; defensive midfielder

Team information
- Current team: Gwarek Ornontowice
- Number: 23

Youth career
- –2010: Gwarek Ornontowice

Senior career*
Years	Team	Apps	(Gls)
2010–2014	Piast Gliwice	104	(3)
2014–2017	Pogoń Szczecin	99	(8)
2017	Lechia Gdańsk	7	(1)
2018–2019	Zagłębie Lubin	12	(0)
2018	Zagłębie Lubin II	9	(2)
2019	→ Górnik Zabrze (loan)	16	(3)
2019–2020	Górnik Zabrze	22	(0)
2020	Górnik Zabrze II	4	(0)
2020–2025	Stal Mielec	156	(10)
2025–2026	Zagłębie Sosnowiec	28	(1)
2026–	Gwarek Ornontowice	0	(0)

International career
2010–2011	Poland U20	4	(0)
2011–2012	Poland U21	5	(0)
- * Club domestic league appearances and goals as of 09:39, 31 May 2026 (UTC)

Mateusz Matras (born 23 January 1991) is a Polish professional footballer who plays as a centre back or defensive midfielder for V liga Silesia club Gwarek Ornontowice.

== Club career ==
On 20 August 2020, Matras signed with Stal Mielec.

== Career statistics ==
As of match played 30 May 2026

Appearances and goals by club, season and competition
Club	Season	League			Polish Cup		Europe		Other		Total	
Club	Season	Division	Apps	Goals	Apps	Goals	Apps	Goals	Apps	Goals	Apps	Goals
Piast Gliwice	2010–11	I liga	19	0	0	0	—		—		19	0
Piast Gliwice	2011–12	I liga	27	1	1	0	—		—		28	1
Piast Gliwice	2012–13	Ekstraklasa	25	1	2	0	—		—		27	1
Piast Gliwice	2013–14	Ekstraklasa	33	1	1	0	2 (Note: Appearances in UEFA Europa League)	1	—		36	2
Piast Gliwice	Total		104	3	4	0	2	1	—		110	4
Pogoń Szczecin	2014–15	Ekstraklasa	31	1	1	0	—		—		32	1
Pogoń Szczecin	2015–16	Ekstraklasa	35	2	1	0	—		—		36	2
Pogoń Szczecin	2016–17	Ekstraklasa	33	5	5	0	—		—		38	5
Pogoń Szczecin	Total		99	8	7	0	–		—		106	8
Lechia Gdańsk	2017–18	Ekstraklasa	7	1	1	0	—		—		8	1
Zagłębie Lubin	2017–18	Ekstraklasa	5	0	—		—		—		5	0
Zagłębie Lubin	2018–19	Ekstraklasa	7	0	1	0	—		—		8	0
Zagłębie Lubin	Total		12	0	1	0	–		—		13	0
Zagłębie Lubin II	2017–18	III liga, gr. III	4	1	—		—		—		4	1
Zagłębie Lubin II	2018–19	III liga, gr. III	5	1	—		—		—		5	1
Zagłębie Lubin II	Total		9	2	—		—		—		9	2
Górnik Zabrze (loan)	2018–19	Ekstraklasa	16	3	1	0	—		—		17	3
Górnik Zabrze	2019–20	Ekstraklasa	22	0	1	0	—		—		23	0
Górnik Zabrze	Total		38	3	2	0	—		—		40	3
Górnik Zabrze II	2019–20	III liga, gr. III	1	0	—		—		—		1	0
Górnik Zabrze II	2020–21	III liga, gr. III	3	0	—		—		—		3	0
Górnik Zabrze II	Total		4	0	—		—		—		4	0
Stal Mielec	2020–21	Ekstraklasa	27	1	1	0	—		—		28	1
Stal Mielec	2021–22	Ekstraklasa	34	1	0	0	—		—		34	1
Stal Mielec	2022–23	Ekstraklasa	31	2	2	0	—		—		33	2
Stal Mielec	2023–24	Ekstraklasa	33	3	3	0	—		—		36	3
Stal Mielec	2024–25	Ekstraklasa	31	3	1	0	—		—		32	3
Stal Mielec	Total		156	10	7	0	—		—		163	10
Zagłębie Sosnowiec	2025–26	II liga	28	1	1	0	—		—		29	1
Career total			457	28	23	0	2	1	—		482	29

== Honours ==
Piast Gliwice

- I liga: 2011–12
