= Piotr Wlazło =

Polish footballer

Personal information
- Date of birth: 3 June 1989 (age 37)
- Place of birth: Radom, Poland
- Height: 1.84 m (6 ft 0 in)
- Positions: Midfielder; centre-back

Team information
- Current team: Stal Mielec
- Number: 18

Youth career
- Radomiak Radom

Senior career*
Years	Team	Apps	(Gls)
2007–2010	Radomiak Radom		
2010–2012	Widzew Łódź	0	(0)
2012–2013	Radomiak Radom	60	(5)
2013–2017	Wisła Płock	111	(11)
2017–2018	Jagiellonia Białystok	26	(2)
2018–2022	Bruk-Bet Termalica	111	(28)
2022–	Stal Mielec	121	(20)
- * Club domestic league appearances and goals as of 20:52, 26 May 2026 (UTC)

Piotr Wlazło (born 3 June 1989) is a Polish professional footballer who plays as a midfielder or centre-back for I liga club Stal Mielec.

== Honours ==
Radomiak Radom

- III liga Łódź–Masovia: 2011–12
