= Daniel Liszka =

Polish footballer

Personal information
- Date of birth: 17 February 2000 (age 26)
- Place of birth: Zabrze, Poland
- Height: 1.76 m (5 ft 9 in)
- Position: Left midfielder

Team information
- Current team: Drama Zbrosławice
- Number: 24

Youth career
- Trampkarz 22 Biskupice
- Górnik Zabrze

Senior career*
Years	Team	Apps	(Gls)
2018–2020	Górnik Zabrze	16	(0)
2019–2020	→ GKS Jastrzębie (loan)	14	(0)
2020–2021	Wigry Suwałki	32	(0)
2021–2023	Górnik Zabrze II	47	(1)
2023–	Drama Zbrosławice		

International career
2017	Poland U18	2	(0)
2018–2019	Poland U19	5	(0)
- * Club domestic league appearances and goals as of 19:24, 22 June 2023 (UTC)

Daniel Liszka (born 17 February 2000) is a Polish professional footballer who plays as a left midfielder for IV liga club Drama Zbrosławice.

== Club career ==
On 12 August 2020, he signed a one-year contract with Wigry Suwałki.
