= Daniel Smuga =

Polish footballer (born 1997)

Personal information
- Date of birth: 18 January 1997 (age 29)
- Place of birth: Warsaw, Poland
- Height: 1.82 m (6 ft 0 in)
- Position: Midfielder

Team information
- Current team: Tygrys Huta Mińska
- Number: 25

Youth career
- 2006–2013: MOSiR Mińsk Mazowiecki
- 2013–2014: Białe Orły Warsaw

Senior career*
Years	Team	Apps	(Gls)
2014–2017	Mazovia Mińsk Mazowiecki		
2017	Victoria Sulejówek	16	(11)
2018–2019	Górnik Zabrze	21	(1)
2018	Górnik Zabrze II	8	(3)
2019	Wigry Suwałki	7	(1)
2019	Miedź Legnica II	14	(2)
2020–2021	Polonia Warsaw	25	(4)
2021–2022	Legionovia Legionowo	18	(1)
2023–2024	Płomień Dębe Wielkie	23	(9)
2024–2025	Mazovia Mińsk Mazowiecki II	21	(30)
2025	Mazovia Mińsk Mazowiecki	5	(0)
2025–	Tygrys Huta Mińska	27	(8)
- * Club domestic league appearances and goals as of 16:38, 30 June 2026 (UTC)

Daniel Smuga (born 18 January 1997) is a Polish professional footballer who plays as a midfielder for V liga Masovia club Tygrys Huta Mińska.

== Career ==
Smuga started his career with Polish fifth tier side Mazovia Mińsk Mazowiecki. In 2017, he signed for Victoria Sulejówek in the Polish fourth tier. Before the second half of the 2017–18 season, Smuga signed for Polish top flight club Górnik Zabrze, where he made 26 appearances and scored 5 goals. Before the second half of the 2018–19 season, he signed for Wigry Suwałki in the Polish second tier. In 2019, Smuga signed for Polish fourth tier team Miedź Legnica II.

== Honours ==
Mazovia Mińsk Mazowiecki II

- Regional league Siedlce: 2024–25
