= Rafał Wolsztyński =

Polish footballer (born 1994)

Personal information
- Date of birth: 8 December 1994 (age 31)
- Place of birth: Knurów, Poland
- Height: 1.80 m (5 ft 11 in)
- Position: Forward

Team information
- Current team: Sparta Katowice

Youth career
- –2010: Concordia Knurów
- 2010–2013: Górnik Zabrze

Senior career*
Years	Team	Apps	(Gls)
2013–2018	Górnik Zabrze II	71	(22)
2017–2019	Górnik Zabrze	11	(2)
2015	→ Limanovia Limanowa (loan)	12	(0)
2016	→ Legionovia Legionowo (loan)	14	(7)
2019–2020	Widzew Łódź	41	(13)
2020–2021	Arka Gdynia	24	(3)
2021–2022	SJK	12	(2)
2022–2024	Chrobry Głogów	39	(7)
2024–2026	Sandecja Nowy Sącz	59	(34)
2026	Górnik Łęczna	7	(0)
2026–	Sparta Katowice	0	(0)
- * Club domestic league appearances and goals as of 16:14, 26 May 2026 (UTC)

Rafał Wolsztyński (born 8 December 1994) is a Polish professional footballer who plays as a forward for III liga club Sparta Katowice.

== Early career ==
Wolsztyński started playing football in the youth sector of Concordia Knurów.

== Club career ==
In 2010, Wolsztyński signed for Górnik Zabrze after good performances at junior club level. He was loaned out on two occasions, first to Limanovia Limanowa in 2015, and later to Legionovia Legionowo in 2016. He made his Ekstraklasa debut with Górnik Zabrze in the 2017–18 season. In early 2019, he left the club and signed with Widzew Łódź in the third-tier II liga.

On 20 August 2020, Wolsztyński signed a two-year contract with Arka Gdynia.

On 12 August 2021, Wolsztyński signed with Seinäjoen Jalkapallokerho (SJK) in Finnish top-tier Veikkausliiga. He left the club next June, and joined Chrobry Głogów in Polish second-tier I liga.

In the early 2024, Wolsztyński moved to II liga club Sandecja Nowy Sącz. On 26 February 2026, he joined I liga side Górnik Łęczna on a free transfer.

On 10 July 2026, he moved to fourth-tier club Sparta Katowice.

== Personal life ==
Wolsztyński's twin brother, Łukasz Wolsztyński, is also a professional footballer.

== Career statistics ==
As of match played 24 May 2026

Appearances and goals by club, season and competition
Club	Season	League			National cup (Note: Includes Polish Cup, Suomen Cup)		Continental		Other		Total	
Club	Season	Division	Apps	Goals	Apps	Goals	Apps	Goals	Apps	Goals	Apps	Goals
Limanovia Limanowa (loan)	2014–15	II liga	14	0	—		—		—		14	0
Legionovia Legionowo (loan)	2015–16	II liga	14	8	—		—		—		14	8
Górnik Zabrze	2015–16	Ekstraklasa	0	0	0	0	—		—		0	0
Górnik Zabrze	2016–17	I liga	1	0	0	0	—		—		1	0
Górnik Zabrze	2017–18	Ekstraklasa	5	2	2	1	—		—		7	3
Górnik Zabrze	2018–19	Ekstraklasa	6	0	2	0	1 (Note: Appearance in UEFA Europa League)	0	—		9	0
Górnik Zabrze	Total		12	2	4	1	1	0	0	0	17	3
Widzew Łódź	2018–19	II liga	11	4	—		—		—		11	4
Widzew Łódź	2019–20	II liga	30	9	1	0	—		—		31	9
Widzew Łódź	2020–21	I liga	0	0	1	0	—		—		1	0
Widzew Łódź	Total		41	13	2	0	0	0	0	0	43	13
Arka Gdynia	2020–21	I liga	24	3	1	0	—		—		25	3
SJK	2021	Veikkausliiga	7	1	0	0	—		—		7	1
SJK	2022	Veikkausliiga	5	1	0	0	0	0	4 (Note: Includes Finnish League Cup)	2	9	3
SJK	Total		12	2	0	0	0	0	4	2	16	4
Chrobry Głogów	2022–23	I liga	31	5	2	0	—		—		33	5
Chrobry Głogów	2023–24	I liga	8	2	0	0	—		—		8	2
Chrobry Głogów	Total		39	7	2	0	0	0	0	0	41	7
Sandecja Nowy Sącz	2023–24	II liga	15	5	—		—		—		15	5
Sandecja Nowy Sącz	2024–25	III liga, group IV	27	25	3	0	—		—		30	25
Sandecja Nowy Sącz	2025–26	II liga	17	4	—		—		—		17	4
Sandecja Nowy Sącz	Total		59	34	3	0	0	0	0	0	62	34
Górnik Łęczna	2025–26	I liga	7	0	—		—		—		7	0
Sparta Katowice	2026–27	III liga, group III	0	0	—		—		—		0	0
Career total			222	69	12	1	1	0	4	2	239	72

== Honours ==
Górnik Zabrze II

- Polish Cup (Zabrze regionals): 2013–14, 2015–16

Sandecja Nowy Sącz

- III liga, group IV: 2024–25
- Polish Cup (Nowy Sącz regionals): 2024–25

Individual

- III liga, group IV top scorer: 2024–25
