= Łukasz Wolsztyński =

Polish footballer

Personal information
- Full name: Łukasz Wolsztyński
- Date of birth: 8 December 1994 (age 31)
- Place of birth: Knurów, Poland
- Height: 1.83 m (6 ft 0 in)
- Positions: Attacking midfielder; forward

Team information
- Current team: Unia Skierniewice
- Number: 25

Youth career
- Concordia Knurów
- 2012–2014: Górnik Zabrze

Senior career*
Years	Team	Apps	(Gls)
2013–2020	Górnik Zabrze II	63	(7)
2014–2021	Górnik Zabrze	100	(14)
2015	→ Limanovia Limanowa (loan)	13	(3)
2016	→ Legionovia Legionowo (loan)	13	(2)
2021	Arka Gdynia	15	(0)
2021–2023	Chojniczanka Chojnice	40	(4)
2023	Kotwica Kołobrzeg	4	(0)
2023–2025	Stal Mielec	42	(7)
2025–2026	Tatran Prešov	8	(0)
2026–	Unia Skierniewice	0	(0)
- * Club domestic league appearances and goals as of 11:45, 17 May 2026 (UTC)

Łukasz Wolsztyński (born 8 December 1994) is a Polish professional footballer who plays as an attacking midfielder for I liga club Unia Skierniewice. He is the twin brother of Rafał Wolsztyński.

In 2012, Wolsztyński signed for Górnik Zabrze. In 2015, he was loaned to Limanovia Limanowa. The following year, he went on loan to Legionovia Legionowo before coming back to the club and making successive appearances both in the starting line-up and off the bench in the following seasons.

== Honours ==
Górnik Zabrze II

- Polish Cup (Zabrze regionals): 2013–14, 2015–16

Individual

- I liga Right Midfielder of the Season: 2016–17
- I liga Team of the Season: 2016–17
