= Arena Zabrze =

Football stadium in Zabrze, Poland

Coordinates: 50°17′47″N 18°46′7″E

- UEFA Category 4 Stadium
- Interactive map of Arena Zabrze
- Full name: Stadion im. Ernesta Pohla w Zabrzu
- Address: ul. Roosevelta 81; Zabrze; Poland
- Location: Zabrze, Poland
- Owner: City of Zabrze
- Operator: Stadion w Zabrzu sp. z o.o.
- Capacity: 28,499 (31,871 after completion)
- Surface: Grass
- Record attendance: 50,000; Górnik 3–1 Gwardia W. September 22, 1957
- Field size: 105 × 68 m
- Public transit: Zabrze Stadion

Construction
- Built: 1934 (old stadium); 2011–2016 (new stadium)
- Opened: September 2, 1934; February 21, 2016
- Renovated: 1935, 1957, 1965, 1967, 1988, 2001, 2003, 2006, 2008, 2011–2016, 2023–2025
- Cost: 192.5 mn PLN
- Architects: Gustav Allinger (old stadium); GMT Sp. z o.o. (new stadium)

Tenant
- Górnik Zabrze (1949– )

Website
- https://arena-zabrze.pl/

The Arena Zabrze, officially known as the Stadion im. Ernesta Pohla w Zabrzu (Ernest Pohl Stadium in Zabrze), is a football stadium in Zabrze, Poland. It is the home ground of Górnik Zabrze. Originally constructed in 1934, since 2011 it is in the process of complete rebuilding. It has a current seated capacity of 28,499.

== History ==
Built in 1934 in what was then Germany as Adolf-Hitler-Kampfbahn (en: Adolf Hitler Arena), this name was used until 1946. After World War II, in 1945, Zabrze was incorporated into Poland, and Soviet troops stationed at the stadium destroyed its pitch, but the name from the times of German administration was used in documents until 1946.

In 2004 (the name came into effect in 2005) it was given the new name of Ernest Pohl, a famous Polish footballer who played for Górnik Zabrze. Since 2016, the stadium is named "Arena Zabrze", although the formal name is still "Ernest Pohl Stadium in Zabrze".

== New stadium ==
A first stage of renovation, which left the main stand while completely rebuilding the other three stands, was approved for 192.5 million złoty. The stands were opened on February 21, 2016 and held 24,563 spectators.

In 2023, a second phase of renovation (main stand) was started, which was completed in 2025. This increased the stadium capacity to 28,236. In 2026, the capacity was further extended to 28,499.

Completed stadium will have a capacity of 31,871.

== Gallery ==
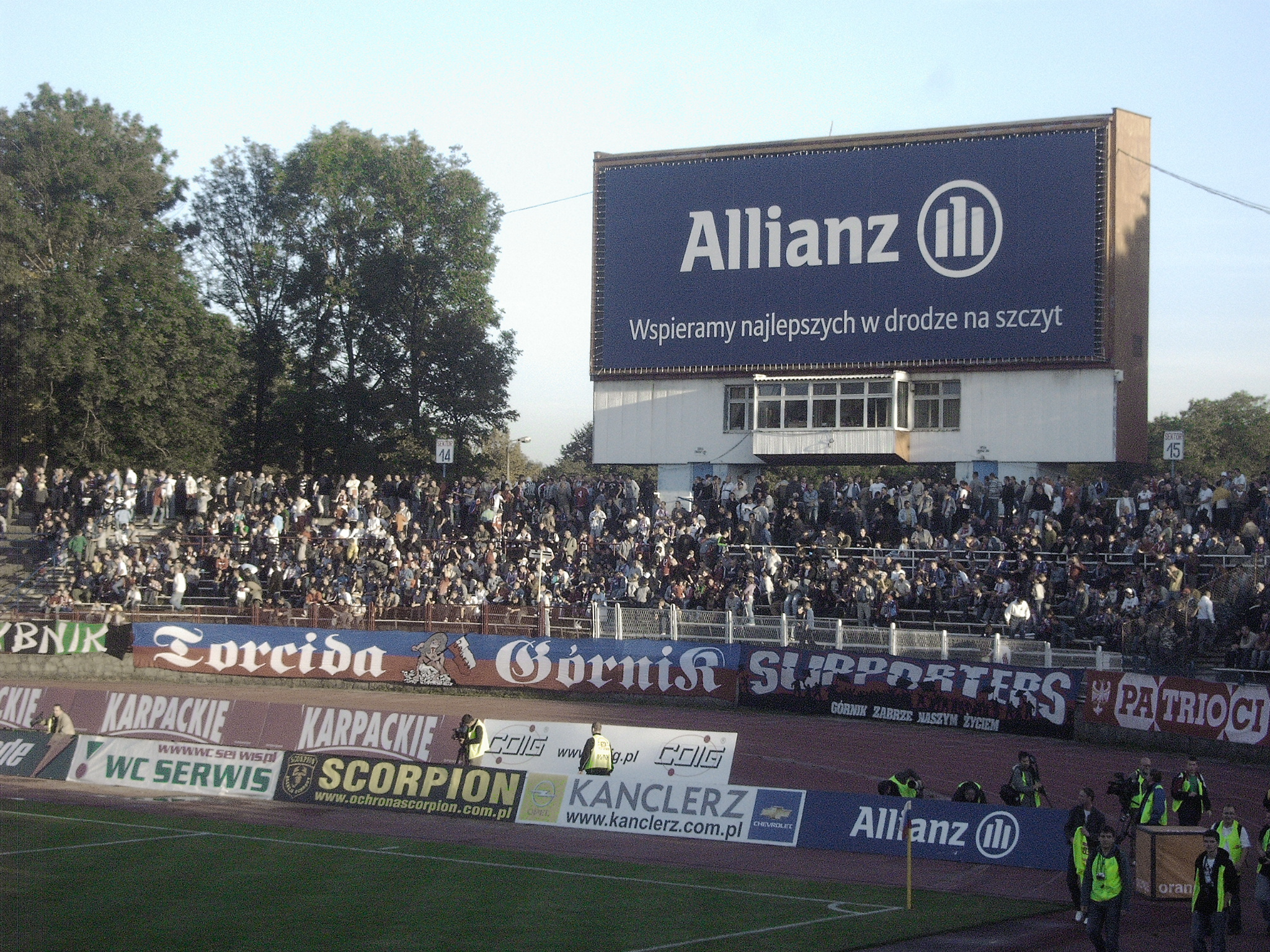
Fans of Górnik at the old stadium in September 2007

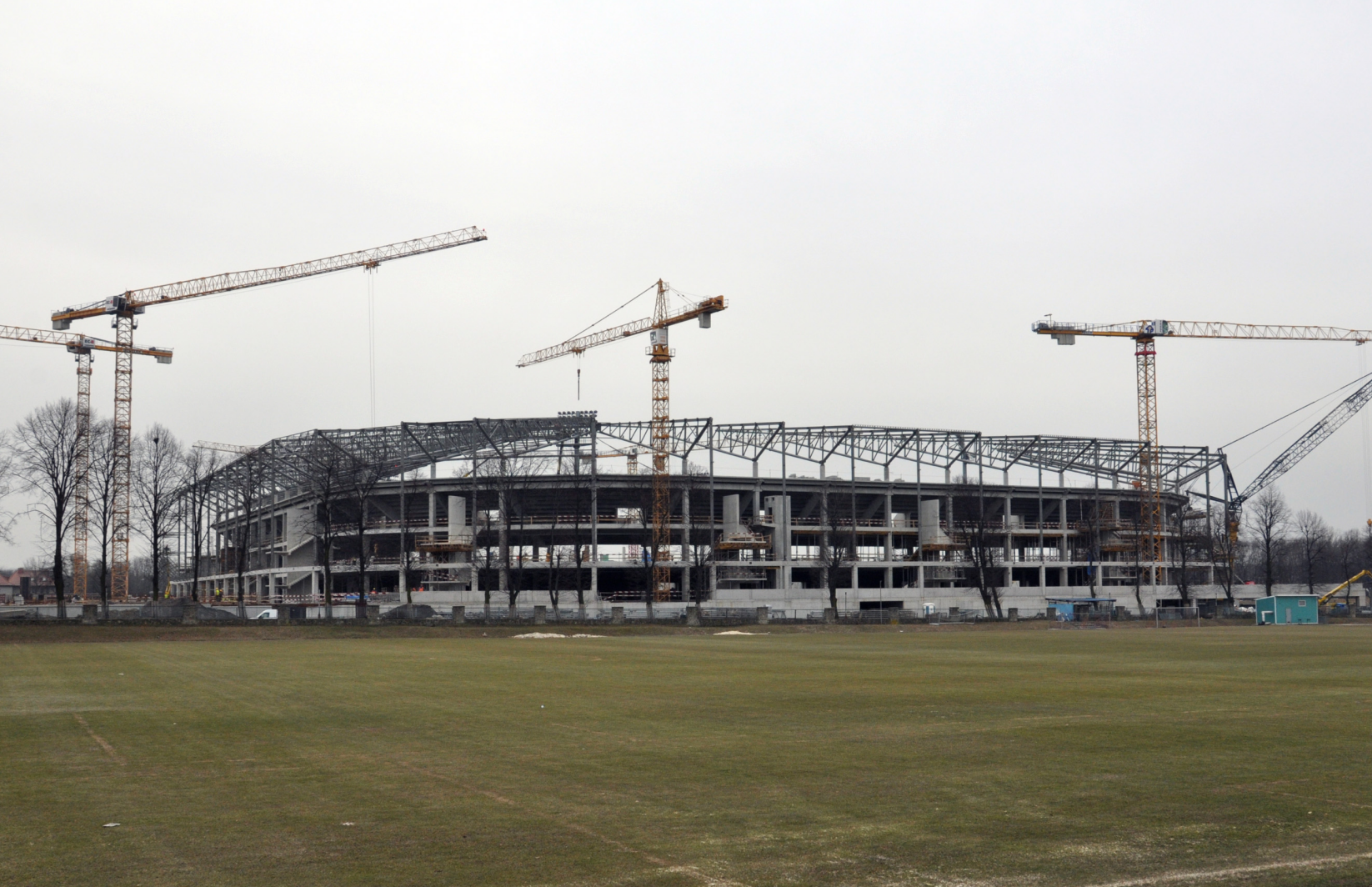
The stadium during renovation in March 2013

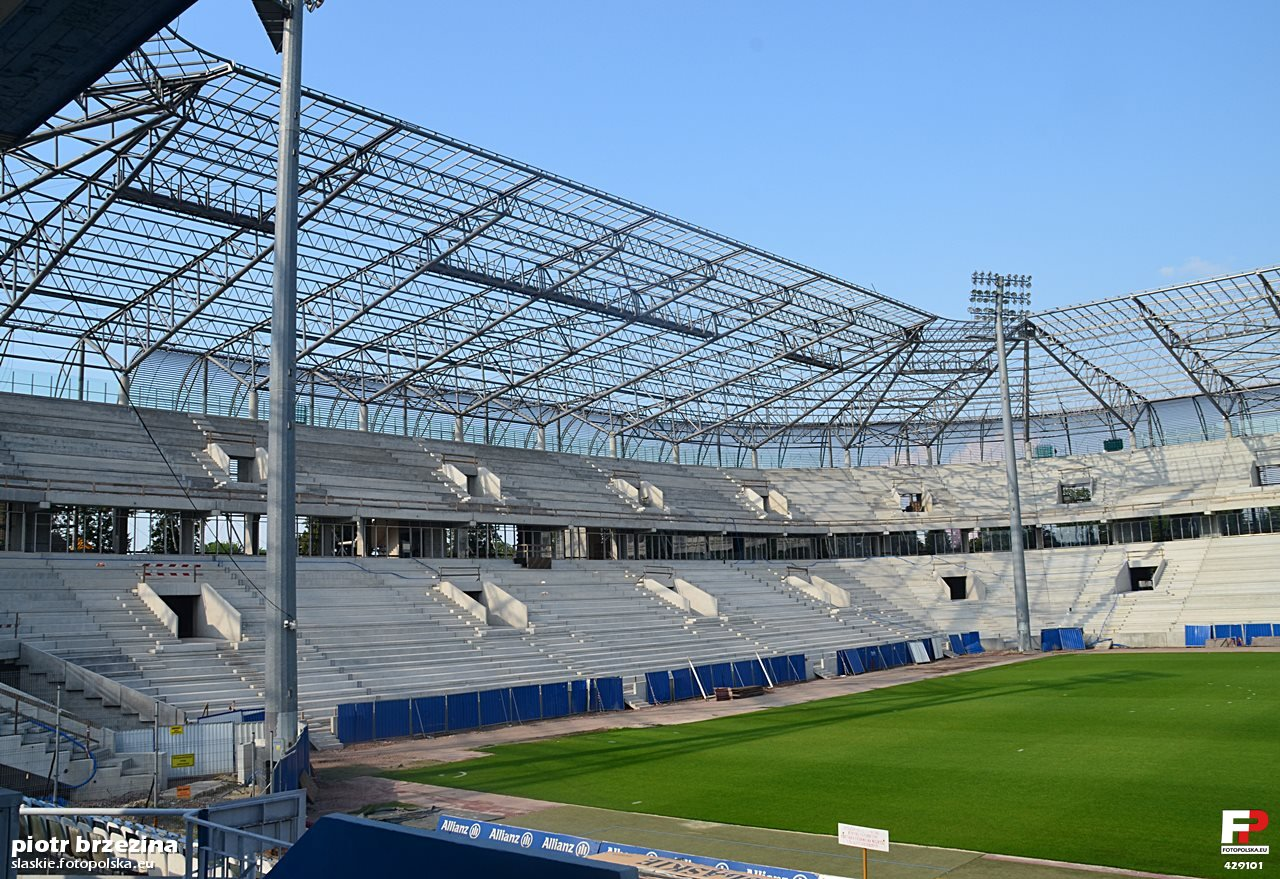
Inside renovation in July 2013

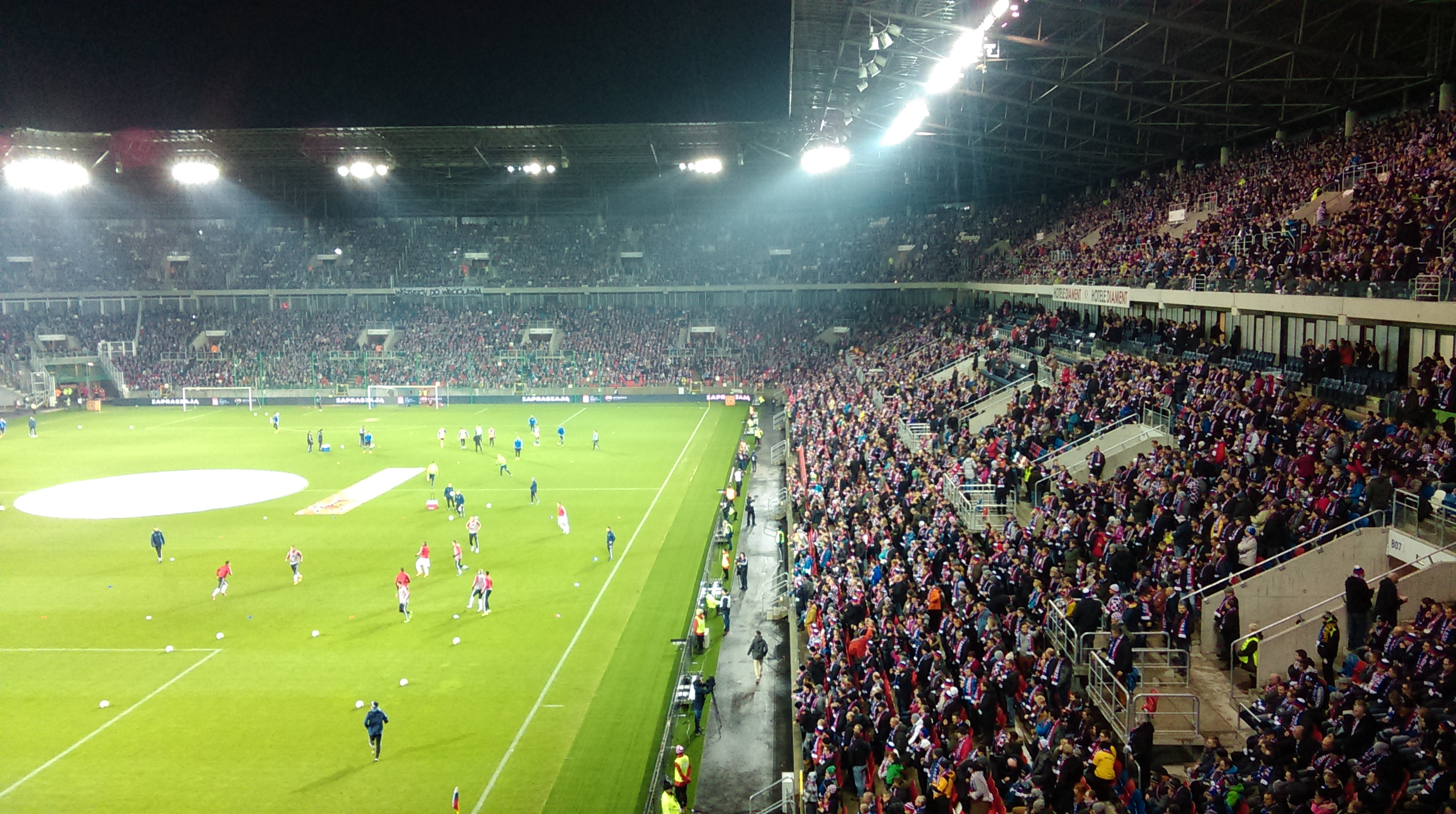
Inside of the stadium in February 2016

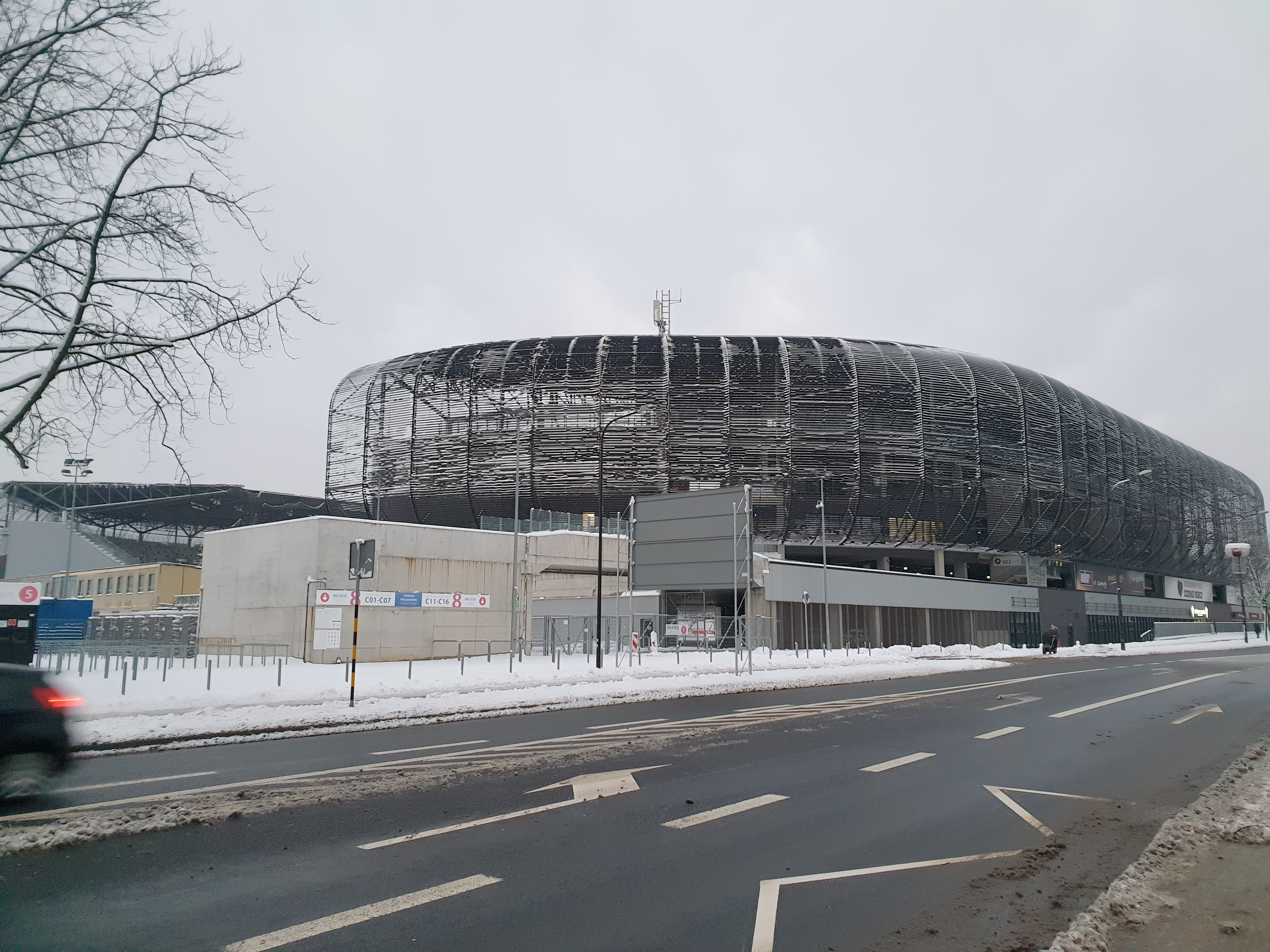
The stadium from the outside in January 2021

== See also ==
- Ernest Pohl
- List of football stadiums in Poland
