= Michał Nalepa (footballer, born 1995) =

Polish footballer

Personal information
- Full name: Michał Jan Nalepa
- Date of birth: 24 March 1995 (age 31)
- Place of birth: Wejherowo, Poland
- Height: 1.70 m (5 ft 7 in)
- Position: Midfielder

Team information
- Current team: Odra Opole

Youth career
- Jedynka Reda
- 2009–2013: Arka Gdynia

Senior career*
Years	Team	Apps	(Gls)
2013–2014	Arka Gdynia II	27	(5)
2014–2020	Arka Gdynia	164	(18)
2020–2021	Giresunspor	26	(2)
2021–2022	Jagiellonia Białystok	14	(0)
2022–2023	Sakaryaspor	35	(2)
2023–2024	Çorum	29	(4)
2024–2025	Gençlerbirliği	35	(5)
2026	Serikspor	16	(1)
2026–	Odra Opole	0	(0)

International career
2015–2016	Poland U20	4	(1)
2015	Poland U21	1	(0)
- * Club domestic league appearances and goals as of 7 May 2026

Michał Jan Nalepa (born 24 March 1995) is a Polish professional footballer who plays as a midfielder for I liga club Odra Opole.

== Career statistics ==
As of match played 1 May 2026

Appearances and goals by club, season and competition
Club	Season	League			National cup (Note: Includes Polish Cup, Turkish Cup)		Europe		Other		Total	
Club	Season	Division	Apps	Goals	Apps	Goals	Apps	Goals	Apps	Goals	Apps	Goals
Arka Gdynia II	2012–13	III liga, gr. D	1	0	—		—		—		1	0
Arka Gdynia II	2013–14	III liga, gr. D	24	5	—		—		—		24	5
Arka Gdynia II	2014–15	III liga, gr. D	2	0	—		—		—		2	0
Arka Gdynia II	Total		27	5	—		—		—		27	5
Arka Gdynia	2014–15	I liga	33	3	1	0	—		—		34	3
Arka Gdynia	2015–16	I liga	29	5	1	0	—		—		30	5
Arka Gdynia	2016–17	Ekstraklasa	10	0	2	0	—		—		12	0
Arka Gdynia	2017–18	Ekstraklasa	27	1	5	0	1 (Note: Appearance(s) in UEFA Europa League)	0	1 (Note: Appearance in Polish Super Cup)	0	34	1
Arka Gdynia	2018–19	Ekstraklasa	29	2	2	0	—		1	0	32	2
Arka Gdynia	2019–20	Ekstraklasa	36	7	0	0	—		—		36	7
Arka Gdynia	Total		164	18	11	0	1	0	2	0	178	18
Giresunspor	2020–21	TFF 1. Lig	26	2	0	0	—		—		26	2
Jagiellonia Białystok	2021–22	Ekstraklasa	14	0	0	0	—		—		14	0
Sakaryaspor	2022–23	TFF 1. Lig	31	1	1	0	—		—		32	1
Sakaryaspor	2023–24	TFF 1. Lig	4	1	0	0	—		—		4	0
Sakaryaspor	Total		35	2	1	0	—		—		36	2
Çorum	2023–24	TFF 1. Lig	29	4	1	0	—		—		30	4
Gençlerbirliği	2024–25	TFF 1. Lig	32	5	1	1	—		—		33	6
Gençlerbirliği	2025–26	Süper Lig	3	0	—		—		—		3	0
Gençlerbirliği	Total		35	5	1	1	—		—		36	6
Serikspor	2025–26	TFF 1. Lig	16	1	—		—		—		16	1
Odra Opole	2026–27	I liga	0	0	0	0	—		—		0	0
Career total			346	37	14	1	1	0	2	0	363	38

== Honours ==
Arka Gdynia

- I liga: 2015–16
- Polish Cup: 2016–17
- Polish Super Cup: 2017, 2018

Individual

- I liga Player of the Year: 2015
