= Mariusz Jop =

Polish footballer (born 1978)

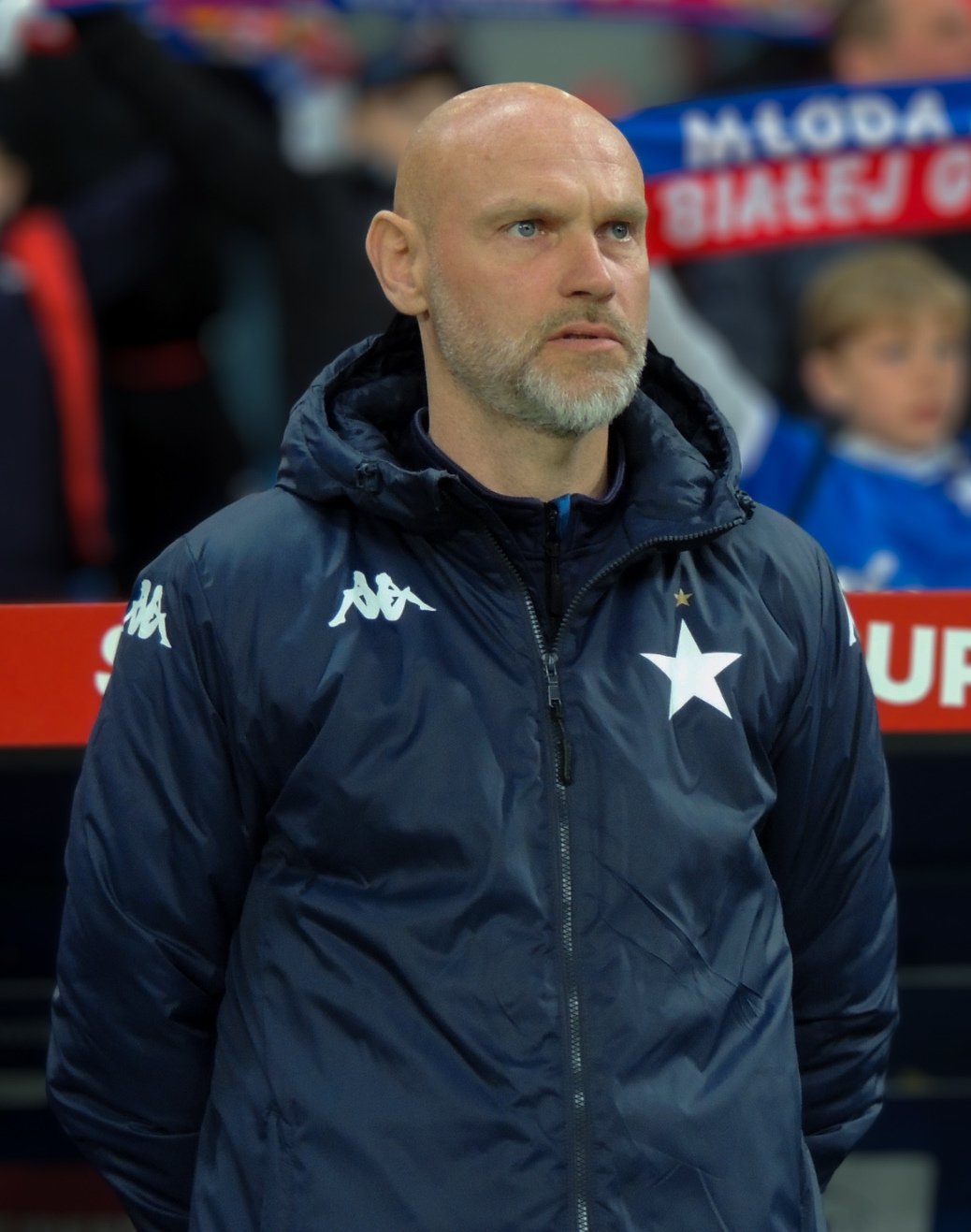
- Jop as manager of Wisła Kraków in 2026

Personal information
- Birth name: Mariusz Jop
- Date of birth: 3 August 1978 (age 48)
- Place of birth: Ostrowiec Świętokrzyski, Poland
- Height: 1.88 m (6 ft 2 in)
- Position: Defender

Team information
- Current team: Wisła Kraków (manager)

Senior career*
Years	Team	Apps	(Gls)
1995–1999	KSZO Ostrowiec Św.	78	(3)
1999–2004	Wisła Kraków	60	(6)
2001	→ Widzew Łódź (loan)	26	(2)
2004–2009	FC Moscow	86	(4)
2009–2010	Wisła Kraków	12	(0)
2010–2011	Górnik Zabrze	23	(0)
Total		285	(15)

International career
2003–2008	Poland	27	(0)

Managerial career
- 2019–2020: Wisła Kraków II
- 2023: Wisła Kraków II
- 2023: Wisła Kraków (caretaker)
- 2024–: Wisła Kraków
- * Club domestic league appearances and goals

Mariusz Jop [ˈmarjuʂ ˈjɔp] (born 3 August 1978) is a Polish professional football manager and former player. He is currently the manager of Ekstraklasa club Wisła Kraków.

== Club career ==
=== Beginnings ===
Born in Ostrowiec Świętokrzyski, Jop started out playing for KSZO Ostrowiec Świętokrzyski. He won the Polish championship with Wisła Kraków in the 2000–01, 2002–03 and 2003–04 seasons.

=== Playing in Russia and return to Poland ===
In 2004, Jop signed for FC Moscow. While playing for FC Moscow, he became the first Pole to score a goal in the Russian Premier League. On 11 July 2009, he returned to Wisła as a free agent after terminating his contract with FC Moscow.

=== Later club career ===
On 18 June 2010, Jop signed a two-year contract with Górnik Zabrze. Jop retired from professional football on 18 October 2011.

== International career ==
On 30 April 2003, Jop made his international debut for Poland in a friendly match against Belgium.

He was selected to the 23-men national team for the 2006 FIFA World Cup finals in Germany. He was also included in the Polish Euro 2008 squad and made one appearance in a group match against Austria.

== Managerial career ==
=== Assistant and interim roles ===
On 14 May 2021, Jop was announced the interim assistant for the Ekstraklasa side Wisła Kraków to the interim manager Kazimierz Kmiecik, after Peter Hyballa had finished his coaching duties.

On 2 December 2023, Jop's former teammate Radosław Sobolewski resigned from his position as manager of Wisła. The following day, Jop, having coached Wisła's reserves side since July that year, was named caretaker manager until the end of 2023. He led Wisła to three wins in three games across all competitions, before joining Albert Rudé's staff as an assistant on 29 December, when the Spaniard was appointed permanent manager.

=== As head coach ===
On 24 September 2024, following the dismissal of Kazimierz Moskal, Jop took charge of Wisła as a caretaker again. After recording seven wins, two draws and one loss in his first ten games in charge, Jop was appointed on a permanent basis until the end of the season on 23 November. On 31 December, his contract was extended until June 2026.

In the 2025–26 season, he led Wisła Kraków back to the Ekstraklasa, a place the club had longed to return to after four years in the lower tier.

== Career statistics ==
=== Club ===
Appearances and goals by club, season and competition
Club	Season	League			National cup (Note: Includes Polish Cup, Russian Cup)		Europe		Other		Total	
Club	Season	Division	Apps	Goals	Apps	Goals	Apps	Goals	Apps	Goals	Apps	Goals
KSZO Ostrowiec	1995–96	II liga	7	0	—		—		—		7	0
KSZO Ostrowiec	1996–97	II liga	16	0			—		—		16	0
KSZO Ostrowiec	1997–98	Ekstraklasa	31	1	1 (Note: Doesn't include these Polish Cup matches: 2nd round: Ceramika Białaczów – KSZO Ostrowiec 0–8 3rd round: Avia Świdnik – KSZO Ostrowiec 1–2)		—		—		32	1
KSZO Ostrowiec	1998–99	II liga	24	2	1	0	—		—		25	2
KSZO Ostrowiec	Total		78	3	2	0	—		—		80	3
Wisła Kraków	1999–2000	Ekstraklasa	13	2	3	1	—		5 (Note: Four appearances in Polish League Cup, one appearance in Polish Super Cup)	0	21	3
Wisła Kraków	2000–01	Ekstraklasa	1	0	0	0	0	0	0	0	1	0
Wisła Kraków	2001–02	Ekstraklasa	7	0	3	1	—		5 (Note: Appearances in Polish League Cup)	0	15	1
Wisła Kraków	2002–03	Ekstraklasa	23	2	8	2	10 (Note: Appearances in UEFA Cup)	0	—		41	4
Wisła Kraków	2003–04	Ekstraklasa	16	2	1	0	7 (Note: Four appearances in UEFA Champions League, three appearances in UEFA Cup)	0	—		24	2
Wisła Kraków	Total		60	6	15	4	17	0	10	0	102	10
Widzew Łódź (loan)	2000–01	Ekstraklasa	15	0	—		—		—		15	0
Widzew Łódź (loan)	2001–02	Ekstraklasa	11	2	1	0	—		0	0	12	2
Widzew Łódź (loan)	Total		26	2	1	0	—		0	0	27	2
FC Moscow	2004	Premier Liga	15	3	1	0	—		—		16	3
FC Moscow	2005	Premier Liga	27	1	2	0	—		—		29	1
FC Moscow	2006	Premier Liga	9	0	2	0	1 (Note: Appearance in UEFA Intertoto Cup)	0	—		12	0
FC Moscow	2007	Premier Liga	9	0	3	0	—		—		12	0
FC Moscow	2008	Premier Liga	23	0	2	0	3	0	—		28	0
FC Moscow	2009	Premier Liga	3	0	0	0	—		—		3	0
FC Moscow	Total		86	4	10	0	4	0	—		100	4
Wisła Kraków	2009–10	Ekstraklasa	12	0	2	0	1 (Note: Appearance in UEFA Champions League)	0	0	0	15	0
Górnik Zabrze	2010–11	Ekstraklasa	23	0	2	0	—		—		25	0
Career total			285	15	32	4	22	0	10	0	349	19

=== International ===
Appearances and goals by national team and year
National team	Year	Apps	Goals
Poland	2003	2	0
Poland	2005	6	0
Poland	2006	7	0
Poland	2007	6	0
Poland	2008	6	0
Total		27	0

== Managerial statistics ==
As of match played 21 November 2026

Managerial record by team and tenure
Team	From	To	Record							
Team	From	To	G	W	D	L	GF	GA	GD	Win %
Wisła Kraków II	27 November 2019	30 June 2020	0	0	0	0	0	0	+0	—
Wisła Kraków II	2 July 2023	3 December 2023	18	14	3	1	53	19	+34	77.78
Wisła Kraków (caretaker)	3 December 2023	29 December 2023	3	3	0	0	10	2	+8	100.00
Wisła Kraków	24 September 2024	Present	84	47	20	17	158	86	+72	55.95
Total			105	64	23	18	221	107	+114	60.95

== Honours ==
=== Player ===
Wisła Kraków

- Ekstraklasa: 2000–01, 2002–03, 2003–04
- Polish Cup: 2001–02, 2002–03

=== Manager ===
Wisła Kraków

- I liga: 2025–26

Individual

- I liga Coach of the Season: 2025–26
- I liga Coach of the Month: July & August 2025
