= Marcin Baszczyński =

Polish footballer (born 1977)

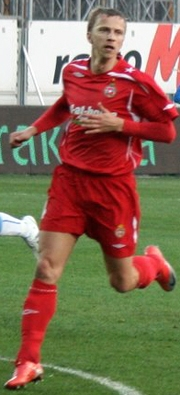

Personal information
- Full name: Marcin Baszczyński
- Date of birth: 7 June 1977 (age 49)
- Place of birth: Ruda Śląska, Poland
- Height: 1.82 m (5 ft 11 1/2 in)
- Position: Defender

Senior career*
Years	Team	Apps	(Gls)
1994–1995	Pogoń Ruda Śląska		
1995–2000	Ruch Chorzów	124	(2)
2000–2009	Wisła Kraków	221	(10)
2009–2011	Atromitos	45	(1)
2011–2013	Polonia Warsaw	35	(0)
2013	Ruch Chorzów	9	(0)

International career
2000–2006	Poland	35	(1)
- * Club domestic league appearances and goals

Marcin Baszczyński (Polish pronunciation: [ˈmart͡ɕin baʂˈtʂɨɲskʲi]; born 7 June 1977) is a Polish football pundit, co-commentator and former player who played as a defender.

== Club career ==
Baszczyński started his career at Pogoń Ruda Śląska. In 1995, he joined Ruch Chorzów. In 2000, he moved to Wisła Kraków. With Wisła he won six Polish League Championships in 2000–01, 2002–03, 2003–04, 2004–05, 2007–08 and 2008–09 seasons.

In June 2011, he joined Polonia Warsaw on a two-year contract.

In January 2013, he rejoined Ruch Chorzów where he spent the last year of his playing career.

== International career ==
Baszczyński has appeared 35 times for Poland, scoring once.

He was selected to the 23-man national squad for the 2006 FIFA World Cup finals held in Germany.

== Career statistics ==
=== Club ===
Appearances and goals by club, season and competition
Club	Season	League			National cup (Note: Includes Polish Cup, Greek Cup)		Europe		Other		Total	
Club	Season	Division	Apps	Goals	Apps	Goals	Apps	Goals	Apps	Goals	Apps	Goals
Ruch Chorzów	1995–96	II liga	17	0	4	0	—		—		21	0
Ruch Chorzów	1996–97	Ekstraklasa	26	0	2	0	2 (Note: Appearances in UEFA Cup Winners' Cup)	0	—		30	0
Ruch Chorzów	1997–98	Ekstraklasa	29	1	1	0	—		—		30	1
Ruch Chorzów	1998–99	Ekstraklasa	28	0	6	0	9 (Note: Appearances in UEFA Intertoto Cup)	0	—		43	0
Ruch Chorzów	1999–2000	Ekstraklasa	24	1	2	0	—		0	0	26	1
Ruch Chorzów	Total		124	2	15	0	11	0	0	0	150	2
Wisła Kraków	2000–01	Ekstraklasa	30	1	1	0	6 (Note: Appearances in UEFA Cup)	0	5 (Note: Appearances in Polish League Cup)	0	42	1
Wisła Kraków	2001–02	Ekstraklasa	24	1	8	0	7 (Note: Three appearances in UEFA Champions League, four appearances in UEFA Cup)	0	8 (Note: Seven appearances in Polish League Cup, one appearance in Polish Super Cup)	0	47	1
Wisła Kraków	2002–03	Ekstraklasa	25	1	6	1	10	0	—		41	2
Wisła Kraków	2003–04	Ekstraklasa	24	1	1	0	8 (Note: Four appearances and one goal in UEFA Champions League, four appearances in UEFA Cup)	1	—		33	2
Wisła Kraków	2004–05	Ekstraklasa	25	2	9	0	5 (Note: Three appearances in UEFA Champions League, two appearances in UEFA Cup)	0	—		39	2
Wisła Kraków	2005–06	Ekstraklasa	28	2	4	0	3 (Note: One appearance in UEFA Champions League, two appearances in UEFA Cup)	0	—		35	2
Wisła Kraków	2006–07	Ekstraklasa	20	0	1	0	5	0	3 (Note: Appearances in Ekstraklasa Cup)	0	29	0
Wisła Kraków	2007–08	Ekstraklasa	27	1	7	0	—		4	0	38	1
Wisła Kraków	2008–09	Ekstraklasa	18	1	2	0	6 (Note: Four appearances in UEFA Champions League, two appearances in UEFA Cup)	0	4	0	30	1
Wisła Kraków	Total		221	10	39	1	50	1	24	0	334	12
Atromitos	2009–10	Super League Greece	20	1	0	0	—		—		20	1
Atromitos	2010–11	Super League Greece	25	0	5	0	—		—		30	0
Atromitos	Total		45	1	5	0	—		—		50	1
Polonia Warsaw	2011–12	Ekstraklasa	23	0	1	0	—		—		24	0
Polonia Warsaw	2012–13	Ekstraklasa	12	0	1	0	—		—		13	0
Polonia Warsaw	Total		35	0	2	0	—		—		37	0
Ruch Chorzów	2012–13	Ekstraklasa	9	0	3	0	—		—		12	0
Career total			434	13	64	1	61	1	24	0	583	15

=== International ===
Appearances and goals by national team and year
National team	Year	Apps	Goals
Poland
Poland	2000	1	0
Poland	2002	1	0
Poland	2003	8	0
Poland	2004	6	0
Poland	2005	11	1
Poland	2006	8	0
Total		35	1

Scores and results list Poland's goal tally first, score column indicates score after each Baszczyński goal.

List of international goals scored by Marcin Baszczyński
No.	Date	Venue	Opponent	Score	Result	Competition
1	7 October 2005	Warsaw, Poland	Iceland	2–2	3–2	Friendly

== Honours ==
Ruch Chorzów

- Polish Cup: 1995–96

Wisła Kraków

- Ekstraklasa: 2000–01, 2002–03, 2003–04, 2004–05, 2007–08, 2008–09
- Polish Cup: 2001–02, 2002–03
- Polish League Cup: 2000–01
- Polish Super Cup: 2001

Individual

- Ekstraklasa Defender of the Year: 2004, 2005
