= Sunday Ibrahim =

Nigerian footballer (born 1980)

Personal information
- Date of birth: 20 December 1980 (age 45)
- Place of birth: Ibadan, Nigeria
- Height: 1.72 m (5 ft 7 1/2 in)
- Position: Midfielder

Youth career
- Greater Tomorrow
- Liberty Boys

Senior career*
Years	Team	Apps	(Gls)
1995	Nigerdock		
1996	Eagle Cement	26	(4)
1997	Nigerdock	30	(1)
1997–2004	Wisła Kraków	44	(3)
2003	→ KSZO Ostrowiec (loan)	10	(2)
2004	Chengdu Wuniu	14	(2)
2005	Strømsgodset	22	(0)
2006–2007	Zagłębie Lubin	12	(0)
2008	Hutnik Kraków	13	(0)
2008–2009	GKP Gorzów Wielkopolski	9	(0)
2009–2010	Stal Rzeszów	6	(0)
2010–2011	Warta Sieradz	9	(1)
2012	LZS Piotrówka	4	(0)
2015–2017	Zjednoczeni Branice		
- * Club domestic league appearances and goals

Sunday Ibrahim (born 20 December 1980) is a Nigerian former professional footballer who played as a midfielder in the Ekstraklasa in Poland for Wisła Kraków, KSZO Ostrowiec Świętokrzyski and Zagłębie Lubin. He also played in his native Nigeria, in China and in Norway.

== Career ==
Ibrahim was born in Ibadan, and began his football career with his hometown club, Greater Tomorrow, as a youngster. He also played for Liberty Boys, Nigerdock and Eagle Cement before moving to Poland to sign for Wisła Kraków for the 1997–98 season. He made his Ekstraklasa debut on 28 March 1998 in an away match against KSZO Ostrowiec Świętokrzyski. Taking the field as a 72nd-minute substitute, he scored the only goal of the game seven minutes later. He finished the season with ten Ekstraklasa appearances, all but one as a substitute, and three goals. The following season he made 13 appearances as Wisła won the 1998–99 Ekstraklasa title, and played in the finals of the 2001 and 2002 Ekstraklasa Cup and the 2001–02 Polish Cup. He played several times for the club in the UEFA Cup and Champions League.

In 2003, he spent a few months on loan at Ekstraklasa club KSZO Ostrowiec Świętokrzyski, but on his return to Wisła was only picked for the reserves, so he chose to leave. He joined Chinese club Chengdu Wuniu and then Strømsgodset in the Norwegian Adeccoligaen, before returning to the Ekstraklasa with Zagłębie Lubin. He again played in the Polish Cup Final, in 2006, but had problems with weight and fitness. After surgery on a knee injury and subsequent rehabilitation, he went on to play in the lower divisions of the Polish league with Hutnik Kraków, GKP Gorzów Wielkopolski, Stal Rzeszów and Warta Sieradz.

== Honours ==
Wisła Kraków

- Ekstraklasa: 1998–99, 2000–01
- Polish Cup: 2001–02
- Polish League Cup: 2000–01
