= Artur Sarnat =

Polish footballer (1970–2024)

Personal information
- Date of birth: 20 September 1970
- Place of birth: Kraków, Poland
- Date of death: 17 November 2024 (aged 54)
- Height: 1.88 m (6 ft 2 in)
- Position: Goalkeeper

Youth career
- Wawel Kraków

Senior career*
Years	Team	Apps	(Gls)
1990–1992	Wawel Kraków		
1990–1992	Świt Krzeszowice		
1990–1992	Wawel Kraków		
1992	Błękitni Kielce	3	(0)
1993	Cracovia	11	(0)
1993–2001	Wisła Kraków	199	(0)
2001	Diyarbakirspor	4	(0)
2002–2003	Wisła Kraków	6	(0)
2004	Polonia Warsaw	12	(0)
2004–2005	KSZO Ostrowiec Świętokrzyski	29	(0)
2005–2006	Korona Kielce	0	(0)
2006–2007	Kmita Zabierzów	23	(0)

Managerial career
- Michałowianka Michałowice (goalkeeping coach)
- Świt Krzeszowice (goalkeeping coach)
- 2011–2012: Garbarnia Kraków (goalkeeping coach)
- * Club domestic league appearances and goals

Artur Sarnat (20 September 1970 – 17 November 2024) was a Polish professional footballer who played as a goalkeeper. Besides Poland, he played in Turkey.

== Career ==
Sarnat began his football journey at Wawel Kraków. Over the course of his career, he played 181 matches in the top tier of Polish football, representing Wisła Kraków and Polonia Warsaw. While at Wisła, he participated in European competitions between 1998 and 2001, featuring in matches against prominent teams such as Parma, FC Porto, Barcelona, and Inter Milan. He also played for the Turkish club Diyarbakırspor but left due to the club's failure to fulfill its financial obligations. His playing career concluded at Kmita Zabierzów after the autumn half of the 2007–08 season.

On 1 July 2011, he took up the position of goalkeeper coach at Garbarnia Kraków.

== Death ==
Sarnat died on 17 November 2024, at the age of 54. He was buried on 21 November 2024 at the cemetery in Michałowice, near Kraków.

== Honours ==
Wisła Kraków

- Ekstraklasa: 1998–99, 2000–01
- Polish Cup: 2001–02
- Polish League Cup: 2000–01
- Polish Super Cup: 2001
