= Olgierd Moskalewicz =

Polish footballer

Personal information
- Full name: Olgierd Robert Moskalewicz
- Date of birth: 16 February 1974 (age 52)
- Place of birth: Połczyn Zdrój, Poland
- Height: 1.80 m (5 ft 11 in)
- Position: Midfielder

Senior career*
Years	Team	Apps	(Gls)
1990–1991	Spójnia Świdwin	?	(?)
1991–1998	Pogoń Szczecin	162	(38)
1999–2001	Wisła Kraków	72	(23)
2001	Diyarbakırspor	2	(0)
2002	RKS Radomsko	11	(1)
2002–2003	Zagłębie Lubin	19	(3)
2003–2004	Pogoń Szczecin	37	(9)
2005	AEL Limassol	5	(0)
2005–2009	Arka Gdynia	79	(23)
2009–2011	Pogoń Szczecin	48	(17)

International career
2000	Poland	1	(0)
- * Club domestic league appearances and goals

Olgierd Robert Moskalewicz (born 16 February 1974) is a Polish former professional footballer who played as a midfielder.

== Career ==
=== Club ===
In 2001, he had a brief spell with Diyarbakırspor in the Turkish Süper Lig, appearing in two league matches.

=== National team ===
Moskalewicz made one appearance for the Poland national team against Iceland in 2000.

== Honours ==
Wisła Kraków

- Ekstraklasa: 1998–99, 2000–01
- Polish Cup: 2001–02
- Polish League Cup: 2000–01
- Polish Super Cup: 2001

Pogoń Szczecin

- II liga: 2003–04
