= Grzegorz Kaliciak (footballer) =

Polish footballer

Personal information
- Full name: Grzegorz Paweł Kaliciak
- Date of birth: 10 March 1975 (age 51)
- Place of birth: Kędzierzyn-Koźle, Poland
- Height: 1.92 m (6 ft 3 1/2 in)
- Position: Defender

Youth career
- 1986–1991: Chemik Kędzierzyn-Koźle

Senior career*
Years	Team	Apps	(Gls)
1991–1992	Chemik Kędzierzyn-Koźle		
1992–1996	Wisła Kraków	97	(32)
1996–1997	Sint-Truidense	28	(5)
1998–2003	Wisła Kraków	79	(6)
2000–2001	→ Pogoń Szczecin (loan)	22	(2)
2003–2004	Świt Nowy Dwór Mazowiecki	14	(1)
2004–2005	Szczakowianka Jaworzno	7	(1)
2005	Garbarnia Kraków		
2006–2007	Kmita Zabierzów		
2007	Zagłębie Sosnowiec	13	(0)
2008–2009	Orzeł Balin		
2010–2012	Start Bogdanowice	57	(9)
2013	LZS Walce		

International career
1996–1999	Poland	3	(0)

Managerial career
- 2021–2022: Polonia Głubczyce
- * Club domestic league appearances and goals

Grzegorz Paweł Kaliciak (born 10 March 1975) is a Polish football manager and former player who played as a defender.

== Honours ==
Wisła Kraków

- Ekstraklasa: 1998–99, 2002–03
- Polish Cup: 2001–02, 2002–03
