= Maciej Żurawski (footballer, born 1976) =

Polish footballer

Personal information
- Full name: Maciej Stanisław Żurawski
- Date of birth: 12 September 1976 (age 50)
- Place of birth: Poznań, Polish People's Republic
- Height: 1.82 m (6 ft 0 in)
- Position: Forward

Youth career
- 1982–1994: Warta Poznań

Senior career*
Years	Team	Apps	(Gls)
1994–1997	Warta Poznań	59	(5)
1997–1999	Lech Poznań	56	(19)
1999–2005	Wisła Kraków	153	(101)
2005–2008	Celtic	55	(22)
2008–2009	AEL	38	(15)
2009–2010	Omonia Nicosia	23	(8)
2010–2011	Wisła Kraków	21	(1)
2014–2015	Poroniec Poronin	32	(21)
Total		437	(192)

International career
1998–2008	Poland	72	(17)
- * Club domestic league appearances and goals

Maciej Stanisław Żurawski (Polish pronunciation: [ˈmatɕɛj ʐuˈrafski]; born 12 September 1976) is a Polish former professional footballer who played as a forward.

Żurawski appeared 72 times and scored 17 goals for Poland, representing them at two World Cups and Euro 2008. He also scored 121 goals in the Polish Ekstraklasa (11th most in history) and was the top league goalscorer twice. He also played in Scotland, Greece and Cyprus. In 2002, he was chosen the Polish Footballer of the Year.

== Club career ==
=== Warta Poznań ===
Born in Poznań, Żurawski started his career as a youth at Warta Poznań, the club where his father Andrzej was one of the football coaches. He made his debut for Warta Poznań in Ekstraklasa on 31 July 1994 in a league match against Widzew Łódź, at the age of 17. At the end of his first season, Warta was relegated from the Ekstraklasa.

=== Lech Poznań ===
In November 1997, Żurawski went to Lech Poznań on a six-month loan. The loan was extended and, finally, he moved to Lech Poznań on a permanent transfer. Żurawski scored his first Ekstraklasa goal on 29 March 1998 against Górnik Zabrze. In his last game for Lech, on 26 September 1999, he scored two goals against his new club Wisła Kraków. When leaving Lech, he gave autographed cards to fans with the dedication 'Remember Żuraw, the boy who left his heart in Poznań'.

=== Wisła Kraków ===
Żurawski made his debut for Wisła Kraków in Ekstraklasa on 2 November 1999 in a match against ŁKS Łódź. On 4 March 2000, he scored his first goal for Wisla in the Ekstraklasa in a match against Odra Wodzisław. He won the Ekstraklasa championship in 2000–01 season with Wisła Kraków. In 2001–02 season, Żurawski scored 21 goals in 27 matches and was the Ekstraklasa top goalscorer. In 2002–03 season Żurawski played very well in UEFA Cup, where he scored ten goals in ten matches, including seven goals in matches against Parma, Schalke 04 and Lazio. When Kamil Kosowski left Wisła Kraków, Żurawski has been chosen new Wisła Kraków captain. In 2003–04 season Żurawski scored 20 goals in 26 matches and led Wisła Kraków to achieve the Ekstraklasa title. He was the Ekstraklasa top goalscorer in 2003–04 season. In 2004–05 he won his fourth Ekstraklasa title with Wisła Kraków. In this season he scored 24 goals in 25 matches for Wisła in Ekstraklasa.

=== Celtic ===
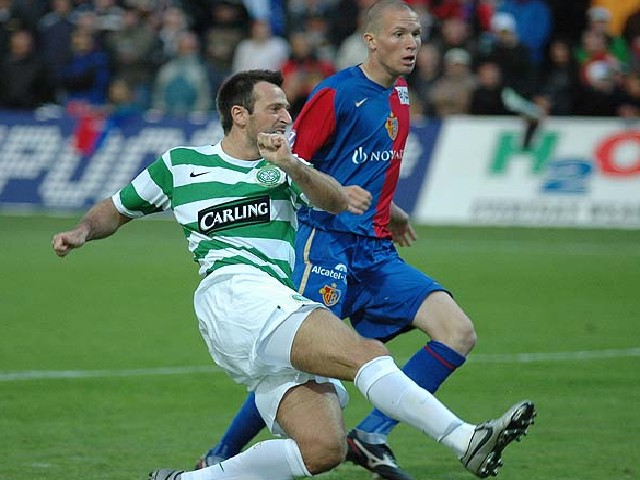
Żurawski playing for Celtic against Basel in July 2007

He joined Scottish Premier League side Celtic from Wisła Kraków in July 2005 and signed a three-year contract. He inherited the number 7 shirt from Juninho Paulista (previously with Henrik Larsson), and was nicknamed "Magic Żurawski" by the fans.

On 19 February 2006, Żurawski scored four goals as Celtic set a new SPL record by beating Dunfermline Athletic 8–1 at East End Park. Żurawski was subsequently voted the SPL Player of the Month for February. Zurawski finished Celtic's joint top scorer in the 2005–06 season along with John Hartson with 20 goals each.

For the 2006–07 season, Celtic signed strikers Kenny Miller and Jan Vennegoor of Hesselink as replacements for Hartson and Dion Dublin. Żurawski formed decent strike partnerships with both players. Having made a good start to the season, notching up 10 goals by January 2007, Żurawski then suffered an injury that kept him out for most of the season and scored no further goals during the campaign.

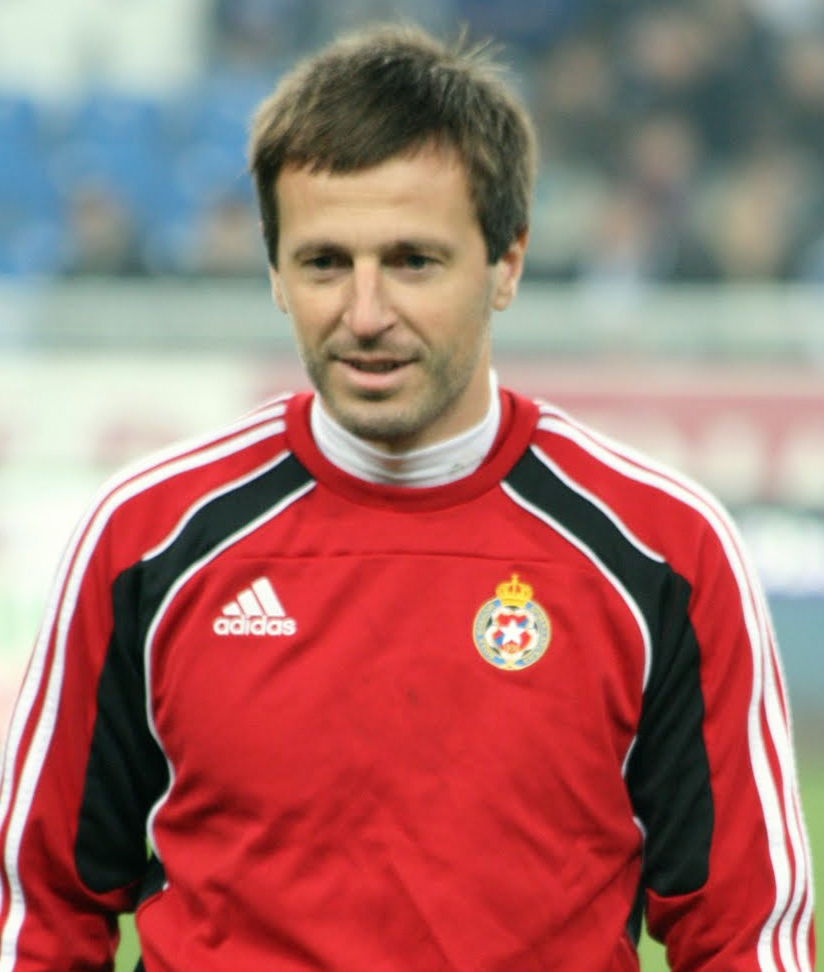
Żurawski with Wisła Kraków

Chris Killen and Scott McDonald were signed before the start of season 2007–08. Żurawski started Celtic's opening day clash with Kilmarnock at Celtic Park, but fell down the pecking order after McDonald returned from suspension and Killen came back from injury. The only other impact Żurawski made during the season was scoring the winning penalty in a Champions League penalty shootout against Spartak Moscow. His time at Celtic was ultimately over after the signing of Georgios Samaras in January 2008.

=== AEL ===
On the deadline day of the 2008 winter transfer window he was signed by the Greek side AEL for £500,000. He scored a goal in his Greek league debut, the only goal of the game to defeat AEK Athens 1–0. Żurawski was Larissa's top scorer for 2008–09 season with nine goals.

=== Omonia Nicosia ===
On 2 June 2009, it was announced that Żurawski had signed for Cypriot League runners-up Omonia Nicosia. He played for Omonia for one year and helped the team to return to titles after five years. He was released in May 2010.

=== Wisła Kraków ===
On 30 June 2010, Żurawski returned to Wisła Kraków after five years, on a one-year deal. In the 2010–11 season he won his fifth Ekstraklasa title with Wisła.

== International career ==
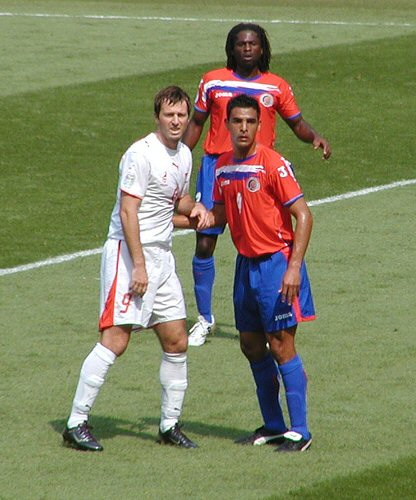
Żurawski in a match against Costa Rica in 2006 FIFA World Cup

=== World Cup 2002 ===
Żurawski was selected in the Poland national team's 23-man squad for the 2002 FIFA World Cup finals in South Korea and Japan. He played in all three of the team's games and missed a penalty in the match against the United States, although Poland won 3–1.

=== World Cup 2006 ===
He was selected in the 23-man Polish squad for the 2006 FIFA World Cup finals in Germany. His side finished third in the group and were eliminated at the first hurdle, losing to hosts Germany and a determined Ecuador before defeating Costa Rica. Zurawski did not score in any of the three matches.

=== Euro 2008 ===
Zurawski was named as Captain in Poland's Euro 2008 squad, starting their first game against Germany on 8 June but later got injured and was substituted at half time. This injury meant that he would miss the rest of the tournament and the captaincy was given to Jacek Bąk and Michał Żewłakow for the second and third group stage matches.

== Career statistics ==
=== Club ===
Appearances and goals by club, season and competition
Club	Season	League			National cup (Note: Includes Polish Cup, Scottish Cup, Greek Cup, Cypriot Cup)		Europe		Other		Total	
Club	Season	Division	Apps	Goals	Apps	Goals	Apps	Goals	Apps	Goals	Apps	Goals
Warta Poznań	1994–95	Ekstraklasa	21	0	0	0	—		—		21	0
Warta Poznań	1995–96	II liga	22	1	0	0	—		—		22	1
Warta Poznań	1996–97	III liga			2	0	—		—		2	0
Warta Poznań	1997–98	I liga	16	4	—		—		—		16	4
Warta Poznań	Total		59	5	2	0	0	0	0	0	61	5
Lech Poznań	1997–98	Ekstraklasa	17	2	1	0	—		—		18	2
Lech Poznań	1998–99	Ekstraklasa	30	11	1	0	—		—		31	11
Lech Poznań	1999–2000	Ekstraklasa	9	6	0	0	4 (Note: Appearances in UEFA Cup)	2	1 (Note: Appearance(s) in Polish League Cup)	0	14	8
Lech Poznań	Total		56	19	2	0	4	2	1	0	63	21
Wisła Kraków	1999–2000	Ekstraklasa	20	6	7	2	—		—		27	8
Wisła Kraków	2000–01	Ekstraklasa	27	8	1	0	6	0	6	3	40	11
Wisła Kraków	2001–02	Ekstraklasa	27	21	6	6	8 (Note: Four appearances and two goals in UEFA Champions League, four appearances and two goals in UEFA Cup)	4	2 (Note: One appearance in Polish League Cup, one appearance and one goal in Polish Super Cup)	1	43	32
Wisła Kraków	2002–03	Ekstraklasa	28	22	7	6	10	10	—		45	38
Wisła Kraków	2003–04	Ekstraklasa	26	20	1	0	8 (Note: Four appearances and five goals in UEFA Champions League, four appearances in UEFA Cup)	5	—		35	25
Wisła Kraków	2004–05	Ekstraklasa	25	24	11	6	5 (Note: Three appearances and two goals in UEFA Champions League, two appearances and one goal in UEFA Cup)	3	—		41	33
Wisła Kraków	Total		153	101	33	20	37	22	8	4	241	147
Celtic	2005–06	Scottish Premier League	24	16	4	4	2 (Note: Appearances in UEFA Champions League)	0	—		30	20
Celtic	2006–07	Scottish Premier League	26	6	3	4	5	0	—		34	10
Celtic	2007–08	Scottish Premier League	5	0	0	0	3	0	—		8	0
Celtic	Total		55	22	7	8	10	0	0	0	72	30
AEL	2007–08	Super League Greece	11	6	1	0	—		—		12	6
AEL	2008–09	Super League Greece	31	9	2	0	—		—		33	9
AEL	Total		42	15	3	0	—		—		45	15
Omonia	2009–10	A Katigoria	23	8	4	2	3 (Note: Appearances in UEFA Europa League)	2	—		30	12
Wisła Kraków	2010–11	Ekstraklasa	21	1	3	1	4	1	—		28	3
Poroniec Poronin	2013–14	III liga, group G	2	2	—		—		—		2	2
Poroniec Poronin	2014–15	III liga, group G	20	14	—		—		—		20	14
Poroniec Poronin	2015–16	III liga, group G	10	5	—		—		—		10	5
Poroniec Poronin	Total		32	21	—		—		—		32	21
Career total			441	192	54	31	58	27	9	4	562	254

=== International ===
Appearances and goals by national team and year
National team	Year	Apps	Goals
Poland	1998	1	0
Poland	1999	3	0
Poland	2000	2	0
Poland	2001	1	0
Poland	2002	11	4
Poland	2003	7	1
Poland	2004	12	4
Poland	2005	11	6
Poland	2006	11	0
Poland	2007	8	1
Poland	2008	5	1
Total		72	17

Scores and results list Poland's goal tally first, score column indicates score after each Żurawski goal.

List of international goals scored by Maciej Żurawski
No.	Date	Venue	Opponent	Score	Result	Competition
1	10 February 2002	Tsirio Stadium, Limassol, Cyprus	Faroe Islands	1–0	2–1	Friendly
2	10 February 2002	Tsirio Stadium, Limassol, Cyprus	Faroe Islands	2–1	2–1	Friendly
3	18 May 2002	Polish Army Stadium, Warsaw, Poland	Estonia	1–0	1–0	Friendly
4	21 August 2002	Florian Krygier Stadium, Szczecin, Poland	Belgium	1–0	1–1	Friendly
5	16 November 2003	Kazimierz Górski Stadium, Płock, Poland	Serbia and Montenegro	4–2	4–3	Friendly
6	18 August 2004	Poznań Stadium, Poznań, Poland	Denmark	1–3	1–5	Friendly
7	4 September 2004	Windsor Park, Belfast, Northern Ireland	Northern Ireland	1–0	3–0	2006 FIFA World Cup qualification
8	8 September 2004	Silesian Stadium, Chorzów, Poland	England	1–1	1–2	2006 FIFA World Cup qualification
9	13 October 2004	Millennium Stadium, Cardiff, Wales	Wales	2–1	3–2	2006 FIFA World Cup qualification
10	9 February 2005	Dyskobolia Grodzisk Wielkopolski Stadium, Grodzisk Wielkopolski, Poland	Belarus	1–1	1–3	Friendly
11	30 March 2005	Polish Army Stadium, Warsaw, Poland	Northern Ireland	1–0	1–0	2006 FIFA World Cup qualification
12	29 May 2005	Florian Krygier Stadium, Szczecin, Poland	Albania	1–0	1–0	Friendly
13	4 June 2005	Tofiq Bahramov Republican Stadium, Baku, Azerbaijan	Azerbaijan	3–0	3–0	2006 FIFA World Cup qualification
14	3 September 2005	Silesian Stadium, Chorzów, Poland	Austria	3–1	3–2	2006 FIFA World Cup qualification
15	7 September 2005	Polish Army Stadium, Warsaw, Poland	Wales	1–0	1–0	2006 FIFA World Cup qualification
16	28 March 2007	Stadion Miejski, Kielce, Poland	Armenia	1–0	1–0	UEFA Euro 2008 qualifying
17	27 May 2008	Stadion an der Kreuzeiche, Reutlingen, Germany	Albania	1–0	1–0	Friendly

== Honours ==
Wisła Kraków

- Ekstraklasa: 2000–01, 2002–03, 2003–04, 2004–05, 2010–11
- Polish Cup: 2001–02, 2002–03
- Polish League Cup: 2000–01
- Polish Super Cup: 2001

Celtic

- Scottish Premier League: 2005–06, 2006–07, 2007–08
- Scottish Cup: 2006–07
- Scottish League Cup: 2005–06

Omonia

- Cypriot First Division: 2009–10

Individual

- Ekstraklasa top goalscorer: 2001–02, 2003–04
- Polish Cup top scorer: 2002–03
- Piłka Nożna Polish Footballer of the Year: 2002
- Football Oscar "Footballer of the Year": 2002
- Ekstraklasa Footballer of the Year: 2001, 2002
- Ekstraklasa Striker of the Year: 2003
- SPL Player of the Month: February 2006
