= Kazimierz Moskal (footballer) =

Polish footballer and coach

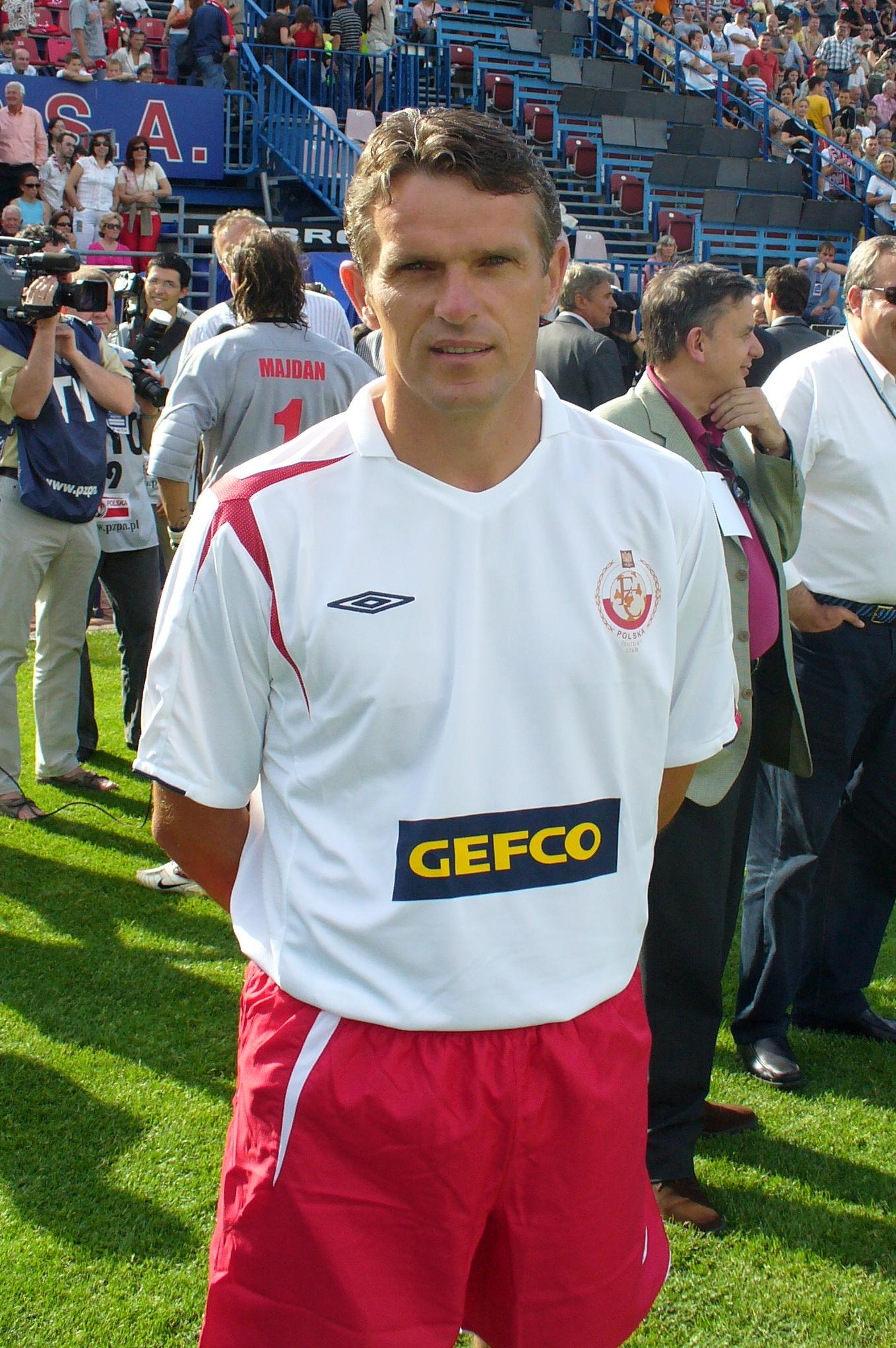
- Moskal during a charity match in 2007

Personal information
- Date of birth: 9 January 1967 (age 59)
- Place of birth: Sułkowice, Poland
- Height: 1.82 m (6 ft 0 in)
- Positions: Midfielder; defender

Youth career
- –1982: Gościbia Sułkowice
- 1982–1985: Wisła Kraków

Senior career*
Years	Team	Apps	(Gls)
1985–1990	Wisła Kraków	135	(40)
1990–1994	Lech Poznań	123	(20)
1994–1997	Hapoel Tel Aviv	90	(14)
1998	Maccabi Ironi Ashdod	15	(0)
1998–1999	Hutnik Kraków	34	(2)
1999–2003	Wisła Kraków	84	(5)
2003–2004	Górnik Zabrze	17	(0)
2007–2008	Bolesław Bukowno		
2009	Płomień Jerzmanowice		
Total		498	(81)

International career
1990–1994	Poland	6	(1)

Managerial career
- 2007: Wisła Kraków
- 2007: Wisła Kraków II
- 2008–2010: Wisła Kraków (youth)
- 2011–2012: Wisła Kraków
- 2012–2013: Termalica Bruk-Bet
- 2013–2014: GKS Katowice
- 2015: Wisła Kraków
- 2016–2017: Pogoń Szczecin
- 2017–2018: Sandecja Nowy Sącz
- 2018–2020: ŁKS Łódź
- 2020–2021: Zagłębie Sosnowiec
- 2022–2023: ŁKS Łódź
- 2024: Wisła Kraków
- 2025–2026: Wieczysta Kraków
- * Club domestic league appearances and goals

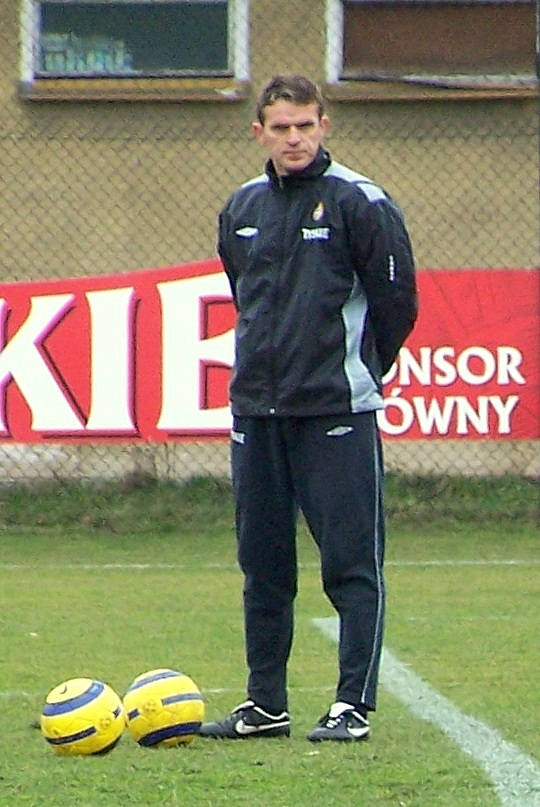
Moskal in 2007

Kazimierz Moskal (Polish pronunciation: [kaˈʑimjɛʂ ˈmɔskal]; born 9 January 1967) is a Polish professional football manager and former player who was most recently in charge of Ekstraklasa club Wieczysta Kraków.

== Club career ==
In addition to Polish clubs, including Lech Poznań and Wisła Kraków, where he won trophies, he also played in Israel.

== International career ==
Moskal made six appearances for the Poland national team, scoring one goal.

== Personal life ==
Moskal has two sons, Dawid and Kamil, the latter of whom also became a footballer.

== Career statistics ==
=== International ===
Appearances and goals by national team and year
National team	Year	Apps	Goals
Poland
Poland	1990	2	0
Poland	1991	1	0
Poland	1994	3	1
Total		6	1

Scores and results list Poland's goal tally first, score column indicates score after each Moskal goal.

List of international goals scored by Kazimierz Moskal
No.	Date	Venue	Opponent	Score	Result	Competition
1	17 May 1994	GKS Katowice Stadium, Katowice, Poland	Austria	3–4	3–4	Friendly

== Managerial statistics ==
As of match played 21 August 2026

Managerial record by team and tenure
Team	From	To	Record							
Team	From	To	G	W	D	L	GF	GA	GD	Win %
Wisła Kraków	16 April 2007	12 June 2007	13	4	5	4	13	16	−3	30.77
Wisła Kraków	7 November 2011	1 March 2012	10	4	3	3	9	8	+1	40.00
Termalica Bruk-Bet	14 June 2012	12 June 2013	35	19	6	10	53	31	+22	54.29
GKS Katowice	25 August 2013	27 October 2014	45	15	14	16	63	61	+2	33.33
Wisła Kraków	10 March 2015	30 November 2015	32	8	16	8	49	36	+13	25.00
Pogoń Szczecin	24 May 2016	30 June 2017	43	15	13	15	63	60	+3	34.88
Sandecja Nowy Sącz	19 December 2017	5 June 2018	16	2	6	8	14	24	−10	12.50
ŁKS Łódź	13 June 2018	2 May 2020	64	27	14	23	88	70	+18	42.19
Zagłębie Sosnowiec	9 November 2020	7 August 2021	31	7	7	17	35	42	−7	22.58
ŁKS Łódź	12 June 2022	11 December 2023	47	22	11	14	69	59	+10	46.81
Wisła Kraków	4 June 2024	23 September 2024	15	5	3	7	23	30	−7	33.33
Wieczysta Kraków	24 November 2025	22 August 2026	23	12	4	7	48	34	+14	52.17
Career total			374	140	102	132	527	471	+56	37.43

== Honours ==
=== As player ===
Lech Poznań

- Ekstraklasa: 1991–92, 1992–93
- Polish Super Cup: 1990, 1992

Wisła Kraków

- Ekstraklasa: 2000–01, 2002–03
- Polish Cup: 2001–02, 2002–03
- Polish League Cup: 2000–01
- Polish Super Cup: 2001

=== As manager ===
ŁKS Łódź

- I liga: 2022–23
