= Arkadiusz Miklosik =

Polish footballer

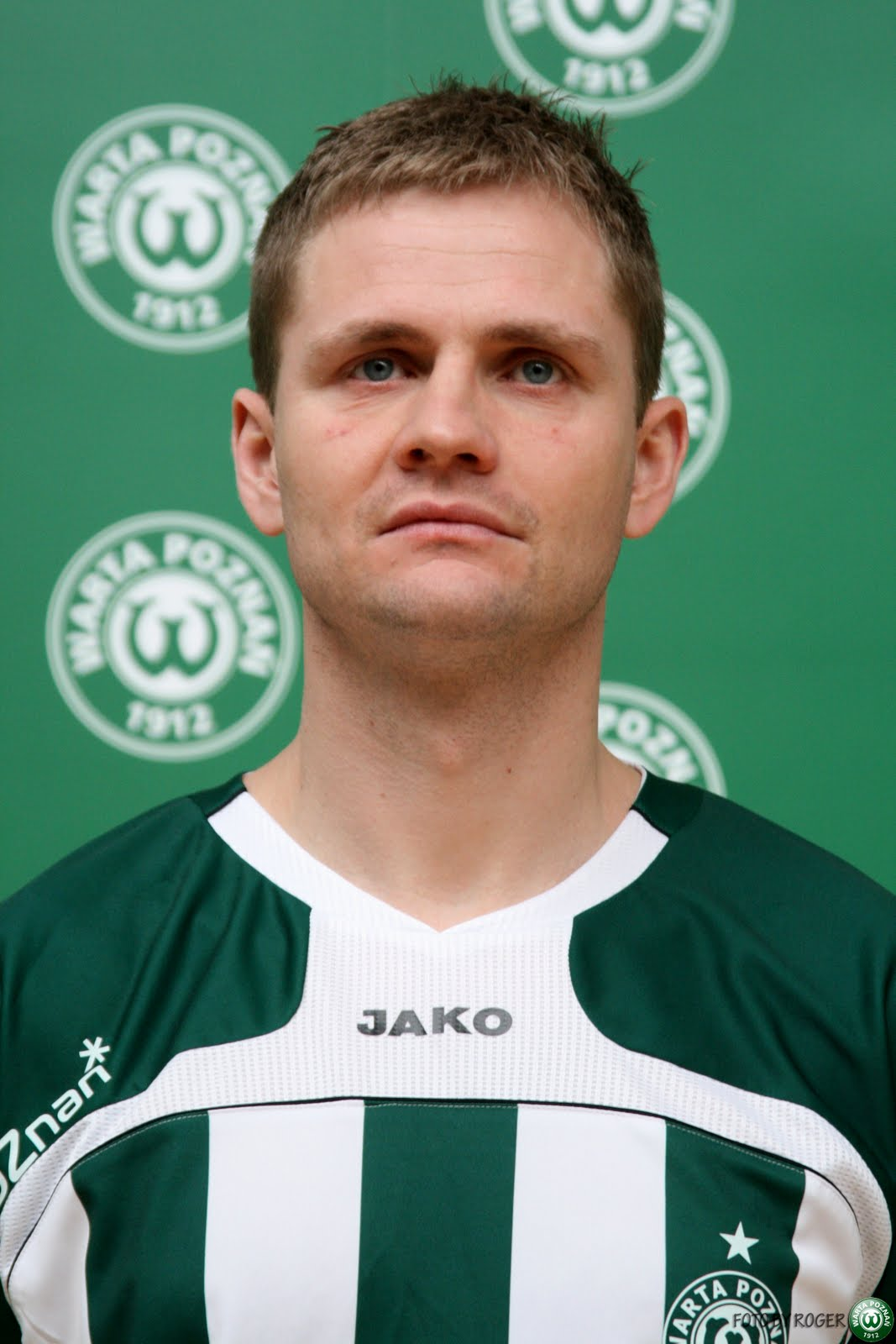

Personal information
- Date of birth: 7 September 1975 (age 51)
- Place of birth: Poznań, Poland
- Height: 1.78 m (5 ft 10 in)
- Position: Midfielder

Team information
- Current team: Lech Poznań U19 (assistant); Poland U20 (assistant)

Senior career*
| Years | Team | Apps | (Gls) |
| 1994–2000 | Warta Poznań | | |
| 2000–2003 | Lech Poznań | | |
| 2003 | Ceramika Opoczno | 15 | (2) |
| 2003–2004 | Stasiak Opoczno | 25 | (1) |
| 2004–2005 | KSZO Ostrowiec | 25 | (2) |
| 2005–2007 | Zawisza Bydgoszcz (2) | 44 | (6) |
| 2007–2009 | Lechia Gdańsk | 43 | (1) |
| 2009–2011 | Warta Poznań | 36 | (1) |
| 2013 | Fogo Luboń | 2 | (0) |
- * Club domestic league appearances and goals

Arkadiusz Miklosik (born 7 September 1975) is a Polish former professional footballer. He is the current assistant coach of Lech Poznań's under-19 team and the Poland U20 national team. He formerly served as the sporting director of Warta Poznań.

== Career ==
He announced his retirement on 22 June 2011.

== Honours ==
Lech Poznań

- II liga: 2001–02

Lechia Gdańsk

- II liga: 2007–08
