= Marcin Kaczmarek (footballer, born 1979) =

Polish footballer (born 1979)

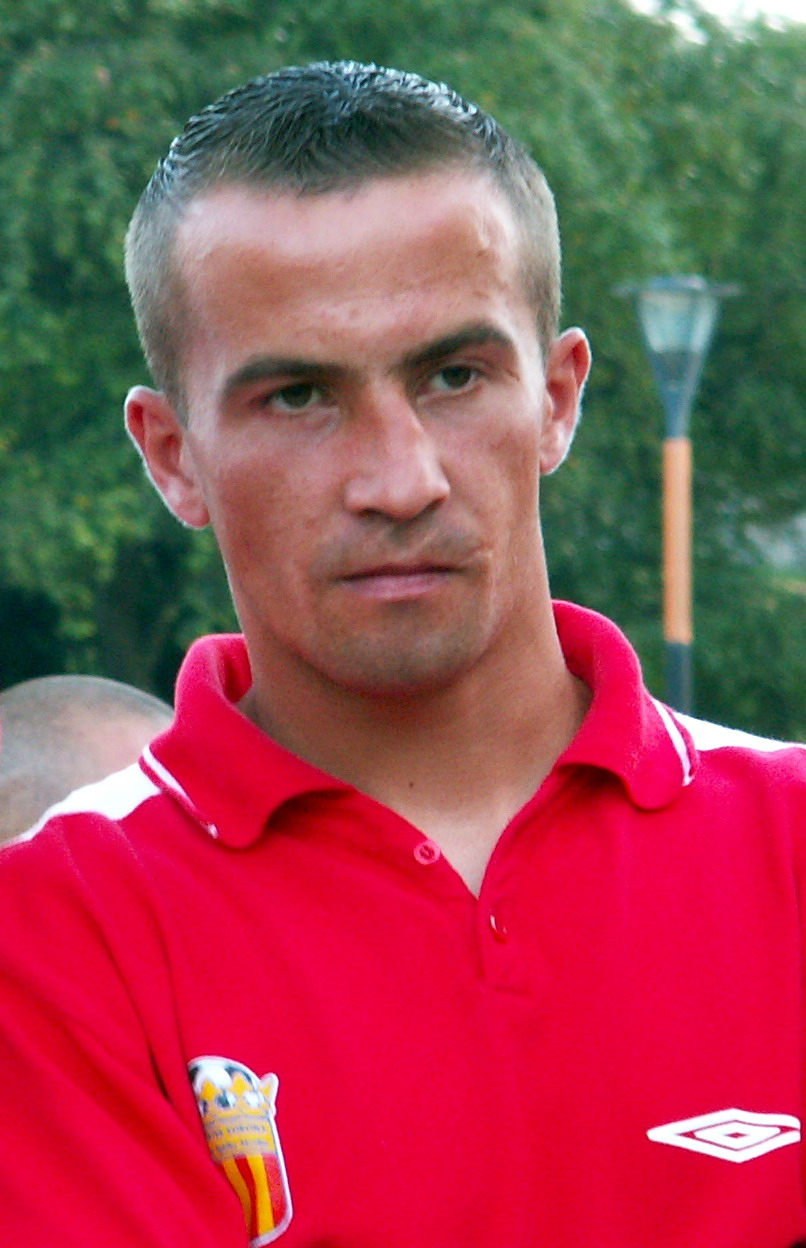
- Kaczmarek with Korona Kielce in 2006

Personal information
- Date of birth: 3 December 1979 (age 46)
- Place of birth: Sieradz, Poland
- Height: 1.70 m (5 ft 7 in)
- Position: Midfielder

Senior career*
| Years | Team | Apps | (Gls) |
- Piast Błaszki
| 1999–2000 | KKS Kalisz | | |
| 2001 | Włókniarz Konst. Ł. | | |
| 2001–2002 | KKS Kalisz | | |
| 2002–2003 | Ceramika Opoczno | 26 | (2) |
| 2003–2004 | Stasiak Opoczno | 28 | (4) |
| 2004–2005 | KSZO Ostrowiec | 30 | (10) |
| 2005–2008 | Korona Kielce | 71 | (5) |
| 2008–2010 | Lechia Gdańsk | 59 | (3) |
| 2011 | ŁKS Łódź | 28 | (0) |
| 2012–2014 | Widzew Łódź | 76 | (5) |
| 2014–2019 | Olimpia Grudziądz | 139 | (23) |
| 2019–2021 | KSZO Ostrowiec | 42 | (2) |
| 2021–2023 | Star Starachowice | 14 | (2) |
| 2023–2024 | Łysica Bodzentyn | 10 | (1) |
| 2024 | Wisła Sandomierz | 14 | (1) |
| 2024–2025 | Sparta Dwikozy | 19 | (3) |

International career
| 2005 | Poland | 2 | (0) |
- * Club domestic league appearances and goals as of 11:00, 21 June 2025 (UTC)

Marcin Kaczmarek (born 3 December 1979) is a Polish professional footballer who plays as a midfielder.

== Club career ==
In August 2008, Kaczmarek joined Lechia Gdańsk on a three-year contract.

In February 2011, he signed a contract with ŁKS Łódź.

On 8 June 2019, 39-year old Kaczmarek joined KSZO Ostrowiec Świętokrzyski.

== International career ==
Kaczmarek earned two caps for the Poland national team. His debut took place in the game against Iceland in Warsaw on 7 September 2005.

== Career statistics ==
=== International ===
Appearances and goals by national team and year
| National team | Year | Apps | Goals |
|---|---|---|---|
Poland
| Poland | 2005 | 2 | 0 |
| Total | | 2 | 0 |

== Honours ==
ŁKS Łódź

- I liga: 2010–11

KSZO Ostrowiec Świętokrzyski

- Polish Cup (Świętokrzyskie regionals): 2019–20, 2020–21

Star Starachowice

- IV liga Świętokrzyskie: 2022–23
