= Tomasz Sokołowski (footballer, born 1970) =

Polish footballer

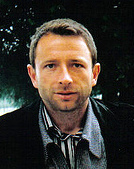

Personal information
- Date of birth: 21 September 1970 (age 56)
- Place of birth: Gdynia, Poland
- Height: 1.77 m (5 ft 10 in)
- Position: Midfielder

Youth career
- 1980–1990: MOSiR Pruszcz Gdański

Senior career*
Years	Team	Apps	(Gls)
1990	MOSiR Pruszcz Gdański		
1991	Łyna Sępopol		
1992–1995	Stomil Olsztyn		
1996–2001	Legia Warsaw	135	(11)
2001	Maccabi Netanya		
2001–2005	Legia Warsaw	78	(10)
2005–2006	Górnik Łęczna	22	(0)
2006–2008	Ruch Chorzów	42	(6)
2008	Jagiellonia Białystok	8	(0)
2009–2010	UKS Łady		

International career
1994–1998	Poland	12	(1)

Managerial career
- 2015–2016: Sokół Ostróda
- 2016–2018: Mazowsze Grójec
- 2019–2021: Drukarz Warsaw
- 2021–2022: Mazur Karczew
- 2022–2023: Marcovia Marki
- * Club domestic league appearances and goals

Tomasz Sokołowski (born 21 September 1970) is a Polish professional football manager and former player who played as a midfielder.

== Career ==
Sokołowski began his senior career with MOSiR Pruszcz Gdański in the fall of 1990 upon completing high school, after spending ten years with the club as a youth player. He then moved on to Łyna Sępopol in 1991. In 1992, he transferred to Stomil Olsztyn and helped them advance to the Ekstraklasa in 1994.

In 1996, he joined Legia Warsaw. He made his debut for Legia in a Champions League quarterfinal against Panathinaikos on 8 March 1996. He stayed with the club for almost a decade, with an exception for a brief stint at Maccabi Netanya in 2001. While at Legia, he won the Polish championship in 2002, as well as the Polish Cup and Super Cup in 1997.

In the summer of 2005, he moved to Górnik Łęczna and made 23 appearances in all competitions across the 2005–06 season. Before the start of the following campaign, he transferred to second division club Ruch Chorzów and helped them advance to the top division. He finished his professional career with Jagiellonia Białystok in 2008.

He has appeared in 12 games for Poland and scored one goal.

== Honours ==
Legia Warsaw

- Ekstraklasa: 2001–02
- Polish Cup: 1996–97
- Polish Super Cup: 1997
- Polish League Cup: 2001–02

Ruch Chorzów

- II liga: 2006–07
