= Grzegorz Kaliciak =

Grzegorz Kaliciak may refer to:

- Grzegorz Kaliciak (footballer), Polish football manager and former player
- Grzegorz Kaliciak (officer), Polish Armed Forces colonel
