= Janusz Jojko =

Polish footballer and coach

Personal information
- Date of birth: 20 April 1960 (age 66)
- Place of birth: Chorzów, Poland
- Height: 1.83 m (6 ft 0 in)
- Position: Goalkeeper

Team information
- Current team: KSZO Ostrowiec (goalkeeping coach)

Youth career
- 1977–1979: Chorzowianka Chorzów

Senior career*
Years	Team	Apps	(Gls)
1980–1987	Ruch Chorzów	117	(0)
1988–1997	GKS Katowice	276	(0)
1997–2003	KSZO Ostrowiec	24	(0)
2004	Stasiak Opoczno	0	(0)
2004–2006	KSZO Ostrowiec	0	(0)
2006	Polvat Szwarszowice		
2006–2009	KSZO Ostrowiec	0	(0)

International career
1987–1994	Poland	2	(0)

Managerial career
- 2004: KSZO Ostrowiec (goalkeeping coach)
- 2004–2005: KSZO Ostrowiec
- 2005–2009: KSZO Ostrowiec (goalkeeping coach)
- 2006: KSZO Ostrowiec (caretaker)
- 2007: KSZO Ostrowiec (caretaker)
- 2008: KSZO Ostrowiec (president)
- 2008: KSZO Ostrowiec (caretaker)
- 2009–2010: KSZO Ostrowiec (president)
- 2011–2018: GKS Katowice (goalkeeping coach)
- 2014: GKS Katowice (caretaker)
- 2015: GKS Katowice (caretaker)
- 2017: GKS Katowice (caretaker)
- 2020–: KSZO Ostrowiec (goalkeeping coach)
- 2020: KSZO Ostrowiec (caretaker)
- * Club domestic league appearances and goals

Janusz Andrzej Jojko (born 20 April 1960) is a Polish football manager and former professional player who played as a goalkeeper. He is currently the goalkeeping coach of KSZO Ostrowiec Świętokrzyski.

== Club career ==
Jojko began his professional career with Ruch Chorzów, and played in 117 league matches over eight seasons. During the 1986–87 season, he scored an infamous and bizarre own goal, throwing the ball into his own net in a playout match against Lechia Gdańsk, and never played for the club again.

In 1988, Jojko moved to GKS Katowice where he spent the next ten seasons and amassed 276 league appearances. Following the 1996–97 season, he moved to KSZO Ostrowiec Świętokrzyski where he appeared in another 24 top tier matches.

== International career ==
Jojko made two appearances for the Poland national team, his debut coming in a friendly match against Finland in 1987.

== Honours ==
GKS Katowice

- Polish Cup: 1990–91, 1992–93
- Polish Super Cup: 1991, 1995
