= Cichoń =

Cichoń is a surname. Notable people with the surname include:

- Adam Cichon (born 1975), Polish-born German footballer
- Aleksander Cichoń (born 1958), Polish wrestler
- Jacek Cichoń (born 1953), Polish mathematician
- Przemysław Cichoń (born 1978), Polish footballer
- Thomas Cichon (born 1976), Polish-born German footballer and manager

== See also ==
- Cichoń's diagram, named after Jacek Cichoń
