= Farid Ali =

Farid Ali may refer to:

- Farid Ali (actor) (1945–2016), Bangladeshi actor
- Farid Ali (footballer) (born 1992), Ukrainian footballer
- Farid Ali (singer) (1919–1981), Algerian singer
