= Tomasz Dymanowski =

Polish footballer

Personal information
- Full name: Tomasz Dymanowski
- Date of birth: 12 December 1973 (age 52)
- Place of birth: Sandomierz, Poland
- Height: 1.87 m (6 ft 1 1/2 in)
- Position: Goalkeeper

Youth career
- Świt Ćmielów

Senior career*
Years	Team	Apps	(Gls)
1991–1992	KSZO Ostrowiec		
1992–1994	Sokół Pniewy		
1995	KSZO Ostrowiec		
1996	Sokół Tychy	0	(0)
1996–1997	KSZO Ostrowiec	1	(0)
1998	Alit Ożarów		
1998–1999	KSZO Ostrowiec		
2000	Hetman Zamość		
2000–2002	Stal Stalowa Wola		
2002–2003	KSZO Ostrowiec	32	(0)
2004	Stasiak Opoczno	7	(0)
2004–2005	KSZO Ostrowiec	5	(0)
2005	Stal Rzeszów		
2006	Powiślanka Lipsko		
2006–2007	Wisła Sandomierz		
2007–2011	KSZO Ostrowiec	28	(0)
2011–2016	Łysica Bodzentyn	152	(0)
2016–2019	Kamienna Brody		
2020–2022	Świt Ćmielów	49	(0)
2023	Łysica Bodzentyn	1	(0)
2024	Wisła Sandomierz	0	(0)
2024	Oldboys KSZO Ostrowiec		
- * Club domestic league appearances and goals as of 13 November 2024

Tomasz Dymanowski (born 12 December 1973) is a Polish professional footballer who plays as a goalkeeper.

== Honours ==
KSZO Ostrowiec

- II liga East: 2008–09

Kamienna Brody

- Regional league Świętokrzyskie: 2016–17
