= Tomasz Żelazowski =

Polish footballer

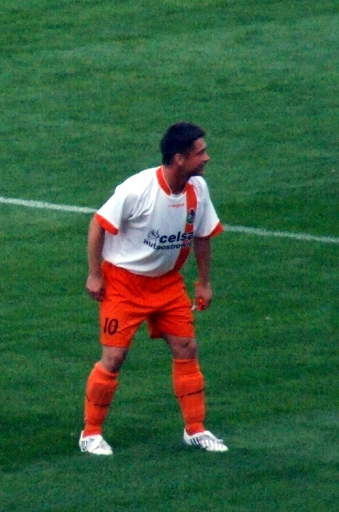

Personal information
- Full name: Tomasz Żelazowski
- Date of birth: 22 September 1974 (age 52)
- Place of birth: Opatów, Poland
- Height: 1.72 m (5 ft 8 in)
- Position: Forward

Senior career*
Years	Team	Apps	(Gls)
–1994	OKS Opatów		
1994–1999	KSZO Ostrowiec		
1999	Korona Kielce		
2000–2003	KSZO Ostrowiec		
2004	RKS Radomsko	23	(5)
2005	KSZO Ostrowiec	13	(0)
2005–2006	Tur Turek		
2006	AEM Mesogis		
2007–2010	KSZO Ostrowiec	45	(3)
2010	Polonia New York SC		
2011	Orlicz Suchedniów	31	(15)
2012	Wisła Sandomierz		
2012–2013	Wisła Annopol		
- * Club domestic league appearances and goals

Tomasz Żelazowski (born 22 September 1974) is a Polish former professional footballer who played as a forward.

== Honours ==
KSZO Ostrowiec

- II liga East: 2008–09
