= Kamil Kosowski =

Polish footballer (born 1977)

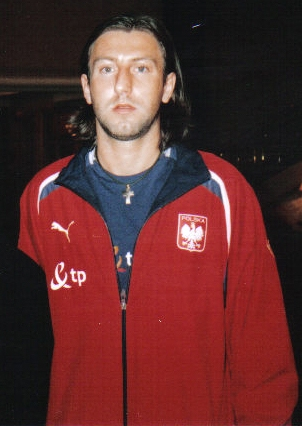
- Kosowski in August 2007

Personal information
- Full name: Kamil Piotr Kosowski
- Date of birth: 30 August 1977 (age 49)
- Place of birth: Ostrowiec Świętokrzyski, Poland
- Height: 1.86 m (6 ft 1 in)
- Position: Midfielder

Youth career
- 1984–1991: KSZO Ostrowiec Świętokrzyski
- 1991–1996: Gwarek Zabrze

Senior career*
Years	Team	Apps	(Gls)
1996–1999	Górnik Zabrze	64	(1)
1999–2008	Wisła Kraków	115	(13)
2003–2005	→ 1. FC Kaiserslautern (loan)	43	(1)
2005–2006	→ Southampton (loan)	18	(1)
2006–2007	→ Chievo (loan)	23	(0)
2008	Cádiz	17	(0)
2008–2010	APOEL	44	(5)
2010–2011	Apollon Limassol	17	(1)
2011–2013	GKS Bełchatów	33	(1)
2013	Wisła Kraków	10	(0)
Total		384	(23)

International career
1998–1999	Poland U21	15	(0)
2001–2009	Poland	52	(4)
- * Club domestic league appearances and goals

Kamil Piotr Kosowski (Polish pronunciation: [ˈkamil kɔˈsɔfski]; born 30 August 1977) is a Polish football pundit, co-commentator and former player who played as a midfielder.

== Club career ==
Born in Ostrowiec Świętokrzyski, Kosowski started out playing for his home town club KSZO Ostrowiec Świętokrzyski.

=== Wisła Kraków and loans ===
Kosowski became renowned in Poland after his performances for Wisła Kraków in the 2002–03 UEFA Cup matches.

He moved to 1. FC Kaiserslautern in Germany in 2003 and then on to Southampton FC where he played the 2005–06 season on a year-long loan and was recalled to the Poland national team. He scored once in the league for Southampton, in a 1–1 draw with Hull City.

After being on loan at A.C. Chievo Verona, Kosowski returned to Wisła Kraków and played very well for the first half of the season as the player with most assists in the first half of the league campaign after setting up nine goals in 13 games. However, on 14 January 2008, Wisła Kraków and Kosowski mutually voided the remainder of his contract as a result of not coming to a compromise on a new deal.

=== Cádiz ===
Kosowski signed a two-and-a-half-year contract with Spanish second division team Cádiz CF on 25 January 2008. Cadiz finished 20th in the Segunda División in 2007–08 and were relegated to the Segunda División B.

=== APOEL ===
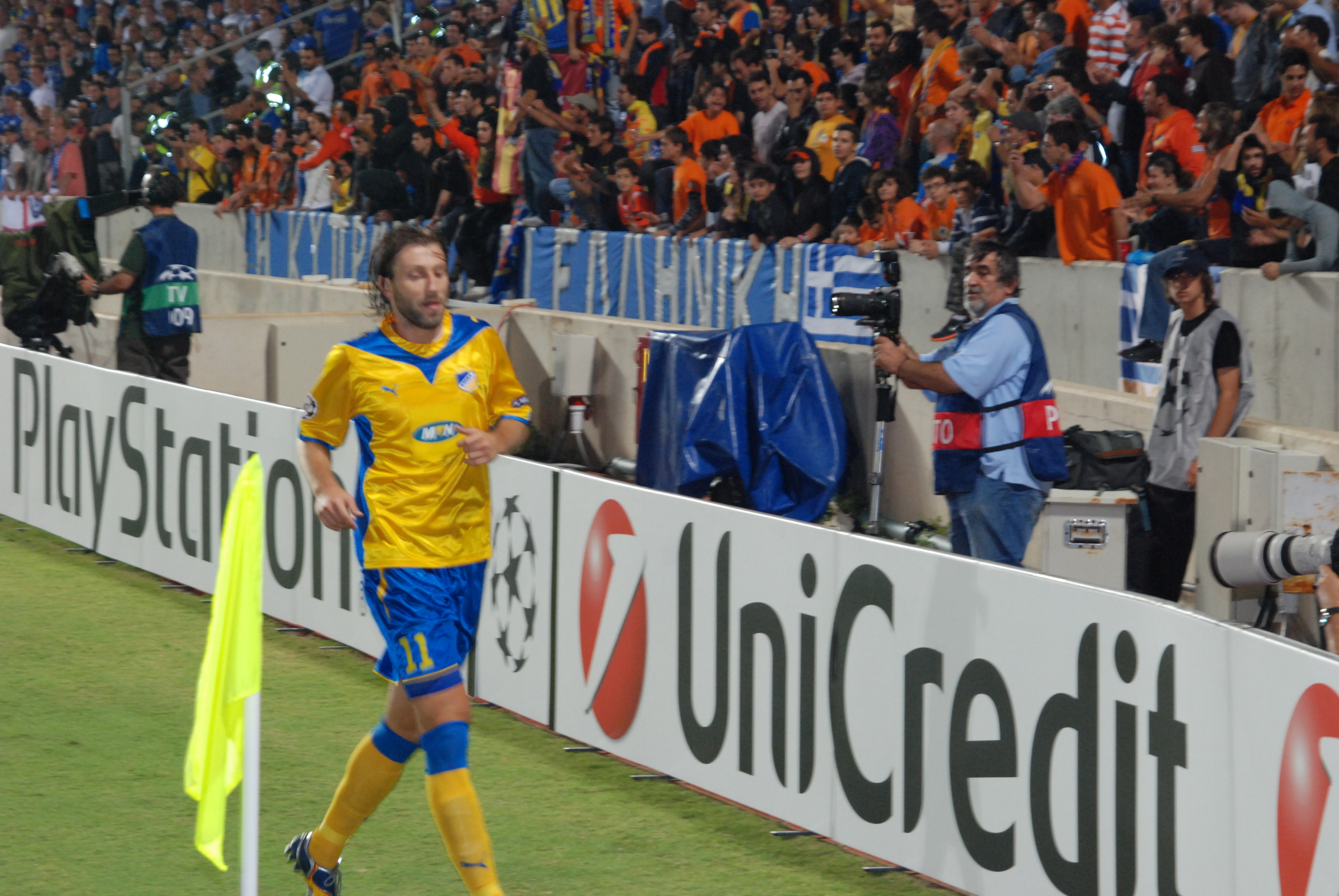
Kosowski playing for APOEL in a UEFA Champions League match against Chelsea

On 7 July 2008, Kosowski was transferred to APOEL from Cádiz CF and signed a two-year contract. In his first official appearance with APOEL, Kosowski scored the only goal in the Super Cup match against Anorthosis and APOEL won the title. In his first year in the club, he helped APOEL to win the Cyprus Championship 2008–09, showing his class and was one of the most valuable players of the club. The next season, he won the Super Cup again and he also appeared in five official group stage matches of the 2009–10 UEFA Champions League with APOEL. He stated that his participation with APOEL in the UEFA Champions League was one of the most important moments in his career.

=== Apollon Limassol ===
On 31 May 2010, he signed a two-year contract with Apollon Limassol but at the end of the season his contract was mutually terminated.

=== GKS Bełchatów ===
In July 2011, he joined GKS Bełchatów on a one-year contract.

== International career ==
Kosowski was capped 52 times for Poland, scoring four goals.

In August 2005 he was part of the national team's triumphant performance at the Valeri Lobanovsky Memorial Tournament 2005.

He was selected to the 23-men national squad for the 2006 FIFA World Cup finals held in Germany, but he played only about 15 minutes against Ecuador.

== Career statistics ==
=== International ===
Appearances and goals by national team and year
National team	Year	Apps	Goals
Poland	2001	1	0
Poland	2002	7	0
Poland	2003	12	2
Poland	2004	9	0
Poland	2005	11	2
Poland	2006	6	0
Poland	2007	4	0
Poland	2009	2	0
Total		52	4

Scores and results list Poland's goal tally first, score column indicates score after each Kosowski goal.

List of international goals scored by Kamil Kosowski
No.	Date	Venue	Opponent	Score	Result	Competition
1	4 April 2003	Ostrowiec Świętokrzyski, Poland	San Marino	2–0	5–0	UEFA Euro 2004 qualifying
2	16 November 2003	Płock, Poland	Serbia and Montenegro	3–1	4–3	Friendly
3	26 March 2005	Warsaw, Poland	Azerbaijan	3–0	8–0	2006 FIFA World Cup qualification
4	3 September 2005	Chorzów, Poland	Austria	2–0	3–2	2006 FIFA World Cup qualification

== Honours ==
Wisła Kraków

- Ekstraklasa: 2000–01, 2002–03, 2007–08
- Polish Cup: 2001–02, 2002–03
- Polish League Cup: 2000–01
- Polish Super Cup: 2001

APOEL

- Cypriot First Division: 2008–09
- Cypriot Super Cup: 2008

== Personal ==
Kamil Kosowski's first wife was Adrianna Kosowska, with whom he had son Aleksander. They divorced in 2003, afterwards he started relationship with Miss Polonia 1997 Roksana Jonek. They have two sons.
