= Maciej Bykowski =

Polish professional footballer

Personal information
- Full name: Maciej Bykowski
- Date of birth: 22 February 1977 (age 49)
- Place of birth: Elbląg, Poland
- Height: 1.77 m (5 ft 10 in)
- Position: Striker

Senior career*
Years	Team	Apps	(Gls)
1995	Polonia Elbląg		
1996	Sokół Tychy	15	(0)
1996	Polonia Elbląg		
1997–1998	Lech Poznań	44	(7)
1998–1999	GKS Bełchatów	23	(4)
1999	OKS 1945 Olsztyn	15	(3)
2000–2002	Polonia Warsaw	69	(17)
2003	Szczakowianka Jaworzno	12	(2)
2003–2004	OFI	24	(3)
2004–2005	Panathinaikos	6	(4)
2005–2006	Górnik Łęczna	26	(4)
2006–2008	Veria	48	(8)
2008–2009	Diagoras	11	(1)
2010	Polonia Bytom	21	(0)
2011–2012	ŁKS Łódź	29	(3)
- * Club domestic league appearances and goals

Maciej Bykowski (born 22 February 1977 in Elbląg) is a Polish former professional footballer.

== Honours ==
Polonia Warsaw

- Ekstraklasa: 1999–00
- Polish Cup: 2000–01
- Polish League Cup: 1999–00
- Polish Super Cup: 2000

ŁKS Łódź

- I liga: 2010–11
