= 2001–02 Ekstraklasa =

75th season of top-tier football league in Poland

Liga
- Season: 2001–02
- Champions: Legia Warsaw (7th title)
- Relegated: RKS Radomsko; Śląsk Wrocław; Stomil Olsztyn
- Top goalscorer: Maciej Żurawski (21 goals)
- Average attendance: 4,078 ▼8.7%

Statistics of Ekstraklasa for the 2001–02 season.

== Overview ==
16 teams competed in the 2001–02 season. Legia Warsaw won the championship.

== First phase ==
=== Group A ===
| Pos | Team | Pld | W | D | L | GF | GA | GD | Pts | Qualification |
|---|---|---|---|---|---|---|---|---|---|---|
| 1 | Odra Wodzisław | 14 | 10 | 1 | 3 | 28 | 14 | +14 | 31 | Qualification to championship group |
| 2 | Wisła Kraków | 14 | 9 | 1 | 4 | 28 | 15 | +13 | 28 | Qualification to championship group |
| 3 | Polonia Warsaw | 14 | 7 | 4 | 3 | 25 | 13 | +12 | 25 | Qualification to championship group |
| 4 | GKS Katowice | 14 | 5 | 3 | 6 | 17 | 23 | −6 | 18 | Qualification to championship group |
| 5 | Zagłębie Lubin | 14 | 5 | 3 | 6 | 23 | 28 | −5 | 18 | Qualification to relegation group |
| 6 | KSZO Ostrowiec Świętokrzyski | 14 | 4 | 3 | 7 | 14 | 18 | −4 | 15 | Qualification to relegation group |
| 7 | Górnik Zabrze | 14 | 2 | 5 | 7 | 13 | 22 | −9 | 11 | Qualification to relegation group |
| 8 | Widzew Łódź | 14 | 3 | 2 | 9 | 9 | 24 | −15 | 11 | Qualification to relegation group |

Source: 90minut.pl (in Polish)

==== Results ====
| Home \ Away | KAT | GÓR | KSZ | ODR | PWA | WID | WIS | ZLU |
|---|---|---|---|---|---|---|---|---|
| GKS Katowice | | 1–0 | 2–2 | 4–2 | 2–0 | 0–1 | 1–5 | 1–0 |
| Górnik Zabrze | 1–1 | | 0–0 | 1–3 | 0–0 | 1–1 | 1–2 | 2–2 |
| KSZO Ostrowiec | 1–0 | 1–2 | | 0–3 | 0–1 | 3–0 | 0–1 | 2–1 |
| Odra Wodzisław | 3–1 | 1–0 | 2–1 | | 3–0 | 2–0 | 1–0 | 3–0 |
| Polonia Warsaw | 1–2 | 4–1 | 2–0 | 2–2 | | 3–0 | 2–0 | 4–0 |
| Widzew Łódź | 2–0 | 1–2 | 0–0 | 1–2 | 0–3 | | 3–2 | 0–2 |
| Wisła Kraków | 3–0 | 2–1 | 0–1 | 1–0 | 2–2 | 2–0 | | 4–0 |
| Zagłębie Lubin | 2–2 | 3–1 | 4–3 | 3–1 | 1–1 | 2–0 | 3–4 | |

Source: 90minut.pl (in Polish)
Legend: Blue = home team win; Yellow = draw; Red = away team win.

=== Group B ===
| Pos | Team | Pld | W | D | L | GF | GA | GD | Pts | Qualification |
|---|---|---|---|---|---|---|---|---|---|---|
| 1 | Legia Warsaw | 14 | 8 | 3 | 3 | 31 | 14 | +17 | 27 | Qualification to championship group |
| 2 | Pogoń Szczecin | 14 | 7 | 3 | 4 | 20 | 16 | +4 | 24 | Qualification to championship group |
| 3 | Amica Wronki | 14 | 6 | 6 | 2 | 26 | 16 | +10 | 24 | Qualification to championship group |
| 4 | Ruch Chorzów | 14 | 5 | 4 | 5 | 16 | 18 | −2 | 19 | Qualification to championship group |
| 5 | Śląsk Wrocław | 14 | 5 | 3 | 6 | 21 | 25 | −4 | 18 | Qualification to relegation group |
| 6 | RKS Radomsko | 14 | 4 | 4 | 6 | 10 | 16 | −6 | 16 | Qualification to relegation group |
| 7 | Groclin Grodzisk | 14 | 4 | 3 | 7 | 18 | 23 | −5 | 15 | Qualification to relegation group |
| 8 | Stomil Olsztyn | 14 | 2 | 4 | 8 | 10 | 24 | −14 | 10 | Qualification to relegation group |

Source: 90minut.pl (in Polish)

==== Results ====
| Home \ Away | AMC | DSK | LEG | POG | RKS | RUC | STO | ŚLĄ |
|---|---|---|---|---|---|---|---|---|
| Amica Wronki | | 3–0 | 1–2 | 1–1 | 5–0 | 2–0 | 3–2 | 1–1 |
| Dyskobolia | 1–1 | | 2–3 | 2–0 | 0–2 | 4–1 | 2–0 | 2–4 |
| Legia Warsaw | 1–2 | 1–1 | | 3–0 | 2–1 | 1–1 | 2–0 | 3–4 |
| Pogoń Szczecin | 3–1 | 1–0 | 0–3 | | 2–1 | 0–0 | 3–0 | 2–1 |
| RKS Radomsko | 2–2 | 0–1 | 0–0 | 0–3 | | 1–0 | 2–0 | 1–0 |
| Ruch Chorzów | 2–2 | 3–0 | 0–4 | 3–0 | 1–0 | | 2–1 | 2–2 |
| Stomil Olsztyn | 0–0 | 0–0 | 1–6 | 1–1 | 0–0 | 0–1 | | 3–1 |
| Śląsk Wrocław | 1–2 | 4–3 | 1–0 | 0–4 | 0–0 | 1–0 | 1–2 | |

Source: 90minut.pl (in Polish)
Legend: Blue = home team win; Yellow = draw; Red = away team win.

== Final phase ==
=== Championship group ===
| Pos | Team | Pld | W | D | L | GF | GA | GD | Pts | Qualification |
|---|---|---|---|---|---|---|---|---|---|---|
| 1 | Legia Warsaw (C) | 14 | 7 | 7 | 0 | 19 | 10 | +9 | 28 | Qualification to Champions League second qualifying round |
| 2 | Wisła Kraków | 14 | 8 | 3 | 3 | 22 | 14 | +8 | 27 | Qualification to UEFA Cup qualifying round |
| 3 | Amica Wronki | 14 | 7 | 3 | 4 | 21 | 11 | +10 | 24 | Qualification to UEFA Cup qualifying round |
| 4 | Polonia Warsaw | 14 | 5 | 4 | 5 | 16 | 19 | −3 | 19 | Qualification to UEFA Cup qualifying round |
| 5 | Odra Wodzisław | 14 | 2 | 5 | 7 | 12 | 19 | −7 | 11 | |
| 6 | GKS Katowice | 14 | 4 | 5 | 5 | 10 | 15 | −5 | 17 | |
| 7 | Ruch Chorzów | 14 | 3 | 4 | 7 | 14 | 18 | −4 | 13 | |
| 8 | Pogoń Szczecin | 14 | 2 | 5 | 7 | 9 | 17 | −8 | 11 | |

Source: 90minut.pl (in Polish)
(C) Champions

==== Results ====
| Home \ Away | AMC | KAT | LEG | ODR | PWA | POG | RUC | WIS |
|---|---|---|---|---|---|---|---|---|
| Amica Wronki | | 4–0 | 0–0 | 2–1 | 4–0 | 1–0 | 2–0 | 2–1 |
| GKS Katowice | 0–1 | | 3–3 | 2–1 | 0–0 | 1–0 | 2–1 | 0–1 |
| Legia Warsaw | 3–2 | 1–0 | | 0–0 | 3–0 | 1–0 | 2–1 | 1–0 |
| Odra Wodzisław | 2–2 | 0–0 | 0–1 | | 0–2 | 1–1 | 3–1 | 0–3 |
| Polonia Warsaw | 1–0 | 0–0 | 0–0 | 2–1 | | 5–0 | 0–0 | 4–2 |
| Pogoń Szczecin | 0–0 | 0–1 | 2–2 | 2–1 | 2–0 | | 1–1 | 1–2 |
| Ruch Chorzów | 2–1 | 2–0 | 1–1 | 0–1 | 3–1 | 0–0 | | 1–2 |
| Wisła Kraków | 1–0 | 1–1 | 1–1 | 1–1 | 4–1 | 1–0 | 2–1 | |

Source: 90minut.pl (in Polish)
Legend: Blue = home team win; Yellow = draw; Red = away team win.

=== Relegation group ===
| Pos | Team | Pld | W | D | L | GF | GA | GD | Pts | Qualification or relegation |
|---|---|---|---|---|---|---|---|---|---|---|
| 9 | Górnik Zabrze | 14 | 8 | 4 | 2 | 23 | 11 | +12 | 28 | |
| 10 | Widzew Łódź | 14 | 6 | 7 | 1 | 19 | 8 | +11 | 25 | |
| 11 | Zagłębie Lubin | 14 | 5 | 5 | 4 | 18 | 16 | +2 | 20 | |
| 12 | Groclin Grodzisk | 14 | 6 | 2 | 6 | 18 | 15 | +3 | 20 | |
| 13 | KSZO Ostrowiec Świętokrzyski (O) | 14 | 4 | 5 | 5 | 14 | 19 | −5 | 17 | Qualification to relegation playoffs |
| 14 | RKS Radomsko (R) | 14 | 3 | 6 | 5 | 13 | 18 | −5 | 15 | Qualification to relegation playoffs |
| 15 | Śląsk Wrocław (R) | 14 | 2 | 4 | 8 | 14 | 22 | −8 | 10 | Relegated to II liga |
| 16 | Stomil Olsztyn (R) | 14 | 2 | 7 | 5 | 11 | 21 | −10 | 13 | Relegated to II liga |

Source: 90minut.pl (in Polish)
(O) Play-off winners; (R) Relegated

==== Results ====
| Home \ Away | GÓR | DSK | KSZ | RKS | STO | ŚLĄ | WID | ZLU |
|---|---|---|---|---|---|---|---|---|
| Górnik Zabrze | | 2–0 | 1–1 | 4–1 | 4–0 | 1–0 | 1–1 | 3–1 |
| Dyskobolia | 2–3 | | 4–0 | 1–0 | 1–2 | 2–1 | 0–1 | 1–2 |
| KSZO Ostrowiec | 2–0 | 1–2 | | 2–1 | 0–0 | 3–1 | 0–0 | 2–2 |
| RKS Radomsko | 0–2 | 0–0 | 3–0 | | 0–0 | 1–1 | 1–0 | 0–3 |
| Stomil Olsztyn | 0–0 | 1–2 | 1–0 | 1–1 | | 1–1 | 0–0 | 2–2 |
| Śląsk Wrocław | 1–2 | 0–2 | 2–2 | 1–2 | 3–1 | | 1–1 | 0–1 |
| Widzew Łódź | 2–0 | 1–1 | 2–0 | 2–2 | 4–1 | 2–0 | | 2–0 |
| Zagłębie Lubin | 0–0 | 1–0 | 0–1 | 1–1 | 3–1 | 1–2 | 1–1 | |

Source: 90minut.pl (in Polish)
Legend: Blue = home team win; Yellow = draw; Red = away team win.

== Relegation playoffs ==
The matches were played on 8 and 12 May 2002.

| Team 1 | Agg. | Team 2 | 1st leg | 2nd leg |
|---|---|---|---|---|
| Szczakowianka Jaworzno | 2–1 | RKS Radomsko | 2–0 | 0–1 |
| Górnik Łęczna | 1–3 | KSZO Ostrowiec Świętokrzyski | 0–1 | 1–2 |

== Top goalscorers ==
| Rank | Player | Club | Goals |
|---|---|---|---|
| 1 | (Poland) Maciej Żurawski | Wisła Kraków | 21 |
| 2 | (Poland) Grzegorz Rasiak | Dyskobolia Grodzisk | 14 |
| 3 | (Poland) Cezary Kucharski | Legia Warsaw | 13 |
| 4 | (Poland) Łukasz Sosin | Odra Wodzisław | 12 |
| 5 | (Poland) Mariusz Śrutwa | Ruch Chorzów | 11 |
| 6 | (Poland) Tomasz Moskała | GKS Katowice / Dyskobolia Grodzisk | 10 |
| 6 | (Poland) Arkadiusz Bąk | Polonia Warsaw / Widzew Łódź | 10 |
| 8 | (Poland) Tomasz Frankowski | Wisła Kraków | 9 |
| 8 | (Poland) Maciej Bykowski | Polonia Warsaw | 9 |
| 8 | (Poland) Tomasz Żelazowski | KSZO Ostrowiec Świętokrzyski | 9 |
| 8 | (Poland) Tomasz Dawidowski | Amica Wronki | 9 |

== Attendances ==
| Club | Average |
|---|---|
| Wisła Kraków | 7,286 |
| Legia Warszawa | 6,214 |
| Ostrowiec Świętokrzyski | 5,500 |
| Śląsk Wrocław | 5,321 |
| Stomil Olsztyn | 4,981 |
| Pogoń Szczecin | 4,929 |
| Widzew Łódź | 4,000 |
| Odra Wodzisław Śląski | 3,679 |
| Katowice | 3,536 |
| Radomsko | 3,214 |
| Dyskobolia | 3,000 |
| Górnik Zabrze | 2,967 |
| Ruch Chorzów | 2,924 |
| Polonia Warszawa | 2,757 |
| Amica Wronki | 2,500 |
| Zagłębie Lubin | 2,443 |
