= Hubert Robaszek =

Polish footballer

Personal information
- Date of birth: 25 April 1981 (age 45)
- Place of birth: Piotrków Trybunalski, Poland
- Height: 1.71 m (5 ft 7 in)
- Position: Midfielder

Senior career*
Years	Team	Apps	(Gls)
2000–2003	Piotrcovia		
2003–2004	Stasiak Opoczno	2	(0)
2004	Widzew Łódź	4	(0)
2005	Promień Żary		
2005–2006	KS Paradyż		
2006–2007	KSZO Ostrowiec	32	(3)
2007–2008	Polonia Bytom	17	(0)
2009	KSZO Ostrowiec	31	(3)
2010–2011	Dolcan Ząbki	26	(0)
2011–2014	Omega Kleszczów	75	(12)
2014–2015	Grabka Grabica		
2015–2018	GUKS Gorzkowice		
- * Club domestic league appearances and goals

Hubert Robaszek (born 25 April 1981) is a Polish former professional footballer who played as a midfielder.

== Career ==
In the winter 2010, he joined Dolcan Ząbki.

== Honours ==
KSZO Ostrowiec

- II liga East: 2008–09
