= Cezary Czpak =

Polish former footballer

Personal information
- Full name: Cezary Czpak
- Date of birth: 6 February 1982 (age 44)
- Place of birth: Jedlnia-Letnisko, Poland
- Height: 1.76 m (5 ft 9 in)
- Position: Midfielder

Youth career
- Radomiak Radom
- SMS Wrocław
- UKS SMS Łódź

Senior career*
Years	Team	Apps	(Gls)
2000	Vena Łódź		
2000–2001	Mień Lipno		
2001–2004	ŁKS Łódź		
2003	→ KSZO Ostrowiec (loan)	7	(2)
2004–2006	Mazowsze Grójec		
2006	Górnik Łęczna	2	(1)
2007–2009	Radomiak Radom		
2009–2010	Stal Stalowa Wola	29	(6)
2010–2011	Radomiak Radom	26	(12)
2011	Orzeł Wierzbica	16	(1)
2015	Oskar Przysucha		
- * Club domestic league appearances and goals

Cezary Czpak (born 6 February 1982) is a Polish former professional footballer who played as a midfielder.

He was the player of Radomiak Radom, SMS Wrocław, UKS SMS Łódź, Vena Łódź, Mień Lipno, ŁKS Łódź, KSZO Ostrowiec Świętokrzyski, Mazowsze Grójec, Stal Stalowa Wola, Orzeł Wierzbica and Oskar Przysucha. In 2006, he played two games in Ekstraklasa for Górnik Łęczna; scoring the goal in the debut game against GKS Bełchatów (1–3).

He retired from football after the 2015–16 autumn round season. In his last game, he scored a goal for Oskar Przysucha in a III liga match against Lechia Tomaszów Mazowiecki, as his team lost 1–2.
