= Tomasz Frankowski =

Polish footballer (born 1974)

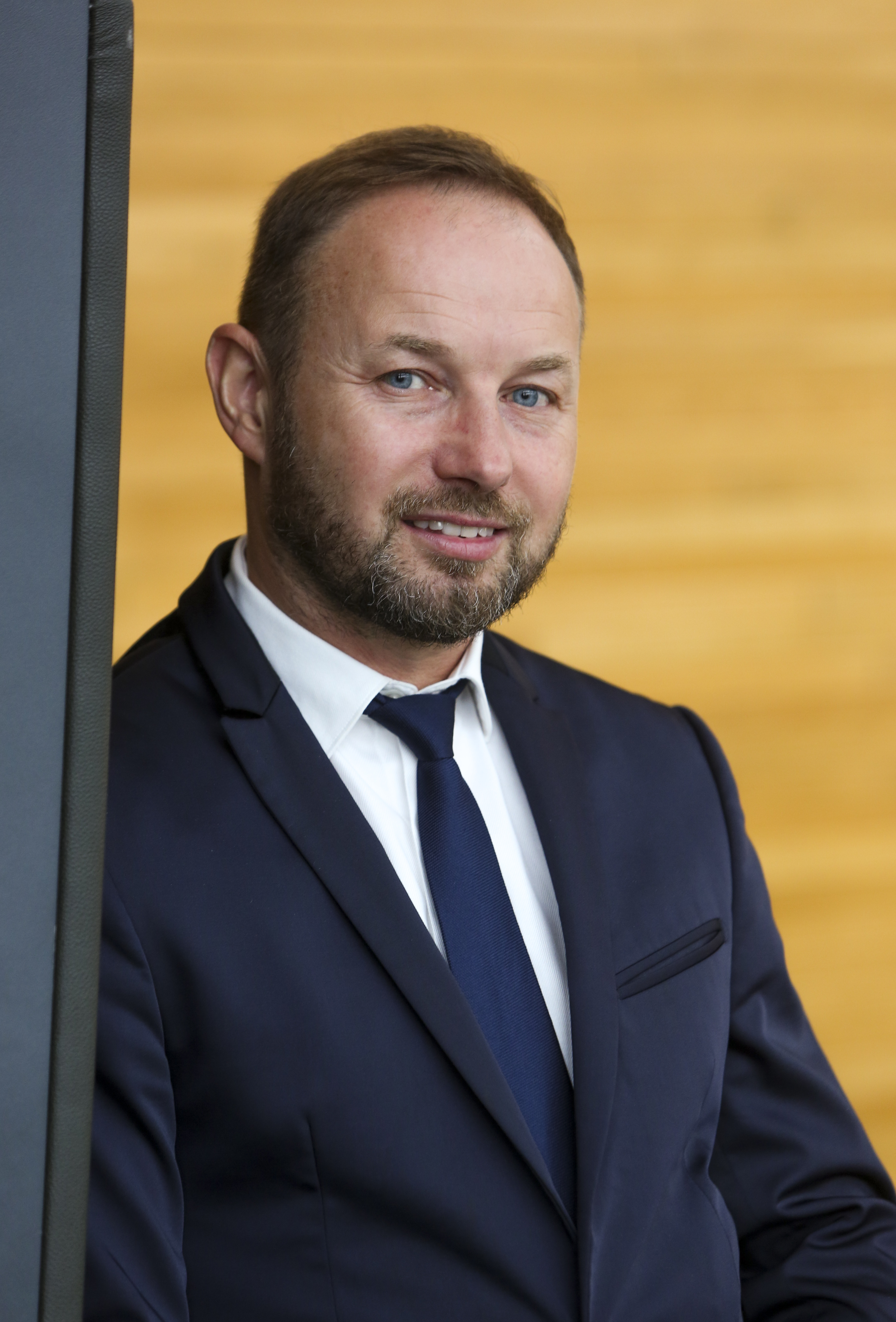

Personal information
- Date of birth: 16 August 1974 (age 52)
- Place of birth: Białystok, Poland
- Height: 5 ft 9 in (1.75 m)
- Position: Striker

Senior career*
Years	Team	Apps	(Gls)
1991–1993	Jagiellonia Białystok	12	(1)
1993–1996	Strasbourg	21	(2)
1996	Nagoya Grampus Eight	0	(0)
1996–1997	Poitiers	32	(22)
1997–1998	Martigues	19	(5)
1998–2005	Wisła Kraków	173	(115)
2005–2006	Elche	14	(8)
2006–2007	Wolverhampton Wanderers	16	(0)
2006–2007	→ Tenerife (loan)	19	(3)
2008	Chicago Fire	17	(2)
2009–2013	Jagiellonia Białystok	120	(52)
Total		450	(211)

International career
1999–2006	Poland	22	(10)
- * Club domestic league appearances and goals

Tomasz Frankowski (Polish pronunciation: [ˈtɔmaʂ fraŋˈkɔfskʲi]; born 16 August 1974) is a Polish former professional footballer who played as a striker. With 168 goals in 302 matches in Polish Ekstraklasa he is the league's third all-time scorer and was top league goalscorer four times.

Frankowski achieved his greatest success at Wisła Kraków of Poland, where he helped fire them to a collection of domestic honours. He also played in France, Japan, Spain, England, and the United States.

He was capped 22 times for the Poland national team, scoring ten goals. After his retirement, he was elected to the European Parliament for the Civic Platform in 2019.

== Club career ==
=== Early years and Wisła Kraków ===
As a native of Białystok, Frankowski began his career with his home town team Jagiellonia Białystok in 1991, before heading for France to play for RC Strasbourg (1993–1996), followed by a brief stint at Nagoya Grampus Eight of Japan (1996). He then returned to France to play for CFP Poitiers (1996–1997) and FC Martigues (1997–1998), before returning to his home country to play for Wisła Kraków.

His time at Wisła brought him his greatest successes, he helped the club win five Polish Championship titles (in 1999, 2001, 2003, 2004, 2005), two Polish Cups (in 2002 and 2003), and a Polish Super Cup in 2001. He was also the league's top scorer three times: with Wisla in 1999, 2001, and 2005 and with Jagiellonia in 2011.

=== Elche ===
In August 2005, Spanish Segunda División club Elche CF signed Frankowski. Neighbours Levante UD complained that they had secured him, and that Elche should pay them a €6 million release clause. He made his debut on 11 September as a 71st-minute substitute in a 1–0 loss at precisely that team. A week later, in his first home game, he opened the scoring in a 2–0 win over Polideportivo Ejido. He totalled eight goals in 14 games during his time at the Estadio Manuel Martínez Valero, including a hat-trick on 8 December in a 4–1 win over Numancia.

=== Wolverhampton Wanderers ===
On 25 January 2006, Frankowski signed a 2 1/2-year deal at Wolverhampton Wanderers, four points off the play-off places in England's Football League Championship. He signed for £1.4 million fee after being tracked by manager Glenn Hoddle, and Elche president Ramón Suárez resigned after losing the striker.

In August 2006, having not scored for Wolves, Frankowski was loaned back to Spain's second tier at Tenerife for the 2006–07 season. He scored three times in 18 games, including the opener on his home debut on 17 September in a 3–2 win over Hércules.

Upon returning to Molineux for training, he was challenged by manager Mick McCarthy to 'earn his transfer' to another club after no offers arrived for the striker with a year still remaining on his contract. However, he suffered a knee injury in pre-season training and was unable to attempt any action. By mutual consent, the club terminated his contract on 31 August 2007.

=== Chicago Fire ===
After a period of inactivity, Frankowski headed to join up with the Chicago Fire, finally signing a deal on 19 February 2008. He scored his first – and only – two goals for the club on 3 April during their home opener against the New England Revolution. However, as the season continued, his playing time greatly diminished, and he was regularly not even listed in the team's bench lineup. A possible cause of this was his critique of Fire Head Coach Denis Hamlett and his coaching style. On 26 November, Frankowski was released to help free up their salary cap after being one of the highest paid players on the team in the 2008 season.

=== Return to Jagiellonia Białystok ===
On 23 December 2008, Jagiellonia Białystok announced that Frankowski would rejoin his hometown team on a two-year contract. On 28 March 2010, he scored two goals in the 2–0 win over Arka Gdynia, surpassing Friedrich Scherfke and becoming Ekstraklasa's 9th all-time top scorer with 132 goals, the most for any active player.

On 1 August 2010, Frankowski won his second Polish Super Cup with Jagiellonia, scoring the only goal of a win against Lech Poznań. In the 2010–11 season, he was the top scorer for the fourth in his career by scoring 14 goals. On 30 March 2013, he scored his 167th goal in top Polish tier, following up with his 168th goal on 6 April in his 295th game, thereby becoming Ekstraklasa's third all-time scorer, exceeding 167 goals mark set in 1950s by Gerard Cieślik. He retired after the 2012–13 season.

== International career ==
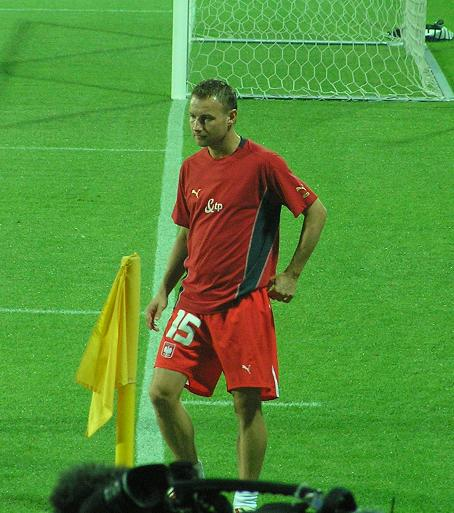
Frankowski during a match between Poland and Wales

Frankowski scored ten goals in 22 appearances for the Poland national team. He made his senior international debut on 28 April 1999 in a 2–1 win over the Czech Republic and netted his first international goal the following year, against Iceland.

He was Poland's top scorer in their qualifying campaign for the 2006 World Cup in Germany, but his poor form for Wolves in 2006 meant that he was omitted from the tournament squad. He called manager Paweł Janas a backstabber and criticised his indirectness, as he and Jerzy Dudek had learned of their omissions from journalists and not the manager. He returned to the international fold after this, under new coach Leo Beenhakker, but won only two further caps.

== Career statistics ==
=== International ===
Appearances and goals by national team and year
National team	Year	Apps	Goals
Poland
Poland	1999	2	0
Poland	2000	2	1
Poland	2004	3	2
Poland	2005	10	7
Poland	2006	5	0
Total		22	10

Scores and results list Poland's goal tally first, score column indicates score after each Frankowski goal.

List of international goals scored by Tomasz Frankowski
No.	Date	Venue	Opponent	Score	Result	Competition
1	15 November 2000	Polish Army Stadium, Warsaw, Poland	Iceland	1–0	1–0	Friendly
2	9 October 2004	Ernst-Happel-Stadion, Vienna, Austria	Austria	3–1	3–1	2006 FIFA World Cup qualification
3	13 October 2004	Millennium Stadium, Cardiff, Wales	Wales	1–1	3–2	2006 FIFA World Cup qualification
4	26 March 2005	Polish Army Stadium, Warsaw, Poland	Azerbaijan	1–0	8–0	2006 FIFA World Cup qualification
5	26 March 2005	Polish Army Stadium, Warsaw, Poland	Azerbaijan	4–0	8–0	2006 FIFA World Cup qualification
6	26 March 2005	Polish Army Stadium, Warsaw, Poland	Azerbaijan	5–0	8–0	2006 FIFA World Cup qualification
7	4 June 2005	Tofiq Bahramov Republican Stadium, Baku, Azerbaijan	Azerbaijan	1–0	3–0	2006 FIFA World Cup qualification
8	12 October 2005	Old Trafford, Manchester, England	England	1–1	1–1	2006 FIFA World Cup qualification
9	15 August 2005	Valeriy Lobanovskyi Dynamo Stadium, Kyiv, Ukraine	Serbia and Montenegro	1–0	3–2	2005 Valeriy Lobanovskyi Memorial Tournament
10	15 August 2005	Valeriy Lobanovskyi Dynamo Stadium, Kyiv, Ukraine	Serbia and Montenegro	3–1	3–2	2005 Valeriy Lobanovskyi Memorial Tournament

== Honours ==
Strasbourg

- UEFA Intertoto Cup: 1995

Wisła Kraków

- Ekstraklasa: 1998–99, 2000–01, 2002–03, 2003–04, 2004–05
- Polish Cup: 2001–02, 2002–03
- Polish League Cup: 2000–01
- Polish Super Cup: 2001

Jagiellonia Białystok

- Polish Cup: 2009–10
- Polish Super Cup: 2010

Individual

- Ekstraklasa top scorer: 1998–99, 2000–01, 2004–05, 2010–11
- Polish Cup top scorer: 2001–02, 2009–10
- Polish Newcomer of the Year: 1998
- Ekstraklasa Player of the Year: 2004
- Ekstraklasa Player of the Month: October 2010

== Political activity ==
Frankowski is a member of Civic Platform led by Donald Tusk. In European Parliament election in 2019 he was elected from the first place in Podlaskie and Warmian-Masurian constituency. In 2021, he voiced his opposition to the planned European Super League and to holding the World Cup every two years.
