= KSZO Ostrowiec Świętokrzyski =

Polish football club

- Full name: KSZO 1929 Ostrowiec Świętokrzyski
- Nicknames: Pomarańczowo-czarni (The Orange and Blacks); Kszoki
- Founded: 11 August 1929; 97 years ago as Klub Sportowy Zakładów Ostrowieckich Ostrowiec Świętokrzyski; 2011; 15 years ago as KSZO S.S.A.; 2011; 15 years ago as KSZO 1929
- Ground: KSZO Municipal Sports Stadium
- Capacity: 7,430
- Chairman: Piotr Chorab
- Manager: Kacper Marzec
- League: III liga, group IV
- 2025–26: III liga, group IV, 2nd of 18
- Website: kszo1929.pl
Home colours	Away colours

KSZO 1929 Ostrowiec Świętokrzyski (Polish pronunciation: [ˈkʂɔ ɔsˈtrɔvjɛt͡s ɕfjɛntɔˈkʂɨskʲi]) is a Polish football club based in Ostrowiec Świętokrzyski. It was initially founded on 11 August 1929. They currently play in group IV of the III liga, the fourth division of national football league system.

== History ==
Initially, a club called Ostrovia existed in the city. It was established between 1922 and 1924 and dissolved in 1926. KSZO was established in 1929. The construction of the KSZO Municipal Sports Stadium began in 1931 and finished in 1934. As a result of the Nazi invasion of Poland, the club's activities ceased in 1939.

The club activities resumed in 1945. Between 1949 and 1956, the club was called Stal.

In 2011, the club declared bankruptcy. The same year, it was reorganized under the name KSZO 1929, and asserted the history and grounds of the original KSZO.

=== League history ===
KSZO joined the C klasa, the lowest level of regional leagues in Poland at the time, in 1932 gaining promotion to B klasa the same year. In 1934, the club was promoted to A klasa, the top regional level. In 1937, it was moved to the Kraków Regional Football Association as the regional association based in Kielce the club hitherto belonged to was disbanded.

Having resumed activity after World War II, the club participated in lower-level regional leagues. In 1950, KSZO (then called Stal) was merged with another local club, Związkowiec. The management of the steelworks decided to focus on building a better football team. From the 1960s until the early 1980s, KSZO took part in third-level competitions several times. However, the club wasn't able to advance further or maintain their place for more than a few seasons.

In the early 90s, the steelworks became more committed to financing the club's activities. In 1990, the club was promoted to the III liga, the third level of Polish association football at the time, once again. Five seasons later, KSZO was promoted to the second tier for the first time.

In the 1995–96 season, the first after promotion to the eastern group of II liga, KSZO finished 13th out of 18 teams, avoiding relegation by just three points. However, at the end of the following season, the club was ranked second behind Petrochemia Płock and won promotion to the top tier of Polish football.

The 1997–98 season, KSZO's first in top flight ended in relegation as the club only managed to finish 17th out of 18 teams.

Having returned to the second level, KSZO finished the 1998–99 campaign fourth in the eastern group. Next season, both groups were merged to create one 24-team second division. That year, KSZO was 12th. In the 2000–01 season, the club finished second behind RKS Radomsko and was promoted to the top tier for the second time.

The 2001–02 season was played according to an unusual formula, the teams being divided into two groups ("A" and "B") of 8 teams each. Top four teams from each group advanced to the "championship group", the bottom four proceeded to the "relegation group". At the end of the first stage of the season, KSZO was ranked 6th out of 8 in group A which meant it took part in the "relegation group". There, KSZO finished 5th out of 8, which meant 13th place at the end of the season. Playoff matches against Górnik Łęczna followed, both of which were won by KSZO.

In 2002–03, after a promising start, financial problems became more and more apparent. In addition to that, a conflict between the club management and the players, that ended in most players from the first team refusing to play and leaving the club, had a detrimental effect on the club's result. A completely new squad was formed based on players from junior teams and lower-level clubs but it proved to be inadequate for the top tier. Not managing to earn even a single point during the spring round, the club was directly relegated, ultimately being ranked 15th, ahead of only Pogoń Szczecin - a club that was also experiencing major difficulties at the time.

KSZO started the 2003–04 season at the second tier but withdrew at the halfway stage of the season, its results being annulled. Due to huge debts, the association underwent liquidation.

The club was then recreated on the basis of another second-tier club, KS Stasiak Ceramika Opoczno. From that point onwards, the club took part in second division matches as KSZO S.S.A. (sports p.l.c.) finishing mid-table for three consecutive seasons. However, in 2007, the club was expelled from the second division (effectively relegated to the third level) and fined because its former chairman, Mirosław Stasiak, was accused of bribery.

KSZO finished the 2007–08 season in sixth place despite having 6 points deducted due to the aforementioned corruption accusations. Due to the reorganization of the Polish football leagues, the club was moved to the eastern group of the new II liga, which still was the third tier. KSZO won its group without losing a single match at home and was promoted to the second tier, now called I liga, again. In the 2009–10 season, KSZO finished 8th out of 18 teams. However, the following season, the club was ranked only 16th, losing the relegation battle by a single point. KSZO participated in third-tier matches during the 2011–12 campaign but withdrew after 20 out of 30 legs and was therefore ranked last. This marked the end of KSZO SSA.

In 2011, the new club, called KSZO 1929, was formed and joined the regional league, the sixth level of Polish association football the same year and won promotion. The following season, KSZO 1929 won the fifth-level competition and was promoted to the III liga, group IV (the fourth division), where the club has been playing since.

== Fans ==
Although KSZO supporters' nickname is Świętokrzyscy Rozbójnicy, i.e. the Holy Cross (a reference to the Świętokrzyskie Voivodeship) Reavers, they are known for outstanding atmosphere and high attendance during the matches.

KSZO fans have a fellowship with fans of Lech Poznań (since 1992) and Arka Gdynia (since 2004). There are good relations with fans of Wisła Sandomierz and Powiślanka Lipsko. They used have friendships with Stal Sanok and Slovan Liberec.

Their biggest rivals are regional opponents Korona Kielce with whom they contest the Holy Cross Province derby. Other rivals include Hutnik Nowa Huta and Stal Stalowa Wola with whom they contest the steelworks derbies They also have a strong dislike of Radomiak Radom.

== Players ==
=== Current squad ===
As of 14 September 2025

Note: Flags indicate national team as defined under FIFA eligibility rules; some limited exceptions apply. Players may hold more than one non-FIFA nationality.

No.	Pos.	Nation	Player
1	GK	POL	Grzegorz Drazik
3	GK	POL	Filip Zaczek
4	MF	POL	Paweł Czajkowski
6	MF	POL	Piotr Lisowski
7	MF	POL	Dawid Zięba (on loan from Stal Mielec)
8	MF	POL	Patryk Orlik
9	FW	POL	Mateusz Majewski
10	MF	UKR	Farid Ali
11	DF	POL	Maciej Mrozik
12	GK	POL	Mateusz Dukielski
14	MF	POL	Łukasz Siedlecki
16	MF	POL	Eryk Galara
17	MF	UKR	Yevheniy Belych
19	DF	POL	Jakub Czajkowski

No.	Pos.	Nation	Player
20	MF	POL	Daniel Morys
21	MF	POL	Sebastian Goc
24	GK	POL	Bartosz Klebaniuk
26	DF	POL	Piotr Łazarz
27	MF	POL	Dawid Lisowski
28	DF	POL	Bartosz Waleńcik
30	DF	POL	Mikołaj Bednarski
35	DF	POL	Eryk Marcinkowski (on loan from Chrobry Głogów)
44	FW	POL	Damian Lepiarz
70	DF	POL	Jarosław Lis
73	FW	POL	Piotr Czajkowski
77	MF	POL	Mateusz Nowak
78	MF	POL	Jakub Górski

=== Notable players ===
Player who have played in the top-flight

- (Poland) Sławomir Adamus
- (Brazil) Sergio Batata
- (Poland) Arkadiusz Bilski
- (Poland) Dariusz Brytan
- (Poland) Mirosław Budka
- (Poland) Przemysław Cichoń
- (Poland) Cezary Czpak
- (Poland) Jacek Dąbrowski
- (Poland) Tomasz Dymanowski
- (Poland) Piotr Gierczak
- (Poland) Marek Graba
- (Nigeria) Sunday Ibrahim
- (Poland) Janusz Jojko
- (Poland) Mariusz Jop
- (Poland) Marcin Kaczmarek
- (Poland) Paweł Kaczorowski
- (Nigeria) Maxwell Kalu
- (Poland) Krystian Kanarski
- (Poland) Andrzej Kobylański
- (Poland) Kamil Kosowski
- (Poland) Tadeusz Krawiec
- (Poland) Rafał Lasocki
- (Poland) Wojciech Małocha
- (Poland) Arkadiusz Miklosik
- (Poland) Daniel Morys
- (Poland) Benedykt Nocoń
- (Poland) Waldemar Piątek
- (Poland) Dariusz Pietrasiak
- (Lithuania) Aidas Preikšaitis
- (Poland) Hubert Robaszek
- (Poland) Maciej Rogalski
- (Poland) Artur Sarnat
- (Poland) Marek Sokołowski
- (Serbia) Davor Tasić
- (Poland) Rafał Wójcik
- (Poland) Gaszczyn Wołodia
- (Poland) Marcin Wróbel
- (Poland) Tomasz Żelazowski

== See also ==
- Football in Poland
- List of football teams
