= Przemysław Cichoń =

Polish footballer

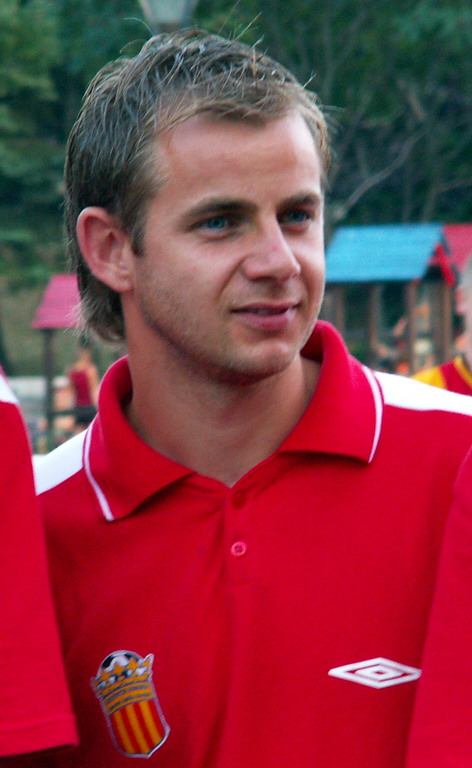
- Cichoń in 2006

Personal information
- Date of birth: 25 October 1978 (age 48)
- Place of birth: Kielce, Poland
- Height: 1.76 m (5 ft 9 1/2 in)
- Position: Defender

Team information
- Current team: GKS Nowiny (manager)

Senior career*
Years	Team	Apps	(Gls)
1993–2000	Korona Kielce		
2000–2003	KSZO Ostrowiec Świętokrzyski		
2003–2007	Korona Kielce		
2008–2009	Pelikan Łowicz	40	(3)
2009–2010	Broń Radom		
2012–2013	Łysica Bodzentyn	39	(0)
2013–2021	GKS Nowiny		

Managerial career
- 2023–: GKS Nowiny
- * Club domestic league appearances and goals

Przemysław Cichoń (born 25 October 1978) is a Polish former professional footballer who played as a defender. He is currently the manager of GKS Nowiny, and previously served as the club's chairman.

== Honours ==
Korona Kielce

- II liga: 2004–05
- III liga, group IV: 2003–04
