= Farid Ali (footballer) =

Ukrainian footballer (born 1992)

Personal information
- Full name: Farid Akhmetovych Ali
- Date of birth: 11 February 1992 (age 34)
- Place of birth: Kyiv, Ukraine
- Height: 1.70 m (5 ft 7 in)
- Position: Winger

Team information
- Current team: KSZO Ostrowiec Św.
- Number: 10

Youth career
- 2006–2009: Arsenal Kyiv

Senior career*
Years	Team	Apps	(Gls)
2009–2012	Arsenal Kyiv	0	(0)
2013–2015	Metalurh Zaporizhzhia	1	(0)
2016–2025	GKS Jastrzębie	246	(31)
2025–	KSZO Ostrowiec Św.	17	(2)
- * Club domestic league appearances and goals as of 19:36, 9 June 2026 (UTC)

Farid Akhmetovych Ali (Ukrainian: Фарід Ахметович Алі; born 11 February 1992) is a Ukrainian professional footballer who plays as a winger for Polish side KSZO Ostrowiec Świętokrzyski.

Ali is a product of the Arsenal Kyiv's youth team system.

He made his Ukrainian Premier League debut for Metalurh Zaporizhzhia in a match against Karpaty Lviv on 31 October 2015.

== Honours ==
GKS Jastrzębie

- II liga: 2017–18
- III liga, group III: 2016–17
- Polish Cup (Silesia regionals): 2015–16
