= Spójnia Świdwin =

Polish football club

Spójnia Świdwin is a Polish soccer club founded on 8 October 1969 in Świdwin, West Pomeranian Voivodeship, northwestern Poland. Club's department is on Sportowa 7 street. Team's coach is Wojciech Kędzierski.

== History ==
Club name is Spójnia Świdwin from 1969 (temporarily as Budowlani). Spójnia decrease took traditions from: Związkowiec (1946–1947), Zryw (to 1950), Kolejarz (1950–1959), Polonia (to 1962), Rega and Start. In 90's took part of active players from military soccer club Granit Świdwin (established 1963).

== Achievements ==
In season 1995/1996 Spójnia won IV league, but didn't participate in III league games.
