= 1998–99 Ekstraklasa =

72nd season of top-tier football league in Poland

Liga
- Season: 1998–99
- Champions: Wisła Kraków; 7th Ekstraklasa title 6th Polish title
- Relegated: GKS Bełchatów; GKS Katowice
- Matches: 240
- Goals: 608 (2.53 per match)
- Top goalscorer: Tomasz Frankowski (21 goals)
- Average attendance: 4,158 ▼4.5%

Statistics of Ekstraklasa for the 1998–99 season.

== Overview ==
A total of 16 teams competed in the 1998–99 season. Wisła Kraków won the championship.

== League table ==
Pos	Team	Pld	W	D	L	GF	GA	GD	Pts	Qualification or relegation
1	Wisła Kraków (C)	30	23	4	3	75	23	+52	73	
2	Widzew Łódź	30	18	2	10	50	33	+17	56	Qualification to Champions League second qualifying round (Note: Wisła Kraków were banned by UEFA and replaced by runners-up Widzew Łódź.)
3	Legia Warsaw	30	16	8	6	41	25	+16	56	Qualification to UEFA Cup qualifying round
4	Lech Poznań	30	17	3	10	55	36	+19	54	Qualification to UEFA Cup qualifying round
5	Polonia Warsaw	30	13	7	10	38	31	+7	46	Qualification to Intertoto Cup first round
6	Ruch Radzionków	30	10	11	9	40	35	+5	41	
7	Górnik Zabrze	30	9	12	9	34	31	+3	39	
8	Zagłębie Lubin	30	9	11	10	42	44	−2	38	
9	Stomil Olsztyn	30	10	7	13	29	38	−9	37	
10	Ruch Chorzów	30	9	9	12	23	36	−13	36	
11	ŁKS Łódź	30	8	10	12	33	45	−12	34	
12	Amica Wronki	30	9	7	14	31	39	−8	34	Qualification to UEFA Cup qualifying round
13	Pogoń Szczecin	30	9	6	15	33	54	−21	33	
14	Odra Wodzisław	30	8	8	14	33	41	−8	32	
15	GKS Bełchatów (R)	30	7	7	16	26	48	−22	28	Relegated to II liga
16	GKS Katowice (R)	30	5	8	17	25	49	−24	23	Relegated to II liga

Source: 90minut.pl (in Polish)
(C) Champions; (R) Relegated

== Results ==
Home \ Away	AMC	BEŁ	KAT	GÓR	LPO	LEG	ŁKS	ODR	POG	PWA	RUC	RAD	STO	WID	WIS	ZLU
Amica Wronki		2–0	4–0	0–0	2–1	0–2	1–2	3–1	2–0	1–0	2–0	1–0	0–0	2–3	1–3	2–1
GKS Bełchatów	1–1		1–2	1–1	1–3	1–2	2–3	1–1	2–0	0–1	0–2	2–1	1–0	3–2	0–3	0–1
GKS Katowice	0–0	1–1		1–1	1–2	1–3	1–1	1–1	1–0	1–3	0–1	1–0	1–0	0–2	1–2	2–2
Górnik Zabrze	0–0	1–3	2–1		1–2	1–0	0–0	0–1	4–0	2–0	2–0	1–1	1–1	0–1	2–2	2–2
Lech Poznań	2–0	3–0	3–1	3–1		0–0	3–1	3–0	2–2	0–1	5–0	1–2	1–1	2–0	1–3	4–0
Legia Warsaw	3–1	3–0	0–0	0–1	1–0		3–2	0–0	2–0	3–0	2–0	1–1	1–0	1–0	1–2	1–1
ŁKS Łódź	2–0	2–0	3–2	2–2	1–2	1–1		2–1	1–1	0–0	0–0	0–1	2–0	0–1	0–3	0–2
Odra Wodzisław	1–0	0–0	0–2	0–1	2–0	1–2	2–1		3–0	2–2	2–2	3–1	1–1	2–0	0–2	0–1
Pogoń Szczecin	3–2	1–0	1–0	0–1	2–3	3–1	1–1	1–0		1–0	1–0	3–2	2–2	1–2	0–4	3–2
Polonia Warsaw	4–2	4–0	2–0	1–0	1–2	0–0	2–1	2–1	2–2		3–0	0–0	0–1	2–1	1–3	3–1
Ruch Chorzów	0–0	1–1	2–1	2–1	2–1	0–1	1–2	0–2	1–1	0–0		1–0	1–0	2–1	1–1	0–0
Ruch Radzionków	1–1	1–1	1–1	0–0	4–1	1–2	4–0	2–0	3–2	0–0	1–0		1–0	5–0	1–1	3–3
Stomil Olsztyn	4–1	0–2	2–1	2–1	0–2	1–2	1–0	3–1	3–1	1–0	1–0	0–0		2–1	1–2	1–1
Widzew Łódź	3–0	1–0	1–0	0–1	3–0	3–2	5–0	2–0	2–1	4–1	1–1	2–1	5–0		1–0	1–1
Wisła Kraków	1–0	4–0	4–1	2–1	2–1	4–1	1–1	2–1	4–0	1–3	4–1	6–0	3–0	3–1		0–1
Zagłębie Lubin	1–0	1–2	4–0	3–3	1–2	0–0	2–2	4–4	2–0	1–0	0–2	1–2	3–1	0–1	0–3	

Source: 90minut.pl (in Polish)
Legend: Blue = home team win; Yellow = draw; Red = away team win.

== Top goalscorers ==
Rank	Player	Club	Goals
1	(Poland) Tomasz Frankowski	Wisła Kraków	21
2	(Poland) Artur Wichniarek	Widzew Łódź	20
3	(Poland) Mariusz Nosal	Odra Wodzisław	14
4	(Poland) Marian Janoszka	Ruch Radzionków	12
4	(Poland) Bartosz Karwan	Legia Warsaw	12
4	(Poland) Piotr Reiss	Lech Poznań	12
7	(Poland) Mariusz Śrutwa	Ruch Chorzów / Legia Warsaw	11
7	(Poland) Maciej Żurawski	Lech Poznań	11
9	(Poland) Olgierd Moskalewicz	Pogoń Szczecin / Wisła Kraków	10

== Attendances ==
Club	Average
Wisła Kraków	7,720
Lech Poznań	6,933
ŁKS	6,187
Legia Warszawa	6,000
Ruch Radzionków	5,933
Stomil Olsztyn	5,500
Pogoń Szczecin	4,833
Widzew Łódź	3,966
Odra Wodzisław Śląski	3,483
Górnik Zabrze	3,116
Ruch Chorzów	2,585
GKS Bełchatów	2,487
Zagłębie Lubin	2,307
GKS Katowice	2,232
Amica Wronki	1,700
Polonia Warszawa	1,547
