= 2002–03 Polish Cup =

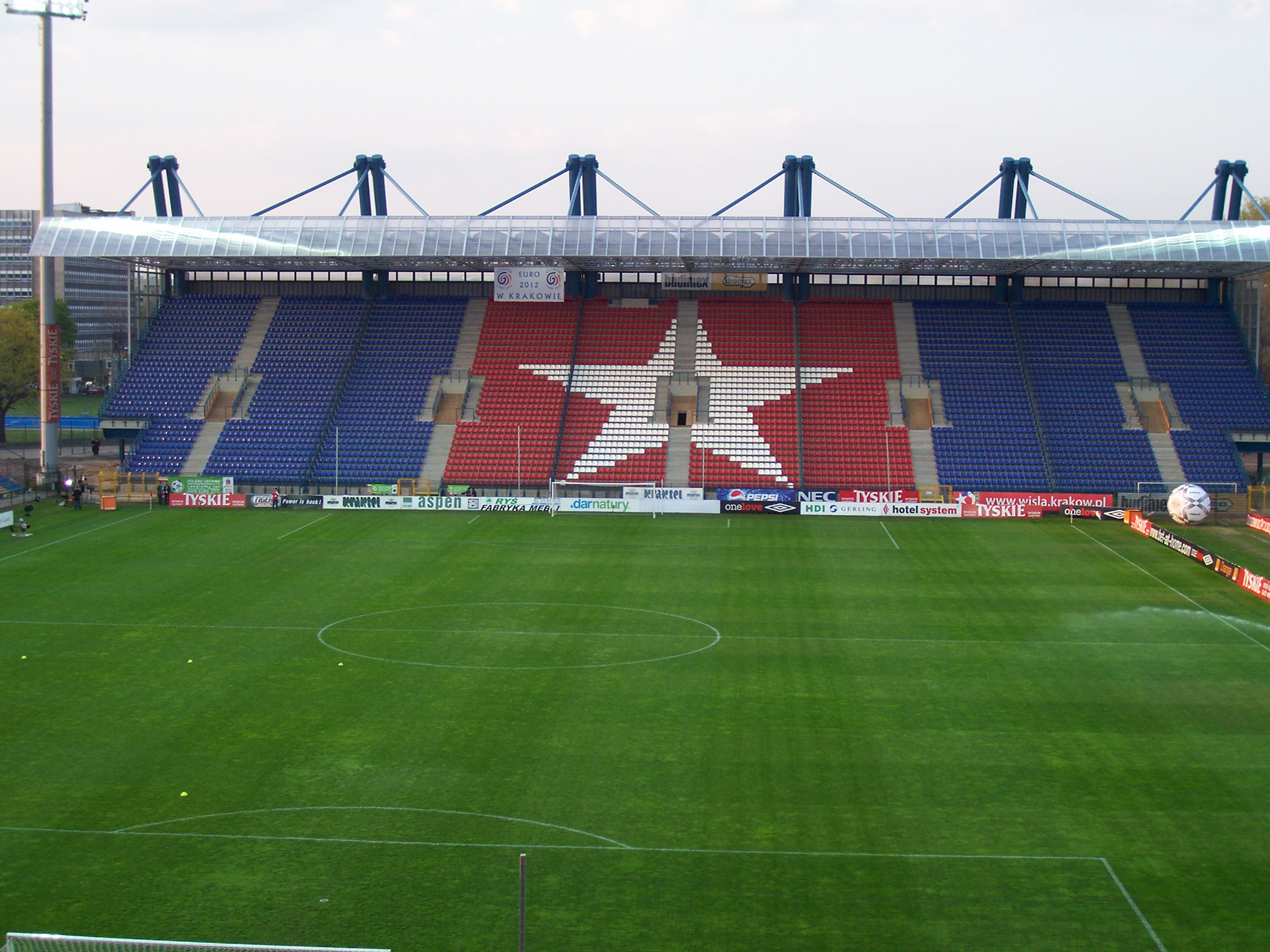
- North stand at Wisla Stadium

Tournament details
- Country: Poland
- Teams: 52

Final positions
- Champions: Wisła Kraków
- Runners-up: Wisła Płock

Tournament statistics
- Matches played: 58
- Goals scored: 184 (3.17 per match)
- Top goal scorer(s): Maciej Żurawski (6 goals)

The 2002–03 Polish Cup was the forty-ninth season of the annual Polish cup competition. It began on 5 August 2002 with the preliminary round and ended on 14 May 2003 with second leg of the Final, played at Stadion Wisły Płock, Płock. The winners qualified for the qualifying round of the UEFA Cup. Wisła Kraków were the defending champions.

== Preliminary round ==
The matches took place on 5 and 6 August 2002.

Team 1	Score	Team 2
5 August 2002
Jagiellonia Białystok	3–0	Odra Opole
Świt Nowy Dwór Mazowiecki	1–0	MKS Myszków
6 August 2002
ŁKS Łódź	1–0	Włókniarz Kietrz
Hutnik Kraków	2–3	Zagłębie Sosnowiec

== Round 1 ==
The matches took place on 28 August 2002.

Team 1	Score	Team 2
28 August 2002
Warmia Grajewo	1–1 (a.e.t.) (1–4 p)	ŁKS Łódź
Chojniczanka Chojnice	0–3	GKS Bełchatów
Okęcie Warszawa	1–0	Tłoki Gorzyce
KS Kędzierzyn-Koźle	1–5	Szczakowianka Jaworzno
Alit Ożarów	1–0	Górnik Łęczna
Galicja Cisna	1–5	Ceramika Opoczno
Lech/Zryw Zielona Góra	4–1	Świt Nowy Dwór Mazowiecki
Pogoń Oleśnica	2–3	Zagłębie Sosnowiec
Unia Skierniewice	2–2 (a.e.t.) (5–4 p)	Ruch Radzionków
Polonia Olimpia Elbląg	2–1	Arka Gdynia
Lewart Lubartów	1–2	Jagiellonia Białystok
Jagiellonka Nieszawa	0–4	Wisła Płock
Jarota Jarocin	1–4	Gornik Polkowice
Unia Racibórz	1–2	Polar Wrocław
Górnik Brzeszcze	0–2	Hetman Zamość
Zorza Dobrzany	1–1 (a.e.t.) (1–3 p)	Lech Poznań

== Round 2 ==
The matches took place on 10, 11 and 25 September 2002.

Team 1	Score	Team 2
10 September 2002
Wisła Płock	3–1 (a.e.t.)	Górnik Zabrze
Lech Poznań	2–0	Ruch Chorzów
11 September 2002
Okęcie Warszawa	0–3	Legia Warsaw
Lech/Zryw Zielona Góra	0–2 (a.e.t.)	RKS Radomsko
Hetman Zamość	2–0	Śląsk Wrocław
ŁKS Łódź	1–3	Pogoń Szczecin
Alit Ożarów	0–2	Odra Wodzisław
Zagłębie Sosnowiec	1–3	Stomil Olsztyn
KSZO Ostrowiec Świętokrzyski	2–1	Polonia Warsaw
GKS Bełchatów	2–3	Amica Wronki
Unia Skierniewice	3–5	Polar Wrocław
Zagłębie Lubin	4–1	GKS Katowice
Polonia Olimpia Elbląg	0–6	Ceramika Opoczno
Gornik Polkowice	0–1	Dyskobolia Grodzisk Wlkp.
Szczakowianka Jaworzno	1–3	Wisła Kraków
25 September 2002
Jagiellonia Białystok	1–2	Widzew Łódź

== Round 3 ==
The matches took place between 11 and 30 October 2002.

Team 1	Score	Team 2
11 October 2002
Wisła Płock	1–0	KSZO Ostrowiec Świętokrzyski
16 October 2002
Legia Warsaw	0–1	RKS Radomsko
23 October 2002
Polar Wrocław	1–0	Amica Wronki
Wisła Kraków	5–0	Dyskobolia Grodzisk Wlkp.
30 October 2002
Hetman Zamość	1–2 (a.e.t.)	Pogoń Szczecin
Stomil Olsztyn	0–1	Odra Wodzisław
Widzew Łódź	4–2	Zagłębie Lubin
Lech Poznań	1–2	Ceramika Opoczno

== Quarter-finals ==
The first legs took place on 6 November, when the second legs took place on 30 November and 1 December 2002.

Team 1	Agg.	Team 2	1st leg	2nd leg
Pogoń Szczecin	2–3	RKS Radomsko	2–0	0–3
Odra Wodzisław	1–3	Wisła Płock	1–0	0–3
Widzew Łódź	7–3	Polar Wrocław	2–0	5–3
Ceramika Opoczno	2–7	Wisła Kraków	2–2	0–5

== Semi-finals ==
The first legs took place on 16 April, when the second legs took place on 23 April 2003.

Team 1	Agg.	Team 2	1st leg	2nd leg
RKS Radomsko	1–2	Wisła Płock	0–1	1–1
Widzew Łódź	2–3	Wisła Kraków	1–2	1–1

== Final ==
=== First leg ===
7 May 2003
18:00 CEST (UTC+02:00)

Wisła Kraków	0–1	Wisła Płock
	Report	Jeleń 20'

Stadion Miejski, Kraków
Attendance: 4,000
Referee: Robert Małek (Zabrze)

=== Second leg ===
14 May 2003
18:00 CEST (UTC+02:00)

Wisła Płock	0–3	Wisła Kraków
	Report	Żurawski 27'; Kuźba 59', 60'

Stadion Wisły Płock, Płock
Attendance: 10,000
Referee: Mirosław Ryszka (Warsaw)

Wisła Kraków won 3–1 on aggregate
