= 2001–02 Polish Cup =

Tournament details
- Country: Poland
- Teams: 52

Final positions
- Champions: Wisła Kraków
- Runners-up: Amica Wronki

Tournament statistics
- Matches played: 58
- Goals scored: 192 (3.31 per match)
- Top goal scorer(s): Tomasz Frankowski (7 goals)

The 2001–02 Polish Cup was the forty-eighth season of the annual Polish cup competition. It began on 12 September 2001 with the preliminary round and ended on 10 May 2002 with second leg of the final, played at Stadion Miejski, Kraków. The winners qualified for the qualifying round of the UEFA Cup. Polonia Warsaw were the defending champions.

== Preliminary round ==
The matches took place on 12 September 2001.

Team 1	Score	Team 2
12 September 2001
MKS Myszków	7–0	Dolcan Ząbki
Hetman Zamość	3–0	Lechia/Polonia Gdańsk
Zagłębie Sosnowiec	2–2 (a.e.t.) (5–6 p)	Stal Stalowa Wola
Polar Wrocław	1–0	Polonia Bytom

== Round 1 ==
The matches took place on 18 and 19 September 2001.

Team 1	Score	Team 2
18 September 2001
Wigry Suwałki	1–2	Świt Nowy Dwór Mazowiecki
Widzew II Łódź	0–2	Hetman Zamość
19 September 2001
Cracovia	2–2 (a.e.t.) (1–4 p)	Lech Poznań
Pogoń Staszów	2–3	MKS Myszków
Toruński KP	0–3	RKS Radomsko
Kaszubia Kościerzyna	1–3	ŁKS Łódź
Orlęta Łuków	2–5	KSZO Ostrowiec Świętokrzyski
Stal Sanok	0–1	Górnik Łęczna
Małapanew Ozimek	1–1 (a.e.t.) (4–3 p)	Tłoki Gorzyce
Polonia Elbląg	2–1	GKS Bełchatów
Rozbark Bytom	1–3	Odra Opole
Victoria Września	1–0	Stal Stalowa Wola
Pogoń Świebodzin	2–1 (a.e.t.)	Włókniarz Kietrz
KS Łomianki	1–6	LKS Ceramika Opoczno
Pogoń II Szczecin	1–3	Gornik Polkowice
Orzeł Wojcieszów	1–4	Polar Wrocław

== Round 2 ==
The matches took place on 9 and 10 October 2001.

Team 1	Score	Team 2
9 October 2001
Ruch Radzionków	2–3	Wisła Kraków
Śląsk Wrocław	0–1 (a.e.t.)	Legia Warsaw
Polar Wrocław	0–4	Amica II Wronki
KSZO Ostrowiec Świętokrzyski	1–2	Odra Wodzisław
10 October 2001
Polonia Elbląg	1–3	OKS Stomil Olsztyn
Małapanew Ozimek	0–6	ŁKS Łódź
Górnik Łęczna	3–0	Zagłębie Lubin
Świt Nowy Dwór Mazowiecki	1–0	Hetman Zamość
LKS Ceramika Opoczno	0–1	Orlen Płock
Pogoń Świebodzin	2–3 (a.e.t.)	RKS Radomsko
MKS Myszków	0–2	Gornik Polkowice
Victoria Września	0–3	Dyskobolia Grodzisk Wlkp.
Górnik Zabrze	4–1	GKS Katowice
Widzew Łódź	1–0	Polonia Warsaw
Lech Poznań	0–0 (a.e.t.) (12–11 p)	Pogoń Szczecin
Odra Opole	1–2	Ruch Chorzów

== Round 3 ==
The matches took place on 10 and 11 November 2001.

Team 1	Score	Team 2
10 November 2001
Wisła Kraków	6–1	Stomil Olsztyn
Świt Nowy Dwór Mazowiecki	2–0	Górnik Łęczna
RKS Radomsko	1–2 (a.e.t.)	Legia Warsaw
Gornik Polkowice	0–1	Ruch Chorzów
Orlen Płock	3–2	Widzew Łódź
Amica Wronki	3–2	Odra Wodzisław
11 November 2001
Lech Poznań	0–2	Dyskobolia Grodzisk Wlkp.
ŁKS Łódź	2–0	Górnik Zabrze

== Quarter-finals ==
The first legs took place on 20 and 21 November, when the second legs took place on 28, 29 November and 1 December 2001.

Team 1	Agg.	Team 2	1st leg	2nd leg
Legia Warsaw	3–4	Ruch Chorzów	2–4	1–0
Orlen Płock	3–1	Świt Nowy Dwór Mazowiecki	1–0	2–1
ŁKS Łódź	3–6	Wisła Kraków	2–2	1–4
Amica Wronki	3–2	Dyskobolia Grodzisk Wlkp.	0–1	3–1

== Semi-finals ==
The first legs took place on 6 March, when the second legs took place on 9 and 10 April 2002.

Team 1	Agg.	Team 2	1st leg	2nd leg
Ruch Chorzów	1–3	Amica Wronki	1–0	0–3
Orlen Płock	1–5	Wisła Kraków	1–2	0–3

== Final ==
=== First leg ===
7 May 2002
20:00 CEST (UTC+02:00)

Amica Wronki	2–4	Wisła Kraków
Dawidowski 18'; Zieńczuk 64'	Report	Frankowski 56'; Kosowski 66', 85'; Żurawski 72'

Stadion Amica, Wronki
Attendance: 2,500
Referee: Grzegorz Gilewski (Radom)

=== Second leg ===
10 May 2002
20:00 CEST (UTC+02:00)

Wisła Kraków	4–0	Amica Wronki
Frankowski 18', 85'; Żurawski 27'; Uche 90'	Report

Stadion Miejski, Kraków
Attendance: 7,000
Referee: Jacek Granat (Warsaw)

Wisła Kraków won 8–2 on aggregate
