= Ceramika Opoczno =

Polish football club

- Full name: Miejski Klub Sportowy Ceramika Opoczno
- Founded: 1945; 81 years ago
- Ground: Stadion Ceramiki Opoczno
- Capacity: 4,700
- Chairman: Damian Leśniewski
- Manager: Marcin Pierwoła
- League: IV liga Łódź
- 2023–24: IV liga Łódź, 6th of 18
- Website: mksceramikaopoczno.pl

MKS Ceramika Opoczno is a Polish sports club from Opoczno, Łódź Voivodeship.

The club was founded as Budowlani Opoczno in 1945. Changing its name several times, the club incorporated Linia Opoczno in 1955 and KS Opoczno in 1980. The club took the name Ceramika Opoczno in 1993.

In 2003, it was renamed Stasiak Opoczno. However, the club relocated to Ostrowiec Świętokrzyski in 2004 (to reactivate KSZO Ostrowiec Świętokrzyski). Based on Opoczno's former reserve team, Woy Opoczno was operated from the summer of 2004, again taking the name Ceramika Opoczno in 2006. It is currently also known as Ceramika TERMOton Opoczno due to sponsorship of Polish brick brand TERMOton.

The men's association football team plays in the IV liga Łódź, the fifth tier of Polish football. The team reached the quarter-final of the 2002–03 Polish Cup (among others eliminating Lech Poznań), and played in the II liga.
