= RKS Radomsko =

Polish football club

- Full name: Radomszczański Klub Sportowy
- Founded: 25 August 1979; 46 years ago
- Ground: Stadion Miejski w Radomsku
- Capacity: 5,000
- Chairman: Łukasz Dryja
- Manager: vacant
- League: IV liga Łódź
- 2024–25: IV liga Łódź, 3rd of 18
- Website: www.rksradomsko.pl
Home colours	Away colours

RKS Radomsko is an association football club based in the city of Radomsko, in the south of Poland. Their home stadium is Stadion RKS. Currently, they compete in the IV liga Łódź.

== History ==
Established in 1979 by a merger of RKS Czarni Radomsko and MRKS Stal Radomsko, the club has played most of it history in the Polish fourth league, though in 1993, the club advanced to the third tier, and to the second division in 1995.

RKS Radomsko's most notable achievements is reaching the top division in the 2001–02 season, where they played considerably well in the first half of the season. In 2003, the club made it to the semi-finals of the Polish Cup, although the club has since hit harder times and, in 2005, experienced relegation from the second tier.

== Notable players ==
The club is known for the establishment of the Polish former international Jacek Krzynówek.

== Rivalries ==
Their biggest rivals are GKS Bełchatów, mostly due to the close proximity of the two clubs and many years spent in the same divisions.
