= Polish League Cup (1999–2002) =

- Founded: Summer 1999
- Abolished: Summer 2002
- Region: Poland
- Teams: 16 (1999–2000); 36 (2000–2002)
- Last champions: Legia Warsaw (1st title)
- Most championships: Polonia Warsaw (1 title); Wisła Kraków (1 title); Legia Warsaw (1 title)

The Polish League Cup (Polish: Puchar Ligi Polskiej) was a short lived cup competition in Poland spanning three editions from 1999 to 2002.

The Polish League Cup was a newly created competition to revive the League Cup in Poland, which was last cancelled 21 years prior in 1978. The competition was presented and pushed by Zbigniew Boniek and Richard Raczkowski. They wanted the competition to have a high interest from the fans and to make games competitive. They did this by giving a large financial bonus for each round the team got into, with the winner earning a total of 1.3 million PLN. The format of the competition changed between its editions. The first edition was a two-legged knockout tournament with the final being a one-off game to win the competition. The second and third editions followed the same format but included teams from the II liga and saw the finals being played over two legs.

== Polish League Cup 1999–2000 ==
The first edition of the Polish League Cup only involved those 16 teams in the Ekstraklasa with the competition being a knockout tournament with teams playing each other twice, both home and away. The final was an all Warsaw affair with the game being contested between Polonia Warsaw and Legia Warsaw, with the final being held at Legia's stadium.

=== Final ===
25 April 2000
19:00 BST

Legia Warsaw	1–2	Polonia Warsaw
Sylwester Czereszewski 38'		Igor Gołaszewski 34'; Przemysław Boldt 90'

Polish Army Stadium, Warsaw
Referee: Andrzej Czyżniewski

Polonia Warsaw won the 1999–2000 Polish League Cup.

== Polish League Cup 2000–2001 ==
The second edition saw the introduction of teams in the II liga, a move which was generally seen as positive for the competitiveness of the competition with the lower league teams often rising to the challenge of those teams in the league above. The final was contested between Zagłębie Lubin and Wisła Kraków, with this years tournament being played over a two-legged final, seeing the finalists playing both home and away.

=== First-leg ===
26 May 2001
17:00 BST

Zagłębie Lubin	0–3	Wisła Kraków
		Łukasz Sosin 32'; Olgierd Moskalewicz 33'; Ryszard Czerwiec 73'

Stadion Zagłębia Lubin, Lubin
Attendance: 1000
Referee: Grzegorz Gilewski

=== Second-leg ===
3 June 2001
15:30 BST

Wisła Kraków	1–2	Zagłębie Lubin
Tomasz Frankowski 47'		Aleksandr Osipovich 39'; Jarosław Krzyżanowski 53'

Stadion Miejski, Kraków
Attendance: 5000
Referee: Jacek Granat

Wisła Kraków won the 2000–2001 Polish League Cup winning 4–2 on aggregate.

== Polish League Cup 2001–2002 ==
The third, and what turned out to be the final Polish League Cup, was again contested between teams from the I liga and II liga. The two finalists were Legia Warsaw and Wisła Kraków, Legia being the losing finalist in the first edition, and Wisła being the winner of the previous edition.

=== First-leg ===
22 May 2002
19:00 BST

Legia Warsaw	3–0	Wisła Kraków
Tomasz Sokołowski 17'; Radosław Wróblewski 67'; Stanko Svitlica 82'

Polish Army Stadium, Warsaw
Attendance: 8000
Referee: Piotr Święs

=== Second-leg ===
26 May 2002
19:30 BST

Wisła Kraków	2–1	Legia Warsaw
Tomasz Frankowski 31'; Kamil Kosowski 52'		Moussa Yahaya 76'

Stadion Miejski, Kraków
Attendance: 7000
Referee: Ryszard Wójcik

Legia Warsaw won the 2001–2002 Polish League Cup winning 4–2 on aggregate.

== Winners and finalists ==
Team	Winners	Runners-up	Winning years
Legia Warsaw	1	1	2002
Wisła Kraków	1	1	2001
Polonia Warsaw	1	-	2000
Zagłębie Lubin	-	1	-

== Aftermath ==
As was the case with the League Cup in 1977–1978 the competition resulted in low attendances and low interest from fans. After the third edition the Polish Football Association stated that they would not be organising any further tournaments and the competition was taken off the calendar. A League Cup competition returned again in 2006 with the Ekstraklasa Cup, but that too lasted only three seasons before being taken off the footballing calendar for good.
