= Maxwell Kalu =

Nigerian footballer

Personal information
- Date of birth: 23 March 1976 (age 50)
- Place of birth: Aba, Nigeria
- Height: 1.77 m (5 ft 10 in)
- Position: Striker

Youth career
- Eagle Cement

Senior career*
Years	Team	Apps	(Gls)
1995–1997	Udoji United		
1997–2001	Amica Wronki	48	(7)
2001–2003	Widzew Łódź	21	(2)
2003	KSZO Ostrowiec Świętokrzyski	12	(0)
2003–2004	Świt Nowy Dwór Mazowiecki	10	(2)
2004	Mieszko Gniezno		
2004–2005	MKS Mława	28	(4)
2005	Zawisza Bydgoszcz (2)	16	(1)
2006	Radomiak Radom	17	(3)
2006	Odra Opole	14	(3)
2006–2007	ŁKS Łomża	21	(3)
2007	Mieszko Gniezno	7	(1)
2008–2009	Nielba Wągrowiec	33	(5)
2009–2010	Tur Turek	29	(3)
2010	Pelikan Łowicz	9	(2)
2011–2012	Świt Piotrowo		
2012–2013	1920 Mosina		
2014–2015	Pogoń Lwówek		
- * Club domestic league appearances and goals

Maxwell Kalu (born 23 March 1976 in Aba) is a Nigerian former professional footballer who played as a striker.

== Successes ==
Udoji United

- Nigeria Premier League: 1996

Amica Wronki

- Polish Cup: 1997–98, 1998–99, 1999–2000
