= Andrey Sinichin =

Belarusian footballer (born 1972)

Personal information
- Full name: Andrey Afanasyevich Sinichin
- Date of birth: 1 June 1972 (age 54)
- Place of birth: Minsk Oblast, Belarusian SSR
- Height: 1.82 m (6 ft 0 in)
- Position: Midfielder

Senior career*
Years	Team	Apps	(Gls)
1992	Stroitel Starye Dorogi	28	(2)
1993–1995	Torpedo Minsk	69	(5)
1995	Dnepr Mogilev	15	(0)
1996–1997	Stomil Olsztyn	45	(3)
1997	Torpedo Minsk	14	(0)
1998	Anzhi Makhachkala	33	(2)
1999	Amica Wronki	5	(0)
1999–2000	Jeziorak Iława		
2000–2001	Stomil Olsztyn	17	(0)
2002	Lokomotiv Minsk	30	(1)
2003	Polonia Warsaw	1	(0)
2003–2004	Smorgon	30	(3)

International career
1996	Belarus	1	(0)
- * Club domestic league appearances and goals

Andrey Afanasyevich Sinichin (Russian: Андрей Синичин; born 1 June 1972) is a Belarusian former professional footballer who played as a midfielder.

== Early life ==
Sinichin was born in 1972 in Belarus. He served in the Belarusian military.

== Career ==
Sinichin started his career with Belarusian side Starye Dorogi. In 1993, he signed for Belarusian side Torpedo. In 1995, he signed for Belarusian side Dnepr. In 1996, he signed for Polish side Stomil Olsztyn. In 1997, he returned to Belarusian side Torpedo. In 1998, he signed for Russian side Anzhi. In 1999, he signed for Polish side Amica Wronki. After that, he signed for Polish side Jeziorak Iława. In 2000, he returned to Polish side Stomil Olsztyn. In 2002, he signed for Belarusian side SKVICH. In 2003, he signed for Belarusian side Smorgon.

== Personal life ==
Sinichin is married to a Polish woman, the couple has two children together.

== Honours ==
Amica Wronki

- Polish Cup: 1998–99
