= Jarosław Bieniuk =

Polish footballer (born 1979)

Personal information
- Full name: Jarosław Paweł Bieniuk
- Date of birth: 4 June 1979 (age 47)
- Place of birth: Gdańsk, Poland
- Height: 1.92 m (6 ft 3 1/2 in)
- Position: Defender

Senior career*
Years	Team	Apps	(Gls)
1994–1995	Ogniwo Sopot		
1995–1998	Lechia Gdańsk		
1998–2006	Amica Wronki	153	(10)
2006–2008	Antalyaspor	53	(3)
2009	Omonia Nicosia	0	(0)
2009–2012	Widzew Łódź	78	(2)
2012–2014	Lechia Gdańsk	49	(0)
2017–2018	Pomorze Gdańsk	1	(0)

International career
2003–2009	Poland	8	(1)

Managerial career
- 2018–2021: Lechia Gdańsk (assistant)
- * Club domestic league appearances and goals

Jarosław Paweł Bieniuk (Polish pronunciation: [jaˈrɔswav ˈbjɛɲuk]; born 4 June 1979) is a Polish former professional footballer who played as a defender.

== Career ==
He started playing for Amica Wronki in the 1998–99 season and made his debut on 22 May 1999. In 2006, he transferred to Turkish side Antalyaspor where he played until the end of 2008. In January 2009, he signed a contract with Cypriot club AC Omonia. However, it was terminated a few weeks later and he signed with Widzew Łódź.

In July 2012, he moved from Widzew Łódź to another Polish Ekstraklasa team, his hometown club Lechia Gdańsk. On 30 July 2013, he captained Lechia Gdańsk in a friendly game against FC Barcelona, scoring a goal in a 2–2 home draw against the Spanish giants.

After the 2013–14 season, Bieniuk decided to end his professional career.

== National team ==
He has also appeared for the Poland national football team, with eight caps to his name.

=== Goals for senior national team ===
#	Date	Venue	Opponent	Score	Result	Competition
1.	11 December 2003	Ta' Qali National Stadium, Ta' Qali, Malta	Malta	0–1	0–4	International Friendly

== Personal life ==
Bieniuk was in a domestic partnership with Anna Przybylska, a Polish actress; they have one daughter Oliwia (born 2002) and two sons: Szymon (born 2006) and Jan (born 2011). They were together until Anna's death in October 2014. His son Kazimierz was born in March 2020.

== Honours ==
Amica Wronki

- Polish Cup: 1998–99, 1999–2000

Widzew Łódź

- I liga: 2008–09, 2009–10
