= Remigiusz Sobociński =

Polish association football player (born 1974)

Personal information
- Date of birth: 11 March 1974 (age 52)
- Place of birth: Iława, Poland
- Height: 1.80 m (5 ft 11 in)
- Position: Forward

Senior career*
Years	Team	Apps	(Gls)
- Jeziorak Iława
- Ewingi Zalewo
1995–1997	Jeziorak Iława		
1997–2004	Amica Wronki	165	(20)
2004–2005	→ Kujawiak Włocławek (loan)	18	(6)
2005–2008	Jagiellonia Białystok	77	(21)
2008–2009	Śląsk Wrocław	10	(0)
2009–2012	Jeziorak Iława	67	(18)
2012–2021	GKS Wikielec		
2022	Ossa Biskupiec Pomorski	11	(5)

Managerial career
- 2023–2025: Ossa Biskupiec Pomorski
- 2025: Powiśle Dzierzgoń
- * Club domestic league appearances and goals

Remigiusz Sobociński (born 11 March 1974) is a Polish football manager and former player who was most recently in charge of Powiśle Dzierzgoń.

== Career ==
In 1997, Sobociński signed for top-flight Amica Wronki from Jeziorak Iława in the lower leagues. During his seven-seasons with the club, they won the Polish Cup three consecutive seasons, finish third on two occasions and competed in the UEFA Cup, where they played against Atlético Madrid.

In 4–0 win over GKS Katowice, he recorded four assists.

In the second half of 2004–05 season, Sobociński chose to go on loan to Kujawiak Włocławek in the second league after his form was affected by insomnia due to concern about his child. After that, he received an offer from German club 1. FC Nürnberg but declined concerned about the language differences.

As of 2021, Sobociński plays for Ossa Biskupiec Pomorski in the Polish amateur leagues.

== Managerial statistics ==
As of match played 22 November 2025

Managerial record by team and tenure
Team	From	To	Record							
Team	From	To	G	W	D	L	GF	GA	GD	Win %
Ossa Biskupiec Pomorski	14 June 2023	7 October 2025	78	47	8	23	221	128	+93	60.26
Powiśle Dzierzgoń	14 October 2025	29 November 2025	7	2	1	4	8	14	−6	28.57
Total			85	49	9	27	229	142	+87	57.65

== Honours ==
Amica Wronki

- Polish Cup: 1997–98, 1998–99, 1999–2000

Śląsk Wrocław

- Ekstraklasa Cup: 2008–09

GKS Wikielec

- IV liga Warmia-Masuria: 2016–17, 2019–20
- Polish Cup (Warmia-Masuria regionals): 2012–13
