= Tomasz Dawidowski =

Polish footballer (born 1978)

Personal information
- Full name: Tomasz Gerard Dawidowski
- Date of birth: 4 February 1978 (age 48)
- Place of birth: Gdynia, Poland
- Height: 1.79 m (5 ft 10 in)
- Positions: Forward; attacking midfielder

Senior career*
Years	Team	Apps	(Gls)
1994–1998	Lechia Gdańsk	48	(14)
1998–2004	Amica Wronki	126	(36)
2004–2009	Wisła Kraków	14	(0)
2009–2012	Lechia Gdańsk	49	(2)
Total		237	(52)

International career
2001–2003	Poland	10	(1)
- * Club domestic league appearances and goals

Tomasz Gerard Dawidowski (born 4 February 1978 in Gdynia) is a Polish former professional footballer who played as a forward or attacking midfielder.

== Club career ==
Dawidowski started his career at Lechia Gdańsk. In 1998, he joined Amica Wronki. In 2004, he moved to Wisła Kraków. However, he only appeared in 14 league matches for Wisła, mostly due to injuries. He won the Ekstraklasa title in 2008–09 season. In 2009, he returned to Lechia Gdańsk.

== International career ==
Dawidowski earned ten caps and scored once for the Poland national team.

=== International goals ===
#	Date	Venue	Opponent	Score	Result	Competition
1.	6 June 2003	Poznań, Poland	Kazakhstan	2–0	3–0	Friendly

== Honours ==
Amica Wronki

- Polish Cup: 1998–99, 1999–2000
- Polish Super Cup: 1998

Wisła Kraków

- Ekstraklasa: 2008–09
