= Marek Bajor =

Polish footballer and manager

Personal information
- Full name: Marek Antoni Bajor
- Date of birth: 10 January 1970 (age 56)
- Place of birth: Kolbuszowa, [Poland
- Height: 1.83 m (6 ft 0 in)
- Position: Defender

Senior career*
Years	Team	Apps	(Gls)
1988–1989	Igloopol Kolbuszowa		
1989–1991	Igloopol Dębica		
1991–1998	Widzew Łódź	165	(7)
1998–2003	Amica Wronki	133	(3)

International career
- Poland Olympic

Managerial career
- 2006–2009: Lech Poznań (assistant)
- 2009: Zagłębie Lubin (assistant)
- 2009–2011: Zagłębie Lubin
- 2012–2018: Lech Poznań II (assistant)
- 2018: Lech Poznań (assistant)
Medal record
Representing Poland
Men's football
Olympic Games
Silver medal – second place	1992 Barcelona	Team
- * Club domestic league appearances and goals

Marek Antoni Bajor (born 10 January 1970 in Kolbuszowa) is a Polish professional football manager and former player. His sole managerial role so far came as the manager of Ekstraklasa side Zagłębie Lubin from 2009 to 2011.

== Club career ==
Bajor's career started in the 1988–89 season with Igloopol Kolbuszowa, before playing for Igloopol Dębica and Widzew Łódź. In 1998, he moved to Amica Wronki. He retired in 2002.

== International career ==
He represented his native country at the 1992 Summer Olympics in Barcelona, where he won the silver medal.

== Managerial statistics ==
As of match played 5 March 2011

Managerial record by team and tenure
Team	From	To	Record							
Team	From	To	G	W	D	L	GF	GA	GD	Win %
Zagłębie Lubin	17 December 2009	7 March 2011	39	13	15	11	44	44	+0	33.33
Total			39	13	15	11	44	44	+0	33.33

== Honours ==
Widzew Łódź

- Ekstraklasa: 1995–96, 1996–97
- Polish Super Cup: 1996

Amica Wronki

- Polish Cup: 1997–98, 1998–99, 1999–2000
- Polish Super Cup: 1998, 1999

Poland Olympic

- Olympic silver medal: 1992
