= Grzegorz Król =

Polish footballer

Personal information
- Full name: Grzegorz Król
- Date of birth: 29 April 1978 (age 48)
- Place of birth: Wschowa, Poland
- Height: 1.79 m (5 ft 10 1/2 in)
- Position: Forward

Youth career
- –1994: Polonia Gdańsk

Senior career*
Years	Team	Apps	(Gls)
1994–1996	Lechia Gdańsk	57	(10)
1997	Lech Poznań	12	(1)
1997–2003	Amica Wronki	134	(36)
2003–2004	Szczakowianka Jaworzno	27	(11)
2004–2005	GKS Bełchatów	27	(16)
2005	Polonia Warsaw	11	(0)
2006	Lechia Gdańsk	25	(6)
2007	First Vienna	8	(4)
2007	Kmita Zabierzów	16	(3)
2008	Start Otwock	5	(0)
2009	Start Otwock	2	(0)
2011–2012	Motława Suchy Dąb		
Total		324	(87)
- * Club domestic league appearances and goals

Grzegorz Król (born 29 April 1978) is a Polish former professional footballer who played as a forward. He started his career with Lechia Gdańsk aged 16, enjoying his greatest success during his six seasons with Amica Wronki, with whom he won the Polish Cup three times, and the Polish Super Cup twice. Other notable clubs Król played for were Lech Poznań, GKS Bełchatów, and Polonia Warsaw.

== Career ==
=== Lechia Gdańsk ===
In his early years Król was part of the youth teams with Polonia Gdańsk until 1994. He joined Lechia Gdańsk at the age of 16, making his league debut on 29 October 1994 aged 16 years and 6 months. During his time with Lechia the club was struggling in the league, playing 17 games and scoring 6 in the team's relegation from the II liga, and playing 30 games, scoring 2 goals, for the merger team of Olimpia-Lechia Gdańsk in the during its relegation from the I liga. After the merger split, Lechia Gdańsk took the place of the Olimpia-Lechia Gdańsk team in the II liga. Lechia Gdańsk were eventually relegated for the third time in 3 seasons, but Król left for Lech Poznan midway through his third season at Lechia, playing 10 and scoring only 2.

=== Lech Poznan ===
Król was only with Lech for 6 months, playing 11 times for the club in the I liga and scoring his only goal against Lech rivals, Legia Warsaw, as the team finished in 11th place.

=== Amica Wronki ===
Over the summer of 1997 Król joined Amica Wronki. During his first season with Amica, Król did not perform especially well, scoring only 4 goals in 29 appearances, but it was clear that Amica were entering a golden era. While the team did not particularly perform well in the league the team won the Polish Cup for the first time during the 1997–98 season, beating Aluminium Konin in the final with Król coming on as a substitute in the 55th minute, and scoring a goal in the 118th minute after the match went to extra-time. The final however was controversial, with Konin who were seen as the better team on the day were cheated out by the referee, Marek Kowalczyk, who later received a three-month ban. Amica won their first Polish Super Cup at the start of the 1998–99 season, with Król starting the match, beating ŁKS Łódź 1–0. The team also won the Polish Cup the same season beating GKS Bełchatów 1–0 in the final. The 1999–2000 season saw Amica winning the double-double, beating Wisła Kraków in both the Polish Cup and Polish Super Cup finals. In 2000, Amica Wronki's director, Ryszard Forbrich, was arrested for match fixing, and later sentenced to 3.5 years in prison after the Polish football corruption scandal came to light in 2005, with Ryszard Forbrich later admitting to match fixing, including the 1998 Polish Cup final. During the rest of his time with Amica, Król helped the team to the Polish Cup final in 2002, and to finishing 3rd in the I liga during the 2001–2002 season. During his time with Amica he won a total of 5 competitions and played 134 times scoring 36 goals.

=== Later career ===
After leaving Amica Król did not stay at another club for longer than one season. The first team he played for was with Szczakowianka Jaworzno, finishing 5th with the team in the II liga. He then played for GKS Bełchatów, helping them win promotion to the top division playing 27 and scoring 16 as the team finished 2nd. He then joined Polonia Warsaw for 6 months, playing in the top division with Polonia, but failed to score in his 11 appearances. He dropped down a division at the start of 2006 to rejoin Lechia Gdańsk, playing in the final half of the 2005–2006 season, and the first few games of the 2006–2007 season. After rejoining Lechia he made 25 appearances scoring 6 goals, with his final appearance for Lechia coming against KSZO Ostrowiec Świętokrzyski in September 2006. After Lechia he had a brief spell in Austria, with First Vienna, before going back to Poland to play for Kmita Zabierzów in 2007, and had two short spells with Start Otwock. He retired from professional football in 2009 after his second spell with Start Otwock.

== Personal life ==
In his autobiography Król admitted to having an addiction to gambling and alcohol during his playing career.

== Honours ==
Amica Wronki

- Polish Cup: 1997–98, 1998–99, 1999–2000
- Polish Super Cup: 1998, 1999

Individual

- Polish Cup top scorer: 1999–2000
- Polish League Cup top scorer: 2000–01
