= Tomasz Sokołowski (footballer, born 1977) =

Polish footballer

Personal information
- Date of birth: 27 April 1977 (age 49)
- Place of birth: Dębica, Poland
- Height: 1.75 m (5 ft 9 in)
- Position: Defender

Senior career*
Years	Team	Apps	(Gls)
1995–1996	Igloopol Dębica		
1996–2003	Amica Wronki	155	(10)
2003–2006	Legia Warsaw	64	(1)
2006	Legia Warsaw II		
2006–2010	Arka Gdynia	92	(0)
2010–2011	GKS Katowice	27	(0)

Managerial career
- 2020–2021: Legia Warsaw II
- * Club domestic league appearances and goals

Tomasz Sokołowski (born 27 April 1977) is a Polish football manager and former player, most recently in charge of Legia Warsaw II.

== Honours ==
Amica Wronki

- Polish Cup: 1997–98, 1998–99, 1999–2000
- Polish Super Cup: 1998

Legia Warsaw

- Ekstraklasa: 2005–06
