= Radosław Biliński =

Polish footballer

Personal information
- Date of birth: 27 September 1972 (age 54)
- Place of birth: Mieszkowicze, Poland
- Height: 1.75 m (5 ft 9 in)
- Position: Midfielder

Senior career*
| Years | Team | Apps | (Gls) |
| 1990–1991 | Mieszko Mieszkowice | | |
| 1991–1992 | Pogoń Szczecin | | |
| 1992–1994 | Błękitni Stargard Szczeciński | | |
| 1993 | Pogoń Szczecin | 2 | (0) |
| 1994–2001 | Amica Wronki | 137 | (9) |
| 2001–2004 | Pogoń Szczecin | 78 | (2) |
| 2004–2005 | Tortoli Calcio 1953 | | |
| 2005–2006 | Castelsardo | 19 | (0) |
| 2006–2007 | Selargius | | |
| 2007–2009 | Pogoń Szczecin | | |
| 2009–2010 | VfB Pommern Löcknitz | | |
| 2011 | Victoria 95 Przecław | | |
| 2012 | GKS Mierzyn | | |
- * Club domestic league appearances and goals

Radosław Biliński (born 27 September 1972) is a Polish former professional footballer who played as a midfielder.

== Honours ==
Amica Wronki

- Polish Cup: 1997–98, 1998–99, 1999–2000
- Polish Super Cup: 1998

Pogoń Szczecin

- II liga: 2003–04
- IV liga West Pomerania: 2007–08
