= Marek Zieńczuk =

Polish footballer

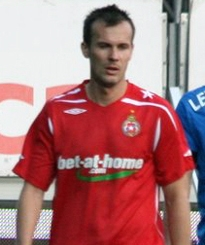
- Zieńczuk with Wisła Kraków in 2009

Personal information
- Full name: Marek Zieńczuk
- Date of birth: 24 September 1978 (age 48)
- Place of birth: Gdańsk, Poland
- Height: 1.83 m (6 ft 0 in)
- Position: Midfielder

Youth career
- Lechia Gdańsk
- Polonia Gdańsk
- Lechia Gdańsk

Senior career*
Years	Team	Apps	(Gls)
1996–1999	Lechia Gdańsk	108	(19)
2000–2004	Amica Wronki	122	(23)
2004–2009	Wisła Kraków	132	(34)
2009–2010	Skoda Xanthi	13	(2)
2010	Lechia Gdańsk	3	(0)
2011–2016	Ruch Chorzów	159	(16)
2017–2022	Pomorze Gdańsk		
2023	Tylko Lechia Gdańsk	1	(0)

International career
2002–2008	Poland	9	(0)

Managerial career
- 2017–2022: Lechia Gdańsk (youth)
- 2022–2024: Lechia Gdańsk U19
- * Club domestic league appearances and goals

Marek Zieńczuk (born 24 September 1978) is a Polish professional football manager and former player who played as a midfielder. He was most recently the assistant manager of II liga club Olimpia Grudziądz.

== Club career ==
Zieńczuk began his career at hometown club Lechia Gdańsk. Subsequently he joined Polonia Gdańsk, but quickly returned to Lechia where he made his senior debut. In 2000, he moved to Amica Wronki. Before 2004–05 season he joined Wisła Kraków. He won the Ekstraklasa championship three times with Wisła Kraków. Zieńczuk was elected the best Ekstraklasa player in the 2007–08 season by "Sport" magazine. Also, he was named to the Ekstraklasa Best XI in the 2007–08 season by other players in Polish Footballers' Association voting.

In the summer 2009, he joined Greek club Skoda Xanthi. After one season, he returned to his home country and joined Lechia Gdańsk. After a half season spell, he moved to Ruch Chorzów on a one-and-a-half-year contract.

== International career ==
Zieńczuk made nine appearances for the Poland national team.

== Career statistics ==
=== Club ===
Appearances and goals by club, season and competition
Club	Season	League			National cup (Note: Includes Polish Cup, Greek Cup)		Europe		Other		Total	
Club	Season	Division	Apps	Goals	Apps	Goals	Apps	Goals	Apps	Goals	Apps	Goals
Lechia Gdańsk	1996–97	II liga West	30	2	1	0	—		—		31	2
Lechia Gdańsk	1997–98	III liga, gr. II	34	9	1	0	—		—		35	9
Lechia Gdańsk	1998–99	II liga West	21	3	2	1	—		—		23	4
Lechia Gdańsk	1999–2000	II liga	23	5	2	0	—		—		25	5
Lechia Gdańsk	Total		108	19	6	1	—		—		114	20
Amica Wronki	1999–2000	Ekstraklasa	14	0	7	1	—		—		21	1
Amica Wronki	2000–01	Ekstraklasa	26	1	1	0	6 (Note: Appearances in UEFA Cup/Europa League)	2	4 (Note: Three appearances and one goal in Polish League Cup, one appearance in Polish Super Cup)	1	37	4
Amica Wronki	2001–02	Ekstraklasa	28	6	8	1	—		2 (Note: Appearances in Polish League Cup)	1	38	8
Amica Wronki	2002–03	Ekstraklasa	28	8	2	0	6	1	—		36	9
Amica Wronki	2003–04	Ekstraklasa	26	8	3	0	—		—		29	8
Amica Wronki	Total		122	23	21	2	12	3	6	2	161	30
Wisła Kraków	2004–05	Ekstraklasa	24	8	10	4	5 (Note: Three appearances in UEFA Champions League, two appearances in UEFA Cup)	0	—		39	12
Wisła Kraków	2005–06	Ekstraklasa	27	8	2	0	4 (Note: Two appearances in UEFA Champions League, two appearances in UEFA Cup)	0	—		33	8
Wisła Kraków	2006–07	Ekstraklasa	23	0	1	0	8	1	8 (Note: Appearance(s) in Ekstraklasa Cup)	1	40	2
Wisła Kraków	2007–08	Ekstraklasa	28	16	5	1	—		1	0	34	17
Wisła Kraków	2008–09	Ekstraklasa	30	2	4	1	5 (Note: Three appearances in UEFA Champions League, two appearances in UEFA Cup)	0	4	2	43	5
Wisła Kraków	Total		132	34	22	6	22	1	13	3	189	44
Skoda Xanthi	2009–10	Super League	13	2	1	0	—		—		14	2
Lechia Gdańsk	2010–11	Ekstraklasa	3	0	0	0	—		—		3	0
Lechia Gdańsk II	2010–11	III liga, gr. D	2	0	—		—		—		2	0
Ruch Chorzów	2010–11	Ekstraklasa	14	1	0	0	—		—		14	1
Ruch Chorzów	2011–12	Ekstraklasa	26	6	4	1	—		—		30	7
Ruch Chorzów	2012–13	Ekstraklasa	24	3	3	0	4	0	—		31	3
Ruch Chorzów	2013–14	Ekstraklasa	27	3	0	0	—		—		27	3
Ruch Chorzów	2014–15	Ekstraklasa	36	1	1	0	5	1	—		42	2
Ruch Chorzów	2015–16	Ekstraklasa	32	2	1	0	—		—		33	2
Ruch Chorzów	Total		159	16	9	1	9	1	—		177	18
Ruch Chorzów II	2013–14	III liga, gr. F	1	0	—		—		—		1	0
Career total			540	94	59	10	43	5	19	5	661	114

=== International ===
Appearances and goals by national team and year
National team	Year	Apps	Goals
Poland
Poland	2002	1	0
Poland	2004	3	0
Poland	2005	2	0
Poland	2007	1	0
Poland	2008	2	0
Total		9	0

== Honours ==
Amica Wronki

- Polish Cup: 1999–2000

Wisła Kraków

- Ekstraklasa: 2004–05, 2007–08, 2008–09

Individual

- Ekstraklasa Player of the Year: 2007
- Ekstraklasa Best Player by "Sport": 2007–08
- Ekstraklasa Best XI: 2007–08
