= Wronki Stadium =

Football stadium in Wronki, Poland

- Stadion Wronki
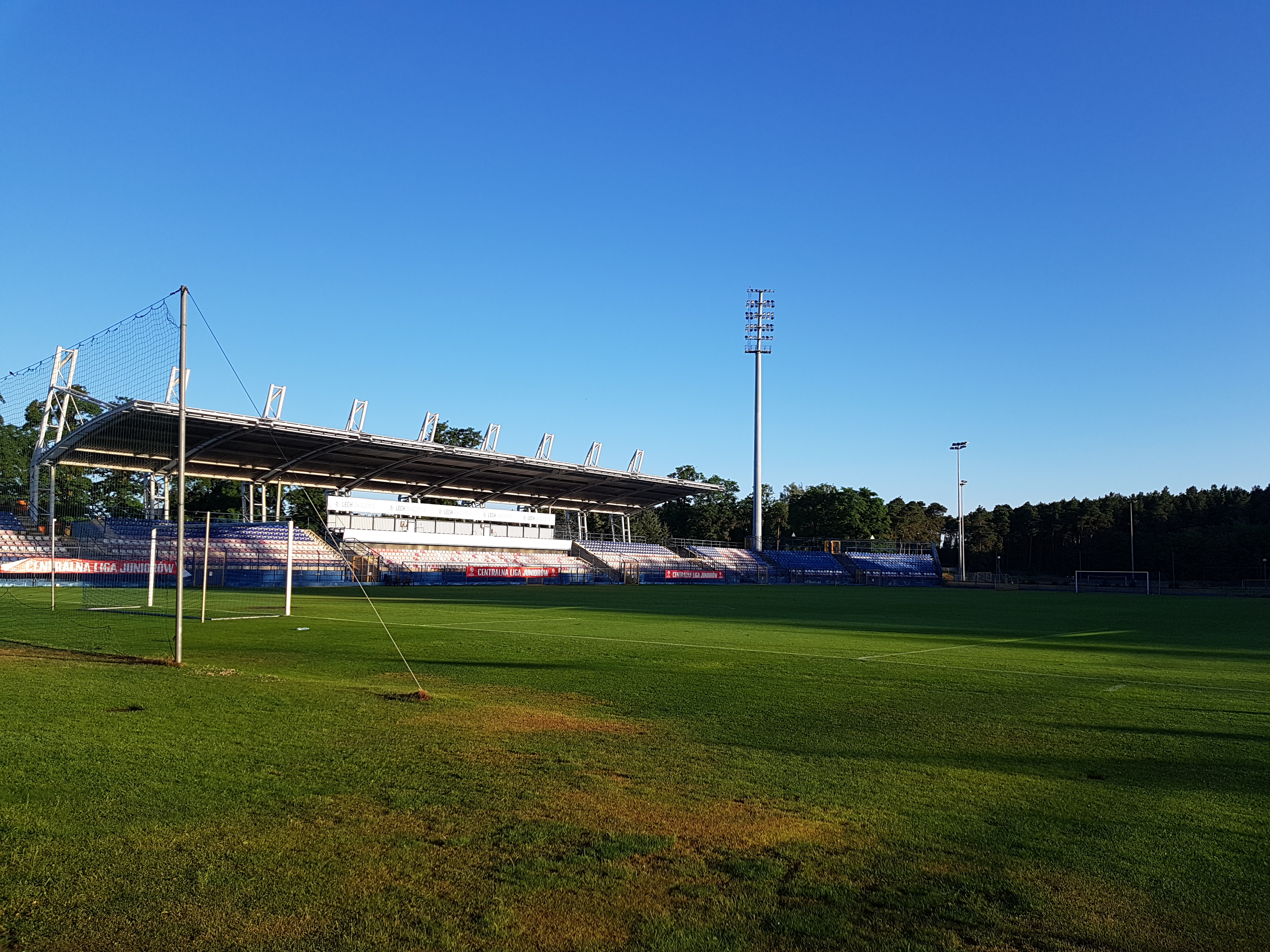
- Interactive map of Wronki Stadium
- Full name: KKS Lech Poznań Academy Stadium in Wronki (Polish: Stadion Akademii KKS Lech Poznań we Wronkach)
- Former names: Amica Wronki Stadium (Polish: Stadion Amiki Wronki)
- Address: ul. Leśna 15a 64-510; Wronki; Poland
- Coordinates: 52.719722°N 16.374167°E
- Capacity: 4624
- Surface: Grass
- Field size: 105 m × 70 m (344 ft × 230 ft)

Construction
- Built: 1991
- Opened: 1992
- Renovated: 2004; 2009; 2022

Tenants
- Amica Wronki (1992–2006); Błękitni Wronki (2007–); Lech Poznań (2009, 2011); Lech Poznań II (2013–)

Wronki Stadium (Polish: Stadion Wronki) formally KKS Lech Poznań Academy Stadium in Wronki (Polish: Stadion Akademii KKS Lech Poznań we Wronkach), and previously called Amica Wronki Stadium (Polish: Stadion Amiki Wronki) is a football stadium in Wronki, Greater Poland.

It was initially built and used by the now defuct Amica Wronki, who played for many years in the Ekstraklasa, hosted the 2000 Polish Cup final and Amica's European matches (UEFA Cup and UEFA Cup Winners' Cup).

After Amica's dissolution in 2007, the stadium was taken over by Lech Poznań, who used the stadium during periods when its own stadium was being rebuilt. Since then, Lech uses the stadium as its academy and research base, and is the current stadium of its reserve and senior academy team.

== Facilities ==
It is part of a sports and recreation complex where the Poland national football team often trains. In 2004, the stadium underwent renovation and meets all UEFA requirements. The stadium features 1400 lux-strength lighting and under-soil heating, and is surrounded by a hotel, conference center, pub, and restaurant.

== Renovations ==
In early 2009, temporary stands were added to increase capacity by nearly two thousand seats due to Lech Poznań's matches at the Amica Stadium.

In November 2022, a 55 million zł investment was completed, built a new Research-Development Centre.

== Matches ==
From 1995 to 2006, the stadium hosted Ekstraklasa matches featuring Amica Wronki. On 9 June 2000, the second leg of the Polish Cup final was played here, with Amica defeating Wisła Kraków 3–0 to win the trophy. At the start of the 2009–10 season, Lech Poznań also played Ekstraklasa matches here due to the renovation of the Poznań Stadium. The stadium also hosted qualifying and main rounds of the UEFA Cup Winners' Cup and UEFA Cup with Amica's participation, including group stage matches in the 2004–05 season, as well as UEFA Cup qualifiers in the 2009–10 season featuring Lech.
