= Sparta Szamotuły =

Polish association football club

- Full name: Miejski Klub Sportowy Sparta Szamotuły
- Founded: April 1922; 103 years ago
- Ground: Stanisław Kurowski Stadium
- Capacity: 2,237
- Chairman: Maciej Bździel
- Manager: Sławomir Dyzert
- League: V liga Greater Poland I
- 2024–25: V liga Greater Poland I, 5th of 16
Home colours

MKS Sparta Szamotuły is a Polish association football club, from Szamotuły, Greater Poland.

== History ==
MKS Sparta Szamotuły was founded in April 1922. Initially, the club was called the Szamotulskie Koło Sportowe. Since its foundation of the present day, the white-blue-red colours of the club have remained unchanged. The first created sports section, the football section, has existed continuously to this day, with the first competitions in which the club officially participated played since 1923 in the municipal divisions.

Throughout its history, the club repeatedly changed the name. For the first time in June 1926 to Jutrzenka Szamotuły, but after six years returned to the original name. Another change to the Cukrowniczy Związkowy Szamotulski Klub Sportowy took place in 1949. Then over the years from 1950 until 1957, the club changed the name consecutively to; Związkowiec Szamotuły, Koło Sportowe Unia, Koło Sportowe nr. 343 Spójnia, Koło Sportowe Sparta before finally at the end of 1957 participate under the Sparta name.

Another change of name to Międzyzakładowy Klub Sportowy, came after twenty years in the spring of 1972, and presided of the club's most successful era until 1996, when the government changed the name to Klub Sportowy Sparta Szamotuły. The last name change took place in 2007 adding Miejski to its name which remains to this day.

The club's most successful era were the six seasons in the third division in the years 1976–1977, 1977–1978, 1978–1979, 1985–1986, 1987-1988 and 1988–1989. The fans remember in 1976, when for the first and only time in the history of the club players were faced with a chance of promotion to the second division. In the battle for promotion the players had to contend with Unia Racibórz, Górnik Knurów and Górnik Wałbrzych. Eventually out of the four, Górnik Wałbrzych won promotion, which meant Sparta remained in the same division.

In 1986–87 season they reached the 1/16 of the Polish Cup, eventually losing 0–2 to Pogoń Szczecin. They beat both Arkonia Szczecin and Olimpia Poznań 2–0 in the 1st and 2nd rounds respectively, and beat Stal Stocznia Szczecin 1–0 in the 3rd.

== Naming history ==
The club has undergone many name changes, especially during the 1950s, a common occurrence for Polish clubs at the time.

- Szamotulski KS (April 1922 → 1926)
- Jutrzenka Szamotuły (1926 → ?)
- KS Szamotuły (? → 1932)
- Szamotulski KS (1932 → 1949)
- Cukrowniczy Związkowy Szamotulski KS (1949 → ?)
- Związkowiec Szamotuły (? → ?)
- Koło Sportowe Unia (? → ?)
- Koło Sportowe nr 343 Spójnia (? → ?)
- Koło Sportowe Sparta (? → 1957)
- KS Sparta (1957 → 1972)
- Międzyzakładowy KS Sparta (1972 → 1996)
- KS Sparta (1996 → January 2008)
- Miejski KS Sparta (January 2008 – present )

== Stadium ==
The club since its founding in 1922 has played uninterrupted at the ul. Sportowa 6 address (6 Sports Street) in Szamotuły, where the local OSiR sports centre is located. In September 2012, to celebrate the club's 90th anniversary the stadium was named after Stanisław Kurowski, who was the manager of the boxing section as well as the football team, in which he played himself as well, and took the Sparta youth team to the national finals in 1953.

The stadium is equipped with a pitch with dimensions of 105 x 68 m and two side training pitches. The main stadium has 2337 plastic seats and a covered grandstand at the clubhouse. Currently, Sparta provides 990 seats for their matches. on the so-called west tribune, on the west side of the clubhouse, as the club does not possess a "mass-gathering" licence which is required to organise events with an attendance higher than 999.

== Fans ==
Sparta has a small but loyal group of active fans who support the club.

Their biggest rival is unquestionably Błękitni Wronki, known as the Szamotuły County Derby. The rivalry also carried on as Błękitni became Amica Wronki, but since 30 May 1976 when Sparta beat Błękitni 10–0 away from home the teams met only sporadically, since Amica went on to play in the Ekstraklasa. Since Amica's disbandment and Błękitni's re-founding the rivalry has been renewed in the lower leagues.
