= Piotr Reiss =

Polish footballer (born 1972)

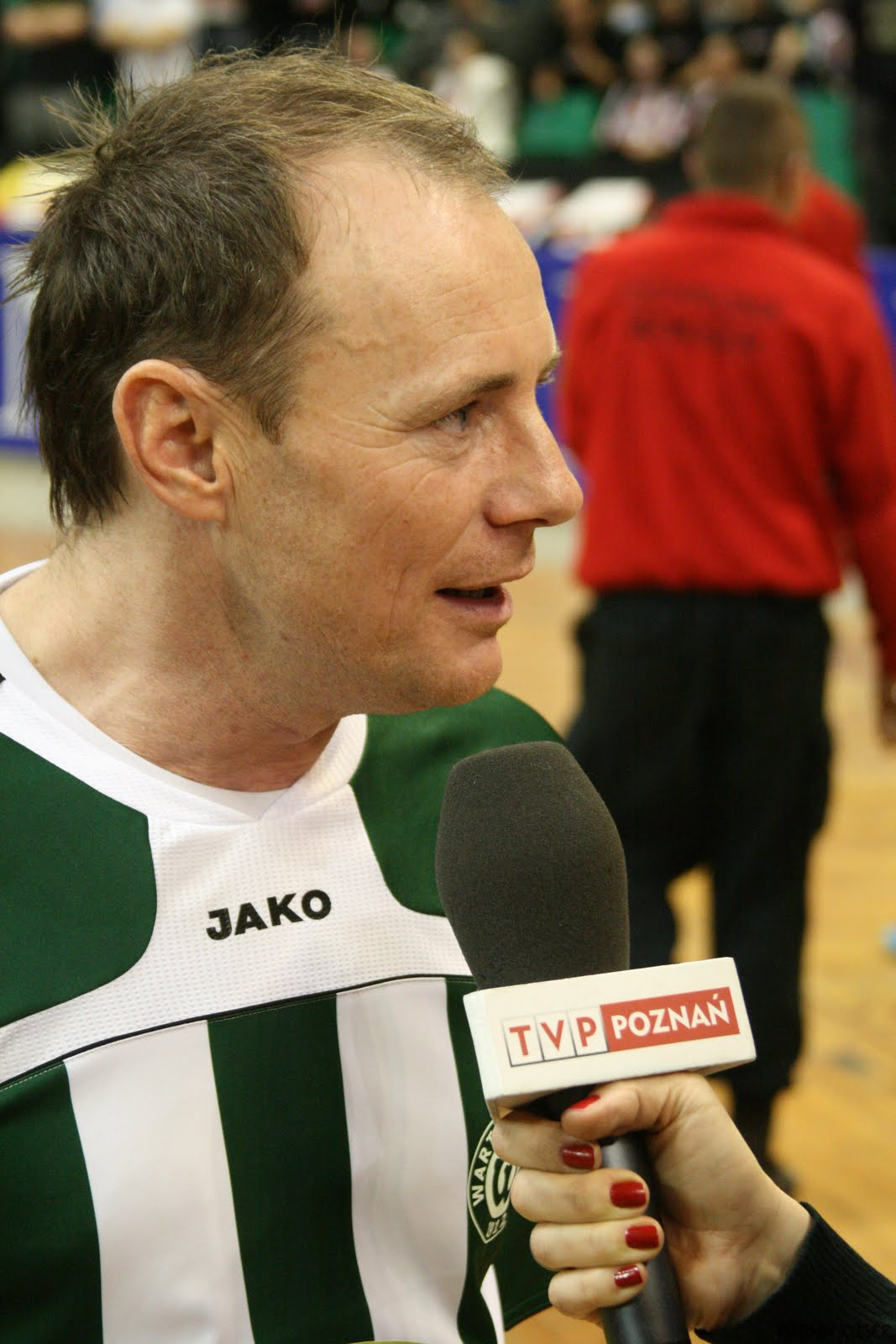
- Reiss in 2011

Personal information
- Full name: Piotr Reiss
- Date of birth: 20 June 1972 (age 54)
- Place of birth: Poznań, Poland
- Height: 1.78 m (5 ft 10 in)
- Position: Striker

Youth career
- 1981–1990: Lech Poznań

Senior career*
Years	Team	Apps	(Gls)
1990–1991	Lech Poznań	0	(0)
1991–1993	Kotwica Kórnik		
1993–1994	Amica Wronki		
1994–1998	Lech Poznań	146	(50)
1999–2001	Hertha BSC	16	(1)
1999–2000	→ MSV Duisburg (loan)	22	(5)
2001	Greuther Fürth	9	(0)
2002–2009	Lech Poznań	187	(62)
2009–2012	Warta Poznań	93	(35)
2012–2013	Lech Poznań	8	(1)

International career
1998–2000	Poland	4	(1)

Managerial career
- 2014: Tarnovia Tarnowo Podgórne
- * Club domestic league appearances and goals

Piotr Reiss (Polish pronunciation: [ˈpjɔtr ˈrɛjs]; born 20 June 1972) is a Polish former professional footballer who played as a striker. He is widely regarded as a Lech Poznań all-time favourite and achieved legendary status among fans, having captained them for many years and being an ardent fan of the club himself.

== Club career ==
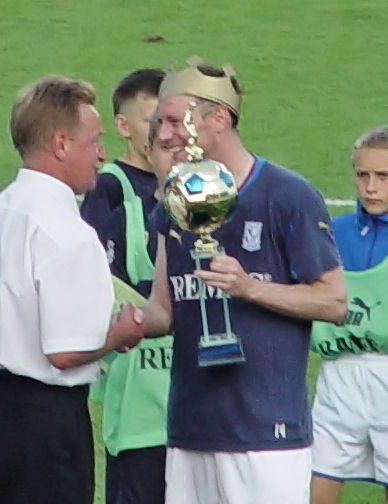
Ekstraklasa top scorer (2006–07)

Born in Poznań, Reiss is one of Lech Poznań's most notable players ever. He had a spell in German clubs but he claimed that it was so that he could help out Lech Poznań financially through the transfer fee they received for him, as at the time the club was struggling financially.

He captained Lech for many years after he returned from Germany.

Towards the end of his career, wanting to stay in his hometown, he went to play for Poznań's second professional team, I liga side Warta, scoring 35 goals, before returning to Lech in order to enjoy a farewell season with his favourite club in 2012. On 21 April 2013, at the age of 40 years and 305 days, he became the oldest recorded goalscorer in Ekstraklasa's history after scoring in a 3–1 home win against Zagłębie Lubin. He retired at the end of the season, with a total of 109 goals in Polish top division.

== International career ==
Reiss featured for the Poland national team. Reiss' debut for Poland took place on 10 November 1998 in an away game against Slovakia, scoring the opening goal. In total, he earned four caps and one goal.

== Post-playing career ==
After retiring from football, he became a youth coach, establishing a youth football academy called Akademia Reissa, which trains hundreds of children and co-operated with Lech's youth system.

== Career statistics ==
=== Club ===
Appearances and goals by club, season and competition
Club	Season	League			National cup (Note: Includes Polish Cup, DFB-Pokal)		League cup (Note: Includes DFL-Ligapokal, Polish League Cup, Ekstraklasa Cup)		Europe		Total	
Club	Season	Division	Apps	Goals	Apps	Goals	Apps	Goals	Apps	Goals	Apps	Goals
Lech Poznań	1994–95	Ekstraklasa	34	9	3	1	—		—		37	10
Lech Poznań	1995–96	Ekstraklasa	30	6	2	1	—		—		32	7
Lech Poznań	1996–97	Ekstraklasa	33	12	1	0	—		—		34	12
Lech Poznań	1997–98	Ekstraklasa	34	11	3	1	—		—		37	12
Lech Poznań	1998–99	Ekstraklasa	15	12	1	1	—		—		16	13
Lech Poznań	Total		146	50	10	0	—		—		156	54
Hertha BSC	1998–99	Bundesliga	10	1	0	0	—		—		10	1
Hertha BSC	2000–01	Bundesliga	6	0	1	0	1	0	1 (Note: Appearance(s) in UEFA Cup)	1	9	1
Hertha BSC	Total		16	1	1	0	1	0	1	1	19	2
MSV Duisburg (loan)	1999–2000	Bundesliga	22	5	0	0	—		0	0	22	5
Greuther Fürth	2001–02	2. Bundesliga	9	0	2	0	—		—		11	0
Lech Poznań	2001–02	II liga	13	4	0	0	2	0	—		15	4
Lech Poznań	2002–03	Ekstraklasa	27	4	3	2	—		—		30	6
Lech Poznań	2003–04	Ekstraklasa	26	13	8	8	—		—		34	21
Lech Poznań	2004–05	Ekstraklasa	26	9	10	5	—		2	0	38	14
Lech Poznań	2005–06	Ekstraklasa	28	11	8	0	—		3 (Note: Appearance(s) in UEFA Intertoto Cup)	0	39	11
Lech Poznań	2006–07	Ekstraklasa	28	15	3	1	3	2	1	0	35	18
Lech Poznań	2007–08	Ekstraklasa	24	5	1	0	2	0	—		27	5
Lech Poznań	2008–09	Ekstraklasa	15	1	2	0	4	0	5	1	26	2
Lech Poznań	Total		187	62	35	16	11	2	11	1	244	81
Warta Poznań	2009–10	I liga	33	16	0	0	—		—		33	16
Warta Poznań	2010–11	I liga	29	9	1	0	—		—		30	9
Warta Poznań	2011–12	I liga	31	10	1	0	—		—		32	10
Warta Poznań	Total		93	35	2	0	—		—		95	35
Lech Poznań	2012–13	Ekstraklasa	8	1	—		—		—		8	1
Career total			481	154	50	20	12	2	12	2	555	178

=== International ===
Appearances and goals by national team and year
National team	Year	Apps	Goals
Poland
Poland	1998	1	1
Poland	1999	1	0
Poland	2000	2	0
Total		4	1

Scores and results list Poland's goal tally first, score column indicates score after each Reiss goal.

List of international goals scored by Piotr Reiss
No.	Date	Venue	Opponent	Score	Result	Competition
1	10 November 1998	Tehelné pole, Bratislava, Slovakia	Slovakia	1–0	3–1	Friendly

== Managerial statistics ==
As of match played 27 November 2014

Managerial record by team and tenure
Team	From	To	Record							
Team	From	To	G	W	D	L	GF	GA	GD	Win %
Tarnovia Tarnowo Podgórne	10 October 2014	10 December 2014	9	2	1	6	13	21	−8	22.22
Total			9	2	1	6	13	21	−8	22.22

== Honours ==
Lech Poznań

- II liga: 2001–02
- Polish Cup: 2003–04, 2008–09
- Polish Super Cup: 2004

Individual

- Ekstraklasa Player of the Year: 2006
- Ekstraklasa top scorer: 2006–07
- Polish Cup top scorer: 2003–04
