= 2003–04 Polish Cup =

Tournament details
- Country: Poland
- Teams: 50

Final positions
- Champions: Lech Poznań
- Runners-up: Legia Warsaw

Tournament statistics
- Matches played: 53
- Goals scored: 171 (3.23 per match)
- Top goal scorer(s): Piotr Reiss (8 goals)

The 2003–04 Polish Cup was the fiftieth season of the annual Polish cup competition. It began on 26 July 2003 with the preliminary round and ended on 1 June 2004 with second leg of the final, played at Stadion Wojska Polskiego, Warsaw. The winners qualified for the second qualifying round of the UEFA Cup. Wisła Kraków were the defending champions.

== Preliminary round ==
The matches took place on 26 July 2003.

Team 1	Score	Team 2
26 July 2003
Śląsk Wrocław	w/o^{1}	Stomil Olsztyn
Ruch Radzionków	3–2	Hetman Zamość

Notes

- Note 1: Stomil Olsztyn withdrew from the competition.

== Round 1 ==
The matches took place on 29 July 2003.

Team 1	Score	Team 2
29 July 2003
Gryf Wejherowo	1–5	Arka Gdynia
Chemik/Zawisza Bydgoszcz	0–3	Górnik Polkowice
Flota Świnoujście	1–0	ŁKS Łódź
Lech II Poznań	1–3	Aluminium Konin
Raków Częstochowa	1–1 (a.e.t.) (4–2 p)	Podbeskidzie Bielsko-Biała
Promień Żary	1–0 (a.e.t.)	Śląsk Wrocław
Karkonosze Jelenia Góra	1–0	Ruch Radzionków
Odra II Opole	3–3 (a.e.t.) (4–3 p)	Polar Wrocław
Pogoń Siedlce	1–7	Pogoń Szczecin
Ceramika Paradyż	2–2 (a.e.t.) (4–3 p)	Świt Nowy Dwór Mazowiecki
Jagiellonia Białystok	1–0	Ceramica/Stasiak Opoczno
Olimpia Elbląg	0–5	GKS Bełchatów
Sandecja Nowy Sącz	0–1	Stal Stalowa Wola
Korona Kielce	3–1	Górnik Łęczna
Strug Tyczyn	1–3 (a.e.t.)	RKS Radomsko
Lublinianka Lublin	0–1	Tłoki Gorzyce

== Round 2 ==
The matches took place on 2 and 20 August 2003.

Team 1	Score	Team 2
2 August 2003
Arka Gdynia	2–0	Wisła Kraków
Górnik Polkowice	6–0	KSZO Ostrowiec Świętokrzyski
Flota Świnoujście	2–1 (a.e.t.)	Widzew Łódź
Aluminium Konin	2–0	Szczakowianka Jaworzno
Promień Żary	2–7	Górnik Zabrze
Karkonosze Jelenia Góra	0–3	Lech Poznań
Odra II Opole	2–1	Wisła Płock
Pogoń Szczecin	1–0 (a.e.t.)	Dyskobolia Grodzisk Wlkp.
Ceramika Paradyż	0–4	Odra Wodzisław
Jagiellonia Białystok	2–1 (a.e.t.)	Zagłębie Lubin
GKS Bełchatów	1–3	Amica Wronki
Stal Stalowa Wola	1–3	GKS Katowice
Korona Kielce	2–0	Ruch Chorzów
RKS Radomsko	1–4	Polonia Warsaw
20 August 2003
Tłoki Gorzyce	1–3	Legia Warsaw

== Round 3 ==
The matches took place on 16 and 17 September 2003.

Team 1	Score	Team 2
16 September 2003
Górnik Zabrze	0–2	Legia Warsaw
Jagiellonia Białystok	1–0 (a.e.t.)	Pogoń Szczecin
17 September 2003
Odra II Opole	1–2	Górnik Polkowice
Polonia Warsaw	1–2	Lech Poznań
Arka Gdynia	0–1	GKS Katowice
Flota Świnoujście	3–4	Amica Wronki
Raków Częstochowa	2–1	Aluminium Konin
Korona Kielce	1–0	Odra Wodzisław

== Quarter-finals ==
The first legs took place on 30 September and 1 October, when the second legs took place on 21 and 22 October 2003.

Team 1	Agg.	Team 2	1st leg	2nd leg
GKS Katowice	4–1	Amica Wronki	3–0	1–1
Jagiellonia Białystok	8–1	Raków Częstochowa	3–0	5–1
Korona Kielce	1–3	Legia Warsaw	1–1	0–2
Górnik Polkowice	1–4	Lech Poznań	0–0	1–4

== Semi-finals ==
The first legs took place on 7 and 13 April, when the second legs took place on 14 and 22 April 2004.

Team 1	Agg.	Team 2	1st leg	2nd leg
GKS Katowice	3–6	Lech Poznań	1–2	2–4
Jagiellonia Białystok	0–3	Legia Warsaw	0–3^{1}	0–0

Notes

- The game was stopped in the 81st minute when the score was 2–0 and then was awarded 3–0 to Legia.

== Final ==
=== First leg ===
18 May 2004
19:30 CEST (UTC+02:00)

Lech Poznań	2–0	Legia Warsaw
Reiss 17', 35'	Report

Stadion Miejski, Poznań
Attendance: 26,000
Referee: Krzysztof Słupik (Tarnów)

=== Second leg ===
1 June 2004
20:15 CEST (UTC+02:00)

Legia Warsaw	1–0	Lech Poznań
Włodarczyk 68' (pen.)	Report

Stadion Wojska Polskiego, Warsaw
Attendance: 15,000
Referee: Antoni Fijarczyk (Stalowa Wola)

Lech Poznań won 2–1 on aggregate
