= Cezary Baca =

Polish association football player

Personal information
- Date of birth: 25 April 1969 (age 57)
- Place of birth: Olsztyn, Poland
- Height: 1.72 m (5 ft 8 in)
- Position: Striker

Senior career*
Years	Team	Apps	(Gls)
- DKS Dobre Miasto
- Warmia Olsztyn
- Orlęta Reszel
–1991	SKS Szczytno		
1991–1993	Stomil Olsztyn		
1995	Jeziorak Iława		
1996–1997	VPS	26	(5)
1997–1998	Warmia Olsztyn		
1998	Jeziorak Iława		
2011	GLKS Jonkowo		
- * Club domestic league appearances and goals

Cezary Baca (born 25 April 1969) is a Polish former footballer who played as a striker.

== Career ==
Baca started his career with Polish sixth tier side DKS Dobre Miasto. After that, he signed for SKS Szczytno in the Polish third tier. In 1991, Baca signed for Polish second-tier club Stomil Olsztyn, helping them earn promotion to the Polish top flight, where he made 33 appearances and scored 8 goals.

Before the 1996 season, he signed for VPS in Finland. In 1997, Baca signed for Polish second-tier team Warmia Olsztyn. In 2010, he signed for GLKS Jonkowo in the Polish seventh tier, helping them earn promotion to the Polish sixth tier.
