= Jan Durka =

Polish footballer (1903-1958)

Personal information
- Date of birth: 10 March 1903
- Place of birth: Popowo, German Empire
- Date of death: 17 March 1958 (aged 55)
- Place of death: Łódź, Poland
- Height: 1.66 m (5 ft 5 in)
- Position: Forward

Senior career*
Years	Team	Apps	(Gls)
- WKS Lublin
1921–1934	ŁKS Łódź		

International career
1926	Poland	1	(0)
- * Club domestic league appearances and goals

Jan Durka (10 March 1903 – 17 March 1958) was a Polish footballer who played as a forward.

He earned one cap for the Poland national team in 1926.
