= Tomasz Sokolowski =

Tomasz Sokolowski may refer to:

- Tomasz Sokołowski (footballer, born 1970), Polish footballer and manager
- Tomasz Sokołowski (footballer, born 1977), Polish footballer and manager
- Tomasz Sokolowski (footballer, born 1985), Polish-born Norwegian footballer
