= Błękitni Wronki =

- Full name: Miejski Klub Sportowy Błękitni Wronki
- Founded: 1921; 105 years ago (as Wrona Wronki); 2007; 19 years ago (re-founded)
- Ground: Stadion Amica, Wronki; OSiR stadium, Popowo (temporary)
- Capacity: 5,296
- Chairman: Marek Pogorzelczyk

MKS Błękitni Wronki is a Polish association football club from Wronki, Greater Poland. The original Błękitni Wronki was created in 1921 and played until 1992. Błękitni then merged with Wromet Wróblewo and became Amica Wronki. In 2007, in response to Amica's disbandment, it was decided to rebuild the Błękitni club, as a phoenix club.

== History ==
=== Foundation till merger ===
Błękitni Wronki was founded in 1921 and excluding major interruptions, such as World War II, the club played until 1992.

The origins of football in Wronki date back to 1921. The first football club in Wronki was "KS Wrona". Throughout the twentieth century, the name of the club changed several times: Wrona (1921-1924), Kresowianka (1924-1935), Polonia (1936-1938), Strzelec (from June until September 1938), Harcerski Klub Sportowy (1938–1939), Kolejarz (1945-1950), Stal (1950–1953), Spójnia (1953-1956), Sparta (1956–1959), before finally MKS Błękitni (1959–1992). In matches were played in various places – from 1945 to 1947 games were played near Olszynek; from 1948 to 1955 on the "Trynka" pitch behind the railway bridge; and since 1955 at the Leśna Street stadium.

The grandfather of former MKS "Błękitni" Vice President Artur Hibner – Boleslaw, co-founded local football in Wronki before World War II, and created it after 1945. In 1967, he brought to Wronki, among others, the famous coach Henryk Czapczyk, a Polish footballer, coach, player of both of the famous Poznań clubs Warta and Lech, Polish title winner, an Army soldier, and a member of the Warsaw Uprising; Czapczyk was the "C" in the famous "ABC" trio of Lech strikers alongside Teodor Anioła and Edmund Białas, and was considered the most technically skilled of the three. The father of Artur Hibner - Andrzej, as vice president (until 1992) of Błękitni Wronki negotiated on 3 July 1992 with the secretary of the club, Witold Bartoszewski on the merger of the club with FK Wromet Wronki (later LZS Czarni Wromet Wróblewo). The merger became Amica Wronki.

=== Amica Wronki ===
Unofficially, the fans considered Amica only an episode of Błękitni's history, due to the way in which Amica was founded, they played in the same stadium, and the squad was based on Błękitni players. Another factor was that name changes were common throughout the club's history, and therefore continues, inter alia, its tradition.

The history of SSA Amica Sport goes back to 1992 when the Amica company wanted to sponsor a football team in the town of Wronki where their factory was located. The company's increasing profits gave the new team tremendous financial clout in the Polish leagues. The club was formed when two clubs were joined, Błękitni Wronki and LZS Czarni Wromet Wróblewo. The new club was named FK Amica Wronki and in four years, the club won promotion from the Fourth Division to the Ekstraklasa. They have been in the top division in Poland since 1995. In May 2006 they merged with fellow top-flight team Lech Poznań, and a year later, the reserve team which then had become the first team as a result, withdrew from the league and the club ceased to exist.

=== Re-birth ===
MKS Błękitni Wronki was created on 3 August 2007. Including as a response to "vacuum", which was created after the disappearance of the primary and third tier football club Amica Wronki. MKS creators were Artur Hibner and Grzegorz Sobkowski.

Błękitni played mostly in the regional league, the sixth, and later seventh, tier, having previously been promoted every year since beginning from the bottom of the football pyramid. In the league, the club has competed against Sparta Szamotuły and Sokół Pniewy. Earlier the club faced Dyskobolia Grodzisk Wielkopolski, which has a rich top flight past. Unfortunately the Wronki club must play matches in Popowo, but according to its activists, it is likely that in the future this will change. At the beginning of 2012, there has been a change in the management of the club. Błękitni Wronki is currently based primarily on its youth football teams, the junior Błękitni sides successfully play against the best teams of Greater Poland, and sometimes even in the country.

=== Junior teams only ===
In July 2023, Błękitni temporarily ceased operating a senior team after being unable to complete a roster.

== Fans ==
Amica and Błękitni fans have the same core group of supporters, as they see themselves as a continuation of one another, and therefore the rivalries are the same regardless which club the fans went to see throughout history.

As the club is from Greater Poland, as many smaller clubs in the region, the fans originally sympathised with the regional powerhouse Lech Poznań, however Amica's controversial absorption into (/merger with) Lech has caused bad blood.

Even before Amica's existence, the fans from Wronki had a fierce rivalry with Sparta Szamotuły, with whom they contest the Szamotuły County Derby, however since 30 May 1976 when Sparta beat Błękitni 10–0 away from home the teams met only sporadically, since Amica went on to play in the Ekstraklasa. Since Amica's disbandment and Błękitni's re-founding the rivalry has been renewed in the lower leagues

The club also developed a strong rivalry with Dyskobolia Grodzisk Wielkopolski during the Amica years, but since Dyskobolia's similar fate to that of Amica (taken over by Polonia Warsaw) both Błękitni and Dyskobolia have renewed their rivalry in the lower leagues.

In its heyday, when Amica played in continental competitions, their fans had good relations with Servette Geneva and a close friendship with fans of NEC Nijmegen after meeting them in a UEFA Cup game.

== Naming history ==
The club underwent several name changes:

- (1921) – Wrona Wronki
- (1924) – Kresowianka Wronki
- (1936) – Polonia Wronki
- (June 1938) – Strzelec Wronki
- (September 1938) – Harcerski Klub Sportowy Wronki
- (1945) – Kolejarz Wronki
- (1950) – Stal Wronki
- (1953) – Spójnia Wronki
- (1956) – Sparta Wronki
- (1959) – Błękitni Wronki
- (1992-2007) – Defunct (existed as part of Amica Wronki)
- (2007) – Błękitni Wronki (refounded)
