= Grzegorz Piechna =

Polish footballer

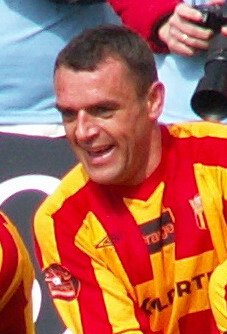
- Piechna with Korona Kielce in 2006

Personal information
- Date of birth: 18 September 1976 (age 50)
- Place of birth: Opoczno, Poland
- Height: 1.81 m (5 ft 11 in)
- Position: Forward

Senior career*
Years	Team	Apps	(Gls)
1997–1998	Woy Bukowiec Opoczyński	34	(58)
1998–1999	Ceramika Opoczno	12	(3)
2000	Pelikan Łowicz		
2001–2003	Ceramika Paradyż		
2003–2004	Heko Czermno		(23)
2004–2006	Korona Kielce	58	(38)
2006–2007	Torpedo Moscow	15	(2)
2007	Widzew Łódź	7	(0)
2008	Polonia Warsaw	10	(0)
2009	Kolejarz Stróże	5	(3)
2009	Ceramika Opoczno		
2010	Doxa Kranoulas	10	(6)
2010–2011	Ceramika Opoczno	29	(4)
2011–2012	Woy Bukowiec Opoczyński		
2012–2013	Lechia Tomaszów Mazowiecki	48	(11)
2015	Ceramika Opoczno		
2016	Ceramika Opoczno	1	(1)
2016–2017	LKS Radzice	0	(0)

International career
2005	Poland	1	(1)
- * Club domestic league appearances and goals

Grzegorz Piechna (born 18 September 1976) is a Polish former professional footballer who played as a forward. He scored 21 goals in 36 matches in Polish Ekstraklasa and was the top league goalscorer once.

== Career ==
Piechna's nickname is Kiełbasa (a sausage), because before he started his career he worked for a butchery.

Piechna played for Korona Kielce and Widzew Łódź in the Polish Ekstraklasa.

=== International goals ===
Scores and results list Poland's goal tally first, score column indicates score after each Piechna goal.

List of international goals scored by Grzegorz Piechna
No.	Date	Venue	Opponent	Score	Result	Competition
1	16 November 2005	Miejski Stadion Sportowy "KSZO", Ostrowiec Świętokrzyski, Poland	Estonia	3–1	3–1	Friendly

== Honours ==
Korona Kielce

- II liga: 2004–05

Individual

- Polish Newcomer of the Year: 2005
- Ekstraklasa Player of the Year: 2005
- Ekstraklasa top scorer: 2005–06
- II liga top scorer: 2004–05
- III liga, group IV top scorer: 2003–04
- IV liga Łódź top scorer: 2001–02, 2002–03
- Regional league top scorer: 1997–98
- Korona Kielce Best Player of All-time: 2013
