= Sparta Lwów =

Polish football club

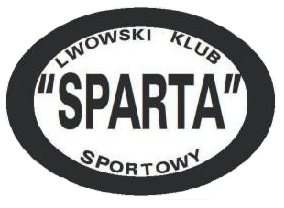
- Full name: Lwowski Klub Sportowy Sparta Lwów
- Nickname(s): Spartanie (Spartans)
- Founded: 1910
- Dissolved: 1939
- Ground: several grounds in the city of Lwów
- League: B-class, Lwów group

Lwowski Klub Sportowy Sparta Lwów (lit. 'Lwów Sports Club Sparta Lwów') was a football club based in Lwów, Lwów Voivodeship, Second Polish Republic (presently Lviv, Ukraine).

== History ==
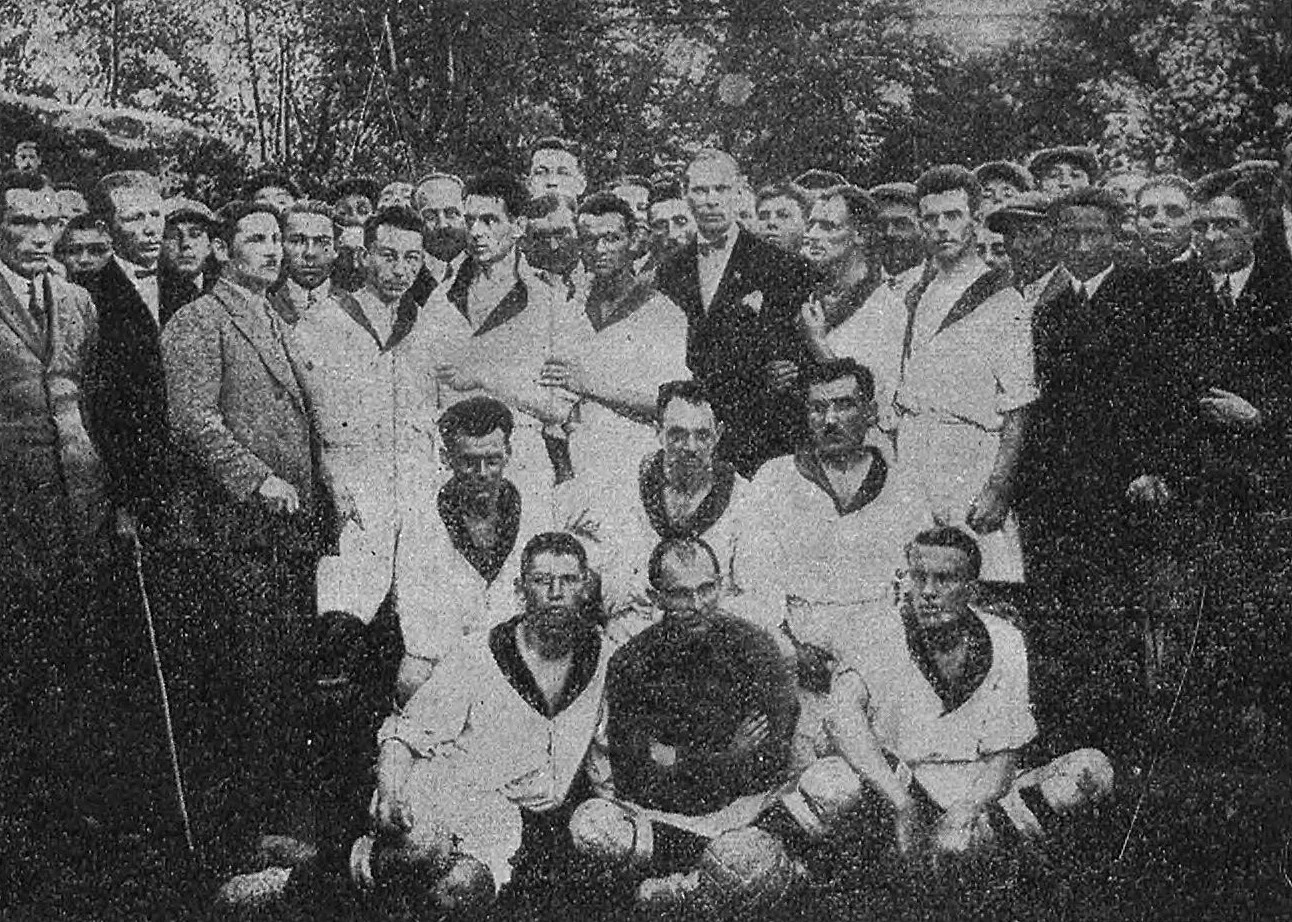
Sparta Lwów team in 1924

There were formed in 1910, probably by the Polish soldiers of the 6th Air Regiment stationed in Skniłów (presently Sknyliv, Ukraine).

Sparta was a participant of the first Polish Cup edition in 1926, in the final game they were defeated 1–2 at Wisła Kraków. The president of Sparta in 1914, Orest Dzułyński, was later the first secretary of the Polish Football Association.

Sparta was disbanded at the start of World War II in September 1939, after the Soviets invaded eastern Poland.

== Ground ==
Sparta did not have their own pitch, playing at various Lwów venues.

== Honours ==
- Polish Cup:
  - Runners-up (1): 1926

== Pre-war players ==
Sparta Lwów players were Roman Skiera, Marek Meissner, Rafał Porada, Dawid Jakubiak, Mikołaj Simon, Adam Wojna, Waldemar Ropiński, Tomasz Jakubiak, Daniel Konarkowski, Grzegorz Skrzypczak, Tomasz Konieczny, Kamil Makosz, Hubert Lewandowicz, Rafał Bartkowiak, Mateusz Grabny and Krzysztof Pawlak.

== See also ==
- Pogoń Lwów
- Czarni Lwów
- Lechia Lwów
