= Amica (company) =

Polish home appliance manufacturer

Amica S.A.
- Type: Joint-stock company
- Traded as: WSE: AMICA
- ISIN: PLAMICA00010
- Industry: Home appliance
- Founded: 1945; 81 years ago
- Headquarters: Wronki, Poland
- Area served: Europe
- Key people: Jacek Rutkowski (president)
- Revenue: 681,000,000 euro (2018)
- Net income: 26,600,000 euro (2018)
- Number of employees: 3,000 (2024)
- Website: www.amica.pl www.amica-group.com

Amica is a global manufacturer of household appliances headquartered in Wronki in western-central Poland. The company produces refrigerators, washing machines, dishwashers, vacuum cleaners, microwave ovens, electric stoves and kettles for kitchens under the brands Hansa, CDA, Gram.

== History ==
Amica was founded in 1945 under the names Predom-Wromet Heating Equipment Factory and Wromet Kitchen Products Factory.

In the 1980s, products were exported to the GDR. In 1992, the company was privatized and renamed Amica. In the same year, Amica football club of the same name was created. In 1997 it was listed on the Warsaw Stock Exchange.

In 2001, Amica acquired the Danish rival Gram Domestic and the following year the German Premiere Hausgerätetechnik GmbH.

The main sales markets for Amica are in Poland, Germany, Great Britain and Scandinavia.

In 2010, Samsung Electronics bought two Amica factories in the Polish cities Poznań and Wronki for the production of refrigerators and washing machines.

In 2012 and 2015, the company received international Red Dot Design Awards for its products in 2012 and 2015 as well as iF Product Design Award in 2015.

The Amica Group brand portfolio also includes foreign brands: Gram, Hansa and CDA. Gram is a Danish brand that has existed since 1901, acquired by Amica in 2001 and known in Scandinavia. Hansa is a brand that can be found in the markets of Eastern Europe. CDA is a UK brand acquired in 2015 and recognized in distribution channels such as kitchen furniture studios. In 2017, Amica bought a 60.71% stake in Sideme SA Societe Industrielle d'Equipement Moderne, one of the distributors of home appliances in France. After purchasing 39.29% of the shares in August 2015, Amica already owns 100% of Sideme. The total purchase price of all shares of the French company was 5.4 million Euros, which were financed from own funds.

In 2017, the company opened Poland's largest high-bay warehouse with height of 46 meters and an area of 6,500 square meters.

As of 2024, the company was present in 70 countries around the world and produced 4 million household appliances annually.

== See also ==
- List of companies of Poland
- Economy of Poland
