= 2005–06 Ekstraklasa =

80th season of top-tier football league in Poland

Ekstraklasa
- Season: 2005–06
- Champions: Legia Warsaw (8th title)
- Relegated: Lech Poznań; Polonia Warsaw
- Matches: 240
- Goals: 557 (2.32 per match)
- Top goalscorer: Grzegorz Piechna (21 goals)
- Average attendance: 5,522 ▲5.6%

The 2005–06 Ekstraklasa (also known as Orange Ekstraklasa due to its sponsorship by Orange Polska) started on 24 July 2005 and ended 13 May 2006. Legia Warsaw were crowned champions after ending Wisła Kraków's three season winning streak. This was Legia's first title since 2002.

== League table ==
| Pos | Team | Pld | W | D | L | GF | GA | GD | Pts | Qualification or relegation |
|---|---|---|---|---|---|---|---|---|---|---|
| 1 | Legia Warsaw (C) | 30 | 20 | 6 | 4 | 47 | 17 | +30 | 66 | Qualification to Champions League second qualifying round |
| 2 | Wisła Kraków | 30 | 19 | 7 | 4 | 50 | 20 | +30 | 64 | Qualification to UEFA Cup second qualifying round |
| 3 | Zagłębie Lubin | 30 | 14 | 7 | 9 | 45 | 32 | +13 | 49 | Qualification to UEFA Cup first qualifying round |
| 4 | Amica Wronki (Note: Amica Wronki and Lech Poznań merged after the end of the season leaving Lech in the top division while Amica joined the third division as a feeder club for Lech.) | 30 | 14 | 7 | 9 | 50 | 28 | +22 | 49 | Qualification to Intertoto Cup second round |
| 5 | Korona Kielce | 30 | 12 | 11 | 7 | 46 | 33 | +13 | 47 | |
| 6 | Odra Wodzisław | 30 | 10 | 10 | 10 | 23 | 27 | −4 | 40 | |
| 7 | Dyskobolia Grodzisk | 30 | 10 | 7 | 13 | 37 | 45 | −8 | 37 | |
| 8 | KS Cracovia | 30 | 10 | 7 | 13 | 32 | 44 | −12 | 37 | |
| 9 | GKS Bełchatów | 30 | 9 | 10 | 11 | 30 | 32 | −2 | 37 | |
| 10 | Pogoń Szczecin | 30 | 9 | 10 | 11 | 29 | 34 | −5 | 37 | |
| 11 | Wisła Płock | 30 | 10 | 4 | 16 | 30 | 45 | −15 | 34 | Qualification to UEFA Cup second qualifying round (Note: Wisła Płock took part in the UEFA Cup as they won the Puchar Polski 3-1 against Zagłębie Lubin) |
| 12 | Górnik Łęczna | 30 | 7 | 12 | 11 | 23 | 31 | −8 | 33 | |
| 13 | Górnik Zabrze | 30 | 8 | 5 | 17 | 29 | 46 | −17 | 29 | |
| 14 | Arka Gdynia (O) | 30 | 4 | 15 | 11 | 21 | 33 | −12 | 27 | Qualification to relegation playoffs |
| 15 | Polonia Warsaw (R) | 30 | 6 | 7 | 17 | 20 | 45 | −25 | 25 | Relegated to II liga |
| 16 | Lech Poznań (R) | 30 | 11 | 9 | 10 | 45 | 45 | 0 | 42 | Dissolved |

Source: 90minut.pl (in Polish)
(C) Champions; (O) Play-off winners; (R) Relegated

== Results ==
| Home \ Away | AMC | ARK | CRA | DSK | BEŁ | GKŁ | GÓR | KOR | LPO | LEG | ODR | POG | PWA | WIS | WPK | ZLU |
|---|---|---|---|---|---|---|---|---|---|---|---|---|---|---|---|---|
| Amica Wronki | | 1–1 | 1–1 | 2–0 | 2–1 | 6–0 | 3–1 | 0–3 | 1–4 | 0–2 | 4–0 | 4–1 | 3–0 | 0–1 | 2–0 | 3–1 |
| Arka Gdynia | 1–1 | | 1–1 | 0–0 | 2–0 | 1–1 | 3–0 | 0–2 | 0–2 | 0–0 | 1–1 | 0–0 | 0–1 | 1–0 | 1–1 | 0–1 |
| Cracovia | 1–0 | 2–1 | | 1–3 | 2–1 | 0–1 | 1–2 | 2–3 | 3–2 | 1–1 | 1–0 | 1–0 | 3–0 | 1–1 | 3–1 | 0–0 |
| Dyskobolia | 2–2 | 2–1 | 4–1 | | 3–1 | 1–1 | 0–1 | 0–3 | 3–1 | 0–4 | 0–0 | 1–3 | 1–2 | 2–4 | 3–0 | 1–0 |
| GKS Bełchatów | 1–2 | 1–1 | 2–0 | 2–2 | | 1–1 | 0–0 | 1–2 | 1–1 | 0–3 | 0–3 | 2–0 | 2–0 | 0–0 | 3–0 | 3–0 |
| Górnik Łęczna | 1–0 | 1–1 | 1–1 | 0–0 | 0–2 | | 1–0 | 3–0 | 0–0 | 0–0 | 0–0 | 0–1 | 0–1 | 1–1 | 2–1 | 1–3 |
| Górnik Zabrze | 0–2 | 2–0 | 3–0 | 0–0 | 0–1 | 2–0 | | 0–3 | 0–3 | 0–1 | 1–1 | 2–1 | 2–1 | 0–1 | 4–0 | 2–2 |
| Korona Kielce | 2–1 | 1–0 | 0–0 | 3–0 | 0–0 | 1–1 | 4–1 | | 1–1 | 2–2 | 0–1 | 0–1 | 3–2 | 1–0 | 2–3 | 1–1 |
| Lech Poznań | 1–1 | 1–1 | 1–0 | 4–1 | 1–1 | 1–0 | 3–2 | 0–0 | | 1–0 | 1–2 | 1–1 | 1–2 | 2–1 | 3–2 | 0–1 |
| Legia Warsaw | 1–0 | 2–0 | 5–0 | 0–2 | 1–0 | 0–2 | 3–2 | 1–0 | 3–1 | | 2–1 | 2–0 | 1–0 | 1–2 | 3–0 | 1–0 |
| Odra Wodzisław | 0–4 | 1–2 | 1–0 | 1–0 | 0–2 | 0–0 | 1–0 | 1–1 | 2–1 | 1–2 | | 1–0 | 0–0 | 1–1 | 1–0 | 0–0 |
| Pogoń Szczecin | 0–3 | 0–0 | 1–2 | 1–3 | 0–0 | 2–1 | 1–1 | 4–2 | 0–0 | 2–2 | 1–0 | | 2–0 | 1–2 | 2–0 | 1–0 |
| Polonia Warsaw | 0–0 | 0–0 | 1–3 | 1–2 | 0–0 | 0–3 | 4–1 | 1–1 | 2–1 | 0–2 | 0–3 | 1–1 | | 0–1 | 0–1 | 1–1 |
| Wisła Kraków | 0–0 | 3–1 | 3–0 | 2–1 | 3–0 | 1–0 | 2–0 | 2–2 | 5–1 | 0–0 | 1–0 | 2–1 | 2–0 | | 4–0 | 2–0 |
| Wisła Płock | 0–1 | 1–1 | 1–0 | 2–0 | 0–1 | 2–1 | 1–0 | 1–0 | 5–1 | 0–1 | 0–0 | 0–0 | 4–0 | 1–2 | | 3–2 |
| Zagłębie Lubin | 2–0 | 4–0 | 3–1 | 2–0 | 2–1 | 2–0 | 3–0 | 3–3 | 4–5 | 0–1 | 2–0 | 1–1 | 1–0 | 2–1 | 2–0 | |

Source: 90minut.pl (in Polish)
Legend: Blue = home team win; Yellow = draw; Red = away team win.

== Relegation playoffs ==
The matches were played on 14 and 18 June 2006.

| Team 1 | Agg. | Team 2 | 1st leg | 2nd leg |
|---|---|---|---|---|
| Jagiellonia Białystok | 1–4 | Arka Gdynia | 0–2 | 1–2 |

== Top goalscorers ==
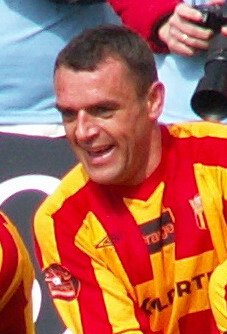
Grzegorz Piechna

| Rank | Player | Club | Goals |
|---|---|---|---|
| 1 | (Poland) Grzegorz Piechna | Korona Kielce | 21 |
| 2 | (Poland) Michał Chałbiński | Zagłębie Lubin | 15 |
| 3 | (Poland) Paweł Brożek | Wisła Kraków | 13 |
| 4 | (Poland) Krzysztof Gajtkowski | Lech Poznań / Korona Kielce | 12 |
| 5 | (Poland) Radosław Matusiak | GKS Bełchatów | 11 |
| 5 | (Poland) Piotr Reiss | Lech Poznań | 11 |
| 7 | (Brazil) Andradina | Pogoń Szczecin | 10 |
| 7 | (Poland) Maciej Iwański | Zagłębie Lubin | 10 |
| 7 | (Poland) Piotr Włodarczyk | Legia Warsaw | 10 |
| 10 | (Poland) Jacek Dembiński | Amica Wronki | 9 |

== Attendances ==
| No. | Club | Average | Highest |
|---|---|---|---|
| 1 | Wisła Kraków | 10,467 | 14,000 |
| 2 | Pogoń Szczecin | 9,233 | 15,000 |
| 3 | Legia Warszawa | 8,867 | 15,000 |
| 4 | Korona Kielce | 8,553 | 14,525 |
| 5 | Lech Poznań | 8,500 | 26,000 |
| 6 | Arka Gdynia | 8,167 | 13,000 |
| 7 | Górnik Zabrze | 5,735 | 19,500 |
| 8 | Górnik Łęczna | 4,633 | 7,500 |
| 9 | Cracovia | 4,033 | 5,000 |
| 10 | Bełchatów | 4,033 | 7,000 |
| 11 | Zagłębie Lubin | 3,513 | 7,000 |
| 12 | Wisła Płock | 2,740 | 6,000 |
| 13 | Odra Wodzisław Śląski | 2,707 | 4,000 |
| 14 | Dyskobolia | 2,473 | 6,000 |
| 15 | Polonia Warszawa | 2,467 | 4,000 |
| 16 | Amica Wronki | 2,227 | 6,000 |
