= 1999–2000 Polish Cup =

Puchar Polski

Tournament details
- Country: Poland
- Teams: 94

Final positions
- Champions: Amica Wronki
- Runners-up: Wisła Kraków

Tournament statistics
- Matches played: 97
- Goals scored: 414 (4.27 per match)
- Top goal scorer(s): Grzegorz Król; Arkadiusz Roman; Piotr Uss (6 goals each)

The 1999–2000 Polish Cup was the 46th season of the annual Polish cup competition. It began on 22 June 1999 with the preliminary round and ended on 9 June 2000 with second leg of the Final, played at Stadion Amica, Wronki. The winners qualified for the qualifying round of the UEFA Cup. Amica Wronki were the defending champions.

== Preliminary round ==
The matches took place on 22, 23, 27, 30 June, 21 July and 1 August 1999.

Team 1	Score	Team 2
22 June 1999
Kasztelan Sierpc	2–1	Okęcie Warsaw
23 June 1999
Narew Ostrołęka	1–6	Wigry Suwałki
Granica Kętrzyn	0–2	MKS Mława
27 June 1999
Pilica Bialobrzegi	1–2	Spartakus Razem Daleszyce
30 June 1999
Bałtyk Gdynia	1–0	Chemik Bydgoszcz
Inkopax Wrocław	3–2 (a.e.t.)	Górnik Polkowice
Odra II Wodzisław	0–4	Włókniarz Kietrz
SKP Słupca	0–1	LKS Jankowy
LKS Ceramika II Opoczno	1–2	Włókniarz Pabianice
Kolbuszowianka Kolbuszowa	2–3	Polonia Przemyśl
Włodawianka Włodawa	0–1	Czarni/Orlęta Dęblin
Pomerania Police	5–2 (a.e.t.)	Gwardia Koszalin
Raków Częstochowa	w/o^{1}	Wisłoka Dębica
KS Tymbark	w/o^{2}	Karpaty Krosno
BBTS Komorowice	3–0	Kabel II Kraków
21 July 1999
Jagiellonia Białystok	6–0	Olimpia Zambrów
1 August 1999
Tomasovia Tomaszów Lubelski	1–2	Tłoki Gorzyce

Notes

- Note 1: Wisłoka Dębica withdrew from the competition.
- Note 2: Karpaty Krosno withdrew from the competition.

== Round 1 ==
The matches took place on 1, 10 and 11 August 1999.

Team 1	Score	Team 2
1 August 1999
Nysa Zgorzelec	2–1 (a.e.t.)	Karkonosze Jelenia Góra
10 August 1999
Polonia Przemyśl	4–0	Hetman Zamość
Jagiellonia Białystok	0–1	Piotrcovia Piotrków Trybunalski
11 August 1999
Kasztelan Sierpc	0–3	Raków Częstochowa
MKS Mława	2–0	Górnik Łęczna
Wigry Suwałki	0–0 (a.e.t.) (4–3 p)	Jeziorak Iława
Spartakus Razem Daleszyce	0–3	Hutnik Kraków
Naprzód Rydułtowy	0–4	Włókniarz Kietrz
Włókniarz Pabianice	2–4	Korona Kielce
Lubuszanin Drezdenko	0–2	Pomerania Police
Pogoń Świebodzin	1–3	LKS Jankowy
Czarni/Orlęta Dęblin	w/o^{1}	Unia Tarnów
Inkopax Wrocław	3–2	Odra Opole
Pomorzanin Toruń	0–3	Bałtyk Gdynia
BBTS Komorowice	5–0	GKS Grunwald Ruda Śląska
KS Tymbark	0–3	Wawel Kraków
Raków II Częstochowa	0–2	LKS Ceramika Opoczno
Tłoki Gorzyce	4–0	Stal Sanok
Podlasie Biała Podlaska	3–2	Avia Świdnik
Syrena Młynary	1–5	Lechia/Polonia Gdańsk
Piast Kobylin	1–3	Lechia Zielona Góra
Amica II Wronki	1–3	Odra Szczecin
Warta Poznań	1–2	RKS Radomsko
Jutrzenka Warta	0–2	MKS Myszków
Pogoń Siedlce	0–2	Stal Stalowa Wola
Pogoń Lębork	2–2 (a.e.t.) (3–4 p)	Aluminium Konin
Unia Skierniewice	0–1	KSZO Ostrowiec Świętokrzyski
Górnik Wałbrzych	0–3	Polonia Bytom
Jagiellonka Nieszawa	4–0	Toruński KP

Notes

- Note 1: Unia Tarnów withdrew from the competition.

== Round 2 ==
The matches took place on 14 and 15 September 1999.

Team 1	Score	Team 2
14 September 1999
MKS Mława	1–2 (a.e.t.)	Lechia/Polonia Gdańsk
15 September 1999
Pomerania Police	0–0 (a.e.t.) (6–5 p)	Dyskobolia Grodzisk Wlkp.
Wigry Suwałki	0–0 (a.e.t.) (2–4 p)	Petrochemia Płock
Lechia Zielona Góra	3–4 (a.e.t.)	Odra Szczecin
Bałtyk Gdynia	2–3 (a.e.t.)	Aluminium Konin
LKS Jankowy	1–3 (a.e.t.)	RKS Radomsko
Jagiellonka Nieszawa	4–3 (a.e.t.)	KSZO Ostrowiec Świętokrzyski
Nysa Zgorzelec	2–6	Śląsk Wrocław
Inkopax Wrocław	6–0	Polonia Bytom
Piotrcovia Piotrków Trybunalski	0–1	Raków Częstochowa
Tłoki Gorzyce	1–0	LKS Ceramika Opoczno
Wawel Kraków	1–0	Włókniarz Kietrz
BBTS Komorowice	0–1	MKS Myszków
Polonia Przemyśl	0–1	Hutnik Kraków
Podlasie Biała Podlaska	0–2	Stal Stalowa Wola
Czarni/Orlęta Dęblin	0–2	Korona Kielce

== Round 3 ==
The matches took place on 12 and 13 October 1999.

Team 1	Score	Team 2
12 October 1999
Wawel Kraków	1–3	Górnik Zabrze
Inkopax Wrocław	0–2	Pomerania Police
OKS Stomil Olsztyn	1–1 (a.e.t.) (2–4 p)	Odra Wodzisław
13 October 1999
GKS Bełchatów	2–1	Zagłębie Lubin
Raków Częstochowa	0–2	Petrochemia Płock
RKS Radomsko	2–0	Korona Kielce
Śląsk Wrocław	0–1	Widzew Łódź
Jagiellonka Nieszawa	1–2 (a.e.t.)	Stal Stalowa Wola
Hutnik Kraków	2–2 (a.e.t.) (4–5 p)	Polonia Warsaw
Odra Szczecin	1–2	Lech Poznań
Aluminium Konin	1–2	Legia Warsaw
Tłoki Gorzyce	1–1 (a.e.t.) (2–4 p)	MKS Myszków
Lechia/Polonia Gdańsk	0–2	Wisła Kraków
GKS Katowice	0–2	ŁKS Łódź
Ruch Chorzów	2–0	Pogoń Szczecin
Amica Wronki	2–1 (a.e.t.)	Ruch Radzionków

== Round 4 ==
The matches took place on 8 March 2000.

Team 1	Score	Team 2
8 March 2000
MKS Myszków	1–3	Widzew Łódź
RKS Radomsko	1–1 (a.e.t.) (5–4 p)	Górnik Zabrze
Odra Wodzisław	0–2	Legia Warsaw
Petrochemia Płock	0–2	Polonia Warsaw
Pomerania Police	3–2 (a.e.t.)	Lech Poznań
Amica Wronki	2–1 (a.e.t.)	ŁKS Łódź
Ruch Chorzów	1–2 (a.e.t.)	GKS Bełchatów

== Quarter-finals ==
The first legs took place on 11 April, when the second legs took place on 18 and 19 April 2000.

Team 1	Agg.	Team 2	1st leg	2nd leg
Polonia Warsaw	2–0	Pomerania Police	1–0	1–0
GKS Bełchatów	1–2	Wisła Kraków	1–0	0–2
Legia Warsaw	5–5 (1–3 p)	Amica Wronki	3–2	2–3 (a.e.t.)
Widzew Łódź	3–3 (a)	RKS Radomsko	3–1	0–2

== Semi-finals ==
The first legs took place on 4 May, when the second legs took place on 11 May 2000.

Team 1	Agg.	Team 2	1st leg	2nd leg
Wisła Kraków	4–1	Polonia Warsaw	2–1	2–0
Amica Wronki	6–3	RKS Radomsko	5–3	1–0

== Final ==
=== First leg ===
6 June 2000
18:00 CEST (UTC+02:00)

Wisła Kraków	2–2	Amica Wronki
Frankowski 44', 77'	Report	Sobociński 28'; Sokołowski II 65'

Stadion Miejski, Kraków
Attendance: 8,000
Referee: Ryszard Wójcik (Opole)

=== Second leg ===
9 June 2000
18:00 CEST (UTC+02:00)

Amica Wronki	3–0	Wisła Kraków
Biliński 8'; Zieńczuk 45'; Sobociński 84'	Report

Stadion Amica, Wronki
Attendance: 5,500
Referee: Tomasz Mikulski (Lublin)

Amica Wronki won 5–2 on aggregate
