= Popowo, Szamotuły County =

Popowo
- Village
- Location within Poland
- Coordinates: 52°42′57″N 16°19′6″E
- Country: Poland
- Voivodeship: Greater Poland
- County: Szamotuły
- Gmina: Wronki
- Population: 259

Popowo ([pɔˈpɔvɔ]; German: 1943–45 Krummwiese) is a village in the administrative district of Gmina Wronki, within Szamotuły County, Greater Poland Voivodeship, in west-central Poland.
