= KP Chemik Police =

Polish football club

- Full name: Klub Piłkarski Chemik; Police
- Founded: 1 January 1968; 57 years ago
- Ground: Stadion OSiR
- Capacity: 2,795
- Chairman: Przemysław Korotkiewicz
- Manager: Jarosław Grzesło
- League: IV liga West Pomerania
- 2023–24: IV liga West Pomerania, 14th of 18
- Website: www.chemik.police.pl
Home colours	Away colours

Klub Piłkarski Chemik Police, commonly referred to as Chemik Police, is a football club based in Police near Szczecin, Poland.

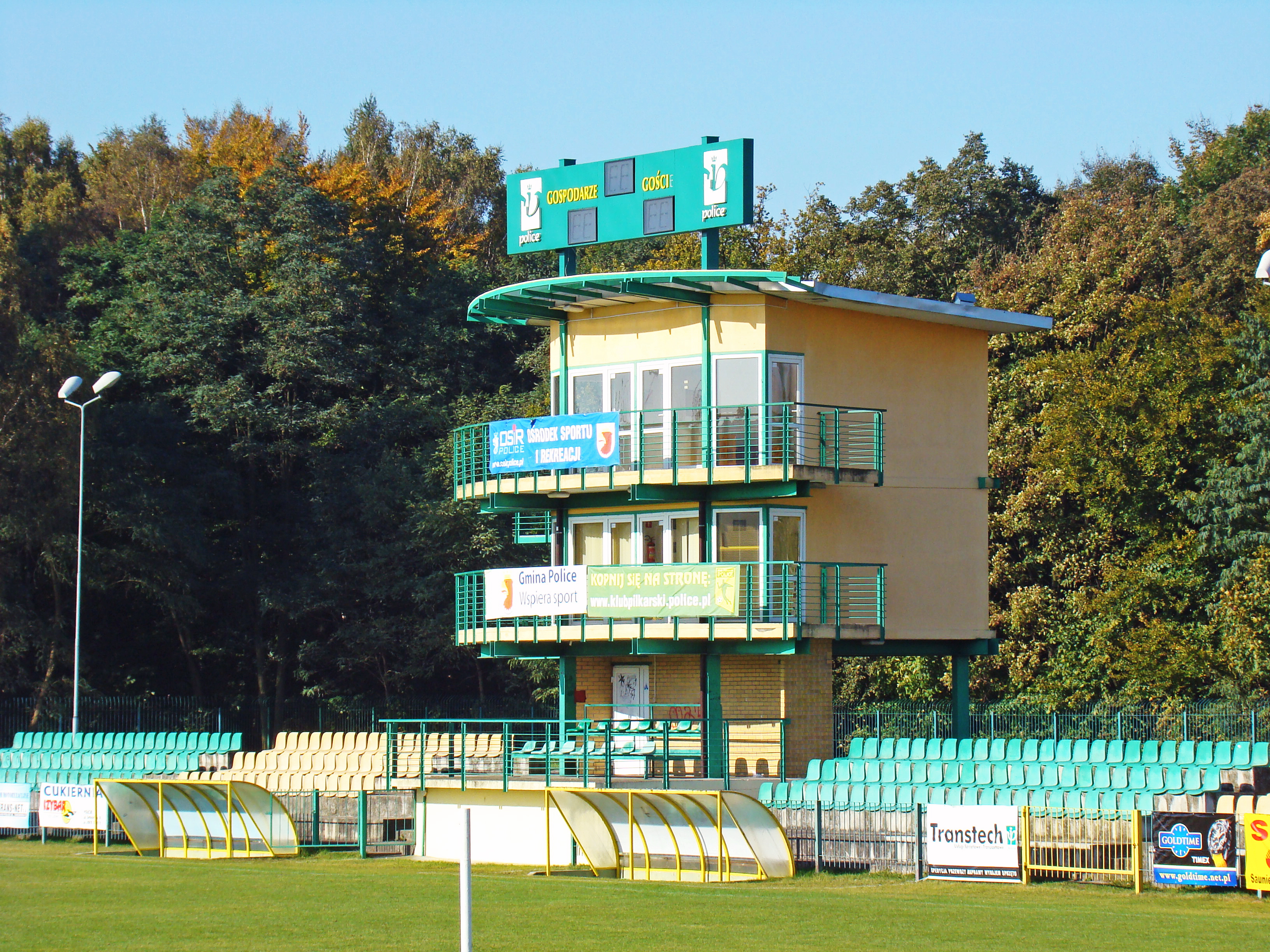
Ground: Stadion OSiR

== History of club names ==
- 1968–1991 - KS Chemik Police
- 1992–1993 - Polger Police
- 1993–1999 - MKS Chemik Police
- 1999–2001 - Pomerania Police
- 2001–2008 - KP Police
- 2008–present - KP Chemik Police
