= Jeziorak Iława =

Polish football club

- Full name: Iławski Klub Sportowy Jeziorak Iława
- Nickname: Jeziorowcy (The Lakers)
- Founded: 6 December 1945; 80 years ago
- Ground: Municipal Stadium
- Capacity: 4,500
- Chairman: Mariusz Wilk
- Manager: Jarosław Chodowiec
- League: IV liga Warmia-Masuria
- 2024-25: IV liga Warmia-Masuria, 14th of 16 (relegated)
- Website: https://www.jeziorakilawa.pl/
Home colours	Away colours

Jeziorak Iława is a Polish football club based in Iława, Poland. It was founded in 1945. The team's official colors are white and blue. Jeziorak played in the second division for five years and spent multiple seasons at the third level of Polish association football, and currently sits in the IV liga Warmia-Masuria.

== History ==
The club was established in 1945, the exact date being arbitrary. Initially, it was called Warmia. In May 1946, the football team played their first match against Drwęca Nowe Miasto Lubawskie. In 1947, the club's name was changed to Kolejarz. Ten years later, the current name, Jeziorak was adopted.

In 2014, a new association, initially called ITR and later renamed to ITS Jeziorak, which continues the traditions of the club established in 1945, was founded.

=== League history ===
In 1956, the football team was promoted to the third division for the first time and played at this level for three consecutive seasons. From the 1960s until the 1980s, the club oscillated between the third and fifth league level.

In 1988, the team was promoted to the third division. It marked the start of the most successful period in the club's history. From 1989 onwards, Jeziorak's results in the third division improved with each passing season. In 1995, the team finished second at the third level. However, FC Piaseczno, then a second division club, gave up its place at that level for financial reasons. The Warsaw Regional Football Association suggested that a playoff match between the fifteenth team of the second division, Radomiak Radom, and the runner-up at the third level, Jeziorak Iława, was held to decide which team gets the second-tier spot. Having been approved by the central authorities, the match was held on 30 July 1995 in Warsaw. Jeziorak won 5–1 and gained promotion to the II liga.

During the 1995–96 season, right after having been promoted, Jeziorak was the leader of II liga at the halfway stage. Ultimately, the club finished fourth out of 18 teams in the eastern group of the second division. This has been the best result in the club's entire history so far. The following season, Jeziorak was ranked eight, and one year later - seventh. In the 1998–99 season, the season when the number of teams participating in both second division groups was reduced from 18 to 16, (Note: With three teams withdrawing, the final number of participants was 14 in the western group and 15 in the eastern group.) Jeziorak finished ninth, avoiding relegation by just one point. In the 1999–00 season, the two groups of the second division were merged to create a single II liga that numbered 24 teams. Jeziorak only managed to finish 20th, (Note: That season, teams that finished 17th and below were relegated. The unusually large number of relegated teams was due to the fact that from the following season, the number of teams competing at the second level was further reduced to 20.) as a result of which, the club was relegated to the third division.

In the 2000–01 campaign, the club finished 17th out of 20 teams in the third division and was relegated once again. Mounting debt is given as one of the reasons for this failure. Jeziorak spent the following four seasons at the fourth level. While the club managed to win promotion back to the third level in 2005, the team finished 12th out of 15 teams and returned to the fourth division the following year where it stayed for the next two seasons.

After the 2007–08 season, the league system in Poland was reformed. Jeziorak, having won its group of the fourth division, participated in playoffs against Unia Tarnów winning in a penalty shootout and gaining promotion to the new II liga. (Note: The "new second division" (nowa II liga), as it was unofficially referred to, has been the third level of Polish association football since 2008/09.) Jeziorak played at the third level for the following four seasons. However, continuous financial problems resulted in the team being relegated and then, withdrawing from participating at the fourth level in 2012. Jeziorak spent the following two seasons (2012–13 and 2013–14) in the regional league, the sixth level of association football in Poland.

In 2014, the team started anew by joining the Klasa B, which is the eight division - the lowest level of association football in the region. While the team only managed to finish fourth in the 2014–15 season, from the following season onwards, Jeziorak has been steadily climbing the league ladder, winning their groups in the Klasa B in 2016, the Klasa A in 2017, and the regional league in 2018.

=== In the Polish Cup ===
The club's most notable result at the central level of the Polish Cup was achieved during the 1994–95 season. In the fall of 1994, before being promoted to the second division, Jeziorak won against Polonia Chodzież (third division at the time) in a penalty shootout in the first round, proceeding to win against Stomil Olsztyn (recently promoted to the top tier of Polish association football) in a penalty shootout in the second round. Both matches ended in 0–0 draws. In the third round, Jeziorak won against Elana Toruń (third division) 4–1 after extra time. In the fourth round, Jeziorak decisively won against the top-tier team, Górnik Zabrze, 3–1. Jeziorak proceeded to eliminate Amica Wronki (second division) 1–0 in the fifth round. The club reached the quarterfinals of the cup being eliminated by Lech Poznań, another top-tier club, the following spring.

Jeziorak managed to reach the 16th-finals or round of 32 on other occasions by eliminating lower-tier teams. This took place in 1997, 2000, 2006 and 2007.

== Honours ==
- Polish Cup
  - Quarter-finalists: 1994–95

== Current squad ==
As of 31 May 2018
Note: Flags indicate national team as defined under FIFA eligibility rules; some limited exceptions apply. Players may hold more than one non-FIFA nationality.

No.	Pos.	Nation	Player
1	GK	POL	Kamil Jędrzejewski
2	DF	POL	Tomasz Kaszlewicz
3	DF	POL	Grzegorz Ostanek
4	MF	POL	Paweł Burny
5	DF	POL	Dawid Kowalski
6	DF	POL	Michał Foj
7	DF	POL	Krzysztof Kressin
8	MF	POL	Łukasz Święty
9	FW	POL	Wojciech Figurski
11	MF	POL	Remigiusz Parulis
12	GK	POL	Dawid Mazurowski
13	FW	POL	Rafał Kuchnik
14	MF	POL	Daniel Madej
15	MF	POL	Aleksander Krajewski

No.	Pos.	Nation	Player
16	DF	POL	Karol Kaźmierski
17	MF	POL	Radosław Galas
18	MF	POL	Jarosław Rzeźnikiewicz
19	FW	POL	Łukasz Suchocki
20	DF	POL	Jakub Słomski
21	FW	POL	Oscar Kotłowski
22	MF	POL	Jakub Gula
23	GK	POL	Grzegorz Sobiech
-	GK	POL	Marek Lewicki
-	DF	POL	Kordian Wantowski
-	FW	POL	Mateusz Wojtczuk
-	MF	POL	Jakub Filbrandt
-	MF	POL	Dominik Smulski
-	MF	POL	Wiktor Zakrzewski
