= Amica Wronki =

Association football club

KS Amica Wronki
- Full name: Klub Sportowy Amica Wronki
- Nickname(s): Kuchenki (The stoves)
- Founded: 21 June 1992; 33 years ago
- Dissolved: 15 June 2007; 18 years ago
- Ground: Amica Wronki Stadium, Wronki
- Capacity: 5,296
| Home colours | Away colours |

Amica Wronki was a Polish football club based in Wronki, Poland.

The club was invariably linked to Amica, a manufacturer of white goods, predominantly stoves, which gave the club its nickname. The company's increasing profits gave the new team tremendous financial clout in the Polish leagues. The club was formed when two clubs were joined, Błękitni Wronki and LZS Czarni Wromet Wróblewo. The new club was named FK Amica Wronki and in just 4 years, the club won promotion from the Fourth Division to the Orange Ekstraklasa.

They have been in the top division in Poland since 1995. In May 2006, they merged with fellow Ekstraklasa team Lech Poznań. The reserve team then became its first team but only lasted one season before it was finally disbanded. In 2007, one of the clubs that was merged that created Amica, Błękitni Wronki was re-founded and is considered to be a phoenix club.

== History ==
=== Foundation and rise ===
The history of SSA Amica Sport goes back to 1992 when the "Amica company" (a white goods manufacturer) wanted to sponsor a football team in the town of Wronki where their factory was located. The Amica company's increasing profits gave the new team financial clout in the Polish leagues. The club was formed when two clubs were joined, Błękitni Wronki and LZS Czarni Wromet Wróblewo.

The first Amica Wronki logo used 1992–1999

In the 1993–1994 season Amica Wronki were promoted to the third division. The next season the team, led by Jarosław Szuby, won promotion to the second tier. Amica didn't stay in the second division for long, because the following season they again won promotion, this time to the Ekstraklasa under Marian Kurowski who took over the job started by former coaches Bogusław Baniak and Horst Panic.

=== Golden era of Ryszard Forbrich ===
The team finished 5th, 5th and 7th in successive seasons to cement themselves as an Ekstraklasa side.

On 13 June 1998, Amica Wronki beat Aluminium Konin 5–3 to win their first Polish Cup and first trophy in their history. Despite the team from Konin being by far the better team, Amica Wronki won in controversial circumstances, with the help of the referee Marek Kowalczyk so obvious that he was given a three-month ban, but the PZPN match observer Alojzy Jarguz inexplicably gave the referee a high note. Impartial observers, such the manager of Lech Poznań Adam Topolski, chairman of Olimpia Poznań (a top flight club at the time) Bolesław Krzyżostaniak, the chief of Zawisza Bydgoszcz Edward Potok and former Górnik Konin manager Janusz Białek were all highly critical of the match they have witnessed. The director of Amica Wronki at the time, Ryszard Forbrich, known as "Fryzjer", was later revealed to be the leader of an organised crime group, fixing matches all around the country, instrumental to a huge corruption scandal in Polish football. He later admitted to fixing the match in his autobiography. The 1998 cup final however was never investigated, with trophy still belonging to Amica, and remains a sore point for Górnik fans to this day.

On 18 July 1998, Amica Wronki won the Polish Super Cup, contested by the previous season's league and cup champions, by beating ŁKS Łódź after a goal by Radosław Biliński.

Amica qualified for the last edition of the now defunct European Cup Winners Cup in the 1998–99 season, playing for the first time against European opposition. They beat Hibernians FC 5–0 in the qualifying round before losing to SC Heerenveen 4–1 on aggregate in the first round. After a disappointing 1998–99 league campaign where they finished in 12th place, they managed to end the season well by winning their second Polish Cup by beating GKS Bełchatów on 13 June 1999. Once more they had the opportunity of playing in Europe through the UEFA Cup, and surprisingly beat Brøndby IF of Denmark 5–4 on aggregate in the first round. They followed up that success by beating league champions Wisła Kraków to win their second Polish Super Cup on 22 September 1999. They were drawn against Spanish team Atlético Madrid in the second round of the Uefa Cup and lost 5–1 on aggregate, before ending the 1999–2000 season in sixth place. Amica won their third Polish Cup on 9 June 2000 in a rematch of the Super Cup game against Wisła Kraków. They appeared in a European competition for the third season in a row and made it to the second round beating FC Vaduz 6–3, FC Alania Vladikavkaz 5–0 and finally losing to Hertha 2–4 and finished the 2000–01 season in 7th place.

In the 2001–02 season, a reshuffle of the Ekstraklasa occurred to lower the number of teams from 18 to 16. Two groups of nine teams were created for the fall season. The spring season consisted of a Championship group consisting of the top five teams in both fall season groups, and a relegation group consisting of the bottom four teams from both fall season groups. Amica finished in fifth place in their group during the fall season with 12 points to qualify for the Championship group and ended the spring season in third. Amica made it to the Polish Cup final for the fourth time but were beaten by Wisła Kraków 8–2 on aggregate. Qualification for the 2002–03 UEFA Cup was accomplished as Polish Cup runners-up because Wisła had won the league title and therefore qualification for the UEFA Champions League. Amica beat Servette FC on the away goals rule after a 4–4 aggregate tie in the first round, before extending their streak of never having qualified past the second round by losing to Málaga CF 4–2 on aggregate and finishing the season in sixth place.

The following campaign fared much better, as a good run of games propelled them to third place in the league and therefore UEFA Cup qualification, the only downside being their elimination from the Polish Cup in the quarter finals. A penalty shoot-out was needed for Amica to beat Hungarians Budapest Honvéd FC 5–4 after a 1–1 aggregate tie in the second qualifying round of the 2004–05 UEFA Cup. A 2–1 victory in the first round against Latvians FK Ventspils was followed by their first appearance in the revamped UEFA Cup group stage. They lost all 4 group games to finish bottom of Group F. They finished in sixth place in the league, thus failing to get into European competition the following season.

=== Merger and disbandment ===
The season was their last as Amica Wronki announced that they would merge with Lech Poznań to form a new team called KKS Lech Poznań for the 2006–2007 season. They played their last game in the Ekstraklasa on 13 May 2006 with a 2–1 win over GKS Bełchatów and finished in 4th place in the final league standings.

Amica would still function as a lower-league team for the 2006–07 season but the bulk of players and staff had either joined new clubs or transferred to Lech Poznań which represented the newly merged team in the Ekstraklasa. The roster consisted mostly of youth players; the oldest player in the new squad being 22 years old. This would have gave them an opportunity to showcase their talents before they are transferred either to Lech Poznań, who have the right of first refusal, or to other clubs.

Allegedly, one of the main reasons that the merger was finalised was the Amica company wanting to invest in a team with a larger fanbase. At the time, Wronki has a population of 12,000 while Poznań has over 578,900 inhabitants.. Another reason was that Lech Poznań were looking for a new sponsor to inject funds into the team and Amica fit the bill perfectly since they were so close. Both cities are in the Greater Poland voivodeship of Poland and are barely 50 kilometres (31 mi) apart.

The 2006–07 season didn't start well for the new-look Lech Poznań as they lost their chance to get into Europe, a benefit that Amica Wronki fought for last season by finishing fourth while Lech Poznań was placed sixth. They lost 4–1 on aggregate against Moldovan team FC Tiraspol in the UEFA Intertoto Cup and had to contend with a season without European football in Poznań.

The reserve team then became its first team but only lasted one season before it was finally disbanded. In 2007, one of the clubs that was merged that created Amica, Błękitni Wronki, was re-founded and is considered to be a phoenix club.

== Stadium ==
The Wronki Stadium is small and modern with undersoil heating. The ground holds just over 5,000 spectators – a third of the town's population – and has floodlighting. The stadium staged three games during the 2006 UEFA U-19 European Championships held in Poland. The stadium is currently used by the Lech Poznań's reserve team, whilst Błękitni Wronki Amica's phoenix club play in Popów, hoping to return to their spiritual home in Wronki in the future.

== Fans ==
Amica and Błękitni fans have the same core group of supporters, as they see themselves as a continuation of one another, and therefore the rivalries are the same regardless which club the fans went to see throughout history.

As the club is from Greater Poland, as many smaller clubs in the region, the fans originally sympathised with the regional powerhouse Lech Poznań; however, Amica's controversial absorption into (/merger with) Lech has caused bad blood.

Even before Amica's existence, the fans from Wronki had a fierce rivalry with Sparta Szamotuły, with whom they contest the Szamotuły County Derby, however since 30 May 1976 when Sparta beat Błękitni 10–0 away from home the teams met only sporadically, since Amica went on to play in the Ekstraklasa. Since Amica's disbandment and Błękitni's re-founding the rivalry has been renewed in the lower leagues.

The club also developed a strong rivalry with Dyskobolia Grodzisk Wielkopolski during the Amica years, but since Dyskobolia's similar fate to that of Amica (taken over by Polonia Warsaw) both Błękitni and Dyskobolia have renewed their rivalry in the lower leagues.

In its heyday, when Amica played in continental competitions, their fans had good relations with Servette Geneva and a close friendship with fans of NEC Nijmegen after meeting them in a UEFA Cup game.

== Honours ==
- Polish Cup
  - Winners: 1997–98, 1998–99, 1999–2000
  - Finalists: 2001–02
- Polish Super Cup
  - Winners: 1998, 1999
  - Finalists: 2000
- Polish Under-19 Championship
  - Champions: 2002, 2007
  - Runners-up: 2003
- Polish Under-17 Championship
  - Champions: 1998, 2003
- Runners-up: 2002

=== Participation in European competitions ===
- UEFA Cup Winners' Cup 1998-99 – First round
- UEFA Cup 1999-00 – Second round
- UEFA Cup 2000-01 – Second round
- UEFA Cup 2002-03 – Second round
- UEFA Cup 2004-05 – Group stage

== Notable players ==
Over 100 league appearances

- Remigiusz Sobociński

International players

- Marek Bajor
- Mateusz Bartczak
- Arkadiusz Bąk
- Jarosław Bieniuk
- Bartosz Bosacki
- Marcin Burkhardt
- Tomasz Dawidowski
- Jacek Dembiński
- Dariusz Dudka
- Dariusz Gęsior
- Paweł Kryszałowicz
- Mariusz Kukiełka
- Ilijan Micanski
- Grzegorz Mielcarski
- Rafał Murawski
- Jerzy Podbrożny
- Piotr Reiss
- Paweł Skrzypek
- Māris Smirnovs, a Latvia national team member
- Grzegorz Szamotulski
- Marcin Wasilewski
- Grzegorz Wojtkowiak
- Marek Zieńczuk
- Jacek Ziober

== European record ==
| Season | Competition | Round | Opposition | Aggregate | Home | Away |
|---|---|---|---|---|---|---|
| 1998–1999 | UEFA Cup Winners' Cup | Qualifying | (Malta) Hibernians Paola | 5–0 | 4–0 | 1–0 |
| 1998–1999 | UEFA Cup Winners' Cup | Round 1 | (Netherlands) SC Heerenveen | 1–4 | 0–1 | 1–3 |
| 1999–2000 | UEFA Cup | Round 1 | (Denmark) Brøndby IF | 5–4 | 2–0 | 3–4 |
| 1999–2000 | UEFA Cup | Round 2 | (Spain) Atlético Madrid | 1–5 | 1–4 | 0–1 |
| 2000–2001 | UEFA Cup | Qualifying | (Liechtenstein) FC Vaduz | 6–3 | 3–0 | 3–3 |
| 2000–2001 | UEFA Cup | Round 1 | (Russia) Alania Vladikavkaz | 5–0 | 2–0 | 3–0 |
| 2000–2001 | UEFA Cup | Round 2 | (Germany) Hertha Berlin | 2–4 | 1–1 | 1–3 |
| 2002–2003 | UEFA Cup | Qualifying | (Wales) TNS | 12–2 | 5–0 | 7–2 |
| 2002–2003 | UEFA Cup | Round 1 | (Switzerland) Servette Geneva | 4–4 | 1–2 | 3–2 |
| 2002–2003 | UEFA Cup | Round 2 | (Spain) Málaga CF | 2–4 | 1–2 | 1–2 |
| 2004–2005 | UEFA Cup | 2nd qualifying round | (Hungary) Honvéd Budapest | 1–1 | 1–0 | 0–1 (5–4 home win after penalties) |
| 2004–2005 | UEFA Cup | Round 1 | (Latvia) FK Ventspils | 2–1 | 1–0 | 1–1 |
| 2004–2005 | UEFA Cup | Group Stage | (Scotland) Rangers F.C. | N/A | 0–5 | – |
| 2004–2005 | UEFA Cup | Group Stage | (Austria) Grazer AK | N/A | – | 1–3 |
| 2004–2005 | UEFA Cup | Group Stage | (Netherlands) AZ Alkmaar | N/A | 1–3 | – |
| 2004–2005 | UEFA Cup | Group Stage | (France) AJ Auxerre | N/A | – | 1–5 |

== See also ==
- Błękitni Wronki
