= 1998–99 Polish Cup =

Puchar Polski
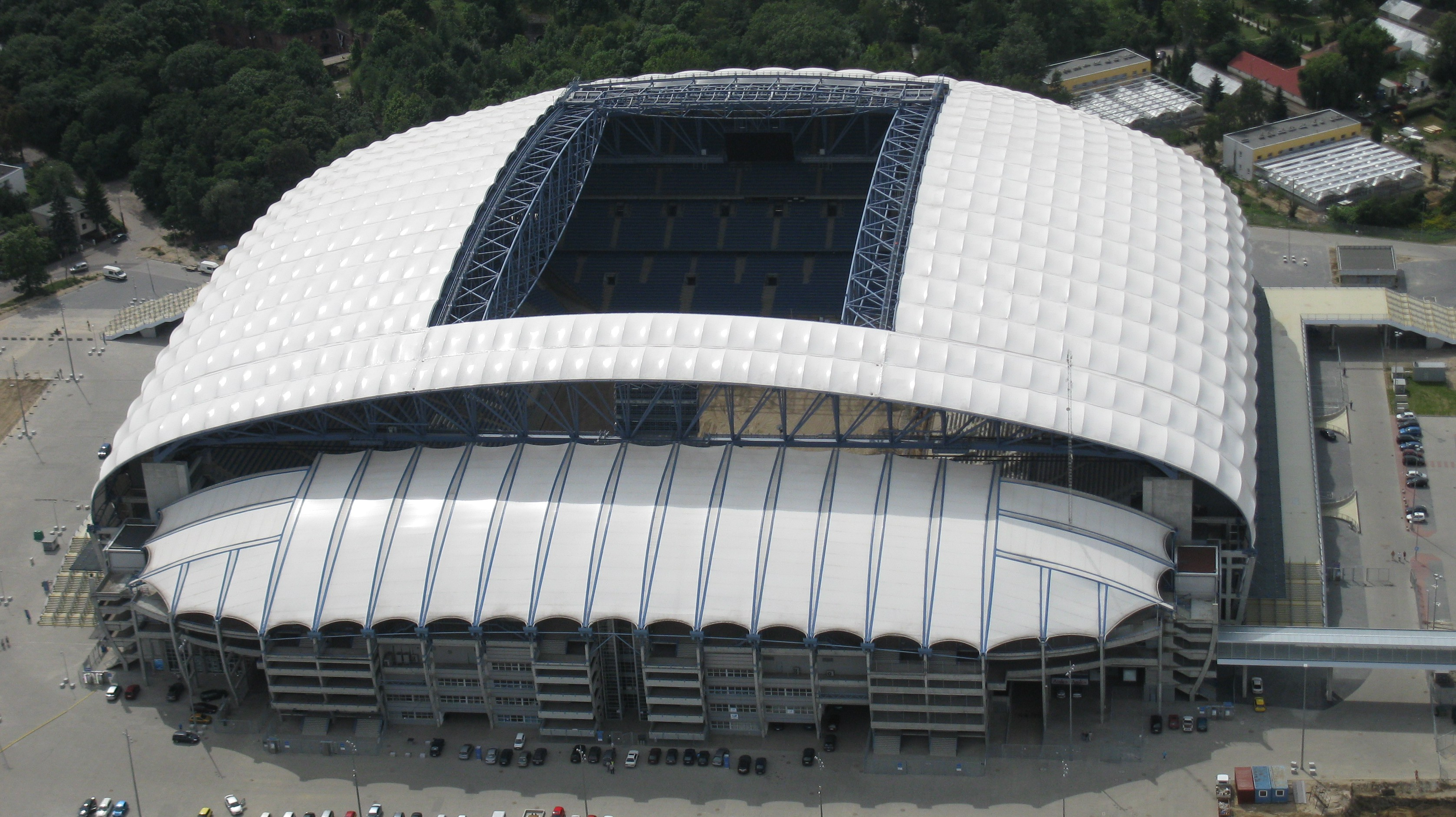

Tournament details
- Country: Poland
- Teams: 102

Final positions
- Champions: Amica Wronki
- Runners-up: GKS Bełchatów

Tournament statistics
- Matches played: 104
- Top goal scorer: Sławomir Król (8 goals)

The 1998–99 Polish Cup was the 45th season of the annual Polish cup competition. It began on 24 July 1998 with the preliminary round and ended on 13 June 1999 with the Final, played at Stadion Miejski, Poznań. The winners qualified for the first round of the UEFA Cup. Amica Wronki were the defending champions.

== Preliminary round ==
The matches took place on 24 July 1998.

Team 1	Score	Team 2
Obra Kościan	1–2	Pogoń Świebodzin
Jagiellonka Nieszawa	3–1	MKS Kutno
Unia Skierniewice	3–5	Piast Błaszki
Patria Buk	4–2 (a.e.t.)	Czarni Witnica
Pogoń Siedlce	1–2	AZS Podlasie Biała Podlaska
Kamax Kańczuga	7–1	Izolator Boguchwała
Pomezania Malbork	2–1	Pogoń Lębork
Kembud II Jelenia Góra	1–1 (a.e.t.) (3–4 p)	Nysa Kłodzko
Sparta Brodnica	1–1 (a.e.t.) (3–4 p)	Orzeł Biały Wałcz

== Round 1 ==
The matches took place between 26 and 30 July 1998.

Team 1	Score	Team 2
Żbik Nasielsk	3–0	Legia II Warsaw
Energetyk Gryfino	2–1	Gryf Polanów
Gryf Wejherowo	3–1	Pomezania Malbork
Orzeł Biały Wałcz	1–3	Goplania Inowrocław
Mragovia Mrągowo	5–4 (a.e.t.)	Mazur Ełk
Patria Buk	1–3 (a.e.t.)	Pogoń Świebodzin
Jagiellonka Nieszawa	7–0	Górnik Kłodawa
Ostrovia Ostrów Mazowiecka	1–4 (a.e.t.)	Olimpia Zambrów
Polonia Kępno	0–1	Piast Błaszki
Jagiellonia Białystok	w/o^{1}	AZS Podlasie Biała Podlaska
Odra II Opole	2–1	Polonia Środa Śląska
Start Łódź	1–2	Piotrcovia Piotrków Trybunalski
Raków II Częstochowa	0–1	Grunwald Ruda Śląska
MZKS Alwernia	2–0	KS Unia Oświęcim
Lewart Lubartów	3–1	Szydłowianka Szydłowiec
Granica Dorohusk	0–2	Tomasovia Tomaszów Lubelski
GKS Rudki	0–3	Stal II Stalowa Wola
Sanovia Lesko	2–3	Kamax Kańczuga
Glinik Gorlice	2–2 (a.e.t.) (3–5 p)	Wisłoka Dębica
Nysa Kłodzko	1–2 (a.e.t.)	Chrobry Głogów

Notes

- Note 1: The match between Jagiellonia Białystok and Biała Podlaska (0:1) was awarded in favor of Jagiellonia.

== Round 2 ==
The matches took place on 11, 12 and 19 August 1998.

Team 1	Score	Team 2
Energetyk Gryfino	0–2 (a.e.t.)	Aluminium Konin
Chemik Police	1–1 (a.e.t.) (4–2 p)	Lechia Zielona Góra
Goplania Inowrocław	2–4	Lechia/Polonia Gdańsk
Gryf Wejherowo	3–1	Zawisza Bydgoszcz
WKP Włocławek	w/o^{1}	MKS Myszków
Warmia Olsztyn	1–0	Elana Toruń
Mragovia Mrągowo	0–7	GKS Bełchatów
Olimpia Zambrów	0–1	Jeziorak Iława
Jagiellonka Nieszawa	2–1	LKS Ceramika Opoczno
Odra Opole	0–3	Górnik Wałbrzych
Chrobry Głogów	0–5	Varta Namyslow
Pogoń Świebodzin	2–2 (a.e.t.) (1–3 p)	Miedź Legnica
Żbik Nasielsk	0–5	RKS Radomsko
Warta Poznań	1–5	Śląsk Wrocław
Piotrcovia Piotrków Trybunalski	2–0	Polonia/Szombierki Bytom
Piast Błaszki	1–3	Naprzód Rydułtowy
Lewart Lubartów	0–3	Stal Stalowa Wola
Jagiellonia Białystok	0–2	Avia Świdnik
Tomasovia Tomaszów Lubelski	0–2	Korona Kielce
Świt Nowy Dwór Mazowiecki	3–0	Górnik Łęczna
Czuwaj Przemyśl	0–11	Hetman Zamość
Wisłoka Dębica	1–2 (a.e.t.)	Wawel Kraków
MZKS Alwernia	w/o^{2}	Okocimski KS Brzesko
Kamax Kańczuga	3–2	Unia Tarnów
Grunwald Ruda Śląska	2–1	Hutnik Kraków
Odra II Opole	0–4	Ruch Radzionków
Karkonosze Jelenia Góra	w/o^{3}	Sokół Tychy
Stal II Stalowa Wola	0–3	Cracovia

Notes

- Note 1: WKP Włocławek withdrew from the competition.
- Note 2: Okocimski KS Brzesko withdrew from the competition.
- Note 3: Sokół Tychy withdrew from the competition.

== Round 3 ==
The matches took place on 23, 29 and 30 September 1998.

Team 1	Score	Team 2
23 September 1998
Gryf Wejherowo	0–0 (a.e.t.) (3–4 p)	Lechia/Polonia Gdańsk
MZKS Alwernia	2–4	Wawel Kraków
Jagiellonka Nieszawa	1–1 (a.e.t.) (4–5 p)	Aluminium Konin
Świt Nowy Dwór Mazowiecki	1–0	Jeziorak Iława
Kamax Kańczuga	0–2	Hetman Zamość
Miedź Legnica	1–2	Karkonosze Jelenia Góra
Cracovia	1–0	MKS Myszków
RKS Radomsko	3–2	Piotrcovia Piotrków Trybunalski
Varta Namyslow	3–1	Górnik Wałbrzych
Stal Stalowa Wola	w/o^{1}	Naprzód Rydułtowy
Chemik Police	1–0	Śląsk Wrocław
Korona Kielce	2–2 (a.e.t.) (4–2 p)	Avia Świdnik
29 September 1998
Grunwald Ruda Śląska	3–1	Ruch Radzionków
30 September 1998
Warmia Olsztyn	1–3	GKS Bełchatów

Notes

- Note 1: Stal Stalowa Wola withdrew from the competition.

== Round 4 ==
The matches took place on 10, 13 and 14 October 1998.

Team 1	Score	Team 2
10 October 1998
Wawel Kraków	1–0	Grunwald Ruda Śląska
RKS Radomsko	1–0	Górnik Zabrze
13 October 1998
Karkonosze Jelenia Góra	1–3	Wisła Kraków
14 October 1998
Aluminium Konin	6–0	Pogoń Szczecin
Świt Nowy Dwór Mazowiecki	1–3	Legia Warsaw
Lechia/Polonia Gdańsk	2–3	OKS Stomil Olsztyn
Chemik Police	0–2	Amica Wronki
Varta Namyslow	1–1 (a.e.t.) (2–4 p)	Odra Wodzisław
Cracovia	2–3	GKS Katowice
Naprzód Rydułtowy	1–1 (a.e.t.) (3–4 p)	Ruch Chorzów
Hetman Zamość	0–4	GKS Bełchatów
Korona Kielce	2–0	Polonia Warsaw
KSZO Ostrowiec Świętokrzyski	0–1	ŁKS Łódź
Raków Częstochowa	0–0 (a.e.t.) (2–4 p)	Widzew Łódź
Dyskobolia Grodzisk Wlkp.	2–2 (a.e.t.) (4–3 p)	Zagłębie Lubin
Petrochemia Płock	2–1 (a.e.t.)	Lech Poznań

== Round 5 ==
The matches took place on 7 November 1998.

Team 1	Score	Team 2
7 November 1998
RKS Radomsko	3–1	Wisła Kraków
Aluminium Konin	1–0	Odra Wodzisław
Korona Kielce	1–0	GKS Katowice
Wawel Kraków	0–3	Ruch Chorzów
Dyskobolia Grodzisk Wlkp.	0–4	Widzew Łódź
Petrochemia Płock	0–1	OKS Stomil Olsztyn
GKS Bełchatów	0–0 (a.e.t.) (3–2 p)	Legia Warsaw
Amica Wronki	2–1	ŁKS Łódź

== Quarter-finals ==
The first legs took place on 10 March, when the second legs took place on 14 April 1999.

Team 1	Agg.	Team 2	1st leg	2nd leg
Korona Kielce	2–2 (a)	GKS Bełchatów	2–1	0–1
Ruch Chorzów	4–1	RKS Radomsko	2–1	2–0
Widzew Łódź	3–1	Aluminium Konin	3–0	0–1
Amica Wronki	4–1	OKS Stomil Olsztyn	3–0	1–1

== Semi-finals ==
The first legs took place on 4 and 5 May, when the second legs took place on 19 May 1999.

Team 1	Agg.	Team 2	1st leg	2nd leg
GKS Bełchatów	1–0	Ruch Chorzów	0–0	1–0
Amica Wronki	2–2 (8–7 p)	Widzew Łódź	1–1	1–1 (a.e.t.)

== Final ==
13 June 1999
16:00 CEST (UTC+02:00)

Amica Wronki	1–0	GKS Bełchatów
Siara 46'	Report

Stadion Miejski, Poznań
Attendance: 3,000
Referee: Jacek Granat (Warsaw)
