= Polish Cup =

- Organiser(s): Polish Football Association (PZPN)
- Founded: 1925; 101 years ago
- Region: Poland
- Teams: 70
- Qualifier for: UEFA Europa League
- Domestic cup: Polish Super Cup
- Current champions: Górnik Zabrze (7th title)
- Most championships: Legia Warsaw (21 titles)
- Broadcaster: TVP Sport
- Website: Official website
- 2026–27 Polish Cup

The Polish Cup in football (Polish: Puchar Polski w piłce nożnej [ˌpuxar ˈpɔlskʲi]), known as the STS Polish Cup (Polish: STS Puchar Polski) for sponsorship reasons, is an annual knockout football competition for Polish football clubs, held continuously since 1950, and is the second most important national title in Polish football after the Ekstraklasa title. Due to mass participation of teams, the tournament is often called The Cup of the Thousand Teams (Polish: Puchar Tysiąca Drużyn [ˌpuxar tɨˌɕɔnt͡sa ˈdruʐɨn]).

Participation is open to any club registered with the Polish FA, regardless of whether it competes in any league in the national pyramid or not. Reserve and veteran teams are also eligible, with reserve teams reaching the final on two occasions (and winning it once). The Cup is popular among lower-level teams, as it gives them a chance to play better known sides. In some cases, the underdogs have even reached the final, with the most famous example being Czarni Żagań, who were playing in the third division, when they reached the 1964–65 final, eventually won by Górnik Zabrze.

Lower league clubs have to enter regional qualification rounds and the winners of these join the teams from the first and second division in the competition proper. The regional qualifications are played in the preceding season, so that one edition of Polish Cup for lower ranked clubs can last two seasons. Each tie is decided by a single game which is held at the lower league side's stadium. The final used to be a single match, but 2002–2006 it was contested over two legs. Since 2007, the Cup has returned to the single-game final.

The first edition of the Polish Cup took place in 1926, but it was quickly abandoned. In the late 1930s, the President of Poland's Football Cup was organized, which featured teams of the Polish Football Association's regional districts.

The reigning champions are Górnik Zabrze, who defeated Raków Częstochowa 2–0 in the final of the 2025–26 edition. Raków Częstochowa hold the record for most consecutive tournament game wins (16) between 2020 and 2023, winning the cup in 2021 and 2022.

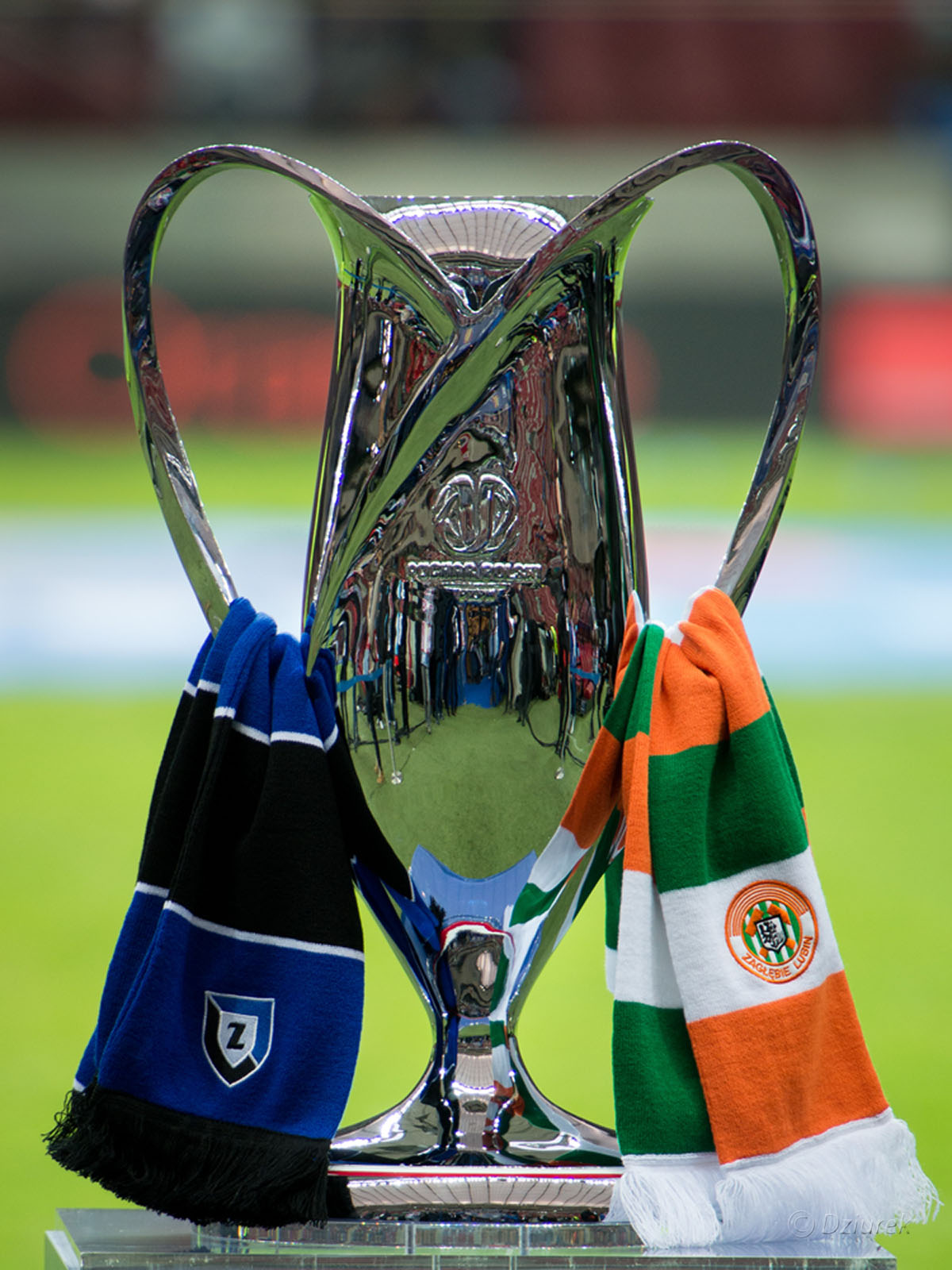
The current design of the Polish Cup

== Polish Cup winners ==
Previous cup winners are:

- 1925–26: Wisła Kraków^{II}
- 1927–50: not played
- 1950–51: Unia Chorzów
- 1951–52: Kolejarz Warsaw
- 1952–53: not played
- 1953–54: Gwardia Warsaw
- 1954–55: CWKS Warsaw
- 1955–56: CWKS Warsaw (2)
- 1956–57: ŁKS Łódź
- 1958–61: not played
- 1961–62: Zagłębie Sosnowiec
- 1962–63: Zagłębie Sosnowiec (2)
- 1963–64: Legia Warsaw (3)
- 1964–65: Górnik Zabrze
- 1965–66: Legia Warsaw (4)
- 1966–67: Wisła Kraków (2)
- 1967–68: Górnik Zabrze (2)
- 1968–69: Górnik Zabrze (3)
- 1969–70: Górnik Zabrze (4)
- 1970–71: Górnik Zabrze (5)
- 1971–72: Górnik Zabrze (6)
- 1972–73: Legia Warsaw (5)
- 1973–74: Ruch Chorzów (2)
- 1974–75: Stal Rzeszów^{II}
- 1975–76: Śląsk Wrocław
- 1976–77: Zagłębie Sosnowiec (3)
- 1977–78: Zagłębie Sosnowiec (4)
- 1978–79: Arka Gdynia
- 1979–80: Legia Warsaw (6)
- 1980–81: Legia Warsaw (7)
- 1981–82: Lech Poznań
- 1982–83: Lechia Gdańsk^{III}
- 1983–84: Lech Poznań (2)
- 1984–85: Widzew Łódź
- 1985–86: GKS Katowice
- 1986–87: Śląsk Wrocław (2)
- 1987–88: Lech Poznań (3)
- 1988–89: Legia Warsaw (8)
- 1989–90: Legia Warsaw (9)
- 1990–91: GKS Katowice (2)
- 1991–92: Miedź Legnica^{II}
- 1992–93: GKS Katowice (3)
- 1993–94: Legia Warsaw (10)
- 1994–95: Legia Warsaw (11)
- 1995–96: Ruch Chorzów^{II} (3)
- 1996–97: Legia Warsaw (12)
- 1997–98: Amica Wronki
- 1998–99: Amica Wronki (2)
- 1999–2000: Amica Wronki (3)
- 2000–01: Polonia Warsaw (2)
- 2001–02: Wisła Kraków (3)
- 2002–03: Wisła Kraków (4)
- 2003–04: Lech Poznań (4)
- 2004–05: not awarded
- 2005–06: Wisła Płock
- 2006–07: Dyskobolia Grodzisk Wielkopolski
- 2007–08: Legia Warsaw (13)
- 2008–09: Lech Poznań (5)
- 2009–10: Jagiellonia Białystok
- 2010–11: Legia Warsaw (14)
- 2011–12: Legia Warsaw (15)
- 2012–13: Legia Warsaw (16)
- 2013–14: Zawisza Bydgoszcz
- 2014–15: Legia Warsaw (17)
- 2015–16: Legia Warsaw (18)
- 2016–17: Arka Gdynia (2)
- 2017–18: Legia Warsaw (19)
- 2018–19: Lechia Gdańsk (2)
- 2019–20: Cracovia
- 2020–21: Raków Częstochowa
- 2021–22: Raków Częstochowa (2)
- 2022–23: Legia Warsaw (20)
- 2023–24: Wisła Kraków^{II} (5)
- 2024–25: Legia Warsaw (21)
- 2025–26: Górnik Zabrze (7)

^{II} Team played in the second level of the Polish league football
^{III} Team played in the third level of the Polish league football

Location of Polish Cup winners	Location of Polish cup winners in the Katowice urban area Location of Polish Cup winners in Warsaw Location of Polish Cup winners in Kraków

== Finals ==
Year	Winners	Score	Runners-up	Venue	Attendance
1926	Wisła Kraków	2–1	Sparta Lwów	Stadion Wisły, Kraków	1,500
1927–50	Not played.				
1951	Unia Chorzów	2–0	Gwardia Kraków	Stadion Wojska Polskiego, Warsaw	35,000
1952	Kolejarz Warsaw	1–0	CWKS Ib Warsaw	Stadion Wojska Polskiego, Warsaw	16,500
1953	Not played.				
1954	Gwardia Warsaw	0–0 (a.e.t.)	Gwardia Kraków	Stadion Wojska Polskiego, Warsaw	30,000
1954	Gwardia Warsaw	3–1 (R)	Gwardia Kraków	Stadion Olimpijski, Wrocław	30,000
1955	CWKS Warsaw	5–0	Budowlani Gdańsk	Stadion Wojska Polskiego, Warsaw	12,000
1956	CWKS Warsaw (2)	3–0	Górnik Zabrze	Stadion Dziesięciolecia, Warsaw	15,000
1957	ŁKS Łódź	2–1	Górnik Zabrze	Stadion ŁKS-u, Łódź	20,000
1958–61	Not played.				
1962	Zagłębie Sosnowiec	2–1	Górnik Zabrze	Stadion Śląski, Chorzów	25,000
1963	Zagłębie Sosnowiec (2)	2–0	Ruch Chorzów	Stadion Śląski, Chorzów	70,000
1964	Legia Warsaw (3)	2–1 (a.e.t.)	Polonia Bytom	Stadion Dziesięciolecia, Warsaw	25,500
1965	Górnik Zabrze	4–0	Czarni Żagań	Stadion Miejski, Zielona Góra	20,000
1966	Legia Warsaw (4)	2–1 (a.e.t.)	Górnik Zabrze	Stadion im. 22 lipca, Poznań	20,000
1967	Wisła Kraków (2)	2–0 (a.e.t.)	Raków Częstochowa	Stadion Błękitnych, Kielce	6,000
1968	Górnik Zabrze (2)	3–0	Ruch Chorzów	Stadion Śląski, Chorzów	6,000
1969	Górnik Zabrze (3)	2–0	Legia Warsaw	Stadion ŁKS-u, Łódź	40,000
1970	Górnik Zabrze (4)	3–1	Ruch Chorzów	Stadion Śląski, Chorzów	50,000
1971	Górnik Zabrze (5)	3–1	Zagłębie Sosnowiec	Stadion Śląski, Chorzów	3,000
1972	Górnik Zabrze (6)	5–2	Legia Warsaw	Stadion ŁKS-u, Łódź	31,000
1973	Legia Warsaw (5)	0–0 (a.e.t.) (4–2 p)	Polonia Bytom	Stadion im. 22 lipca, Poznań	11,000
1974	Ruch Chorzów (2)	2–0	Gwardia Warsaw	Stadion Wojska Polskiego, Warsaw	8,000
1975	Stal Rzeszów	0–0 (a.e.t.) (3–2 p)	ROW II Rybnik	Stadion Cracovii, Kraków	15,000
1976	Śląsk Wrocław	2–0	Stal Mielec	Stadion Wojska Polskiego, Warsaw	15,000
1977	Zagłębie Sosnowiec (3)	1–0	Polonia Bytom	Stadion Śląski, Chorzów	30,000
1978	Zagłębie Sosnowiec (4)	2–0	Piast Gliwice	Stadion Śląski, Chorzów	5,000
1979	Arka Gdynia	2–1	Wisła Kraków	Stadion Miejski, Lublin	15,000
1980	Legia Warsaw (6)	5–0	Lech Poznań	Stadion Miejski, Częstochowa	26,000
1981	Legia Warsaw (7)	1–0 (a.e.t.)	Pogoń Szczecin	Stadion Miejski, Kalisz	12,500
1982	Lech Poznań	1–0	Pogoń Szczecin	Stadion Oporowska, Wrocław	15,000
1983	Lechia Gdańsk	2–1	Piast Gliwice	Stadion XXXV-lecia PRL, Piotrków Trybunalski	16,000
1984	Lech Poznań (2)	3–0	Wisła Kraków	Stadion Wojska Polskiego, Warsaw	16,000
1985	Widzew Łódź	0–0 (a.e.t.) (3–1 p)	GKS Katowice	Stadion Wojska Polskiego, Warsaw	12,000
1986	GKS Katowice	4–1	Górnik Zabrze	Stadion Śląski, Chorzów	55,000
1987	Śląsk Wrocław (2)	0–0 (a.e.t.) (4–3 p)	GKS Katowice	Stadion Miejski, Opole	12,000
1988	Lech Poznań (3)	1–1 (a.e.t.) (3–2 p)	Legia Warsaw	Stadion Widzewa, Łódź	10,000
1989	Legia Warsaw (8)	5–2	Jagiellonia Białystok	Stadion Miejski, Olsztyn	20,000
1990	Legia Warsaw (9)	2–0	GKS Katowice	Stadion Widzewa, Łódź	7,000
1991	GKS Katowice (2)	1–0	Legia Warsaw	Stadion Miejski, Piotrków Trybunalski	7,000
1992	Miedź Legnica	1-1 (a.e.t.) (4–3 p)	Górnik Zabrze	Stadion Wojska Polskiego, Warsaw	5,000
1993	GKS Katowice (3)	1–1 (a.e.t.) (5–4 p)	Ruch II Chorzów	Stadion Śląski, Chorzów	10,000
1994	Legia Warsaw (10)	2–0	ŁKS Łódź	Stadion Wojska Polskiego, Warsaw	20,000
1995	Legia Warsaw (11)	2–0	GKS Katowice	Stadion Wojska Polskiego, Warsaw	17,000
1996	Ruch Chorzów (3)	1–0	GKS Bełchatów	Stadion Polonii, Warsaw	10,000
1997	Legia Warsaw (12)	2–0	GKS Katowice	Stadion ŁKS-u, Łódź	6,000
1998	Amica Wronki	5–3 (a.e.t.)	Aluminium Konin	Stadion Miejski, Poznań	10,000
1999	Amica Wronki (2)	1–0	GKS Bełchatów	Stadion Miejski, Poznań	3,000
2000	Amica Wronki (3)	2–2	Wisła Kraków	Stadion Miejski, Kraków	8,000
2000	Amica Wronki (3)	3–0	Wisła Kraków	Stadion Amiki, Wronki	5,500
2001	Polonia Warsaw (2)	2–1	Górnik Zabrze	Stadion Miejski, Zabrze	2,216
2001	Polonia Warsaw (2)	2–2	Górnik Zabrze	Stadion Polonii, Warsaw	3,500
2002	Wisła Kraków (3)	4–2	Amica Wronki	Stadion Amiki, Wronki	2,500
2002	Wisła Kraków (3)	4–0	Amica Wronki	Stadion Miejski, Kraków	7,000
2003	Wisła Kraków (4)	0–1	Wisła Płock	Stadion Miejski, Kraków	4,000
2003	Wisła Kraków (4)	3–0	Wisła Płock	Stadion Miejski, Płock	10,000
2004	Lech Poznań (4)	2–0	Legia Warsaw	Stadion Miejski, Poznań	26,000
2004	Lech Poznań (4)	0–1	Legia Warsaw	Stadion Wojska Polskiego, Warsaw	15,000
2005	~~Dyskobolia Grodzisk Wielkopolski~~ (Note: Dyskobolia Grodzisk Wlkp. won 2–1 on aggregate, but on 2 September 2020, they were deprived of this title in connection with proven cases of corruption and the trophy was not awarded to any team.)	2–0	Zagłębie Lubin	Stadion Dyskobolii, Grodzisk Wielkopolski	4,000
2005	~~Dyskobolia Grodzisk Wielkopolski~~	0–1	Zagłębie Lubin	Stadion Zagłębia, Lubin	8,000
2006	Wisła Płock	3–2	Zagłębie Lubin	Stadion Zagłębia, Lubin	8,000
2006	Wisła Płock	3–1	Zagłębie Lubin	Stadion Miejski, Płock	8,520
2007	Dyskobolia Grodzisk Wielkopolski	2–0	Korona Kielce	Stadion Miejski, Bełchatów	5,500
2008	Legia Warsaw (13)	0–0 (a.e.t.) (4–3 p)	Wisła Kraków	Stadion Miejski, Bełchatów	5,000
2009	Lech Poznań (5)	1–0	Ruch Chorzów	Silesian Stadium, Chorzów	25,000
2010	Jagiellonia Białystok	1–0	Pogoń Szczecin	Stadion Miejski, Bydgoszcz	13,300
2011	Legia Warsaw (14)	1–1 (a.e.t.) (5–4 p)	Lech Poznań	Stadion Miejski, Bydgoszcz	18,200
2012	Legia Warsaw (15)	3–0	Ruch Chorzów	Stadion Miejski, Kielce	10,100
2013	Legia Warsaw (16)	2–0	Śląsk Wrocław	Stadion Miejski, Wrocław	35,000
2013	Legia Warsaw (16)	0–1	Śląsk Wrocław	Stadion Wojska Polskiego, Warsaw	29,416
2014	Zawisza Bydgoszcz	0–0 (a.e.t.) (6–5 p)	Zagłębie Lubin	Stadion Narodowy, Warsaw	37,120
2015	Legia Warsaw (17)	2–1	Lech Poznań	Stadion Narodowy, Warsaw	45,322
2016	Legia Warsaw (18)	1–0	Lech Poznań	Stadion Narodowy, Warsaw	48,563
2017	Arka Gdynia (2)	2–1 (a.e.t.)	Lech Poznań	Stadion Narodowy, Warsaw	43,760
2018	Legia Warsaw (19)	2–1	Arka Gdynia	Stadion Narodowy, Warsaw	47,037
2019	Lechia Gdańsk (2)	1–0	Jagiellonia Białystok	Stadion Narodowy, Warsaw	44,158
2020	Cracovia	3–2 (a.e.t.)	Lechia Gdańsk	Arena Lublin, Lublin	3,478
2021	Raków Częstochowa	2–1	Arka Gdynia	Arena Lublin, Lublin	0
2022	Raków Częstochowa (2)	3–1	Lech Poznań	Stadion Narodowy, Warsaw	35,694
2023	Legia Warsaw (20)	0–0 (a.e.t.) (6–5 p)	Raków Częstochowa	Stadion Narodowy, Warsaw	44,701
2024	Wisła Kraków (5)	2–1 (a.e.t.)	Pogoń Szczecin	Stadion Narodowy, Warsaw	47,506
2025	Legia Warsaw (21)	4–3	Pogoń Szczecin	Stadion Narodowy, Warsaw	51,233
2026	Górnik Zabrze (7)	2–0	Raków Częstochowa	Stadion Narodowy, Warsaw	50,072

== Performances ==
=== Performance by club ===
Club	Winners	Runners-up	Winning years	Runner-up years
Legia Warsaw	21	6	1955, 1956, 1964, 1966, 1973, 1980, 1981, 1989, 1990, 1994, 1995, 1997, 2008, 2011, 2012, 2013, 2015, 2016, 2018, 2023, 2025	1952, 1969, 1972, 1988, 1991, 2004
Górnik Zabrze	7	7	1965, 1968, 1969, 1970, 1971, 1972, 2026	1956, 1957, 1962, 1966, 1986, 1992, 2001
Wisła Kraków	5	6	1926, 1967, 2002, 2003, 2024	1951, 1954, 1979, 1984, 2000, 2008
Lech Poznań	5	6	1982, 1984, 1988, 2004, 2009	1980, 2011, 2015, 2016, 2017, 2022
Zagłębie Sosnowiec	4	1	1962, 1963, 1977, 1978	1971
Ruch Chorzów	3	6	1951, 1974, 1996	1963, 1968, 1970, 1993, 2009, 2012
GKS Katowice	3	5	1986, 1991, 1993	1985, 1987, 1990, 1995, 1997
Amica Wronki	3	1	1998, 1999, 2000	2002
Raków Częstochowa	2	3	2021, 2022	1967, 2023, 2026
Arka Gdynia	2	2	1979, 2017	2018, 2021
Lechia Gdańsk	2	2	1983, 2019	1955, 2020
Śląsk Wrocław	2	1	1976, 1987	2013
Polonia Warsaw	2	–	1952, 2001	–
Jagiellonia Białystok	1	2	2010	1989, 2019
Gwardia Warsaw	1	1	1954	1974
ŁKS Łódź	1	1	1957	1994
Wisła Płock	1	1	2006	2003
Stal Rzeszów	1	–	1975	–
Widzew Łódź	1	–	1985	–
Miedź Legnica	1	–	1992	–
Dyskobolia Grodzisk	1	–	2007	–
Zawisza Bydgoszcz	1	–	2014	–
Cracovia	1	–	2020	–
Pogoń Szczecin	–	5	–	1981, 1982, 2010, 2024, 2025
Polonia Bytom	–	3	–	1964, 1973, 1977
Zagłębie Lubin	–	3	–	2005, 2006, 2014
Piast Gliwice	–	2	–	1978, 1983
GKS Bełchatów	–	2	–	1996, 1999
Sparta Lwów	–	1	–	1926
Czarni Żagań	–	1	–	1965
ROW Rybnik	–	1	–	1975
Stal Mielec	–	1	–	1976
Aluminium Konin	–	1	–	1998
Korona Kielce	–	1	–	2007

== See also ==
- Football in Poland
- Polish Championship in Football
- Polish Super Cup
