= 2011–12 Ekstraklasa =

86th season of top-tier football league in Poland

Ekstraklasa
- Season: 2011–12
- Champions: Śląsk Wrocław (2nd title)
- Relegated: ŁKS Łódź; Cracovia
- Champions League: Śląsk Wrocław
- Europa League: Ruch Chorzów; Legia Warsaw; Lech Poznań
- Matches: 240
- Goals: 527 (2.2 per match)
- Top goalscorer: Artjoms Rudņevs (22 goals)
- Biggest home win: GKS 6–0 Podbeskidzie
- Biggest away win: ŁKS 0–5 Lech
- Highest scoring: GKS 6–0 Podbeskidzie; Widzew 4–2 Jagiellonia; Zagłębie 1–5 Śląsk
- Longest winning run: 5 games Zagłębie Lubin
- Longest unbeaten run: 9 games Korona Kielce, Lech Poznań, Ruch Chorzów
- Longest winless run: 11 games ŁKS Łódź
- Longest losing run: 4 games Zagłębie Lubin
- Highest attendance: 42,771; Śląsk 1–0 Lechia (28 October 2011)
- Lowest attendance: 199; Ruch 2–2 ŁKS Łódź (28 April 2012)
- Total attendance: 2,127,600
- Average attendance: 8,865 ▲4.4%

The 2011–12 Ekstraklasa (also known as T-Mobile Ekstraklasa due to its sponsorship by T-Mobile Polska) was the 78th season of the highest level of football leagues in Poland since its establishment in 1927. It started on 29 July 2011 and concluded on 6 May 2012. A total of 16 teams participated, 14 of which competed in the league during the 2010–11 season, while the remaining two were promoted from the 2010–11 season of the I Liga. Each team played a total of 30 matches, half at home and half away.

Śląsk Wrocław won the title, which marked their 2nd title in Ekstraklasa history.

The defending champions were Wisła Kraków, who won their 13th Polish championship in the previous season.

== Teams ==
Arka Gdynia and Polonia Bytom were relegated to the I Liga after finishing last season in the 2 bottom places and were replaced by ŁKS Łódź, winners of the 2010–11 I Liga season and runners-up Podbeskidzie Bielsko-Biała.

Therefore, ŁKS Łódź returned to the Ekstraklasa after a 2-season break, while Podbeskidzie Bielsko-Biała made their first Ekstraklasa appearance in the club's history.

=== Stadiums and locations ===
Location of teams and stadiums in Ekstraklasa 2011–12
Location of teams in the Katowice urban area

Team	Location	Venue	Capacity	Notes
Cracovia	Kraków	Stadion im. Józefa Piłsudskiego	15,016	
GKS Bełchatów	Bełchatów	GIEKSA Arena	5,238	
Górnik Zabrze	Zabrze	Stadion im. Ernesta Pohla	3,500	Upgrading to 31,643
Jagiellonia Białystok	Białystok	Stadion Jagiellonii	6,000	Upgrading to 22,400
Korona Kielce	Kielce	Arena Kielce	15,550	
Lech Poznań	Poznań	Stadion Lecha	43,098	
Lechia Gdańsk	Gdańsk	PGE Arena	44,636	
Legia Warsaw	Warsaw	Pepsi Arena	31,800	
Łódzki KS	Łódź	Stadion ŁKS	12,160	Upgrading to 30,000
Podbeskidzie Bielsko-Biała	Bielsko-Biała	Stadion BBOSiR	4,286	Upgrading to 15,292
Polonia Warsaw	Warsaw	Stadion Polonii	7,150	
Ruch Chorzów	Chorzów	Stadion Ruchu	10,000	
Śląsk Wrocław	Wrocław	Stadion Wrocław	44,416	
Widzew Łódź	Łódź	Stadion Widzewa	10,500	
Wisła Kraków	Kraków	Stadion im. Henryka Reymana	33,680	
Zagłębie Lubin	Lubin	Dialog Arena	16,300	

=== Sponsoring and personnel ===
Club	Manager	2010-11 Season	Kit manufacturer	Shirt sponsor
Cracovia	(Poland) Tomasz Kafarski	14th	Nike	Comarch
GKS Bełchatów	(Poland) Kamil Kiereś	10th	adidas	Polska Grupa Energetyczna
Górnik Zabrze	(Poland) Adam Nawałka	6th	Erima	Allianz
Jagiellonia Białystok	(Poland) Tomasz Hajto	4th	Joma	Eurocash
Korona Kielce	(Poland) Leszek Ojrzyński	13th	Hummel	Lewiatan
Lech Poznań	(Poland) Mariusz Rumak	5th	Puma	s.Oliver
Lechia Gdańsk	(Poland) Paweł Janas	8th	adidas	LOTOS
Legia Warsaw	(Poland) Maciej Skorża	3rd	adidas	ActiveJet
ŁKS Łódź	(Poland) Andrzej Pyrdoł	Promoted	Zina	Colorit
Podbeskidzie Bielsko-Biała	(Poland) Robert Kasperczyk	Promoted	adidas	Murapol
Polonia Warsaw	(Poland) Czesław Michniewicz	7th	Hummel	pl:J.W. Construction
Ruch Chorzów	(Poland) Waldemar Fornalik	12th	Lotto	WOŚP
Śląsk Wrocław	(Poland) Orest Lenczyk	2nd	Puma	TAURON
Widzew Łódź	(Poland) Radosław Mroczkowski	9th	Vigo	Harnaś
Wisła Kraków	(Poland) Michał Probierz	Champions	adidas	Tele-Fonika Kable
Zagłębie Lubin	(Czech Republic) Pavel Hapal	11th	Nike	KGHM Polska Miedź

=== Managerial changes ===
Club	Outgoing Manager	Date of vacancy	Manner of departure	Incoming Manager	Date of appointment
GKS Bełchatów	(Poland) Maciej Bartoszek	1 June 2011	Sacked	(Poland) Paweł Janas	17 June 2011
Korona Kielce	(Poland) Włodzimierz Gąsior	9 June 2011	Temporary Manager	(Poland) Leszek Ojrzyński	9 June 2011
Widzew Łódź	(Poland) Czesław Michniewicz	22 June 2011	Resigned	(Poland) Radosław Mroczkowski	24 June 2011
Jagiellonia Białystok	(Poland) Michał Probierz	22 July 2011	Resigned	(Poland) Czesław Michniewicz	22 July 2011
ŁKS Łódź	(Poland) Andrzej Pyrdoł	1 August 2011	Resigned	(Poland) Dariusz Bratkowski	1 August 2011
GKS Bełchatów	(Poland) Paweł Janas	31 August 2011	Resigned	(Poland) Kamil Kiereś	1 September 2011
ŁKS Łódź	(Poland) Dariusz Bratkowski	4 September 2011	Sacked	(Poland) Michał Probierz	5 September 2011
Cracovia	(Ukraine) Yuriy Shatalov	22 September 2011	Resigned	(Poland) Dariusz Pasieka	23 September 2011
Zagłębie Lubin	(Poland) Jan Urban	31 October 2011	Sacked	(Czech Republic) Pavel Hapal	31 October 2011
ŁKS Łódź	(Poland) Michał Probierz	3 November 2011	Resigned	(Poland) Tomasz Wieszczycki (temporary)	4 November 2011
ŁKS Łódź	(Poland) Tomasz Wieszczycki	7 November 2011	Temporary Manager	(Poland) Ryszard Tarasiewicz	7 November 2011
Wisła Kraków	(Netherlands) Robert Maaskant	7 November 2011	Sacked	(Poland) Kazimierz Moskal	8 November 2011
Lechia Gdańsk	(Poland) Tomasz Kafarski	8 November 2011	Sacked	(Poland) Rafał Ulatowski	9 November 2011
Lechia Gdańsk	(Poland) Rafał Ulatowski	14 December 2011	Sacked	(Poland) Paweł Janas	19 December 2011
Jagiellonia Białystok	(Poland) Czesław Michniewicz	22 December 2011	Sacked	(Poland) Tomasz Hajto	10 February 2012
ŁKS Łódź	(Poland) Ryszard Tarasiewicz	1 February 2012	Resigned	(Poland) Andrzej Pyrdoł	8 February 2012
Lech Poznań	(Spain) José Mari Bakero	25 February 2012	Sacked	(Poland) Mariusz Rumak	27 February 2012
Wisła Kraków	(Poland) Kazimierz Moskal	1 March 2012	Sacked	(Poland) Michał Probierz	1 March 2012
Cracovia	(Poland) Dariusz Pasieka	6 March 2012	Sacked	(Poland) Tomasz Kafarski	7 March 2012
Polonia Warsaw	(Poland) Jacek Zieliński	27 March 2012	Sacked	(Poland) Czesław Michniewicz	28 March 2012

== League table ==
Pos	Team	Pld	W	D	L	GF	GA	GD	Pts	Qualification or relegation
1	Śląsk Wrocław (C)	30	17	5	8	47	31	+16	56	Qualification to Champions League second qualifying round
2	Ruch Chorzów	30	16	7	7	44	28	+16	55	Qualification to Europa League second qualifying round
3	Legia Warsaw	30	15	8	7	42	17	+25	53	Qualification to Europa League second qualifying round (Note: As the winners of the 2011–12 Polish Cup, Legia qualified for the second qualifying round of the 2012–13 UEFA Europa League. Since they finished third in the league, the fourth-placed team of the league also qualified for the Europa League.)
4	Lech Poznań	30	15	7	8	42	22	+20	52	Qualification to Europa League first qualifying round
5	Korona Kielce	30	13	9	8	34	29	+5	48	
6	Polonia Warsaw	30	13	6	11	33	32	+1	45	
7	Wisła Kraków	30	12	7	11	29	26	+3	43	
8	Górnik Zabrze	30	11	9	10	36	30	+6	42	
9	Zagłębie Lubin	30	11	7	12	36	42	−6	40	
10	Jagiellonia Białystok	30	11	6	13	35	45	−10	39 (Note: WID 4–2 JAG; JAG 4–1 WID)	
11	Widzew Łódź	30	9	12	9	25	26	−1	39	
12	Podbeskidzie Bielsko-Biała	30	9	8	13	26	39	−13	35	
13	Lechia Gdańsk	30	7	10	13	21	30	−9	31 (Note: LGD 0–0 GKS; GKS 1–3 LGD)	
14	GKS Bełchatów	30	7	10	13	34	36	−2	31	
15	ŁKS Łódź (R)	30	5	9	16	23	53	−30	24	Relegation to I liga
16	Cracovia (R)	30	4	10	16	20	41	−21	22	Relegation to I liga

Source: 90minut.pl (in Polish)
Rules for classification: 1) points; 2) head-to-head points; 3) head-to-head goal difference; 4) head-to-head goals scored; 5) goal difference; 6) number of goals scored; 7) Fair Play table. Head-to-head record is used only after all the matches between the teams in question have been played
(C) Champions; (R) Relegated

== Results ==
Home \ Away	CRA	BEŁ	GÓR	JAG	KOR	LPO	LGD	LEG	ŁKS	PBB	PWA	RUC	ŚLĄ	WID	WIS	ZLU
Cracovia		2–1	1–3	0–0	1–2	0–3	1–1	1–3	0–1	3–1	0–0	0–2	0–1	0–0	1–0	0–2
GKS Bełchatów	2–2		1–1	2–0	0–2	0–3	1–3	0–2	3–0	6–0	2–1	1–1	3–0	0–0	2–2	2–1
Górnik Zabrze	0–1	1–0		2–0	2–0	2–1	2–2	2–0	0–0	3–0	1–0	1–2	0–2	1–1	2–0	4–1
Jagiellonia Białystok	2–1	1–0	2–1		1–1	2–0	2–1	0–0	2–1	0–2	3–2	0–1	0–2	4–1	1–0	3–1
Korona Kielce	0–0	2–2	2–0	2–0		2–2	1–0	1–0	0–2	2–0	3–0	2–2	2–1	0–2	0–0	0–2
Lech Poznań	3–1	0–1	1–0	4–1	1–0		2–1	0–0	4–0	1–0	1–0	3–0	2–0	0–1	0–1	3–2
Lechia Gdańsk	1–1	0–0	2–1	0–1	0–0	0–0		1–0	0–0	2–3	1–3	1–0	1–1	0–0	0–2	0–1
Legia Warsaw	0–0	1–1	3–1	1–1	1–0	0–1	3–0		2–0	1–2	0–0	2–0	1–2	2–0	2–0	3–0
ŁKS Łódź	2–2	1–1	1–1	1–1	0–2	0–5	0–0	1–3		2–1	0–2	0–4	1–2	1–1	1–2	1–2
Podbeskidzie Bielsko-Biała	1–0	1–0	1–1	2–2	2–3	0–0	1–0	0–1	0–1		1–1	0–1	1–1	0–0	1–3	1–0
Polonia Warsaw	2–1	2–1	1–1	4–1	0–0	1–0	1–0	2–1	2–0	2–2		0–1	3–0	1–2	1–1	0–4
Ruch Chorzów	2–0	2–1	0–0	1–0	4–1	3–0	2–1	0–1	2–2	2–2	0–1		0–1	3–1	1–0	2–1
Śląsk Wrocław	3–0	1–0	1–1	3–1	1–2	3–1	1–0	0–4	4–0	1–0	4–0	1–1		1–2	0–1	2–1
Widzew Łódź	1–0	1–0	2–0	4–2	0–0	0–0	0–1	1–1	0–1	0–1	1–0	1–2	2–2		1–1	0–0
Wisła Kraków	1–0	2–0	0–1	3–1	0–1	0–0	0–1	0–0	3–2	0–1	0–1	3–2	0–1	1–0		1–0
Zagłębie Lubin	1–1	1–1	2–1	2–1	3–1	1–1	0–1	0–4	2–1	0–0	1–0	1–1	1–5	1–0	2–2	

Source: (in Polish)
Legend: Blue = home team win; Yellow = draw; Red = away team win.

== Player statistics ==
=== Top goalscorers ===
Rank	Player	Club	Goals
1	(Latvia) Artjoms Rudņevs	Lech Poznań	22
2	(Poland) Tomasz Frankowski	Jagiellonia Białystok	15
3	(Poland) Arkadiusz Piech	Ruch Chorzów	12
4	(Israel) Dudu Biton	Wisła Kraków	11
4	(Albania) Edgar Çani	Polonia Warsaw	11
4	(Serbia) Danijel Ljuboja	Legia Warsaw	11
7	(Burkina Faso) Prejuce Nakoulma	Górnik Zabrze	9
8	(Poland) Maciej Jankowski	Ruch Chorzów	8
8	(Poland) Szymon Pawłowski	Zagłębie Lubin	8
10	(Bulgaria) Tsvetan Genkov	Wisła Kraków	7

=== Top assistants ===
Rank	Player	Club	Assists
1	(Poland) Sebastian Mila	Śląsk Wrocław	12
2	(Poland) Kamil Kosowski	GKS Bełchatów	9
2	(Poland) Mariusz Magiera	Górnik Zabrze	9
4	(Poland) Tomasz Kupisz	Jagiellonia Białystok	7
4	(Poland) Sylwester Patejuk	Podbeskidzie Bielsko-Biała	7
6	(Bosnia and Herzegovina) Semir Štilić	Lech Poznań	6
6	(Poland) Maciej Rybus	Legia Warsaw	6
6	(Poland) Marek Zieńczuk	Ruch Chorzów	6
9	(Poland) Dawid Plizga	Jagiellonia Białystok	5
9	(Poland) Mateusz Możdżeń	Lech Poznań	5
9	(Slovakia) Gábor Straka	Ruch Chorzów	5

== Awards ==
=== Monthly awards ===
==== Player of the Month ====
Month	Player	Club
August 2011	(Serbia) Danijel Ljuboja	Legia Warsaw
September 2011	(Latvia) Artjoms Rudņevs	Lech Poznań
October 2011	(Poland) Piotr Celeban	Śląsk Wrocław
November 2011	(Burkina Faso) Prejuce Nakoulma	Górnik Zabrze
March 2012	(Poland) Arkadiusz Piech	Ruch Chorzów
April 2012	(Poland) Adam Banaś	Zagłębie Lubin

==== Coach of the Month ====
Month	Coach	Club
August 2011	(Poland) Radosław Mroczkowski	Widzew Łódź
September 2011	(Poland) Orest Lenczyk	Śląsk Wrocław
October 2011	(Poland) Maciej Skorża	Legia Warsaw
November 2011	(Poland) Waldemar Fornalik	Ruch Chorzów
March 2012	(Poland) Waldemar Fornalik	Ruch Chorzów
April 2012	(Poland) Mariusz Rumak	Lech Poznań

=== Annual awards ===
Award	Player	Club
Player of the Season	(Poland) Arkadiusz Piech	Ruch Chorzów
Coach of the Season	(Poland) Waldemar Fornalik	Ruch Chorzów
Discovery of the Season	(Poland) Rafał Wolski	Legia Warsaw

== Attendances ==
No.	Club	Average	Highest
1	Legia Warszawa	20,928	29,017
2	Lechia Gdańsk	17,372	34,444
3	Śląsk Wrocław	16,962	40,000
4	Wisła Kraków	16,402	24,010
5	Lech Poznań	15,757	33,125
6	Cracovia	8,580	14,055
7	Korona Kielce	7,870	10,661
8	Zagłębie Lubin	6,492	11,115
9	Widzew Łódź	6,395	9,770
10	Ruch Chorzów	5,827	9,500
11	Jagiellonia Białystok	4,084	4,907
12	Polonia Warszawa	3,652	6,500
13	Podbeskidzie Bielsko-Biala	3,492	4,279
14	Górnik Zabrze	3,060	3,500
15	ŁKS	2,653	3,900
16	Bełchatów	2,055	3,300

== See also ==
- 2011–12 Polish Cup
