= 2010–11 Ekstraklasa =

85th season of top-tier football league in Poland

Ekstraklasa
- Season: 2010–11
- Champions: Wisła Kraków; 14th Ekstraklasa title 13th Polish title
- Relegated: Arka Gdynia; Polonia Bytom
- Champions League: Wisła Kraków
- Europa League: Legia Warsaw; Śląsk Wrocław; Jagiellonia Białystok
- Matches: 240
- Goals: 578 (2.41 per match)
- Top goalscorer: Tomasz Frankowski (14 goals)
- Biggest home win: Lech 5–0 Cracovia; Śląsk 5–0 Arka
- Biggest away win: Korona 1–4 Legia
- Highest scoring: Widzew 5–2 Śląsk; Wisła 5–2 Lechia
- Longest winning run: 7 games Wisła Kraków
- Longest unbeaten run: 14 games Śląsk Wrocław
- Longest winless run: 10 games Korona Kielce
- Longest losing run: 6 games Cracovia
- Highest attendance: 36,240; Lech 1–0 Legia (16 April 2011)
- Lowest attendance: 0 Legia 3–1 Korona (6 May 2011); Lech 2–0 Górnik (7 May 2011); Śląsk 4–2 Bełchatów (14 May 2011); Widzew 2–1 Zagłębie (15 May 2011); Zagłębie 0–3 Wisła (25 May 2011)
- Total attendance: 2,039,040
- Average attendance: 8,496 ▲61.9%

The 2010–11 Ekstraklasa was the 77th season of the highest level of football leagues in Poland since its establishment in 1927. It began on 6 August 2010 and concluded on 29 May 2011. A total of 16 teams participated, 14 of which competed in the league during the 2009–10 season, while the remaining two were promoted from the I Liga. Each team played a total of 30 matches, half at home and half away.

Wisła Kraków won the title, which marked their 13th title in total.

Wisła Kraków qualified as champions for the 2nd qualifying round of the 2011–12 UEFA Champions League, while Śląsk Wrocław, as the runner-up, entered the 2nd qualifying round of the 2011–12 UEFA Europa League, followed by the fourth placed Jagiellonia Białystok team that earned a place in the 1st qualifying round of the Europa League. Legia Warsaw, the winner of the 2010–11 Polish Cup, also earned a place in European competition by qualifying to the 3rd qualifying round of the Europa League.

The defending champions were Lech Poznań, who won their sixth Polish championship last season.

== Teams ==
Promotion and relegation was established by a change, which eliminated relegation play-off games after the 2008–09 season. Thus, the 14th team from the Ekstraklasa and the 3rd team from the Polish First League no longer competed against each other in play-offs. Following the change, promotion and relegation were determined solely by a team's position in the table. As usual, the bottom two teams were directly relegated to the I Liga, while the top two teams were promoted to the Ekstraklasa.

Odra Wodzisław and Piast Gliwice finished in 15th and 16th place, respectively, and were directly relegated to the Polish First League as a result. Odra Wodzisław returned to the second tier after spending 14 years in the top division, their first appearance being in the 1996–97 season. Piast Gliwice spent just two seasons in the Ekstraklasa, after being promoted for the first time for the 2008–09 season, having spent the previous 71 seasons in the lower leagues.

Promotion was won by 2009–10 2nd level champions Widzew Łódź, who returned to the top division after being relegated in the 2007–08 season. 14-time Ekstraklasa champions Górnik Zabrze finished as runners-up in the I Liga and made their comeback to the top tier after being relegated in the 2008–09 season.

=== Stadiums and locations ===
Since and prior to the selection of Poland as co-host for Euro 2012, numerous clubs were engaged in reconstruction of their stadiums, or building a completely new stadium. Some teams in the beginning of the season played their home matches in other stadiums. For instance Wisła Kraków played their home matches at the Hutnik Kraków stadium, the Stadion Suche Stawy, which held 12,000 spectators. However, the move to the nearly completed 33,000-plus home stadium was in effect mid-season. Legia Warsaw and Lech Poznań played at stadiums which remained under construction but nearing completion. Dialog Arena, the home venue of Zagłębie Lubin was the newest completely finished stadium in the Ekstraklasa these season, being completed just before the start of the season.

Arka Gdynia, and Cracovia started the season playing in their old stadiums. The two clubs moved to their completely finished new stadiums mid season. Jagiellonia Białystok, Lechia Gdańsk, and Śląsk Wrocław played in their old stadiums while their new venues were being constructed. The 40,000 plus PGE Arena Gdańsk became the new home ground for Lechia after its completion in 2011, while Śląsk moved to the new 45,000 plus Stadion Wrocław. The two stadiums were venues for Euro 2012.

Location of teams and stadium in 2010–11 Ekstraklasa
Location of teams in the Katowice urban area

Team	Location	Venue	Capacity
Arka Gdynia	Gdynia	GOSiR Stadium	15,139
Cracovia	Kraków	Marshal Józef Piłsudski Stadium	15,016
GKS Bełchatów	Bełchatów	GIEKSA Arena	5,238
Górnik Zabrze	Zabrze	Ernest Pohl Stadium	10,000
Jagiellonia Białystok	Białystok	Jagiellonia Stadium	6,000 (upgrading to 22,500)
Korona Kielce	Kielce	Arena Kielce	15,550
Lech Poznań	Poznań	Lech Stadium	43,000
Lechia Gdańsk	Gdańsk	Lechia Stadium	11,811 (upgrading to 40,818)
Legia Warsaw	Warsaw	Polish Army Stadium	31,800
Polonia Bytom	Bytom	Edward Szymkowiak Stadium	6,000
Polonia Warsaw	Warsaw	Polonia Stadium	7,150
Ruch Chorzów	Chorzów	Ruch Stadium	10,000
Śląsk Wrocław	Wrocław	Oporowska Stadium	8,346 (upgrading to 42,720)
Widzew Łódź	Łódź	Stadion Widzewa	10,500
Wisła Kraków	Kraków	Henryk Reyman Stadium	24,000 (upgrading to 33,680)
Zagłębie Lubin	Lubin	Dialog Arena	16,300

=== Sponsoring and personnel ===
Club	Manager	2009–10 Season	Kit sponsor	Main sponsor
Arka Gdynia	(Czech Republic) František Straka	14th	Jako	Polnord
Cracovia	(Ukraine) Yuriy Shatalov	12th	Jako	Comarch
GKS Bełchatów	(Poland) Maciej Bartoszek	5th	Adidas	Polska Grupa Energetyczna
Górnik Zabrze	(Poland) Adam Nawałka	Promoted	Erima	Allianz
Jagiellonia Białystok	(Poland) Michał Probierz	11th	Joma	Białystok City
Korona Kielce	(Poland) Włodzimierz Gąsior	6th	Hummel	Formaster
Lech Poznań	(Spain) José Mari Bakero	Champions	Puma	s.Oliver
Lechia Gdańsk	(Poland) Tomasz Kafarski	8th	Adidas	LOTOS
Legia Warsaw	(Poland) Maciej Skorża	4th	Adidas	n
Polonia Bytom	(Poland) Dariusz Fornalak	7th	Hummel	Ecco Holiday
Polonia Warsaw	(Poland) Jacek Zieliński	13th	Hummel	J.W. Construction
Ruch Chorzów	(Poland) Waldemar Fornalik	3rd	Lotto	Tauron Poland Energy
Śląsk Wrocław	(Poland) Orest Lenczyk	9th	Puma	Piast
Widzew Łódź	(Poland) Czesław Michniewicz	Promoted	Vigo	Harnaś
Wisła Kraków	(Netherlands) Robert Maaskant	2nd	Adidas	Tele-Fonika Kable
Zagłębie Lubin	(Poland) Jan Urban	10th	Nike	KGHM Polska Miedź

Puma continues as Ekstraklasa's official match ball suppliers through the 2010–11 season. All matches are played with the PUMA PowerCat 1.10 ultra balls, which is a special model created just for the Ekstraklasa.

The official presentation of the new ball for Ekstraklasa was prepared together with PUMA Poland in the beginning of August 2010 – just before the start of season. The case of prolonging the use of the match ball for the next two seasons was made official on 3 August 2010. The new model will be used through the 2011–12 season as it is regarded at the highest quality .

=== Managerial changes ===
Club	Outgoing Manager	Date of vacancy	Manner of departure	Incoming Manager	Date of appointment
GKS Bełchatów	(Poland) Rafał Ulatowski	21 May 2010	End of Contract	(Poland) Maciej Bartoszek	2 June 2010
Cracovia	(Poland) Orest Lenczyk	24 May 2010	Sacked	(Poland) Rafał Ulatowski	28 May 2010
Legia Warsaw	(Poland) Stefan Białas	25 May 2010	Sacked	(Poland) Maciej Skorża	1 June 2010
Widzew Łódź	(Poland) Paweł Janas	21 June 2010	Resigned	(Poland) Andrzej Kretek	25 June 2010
Wisła Kraków	(Poland) Henryk Kasperczak	6 August 2010	Sacked	(Poland) Tomasz Kulawik (temporary)	6 August 2010
Wisła Kraków	(Poland) Tomasz Kulawik	21 August 2010	Temporary Manager	(Netherlands) Robert Maaskant	21 August 2010
Polonia Warsaw	(Spain) José Mari Bakero	13 September 2010	Sacked	(Poland) Paweł Janas	13 September 2010
Śląsk Wrocław	(Poland) Ryszard Tarasiewicz	22 September 2010	Sacked	(Poland) Paweł Barylski (temporary)	22 September 2010
Śląsk Wrocław	(Poland) Paweł Barylski	27 September 2010	Temporary Manager	(Poland) Orest Lenczyk	27 September 2010
Cracovia	(Poland) Rafał Ulatowski	24 October 2010	Resigned	(Poland) Marcin Sadko (temporary)	27 October 2010
Polonia Bytom	(Ukraine) Yuriy Shatalov	28 October 2010	Resigned	(Poland) Jan Urban	29 October 2010
Cracovia	(Poland) Marcin Sadko	31 October 2010	Temporary Manager	(Ukraine) Yuriy Shatalov	31 October 2010
Lech Poznań	(Poland) Jacek Zieliński	2 November 2010	Sacked	(Spain) José Mari Bakero	3 November 2010
Widzew Łódź	(Poland) Andrzej Kretek	15 November 2010	Sacked	(Poland) Czesław Michniewicz	15 November 2010
Polonia Bytom	(Poland) Jan Urban	10 December 2010	Resigned	(Poland) Robert Góralczyk	13 December 2010
Polonia Warsaw	(Poland) Paweł Janas	28 December 2010	Sacked	(Netherlands) Theo Bos	6 January 2011
Zagłębie Lubin	(Poland) Marek Bajor	7 March 2011	Sacked	(Poland) Jan Urban	10 March 2011
Polonia Warsaw	(Netherlands) Theo Bos	13 March 2011	Sacked	(Poland) Piotr Stokowiec	14 March 2011
Arka Gdynia	(Poland) Dariusz Pasieka	23 March 2011	Sacked	(Czech Republic) František Straka	23 March 2011
Polonia Warsaw	(Poland) Piotr Stokowiec	24 March 2011	Temporary Manager	(Poland) Jacek Zieliński	24 March 2011
Korona Kielce	(Poland) Marcin Sasal	12 May 2011	Sacked	(Poland) Włodzimierz Gąsior (temporary)	12 May 2011
Polonia Bytom	(Poland) Robert Góralczyk	24 May 2011	Sacked	(Poland) Dariusz Fornalak	24 May 2011

== League table ==
Pos	Team	Pld	W	D	L	GF	GA	GD	Pts	Qualification or relegation
1	Wisła Kraków (C)	30	17	5	8	44	29	+15	56	Qualification to Champions League second qualifying round
2	Śląsk Wrocław	30	13	10	7	46	34	+12	49 (Note: ŚLĄ 0–1 LEG; LEG 1–2 ŚLĄ)	Qualification to Europa League second qualifying round
3	Legia Warsaw	30	15	4	11	45	38	+7	49	Qualification to Europa League third qualifying round (Note: Winners of the 2010–11 Polish Cup.)
4	Jagiellonia Białystok	30	14	6	10	38	32	+6	48	Qualification to Europa League first qualifying round
5	Lech Poznań	30	13	6	11	37	23	+14	45 (Note: GÓR 2–0 LPO; LPO 2–0 GÓR)	
6	Górnik Zabrze	30	13	6	11	36	40	−4	45	
7	Polonia Warsaw	30	12	8	10	41	26	+15	44	
8	Lechia Gdańsk	30	12	7	11	37	36	+1	43 (Note: LGD 3–1 WID; WID 1–0 LGD)	
9	Widzew Łódź	30	11	10	9	41	34	+7	43	
10	GKS Bełchatów	30	10	10	10	31	33	−2	40	
11	Zagłębie Lubin	30	10	9	11	31	41	−10	39	
12	Ruch Chorzów	30	10	8	12	29	32	−3	38	
13	Korona Kielce	30	10	7	13	34	49	−15	37	
14	Cracovia	30	8	5	17	37	47	−10	29	
15	Arka Gdynia (R)	30	6	10	14	22	43	−21	28	Relegation to I liga
16	Polonia Bytom (R)	30	6	9	15	29	45	−16	27	Relegation to I liga

Source: 90minut.pl (in Polish)
Rules for classification: 1) points; 2) head-to-head points; 3) head-to-head goal difference; 4) head-to-head goals scored; 5) goal difference; 6) number of goals scored.
(C) Champions; (R) Relegated

== Results ==
Home \ Away	ARK	CRA	BEŁ	GÓR	JAG	KOR	LPO	LGD	LEG	PBY	PWA	RUC	ŚLĄ	WID	WIS	ZLU
Arka Gdynia		3–0	1–0	2–0	1–0	2–1	0–3	2–2	2–5	2–1	0–0	0–2	2–2	1–1	0–1	1–1
Cracovia	2–0		3–2	2–3	3–0	3–0	1–0	3–0	3–3	0–1	3–1	2–3	2–3	1–2	0–1	2–2
GKS Bełchatów	1–1	1–0		1–1	0–0	1–0	1–0	1–0	2–0	2–0	3–2	3–2	0–1	1–0	1–1	0–2
Górnik Zabrze	2–2	1–0	1–0		0–1	2–1	2–0	0–0	1–1	1–1	0–2	1–0	3–1	4–0	1–0	5–1
Jagiellonia Białystok	1–0	4–2	3–1	2–0		4–0	2–0	1–2	0–0	3–0	1–0	2–1	1–1	1–3	2–1	2–0
Korona Kielce	1–0	1–0	3–1	1–0	1–1		0–0	2–3	1–4	3–3	1–3	0–1	2–1	1–2	2–2	1–1
Lech Poznań	0–0	5–0	0–0	2–0	2–0	4–0		2–0	1–0	1–0	2–2	1–0	2–2	1–0	4–1	0–1
Lechia Gdańsk	1–0	1–0	0–0	5–1	1–2	0–1	2–1		2–1	2–0	0–0	0–0	2–0	3–1	0–3	1–2
Legia Warsaw	3–0	2–1	0–2	2–1	2–0	3–1	2–1	0–3		4–0	1–0	2–3	1–2	1–0	2–0	2–2
Polonia Bytom	2–0	1–2	1–1	1–2	3–2	0–1	1–2	1–1	0–1		0–2	1–0	0–0	2–2	2–2	2–0
Polonia Warsaw	4–0	3–0	0–0	0–0	2–0	1–3	1–0	1–2	3–0	2–2		3–1	0–1	0–1	0–1	2–1
Ruch Chorzów	0–0	1–0	2–1	3–0	0–0	0–1	1–0	0–0	1–0	0–2	0–3		1–2	1–1	2–0	2–2
Śląsk Wrocław	5–0	0–0	4–2	4–0	0–0	0–1	1–2	2–1	0–1	0–0	2–2	2–1		2–2	2–0	3–1
Widzew Łódź	0–0	2–2	1–1	4–0	4–1	3–1	1–1	1–0	0–1	3–1	0–0	0–0	5–2		0–1	2–1
Wisła Kraków	1–0	1–0	3–1	0–2	2–0	2–2	1–0	5–2	4–0	2–1	0–2	3–1	0–0	2–0		1–0
Zagłębie Lubin	1–0	0–0	1–1	1–2	0–2	1–1	1–0	3–1	2–1	2–0	1–0	0–0	0–1	1–0	0–2	

Source: 90minut.pl (in Polish)
Legend: Blue = home team win; Yellow = draw; Red = away team win.

== Player statistics ==
=== Top goalscorers ===
Rank	Player	Club	Goals
1	(Poland) Tomasz Frankowski	Jagiellonia Białystok	14
2	(Poland) Andrzej Niedzielan	Korona Kielce	12
2	(Burkina Faso) Abdou Traoré	Lechia Gdańsk	12
4	(Latvia) Artjoms Rudņevs	Lech Poznań	11
5	(Lithuania) Darvydas Šernas	Widzew Łódź	10
5	(Serbia) Miroslav Radović	Legia Warsaw	10
7	(Poland) Artur Sobiech	Polonia Warsaw	9
7	(Slovenia) Andraž Kirm	Wisła Kraków	9
9	(Poland) Przemysław Kaźmierczak	Śląsk Wrocław	8
9	(Poland) Dawid Nowak	GKS Bełchatów	8
9	(Lithuania) Tadas Labukas	Arka Gdynia	8
9	(Poland) Piotr Grzelczak	Widzew Łódź	8
9	(Poland) Maciej Jankowski	Ruch Chorzów	8
9	(Argentina) Cristián Díaz	Śląsk Wrocław	8

=== Top assistants ===
Rank	Player	Club	Assists
1	(Poland) Sebastian Mila	Śląsk Wrocław	10
2	(Brazil) Edi Andradina	Korona Kielce	9
2	(Brazil) Dudu Paraíba	Widzew Łódź	9
4	(Poland) Artur Sobiech	Polonia Warsaw	8
4	(Poland) Mateusz Klich	Cracovia	8
6	(Serbia) Miroslav Radović	Legia Warsaw	7
6	(Slovenia) Andraž Kirm	Wisła Kraków	7
6	(Poland) Patryk Małecki	Wisła Kraków	7
6	(Poland) Tomasz Kupisz	Jagiellonia Białystok	7
6	(Poland) Maciej Małkowski	GKS Bełchatów	7

== Awards ==
=== Monthly awards ===
==== Player of the Month ====
Month	Player	Club
August 2010	(Poland) Andrzej Niedzielan	Korona Kielce
September 2010	(Poland) Andrzej Niedzielan	Korona Kielce
October 2010	(Poland) Tomasz Frankowski	Jagiellonia Białystok
November 2010	(Poland) Mateusz Bartczak	Zagłębie Lubin
March 2011	(Poland) Przemysław Kaźmierczak	Śląsk Wrocław
April 2011	(Slovakia) Marián Kelemen	Śląsk Wrocław
May 2011	(Poland) Piotr Grzelczak	Widzew Łódź

==== Coach of the Month ====
Month	Coach	Club
March 2011	(Poland) Orest Lenczyk	Śląsk Wrocław
April 2011	(Poland) Waldemar Fornalik	Ruch Chorzów
May 2011	(Poland) Czesław Michniewicz	Widzew Łódź

=== Annual awards ===
Award	Player	Club
Player of the Season	(Poland) Adrian Mierzejewski	Polonia Warsaw
Coach of the Season	(Poland) Orest Lenczyk	Śląsk Wrocław
Discovery of the Season	(Israel) Maor Melikson	Wisła Kraków
Fair Play Award	Lechia Gdańsk	

== Attendances ==
No.	Club	Average	Highest
1	Lech Poznań	18,635	36,240
2	Legia Warszawa	17,139	22,894
3	Wisła Kraków	15,394	24,000
4	Korona Kielce	8,713	14,479
5	Górnik Zabrze	8,700	12,500
6	Cracovia	8,521	14,300
7	Widzew Łódź	8,041	9,600
8	Śląsk Wrocław	7,563	8,500
9	Zagłębie Lubin	7,403	12,155
10	Lechia Gdańsk	7,254	11,811
11	Ruch Chorzów	5,844	9,800
12	Arka Gdynia	5,727	10,500
13	Jagiellonia Białystok	5,651	6,000
14	Polonia Warszawa	4,667	6,000
15	Polonia Bytom	3,617	6,000
16	Bełchatów	3,069	5,300

== See also ==
- 2010–11 Polish Cup
- 2010–11 I Liga
