= Ulatowski =

Ulatowski is Polish surname. See also:

- Rafał Ulatowski, a Polish football manager and former footballer
- Tadeusz Ulatowski, a Polish basketball player and coach.
- Krzysztof Ulatowski, a former Polish footballer
- Zdzisław Ulatowski, a Polish football coach and former footballer
