= 2012–13 Ekstraklasa =

87th season of top-tier football league in Poland

Ekstraklasa
- Season: 2012–13
- Champions: Legia Warsaw (9th title)
- Relegated: Polonia Warsaw; GKS Bełchatów
- Champions League: Legia Warsaw
- Europa League: Lech Poznań; Śląsk Wrocław; Piast Gliwice
- Matches: 240
- Goals: 598 (2.49 per match)
- Top goalscorer: Robert Demjan (14 goals)
- Biggest home win: Korona 5–0 Jagiellonia; Legia 5–0 Śląsk
- Biggest away win: GKS 0–5 Polonia
- Highest scoring: Lechia 4–4 Ruch
- Longest winning run: 7 games Lech Poznań
- Longest unbeaten run: 14 games Legia Warsaw
- Longest winless run: 9 games Podbeskidzie
- Longest losing run: 5 games GKS Bełchatów; Jagiellonia
- Highest attendance: 40,632; Lech 1–3 Legia (18 November 2012)
- Lowest attendance: 1,200; Bełchatów 1–3 Piast (8 December 2012)
- Total attendance: 2,015,930
- Average attendance: 8,409 ▼5.0%

The 2012–13 Ekstraklasa (also known as T-Mobile Ekstraklasa due to its sponsorship by T-Mobile Polska) was the 79th season of the highest level of football leagues in Poland since its establishment in 1927. It began on 17 August 2012 and concluded on 2 June 2013. A total of 16 teams are participating, 14 of which competed in the league during the 2011–12 season, while the remaining two were promoted from the I Liga. Each team played a total of 30 matches, half at home and half away.

Śląsk Wrocław were the defending champions, winning their 2nd title last season, first since the 1976–77 season.

Śląsk Wrocław as reigning champions entered the 2nd qualifying round of the 2012–13 UEFA Champions League. Śląsk defeated the Montenegrin champions Budućnost Podgorica 2–1 on aggregate, but got eliminated in the third qualifying round by the Swedish champions Helsingborg IF 1–6 on aggregate.

Ruch Chorzów, as the runner-up, entered the 2nd qualifying round of the 2012-13 UEFA Europa League, in which they defeated the Macedonian league runners-up Metalurg Skopje 6–1 on aggregate. Ruch got eliminated in the next round by the Czech side Viktoria Plzeň 0–7 on aggregate.

Legia Warsaw whom won the 2011–12 Polish Cup, as well as finishing third last season also qualified for the 2nd qualifying of the Europa League. Legia defeated the Latvian league runner-up Liepājas Metalurgs 7–3 on aggregate. In the third round Legia defeated the Austrian side SV Ried 4–3 on aggregate. Legia were defeated in the Play-off round by the Norwegian side Rosenborg BK 2–3 on aggregate.

Lech Poznań as the fourth placed team earned a place in the 1st qualifying round of the Europa League, since Legia Warsaw won the Polish Cup. Lech first defeated the Kazakh side FC Zhetysu 3–1 on aggregate, in the next round they defeated the Azerbaijani side Khazar Lankaran 2–1 on aggregate. Lech got eliminated in the third round, losing to Swedish side AIK Fotboll 1–3 on aggregate.

On May 15, 2013, the Polish FA announced that Polonia Warsaw won't receive the Ekstraklasa license for 2013–14 season, citing financial issues. The club's appeal was rejected on May 28. As a result, Polonia was relegated to 2013–14 I Liga instead of the 15th placed Ekstraklasa team.

The Polish FA also deemed GKS, Widzew, Pogoń, Polonia and Ruch (financial issues) as well as Podbeskidzie and Jagiellonia (infrastructural reasons) ineligible to compete in UEFA competitions. Śląsk and Wisła, although initially denied the licence due to submitting incomplete financial forecasts, were able to fulfil the requirements during the appeal procedure and received the UEFA licence. Also, the FA's decision to exclude Górnik from the European competitions was cancelled, as the club, whose home stadium is undergoing renovative work, has made arrangements to use another venue as their home field in the event of their qualification to the 2013–14 Europa League. The three clubs were instead fined 100,000 zł (Śląsk), and 20,000 zł (both Wisła and Górnik).

== Teams ==
Promotion and relegation as usual was determined by the position in the table from prior season. The bottom two teams were directly relegated to the I Liga, while the top two teams are promoted to the Ekstraklasa.

ŁKS Łódź and Cracovia finished in 15th and 16th place, respectively, and were directly relegated to the Polish First League as a result. ŁKS Łódź returned to the second tier after just being promoted from the season before. Cracovia spent 8 consecutive seasons in the Ekstraklasa, after returning to the top division for the 2004–05 season.

Promotion was won by 2011–12 I Liga champions Piast Gliwice, who returned to the top division after being relegated in the 2009–10 season. Pogoń Szczecin finished as runners-up in the I Liga and made their comeback to the top tier after 5 years in lower divisions.

=== Stadiums and locations ===
Location of teams in 2012–13 Ekstraklasa
Location of teams in the Katowice urban area

Team	Location	Venue	Capacity
GKS Bełchatów	Bełchatów	GIEKSA Arena	5,238
Górnik Zabrze	Zabrze	Stadion im. Ernesta Pohla^{1}	3,000
Jagiellonia Białystok	Białystok	Stadion Jagiellonii^{2}	5,345
Korona Kielce	Kielce	Arena Kielce	15,550
Lech Poznań	Poznań	Stadion Lecha	43,269
Lechia Gdańsk	Gdańsk	PGE Arena	43,615
Legia Warsaw	Warsaw	Pepsi Arena	31,103
Piast Gliwice	Gliwice	Arena Gliwice	10,037
Podbeskidzie Bielsko-Biała	Bielsko-Biała	Stadion BBOSiR^{3}	4,279
Pogoń Szczecin	Szczecin	Stadion im. Floriana Krygera	18,023
Polonia Warsaw	Warsaw	Stadion Polonii	7,150
Ruch Chorzów	Chorzów	Stadion Ruchu Chorzów	10,000
Śląsk Wrocław	Wrocław	Stadion Wrocław	43,308
Widzew Łódź	Łódź	Stadion Widzewa	10,773
Wisła Kraków	Kraków	Stadion im. Henryka Reymana	33,326
Zagłębie Lubin	Lubin	Stadion Zagłębia	16,086

1. Upgrading to 31,871.
2. Upgrading to 22,400.
3. Upgrading to 15,200.

=== Personnel and kits ===
Note: Flags indicate national team as has been defined under FIFA eligibility rules. Players and Managers may hold more than one non-FIFA nationality.

Team	Manager	Captain	Kit manufacturer	Shirt sponsor
GKS Bełchatów	(Poland) Michał Probierz	(Poland) Grzegorz Baran	adidas	PGE
Górnik Zabrze	(Poland) Adam Nawałka	(Poland) Adam Danch	Erima	Allianz, Kompania Węglowa S.A., Śląskie ^{1}
Jagiellonia Białystok	(Poland) Tomasz Hajto	(Poland) Tomasz Frankowski	Under Armour	Eurocash, Wschodzący Białystok
Korona Kielce	(Poland) Leszek Ojrzyński	(Poland) Kamil Kuzera	adidas	Lewiatan, Targi Kielce
Lech Poznań	(Poland) Mariusz Rumak	(Poland) Rafał Murawski	Puma	Sokołów^{1}, STS ^{2}
Lechia Gdańsk	(Poland) Bogusław Kaczmarek	(Poland) Łukasz Surma	adidas	LOTOS, Gdańsk^{3}, Energa SA^{1}
Legia Warsaw	(Poland) Jan Urban	(Poland) Michał Żewłakow	adidas	ActiveJet, Królewskie^{1}
Piast Gliwice	(Poland) Marcin Brosz	(Poland) Tomasz Podgórski	adidas	Miasto Gliwice
Podbeskidzie Bielsko-Biała	(Poland) Marcin Sasal	(Poland) Marek Sokołowski	adidas	Murapol, Aqua
Pogoń Szczecin	(Poland) Artur Skowronek	(Poland) Bartosz Ława	Nike	Bosman
Polonia Warsaw	(Poland) Piotr Stokowiec	(Poland) Łukasz Piątek	hummel	IDEON
Ruch Chorzów	(Poland) Jacek Zieliński	(Poland) Marcin Malinowski	adidas	Węglokoks
Śląsk Wrocław	(Czech Republic) Stanislav Levý	(Poland) Sebastian Mila	Puma	TAURON
Widzew Łódź	(Poland) Radosław Mroczkowski	(Poland) Maciej Mielcarz	Vigo	Harnaś
Wisła Kraków	(Poland) Tomasz Kulawik	(Poland) Radosław Sobolewski	adidas	Tele-Fonika Kable
Zagłębie Lubin	(Czech Republic) Pavel Hapal	(Poland) Adam Banaś	Nike	KGHM

1. On the back of shirt.
2. Lech Poznań makes a donation to wygrajzycie.pl (it's a charity website) in order to display the charity's logo on the club's kit.
3 On the left sleeve.

Puma is the official ball supplier for Ekstraklasa.

=== Managerial changes ===
Team	Outgoing manager	Manner of departure	Date of vacancy	Position in table	Incoming manager	Date of appointment
Polonia Warsaw	(Poland) Czesław Michniewicz	Mutual consent	23 July	Pre-season	(Poland) Piotr Stokowiec	Pre-season
Śląsk Wrocław	(Poland) Orest Lenczyk	Mutual consent	31 August 2012	9th	(Poland) Paweł Barylski (caretaker)	31 August 2012
Śląsk Wrocław	(Poland) Paweł Barylski (caretaker)	Caretaking spell over	3 September 2012	5th	(Czech Republic) Stanislav Levý	3 September 2012
Ruch Chorzów	(Poland) Tomasz Fornalik	Mutual consent	5 September 2012	15th	(Poland) Jacek Zieliński	5 September 2012
GKS Bełchatów	(Poland) Kamil Kiereś	Mutual consent	25 September 2012	16th	(Poland) Jan Złomańczuk	25 September 2012
Wisła Kraków	(Poland) Michał Probierz	Resignation	3 October 2012	11th	(Poland) Tomasz Kulawik	3 October 2012
Podbeskidzie Bielsko-Biała	(Poland) Robert Kasperczyk	Mutual consent	22 October 2012	16th	(Poland) Andrzej Wyroba (caretaker)	22 October 2012
Podbeskidzie Bielsko-Biała	(Poland) Andrzej Wyroba (caretaker)	Caretaking spell over	29 October 2012	16th	(Poland) Marcin Sasal	29 October 2012
GKS Bełchatów	(Poland) Jan Złomańczuk	Mutual consent	14 August 2012	16th	(Poland) Michał Probierz	14 August 2012
Podbeskidzie Bielsko-Biała	(Poland) Marcin Sasal	Sacked	3 January 2013	16th	(Poland) Dariusz Kubicki	4 January 2013
GKS Bełchatów	(Poland) Michał Probierz	Resignation	21 December 2012	15th	(Poland) Kamil Kiereś	9 January 2013
Pogoń Szczecin	(Poland) Artur Skowronek	Sacked	19 March 2013	13th	(Poland) Dariusz Wdowczyk	20 March 2013
Podbeskidzie Bielsko-Biała	(Poland) Dariusz Kubicki	Resigned	20 March 2013	15th	(Poland) Czesław Michniewicz	22 March 2013

== League table ==
Pos	Team	Pld	W	D	L	GF	GA	GD	Pts	Qualification or relegation
1	Legia Warsaw (C)	30	20	7	3	59	22	+37	67	Qualification to Champions League second qualifying round
2	Lech Poznań	30	19	4	7	46	22	+24	61	Qualification to Europa League second qualifying round
3	Śląsk Wrocław	30	13	8	9	44	42	+2	47	Qualification to Europa League second qualifying round
4	Piast Gliwice (Note: Since both finalists of 2012–13 Polish Cup, Legia Warsaw and Śląsk Wrocław, finished top three, 4th-placed Piast Gliwice also qualified for Europa League.)	30	13	7	10	41	41	0	46	Qualification to Europa League second qualifying round
5	Górnik Zabrze	30	12	7	11	35	31	+4	43	
6	Polonia Warsaw (Note: Polonia Warszawa did not receive the license for the 2013–14 season due to financial problems. As a result, the 15th-placed Ruch Chorzów stayed in Ekstraklasa for the next season.) (D, R)	30	11	9	10	45	34	+11	42	Club dissolved after season
7	Wisła Kraków	30	10	8	12	28	35	−7	38 (Note: WIS 1–0 LGD; LGD 0–0 WIS)	
8	Lechia Gdańsk	30	10	8	12	42	43	−1	38	
9	Zagłębie Lubin (Note: Zagłębie Lubin was docked 3 points due to bribery scandal in 2005–06 season.)	30	11	7	12	38	37	+1	37 (Note: JAG 0–0 ZLU; ZLU 2–1 JAG)	
10	Jagiellonia Białystok	30	8	13	9	31	45	−14	37	
11	Korona Kielce	30	9	9	12	32	37	−5	36	
12	Pogoń Szczecin	30	10	5	15	29	39	−10	35	
13	Widzew Łódź	30	8	9	13	30	41	−11	33	
14	Podbeskidzie Bielsko-Biała	30	8	8	14	39	43	−4	32	
15	Ruch Chorzów	30	8	7	15	35	48	−13	31 (Note: RUC 2–1 GKS; GKS 0–3 RUC)	
16	GKS Bełchatów (R)	30	7	10	13	24	38	−14	31	Relegation to I liga

Source: 90minut.pl (in Polish)
Rules for classification: 1) points; 2) head-to-head points; 3) head-to-head goal difference; 4) head-to-head goals scored; 5) goal difference; 6) number of goals scored; 7) Fair Play table. Head-to-head record is used only after all the matches between the teams in question have been played
(C) Champions; (D) Disqualified; (R) Relegated

=== Positions by round ===
The following table represents the teams position after each round in the competition.

Team ╲ Round	1	2	3	4	5	6	7	8	9	10	11	12	13	14	15	16	17	18	19	20	21	22	23	24	25	26	27	28	29	30
Legia Warsaw	2	1	1	2	2	2	1	1	1	1	1	1	1	1	1	1	1	1	1	1	1	1	1	1	1	1	1	1	1	1
Lech Poznań	1	2	3	3	3	4	2	2	2	2	2	3	2	2	2	2	2	2	2	2	2	2	2	2	2	2	2	2	2	2
Śląsk Wrocław	11	9	5	5	4	7	5	5	6	5	5	6	6	5	5	4	5	5	4	5	3	3	3	4	3	5	4	3	3	3
Piast Gliwice	12	16	10	6	5	3	6	7	8	9	8	7	7	9	7	7	7	7	6	6	5	6	5	5	4	3	3	4	4	4
Górnik Zabrze	5	4	7	7	8	6	3	3	3	3	4	4	4	3	3	3	4	4	5	3	4	4	4	3	5	4	6	6	6	5
Polonia Warsaw	4	7	4	4	6	5	9	6	4	4	3	2	3	4	4	5	3	3	3	4	6	5	6	6	6	6	5	5	5	6
Wisła Kraków	8	6	9	11	9	11	13	12	13	13	12	11	9	11	12	13	12	9	9	9	10	12	11	9	9	7	7	7	7	7
Lechia Gdańsk	13	8	6	8	10	8	7	8	7	7	6	5	5	6	6	6	6	6	7	7	7	9	8	10	12	10	8	8	8	8
Zagłębie Lubin	16	12	13	15	15	15	14	15	14	15	14	14	14	13	11	10	9	8	8	8	11	8	10	8	7	8	10	10	10	9
Jagiellonia Białystok	6	5	8	9	11	10	12	11	11	10	9	10	11	10	10	11	10	11	10	10	8	7	7	7	8	9	11	11	11	10
Korona Kielce	14	14	15	13	12	13	11	13	10	12	13	13	12	12	13	12	13	13	11	11	9	10	9	11	11	12	9	9	9	11
Pogoń Szczecin	3	10	11	10	7	9	8	9	9	11	10	8	8	7	8	8	8	10	13	13	13	14	14	14	14	14	13	12	13	12
Widzew Łódź	7	3	2	1	1	1	4	4	5	6	7	9	10	8	9	9	11	12	12	12	12	11	13	13	10	11	12	13	12	13
Podbeskidzie Bielsko-Biała	10	11	12	12	14	14	15	16	16	14	15	15	16	16	16	15	15	15	15	16	15	15	15	15	15	16	16	16	15	14
Ruch Chorzów	15	15	16	14	13	12	10	10	12	8	11	12	13	14	14	14	14	14	14	14	14	13	12	12	13	13	14	14	14	15
GKS Bełchatów	9	13	14	16	16	16	16	14	15	16	16	16	15	15	15	16	16	16	16	15	16	16	16	16	16	15	15	15	16	16

Source: 90minut.pl (in Polish)

== Results ==
Home \ Away	BEŁ	GÓR	JAG	KOR	LPO	LGD	LEG	PIA	PBB	POG	PWA	RUC	ŚLĄ	WID	WIS	ZLU
GKS Bełchatów		2–0	1–1	1–1	0–1	1–1	0–2	1–3	2–1	0–1	0–5	0–3	1–0	0–0	0–0	3–2
Górnik Zabrze	2–0		1–2	2–0	0–1	2–0	2–2	1–0	0–1	0–0	0–4	2–0	4–1	3–1	0–1	0–2
Jagiellonia Białystok	2–2	1–1		0–0	0–1	0–2	0–3	0–2	2–1	1–0	2–0	1–0	0–3	2–2	2–2	0–0
Korona Kielce	1–0	1–0	5–0		0–1	0–1	3–2	4–0	2–1	2–1	1–1	2–1	1–1	0–0	1–1	1–0
Lech Poznań	0–0	0–0	0–2	2–0		4–2	1–3	4–0	0–2	1–1	0–1	4–0	0–3	4–0	1–0	3–1
Lechia Gdańsk	1–1	0–2	2–3	3–2	2–0		1–2	1–2	1–2	1–1	1–3	4–4	2–3	2–0	0–0	2–2
Legia Warsaw	0–0	3–0	1–2	4–0	1–0	1–0		3–2	3–1	3–1	1–1	3–0	5–0	1–0	2–1	2–0
Piast Gliwice	2–3	1–2	1–1	1–1	0–3	2–0	0–0		1–0	1–0	1–1	1–3	3–2	1–2	2–0	1–1
Podbeskidzie Bielsko-Biała	1–1	1–3	4–0	1–1	2–3	2–3	1–2	1–2		2–1	0–1	1–2	1–1	2–2	1–1	1–1
Pogoń Szczecin	0–1	1–0	1–1	2–1	0–2	0–2	0–3	0–2	2–0		3–1	1–0	0–3	1–1	2–0	4–0
Polonia Warsaw	0–1	1–1	1–1	2–0	1–2	1–1	1–2	1–1	2–1	2–0		2–1	2–2	3–1	1–2	0–1
Ruch Chorzów	2–1	0–0	1–1	1–1	0–4	0–1	0–0	1–2	1–3	2–3	2–1		1–1	3–0	1–2	2–1
Śląsk Wrocław	2–1	2–1	3–3	2–0	1–1	1–1	1–0	1–3	1–1	1–0	2–1	1–0		2–1	3–0	0–2
Widzew Łódź	1–0	1–1	3–0	1–0	0–1	1–2	1–1	1–1	1–2	1–3	3–2	2–0	2–1		1–2	0–0
Wisła Kraków	2–1	1–3	0–0	3–0	0–1	1–0	1–2	1–2	0–0	2–0	1–3	1–1	1–0	1–0		0–1
Zagłębie Lubin	1–0	1–2	2–1	2–1	0–1	0–3	2–2	2–1	1–2	3–0	0–0	2–3	4–0	0–1	4–1	

Source: Ekstraklasa (in Polish)
Legend: Blue = home team win; Yellow = draw; Red = away team win.

== Season statistics ==
=== Top goalscorers ===
As of matches played 2 June 2013.

Rank	Player	Club	Goals
1	(Slovakia) Róbert Demjan	Podbeskidzie	14
2	(Serbia) Danijel Ljuboja	Legia Warsaw	12
2	(Georgia (country)) Vladimir Dvalishvili	Legia Warsaw	12
4	(Poland) Bartosz Ślusarski	Lech Poznań	11
4	(Czech Republic) Michal Papadopulos	Zagłębie Lubin	11
6	(Poland) Marek Saganowski	Legia Warsaw	10
7	(Burkina Faso) Abdou Razack Traoré	Lechia Gdańsk	9
7	(Poland) Maciej Korzym	Korona Kielce	9
7	(Poland) Jakub Kosecki	Legia Warsaw	9
10	(Poland) Szymon Pawłowski	Zagłębie Lubin	8
10	(Poland) Piotr Ćwielong	Śląsk Wrocław	8
10	(Poland) Łukasz Broź	Widzew Łódź	8

=== Top assists ===
As of matches played 2 June 2013.

Rank	Player	Club	Assists
1	(Poland) Sebastian Mila	Śląsk Wrocław	13
2	(Serbia) Miroslav Radović	Legia Warsaw	11
3	(Poland) Paweł Golański	Korona Kielce	8
4	(Poland) Łukasz Teodorczyk	Lech Poznań	7
5	(Poland) Dawid Plizga	Jagiellonia	6
5	(Slovakia) Róbert Demjan	Podbeskidzie	6
5	(Poland) Marek Saganowski	Legia Warsaw	6
5	(Poland) Szymon Pawłowski	Zagłębie Lubin	6
9	(Burkina Faso) Abdou Razack Traoré	Lechia Gdańsk	5
9	(Poland) Mateusz Machaj	Lechia Gdańsk	5
9	(Poland) Paweł Wszołek	Polonia Warsaw	5
9	(Slovakia) Róbert Jež	Zagłębie Lubin	5
9	(Poland) Tomasz Brzyski	Legia Warsaw	5
9	(Poland) Paweł Wszołek	Polonia Warsaw	5
9	(Poland) Filip Starzyński	Lechia Gdańsk	5
9	(Poland) Marek Zieńczuk	Ruch Chorzów	5
9	(Poland) Waldemar Sobota	Śląsk Wrocław	5
9	(Poland) Tomasz Frankowski	Jagiellonia	5

=== Clean sheets ===
As of matches played 17 May 2013.

Rank	Player	Club	Clean sheets
1	(Bosnia and Herzegovina) Jasmin Burić	Lech Poznań	13
2	(Slovakia) Dušan Kuciak	Legia Warsaw	10
3	(Poland) Łukasz Skorupski	Górnik Zabrze	8
3	(Poland) Michał Gliwa	Zagłębie Lubin	8
3	(Lithuania) Emilijus Zubas	GKS Bełchatów	8
6	(Estonia) Sergei Pareiko	Wisła Kraków	7
6	(Poland) Dariusz Trela	Piast Gliwice	7
8	(Poland) Jakub Słowik	Jagiellonia	5
8	(Slovakia) Marián Kelemen	Śląsk Wrocław	5
8	(Poland) Michał Buchalik	Lechia Gdańsk	5

== Awards ==
=== Monthly awards ===
==== Player of the Month ====
Month	Player	Club
August 2012	(Poland) Arkadiusz Milik	Górnik Zabrze
September 2012	(Poland) Marek Saganowski	Legia Warsaw
October 2012	(Burkina Faso) Abdou Razack Traoré	Lechia Gdańsk
November 2012	(Poland) Jakub Kosecki	Legia Warsaw
March 2013	(Lithuania) Emilijus Zubas	GKS Bełchatów
April 2013	(Slovakia) Róbert Demjan	Podbeskidzie Bielsko-Biała

==== Coach of the Month ====
Month	Coach	Club
August 2012	(Poland) Radosław Mroczkowski	Widzew Łódź
September 2012	(Poland) Adam Nawałka	Górnik Zabrze
October 2012	(Poland) Adam Nawałka	Górnik Zabrze
November 2012	(Poland) Jan Urban	Legia Warsaw
March 2013	(Poland) Kamil Kiereś	GKS Bełchatów
April 2013	(Poland) Mariusz Rumak	Lech Poznań

=== Annual awards ===
Award	Player	Club
Player of the Season	(Slovakia) Róbert Demjan	Podbeskidzie Bielsko-Biała
Goalkeeper of the Season	(Lithuania) Emilijus Zubas	GKS Bełchatów
Defender of the Season	(Poland) Artur Jędrzejczyk	Legia Warsaw
Midfielder of the Season	(Poland) Sebastian Mila	Śląsk Wrocław
Forward of the Season	(Slovakia) Róbert Demjan	Podbeskidzie Bielsko-Biała
Coach of the Season	(Poland) Jan Urban	Legia Warsaw
Goal of the Season	(Poland) Przemysław Kaźmierczak	Śląsk Wrocław
Discovery of the Season	(Poland) Bartosz Bereszyński	Lech Poznań & Legia Warsaw
Fair Play Award of the Season	Górnik Zabrze	

== Attendances ==
No.	Club	Average
1	Lech Poznań	22,640
2	Legia Warszawa	17,906
3	Śląsk Wrocław	15,137
4	Wisła Kraków	13,929
5	Lechia Gdansk	13,274
6	Zagłębie Lubin	7,133
7	Korona Kielce	6,913
8	Pogoń Szczecin	6,354
9	Piast	5,839
10	Widzew Łódź	5,170
11	Ruch Chorzów	4,934
12	Polonia Warszawa	4,116
13	Jagiellonia Białystok	3,377
14	Górnik Zabrze	3,000
15	Podbeskidzie Bielsko-Biala	2,840
16	Bełchatów	1,985
