= Robert Góralczyk =

Robert Góralczyk may refer to:

- Robert Góralczyk (football manager) (born 1974), Polish football manager
- Robert Góralczyk (ice hockey) (1943–1984), Polish ice hockey player
