= Radosław Mroczkowski =

Polish football manager

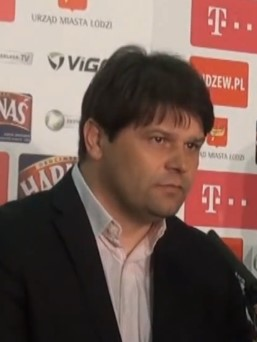

Personal information
- Full name: Radosław Mroczkowski
- Date of birth: 4 November 1967 (age 58)
- Place of birth: Poddębice, Poland

Senior career*
Years	Team	Apps	(Gls)
- Start Łódź

Managerial career
- Start Łódź (youth)
- Widzew Łódź (youth)
- Łódzki Związek Piłki Nożnej (youth)
- 2002–2006: UKS SMS Łódź
- 2006–2008: Poland U18
- 2006–2008: Poland U16
- 2008–2009: Poland U21
- 2009: Poland U23
- 2009–2010: Dolcan Ząbki
- 2010–2011: Widzew Łódź (youth)
- 2011–2013: Widzew Łódź
- 2015: Raków Częstochowa
- 2016–2017: Sandecja Nowy Sącz
- 2018–2019: Widzew Łódź
- 2019: Zagłębie Sosnowiec
- 2020–2021: Resovia
- * Club domestic league appearances and goals

Radosław Mroczkowski (born 4 November 1967) is a Polish professional football manager and former player.

== Career ==
Mroczkowski managed Widzew Łódź in the Ekstraklasa between 2011 and 2013. He joined Sandecja Nowy Sącz during the 2015–16 season, and was dismissed in December 2017.

Mroczkowski replaced Franciszek Smuda as Widzew's manager in June 2018.

== Honours ==
Sandecja Nowy Sącz

- I liga: 2016–17

Individual

- Ekstraklasa Coach of the Month: August 2011, August 2012
