= Leszek Jezierski =

Polish footballer and coach

Personal information
- Full name: Leszek Jezierski
- Date of birth: 12 May 1929
- Place of birth: Lublin, Poland
- Date of death: 12 January 2008 (aged 78)
- Place of death: Łódź, Poland
- Height: 1.68 m (5 ft 6 in)
- Position: Striker

Senior career*
Years	Team	Apps	(Gls)
1945–1950	Lublinianka Lublin		
1950–1951	CWKS Warsaw	6	(1)
1951–1961	ŁKS Łódź	?	(20)
1962–1963	Start Łódź		
1963	Włókniarz Łódź		
1963–1964	Stomil Poznań		

International career
1954–1958	Poland	6	(0)

Managerial career
- 1968: ŁKS Łódź
- 1969–1976: Widzew Łódź
- 1976–1978: ŁKS Łódź
- 1978–1980: Ruch Chorzów
- 1981–1984: ŁKS Łódź
- 1985: Lech Poznań
- 1985–1987: Pogoń Szczecin
- 1987–1990: ŁKS Łódź
- 1992: Pogoń Szczecin
- 1992: Zawisza Bydgoszcz
- 1993: Widzew Łódź
- 1995–1996: ŁKS Łódź
- 1999: Pogoń Szczecin
- * Club domestic league appearances and goals

Leszek "Napoleon" Jezierski (12 May 1929 – 12 January 2008) was a Polish footballer and manager.

== Biography ==
Born in Lublin, Jezierski played for top-tier club CWKS Warsaw. He made his debut for the Poland national team against Bulgaria in 1954, playing for his country six times. He later became a manager, helping promote Widzew Łódź in 1975 to the top-flight. After retiring, Jezierski worked as a sport commentator for print and broadcasting media. On 12 January 2008, he died aged 78 of a heart attack.

== Honours ==
=== Player ===
ŁKS Łódź

- Ekstraklasa: 1958
- Polish Cup: 1956–57

=== Manager ===
Widzew Łódź

- II liga North: 1974–75

Ruch Chorzów

- Ekstraklasa: 1978–79

Individual

- Polish Coach of the Year: 1975, 1976, 1987
