= Piłka Nożna magazine plebiscite =

Annual football award by Polish Piłka Nożna weekly

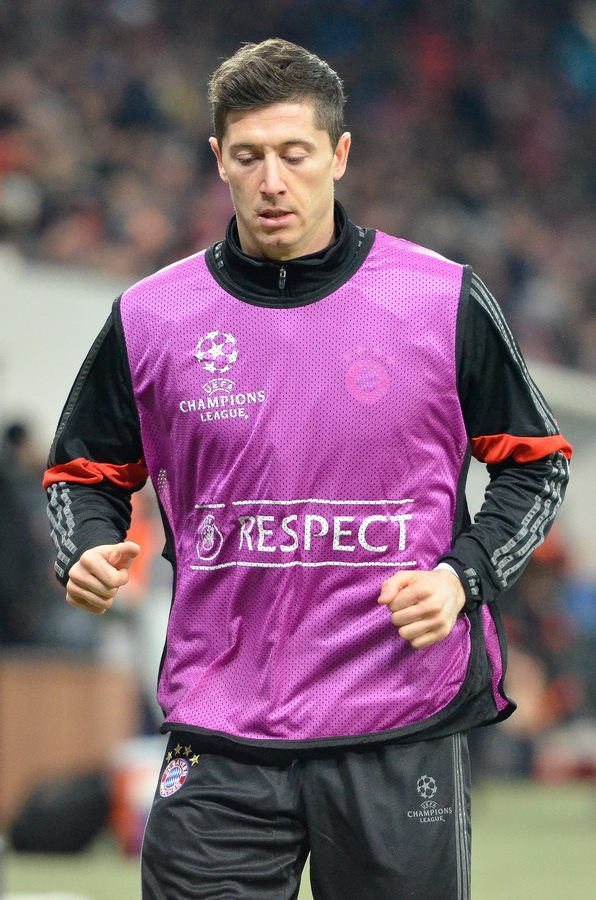
Robert Lewandowski, pictured here in 2015, is a record thirteen-time winner of the award.

The Piłka Nożna magazine plebiscite (Polish: Plebiscyt Piłki Nożnej) is an annual plebiscite organized by the journalists of Piłka Nożna (literally "Foot Ball"), the Polish football weekly. Jurors choose the best men's player, women's player, newcomer, team, coach and foreigner in Polish football, as well as the best performing top-flight and second-tier players.

The title of Polish Footballer of the Year has been awarded every year since 1973. Kazimierz Deyna, a midfielder for Legia Warsaw, was the inaugural winner of the award, and Mirosław Bulzacki was named the Newcomer of the Year. Since then, the plebiscite has been expanded to include more categories. In 2015, the women's player of the year category was introduced. As of 2026, Robert Lewandowski holds the record number of 13 wins followed by Ebi Smolarek with 3 wins. Franciszek Smuda and Paweł Janas are the joint-record winners in the Coach of the Year category with 4 wins each.

Before 1973, similar polls were conducted by Polish weekly newspaper Sport based in Katowice, but less frequently.

== Categories and winners ==
| Year | Player of the Year | Newcomer of the Year | Coach of the Year | Team of the Year | Foreigner of the Year | Ekstraklasa Player of the Year | I liga Player of the Year | Women's Player of the Year | Women's Newcomer of the Year |
|---|---|---|---|---|---|---|---|---|---|
| 1973 | Kazimierz Deyna (Legia Warsaw) | Mirosław Bulzacki (ŁKS Łódź) | – | – | – | – | – | – | – |
| 1974 | Kazimierz Deyna (Legia Warsaw) | Władysław Żmuda (Gwardia Warsaw) | – | – | – | – | – | – | – |
| 1975 | Zygmunt Maszczyk (Ruch Chorzów) | Zbigniew Hnatio (Stal Mielec) | Leszek Jezierski (Widzew Łódź) | – | – | – | – | – | – |
| 1976 | Henryk Kasperczak (Stal Mielec) | Zbigniew Boniek (Widzew Łódź); Stanisław Terlecki (ŁKS Łódź) | Leszek Jezierski (Widzew Łódź) | – | – | – | – | – | – |
| 1977 | Henryk Kasperczak (Stal Mielec) | Adam Nawałka (Wisła Kraków) | Bogusław Hajdas (Pogoń Szczecin/Gwardia Warsaw) | – | – | – | – | – | – |
| 1978 | Zbigniew Boniek (Widzew Łódź) | Włodzimierz Ciołek (Górnik Wałbrzych/Stal Mielec) | Antoni Piechniczek (Odra Opole) | – | – | – | – | – | – |
| 1979 | Wojciech Rudy (Zagłębie Sosnowiec) | Andrzej Pałasz (Górnik Zabrze) | Hubert Kostka (Szombierki Bytom) | – | – | – | – | – | – |
| 1980 | – | Piotr Skrobowski (Wisła Kraków) | Hubert Kostka (Szombierki Bytom) | – | – | – | – | – | – |
| 1981 | Grzegorz Lato (Lokeren) | Waldemar Matysik (Górnik Zabrze) | Jerzy Kopa (Pogoń Szczecin) | – | – | – | – | – | – |
| 1982 | Zbigniew Boniek (Widzew Łódź/Juventus) | Andrzej Buncol (Legia Warsaw) | Władysław Żmuda (Widzew Łódź) | – | – | – | – | – | – |
| 1983 | Józef Młynarczyk (Widzew Łódź) | Marek Leśniak (Pogoń Szczecin) | Wojciech Łazarek (Lech Poznań) | – | – | – | – | – | – |
| 1984 | Włodzimierz Smolarek (Widzew Łódź) | Jan Furtok (GKS Katowice) | Wojciech Łazarek (Lech Poznań) | – | – | – | – | – | – |
| 1985 | Dariusz Dziekanowski (Widzew Łódź/Legia Warsaw) | Andrzej Rudy (Śląsk Wrocław) | Hubert Kostka (Górnik Zabrze) | – | – | – | – | – | – |
| 1986 | Włodzimierz Smolarek (Widzew Łódź/Eintracht Frankfurt) | Marek Koniarek (GKS Katowice) | Alojzy Łysko (GKS Katowice) | – | – | – | – | – | – |
| 1987 | Andrzej Iwan (Górnik Zabrze/VfL Bochum) | Ryszard Cyroń (Górnik Zabrze) | Leszek Jezierski (Pogoń Szczecin/ŁKS Łódź) | – | – | – | – | – | – |
| 1988 | Krzysztof Warzycha (Ruch Chorzów) | Roman Kosecki (Gwardia Warsaw) | Marcin Bochynek (Górnik Zabrze) | – | – | – | – | – | – |
| 1989 | Ryszard Tarasiewicz (Śląsk Wrocław/Neuchâtel Xamax) | Dariusz Gęsior (Ruch Chorzów) | Jerzy Wyrobek (Ruch Chorzów) | – | – | – | – | – | – |
| 1990 | Jacek Ziober (ŁKS Łódź/Montpellier) | Kazimierz Sidorczuk (Lech Poznań) | Orest Lenczyk (GKS Katowice) | – | – | – | – | – | – |
| 1991 | Piotr Czachowski (Legia Warsaw/Zaglebie Lubin) | Wojciech Kowalczyk (Legia Warsaw) | Adam Musiał (Wisła Kraków) | – | – | – | – | – | – |
| 1992 | Wojciech Kowalczyk (Legia Warsaw) | Marek Koźmiński (Hutnik Kraków/Udinese) | Janusz Wójcik (Poland Olympic/Legia Warsaw) | – | – | – | – | – | – |
| 1993 | Marek Leśniak (SG Wattenscheid 09) | Radosław Michalski (Legia Warsaw) | Andrzej Zamilski (Poland men's U-16) | – | – | – | – | – | – |
| 1994 | Roman Kosecki (Atlético Madrid) | Sylwester Czereszewski (Stomil Olsztyn) | Paweł Janas (Legia Warsaw); Piotr Piekarczyk (GKS Katowice) | – | – | – | – | – | – |
| 1995 | Leszek Pisz (Legia Warsaw) | Tomasz Iwan (Roda JC/Feyenoord) | Paweł Janas (Legia Warsaw) | – | – | – | – | – | – |
| 1996 | Piotr Nowak (1860 Munich) | Marek Citko (Widzew Łódź) | Franciszek Smuda (Widzew Łódź) | – | – | – | – | – | – |
| 1997 | Sławomir Majak (Widzew Łódź/Hansa Rostock) | Tomasz Kłos (ŁKS Łódź) | Franciszek Smuda (Widzew Łódź) | – | – | – | – | – | – |
| 1998 | Mirosław Trzeciak (ŁKS Łódź/Osasuna) | Tomasz Frankowski (Martigues/Wisła Kraków) | Janusz Wójcik (Poland men's) | – | – | – | – | – | – |
| 1999 | Jacek Zieliński (Legia Warsaw) | Adam Kompała (Górnik Zabrze) | Franciszek Smuda (Wisła Kraków/Legia Warsaw) | – | – | – | – | – | – |
| 2000 | Jerzy Dudek (Feyenoord) | Michał Żewłakow (Mouscron) | Jerzy Engel (Poland men's) | – | – | – | – | – | – |
| 2001 | Emmanuel Olisadebe (Polonia Warsaw/Panathinaikos) | Tomasz Moskała (GKS Katowice/Dyskobolia Grodzisk Wielkopolski) | Jerzy Engel (Poland men's) | Poland men's | – | – | – | – | – |
| 2002 | Maciej Żurawski (Wisła Kraków) | Andrzej Niedzielan (Górnik Zabrze) | Henryk Kasperczak (Wisła Kraków) | Wisła Kraków | – | – | – | – | – |
| 2003 | Jacek Krzynówek (1. FC Nürnberg) | Marcin Nowacki (Odra Wodzisław) | Not awarded, distinction: Jacek Zieliński (Górnik Łęczna) | Dyskobolia Grodzisk Wielkopolski | (Slovakia) Dušan Radolský (Dyskobolia Grodzisk Wielkopolski) | – | – | – | – |
| 2004 | Jacek Krzynówek (1. FC Nürnberg / Bayer Leverkusen) | Artur Boruc (Legia Warsaw) | Paweł Janas (Poland men's) | Poland men's | (Croatia) Ivica Križanac (Dyskobolia Grodzisk Wielkopolski) | Tomasz Frankowski (Wisła Kraków) | – | – | – |
| 2005 | Ebi Smolarek (Borussia Dortmund) | Grzegorz Piechna (Korona Kielce) | Paweł Janas (Poland men's) | Poland men's | – | Grzegorz Piechna (Korona Kielce) | – | – | – |
| 2006 | Ebi Smolarek (Borussia Dortmund) | Radosław Matusiak (GKS Bełchatów) | Orest Lenczyk (GKS Bełchatów) | – | (Netherlands) Leo Beenhakker (Poland men's) | Piotr Reiss (Lech Poznań) | – | – | – |
| 2007 | Ebi Smolarek (Borussia Dortmund/Racing Santander) | Radosław Majewski (Dyskobolia Grodzisk Wielkopolski) | Maciej Skorża (Dyskobolia Grodzisk Wielkopolski/Wisła Kraków) | Poland men's | (Brazil) Roger Guerreiro (Legia Warsaw) | Marek Zieńczuk (Wisła Kraków) | – | – | – |
| 2008 | Jakub Błaszczykowski (Borussia Dortmund) | Robert Lewandowski (Znicz Pruszków/Lech Poznań) | Franciszek Smuda (Lech Poznań) | Lech Poznań | (Bosnia and Herzegovina) Semir Štilić (Lech Poznań) | Paweł Brożek (Wisła Kraków) | Marcin Robak (Korona Kielce/Widzew Łódź) | – | – |
| 2009 | Mariusz Lewandowski (Shakhtar Donetsk) | Patryk Małecki (Wisła Kraków) | Waldemar Fornalik (Ruch Chorzów) | Poland women's | (Slovakia) Jan Mucha (Legia Warsaw) | Robert Lewandowski (Lech Poznań) | Maciej Tataj (Dolcan Ząbki) | – | – |
| 2010 | Jakub Błaszczykowski (Borussia Dortmund) | Grzegorz Sandomierski (Jagiellonia Białystok); Maciej Jankowski (Ruch Chorzów) | Michał Probierz (Jagiellonia Białystok) | Lech Poznań | (Colombia) Manuel Arboleda (Lech Poznań) | Adrian Mierzejewski (Polonia Warsaw) | Adam Cieśliński (Podbeskidzie Bielsko-Biała) | – | – |
| 2011 | Robert Lewandowski (Borussia Dortmund) | Wojciech Szczęsny (Arsenal) | Maciej Skorża (Legia Warsaw) | Legia Warsaw | (Serbia) Miroslav Radović (Legia Warsaw) | Sebastian Mila (Śląsk Wrocław) | Adrian Błąd (Zawisza Bydgoszcz) | – | – |
| 2012 | Robert Lewandowski (Borussia Dortmund) | Arkadiusz Milik (Górnik Zabrze) | Waldemar Fornalik (Ruch Chorzów/Poland men's) | Poland men's U-17 | (Serbia) Danijel Ljuboja (Legia Warsaw) | Sebastian Mila (Śląsk Wrocław) | Maciej Kowalczyk (Kolejarz Stróże) | – | – |
| 2013 | Robert Lewandowski (Borussia Dortmund) | Dominik Furman (Legia Warsaw) | Jan Urban (Legia Warsaw) | Poland women's U-17 | (Slovakia) Dušan Kuciak (Legia Warsaw) | Radosław Sobolewski (Wisła Kraków/Górnik Zabrze) | Rafał Leszczyński (Dolcan Ząbki) | – | – |
| 2014 | Robert Lewandowski (Borussia Dortmund/Bayern Munich) | Karol Linetty (Lech Poznań) | Tadeusz Pawłowski (Śląsk Wrocław) | Legia Warsaw | (Norway) Henning Berg (Legia Warsaw) | (Serbia) Miroslav Radović (Legia Warsaw) | Grzegorz Goncerz (GKS Katowice) | – | – |
| 2015 | Robert Lewandowski (Bayern Munich) | Bartosz Kapustka (Cracovia) | Adam Nawałka (Poland men's) | Poland men's | (Czech Republic) Radoslav Látal (Piast Gliwice) | (Hungary) Nemanja Nikolić (Legia Warsaw) | Michał Nalepa (Arka Gdynia) | Katarzyna Kiedrzynek (Paris Saint-Germain) | – |
| 2016 | Robert Lewandowski (Bayern Munich) | Jan Bednarek (Górnik Łęczna/Lech Poznań) | Adam Nawałka (Poland men's) | Poland men's | (Estonia) Konstantin Vassiljev (Jagiellonia Białystok) | Michał Pazdan (Legia Warsaw) | Damian Kądzior (Wigry Suwałki) | Katarzyna Kiedrzynek (Paris Saint-Germain) | – |
| 2017 | Robert Lewandowski (Bayern Munich) | Szymon Żurkowski (Górnik Zabrze) | Adam Nawałka (Poland men's) | Poland men's | (Spain) Igor Angulo (Górnik Zabrze) | Arkadiusz Malarz (Legia Warsaw) | Paweł Zawistowski (Chojniczanka Chojnice) | Katarzyna Kiedrzynek (Paris Saint-Germain) | – |
| 2018 | Łukasz Fabiański (Swansea City/West Ham United) | Sebastian Walukiewicz (Pogoń Szczecin) | Czesław Michniewicz (Poland men's U21); Piotr Stokowiec (Lechia Gdańsk) | Poland men's U21 | (Lithuania) Arvydas Novikovas (Jagiellonia Białystok) | Artur Jędrzejczyk (Legia Warsaw) | Andrzej Niewulis (Raków Częstochowa) | Ewa Pajor (Wolfsburg) | – |
| 2019 | Robert Lewandowski (Bayern Munich) | Michał Karbownik (Legia Warsaw) | Waldemar Fornalik (Piast Gliwice) | Poland men's | (Spain) Jorge Félix (Piast Gliwice) | Janusz Gol (Cracovia) | Bartosz Nowak (Stal Mielec) | Ewa Pajor (Wolfsburg) | – |
| 2020 | Robert Lewandowski (Bayern Munich) | Jakub Moder (Lech Poznań) | Marek Papszun (Raków Częstochowa) | Raków Częstochowa | (Czech Republic) Tomas Pekhart (Legia Warsaw) | Jakub Moder (Lech Poznań) | (Slovakia) Roman Gergel (Bruk-Bet Termalica Nieciecza) | Paulina Dudek (Paris Saint-Germain) | – |
| 2021 | Robert Lewandowski (Bayern Munich) | Kacper Kozłowski (Pogoń Szczecin) | Marek Papszun (Raków Częstochowa) | Raków Częstochowa | (Germany) Kosta Runjaić (Pogoń Szczecin) | Jakub Kamiński (Lech Poznań) | Kamil Biliński (Podbeskidzie Bielsko-Biała) | Paulina Dudek (Paris Saint-Germain) | – |
| 2022 | Robert Lewandowski (Barcelona) | Nicola Zalewski (Roma) | Czesław Michniewicz (Poland men's); Marek Papszun (Raków Częstochowa) | Poland men's Lech Poznań | (Sweden) Mikael Ishak (Lech Poznań) | Kamil Grosicki (Pogoń Szczecin) | (Spain) Pirulo (ŁKS Łódź) | Ewa Pajor (Wolfsburg) | – |
| 2023 | Piotr Zieliński (Napoli) | Marcin Bułka (Nice) | Marek Papszun (Raków Częstochowa) | Raków Częstochowa | (Portugal) Josué Pesqueira (Legia Warsaw) | Kamil Grosicki (Pogoń Szczecin) | Karol Czubak (Arka Gdynia) | Ewa Pajor (Wolfsburg) | – |
| 2024 | Robert Lewandowski (Barcelona) | Kacper Urbański (Bologna) | Adrian Siemieniec (Jagiellonia Białystok) | Jagiellonia Białystok | (Spain) Jesús Imaz (Jagiellonia Białystok) | Taras Romanczuk (Jagiellonia Białystok) | (Spain) Ángel Rodado (Wisła Kraków) | Ewa Pajor (Wolfsburg/Barcelona) | – |
| 2025 | Robert Lewandowski (Barcelona) | Jan Ziółkowski (Legia Warsaw/Roma) | Adrian Siemieniec (Jagiellonia Białystok) | Lech Poznań | (Sweden) Mikael Ishak (Lech Poznań) | Bartosz Nowak (GKS Katowice) | (Spain) Ángel Rodado (Wisła Kraków) | Ewa Pajor (Barcelona) | Paulina Tomasiak (Górnik Łęczna) |

== See also ==
- Polish Sports Personality of the Year
