= Mirosław Bulzacki =

Polish footballer (born 1951)

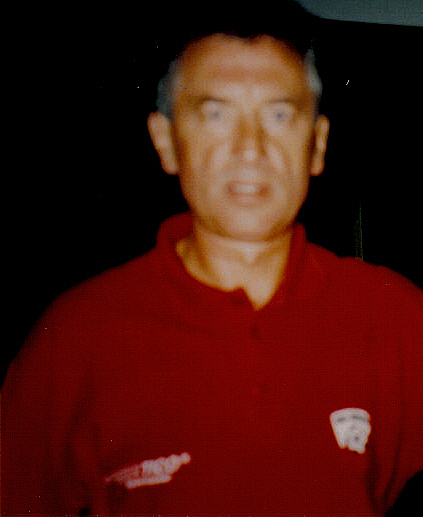
- Bulzacki in 2007

Personal information
- Full name: Mirosław Andrzej Bulzacki
- Date of birth: 23 October 1951 (age 75)
- Place of birth: Łódź, Poland
- Height: 1.84 m (6 ft 0 in)
- Position: Defender

Senior career*
Years	Team	Apps	(Gls)
1969–1983	ŁKS Łódź		
1983–1984	Start Łódź		
1984	VfL Herzlake		
1984–1986	TV Wehingen 1891		
1986–1987	Dozamet Nowa Sól		

International career
1973–1975	Poland	23	(0)
Medal record
Men's football
Representing Poland
FIFA World Cup
Third place	1974 West Germany
- * Club domestic league appearances and goals

Mirosław Andrzej Bulzacki (born 23 October 1951 in Łódź) is a Polish former professional footballer who played as a defender.

Bulzacki was a longtime player of ŁKS Łódź.

He was capped 23 times for the Poland national team and participated in the 1974 FIFA World Cup, where Poland won the bronze medal.

Bulzacki later began on a coaching career.

== Honours ==
Poland

- FIFA World Cup third place: 1974

Individual

- Polish Newcomer of the Year: 1973
