= Róbert Demjan =

Slovak footballer

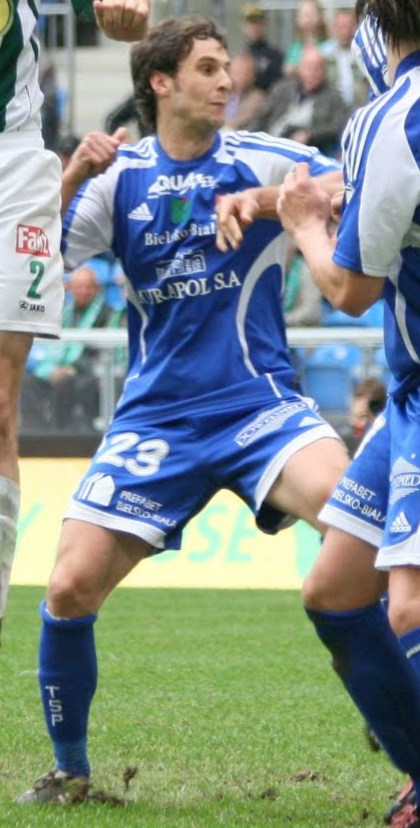
- Demjan in 2011

Personal information
- Date of birth: 26 October 1982 (age 44)
- Place of birth: Levoča, Czechoslovakia
- Height: 1.81 m (5 ft 11 in)
- Position: Forward

Team information
- Current team: TJ Vápeč Horná Poruba

Youth career
- Trebišov

Senior career*
Years	Team	Apps	(Gls)
2003	Trebišov		
2004–2006	Púchov	61	(8)
2006–2010	Žižkov	13	(1)
2010–2013	Podbeskidzie Bielsko-Biała	90	(29)
2013–2014	Waasland-Beveren	27	(2)
2014–2017	Podbeskidzie Bielsko-Biała	89	(15)
2017	Iskra Borčice	17	(15)
2018–2019	Widzew Łódź	26	(7)
2019	Fotbal Třinec	4	(0)
2019–2020	Znojmo	14	(4)
2020–2023	Považská Bystrica		
2023	LR Crystal Lednické Rovne		
2024	TJ Sokol Nevšová		
2024–	TJ Vápeč Horná Poruba		
- * Club domestic league appearances and goals as of 10:25, 26 October 2024 (UTC)

Róbert Demjan (born 26 October 1982) is a Slovak professional footballer who plays as a forward for TJ Vápeč Horná Poruba.

== Career ==
In summer 2010, Demjan joined Polish club Podbeskidzie Bielsko-Biała on a one-and-a-half-year contract.

On 1 August 2011, he scored Podbeskidzie's historic first goal in the Ekstraklasa.

He became the top scorer of the 2012–13 Ekstraklasa season, with 14 goals, contributing to Podbeskidzie's survival in the top flight. He was also chosen as the best player of the season.

== Honours ==
Widzew Łódź

- III liga, group I: 2017–18

Individual

- Ekstraklasa top scorer: 2012–13
- Ekstraklasa Player of the Season: 2012–13
- Ekstraklasa Forward of the Season: 2012–13
- Ekstraklasa Player of the Month: April 2013
