= Zdzisław Ulatowski =

Polish footballer

Personal information
- Date of birth: 20 June 1948 (age 78)
- Place of birth: Łódź, Poland
- Height: 1.69 m (5 ft 7 in)
- Position: Midfielder

Senior career*
| Years | Team | Apps | (Gls) |
| 1967–1969 | ŁKS Łódź | 2+ | (0) |

Managerial career
- Warta Sieradz
- ŁKS Łódź (youth coach)
- 1990–1991: ŁKS Łódź
- * Club domestic league appearances and goals

Zdzisław Ulatowski (born 20 June 1948) is a Polish former football manager and player who played as a midfielder. He is the father of Rafał Ulatowski.

After being a player and manager at his hometown club ŁKS, his most notable success is leading the fourth-tier Warta Sieradz into the quarter-finals of the 1978 Polish Cup, after beating the then star-filled Śląsk Wrocław in the previous round on 4 November 1978 in front of a club attendance record of 6,000 people, winning 2–1 after an additional time winning goal. They lost the quarter-finals 1–2 to Ekstraklasa team Arka Gdynia, although a controversial handball was not given and Warta fans felt they should have had a penalty. The attendance record was broken once more as 9,000 people watched the match, a record which stands to this day.
