= Andrzej Pyrdoł =

Polish football manager

Personal information
- Date of birth: 25 December 1945 (age 80)
- Place of birth: Sieradz, Poland
- Height: 1.70 m (5 ft 7 in)
- Position: Midfielder

Senior career*
Years	Team	Apps	(Gls)
- Warta Sieradz
- ŁKS Łódź
- Widzew Łódź

Managerial career
- 1989–1991: ŁKS Łódź (assistant)
- 1991–1992: ŁKS Łódź
- 1992–1995: ŁKS Łódź (assistant)
- 1995: ŁKS Łódź
- 1995–1998: Widzew Łódź (assistant)
- 1998: Widzew Łódź
- 1998–1999: Widzew Łódź (assistant)
- 2000: Widzew Łódź (caretaker)
- 2002–2008: Stal Głowno (president)
- 2003: Stal Głowno (caretaker)
- 2008–2010: ŁKS Łódź II
- 2010–2011: ŁKS Łódź
- 2012: ŁKS Łódź
- * Club domestic league appearances and goals

Andrzej Pyrdoł (born 25 December 1945) is a Polish former professional football manager and player.

== Honours ==
=== Player ===
Widzew Łódź

- II liga North: 1974–75

=== Manager ===
ŁKS Łódź

- I liga: 2010–11
