= Kamil Kiereś =

Polish football manager

Personal information
- Full name: Kamil Kiereś
- Date of birth: 16 July 1974 (age 52)
- Place of birth: Piotrków Trybunalski, Poland

Managerial career
- Years: Team
- 2002–2008: GKS Bełchatów (youth)
- 2011–2012: GKS Bełchatów
- 2013–2015: GKS Bełchatów
- 2015: GKS Bełchatów
- 2015–2016: GKS Tychy
- 2017–2018: Stomil Olsztyn
- 2019–2022: Górnik Łęczna
- 2023–2024: Stal Mielec

Kamil Kiereś (born 16 July 1974) is a Polish professional football manager who most recently managed Ekstraklasa club Stal Mielec.

== Managerial statistics ==
As of match played 30 August 2024

Managerial record by team and tenure
Team	From	To	Record							
Team	From	To	G	W	D	L	GF	GA	GD	Win %
GKS Bełchatów	1 September 2011	25 September 2012	30	6	10	14	27	37	−10	20.00
GKS Bełchatów	9 January 2013	23 March 2015	78	34	22	22	88	77	+11	43.59
GKS Bełchatów	21 May 2015	22 June 2015	4	1	1	2	7	9	−2	25.00
GKS Tychy	26 June 2015	30 October 2016	51	20	13	18	59	55	+4	39.22
Stomil Olsztyn	21 December 2017	18 October 2018	30	10	4	16	30	35	−5	33.33
Górnik Łęczna	23 May 2019	4 April 2022	107	47	29	31	146	134	+12	43.93
Stal Mielec	20 March 2023	30 August 2024	53	17	15	21	62	71	−9	32.08
Total			353	135	94	124	419	418	+1	38.24

== Honours ==
GKS Bełchatów

- I liga: 2013–14

Górnik Łęczna

- II liga: 2019–20

Individual

- Ekstraklasa Coach of the Month: March 2013, December 2021
