= Rafał Ulatowski =

Polish footballer and manager

Personal information
- Full name: Rafał Ulatowski
- Date of birth: 26 January 1973 (age 53)
- Place of birth: Łódź, Poland
- Height: 1.74 m (5 ft 8 1/2 in)
- Position: Midfielder

Youth career
- 1984–1991: ŁKS Łódź

Senior career*
Years	Team	Apps	(Gls)
1991–1992	ŁKS Łódź		
1992–1994	Bałtyk Gdynia		
2000	Leiknir Fáskrúðsfirði		
2001–2003	Knattspyrnufélagið Þróttur		

Managerial career
- 1996–1999: ŁKS Łódź (youth)
- 2000: Leiknir Fáskrúðsfirði
- 2001–2004: Knattspyrnufélagið Þróttur
- 2007–2008: Zagłębie Lubin
- 2009–2010: GKS Bełchatów
- 2010: Cracovia
- 2011: Lechia Gdańsk
- 2013: Miedź Legnica
- 2015–2016: GKS Bełchatów
- 2018: Lech Poznań (caretaker)
- 2018: Lech Poznań II (caretaker)
- 2018: Lech Poznań II (caretaker)
- 2019–2020: Lech Poznań II
- 2023–2024: Resovia
- * Club domestic league appearances and goals

Rafał Ulatowski (born 26 January 1973) is a Polish professional football manager and executive who was most recently the sporting director of Ekstraklasa club Zagłębie Lubin.

Previously a professional player as a midfielder, he has also worked as a sports commentator. His father Zdzisław was also a player and manager.

== Managerial career ==
In October 2006, he became assistant coach at Zagłębie Lubin under Czesław Michniewicz, after spending the previous two years at Lech Poznań working with Michniewicz in the same capacity. The club won the league title in the 2006–07 season. In October 2007, the club appointed Ulatowski as head coach. Zagłębie finished the 2007–08 season in fifth place but was relegated one division after past corruption was uncovered.

In July 2008, Ulatowski left Zagłębie to join the Poland national team's coaching staff as an assistant under Leo Beenhakker. He continued working with Poland in a reduced capacity until Beenhakker was sacked in September 2009. In January 2009, he was named manager of GKS Bełchatów after the resignation of Paweł Janas and continued with the club until the end of 2009–10 season, finishing fifth in the league.

A few days after his departure from Bełchatów, he was signed by Cracovia, taking the club's hot seat after Orest Lenczyk. The first months with the new team were far from successful, as Cracovia earned only four points in nine games and occupied the last position in the league's table. On 27 October 2010, Ulatowski was relieved of his duties.

On 9 November 2011, he signed a contract with Lechia Gdańsk. He had further unsuccessful spells with Miedź Legnica and a second spell with GKS Bełchatów which saw the club relegated.

In 2016, he returned to Lech Poznań, where he worked with the youth and reserve system, mainly as the head of youth development, and managed Lech's reserve team on several occasions. He left the club in May 2023.

On 5 December 2023, he resumed his managerial career, agreeing to manage I liga club Resovia, who at the time of his appointment were placed in the relegation zone, four points away from safety. Despite winning on the last matchday, Resovia finished the 2023–24 season in 16th and were relegated to the third division. He left the club by mutual consent on 19 June 2024.

On 9 June 2025, Ulatowski returned to Zagłębie Lubin after 17 years, after being appointed as their new sporting director. He left Zagłębie on 2 September 2026.

== Managerial statistics ==
As of match played 26 May 2024

Managerial record by team and tenure
Team	From	To	Record							
Team	From	To	G	W	D	L	GF	GA	GD	Win %
Zagłębie Lubin	22 October 2007	11 July 2008	28	15	7	6	47	28	+19	53.57
GKS Bełchatów	8 January 2009	21 May 2010	48	21	13	14	59	44	+15	43.75
Cracovia	28 May 2010	27 October 2010	12	2	1	9	11	25	−14	16.67
Lechia Gdańsk	9 November 2011	14 December 2011	4	1	0	3	2	7	−5	25.00
Miedź Legnica	12 June 2013	9 September 2013	9	2	3	4	12	9	+3	22.22
GKS Bełchatów	24 June 2015	30 May 2016	35	10	8	17	32	41	−9	28.57
Lech Poznań (caretaker)	10 May 2018	20 May 2018	2	0	1	1	1	4	−3	0.00
Lech Poznań II (caretaker)	27 May 2018	3 June 2018	2	2	0	0	5	0	+5	100.00
Lech Poznań II (caretaker)	5 November 2018	25 November 2018	3	2	1	0	9	1	+8	66.67
Lech Poznań II	2 April 2019	31 December 2020	66	25	16	25	108	98	+10	37.88
Resovia	4 December 2023	19 June 2024	18	5	5	8	24	30	−6	27.78
Total			227	85	55	87	310	287	+23	37.44

== Honours ==
Lech Poznań II

- III liga, group II: 2018–19
