= Andrzej Kretek =

Polish footballer and manager

Personal information
- Date of birth: 27 May 1963 (age 63)
- Place of birth: Pabianice, Poland
- Height: 1.85 m (6 ft 1 in)
- Position: Goalkeeper

Senior career*
Years	Team	Apps	(Gls)
1982–1984	Włókniarz Pabianice		
1984–1986	Śląsk Wrocław	0	(0)
1986–1988	Piast Nowa Ruda		
1988–1989	GKS Jastrzębie	19	(0)
1989–1994	Widzew Łódź	21	(0)
1994	WKS Wieluń		
1995–1998	Raków Częstochowa	35	(0)
1998	GKS Bełchatów	1	(0)
1999–2001	RKS Radomsko		

Managerial career
- 2002–2003: RKS Radomsko
- 2003: Widzew Łódź
- 2003–2004: Stal Głowno
- 2006–2007: KKS Koluszki
- 2007–2008: Włókniarz Konstantynów Łódzki
- 2008–2009: GKS Bełchatów (ME)
- 2010: Widzew Łódź
- 2011–2012: Widzew Łódź (ME)
- 2014: ŁKS Łódź
- * Club domestic league appearances and goals

Andrzej Kretek (born 27 May 1963) is a Polish professional football manager and former player who played as a goalkeeper.
