= Janusz Wójcik =

Polish politician, footballer, and coach

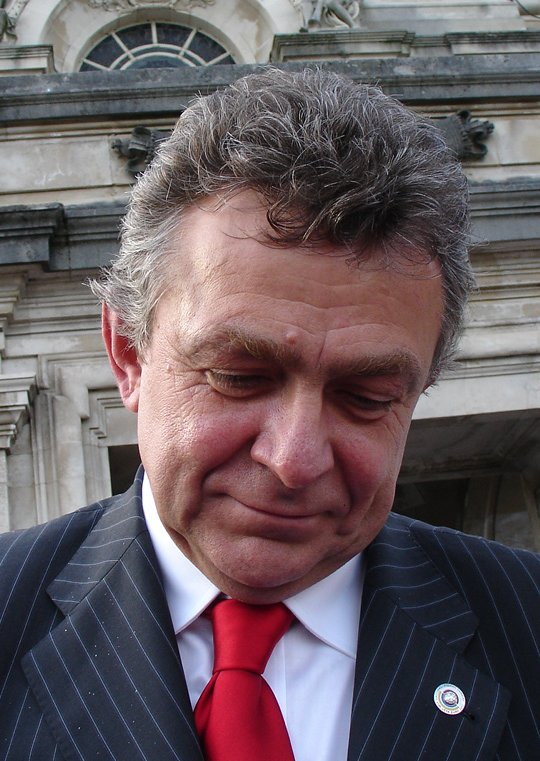

Member of Sejm
- In office 25 September 2005 – 7 September 2007

Personal details
- Born: 18 November 1953 Warsaw, Poland
- Died: 20 November 2017 (aged 64) Warsaw, Poland
- Party: Samoobrona
Association football career
- Position: Defender
Youth career
- 1968–1970: Agrykola Warsaw
- 1970–1972: Gwardia Warsaw
Senior career*
Years	Team	Apps	(Gls)
1972–1974	Gwardia Warsaw	1	(0)
1974	Ursus Warsaw		
1975–1976	Hutnik Warsaw		
1976–1977	Rawalpindi		
1979–1980	Toronto Falcons		
Managerial career
- 1978: Hutnik Warsaw
- 1981–1982: Pogoń Grodzisk Mazowiecki
- 1983–1984: Huragan Wołomin
- 1983–1984: Poland U16
- 1984–1985: Hutnik Kraków
- 1986–1987: Jagiellonia Białystok
- 1988: Poland U18
- 1989–1992: Poland U21
- 1992: Poland Olympic
- 1992–1994: Legia Warsaw
- 1994–1996: United Arab Emirates U23
- 1996: Khor Fakkan
- 1996–1997: Al-Khaleej
- 1997–1999: Poland
- 2000: Pogoń Szczecin
- 2001: Śląsk Wrocław
- 2001: Anorthosis Famagusta
- 2003: Syria
- 2004: Świt Nowy Dwór Mazowiecki
- 2007: Znicz Pruszków
- 2008: Widzew Łódź
- 2010: Al-Nahda
Medal record
Men's football
Representing Poland (as manager)
Summer Olympics
Silver medal – second place	1992 Barcelona	Team
- * Club domestic league appearances and goals

Janusz Marek Wójcik (18 November 1953 – 20 November 2017) was a Polish politician, football player and manager.

== Playing career ==
He played in several clubs at home and abroad, including Agrykola, Gwardia, Ursus and Hutnik Warsaw, Ravalpandi in Pakistan and the Toronto Falcons in Canada.

== Coaching career ==
Wójcik also trained several Polish clubs like Hutnik Kraków, Jagiellonia Białystok, Legia Warsaw, Pogoń Szczecin and Świt Nowy Dwór Mazowiecki as well as the Polish Olympic team which won the silver medal in the 1992 Summer Olympics, the senior national team, and the numerous youth national teams of Poland.

He worked as a manager also out of his country like Al-Khaleej, Anorthosis Famagusta and the Syria national team.

On 21 April 2008, he was appointed Widzew Lodz manager.

In 2010, Wójcik was hired as manager for Omani club Al-Nahda.

== Political career ==
He was a member of the Self-Defense of the Republic of Poland party and was elected to Sejm (the lower chamber of the Polish parliament) on 25 September 2005 getting 4236 votes in 24 Białystok district.

== Personal life ==
He graduated from the Warsaw Academy of Physical Education in 1979. After suffering an epileptic attack that lead to a severe head injury, he died on 20 November 2017 in hospital after surgery, without waking up from a pharmacological coma. On 29 November 2017, after the funeral mass in the Warsaw church of St. Dominik, was buried in the Służew New Cemetery.

== Honours ==
=== Manager ===
Jagiellonia Białystok

- II liga, group II: 1986–87

Poland Olympic

- Olympic silver medal: 1992

Individual

- Polish Coach of the Year: 1992, 1998
