= Yuriy Shatalov =

Russian football manager (born 1963)

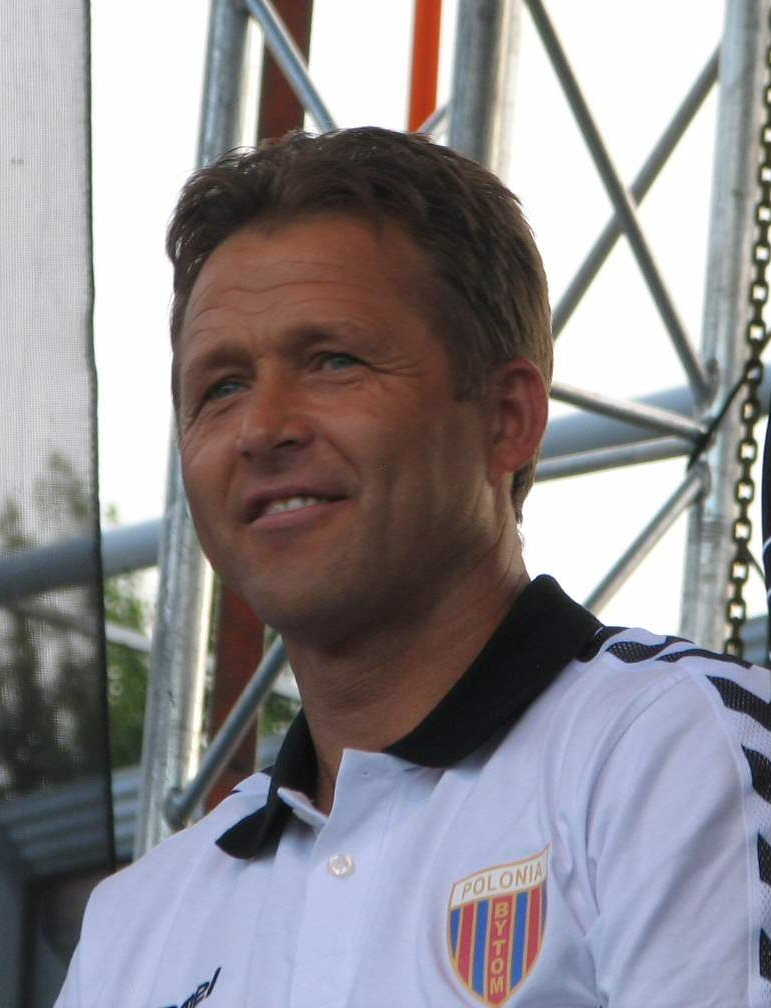
- Shatalov with Polonia Bytom in 2009

Personal information
- Full name: Yuriy Shatalov
- Date of birth: 15 September 1963 (age 63)
- Place of birth: Tetyukhe, Primorsky Krai, Soviet Union
- Height: 1.77 m (5 ft 10 in)
- Position: Defender

Team information
- Current team: Górnik Łęczna (manager)

Youth career
- Shakhtar Donetsk

Senior career*
| Years | Team | Apps | (Gls) |
| –1987 | Shakhtar Donetsk | 0 | (0) |
| 1987 | Novator Zdanov | 3 | (1) |
| 1988 | Shakhtar Horlivka | 31 | (2) |
| 1989 | Podillya Khmelnytskyi | 6 | (0) |
| 1989–1990 | Kryvbas Kryvyi Rih | 36 | (3) |
| 1991 | Pārdaugava Rīga | 22 | (0) |
| 1991–1992 | APK Azov | 39 | (4) |
| 1992–1993 | Warta Poznań | | |
| 1993–1999 | Amica Wronki | 46 | (1) |
| 2002–2003 | Sparta Oborniki | | |

Managerial career
- 1998–2002: Amica Wronki II
- 2002–2003: Sparta Oborniki (player-manager)
- 2004–2006: Kania Gostyń
- 2006: Jagiellonia Białystok
- 2006–2008: Promień Opalenica
- 2009–2010: Polonia Bytom
- 2010–2011: Cracovia
- 2012–2013: Zawisza Bydgoszcz
- 2013–2016: Górnik Łęczna
- 2016–2017: GKS Tychy
- 2026–: Górnik Łęczna
- * Club domestic league appearances and goals

Yuriy Shatalov (Polish: Jurij Szatałow; born 15 September 1963) is a Russian former professional football manager and player. He is currently the manager of Polish club Górnik Łęczna.

He is a Polish citizen, and has previously held Ukrainian citizenship.

== Career ==
He played for several clubs in Europe, including Pārdaugava Rīga in the Soviet First League and Amica Wronki the Polish Ekstraklasa.

== Managerial statistics ==
As of match played 14 November 2026

Managerial record by team and tenure
| Team | From | To | Record | | | | | | | |
| Team | From | To | G | W | D | L | GF | GA | GD | Win % |
|---|---|---|---|---|---|---|---|---|---|---|
| Sparta Oborniki | July 2002 | June 2003 | 31 | 17 | 9 | 5 | 50 | 24 | +26 | 54.84 |
| Kania Gostyń | July 2004 | 25 April 2006 | 59 | 40 | 12 | 7 | 133 | 39 | +94 | 67.80 |
| Jagiellonia Białystok | 25 April 2006 | 30 June 2006 | 12 | 6 | 2 | 4 | 13 | 10 | +3 | 50.00 |
| Promień Opalenica | 29 September 2006 | 16 March 2009 | 85 | 56 | 18 | 11 | 246 | 80 | +166 | 65.88 |
| Polonia Bytom | 16 March 2009 | 29 October 2010 | 52 | 15 | 15 | 22 | 47 | 62 | −15 | 28.85 |
| Cracovia | 31 October 2010 | 22 September 2011 | 27 | 8 | 6 | 13 | 36 | 36 | +0 | 29.63 |
| Zawisza Bydgoszcz | 19 April 2012 | 26 April 2013 | 34 | 17 | 9 | 8 | 61 | 29 | +32 | 50.00 |
| Górnik Łęczna | 1 July 2013 | 6 May 2016 | 108 | 37 | 29 | 42 | 118 | 127 | −9 | 34.26 |
| GKS Tychy | 31 October 2016 | 10 October 2017 | 34 | 13 | 5 | 16 | 48 | 50 | −2 | 38.24 |
| Górnik Łęczna | 2 January 2026 | Present | 33 | 15 | 7 | 11 | 55 | 42 | +13 | 45.45 |
| Total | | | 475 | 224 | 112 | 139 | 807 | 499 | +308 | 47.16 |

== Honours ==
=== Player ===
Amica Wronki

- Polish Cup: 1997–98

=== Managerial ===
Amica Wronki II

- III liga, group II: 2001–02
- Polish Cup (Greater Poland regionals): 1998–99, 1999–2000
- Polish Cup (Poznań regionals): 2001–02

Kania Gostyń

- IV liga Greater Poland (South): 2004–05
- Polish Cup (Leszno regionals): 2004–05

Promień Opalenica

- Polish Cup (Poznań regionals): 2007–08
