= Marcin Sasal =

Polish footballer and manager

Personal information
- Full name: Marcin Sasal
- Date of birth: 22 December 1970 (age 55)
- Place of birth: Skarżysko-Kamienna, Poland
- Position: Goalkeeper

Senior career*
| Years | Team | Apps | (Gls) |
- Szydłowianka Szydłowiec
- AZS AWF Warsaw
- Legionovia Legionowo

Managerial career
- 1993–1995: Lotto Warsaw
- 1995–2000: Drukarz Warsaw
- 2001–2005: Mazovia Youth Team
- 2005: UKS Rembertów
- 2005: GLKS Nadarzyn
- 2005–2006: Mazur Karczew
- 2006–2007: Mazowsze Grójec
- 2008–2009: Dolcan Ząbki
- 2009–2011: Korona Kielce
- 2011–2012: Pogoń Szczecin
- 2012–2013: Podbeskidzie Bielsko-Biała
- 2013: Poland U18
- 2013: Poland U19
- 2014: Dolcan Ząbki
- 2015–2016: Pogoń Siedlce
- 2017–2018: Motor Lublin
- 2019: Legionovia Legionowo
- 2019–2020: KSZO Ostrowiec
- 2021–2023: Mazovia Miński Mazowiecki
- 2023–2025: Pogoń Grodzisk Mazowiecki
- 2025–2026: ŁKS Łomża
- 2026: Świt Szczecin
- * Club domestic league appearances and goals

Marcin Sasal (Polish pronunciation: [ˈmar.t͡ɕin ˈsa.sal]; born 22 December 1970) is a Polish professional football manager and former player who was most recently in charge of II liga club Świt Szczecin.

== Managerial statistics ==
As of match played 9 August 2026

Managerial record by team and tenure
| Team | From | To | Record | | | | | | | |
| Team | From | To | G | W | D | L | GF | GA | GD | Win % |
|---|---|---|---|---|---|---|---|---|---|---|
| GLKS Nadarzyn | 1 July 2005 | 5 December 2005 | 18 | 9 | 6 | 3 | 45 | 24 | +21 | 50.00 |
| Mazur Karczew | 14 December 2005 | 23 October 2006 | 33 | 17 | 7 | 9 | 50 | 34 | +16 | 51.52 |
| Mazowsze Grójec | 15 November 2006 | 27 December 2007 | 31 | 12 | 8 | 11 | 44 | 42 | +2 | 38.71 |
| Dolcan Ząbki | 1 January 2008 | 23 November 2009 | 71 | 32 | 20 | 19 | 99 | 68 | +31 | 45.07 |
| Korona Kielce | 23 November 2009 | 12 May 2011 | 46 | 16 | 13 | 17 | 52 | 59 | −7 | 34.78 |
| Pogoń Szczecin | 1 July 2011 | 10 April 2012 | 25 | 13 | 5 | 7 | 41 | 23 | +18 | 52.00 |
| Podbeskidzie | 29 October 2012 | 3 January 2013 | 6 | 1 | 1 | 4 | 6 | 10 | −4 | 16.67 |
| Poland U18 | 16 January 2013 | 22 October 2013 | 8 | 6 | 1 | 1 | 19 | 5 | +14 | 75.00 |
| Poland U19 | 16 January 2013 | 22 October 2013 | 14 | 2 | 5 | 7 | 12 | 17 | −5 | 14.29 |
| Dolcan Ząbki | 23 June 2014 | 17 December 2014 | 20 | 5 | 11 | 4 | 24 | 24 | +0 | 25.00 |
| Pogoń Siedlce | 1 July 2015 | 30 May 2016 | 35 | 11 | 8 | 16 | 32 | 50 | −18 | 31.43 |
| Motor Lublin | 4 January 2017 | 16 April 2018 | 43 | 30 | 5 | 8 | 98 | 42 | +56 | 69.77 |
| Legionovia Legionowo | 1 January 2019 | 16 September 2019 | 29 | 18 | 1 | 10 | 63 | 40 | +23 | 62.07 |
| KSZO Ostrowiec | 21 December 2019 | 7 September 2020 | 12 | 7 | 0 | 5 | 23 | 20 | +3 | 58.33 |
| Mazovia Miński Mazowiecki | 20 October 2021 | 30 June 2023 | 61 | 44 | 5 | 12 | 158 | 70 | +88 | 72.13 |
| Pogoń Grodzisk Mazowiecki | 1 July 2023 | 2 June 2025 | 73 | 48 | 13 | 12 | 180 | 73 | +107 | 65.75 |
| ŁKS Łomża | 1 July 2025 | 1 April 2026 | 26 | 16 | 4 | 6 | 61 | 28 | +33 | 61.54 |
| Świt Szczecin | 21 April 2026 | 13 August 2026 | 10 | 1 | 1 | 8 | 11 | 27 | −16 | 10.00 |
| Total | | | 561 | 288 | 114 | 159 | 1,018 | 656 | +362 | 51.34 |

== Honours ==
Dolcan Ząbki

- III liga, group I: 2007–08

Motor Lublin

- Polish Cup (Lublin subdistrict regionals): 2016–17

Legionovia Legionowo

- III liga, group I: 2018–19

KSZO Ostrowiec

- Polish Cup (Świętokrzyskie regionals): 2019–20

Mazovia Mińsk Mazowiecki

- Polish Cup (Siedlce regionals): 2021–22

Pogoń Grodzisk Mazowiecki

- III liga, group I: 2023–24
- Polish Cup (Masovia regionals): 2023–24
