= Adam Nawałka =

Polish football manager (born 1957)

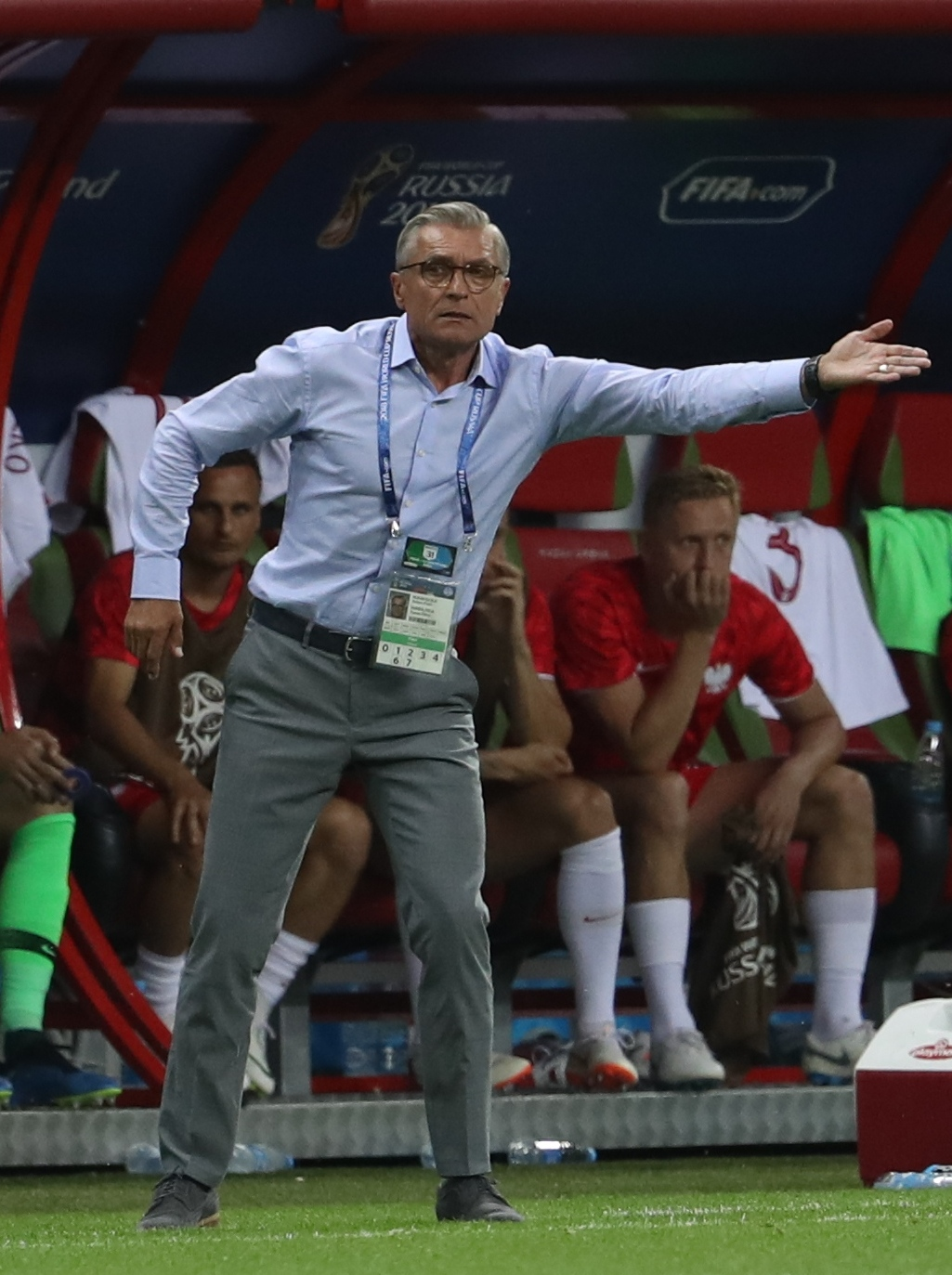
- Nawałka as Poland manager at the 2018 FIFA World Cup

Personal information
- Date of birth: 23 October 1957 (age 69)
- Place of birth: Kraków, Poland
- Height: 1.81 m (5 ft 11 in)
- Position: Midfielder

Youth career
- 1970–1975: Wisła Kraków

Senior career*
| Years | Team | Apps | (Gls) |
| 1975–1985 | Wisła Kraków | 190 | (9) |
| 1985–1988 | Polish-American Eagles | | |

International career
| 1977–1980 | Poland | 34 | (1) |

Managerial career
- 1996–1998: Świt Krzeszowice
- 2000: Wisła Kraków
- 2001: Wisła Kraków
- 2002: Zagłębie Lubin
- 2003–2004: Sandecja Nowy Sącz
- 2004–2006: Jagiellonia Białystok
- 2006–2007: Wisła Kraków
- 2007–2008: Poland (assistant)
- 2008–2009: GKS Katowice
- 2010–2013: Górnik Zabrze
- 2013–2018: Poland
- 2018–2019: Lech Poznań
- * Club domestic league appearances and goals

Adam Nawałka ([ˈadam naˈvawka]; born 23 October 1957) is a Polish professional football manager and former player. From 2013 to 2018, he was the head coach of the Poland national team.

== Club career ==
Nawałka comes from a footballing family. His father, Adam, played for the local team Orlęta Rudawa. Nawałka began his career in 1969 with Wisła Kraków, and made his top-tier debut on 21 May 1975. He played 190 matches in the highest class of Polish association football, scoring 9 goals. He played most of his career for The White Star. He started having recurrent injuries in the fall of 1978, and despite repeated surgeries, he had to retire from professional soccer in 1984. In 1985, he emigrated to the United States where he played semi-professional soccer with Polish-American Eagles, alongside performing manual labor jobs (like trimming trees around high-voltage power lines). In 1990, he returned to Poland and started selling Trabant cars with Volkswagen engines until he received his coaching qualifications in 1995.

== International career ==
He played for the Poland national team (34 matches) and was a participant at the 1978 FIFA World Cup. At the age of 20, he played 90 minutes of every game (except one) that the Polish team played. In the fall of 1978, Nawalka started having recurrent injuries that shortly eliminated him from the national team and shortened his playing career.

== Managerial career ==
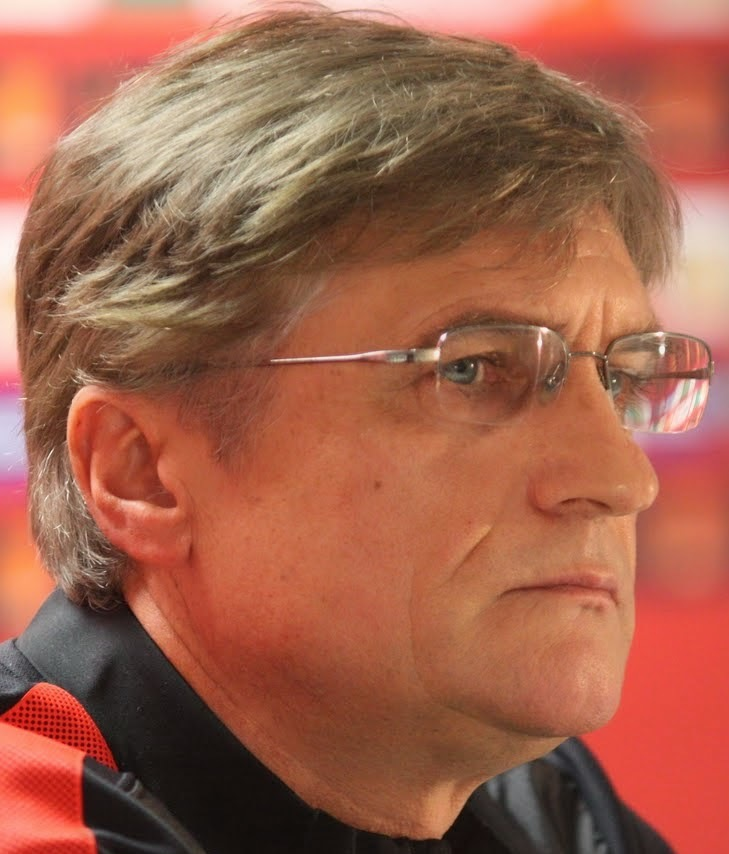
Adam Nawałka during a press conference in 2013

After receiving his coaching qualifications he coached the Polish third-tier team Świt Krzeszowice, after which he held numerous positions at his home club of Wisła Kraków, including head of scouting and sporting director, as well as being interim head coach a few times. He went on to manage GKS Katowice and later Górnik Zabrze. He was an assistant coach of the Poland national team and the understudy to Leo Beenhakker in 2007 and 2008.

On 26 October 2013, the Polish FA president Zbigniew Boniek announced that Nawałka would replace Waldemar Fornalik as the new manager of the Poland national team. At the time of the appointment, his side Górnik Zabrze was leading the league table. He remained in Zabrze until 1 November, and focused on the national team after the game against Cracovia. On 11 October 2014, he recorded an upset by defeating Germany 2–0 in their home Euro 2016 qualifier. He became the first Polish manager to successfully guide Poland into the UEFA European Championship, and also took Poland to their first Euro quarterfinals, which contributed to Poland's historic success in their football history since the fall of communist rule.

During the 2018 World Cup qualifying campaign, Poland performed extremely well, winning eight, drawing one and losing only one match, helping the Poles top the group and qualify automatically for the 2018 FIFA World Cup. However, much like in the 2002 and 2006 editions of the World Cup, Nawałka's Poland finished bottom of Group H after losing consecutive games against Senegal and Colombia. With their exit from the tournament sealed after the opening two games, Poland rounded off the group with a 1–0 victory over Japan, thus leaving the tournament with just one win. Shortly after the tournament, Nawałka and the Polish FA decided not to extend his contract past July.

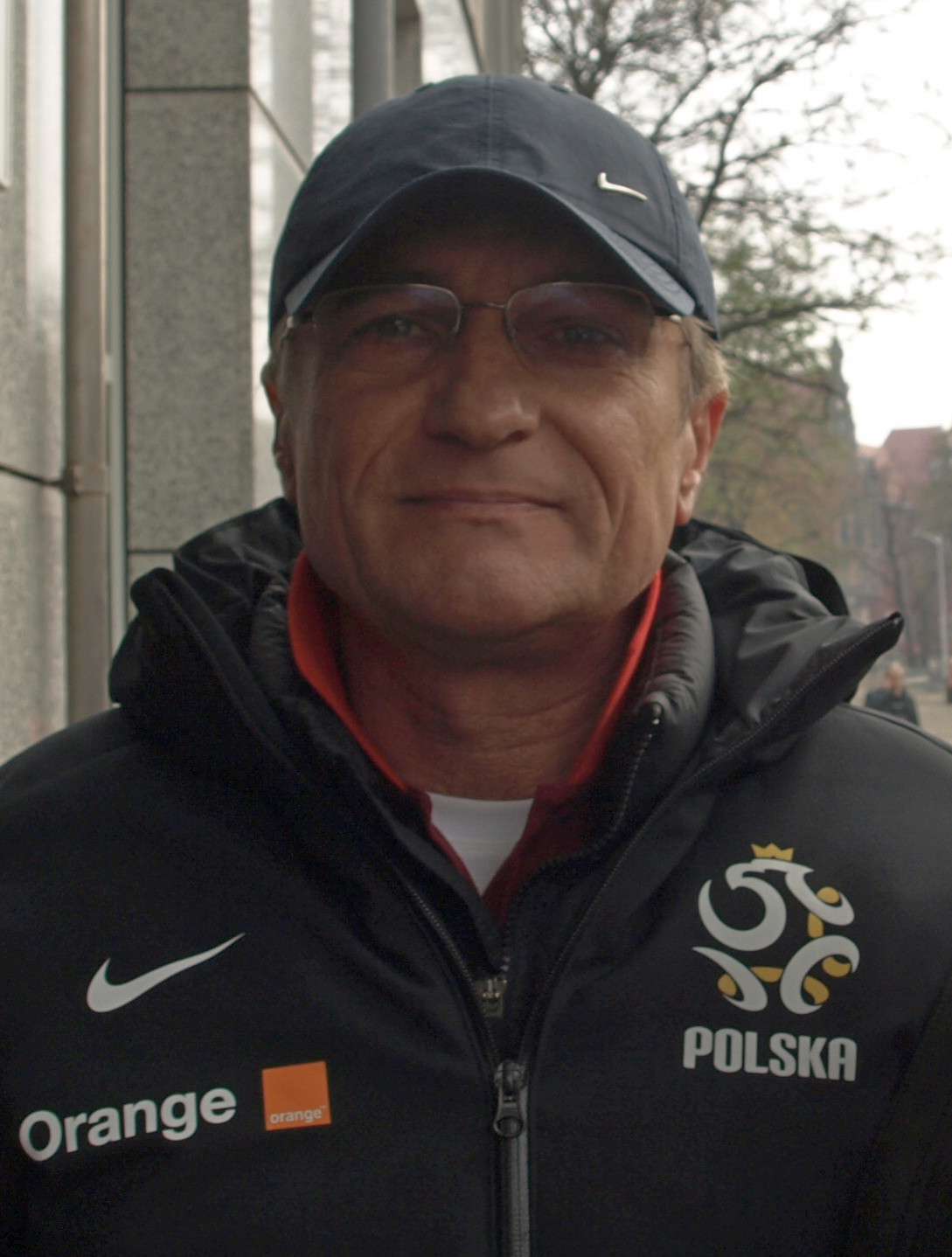
Nawałka in 2013

On 25 November 2018, Nawałka was appointed manager of Ekstraklasa side Lech Poznań on a deal until mid-2021. On 31 March 2019, he was relieved of his duties after achieving two wins in the last seven matches. He left Lech with a record of five wins, one draw and five losses.

== Career statistics ==
=== International ===
Appearances and goals by national team and year
| National team | Year | Apps | Goals |
|---|---|---|---|
Poland
| Poland | 1977 | 8 | 1 |
| Poland | 1978 | 9 | 0 |
| Poland | 1979 | 8 | 0 |
| Poland | 1980 | 9 | 0 |
| Total | | 34 | 1 |

Scores and results list Poland's goal tally first, score column indicates score after each Nawałka goal.

List of international goals scored by Adam Nawałka
| No. | Date | Venue | Opponent | Score | Result | Competition |
|---|---|---|---|---|---|---|
| 1 | 13 April 1977 | Népstadion, Budapest, Hungary | Hungary | 1–1 | 1–2 | Friendly |

== Managerial statistics ==
As of 31 March 2019

Managerial record by team and tenure
| Team | From | To | Record | | | | |
| Team | From | To | M | W | D | L | Win % |
|---|---|---|---|---|---|---|---|
| Wisła Kraków | 19 March 2000 | 30 June 2000 | 17 | 10 | 3 | 4 | 58.82 |
| Wisła Kraków | 6 April 2001 | 22 June 2001 | 14 | 8 | 2 | 4 | 57.14 |
| Zagłębie Lubin | 18 June 2002 | 6 October 2002 | 11 | 2 | 2 | 7 | 18.18 |
| Sandecja Nowy Sącz | 10 July 2003 | 5 July 2004 | 34 | 10 | 12 | 12 | 29.41 |
| Jagiellonia Białystok | 1 September 2004 | 20 April 2006 | 56 | 26 | 20 | 10 | 46.43 |
| Wisła Kraków | 19 December 2006 | 16 April 2007 | 9 | 3 | 5 | 1 | 33.33 |
| GKS Katowice | 21 September 2008 | 31 December 2009 | 44 | 16 | 13 | 15 | 36.36 |
| Górnik Zabrze | 1 January 2010 | 31 October 2013 | 125 | 56 | 29 | 40 | 44.80 |
| Poland | 1 November 2013 | 30 July 2018 | 50 | 26 | 15 | 9 | 52.00 |
| Lech Poznań | 25 November 2018 | 31 March 2019 | 11 | 5 | 1 | 5 | 45.45 |
| Total | | | 371 | 162 | 102 | 107 | 43.67 |

== Honours ==
=== Player ===
Wisła Kraków

- Ekstraklasa: 1977–78

Individual

- Polish Newcomer of the Year: 1977

=== Manager ===
Wisła Kraków

- Ekstraklasa: 2000–01
- Polish League Cup: 2000–01

Sandecja Nowy Sącz

- Polish Cup (Nowy Sącz regionals): 2003–04

Individual

- Polish Coach of the Year: 2015, 2016, 2017
- Ekstraklasa Coach of the Month: September 2012, October 2012
- Piłka Nożna Man of the Year: 2014
