= Paweł Janas =

Polish footballer and manager

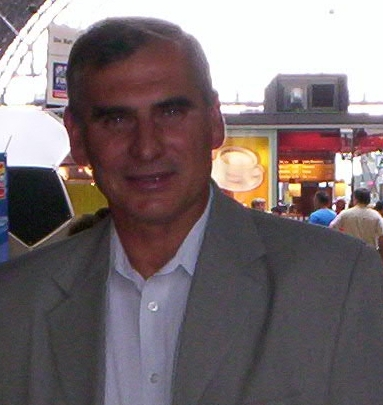
- Janas in 2005

Personal information
- Date of birth: 4 March 1953 (age 73)
- Place of birth: Pabianice, Polish People's Republic
- Height: 1.85 m (6 ft 1 in)
- Position: Defender

Youth career
- 1965–1971: Włókniarz Pabianice

Senior career*
Years	Team	Apps	(Gls)
1973–1977	Widzew Łódź	70	(2)
1978–1982	Legia Warsaw	108	(0)
1982–1986	Auxerre	135	(1)
1986–1988	Legia Warsaw	49	(0)
Total		362	(3)

International career
1976–1984	Poland	53	(1)

Managerial career
- 1994–1996: Legia Warsaw
- 1996–1999: Poland Olympic
- 2001: Amica Wronki
- 2003–2006: Poland
- 2008–2009: GKS Bełchatów
- 2009–2010: Widzew Łódź
- 2010: Polonia Warsaw
- 2011: GKS Bełchatów
- 2011–2012: Lechia Gdańsk
- 2013–2015: Bytovia Bytów
Medal record
Representing Poland
FIFA World Cup
Bronze medal – third place	1982 Spain
- * Club domestic league appearances and goals

Paweł Janas ([ˈpavɛw ˈjanas]; born 4 March 1953) is a Polish former football manager and player who played as a defender. He was voted the Polish Coach of the Year four times.

== Career ==
=== Club ===
He began his playing career for the Włókniarz Pabianice team in 1965, but later left the club in 1973.

=== National team ===
From 1976 to 1984, he won 53 international caps for Poland. Janas played at centre-back in all seven of Poland's games at the 1982 World Cup in Spain where the team achieved an unexpected third place.

== Managerial career ==
Janas' coaching career started as an assistant at Legia Warsaw in 1988. He later ended his work at Legia in 1990, and took up a post helping Władysław Stachurski lead the Polish youth squad. He was assistant to Janusz Wójcik at the 1992 Summer Olympics in Barcelona where Poland won the silver medal. In the same year he again became Wójcik's assistant, this time at Legia.

From 1994 to 1996, Janas was the head coach at Legia where he and his team won the league title (1993–94, 1994–95), Polish Cup (1994, 1995), Polish Super Cup (1994), as well as advanced to the quarter-finals of the UEFA Champions' Cup (1995–96 season).

From 1996 to 1999, Janas coached the Poland Olympic national team, which advanced to the quarter-finals of the European Championships. From 1999, he worked as the manager and vice-president of sports at Amica Wronki until 2002.

On 20 December 2002, he officially took charge of the Poland national team. He was heavily criticized in the beginning of his national team spell, despite achieving good results. Nonetheless, under Janas the Poland team qualified for the 2006 FIFA World Cup, finishing second in a qualifying group behind England. They qualified as the best second placed team, scoring 27 goals in the qualifiers, 10 more than the group leaders England.

In the final tournament, Poland were drawn with Ecuador, hosts Germany and Costa Rica. Their first game, against Ecuador in Gelsenkirchen, ended in a disappointing 2–0 defeat, and Janas received criticism from the Polish press for his team selection and tactics, which involved leaving striker Maciej Żurawski alone and unsupported up front. He played a 4–5–1 formation, which he said "safety first". Poland played well with 4–4–2 in the qualifiers, which resulted in flowing football.

Poland played much better in their second game, against the Germans in Dortmund, but again lost, this time 1–0 to a late goal by Oliver Neuville, despite a magnificent performance by their goalkeeper Artur Boruc. This meant that the third match, against Costa Rica in Hamburg, was meaningless; Poland won 2–1 with two goals by defender Bartosz Bosacki. Janas was sacked from his post by the Polish Football Association after the tournament.

In 2008, he became manager of Ekstraklasa side GKS Bełchatów, leading them to a 5th place standing at the half-way point of the 2008–09 season but resigned during the winter break, citing lack of squad depth which would not allow the team to challenge for a higher position.

In January 2009, he accepted the managerial position at Widzew Łódź. In June, the club won the second division but was not allowed to advance by the PZPN due to their involvement in a match-fixing scandal years prior. After winning the title again in 2010, Janas decided to leave the club in June.

In September, he became a manager at Polonia Warsaw.

In August 2013, he was appointed as manager at Bytovia Bytów. On 24 May 2014, his club was promoted to the I liga.

== Career statistics ==
=== International ===
Appearances and goals by national team and year
National team	Year	Apps	Goals
Poland	1976	3	0
Poland	1977	4	0
Poland	1978	1	0
Poland	1979	10	1
Poland	1980	16	0
Poland	1981	6	0
Poland	1982	10	0
Poland	1983	2	0
Poland	1984	1	0
Total		53	1

== Honours ==
=== Player ===
Legia Warsaw

- Polish Cup: 1979–80, 1980–81

Poland

- FIFA World Cup third place: 1982

=== Manager ===
Legia Warsaw

- Ekstraklasa: 1993–94, 1994–95
- Polish Cup: 1993–94, 1994–95
- Polish Super Cup: 1994

Widzew Łódź

- I liga: 2008–09, 2009–10

Individual

- Polish Manager of the Year: 1994, 1995, 2004, 2005
