= Robert Góralczyk (football manager) =

Polish football manager and sporting director

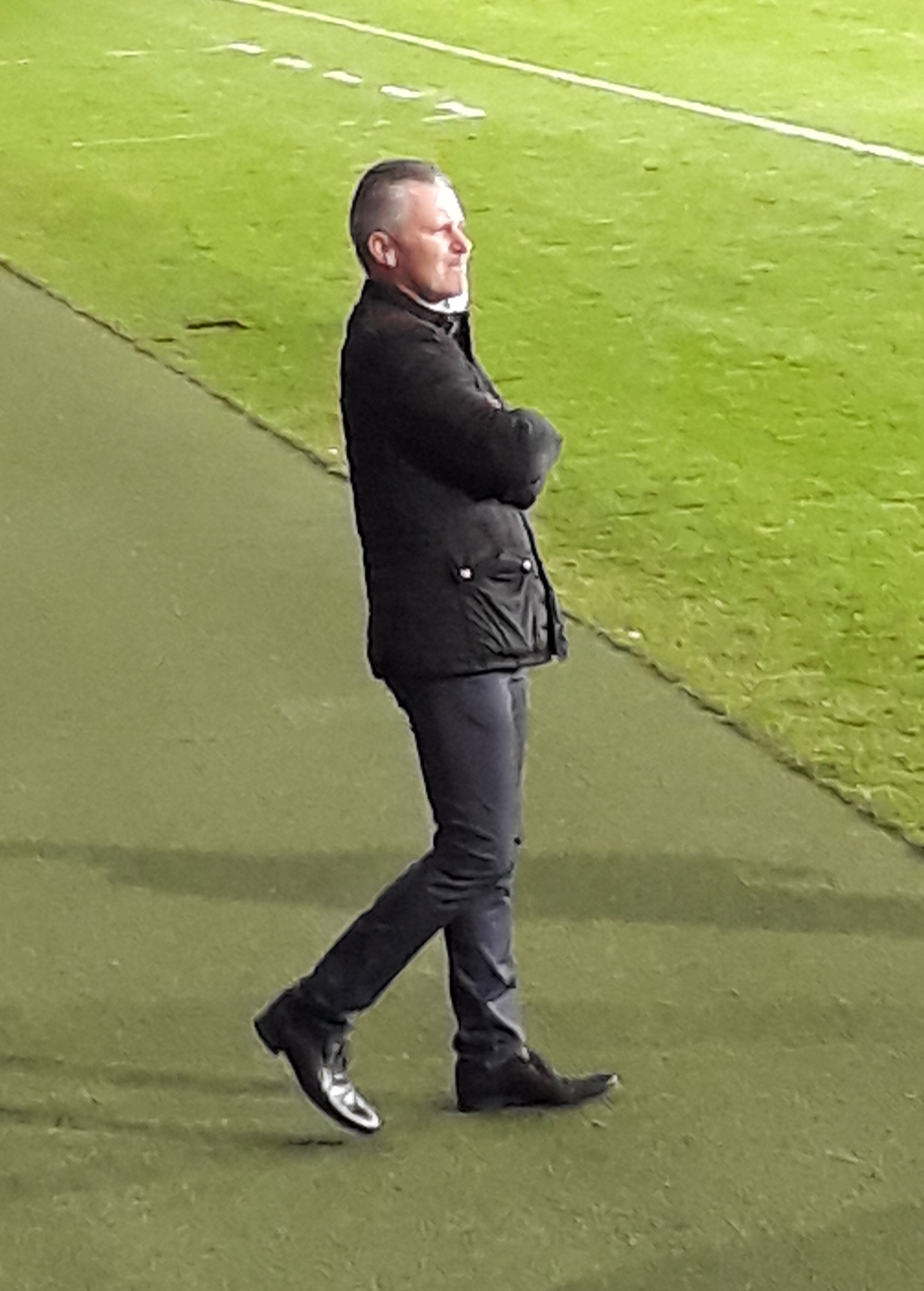
- Góralczyk in 2019 as Motor Lublin manager

Personal information
- Full name: Robert Góralczyk
- Date of birth: 1 August 1974 (age 52)
- Place of birth: Chorzów, Poland

Managerial career
- Years: Team
- 2005–2006: Polonia Bytom (assistant)
- Poland U17 (women's)
- Poland U18 (women's)
- 2008–2009: Przebój Wolbrom
- 2009–2010: Poland (women's)
- 2010–2011: Polonia Bytom
- 2012–2013: GKS Katowice (assistant)
- 2013–2015: BKS Stal Bielsko-Biała (assistant)
- 2015–2018: Poland (assistant)
- 2018–2019: Motor Lublin
- 2023–2025: Poland (assistant)
- 2025–2026: GKS Tychy (assistant)

Robert Góralczyk (born 1 August 1974) is a Polish professional football manager who was most recently the assistant coach of II liga club GKS Tychy.

== Coaching and management career ==
On 9 June 2019, Góralczyk was appointed as sporting director of GKS Katowice.

On 20 September 2023, Góralczyk was revealed as one of three assistants joining the coaching staff of the Poland national team, following Michał Probierz's appointment as the head coach. He was dismissed along with Probierz in June 2025.

On 12 November 2025, I liga club GKS Tychy announced Góralczyk would join them as an assistant under newly appointed manager Łukasz Piszczek, starting from 1 December. On 9 March the following year, Góralczyk left GKS along with Piszczek.

== Managerial statistics ==
As of match played 8 June 2019

Managerial record by team and tenure
| Team | From | To | Record | | | | | | | |
| Team | From | To | G | W | D | L | GF | GA | GD | Win % |
|---|---|---|---|---|---|---|---|---|---|---|
| Przebój Wolbrom | 15 September 2008 | 17 June 2009 | 24 | 10 | 7 | 7 | 42 | 33 | +9 | 41.67 |
| Poland (women's) | 17 June 2009 | 13 December 2010 | 14 | 6 | 1 | 7 | 23 | 26 | −3 | 42.86 |
| Polonia Bytom | 13 December 2010 | 24 May 2011 | 13 | 2 | 4 | 7 | 15 | 23 | −8 | 15.38 |
| Motor Lublin | 8 October 2018 | 30 June 2019 | 26 | 16 | 6 | 4 | 50 | 27 | +23 | 61.54 |
| Total | | | 77 | 34 | 18 | 25 | 130 | 109 | +21 | 44.16 |

== Honours ==
Motor Lublin

- Polish Cup (Lublin subdistrict regionals): 2018–19
