= Orest Lenczyk =

Polish football manager (1942–2024)

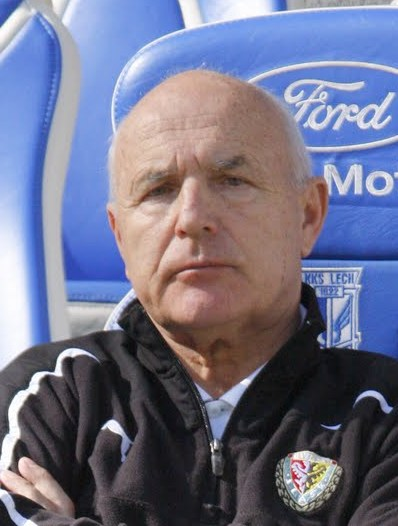
- Lenczyk with Śląsk Wrocław in 2012

Personal information
- Date of birth: 28 December 1942
- Place of birth: Sanok, General Government
- Date of death: 11 June 2024 (aged 81)
- Place of death: Kraków, Poland
- Position: Midfielder

Senior career*
Years	Team	Apps	(Gls)
- Sanoczanka Sanok
- Stomil Poznań
- Ślęza Wrocław
- Moto Jelcz Oława

Managerial career
- 1970–1971: Karpaty Krosno
- 1972: Stal Rzeszów (assistant)
- 1972–1974: Siarka Tarnobrzeg
- 1974–1975: Stal Mielec (assistant)
- 1975–1977: Wisła Kraków (assistant)
- 1977–1979: Wisła Kraków
- 1979–1981: Śląsk Wrocław
- 1982–1984: Ruch Chorzów
- 1984–1985: Wisła Kraków
- 1985–1986: Igloopol Dębica
- 1987–1988: Widzew Łódź
- 1990–1991: GKS Katowice
- 1994: Wisła Kraków
- 1995: Pogoń Szczecin
- 1995–1996: GKS Katowice
- 1996–1999: Ruch Chorzów
- 1999: GKS Bełchatów
- 1999–2000: Widzew Łódź
- 2000–2001: Wisła Kraków
- 2002: Ruch Chorzów
- 2005–2008: GKS Bełchatów
- 2009: Zagłębie Lubin
- 2009–2010: Cracovia
- 2010–2012: Śląsk Wrocław
- 2013–2014: Zagłębie Lubin
- * Club domestic league appearances and goals

Orest Lenczyk (Polish pronunciation: [ˈɔrɛst ˈlɛnt͡ʂɨk]; 28 December 1942 – 11 June 2024) was a Polish professional football player and manager.

== Playing career ==
Lenczyk was born in Sanok. A midfielder, he played for lower divisions teams such as Sanoczanka Sanok, Stomil Poznań, Ślęza Wrocław, and Moto-Jelcz Oława. At the age of 28, Lenczyk ended his career as a footballer, and began working as a coach.

== Managerial career ==
At first, Lenczyk coached in several teams of southeastern Poland, before finding a job at Wisła Kraków in 1975, where he was an assistant. Next year, he became the manager of Wisła's first team, winning the league title in the 1977–78 season. Furthermore, Lenczyk's Wisła got to the quarter-finals of the 1978–79 European Cup, beating Club Brugge, and Zbrojovka Brno, only to lose to the runner-up, Malmö. Lenczyk worked for Wisła on several occasions (1984–1985, 1994, 2000–2001), and during his last season in Kraków, he won promotion to the second round of the UEFA Cup, after eliminating Real Zaragoza.

In October 2005, he got a job at GKS Bełchatów. After a first, difficult season, GKS finished the 2006–07 season as runners-up, with such players, as Radosław Matusiak, Paweł Strąk, Łukasz Garguła and Piotr Lech. He was fired in March 2008, after five defeats in a row. On 16 April 2009, he was named head coach of Zagłębie Lubin, winning promotion to the Ekstraklasa. In August 2009, Lenczyk became the coach of Cracovia, replacing Artur Płatek. After problems with Cracovia's management, he came to terms with the higher-ups to dissolve his contract.

On 27 September 2010, he was named the successor to Ryszard Tarasiewicz at Śląsk Wrocław. The team finished runners-up in the 2010–11 season. In the following campaign, Śląsk won the league title.

== Death ==
Lenczyk died on 11 June 2024, at the age of 81. He was buried on 15 June at the Bielany Cemetery in Kraków.

== Honours ==
Wisła Kraków

- Ekstraklasa: 1977–78

GKS Katowice

- Polish Super Cup: 1995

Śląsk Wrocław

- Ekstraklasa: 2011–12
- Polish Super Cup: 2012
- Ekstraklasa Coach of the Month: March 2011, September 2011

Individual

- Polish Coach of the Year: 1990, 2006
- Ekstraklasa Coach of the Season: 2010–11

== See also ==
Media related to Orest Lenczyk at Wikimedia Commons
