= 2000–01 Polish Cup =

Tournament details
- Country: Poland
- Teams: 89

Final positions
- Champions: Polonia Warsaw
- Runners-up: Górnik Zabrze

Tournament statistics
- Matches played: 92
- Goals scored: 275 (2.99 per match)
- Top goal scorer(s): Daniel Barzyński; Adam Kompała (6 goals each)

The 2000–01 Polish Cup was the forty-seventh season of the annual Polish cup competition. It began on 27 June 2000 with the preliminary round and ended on 27 May 2001 with second leg of the Final, played at Stadion Polonii, Warsaw. The winners qualified for the qualifying round of the UEFA Cup. Amica Wronki were the defending champions.

== Preliminary round ==
The matches took place on 27 June and 2 July 2000.

Team 1	Score	Team 2
27 June 2000
Czarni Żagań	1–0	Miedź Legnica
Jagiellonka Nieszawa	4–2	Unia Skierniewice
2 July 2000
Gryf 95 Słupsk	1–3	Kotwica Kołobrzeg
Drwęca Nowe Miasto Lubawskie	3–0	Błękitni Orneta
AZS Podlasie Biała Podlaska	2–5	Pogoń Siedlce
LZS Kwiatkowice	4–0	Raków II Częstochowa
Amica II Wronki	4–2	GKP Gorzów Wielkopolski
Polonia Leszno	1–1 (a.e.t.) (6–5 p)	Polonia Środa Wielkopolska
Bielawianka Bielawa	3–3 (a.e.t.) (5–6 p)	Olimpia Kamienna Góra

== Round 1 ==
The matches took place on 9 August 2000.

Team 1	Score	Team 2
9 August 2000
Mec Sławięcice	2–3	Śląsk Wrocław
Inkopax Wrocław	2–4	GKS Grunwald Ruda Śląska
Olimpia Kamienna Góra	0–3	Odra Opole
Podbeskidzie Bielsko-Biała	1–2	Włókniarz Kietrz
LKS Jankowy	1–0	GKS Katowice
Aluminium Konin	0–1	MKS Myszków
Szczakowianka Jaworzno	2–1	RKS Radomsko
LZS Kwiatkowice	0–5	KSZO Ostrowiec Świętokrzyski
Kasztelan Sierpc	0–2	LKS Ceramika Opoczno
Błękitni Stargard Szczeciński	1–2	Czarni Żagań
Spartakus Razem Daleszyce	2–2 (a.e.t.) (4–5 p)	Raków Częstochowa
Wigry Suwałki	1–1 (a.e.t.) (1–4 p)	Jeziorak Iława
HEKO Czermno	1–3	Polar Wrocław
Sparta Szepietowo	0–0 (a.e.t.) (3–4 p)	Dolcan Ząbki
Jagiellonia Białystok	1–0	Świt Nowy Dwór Mazowiecki
Jagiellonka Nieszawa	2–0	Włókniarz Konstantynów Łódzki
Drwęca Nowe Miasto Lubawskie	0–5	Amica II Wronki
Okocimski KS Brzesko	1–1 (a.e.t.) (2–4 p)	Siarka Tarnobrzeg
Wawel Kraków	0–2	Stal Stalowa Wola
Narew Ostrołęka	2–3	Hetman Zamość
Pogoń Siedlce	3–0	KS Lublinianka
Sandecja Nowy Sącz	2–1	Hutnik Kraków
Czuwaj Przemyśl	0–5	Górnik Łęczna
Radomiak Radom	0–1	GKS Bełchatów
Granica Dorohusk	0–5	Pogoń Staszów
Stal Rzeszów	3–1 (a.e.t.)	Stal Sanok
Polonia Lidzbark Warmiński	1–4	Lechia Gdańsk
Granica Lubycza Królewska	0–1	Korona Kielce
Gryf Wejherowo	0–1	MKS Mława
No match
Polonia Leszno	w/o^{1}	Polonia Bytom
Kotwica Kołobrzeg	w/o^{2}	Odra Szczecin
Zawisza Bydgoszcz	w/o^{3}	Konin Bydgoszcz

Notes

- Note 1: Polonia Leszno withdrew from the competition.
- Note 2: Odra Szczecin withdrew from the competition.
- Note 3: Konin Bydgoszcz withdrew from the competition.

== Round 2 ==
The matches took place on 13 September 2000.

Team 1	Score	Team 2
13 September 2000
Jeziorak Iława	1–1 (a.e.t.) (4–3 p)	Lechia Gdańsk
Dolcan Ząbki	1–2	Siarka Tarnobrzeg
Korona Kielce	0–1	Odra Opole
MKS Mława	3–2	KSZO Ostrowiec Świętokrzyski
Jagiellonia Białystok	0–3	Górnik Łęczna
Raków Częstochowa	0–2	Włókniarz Kietrz
Sandecja Nowy Sącz	2–0	GKS Grunwald Ruda Śląska
Stal Rzeszów	0–2	Polonia Bytom
Pogoń Siedlce	3–1	Stal Stalowa Wola
Jagiellonka Nieszawa	0–3	GKS Bełchatów
LKS Jankowy	1–2	MKS Myszków
Zawisza Bydgoszcz	0–5	LKS Ceramika Opoczno
Szczakowianka Jaworzno	1–3 (a.e.t.)	Śląsk Wrocław
Amica II Wronki	1–2	Kotwica Kołobrzeg
Czarni Żagań	1–2 (a.e.t.)	Polar Wrocław
Pogoń Staszów	2–1	Hetman Zamość

== Round 3 ==
The matches took place on 23 September 2000.

Team 1	Score	Team 2
23 September 2000
MKS Myszków	0–1	Legia Warsaw
Siarka Tarnobrzeg	0–2	Ruch Radzionków
Śląsk Wrocław	1–1 (a.e.t.) (3–1 p)	Włókniarz Kietrz
ŁKS Łódź	2–2 (a.e.t.) (2–3 p)	Polonia Warsaw
Pogoń Siedlce	4–1	Kotwica Kołobrzeg
MKS Mława	0–1	Polar Wrocław
Górnik Łęczna	2–1	Wisła Kraków
Pogoń Staszów	0–1	Stomil Olsztyn
Jeziorak Iława	0–2	GKS Bełchatów
LKS Ceramika Opoczno	2–1	Polonia Bytom
Dyskobolia Grodzisk Wlkp.	1–3	Ruch Chorzów
Sandecja Nowy Sącz	1–2	Zagłębie Lubin
Lech Poznań	0–1	Odra Wodzisław
Górnik Zabrze	3–0	Widzew Łódź
Orlen Płock	1–0	Amica Wronki
Odra Opole	2–1	Pogoń Szczecin

== Round 4 ==
The matches took place on 22 November 2000.

Team 1	Score	Team 2
22 November 2000
GKS Bełchatów	0–1	Stomil Olsztyn
Górnik Łęczna	4–1	LKS Ceramika Opoczno
Odra Wodzisław	0–4	Polonia Warsaw
Śląsk Wrocław	2–6	Legia Warsaw
Odra Opole	3–0	Ruch Chorzów
Orlen Płock	3–1 (a.e.t.)	Ruch Radzionków
Polar Wrocław	0–1	Zagłębie Lubin
Pogoń Siedlce	0–2	Górnik Zabrze

== Quarter-finals ==
The first legs took place on 7 March, when the second legs took place on 14 March 2001.

Team 1	Agg.	Team 2	1st leg	2nd leg
Polonia Warsaw	4–2	Stomil Olsztyn	2–1	2–1
Zagłębie Lubin	4–1	Legia Warsaw	4–0	0–1
Górnik Łęczna	1–4	Górnik Zabrze	0–2	1–2
Odra Opole	2–1	Orlen Płock	2–1	0–0

== Semi-finals ==
The first legs took place on 11 April, when the second legs took place on 18 April 2001.

Team 1	Agg.	Team 2	1st leg	2nd leg
Zagłębie Lubin	2–2 (a)	Polonia Warsaw	1–2	1–0
Odra Opole	1–3	Górnik Zabrze	1–1	0–2

== Final ==
=== First leg ===
16 May 2001
17:45 CEST (UTC+02:00)

Górnik Zabrze	1–2	Polonia Warsaw
Probierz 54' (pen.)	Report	Bąk 43'; Pawlak 67'

Stadion im. Ernesta Pohla, Zabrze
Attendance: 2,216
Referee: Zbigniew Marczyk (Piła)

=== Second leg ===
27 May 2001
17:15 CEST (UTC+02:00)

Polonia Warsaw	2–2	Górnik Zabrze
Pawlak 34' (pen.); Bąk 83'	Report	Gierczak 28', 71'

Stadion Polonii, Warsaw
Attendance: 3,500
Referee: Tomasz Mikulski (Lublin)

Polonia Warsaw won 4–3 on aggregate
