= Adam Kompała =

Polish footballer (born 1973)

Personal information
- Date of birth: 16 August 1973 (age 53)
- Place of birth: Ruda Śląska, Poland
- Height: 1.77 m (5 ft 10 in)
- Position: Midfielder

Senior career*
Years	Team	Apps	(Gls)
1989–1993	Górnik Zabrze	0	(0)
1993–1998	Ruch Radzionków		
1998–2003	Górnik Zabrze	140	(40)
2003–2004	Szczakowianka Jaworzno	25	(8)
2004–2005	Podbeskidzie Bielsko-Biała	32	(4)
2005	Jagiellonia Białystok	6	(1)
2006–2008	Piast Gliwice	75	(18)
2008–2010	Ruch Radzionków	55	(10)
2011	Jastrząb Bielszowice		
- * Club domestic league appearances and goals

Adam Kompała (born 16 August 1973) is a Polish former professional footballer who played as a midfielder.

== Honours ==
Ruch Radzionków

- II liga West: 2009–10
- III liga Opole–Silesian: 2008–09

Individual

- Polish Newcomer of the Year: 1999
- Ekstraklasa top scorer: 1999–2000
- Polish Cup top scorer: 2000–01
