= Dawid Jarka =

Polish footballer

Personal information
- Full name: Dawid Jarka
- Date of birth: 15 August 1987 (age 39)
- Place of birth: Świerklaniec, Poland
- Height: 1.80 m (5 ft 11 in)
- Position: Striker

Team information
- Current team: Unia Strzybnica (manager)

Youth career
- Unia Świerklaniec
- Polonia Bytom
- 2004–2005: Gwarek Zabrze

Senior career*
Years	Team	Apps	(Gls)
2005–2006	Gwarek Zabrze		
2006	→ AEL (loan)	0	(0)
2006–2010	Górnik Zabrze	47	(14)
2008	→ ŁKS Łódź (loan)	10	(2)
2010	→ Ruch Radzionków (loan)	11	(5)
2010–2011	Ruch Radzionków	31	(6)
2011–2012	GKS Katowice	7	(0)
2012–2013	GKS Tychy	10	(0)
2013	→ Polonia Bytom (loan)	32	(10)
2014	Odra Opole	13	(4)
2014–2015	ROW Rybnik	8	(2)
2015–2022	Gwarek Tarnowskie Góry		
2022	LKS Bełk	15	(6)
2023–2026	Przemsza Siewierz	60	(14)

International career
2007–2008	Poland U21	5	(0)

Managerial career
- 2025–2026: Przemsza Siewierz (player-manager)
- 2026–: Unia Strzybnica
- * Club domestic league appearances and goals as of 10:14, 20 July 2026 (UTC)

Dawid Jarka (born 15 August 1987) is a Polish professional football manager and former player who played as a striker. He is currently in charge of Unia Strzybnica.

== Club career ==
In the summer 2010, Jarka moved to Ruch Radzionków from Górnik Zabrze.

In July 2011, he joined GKS Katowice.

In August 2015, he joined Gwarek Tarnowskie Góry.

On 29 July 2022, Jarka moved to IV liga club LKS Bełk.

== International career ==
He has also played for the Poland national under-21 team.

== Managerial career ==
On 27 March 2025, Jarka was appointed player-manager of fifth-tier club Przemsza Siewierz, where he previously held the role of playing assistant. Two days later, he led Przemsza to a 3–0 win over Unia Dąbrowa Górnicza in his managerial debut.

On 15 July 2026, a week after leaving Przemsza, Jarka took charge of regional league club Unia Strzybnica.

== Managerial statistics ==
As of match played 6 June 2026

Managerial record by team and tenure
Team	From	To	Record							
Team	From	To	G	W	D	L	GF	GA	GD	Win %
Przemsza Siewierz (player-manager)	27 March 2025	8 July 2026	53	15	8	30	96	135	−39	28.30
Unia Strzybnica	15 July 2026	Present	0	0	0	0	0	0	+0	—
Total			53	15	8	30	96	135	−39	28.30

== Honours ==
Ruch Radzionków

- II liga West: 2009–10

Gwarek Tarnowskie Góry

- IV liga Silesia I: 2015–16, 2016–17
