= Mariusz Pawlak =

Polish footballer

Personal information
- Full name: Mariusz Pawlak
- Date of birth: 19 January 1972 (age 54)
- Place of birth: Gdańsk, Poland
- Height: 1.77 m (5 ft 10 in)
- Position: Defender

Youth career
- 1983–1989: Lechia Gdańsk

Senior career*
Years	Team	Apps	(Gls)
1989–1996	Lechia Gdańsk	195	(12)
1996–2002	Polonia Warsaw	137	(8)
2002–2006	Dyskobolia	62	(5)
2005	→ Obra Kościan (loan)		
2006–2007	Lechia Gdańsk	23	(2)
2007–2008	Polonia Warsaw	20	(1)
2009–2011	Olimpia Grudziądz	51	(6)

International career
2000	Poland	1	(0)

Managerial career
- 2011–2012: Znicz Pruszków
- 2012–2016: Chojniczanka Chojnice
- 2016–2017: Gryf Wejherowo
- 2017–2018: GKS Bełchatów
- 2018–2019: Olimpia Grudziądz
- 2019–2023: Wisła Puławy
- 2023–2024: Olimpia Grudziądz
- 2024–2026: Polonia Warsaw
- * Club domestic league appearances and goals

Mariusz Pawlak (born 19 January 1972) is a Polish professional football manager and former player. He was most recently in charge of Polonia Warsaw.

== Career ==
=== Club ===
In June 2007, he joined Polonia Warsaw on a two-year contract.

=== International ===
Pawlak made one appearance for the Poland national football team.

== Coaching career ==
On 6 November 2019, Pawlak was appointed manager of Wisła Puławy. With his team, he was promoted to the II liga in the 2020–21 season.

== Managerial statistics ==
As of match played 28 May 2026

Managerial record by team and tenure
Team	From	To	Record							
Team	From	To	G	W	D	L	GF	GA	GD	Win %
Znicz Pruszków	20 June 2011	30 June 2012	32	14	12	6	37	21	+16	43.75
Chojniczanka Chojnice	1 July 2012	9 April 2016	137	55	37	45	186	142	+44	40.15
Gryf Wejherowo	1 July 2016	2 January 2017	20	5	4	11	24	39	−15	25.00
GKS Bełchatów	10 January 2017	10 April 2018	41	17	9	15	59	56	+3	41.46
Olimpia Grudziądz	12 June 2018	27 August 2019	42	20	6	16	78	62	+16	47.62
Wisła Puławy	6 November 2019	30 June 2023	120	66	23	31	238	135	+103	55.00
Olimpia Grudziądz	9 October 2023	30 June 2024	22	7	8	7	21	20	+1	31.82
Polonia Warsaw	25 August 2024	30 May 2026	68	33	15	20	107	90	+17	48.53
Total			482	217	114	151	750	565	+185	45.02

== Honours ==
=== As a player ===
Polonia Warsaw

- Ekstraklasa : 1999–2000
- Polish Cup: 2000–01
- Polish League Cup: 1999–00
- Polish Super Cup: 2000

Olimpia Grudziądz

- II liga West: 2010–11
- III liga Kuyavian-Pomeranian – Greater Poland: 2008–09

=== As a manager ===
Wisła Puławy

- III liga, group IV: 2020–21
- Polish Cup (Lublin Subdistrict regionals): 2020–21
