= Arkadiusz Bąk =

Polish footballer (born 1974)

- Bąk in 2009

Personal information
- Date of birth: 6 October 1974 (age 52)
- Place of birth: Stargard Szczeciński, Szczecin Voivodeship, Polish People's Republic
- Height: 1.76 m (5 ft 9 1/2 in)
- Position: Midfielder

Senior career*
Years	Team	Apps	(Gls)
1992–1993	Błękitni Stargard		
1993–1995	Olimpia Poznań		
1995	Lechia/Olimpia Gdańsk	14	(2)
1996	Amica Wronki	16	(4)
1996	Ruch Chorzów	14	(2)
1997–2001	Polonia Warsaw	129	(40)
2001	Birmingham City	4	(0)
2002	Widzew Łódź	8	(4)
2002	Polonia Warsaw	10	(6)
2003–2006	Amica Wronki	42	(6)
2006–2007	Lech Poznań	9	(3)
2007	Flota Świnoujście	10	(1)
2008–2014	Lech Poznań Oldboys		

International career
1998–2002	Poland	13	(0)
- * Club domestic league appearances and goals

Arkadiusz Bąk (Polish pronunciation: [arˈkadjuʐ ˈbɔŋk]; born 6 October 1974) is a Polish former professional footballer who played as a midfielder. With Polonia Warsaw, he won the Ekstraklasa title in the 1999–2000 season and the Polish Cup in the 2000–01 season. He also finished as the Ekstraklasa top scorer in the 1997–98 season. In addition, he represented the Poland national team at the 2002 FIFA World Cup.

== Club career ==
Bąk began his playing career in the early 1990s at Błękitni Stargard before moving to Olimpia Poznań in 1993. After spending two seasons at Olimpia Poznań, he joined Olimpia-Lechia Gdańsk in 1995, where he played in the top tier of Polish football. He subsequently played for Amica Wronki and Ruch Chorzów in 1996 before joining Polonia Warsaw in 1997.

Polonia Warsaw was a significant club in Bąk's career. Playing as a midfielder, he contributed to the team's attack and finished as the Ekstraklasa top scorer in the 1997–98 season with 14 goals. He continued to score regularly and helped Polonia Warsaw win the league title in the 1999–2000 season. In the 2000–01 season, he also won a major domestic trophy as the club claimed the Polish Cup.

In December 2001, Bąk moved to England to join Birmingham City. At the time, the club competed in the Football League First Division, where Bąk made four appearances. He returned to Poland in 2002 and played for Widzew Łódź, before making another spell at Polonia Warsaw.

In 2003, Bąk rejoined Amica Wronki. He remained at the club until the 2005–06 season, making appearances in the Ekstraklasa during this period. In 2006, he transferred to Lech Poznań, where he played until the end of the 2006–07 season.

== International career ==
Bąk made his debut for the Polish national team on 8 February 1998 in a friendly match against Paraguay. Poland lost the match 4–0.

In 2001, he participated in the 2002 FIFA World Cup qualifiers, appearing in matches against Wales and Armenia, as well as a match against Norway later that year.

Bąk was included in Poland's squad for the 2002 FIFA World Cup. He did not play in the group-stage matches against South Korea or the United States, but featured in the match against Portugal. Poland lost 4–0 to Portugal but defeated the United States 3–1 in their final group-stage match.

Bąk made a total of 13 appearances for the Polish national team and scored no goals.

== After retirement ==
After retiring from professional football, Bąk completed coaching courses and considered working as a youth football coach. In 2015, he moved to Norway, where he also organised football activities for local children. However, rather than pursuing a coaching career, he later began working at a ski resort in Geilo, Norway, where his duties include ski patrol and safety management.

== Career statistics ==
=== International ===
Appearances and goals by national team and year
National team	Year	Apps	Goals
Poland
Poland	1998	1	0
Poland	2001	7	0
Poland	2002	5	0
Total		13	0

== Honours ==
Polonia Warsaw

- Ekstraklasa: 1999–2000
- Polish Cup: 2000–01
- Polish League Cup: 1999–2000

Flota Świnoujście

- III liga, group II: 2007–08

Individual

- Ekstraklasa top scorer: 1997–98 (14 goals)
