= Gwarek Zabrze =

- Full name: Szkolny Klub Sportowy Gwarek Zabrze
- Founded: 12 June 1974; 50 years ago
- Ground: ul. Bytomska 100D
- Chairman: Marian Ryndak
- Manager: Marcin Rudyk
- League: Klasa A Zabrze
- 2023–24: Klasa A Zabrze, 2nd of 16
- Website: https://gwarekzabrze.eu
| colours | colours |

Szkolny Klub Sportowy Gwarek Zabrze is a Polish football club based in Zabrze, focusing on youth development.

== History ==
The club was established on 12 June 1974, inspired by the successes of the local club Górnik Zabrze in the 1970s. With the work of several local famous players and coaches within the local schools it was decided that a youth system should be implemented serving as feeder to Górnik Zabrze. The club are three-time youth champions of Poland, in 2002, 2003 and 2006. Besides the youth development teams, the club has had a senior team playing in the amateur divisions.

== Honours ==
- Polish Under-19 Championship
  - Champions: 2003, 2006
  - Runners-up: 1988, 1994, 1996, 1999, 2004
- Polish Under-17 Championship
  - Champions: 2002

== Players ==
Among most notable players who began their careers at Gwarek, or were spotted by Gwarek's scouts and purchased by the club in their teens, are Tomasz Cywka, Adam Danch, Dawid Jarka, Kamil Kosowski, Marcin Kuźba, Piotr Gierczak, Łukasz Piszczek, Tomasz Bandrowski, Przemysław Trytko.
