= Adam Danch =

Polish footballer (born 1987)

Personal information
- Full name: Adam Mateusz Danch
- Date of birth: 15 December 1987 (age 38)
- Place of birth: Ruda Śląska, Poland
- Height: 1.80 m (5 ft 11 in)
- Position: Centre-back

Team information
- Current team: Wawel Wirek
- Number: 6

Senior career*
Years	Team	Apps	(Gls)
- Wawel Wirek
2004–2006	Gwarek Zabrze		
2007–2017	Górnik Zabrze	273	(9)
2014	Górnik Zabrze II	2	(0)
2017–2021	Arka Gdynia	95	(4)
2022–2024	LKS Goczałkowice-Zdrój	62	(3)
2024–2025	AKS Mikołów	15	(1)
2025–	Wawel Wirek	20	(0)

International career
2007	Poland U20	4	(0)
2007–2008	Poland U21	5	(0)
2008–2012	Poland	2	(0)
- * Club domestic league appearances and goals as of 18:00, 30 June 2026 (UTC)

Adam Mateusz Danch (born 15 December 1987) is a Polish professional footballer who plays as a centre-back for regional league club Wawel Wirek.

== Career ==
=== Gwarek Zabrze ===
Danch started out at Gwarek Zabrze in the 2004–05 season and spent two seasons with the club.

=== Górnik Zabrze ===
On 1 July 2006, Danch moved to Gornik Zabrze for €20,000. He would go on to spend a decade at the club, making 303 appearances and scoring 10 goals. On 27 April 2017, Danch was let go by the club and he became a free agent.

=== Arka Gdynia ===
On 19 June 2017, Arka Gdynia approached Danch and offered him a two-year contract. On 6 December 2021, he left the club by mutual consent.

== International career ==
Danch played for the Poland U20 national team, starting in all four of Poland's games at the 2007 FIFA U-20 World Cup.

On 21 November 2008 Danch was called up by the Poland national team coach Leo Beenhakker for friendly matches in Antalya, Turkey.

== Career statistics ==
=== Club ===
As of match played 1 May 2026

Appearances and goals by club, season and competition
Club	Season	League			Polish Cup		Europe		Other		Total	
Club	Season	Division	Apps	Goals	Apps	Goals	Apps	Goals	Apps	Goals	Apps	Goals
Górnik Zabrze	2006–07	Ekstraklasa	14	0	0	0	—		3 (Note: Appearances in Ekstraklasa Cup)	0	17	0
Górnik Zabrze	2007–08	Ekstraklasa	24	0	1	1	—		10	0	35	1
Górnik Zabrze	2008–09	Ekstraklasa	23	0	0	0	—		6	0	29	0
Górnik Zabrze	2009–10	I liga	27	0	1	0	—		—		28	0
Górnik Zabrze	2010–11	Ekstraklasa	21	0	1	0	—		—		22	0
Górnik Zabrze	2011–12	Ekstraklasa	25	1	1	0	—		—		26	1
Górnik Zabrze	2012–13	Ekstraklasa	29	3	1	0	—		—		30	3
Górnik Zabrze	2013–14	Ekstraklasa	14	2	1	0	—		—		15	2
Górnik Zabrze	2014–15	Ekstraklasa	36	1	2	0	—		—		38	1
Górnik Zabrze	2015–16	Ekstraklasa	36	2	1	0	—		—		37	2
Górnik Zabrze	2016–17	I liga	24	0	2	0	—		—		26	0
Górnik Zabrze	Total		273	9	11	1	—		19	0	303	10
Górnik Zabrze II	2013–14	III liga, gr. F	2	0	—		—		—		2	0
Arka Gdynia	2017–18	Ekstraklasa	8	0	4	0	0	0	0	0	12	0
Arka Gdynia	2018–19	Ekstraklasa	24	1	2	0	—		0	0	26	1
Arka Gdynia	2019–20	Ekstraklasa	28	2	1	0	—		—		29	2
Arka Gdynia	2020–21	I liga	31	1	6	1	—		1 (Note: Appearance in I liga promotion play-offs)	0	38	2
Arka Gdynia	2021–22	I liga	3	0	2	0	—		—		5	0
Arka Gdynia	Total		94	4	15	1	—		1	0	110	5
LKS Goczałkowice-Zdrój	2021–22	III liga, gr. III	15	1	—		—		—		15	1
LKS Goczałkowice-Zdrój	2022–23	III liga, gr. III	19	1	—		—		—		19	1
LKS Goczałkowice-Zdrój	2023–24	III liga, gr. III	28	1	—		—		—		28	1
LKS Goczałkowice-Zdrój	Total		62	3	—		—		—		62	3
AKS Mikołów	2024–25	V liga Silesia I	15	1	—		—		—		15	1
Wawel Wirek	2025–26	Regional league Silesia IV	20	0	—		—		—		20	0
Career total			466	17	26	2	0	0	20	0	512	19

=== International ===
Appearances and goals by national team and year
National team	Year	Apps	Goals
Poland
Poland	2008	1	0
Poland	2012	1	0
Total		2	0

== Honours ==
LKS Goczałkowice-Zdrój

- Polish Cup (Tychy regionals): 2023–24
