= Nowe Chechło =

- Village
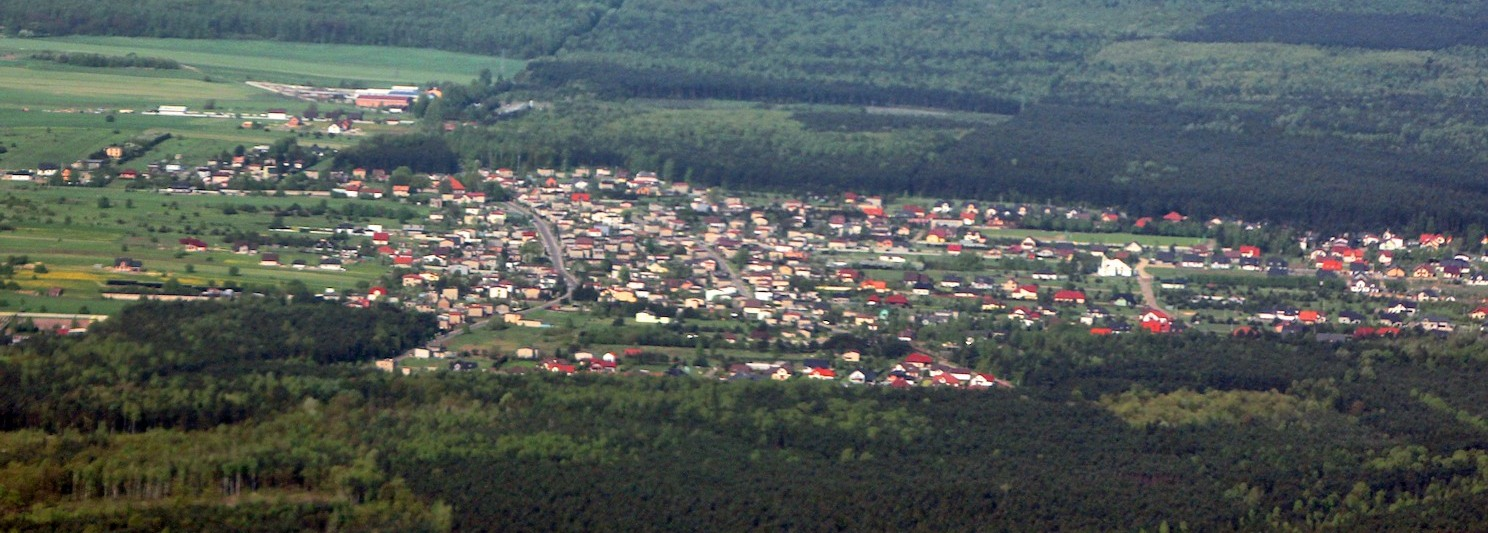

- Location within Poland
- Coordinates: 50°27′6″N 18°55′35″E
- Country: Poland
- Voivodeship: Silesian
- County: Tarnowskie Góry
- Gmina: Świerklaniec
- Population: 1,300

Nowe Chechło [ˈnɔvɛ ˈxɛxwɔ] is a village in the administrative district of Gmina Świerklaniec, within Tarnowskie Góry County, Silesian Voivodeship, in southern Poland.
