= Gmina Świerklaniec =

Gmina Świerklaniec Świerklaniec Commune
- Gmina
- Coat of arms
- Interactive map of Gmina Świerklaniec
- Coordinates (Świerklaniec): 50°26′N 18°57′E
- Country: Poland
- Voivodeship: Silesian
- County: Tarnowskie Góry
- Seat: Świerklaniec

Area
  - Total: 44.26 km^{2} (17.09 sq mi)

Population (2019-06-30)
  - Total: 12,328
  - Density: 278.5/km^{2} (721.4/sq mi)
- Website: https://swierklaniec.pl/

Gmina Świerklaniec is a rural gmina (administrative district) in Tarnowskie Góry County, Silesian Voivodeship, in southern Poland. Its seat is the village of Świerklaniec, which lies approximately 7 kilometres (4 mi) east of Tarnowskie Góry and 21 km (13 mi) north of the regional capital Katowice.

The gmina covers an area of 44.26 square kilometres (17.1 sq mi), and as of 2019 its total population is 12,328.

== Villages ==
Gmina Świerklaniec contains the villages and settlements of Nakło, Nowe Chechło, Orzech and Świerklaniec.

== Neighbouring gminas ==
Gmina Świerklaniec is bordered by the towns of Miasteczko Śląskie, Piekary Śląskie, Radzionków and Tarnowskie Góry, and by the gminas of Bobrowniki and Ożarowice.
