= Nakło Śląskie =

- Village
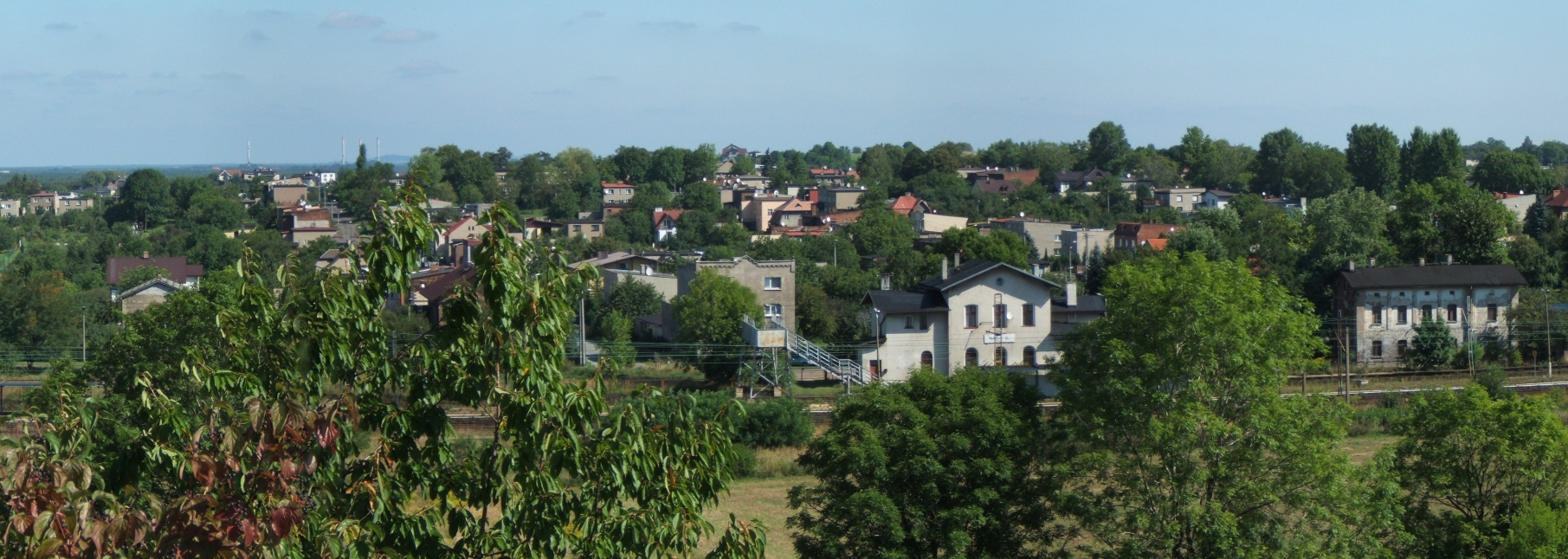

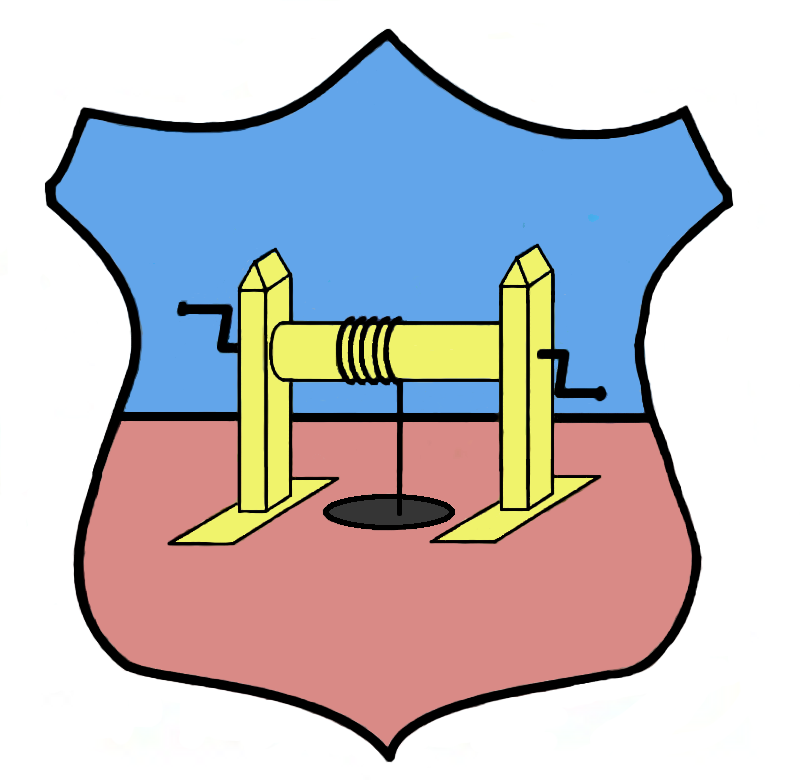
- Coat of arms

- Location within Poland
- Coordinates: 50°26′9″N 18°54′20″E
- Country: Poland
- Voivodeship: Silesian
- County: Tarnowskie Góry
- Gmina: Świerklaniec
- Elevation: 285 m (935 ft)
- Population: 4,100
  - Density: 300.8/km^{2} (779/sq mi)
- Postal code: 42-620
- Area code: +48 32
- Car plates: STA
- Website: http://www.naklosl.yoyo.pl/

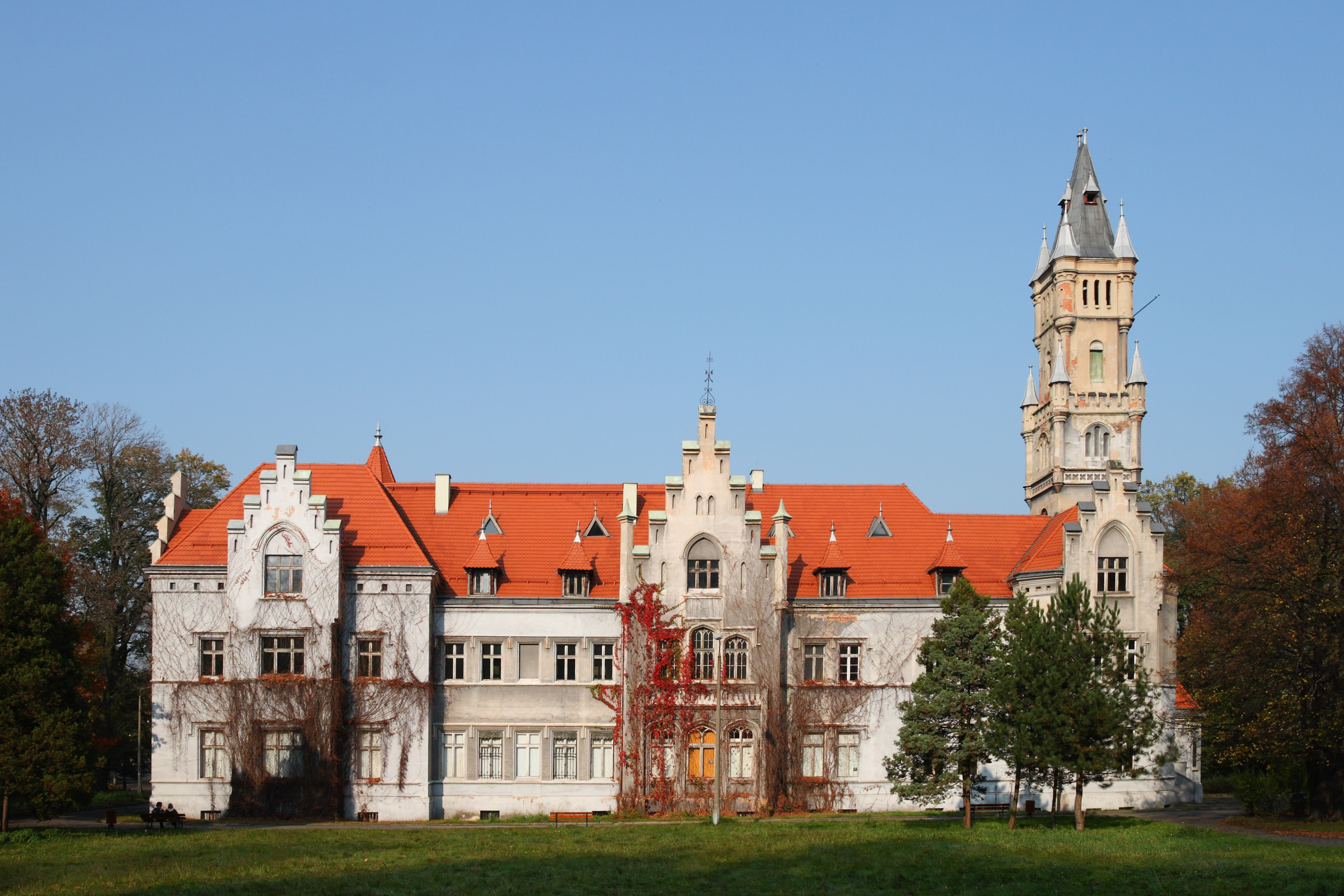
Donnersmarcks' Palace

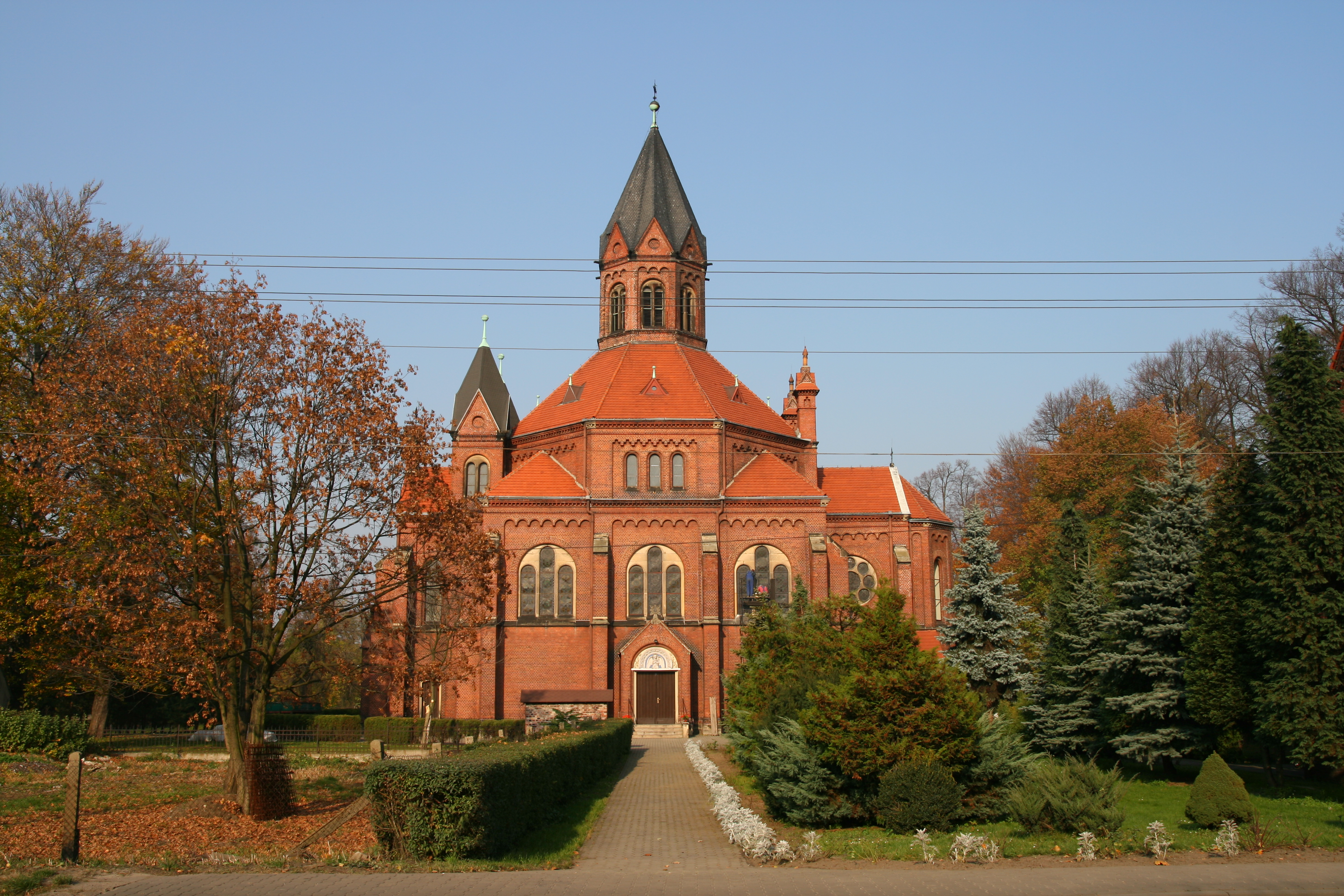
The Church

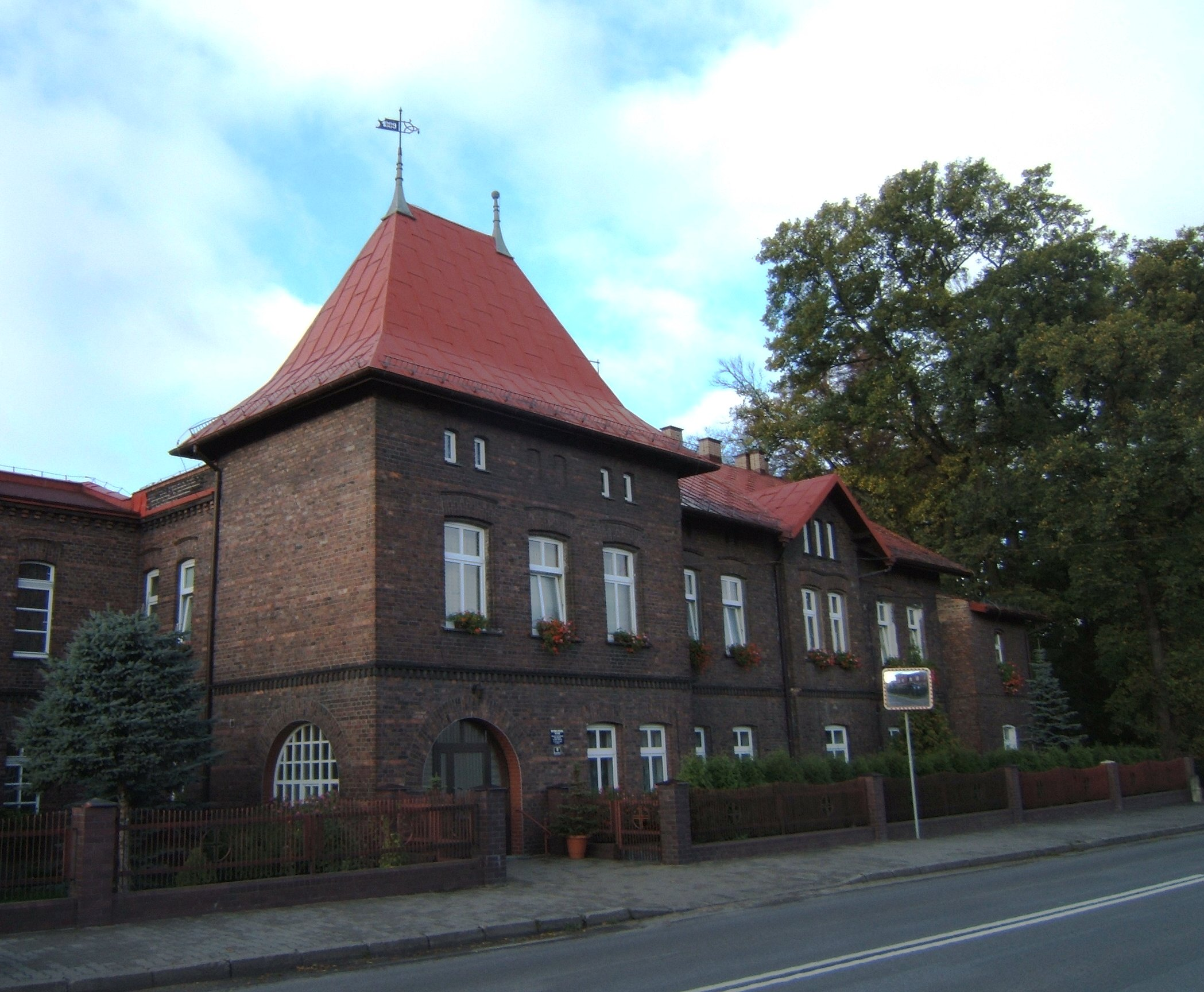
Orphanage

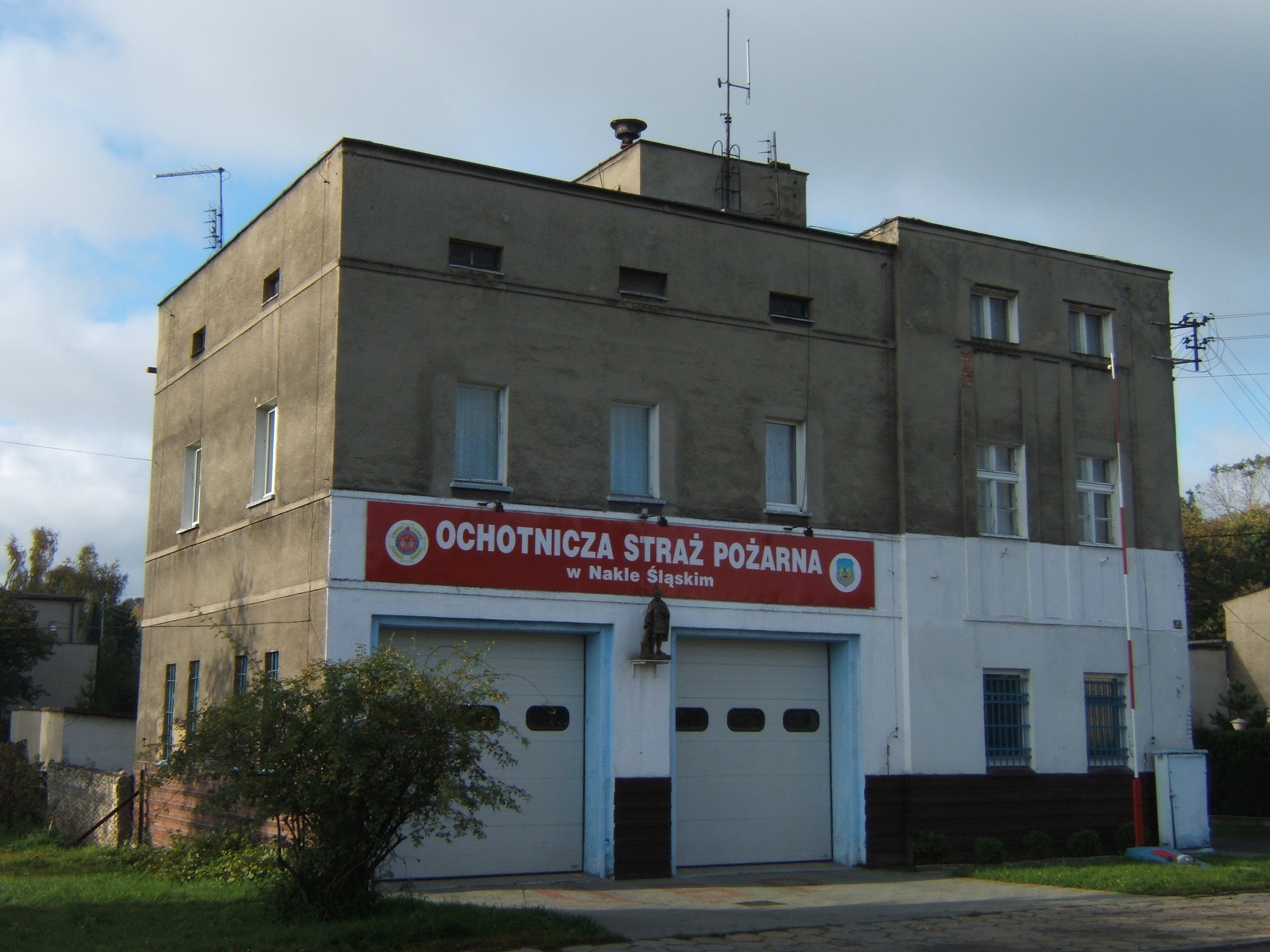
Fire station

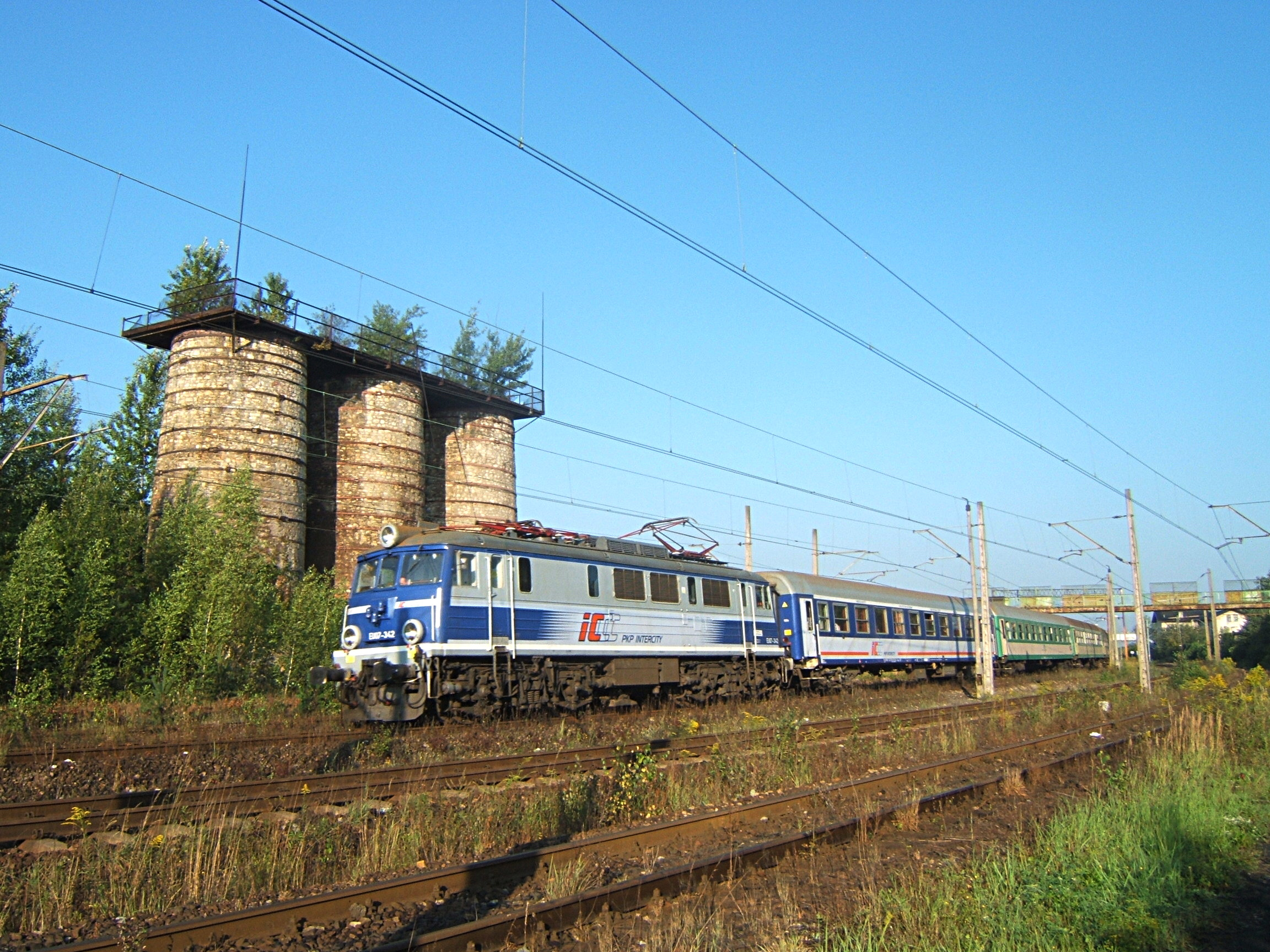
Lime kiln

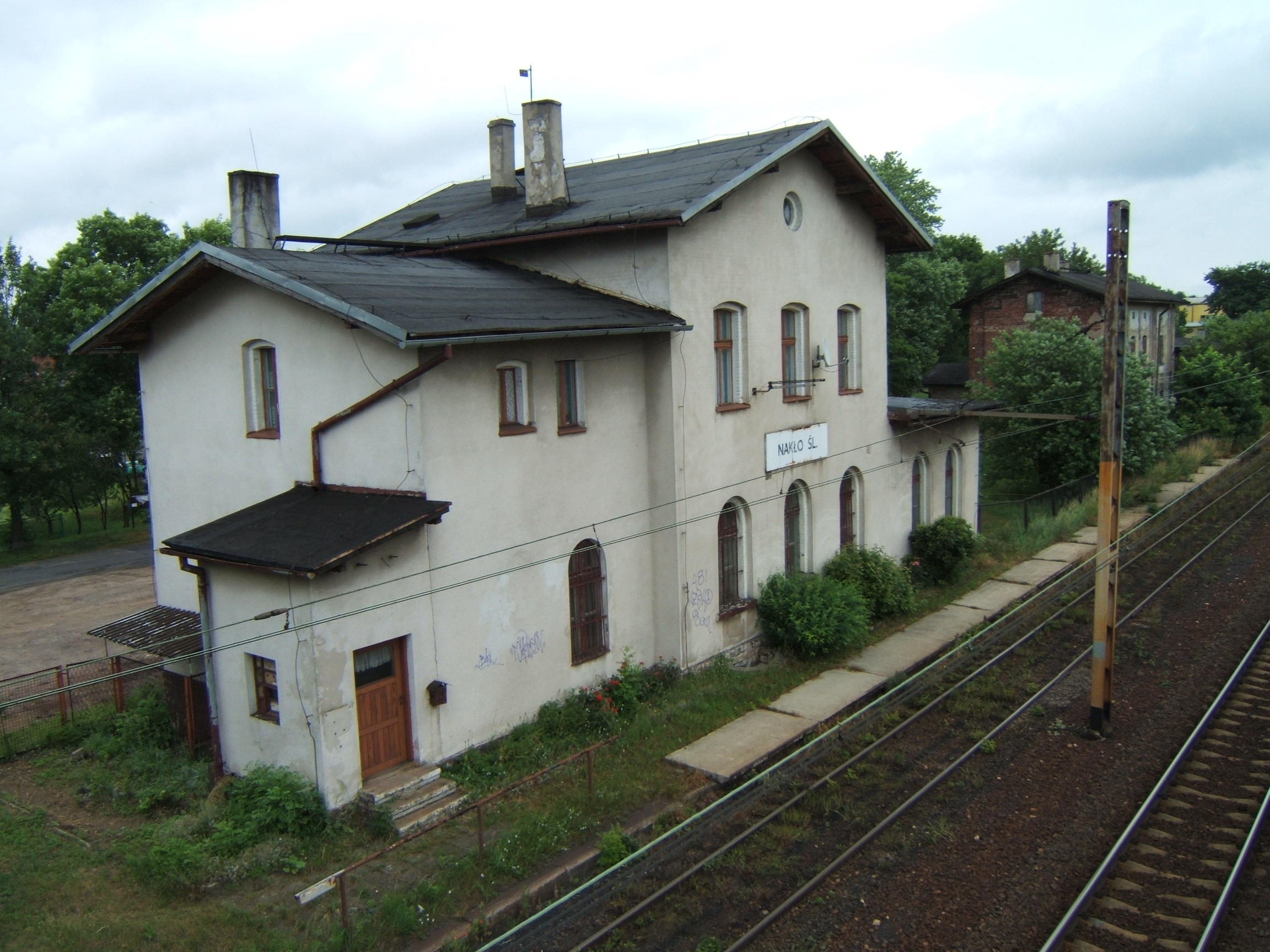
Train station

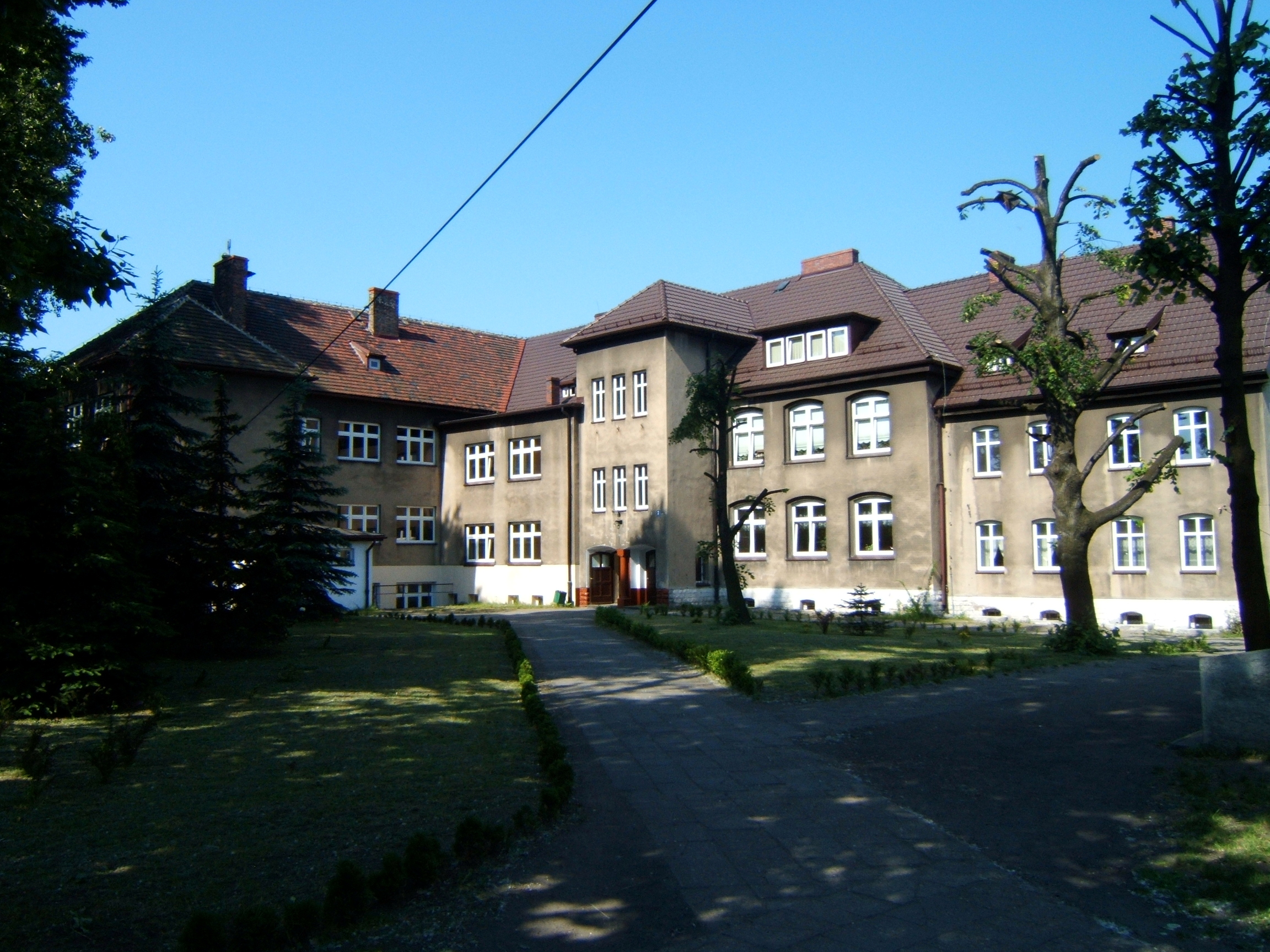
Primary School

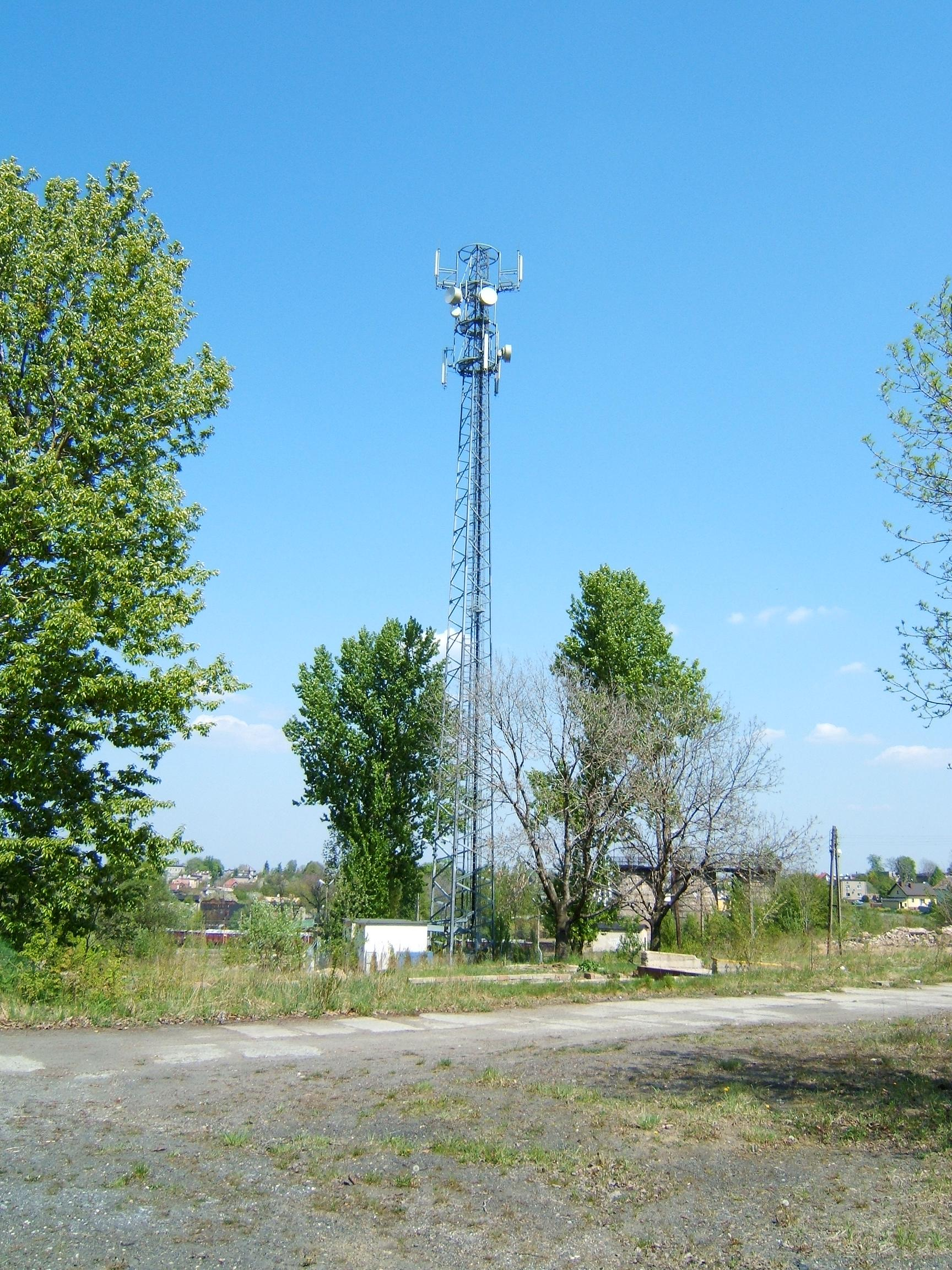
Base transceiver station

Nakło Śląskie [ˈnakwɔ] is a village in the administrative district of Gmina Świerklaniec, within Tarnowskie Góry County, Silesian Voivodeship, in southern Poland.
