= 1999–2000 Ekstraklasa =

73rd season of top-tier football league in Poland

Liga
- Season: 1999–2000
- Champions: Polonia Warsaw (2nd title)
- Relegated: ŁKS Łódź; Lech Poznań
- Matches: 239
- Goals: 671 (2.81 per match)
- Top goalscorer: Adam Kompała (19 goals)
- Average attendance: 4,622 ▲11.2%

Statistics of Ekstraklasa for the 1999–2000 season.

== Overview ==
A total of 16 teams competed in the 1999–2000 season. Polonia Warsaw won the championship.

== League table ==
Pos	Team	Pld	W	D	L	GF	GA	GD	Pts	Qualification or relegation
1	Polonia Warsaw (C)	30	20	5	5	56	26	+30	65	Qualification to Champions League second qualifying round
2	Wisła Kraków	30	16	8	6	64	38	+26	56	Qualification to UEFA Cup qualifying round
3	Ruch Chorzów	30	15	10	5	53	32	+21	55	Qualification to UEFA Cup qualifying round
4	Legia Warsaw	30	14	10	6	53	34	+19	52	
5	Zagłębie Lubin	30	12	9	9	42	37	+5	45	Qualification to Intertoto Cup first round
6	Amica Wronki	30	11	11	8	43	37	+6	44	Qualification to UEFA Cup qualifying round
7	Widzew Łódź	30	11	7	12	48	54	−6	40	
8	Stomil Olsztyn	30	8	13	9	33	43	−10	37	
9	Odra Wodzisław	30	10	7	13	34	38	−4	37	
10	Ruch Radzionków	30	11	4	15	38	49	−11	37	
11	Groclin Grodzisk	30	11	3	16	29	46	−17	36	
12	Petrochemia Płock	30	9	7	14	35	48	−13	34	
13	Pogoń Szczecin	30	8	10	12	41	53	−12	34	
14	Górnik Zabrze	30	8	8	14	42	41	+1	32	
15	ŁKS Łódź (R)	30	7	7	16	29	42	−13	28	Relegated to II liga
16	Lech Poznań (R)	30	6	7	17	34	57	−23	25	Relegated to II liga

Source: 90minut.pl (in Polish)
(C) Champions; (R) Relegated

== Results ==
Home \ Away	AMC	GÓR	DSK	LPO	LEG	ŁKS	ODR	PPŁ	POG	PWA	RUC	RAD	STO	WID	WIS	ZLU
Amica Wronki		3–2	0–1	1–0	1–2	2–1	1–0	2–1	2–2	5–0	1–4	1–1	1–1	2–0	0–0	1–1
Górnik Zabrze	1–3		1–2	4–0	2–2	3–1	0–2	4–1	2–2	0–1	1–2	5–0	1–0	0–1	1–0	0–0
Dyskobolia	1–1	0–2		1–2	1–0	2–1	0–1	3–1	1–2	0–1	0–3	2–1	3–2	1–0	1–2	1–0
Lech Poznań	2–1	1–1	0–0		1–2	1–1	0–1	1–0	1–1	1–3	1–2	3–1	1–2	3–5	4–1	2–0
Legia Warsaw	2–0	0–0	5–0	1–1		0–0	1–1	1–0	5–1	0–3	3–1	4–2	4–0	2–1	0–2	2–2
ŁKS Łódź	3–0	2–2	1–0	1–0	1–1		1–0	1–2	4–3	0–2	2–2	1–0	1–1	2–3	0–2	4–2
Odra Wodzisław	0–2	3–3	0–2	4–0	0–2	2–0		1–2	1–0	3–1	2–2	0–0	3–1	2–0	0–3	1–1
Petrochemia Płock	0–0	1–0	1–1	2–1	3–1	2–0	0–1		3–1	2–1	0–0	1–3	1–1	0–0	1–1	2–1
Pogoń Szczecin	0–3	0–1	1–0	4–3	2–4	0–0	0–0	2–1		0–2	1–1	4–0	3–0	2–3	3–3	1–0
Polonia Warsaw	4–0	1–0	1–0	5–0	1–1	1–0	4–1	3–0 (Note: The match between Polonia and Petrochemia (originally finished 2–0) verified to wo. Too many (4) foreign players in Petrochemia team (Ozuah Ikemefuna-Sudy, Mike Mouzie, Justin Evans, Vahan Gevorgyan).)	4–0		0–2	4–1	2–0	1–0	2–1	1–1
Ruch Chorzów	1–1	2–1	4–1	2–0	0–1	3–0	3–1	3–1	2–2	2–2		2–1	3–0	4–1	1–1	0–2
Ruch Radzionków	0–3	1–0	2–0	4–1	1–1	1–0	2–1	2–1	1–0	0–2	1–2		0–1	4–1	4–1	1–0
Stomil Olsztyn	1–1	1–0	5–2	1–1	1–0	1–0	2–1	2–2	1–1	0–0	0–0	1–0		2–2	1–1	1–1
Widzew Łódź	3–2	1–1	2–3	2–2	3–2	2–0	1–1	4–3	1–2	1–1	1–0	2–1	2–2		3–4	2–1
Wisła Kraków	1–1	6–3	3–0	2–0	1–1	1–0	3–1	3–1	1–1	2–3	4–0	2–0	4–2	3–1		4–0
Zagłębie Lubin	2–2	2–1	1–0	2–1	2–3	1–0	1–0	5–0	3–1	2–1	0–0	3–3	2–0	1–0	3–2	

Source: 90minut.pl (in Polish)
Legend: Blue = home team win; Yellow = draw; Red = away team win.

== Top goalscorers ==
Rank	Player	Club	Goals
1	(Poland) Adam Kompała	Górnik Zabrze	19
2	(Poland) Tomasz Frankowski	Wisła Kraków	17
3	(Poland) Sylwester Czereszewski	Legia Warsaw	16
4	(Poland) Krzysztof Bizacki	Ruch Chorzów	14
5	(Poland) Mariusz Nosal	Petrochemia Płock	13
6	(Poland) Emmanuel Olisadebe	Polonia Warsaw	12
6	(Poland) Maciej Żurawski	Lech Poznań / Wisła Kraków	12
8	(Poland) Paweł Kryszałowicz	Amica Wronki	11
8	(Poland) Piotr Włodarczyk	Ruch Chorzów	11
10	(Poland) Piotr Gierczak	Górnik Zabrze	10
10	(Poland) Rafał Pawlak	Widzew Łódź	10
10	(Poland) Łukasz Sosin	Odra Wodzisław	10

== Attendances ==
Club	Average
Pogoń Szczecin	9,687
Legia Warszawa	7,367
Lech Poznań	7,160
Stomil Olsztyn	5,900
Wisła Kraków	5,600
Wisła Płock	5,333
ŁKS	4,698
Ruch Chorzów	4,326
Ruch Radzionków	3,733
Górnik Zabrze	3,531
Odra Wodzisław Śląski	3,234
Widzew Łódź	3,110
Zagłębie Lubin	2,853
Polonia Warszawa	2,830
Amica Wronki	2,300
Dyskobolia	2,287
