= Orzech, Silesian Voivodeship =

Orzech
- Village
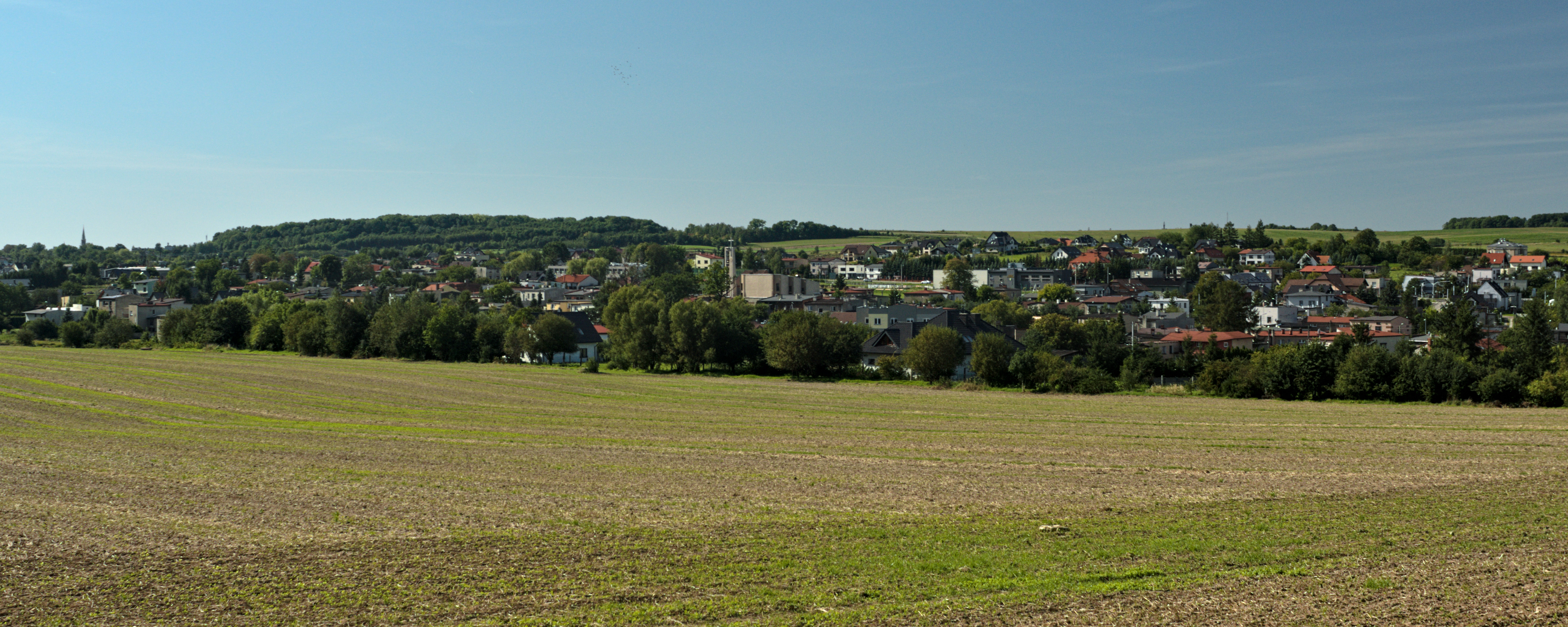
- Orzech in 2019

- Location within Poland
- Coordinates: 50°26′N 18°56′E
- Country: Poland
- Voivodeship: Silesian
- County: Tarnowskie Góry
- Gmina: Świerklaniec
- Population: 1,840

Orzech [ˈɔʐɛx] is a village in the administrative district of Gmina Świerklaniec, within Tarnowskie Góry County, Silesian Voivodeship, in southern Poland.
