= Piotr Gierczak =

Polish footballer

Personal information
- Full name: Piotr Gierczak
- Date of birth: 2 May 1976 (age 50)
- Place of birth: Ostrowiec Świętokrzyski, Poland
- Height: 1.76 m (5 ft 9 in)
- Position: Forward

Team information
- Current team: Górnik Zabrze (assistant)

Youth career
- 1989–1990: KSZO Ostrowiec
- 1990–1994: Gwarek Zabrze

Senior career*
Years	Team	Apps	(Gls)
1994–1997	Polonia Bytom		
1997–2003	Górnik Zabrze	163	(39)
2004	Szczakowianka Jaworzno	27	(5)
2005	GKS Bełchatów	11	(0)
2005	Podbeskidzie Bielsko-Biała	16	(1)
2006	Diagoras	16	(4)
2007–2008	Górnik Zabrze	30	(2)
2008–2009	Odra Wodzisław Śląski	21	(1)
2009–2010	Ruch Radzionków	31	(10)
2010–2012	Górnik Zabrze	11	(1)
2012	GKS Katowice	9	(0)
2012	Jastrząb Bielszowice	8	(1)
2012–2016	Wilki Wilcza	84	(31)
Total		513	(125)

Managerial career
- 2017: Wilki Wilcza
- 2018–2019: Górnik Zabrze II
- 2021–2022: Górnik Zabrze II
- 2025: Górnik Zabrze
- * Club domestic league appearances and goals

Piotr Gierczak (born 2 May 1976) is a Polish professional football manager and former player who is currently the assistant manager of Ekstraklasa club Górnik Zabrze.

== Career ==
He started out playing for KSZO Ostrowiec Świętokrzyski.

== Managerial statistics ==
As of match played 24 May 2025

Managerial record by team and tenure
Team	From	To	Record							
Team	From	To	G	W	D	L	GF	GA	GD	Win %
Wilki Wilcza	16 July 2017	October 2017	10	5	1	4	18	16	+2	50.00
Górnik Zabrze II	3 August 2018	13 June 2019	42	19	12	11	76	60	+16	45.24
Górnik Zabrze II	1 July 2021	30 June 2022	39	19	7	13	82	49	+33	48.72
Górnik Zabrze	15 April 2025	30 June 2025	6	1	4	1	4	4	+0	16.67
Total			97	44	24	29	180	129	+51	45.36

== Honours ==
=== Player ===
Ruch Radzionków

- II liga West: 2009–10

=== Manager ===
Górnik Zabrze II

- Polish Cup (Zabrze regionals): 2018–19
