= Ruch Radzionków =

Silesian football club

Coordinates: 50°23′33.66″N 18°52′42.13″E

- Full name: Klub Sportowy; Ruch Radzionków
- Nickname: Cidry
- Founded: 14 August 1919; 106 years ago (as Towarzystwo Gier i Zabaw Radzionków); 2012; 13 years ago (refounded)
- Ground: SMS Radzionków
- Capacity: 532
- Chairman: Witold Wieczorek
- Manager: Marcin Trzcionka
- League: IV liga Silesia
- 2024–25: 4th of 19
- Website: ruchradzionkow.com
Home colours	Away colours

Ruch Radzionków is a Polish association football club based in Radzionków. As of the 2024–25 season, the club finished 4th in the IV liga Silesia.

== History ==
=== Foundation ===
The club was established by a group of Polish activists who modelled the organisation on contemporary German sports associations. Founded as Towarzystwo Gier i Zabaw (transl. Games and Entertainment Society) on the 14th August 1919, the First Silesian Uprising broke out just a few days later in which members of the newly created club became involved. The following year the club changed its name to Ruch Radzionków, although the prefix ruch (lit. movement) was not as unambiguously Polish as Piast, Radzin, and Jastrząb which were also contenders for the club’s name.

During the first few decades of its existence Ruch Radzionków contested a series of international matches, of which little is known, and were able to build a stadium which was completed in 1933. In 1935 a Sanation-backed contender to the club was established named Strzelec Radzionków. The state-initiated club was intended to absorb Ruch Radzionków, with the latter being evicted from their newly built ground. However, Strzelec Radzionków failed to gain public support and Ruch Radzionków were able to return to their ground.

=== 1950s rise out of lower leagues ===
In the early to mid-1950s, the club first met Piast Gliwice in the regional league. In 1956 Ruch were listed in the Trzecia liga (transl. third league) group named Stalinogrodzka liga wojewódzka (id est the Stalinogród regional league) playing under the name ZKS Górnik Radzionków between 1953-55. The 1950s saw the club gain promotion out of the regional leagues into the national II liga for the first time.

=== Top flight ===
The 1990s were an era of success for Ruch Radzionków in which they reached the quarter finals of the Polish Cup and had been promoted to the I liga by the end of the decade. During their first season in the top flight the club won a surprising string of victories including a 5-0 defeat over Widzew Łódź in their first match, a 4-0 victory over title holders ŁKS Łódź, an historic draw with Wisła Kraków, and a 4-1 defeat over Lech Poznań thereby finishing their opponents hopes of winning the league. The club remained in the top tier for a further 3 seasons.

=== 21st century ===
In 2012 Ruch Radzionków was disaffiliated due to financial problems, and the club board decided to withdraw from the I liga following the 2011–12 season.

The club were champions of the Silesia I group of IV liga in the 2017–18 season and won the play-offs against Polonia Bytom, giving them promotion to the III liga.

== Stadiums ==
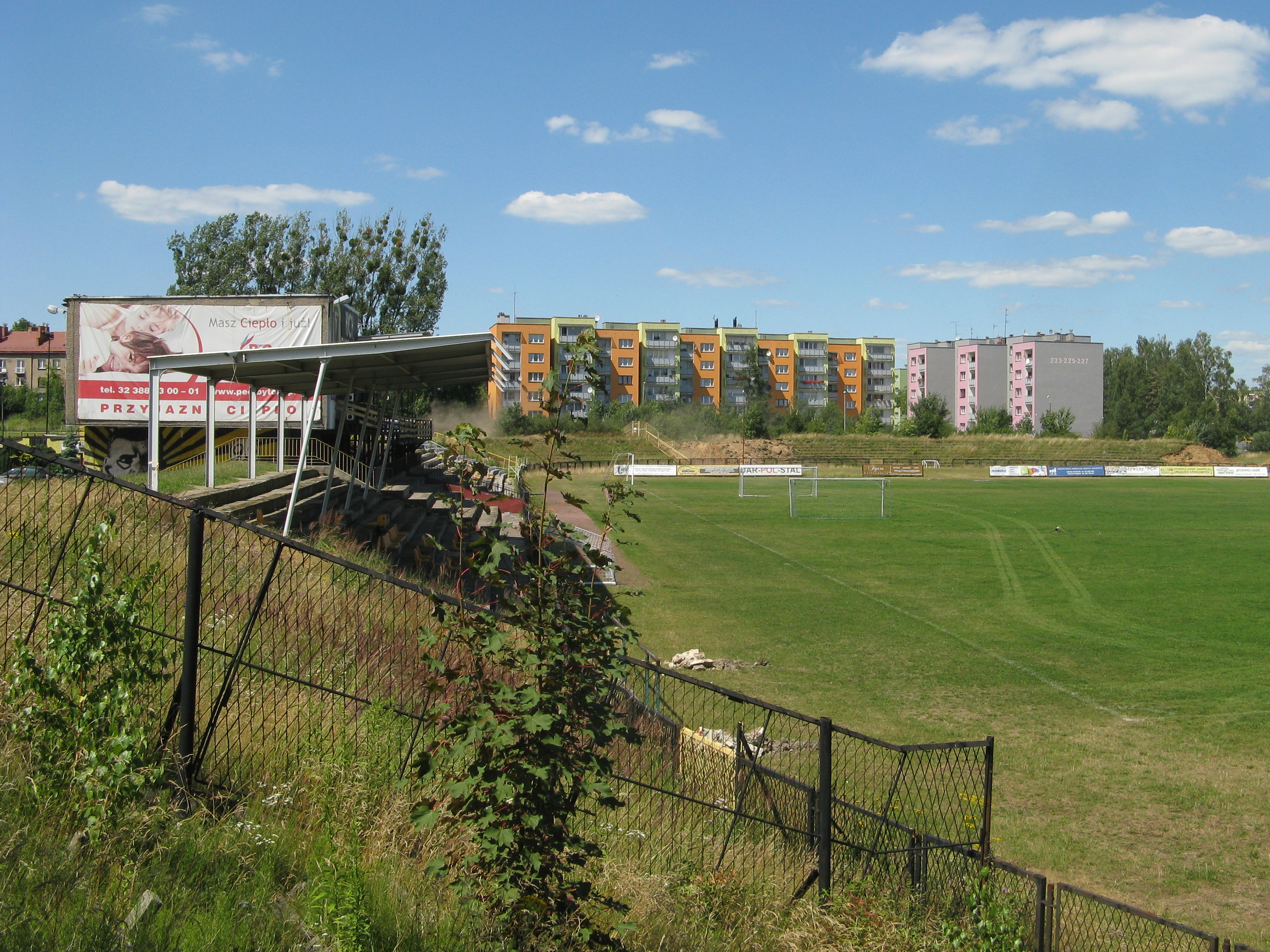
Ruch Radzionków Stadium, home of the club until 2018

Ruch Radzionków moved into their first purpose built stadium in 1933. The construction of the ground was patronised by the voivode of the Silesian Voivodeship Michał Grażyński, for whom the ground was subsequently named. Michał Grażyński Stadium was considered state-of-the-art at the time, being the second biggest in Poland after Ruch Chorzów Stadium.

== Club identity ==
Ruch Radzionków have a strong Silesian identity in contrast to nearby rivals Polonia Bytom who are associated with a Polish one due to their historic links with the club Pogoń Lwów. During their first spell in the top tier, Ruch Radzionków‘s ground was located in the Stroszek district of Bytom, an added symbolism to their success.

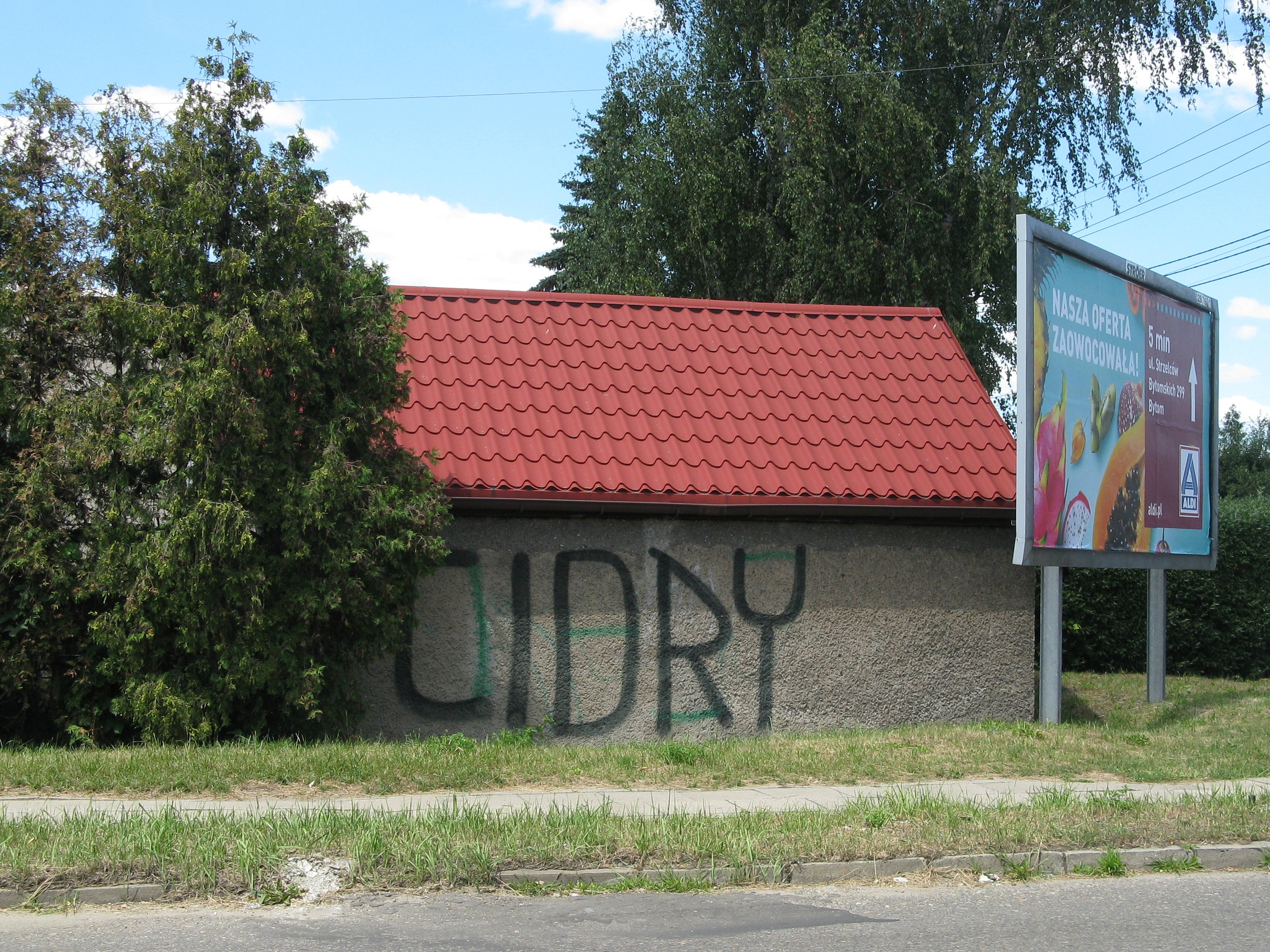
Cidry fans’ graffiti in the Rojca area of Radzionków

Due to the history of cider production and consumption in Radzionków, inhabitants of the town are known as cidry. Fans of Ruch Radzionków have adopted the moniker as their club’s nickname. Since 2009 the fanzine Ciderland has been produced, which is distributed within the town and wider areas such as Bytom, Tarnowskie Góry, Orzech and Świerklaniec, from where the club draw their support. The club’s anthem Ciderland is sung by fans during matches;

Polish

Załóż szal Ruchu radzionkowskiego
Nasz dzisiejszy plan – iść by wygrać mecz
Ludzie z innych miast znają “Cidry” z tego
Że wiernych kibiców ma i zawsze będzie mieć

Ciderland, Ciderland na tle żółto czarnych barw
Ciderland, Ruch Radzionków GKS
Ciderland, Ciderland na tle żółto czarnych barw
Ciderland, radzionkowski GKS

—First two verses of Ciderland
Translation:
English

Put on a Ruch Radzionków scarf
Our plan today – go to win the match
People from other cities know Cidry because
It has and will always have loyal fans

Ciderland, Ciderland against the background of yellow and black colors
Ciderland, Ruch Radzionków GKS
Ciderland, Ciderland against the background of yellow and black colors
Ciderland, Radzionkowski GKS

== See also ==
- Bristol City F.C. - an English football club with a similar identity, nicknamed the Cider Army.
